= CMLL Super Viernes (June 2012) =

In June 2012 the Mexican professional wrestling promotion Consejo Mundial de Lucha Libre (CMLL) held four CMLL Super Viernes shows, all of which took place in Arena México on Friday nights. On Friday June 29, CMLL held their annual Infierno el en Ring super show, replacing the regular Super Viernes show. Some of the matches from Super Viernes were taped for CMLL's weekly shows that aired in Mexico the week following the Super Viernes show. The shows featured various professional wrestling matches with different wrestlers involved in pre-existing scripted feuds or storylines. Wrestlers portray either heels (referred to as "rudos" in Mexico, the "bad guys") or faces ("technicos" in Mexico, the "good guys") as they follow a series of tension-building events, which culminate in a wrestling match or series of matches. Being a professional wrestling event matches are not won legitimately; they are instead won via predetermined outcomes to the matches that is kept secret from the general public.

== June 1, 2012 ==
CMLL Super Viernes
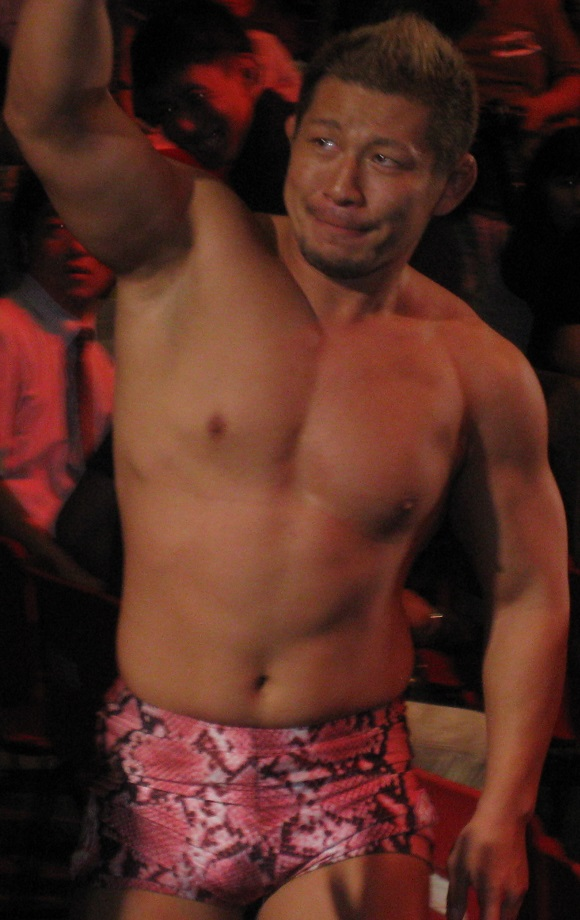
- Yujiro, New Japan Pro-Wrestling representative in the main event
- Promotion: Consejo Mundial de Lucha Libre (CMLL)
- Date: June 1, 2012
- City: Mexico City, Mexico
- Venue: Arena México

CMLL Super Viernes chronology
← Previous; Super Viernes May 25, 2012	Next → Super Viernes June 8, 2012

The June 1, 2012 Super Viernes was a professional wrestling event held by Consejo Mundial de Lucha Libre (CMLL) in their home arena Arena Mexico. The main event of the show was a Best two out of three falls Six-man tag team match between the teams of Atlantis, La Mascara, Shocker and Mephisto, Volador Jr., Yujiro. The semi-final match was a special Lucha de Apuesta, or "Bet match" where both Black Warrior and Rey Escorpión put their hair on the line against the outcome of the match. The show also featured two second-round matches of CMLL's En Busca de un Ídolo (Spanish for "In Search of an Idol") tournament and three additional matches.

=== Event ===
The opening match of the June 1st Super Viernes featured CMLL's female division as La Amapola, La Seductora and Tiffany teamed up to face the trio of Dark Angel, Estrellita and Marcela in a Best two out of three falls Six-woman tag team match. La Amapola's team won the match in two straight falls when Estrellita cheated and used the ropes for leverage to pin Marcela in the second fall. Following the match Estrellita made a surprising and confusing challenge for Amapola and Tiffany to face Estrellita and Marcela, asking to team with her rival. The challenge was rejected by Marcela.

In the second match the more experienced Valiente captained a team consisting of himself, Rey Cometa and Stuka, Jr., the last one was one half of the CMLL Arena Coliseo Tag Team Championship team with Fuego. tecnico (wrestlers who portray the "Good guys", also called "Face") team faced La Fiebre Amarilla ("The Yellow Fever": Namajague and Okumura) and Puma King. Puma King proudly displayed the mask of professional wrestler Arissma that he had won only days before. Rey Cometa and Puma King had been involved in a slowly escalating storyline leading up to the match. In the third and final fall Puma King tried to add another mask to his collection as he unmasked Rey Cometa, only to cause his team to be disqualified.

=== En Busca de un Ídolo tournament ===
CMLL held a monthlong En Busca de un Ídolo ("In search of an Idol") tournament with the purpose of identifying which of the "Rookies" in the tournament would move up the ranks of the promotion. The first round had concluded and four wrestlers had advanced to the second round. Diamante faced off against Dragon Lee in a match where both the outcome and their performance influenced the number of points each participant would get. During the match Diamante landed wrong after trying to execute a springboard 450 degree splash during the match, while Dragon Lee managed to recover from a Shooting Star Press but landing on his feet instead of on his opponent. After missing the move Diamante forced Dragon Lee to submit for the victory. After the match Diamante was given 28 points by the three judges and Dragon Lee was given 26 points out of 40 possible based on their in-ring performance. In the second En Busca de un Ídolo tournament match of the night point leader Titán faced off against Euforia, who had CMLL trainer Tony Salazar in his corner. During the match Salazar got up on the apron, only for Euforia to push him away. Moments later Euforia locked a submission hold on Titán and almost succeeded in making him submit, but in the last moment Salazar threw a towel in the ring, indicating that he conceded the match on behalf of Euforia. Following the match Titán was awarded 36 points for his performance while Euforia only got 22 points.

The fifth match of the night had La Fuerza TRT, El Terrible, Rey Bucanero and Tiger go up against the tecnico trio of Diamante Azul, La Sombra and Máximo. The teamwork of La Fuerza TRT allowed the rudo trio to take the victory, winning both the second and third fall after double teaming their opponents.

=== Luchas de Apuestas ===
The sixth match of the evening was a special attraction Lucha de Apuesta, or bet match where both Rey Escorpión and Black Warrior "bet" their hair on the outcome of the match as the loser would be shaved bald afterwards. Escorpión was accompanied to the ring by his Los Guerreros del Infierno team mate Dragón Rojo, Jr. while Black Warrior had La Sombra as his corner man for the big match. Escorpión won the first fall only minutes into the ring, only for Black Warrior to even the score only minutes later. The third fall lasted longer than the first two combined and saw Rey Escorpión win the match after using a package piledriver against Black Warrior. Escorpión attacked Black Warrior after he had had all his hair shaved off, beating him up to such an extent that Black Warrior had to be carried out of the arena on a stretcher.

=== Main event ===
New Japan Pro-Wrestling (NJPW) wrestler Yujiro had spent time in CMLL early in his career and made brief returns in the years following the extended CMLL tour. For the night Yujiro teamed up with Mephisto and Volador Jr. to fight the team of Atlantis, La Mascara and Shocker. Yujiro used underhanded tactics to secure the first fall for his team, but their opponents overwhelmed them in both falls two and three to win the match.

=== Results ===
No.	Results	Stipulations
1	La Amapola, La Seductora and Tiffany defeated Dark Angel, Estrellita and Marcela	Best two out of three falls Tag team match
2	Rey Cometa, Stuka, Jr. and Valiente defeated La Fiebre Amarilla (Namajague and Okumura) and Puma King	Six-man tag team match
3	Diamante defeated Dragon Lee	En Busca de un Ídolo Tournament Second Round Match
4	Titán defeated Euforia	En Busca de un Ídolo Tournament Second Round Match
5	La Fuerza TRT (El Terrible, Rey Bucanero and Tiger) defeated Diamante Azul, La Sombra and Máximo	Six-man tag team match
6	Rey Escorpión defeated Black Warrior	Best two-out-of-three falls Lucha de Apuesta hair vs. hair match
7	Atlantis, La Mascara and Shocker defeated Mephisto, Volador Jr. and Yujiro	Six-man tag team match

== June 8, 2012 ==
CMLL Super Viernes
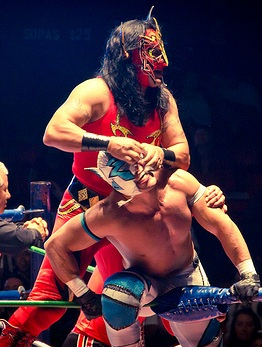
- Psicosis (in the back) and Delta, on opposite sides in the semi-main event.
- Promotion: Consejo Mundial de Lucha Libre (CMLL)
- Date: June 8, 2012
- City: Mexico City, Mexico
- Venue: Arena México

CMLL Super Viernes chronology
← Previous; Super Viernes June 1, 2012	Next → Super Viernes June 15, 2012

The June 8, 2012 Super Viernes was a professional wrestling event held by Consejo Mundial de Lucha Libre (CMLL) in their home arena Arena Mexico. The main event was Los Guerreros del Infierno, represented by Rey Escorpión and Último Guerrero, teaming up with New Japan Pro-Wrestling (NJPW) representative Yujiro to face the reigning CMLL World Trios Champions El Bufete del Amor (Marco Corleone, Máximo and Rush) in a non-title match. The show also featured two second round matches in the En Busca de un Ídolo Tournament, the second of three weeks of second round matches and saw Euforia wrestle Diamante and point leader Titán face |Dragon Lee. The show also featured CMLL's women's division competing in a Battle Royal and a torneo cibernetico, multi-person elimination match and three additional matches.

=== Event ===
The opening match was supposed to feature Robin team up with Leono for the match, but Leono ended up teaming with Bengala, the last minute substitution did not hinder the team as they defeated Apocalipsis and Cholo two falls to by winning the second and third falls. The second fall saw Mini-Estrellas Pequeño Violencia and Pierrothito wear the Puerto Rican inspired ring gear they used back when they were part of a group called Los Boricuas, paying homage to the group founder and Lucha Libre legend Pierroth, Jr. before the match. The two rudos (wrestlers who portray the "Bad guys") teamed up with Demus 3:16 and faced the team of Eléctrico, Pequeño Halcon and Último Dragóncito. The Boricua duo won the third fall, Pierrothito forcing Electrico to submit and Violencia pinning Pequeño Halcón while shouting "Viva Puerto Rica".

=== Torneo Cibernetico ===
CMLL often uses the concept of a "seeding Battle Royal" to determine the two sides facing off in a torneo cibernetico (a multi-person elimination match) and for the June 8, 2012 Super Viernes CMLL had the female competitors La Amapola, Dalys la Caribeña, Dark Angel, Estrellita, Lady Afrodita, Lady Apache, Luna Magica, Marcela, La Seductora and Tiffany face off in a battle royal where the first five competitors eliminated from the match would comprise one team and the five remaining wrestlers would be the opposing team. Dark Angel, Estrellita, La Seductora, Luna Magica and Marcela remained in the ring and became one side of the torneo cibernetico facing the team of Dalys la Caribeña, La Amapola, Lady Afrodita, Lady Apache and Tiffany. Lady Afrodita was the first person eliminated as Seductora pinned her, then Luna Magica was eliminated by Dalys la Caribeña. La Seductura was eliminated third, followed by Dalys and then Tiffany. Long time rivals La Amapola and Marcela went to a double elimination through a double pin leaving only Dark Angel and Lady Apache. The two women came to the ring wearing matching outfits and had been working together regularly up until this point. During the final moments of the match Lady Apache began to show more rudo tendencies, pulling Dark Angel's hair and finally drawing a disqualification by pushing the referee out of the way, leaving Dark Angel as the sole survivor and winner of the match.

=== En Busca de un Ídolo tournament ===
CMLL held a monthlong En Busca de un Ídolo ("In search of an Idol") tournament with the purpose of identifying which of the "Rookies" in the tournament would move up the ranks of the promotion. The first round had concluded and four wrestlers had advanced to the second round under round robin rules. Each of the Busca competitors were given a mentor and a trainer, with Atlantis and Franco Colombo helping the tecnico participants and Último Guerrero and Tony Salazar to help the sole rudo participant in the second round. Diamante was accompanied by both Atlantis and Franco Colombo while Euforia only had Último Guerrero in his corner following Salazar costing Euforia his tournament match the previous week. Euforia forced Diamante to submit after about six and a half minutes of in-ring action. Following the match Diamante was given 30 points for his performance by the three judges while Eurforia was given 36 out of 40 possible points by the judges in addition to the 20 points earned by his victory.

The second En Busca de un Ídolo match had tecnicos Dragon Lee and Titán, up until this point Dragon Lee had the most points from the judges but Titán had scored more points through CMLL's online polls, putting him at the top of the point board before the show. The one fall match was Dragon Lee defeat Titán by applying a leaping arm scissors into a submission hold. Following the match Dragon Lee was given 35 points by the judges, while Titán got 37 points, scoring higher despite losing the match.

The seventh match of the night was the first match that Black Warrior worked after having his hair shaved off the previous week following a Lucha de Apuesta ("Bet match") loss to Rey Escorpión. Warrior teamed up with Atlantis and Delta, two-thirds of Los Reyes de la Atlantida ("The Kings of the Atlantis") who together with Guerrero Maya, Jr. held the Mexican National Trios Championship at this point. The trio took on Los Invasores ("The Invaders"; Mr. Águila, Psicosis II and Volador Jr.) for the semi-final match of the show. During the match Atlantis and Delta made a couple of mistakes, accidentally hitting Black Warrior when their opponents ducked out of the way. After a few mistakes Black Warrior turned on his tag team partners, attacking them and helping Los Invasores to win the match, who then welcomed Black Warrior back to the rudo side with open arms. Following the match Black Warrior stole the masks of both Atlantis and Delta to the dismay of the crowd.

=== Main event ===
The reigning CMLL World Trios Champions El Bufete del Amor ("The Law of Love") Marco Corleone, Máximo and Rush faced the team of Los Guerreros del Infierno ("The Infernal Warriors"; Rey Escorpión and Último Guerrero) and Yujiro in a non-title match. The two teams traded the first two falls in the match. During the third fall Guerrero applied one of his finishing moves to Rush, leaving the tecnico vulnerable, but Rey Escorpión jumped in the ring while Guerrero had his back turned and pinned Rush instead. When Guerrero noticed what had happened he expressed his displeasure of being upstaged like that, but Rey Escorpión walked off before Guerrero had a chance to confront him about his actions.

=== Results ===
No.	Results	Stipulations
1	Bengala and Leono defeated Apocalipsis and Cholo	Best two out of three falls Tag team match
2	Demus 3:16, Pequeño Violencia and Pierrothito defeated Eléctrico, Pequeño Halcon and Último Dragóncito	Six-man tag team match
3	Dark Angel, Estrellita, La Seductora, Luna Magica and Marcela defeated Dalys la Caribeña, La Amapola, Lady Afrodita, Lady Apache and Tiffany	Battle Royal
4	Dark Angel defeated Dalys la Caribeña, Estrellita, La Amapola, Lady Afrodita, Lady Apache, La Seductora, Luna Magica, Marcela and Tiffany	Torneo cibernetico Match
5	Euforia defeated Diamante	En Busca de un Ídolo Tournament Second Round Match
6	Dragon Lee defeated Titán	En Busca de un Ídolo Tournament Second Round Match
7	Los Invasores (Mr. Águila, Psicosis II and Volador Jr.) defeated Atlantis, Black Warrior and Delta	Six-man tag team match
8	Los Guerreros del Infierno (Rey Escorpión and Último Guerrero) and Yujiro defeated El Bufete del Amor (Marco Corleone, Máximo and Rush)	Six-man tag team match

=== Torneo Cibernetico order of elimination ===
Order	Wrestler	Eliminated by
1	Lady Afrodita	La Seductora
2	Luna Magica	Dalys la Caribeña
3	La Seductora	Tiffany
4	Dalys la Caribeña	Estrellita
5	Estrellita	Marcela
6	Tiffany	Marcela
7	La Amapola	Marcela (Double Pin)
8	Marcela	La Amapola (Double Pin)
9	Lady Apache	Disqualified

== June 15, 2012 ==
CMLL Super Viernes
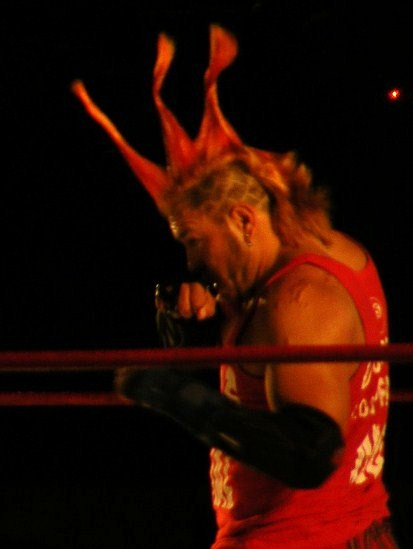
- Mr. Águila, part of Los Invasores
- Promotion: Consejo Mundial de Lucha Libre (CMLL)
- Date: June 15, 2012
- City: Mexico City, Mexico
- Venue: Arena México

CMLL Super Viernes chronology
← Previous; Super Viernes June 8, 2012	Next → Super Viernes June 22, 2012

The June 15, 2012 Super Viernes was a professional wrestling event held by Consejo Mundial de Lucha Libre (CMLL) in their home arena Arena Mexico. The main event of the show saw Atlantis and Rush teamed up with Diamante Azul, who had recently been given the "Diamante Azul" ring character to replace the more generic "Metro" name he worked under. The team faced Rey Escorpión, Último Guerrero and Yujiro, who during the previous week's show had shown signs of dissension between Rey Escorpión and Último Guerrero. The semi-main event was the first time Black Warrior worked as a rudo (Bad guy) after turning on his tag team partners the previous week. Black Warrior, Mr. Águila and Volador Jr. wrestled Ángel de Oro, Delta and Guerrero Maya, Jr. The show also featured the last two second round matches En Busca de un Ídolo Tournament and Lady Apache working as a Ruda for the first time in her career.

=== Event ===
Opening match rudos Bobby Zavala and Disturbio have teamed regularly in late 2011 and into 2012, having recently suffered a number of losses and came into the match against Molotov and Starman with something to prove. Zavala and Disturbio defeated Molotov and Starman two falls to one. In the second match Pegasso suffered a hard blow to the neck, but actually managed to finish the match without revealing just how much he was hurting, but he was taken to the hospital after the match to evaluate his condition. Pegasso teamed up with Ángel Azteca, Jr. and Fuego, facing and losing to Los Guerreros Tuareg (Arkangel de la Muerte, Hooligan and Skándalo) when Los Guerreros Tuareg won both the second and third falls of the match. The third fall saw Lady Apache work as a rudo, blending seamlessly with Dalys la Caribeña and La Amapola after her turn the previous week. Lady Apache targeted team captain Dark Angel during the match while her partners focused on Estrellita and Princesa Blanca. In the third fall Lady Apache pinned Dark Angel by using the ropes for an unfair advantage. Following the match Dark Angel challenged Lady Apache to put her hair on the line in a Lucha de Apuesta ("Bet Match"). Afterwards Princesa Blanca challenged Dalys la Caribeña to a similar match despite having no explicit storyline between the two. Both challenges were accepted, and it was later announced that all four women would be part of a 10 women Infierno en el Ring steel cage match as the main event of the 2012 Infierno en el Ring.

=== En Busca de un Ídolo tournament ===
CMLL held a month long En Busca de un Ídolo ("In search of an Idol") tournament with the purpose of identifying which of the "Rookies" in the tournament would move up the ranks of the promotion. The first round had concluded and four wrestlers had advanced to the second round under round robin rules which would end after that week's Super Viernes matches. In the first match Euforia was accompanied by trainer Último Guerrero while Dragon Lee had his trainer Atlantis in his corner and was also surprisingly accompanied by Fray Tormenta for the match. The end came when Dragon Lee refused to release a submission hold even after Euforia submitted, costing himself the match by disqualification, giving Euforia 20 points. Following the match Dragon Lee was given 36 points, a perfect 10 from three of the judges and 6 from the rudo judge. Euforia only received 32 points for his effort in the match. In the final second round match Diamante unveiled a new look, a complete redesign of both his wrestling mask and trunks, replacing the primarily black design with a more silver and black design very reminiscent of Lucha libre legends El Santo and El Hijo del Santo. Diamante came into the match with two losses and ranked last of the four competitors, facing the point leader Titán. Diamante won the match after just over five minutes, forcing Titán to submit. Following the match Diamante got 29 out of 40 possible points, while Titán was given 33 points for his efforts, including a "10" from judge El Tirantes who had never given a tecnico a perfect score.

The previous week Black Warrior had attacked tag team partners Atlantis and Delta during their match, siding with Los Invasores instead. This week he teamed up with two of Los Invasores Mr. Águila and Volador Jr. to face Delta. Guerrero Maya, Jr. and Ángel de Oro. The newly minted rudo Black Warrior won the first fall for his team, only for the tecnico team to win the second fall. In the third fall Los Invasores cheated their way to victory, followed by Black Warrior challenging Delta and Guerrero Maya, Jr. to defend the Mexican National Trios Championship against them the following week. Los Invasores did not wait for an answer, instead they jumped their opponents, beat them up and stole their masks.

=== Main event ===
In the main event Atlantis teamed up with Diamante Azul and Rush to take on the dysfunctional team of Rey Escorpión, Último Guerrero and Yujiro. The previous week Rey Escorpión and Último Guerrero had some friction during the final phases of the match, but seemingly put those differences aside for the match. The team jumped Atlantis, Diamante Azul and Rush as they came to the ring, before the opening bell even rang. The surprise attack gave the rudo team the first fall and the early advantage in the match. Diamante Azul's power and determination brought the teams even as he won the second fall and then helped his team to take the third and deciding fall of the match.

=== Results ===
No.	Results	Stipulations
1	Bobby Zavala and Disturbio defeated Molotov and Starman	Best two out of three falls Tag team match
2	Los Guerreros Tuareg (Arkangel de la Muerte, Hooligan and Skándalo) defeated Ángel Azteca, Jr., Fuego and Pegasso	Six-man tag team match
3	Dalys la Caribeña, La Amapola and Lady Apache defeated Dark Angel, Estrellita and Princesa Blanca	Six-woman tag team match
4	Euforia defeated Dragon Lee by disqualification	En Busca de un Ídolo Tournament Second Round Match
5	Diamante defeated Titán	En Busca de un Ídolo Tournament Second Round Match
6	Black Warrior, Mr. Águila and Volador Jr. defeated Ángel de Oro, Delta and Guerrero Maya, Jr.	Six-man tag team match
7	Atlantis, Diamante Azul and Rush defeated Rey Escorpión, Último Guerrero and Yujiro	Six-man tag team match

== June 22, 2012 ==
CMLL Super Viernes
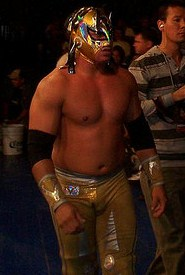
- Volador Jr. won the Mexican National Trios Championship
- Promotion: Consejo Mundial de Lucha Libre (CMLL)
- Date: June 22, 2012
- City: Mexico City, Mexico
- Venue: Arena México

CMLL Super Viernes chronology
← Previous; Super Viernes June 15, 2012	Next → Super Viernes July 6, 2012

The June 22, 2012 Super Viernes was a professional wrestling event held by Consejo Mundial de Lucha Libre (CMLL) in their home arena Arena Mexico. The main event saw Los Reyes de la Atlantida ("The Kings of the Atlantis"; Atlantis, Delta and Guerrero Maya, Jr.) defend the Mexican National Trios Championship against the newly formed Los Depredadores del Aire ("The Predators of the Air"; Black Warrior, Mr. Águila and Volador Jr.). The show also hosted the finals and award ceremony of the En Busca de un Ídolo tournament as finalists Titán and Euforia competed for the prize. The show featured four additional matches, including three Best two out of three falls Six-man tag team match and a tag team match.

=== Event ===
In the opening match veteran Tigre Blanco teamed up with the young Molotov to take on the team of Disturbio and Inquisidor. The combination of youth and experience overcame their opponents as Tigre Blanco and Molotov won two falls to one. The second match saw the continuation of a storyline feud between Rey Cometa and Puma King as they were on opposite sides of a Best two out of three falls six-man tag team match. Cometa teamed up with Starman and Stuka, Jr. while Puma King teamed with the veteran rudos (wrestlers who portray the "bad guy" characters, also called "heel") Sangre Azteca and Virus. In the third and deciding fall Puma King caused his team to be disqualified when he landed an illegal low blow on Rey Cometa, furthering the tension between the two that had already been building over the previous month or so. The third match saw Lady Apache continue her rudo ways, firmly establishing her as a rudo as she teamed up with La Seductora and Princesa Blanca to take on the team of Dark Angel, Estrellita and Goya Kong. In the first fall Goya Kong pulled La Seductora's mask off, drawing a disqualification for her team. While her actions in previous weeks could be explained as being emotional or making a mistake, her actions in the second fall clearly demonstrated Lady Apache's switch to the opposite side as she threw a handful of white powder in Dark Angel's face while the referee was distracted. Apache quickly pinned the temporarily blinded Dark Angel. Following the match all competitors talked about the upcoming Infierno en el Ring steel cage match that would take place the following week. Over the previous weeks the group known as Los Guerreros del Infierno had been showing signs of dissension, especially between group leader Último Guerrero and Rey Escorpión. Tonight the two teamed up with Dragón Rojo, Jr. to take on the team of Diamante Azul, La Mascara and La Sombra. Rey Escorpión forced La Sombra to submit in the first fall, with Los Guerreros taking the second fall for their side. During the third and final fall Guerrero locked in a submission hold on La Mascara, seemingly with victory in hand. Then Rey Escorpión entered the ring and applied a second submission hold on La Mascara, which caused the referee to disqualify the team for excessive violence, costing them the match just as it looked like Los Guerrero del Infierno were about to win. Following the loss Último Guerrero expressed his dissatisfaction with his team mate.

=== En Busca de un Ídolo finals ===
CMLL's En Busca de un Ídolo ("In search of an Idol") tournament came to an end after more than two months of matches and it came down to Titán and Euforia. Unlike the preliminary rounds the finals were decided by pinfall only, no judges points and no points from the online polls. Titán had mentor Atlantis and trainer Franco Colombo in his corner while Euforia was accompanied by trainer Tony Salazar and mentor Último Guerrero for the match. Euforia tried to gain an early advantage, attacking Titán before the bell even rung. During the match both wrestlers tore at each other's masks, with Titán's being ripped open and Euforia's mask being ripped in half, with the top half being completely torn off by the end of the match. Titán took the pinfall, winning the En Busca de un Ídolo. Following the match the top four competitors (Titán, Euforia, Diamante and Dragon Lee) were all given trophies and flowers as part of the celebrations.

=== Main Event ===
The start of the storyline that led to the June 22nd main event began two weeks earlier when Black Warrior turned on his tag team partners Atlantis and Delta during a match, joining up with a group known as Los Invasores, a week later Black Warrior, Mr. Águila and Volador Jr., now called Los Depredadores del Air ("The Predators of the Air") attacked Delta and Guerrero Maya, Jr., stealing their masks and making a challenge for the team of Atlantis, Delta and Guerrero Maya, Jr. (collectively known as Los Reyes de la Atlantida, the Kings of the Atlantis) to defend their Mexican National Trios Championship. The challenge led to the main event with Los Depredadores facing Los Reyes in a best of three falls match. The first fall went to Los Depredadores when Black Warrior pinned Atlantis, while the second fall saw Delta pin Mr. Águila and Guerrero Maya, Jr. pinned Volador Jr. During the third fall Guerrero Maya, Jr. got fed up with Los Depreadores Mascota Mije, who had interfered in the match, and threw him over the top rope onto Volador Jr. The final fall saw Mr. Águila eliminate Maya, then Delta pinned Águila to eliminate him from the match, in the end Volador Jr. pinned Atlantis to take the victory and the Mexican National Trios Championship.

=== Results ===
No.	Results	Stipulations
1	Molotov and Tigre Blanco defeated Disturbio and Inquisidor	Best two out of three falls Tag team match
2	Rey Cometa, Starman and Stuka Jr. defeated Puma King, Sangre Azteca and Virus	Six-man tag team match
3	Lady Apache, La Seductora and Princesa Blanca defeated Dark Angel, Estrellita and Goya Kong	Six-man tag team match
4	Diamante Azul, La Mascara and La Sombra defeated Los Guerreros del Infierno (Dragón Rojo, Jr., Rey Escorpión and Último Guerrero)	Six-man tag team match
5	Titán defeated Euforia	En Busca de un Ídolo Tournament Final
6	Los Depredadores del Aire (Black Warrior, Mr. Águila and Volador Jr.) defeated Los Reyes de la Atlantida (Atlantis, Delta and Guerrero Maya, Jr.) (C)	Six-man tag team match for the Mexican National Trios Championship

== June 29, 2012 ==
On June 29, 2012 CMLL held their annual summer show, that year it was called Infierno en el Ring, replacing their normal Super Viernes show.
