= List of CMLL Super Viernes shows in 2012 =

List of Super Viernes professional wrestling shows in 2010

2012
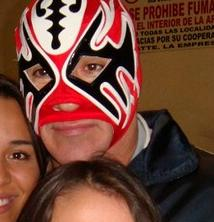
- Luchador Atlantis who wrestled the most Super Viernes matches in 2012, a total of 37 matches.

CMLL Super Viernes shows chronology
← Previous; 2011	Next → 2013

CMLL Super Viernes is professional wrestling promotion Consejo Mundial de Lucha Libre's (CMLL) Friday night wrestling show that takes place in Arena México every week unless a Pay-Per-View or a major wrestling event is scheduled to take place on that night instead. CMLL began holding their weekly Friday night "Super Viernes" shows as far back as 1938, with 2012 being no exception. Some of the matches from Super Viernes are taped for CMLL's weekly shows that air in Mexico the week following the Super Viernes show. The Super Viernes show was replaced by four major CMLL events in 20102, Homenaje a Dos Leyendas, Infierno en en Ring, the CMLL 79th Anniversary Show and Sin Piedad. The July 27, 2012 Super Viernes was one of only few Friday night shows to ever be cancelled, on this occasion due to a demonstration in the streets of Mexico City near Arena México.

The 2012 Super Viernes shows has hosted 7 championship matches in total, with 5 championship changes occurring. The following championships changed hands during 2012 on Super Viernes: CMLL World Women's Championship (March 9), NWA World Historic Middleweight Championship (March 30), Mexican National Trios Championship (June 22), CMLL World Tag Team Championship (August 3) and the NWA World Historic Middleweight Championship (September 28). Both the CMLL World Trios Championship (April 27) and the CMLL World Middleweight Championship (July 20) were successfully defended by the champions. Only one Lucha de Apuestas match was held on a Super Viernes, which featured Rey Escorpión defeating Black Warrior for the right to shave Warrior's hair off. The show traditionally hosts all the major tournaments, for 2012 that included the 2012 version of CMLL Reyes del Aire, Torneo Nacional de Parejas Increibles, Torneo Gran Alternativa, En Busca de un Ídolo, Campeon Universal Del CMLL tournaments. It also featured a one-night Cuadrangular de Tercias tournament.

The shows featured 256 matches, 221 matches in the male division, 24 featuring the female division and 11 featuring the Mini-Estrellas. 131 different wrestlers appeared in matches during CMLL's Super Viernes shows. Of those 131 wrestlers 18 were Mini-Estrellas and 19 were women. Atlantis wrestled 37 matches in total, the most of any individual wrestler. Marcela was the woman most often featured on Super Viernes with 15 matches, appearing in 62.5% of the women's matches booked for Super Viernes. Astral was the Mini-Estrella who had the most appearances, wrestling 7 times in total, or in 63.6% of all Mini-Estrella matches. Enrique Vera Jr., Morphosis, Loco Max, Ramstein, Taurus, Hikaru, Tsukasa, Lady Afrodita, Ayumi, Bam Bam, Shockercito and Pequeño Universo 2000 only worked on one Super Viernes during 2012 so far. (Note: The statistics are supported by the source for each show.)

== Super Viernes shows of 2012 ==
#	Date	Main Event	Ref(s).
1	January 6	El Bufete del Amor (Marco Corleone, Maximo and Rush) defeated La Peste Negra (El Felino, Mr. Niebla and Negro Casas) by disqualification	
2	January 13	La Generacion Dorada (La Mascara, La Sombra and Máscara Dorada) defeated Los Invasores (Mr. Águila, Psicosis and Volador Jr.)	
3	January 20	Blue Panther, La Mascara and Marco Corleone defeated La Peste Negra (El Felino, Mr. Niebla and Negro Casas)	
4	January 27	La Fuerza TRT (El Terrible and Rey Bucanero) and Volador Jr. defeated El Bufete del Amor (Marco Corleone, Maximo and Rush)	
5	February 3	Atlantis defeated Último Guerrero	
6	February 10	Blue Panther, Guerrero Maya Jr. and Máscara Dorada defeated La Peste Negra (El Felino, Mr. Niebla and Negro Casas) by disqualification	
7	February 17	Atlantis and Mr. Niebla defeated La Sombra and Mr. Águila	
8	February 24	El Terrible and Rush defeated Marco Corleone and Último Guerrero	
–	March 2	Event replaced with Homenaje a Dos Leyendas (2012)	
9	March 9	Atlantis, Diamante Azul and La Sombra defeated La Peste Negra (El Felino, Mr. Niebla and Negro Casas)	
10	March 16	El Felino, Último Guerrero and Volador Jr. defeated Atlantis, La Sombra and Shocker	
11	March 23	Marco Corleone, Prince Devitt and Rush defeated Mephisto, Último Guerrero and Volador Jr.	
12	March 30	Prince Devitt defeated Volador Jr. to win the NWA World Historic Middleweight Championship	
13	April 6	El Terrible, Negro Casas and Último Guerrero defeated Diamante Azul, La Mascara and Máscara Dorada	
14	April 13	El Terrible and Euforia defeated Atlantis and Tritón to win the Torneo Gran Alternativa 2012	
15	April 20	El Terrible, Euforia and Rey Bucanero defeated La Mascara, Maximo and Rush	
16	April 27	El Bufete del Amor (Marco Corleone, Maximo and Rush ) (c) defeated La Fuerza TRT (El Terrible, Rey Bucanero and Tiger)	
17	May 4	Atlantis, Rush and Shocker defeated La Peste Negra (Mr. Niebla and Negro Casas) and Volador Jr.	
18	May 11	Los Invasores (Psicosis and Volador Jr.) and Yujiro defeated El Bufete del Amor (Marco Corleone, Maximo and Rush )	
19	May 18	Negro Casas, Volador Jr. and Yujiro (w/Zacarias) defeated Atlantis, La Mascara and La Sombra	
20	May 25	Dragón Rojo Jr., Volador Jr. and Yujiro defeated La Sombra, Marco Corleone and Máscara Dorada	
21	June 1	Atlantis, La Mascara and Shocker defeated Mephisto, Volador Jr. and Yujiro	
22	June 8	Los Guerreros del Infierno (Rey Escorpión and Último Guerrero) and Yujiro defeated El Bufete del Amor (Marco Corleone, Maximo and Rush)	
23	June 15	Atlantis, Diamante Azul and Rush defeated Rey Escorpión, Último Guerrero and Yujiro	
24	June 22	Los Depredadores del Aire (Black Warrior, Mr. Águila and Volador Jr.) (w/Mije) defeated Los Reyes de la Atlantida (Atlantis, Delta and Guerrero Maya Jr.) to win the Mexican National Trios Championship	
–	June 29	Event replaced with Infierno en el Ring (2012)	
25	July 6	Los Hijos del Averno (Averno and Mephisto) and Volador Jr. defeated Diamante Azul, La Mascara and La Sombra	
26	July 13	La Sombra, Marco Corleone and Rush defeated Los Hijos del Averno (Averno and Mephisto) and Volador Jr.	
27	July 20	Atlantis, Diamante Azul and Rush defeated El Terrible, Negro Casas and Último Guerrero	
–	July 27	Event canceled due to a demonstration in Mexico City.	
28	August 3	Atlantis and Diamante Azul defeated Los Guerreros del Infierno (Dragón Rojo Jr. and Último Guerrero) to win the CMLL World Tag Team Championship	
29	August 10	La Peste Negra (El Felino, Mr. Niebla and Negro Casas) (w/Zacarias) defeated Los Invasores (Mr. Águila, Psicosis and Volador Jr.)	
30	August 17	Mr. Niebla defeated Volador Jr. by disqualification	
34	August 24	La Fuerza TRT (El Terrible and Rey Bucanero) and Último Guerrero defeated La Sombra, Rush and Shocker	
35	August 31	El Terrible defeated Hiroshi Tanahashi to win the 2012 Campeon Universal Del CMLL tournament	
36	September 7	El Bufete del Amor (Marco Corleone, Maximo and Rush ) (C) defeated Los Guerreros del Infierno (Dragón Rojo Jr., Rey Escorpión and Último Guerrero)	
–	September 14	Event replaced with CMLL 79th Anniversary Show	
37	September 21	La Fuerza TRT (El Terrible and Rey Bucanero) and Último Guerrero defeated La Mascara, Maximo and Rush	
38	September 28	Dragón Rojo Jr. defeated Prince Devitt to win the NWA World Historic Middleweight Championship	
39	October 5	El Bufete del Amor (Marco Corleone, Maximo and Rush) defeated La Peste Negra (El Felino, Mr. Niebla and Negro Casas)	
40	October 12	Diamante Azul won the 2012 Leyenda de Azul Tournament	
41	October 19	Dragón Rojo Jr., Rey Escorpión and Tama Tonga vs Los Guerreros del Infierno (Euforia, Niebla Roja, Último Guerrero)	
42	October 26	Dragón Rojo Jr., Rey Escorpión and Tama Tonga vs Los Guerreros del Infierno (Euforia, Niebla Roja, Último Guerrero)	
43	November 2	Rey Escorpión vs. Último Guerrero	
44	November 9	Volador Jr., El Terrible and Último Guerrero vs. El Bufete del Amor Marco Corleone, Rush and Maximo	
45	November 16	Atlantis, La Sombra and Místico La Nueva Era vs. Los Guerreros del Infierno (Euforia, Niebla Roja and Último Guerrero)	
46	November 23	Atlantis, La Sombra and Shocker vs. La Fuerza TRT (Tiger and El Terrible) and Tama Tonga	
47	November 30	Averno, Dragón Rojo Jr. and Rey Escorpión vs. Atlantis, Shocker and Titán	
48	December 7	Diamante Azul, Máscara Dorada and Rush vs. Los Hijos del Averno (Averno, Ephesto and Mephisto)	
–	December 14	Event replaced with the 2012 Sin Piedad show	
49	December 21	Mr. Águila, Psicosis, Volador Jr. vs. Diamante Azul, Marco Corleone, Máximo	
50	December 28	Blue Panther and Máscara Dorada vs Mr. Niebla and Negro Casas	
