= CMLL Super Viernes (July 2012) =

In July 2012 the Mexican professional wrestling promotion Consejo Mundial de Lucha Libre (CMLL) held three CMLL Super Viernes shows, all of which took place in Arena México on Friday nights. A Super Viernes was scheduled for Friday July 27, 2012 but had to be canceled due to demonstrations Yo Soy 132 in the neighborhood of Arena México. Some of the matches from Super Viernes were taped for CMLL's weekly shows that aired in Mexico the week following the Super Viernes show. The shows featured various professional wrestling matches with different wrestlers involved in pre-existing scripted feuds or storylines. Wrestlers portray either heels (referred to as "rudos" in Mexico, the "bad guys") or faces ("technicos" in Mexico, the "good guys") as they follow a series of tension-building events, which culminate in a wrestling match or series of matches. Being a professional wrestling event matches are not won legitimately; they are instead won via predetermined outcomes to the matches that is kept secret from the general public.

== July 6, 2012 ==
CMLL Super Viernes
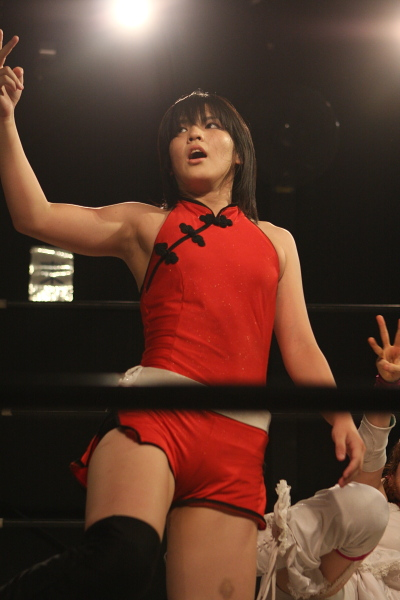
- Hikaru, one half of "Venus Muscle" visiting CMLL
- Promotion: Consejo Mundial de Lucha Libre (CMLL)
- Date: July 6, 2012
- City: Mexico City, Mexico
- Venue: Arena México

CMLL Super Viernes chronology
← Previous; Super Viernes June 22, 2012	Next → Super Viernes July 13, 2012

The July 6, 2012 Super Viernes was a professional wrestling event held by Consejo Mundial de Lucha Libre (CMLL) in their home arena Arena Mexico. The main event marked the return of Averno to the Super Viernes show after not appearing since March. Averno teamed up with Mephisto and Ephesto to take on Diamante Azul, La Mascara and La Sombra. The semi main event was a torneo cibernetico, multi man elimination match that featured the participants and mentors of CMLL's En Busca de un Ídolo ("The search for an idol") as the team of Último Guerrero, Euforia, Niebla Roja, Pólvora and Puma King taking on Atlantis, Diamante, Rey Cometa, Titán and Tritón. The show featured four additional matches including two Best two out of three falls Six-man tag team match, a "Lightning" and a tag team match.

=== Event ===
The opening contest of that week's Super Viernes was a tag team match between the tecnico team of Camaleon and Metálico facing off against the rudo brother duo known as Los Hombres del Camoflaje ("The Men in Camouflage"; Artillero and Súper Comando). The two teams each won a fall, taking the match to the third and final fall, which can only be won by pinning the "Team Captain" under traditional lucha libre rules. Artillero was the first man pinned and eliminated, but managed to sneak back inside the ring when the referee was distracted and cheated to help his brother Súper Comando get the victory by landing a low blow on Camaleon so Comando could pin him for the victory. In the second match of the night the holders of the Japanese "Reina X World's" Reina World Tag Team Championship, the team known as "Muscle Venus" (Hikaru and Tsukasa). Muscle Venus teamed up with the recently ruda turned Lady Apache for this match, the team faced Dark Angel, Estrellita and Marcela in a best of three falls match. In the third and deciding fall Dark Angel managed to lock Lady Apache into La Reienera (Modified spinning backbreaker rack) forcing her to submit to give the victory to Dark Angel, Estrellita and Marcela. The third match of the night was a one-fall match with a 10-minute time limit, called a "Lightning match" in CMLL, which had the leader of Los Cancerberos del Infierno and reigning CMLL World Lightweight Champion faced off against one half of the CMLL Arena Coliseo Tag Team Champions (Along with Stuka, Jr.) Fuego. Virus forced Fuego to submit by locking him into Virus' Campana submission hold after only six minutes and fourteen seconds of wrestling. In the fourth fall La Fiebre Amarilla ("The Yellow Fever") team of Namajague and Okumura joined forced with Misterioso, Jr. to take on the tecnico team of Delta, Hijo del Fantasma and Guerrero Maya, Jr. Normally Delta and Guerrero Maya, Jr. teamed with Atlantis to for a trio called Los Reyes de la Atlantida ("The Kings of the Atlantis") but Atlantis was involved in the semi-main event and Hijo del Fantasma filled the spot instead. The end came when Delta was able to pin Misterioso, Jr. in the third and final fall.

=== Torneo cibernetico ===
The semi-main event of the show was a torneo cibernetico, multi-man elimination match that involved all the participants of CMLL's En Busca de un Ídolo ("In Search of an Idol") tournament except for Dragon Lee who was replaced by Rey Cometa. Atlantis headed up one of the Busca teams that included Rey Cometa, Tritón, Titán and Diamante while Último Guerrero led the team of Puma King, Euforia, Pólvora, Niebla Roja. Rey Cometa was the first man eliminated after being pinned by his rival Puma King. Tritón was eliminated next, pinned by Euforia who gave his team a five on three advantage. Diamante evened the odds a little by pinning Pólvora, followed by Atlantis pinning Puma King to even the sides to three each. Diamante pinned Niebla Roja only to fall prey to Último Guerrero and was eliminated himself. Next Titán pinned Euforia, giving his team the two to one advantage as he and Atlantis faced the lone Último Guerrero. Guerrero eliminated former teammate Atlantis and then focused on Titán. Euforia returned to ringside just when Titán looked like he was about to win, distracting Titán so Guerrero could cheat to win the match. Following the match Último Guerrero and Euforia beat Titán down until Atlantis saved him, challenging Guerrero and Euforia to a tag team match the following week. Euforia was later announced as the newest member of Último Guerrero's Los Guerreros del Infierno group.

=== Main event ===
In the main event Los Hijos del Averno ("The Sons of Hell"; Averno and Mephisto) teamed up with one of CMLL's top rudos Volador Jr. to fight some of CMLL's top young tecnico prospects as Diamante Azul, La Mascara and La Sombra teamed up for the night. The rudo team won the first fall in short order, followed by La Sombra evening the score for his team. Throughout the match Averno targeted La Mascara, the man that unmasked Averno at the 2011 Juicio Final event while Volador Jr. focused on former tag team partner La Sombra. The third fall was the longest of the match and only ended when Volador Jr. pinned his longtime rival La Sombra after executing his Volador Spiral move.

=== Results ===
No.	Results	Stipulations
1	Los Hombres del Camoflaje (Artillero and Super Comando) defeated Camaleon and Metalico	Best two out of three falls Tag team match
2	Dark Angel, Estrellita and Marcela defeated Lady Apache and "Muscle Venus" (Hikaru and Tsukasa)	Six-man tag team match
3	Virus defeated Fuego	Lightning match (One fall, 10 minute time-limit match)
4	Delta, Hijo del Fantasma and Guerrero Maya Jr. defeated La Fiebre Amarilla (Namajague and Okumura) and Misterioso Jr.	Six-man tag team match
5	Último Guerrero defeated Atlantis, Diamante, Euforia, Niebla Roja, Pólvora, Puma King, Rey Cometa, Titán and Tritón	Torneo cibernetico match
6	Los Hijos del Averno (Averno and Mephisto) and Volador Jr. defeated Diamante Azul, La Mascara and La Sombra	Six-man tag team match

=== Torneo Cibernetico order of elimination ===
Order	Wrestler	Eliminated by
1	Rey Cometa	Puma King
2	Tritón	Euforia
3	Pólvora	Diamante
4	Puma King	Atlantis
5	Niebla Roja	Diamante
6	Diamante	Último Guerrero
7	Euforia	Titán
8	Atlantis	Último Guerrero
9	Titán	Último Guerrero

== July 13, 2012 ==
CMLL Super Viernes
- Poster for the July 13 event with Volador Jr. dressed like Darth Maul
- Promotion: Consejo Mundial de Lucha Libre (CMLL)
- Date: July 13, 2012
- City: Mexico City, Mexico
- Venue: Arena México

CMLL Super Viernes chronology
← Previous; Super Viernes July 6, 2012	Next → Super Viernes July 20, 2012

The July 13, 2012 Super Viernes was a professional wrestling event held by Consejo Mundial de Lucha Libre (CMLL) in their home arena Arena Mexico. The main event of the show was another chapter in the storyline feud between La Sombra and Volador Jr. who were once friends and tag team partners until Volador Jr. turned on La Sombra. At the previous week's Super Viernes Volador Jr. had teamed up with Averno and Ephesto to defeat La Sombra and his partners, this week Volador Jr. Averno and Mephisto faced off against La Sombra and two thirds of the CMLL World Trios Champions El Bufete del Amor ("The Law of Love") in the form of Marco Corleone and Rush. The semi-main event came about as the fallout from a torneo cibernetico elimination match the previous week which saw Euforia and Último Guerrero attack Atlantis and Titán after the match. The show featured four additional matches, including two Best two out of three falls Six-man tag team match, a tag team match and a one-on-one match.

=== Event ===
In the opening match the young tecnico (Wrestlers who portray the "good guy" characters) team of Horus and Robin defeated the experienced rudo (Bad guy") team of Los Hombres del Camoflaje (Artillero and Super Comando) two falls to one. The second match of the evening saw two substitutions compared to the originally announced match, instead of teaming with Metálico, Hombre Bala Jr. and Super Halcón Jr. teamed up with Stuka, Jr. while Bobby Zavala was taken off the other team and instead Disturbio and Nosferatu teamed with Hijo del Signo. This was Nosferatu's first match back with CMLL since 2011. The two teams split the first two falls with Hombre Bala Jr. Super Halcón Jr., and Stuka, Jr. taking the first fall and Disturbio, Nosferatu and Hijo del Signo won the second fall. The third fall ended when Stuka, Jr. pinned Nosferatu to take the victory for his team. The July 13 Super Viernes marked the first time Goya Kong wrestled unmask after having lost her mask in the main event of the 2012 Infierno en el Ring event. Goya Kong teamed up with Estrellita and Marcela to take on the woman that unmasked Goya Kong, Princesa Blanca and her partners Princesa Sujei and Tiffany. Goya Kong gained a small measure of revenge by pinning Princesa Blanca to win the first fall, leading to Tiffany getting her team disqualified for excessive violence against Marcela in the second fall. Following the match Marcela challenged Tiffany to a Lucha de Apuesta, hair vs. hair match between the two but Tiffany declined. The tecnico team of Diamante Azul, Sagrado and Shocker were accompanied by Mascota Ke Monito (A little person wearing a furry blue ape suit) as they took on the team of Black Warrior, Dragón Rojo, Jr. and Ephesto. The Rudo team represented three different CMLL factions as Black Warrior was part of Los Invasores ("The Invaders"), Dragón Rojo, Jr. part of Los Guerreros del Infierno ("The Infernal Warriors") and Ephesto represented Los Hijos del Averno ("The Sons of Hell"). Shocker proved an experienced ringleader as he led Diamante Azul and Sagrado to a two to one victory over their opponents. Following the match Black Warrior attacked Shocker, beating him down before CMLL officials could separate the two. The rivalry between Atlantis and Último Guerrero had developed long before they were selected to be the coaches for the En Busca de un Ídolo ("The search for an idol") tournament, but the tournament drew both tournament winner Titán and runner up Euforia into the storyline, at least for a short period of time. Euforia had joined Guerrero's Los Guerreros del Infierno less than a week ago as a result of the En Busca de un Ídol tournament and was eager to prove himself in this tag team match. The rivalry between the two teams led the tecnico team of Atlantis and Titán to employ rudo tactics as they intentionally unmasked their opponents during the third fall, using the distraction to pin them both and take the two to one fall victory.

=== Main event ===
Volador Jr. had a staredown with rival El Stinky Major ("The Great Stink"), Mr. Niebla before the match, but soon turned his focus on the match at hand as he teamed up with Los Hijos del Averno (Averno and Mephisto) to take on La Sombra, Marco Corleone and Rush. The highlight of the match was the interaction between La Sombra and Volador Jr. who have had a long series of critically acclaimed matches since Volador Jr. turned on his then tag team partner. After winning the second fall Volador Jr. acted confident and cocky, sure that his would once again defeat La Sombra, only for his opponent to surprise him with a head scissors takedown into a pin for the third and deciding fall.

=== Results ===
No.	Results	Stipulations
1	Horus and Robin defeated Los Hombres del Camoflaje (Artillero and Super Comando)	Best two out of three falls Tag team match
2	Hombre Bala Jr., Stuka Jr. and Super Halcón Jr. defeated Disturbio, Hijo del Signo and Nosferatu	Six-man tag team match
3	Estrellita, Goya Kong and Marcela defeated Las Ladies de Polanco (Princesa Blanca and Princesa Sujei) and Tiffany	Six-man tag team match
4	Diamante Azul, Sagrado and Shocker (with KeMonito) defeated Black Warrior, Dragón Rojo Jr. and Ephesto	Six-man tag team match
5	Atlantis and Titán defeated Los Guerreros del Infierno (Euforia and Último Guerrero)	Best two out of three falls Tag team match
6	La Sombra, Marco Corleone and Rush defeated Los Hijos del Averno (Averno and Mephisto) and Volador Jr.	Six-man tag team match

== July 20, 2012 ==
CMLL Super Viernes
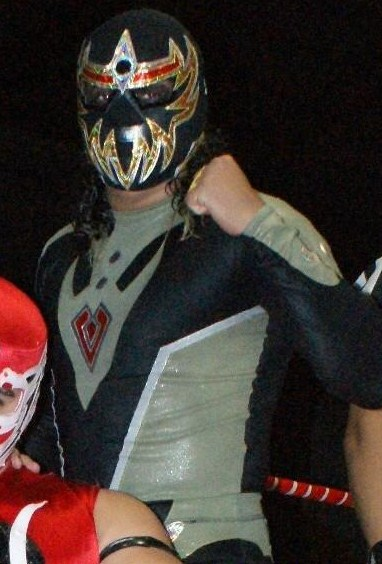
- Máscara Dorada's team lost to Los Invasores in the fourth match of the night
- Promotion: Consejo Mundial de Lucha Libre (CMLL)
- Date: July 20, 2012
- City: Mexico City, Mexico
- Venue: Arena México

CMLL Super Viernes chronology
← Previous; Super Viernes July 13, 2012	Next → Super Viernes July 27, 2012

The July 20, 2012 Super Viernes was a professional wrestling event held by Consejo Mundial de Lucha Libre (CMLL) in their home arena Arena Mexico. The main event was the first match for Negro Casas in Arena México for several months. Casas, the leader of the group La Peste Negra, teamed up with El Terrible, member of rival group La Fuerza TRT and Último Guerrero, leader of Los Guerreros del Infierno. They faced off against a more united team, consisting of Atlantis, Diamante Azul and Rush. Atlantis and Guerrero had a long running rivalry and Rush and El Terrible was in the middle of a storyline feud as well. In the semi-main event Titán received his reward for winning the En Busca de un Ídolo ("The search for an idol") in June as he challenged Dragón Rojo, Jr. for the CMLL World Middleweight Championship. The show featured four additional matches including three Best two out of three falls Six-man tag team matches and a tag team match.

=== Event ===
In the opening match the tecnico (term for wrestlers that portray the "good guys") team of Camaleon and Horus took on the rudo ("Bad guy") team of Apocalipsis and Cholo. The match went the full three falls before Camaleon and Horus could secure a victory. In the final fall of the match Cholo was hurt when Horus executed a move that did not go as planned and Cholo had to be taken out of the arena on a stretcher. In the second match the team known as Los Guerreros Tuareg (Arkangel de la Muerte, Nitro and Skándalo) took on the tecnico team of Pegasso, Starman and Tigre Blanco in a best of three falls match. Pegasso's team took the first fall, but Los Guerreros Tuareg fought back and won both the second and the third fall, with Nitro getting the deciding pinfall. The third fall of the night featured CMLL's women's division as Goya Kong, Luna Magica and Marcela faced the team of La Comandante, Lady Apache and Tiffany. The primary storyline was the developing rivalry between Marcela and Tiffany. Early in the match Tiffany gained an advantage for her team by cheating but in the end Marcela decided to pay her back in kind, illegally holding onto the ropes as she pinned Tiffany for the third and deciding fall. The two fought after the bell and had to be separated by CMLL officials. following the fight Marcela challenged Tiffany to put her hair on the line against Marcel. The high flying team of tecnicos consisting of Ángel de Oro, Máscara Dorada and Valiente took on Los Invasores (Kraneo, Morphosis and Psicosis II) in the fourth match of the evening. Los Invasores had their Mascota (a little person) Mije at ringside helping them distract the referee. During the third and deciding fall Mije was knocked down when Valiente fell onto him and had to be removed from the arena on a stretcher, it was unclear if this was a planned action or truly an accident. Los Invasores took the third and deciding fall to win the match.

=== CMLL World Middleweight Championship Match ===
One of the rewards given to Titán when he won the En Busca de un Ídolo ("The search for an idol") tournament was a match for the CMLL World Middleweight Championship against champion Dragón Rojo, Jr. The title match had been pushed back, first because of the En Busca de un Ídolo torneo cibernetico elimination match, then because Titán and Atlantis wanted revenge for the post-match attack of Último Guerrero and Euforia. Dragón Rojo, Jr. was accompanied to the ring by Skándalo, who was a member of the Los Guerreros Tuareg group, not Dragón's Los Guerreros del Infierno group, while Titán had Horus in his corner to prevent Skándalo from giving Dragón Rojo, Jr. an unfair advantage in the match. The match started out with the two of them exchanging a series of holds and exchanges on the mat, almost like an amateur style wrestling match, before Titán adopted the more high-flying, high-risk offensive he usually employs. The high-risk offense was also the key to Titán's loss in the first round as Dragón Rojo, Jr. took advantage of a mistimed move to gain the first fall. Rojo dominated early in the second fall, but Titán surprised the champion when reversing a move off the top rope and gained the second fall. The third fall saw both men exchange a number of moves and both trying to pin the other, but in the end Dragón Rojo, Jr. ended up trapping his opponent in a submission hold to win the third fall and successfully defend his championship.

=== Main event ===
The main event was an amalgamation of two ongoing storylines in addition to the return of Negro Casas to Arena México after several months of absence. One of the storylines was the ongoing issues between Atlantis and Último Guerrero that stretched back to 2011 when Atlantis left Guerrero's Los Guerreros del Infierno group. The other storyline centered around the issues between Rush and El Terrible, issues that had been escalating in intensity with several challenges made for a Lucha de Apuesta, hair vs. hair match between the two, which up until this point had not been made official yet. Atlantis and Rush teamed up with Diamante Azul to take on Negro Casas, El Terrible and Último Guerrero for the main event. Atlantis' team took the first fall, putting them ahead, but during the second fall Terrible's teammate Tiger and La Comandante (who is associated with both of them) came to the ring to distract Rush. With Rush distracted El Terrible broke a pane of glass over Rush's head drawing an immediate disqualification from the referee. El Terrible did not act bothered by losing the match, instead celebrated his attack on Rush and even challenged his opponent to a hair vs. hair match while Rush was taken out of the arena on a stretcher and thus was unable to answer the challenge.

=== Results ===
No.	Results	Stipulations
1	Camaleon and Horus defeated Apocalipsis and Cholo	Best two out of three falls Tag team match
2	Los Guerreros Tuareg (Arkangel de la Muerte, Nitro and Skándalo) defeated Pegasso, Starman and Tigre Blanco	Six-man tag team match
3	Goya Kong, Luna Magica and Marcela defeated La Comandante, Lady Apache and Tiffany	Six-man tag team match
4	Los Invasores (Kraneo, Morphosis and Psicosis II) defeated Ángel de Oro, Máscara Dorada and Valiente	Six-man tag team match
5	Dragón Rojo Jr. (C) defeated Titán	Best two-out-of-three falls match for the CMLL World Middleweight Championship
6	Atlantis, Diamante Azul and Rush defeated El Terrible, Negro Casas and Último Guerrero	Six-man tag team match

== July 27, 2012 ==
CMLL Super Viernes
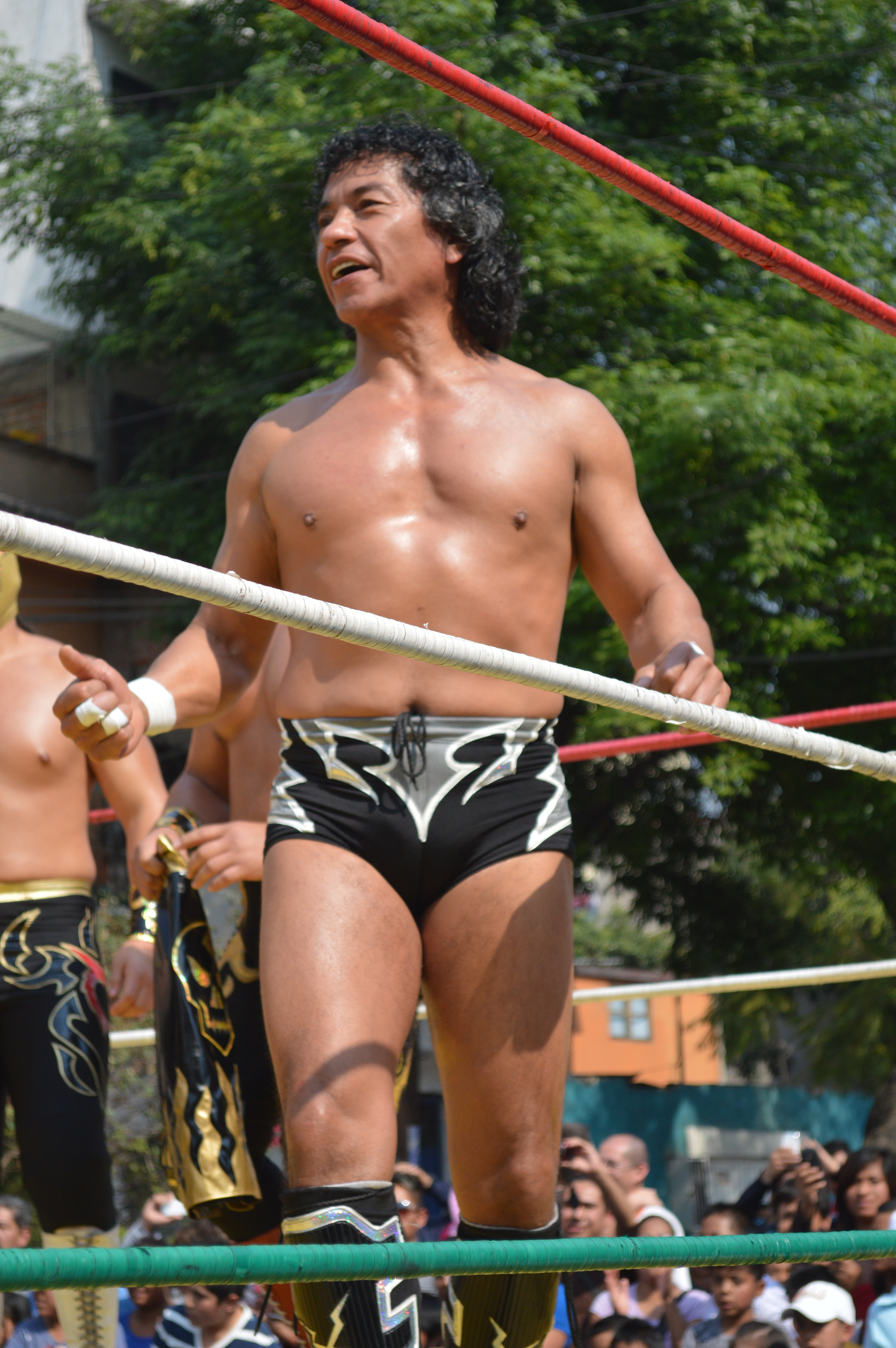
- Negro Casas, supposed to be in the main event.
- Promotion: Consejo Mundial de Lucha Libre (CMLL)
- Date: July 27, 2012
- City: Mexico City, Mexico
- Venue: Arena México
- Attendance: 0

CMLL Super Viernes chronology
← Previous; Super Viernes July 20, 2012	Next → Super Viernes August 3, 2012

The July 27, 2012 Super Viernes was supposed to be a professional wrestling event held by Consejo Mundial de Lucha Libre (CMLL) in their home arena Arena Mexico but had to be canceled. The Yo Soy 132 movement had arranged a protest outside the headquarters of the Televisa network that is only blocks away from Arena México. The protesters had spread to at least one street leading to Arena México and it was decided to cancel the event instead of risking their fans getting involved in any action the police might take against the protectors. This was one of the few instances of a Friday night show being canceled, with the previous two instances being the 1985 Mexico City earthquake and the Swine Influenza epidemic of 2009. CMLL resumed their normal schedule the following Sunday.

=== Planned show ===
No.	Matches*	Stipulations
1	Bengala and Leono vs. Inquisidor and Zayco	Best two out of three falls Tag team match
2	Hombre Bala Jr., Sensei and Super Halcón Jr. vs. Los Cancerberos del Infierno (Cancerbero and Raziel) and Skándalo	Six-man tag team match
3	Eléctrico vs. Demus 3:16	Lightning match (One fall, 10 minute time-limit match)
4	Diamante, Fuego and Tritón vs. Hijo del Signo, Misterioso Jr. and Vangelis	Six-man tag team match
5	La Sombra, Máscara Dorada and Shocker vs. La Fuerza TRT (Rey Bucanero and El Terrible) and Mr. Niebla	Six-man tag team match
6	Atlantis, Diamante Azul and Titán vs. Los Guerreros del Infierno (Dragón Rojo, Jr. and Último Guerrero) and Negro Casas	Six-man tag team match
*Card subject to change
