= CMLL Super Viernes (February 2012) =

Mexican professional wrestling show series

In February 2012 the Mexican professional wrestling promotion Consejo Mundial de Lucha Libre (CMLL) held four CMLL Super Viernes shows, all of which took place in Arena México on Friday nights. Some of the matches from Super Viernes were taped for CMLL's weekly shows that aired in Mexico the week following the Super Viernes show. The shows featured various professional wrestling matches with different wrestlers involved in pre-existing scripted feuds or storylines. Wrestlers portray either heels (referred to as "rudos" in Mexico, the "bad guys") or faces ("technicos" in Mexico, the "good guys") as they follow a series of tension-building events, which culminate in a wrestling match or series of matches. Being a professional wrestling event matches are not won legitimately; they are instead won via predetermined outcomes to the matches that is kept secret from the general public.

The primary storylines that played out on Super Viernes in February 2012 included the build to a Luchas de Apuestas ("Bet match") between Negro Casas and Blue Panther. The match between the two took place on March 3, 2012 at the 2012 Homenaje a Dos Leyendas show, but the build up of the storyline leading into the show culminated in February. CMLL also held the 2012 version of the Reyes del Aire ("Kings of the Air") tournament on February 3 as well as the preliminary rounds of their third annual Torneo Nacional De Parejas Increibles tournament, the finals of the tournament took place at Homenaje a Dos Leyendas.

== February 3, 2012 ==
CMLL Super Viernes
- Official poster
- Promotion: Consejo Mundial de Lucha Libre (CMLL)
- Date: February 3, 2012
- City: Mexico City, Mexico
- Venue: Arena México

CMLL Super Viernes chronology
← Previous; Super Viernes January 27, 2012	Next → Super Viernes February 10, 2012

The February 3, 2012 Super Viernes was a professional wrestling event held by Consejo Mundial de Lucha Libre (CMLL) in their home arena Arena Mexico. The main event was a Best two out of three falls match between former team mates, turned rivals, Atlantis and Último Guerrero. Atlantis was a member of Último Guerrero group Los Guerreros del Infierno ("The Infernal Warriors") and was such an integral part of the group that for a while they were known as Los Guerreros de Atlantida ("The Warriors from Atlantis"). In late 2011 Atlantis turned tecnico (also known as "Face", someone portraying the "good guy") and left the group, starting a storyline between the two that some expected to develop into a Lucha de Apuesta ("Bet match") where both men would put their mask on the line. The show only featured four matches, instead of the traditional six matches, a reduction that was done to accommodate the longer than average match time for the 2012 Reyes del Aire ("Kings of the Air") tournament. The match featured 16 wrestlers in total. The show was rounded out with a Best two out of three falls Six-woman tag team match and a tag team match.

=== Event ===
In the opening match the team of Metalico and Molotov defeated Bobby Zavala and Disturbio, winning the match two falls to one. Despite their loss as a team Bobby Zavala and Disturbio would continue to work as a team on various Super Viernes shows throughout 2012 working shows in April, May, June, August, September and October.

The second match centered on CMLL's female division, especially on the developing rivalry between La Amapola and Estrellita. For this show Amapola teamed up with Las Ladies de Polanco (Princesa Blanca and Princesa Sujei) while Estrellita had back up in the form of the rookie Dalys la Caribeña and the veteran Lady Apache. The two teams each won a fall, forcing the match to go to the full three falls and in the end La Amapola used the ring rope for illegal leverage to pin Estrellita to win the match.

=== Reyes del Aire 2012 ===
The Reyes del Aire ("Kings of the Air") tournament was contested under Torneo cibernetico elimination rules, which meant that two teams of nine would face off and whenever someone was pinned, forced to submit, counted out or disqualified they would be eliminated from the match. If there was more than one member of the surviving team left in the end then the team members would have to wrestle each other. For the 2012 tournament the tecnico team consisted of Ángel de Oro (2011 winner), Delta, Fuego, Guerrero Maya, Jr., Máscara Dorada, Rey Cometa, Stuka, Jr., Titán and Valiente. The rudo (also known as heels, someone portraying the "bad guy") team was composed of Euforia, Hijo del Signo, Mr. Águila, Pólvora, Puma King, Raziel, Rey Escorpión, Tiger and Virus.

The match started out with everyone taking a turn in the ring, displaying the high flying action that the "Kings of the Air" title referred. Rey Cometa was the first wrestler eliminated, which brought on a quick succession of eliminations as Puma King and Raziel soon took their exit. From this point on the two teams took turns eliminating one of their opponents as Titán, Hijo del Signo, Fuego, Euforia, Guerrero Maya, Jr. and Tiger were eliminated. About halfway through the eliminations Stuka, Jr. and Pólvora ended up eliminating each other as they were brawling and ignoring the referee's instructions which drew a double disqualification, resulting in both wrestlers being eliminated at the same time. The next couple of eliminations came in quick succession with Delta, Virus and Valiente being eliminated one by one. Máscara Dorada and Ángel de Oro executed a double team move on Rey Escorpión] to eliminate him as the 15th in the match. The match came down to the rudo Mr. Águila facing two opponents, Máscara Dorada and Ángel de Oro, for the tournament trophy. Mr. Águila was able to eliminate Máscara Dorada after he applied a Flip piledriver move. Following the elimination Máscara Dorada had to be carried out of the arena on a stretch. It was never confirmed in Máscara Dorada was actually injured or only pretending to be to play up the "devastating" effect of the Flip Piledriver move. In the end Mr. Águila got too careless, dismissing his much younger opponent, only to be trapped in Ángel de Oro's signature move, La Mecedora ("The Rocking chair"; a submission hold), and had to submit. The victory gave Ángel de Oro his second Reyes del Aire win.

=== Main event ===
The main event was another chapter in an on-again, off-again storyline between Atlantis and Último Guerrero that had started in the fall of 2011 when Atlantis left Último Guerrero's Los Guerreros del Infierno group. On this night Atlantis was accompanied by the tecnico "Mascot" Ke Monito, a little person wearing a furry blue monkey suite that accompanies a lot of the CMLL tecnicos to the ring. The building rivalry was immediately expressed by both competitors working a more aggressive style of match than they usually do, including repeated attempts by Último Guerrero to unmask his opponent, which in Lucha Libre is the ultimate dirty trick to use. Atlantis won the first fall of the match, causing Último Guerrero to retaliate, not just by trying to pull Atlantis' mask off, but by actually tearing it apart in places. Guerrero managed to win the second fall as he used the ropes for illegal leverage during the pin-fall, making sure to hide it from the referee. The third fall was the longest of the match and saw Atlantis retaliate by starting to tear Último Guerrero's mask apart too, using some of the same rudo tricks as his opponent. In the end Atlantis got the third and final fall, winning the match by using the ropes himself, mirroring the actions of Último Guerrero in the second fall. After the match Atlantis made a public challenge to Guerrero and his tag team partner Dragón Rojo, Jr. to defend the CMLL World Tag Team Championship against Atlantis and a partner of his choice, but Guerrero did not respond to the challenge.

=== Results ===
No.	Results	Stipulations
1	Metalico and Molotov defeated Bobby Zavala and Disturbio	Best two out of three falls Tag team match
2	La Amapola and Las Ladies de Polanco (Princesa Blanca and Princesa Sujei) defeated Dalys la Caribeña, Estrellita and Lady Apache	Six-man tag team match
3	Ángel de Oro defeated Delta, Hijo del Signo, Euforia, Fuego, Guerrero Maya Jr., Máscara Dorada, Mr. Águila, Pólvora, Puma King, Raziel, Rey Cometa, Rey Escorpión, Stuka Jr., Tiger, Titán, Valiente and Virus	Reyes del Aire 2012 Torneo cibernetico match
4	Atlantis defeated Último Guerrero	Best two-out-of-three falls match

=== Reyes del Aire 2012 order of elimination ===
Order	Wrestler	Eliminated by
1	Rey Cometa	
2	Puma King	
3	Raziel	
4	Titán	
5	Hijo del Signo	
6	Fuego	
7	Euforia	
8	Guerrero Maya, Jr.	
9	Tiger	
10	Pólvora	Stuka, Jr. (double elimination)
10	Stuka, Jr.	Pólvora (double elimination)
12	Delta	
13	Virus	
14	Valiente	
15	Rey Escorpión	
16	Máscara Dorada	Mr. Águila
17	Mr. Águila	Ángel de Oro
18	Ángel de Oro	Winner'

== February 10, 2012 ==
CMLL Super Viernes
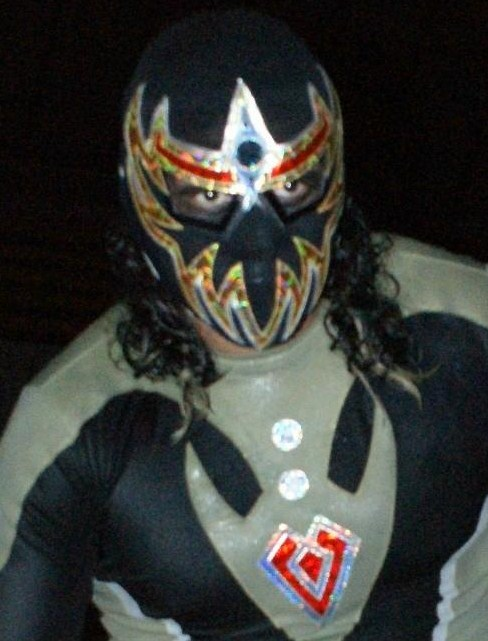
- Máscara Dorada, on the winning side in the main event.
- Promotion: Consejo Mundial de Lucha Libre (CMLL)
- Date: February 10, 2012
- City: Mexico City, Mexico
- Venue: Arena México

CMLL Super Viernes chronology
← Previous; Super Viernes February 3, 2012	Next → Super Viernes February 17, 2012

The February 10, 2012 Super Viernes was a professional wrestling event held by Consejo Mundial de Lucha Libre (CMLL) in their home arena Arena Mexico. The show featured six matches in total, with a main event Best two out of three falls Six-man tag team match that pitted Blue Panther, Guerrero Maya, Jr. and Máscara Dorada against the team known as La Peste Negra (El Felino, Mr. Niebla and Negro Casas). La Sombra was originally advertised for the match but was replaced on the night by Guerrero Maya, Jr. without an official explanation. The main rivalries on the show centered around Blue Panther and Negro Casas as well as the female wrestlers La Amapola and Estrellita who were on opposite sides of a Six-woman tag team match. The show featured four additional matches

=== Event ===
The first match of the show, a tag team match was supposed to include Zayco, but he had been stabbed in the back earlier in the week and was still in the hospital in critical condition at the time so he was replaced by Camorra. It was also one of Zayco's first matches back in the ring after recovering from being stabbed in the back and almost passing away from the attack. Camora and Bronco worked together and defeated Leono and Soberano Jr. The second match of the evening saw what could potentially be a longer-running storyline between Rey Cometa and Los Cancerberos del Infierno member Euforia. Rey Cometa teamed up with longtime tag team partner Pegasso as well as Diamante while Euforia teamed with his Los Cancerberos teammates Cancerbero and Raziel for this match. During the first and into the second fall Euforia kept attacking Rey Cometa, going so far as to land a low blow on Rey Cometa that led to Euforia's team being disqualified, losing the match in two straight falls. Puma King was accompanied to the ring by the National Autonomous University of Mexico's puma mascot Goyo for his Lightning Match against tecnico (The Spanish term for someone who plays a "good guy" character) Super Halcón Jr. Puma King defeated his inexperienced opponent in the one fall, 10 minute time limit match. The escalating rivalry between one of CMLL's established top female acts La Amapola and CMLL newcomer Estrellita was the driving force behind the fourth match of the evening with Estrellita teaming up with Dark Angel and Goya Kong while La Amapola had back up in the form of Las Ladies de Polanco (Princesa Blanca and Princesa Sujei). The two teams split the first two falls between them in quick fashion and then went to the third and final fall. The animosity between La Amapola and Estrellita escalated throughout the third fall, resulting in La Amapola trying to use the ropes for illegal leverage during a pinfall attempt. The referee noticed the infraction and did not award Amapola's team the victory, moments later Estrellita retaliated by using the ropes herself during a pinfall attempt, an action not noticed by the referee who counted to three and gave the match to Estrellita's team. The team of El Terrible, Rey Bucanero and Tiger, collectively known as La Fuerza TRT ("The TRT Power"), has been described as "The New Machine of Destruction" since their addition of Tiger to their ranks a few months earlier. On the night this nickname proved to be correct as La Fuerza TRT defeated the 2012 Reyes del Aire winner Ángel de Oro, La Mascara and Valiente two falls to one.

=== Main event ===
The driving storyline behind the main event match was the long building feud between Blue Panther and Negro Casas that started in the fall of 2011. Negro Casas teamed with the other members of his La Peste Negra ("The Black Plague") group, El Felino and Mr. Niebla and they were accompanied to the ring by Zacarias, La Peste Negra's "Mascot", a Mini-Estrella wearing a parrot outfit and mask and who would help La Peste Negra members cheat whenever the opportunity presented itself. La Sombra was supposed to team up with Blue Panther and Máscara Dorada but was replaced by Guerrero Maya, Jr. with no official explanation of the substitution given. The other four wrestlers only played a minor role in the match as the full focus was on the rivalry between Blue Panther and Negro Casas, a rivalry that saw Negro Casas intentionally kick Blue Panther in the groin and not caring that this action actually caused his team to lose by disqualification as hurting Blue Panther was more important. After the match Negro Casas picked up a microphone, as if he was about to address Blue Panther, but instead used it as a weapon to attack Blue Panther with. Once CMLL officials separated the two wrestlers Negro Casas officially accepted Blue Panther's challenge to put his hair on the line in a Luchas de Apuestas ("Bet match") at the 2012 Homenaje a Dos Leyendas show on March 2, 2012.

=== Results ===
No.	Results	Stipulations
1	Bronco and Camorra defeated Soberano Jr. and Leono	Best two out of three falls Tag team match
2	Diamante, Pegasso and Rey Cometa defeated Los Cancerberos del Infierno (Cancerbero, Euforia and Raziel)	Six-man tag team match
3	Puma King defeated Super Halcón Jr.	Lightning match (One fall, 10 minute time-limit match)
4	Dark Angel, Estrellita and Goya Kong defeated La Amapola and Las Ladies de Polanco (Princesa Blanca and Princesa Sujei)	Six-man tag team match
5	La Fuerza TRT (El Terrible, Rey Bucanero and Tiger) defeated Ángel de Oro, La Mascara and Valiente	Six-man tag team match
6	Blue Panther, Guerrero Maya, Jr. and Máscara Dorada defeated La Peste Negra (El Felino, Mr. Niebla and Negro Casas) by disqualification	Six-man tag team match

== February 17, 2012 ==
CMLL Super Viernes
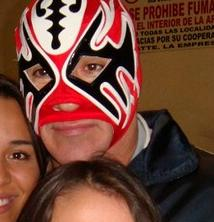
- Atlantis, teamed up with Mr. Niebla to win the qualifying round.
- Promotion: Consejo Mundial de Lucha Libre (CMLL)
- Date: February 17, 2012
- City: Mexico City, Mexico
- Venue: Arena México

CMLL Super Viernes chronology
← Previous; Super Viernes February 10, 2012	Next → Super Viernes February 24, 2012

The February 17, 2012 Super Viernes was a professional wrestling event held by Consejo Mundial de Lucha Libre (CMLL) in their home arena Arena Mexico. The show hosted the first round of the 2012 Torneo Nacional De Parejas Increibles tournament where the winners of the match would advance to the finals two weeks later. The tournament took up eight of the eleven matches on the show, which was rounded out by three additional under card matches, including the return of wrestler Dragon Lee in the second match, who returned after recovering from an injury.

=== Event ===
In the opening match the experienced team of Los Hombres del Camoflaje (Artillero and Super Comando) lost to Sensei and Tigre Blanco, who did not team up on a regular basis.

The second match of the night was Dragon Lee's first match back after an injury, teaming up with fellow tecnicos (wrestlers portraying the "good guys") Ángel Azteca, Jr. and Rey Cometa for this match. The team took on a group known as Los Guerreros Tuareg ("The Tuareg Warriors"), Arkangel de la Muerte, Nitro and Skándalo. Los Guerreros Tuareg won the first fall, but Dragon Lee took the second fall after executing a high risk areal move known as the shooting star press. The third fall saw Nitro pin Rey Cometa to ensure Dragon Lee's comeback match was not a successful one. The third match of the night, and the last non tournament match, saw former team mates (as part of Poder Mexica) turned rivals Sangre Azteca and Misterioso, Jr. on opposite sides in a Best two out of three falls Six-man tag team match, Azteca teamed with Sagrado and Fuego while Misterioso, Jr. teamed with Okumura and Vangelis. During the third fall Misterioso, Jr. failed to safely execute a Rosa Driver on Sagrado, which resulted in Sagrado having to be taken from the arena on a stretcher. The three on two advantage allowed Misterioso, Jr.'s team to take the victory, two falls to one.

=== Torneo Nacional de Parejas Increibles 2012 Block A ===
To determine the team match-ups in the tournament a representative of each team entered a Battle royal where the order of elimination determined when the team would wrestle in the first round – the first two wrestlers eliminated would face off, then the next two and the next two, with the final two men in the ring facing off in the last of the opening round matches. The first Battle Royal, included Euforia, Kraneo, La Mascara, Máscara Dorada, Máximo, Mr. Águila, Mr. Niebla and Valiente. The match ended with La Mascara and Valiente as the last two wrestlers in the ring, which meant their teams would meet in the final first round match that evening. In the first round 2010 and 2011 winner Máscara Dorada formed a very well functioning, high flying team with Volador Jr. to defeat the team of Guerrero Maya, Jr. and Euforia. The Parejas increibles concept was really highlighted in the second tournament match as Maximo, who plays an Exótico character, a character who is displays openly homosexual tendencies. During the match Maximo tried to kiss his opponents to distract them, but when denied he kissed his partner Mephisto instead. This enraged Mephisto who attacked his own partner and knocked him out, leaving him easy prey for La Sombra and Mr. Águila to move on to the next round. The other half of the 2010 and 2011 tournament winner, Atlantis set aside his differences with Mr. Niebla to allow the team to defeat Brazo de Plata and Kraneo, putting them in the second round. The final first round match saw Averno team up with the man that had forced him to unmask in 2011 at CMLL's Juicio Final ("Final Justice") show. The two got along just long enough to defeat Valiente and Olímpico, then Averno quickly left the ring, not even looking in La Mascara's direction. During the first of two second round matches Volador Jr. landed wrong during a leaping move and had to actually be taken from the arena on a stretcher while the match was still going on. It is unclear if Volador Jr.'s injury forced a change to the original plans or if La Sombra and Mr. Águila had been booked to win the match from the beginning. CMLL may have wanted the 2010 and 2011 winners to face off in the semifinal but due to Volador Jr.'s injury that matchup never happened. In the other first round match. The final second round match saw Atlantis continue his Parejas Increibles tournament success as Atlantis and Mr. Niebla defeated Averno and La Mascara, aided by problems between Averno and La Mascara that started when La Mascara accidentally hit Averno and then Averno retaliated to leave his partner open for an easy loss. The third round saw more success for Atlantis and Mr. Niebla as they earned a spot in the finals when they disposed of La Sombra and Mr. Águila in their one fall match.

=== Results ===
No.	Results	Stipulations
1	Sensei and Tigre Blanco defeated Los Hombres del Camoflaje (Artillero and Super Comando)	Best two out of three falls Tag team match
2	Los Guerreros Tuareg (Arkangel de la Muerte, Nitro and Skándalo) defeated Ángel Azteca, Jr., Dragon Lee and Rey Cometa	Six-man tag team match
3	Misterioso Jr., Okumura and Vangelis defeated Sagrado, Fuego and Sangre Azteca	Six-man tag team match
4	La Mascara and Valiente defeated Euforia, Kraneo, Máscara Dorada, Máximo, Mr. Águila and Mr. Niebla	Torneo Nacional De Parejas Increibles seeding Battle royal
5	Máscara Dorada and Volador Jr. defeated Euforia and Guerrero Maya Jr.	Torneo Nacional De Parejas Increibles 2012 first round Match
6	La Sombra and Mr. Águila defeated Maximo and Mephisto	Torneo Nacional De Parejas Increibles 2012 first round Match
7	Atlantis and Mr. Niebla defeated Brazo de Plata and Kraneo	Torneo Nacional De Parejas Increibles 2012 first round Match
8	Averno and La Mascara defeated Olímpico and Valiente	Torneo Nacional De Parejas Increibles 2012 first round Match
9	La Sombra and Mr. Águila defeated Máscara Dorada and Volador Jr.	Torneo Nacional De Parejas Increibles 2012 quarterfinal Match
10	Atlantis and Mr. Niebla defeated Averno and La Mascara	Torneo Nacional De Parejas Increibles 2012 First quarterfinal Match
11	Atlantis and Mr. Niebla defeated La Sombra and Mr. Águila	Torneo Nacional De Parejas Increibles 2012 semifinal Match

== February 24, 2012 ==
CMLL Super Viernes
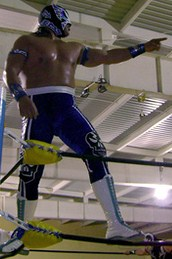
- Último Guerrero, along with Marco Corleone, was eliminated in the semi-finals.
- Promotion: Consejo Mundial de Lucha Libre (CMLL)
- Date: February 24, 2012
- City: Mexico City, Mexico
- Venue: Arena México

CMLL Super Viernes chronology
← Previous; Super Viernes February 17, 2012	Next → Super Viernes March 9, 2012

The February 24, 2012 Super Viernes was a professional wrestling event held by Consejo Mundial de Lucha Libre (CMLL) in their home arena Arena Mexico. The show hosted the second round of the 2012 Torneo Nacional De Parejas Increibles tournament where the winners of the match would advance to the finals the following week. The tournament took up eight of the eleven matches on the show, which was rounded out by three additional under card matches.

=== Event ===
In the opening match four of CMLL's Mini-Estrellas faced off in a tag team match as Pequeño Black Warrior ("Little Black Warrior") and Pequeño Nitro ("Little Nitro") take on Astral and Eléctrico. The third and deciding fall went to Astral and Eléctrico. The second match was scheduled to include female wrestler Zeuxis, but she was replaced by La Comandante with no official explanation given for the substitution. La Comandate teamed up with La Amapola and La Sedcutora as they lost to Dalys la Caribeña, Estrellita and Marcela two falls to one. The third match of the evening, also the last non-tournament match of the show, saw the team of tecnicos Diamante, Dragon Lee and Tritón team up to face rookie rudo (wrestler portraying a "bad guy" character) Hijo del Signo team up with La Fiebre Amarilla ("The Yellow Fever") consisting of Namajague and Okumura. During the third fall Tritón did a dive out of the ring, onto an opponent on the floor, hurting himself as the move did not go exactly as expected. Desptite Tritón being out of action Diamante still won the third fall for his team.

=== Torneo Nacional de Parejas Increibles 2012 Block B ===
In the week leading up to Block B competing, Rush stated that he was willing to set aside his differences with El Terrible as he wanted to win the Parejas Increibles tournament, despite the two having developed a heated rivalry over the last number of months. The second block matches started with a battle royal to determine the order of matches. The match included Ángel de Oro, Marco Corleone, Delta, El Felino, El Hijo del Fantasma, Pólvora, Rey Escorpión and Rush with El Felino and Ángel de Oro being the last two men in the ring. In the first round the team of Stuka, Jr. and Pólvora did not get along, playing off the two of them being disqualified from the 2012 Reyes del Aire ("Kings of the Air") tournament on the February 3, 2012 Super Viernes show. The dissension made it easy for Black Warrior and Rey Escorpión to win the first match of the tournament. In other first round matches Marco Corleone and Último Guerrero defeating El Hijo del Fantasma and Misterioso, Jr. Rush and El Terrible proved that they could indeed set aside their differences for at least one night as they worked well together to defeat Delta and Ephesto. While the final first round match featured the only all-rudo team in the tournament it did not mean that El Felino and Rey Bucanero got along at all, during the match Rey Bucanero left his former La Peste Negra partner alone in the ring as he walked out of the arena. The odds were too hard to overcome for Felino and he fell to Ángel de Oro and Psicosis. The first match in the second round saw two members of Los Guerreros del Infierno on opposite sides as Guerreros leader Último Guerrero teamed up with Marco Corleone and Guerrero team member Rey Escorpión teamed with Black Warrior. Initially the two Guerreros members avoided each other, but when they were finally in the ring with each other the fought like they had no allegiance with each other. The closing moments of the match saw Marco Corleone pin not just Black Warrior and Rey Escorpión but also his own teammate Último Guerrero when he got in the way of Corleone's move off the top rope. Guerrero expressed his displeasure at being pinned by his own team mate after the match. If the first second round match saw allegiances put aside for the tournament, the second match saw rivalry put aside for the tournament as Rush and El Terrible once again worked better together than expected as they defeated Ángel de Oro and Psicosis to become the second team in the semifinal match. In the third and final round of the evening Rush's promise to set aside differences and win the tournament turned out to be true as the two defeated Marco Corleone and Último Guerrero to earn the second spot in the tournament finals.

=== Results ===
No.	Results	Stipulations
1	Astral and Eléctrico defeated Pequeño Nitro and Pequeño Black Warrior	Best two out of three falls Tag team match
2	Dalys la Caribeña, Estrellita and Marcela defeated La Amapola, La Comandante and La Seductora	Six-man tag team match
3	Diamante, Dragon Lee and Tritón defeated Hijo del Signo and La Fiebre Amarilla (Namajague and Okumura)	Six-man tag team match
4	Ángel de Oro and El Felino defeated Delta, Hijo del Fantasma, Marco Corleone, Pólvora, Rey Escorpión and Rush	Torneo Nacional De Parejas Increibles seeding Battle royal
5	Black Warrior and Rey Escorpión defeated Pólvora and Stuka Jr.	Torneo Nacional De Parejas Increibles 2012 first round Match
6	Marco Corleone and Último Guerrero defeated Hijo del Fantasma and Misterioso Jr.	Torneo Nacional De Parejas Increibles 2012 first round Match
7	El Terrible and Rush defeated Delta and Ephesto	Torneo Nacional De Parejas Increibles 2012 first round Match
8	Ángel de Oro and Psicosis II defeated El Felino and Rey Bucanero	Torneo Nacional De Parejas Increibles 2012 first round Match
9	Marco Corleone and Último Guerrero defeated Black Warrior and Rey Escorpión	Torneo Nacional De Parejas Increibles 2012 quarterfinal Match
10	El Terrible and Rush defeated Ángel de Oro and Psicosis	Torneo Nacional De Parejas Increibles 2012 First quarterfinal Match
11	El Terrible and Rush defeated Marco Corleone and Último Guerrero	Torneo Nacional De Parejas Increibles 2012 semifinal Match
