= Lady Afrodita =

Mexican professional wrestler

Personal information
- Born: July 18, 1990 (age 36) Puebla, Puebla, Mexico

Professional wrestling career
- Ring name: Lady Afrodita
- Trained by: Fuerza Aerea; Arkangel de la Muerte; Franco Colombo
- Debut: 2009

Lady Afrodita (born July 18, 1990, in Puebla, Puebla, Mexico ) is a Mexican professional wrestler currently working for the Mexican promotion Consejo Mundial de Lucha Libre (CMLL) portraying a tecnico ("Good guy") wrestling character. Lady Afrodita's real name is not a matter of public record, as is often the case with masked wrestlers in Mexico where their private lives are kept a secret from the wrestling fans.

== Professional wrestling career ==
The wrestler later known as Lady Afrodita was born in Puebla, Puebla, Mexico on July 18, 1990. At the age of 18 she moved to Mexico City where she became a fan of lucha libre, or professional wrestling, especially Consejo Mundial de Lucha Libre's (CMLL) top performer Místico. She cited Místico as her inspiration to become a wrestler and she began training for a professional wrestling career at age 19. She initially trained under Fuerza Aerea, and later trained with CMLL trainer Arkangel de la Muerte. Through her training, she got to work with some of the top female wrestlers in CMLL such as Lady Apache, Marcela, La Amapola and Dark Angel. She made her professional debut in 2009, working primarily on the Mexican independent circuit, and made a couple of appearances for the Perros del Mal group. On July 17, 2011, she worked a match on a CMLL promoted show to celebrate the 25th anniversary of her mentor Arkangel. She teamed with Dalys la Caribeña to defeat the team of La Comandante and Mima Shimoda and was noted as "an outstanding student". Her connections with Arkangel landed her an opportunity to travel and wrestle in Japan for six months. Including several matches with one of CMLL's Japanese affiliates Universal Woman's Pro Wrestling Reina, where she would gain in-ring experience wrestling against various Japanese women such as Hirota and Kyoko Kimura. She also participated in Ice Ribbon's 19 O'Clock Girls ProWrestling Tournament during the tour, but was eliminated in the first round by Dorami Nagano.

=== Consejo Mundial de Lucha Libre (2012–present) ===
She returned to Mexico and began working regularly for CMLL in May 2012 While she had worked as a tecnica (wrestlers who portray the "good guys" also called "Faces") up until this point CMLL had her debut on the opposite side as a ruda ("Bad guy") as she teamed up with La Seductora and Tiffany, only to lose to La Silueta, Lluvia and Luna Mágica in her debut. She participated in an all female torneo cibernetico multi-man elimination match on the June 8 Super Viernes that also included Dalys la Caribeña, Estrellita, La Amapola, Lady Apache, La Seductora, Luna Mágica, Marcela and Tiffany and was won by Dark Angel. In August 2012 she moved from the rudo side to the tecnica side with no storyline or other explanation for the move as such.
