= Juicio Final (2014) =

Mexican professional wrestling supercard show

- The official poster for the event advertising the matches
- Promotion: Consejo Mundial de Lucha Libre
- Date: August 1, 2014
- City: Mexico City, Mexico
- Venue: Arena México

Pay-per-view chronology
← Previous; Leyenda de Azul	Next → Reyes del Aire

Juicio Final chronology
← Previous; 2012	Next → 2019

El Juicio Final (2014) (Spanish for "The Final Justice") was a professional wrestling major show event that was produced by Consejo Mundial de Lucha Libre (CMLL) which took take place on August 1, 2014, in Arena México, Mexico City, Mexico. This was the fourteenth time that CMLL used the name "Jucio Final" for one of their major shows.

The main event of the show was a Lucha de Apuestas, hair vs. hair match between Rush and Negro Casas. The undercard featured an additional Lucha de Apuestas match where the team of Marcela and Princesa Sugehit putting their hair and mask on the line against Princess Blanca and La Seductora who are also risking their hair and mask respectively on the outcome of the match. The show also featured a match between long time rivals La Sombra and Volador Jr. for the NWA World Historic Welterweight Championship and three additional matches.

== Production ==
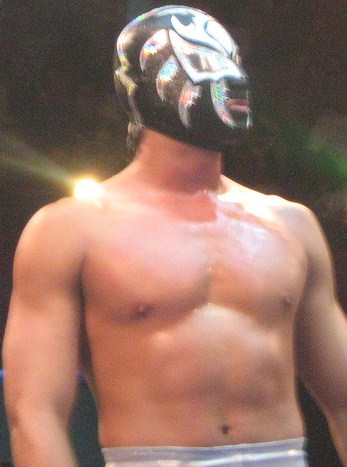
La Sombra who lost the NWA World Historic Welterweight Championship on the show.

=== Background ===
For decades Arena México, the main venue of the Mexican professional wrestling promotion Consejo Mundial de Lucha Libre (CMLL), would close down in early December and remain closed into either January or February to allow for renovations as well as letting Circo Atayde occupy the space over the holidays. As a result, CMLL usually held a "end of the year" supercard show on the first or second Friday of December in lieu of their normal Super Viernes show. 1955 was the first year where CMLL used the name "El Juicio Final" ("The Final Judgement") for their year-end supershow. Until 2000 the Jucio Final name was always used for the year end show, but since 2000 has at times been used for shows outside of December. It is no longer an annually recurring show, but instead held intermittently sometimes several years apart and not always in the same month of the year either. All Juicio Final shows have been held in Arena México in Mexico City, Mexico which is CMLL's main venue, its "home".

=== Storylines ===
The event featured six professional wrestling matches with different wrestlers involved in pre-existing scripted feuds, plots and storylines. Wrestlers were portrayed as either heels (referred to as rudos in Mexico, those that portray the "bad guys") or faces (técnicos in Mexico, the "good guy" characters) as they followed a series of tension-building events, which culminated in a wrestling match or series of matches.

The focal point of the Juicio Final show was the long running storyline feud between the rudo Negro Casas and Rush that started over a year earliere. The earliest encounters between the two came in clashes between Casas' team La Peste Negra ("The Black Plague"; El Felino and Mr. Niebla) and Rush, Marco Corleone and Máximo, a team known as El Bufete del Amor ("The Law of Love") but later escalated to a personal issue between Casas and Rush. Their rivalry led the two to be included in the main event of the 2013 Infirno en el Ring Steel cage match alongside eight other wrestlers. Both Rush and Negro Casas escaped the cage without losing their hair.| By the end of 2013 the storyline began to also include Shocker, who turned rudo and sided with Casas in the feud. On February 18, 2014 La Peste Negra defeated Rush and his teammates La Máscara and Titán to win the Mexican National Trios Championship. In the weeks following the title change Rush, Casa and Shocker all agreed to a three-way match under Lucha de Apuestas ("Bet match") rules where the loser would be shaved bald. The match was originally planned for the March 21 Homenaje a Dos Leyendas event, but Negro Casas dropped out of the match, declaring that he would rather face the winner later on. Rush defeated Shocker, forcing Shocker to be shaved bald after the event and immediately set his sights on Negro Casas. For months Rush had displayed less of a "fan favorite" or tecnico attitude during his matches without actually turning rudo in the process. Following the Homenaje show Rush began teaming with La Sombra, who was also displaying a more rudo attitude, announcing themselves as "técnicos diferentes" ("A different kind of good guy"). Soon after they were joined by La Máscara, to become a trio known as Los Indeseables ("The Undesirables"), later renamed Los Ingobernables ("The Ungovernables"). Casas and La Máscara won the CMLL World Tag Team Championship, but later lost the title to Negro Casas and Shocker.

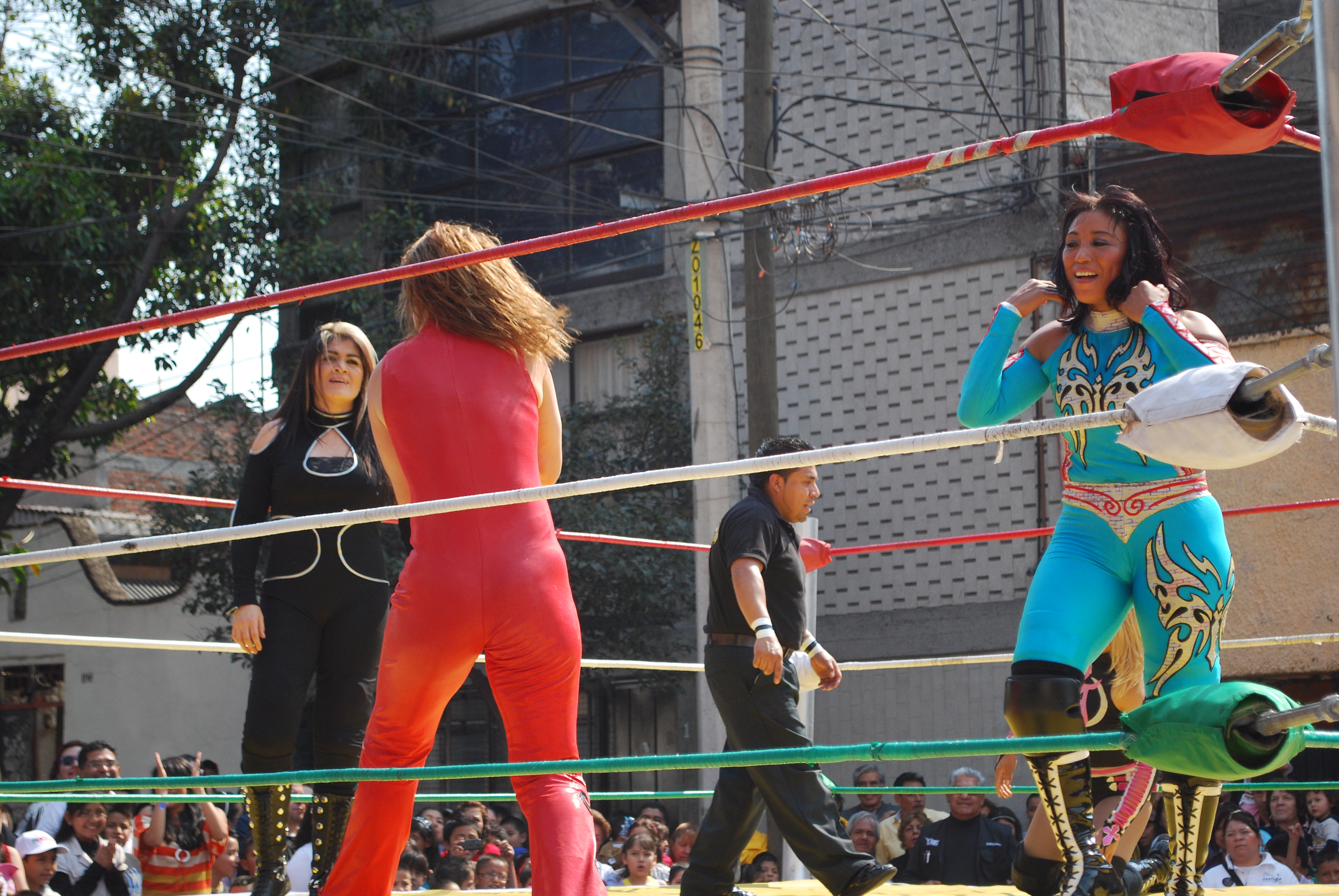
Marcela (in blue) and Princesa Blanca (in black), both put their hair on the line.

Titán was originally slated to compete in the fifth match of the night, but the day before the event it was announced that Máscara Dorada would replace him, due to Titán being unable to compete because of a foot injury.

The fourth match of the evening was another chapter in a long running feud between Volador Jr. and La Sombra, this time with La Sombra defending the NWA World Historic Welterweight Championship. Volador Jr. and La Sombra were originally a very successful tag team from 2008 to 2010, even holding the CMLL World Tag Team Championship for 542 days. The partnership ended when Volador Jr. turned on his partner in 2010, sparking a long running storyline between the two. Over the years La Sombra and Volador Jr. traded championships, even teamed together to win the 2013 Torneo Nacional de Parejas Increibles tournament. On September 13, 2013 La Sombra defeated Volador Jr. in the main event of CMLL's 80th Anniversary Show, forcing Volador Jr. to unmask. Following the match La Sombra began experiencing fan opinion turning against him and actually siding with Volador Jr. during subsequent encounters. In early 2014 Volador Jr. turned tecnico again, something that did not please La Sombra, especially when they were teamed up together. In subsequent months La Sombra joined forces with Rush and later La Máscara to form the group Los Ingobernables. On June 6, La Sombra defeated Volador Jr. to win the NWA World Historic Welterweight Championship, with help from Rush and La Máscara.

== Results ==
No.	Results	Stipulations
1	Delta, Guerrero Maya Jr. and Rey Cometa defeated Tiger, Puma and Skándalo – two falls to one	Best two-out-of-three falls tag team match
2	Ephesto, Euforia and Mephisto defeated Blue Panther, Máximo and La Mascara – two falls to one	Best two-out-of-three falls six-man "Lucha Libre rules" tag team match
3	Marcela and Princesa Sugehit defeated Princesa Blanca and La Seductora – two falls to one.	Best two-out-of-three falls Lucha de Apuestas, Hair and Mask vs. Hair and Mask match
4	Volador Jr. defeated La Sombra (C) – two falls to one	Best two-out-of-three falls match for the NWA World Historic Welterweight Championship
5	Rey Escorpión, Shocker and Último Guerrero defeated Atlantis, Dragón Rojo Jr. and Máscara Dorada by disqualification	Best two-out-of-three falls six-man "Lucha Libre rules" tag team match
6	Rush defeated Negro Casas – two falls to one	Best two-out-of-three falls Lucha de Apuestas, Hair vs. Hair match
