= La Seductora =

Mexican luchadora (born 1973)

Personal information
- Born: Irene Lagunas; October 20, 1973 (age 53) Chilapa, Guerrero, Mexico

Professional wrestling career
- Ring name: La Seductora
- Billed height: 1.63 m (5 ft 4 in)
- Billed weight: 63 kg (139 lb)
- Trained by: Chico Hernández; Arturo Beristain; Último Guerrero
- Debut: September 17, 1992
- Retired: February 24, 2023

Irene Lagunas (born October 20, 1973, in Chilachapa, Guerrero, Mexico) is a Mexican professional wrestler better known under the ring name La Seductora (Spanish for "The Seductress"). She is best known for working for the Mexican promotion Consejo Mundial de Lucha Libre (CMLL) portraying a ruda wrestling character. Originally working under a mask, Lagunas was unmasked after losing a match on August 1, 2014.

== Professional wrestling career ==
The woman known as "La Seductora" began training for a professional wrestling career in 1992 under Chico Hernández, who also coined the ring name "La Seductora", to go with her personality of being both charming and evil in the ring. Her career was put on hold for a number of years to have children, but once her two girls were old enough she returned to the ring, competing for Consejo Mundial de Lucha Libre (CMLL). On April 27, 2007, La Seductora competed to in a tournament to crown a new Mexican National Women's Champion when previous champion Lady Apache won the higher ranked CMLL World Women's Championship. Princesa Blanca was one of 14 women competing in a torneo cibernetico to qualify for the finals. The torneo cibernetico was won by Marcela and Princesa Sujei, eliminating La Seductora. In the summer of 2012 La Seductora began to develop a rivalry with the masked tecnica Goya Kong, a storyline many speculated may lead to a Luchas de Apuestas ("Bet Match") between the two where both would risk their masks on the outcome of the match. When the match was finally announced it did not just include the two women risking their masks, but an additional eight women who would all risk their hair on the outcome of the annual Infierno en el Ring steel cage match. Besides Goya Kong and La Seductora the match included La Amapola, Dalys la Caribeña, Dark Angel, Estrellita, Lady Apache, Marcela, Princesa Blanca and Tiffany. The match came down to Goya Kong and Princesa Blanca as everyone else, including La Seductora, escaped the ring to keep their hair or mask safe. On August 1, 2014, at El Juicio Final, La Seductora and Princesa Blanca were defeated by Marcela and Princesa Sugehit in a double Lucha de Apuestas; as a result La Seductora was forced to unmask and reveal her true identity.

La Seductora wrestled her final match on February 8, 2023, and announced her retirement on the 24th, due to a combination of COVID and her diabetes making training unfeasible. Nonetheless she has expressed interest in returning to the ring.

== Luchas de Apuestas record ==
Winner (wager)	Loser (wager)	Location	Event	Date	Notes
Marcela (hair) and Princesa Sugehit (mask)	Princesa Blanca (hair) and La Seductora (mask)	Mexico City	El Juicio Final	August 1, 2014	
La Seductora (hair)	Julissa (hair)	Cuautitlán Izcalli, Mexico State	Live Event	December 17, 2017	
Princesa Sugehit (hair)	La Seductora (hair)	Mexico City	62.Aniversario de Arena México	April 27, 2018	
