= Dalys la Caribeña =

Panamanian female professional wrestler

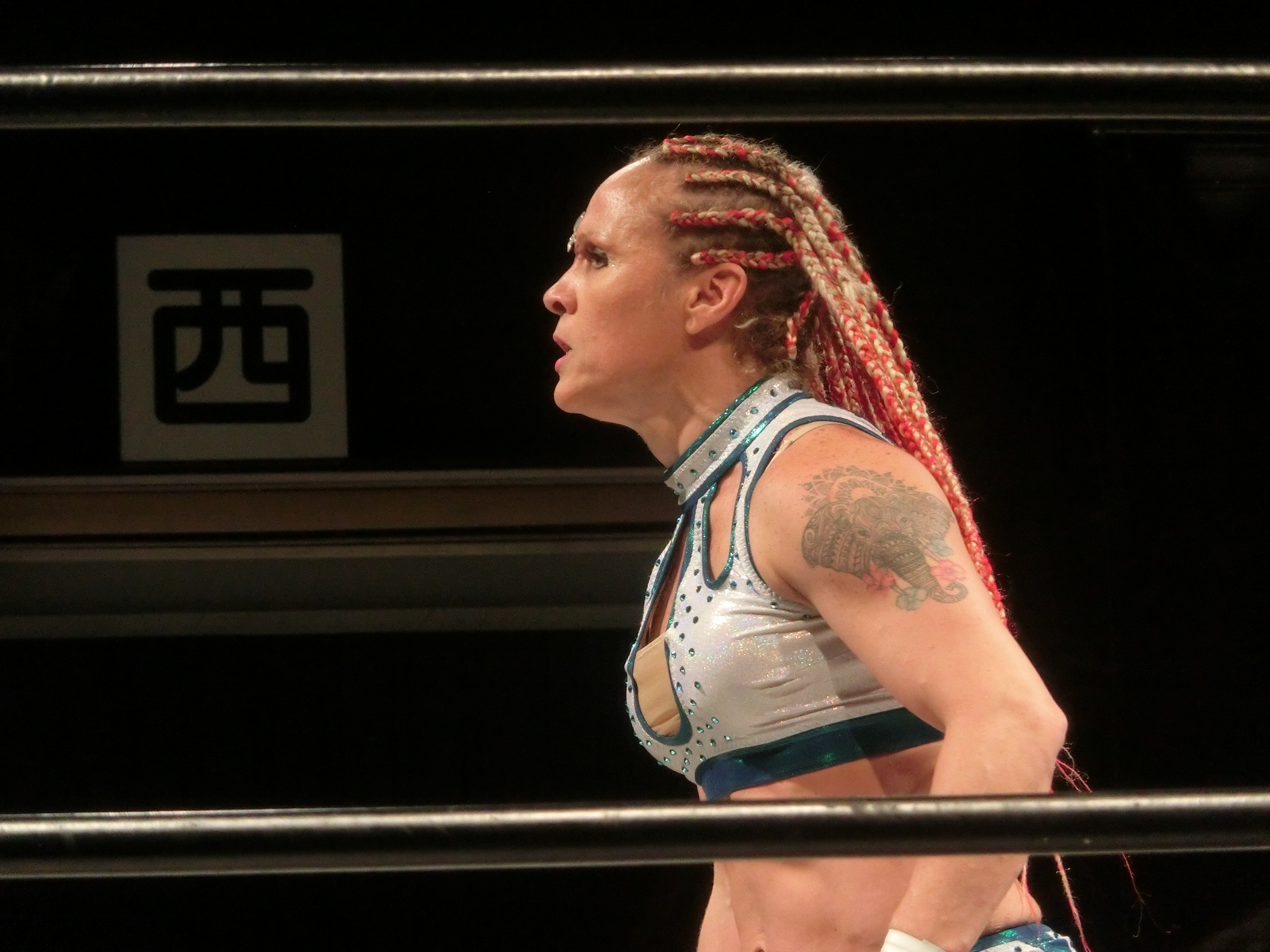
- Dalys in September 2018

Personal information
- Born: February 20, 1975 (age 51) Panama
- Spouse: Negro Casas
- Children: 2
- Family: Veneno (brother); Casas (by marriage); Diamante (son-in-law); Psycho Clown (son-in-law)
- Website: Facebook page

Professional wrestling career
- Ring name(s): Dalys; Dalys la Caribeña
- Trained by: Negro Casas; CMLL Wrestling School
- Debut: October 6, 2009

Dalys la Caribeña (Spanish for Dalys "The Caribbean Girl"; born February 20, 1975) is a Panamanian luchadora (or female professional wrestler), working for Lucha Libre AAA Worldwide (AAA). Her name appears in print as Dalys la Caribeña, Dalys, Dallys and Dalis, but all refer to the same person. She is a second-generation wrestler; her father is a retired wrestler turned wrestling promoter in Panama, her brother wrestles in Mexico under the ring name Veneno and she is related to the extended Casas wrestling family, through her marriage to Negro Casas.

Dalys is best known for her work in Consejo Mundial de Lucha Libre (CMLL), where she held the CMLL World Women's Championship and the CMLL Japanese Women's Championship both once.

== Personal life ==
Dalys' full birth name has not been publicly revealed, only that her last name by birth is Medina Baeza. She is the daughter of a Panamanian wrestling promoter and the sister of luchador Veneno. At some point, Mexican wrestler Negro Casas worked for her father's wrestling promotion, which led to the two being married circa 1990 and Dalys moving to Mexico City, Mexico. She is a member of the extensive Casas wrestling family by marriage. Her father-in-law is retired luchador and current referee Pepe Casas. Her brothers-in-law are Heavy Metal and El Felino, and she has another brother-in-law who is not a luchador. Dalys' sister-in-law (Felino's wife) Princessa Blanca is a fellow luchadora. Dalys and Negro Casas have two daughters who are training in Olympic style wrestling, also hoping to turn professional one day. Negro Casas does not train his daughters, entrusting that task to Ringo Mendoza, Tony Salazar, Arturo Beristain and Franco Colombo. One of her daughters is married to luchador Diamante, while the other is married to luchador enmascarado Psycho Clown. She also has two nephews who are luchador enmascarados under the ring names Felino Jr. and Puma King, the sons of Felino and step-sons of Blanca. She has a background in kickboxing and would be seen sparring with Negro Casas during features on him. She also sat at ringside during important matches and was acknowledged as his wife, although the focus on their family relationship has been downplayed since Dalys turned professional. The family relationship between Princesa Blanca, who works as a ruda (a wrestler that portrays the "bad guy" character) and Dalys la Caribeña, who works as a tecnica ("good guy") has also been downplayed by CMLL.

== Professional wrestling career ==
Dalys' training for an in-ring career was done initially by Negro Casas, but generally handled to the trainers of the Consejo Mundial de Lucha Libre (CMLL) wrestling school. Her first match came about sooner than originally planned as she was needed to substitute for wrestler Estrella Mágica in a match, teaming with Lady Apache and Star Fire to defeat the team of Hiroka, La Seductora and her sister-in-law Princesa Blanca. Since she was a last minute substitute her in-ring debut did not garner much attention from the press. Her officially promoted in-ring debut came almost two months later as she was one of ten women competing in a torneo cibernetico, multi-man elimination match for the rights to challenge for the CMLL World Women's Championship. The match also included Estrella Mágica, Hiroka, Lady Apache, La Nazi, Lluvia, Princesa Blanca, Princesa Sugehit, Zeuxis and match winner Marcela. On June 18, 2010, she participated in her first major CMLL event with an appearance during the 2012 Infierno en el Ring show. She was brought in as a replacement for Luna Mágica who was originally scheduled to team with Lady Apache and Marcela. The team wrestled against Las Zorras ("The Foxes"; Princesa Blanca and Princesa Sugehit) and La Seductora. Las Zorras took the first fall after Princesa Sugehit pinned Lady Apache following a Torbellino splash and Princesa Blanca pinned Dalys. In the second fall the tecnicas regained momentum when Marcela executed what was described as a "brutal Michinoku Driver" on La Seductora and pinned her. In the final fall Dalys la Caribena uses the Casas family trademark La Casita cradle to gain the three count and the victory for her team. She was also part of the 2011 Sin Piedad ("Without mercy") show, she worked in the second match of the night, a Best two-out-of-three falls Six-man tag team match with the Tecnica team of Dalys, Lady Apache and Marcela faced off against Princesa Sugehit, Princesa Blanca and Tiffany. The teams split the first two falls with Dalys, Apache and Marcela winning the first fall and their opponents winning the second fall. In the third fall Princesa Blanca accidentally kicked the referee, which led to her team being disqualified in the third fall and thus losing the match. Through her contacts in CMLL Dalys was able to travel to Japan in April and May, 2012 working on shows for CMLL's partner promotion Reina X World as well as a Kaientai Dojo show. Throughout the month of June a number of CMLL's female competitors got involved in various storylines that escalated to the point where they were all put into one match to settle their issues. The match was the main event of the 2012 Infierno en el Ring event, competing in the eponymous Infierno en el Ring steel cage match, a multi-person Steel cage match contested under Lucha de Apuestas, or bet match, rules which means that the loser of the match would be forced to unmask or have their hair shaved off per Lucha Libre traditions. Besides Dalys the competitors included La Seductora, Goya Kong, La Amapola, Estrellita, Dark Angel, Lady Apache, Tiffany, Marcela and Princesa Blanca. In the end Princesa Blanca pinned Goya Kong, forcing her to unmask afterwards. Dalys was the first person to escape the cage by climbing up over it, keeping her hair safe. She also appeared on CMLL's biggest show of the year, the CMLL 79th Anniversary Show where she, Goya Kong and Marcela defeated La Amapola, Princesa Blanca and Tiffany. On March 21, 2014, at Homenaje a Dos Leyendas, Dalys was defeated by Marcela in a Lucha de Apuestas and was as a result shaved bald. On March 11, 2016, Dalys defeated Marcela to win the CMLL World Women's Championship.

On January 21, 2023, Dalys and her husband Negro Casas appeared at a Lucha Libre AAA Worldwide (AAA) television taping in Querétaro, marking their departures from CMLL. On January 28, Dalys made her AAA in-ring debut, teaming with Lady Shani and Miss Delicious to defeat Maravilla, La Hiedra, and Mary Caporal during a house show. On February 5, at Rey de Reyes, Dalys participated in the 2023 Reina de Reinas match, which was won by Sexy Star II.

Dalys made her WWE debut on May 25, 2025 at NXT Battleground, where Chik Tormenta and herself were seated at ringside during the NXT Women's Championship match between reigning champion Stephanie Vaquer and Jordynne Grace as part of the partnership between NXT and AAA after WWE had acquired AAA in April 2025. At the WWE and AAA event Worlds Collide on June 7, Dalys teamed with Tormenta in a tag team match where they lost to Vaquer and Lola Vice.

== Championships and accomplishments ==
- Consejo Mundial de Lucha Libre
  - CMLL World Women's Championship (1 time)
  - CMLL Japanese Women's Championship (1 time)
  - CMLL Universal Amazons Championship (2019)
  - International Women's Grand Prix (2022)
  - Torneo Increible De Amazonas (2021) - with Princesa Sugehit
  - Copa Bicentenario (2022) – with Lady Frost
  - Copa Lucha Feminil X
  - CMLL Bodybuilding Contest: Women's Category (2013, 2015–19)
  - Copa Bobby Bonales 2022
- Pro Wrestling Illustrated
  - Ranked No. 70 of the top 100 female wrestlers in the PWI Female 100 in 2018

== Luchas de Apuestas record ==
Winner (wager)	Loser (wager)	Location	Event	Date	Notes
Marcela (hair)	Dalys la Caribeña (hair)	Mexico City, Mexico	Homenaje a Dos Leyendas	March 21, 2014	
