= Infierno en el Ring (2012) =

Mexican professional wrestling show

- Official poster of the event
- Promotion: Consejo Mundial de Lucha Libre (CMLL)
- Date: June 29, 2012
- City: Mexico City, Mexico
- Venue: Arena México

Pay-per-view chronology
← Previous; Pequeños Reyes del Aire	Next → Universal Championship

Infierno en el Ring chronology
← Previous; 2010	Next → 2013

Infierno en el Ring (2012) (Spanish for "Inferno in the Ring") was an annual professional wrestling major event produced by Consejo Mundial de Lucha Libre (CMLL), which took place on June 29, 2012 in Arena México, Mexico City, Mexico. The 2012 Infierno en el Ring replaced CMLL's regularly scheduled Friday night Super Viernes show. The 2012 Infierno en el Ring was the fourth show under that name, the 14th time CMLL have promoted an Infierno en el Ring cage match and the first time it featured women competing in the main event. The main event of the show was the eponymous Infierno en el Ring match that CMLL traditionally has traditionally held approximately once a year and which has headlined its own specific show since 2008. The Infierno en el Ring match is a multi-person Steel Cage match contested under Lucha de Apuestas, or bet match, rules which means that the loser of the match would be forced to unmask or have their hair shaved off per Lucha Libre traditions. At the 2012 event 10 women participated, risking either their mask, (La Seductora and Goya Kong) or their hair (La Amapola, Estrellita, Dark Angel, Lady Apache, Tiffany, Marcela, Dalys la Caribeña and Princesa Blanca).

The show featured an additional five matches, three Best two-out-of-three falls six-man tag team matches, a Tag Team match and a Lightning match, a one fall match with a 10-minute time limit.

== Production ==
=== Background ===
The Mexican wrestling company Consejo Mundial de Lucha Libre (Spanish for "World Wrestling Council"; CMLL) has held a number of major shows over the years using the moniker Infierno en el Ring ("Inferno in the Ring"), all of which were main evented by a multi-man steel cage match, the eponymous Infierno en el Ring match. CMLL has use the Infierno en el Ring match on other shows, but will intermittently hold a show billed specifically as Infierno en el Ring, with the first such show held in 2008. It is not an annually recurring show, but instead held intermittently sometimes several years apart and not always in the same month of the year either. All Infierno en el Ring shows have been held in Arena México in Mexico City, Mexico which is CMLL's main venue, its "home". Traditionally CMLL holds their major events on Friday Nights, which means the Infierno en el Ring shows replace their regularly scheduled Super Viernes show. The 2012 Infierno en el Ring show was the fourth show to use the name.

=== Storylines ===
The event featured six professional wrestling matches with different wrestlers involved in pre-existing scripted feuds, plots and storylines. Wrestlers were portrayed as either heels (referred to as rudos in Mexico, those that portray the "bad guys") or faces (técnicos in Mexico, the "good guy" characters) as they followed a series of tension-building events, which culminated in a wrestling match or series of matches.

== Results ==
No.	Results	Stipulations	Times
1	Metálico and Starman defeated Los Cancerberos del Infierno (Cancerbero and Raziel) by Disqualification	Best two-out-of-three falls tag team match	—
2	Rey Cometa, El Sagrado and Stuka Jr. defeated Misterioso Jr., Puma King and Virus	Best two-out-of-three falls six-man lucha libre rules tag team match	—
3	Valiente defeated Ephesto	Lightning match (One fall, 10 minute time limit)	05:59
4	Diamante Azul, Máximo and Rush defeated Volador Jr., Rey Bucanero and Mr. Águila	Best two-out-of-three falls six-man lucha libre rules tag team match	—
5	Los Guerreros del Infierno (Último Guerrero and Dragon Rojo Jr. and Euforia) defeated La Sombra, Atlantis and Titán	Best two-out-of-three falls six-man lucha libre rules tag team match	—
6	Princesa Blanca defeated Goya Kong; Also in the match: La Amapola, Estrellita, Dark Angel, Lady Apache, Tiffany, Marcela, La Seductora and Dalys la Caribeña	10-woman Infierno en el Ring, Lucha de Apuestas Hair vs. Hair Steel cage match	—

=== Order of elimination ===
#	Name
1	Dalys la Caribeña
2	La Seductora
3	Marcela
4	Tiffany
5	Lady Apache
6	Dark Angel
7	Estrellita
8	La Amapola
