= Princesa Blanca =

Mexican female professional wrestler

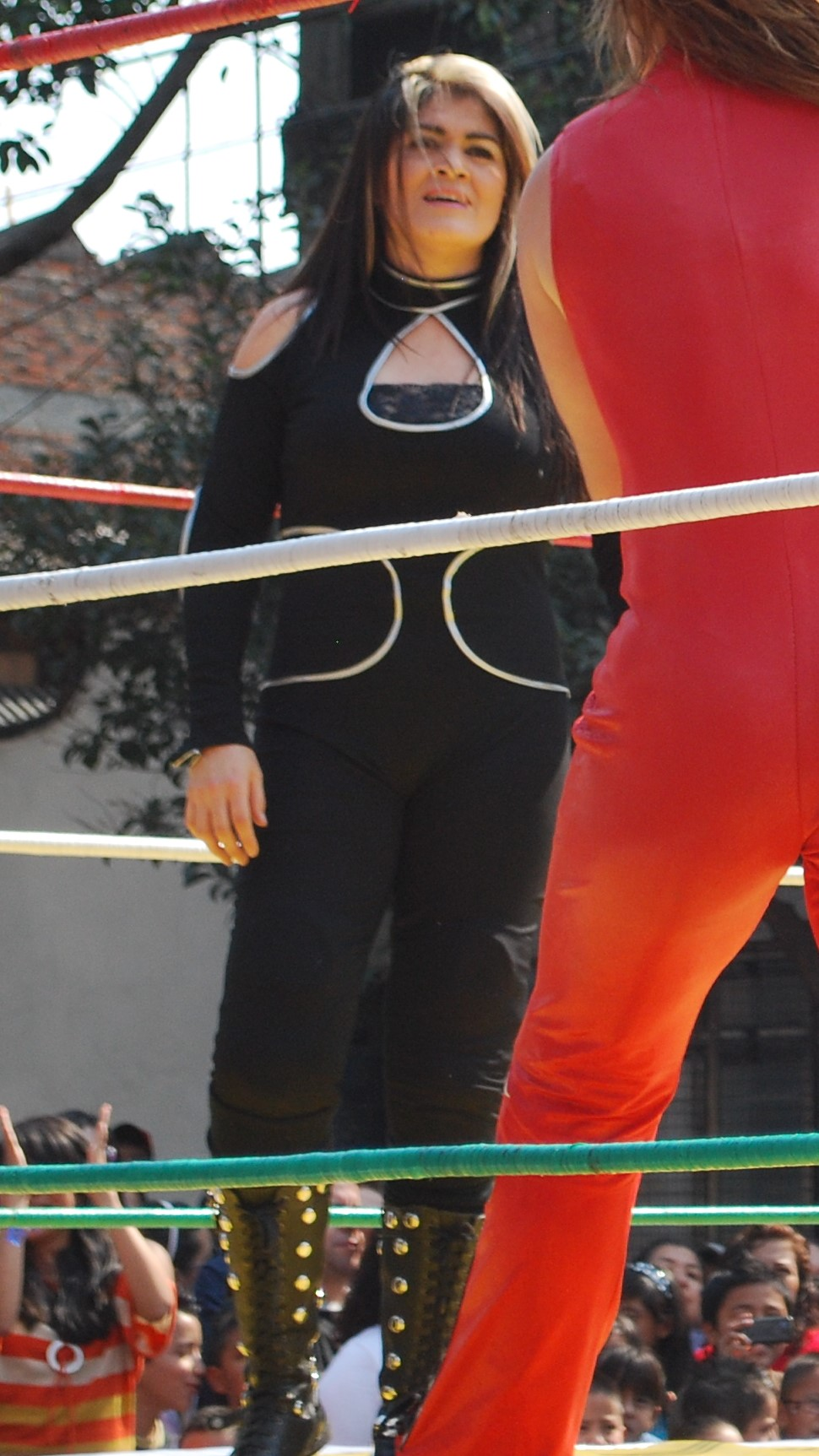
- Blanca (in black) in the ring in 2013

Personal information
- Born: Blanca Rodríguez; August 26, 1974 (age 51) San Luis Potosí, San Luis Potosí, Mexico
- Spouse: El Felino
- Relatives: Puma King (step-son); Tiger (step-son); Pepe Casas (father-in-law); Negro Casas (brother-in-law); Heavy Metal (brother-in-law); Dalys la Caribeña (sister-in-law)
- Family: Casas family

Professional wrestling career
- Ring name: Princesa Blanca
- Billed height: 1.74 m (5 ft 8 1/2 in)
- Billed weight: 62 kg (137 lb)
- Trained by: José Luis Feliciano; Franco Columbo; Tony Salazar; Último Guerrero; Rudo Valentino
- Debut: 1993
- Retired: August 1, 2014

Blanca Rodríguez (born August 26, 1974) is a Mexican retired professional wrestler, better known as Princesa Blanca. She is best known for her work with the Mexican promotion Consejo Mundial de Lucha Libre (CMLL), where she portrayed ruda ("Bad guy") wrestling character. Blanca held the Mexican National Women's Championship for 1,793 days, marking the longest individual reign to date. She is married to wrestler El Felino, which also makes her a part of the extended Casas wrestling family. Additionally, she is the stepmother to wrestlers Felino Jr. and Puma King.

== Personal life ==
Rodríguez was born on August 26, 1974, in the Mexican state of San Luis Potosí. Her parents introduced her to professional wrestling at an early age, igniting her passion for the sport and ultimately inspiring her to pursue a career as a professional wrestler. She looked up to Lola Gonzales, one of the pioneers of female wrestling in Mexico, as her role model.

During her training to become a professional wrestler and in her early years as an active competitor, she crossed paths with Jorge Luis Casas Ruiz, known in the ring as El Felino. With her marriage, she became the step-mother of three boys who currently wrestle under the ring names Rocky Casas, Puma King and Tiger from Casas' first marriage. She became a part of the Casas wrestling family, which include her brothers-in-law José "Negro" Casas Erick Casas (better known as "Heavy Metal") and a third Casas brother who is not involved in wrestling, father-in-law Pepe "Tropi" Casas, a former wrestler and current referee and sister in law of Luchadora Dalys la Caribeña (wife of Negro Casas). In addition, she is related to wrestler Delta through marriage as he is married to one of Negro Casas' daughters.

Rodríguez & Casas separated in the summer of 2014, which ultimately contributed to her retirement.

== Professional wrestling career ==
Rodríguez trained for her professional wrestling career under a number of different wrestling coaches including José Feliciano and Rudo Valentino. She later received additional training from the Consejo Mundial de Lucha Libre (CMLL) trainers Franco Columbo, Tony Salazar, and Último Guerrero. She made her professional wrestling debut in 1993, working as a tecnica or "face" (the wrestling term for someone who portrays a "good guy" character), using the ring name "Princesa Blanca" (Princess Blanca). Unlike most wrestlers in Mexico Rodríguez did not start her career wearing a mask. She began her career in the Universal Wrestling Association (UWA) and actually worked a few matches opposite her idol Lola Gonzales. She remained with the UWA until the UWA closed down in 1995. In the years following UWA closing down Princesa Blanca worked for a number of wrestling promotions in Mexico. In November 1995 she participated in a tournament for the TWF World Women's championship, a tournament co-promoted by CMLL and Japanese promotion JDStar. While she lost in the first round to Japanese wrestler Chikako Shiratori she made contacts with the Japanese promotion and was invited to tour with JDStar in 1996. Upon her return from Japan she occasionally worked for CMLL as the promotion did not regularly promote women's wrestling in the period between 1996 and 1999.

=== Lucha Libre AAA World Wide (1999–2005) ===
In 1999 Princesa Blanca began working for Lucha Libre AAA World Wide (AAA), CMLL's main rival in Mexico. In 2005, she participated in the annual Reina de Reinas ("Queen of Queens") tournament alongside Lady Apache, Tiffany, Cynthia Moreno, Dark Angel, Estrellita, Faby Apache, Golden Girl, La Chola, Martha Villalobos, Nikki Roxx, Poly Star, Princesa Sujei, Simply Luscious, and Veronica in a torneo cibernetico elimination match but was eliminated half way through the match.

=== Consejo Mundial de Lucha Libre (2006–2014) ===
Princesa Blanca left AAA and became a regular competitor for CMLL. On April 27, 2007, she competed to in a tournament to crown a new Mexican National Women's Champion, when previous champion Lady Apache vacated it after winning the higher ranked CMLL World Women's Championship. Princesa Blanca was one of 14 women competing in a torneo cibernetico to qualify for the finals, but the torneo cibernetico was won by Marcela and Princesa Sujei.

In early 2009 Princesa Blanca turned ruda ("bad guy") as she joined her husband and brother-in-law's group La Peste Negra ("The Black Plague"). Weeks after her turn she defeated Marcela to win the Mexican National Women's Championship, her first wrestling championship ever. Less than a month later Princesa Blanca was one of eleven women who risked their mask or their hair on the outcome of a steel cage match. In the end Princesa Blanca defeated Madusa to unmask her in a match that also included Lady Apache, Hiroka, La Nazi, Mima Shimoda, La Amapola, Sahori, Dark Angel, Goddess, and Marcela. Over the years Princesa Blanca developed a professional relationship with Princesa Sujei and Hiroka, creating a group known as Las Zorras ("The Foxes") and when Hiroka retired the two Princesas became known as Las Ladies de Polanco, "the ladies of Polanco", an affluent neighborhood in Mexico City. In 2010 Princesa Blanca developed a long running rivalry with Luna Mágica, building the storyline to the point where the two agreed to wager their hair on the outcome of a Luchas de Apuestas (Bet match) between the two. The two met on October 17, 2010, in Arena Mexico where Princesa Blanca defeated Luna Mágica, who was shaved completely bald after loss to Princesa Blanca. CMLL held an Infierno en el Ring match on June 29, 2012, which was a steel cage match where the loser of the match would be forced to either unmask or have their hair shaved off. Princesa Blanca and Goya Kong were the last two competitors in a match that also included La Amapola, Estrellita, Dark Angel, Lady Apache, Tiffany, Marcela, La Seductora and Dalys la Caribeña. Princesa Blanca pinned Goya Kong, forcing her to unmask after the match and announce her real name, Gloria Alvarado Nava, daughter of wrestler Brazo de Plata. On November 26, 2012, Blanca lost the Mexican National Women's Championship to Estrellita, ending her reign at 1,397 days, the longst individual reign of any women's champion. On August 1, 2014, at El Juicio Final, Princesa Blanca and La Seductora were defeated by Marcela and Princesa Sugehit in a double Lucha de Apuestas; as a result Blanca was forced to have her head shaved. Post-match, she also announced her retirement from professional wrestling.

== Championships and accomplishments ==
- Consejo Mundial de Lucha Libre
  - Mexican National Women's Championship (1 time)

== Luchas de Apuestas record ==
Winner (wager)	Loser (wager)	Location	Event	Date	Notes
Princesa Blanca (hair)	Madusa (hair)	Guadalajara, Jalisco	CMLL Live event	February 6, 2009	(Note: Steel cage match that also included Lady Apache, Hiroka, La Nazi, Mima Shimoda, La Amapola, Sahori, Dark Angel, Goddess and Marcela)
Princesa Blanca (hair)	Luna Mágica (hair)	Mexico City	CMLL Live event	October 17, 2010	
Princesa Blanca (hair)	Goya Kong (mask)	Mexico City	Infierno en el Ring	June 29, 2012	(Note: Main event of the 2012 Infierno en el Ring, Steel cage match that also included Dalys la Caribeña, La Seductora, Marcela, Tiffany, Lady Apache, Dark Angel, Estrellita and La Amapola.)
Marcela (hair) and Princesa Sugehit (mask)	Princesa Blanca (hair) and La Seductora (mask)	Mexico City	El Juicio Final	August 1, 2014	
