= Estrellita (wrestler) =

Mexican female professional wrestler

Personal information
- Born: Bibiana Ochoa Barradas; October 18, 1977 (age 48) Zamora, Michoacán, Mexico
- Spouse: Psicosis (ex-husband)

Professional wrestling career
- Ring name: Estrellita
- Billed height: 1.65 m (5 ft 5 in)
- Billed weight: 58 kg (128 lb)
- Trained by: El Hijo del Gladiador; Ringo Mendoza; Gran Apache
- Debut: February 26, 1993

Estrellita (Spanish for "Little Star") is the ring name of Bibiana Ochoa Barradas (born October 18, 1977 in Zamora, Michoacán, Mexico), a Mexican professional wrestler working for the Mexican promotion Consejo Mundial de Lucha Libre (CMLL) portraying a técnico ("Good guy") wrestling character. Estrellita worked for AAA for over 10 years.

== Professional wrestling career ==
Ochoa is the granddaughter of professional wrestler Rafael Barradas and decided to follow in his footsteps, becoming a professional wrestler herself in 1993 under the ring name Estrellita (Spanish for "Little Star").

=== AAA (1997–2009) ===
Estrellita began working for AAA around 1997 as a tecnica (wrestlers who portray the good guy characters or "Faces"). She participated in AAA's second annual Reina de Reina ("Queen of Queens") tournament, but did not win it. She also competed in the 2001 tournament, which was won by Lady Apache. She appeared at AAA's 2001 Guerra de Titanes ("War of the Titans") annual event, teaming with Esther Moreno and Princesa Sujei to defeat the team of Martha Villalobos, Mujer Demente and Tiffany. A few years later she also worked the 2005 Guerra de Titanes where she and Billy Boy would lose to Chessman and La Diabólica, as part of a tournament to determine the first holders of the AAA World Mixed Tag Team Championship.

Estrellita left AAA in 2009, joining the Perros del Mal wrestling promotion instead.

=== Consejo Mundial de Lucha Libre (2010–2021) ===
In September 2010 Estrellita appeared in Consejo Mundial de Lucha Libre (CMLL) as part of a group called Los Invasores, former AAA wrestlers playing off a storyline that they were "invading" CMLL. This marked the first time that Estrellita worked as ruda (Bad guy character). She made her first appearance at a major CMLL show when she teamed up with Tiffany and Mima Shimoda in a losing effort against Dark Angel, Luna Mágica and Marcela as part of the 2010 Sin Piedad show. A few months later she would split from Los Invasores as she had a falling-out with Tiffany. In the summer of 2012 Estrellita was one of several women began to develop rivalries with their fellow luchadoras, a storyline many speculated may lead to a Luchas de Apuestas ("Bet Match") between two of the women over the summer of 2012. When the match was finally announced it did not just include the two women risking their hair, but an additional eight women who would all risk their hair or mask on the outcome of the annual Infierno en el Ring steel cage match. Besides Estrellita the match included Goya Kong, La Seductora, La Amapola, Dalys la Caribeña, Dark Angel, Lady Apache, Marcela, Princesa Blanca and Tiffany. The match came down to Goya Kong and Princesa Blanca as everyone else had escaped the cage, including Estrellita who escaped the ring to keep their hair or mask safe. On October 27, 2012 Estrellita defeated Princesa Blanca to win the Mexican National Women's Championship. In late 2012 Estrellita became involved in a storyline feud with La Amapola, who took exception to Estrellita's AAA background, considering her an "outsider" in CMLL. Originally the focus was on the Mexican National Women's Championship, but over time it developed into a more personal and intense storyline between the two. On March 15, 2013 La Amapola lost a Luchas de Apuestas match to Estrellita on the under card of the 2013 Homenaje a Dos Leyendas show, which meant La Amapola was forced to have all her hair shaved off after the match. On January 19, 2015, Estrellita lost the Mexican National Women's Championship to Zeuxis.

== Championships and accomplishments ==
- Consejo Mundial de Lucha Libre
  - Mexican National Women's Championship (1 time)

== Luchas de Apuestas record ==
Winner (wager)	Loser (wager)	Location	Event	Date	Notes
Estrellita (hair)	Lady Night (hair)	N/A	Live event	N/A	
Estrellita (hair)	La Indomable (hair)	N/A	Live event	N/A	
Estrellita (hair)	Rossy Moreno (hair)	Nezahualcoyotl, Mexico State	Live event	March 25, 2008	(Note: This was a Steel cage match.)
Estrellita (hair)	La Amapola (hair)	Mexico City	Homenaje a Dos Leyendas	March 15, 2013	
