= El Bufete del Amor =

Professional wrestling trio team

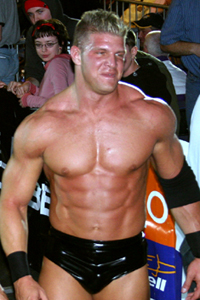
- Bufete member Marco Corleone

Tag team
- Members: Marco Corleone; Máximo; Rush
- Name(s): La Tercia Sensación; El Bufete del Amor
- Billed heights: 1.98 m (6 ft 6 in) - Corleone; 1.7 m (5 ft 7 in) - Maximo; 1.83 m (6 ft 0 in) - Rush
- Combined billed weight: 305 kg (672 lb)
- Debut: December 17, 2011

El Bufete del Amor was a professional wrestling trio team consisting of Marco Corleone, Máximo and Rush, working for Consejo Mundial de Lucha Libre (CMLL). They are former one-time CMLL World Trios Champions.

== History ==
On December 17, 2011, Marco Corleone, Máximo and Rush defeated Mr. Niebla, Negro Casas and Rey Bucanero in two straight falls. After the event, the trio of Corleone, Rush and Máximo was given the name La Tercia Sensación, which was later changed to El Bufete del Amor. On February 19, 2012, El Bufete del Amor defeated Los Hijos del Averno (Averno, Ephesto and Mephisto) to win the CMLL World Trios Championship. In the fall of 2012 El Bufete began a feud against the Mexican National Trios Champions Los Invasores (Volador Jr., Mr. Águila and Kraneo). The two teams fought several occasions with El Bufete's CMLL World Trios Championship on the line, while Los Invasores Mexican National Trios Championship being passed over compared to the more prestigious CMLL title. In May, Corleone was sidelined with a knee injury, leading to CMLL stripping him, Máximo and Rush of the CMLL World Trios Championship. On September 16, 2014, Corleone and Rush defeated El Terrible and Rey Escorpión to win La Copa CMLL. On October 3, 2014, Máximo participated in the 2014 La Copa Junior VIP tournament, qualifying for the finals by defeating Puma, Stuka, Jr. and then finally La Sombra (by disqualification) to qualify for the finals. On October 10, Maximo defeated Mephisto to win his first ever La Copa Junior.

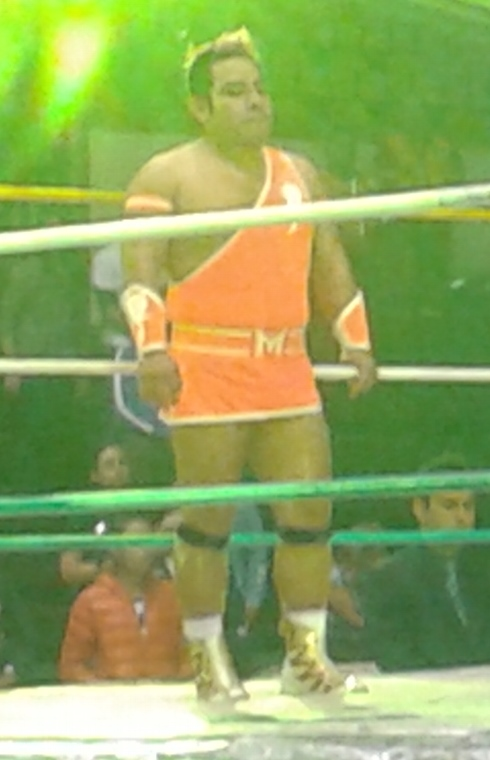
Bufete member Maximo

== Championships and accomplishments ==
- Consejo Mundial de Lucha Libre
  - CMLL World Trios Championship (1 time)
  - Copa CMLL (2014) – Corleone and Rush
  - La Copa Junior (2014 VIP) – Maximo
