= Tiffany (Mexican wrestler) =

Mexican female professional wrestler (born 1973)

Personal information
- Born: Xóchitl Leyva Sánchez; February 20, 1973 (age 53) Monterrey, Nuevo León, Mexico
- Spouse: El Kraneo (husband)

Professional wrestling career
- Ring name: Tiffany
- Billed height: 1.70 m (5 ft 7 in)
- Billed weight: 68 kg (150 lb)
- Trained by: Jesse Rojas
- Debut: July 18, 1993

Xóchitl Leyva Sánchez (born February 20, 1973) is a Mexican professional wrestler, best known under the ring name Tiffany. She has won the 2003, 2005, and 2008 Reina de Reinas tournaments and has held the Mexican National Women's Championship two times. After working for AAA for the majority of her career, she jumped to Consejo Mundial de Lucha Libre (CMLL) in September 2010.

== Personal life ==
Xóchitl Sánchez is a second-generation professional wrestler, the daughter of professional wrestlers Jesse Rojas and the original La Diabólica as well as the brother of Jessy, an Exotico wrestler. Sánchez is married to professional wrestler Kraneo, an masked wrestler who has also played the part of El Alebrije in the past. Since her husband is an masked his real name is not a matter of public record as per lucha libre (professional wrestling style originary from Mexico) traditions.

== Professional wrestling career ==
Sánchez was trained for her professional career by her father before making her professional wrestling debut on July 18, 1993, under the ring name "Tiffany".

=== AAA (1997–2010) ===
In 1997, Tiffany made her debut for the Mexican wrestling promotion AAA, one of Mexico's largest promotions, working primarily as a ruda, the lucha libre term for someone who portrays one a villain or bad guy in wrestling. On April 20, 2000, Tiffany ended Martha Villalobos' four-and-a-half year reign as the Mexican National Women's Champion in a show in San Luis Potosí, San Luis Potosí. In 2001, she competed in her first ever AAA Reina de Reinas tournament ("Queen of Queens") but was eliminated by eventual tournament winner Lady Apache. Later that year she began a storyline with Pimpinela Escarlata, a male Exotic wrestler, a storyline that led both wrestlers to bet their hair on the outcome of a Lucha de Apuestas ("bet match") at the 2001 Verano de Escandalo. The match ended in a draw and both wrestlers were shaved bald as a result. Her reign as the Mexican National Women's Championship ended on May 5, 2002, as Lady Apache defeated her for the title. In February, 2003 Tiffany defeated Lady Apache in the finals of the 2003 Reina de Reinas tournament, her first major victory in AAA. On September 16, 2003, Tiffany teamed up with Chessman to defeat the husband and wife team of Electroshock and Lady Apache to win the AAA World Mixed Tag Team Championship. The duo held the Mixed Tag Team Championship until August 1, 2004, where the father/daughter team of Gran Apache and Faby Apache won the championship from them. In early 2005, Tiffany became a two time Reina de Reinas tournament winner as she once again defeated Lady Apache in the finals of the tournament. In 2007, she became the only person to ever win three Reina de Reina tournaments defeating Sexy Star, Cynthia Moreno, Rossy Moreno, Miss Janeth and Faby Apache in a Battle Royal to win the tournament.

=== Consejo Mundial de Lucha Libre (2010–2024) ===
On April 12, 2010, a contingent of former AAA wrestlers including Psicosis II, Histeria, Maniaco, El Alebrije and Cuije showed up during a Consejo Mundial de Lucha Libre (CMLL) show in Puebla, Puebla, starting an "Invasion" angle where former AAA wrestlers would play out the storyline that Los Invasores came to CMLL to show that the AAA group was superior. Los Invasores promised a surprise for CMLL as part of the Promociones Gutiérrez 1st Anniversary Show, which turned out to be Tiffany, jumping from AAA to join Las Invasoras (female version of Los Invasores) alongside Estrellita. Tiffany, Estrellita and Rossy Moreno lost to the team of Lady Apache, Lluvia and Marcela by disqualification when Las Invasoras was caught pulling Lluvia's mask off. Following the show the Las Invasoras angle was only referred to for a couple of months, transitioning both Tiffany and Estrellita into CMLL's female division. On June 26, 2012, Tiffany was one of 10 women who risked their mask or hair inside a steel cage in the main event of CMLL's 2012 Infierno en el Ring summer show. Tiffany escaped the cage and watched from the outside as Princesa Blanca defeated and unmasked Goya Kong. Following the cage match CMLL's top tecnica Marcela challenged Tiffany to a one-on-one Luchas de Apuestas match, not happy with the outcome of the Infierno en el Ring match. Tiffany accepted and on the August 5 Super Viernes show Marcela defeated Tiffany, leaving her bald after the match. A few weeks later Tiffany made a trip to Japan to appear for CMLL's Japanese sister promotion Reina Joshi Puroresu. She completed in a tournament to crown the first ever Reina-CMLL International Championship, but lost to tournament winner Leon.| In September 2012, Tiffany teamed up with La Amapola and Princesa Blanca, losing to the team of Dalys la Caribeña, Goya Kong and Marcela on the under card of the CMLL 79th Anniversary Show, CMLL's biggest annual show. On September 19, 2014, Tiffany was one of eight women competing for the La Copa 81 Aniversario trophy in a Torneo cibernetico elimination match. Tiffany was eliminated by Princesa Sujei as the first wrestler eliminated in the match.

Left CMLL in late-March 2024, due to wanting to wind down her career & enjoy some creative freedoms a CMLL contract would not allow for (such as wrestling for The Crash).

== Championships and accomplishments ==
- AAA

- AAA Reina de Reinas Championship (3 times)
- AAA World Mixed Tag Team Championship (1 time) - with Chessman

- Comision de Box y Lucha D.F.

- Mexican National Women's Championship (2 times)

- Kaoz Lucha Libre
  - Kaoz Women's Championship (1 time)
- Mexican Independent Circuit
  - Northern Mexico Women's Championship (1 time)

== Luchas de Apuestas record ==
Winner (wager)	Loser (wager)	Location	Event	Date	Notes
Tiffany (hair)	La Diabólica (mask)	Monterrey, Nuevo León	Live event	N/A	(Note: Not the current La Diabólica but her mother.)
Tiffany (hair)	Lady Guerrera (mask)	Monterrey, Nuevo León	Live event	N/A	
Tiffany (hair)	La Intrusa (hair)	Monterrey, Nuevo León	Live event	May 10, 1998	
Draw	Tiffany (hair); Pimpinela Escarlata (hair)	Naucalpan, State of Mexico	Verano de Escandalo	September 16, 2001	(Note: They wrestled to a draw, both wrestlers lost their hair.)
Tiffany (hair)	Electroshock (hair)	Naucalpan, State of Mexico	Rey de Reyes	March 21, 2004	(Note: The match was Lady Apache and Electroshock vs. Chessman and Tiffany, Lady Apache was pinned but Electroshock offered his hair instead.)
Marcela (hair)	Tiffany (hair)	Mexico City	CMLL Super Viernes	August 5, 2012	
Tiffany (hair)	Gran Tiger (mask)	Monterrey, Nuevo León	Live event	November 1, 2015	
Tiffany (hair)	Diva Salvaje (hair)	Tihuatlán, Veracruz, Mexico	Live event	June 16, 2019	(Note: Losing team in a four-team Relevos Suicida match that also included Alisha La Guerrera/Rossy Moreno, Estrellita/Miss Janeth and Lolita/Diosa Haru)
