= Luna Mágica =

Mexican professional wrestler

Personal information
- Born: Maria De Los Angeles Aranda Ramirez; January 10, 1978 (age 48) Ciudad Madero, Tamaulipas, Mexico

Professional wrestling career
- Ring name: Luna Mágica
- Billed height: 1.50 m (4 ft 11 in)
- Billed weight: 55 kg (121 lb)
- Trained by: El Terco; Sagitario; Tritón; El Hijo Del Gladiador; Último Guerrero
- Debut: April 8, 1996

Luna Mágica (Spanish for "Magic Moon") is the ring name of Maria De Los Angeles Aranda Ramirez (born January 10, 1978, in Ciudad Madero, Tamaulipas, Mexico). Aranda is a Mexican professional wrestler currently working for the Mexican promotion Consejo Mundial de Lucha Libre (CMLL) portraying a tecnico ("Good guy") wrestling character.

== Personal life ==
Maria Aranda and Consejo Mundial de Lucha Libre (CMLL) Booking team member Franco Colombo have at least one child together, born in early 2009. Aranda took over 18 months off from wrestling while pregnant, followed by complications to her pregnancy that led her to have a longer recovery period than expected. She is the sister of CMLL and independent circuit wrestler Estrella Mágica ("Magic Star")

== Professional wrestling career ==
Aranda made her professional wrestling debut in 1996, working under the ring name Luna Mágica, initially competing on the independent circuit including the Monterrey-based Lucha Libre Femenil promotion. In 2005 CMLL restarted their women's division, adding a number of female competitors to their roster including Luna Mágica. On April 27, 2007, Luna Mágica competed to in a tournament to crown a new Mexican National Women's Champion when previous champion Lady Apache won the higher ranked CMLL World Women's Championship. She was one of 14 women competing in a torneo cibernetico to qualify for the finals. The torneo cibernetico elimination match was won by Marcela and Princesa Sujei, eliminating Luna Mágica. In 2010 Luna Mágica developed a long running rivalry with Princesa Blanca, building the storyline to the point where the two agreed to wager their hair on the outcome of a Luchas de Apuestas (Bet match) between the two. The two met on October 17, 2010, in Arena Mexico where Princesa Blanca defeated Luna Mágica, who was shaved completely bald after loss to Princesa Blanca. On December 6, 2011, during a CMLL show Luna Mágica and Lluvia defeated La Comandante and Zeuix to win the Reina World Tag Team Championship, a title promoted by Japanese wrestling promotion Universal Woman's Pro Wrestling Reina. The victory meant that the two traveled to Japan to defend the titles in early 2012. On January 29, 2012, Lluvia and Luna Mágica successfully defended the titles against Casandra and La Silueta. Later on the team would successfully defend the titles against the team of Aoi Ishibashi and Aki Kanbayashi. Near the end of their tour of Japan, on March 24, the team lost the championship to Zeuxis and Mima Shimoda.

== Championships and accomplishments ==
- Universal Woman's Pro Wrestling Reina

- Reina World Tag Team Championship (1 time) – with Lluvia

== Luchas de Apuestas record ==
Winner (wager)	Loser (wager)	Location	Event	Date	Notes
Luna Mágica (hair)	Reyna Vampira (hair)	Monterrey, Nuevo León	Live event	August 20, 2004	(Note: A Triangle match that also included Martha la Sarapera)
Luna Mágica (hair)	Martha la Sarapera (hair)	Monterrey, Nuevo León	Live event	October 1, 2004	(Note: A six person elimination match that also included Josseline, India Sioux, La Tigresa, Flor De Loto)
Princesa Blanca (hair)	Luna Mágica (hair)	Mexico City	Live event	October 17, 2010	
