= Arena México 57th Anniversary Show =

Mexican professional wrestling supercard show

- Promotional poster, advertising all six matches
- Promotion: Consejo Mundial de Lucha Libre
- Date: April 26, 2013
- City: Mexico City, Mexico
- Venue: Arena México
- Attendance: 17,500

Event chronology
← Previous; Gran Alternativa	Next → En Busca de un Ídolo

Aniversario de Arena México chronology
← Previous; 56. Aniversario	Next →: 58. Aniversario

The Arena México 57th Anniversary Show was a major professional wrestling event produced by Consejo Mundial de Lucha Libre (CMLL) that took place on April 26, 2013, in CMLL's home arena Arena México in Mexico City, Mexico. The event commemorated the 57th anniversary of the completion of Arena México in 1958. Upon its completion Arena Mexico became CMLL's main venue and has served as the host of almost all major shows since then.

== Background ==
The event featured six professional wrestling matches, in which some wrestlers are involved in pre-existing scripted feuds or storylines and others are teamed up with no backstory. Wrestlers themselves portray either villains (referred to as "Rudos" in Mexico) or fan favorites ("tecnicos" in Mexico) as they compete in matches with pre-determined outcomes.

The main event of the six-match show was for the vacant Mexican National Welterweight Championship between tecnico Místico La Nueva Era and the rudo Averno. The Mexican National Welterweight Championship was vacated on March 20, 2013, when the then-Champion Titán had to relinquish the title due to an injury. CMLL held a 10-man Torneo cibernetico, elimination match on the April 19, 2013, Super Viernes where the last two wrestlers in the match would face off on the Arena Mexico 57th Anniversary Show to determine the new champion. The elimination match included Averno, Fuego, Guerrero Maya, Jr., Místico La Nueva Era, Namajague, Rey Cometa, Tiger, Valiente, Volador Jr. and Sangre Azteca. Of the group Valiente and Sagre Azteca have held the Welterweight championship before. Of the ten competitors Sange Azteca and Valiente had both held the Mexican National Welterweight Championship. The Torneo Cibernetico saw Sangre Azteca eliminated as the first man by Fuego, followed by Guerrero Maya, Jr. (by Volador Jr.), Fuego (Tiger), Namajague (Disqualified for a low blow against Rey Cometa), Rey Cometa (by Averno), Tiger (by Valiente), Valiente (by Volador Jr.) and finally Volador Jr. was pinned by Místico, leaving Místico and Averno as the last two competitors. Averno had a long history with the character Místico, that had left CMLL in 2011 and Místico La Nueva Era was created to follow in his footsteps.

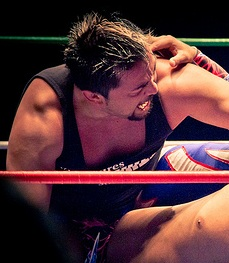
Averno one of the finalists for the Mexican National Welterweight Championship

The fifth match of the night was billed as Semifinal de Lujo ("The Luxury Semi-final"), a six-man tag team match between the trio of Máscara Dorada, Rush and La Sombra and the team of Último Guerrero, Volador Jr. and El Terrible. For this match CMLL brought together long running rivalries between La Sombra and Volador Jr. as well as Rush and El Terrible into one match. The addition of Máscara Dorada and Último Guerrero did not have any specific background at the time, with Guerrero focusing heavily on his conflict with Atlantis at the time. The rivalry between Rush and El Terrible started when El Terrible defeated Rush in the finals of a tournament to determine a holder of the CMLL World Heavyweight Championship on January 1, 2012. The two were also paired up for the 2012 Torneo Nacional de Parejas Increibles, and in the weeks leading up to the tournament Rush stated that he was willing to set aside his differences with El Terrible as he wanted to win the Parejas Increibles tournament, despite the two having developed a heated rivalry over the last number of months. After getting along and qualifying for the final match Rush and El Terrible's miscommunication and dissension allowed their opponents to win the match and the tournament. Following the match Rush took a microphone and berated both El Terrible and the fans for their actions that night and then followed it up by challenging El Terrible to a Lucha de Apuestas, hair vs. hair match at a later date. El Terrible did not accept the challenge at that point in time. The two faced off in the main event of the CMLL 79th Anniversary Show in a Lucha de Apuestas, hair vs. hair match that was won by Rush. The storyline continued to develop in the months following the anniversary event and included El Terrible successfully defending the CMLL World Heavyweight Championship against Rush on January 22, 2013. While La Sombra had travelled to Japan to participate in the 2010 Best of the Super Juniors (BOSJ) tournament Volador Jr. had begun showing rudo signs, but when La Sombra returned the two teamed up, seemingly without any problems. The duo lost the CMLL World Tag Team Championship to the Los Invasores team of Mr. Águila and Héctor Garza on July 23, 2010, again without any signs of dissention between the two. During a later show Volador Jr. finally turned rudo when he attacked La Sombra, tore his former partner's mask off and beat him up to start a feud between the two former partners. Over the years La Sombra and Volador Jr. have clashed repeatedly, in many match formats, many tournaments and for various championships such as La Sombra successfully defending the NWA World Historic Welterweight Championship against former partner Volador Jr., in a match, which received rave reviews. On February 15, 2013, La Sombra defeated Volador Jr. to win the 2013 Reyes del Aire tournament. Following their clash over the Reyes del Aire trophy Volador Jr. and La Sombra were teamed up for the 2013 Torneo Nacional de Parejas Increibles tournament, the same tournament that in 2010 was the impetus for Volador Jr.'s rudo turn. The rivals put their issues aside for the tournament defeating the teams of Guerrero Maya, Jr. and Negro Casas, La Máscara and Averno and finally Shocker and Mr. Niebla to qualify for the finals of the tournament. On March 15, 2013, at the 2013 Homenaje a Dos Leyendas show, Volador Jr. and La Sombra defeated Atlantis and Último Guerrero to win the Torneo Nacional de Parejas Increibles. The truce between La Sombra and Volador Jr. that allowed them to win the tag team tournament only lasted until the next time the two rivals were in the same ring. On February 17, 2013, La Sombra teamed up with Marco Corleone and Místico La Nueva Era against Volador Jr. Euforia and Último Guerrero. During the match Volador Jr. attacked both La Sombra and the referee, causing a disqualification before leaving the ring and his confused partners behind.

The third match of the night, a Lucha de Apuestas, or bet match between Rey Cometa and Japanese wrestler Namajague, was built upon a conflict that started during the previous year. The original conflict was between Namajague and his partner Okumua (collectively known as La Fiebre Amarilla) and the tecnico wrestler Stuka, Jr. In late 2012 the two began facing off on opposite sides of Six-man tag team matches on various weekly Super Viernes shows, CMLL's main weekly show. In November Stuka, Jr. often teamed with Rey Cometa to take on the Japanese team and Puma King, initially as a continuation of the storyline between Rey Cometa and Puma King, who had unmasked Rey Cometa at the CMLL 79th Anniversary Show, but began to morph into focusing on the escalating issues between Stuka, Jr./Rey Cometa and Fiebre Amarilla. On the November 23 Super Viernes La Fiebre was on the opposite side of Rey Cometa once again and Namajague tried once again to win the match by illegal means, only to be caught by the referee and disqualified as a result of his actions. On the last Super Viernes of 2012 La Fiebre teamed up with Vangelis to defeat the team of Fuego, Rey Cometa and Stuka, Jr. Over the next couple of weeks Stuka, Jr. and Namajague found themselves on opposite sides of six-man tag team matches, teaming with a number of different partners which did not always include Rey Cometa or Okumura. Both Rey Cometa and Namajague took part in the 2013 CMLL Reyes del Aire ("Kings of the Air") tournament on February 2 but due to their interaction and a mistimed move Namajague ended up landing wrong during a dive to the floor and had to be taken to the hospital, while moments later Rey Cometa also ended up hurt. Both accidents looked so bad that it put their participation in the follow week's Super Viernes in question, but in the end Rey Cometa teamed with Stuka, Jr. and El Hijo del Fantasma to take on and defeat Namajague, Okumura and Misterioso, Jr. Following the February 8 match Stuka, Jr. challenged Namajague to put his mask on the line in a Lucha de Apuestas, or bet match, an offer that Okumura "in his role as leader of Fiebre Amarilla" declined the challenge, wanting to face Stuka, Jr. himself. Rey Cometa responded to that challenge by issuing a team challenge, with himself and Stuka, Jr. against La Fiebre Amarilla for the team's mask and hair to be on the line. On Thursday February 21, 2013 CMLL held a press conference announcing, among other things, that the match between the two teams would officially take place at the 2013 Homenaje a Dos Leyendas as the main event of the show. The match was won by Rey Cometa and Stuka, Jr. with Cometa securing the victory by pinning Namajague in the third and final fall. The storyline between Namajague and Rey Cometa did not end after the unmasking, instead it switched to an individual storyline between the two, that included Namajague breaking a pane of glass over Rey Cometa's head during a one-on-one match. The conflict led to CMLL signing a one-on-one Lucha de Apuestas between with Cometa and Namajague's hair on the line as part of the Arena Mexico 57th Anniversary Show.

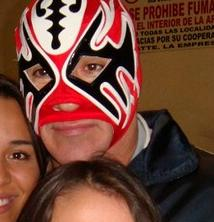
Atlantis, one of the finalists of the 2013 Gran Alternativa tournament.

CMLL announced that the finals of the 2013 Gran Alternativa tournament would be a part of the Arena Mexico 57th Anniversary Show. The Gran Alternativa tournament is an annual CMLL tournament, started in 1994 with the 2013 tournament being the 22nd overall tournament. The tournament concept pairs a Novato or rookie up with an experienced wrestler for a tag team tournament. The rookie winner is often elevated up the ranks of CMLL as a result of winning the tournament, but there is no specific prize. The 2013 tournament saw 16 teams in total compete, with two blocks of 8 for the initial blocks that took place on the April 12 and April 19 Super Viernes shows and the finals on April 26. Qualifying block A took place on April 12 and saw the teams of Akuma (Novato) and Mephisto, Disturbio (Novato) and Volador Jr., Guerrero Negro, Jr. (Novato) and Último Guerrero, Hombre Bala Jr. (Novato) and Atlantis, Oro, Jr. (Novato) and Máscara Dorada, Robin (Novato) and Máximo, Stigma (Novato) and La Máscara, and Taurus (Novato) and Averno compete for a place in the finals. The team of Hombre Bala Jr. and Atlantis defeated Akuma and Mephisto in the first round, followed by a victory over Taurus and Averno in the second round. In the semi-finals Atlantis faced long time adversary Último Guerrero and his Novato partner Guerrero Negro, Jr. and was able to win the latest chapter in the long running storyline between the two wrestlers, earning Hombre Bala Jr. and himself a spot in the finals. Block B saw the participation of eight additional teams; Camaleón (Novato) and Brazo de Plata, El Cholo (Novato) and Rey Bucanero, Espanto, Jr. (Novato) and Mr. Niebla, Herodes, Jr. (Novato) and El Terrible, Leono (Novato) and Blue PantherSensei (Novato) and Rush, Soberano Jr. (Novato) and La Sombra, Boby Zavala (Novato) and Rey Escorpión. Zavala and Rey Escorpión defeated Leono and Blue Panther in the first round, Espanto, Jr. and Mr. Niebla in the quarter-finals and finally Soberano Jr. and La Sombra to earn a spot in the finals of the 2013 tournament. The finals of the 2013 Gran Alternativa tournament was the only two out of three falls match in the tournament.

In the second match of the night two-thirds of the Los Reyes de la Atlantida trio, Delta and Guerrero Maya, Jr. was paired up with Ángel de Oro to take on two-thirds of Los Hijos del Averno (Ephesto and Mephisto) and El Felino. Delta and Guerrero Maya, Jr. (along with Tritón) had lost to El Felino and his two sons ( Puma and Tiger) in the opening match of the 2013 Homenaje a Dos Leyendas show, but beyond that there was no issues between the two sides. The opening match of the show would be yet another chapter in a long running rivalry between experienced tecnico Metálico and rudo El Hijo del Signo who portrays a brash, arrogant character out to prove that he is better than Metálico. The storyline began in late winter, 2013 as they began to face off in matches that saw Hijo del Signo cheat more than once to defeat the veteran Metálico. The storyline between the two was featured a number of shows throughout March and April, including a one-on-one match on CMLL's Super Viernes show, their main weekly show and an indicator that CMLL is escalating the storyline between the two. The two were on opposite sides of a match on the Arena Coliseo 70th Anniversary Show where El Hijo del Signo got disqualified for pulling Metálico's mask off during the match, a move that is prohibited under lucha libre rules. Each of the rivals were given two tag team partners for the match with no real reason or background given for Metálico to team up with Soberano Jr. and Sensei or for Hijo del Signo to team up with the Los Guerreros Tuareg team of Arkangel de la Muerte and Skándalo.

== Event ==
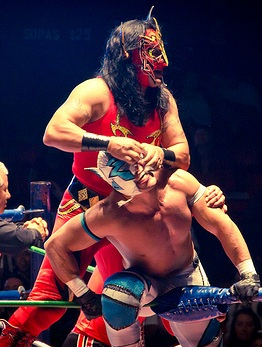
Delta (in front) wrestled in the second match of the night.

The focus of the first match of the show focused on the ongoing storyline between Metálico and El Hijo del Signo as they each led a team of three against each other. The rudo side of Hijo del Signo, Arkangel de la Muerte and Skándalo quickly won the first fall of the match. In the second fall Metálico, Sensei and Soberano Jr. came back to tie the match up between the two teams, forcing the match into a third and deciding victory. Hijo del Signo resorted to cheating to take the third and deciding fall for his side. The second match of the night was not simply about "rudo vs. tecnico" but also to some extent about "Youth vs. Experience" as the three young wrestlers Ángel de Oro, Delta and Guerrero Maya, Jr. took on the very very experienced rudo team of El Felino, Mephisto and Ephesto. In the end experience overcame youth as the veterans won the first fall as well as the third fall, finishing the match after Mephisto was able to execute a Devil's Wing move off the second rope on Delta to get the three count.

The third match of the night was one of the focal points of the show, the finals of the 16 team Gran Alternativa tournament. Rey Escorpión showed that he had taken the young rudo Boby Zavala under his wing from the moment they entered the arena, Zavala wore a Rey Escorpión T-shirt and was give his own Los Revolucionarios del Terror (Escorpión's team) Sombrero with his name on the brim of it. The match focuses mainly on the two Novatos Hombre Bala Jr. and Zavala as they worked hard to show that they had the wrestling skills to work at a higher level than they were before the tournament. The match went the full three falls. In the closing moments of the match Rey Escorpión eliminated Hombre Bala Jr. after he used his signature Aguijón Venenoso ("The Poisoned Stinger") finishing move, also known as a Package piledriver on Bala, Jr. Moments later Boby Zavala landed a splash off the ropes and pinned Atlantis to win the tournament. Following the match the rudo team were presented with trophies as a visual representation of their victory. Afterwards Escorpión touted the values of the Sonora wrestling school that he and Zavala both had trained at the beginning of their careers.

Rey Cometa was accompanied by Stuka, Jr. for his one-on-one match with Namajague, while his opponent had Okumura at ringside, bringing all four participants in the Homenaje a Dos Leyendas main event back together again. Okumura helped his partner by attacking Rey Cometa before the bell could even ring, giving Namajague the advantage for the first fall, allowing him to pin Cometa after a power bomb. Stuka, Jr. helped Cometa by keeping Okumura at bay during the second fall, even when the two wrestlers fought outside the ring. At one point Rey Cometa was able to leap off the elevated stage, landing a Moonsault assault on Namajague. Once back inside the ring Rey Cometa forced Namajague to submit to an Armbar submission hold. The third fall was the longest of the match as saw both men hold the advantage in the match at different times. After looking like he would lose Rey Cometa was able to outsmart Namajague, allowing him to land a 450° splash so he could pin him to win the match. Following the match Namajague, who had resisted removing his mask during the Dos Leyendas show, accepted the loss and knelt down as Rey Cometa began to cut his hair. After getting a few handfuls of Namajague's black and bleached hair he left the official CMLL barber finish up, shaving all of Namajague's hair off while still sitting in the center of the ring.

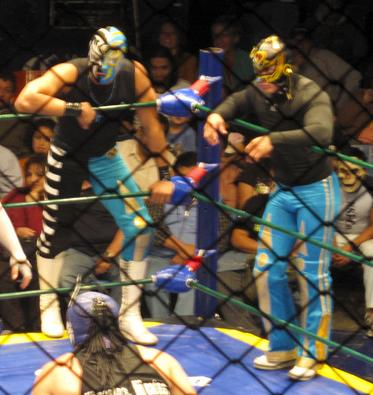
Volador Jr. and La Sombra, on opposite sides of the main event match.

The match for the vacant Mexican National Welterweight Championship was originally planned to be the main event and last match of the night, but was moved down to the fifth match instead with no official explanation given. Averno had long time tag team partner Mephisto in his corner while Místico was accompanied by La Sombra for the biggest match of his young career. Místico started out strong, showing off his high flying moves to the delight of a large part of the crowd, but ultimately the experienced Averno took the first fall after catching Místico off guard, pinning him following Averno's signature "Devil's Wings" move. In the second fall Místico managed to trap Averno in an armbar submission hold, often referred to as La Mistica II, forcing the leader of Los Hijos del Averno to submit. The third fall saw Místico control most of the match, displaying his wrestling skills and winning the approval of some of the crowd that had been hesitant to support the second Místico up until that point. The crowd boo'ed Místico when he applied La Mística, the finishing move of the original Místico to Averno. At that point in time Mephisto jumped in the ring to distract the referee and save Averno from being forced to submit. With the referee's back turned Averno landed a kick to Místico's groin and then pinned him to win the match and the championship. With the victory he became the 71st Mexican National Welterweight Champion, a division described as one of the most important divisions in Mexico.

CMLL usually tries to have their Friday night shows end by a certain time to give the fans enough time to use the public transportation in Mexico City before it shuts down for the night. Since some of the earlier matches had been longer than normal the sixth match of the night was the shortest match of the night. Volador Jr. came to the ring dressed like the Iron Patriot from the Iron Man 3 movie, continuing his tradition of wearing pop culture, especially super-hero, inspired ring gear. Rush, La Sombra and Máscara Dorada quickly won the first fall, followed by Volador Jr. El Terrible and Último Guerrero winning the second. Rush's actions in the third fall lead to one reporter stating that "Rush was a rudo trapped in the body of a tecnico", while he was on the side of the "good guys" in the match, he often used cheating tactics during the match. The third fall was cut short when Rush kicked El Terrible in the groin, drawing an immediate disqualification and a loss for his team.

== Results ==
No.	Results	Stipulations
1	El Hijo del Signo and Los Guerreros Tuareg (Arkangel de la Muerte and Skándalo) defeated Metálico, Sensei, and Soberano Jr. — two falls to one	Best two-out-of-three falls six-man Lucha Libre rules tag team match
2	Los Hijos del Averno (Ephesto and Mephisto) and El Felino defeated Ángel de Oro, Delta, and Guerrero Maya, Jr. — two falls to one	Best two-out-of-three falls six-man Lucha Libre rules tag team match
3	Boby Zavala and Rey Escorpión defeated Hombre Bala Jr. and Atlantis — two falls to one	Gran Alternativa 2013 semi-final match
4	Rey Cometa defeated Namajague — two falls to one	Best two-out-of-three falls Lucha de Apuestas, hair vs. hair match
5	Averno defeated Místico La Nueva Era — two falls to one	Best two-out-of-three falls match for the vacant Mexican National Welterweight Championship
6	Último Guerrero, Volador Jr., and El Terrible defeated Máscara Dorada, Rush, and La Sombra by disqualification — two falls to one	Best two-out-of-three falls six-man Lucha Libre rules tag team match
