= Sin Piedad (2012) =

Mexican professional wrestling supercard show

- Official poster of the event
- Promotion: Consejo Mundial de Lucha Libre
- Date: December 14, 2012
- City: Mexico City, Mexico
- Venue: Arena México

Pay-per-view chronology
← Previous; La Copa Junior	Next → Fanastica Mania

Sin Piedad chronology
← Previous; 2011	Next → 2016

Sin Piedad (2012) (Spanish for "No Mercy") was an annual professional wrestling major event produced by Consejo Mundial de Lucha Libre (CMLL), which took place on December 14, 2012 in Arena México, Mexico City, Mexico and replaced CMLL's regular Friday night show Super Viernes ("Super Friday"). The 2012 Sin Piedad was the eleventh event under that name that CMLL has promoted their last major show of the year, always held in December. The main event of the show was the finals of the 2012 2012 La Copa Junior Tournament between La Sombra and Tama Tonga, both second-generation wrestlers. The show included five additional matches and would be the first major CMLL show promoted in Mexico since, the CMLL 67th Anniversary Show on September 29, 2000, to not feature a Lucha de Apuestas or bet match at all.

== Production ==
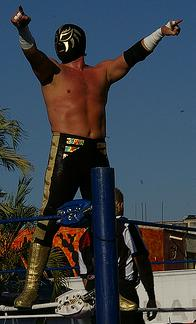
La Sombra, in the finals of the 2012 La Copa Junior tournament.

=== Background ===
The Mexican wrestling company Consejo Mundial de Lucha Libre (Spanish for "World Wrestling Council"; CMLL) has held a number of major shows over the years using the moniker Sin Piedad ("No Pity" or "No Mercy"). CMLL has intermittently held a show billed specifically as Sin Piedad since 2000, primarily using the name for their "end of the year" show in December, although once they held a Sin Piedad show in August as well. CMLL has on occasion used a different name for the end-of-year show but Sin Piedad is the most commonly used name. All Sin Piedad shows have been held in Arena México in Mexico City, Mexico which is CMLL's main venue, its "home". Traditionally CMLL holds their major events on Friday Nights, which means the Sin Piedad shows replace their regularly scheduled Super Viernes show. The 2012 Sin Piedad show was the eleventh show to use the name.

=== Storylines ===
The event featured six professional wrestling matches with different wrestlers involved in pre-existing scripted feuds, plots and storylines. Wrestlers were portrayed as either heels (referred to as rudos in Mexico, those that portray the "bad guys") or faces (técnicos in Mexico, the "good guy" characters) as they followed a series of tension-building events, which culminated in a wrestling match or series of matches.

Consejo Mundial de Lucha Libre (CMLL) started their annual 2012 La Copa Junior on their November 30, 2012 Super Viernes show, a tournament for second and third-generation wrestlers. In Block A La Sombra defeated Volador Jr., Ángel de Oro, Mephisto, La Máscara, Negro Casas, Máscara Dorada, Olímpico, Delta and Tiger to qualify for the final match at Sin Piedad. The following week's Super Viernes Show Tama Tonga won Block B's torneo cibernetico to earn a spot in the final match. Tonga defeated Shocker, Máximo, Brazo de Plata, Guerrero Maya Jr., Stuka Jr., Dragón Rojo Jr., El Felino, Misterioso Jr. and Puma to win the block. While not involved in a storyline feud with each other before the tournament La Sombra and Tama Tonga had faced off several times, including a tag team match in New Japan Pro-Wrestling (NJPW) where Tonga and Tetsuya Naitō defeated La Sombra and Karl Anderson in April, 2012 while La Sombra was touring in with NJPW. Tonga came to Mexico in October for a "learning excursion", during which Tonga and La Sombra has been on opposite sides in several matches, although they had not met in a one-on-one match before their Sin Piedad main event match.

The fourth match on the card was announced as a "Lightning Match", a match which has only one fall instead of the traditional three falls and only have a 10-minute time limit. The match between Máscara Dorada and Averno was a direct result of the main event of the December 7, 2012 Super Viernes where Dorada teamed up with Diamante Azul and Rush to defeat Los Hijos del Averno ("The Sons of Hell"; Averno, Ephesto and Mephisto) with Máscara Dorada pinning Averno in the third and deciding fall. The second match of the night, featuring CMLL's female division had rivals Estrellita and Princesa Blanca on opposite sides. The two had been building a rivalry for several months, a rivalry that saw Estrellita end Princesa Blanca's 1,793 days run holding the Mexican National Women's Championship. Both wrestlers made Luchas de Apuestas challenges after the match, verifying that the title change was not necessarily the end of their feud. The remaining matches were not created to further any specific existing storylines between the participants.

== Event ==
The opening match of the show featured CMLL's Mini-Estrellas division as the tecnico team of Astral, Bam Bam and Fantasy took on and defeated the team of Demus 3:16, Pequeño Olímpico and Pierrothito. The final fall of the match was Bam Bam leap off the top rope to strike a prone Demus 3:16 with a diving legdrop for the three count. After the match Demus 3:16 was put on a stretcher and carried from the ring, either due to Bam Bam's move itself or as a storyline to help build the illusion that the diving leg drop move was that dangerous.

== Aftermath ==
Tama Tonga only wrestled a few more matches for CMLL before returning to NJPW full time in early January 2013.

=== Reception ===
When the card was announced Súper Luchas Magazine writer Alex Ruiz Glez commented on the lack of a Luchas de Apuestas match for either masks or hair on the show. He stated that the Sin Piedad show was "usually more attractive" but did note that the La Copa Junior match and the "Lightning Match" could be good, but also noted that the card appeared to be "No big deal", especially compared to the rival Guerra de Titanes show promoted by Mexican wrestling promotion AAA. After the show Mexican Sports News website MedioTiempo commented that the main event was Tama Tonga's best match in Mexico and that La Sombra looked spectacular.

== Results ==
No.	Results	Stipulations	Times
1	Astral, Bam Bam and Fantasy defeated Demus 3:16, Pequeño Olímpico and Pierrothito	Best two-out-of-three falls six-man "Lucha Libre rules" tag team match	—
2	La Amapola and Las Ladies de Polanco (Princesa Blanca and Princesa Sujey) defeated Dark Angel, Estrellita and Silueta	Best two-out-of-three falls six-man "Lucha Libre rules" tag team match	—
3	Titán, Tritón and Valiente defeated La Peste Negra (El Felino and Negro Casas) and Puma	Best two-out-of-three falls six-man "Lucha Libre rules" tag team match	—
4	Averno defeated Máscara Dorada	Lightning match (One fall, 10-minute time-limit match)	—
5	El Terrible, Último Guerrero and Volador Jr. defeated Diamante Azul, Rush and Shocker	Best two-out-of-three falls six-man "Lucha Libre rules" tag team match	—
6	La Sombra (with Rush) defeated Tama Tonga (with El Terrible)	Singles match for the 2012 La Copa Junior Tournament Final	17:51
