= CMLL Super Viernes (December 2012) =

Mexican professional wrestling show series

In December 2012, the Mexican professional wrestling promotion Consejo Mundial de Lucha Libre (CMLL) held four CMLL Super Viernes shows, all of which took place in Arena México on Friday nights. Some of the matches from Super Viernes were taped for CMLL's weekly shows that aired in Mexico the week following the Super Viernes show. The shows featured various professional wrestling matches with different wrestlers involved in pre-existing scripted feuds or storylines. Wrestlers portrayed either villains (referred to as "rudos" in Mexico) or fan favorites ("technicos" in Mexico) as they followed a series of tension-building events, which culminated in a wrestling match or series of matches.

== December 7, 2012 ==
CMLL Super Viernes
- Poster promoting the match between La Sombra and Último Guerrero as Las Joyas de la Corona ("The Crown Jewels")
- Promotion: Consejo Mundial de Lucha Libre (CMLL)
- Date: December 7, 2012
- City: Mexico City, Mexico
- Venue: Arena México
- Tagline(s): Un Lucha con Causa ("Wrestling for a cause")

Event chronology
← Previous; Super Viernes November 30, 2012	Next → Sin Piedad (2012)

CMLL Super Viernes chronology
← Previous; Super Viernes November 30, 2012	Next → Super Viernes December 21, 2012

Consejo Mundial de Lucha Libre's (CMLL) December 7, 2012, Super Viernes show was originally promoted as Noches Britanica ("British Night") and was to be copromoted by the British Embassy in Mexico City. The event was set to include musical performances by British Musicians, a red double decker bus and a number of Buckingham palace guards. The event was nicknamed Un Lucha con Causa ("Wrestling for a cause") and was supported by John Langdon Down foundation for Down's syndrome research On December 6, 2012 the British Embassy announced that they, along with the John Langdon Down foundation were pulling their support for the "British Night" event, due to CMLL being unwilling to provide the foundation with a specific percentage of the ticket sales.

The show featured the second block of the 2012 2012 La Copa Junior Tournament, which included ten second-generation wrestlers. CMLL announced that one of the featured matches, originally promoted under the tagline Las Joyas de la Corona (Spanish for "The Crown Jewels"), would be a singles match between La Sombra and Último Guerrero with no time limit. The winner of the match still received a trophy even after the "British Night" aspects were abandoned, but there was no mention of the Las Joyas de la Corona name, nor the actual reason for why the trophy was awarded. The main event of the show was Diamante Azul and Rush teaming up with Máscara Dorada in their first match back from their tour of Japan. The team faced off against Los Hijos del Averno (Averno, Ephesto and Mephisto).

Family relationship
Wrestler	Family	Relationship
Brazo de Plata	Shadito Cruz	Father
Dragón Rojo, Jr.	Dragón Rojo	Storyline Grandfather
El Felino	Pepe Casas	Father
Guerrero Maya, Jr.	Guerrero Maya	Father
Máximo	Brazo de Plata	Father
Misterioso, Jr.	Misterioso	Uncle
Puma	El Felino	Father
Shocker	Rubén Soria	Father
Stuka, Jr.	Stuka I	Brother
Tama Tonga	Haku	Father

=== Event ===
In the opening match, the storyline feud between Los Hombres del Camoflaje (Artillero and Súper Comando) and Metálico continued. Metálico was teamed up with Sensei for the night and the makeshift tecnico team defeated the rudos Los Hombres in the first fall. Los Hombres came back throughout the second fall, ending with a double submission hold on their opponents to take the second fall. During the third fall Metálico tried on several occasions to team Super Comando's mask apart, underlying his frustrations with the opposing team. Artillero was the first man eliminate from the match when he was pinned by Metálico, but he snuck back into the ring and landed a low kick on Metálico while the referee was not watching. The foul allowed Super Comando to pin Metálico, winning the match for his team. After several weeks where members of Los Guerreros Tuareg (The Tuareg Warriors) had teamed up with members of Los Cancerberos del Infierno (The Cerberus of Hell) and failed to get along. On December 7 Los Guerreros had shown that if they were allowed to work as a group, in this instance Arkangel de la Muerte, Hooligan and Skándalo, they were able to work as a unit, defeating the tecnico team of Starman, Super Halcón Jr. and Pegasso when Skándalo pinned Pegasso in the third fall. The match was originally announced with Ángel Azteca, Jr. as part of the tecnico team, but when CMLL updated their posters to remove any reference to "British Night" he was replaced with Pegasso without any explanation given. In the third match of the night the Japanese team of La Fievre Amarilla ("The Yellow Fever"; Okumura and Namajague) teamed up with Sangre Azteca to take on the tecnico trio of El Hijo del Fantasma, Rey Cometa and Tritón. The teamwork of La Fievre led them to take the first fall over the makeshift tecnico team. The high flying, fast paced offense of Hijo del Fantasma, Rey Cometa and Tritón overwhelmed their opponents as they won both the second and third fall. In the final fall Hijo del Fantasma pinned team captain Okumura.

The fourth match of the night was a 10-man torneo cibernetico match with the survivor qualifying for the finals of the 2012 La Copa Junior. The match pitted 5 tecnicos (Shocker, Máximo, Brazo de Plata, Guerrero Maya, Jr. and Stuka, Jr.) against 5 rudos (Dragón Rojo, Jr., El Felino, Misterioso, Jr., Puma and Tama Tonga). Misterioso, Jr. was the first man eliminated after four minutes and twenty seconds. About four minutes later the father son team of El Felino and Puma worked together to eliminate Brazo de Plata. The third elimination saw Dragón Rojo, Jr. pinned Stuka, Jr. twelve minutes and 42 seconds into the match. The teams alternated in eliminations as Shocker pinned Puma, Tama Tonga pinned Guerrero Maya, Jr. and Maximo pinned Felino. With just four wrestlers left in the ring, Maximo and Dragón Rojo, Jr. fighting to a double disqualification, which meant they were both eliminated at the same time. The match came down to Shocker and Tama Tonga, who went one-on-one for six and a half minutes before Tonga was able to overcome his opponent to win the match. Due to his victory, Tama Tonga faced La Sombra the following week as part of the 2012 Sin Piedad event.

The fifth match of the night was originally promoted under the tagline Las Joyas de la Corona ("The Crown Jewels"), tying into the "British Night" theme. When the John Langdon Down and the British Embassy pulled out of the event the match tagline was quietly abandoned even though the match still took place. The match between two of CMLL's top names, the rudo Último Guerrero and the tecnico La Sombra, was a single fall match with no time limit. The match, described as a "Modern classic" by one source, began with mat work by both wrestlers, exchanging holds and counters. A few minutes in Guerrero started to take shortcuts, punishing La Sombra with a number of illegal actions, which led to La Sombra to start using his high-flying, high-speed offensive to regain the momentum of the match. While Guerrero tried to ground La Sombra throughout the match La Sombra was able to win the match after executing not one, but two Moonsaults in succession to take the victory. Following the match La Sombra was still awarded a trophy, referred to as a "Commemorative trophy". The main event match was the first Super Viernes match for Diamante Azul and Rush following their tour of Japan where they participated in New Japan Pro-Wrestling's 2012 World Tag League. Upon their return the duo teamed up with fellow tecnico Máscara Dorada to take on the rudo trio known as Los Hijos del Averno ("The Sons of Hell") composed of Averno, Ephesto and Mephisto. The two teams split the first two falls between them, leading the third and final fall. During the third fall most of the action centered around Máscara Dorada and Averno, with Dorada pinning Averno to win the match for his team.

=== Results ===
No.	Results	Stipulations	Times
1	Los Hombres del Camoflaje (Artillero and Súper Comando) defeated Metálico and Sensei	Best two out of three falls Tag team match	—
2	Los Guerreros Tuareg (Arkangel de la Muerte, Hooligan and Skándalo) defeated Starman, Super Halcón Jr. and Pegasso	Six-man tag team match	—
3	El Hijo del Fantasma, Rey Cometa and Tritón defeated La Fievre Amarilla (Okumura and Namajague) and Sangre Azteca	Six-man tag team match	—
4	Tama Tonga defeated Shocker, Máximo, Brazo de Plata, Guerrero Maya, Jr., Stuka, Jr., Dragón Rojo, Jr., El Felino, Misterioso, Jr. and Puma	2012 La Copa Junior Tournament Block B torneo cibernetico	26:50
5	La Sombra defeated Último Guerrero	Singles match for a "Commemorative Trophy"	—
6	Diamante Azul, Máscara Dorada and Rush defeated Los Hijos del Averno (Averno, Ephesto and Mephisto)	Six-man tag team match	—

== December 14, 2012 ==
On December 14, 2012, CMLL replaced their regular Super Viernes show with their 2012 Sin Piedad annual event.

== December 21, 2012 ==
CMLL Super Viernes
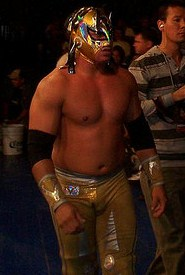
- Volador Jr., on the winning side in the main event.
- Promotion: Consejo Mundial de Lucha Libre (CMLL)
- Date: December 21, 2012
- City: Mexico City, Mexico
- Venue: Arena México

Event chronology
← Previous; Sin Piedad (2012)	Next → Super Viernes December 28, 2012

CMLL Super Viernes chronology
← Previous; Super Viernes December 7, 2012	Next → Super Viernes December 28, 2012

The focal point of the December 21, 2014 Super Viernes show, Mexican professional wrestling promotion Consejo Mundial de Lucha Libre (CMLL) main weekly show, was the continuation of the Los Invasores storyline they had been building since mid-2010 when a group of "Outsiders" invaded CMLL. By the end of 2012 Invasores members Mr. Águila, Psicosis and Volador Jr. had won the Mexican National Trios Championship from Los Reyes de la Atlantida (Atlantis, Delta and Guerrero Maya, Jr.) only five days prior to the Super Viernes show. The main event of the show pitted the Mexican National Trios Champions against two-thirds of the then reigning CMLL World Trios Champions El Bufete del Amor ("The Law of Love") as Marco Corleone and Máximo teamed up with Diamante Azul instead of their regular trios partner La Máscara. After El Bufete lost Los Invasores challenged them to a title match, but the request was denied. Instead the two championship trios would face off at the Following week's Super Viernes instead. On the undercard a long running storyline between the CMLL Arena Coliseo Tag Team Champions Stuka, Jr. and Fuego (Collectively known as Los Bombardieros; "The Bombardiers") and the team known as La Fiebre Amarilla ("The Yellow Fever"; Namajague and Okumura) as the two teams faced off in a Six-woman "Lucha Libre rules" tag team match. Los Bombardiers teamed up with Rey Cometa, while La Fievre Amarilla teamed up with Vangelis to defeat the champions and Rey Cometa furthering the storyline between the two teams, as well as the rivalry the Namajague and Okumura was building with Rey Cometa.

=== Results ===
No.	Results	Stipulations	Times
1	Hombre Bala Jr. and Super Halcón Jr. defeated Los Hombres del Camoflaje (Artillero and Super Comando)	Best two out of three falls Tag team match	—
2	La Amapola, Princesa Sujei and Tiffany defeated Dalys la Caribeña, Estrellita and La Silueta	Six-man tag team match	—
3	La Fiebre Amarilla (Namajague and Okumura) and Vangelis defeated Rey Cometa and Los Bombardieros (Fuego and Stuka Jr.)	Six-man tag team match	—
4	Averno defeated Valiente	Lightning match (One fall, 10 minute time-limit match)	05:59
5	Blue Panther, La Sombra and Titán defeated Negro Casas and La Fuerza TRT (El Terrible and Tiger)	Six-man tag team match	—
6	Los Invasores (Mr. Águila, Psicosis and Volador Jr.) defeated Diamante Azul, Marco Corleone and Máximo	Six-man tag team match	—

== December 28, 2012 ==
CMLL Super Viernes
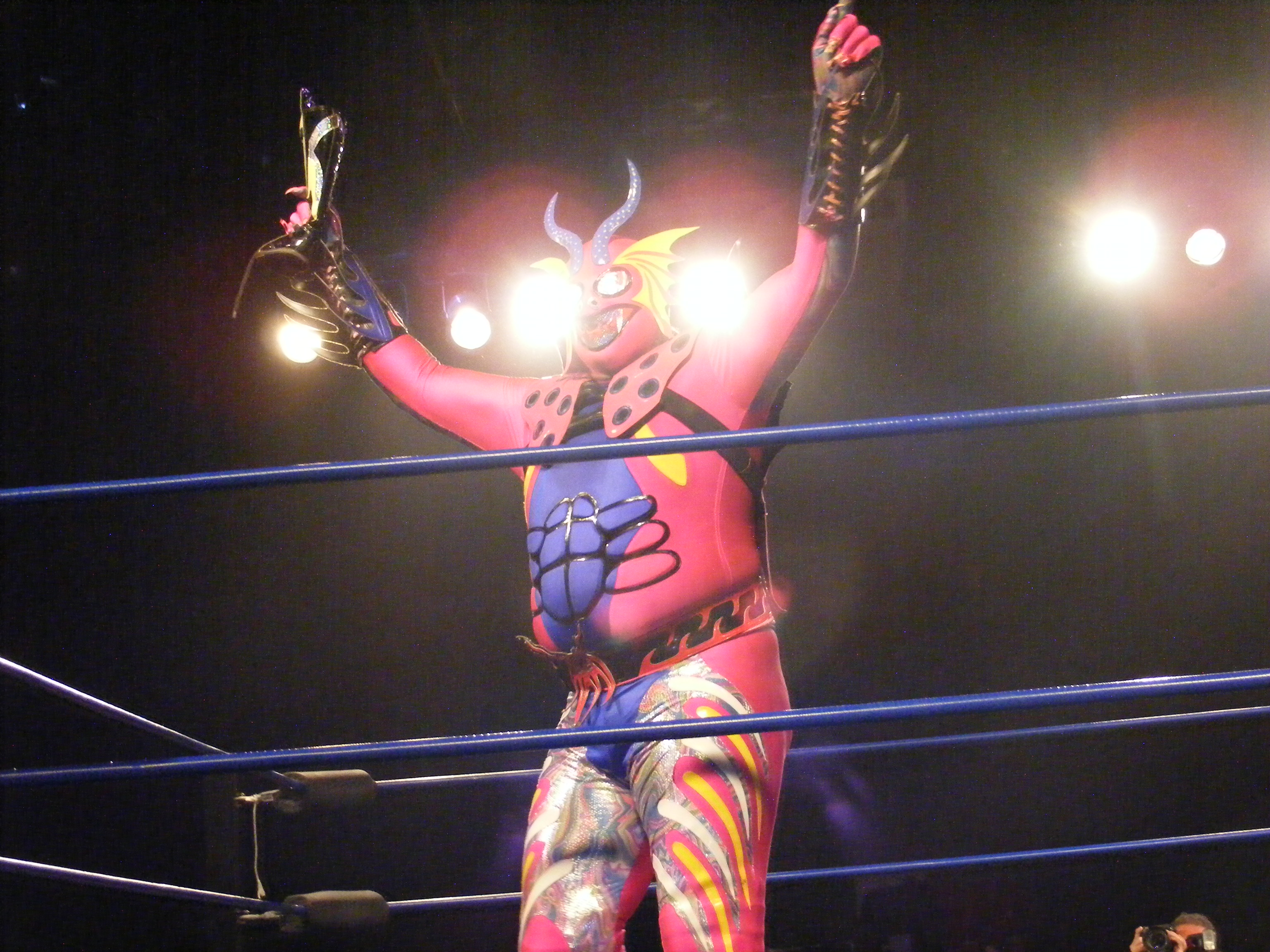
- Kraneo, on the winning side of the main event.
- Promotion: Consejo Mundial de Lucha Libre (CMLL)
- Date: December 28, 2012
- City: Mexico City, Mexico
- Venue: Arena México

CMLL Super Viernes chronology
← Previous; Super Viernes December 21, 2012	Next → Super Viernes January 4, 2013

Mexican professional wrestling promotion Consejo Mundial de Lucha Libre (CMLL) held their December 28 Super Viernes show in Arena México, with a six-match show. Oftentimes CMLL shows between Christman and New Year do not feature a lot of storyline development, but in this case CMLL used the main event to further a storyline between their CMLL World Trios Champions El Bufete del Amor ((La Máscara, Marco Corleone and Máximo)) and their Mexican National Trios Champions Los Invasores (Kraneo, Psicosis and Volador Jr.) as the two teams faced off in the main event in a non-title match. Los Invasores won the match and would eventually get a chance to win both championships in 2013, but did not become double champions at the time. The show also had a minute of applause for Emilio Charles Jr., a long time CMLL wrestler who died earlier in the day. On the undercard Rey Cometa and Fuego furthered their storyline with the Japanese duo known as La Fiebre Amarilla ("The Yellow Fever"; Namajague and Okumura). That storyline would eventually become the main event of the 2013 Homenaje a Dos Leyendas as Rey Cometa and Stuka, Jr. faced La Fiebre Amarilla in a Luchas de apuestas, or bet match where each team put their wrestling mask and hair on the line. On December 28 Fuego and Rey Cometa teamed up with Tritón to defeat La Fiebre Amarilla and Vangelis two falls to one.

=== Results ===
No.	Results	Stipulations
1	Molotov and Stigma defeated Akuma and Inquisidor	Best two out of three falls Tag team match
2	Dalys la Caribeña, Estrellita and Luna Mágica defeated La Amapola, La Comandante and Princesa Sujei	Six-man tag team match
3	Fuego, Rey Cometa and Tritón defeated La Fiebre Amarilla (Namajague and Okumura) and Vangelis	Six-man tag team match
4	Mr. Águila defeated Valiente	Lightning match (One fall, 10 minute time-limit match)
5	El Felino and Los Hijos del Averno (Averno and Mephisto defeated Los Reyes de la Atlantida (Atlantis, Delta and Guerrero Maya Jr.)	Six-man tag team match
6	Los Invasores (Kraneo, Psicosis and Volador Jr.) defeated El Bufete del Amor (La Máscara, Marco Corleone and Máximo)	Six-man tag team match
