= Homenaje a Dos Leyendas (2013) =

Mexican professional wrestling supercard show

- Official poster of the 2013 event
- Promotion: Consejo Mundial de Lucha Libre
- Date: March 15, 2013
- City: Mexico City, Mexico
- Venue: Arena México
- Attendance: 14,000

Pay-per-view chronology
← Previous; Torneo Sangre Nueva	Next → Torneo Increibles de Parejas, Arena Puebla

Homenaje a Dos Leyendas chronology
← Previous; 2012	Next → 2014

Homenaje a Dos Leyendas (2013) (Spanish for "Homage to Two Legends") was a professional wrestling supercard show event, scripted and produced by Consejo Mundial de Lucha Libre (CMLL; "World Wrestling Council"). The Dos Leyendas show took place on March 15, 2013 in CMLL's main venue, Arena México, Mexico City, Mexico. The event was to honor and remember CMLL founder Salvador Lutteroth, who died in March 1987. Starting in 1999 CMLL honored not just their founder during the show, but also a second lucha libre legend, making it their version of a Hall of Fame event. For the 2013 show CMLL commemorated the life and career of wrestler and lucha film star Rayo de Jalisco Sr. This was the 15th March show held under the Homenaje a Dos Leyendas name, having previously been known as Homenaje a Salvador Lutteroth from 1996 to 1998.

The main event was a tag team Lucha de Apuestas, or bet match, where each team "bet" their mask or hair on the outcome of the match. The team of Stuka Jr. (betting his mask) and Rey Cometa (betting his hair) defeated La Fiebre Amarilla ("The Yellow Fever"), forcing Okumura to have his hair cut off, and Namajague to unmask and reveal his real name, Kyosuke Mikami. One of the featured matches of the undercard was a second lucha de apuestas matchwhere the Mexican National Women's Champion Estrellita defeated La Amapola, forcing Amapola to be shaved bald as a result. In the finals of the 2013 CMLL Torneo Nacional de Parejas Increibles La Sombra and Volador Jr. defeated Atlantis and Último Guerrero to win the tournament. The show also included a match with longtime rivals Rayo de Jalisco Jr. and Universo 2000 in addition to two further matches.

== Production ==
=== Background ===
Since 1996 the Mexican wrestling company Consejo Mundial de Lucha Libre (Spanish for "World Wrestling Council"; CMLL) has held a show in March each year to commemorate the passing of CMLL founder Salvador Lutteroth who died in March 1987. For the first three years the show paid homage to Lutteroth himself, from 1999 through 2004 the show paid homage to Lutteroth and El Santo, Mexico's most famous wrestler ever and from 2005 forward the show has paid homage to Lutteroth and a different leyenda ("Legend") each year, celebrating the career and accomplishments of past CMLL stars. Originally billed as Homenaje a Salvador Lutteroth, it has been held under the Homenaje a Dos Leyendas ("Homage to two legends") since 1999 and is the only show outside of CMLL's Anniversary shows that CMLL has presented every year since its inception. All Homenaje a Dos Leyendas shows have been held in Arena México in Mexico City, Mexico, which is CMLL's main venue, its "home". Traditionally CMLL holds their major events on Friday Nights, which means the Homenaje a Dos Leyendas shows replace their regularly scheduled Super Viernes show. The 2013 show was the 18th overall Homenaje a Dos Leyendas show.

=== Storylines ===
The Homenaje a Dos Leyendas show featured six professional wrestling matches with different wrestlers involved in pre-existing scripted feuds, plots and storylines. Wrestlers were portrayed as either heels (referred to as rudos in Mexico, those that portray the "bad guys") or faces (técnicos in Mexico, the "good guy" characters) as they followed a series of tension-building events, which culminated in a wrestling match or series of matches.

The main event for the 2013 Dos Leyenda show was a direct result of a long-running slowly building storyline between the Japanese duo of Namajague and Okumura, collectively known as La Fiebre Amarilla ("The Yellow Fever") and Mexican high-fliers Stuka Jr. and Rey Cometa. Namajague, the masked identity of New Japan Pro-Wrestling (NJPW) rookie Kyosuke Mikami, made his debut in CMLL a few weeks prior to the 2012 Homenaje a Dos Leyendas show as part of CMLL's working arrangement with NJPW. He was immediately teamed up with Okumura, CMLL's resident Japanese wrestler who often acts both as a tag team partner, mentor, and translator for Japanese wrestlers touring with CMLL. In the year since Namajague's debut La Fievre Amarilla had several unsuccessful title matches against Stuka Jr. and Fuego for the latter's CMLL Arena Coliseo Tag Team Championship. Through the series of Arena Coliseo Tag Team matches Namajague began targeting Stuka Jr. specifically, more intent on hurting and humiliating him including tearing Stuka Jr.'s mask open during the match. In late 2012 the two began facing off on opposite sides of Six-man tag team matches on various weekly Super Viernes shows, CMLL's main weekly show. In November Stuka Jr. often teamed with Rey Cometa to take on the Japanese team and Puma King, initially as a continuation of the storyline between Rey Cometa and Puma King, who had unmasked Rey Cometa at the CMLL 79th Anniversary Show, but began to morph into focusing on the escalating issues between Stuka Jr./Rey Cometa and Fiebre Amarilla. On the November 2, 2012 Super Viernes the match started out with Rey Cometa and Puma King being the focal point of the match, but Okumura won the third and deciding fall for his team when he took advantage of a distracted referee to land an illegal low blow on Stuka Jr. A few weeks later, on the November 23 Super Viernes La Fiebre was on the opposite side of Rey Cometa once again and Namajague tried once again to win the match by illegal means, only to be caught by the referee and disqualified as a result of his actions. On the last Super Viernes of 2012 La Fiebre teamed up with Vangelis to defeat the team of Fuego, Rey Cometa and Stuka Jr. The victory earned La Fiebre another match against the CMLL Arena Coloseo Tag Team Champions. During the title match Namajague, Namajague tried to trick Stuka Jr. into getting disqualified by pulling his own mask off and throwing it to Stuka Jr. to make it look like it was pulled off, which is a disqualification offense in Lucha Libre. Stuka Jr. reacted quickly before the referee noticed and put the mask back on Namajague and then pinned his surprised opponent. The January 4, 2013 Super Viernes saw the rivalry continue as Stuka Jr. and Okumura was on opposite sides of a six-man tag team match, won by Stuka Jr.'s team, while Rey Cometa defeated Namajague by disqualification when Namajague tried to use a low blow on his opponent. Over the next several of weeks Stuka Jr. and Namajague found themselves on opposite sides of six-man tag team matches, teaming with a number of different partners which did not always include Rey Cometa or Okumura. Both Rey Cometa and Namajague took part in the 2013 CMLL Reyes del Aire ("Kings of the Air") tournament on February 2, 2013 but due to their interaction and a mistimed move Namajague ended up landing wrong during a dive to the floor and had to be taken to the hospital, while moments later Rey Cometa also ended up hurt. Both accidents looked so bad that it put their participation in the follow week's Super Viernes in question, but in the end Rey Cometa teamed with Stuka Jr. and El Hijo del Fantasma to take on and defeat Namajague, Okumura and Misterioso Jr. Following the February 8 match Stuka Jr. challenged Namajague to put his mask on the line in a Lucha de Apuesta, or bet match, an offer that Okumura "in his role as leader of Fiebre Amarilla" declined the challenge, wanting to face Stuka Jr. himself. Rey Cometa responded to that challenge by issuing a team challenge, with himself and Stuka Jr. against La Fiebre Amarilla for the team's mask and hair to be on the line. During the introductions to a six-man tag team match on February 15, 2013 Stuka Jr. and Namajague started to argue while still in the aisle to the ring, only for Stuka Jr. to be attacked from behind by another Namajague. The first Namajague was revealed as Okumura as the two beat Stuka Jr. down. The Japanese team lost the match by disqualification after unmasking Stuka Jr. in the second fall. Following the match Okumura said they accepted the tag team challenge. On Thursday February 21, 2013, CMLL held a press conference announcing, among other things, that the match between the two teams would officially take place at the 2013 Homenaje a Dos Leyendas as the main event of the show. On March 3, 2013 La Ola Amarilla defeated Stuka Jr. and Fuego to win the CMLL Arena Coliseo Tag Team Championship in a match that ended in controversy as Stuka Jr.'s shoulder was not on the mat during the count of three, something the referee did not see.

Another featured match on the 2013 Homenaje a Dos Leyendas would be the finals of the 4th annual Torneo Nacional de Parejas Increibles ("National Incredible Pairs Tournament") that started with a qualifying block on the March 1st Super Viernes, followed by a second qualifying block on the March 8th Super Viernes show. The tournament is based on the Lucha Libre Parejas Increibles match type where two wrestlers of opposite allegiance, portraying either villains, referred to as "Rudos" in Lucha Libre wrestling terminology or fan favorites, or "tecnicos". At times some of the team members were part of a pre-existing scripted feuds or storylines with each other. In previous years the winning team has been given a trophy and general recognition while the storyline tension between one or more of the other teams has led to main event matches on major CMLL shows later in the year. The team of La Sombra and Volador Jr., former teammates and holders of the CMLL World Tag Team Championship, turned enemies defeated the team of Mr. Niebla and Shocker in the Block A semi-finals to earn a spot in the finals of the tournament. Block B saw the odds on favorite team of rivals Atlantis and Último Guerrero qualify for the finals by defeating the teams of Valiente and Pólvora, and Diamante Azul and Euforia in the preliminary rounds and then defeated the team of Dragón Rojo Jr. and Niebla Roja to earn a spot in the finals. Despite being involved in a long running storyline between the two they worked together without problems, harking back to the time where both wrestlers were part of Los Guerreros de la Atlantida ("The Warriors of Atlantis") The 2013 Torneo Nacional de Parejas Increibles would feature two teams that used to team up on a regular basis but had since then developed long running, heated rivalries.

On February 21, 2013, CMLL held a press conference to officially announce that the Homena a Dos Leyendas would pay tribute to Rayo de Jalisco ("The Lighting from Jalisco") and brought out Rayo's son, Rayo de Jalisco Jr., as part of the announcement. Rayo de Jalisco Jr. had not worked for CMLL since 2010 but made a special appearance due to the company honoring his father. During the press conference Rayo de Jalisco Jr.'s long time rival Universo 2000 interrupted Rayo de Jalisco Jr. and the two ended up challenging each other to a match that would take place at the 2013 Homenaje a Dos Leyendas, although the exact nature of the match was not announced at the time. The rivalry between the two wrestlers hailed back to at least 1997 where Universo 2000 defeated both Cien Caras and Rayo de Jalisco Jr. to win the CMLL World Heavyweight Championship. Universo 2000 defended the title three times during his reign: against Brazo de Plata, Máscara Sagrada, and Rayo de Jalisco Jr., before losing the championship to Rayo de Jalisco Jr. on September 13, 1998. Universo 2000 regained the title on December 10, 1999 Universo 2000's second reign became a recordbreaking reign in several areas, it was the longest to date as it lasted 1,225 days. He also became the champion with most successful title defenses in one reign including eight defenses against Rayo de Jalisco Jr. during their long running rivalry. After being masked since his debut in 1985 Universo 2000 lost a Lucha de Apuesta match to El Canek in the main event of the 71st Anniversary Show, on September 17, 2004, the match also included Rayo de Jalisco Jr. and Dr. Wagner Jr. and originally came about due to the Universo 2000/Rayo de Jalisco Jr. rivalry. Following his unmasking Universo 2000 won the 2004 Leyenda de Azul (Blue legend tournament). In subsequent years both Universo 2000 and Rayo de Jalisco Jr. left CMLL. In 2005 Rayo de Jalisco Jr. suffered another serious injury, he injured both his knees in a match against Universo 2000's brother Máscara Año 2000, where his legs got caught on the ropes as he jumped out of the ring and he tore ligaments in both knees. The injury kept him out of the ring for almost half a year but in the end Rayo de Jalisco Jr. was able to make a full recovery and return to the ring. The incident was used by several promoters as well as Rayo de Jalisco Jr. himself to create more interest in matches between himself and Universo 2000, Cien Caras and Máscara Año 2000. Rayo de Jalisco Jr. made his return to CMLL in May, 2010, siding with the CMLL loyalists in their feud with Los Invasores, especially Invasore members Universo 2000 and Máscara Año 2000, reigniting the long running storyline between them. But Rayo, Universo and Cien Caras only worked a select few dates for CMLL before leaving again. The official match between the long time rivals saw each team up with participants of the 2013 Torneo Parejas Increibles, only in this case they were on opposite sides instead of teaming up. Rayo de Jalisco Jr. would team up with Shocker and Rush while Universo 2000 would team up with Shocker's rival Mr. Niebla and Rush's rival El Terrible. Shocker and Mr. Niebla had a long backstory between then, having actually worked together as a regular tag team in the late 1990s. In 1998 the two defeated Dr. Wagner Jr. and Emilio Charles Jr. to win the CMLL World Tag Team Championship and would subsequently defend the tag team championship against teams such as Blue Panther and Black Warrior, Bestia Salvaje and Scorpio Jr. and the Hermanas Dinamita (Cien Caras and Universo 2000). In October, 1998 Mr. Niebla suffered an injury during a match, an injury that was so severe that Mr. Niebla was forced to vacate the Tag Team title. Upon his return Mr. Niebla continued to team with Shocker but the team were not able to win the Tag Team title back. On September 24, 1999, at the CMLL 66th Anniversary Show, the team of Nr. Niebla and Shocker faced Atlantis and Villano III in a Relevos suicida match, a match where the losing team would fight each other for their mask. In the main event match of CMLL's 66th Anniversary show, Atlantis and Villano III defeated the much less experienced team, afterwards Mr. Niebla defeated Shocker to unmask him. In the years since Shocker's unmasking the two have wrestled each other on numerous occasions, both in CMLL and other promotions. The two teamed up for the Parejas Increibles tournament and made it to the semi-final but lost to La Sombra and Volador Jr. when the tension between the two became a distraction in the match. The rivalry between Rush and El Terrible started when El Terrible defeated Rush in the finals of a tournament to determine a holder of the CMLL World Heavyweight Championship on January 1, 2012. The two were also paired up for the 2012 Torneo Nacional de Parejas Increibles, and in the weeks leading up to the tournament Rush stated that he was willing to set aside his differences with El Terrible as he wanted to win the Parejas Increibles tournament, despite the two having developed a heated rivalry over the last number of months. After getting along and qualifying for the final match Rush and El Terrible's miscommunication and dissension allowed their opponents to win the match and the tournament. Following the match Rush took a microphone and berated both El Terrible and the fans for their actions that night and then followed it up by challenging El Terrible to a Luchas de Apuestas, hair vs. hair match at a later date. El Terrible did not accept the challenge at that point in time. The two faced off in the main event of the CMLL 79th Anniversary Show in a Lucha de Apuestas, hair vs. hair match that was won by Rush. The storyline continued to develop in the months following the anniversary event and included El Terrible successfully defending the CMLL World Heavyweight Championship against Rush on January 22, 2013. The two rivals were simply unable to get along from the beginning, causing them to be eliminated in the first round of the Parejas Increibles tournament by Dragón Rojo Jr. and Niebla Roja.

The second Luchas de Apuestas match announced for the 2013 Homenaje a Dos Leyendas show would see two wrestlers from CMLL's female division both put their hair on the line in a one-on-one match between Estrellita and La Amapola. For years La Amapola had been the top ranked female wrestler in CMLL, including a record long run with the CMLL World Women's Championship. Before 2010 Estrellita worked for 10 years for CMLL's main Mexican rival AAA, but in September 2010 Estrellita appeared in CMLL as part of a group called Los Invasores, former AAA wrestlers playing off a storyline that they were "invading" CMLL. This marked the first time that Estrellita worked as ruda (Bad guy character). She made her first appearance at a major CMLL show when she teamed up with Tiffany and Mima Shimoda only to lose to Dark Angel, Luna Mágica and Marcela as part of the 2010 Sin Piedad show. A few months later she would split from Los Invasores as she had a falling out with Tiffany and returned to her tecnica ways. In the fall of 2012 Amapola and Estrellita began facing off more and more as part of six-man tag team matches, often with La Amapola attacking Estrellita before or after the match, targeting the "outsider" repeatedly. Estrellita defeated Princesa Blanca to win the Mexican National Women's Championship, CMLL's secondary female title, which made her a bigger target for La Amapola. In the weeks leading up to the announcement of the Luchas de Apuestas match Estrellita had made several challenges to her rival, trying to get La Amapola to put her hair on the line against Estrellita. Each time La Amapola refused, citing that she would not risk her hair unless she got a match for the Mexican Nation Women's Championship in return. The Championship match was not mentioned when the hair vs. hair match was announced for Homenaje a Dos Leyendas. In the days leading up to the event Estrellita stated during an interview that she had often been criticized for her wrestling skills which made her work harder and seek out the hardest opponents to beat and that win or lose she hoped her efforts in the match would silence some of these critics.

The second match of the night saw long time rivals as captains of opposite teams as La Máscara teams with Máscara Dorada and Valiente and Averno leads the rest of his group Los Hijos del Averno ("The Sons of Hell"; Mephisto and Ephesto) against each other. The rivalry between the two dates back to early 2011 when the two began a long running, very high-profile storyline feud between the two. The highlight of the storyline came at the 2011 Juicio Final show where La Máscara defeated Averno in a Luchas de Apuestas match and forced Averno to unmask as a result. The two clashed on multiple occasions after the mask match, with the tension being evident in almost all matches. The two were teamed up for both the 2012 and the 2013 Torneo Nacional de Parejas Increibles tournaments. During the 2012 tournament the team only coexisted long enough to defeat the team of Valiente and Olímpico in the first round, but the dissension between the two cost them their second-round match to eventual tournament winners Atlantis and Mr. Niebla. In the 2013 tournament the duo defeated El Hijo de Fantasma and El Felino in the first round, but lost to La Sombra and Volador Jr. in the second round. Máscara Dorada and Mephisto had also teamed up for the 2013 Torneo Nacional de Parejas Increibles, not so much out of any existing storyline reasons as perhaps more to develop a rivalry between the two. They defeated Máximo and Mr. Águila in the first round, but were defeated by Shocker and Mr. Niebla in the second round of the tournament. The first match of the show featured a rare teaming of the father/sons team of El Felino teaming with Puma and Tiger, something that had only happened on rare occasions and never at a major CMLL event before. The Casas family (Felino and sons) would face off against two thirds of Los Reyes de la Atlantida ("The Kings of Atlantis") Delta and Guerrero Maya Jr., teaming up with Tritón for a match that had no real storyline behind it.

=== Homage to Salvador Lutteroth and Rayo de Jalisco ===
In September 1933 Salvador Lutteroth González founded Empresa Mexicana de Lucha Libre (EMLL), which would later be renamed Consejo Mundial de Lucha Libre. Over time Lutteroth would become responsible for building both Arena Coliseo in Mexico City and Arena Mexico, which became known as "The Cathedral of Lucha Libre". Over time EMLL became the oldest wrestling promotion in the world, with 2018 marking the 85th year of its existence. Lutteroth has often been credited with being the "father of Lucha Libre", introducing the concept of masked wrestlers to Mexico as well as the Luchas de Apuestas match. Lutteroth died on September 5, 1987. EMLL, late CMLL, remained under the ownership and control of the Lutteroth family as first Salvador's son Chavo Lutteroth and later his grandson Paco Alonso took over ownership of the company.

In 2013 CMLL decided that their Homenaje a Dos Leyendas show would pay tribute to Máximino "Max" Linares Moreno, better known to the wrestling world as Rayo de Jalisco Rayo de Jalisco's wrestling career spanned 49 years, from 1950 until his retirement in 1989, shortly after losing a high-profile Luchas de Apuestas to Blue Demon and was forced to unmask. Over the years he formed highly successful duos with both Blue Demon and El Santo, Rayo and El Santo won the Mexican National Tag Team Championship on two occasions. He also won the NWA World Middleweight Championship three times and the Occidente Welterweight Championship. Linares, as Rayo de Jalisco, also starred in a number of Lucha films in the early 1970s including, Superzam el Invencible ("Superzam the invincible"), El Robo de las Momias de Guanajuato ("The Robbery of the Mummies of Guanajuato"), Vuelven Los Campeones Justicieros ("Becoming the Champions of Justice") and El Triunfo de los Campeones Justicieros ("The Triump of the Champions of Justice"). In 1996, he was inducted into the Wrestling Observer Hall of Fame. Linares' son made his professional wrestling debut in 1975 and has worked for most of his career as Rayo de Jalisco Jr. and is still an active wrestler. His grandson currently wrestles under the ring name Rayman, after at one point working as "El Hijo de Rayo de Jalisco Jr." ("The Son of Rayo de Jalisco Jr."). Rayo de Jalisco Jr. had worked for CMLL as recent as 2010,

== Event ==
The Dos Leyendas show featured a new entrance set up by CMLL, featuring three large video screens and separate staircases for the rudos and tecnicos to come down during their introductions. The crowd was estimated to be over 14,000 spectators in total, which was a significant improvement compared to the attendance of the Super Viernes shows of the previous weeks, which had drawn less than half those numbers. In the opening match La Dinastía Casas ("The Casas Dynasty") of El Felino and his sons Puma and Tiger shows their team unity with their black and white ring gear as well as Puma and Tiger both wearing masks that combined their own mask design with that of their brother. While the team of Delta, Guerrero Maya Jr. and Tritón came ready to fight El Felino was fired up and motivated by teaming with his sons, which showed in his performance in the match. Puma and Tiger had been at odds at times before the show, but there was no signs of dissension during the match as La Dinastía Casas won both the second and third fall, taking the final fall with Tiger and Puma pinning their opponents. The second match clearly demonstrated that Los Hijos del Averno (Averno, Mephisto and Ephesto) work as a well functioning team due to their many years of experience from teaming together, the three managed to win the first fall over La Máscara, Máscara Dorada and Valiente in convincing fashion, so much so that the Arena Mexico crowd were cheering for the team despite them being the rudos in the match. During the second fall the high flying moves and skills of Máscara Dorada was the only time the crowd would cheer for the tecnico side, supporting them as they won the second fall. In the third and deciding fall Averno got the pinfall victory for his team, giving Los Hijos del Averno a very appreciated victory.

Just as in the previous match, the Arena Mexico crowd was decidedly "pro rudo" for the first Luchas de Apuestas match, supporting La Amapola as she faced off against "La Más Bonita" Estrellita in the third match of the night. Throughout most of the match the crowd chanted for La Amapola and booed when Estrellita was in control of the match. Estrellita was seconded by La Máscara for this important match while La Amapola had Ephesto in her corner for the night, neither corner man was based on any existing, ongoing storylines. Estrellita won the first fall in quick fashion when she used the La Casita cradle hold to get the three count. In the second fall La Fleur Lethal, as La Amapola is also known, got the upper hand and quickly evened the score between the two. The third fall was longer, more drawn out than the first two falls combined and saw La Amapola almost win on more than one occasion. In the end Estrellit trapped her opponent in an armbar submission hold and managed to keep La Amapola away from the ring ropes. With no way of escaping La Amapola reluctantly gave up and lost the third fall and thus the match. A visibly infuriated La Amapola stood in the center of the ring as all of her long blond hair was shaved off as per the match stipulation, she even grabbed the clippers and did part of the shaving herself. After the haircut Estrellita displayed La Amapola's hair, celebrating a victory that seemed to not be popular with the Arena Mexico crowd but was expected.

CMLL held their tribute to Rayo de Jalisco and Salvador Lutteroth after the ring was cleared from the Luchas de Apuetas match. Rayo de Jalisco Sr. came to the ring wearing his trademark lightingbolt mask and was accompanied by his son as well as Atlantis and Máscara Dorada for the ceremony. The fans showed their appreciation of the lucha libre legend by giving him a standing ovation as he was presented with a plaque commemorating the event. Atlantis and Máscara Dorada escorted the almost 80-year-old Rayo de Jalisco to the back while Rayo Jr. remained in the right for the fourth match of the night. Rayo Jr.'s partner Rush was introduced to the crowd, but before they could bring out Shocker Universo 2000 came through the crowd and attacked Rayo de Jalisco Jr. from behind. Moments later Shocker, Mr. Niebla and El Terrible all rushed to the ring and the opening portion of the match was chaos with all six wrestlers in the ring at the same time. The brawl saw the wrestlers pair off with their natural rivals, Shocker and Mr. Niebla, Rush and El Terrible and Rayo de Jalisco Jr. and Universo 2000. The rudo team took advantage of the confusion and cheated their way into winning the first fall. During the second fall Universo 2000 made a mistake, giving Rayo de Jalisco Jr. the opportunity to tie the match up at one fall each. During the third and final fall the 53-year-old Rayo de Jalisco Jr. actually leap off the top rope onto Universo 2000 on the floor. The third fall ended without a decisive victory as Universo 2000 decided to land a foul, low kick on Rayo de Jalisco Jr. drawing a disqualification from the referee.

Both sets of finalists for the 2013 Torneo Nacional de Parejas Increibles had stated that they were willing to set aside their rivalry for at least one night to win the tournament, a sentiment that the former "Super Sky Team" of La Sombra and Volador Jr. demonstrated by wearing similar right gear to the ring. They both wore black masks, shirts and tights with white markings reminiscent of the "skeleton" image used by Volador Jr.'s uncle L.A. Park and Volador Jr.'s father Super Parka. Despite statements that they would get along the team of Atlantis and Último Guerrero had some problems during the first fall causing them to lose to La Sombra and Volador Jr. With the second fall being their last change the former Los Guerreros de la Atlantida began to work together more, relying on their many years of experience as a team, winning the second fall when they both applied Atlantis' Atlantida, a spinning backbreaker rack, to the former Super Sky Team to gain a submission victory in the second fall. The third fall proved to be the tipping point between Atlantis and Último Guerrero while La Sombra and Volador Jr. managed to set aside their personal differences for one night. The third and final fall was won by Volador Jr. and La Sombra when La Sombra pinned Atlantis after a top rope Asai Moonsault. While the winners celebrated Atlantis and Guerrero argued and almost fought before being separated by CMLL officials. After the match both wrestlers made challenges for the other to put their mask on the line at a future date, before settling on the shorter term with a singles match between the two for the follow week's CMLL Super Viernes show, proposed as a match with no referee and thus no disqualification.

The main event match between the Mexican team and the Japanese La Fiebre Amarilla started out with the tecnico side showing a bit of unity as Stuka Jr. wore a mask that was a combination of his own and the mask style Rey Cometa had worn until September, 2012. Namajague also wore a mask created specifically for the occasion, featuring long, bright red hair attached to his mask. Okumura and Namajague sought to get an easy advantage by jumping their opponents before the bell, but based on the two teams previous history Stuka Jr. and Rey Cometa were prepared for it and took control of the match for the early parts of the match. After several minutes of being on the defensive La Fievre Amarilla double teamed their way into control of the match and won the first fall of the match. The rudo duo continued to dominate throughout most of the second fall, but this time the Mexican team was able to overcome this and even the match with one fall to each team. Initially the crowd was quiet for the match, but by the end of the second fall the Mexico City fans were solidly cheering "Mexico" to support the home team. At one point a mistake between Stuka Jr. and Rey Cometa saw the team almost fight each other, each thinking the other one intentionally knocked them down. After a few moments cooler heads prevailed and Stuka Jr. and Rey Cometa turned their attention back towards their Japanese rivals for the third and final fall. In the third fall Stuka Jr. pinned Okumura to eliminate him from the match, while he himself being pinned by Namajague only moments later. This left Namajague and Rey Cometa in the ring, with the next elimination deciding which side lost the match. After several moments of high flying, fast-paced wrestling Rey Cometa was able to execute a 450 degree splash off the top rope to Namajague for the final elimination. The crowd showed their appreciation for the performance of both Mexicans, cheering them on as brightly colored confetti dropped from the ceiling covering the defeated Okumura and Namajague. While Stuka Jr. and Rey Cometa celebrated Okumura had all his hair shaved off while sitting in the middle of the ring, paying off on the "bet" he placed on the match. Subsequently, Namajague removed his wrestling mask to show the audience his face and announced that his name was Kyosuke Mikami, 29 years old and five years as a professional wrestler to close the show.

== Aftermath ==
The main event was not the end of the storyline between Rey Cometa and Namajague as they continued to clash in the weeks after the Dos Leyendas show, including one match where Namajague attacked Rey Cometa with a pane of glass, breaking it over Cometa's head. Stuka Jr. and Okumura only played a very small part in the storyline as the two agreed to a one-on-one Lucha de Apuestas at the Arena Mexico 57th Anniversary Show where both men would put their hair on the line.

Backstage after the show Atlantis challenged Último Guerrero to name the date and he would put his mask on the line against Guerrero in a Luchas de Apuestas. The challenges between Atlantis and Último Guerrero led to them being booked in the main event of the March 22, 2013 CMLL Super Viernes show, albeit in a regular one-on-one match and not the "No disqualification" match that Atlantis suggested after their tournament loss. In the weeks following the show CMLL held a press conference where the two wrestlers signed a contract for a Lucha de Apuestas between the two with both men putting their masks on the line. No official date was given for the match but there was speculation that it would take place at the CMLL 80th Anniversary Show in October 2013. The two rivals found themselves on opposite sides in the semi-finals of the 2013 Gran Alternativa tournament. The tournament saw Atlantis team up with rookie Hombre Bala Jr. while Último Guerrero teamed up with Guerrero Negro Jr. After both teams won their first two matches the semi-finals saw Atlantis and Hombre Bala Jr. defeat the two Guerreros to earn a spot in the finals of the tournament. In the week following his tournament victory Atlantis was quoted as saying that "Último Guerrero would look good in my trophy case".

The truce between La Sombra and Volador Jr. that allowed them to win the tag team tournament only lasted until the next time the two rivals were in the same ring. On Sunday February 17, 2013, La Sombra teamed up with Marco Corleone and Místico La Nueva Era against Volador Jr. Euforia and Último Guerrero. During the match Volador Jr. attacked both La Sombra and the referee, causing a disqualification before leaving the ring and his confused partners behind.

== Reception ==
Prior to the show Alez Ruiz Glez, writer for the Mexican SuperLuchas Magazine stated that the show looked very attractive and he would expect good matches, especially the Apuesta matches. The Cub's Fan of the Luchablog website was surprised to see the tag team Luchas de Apuestas match as the main event since it was usually featured in the second or third match of the shows leading up to Homenaje a Dos Leyendas.

=== Results ===
No.	Results	Stipulations
1	La Dinastía Casas (El Felino, Puma and Tiger) defeated Delta, Guerrero Maya Jr. and Tritón	Best two-out-of-three falls six-man "Lucha Libre rules" tag team match
2	Los Hijos del Averno (Averno, Mephisto and Ephesto) defeated La Máscara, Máscara Dorada and Valiente	Best two-out-of-three falls six-man "Lucha Libre rules" tag team match
3	Estrellita defeated La Amapola	Best two-out-of-three falls Lucha de Apuesta hair vs. hair match
4	Rayo de Jalisco Jr., Shocker and Rush defeated Universo 2000, Mr. Niebla and El Terrible by disqualification	Best two-out-of-three falls six-man "Lucha Libre rules" tag team match
5	La Sombra and Volador Jr. defeated Atlantis and Último Guerrero	Best two-out-of-three falls tag team match. Finals of the 2013 Torneo Nacional de Parejas Increibles
6	Rey Cometa and Stuka Jr. defeated La Fiebre Amarilla (Okumura and Namajague)	Best two-out-of-three falls tag team Lucha de Apuestas mask and hair vs. mask and hair match.
