= CMLL Super Viernes (November 2012) =

In November 2012 the Mexican professional wrestling promotion Consejo Mundial de Lucha Libre (CMLL) held five CMLL Super Viernes shows, all of which took place in Arena México on Friday nights. Some of the matches from Super Viernes were taped for CMLL's weekly shows that aired in Mexico the week following the Super Viernes show. The shows featured various professional wrestling matches, often with different wrestlers involved in pre-existing scripted feuds or storylines. Wrestlers portrayed either villains (referred to as "rudos" in Mexico) or fan favorites ("tecnicos" in Mexico) as they followed a series of tension-building events, which culminate in a wrestling match or series of matches. Being professional wrestling events matches are not won legitimately; they are instead won via predetermined outcomes to the matches that is kept secret from the general public.

== November 2, 2012 ==
CMLL Super Viernes
- Promotion: Consejo Mundial de Lucha Libre (CMLL)
- Date: November 2, 2012
- City: Mexico City, Mexico
- Venue: Arena México

CMLL Super Viernes chronology
← Previous; Super Viernes October 26, 2012	Next → Super Viernes November 9, 2012

Consejo Mundial de Lucha Libre's (CMLL) November 2, 2012 Super Viernes show featured six matches wrestling matches in total. The main event was the first singles match between rivals Rey Escorpión and Último Guerrero, escalating the storyline conflict that has been building for close to a year. The "Lightning" Match was scheduled to be Starman and Skándalo face off only one week after Skándalo stole Starman's mask during a match, but Starman was replaced with Delta. The show was CMLL's Dia de los Muertos celebration.

=== Event ===
The November 2nd show coincided with the Mexican celebration of the Dia de los Muertos ("Day of the dead"), which led some wrestlers to paint their faces in the traditional Dia de los Muertos style as white skulls, including Leono in the opening match. Leono teamed up with Soberano Jr. facing the team of Apocalipsis and Inquisidor to start the Super Viernes show with a Tag Team that most of the Super Viernes shows starts with. The end came when Inquisidor and Apocalipsis used underhanded tactics to cheat their way to a victory over their young opponents. In the second match Los Ladies de Polanco (Princesa Blanca and Princesa Sujei) commemorated Dia de los Muertos by dressing up as Catrinas, including skull paint, long black dresses and veiled hats as part of their introductions. Los Ladies teamed up with La Comandante to take on the team of Dark Angel, Estrellita and Luna Magica. This match was Estrellita's first Super Viernes match back after recovering from an injury. The returning Estrellita won the first match for her team, but ultimately lost the match for her team as she was pinned by La Comandante in the third and final fall of the match.

The "Lightning Match" was originally planned to have Skándalo face off against Starman, continuing a storyline from the previous week where Skándalo ripped off Starman's mask and stole it. The plans were changed on Tuesday night when Starman was replaced by Delta, no explanation for the change was given, nor was Starman injured. Skándalo was accompanied by the Los Guerreros Tuareg valet Isis for the match. In the end Delta was able to execute his signature Delta Especial move (A Moonsault) and defeat Skándalo seven minutes and twenty seconds into the match. The fourth match of the evening was a best two out of three falls Six-man tag team match between the tecnico (wrestlers who portray the "good guys") team of Ángel de Oro, Blue Panther and Titán and the rudo ("Bad guy") team of Averno, Mephisto and Pólvora. The two teams split the first two falls between them in quick succession, then in the third fall Averno began targeting Titán in his attacks, making sure that the veteran rudo punished the young up-and-coming tecnico throughout the match. In the end Averno pulled Titán's mask off in view of the referee, causing his team to be disqualified. After the match Averno taunted his now mask-less opponent, furthering the budding rivalry between the two. New Japan Pro-Wrestling (NJPW) representative Tama Tonga continued his learning excursion in the semi-main event as he teamed up with two members of La Fuerza TRT, El Terrible and Tiger to face the tecnico team of Atlantis, Rush and La Sombra. After the first two falls were split 1-1 the two teams went into the third and longest fall of the match, with no clear dominant faction. In the end Tama Tonga got the victory for his team, two falls to one.

=== Main Event ===
The storyline dispute between Último Guerrero and Rey Escorpión that led to that week's main event was very evident even before the match actually started. Guerrero entered the ring first, then attacked Rey Escorpión while he was still on the floor, before the bell rang. Guerrero dove out of the ring and knocked Escorpión down, not once but three times in a row, inflicting enough damage that Rey Escorpión was not able to get inside the ring before the referee counted to 20, giving Último Guerrero the first fall by count out. Once Escorpión recovered he was able to fight back in the second round, he fought back against Guerrero, even going so far as to tearing at Guerrero's mask using his teeth. Escorpión gained a measure of revenge on Guerrero when he applied Último Guerrero's own Pulpo Guerrero ("The Guerrero Octopus") to Guerrero and forced him to submit, tying the match at one fall each. During the third fall Rey Escorpión team mate Dragón Rojo, Jr. came to ringside to distract the referee. Escorpión tried to take advantage of the distraction to land a foul kick on Guerrero, only for Guerrero to block the move and then land a foul kick on Escorpión instead while the referee was still distracted. The underhanded tactics paid off as Guerrero took the third and deciding fall in a very heated main event. Following the match both parties made verbal threats to each other over the house microphones, indicating that the issues between the two factions were far from settled.

=== Results ===
No.	Results	Stipulations	Times
1	Apocalipsis and Inquisidor defeated Soberano Jr. and Leono	Best two out of three falls Tag team match	—
2	Los Ladies de Polanco (Princesa Blanca and Princesa Sujei) and La Comandante defeated Dark Angel, Estrellita and Luna Magica	Six-man tag team match	—
3	Delta defeated Skándalo	Lightning match (One fall, 10 minute time-limit match)	07:20
4	Ángel de Oro, Blue Panther and Titán defeated Los Hijos del Averno (Averno and Mephisto) and Pólvora by disqualification	Six-man tag team match	—
5	Tama Tonga and La Fuerza TRT (El Terrible and Tiger) defeated Atlantis, Rush and La Sombra	Six-man tag team match	—
6	Último Guerrero defeated Rey Escorpión	Best two-out-of-three falls match	—

== November 9, 2012 ==
CMLL Super Viernes
- Promotion: Consejo Mundial de Lucha Libre (CMLL)
- Date: November 9, 2012
- City: Mexico City, Mexico
- Venue: Arena México

CMLL Super Viernes chronology
← Previous; Super Viernes November 2, 2012	Next → Super Viernes November 16, 2012

Consejo Mundial de Lucha Libre's (CMLL) November 9, 2012 Super Viernes show featured six matches wrestling matches in total. The main event saw CMLL World Trios Champion El Bufete del Amor ("The Law of Love") Marco Corleone, Rush and Maximo facing Volador Jr., El Terrible and Último Guerrero in a non-title match. The show featured five additional matches. One of the storylines going into the show centered around Titán and Averno who will be on opposite sides in the semi-main event. The storyline between the two started the previous week after Averno humiliated Titán by unmasking him in the middle of a match.

=== Event ===
In the opening match second generation luchador Stigma. with his chest painted to resemble The Incredible Hulk, teamed up with the Distrito Federal Welterweight Championship Sensei to take on the rudo ("Bad guys") team of Bobby Zavala and Cholo. Stigma got the third and deciding fall for his team, in what was described as a "memorable" performance. The second match of the night was originally booked to have Mini-Estrella Astral team up Fantasy and Último Dragóncito, but on the prior Tuesday Astral got badly hurt during an Infierno en el Ring Steel cage match. Astral was the sixth person to exit the cage when he tried to perform a Moonsault of the top of the cage onto Mercurio, Aéreo and Fantasy who were on the floor. Due to the cage mesh breaking earlier in the match, Astral got caught up on the cage and landed awkwardly on the three men on the floor. The bad fall caused Astral to be rushed out of the arena for immediate attention and Mercurio had to be carried to the back as well due to the impact of Astral. Due to the injuries sustained he was replaced by Acero. The rudo team, Demus 3:16, Pequeño Olímpico and Pierrothito, had all suffered various injuries during the same match but seemed to be okay on Friday night. The rudo trio consisted of the reigning CMLL World Mini-Estrella Champion (Olímpico), the reigning Mexican National Lightweight Champion (Pierrothito) and one of the most experienced Mini-Estrellas in the division, an advantage that was evident as the team won both the first and the last fall of the match, taking the last fall by submission as Pierrothito forced Dragoncito to give up. The Lightning Match (10 minute time limit and only one fall as opposed to the traditional three fall matches CMLL prefers) featured the experienced rudo Sangre Azteca take on the high flying Fuego, who was one half of the CMLL Arena Coliseo Tag Team Championship team with Stuka, Jr. Neither wrestler dominated the match, but Sangre Azteca took the victory in five minutes, thirty seconds when he countered Fuego's move off the top rope with a dropkick followed by a pinfall. CMLL introduced Puma King as simply "Puma" during the fourth match, which may or may not be an indicator of a permanent name change. Puma teamed up with La Fievre Amarilla ("Yellow fever"), the team of Okumura and Namajague to take on Rey Cometa, Stuka, Jr. and Tritón. The match served as a continuation of the storyline between Puma and Rey Cometa, that had already seen Puma win a match to unmask Rey Cometa at the CMLL 79th Anniversary Show. The two kept the intensity up with Rey Cometa pinning Puma to win the first fall and Puma pinning Rey Cometa to win the second fall. In the third fall Okumura took advantage of a distracted referee to land an illegal low blow on Stuka, Jr. to get the third fall for his team The fifth match centered around the developing rivalry between experienced rudo Averno and the up-and-coming tecnico Titán that had started the previous week. For this match Averno teamed up with Niebla Roja and Pólvora while Titán was joined by Guerrero Maya, Jr. and La Sombra. The focus lay solidly on the feud between Averno and Titán throughout the match, especially as Averno began to tear at Titán's mask, ripping it open. Averno's team took the first fall, then Averno himself pinned Titán after he applied his signature "Devil's Wings" move (a Spinning lifting sitout double underhook facebuster). Following the match Averno challenged Titán to defend his Mexican National Welterweight Championship against Averno the following week, a challenge Titán accepted.

=== Main Event ===
In the main event CMLL World Trios Champions El Bufete del Amor (Spanish for "The Law of Love") Marco Corleone, Rush and Maximo, showed their team unity by wearing same colored American football jerseys as they came to the ring. The opposing team saw El Terrible and Último Guerrero team up with enmascarado ("Masked wrestler") Volador Jr., who for the night wore a mask and full body suit resembling a Na'vi from the Avatar movie The rudo team of El Terrible, Volador Jr. and Último Guerrero took the first fall, while El Bufete won the second fall. In the third and final fall El Terrible forced Marco Corleone to submit to a Half Boston Crab.

=== Results ===
No.	Results	Stipulations	Times
1	Stigma and Sensei defeated Bobby Zavala and Cholo	Best two out of three falls Tag team match	—
2	Demus 3:16, Pequeño Olímpico and Pierrothito defeated Acero, Fantasy and Último Dragóncito	Six-man tag team match	—
3	Sangre Azteca defeated Fuego	Lightning match (One fall, 10 minute time-limit match)	05:30
4	La Fievre Amarilla (Okumura and Namajague) and Puma King defeated Rey Cometa, Stuka Jr. and Tritón	Six-man tag team match	—
5	Averno, Niebla Roja and Pólvora defeated Guerrero Maya Jr., La Sombra and Titán	Six-man tag team match	—
6	Volador Jr., El Terrible and Último Guerrero defeated El Bufete del Amor Marco Corleone, Rush and Maximo	Six-man tag team match	—

== November 16, 2012 ==
CMLL Super Viernes
- Promotion: Consejo Mundial de Lucha Libre (CMLL)
- Date: November 16, 2012
- City: Mexico City, Mexico
- Venue: Arena México

CMLL Super Viernes chronology
← Previous; Super Viernes November 9, 2012	Next → Super Viernes November 23, 2012

Consejo Mundial de Lucha Libre's (CMLL) November 16, 2012 Super Viernes show featured six matches wrestling matches in total. The main event was the group known as Los Guerreros del Infierno (Spanish for "The Infernal Warriors") led by Último Guerrero as well as Euforia and Niebla Roja. Los Guerreros faced off against three of CMLL's top tecnicos ("Good guys") Atlantis, La Sombra and Diamante Azul. In the semi-main event Titán defended the Mexican National Welterweight Championship against Averno as a continuation of a storyline feud that started two weeks prior. The show included four additional matches, but not one that featured CMLL's Mini-Estrella or Female divisions.

=== Event ===
The opening match for the November 16, 2012 Super Viernes was a tag team match contested under "best two-out-of-three falls" and saw the rudo (wrestlers who portray the "bad guys") team of Camorra and Disturbio take on tecnicos ("Good guys") Bengala and third generation wrestler Robin (son of Brazo de Plata and grandson of Shadito Cruz). In the third and final fall Disturbio and Camorra applied a double submission hold on their opponents to force both of them to give up. The rudo groups known as Los Guerreros Tuareg and Los Cancerberos del Infierno had had an on-again, off-again storyline rivalry going since the formation of Los Cancerberos in late 2009. On the night for this Super Viernes show Guerrero Tuareg Hooligan teamed up with Los Cancerberos members Raziel and Virus to take on the team of Hombre Bala Jr., Pegasso and Super Halcón Jr. During the match Hooligan made a mistaken that led to Pegasso being in the perfect position to force Virus to submit to win the match for his team in the third fall. Following the loss Raziel and Virus attacked their partner Hooligan, beating him up and tearing the top half of Hooligan's mask off as a result. The third match of the night was a one-fall match with a 10-minute time limit, called a "Lightning Match" and saw Rudo Mephisto wrestle against tecnico Diamante who had participated in a series of "Lightning" matches throughout November. In the end the larger and more experienced Mephisto won the man, pinning Diamante after he was able to execute the Demon Driller (Double underhook facebuster), Mephisto's finishing move, off the second rope of the ring. The fourth match of the night was originally scheduled to have Diamante Azul participate, but when the participants were introduced La Mascara took his place, with no explanation given at the time. La Mascara teamed up with Rush and Shocker to take on the team of La Peste Negra (El Felino and Negro Casas) and Volador Jr. Volador Jr. started the first fall off right for his team when he was able to perform an Ataque Depredador ("Predator attack"; Double knee backbreaker) on La Mascara before pinning him. Moments later Negro Casas forced Rush to submit to ensure their team took the first fall of the match. The tecnico team managed to even the score minutes later, tying the match at one fall each. During the third fall the rudo Mascotas got involved in the match, with Volador Jr. tossing his Mascota Mije onto Rush, and moments later La Peste Negras Mascota Zacarias the Parrot execute a Tiger feint kick to the head of Rush as well. The tecnico team was able to turn the tables on their opponents, allowing their own Mascota KeMonito to beat up Zacarias. In the end miscommunication between Volador Jr. and his partners allowed Shocker to escape a submission hold and then apply his trademark La Reienera (Modified spinning backbreaker rack) to Negro Casas to win the match for his team.

=== Mexican National Welterweight Championship ===
The fifth match of the night had Titán defend his Mexican National Welterweight Championship against challenger Averno following several weeks of Averno humiliating the champion during Best two out of three falls Six-man tag team matches. Averno had Mephisto in his corner for this important match while Titán had Super Halcón Jr. as his corner man for the match. The experienced Averno dominated most of the first fall, winning it after using his Devil's Wings (Spinning lifting sitout double underhook facebuster), finishing move to put the champion at a disadvantage. The second fall saw Titán skills to defeat Averno, pushing the match to a third and deciding fall. The third fall saw both wrestlers fight outside the ring, including Titán throwing Averno off the ramp to the floor and moments later Averno throw Titán into the steel barricade surrounding the ring. The impact against the steel was so severe that doctors came to ringside to examine Titán's shoulder. Moments later he was allowed to continue to wrestle, but did not use the arm much during the rest of the match. In the end Titán was able to overcome a Devil's Wings off the top rope, and then managed to apply the Tirabuzon (Spanish for "Corkscrew", an Abdominal stretch) that forced Averno to submit for the third and final fall. The fans showed their appreciation for the action packed entertaining match by throwing money into the ring, a tradition in Lucha Libre after a great match.

=== Main event ===
The main event revealed why Diamante Azul was replaced in the fourth match of the night as Diamante Azul took the place of Místico La Nueva Era who had injured his shoulder in the week leading up to the show. Místico was on hand to announce that he would be unable to wrestle for approximately three weeks due to the injury. Azul teamed with Atlantis and La Sombra to fight against Los Guerreros del Infierno ("The Infernal Warriors";Euforia, Niebla Roja and Último Guerrero). The match was another chapter in an ongoing storyline between Atlantis and Último Guerrero that stretched back to 2011 when Atlantis left Los Guerreros del Infierno, causing bad blood between himself and Guerrero. During the match Atlantis tried to tear Último Guerrero's mask off at several points of the match. Los Guerreros won the first fall, then lost the second one to take the match to the full three falls. In the end Atlantis forced Guerrero to submit by applying Al Atlantida (Spinning backbreaker rack) and Diamante Azul pinned Euforia after executing a high impact German Suplex.

=== Results ===
No.	Results	Stipulations	Times
1	Camorra and Disturbio defeated Bengala and Robin	Best two out of three falls Tag team match	—
2	Hombre Bala Jr., Pegasso and Super Halcón Jr. defeated Hooligan and Los Cancerberos del Infierno (Raziel and Virus)	Six-man tag team match	—
3	Mephisto defeated Diamante	Lightning match (One fall, 10 minute time-limit match)	04:50
4	La Mascara, Rush and Shocker defeated La Peste Negra (El Felino and Negro Casas) and Volador Jr.	Six-man tag team match	—
5	Titán (C) defeated Averno	Best two-out-of-three falls match for the Mexican National Welterweight Championship	—
6	Atlantis, La Sombra and Diamante Azul defeated Los Guerreros del Infierno (Euforia, Niebla Roja and Último Guerrero)	Six-man tag team match	—

== November 23, 2012 ==
CMLL Super Viernes
- Promotion: Consejo Mundial de Lucha Libre (CMLL)
- Date: November 16, 2012
- City: Mexico City, Mexico
- Venue: Arena México

CMLL Super Viernes chronology
← Previous; Super Viernes November 16, 2012	Next → Super Viernes November 30, 2012

Consejo Mundial de Lucha Libre's (CMLL) November 23, 2012 Super Viernes show featured six wrestling matches in total. In the main event the team of Atlantis, La Sombra and Shocker faced the current CMLL World Tag Team Champions El Terrible and Tama Tonga, teaming up with Terrible's La Fuerza TRT partner Tiger. The show included five additional matches, but not one that featured CMLL's Mini-Estrella or Female divisions.

=== Event ===
The opening match saw the first time teaming of third generation wrestler Soberano Jr. (son of CMLL wrestler Euforia and grandson of wrestler El Soberano) teamed up with second or third generation wrestler Stigma (his exact family relationship to CMLL booking team member Juan Manuel Mar and CMLL wrestler Skándalo has not been revealed, just that there is one.) The two tecnicos (wrestlers who portray the "good guys") take on the brother duo of Los Hombres del Camoflaje ("Men in Camouflage"; Artillero and Super Comando) in the opening match of the show. The much more experienced brothers defeated Stigma and Sobreano, Jr. in three falls. The victory came as a result of Super Comando forcing Stigma to submit to his unique "Comando Clutch" submission hold, followed by Los Hombres applying their Artilleria Pesada double team finishing move, In the second match Ángel Azteca, Jr., Pegasso and Starman teamed up to take on the team of Hijo del Signo, Hooligan and Virus. At the previous week's Super Viernes Virus and Hooligan failed to get along, going so far as to see Virus and Cancerbero attack Hooligan after the match, tearing his mask apart. The distention continued in this match, as the tecnico team won both the first and the second fall straight out. Following the match Hooligan attacked Virus, including throwing Virus hard against the steel guardrail, ending the attack by tearing Virus' Los Cancerberos del Infierno tights apart. In the third fall high flying tecnicosÁngel de Oro, El Hijo del Fantasma and Rey Cometa took on the rudo (Bad guy) team of La Fievre Amarilla ("The Yellow Fever") team of Japanese wrestlers Okumura and Namajague, teaming up with Mexican Misterioso, Jr. Ángel de Oro won the first fall for his team when he forced Okumura to submit after applying a La Mecedora (Modified Campana) hold. The rudo team came back and won the second fall, pushing the match to its full three falls. During the third fall the tecnico team showed off their high flying skills, successfully performing several dives out of the ring to their opponents on the floor. The third fall ended in a disqualification for La Fievre Amarilla and Misterioso, Jr. when Namajague landed a foul kick on Rey Cometa, which the referee caught and disqualified him for.

The fourth match of the night was a "Lightning Match", a match with a 10-minute time limit and just one fall instead of the traditional three falls. tecnico Máscara Dorada faced off against Mr. Águila who came to the ring with his face painted to resemble a tiger. The two wrestled what was described as a "sensational" match, focusing on the high flying offense of both competitors. In the end Mr. Águila was able to execute his "Destroyer" finishing move (Front flip piledriver) to take the victory in eight minutes and two seconds. In the semi-final match two thirds of the CMLL World Tag Team Champions El Bufete del Amor (Marco Corleone and Maximo) teamed up with Maximo's father Brazo de Plata. Brazo de Plata replaced their regular partner Rush who at the time was in Japan competing in New Japan Pro-Wrestling's 2012 World Tag League tournament. The trio took on the rudo team known as Los Hijos del Averno ("The sons of Hell"; Averno, Mephisto and Ephesto). During the match Brazo de Plata showed off the fact that his massive weight loss led him to be more athletic, including performing high speed Arm drags on his opponents. The tecnico team took the third fall when Brazo de Plata dove off the second rope, splashing both Ephesto and Mephisto to get the double pinfall. In the main event former CMLL World Tag Team Champion Atlantis teamed up with La Sombra and Shocker to face the team that defeated Atlantis and Diamante Azul to win the titles El Terrible and Tama Tonga and Terrible's La Fuerza TRT team mate Tiger. During the match the high flying La Sombra and Tiger had several heated exchanges, counters and high flying moves to the enjoyment of the audience. The rudos focused most of their attention on Atlantis, including trying to tear his mask apart, as well as double teaming him throughout the match. The third fall went to Atlantis' team when he forced Tiger to submit while Shocker pinned Tama Tonga at the same time.

=== Results ===
No.	Results	Stipulations
1	Los Hombres del Camoflaje (Artillero and Super Comando) defeated Stigma and Soberano Jr.	Best two out of three falls Tag team match
2	Ángel Azteca Jr., Pegasso and Starman defeated Hijo del Signo, Hooligan and Virus	Six-man tag team match
3	Ángel de Oro, El Hijo del Fantasma and Rey Cometa defeated La Fievre Amarilla (Okumura and Namajague) and Misterioso, Jr. by disqualification	Six-man tag team match
4	Mr. Águila defeated Máscara Dorada	Lightning match (One fall, 10 minute time-limit match)
5	Marco Corleone, Brazo de Plata and Maximo defeated Los Hijos del Averno (Averno, Mephisto and Ephesto)	Six-man tag team match
6	Atlantis, La Sombra and Shocker defeated La Fuerza TRT (Tiger and El Terrible) and Tama Tonga	Six-man tag team match

== November 30, 2012 ==
CMLL Super Viernes
- Promotion: Consejo Mundial de Lucha Libre (CMLL)
- Date: November 30, 2012
- City: Mexico City, Mexico
- Venue: Arena México

CMLL Super Viernes chronology
← Previous; Super Viernes November 23, 2012	Next → Super Viernes December 7, 2012

Consejo Mundial de Lucha Libre's (CMLL) November 30, 2012 Super Viernes show featured the first block of the 2012 2012 La Copa Junior Tournament, which included ten second generation wrestlers. Block A included a seeding Battle Royal and 9 singles matches, which meant that there was a total 14 matches on the show.

Family relationship

Wrestler	Family	Relationship
Ángel de Oro	Apolo Chávez	Father
Negro Casas	Pepe Casas	Father
Delta	Trueno	Father
La Máscara	Brazo de Plata	Father
Máscara Dorada	Gitano	Father
Mephisto	Astro Rey	Father
Olímpico	Roy Aguirre	Father
La Sombra	Brillante	Father
Tiger	El Felino	Father
Volador Jr.	Volador / Super Parka	Father

=== Results ===
No.	Results	Stipulations
1	Apocalipsis and Inquisidor defeated Leono and Robin	Best two out of three falls Tag team match
2	Metálico, Super Halcón Jr. and Tigre Blanco defeated Los Hombres del Camoflaje (Artillero and Súper Comando) and Taurus by disqualification	Six-man tag team match
3	Diamante, Rey Cometa and El Sagrado defeated Puma, Sangre Azteca and Vangelis	Six-man tag team match
4	La Sombra defeated Volador Jr., Ángel de Oro, Mephisto, La Máscara, Negro Casas, Máscara Dorada, Olímpico, Delta, Tiger	2012 La Copa Junior Tournament Block A torneo cibernetico
5	Averno, Dragón Rojo, Jr. and Rey Escorpión defeated Atlantis, Shocker and Titán	Six-man tag team match
