= CMLL 79th Anniversary Show =

Mexican Professional wrestling show

- Official poster for the event
- Promotion: Consejo Mundial de Lucha Libre (CMLL)
- Date: September 14, 2012
- City: Mexico City, Mexico
- Venue: Arena México
- Attendance: 11,500
- Tagline(s): El Juicio Final (The Final Judgement)

Event chronology
← Previous; Universal Championship	Next → Leyenda de Azul

CMLL Anniversary Shows chronology
← Previous; CMLL 78th Anniversary Show	Next → CMLL 80th Anniversary Show

Juicio Final chronology
← Previous; 2011	Next → 2014

The CMLL 79th Anniversary Show (Spanish: 79. Aniversario de CMLL) was a professional wrestling event produced by Consejo Mundial de Lucha Libre (CMLL) that took place on September 14, 2012, in CMLL's home arena Arena México in Mexico City, Mexico. The event commemorated the 79th anniversary of CMLL, the oldest professional wrestling promotion in the world. The Anniversary show is normally CMLL's biggest show of the year, their Super Bowl event. The CMLL Anniversary Show series is the longest-running annual professional wrestling show, starting in 1934.

The 79th Anniversary show was also billed as Juicio Final, or "Final Justice"/"Doomsday", a title that CMLL has used at times either as a tag line for the tag line for an Anniversary show or as the name of a separate super show produced by CMLL marketed as CMLL Juicio Final. The show replaced CMLL's regular Friday night Super Viernes ("Super Friday") shows and was taped for later broadcast. This was the thirteenth time that CMLL used the name "Jucio Final" to promote one of their major shows and the first time it was used for an anniversary show.

The main event of the show was a Lucha de Apuestas, or "bet match", where both El Terrible and Rush put their hair on the line, with the loser being shaved completely bald after the match. The show also featured an additional Lucha de Apuestas match on the undercard, this time with Puma King and Rey Cometa both putting their wrestling mask on the line, with the loser being forced to unmask afterward and reveal his birth name per lucha libre traditions. The show featured an additional four matches, all contested under Best two-out-of three-falls six-man tag team rules, the most prevalent match format in CMLL and most Mexican wrestling shows.

== Production ==
=== Background ===
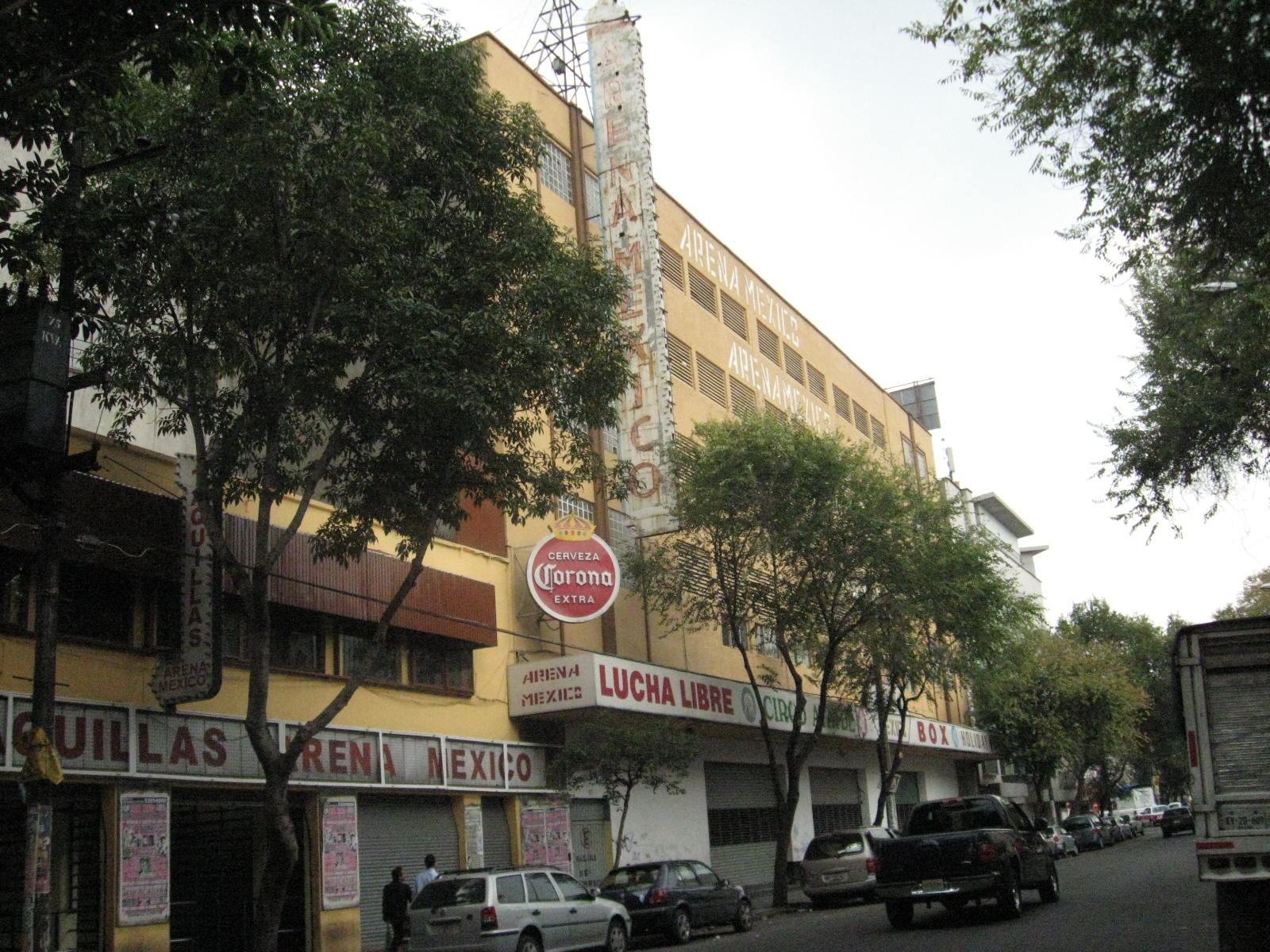
Arena México, CMLL's main venue and location of the Anniversary Show

The Mexican Lucha libre (professional wrestling) company Consejo Mundial de Lucha Libre (CMLL) started out under the name Empresa Mexicana de Lucha Libre ("Mexican Wrestling Company"; EMLL), founded by Salvador Lutteroth in 1933. Lutteroth, inspired by professional wrestling shows he had attended in Texas, decided to become a wrestling promoter and held his first show on September 21, 1933, marking what would be the beginning of organized professional wrestling in Mexico. Lutteroth would later become known as "the father of Lucha Libre" . A year later EMLL held the EMLL 1st Anniversary Show, starting the annual tradition of the Consejo Mundial de Lucha Libre Anniversary Shows that have been held each year ever since, most commonly in September.

Over the years the anniversary show would become the biggest show of the year for CMLL, akin to the Super Bowl for the National Football League (NFL) or WWE's WrestleMania event. The first anniversary show was held in Arena Modelo, which Lutteroth had bought after starting EMLL. In 1942–43 Lutteroth financed the construction of Arena Coliseo, which opened in April 1943. The EMLL 10th Anniversary Show was the first of the anniversary shows to be held in Arena Coliseo. In 1956 Lutteroth had Arena México built in the location of the original Arena Modelo, making Arena México the main venue of EMLL from that point on. Starting with the EMLL 23rd Anniversary Show, all anniversary shows except for the EMLL 46th Anniversary Show have been held in the arena that would become known as "The Cathedral of Lucha Libre". On occasion EMLL held more than one show labelled as their "Anniversary" show, such as two 33rd Anniversary Shows in 1966. Over time the anniversary show series became the oldest, longest-running annual professional wrestling show. In comparison, WWE's WrestleMania is only the fourth oldest still promoted show (CMLL's Arena Coliseo Anniversary Show and Arena México anniversary shows being second and third). EMLL was supposed to hold the EMLL 52nd Anniversary Show on September 20, 1985 but Mexico City was hit by a magnitude 8.0 earthquake. EMLL canceled the event both because of the general devastation but also over fears that Arena México might not be structurally sound after the earthquake.

When Jim Crockett Promotions was bought by Ted Turner in 1988 EMLL became the oldest still active promotion in the world. In 1991 EMLL was rebranded as "Consejo Mundial de Lucha Libre" and thus held the CMLL 59th Anniversary Show, the first under the new name, on September 18, 1992. Traditionally CMLL holds their major events on Friday Nights, replacing their regularly scheduled Super Viernes show.

=== Storylines ===
The event featured six professional wrestling matches with different wrestlers involved in pre-existing scripted feuds, plots and storylines. Wrestlers were portrayed as either heels (referred to as rudos in Mexico, those that portray the "bad guys") or faces (técnicos in Mexico, the "good guy" characters) as they followed a series of tension-building events, which culminated in a wrestling match or series of matches.

The main event of the 79th Anniversary Show was the highlight of a long running feud between the young tecnico Rush and the rudo' El Terrible that had been slowly building for almost a year leading up to the show. The first significant match between the two took place on November 13, 2011, as Rush successfully defended the CMLL World Light Heavyweight Championship against El Terrible. The following month on December 25, Rush and El Terrible were the two final survivors in a torneo cibernetico match used to determine who would fight for the vacant CMLL World Heavyweight Championship the following week. On January 1, 2012, El Terrible defeated Rush two falls to one to win the CMLL World Heavyweight Championship. In February, Rush was teamed with El Terrible in the 2012 Torneo Nacional de Parejas Increibles ("National Incredible Pairs Tournament"), a tag team tournament where all teams were made up of rivals. Rush and El Terrible eventually made it to the finals of the tournament on March 2, 2012 at Homenaje a Dos Leyendas, where they were defeated by the team of Atlantis and Mr. Niebla. Two days later, Rush successfully defended the CMLL World Light Heavyweight Championship against El Terrible. Over the summer of 2012 the feud between the two escalated until a Lucha de Apuestas, or bet match, between the two was agreed to. In the weeks before the 79th Anniversary Show held their annual 2012 Universal Championship tournament. Since both Rush and El Terrible held CMLL championships they entered the tournament and ended up facing off in the semi-finals of the tournament. El Terrible won the match over Rush, after which El Terrible and his stablemate Rey Bucanero attacked Rush. On September 9, only five days before the anniversary show, Rush defeated Rey Bucanero in a steel cage match to retain the CMLL World Light Heavyweight Championship.

== Aftermath ==
While the Lucha de Apuestas match to some extent ended the feud between the two Rush and El Terrible would cross path following El Terrible's loss. On January 15, 2013, Rush gave up the CMLL World Light Heavyweight Championship to get another shot at El Terrible's CMLL World Heavyweight Championship. Ultimately he failed to win the championship from El Terrible, after being hit with a kick to the groin. In March, Rush and El Terrible teamed up for the 2013 Torneo Nacional de Parejas Increibles like they had for the 2012 tournament, but the team lost in the first round to Dragón Rojo Jr. and Niebla Roja. Two weeks later they were on opposite sides of a six-man tag team match at the 2013 Homenaje a Dos Leyendas show, where Rush, Rayo de Jalisco Jr. and Shocker defeated El Terrible, Mr. Niebla and Universo 2000 by disqualification.

== Reception ==
Gerardo Cuéllar, a reporter for the Mexican "Deportivoros" Sports News website, wrote an article entitled "The 79th Anniversary, nothing new in CMLL", where he noted that while the main event match itself was a "good fight" it also displayed little imagination from the bookers of CMLL as they had the established rudo veteran wrestler lose to the young tecnico Rush, "sacrificing" El Terrible. He also noted that the rudo Puma King winning the mask of Rey Cometa earlier in the night signaled that the tecnico Rush would win the main event. Apolo Valdés who writes for MedioTiempo, a MSN published Mexican sports news site, described the main event as a match with "strong moves" and "Impressive punishment", noting that both Rush and El Terrible worked a very physical, hard hitting match, noting that the crowd was behind the supposed rudo El Terrible and booed the tecnico Rush. Mexican news website El Record stated that the main event was "an exciting fight".

== Results ==
No.	Results	Stipulations	Times
1	Dalys la Caribeña, Goya Kong and Marcela defeated La Amapola, Princesa Blanca and Tiffany	Best two-out-of three-falls six-woman tag team match	10:23
2	Los Hijos del Averno (Ephesto and Mephisto) and Niebla Roja defeated Delta, Stuka Jr. and Valiente	Best two-out-of three-falls six-man tag team match	15:22
3	Ángel de Oro, La Sombra and Titán defeated La Ola Amarilla (Namajague, Okumura and Taichi)	Best two-out-of three-falls six-man tag team match	21:45
4	Puma King defeated Rey Cometa	Best two-out-of three-falls Lucha de Apuestas, Mask vs. Mask match	18:38
5	Los Guerreros del Infierno (Dragón Rojo Jr. and Último Guerrero) and Negro Casas defeated Atlantis, Místico II and Prince Devitt	Best two-out-of three-falls six-man tag team match six-man tag team match	14:13
6	Rush defeated El Terrible	Best two-out-of three-falls Lucha de Apuestas, Hair vs. Hair match	23:15
