= Metálico =

Mexican luchador

Personal information
- Born: Salvador Munguia; November 30 Mexico City, Mexico

Professional wrestling career
- Ring name(s): Tigre Metálico; Metálico; Tigre Infante
- Billed height: 1.73 m (5 ft 8 in)
- Billed weight: 90 kg (200 lb)
- Trained by: Toño Aguirre; Tigre de Oro; Franco Colombo; Shocker
- Debut: 1994
- Retired: May 31, 2019

Salvador Munguia (born November 30 in Mexico City, Mexico) is a Mexican professional wrestling referee and retired professional wrestler, currently working for the Mexican promotion Consejo Mundial de Lucha Libre (CMLL). During his active professional wrestling career he portrayed a tecnico ("Good guy") wrestling character Metálico. Metálico originally worked under a mask and his real name was not a matter of public record, as is often the case with masked wrestlers in Mexico where their private lives are kept a secret from the wrestling fans, but he was forced to unmask after losing a match in August 2014. After retiring & becoming a referee, he adopted the moniker Tigre Infante.

== Professional wrestling career ==
Munguia trained under Toño Aguirre and Tigre de Oro before making his debut in 1994 under the ring name "Tigre Metálico" ("Metallic Tiger"), as an homage to his teacher Tigre de Oro. Over the years Tigre Metalico worked on the Mexican independent circuit and did a stint as a regular for International Wrestling Revolution Group (IWRG).

=== Consejo Mundial de Lucha Libre (2004–present) ===
In 2004 Consejo Mundial de Lucha Libre (CMLL) created the Guapos University ("Hansome University"), or Guapos U, a storyline mimicking realities shows such as the WWE Tough Enough show, searching for a new member to join Shocker, Máscara Mágica and El Terrible as part of Los Guapos. The contestants included, among others, Tigre Metálico who became a regular worker for CMLL at this point. The group participated in a series of matches as they tried to determine a winner, including a tournament of Guapos U only contestants vying for a match for the Mexican National Trios Championship. The tournament was won by Misterioso Jr., Brazo de Oro Jr. and El Texano Jr. although they were unable to win the title. During one of CMLL's shows El Terrible turned on the group and was joined by Último Guerrero in the attack on Los Guapos.Sangre Azteca and El Koreano prevented the rest of the Guapos U class in making the save, leading to the two them being kicked out of the group. Guerrero immediately took both Sangre Azteca and Koreano under his win, forming Pandilla Guerrera ("Gang of Warriors"), a mid-card group associated with Último Guerrero's Los Guerreros del Infierno group. The tournament ended with Alan Stone winning the tournament. Tigre Metalico participated in the first ever Reyes del Aire ("Kings of the Air") tournament but did not win as he was the third man eliminated over-all. He began teaming with Tigre Blanco on a regular basis and at times even joined up with Rey Tigre to form the Trio Los Tigres del Ring ("The Tigers of the Ring").

==== Metálico (2007–2019) ====
Tigre Metálico had his ring character changed in June, 2007 becoming simply "Metálico", removing any reference to the Tiger character, including a redesign of his mask. The repackaged Metálico participated in the 2007 Reyes del Aire tournament, but this time was the first person eliminated from the tournament. In June 2008 Metálico teamed up with Metalik to enter a tournament to determine the new CMLL Arena Coliseo Tag Team Champions. The Metallic themed tag team defeated Los Hombres del Camoflaje (Artillero and Súper Comando) but lost to Los Infernales (Euforia and Nosferatu) in the quarter-final round. Metálico was one of the select few CMLL wrestlers to go on a tour of Spain in 2008. Metálico suffered a leg injury during a match, where he ended landing on one of the ringside seats during a miscalculated move. The injury required surgery and several months away from the ring to recuperate. In late 2010 Metálico teamed up with Starman to compete in a tournament where the winners would get a match for the CMLL Arena Coliseo Tag Team Championship, but the team was defeated by Los Cancerberos del Infierno (Cancerbero and Raziel) in the opening round. Metálico suffered a second, serious leg injury in July 2012, working opposite Bobby Zavala when he landed wrong during the execution of a move and broke his leg during the match. He had to be taken to the hospital where his leg was reset.

He would not return to in-ring action until September, 2012. In the spring of 2013 Metálico became involved in a storyline feud against young rudo El Hijo del Signo, that saw Hijo del Signo cheat more than once to defeat the veteran Metálico. The two found themselves on opposites sides of a match at the Arena Coliseo 70th Anniversary Show on April 7, 2013 with Metálico teaming up with Hombre Bala Jr. and Super Halcón Jr. while El Hijo del Signo teamed up with Nosferatu and Taurus. The storyline between Hijo del Signo and Metálico took center stage during the match as most of the action centered around the two. In the second fall Hijo del Signo pulled Metálico's mask off, hoping to use the distraction to gain a pinfall, but instead he was disqualified when the referee saw the blatant rulebreaking by El Hijo del Signo. The storyline between the two was featured on a number of other shows throughout March and April, including a one-on-one match on CMLL's Super Viernes show, their main weekly show and an indicator that CMLL is escalating the storyline between the two. At the Arena Mexico 57th Anniversary Show Hijo del Signo teamed up with Los Guerreros Tuareg (Arkangel de la Muerte and Skándalo) to defeat Metálico, Sensei and Soberano Jr. with El Hijo del Signo scoring the deciding pinfall on Metálico.

The storyline with Hijo del Signo was dropped over the summer of 2013 with no explanation of why it was ended. On March 24, 2014, Metálico was one of 16 men competing for a spot in the 2014 En Busca de un Ídolo ("In Search of an Idol") tournament. During the torneo cibernetico elimination match Oro Jr. dove onto Metálico and landed poorly, hurting Metálico in the process. When Metálico returned from his injury a month later he teamed up with Oro Jr., during which he began to argue with Oro Jr. after a move went wrong once again. The following week Metálico turned Rudo for the first time in his career as he attacked Oro Jr. at the end of a match against Canelo Casas, Disturbio and El Rebelde. After the match Metálico stated that he blamed Oro Jr. for the shoulder injury that kept him out of the ring. In subsequent weeks the two faced off on multiple occasions, often with Metálico stealing Oro Jr.'s mask. On August 4, following another trios match with Oro and Metálico CMLL announced that the two would face off in a Lucha de Apuestas ("Bet match") on August 10, where both wrestlers will bet their wrestling masks on the outcome of the match. On August 10, Metálico was defeated by Oro Jr. in the Lucha de Apuestas match, forcing him to unmask and reveal his real name, Salvador Munguia and how long he had been a wrestler, 22 years.

Following his mask loss Metálico adopted a new ring persona, taking the nickname El Pedro Infante de Lucha Libre (The Pedro Infante of wrestling), inspired by the Mexican movie legend of the 1940s and 50s. Metálico grew a thin mustache, styled his hair like Infante and began singing and dancing in the ring prior to his matches, in the style of Pedro Infante. Over the summer of 2015 Metálico started a quick feud with the tecnico Leono that led to a Lucha de Apuestas between the two being announced, only to be quietly dropped a few days later. Instead Metálico shifted his attention to Omar Brunetti, feuding with him as part of CMLL's weekly shows on Guadalajara, Jalisco. The storyline led to the two facing off in a Lucha de Apuestas match on September 15 which Metálico won, forcing his opponent to have his hair shaved off as a result. Metálico lost a career vs career match to Virus on May 31, 2019, as part of CMLL's Juicio Final show, it was hinted afterward that he may become a referee.

== Championships and accomplishments ==
- Pro Wrestling Illustrated
  - Ranked No. 363 of the top 500 singles wrestlers in the PWI 500 in 2006

== Luchas de Apuestas record ==
Winner (wager)	Loser (wager)	Location	Event	Date	Notes
Metálico (mask)	Sùper Scare (mask)	N/A	Live event	N/A	
Metálico (mask)	Mr. Estrunod (mask)	Mexico City	Live event	September 17, 2005	
Oro Jr. (mask)	Metálico (mask)	Mexico City	CMLL show	August 10, 2014	
Metálico (hair)	Omar Brunetti (hair)	Guadalajara, Jalisco	CMLL show	September 15, 2015	
Metálico (hair)	Disturbio (hair)	Mexico City	CMLL Show	May 5, 2019	
Virus (career)	Metálico (career)	Mexico City	Juicio Final	May 31, 2019	
