= Stuka Jr. =

Mexican professional wrestler (born 1974)

- Stuka Jr. in July 2020

Personal information
- Born: Omar Alvarado García; July 17, 1979 (age 47) Gómez Palacio, Durango, Mexico
- Family: Oso García (father); Stuka (brother); Oso Negro (brother); Dandy García (brother); Hijo de Stuka Jr. (son); Oso Negro Jr. (nephew); Espacial (nephew)
- Website: www.facebook.com/stuka.junior

Professional wrestling career
- Ring name: Stuka Jr.
- Billed height: 1.70 m (5 ft 7 in)
- Billed weight: 84 kg (185 lb)
- Trained by: Stuka; Satánico; El Moro; Espanto II
- Debut: February 27, 2002

Omar Alvarado García (born July 17, 1979), better known by his ring name Stuka Jr., is a Mexican professional wrestler signed to Consejo Mundial de Lucha Libre (CMLL), where he is a member of the Los Guerreros Laguneros stable.

Stuka Jr. spent the majority of his career wrestling under a mask, styled to look like aviator goggles and an early 20th-century pilot helmet; his tights include designs representing the Luftwaffe's Balkenkreuz insignia, reflecting the Stuka dive bomber from which his name is taken. He is a former NWA World Historic Light Heavyweight Champion, CMLL Arena Coliseo Tag Team Champion (which he held with Fuego for a record four-and-a-half years), Mexican National Trios Champion and Occidente Light Heavyweight Champion. He is also the winner of the 2014 and 2022 Reyes del Aire ("Kings of the Air") tournaments, as well as that year's Torneo Nacional de Parejas Increíbles with Atlantis Jr., to whom Stuka Jr. lost his mask in a Lucha de Apuestas ("bet match") in September, being forced to reveal his identity. He has also wrestled in Japan for New Japan Pro-Wrestling (NJPW), and in the United States for Ring of Honor (ROH).

Stuka Jr. is not, despite what the name indicates, the son of fellow wrestler Stuka, but is actually his younger brother. He is the father of Hijo de Stuka Jr., with whom he won the 2024 Copa Dinastías.

== Personal life ==
Stuka Jr. was born on July 17, 1974, in the Lagunero town of Gómez Palacio, Durango in Mexico. His father was a professional wrestler known under the ring name Oso García ("Bear García"). His 15-year older brother Joel García had already made his professional wrestling debut by the time Stuka Jr. was born, using the name "Stuka". His other brothers followed in his footsteps, working under the ring names "Oso Negro" ("Black Bear") and Dandy García.

== Professional wrestling career ==
=== Early career (2002–2005) ===
Stuka Jr. made his professional wrestling debut in 2002, (Note: Some sources list a "Stuka Jr." wrestling in the 1990s, which is believed to be a wrestler generally known as "Stuka II", who occasionally was billed as "Stuka Jr.") after training with his older brother Stuka and local trainer El Moro. He adopted the ring name Stuka Jr., inspired by his brother, adopting a ring outfit adorned with the German Luftwaffe's Balkenkreuz insignia and a mask fashioned to look like aviator goggles and a helmet, avoiding the use of Nazi insignias on his ring gear. His first confirmed match was on February 27, 2002, where he teamed with Gigolo and La Parka to defeat El Texano, Jerry Estrada and Máscara Maligna (Stuka under a different mask). Initially, the Stuka brothers teamed together, winning the Northern Mexico Tag Team Championship not long after Stuka Jr.'s wrestling debut.

=== Consejo Mundial de Lucha Libre (2005–present) ===
==== Early years (2005–2008) ====
On April 12, 2005, Stuka Jr. made his debut for Consejo Mundial de Lucha Libre (CMLL), teaming with Chamaco Valaguez Jr. and Sensei to defeat Pandilla Guerrera ("Gang of Warriors"; Arkangel de la Muerte, El Koreano and Hooligan). His first high profile match saw him, Texano Jr. and Virus defeat Pandilla Guerrera at the Juicio Final ("Final Judgment") pay-per-view on December 2. As part of CMLL's working relationship with International Wrestling Revolution Group (IWRG), Stuka Jr. wrestled for them at Guerra del Golfo ("Gulf War") on December 22, where he, El Felino, Mephisto and Pierroth escaped a steel cage match, forcing Ultra Mega to compete and lose his mask to Nemesis later that night. In CMLL, he worked opening matches while receiving additional training from head trainer Satánico.

Stuka Jr. participated in his first Reyes del Aire ("Kings of the Air") torneo cibernetico on June 18, 2006, which was won by La Máscara. He participated in the first torneo cibernetico qualifier for the Leyenda de Plata ("The Silver Legend") tournament on May 18, 2007, but was eliminated by eventual winner Mr. Águila. On June 29, Stuka Jr. participated in the Torneo Gran Alternativa ("Great Alternative Tournament"), teaming with veteran Negro Casas in a loss to Dr. Wagner Jr. and Máscara Purpura in the first round. On September 28, Stuka Jr., Metálico and Valiente defeated Los Infernales (Euforia and Nosferatu) and Loco Max in the opening match of the CMLL 74th Anniversary Show.

==== Los Bombadieros (2008–2013) ====
By 2008, Stuka Jr. had begun teaming with Flash on a semi-regular basis, especially on CMLL's "lower level" shows away from Arena México, forming Los Bombadieros ("The Bombardiers"). They were one of sixteen teams entered into a tournament for the revived CMLL Arena Coliseo Tag Team Championship, with the first three rounds commencing on June 22. Stuka Jr. and Flash defeated Astro Boy and Molotov in the first round, Los Guerreros Tuareg ("The Tuareg Warriors"; Nitro and Skándalo) in the quarter-final and Bronco and Diamante Negro in the semi-final. On June 28, they defeated Euforia and Nosferatu in the final to win the championship. They made their first successful title defense on December 14 against Los Infernales. At La Hora Cero ("Zero Hour") on January 11, 2009, Los Infernales defeated them in a non-title match. Stuka Jr. and Flash teamed with Metálico in a loss to Euforia, Skándalo and Virus on July 31 at Infierno en el Ring ("Inferno in the Ring"). On January 6, 2010, Stuka Jr., Máscara Dorada and Metro defeated Poder Mexica (Dragón Rojo Jr., Misterioso Jr. and Sangre Azteca) in a tournament final for the vacant Mexican National Trios Championship, making Stuka Jr. a double champion. Later that month, he was paired with rudo ("heel" or "bad guy") Último Guerrero for the Torneo Nacional de Parejas Increíbles ("National Incredible Pairs Tournament"), defeating Brazo de Plata and Ray Mendoza Jr. in the first round, but lost to Héctor Garza and Toscano in the quarter-finals.

As part of a storyline feud with Exterminador and Máscara Mágica in Guadalajara, on July 27, Stuka Jr. and Metal Blanco defeated them in a masks vs. hair Lucha de Apuestas ("bet match"). Stuka Jr. and Blanco originally appeared to have lost the third and deciding fall, but the local wrestling commission voided the result due to cheating by Extreminador and Mágica, whom they defeated and forced to be shaved bald, per lucha libre traditions. Stuka Jr. participated in "Block A" of the champion-designated Universal Championship tournament on the July 30 Super Viernes, losing to Dorada in the first round. At the CMLL 77th Anniversary Show on September 3, he, Ángel de Oro and Delta defeated Arkangel de la Muerte, Pólvora and Skándalo. On November 18, Dorada announced that he was relinquishing his part of the Mexican National Trios Championship, due to holding three other championships at the same time. Metro and Stuka Jr.'s new partner would be determined in an online poll, which was won by Delta. On January 9, 2011, Stuka Jr., Delta and Metro lost the title to Ángel de Oro, Diamante and Rush. At Homenaje a Dos Leyendas ("Homage to Two Legends") on March 18, he, Diamante and Metro defeated Euforia, Okumura and Raziel. On February 24, 2012, Stuka Jr. and Pólvora lost to Black Warrior and Rey Escorpión in the first round of that year's Torneo Nacional de Parejas Increíbles. On March 19, he unsuccessfully challenged Pólvora for the Mexican National Welterweight Championship.

In late 2012, Stuka Jr. developed a rivalry with Japanese wrestler Namajague, initiated by Namajague's attempts to cheat his way to victory. On September 9, Stuka Jr. and Fuego successfully defended the CMLL Arena Coliseo Tag Team Championship against Namajague and his La Fiebre Amarilla ("The Yellow Fever") partner Okumura. At the CMLL 79th Anniversary Show on September 14, he, Delta and Valiente lost to Ephesto, Mephisto and Niebla Roja. In the following months, Rey Cometa joined Stuka Jr. in his storyline with La Fiebre Amarilla; during a press conference on February 21, 2013, it was announced that the two teams would face off at Homenaje a Dos Leyendas under Lucha de Apuestas rules, where Namajague and Stuka Jr. risked their masks and Okumura and Cometa risked their hair. Before the event, Stuka Jr. and Fuego accepted La Fiebre Amarilla's challenge for a title rematch. On March 3, Stuka Jr. and Fuego's four-and-a-half-year reign as the CMLL Arena Coliseo Tag Team Champions came to an end, losing the title to Namajague and Okumura. On March 15, Stuka Jr. and Cometa defeated La Fiebre Amarilla in the main event of Homenaje a Dos Leyendas, forcing Okumura to have all his hair shaved off and Namajague to unmask and reveal his real name. Ten days later, he and Namajague lost to Rey Bucanero and Shocker in the first round of the Torneo Nacional de Parejas Increíbles. On April 30, he unsuccessfully challenged Escorpión for the CMLL World Lightweight Championship. At the CMLL 80th Anniversary Show on September 13, he, Cometa and Fuego lost to Namajague, Okumura and Tomohiro Ishii.

==== Various storylines and championship pursuits (2014–2023) ====
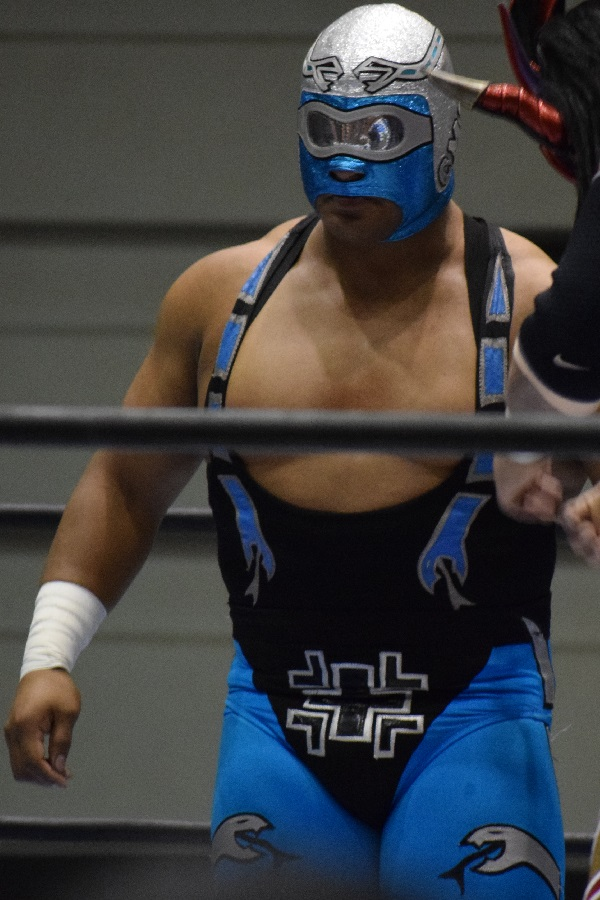
Stuka Jr. at Fantastica Mania 2017 in January 2017

Stuka Jr. and Roja lost to Atlantis and Euforia in the first round of the Torneo Nacional de Parejas Increíbles on March 14, 2014. On April 27, Stuka Jr. outlasted twelve other wrestlers to win the Reyes del Aire. On October 23, he competed in the La Copa Junior VIP ("The VIP Junior Cup") tournament, defeating Delta in the first round before losing to Máximo in the quarter-finals. On February 27, 2015, he was forced to team with Gran Guerrero for the Torneo Nacional de Parejas Increíbles, defeating Blue Panther and Felino in the first round before losing to El Terrible and Máximo in the quarter-finals. At Homenaje a Dos Leyendas on March 20, Stuka Jr., Blue Panther Jr. and The Panther lost to Hechicero, Vangelis and Virus. He was the last wrestler eliminated by La Sombra in the Reyes del Aire on May 1. At the CMLL 82nd Anniversary Show on September 18, he, Guerrero Maya Jr. and Máximo lost to Dragón Rojo Jr., Escorpión and Pólvora.

During this timeframe, Stuka Jr. and various partners unsuccessfully challenged Ephesto, Mephisto and Luciferno for the Mexican National Trios Championship. On May 31, 2016, he unsuccessfully challenged Último Guerrero for the NWA World Historic Middleweight Championship. At the CMLL 83rd Anniversary Show on September 2, he, Marco Corleone and Máximo defeated Ephesto, Mephisto and Shocker. For the Torneo Nacional de Parejas Increíbles on February 17, 2017, Stuka Jr. teamed with Hechicero as part of their slowly developing storyline rivalry, losing to El Terrible and Rush in the first round. At Homenaje a Dos Leyendas on March 17, Stuka Jr., Dragon Lee and Titán defeated Los Guerreros Laguneros (Euforia, Gran Guerrero and Niebla Roja). Hechicero, Dragón Rojo Jr. and Pólvora defeated Stuka Jr., Blue Panther Jr. and The Panther at the CMLL 84th Anniversary Show on September 16. The following year's edition of the tournament saw Stuka Jr. and Forastero lose in the first round to El Terrible and Rush. Stuka Jr. faced Último Guerrero for the same title on May 22, but lost.

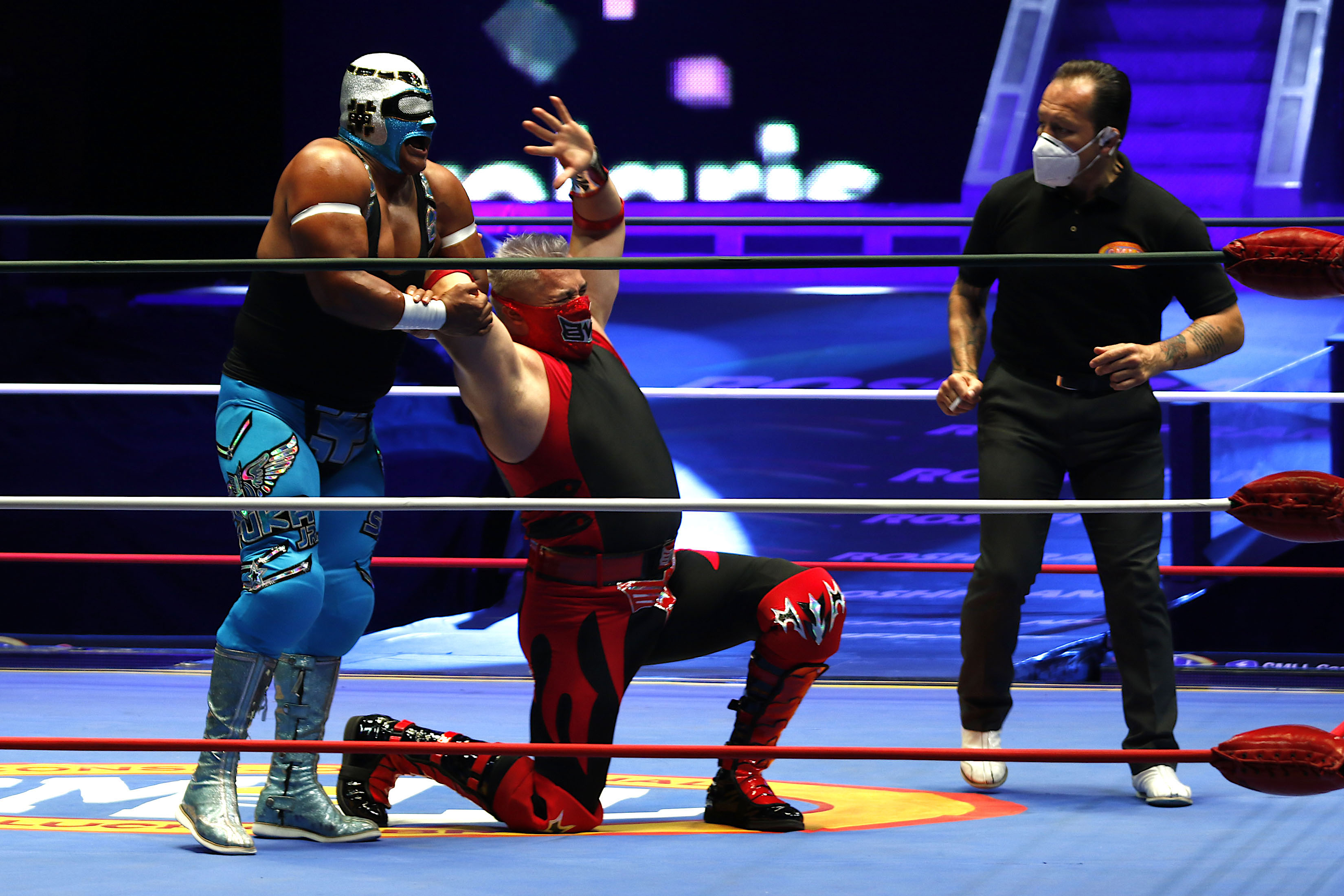
Stuka Jr. wrestling Vangelis in July 2020

The long-running rivalry between Stuka Jr. and Hechicero took another turn on August 14, 2018, as Stuka Jr. defeated Hechicero to win the NWA World Historic Light Heavyweight Championship. He successfully defended it against Hechicero on January 13, 2019. He competed in the Universal Championship tournament on February 1, losing to El Terrible in the first round. He and Hechicero were paired for that year's Torneo Nacional de Parejas Increíbles on April 19, but lost in the first round to El Cuatrero and Místico. He also retained the title against Rey Bucanero on November 5. In early 2021, Stuka Jr. was paired with Guerrero Maya Jr. and Star Jr. in a tournament for the Mexican National Trios Championship, defeating Black Panther, Blue Panther and Blue Panther Jr. in the quarter-finals and Ephesto, Luciferno and Mephisto in the semi-finals, before losing to Cancerbero, Raziel and Virus in the finals on April 24. For a third time, Stuka Jr. and Hechicero were paired for the Torneo Nacional de Parejas Increíbles on June 11, but yet again failed to advance past the first round in a loss to Templario and Volador Jr. On August 10, he, Fugaz and Star Jr. unsuccessfully challenged Cancerbero, Raziel and Virus for the title. Stuka Jr. made further successful defenses of his championship against Ángel de Oro on September 6 and Mephisto on December 21.

Stuka Jr. celebrating a fall with KeMonito, Titán and Volador Jr. in June 2022

On January 28, 2022, Stuka Jr. won the Reyes del Aire VIP after the last wrestler in the match, Atlantis Jr., was disqualified for ripping Stuka Jr.'s mask, beginning a feud between the two. They won that year's Torneo Nacional de Parejas Increíbles on February 25, defeating Averno and Místico in the finals. After the match, Stuka Jr. attacked and unmasked Atlantis Jr. On April 15, he lost to Místico in the semi-finals of the Universal Championship tournament. He also lost to Atlantis Jr. in the first round of the La Copa Junior VIP by disqualification. Their feud led to a Lucha de Apuestas in the main event of the CMLL 89th Anniversary Show on September 16, where Stuka Jr. was defeated by Atlantis Jr., thus being forced to unmask and reveal his birth name, Omar Alvarado García. On November 1, Stuka Jr. outlasted Dark Panther, Dragón Rojo Jr., El Sagrado, Esfinge, Niebla Roja, Panterita del Ring, Rey Bucanero, Rugido and Star Jr. to become the number one contender for the Rey del Inframundo ("King of the Underworld") championship, which he won from El Terrible three days later. On December 16, Stuka Jr. and Neón lost to Halcón Suriano Jr. and Soberano Jr. in the first round of that year's Torneo Gran Alternativa.

==== Los Guerreros Laguneros (2023–present) ====
In January 2023, Stuka Jr. officially joined Los Guerreros Laguneros after having wrestled alongside them, turning rudo for the first time in his career. On February 4, he lost the NWA World Historic Light Heavyweight Championship to Atlantis Jr., ending his reign at 1,635 days, the longest reign in the championship's history. In June, Stuka Jr. received the opportunity to team with his son, Hijo de Stuka Jr., in the family-oriented Copa Dinastías ("Dynasties Cup") tournament. They defeated Misterio Negro and Misterioso Jr. in the first round and Euforia and Soberano Jr. in the semi-finals, before losing to Dr. Karonte I and Místico in the finals. On November 3, he lost the Rey del Inframundo championship to Bárbaro Cavernario. On November 17, he and old rival Hechicero outlasted Ángel de Oro, Atlantis, Cavernario, El Terrible, El Sagrado, Esfinge, Niebla Roja, Star Black, Último Guerrero and Volcano to advance to the finals of the Leyenda de Azul the following week, where Hechicero was victorious.

Stuka Jr. and his son took part in the Torneo Gran Alternativa, but lost to Brillante Jr. and Místico in the first round on January 19, 2024. He was once more paired with Hechicero for the Torneo Nacional de Parejas Increibles on March 22, faring better as they defeated Dragón Rojo Jr. and Templario in the first round, but lost to Atlantis Jr. and Soberano Jr. in the semi-finals. On June 16, Stuka Jr. and Hijo de Stuka Jr. won that year's Copa Dinastías, lastly defeating Euforia and Soberano Jr. by disqualification after the former unmasked his son. He competed in the Reyes del Aire on February 4, 2025, eliminating Titán before being eliminated near the end by eventual winner Neón. On November 2, Stuka Jr. defeated Akuma, Euforia and Virus in a four-way elimination match to win the Copa Tzompantli ("Tzompantli Cup"). On September 4, 2026, Stuka Jr. and Gran Guerrero participated in a three-way match to determine one of the spots in the CMLL World Tag Team Championship four-way match at the CMLL 93rd Anniversary Show, which was won by Máscara Dorada and Neón.

In November 2026, Stuka suffered a knee injury in a match against Esfinge that required surgery.

=== New Japan Pro-Wrestling (2014–2024) ===
From January 14 to 19, 2014, Stuka Jr. made his debut in Japan as part of the New Japan Pro-Wrestling (NJPW) and CMLL co-produced Fantastica Mania 2014 tour, during which he worked undercard matches alongside Rey Cometa. In January 2015, he and Cometa took part in a tag team tournament during the Fantastica Mania 2015 tour, defeating Cavernario and Mr. Niebla in the first round before losing to Gran Guerrero and Último Guerrero in the semi-finals. He also unsuccessfully challenged Mephisto for the Mexican National Light Heavyweight Championship. Stuka Jr. subsequently participated in the Fantastica Mania 2016 and Fantastica Mania 2017 tours in January 2016 and 2017, respectively.

Stuka Jr. returned to Japan during the Fantastica Mania 2020 tour in January 2020, where he successfully defended the NWA World Historic Light Heavyweight Championship against Okumura. Four years later, Stuka Jr. and Los Guerreros Laguneros stablemate Último Guerrero won a faction tag team tournament during the Fantastica Mania 2024 tour, defeating Los Ingobernables de Japon (BUSHI and Titán) in the first round and Los Depredadores (Magnus and Volador Jr.) in the finals.

=== Ring of Honor (2016–2019) ===
Through CMLL's working relationship, Stuka Jr. wrestled for Ring of Honor (ROH) in the United States on several occasions. He made his ROH debut on July 16, 2016, losing to Kamaitachi (who had worked for CMLL before joining ROH). Stuka Jr. returned to ROH on June 15 and 16, 2018, during the "State of the Art" tour in Texas. On the first night, he, Atlantis and Guerrero Maya Jr. defeated SoCal Uncensored (Christopher Daniels, Frankie Kazarian and Scorpio Sky). The next night, they unsuccessfully challenged The Kingdom (Matt Taven, T. K. O'Ryan and Vinny Marseglia) for the ROH World Six-Man Tag Team Championship. On November 4, Stuka Jr. participated in the Survival of the Fittest tournament, losing to winner Marty Scurll in the opening round, which also involved Silas Young. On the December 1 episode of Ring of Honor Wrestling, Stuka Jr. and Guerrero Maya Jr. failed to win the ROH World Tag Team Championship from Kazarian and Sky.

Stuka Jr. and Guerrero Maya Jr. represented CMLL at the Crockett Cup tournament on April 27, 2019 in Concord, North Carolina, but were eliminated after a loss to Royce Isaacs and Thom Latimer in the first round. At the Summer Supercard pay-per-view on August 9, he, Carístico and Soberano Jr. defeated Cavernario, Hechicero and Templario. Stuka Jr. made his final appearances for ROH in September, participating in all three nights of the Global Wars Espectacular tour.

== Professional wrestling style and persona ==
Until 2023, Stuka Jr. has always portrayed a tecnico, with the crowds generally behind him, especially for headline matches such as the Lucha de Apuestas victory over Okumura and Namajague. He is credited with inventing the "Torpedo Plancha" dive. For this move, Stuka Jr. climbs to the top rope, facing the ring before leaping backward in a twisting motion over the top ring post, landing on an opponent on the floor. Another high flying move that Stuka Jr. often uses during tag or trios matches involves one of his tag team partners performing a monkey flip off the entrance ramp, in the process throwing Stuka Jr. high up in the air and onto an opponent on the floor. Stuka Jr. often wins his matches with the "Torpedo Splash", a leaping splash off the top rope where he keeps both arms straight down the side to simulate a bomb dropping from the sky. His wrestling style has earned him the nickname "the Human Missile".

== Championships and accomplishments ==
- Consejo Mundial de Lucha Libre
  - NWA World Historic Light Heavyweight Championship (1 time)
  - Mexican National Trios Championship (1 time) – with Metro and Máscara Dorada/Delta
  - CMLL Arena Coliseo Tag Team Championship (1 time) – with Fuego
  - Occidente Light Heavyweight Championship (1 time)
  - Reyes del Aire (2014)
  - Reyes del Aire VIP (2022)
  - Torneo Nacional de Parejas Increibles (2022) - with Atlantis Jr.
  - Copa Dinastías (2024) - with Hijo de Stuka Jr.
  - Interfaction Tag Team Tournament (2024) - with Ultimo Guerrero
  - Rey del Inframundo (2022)
  - Copa Tzompantli (2025)
- Pro Wrestling Illustrated
  - PWI ranked him #380 of the top 500 singles wrestlers in the PWI 500 in 2016
- Regional Championships
  - Durango Trios Championship (1 time) – with Bala de Plata and Piloto Suicida
  - Northern Mexico Lightweight Championship (1 time)
  - Northern Mexico Tag Team Championship (1 time) – with Stuka
  - Nuevo León Mexico Trios Championship (1 time) – Tigre Universitario and Gato Volador

== Luchas de Apuestas record ==
Winner (wager)	Loser (wager)	Location	Event	Date	Notes
Abismo Negro (hair)	Stuka Jr. (hair)	Unknown	Live event	N/A	(Note: This was a Lucha del reves match, which is a hair vs. hair between two masked wrestlers.)
Stuka Jr. (mask)	Kempo Kid (mask)	Monterrey, Nuevo León,	Live event	Unknown	
Stuka Jr. (mask)	Jerry Estrada (hair)	Gomez Palacio, Durango	Live event	October 21, 2002	
Stuka Jr. (mask)	Flecha II (mask)	Mexico City, Mexico	Live event	April 2, 2006	
Stuka Jr. (mask)	Jeque (mask)	Mexico City, Mexico	Live event	April 15, 2007	
Stuka Jr. (mask) and Metal Blanco (mask)	Máscara Mágica (hair) and Exterminador (hair)	Guadalajara, Jalisco	Live event	July 27, 2010	
Stuka Jr. (mask) and Rey Cometa (hair)	La Fiebre Amarilla (Okumura (hair) and Namajague (mask))	Mexico City, Mexico	Homenaje a Dos Leyendas	March 15, 2013	
Atlantis Jr. (mask)	Stuka Jr. (mask)	Mexico City, Mexico	CMLL 89th Anniversary Show	September 16, 2022	
