= Skándalo =

Mexican professional wrestler

Personal information
- Born: January 7, 1982 (age 44) Mexico City, Mexico

Professional wrestling career
- Ring name: Skándalo / Eskándalo
- Billed height: 1.69 m (5 ft 6 1/2 in)
- Billed weight: 96 kg (212 lb)
- Trained by: Tony Salazar; Ringo Mendoza
- Debut: August 23, pre-1996 - Xochimilco
- Retired: March 28, 2017

Skándalo (born January 7, 1982, in Mexico City, Mexico) is a Mexican retired professional wrestler. He is known for his time with the Mexican promotion Consejo Mundial de Lucha Libre (CMLL), portraying a rudo ("bad guy") wrestling character. Skándalo's real name is not a matter of public record, as is often the case with masked wrestlers in Mexico where their private lives are kept a secret from the wrestling fans. He has revealed that he is the son of Juan Manuel Mar, who is part of CMLL's booking team.

== Personal life ==
Skándalo is the son of Juan Manuel Mar who used to wrestle under the ring name Panico, and is often referred to as such even after his retirement from the ring. Manuel Mar is part of Consejo Mundial de Lucha Libre's (CMLL) booking team and thus is one of the men that plan the matches and storylines of the promotion. He is a third-generation wrestler as both his paternal and maternal grandfathers, Manuel Robles and Raul Reyes, were wrestlers as well. His great uncles include wrestlers Huroki Sito, Sugi Sito and Panchito Robles, his uncles wrestle as El Jabato and Zapatista, his cousin is Stigma, and his second cousins Victor Mar Manuel (who worked as Black Cat until his death), Panchito Robles Jr., La Briosa were-or-are also wrestlers.

== Professional wrestling career ==
While Skándalo is the son of a former wrestler he was not trained by his father, instead he was trained by two of CMLL's trainers Tony Salazar and Ringo Mendoza before his debut on August 20, 2004. After gaining experience on the Mexican independent circuit he began working regularly for CMLL in 2006, working low level matches as a rudo ("bad guy" wrestling character). On October 2, 2007, he participated in that year's Reyes del Aire ("Kings of the Air") tournament, but was the first man eliminated in the 12-man torneo cibernetico.

=== Los Guerreros Tuareg (2007–2014) ===
In mid-2007 CMLL decided to repackage the group Pandilla Guerrera (Spanish for "Gang of Warriors"), they added Skándalo to the group to replace departing team members, joining with Nitro (Group leader), Arkangel de la Muerte, Hooligan, Doctor X and Loco Max. The group was repackaged as Los Guerreros Tuareg ("The Tuareg Warriors"), inspired by the Tuareg Nomadic tribe, which was reflected in the robes and headgear the team wore to the ring and a more African tribal type entrance music. Nitro and Skándalo teamed up to participate in a CMLL Arena Coliseo Tag Team Championship Tournament in the summer of 2008. In the first round the duo won by defeating Sensei and Neutron. In the next round they lost to eventual tournament winners Flash and Stuka, Jr. Skándalo was teamed up with Atlantis to participate in the 2008 Gran Alternativa tournament, where a rookie and a veteran teams up. The team was eliminated in the first round when they lost to Dos Caras, Jr. and Metalik. In late 2009 the Los Guerreros Tuareg team of Skándalo, Arkangel de la Muerte and Loco Max entered a tournament to determine new Mexican National Trios Champions after the title had been vacated. The trio lost to eventual tournament winners Máscara Dorada, Metro and Stuka, Jr. On September 3, 2010, Skándalo participated in the CMLL 77th Anniversary Show, CMLL's biggest show of the year. He teamed up with Arkangel de la Muerte and Pólvora, losing a Best two out of three falls Six-man tag team match to Ángel de Oro, Delta and Stuka, Jr.

=== Retirement ===
At some point, Skandalo suffered an eye injury which ultimately forced him to retire from in-ring competition. Skandalo's final match was on March 28, 2017, on a Tuesday Arena Mexico show, teaming with El Sagrado & Virus to defeat Esfinge, Soberano Jr. & Tritón. Due to his father's role in the company, he transitioned to working for CMLL's programming department, specifically merchandising and concessions. He was publicly seen in his Skandalo persona for the first time since the injury at Fantastica Mania 2020, appearing as part of the annual Black Cat memorial match ceremony.

== Championships and accomplishments ==
- Consejo Mundial de Lucha Libre
  - Torneo Homenaje A Dr. X
- Comisión de Box y Lucha Libre Morelos
  - Morelos State Middleweight Championship (1 time)
