= La Copa Junior (2019) =

Mexican professional wrestling tournament

- Poster for the tournament finals show
- Promotion: Consejo Mundial de Lucha Libre
- Date: December 3, 2019; December 10, 2019; December 17, 2019
- City: Mexico City, Mexico
- Venue: Arena México

Event chronology
| ← Previous; Leyendas Mexicanas | Next → Sin Piedad |

La Copa Junior chronology
| ← Previous; 2017 VIP | Next → — |

The La Copa Junior (2019) (Spanish for "The Junior Cup") was a professional wrestling tournament produced and scripted by the Mexican wrestling promotion Consejo Mundial de Lucha Libre (CMLLl; Spanish "World Wrestling Council"). The tournament ran from December 3 to December 17, 2019 as part of CMLL's weekly Tuesday night shows in Arena México. The La Copa Junior tournament exclusively feature second, third or fourth generation wrestlers as they compete for the cup. The 2019 La Copa Junior was the eleventh time CMLL has held the tournament since the first tournament in 1996.

After two separate torneo cibernetico elimination matches Guerrero Maya Jr. and Universo 2000 Jr. both qualified for the finals of the tournament on December 17. Universo 2000 Jr. defeated Guerrero Maya Jr. two falls to one to win the 2019 La Copa Junior tournament.

== Production ==
=== Background ===
Starting in 1996 the Mexican professional wrestling promotion Consejo Mundial de Lucha Libre ("World Wrestling Council"; CMLL) held their first ever La Copa Junior tournament. CMLL held the tournament to celebrate the fact that lucha libre in Mexico is often a family tradition, with a large number of second, third, or even fourth generation wrestlers following the footsteps of their relatives. The premise of the tournament is that all participants are second-generation or more, although at times the family relationship is a storylines family relationship and not an actual one. One example of this is Dragón Rojo Jr. being billed as the grandson of Dragón Rojo, when in reality that is simply a storyline created by CMLL. The original La Copa Junior was won by Héctor Garza.

CMLL would not hold another La Copa Junior until the 2005 tournament (won by Shocker), followed by a 2006 tournament won by Dos Caras Jr. The tournament did not return until 2010 where Dragón Rojo Jr. won the 2010 version. In 2012 third-generation luchador La Sombra won the Junior cup

In 2014, CMLL held two La Copa Junior tournaments, first a tournament on January 1, won by Super Halcón Jr., followed by a VIP tournament, featuring higher card wrestlers than the usual tournaments, which was won by Máximo The semi-regular tournament returned in 2016, won by Esfinge In 2017, Soberano Jr. won the La Copa Junior Nuevos Valores

=== Storylines ===
The tournament will feature a number of professional wrestling matches with different wrestlers involved in pre-existing scripted feuds, plots and storylines. Wrestlers were portrayed as either heels (referred to as rudos in Mexico, those that portray the "bad guys") or faces (técnicos in Mexico, the "good guy" characters) as they followed a series of tension-building events, which culminated in a wrestling match or series of matches.

=== Family relationships ===
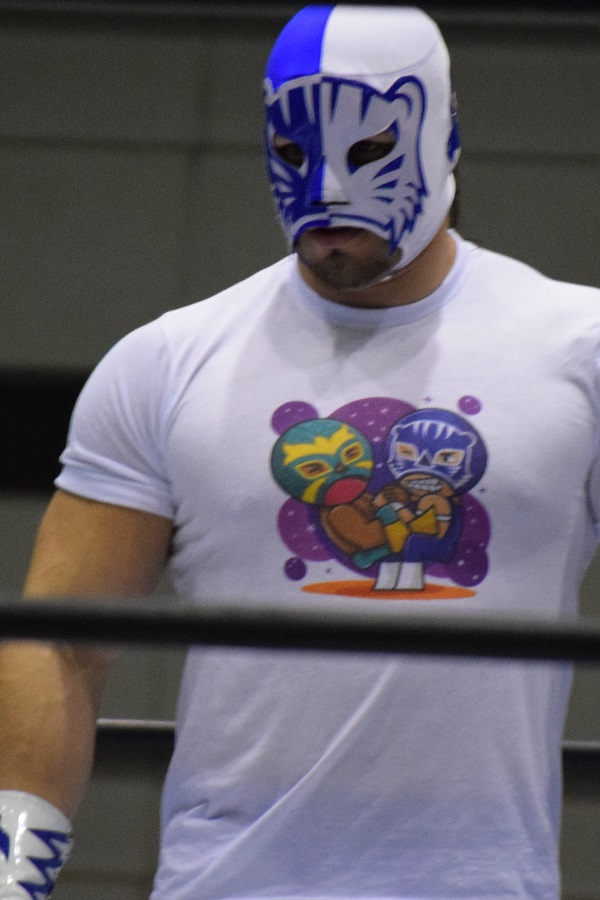
Blue Panther Jr. who competed in Block A but did not qualify for the finals.

| Wrestler | Family | Relationship | Group | Ref(s). |
|---|---|---|---|---|
| Bengala | Príncipe Odín | Father | Block B | |
| Black Panther | Blue Panther | Father | Block B | |
| Blue Panther Jr. | Blue Panther | father | Block A | |
| Drone | Hombre Bala | father | Block A | |
| Esfinge | Magnum | Father | Block B | |
| Espanto Jr. | Espanto Jr. | Father | Block B | |
| Guerrero Maya Jr. | Guerrero Maya / Black Terry | Father | Block A | |
| Halcón Suriano Jr. | Halcón Suriano | Father | Block B | |
| El Hijo del Signo | El Signo | Father | Block A | |
| Leono | Unknown | Unknown | Block A | |
| Magnus | Tony Salazar | Father | Block B | |
| Sangre Imperial | Sangre Chicana | Father | Block A | |
| Oro Jr. | Plata | Father | Block A | |
| Principe Odin Jr. | Príncipe Odín | Father | Block B | |
| Robin | Robin Hood | Father | Block B | |
| Stigma | Panico | Father | Block B | |
| Súper Astro Jr. | Súper Astro | Father | N/A | |
| Tiger | El Felino | Father | Block A | |
| Toro Bill Jr. | Toro Bill | Father | Block A | |
| Universo 2000 Jr. | Universo 2000 | Father | Block B | |
| Yago | Coco Blanco | Father | Block A | |

== Tournament overview ==
=== Cibernetico 1 (December 3) ===
| # | Eliminated | Eliminated by |
|---|---|---|
| 1 | Leono | Oro Jr. |
| 2 | Sangre Imperial | Hijo del Signo |
| 3 | Toro Bill Jr. | Drone |
| 4 | Yago | Tiger |
| 5 | Hijo del Signo | Blue Panther Jr. |
| 6 | Oro Jr. | Guerrero Maya Jr. |
| 7 | Drone | Tiger |
| 8 | Tiger | Blue Panther Jr. |
| 9 | Blue Panther Jr. | Guerrero Maya Jr. |
| 10 | Winner | Guerrero Maya Jr. |

=== Cibernetico 2 (December 10) ===
| # | Eliminated | Eliminated by |
|---|---|---|
| 1 | Principe Odin Jr. | Magnus |
| 2 | Bengala | Robin |
| 3 | Halcón Suriano Jr. | Espanto Jr. |
| 4 | Magnus | Stigma |
| 5 | Espanto Jr. | Universo 2000 Jr. |
| 6 | Robin | Black Panther |
| 7 | Black Panther | Disqualification |
| 8 | Stigma | Universo 2000 Jr. |
| 9 | Esfinge Black Panther | Universo 2000 Jr. |
| 10 | Winner | Universo 2000 Jr. |

== Tournament shows ==
=== December 3 ===
| No. | Results | Stipulations |
|---|---|---|
| 1 | Pequeño Violencia and Pierrothito defeated Fantasy and Último Dragóncito | Best two-out-of-three falls tag team match |
| 2 | Espíritu Negro and Los Cancerberos del Infierno (Cancerbero and Raziel) defeated Eléctrico, Pegasso, and Príncipe Diamante | Best two-out-of-three falls six-man tag team match |
| 3 | Guerrero Maya Jr. defeated Blue Panther Jr., Drone, Sangre Imperial, Toro Bill Jr., Oro Jr., Hijo del Signo, Leono, Tiger, and Yago | La Copa Junior Block A, torneo cibernetico elimination match |
| 4 | Ángel de Oro, Niebla Roja, and Soberano Jr. defeated Los Hijos del Infierno (Ephesto, Luciferno, and Mephisto) | Best two-out-of-three falls six-man tag team match |
| 5 | Euforia defeated Carístico | Best two-out-of-three falls match |

=== December 10 ===
| No. | Results | Stipulations | Times |
|---|---|---|---|
| 1 | Shockercito and Angelito defeated Pierrothito and Pequeño Olímpico | Best two-out-of-three falls tag team match | — |
| 2 | El Hijo del Signo, Inquisidor, and Grako defeated Eléctrico, Sangre Imperial, and Oro Jr. | Best two-out-of-three falls six-man tag team match | — |
| 3 | Estrellita, Marcela, and Princesa Sugehit defeated Dalys la Caribeña, Tiffany, and La Amapola | Best two-out-of-three falls six-woman tag team match | — |
| 4 | Espíritu Negro vs. Príncipe Diamante ended in a double count out | Lighting match, 1 fall, 10-minute time limit | 08:59 |
| 5 | Universo 2000 Jr. defeated Esfinge, Black Panther, Espanto Jr., Magnus, Príncipe Odín Jr., Stigma, Robin, Halcón Suriano Jr. and Bengala | La Copa Junior Block B, torneo cibernetico elimination match | — |
| 6 | Shocker, El Terrible, and Euforia defeated Carístico, Titán, and Star Jr. | Best two-out-of-three falls six-man tag team match | — |

=== December 17 ===
| No. | Results | Stipulations |
|---|---|---|
| 1 | Leono and Robin defeated El Cholo and Inquisidor | Best two-out-of-three falls tag team match |
| 2 | La Guerrera, Lluvia, and Marcela defeated La Amapola, La Infernal, and La Seductora | Best two-out-of-three falls six-man tag team match |
| 3 | Misterioso Jr., El Sagrado, and Tiger defeated Dulce Gardenia, Pegasso, and Príncipe Diamante | Best two-out-of-three falls six-woman tag team match |
| 4 | Universo 2000 Jr. defeated Guerrero Maya Jr. | Best two-out-of-three falls match, La Copa Junior tournament final |
| 5 | Okumura, Rey Bucanero, and El Terrible defeated Flyer, Kráneo, and Stuka Jr. | Best two-out-of-three falls six-man tag team match |
| 6 | Ángel de Oro, Diamante Azul, and Niebla Roja defeated Los Guerreros Laguneros (Euforia and Gran Guerrero) and Shocker by disqualification | Best two-out-of-three falls six-man tag team match |
