= La Copa Junior VIP (2017) =

Mexican professional wrestling tournament

- Official poster for the tournament show
- Promotion: Consejo Mundial de Lucha Libre
- Date: December 1, 2017
- City: Mexico City, Mexico
- Venue: Arena México

Event chronology
← Previous; Leyendas Mexicanas	Next → Leyenda de Azul

La Copa Junior chronology
← Previous; Nuevos Valores	Next → 2019

La Copa Junior VIP (2017) (Spanish for "The New Values Junior Cup") was a professional wrestling tournament produced and scripted by the Mexican wrestling promotion Consejo Mundial de Lucha Libre (CMLLl; Spanish "World Wrestling Council"). The tournament took place on December 1, 2017, in Arena México in Mexico City, Mexico. CMLL's recurring La Copa Junior tournament featured second, third, or fourth-generation wrestlers competing against each other. The 2017 version of the La Copa Junior was the tenth tournament held by CMLL.

The 2017 La Copa Junior VIP tournament was contested under torneo cibernetico elimination match rules. The six man teams saw Niebla Roja, Carístico, Volador Jr., Místico, Dragon Lee, and Stuka Jr. face off against the team of Negro Casas, Mephisto, Shocker, Euforia, Sansón, and El Felino. In the end Niebla Roja pinned Mephisto to eliminate him, earning the 2017 La Copa Junior VIP trophy.

== Production ==
=== Background ===
Starting in 1996 the Mexican professional wrestling promotion Consejo Mundial de Lucha Libre ("World Wrestling Council"; CMLL) held their first ever La Copa Junior tournament. CMLL held the tournament to celebrate the fact that lucha libre in Mexico is often a family tradition, with a large number of second, third, or even fourth generation wrestlers following the footsteps of their relatives. The premise of the tournament is that all participants are second-generation or more, although at times the family relationship is a storylines family relationship and not an actual one. One example of this is Dragón Rojo Jr. being billed as the grandson of Dragón Rojo, when in reality that is simply a storyline created by CMLL. The original La Copa Junior was won by Héctor Garza.

CMLL would not hold another La Copa Junior until the 2005 tournament (won by Shocker), followed by a 2006 tournament won by Dos Caras Jr. The tournament did not return until 2010 where Dragón Rojo Jr. won the 2010 version. In 2012 third-generation luchador La Sombra won the Junior cup

In 2014, CMLL held two La Copa Junior tournaments, first a tournament on January 1, won by Super Halcón Jr., followed by a VIP tournament, featuring higher card wrestlers than the usual tournaments, which was won by Máximo The semi-regular tournament returned in 2016, won by Esfinge In 2017, Soberano Jr. won the La Copa Junior Nuevos Valores

=== Storylines ===
The tournament featured a number of professional wrestling matches with different wrestlers involved in pre-existing scripted feuds, plots and storylines. Wrestlers were portrayed as either heels (referred to as rudos in Mexico, those that portray the "bad guys") or faces (técnicos in Mexico, the "good guy" characters) as they followed a series of tension-building events, which culminated in a wrestling match or series of matches.

=== Family relationships ===
Wrestler	Family	Relationship	Ref(s).
Carístico	Dr. Karonte	father	
Negro Casas	Pepe Casas	father	
Dragon Lee	La Bestia del Ring	father	
Euforia	El Soberano	father	
El Felino	Pepe Casas	father	
Niebla Roja	Apolo Chávez	father	
Mephisto	Astro Rey / Kahoz	father	
Mistico	Person	La Bestia del Ring	
Sansón	Cien Caras	father	
Shocker	Rubén Pato Soria	father	
Stuka Jr.	Stuka	brother	
Volador Jr.	Volador / Super Parka	father	

== Tournament ==
=== Order of elimination ===
#	Eliminated	Eliminated by	Time
1	Stuka Jr.	Euforia	07:39
2	El Felino	Dragon Lee	09:35
3	Dragon Lee	Sansón	14:18
4	Euforia	Carístico	15:00
5	Shocker	Volador Jr. (disqualification)	16:54
6	Volador Jr.	Shocker (disqualification)	16:54
7	Negro Casas	Carístico	18:00
8	Místico	Sansón	19:00
9	Sansón	Carístico	23:22
10	Carístico	Mephisto	23:56
11	Mephisto	Niebla Roja	27:45
12	Niebla Roja Winner		27:45

=== Results ===
No.	Results	Stipulations	Times
1	Shockercito and Stukita defeated Mercurio and Pequeño Olímpico by disqualification	Best two-out-of-three falls tag team match	13:45
2	Los Cancerberos del Infierno (Cancerbero, Raziel, and Virus) defeated Astral, Pegasso, and Stigma	Best two-out-of-three falls six-man tag team match	12:28
3	Lady Maravilla, Marcela, and Silueta defeated Dalys la Caribeña, La Seductora, and Tiffany	Best two-out-of-three falls six-man tag team match	13:44
4	Hechicero, Sam Adonis, and Vangellys defeated Blue Panther, Guerrero Maya Jr., and Rey Cometa	Best two-out-of-three falls six-man tag team match	17:06
5	Mr. Niebla, Rey Bucanero, and El Terrible defeated Marco Corleone, Titán, and Valiente	Best two-out-of-three falls six-man tag team match	11:09
6	Niebla Roja defeated Carístico, Negro Casas, Volador Jr., Mephisto, Místico, Shocker, Dragon Lee, Euforia, Sansón, Stuka Jr., and El Felino	2017 La Copa Junior VIP 12-man torneo cibernetico elimination match	27:45
