= La Copa Junior Nuevos Valores (2017) =

Mexican professional wrestling tournament

- Official poster for the tournament final
- Promotion: Consejo Mundial de Lucha Libre
- Date: April 14, 2017; April 21, 2017; April 28, 2017
- City: Mexico City, Mexico
- Venue: Arena México

Event chronology
← Previous; Reyes del Aire	Next →: 61. Aniversario de Arena México

La Copa Junior chronology
← Previous; 2016	Next → 2017 VIP

La Copa Junior Nuevos Valores (2017) (Spanish for "The New Values Junior Cup") was a professional wrestling tournament produced and scripted by the Mexican wrestling promotion Consejo Mundial de Lucha Libre (CMLLl; Spanish "World Wrestling Council"). The tournament ran from April 14, 2017 to April 28, 2017 in Arena México in Mexico City, Mexico. CMLL's recurring La Copa Junior tournament featured second, third or fourth generation wrestlers completing against each other. The 2017 version of the La Copa Junior was the ninth tournament held by CMLL.

The format of the 2017 tournament matches the previous tournament, as well as a number of CMLL's other annual tournaments. 16 wrestlers are divided into two groups of eight that wrestle in a torneo cibernetico elimination match on April 14 and April 21, the survivor of each qualifying torneo cibernetico then faces off against each other in the finals on April 28, 2017. On April 28, 2017 Soberano Jr. defeated Sansón to win the tournament.

== Production ==
=== Background ===
Starting in 1996 the Mexican professional wrestling promotion Consejo Mundial de Lucha Libre ("World Wrestling Council"; CMLL) held their first ever La Copa Junior tournament. CMLL held the tournament to celebrate the fact that lucha libre in Mexico is often a family tradition, with a large number of second, third, or even fourth generation wrestlers following the footsteps of their relatives. The premise of the tournament is that all participants are second-generation or more, although at times the family relationship is a storylines family relationship and not an actual one. One example of this is Dragón Rojo Jr. being billed as the grandson of Dragón Rojo, when in reality that is simply a storyline created by CMLL. The original La Copa Junior was won by Héctor Garza.

CMLL would not hold another La Copa Junior until the 2005 tournament (won by Shocker), followed by a 2006 tournament won by Dos Caras Jr. The tournament did not return until 2010 where Dragón Rojo Jr. won the 2010 version. In 2012 third-generation luchador La Sombra won the Junior cup

In 2014, CMLL held two La Copa Junior tournaments, first a tournament on January 1, won by Super Halcón Jr., followed by a VIP tournament, featuring higher card wrestlers than the usual tournaments, which was won by Máximo The semi-regular tournament returned in 2016, won by Esfinge In 2017, Soberano Jr. won the La Copa Junior Nuevos Valores

The 2017 version of the tournament was given the tagline Nuevos Valores, emphasizing that this specific tournament would focus on the "new guys", younger wrestlers who normally wrestle on the low-to-middle part of the show, between matches 1 and 3. CMLL has previously held tournaments to focus on the younger wrestlers such as the Sangre Nueva tournament or "Forjando un Idolo", but this would be the first time CMLL specifically designated the Copa Junior as being strictly for "new guys". Artillero, who competed in Block B was the only wrestler to not fit the "new" mold, as he had been working for CMLL for 17 years at that point, starting in 2005.

=== Storylines ===
The tournament featured a number of professional wrestling matches with different wrestlers involved in pre-existing scripted feuds, plots and storylines. Wrestlers were portrayed as either heels (referred to as rudos in Mexico, those that portray the "bad guys") or faces (técnicos in Mexico, the "good guy" characters) as they followed a series of tension-building events, which culminated in a wrestling match or series of matches.

=== Family relationship ===
Wrestler	Family	Relationship	Group	Ref(s).
Artillero	Principe Odin	father	Block B	
Blue Panther Jr.	Blue Panther	father	Block B	
Canelo Casas	Pepe Casas	grandfather	Block A	
El Cuatrero	Cien Caras	father	Block A	
Drone	Hombre Bala	father	Block A	
Esfinge	Magnum	father	Block B	
Espanto Jr.	Espanto Jr.	father	Block A	
Forastero	Cien Caras, Máscara Año 2000, Universo 2000	uncles	Block B	
El Hijo del Signo	El Signo	father	Block A	
Magnus	Tony Salazar	father	Block B	
Oro Jr.	Plata	father	Block A	
The Panther	Blue Panther	father	Block A	
Sansón	Cien Caras	father	Block B	
Soberano Jr.	Euforia	father	Block A	
Star Jr.	Star Boy	father	Block B	.
Stigma	El Jabato	father	Block B	

== Tournament ==
=== Group A ===
Order	Wrestler	Eliminated by
1	El Hijo del Signo	The Panther
2	Oro Jr.	Canelo Casas
3	Espanto Jr.	Drone
4	The Panther	El Cuatrero
5	Canelo Casas	Soberano Jr.
6	Drone	El Cuatrero
7	El Cuatrero	Soberano Jr.
8	Winner	Soberano Jr.

=== Group B ===
Order	Wrestler	Eliminated by
1	Artillero	Star Jr.
2	Stigma	Forastero
3	Star Jr.	Sansón
4	Magnus	Blue Panther Jr.
5	Esfinge	Sansón
6	Forastero	Blue Panther Jr.
7	Blue Panther Jr.	Sansón
8	Winner	Sansón

=== Results ===
==== April 14 ====
No.	Results	Stipulations	Times
1	Mercurio, Pequeño Nitro, and Pierrothito defeated Shockercito, Stukita, and Último Dragóncito	Best two-out-of-three falls six-man tag team match	14:45
2	Soberano Jr. defeated The Panther, Drone, Oro Jr., El Cuatrero, Canelo Casas, El Hijo del Signo, and Espanto Jr.	2017 La Copa Junior Nuevo Valores semifinal 8-man torneo cibernetico elimination match	30:34
3	Ángel de Oro defeated Hechicero	"Lighting match", 1 fall, 10 minute time limit	08:53
4	Diamante Azul, Stuka Jr., and Valiente defeated Mephisto, Negro Casas, and Sam Adonis	Best two-out-of-three falls six-man tag team match	14:03
5	Carístico, Dragon Lee, and Místico defeated Los Guerreros Laguneros (Euforia, Gran Guerrero, and Niebla Roja)	Best two-out-of-three falls six-man tag team match	11:33
6	Último Guerrero (c) defeated Atlantis	Best two-out-of-three falls match for the NWA World Historic Middleweight Championship	11:41
(c) / – the champion(s) heading into the match

==== April 21 ====
No.	Results	Stipulations
1	Canelo Casas and Espanto Jr. defeated Flyer and Robin	Best two-out-of-three falls tag team match
2	Drone, Fuego, and Rey Cometa defeated Nitro and Los Cancerberos del Infierno (Raziel and Virus)	Best two-out-of-three falls six-man tag team match
3	Guerrero Maya Jr. defeated Luciferno	"Lighting match", 1 fall, 10 minute time limit
4	Sansón defeated Blue Panther Jr., Esfinge, Magnus, Stigma, Star Jr., Forastero, and Artillero	2017 La Copa Junior Nuevo Valores semifinal 8-man torneo cibernetico elimination match
5	Diamante Azul, Stuka Jr., and Valiente defeated Mr. Niebla, Pierroth, and Sam Adonis	Best two-out-of-three falls six-man tag team match
6	Carístico, Dragon Lee, and Volador Jr. defeated Bárbaro Cavernario, La Máscara, and Negro Casas by disqualification	Best two-out-of-three falls six-man tag team match

=== April 28 ===
No.	Results	Stipulations
1	Eléctrico and Fantasy defeated Pequeño Nitro and Pequeño Olímpico	Best two-out-of-three falls tag team match
2	Estrellita, La Metálica and Sanely defeated Dalys la Caribeña, Marcela and Zeuxis	Six-man "Lucha Libre rules" tag team match
3	Soberano Jr. defeated Sansón	2017 La Copa Junior Nuevo Valores tournament final
4	Diamante Azul, Marco Corleone and Valiente defeated Hechicero, Kráneo and Ripper	Six-man "Lucha Libre rules" tag team match
5	Carístico, Dragon Lee and Místico defeated La Peste Negra (Bárbaro Cavernario and Negro Casas) and Mephisto	Six-man "Lucha Libre rules" tag team match
6	La Máscara defeated Volador Jr.	Best two-out-of-three falls Singles match
