= La Copa Junior (2005) =

Mexican professional wrestling tournament

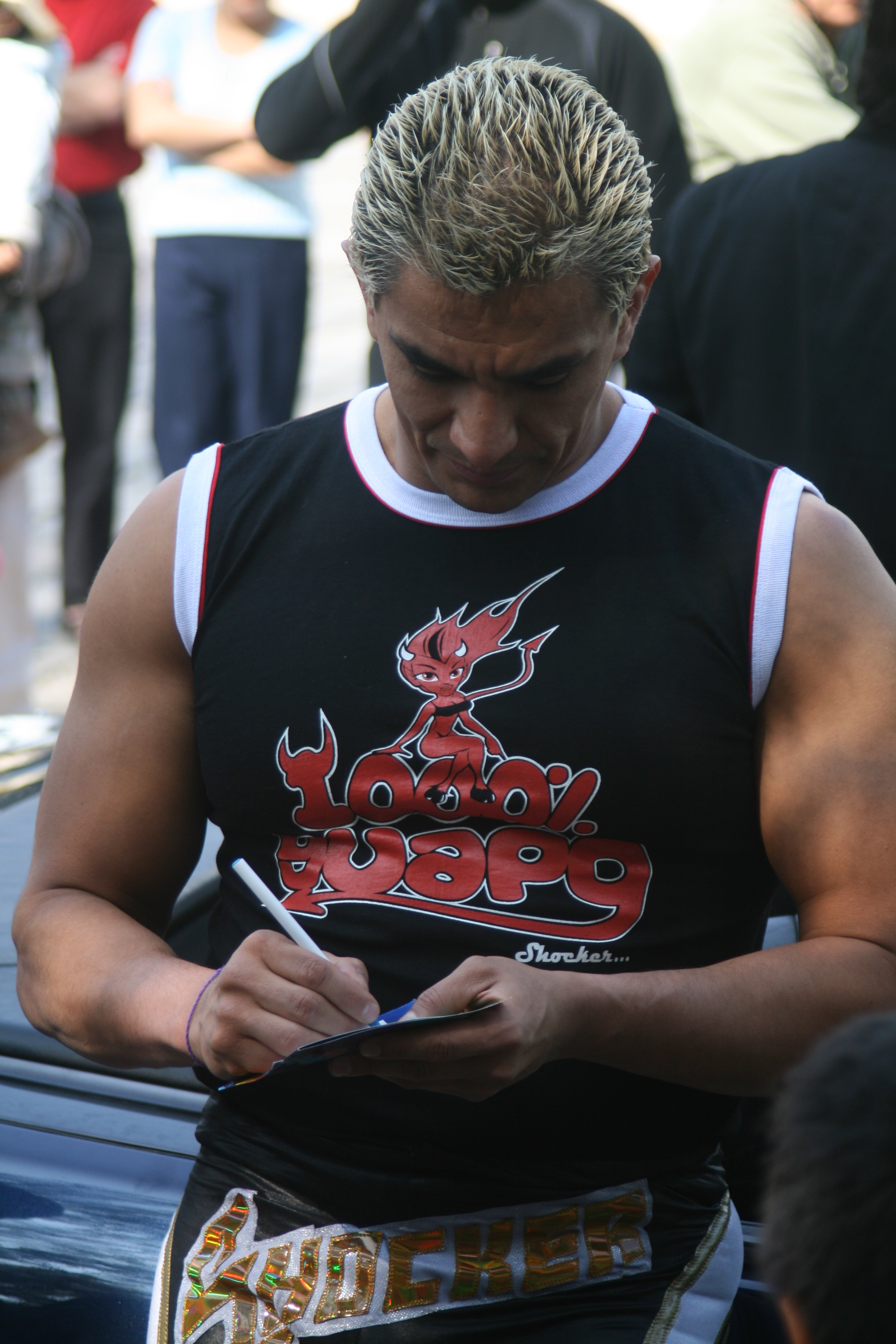
- Shocker, 2005 La Copa Junior winner
- Promotion: Consejo Mundial de Lucha Libre
- Date: January 28, 2005; February 4, 2005; February 11, 2005
- City: Mexico City, Mexico
- Venue: Arena México

Event chronology
← Previous; Sin Piedad	Next → Homenaje a Dos Leyendas

La Copa Junior chronology
← Previous; 1996	Next → 2006

La Copa Junior (2005) (Spanish for "The Junior Cup") was a professional wrestling tournament produced and scripted by the Mexican wrestling promotion Consejo Mundial de Lucha Libre (CMLLl; Spanish "World Wrestling Council"). The tournament ran from January 28, 2005 to February 11, 2005 in Arena México in Mexico City, Mexico. CMLL's recurring La Copa Junior tournament featured second, third or fourth generation wrestlers completing against each other. The 2005 version of the La Copa Junior was the second tournament held by CMLL.

The La Copa Junior tournament did not return until 2005 when CMLL revived the concept and presented it as an annual recurring tournament. Héctor Garza was originally supposed to work the tournament, but was unable to return to Mexico due to commitments in the United States of America and had to be replaced by Apolo Dantés. Olímpico was unable to compete due to a neck injury, forcing CMLL to replace him with Máscara Mágica and the 1996 winner Emilio Charles Jr. had to pull out of the tournament due to a hand injury, he was replaced by Brazo de Oro. The tournament came down to Dr. Wagner Jr. and Shocker facing off in the finals, with Shocker winning the whole tournament.

== Production ==
=== Background ===
Starting in 1996, the Mexican professional wrestling promotion Consejo Mundial de Lucha Libre ("World Wrestling Council"; CMLL) held their first ever La Copa Junior tournament. CMLL held the tournament to celebrate the fact that lucha libre in Mexico is often a family tradition, with a large number of second, third, or even fourth generation wrestlers following the footsteps of their relatives. The premise of the tournament is that all participants are second-generation or more, although at times the family relationship is a storylines family relationship and not an actual one. One example of this is Dragón Rojo Jr. being billed as the grandson of Dragón Rojo, when in reality that is simply a storyline created by CMLL. The original La Copa Junior was won by Héctor Garza.

CMLL would not hold another La Copa Junior until the 2005 tournament (won by Shocker), followed by a 2006 tournament won by Dos Caras Jr. The tournament did not return until 2010, where Dragón Rojo Jr. won the 2010 version. In 2012, third-generation luchador La Sombra won the Junior cup

In 2014, CMLL held two La Copa Junior tournaments, first a tournament on January 1, won by Super Halcón Jr., followed by a VIP tournament, featuring higher card wrestlers than the usual tournaments, which was won by Máximo The semi-regular tournament returned in 2016, won by Esfinge In 2017, Soberano Jr. won the La Copa Junior Nuevos Valores

=== Storylines ===
The tournament featured a number of professional wrestling matches with different wrestlers involved in pre-existing scripted feuds, plots and storylines. Wrestlers were portrayed as either heels (referred to as rudos in Mexico, those that portray the "bad guys") or faces (técnicos in Mexico, the "good guy" characters) as they followed a series of tension-building events, which culminated in a wrestling match or series of matches.

=== Family relationship ===
Wrestler	Family	Relationship	Ref(s).
Averno	Rudolfo Ruiz	Father	
Blue Demon Jr.	Blue Demon	Adopted father	
Brazo de Oro	Shadito Cruz	Father	
Brazo de Plata	Shadito Cruz	Father	
Negro Casas	Pepe Casas	Father	
Apolo Dantés	Alfonso Dantés	Father	
Dos Caras Jr.	Dos Caras	Father	
Alan Stone	El Greco	Father	
Dr. Wagner Jr.	Dr. Wagner	Father	
El Felino	Pepe Casas	Father	
Máscara Mágica	El Troyano	Father	
Misterioso Jr.	Misterioso	Uncle	
Rayo de Jalisco Jr.	Rayo de Jalisco Sr.	Father	
Shocker	Rubén Pato Soria	Father	
Volador Jr.	Volador / Super Parka	Father	

== Tournament ==
=== Brackets ===
First round
Alan Stone
Apolo Dantés	W
Averno
Negro Casas	W
Blue Demon Jr.	W
Misterioso Jr.
Brazo de Plata
Shocker	W
El Felino	W
Máscara Mágica
Dos Caras Jr.	W
Mephisto
Dr. Wagner Jr.	W
Volador Jr.
Rayo de Jalisco Jr.	W
Brazo de Oro

Quarter finals
Apolo Dantés	W
Negro Casas
Blue Demon Jr.
Shocker	W
El Felino	W
Dos Caras Jr.
Dr. Wagner Jr.	W
Rayo de Jalisco Jr.

Semi finals
Apolo Dantés
Shocker	W
El Felino
Dr. Wagner Jr.	W

Final
Shocker	W
Dr. Wagner Jr.

=== Results ===
==== January 21 ====
No.	Results	Stipulations
1	Koreano and Pólvora defeated Sombra de Plata and Valiente	Best two-out-of-three falls tag team match
2	Loco Max, Nitro, and Sangre Azteca defeated Neutrón, Tigre Blanco, and Virus	Best two-out-of-three falls six-man tag team match
3	Mephisto, Tarzan Boy, and Último Guerrero defeated Black Warrior, Místico, and El Sagrado	Best two-out-of-three falls six-man tag team match
4	Apolo Dantés defeated Alan Stone	2005 La Copa Junior first round match
5	Negro Casas defeated Averno by disqualification	2005 La Copa Junior first round match
6	Shocker defeated Brazo de Plata by count-out	2006 La Copa Junior first round match
7	Blue Demon Jr. defeated Misterioso II	2005 La Copa Junior first round match
8	Apolo Dantés defeated Negro Casas	2005 La Copa Junior quarterfinal match
9	Shocker defeated Blue Demon Jr.	2005 La Copa Junior quarterfinal match
10	Shocker defeated Apolo Dantés	2005 La Copa Junior semifinal match
11	Atlantis and Blue Panther (c) defeated Olímpico and Rey Bucanero	Best two-out-of-three falls tag team match for the CMLL World Tag Team Championship
(c) / – the champion(s) heading into the match

==== January 28 ====
No.	Results	Stipulations
1	Pequeño Olímpico and Último Dragóncito defeated Fire and Pierrothito	Best two-out-of-three falls tag team match
2	La Máscara, Misterioso II, and Virus defeated Dr. X, Hooligan, and Sangre Azteca by disqualification	Best two-out-of-three falls six-man tag team match
3	Apolo Dantés, El Satánico, and Universo 2000 defeated El Hijo del Perro Aguayo, El Hijo del Pierroth, and Pierroth	Best two-out-of-three falls six-man tag team match
4	El Felino defeated Máscara Mágica	2005 La Copa Junior first round match
5	Dos Caras Jr. defeated Mephisto	2005 La Copa Junior first round match
6	Dr. Wagner Jr. defeated Volador Jr.	2005 La Copa Junior first round match
7	Rayo de Jalisco Jr. defeated Brazo de Oro	2005 La Copa Junior first round match
8	Dos Caras Jr. defeated El Felino	2005 La Copa Junior quarterfinal match
9	Dr. Wagner Jr. defeated Rayo de Jalisco Jr.	2005 La Copa Junior quarterfinal match
10	Dr. Wagner Jr. defeated Dos Caras Jr.	2005 La Copa Junior semifinal match
11	Averno, Héctor Garza, Rey Bucanero, and Último Guerrero defeated Atlantis, Black Warrior, Místico, and Negro Casas	Best two-out-of-three falls eight-man tag team match

==== February 4 ====
No.	Results	Stipulations
1	Chris Stone, Texano Jr., and Tigre Metálico defeated Koreano, Ramstein, and Súper Comando	Best two-out-of-three falls six-man tag team match
2	El Felino, Safari, and Volador Jr. defeated Arkángel de la Muerte, Pierroth Jr., and Sangre Azteca	Best two-out-of-three falls six-man tag team match
3	Los Hermanos Dinamitas (Cien Caras, Máscara Año 2000, and Universo 2000) defeated El Hijo del Perro Aguayo, El Hijo del Pierroth, and Pierroth Jr. by disqualification	Best two-out-of-three falls six-man tag team match
4	L.A. Park, Máscara Sagrada, and Rayo de Jalisco Jr. defeated Apolo Dantés, Héctor Garza, and El Terrible	Best two-out-of-three falls six-man tag team match
5	Shocker defeated Dr. Wagner Jr.	2005 La Copa Junior finals match
