= La Copa Junior (2012) =

Mexican professional wrestling tournament

- Official poster from the preliminary round of the tournament
- Promotion: Consejo Mundial de Lucha Libre
- Date: November 30, 2012; December 7, 2012; December 14, 2012
- City: Mexico City, Mexico
- Venue: Arena México

Event chronology
← Previous; Infierno en el Ring	Next → Sin Piedad

La Copa Junior chronology
← Previous; 2010	Next → 2014

La Copa Junior (2012) (Spanish for "The Junior Cup") was a professional wrestling tournament produced and scripted by the Mexican wrestling promotion Consejo Mundial de Lucha Libre (CMLLl; Spanish "World Wrestling Council"). The tournament ran from November 30, 2012 to December 14, 2012, in Arena México in Mexico City, Mexico. CMLL's recurring La Copa Junior tournament featured second, third or fourth generation wrestlers completing against each other. The 2012 version of the La Copa Junior was the fifth tournament held by CMLL.

For the 2012 La Copa Junior tournament, CMLL chose to hold two qualifying 10-man torneo cibernetico elimination matches to determine the finalists. La Sombra won Block A by lastly eliminating Volador Jr., while Tama Tonga won Block B by eliminating Shocker to qualify for the finals. The finals of the tournament was the main event of the 2012 Sin Piedad supercard show and was won by La Sombra, two falls to one.

== Production ==
=== Background ===
Starting in 1996 the Mexican professional wrestling promotion Consejo Mundial de Lucha Libre ("World Wrestling Council"; CMLL) held their first ever La Copa Junior tournament. CMLL held the tournament to celebrate the fact that lucha libre in Mexico is often a family tradition, with a large number of second, third, or even fourth generation wrestlers following the footsteps of their relatives. The premise of the tournament is that all participants are second-generation or more, although at times the family relationship is a storylines family relationship and not an actual one. One example of this is Dragón Rojo Jr. being billed as the grandson of Dragón Rojo, when in reality that is simply a storyline created by CMLL. The original La Copa Junior was won by Héctor Garza.

CMLL would not hold another La Copa Junior until the 2005 tournament (won by Shocker), followed by a 2006 tournament won by Dos Caras Jr. The tournament did not return until 2010 where Dragón Rojo Jr. won the 2010 version. In 2012 third-generation luchador La Sombra won the Junior cup

In 2014, CMLL held two La Copa Junior tournaments, first a tournament on January 1, won by Super Halcón Jr., followed by a VIP tournament, featuring higher card wrestlers than the usual tournaments, which was won by Máximo The semi-regular tournament returned in 2016, won by Esfinge In 2017, Soberano Jr. won the La Copa Junior Nuevos Valores

=== Storylines ===
The tournament featured a number of professional wrestling matches with different wrestlers involved in pre-existing scripted feuds, plots and storylines. Wrestlers were portrayed as either heels (referred to as rudos in Mexico, those that portray the "bad guys") or faces (técnicos in Mexico, the "good guy" characters) as they followed a series of tension-building events, which culminated in a wrestling match or series of matches.

=== Family relationship ===
Wrestler	Family	Relationship	Group	Ref(s).
Ángel de Oro	Apolo Chávez	Father	Block A	
Brazo de Plata	Shadito Cruz	Father	Block B	
Negro Casas	Pepe Casas	Father	Block A	
Delta	Trueno	Father	Block A	
Dragón Rojo Jr.	Dragón Rojo	Storyline Grandfather	Block B	
El Felino	Pepe Casas	Father	Block B	
Guerrero Maya Jr.	Guerrero Maya / Black Terry	Father	Block B	
La Máscara	Brazo de Oro	Father	Block A	
Máscara Dorada	Gitano	Father	Block A	
Máximo	Brazo de Plata	Father	Block B	
Mephisto	Astro Rey	Father	Block A	
Misterioso Jr.	Misterioso	Uncle	Block B	
Olímpico	Roy Aguirre	Father	Block A	
Puma	El Felino	Father	Block B	
Shocker	Rubén Pato Soria	Father	Block B	
La Sombra	Brillante	Father	Block A	
Stuka Jr.	Stuka	Brother	Block B	
Tiger	El Felino	Father	Block A	
Tama Tonga	Haku	Father	Block B	
Volador Jr.	Volador / Super Parka	Father	Block A	

== Tournament ==
CMLL brought the La Copa Junior tournament back in late 2012, holding the tournament spread out over two CMLL Super Viernes shows and the finals as the main event of the 2012 Sin Piedad. The two qualifying rounds took place on the November 30, 2012 and the Super Viernes December 7, 2012. CMLL decided to change the tournament format for the 2012 version, instead adopting their normal tournament format, with two qualifying torneo cibernetico, multi-man elimination matches, with the winner of each match advancing to the finals. Each of the qualifying blocks consisted of 10 second-generation wrestlers for a total of 20 competitors over all, the highest number of competitors in any of the La Copa Junior tournaments. The first qualifying block was won by La Sombra, lastly eliminating his longtime rival Volador Jr. to earn his spot in the finals. The second qualifying block was won by New Japan Pro-Wrestling (NJPW) representative Tama Tonga as he eliminated Shocker to earn his spot in the finals. The final match was the only match contested under two out of three falls that saw La Sombra defeat Tama Tonga two falls to one to win the 2012 La Copa Junior tournament.

=== Order of elimination ===
Block A				Block B			
No.	Eliminated	By	Time	No.	Eliminated	By	Time
1	Delta	Tiger		1	Misterioso Jr.		04:20
2	Olímpico	La Máscara		2	Brazo de Plata	El Felino and Puma	08:47
3	Máscara Dorada	Mephisto		3	Stuka Jr.	Dragón Rojo Jr.	12:42
4	Tiger	Ángel de Oro		4	Puma	Shocker	
5	La Máscara	Volador Jr.		5	Guerrero Maya Jr.	Tama Tonga	
6	Mephisto	La Sombra		6	El Felino	Maximo	
7	Ángel de Oro	Negro Casas		7	Maximo	Dragón Rojo Jr. (Double disqualification)	20:20
8	Negro Casas	La Sombra		7	Dragón Rojo Jr.	Maximo (Double disqualification)	20:20
9	Volador Jr.	La Sombra		9	Shocker	Tama Tonga	26:50
10	Winner	La Sombra		10	Winner	Tama Tonga	26:50

=== Results ===
==== November 30 ====
No.	Results	Stipulations
1	Apocalipsis and Inquisidor defeated Leono and Robin	Best two-out-of-three falls tag team match
2	Metálico, Súper Halcón, Jr., and Tigre Blanco defeated Taurus and Los Hombres del Camoflaje (Artillero and Súper Comando) by disqualification	Best two-out-of-three falls six-man tag team match
3	Diamante, Rey Cometa, and El Sagrado defeated Puma, Sangre Azteca, and Vangelis	Best two-out-of-three falls six-man tag team match
4	La Sombra defeated Volador Jr., Negro Casas, Ángel de Oro, Mephisto, La Máscara, Tiger, Máscara Dorada, Olímpico, and Delta	2012 La Copa Junior, 10-man torneo cibernetico elimination match
5	Averno, Dragón Rojo Jr., and Rey Escorpión defeated Atlantis, Shocker, and Titán	Best two-out-of-three falls six-man tag team match

==== December 7 ====
No.	Results	Stipulations
1	Los Hombres del Camoflaje (Artillero and Súper Comando) defeated Metálico and Sensei	Best two-out-of-three falls tag team match
2	Arkángel de la Muerte, Hooligan, and Skándalo defeated Pegasso, Starman, and Súper Halcón, Jr.	Best two-out-of-three falls six-man tag team match
3	El Hijo del Fantasma, Rey Cometa, and Tritón defeated Namajague, Sangre Azteca, and Shigeo Okumura	Best two-out-of-three falls six-man tag team match
4	Tama Tonga defeated Shocker, Máximo, Brazo de Plata, Guerrero Maya Jr., Stuka Jr., Dragón Rojo Jr., El Felino, Misterioso Jr., and Puma	2012 La Copa Junior, 10-man torneo cibernetico elimination match
5	La Sombra defeated Último Guerrero	Best two-out-of-three falls match
6	Diamante Azul, Máscara Dorada, and Rush defeated Los Hijos del Averno (Averno, Ephesto, and Mephisto)	Best two-out-of-three falls six-man tag team match

==== December 14 ====
No.	Results	Stipulations	Times
1	Astral, Bam Bam and Fantasy defeated Demus 3:16, Pequeño Olímpico and Pierrothito	Best two-out-of-three falls six-man "Lucha Libre rules" tag team match	—
2	La Amapola and Las Ladies de Polanco (Princesa Blanca and Princesa Sujey) defeated Dark Angel, Estrellita and Silueta	Best two-out-of-three falls six-man "Lucha Libre rules" tag team match	—
3	Titán, Tritón and Valiente defeated La Peste Negra (El Felino and Negro Casas) and Puma	Best two-out-of-three falls six-man "Lucha Libre rules" tag team match	—
4	Averno defeated Máscara Dorada	Lightning match (One fall, 10-minute time-limit match)	—
5	El Terrible, Último Guerrero and Volador Jr. defeated Diamante Azul, Rush and Shocker	Best two-out-of-three falls six-man "Lucha Libre rules" tag team match	—
6	La Sombra (with Rush) defeated Tama Tonga (with El Terrible)	Singles match for the 2012 La Copa Junior Tournament Final	17:51
