= La Copa Junior (2014) =

Mexican professional wrestling tournament

- Official poster for the 2014 event
- Promotion: Consejo Mundial de Lucha Libre
- Date: January 1, 2014
- City: Mexico City, Mexico
- Venue: Arena México

Event chronology
← Previous; Leyenda de Plata	Next → Pequeño Reyes del Aire

La Copa Junior chronology
← Previous; 2012	Next → 2014 VIP

La Copa Junior (2014) (Spanish for "The Junior Cup") was a professional wrestling tournament produced and scripted by the Mexican wrestling promotion Consejo Mundial de Lucha Libre (CMLLl; Spanish "World Wrestling Council"). The tournament was held on January 1, 2014 in Arena México in Mexico City, Mexico. CMLL's recurring La Copa Junior tournament featured second, third or fourth generation wrestlers completing against each other. The 2014 version of the La Copa Junior was the sixth tournament held by CMLL. The 2014 tournament was a 12-man torneo cibernetico elimination match and saw Super Halcón Jr. emerge victorious over eleven other wrestlers.

== Production ==
=== Background ===
Starting in 1996 the Mexican professional wrestling promotion Consejo Mundial de Lucha Libre ("World Wrestling Council"; CMLL) held their first ever La Copa Junior tournament. CMLL held the tournament to celebrate the fact that lucha libre in Mexico is often a family tradition, with a large number of second, third, or even fourth generation wrestlers following the footsteps of their relatives. The premise of the tournament is that all participants are second-generation or more, although at times the family relationship is a storylines family relationship and not an actual one. One example of this is Dragón Rojo Jr. being billed as the grandson of Dragón Rojo, when in reality that is simply a storyline created by CMLL. The original La Copa Junior was won by Héctor Garza.

CMLL would not hold another La Copa Junior until the 2005 tournament (won by Shocker), followed by a 2006 tournament won by Dos Caras Jr. The tournament did not return until 2010 where Dragón Rojo Jr. won the 2010 version. In 2012 third-generation luchador La Sombra won the Junior cup

In 2014, CMLL held two La Copa Junior tournaments, first a tournament on January 1, won by Super Halcón Jr., followed by a VIP tournament, featuring higher card wrestlers than the usual tournaments, which was won by Máximo The semi-regular tournament returned in 2016, won by Esfinge In 2017, Soberano Jr. won the La Copa Junior Nuevos Valores

=== Storylines ===
The tournament featured a number of professional wrestling matches with different wrestlers involved in pre-existing scripted feuds, plots and storylines. Wrestlers were portrayed as either heels (referred to as rudos in Mexico, those that portray the "bad guys") or faces (técnicos in Mexico, the "good guy" characters) as they followed a series of tension-building events, which culminated in a wrestling match or series of matches.

=== Family relationship ===
Wrestler	Family	Relationship	Ref(s).
Black Panther	Blue Panther	Father	
Cachorro	Blue Panther	Father	
Canelo Casas	Pepe Casas	Grandfather	
Dragon Lee	Toro Blanco	Father	
Guerrero Negro Jr.	Guerrero Negro II	Father	
Herodes Jr.	Herodes	Father	
El Hijo del Signo	El Signo	Father	
Hombre Bala Jr.	Hombre Bala	Father	
Oro Jr.	Plata	Father	
Robin	Robin Hood/Brazo Cibernético	Father	
Stigma	Panico	Father	
Super Halcón Jr.	Super Halcón	Father	

== Tournament ==
=== Order of elimination ===
#	Eliminated	Eliminated by
1	Robin	Hijo del Signo
2	Herodes Jr.	Dragon Lee II
3	Dragon Lee II	Cachorro
4	Hijo del Signo	Super Halcón Jr.
5	Oro Jr.	Guerrero Negro Jr.
5	Black Panther	Stigma
7	Stigma	Canelo Casas
8	Cachorro	Super Halcón Jr.
9	Hombre Bala Jr.	Guerrero Negro Jr.
10	Guerrero Negro Jr.	Super Halcón Jr.
11	Canelo Casas	Super Halcón Jr.
12	Winner	Super Halcón Jr.

=== Results ===
No.	Results	Stipulations
1	Mercurio and Pequeño Olímpico defeated Acero and Aéreo	Best two-out-of-three falls tag team match
2	Puma, Raziel, and Sangre Azteca defeated Pegasso, El Sagrado, and Sensei	Best two-out-of-three falls six-man tag team match
3	Súper Halcón Jr. defeated Hombre Bala Jr., Dragon Lee, Oro Jr., Stigma, Robin, Guerrero Negro Jr., Canelo Casas, Black Panther, El Hijo del Signo, Cachorro, and Herodes Jr.	2014 La Copa Junior, 12-man torneo cibernetico elimination match
4	La Peste Negra (El Felino, Mr. Niebla, and Negro Casas) defeated La Máscara, Máximo, and Valiente	Best two-out-of-three falls six-man tag team match
5	Mephisto (c) defeated Atlantis	Best two-out-of-three falls match for the Mexican National Light Heavyweight Championship
(c) / – the champion(s) heading into the match
