= La Copa Junior VIP (2014) =

Mexican professional wrestling tournament

- The official poster for Block B of the La Copa VIP tournament. Note that this listed Brazo de Plata as a participant, but he was replaced by Ángel de Oro.
- Promotion: Consejo Mundial de Lucha Libre
- Date: September 29, 2014; October 3, 2014; October 10, 2014
- City: Mexico City, Mexico
- Venue: Arena México

Event chronology
← Previous; CMLL 81st Anniversary Show	Next → Día de Muertos

La Copa Junior chronology
← Previous; 2014	Next → 2016

La Copa Junior VIP (2014) (Spanish for "The Junior Cup") was a professional wrestling tournament produced and scripted by the Mexican wrestling promotion Consejo Mundial de Lucha Libre (CMLLl; Spanish "World Wrestling Council"). The tournament ran from September 29, 2014, to October 10, 2014, in Arena México in Mexico City, Mexico. CMLL's recurring La Copa Junior tournament featured second, third, or fourth-generation wrestlers competing against each other. The 2014 La Copa Junior VIP was the seventh tournament held by CMLL and the only year that CMLL held two La Copa Junior tournaments.

Sixteen second-generation wrestlers participated in a single-elimination tournament, with the first, quarterfinal and semifinal matches being contested under single falls rules, while the final was a best two-out-of-three falls match. The tournament saw Máximo, son of Brazo de Plata, defeat Mephisto, son of Astro Rey, to win the 2014 La Copa Junior VIP.

== Production ==
=== Background ===
Starting in 1996 the Mexican professional wrestling promotion Consejo Mundial de Lucha Libre ("World Wrestling Council"; CMLL) held their first ever La Copa Junior tournament. CMLL held the tournament to celebrate the fact that lucha libre in Mexico is often a family tradition, with a large number of second, third, or even fourth generation wrestlers following the footsteps of their relatives. The premise of the tournament is that all participants are second-generation or more, although at times the family relationship is a storylines family relationship and not an actual one. One example of this is Dragón Rojo Jr. being billed as the grandson of Dragón Rojo, when in reality that is simply a storyline created by CMLL. The original La Copa Junior was won by Héctor Garza.

CMLL would not hold another La Copa Junior until the 2005 tournament (won by Shocker), followed by a 2006 tournament won by Dos Caras Jr. The tournament did not return until 2010 where Dragón Rojo Jr. won the 2010 version. In 2012 third-generation luchador La Sombra won the Junior cup

In 2014, CMLL held two La Copa Junior tournaments, first a tournament on January 1, won by Super Halcón Jr., followed by a VIP tournament, featuring higher card wrestlers than the usual tournaments, which was won by Máximo The semi-regular tournament returned in 2016, won by Esfinge In 2017, Soberano Jr. won the La Copa Junior Nuevos Valores

=== Storylines ===
The tournament featured a number of professional wrestling matches with different wrestlers involved in pre-existing scripted feuds, plots and storylines. Wrestlers were portrayed as either heels (referred to as rudos in Mexico, those that portray the "bad guys") or faces (técnicos in Mexico, the "good guy" characters) as they followed a series of tension-building events, which culminated in a wrestling match or series of matches.

=== Family relationship ===
Wrestler	Family	Relationship	Ref(s).
Ángel de Oro	Apolo Chávez	Father	
Delta	Trueno	Father	
Euforia	El Soberano	Father	
Guerrero Maya Jr.	Guerrero Maya / Black Terry	Father	
El Felino	Pepe Casas	Father	
La Máscara	Brazo de Oro	Father	
Máximo	Brazo de Plata	Father	
Mephisto	Astro Rey / Kahos	Father	
Misterioso Jr.	Misterioso	Uncle	
Puma	El Felino	Father	
Rush	Arthur Muñoz	Father	
Shocker	Rubén Soria	Father	
La Sombra	Briliante	Father	
Stuka Jr.	Stuka	Brother	
Tiger	El Felino	Father	
Volador Jr.	Volador / Super Parka	Father	

== Tournament ==
The La Copa Junior VIP tournament started on September 26, 2014 with half of the competitors facing off to determine the first finalist with Mephisto defeating Misterioso Jr., Shocker and finally Volador Jr. to earn a spot in the finals. Brazo de Plata was originally scheduled to take part in the tournament, but was replaced by Ángel de Oro without any official explanation. The second qualifying block took place on October 3 to determine the second finalist. In the second round Los Ingobernables teammates La Sombra and Rush faced off after both won their first round match. To the surprise of everyone, and contrary to statements made before the tournament, the two decided not to fight each other at all and Rush gave the win to La Sombra. La Sombra faced Máximo in the block finals after Máximo defeated Puma and Stuka Jr. on his way to the finals. In the finals La Sombra was disqualified for kicking Máximo in the groin, costing him the match and allowing Máximo to advance to the tournament finals. Euforia was the only competitor in the 2014 VIP tournament to have never competed in the La Copa Junior tournament before, despite it being openly acknowledge that he was the son of the original El Soberano, his son, the current Soberano, had not participated in a La Copa Junior tournament either at that point. On October 10 Máximo defeated Mephisto to win his first ever La Copa Junior tournament.

=== Brackets ===
First round
Mephisto	W
Guerrero Maya Jr.
Shocker	W
Misterioso Jr.
Volador Jr.	W
Tiger
La Máscara	W
El Felino
Stuka Jr.	W
Delta
Puma
Máximo	W
La Sombra	W
Ángel de Oro
Rush	W
Euforia

Quarter finals
Mephisto	W
Shocker
Volador Jr.	W
La Máscara
Stuka Jr.
Máximo	W
La Sombra	W
Rush

Semi finals
Mephisto	W
Volador Jr.
Máximo	W
La Sombra

Final
Mephisto
Máximo	W

=== Results ===
==== September 29 ====
No.	Results	Stipulations
1	Canelo Casas and Nitro defeated Esfinge and Oro Jr.	Best two-out-of-three falls tag team match
2	Boby Zavala, Okumura, and Virus defeated Dragon Lee, Fuego, and Tritón by disqualification	Best two-out-of-three falls six-man tag team match
3	La Sombra, Marco Corleone, and Stuka Jr. defeated Kráneo, Mr. Águila, and Rey Bucanero	Best two-out-of-three falls six-man tag team match
4	El Felino and La Máscara defeated Shocker, Mephisto, Guerrero Maya Jr., Misterioso Jr., Tiger, and Volador Jr.	2014 La Copa Junior VIP seeding battle royal
5	Mephisto defeated Guerrero Maya Jr.	2014 La Copa Junior VIP first round match
6	Shocker defeated Misterioso Jr.	2014 La Copa Junior VIP first round match
7	Volador Jr. defeated Tiger	2014 La Copa Junior VIP first round match
8	La Máscara defeated El Felino	2014 La Copa Junior VIP first round match
9	Mephisto defeated Shocker	2014 La Copa Junior VIP quarterfinal match
10	Volador Jr. defeated La Máscara	2014 La Copa Junior VIP quarterfinal match
11	Mephisto defeated Volador Jr.	2014 La Copa Junior VIP semifinal match
12	Mr. Niebla, Negro Casas, and Último Guerrero defeated Atlantis, Máscara Dorada, and Valiente	Best two-out-of-three falls six-man tag team match

==== October 3 ====
No.	Results	Stipulations
1	Demus 3:16 and Pierrothito defeated Astral and Stukita	Best two-out-of-three falls tag team match
2	Cachorro, Dragon Lee, and Fuego defeated Los Cancerberos del Infierno (Cancerbero, Raziel, and Virus)	Best two-out-of-three falls six-man tag team match
3	Dark Angel, Goya Kong, and Marcela defeated La Amapola, Dalys la Caribeña, and Zeuxis	Best two-out-of-three falls six-man tag team match
4	Kráneo, Mr. Águila, and El Terrible defeated Máscara Dorada, Titán, and Valiente	Best two-out-of-three falls six-man tag team match
5	Euforia and Rush defeated La Sombra, Brazo de Plata, Máximo, Puma, Delta, and Stuka Jr.	2014 La Copa Junior VIP seeding battle royal
6	Stuka Jr. defeated Delta	2014 La Copa Junior VIP first round match
7	Máximo defeated Puma	2014 La Copa Junior VIP first round match
8	La Sombra defeated Ángel de Oro	2014 La Copa Junior VIP first round match
9	Rush defeated Euforia	2014 La Copa Junior VIP first round match
10	Máximo defeated Stuka Jr.	2014 La Copa Junior VIP quarterfinal match
11	La Sombra defeated Rush	2014 La Copa Junior VIP quarterfinal match
12	Máximo defeated La Sombra by disqualification	2014 La Copa Junior VIP semifinal match
13	Mephisto, Thunder, and Último Guerrero defeated Diamante Azul, La Máscara, and Volador Jr.	Best two-out-of-three falls six-man tag team match

==== October 10 ====
No.	Results	Stipulations
1	Akuma and Disturbio defeated Robin and Soberano Jr.	Best two-out-of-three falls tag team match
2	Misterioso Jr., Skándalo, and Virus defeated Black Panther, Pegasso, and Tritón	Best two-out-of-three falls six-man tag team match
3	Ángel de Oro, Delta, and Rey Cometa defeated Ephesto, El Felino, and Hechicero	Best two-out-of-three falls six-man tag team match
4	Diamante Azul, Marco Corleone, and Valiente defeated Kráneo, Mr. Niebla, and Shocker	Best two-out-of-three falls six-man tag team match
5	Máximo defeated Mephisto	2014 La Copa Junior VIP final match
6	Los Ingobernables (La Máscara, La Sombra, and Rush) defeated Los Guerreros del Infierno (Euforia, Thunder, and Último Guerrero)	Best two-out-of-three falls six-man tag team match
