= La Copa Junior (2010) =

Mexican professional wrestling tournament

- Poster for the finals of the 2010 La Copa Junior
- Promotion: Consejo Mundial de Lucha Libre
- Date: December 10, 2010; December 17, 2010; December 25, 2010
- City: Mexico City, Mexico
- Venue: Arena México

Event chronology
← Previous; Sin Piedad	Next → Reyes del Aire

La Copa Junior chronology
← Previous; 2006	Next → 2012

La Copa Junior (2010) (Spanish for "The Junior Cup") was a professional wrestling tournament produced and scripted by the Mexican wrestling promotion Consejo Mundial de Lucha Libre (CMLLl; Spanish "World Wrestling Council"). The tournament ran from December 10, 2010 to December 25, 2010 in Arena México in Mexico City, Mexico. CMLL's recurring La Copa Junior tournament featured second, third or fourth generation wrestlers completing against each other. The 2010 version of the La Copa Junior was the fourth tournament held by CMLL.

After not being promoted for three years CMLL brought La Copa Junior back as a late in the year tournament. The tournament included 20 wrestlers, four more than the other tournaments. the tournament was split into 2 blocks of 10 wrestlers, with a seeding Battle royal, where the final two wrestlers in the ring would only have to win one match to get into the semifinal, while everyone else in the block would have to win three. Dragón Rojo Jr. won Block A while Averno won block B. In the end Dragón Rojo Jr. won the final by disqualification.

== Production ==
=== Background ===
Starting in 1996 the Mexican professional wrestling promotion Consejo Mundial de Lucha Libre ("World Wrestling Council"; CMLL) held their first ever La Copa Junior tournament. CMLL held the tournament to celebrate the fact that lucha libre in Mexico is often a family tradition, with a large number of second, third, or even fourth generation wrestlers following the footsteps of their relatives. The premise of the tournament is that all participants are second-generation or more, although at times the family relationship is a storylines family relationship and not an actual one. One example of this is Dragón Rojo Jr. being billed as the grandson of Dragón Rojo, when in reality that is simply a storyline created by CMLL. The original La Copa Junior was won by Héctor Garza.

CMLL would not hold another La Copa Junior until the 2005 tournament (won by Shocker), followed by a 2006 tournament won by Dos Caras Jr. The tournament did not return until 2010 where Dragón Rojo Jr. won the 2010 version. In 2012 third-generation luchador La Sombra won the Junior cup

In 2014, CMLL held two La Copa Junior tournaments, first a tournament on January 1, won by Super Halcón Jr., followed by a VIP tournament, featuring higher card wrestlers than the usual tournaments, which was won by Máximo The semi-regular tournament returned in 2016, won by Esfinge In 2017, Soberano Jr. won the La Copa Junior Nuevos Valores

=== Storylines ===
The tournament featured a number of professional wrestling matches with different wrestlers involved in pre-existing scripted feuds, plots and storylines. Wrestlers were portrayed as either heels (referred to as rudos in Mexico, those that portray the "bad guys") or faces (técnicos in Mexico, the "good guy" characters) as they followed a series of tension-building events, which culminated in a wrestling match or series of matches.

=== Family relationship ===
Wrestler	Family	Relationship	Ref(s).
Ángel de Oro	Apolo Chávez	Father	
Averno	Rudolfo Ruiz	Father	
Brazo de Plata	Shadito Cruz	Father	
Negro Casas	Pepe Casas	Father	
Delta	Trueno	Father	
Dragón Rojo Jr.	Dragón Rojo	Storyline Grandfather	
El Felino	Pepe Casas	Father	
Héctor Garza	Humberto Garza	Father	
Hijo del Fantasma	El Fantasma	Father	
La Máscara	Brazo de Oro	Father	
La Sombra	Brilliante	Father	
Máximo	Brazo de Plata	Father	
Mephisto	Astro Rey / Kahoz	Father	
Olímpico	Roy Aguirre	Father	
Rush	Toro Blanco	Father	
Shocker	Rubén Pato Soria	Father	
El Texano Jr.	El Texano	Father	
Volador Jr.	Volador / Super Parka	Father	

== Tournament ==
After not being promoted for three years CMLL brought La Copa Junior back as a late in the year tournament. The tournament included 20 wrestlers, four more than the other tournaments. the tournament was split into 2 blocks of 10 wrestlers, with a seeding Battle royal, where the final two wrestlers in the ring would only have to win one match to get into the semifinal, while everyone else in the block would have to win three. Block A, which took place on the December 10, 2010 Super Viernes show and had Dragón Rojo Jr. overcome the odds and defeat four wrestlers in a row to earn a spot in the final match. Rojo Jr. defeated Máximo, La Mascara, La Sombra and Volador Jr. Block B took place on the December 17, 2010 Super Viernes and saw Averno take advantage of the "short cut" as he defeated the other Battle royal survivor El Hijo del Fantasma to advance to the semifinal where he pinned longtime rival Místico to earn his spot in the tournament final.

The finals of the La Copa Junior tournament took place on a special Saturday night event on December 25, 2010. The end came after a distraction by Averno's cornerman Mephisto led Averno to land a low blow on Dragón Rojo Jr., only for the ruse to backfire on him as the referee saw the illegal move and disqualified Averno, making Dragón Rojo Jr. the 2010 La Copa Junior winner.

=== Brackets ===
First round
La Sombra	W
Mephisto
Olímpico	W
Rush
La Máscara	W
El Felino
Dragón Rojo Jr.	W
Máximo
El Texano Jr.	W
Brazo de Plata
Negro Casas	W
Ángel de Oro
Héctor Garza	W
Delta
Místico	W
Misterioso Jr.

Second round
Volador Jr.
Battle Royal bye
Shocker
Battle Royal bye
La Sombra	W
Olímpico
La Máscara
Dragón Rojo Jr.	W
Averno
Battle Royal bye
Hijo del Fantasma
Battle Royal bye
El Texano Jr.
Negro Casas	W
Héctor Garza
Místico	W

Quarter finals
Volador Jr.	W
Shocker
La Sombra
Dragón Rojo Jr.	W
Averno	W
Hijo del Fantasma
Negro Casas
Místico	W

Semi finals
Volador Jr.
Dragón Rojo Jr.	W
Averno	W
Místico

Final
Dragón Rojo Jr.	W
Averno

=== Results ===
==== December 10 ====
No.	Results	Stipulations
1	Hooligan and Mortiz defeated Ángel de Plata and Guerrero Maya Jr.	Best two-out-of-three falls tag team match
2	Delta, Fuego, and Stuka Jr. defeated Euforia, Pólvora, and Sangre Azteca	Best two-out-of-three falls six-man tag team match
3	Volador Jr. defeated Shocker	2010 La Copa Junior, quarterfinal match
4	Olímpico defeated Rush	2010 La Copa Junior, first round match
5	La Sombra defeated Mephisto	2010 La Copa Junior, first round match
6	Dragón Rojo Jr. defeated Máximo	2010 La Copa Junior, first round match
7	La Máscara defeated El Felino	2010 La Copa Junior, first round match
8	La Sombra defeated Olímpico	2010 La Copa Junior, second round match
9	Dragón Rojo Jr. defeated La Máscara	2010 La Copa Junior, second round match
10	Dragón Rojo Jr. defeated La Sombra	2010 La Copa Junior, quarterfinal match
11	Dragón Rojo Jr. defeated Volador Jr.	2010 La Copa Junior, semifinal match
12	Latin ♥, Místico, and Strong Man defeated Héctor Garza, Mr. Águila, and El Terrible	Best two-out-of-three falls six-man tag team match

==== December 17 ====
No.	Results	Stipulations
1	Disturbio and Semental defeated Metálico and Molotov	Best two-out-of-three falls tag team match
2	Ángel Azteca Jr., Diamante, and El Sagrado defeated Los Cancerberos del Infierno (Cancerbero, Raziel, and Virus)	Best two-out-of-three falls six-man tag team match
3	Averno defeated El Hijo del Fantasma	2010 La Copa Junior, quarterfinal match
4	Texano Jr. defeated Brazo de Oro	2010 La Copa Junior, first round match
5	Negro Casas defeated Ángel de Oro	2010 La Copa Junior, first round match
6	Héctor Garza defeated Delta	2010 La Copa Junior, first round match
7	Místico defeated Misterioso II	2010 La Copa Junior, first round match
8	Negro Casas defeated Texano Jr.	2010 La Copa Junior, second round match
9	Místico defeated Héctor Garza	2010 La Copa Junior, second round match
10	Místico defeated Negro Casas	2010 La Copa Junior, quarterfinal match
11	Averno defeated Místico	2010 La Copa Junior, semifinal match
12	La Sombra, Máscara Dorada, and Shocker defeated Mr. Águila, Olímpico, and Psicosis	Best two-out-of-three falls six-man tag team match

==== December 25 ====
No.	Results	Stipulations
1	Höruz and Robin defeated Bronco and Inquisidor	Best two-out-of-three falls tag team match
2	Pequeño Nitro, Pequeño Olímpico, and Pequeño Black Warrior defeated Eléctrico, Fantasy, and Shockercito	Best two-out-of-three falls six-man tag team match
3	El Hijo del Fantasma, El Sagrado, and Valiente defeated Ephesto, Mephisto, and Sangre Azteca by disqualification	Best two-out-of-three falls six-man tag team match
4	Dragón Rojo Jr. defeated Averno by disqualification	2010 La Copa Junior, final match
5	Blue Panther, La Máscara, and Místico defeated Atlantis, El Terrible, and Texano Jr.	Best two-out-of-three falls six-man tag team match
