= La Copa Junior (2006) =

Mexican professional wrestling tournament

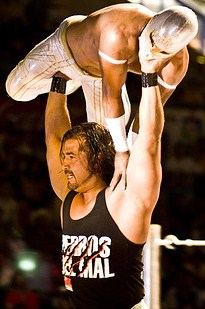
- Héctor Garza (bottom), finalist in the 2006 tournament.
- Promotion: Consejo Mundial de Lucha Libre
- Date: March 21, 2006
- City: Mexico City, Mexico
- Venue: Arena México

Event chronology
← Previous; Homenaje a Dos Leyendas	Next →: 50. Aniversario de Arena México

La Copa Junior chronology
← Previous; 2005	Next → 2010

La Copa Junior (2006) (Spanish for "The Junior Cup") was a professional wrestling tournament produced and scripted by the Mexican wrestling promotion Consejo Mundial de Lucha Libre (CMLLl; Spanish "World Wrestling Council"). The tournament took place on March 21, 2006 in Arena México in Mexico City, Mexico. CMLL's recurring La Copa Junior tournament featured second, third or fourth generation wrestlers completing against each other. The 2006 version of the La Copa Junior was the third tournament held by CMLL. Due to the fact that all 15 matches took place in one night all matches were under 10 minutes in length. The finals had Dos Caras Jr. defeat Héctor Garza.

== Production ==
=== Background ===
Starting in 1996 the Mexican professional wrestling promotion Consejo Mundial de Lucha Libre ("World Wrestling Council"; CMLL) held their first ever La Copa Junior tournament. CMLL held the tournament to celebrate the fact that lucha libre in Mexico is often a family tradition, with a large number of second, third, or even fourth generation wrestlers following the footsteps of their relatives. The premise of the tournament is that all participants are second-generation or more, although at times the family relationship is a storylines family relationship and not an actual one. One example of this is Dragón Rojo Jr. being billed as the grandson of Dragón Rojo, when in reality that is simply a storyline created by CMLL. The original La Copa Junior was won by Héctor Garza.

CMLL would not hold another La Copa Junior until the 2005 tournament (won by Shocker), followed by a 2006 tournament won by Dos Caras Jr. The tournament did not return until 2010 where Dragón Rojo Jr. won the 2010 version. In 2012 third-generation luchador La Sombra won the Junior cup

In 2014, CMLL held two La Copa Junior tournaments, first a tournament on January 1, won by Super Halcón Jr., followed by a VIP tournament, featuring higher card wrestlers than the usual tournaments, which was won by Máximo The semi-regular tournament returned in 2016, won by Esfinge In 2017, Soberano Jr. won the La Copa Junior Nuevos Valores

=== Storylines ===
The tournament featured a number of professional wrestling matches with different wrestlers involved in pre-existing scripted feuds, plots and storylines. Wrestlers were portrayed as either heels (referred to as rudos in Mexico, those that portray the "bad guys") or faces (técnicos in Mexico, the "good guy" characters) as they followed a series of tension-building events, which culminated in a wrestling match or series of matches.

=== Family relationship ===
Wrestler	Family	Relationship	Ref(s).
Perro Aguayo Jr.	Perro Aguayo	Father	
Averno	Rudolfo Ruiz	Father	
Brazo de Plata	Shadito Cruz	Father	
Negro Casas	Pepe Casas	Father	
Apolo Dantés	Alfonso Dantés	Father	
Dr. Wagner Jr.	Dr. Wagner	Father	
Dos Caras Jr.	Dos Caras	Father	
Héctor Garza	Humberto Garza	Father	
Heavy Metal	Pepe Casas	Father	
Lizmark Jr.	Lizmark	Father	
La Máscara	Brazo de Oro	Father	
Máscara Mágica	El Troyano	Father	
Mephisto	Astro Rey / Kahoz	Father	
Misterioso Jr.	Misterioso	Uncle	
Olímpico	Roy Aguirre	Father	
Volador Jr.	Volador / Super Parka	Father	

== Tournament ==
=== Brackets ===
First round
Averno
Perro Aguayo Jr.	W
Dr. Wagner Jr.	W
Mephisto
Dos Caras Jr.	W
Heavy Metal
La Máscara
Apolo Dantés	W
Héctor Garza	W
Brazo de Plata
Máscara Mágica
Lizmark Jr.	W
Volador Jr.
Olímpico	W
Misterioso Jr.
Negro Casas	W

Quarter finals
Perro Aguayo Jr.
Dr. Wagner Jr.	W
Dos Caras Jr.	W
Apolo Dantés
Héctor Garza	W
Lizmark Jr.
Olímpico	W
Negro Casas

Semi finals
Dr. Wagner Jr.
Dos Caras Jr.	W
Héctor Garza	W
Olímpico

Final
Dos Caras Jr.	W
Héctor Garza

=== Results ===
No.	Results	Stipulations
1	Arkángel de la Muerte, Hombre Sin Nombre, and Shigeo Okumura defeated Máscara Púrpura, Neutrón, and Virus	Best two-out-of-three falls six-man tag team match
2	Dark Angel, Diana La Cazadora, and Princesa Blanca defeated La Amapola, Medussa, and Princesa Sugehit	Best two-out-of-three falls six-man tag team match
3	Pierroth, Takemura, and Tarzan Boy defeated Blue Panther, El Satánico, and Último Dragón	Best two-out-of-three falls six-man tag team match
4	El Hijo del Perro Aguayo defeated Averno	2006 La Copa Junior first round match
5	Dr. Wagner Jr. defeated Mephisto	2006 La Copa Junior first round match
6	Dos Caras Jr. defeated Heavy Metal	2006 La Copa Junior first round match
7	Apolo Dantes defeated La Máscara	2006 La Copa Junior first round match
8	Héctor Garza defeated Brazo de Plata	2006 La Copa Junior first round match
9	El Hijo del Lizmark defeated Máscara Mágica	2006 La Copa Junior first round match
10	Olímpico defeated Volador Jr.	2006 La Copa Junior first round match
11	Negro Casas defeated Misterioso Jr.	2006 La Copa Junior first round match
12	Dr. Wagner Jr. defeated El Hijo del Perro Aguayo	2006 La Copa Junior quarter-final match
13	Dos Caras Jr. defeated Apolo Dantes	2006 La Copa Junior quarter-final match
14	Héctor Garza defeated El Hijo del Lizmark	2006 La Copa Junior quarter-final match
15	Olímpico defeated Negro Casas	2006 La Copa Junior quarter-final match
16	Dos Caras Jr. defeated Dr. Wagner Jr.	2006 La Copa Junior semi-final match
17	Héctor Garza defeated Olímpico	2006 La Copa Junior semi-final match
18	Dos Caras Jr. defeated Héctor Garza	2006 La Copa Junior final match
19	Místico defeated Black Warrior	Best two-out-of-three falls match
