= La Copa Junior (1996) =

Mexican professional wrestling tournament

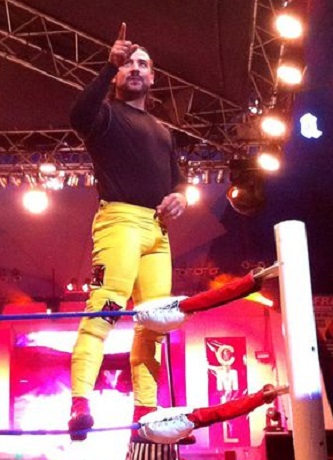
- Héctor Garza, winner of the first La Copa Junior
- Promotion: Consejo Mundial de Lucha Libre
- Date: February 23, 1996; March 1, 1996
- City: Mexico City, Mexico
- Venue: Arena México

Event chronology
← Previous; Juicio Final	Next → Homenaje a Salvador Lutteroth

La Copa Junior chronology
← Previous; First	Next → 2005

La Copa Junior (1996) (Spanish for "The Junior Cup") was a professional wrestling tournament produced and scripted by the Mexican wrestling promotion Consejo Mundial de Lucha Libre (CMLLl; Spanish "World Wrestling Council"). The tournament ran from February 23, 1996 to March 1, 1996 in Arena México in Mexico City, Mexico. CMLL's recurring La Copa Junior tournament featured second, third or fourth generation wrestlers completing against each other. The 1996 version of the La Copa Junior was the first held by CMLL. The first show featured the opening round of the tournament, while the second show featured the Quarter finals, semifinals and the finals of the tournament. Héctor Garza defeated Emilio Charles Jr. in the final to win the La Copa Junior.

== Production ==
=== Background ===
Starting in 1996 the Mexican professional wrestling promotion Consejo Mundial de Lucha Libre ("World Wrestling Council"; CMLL) held their first ever La Copa Junior tournament. CMLL held the tournament to celebrate the fact that lucha libre in Mexico is often a family tradition, with a large number of second, third, or even fourth generation wrestlers following the footsteps of their relatives. The premise of the tournament is that all participants are second-generation or more, although at times the family relationship is a storylines family relationship and not an actual one. One example of this is Dragón Rojo Jr. being billed as the grandson of Dragón Rojo, when in reality that is simply a storyline created by CMLL. The original La Copa Junior was won by Héctor Garza.

CMLL would not hold another La Copa Junior until the 2005 tournament (won by Shocker), followed by a 2006 tournament won by Dos Caras Jr. The tournament did not return until 2010 where Dragón Rojo Jr. won the 2010 version. In 2012 third-generation luchador La Sombra won the Junior cup

In 2014, CMLL held two La Copa Junior tournaments, first a tournament on January 1, won by Super Halcón Jr., followed by a VIP tournament, featuring higher card wrestlers than the usual tournaments, which was won by Máximo The semi-regular tournament returned in 2016, won by Esfinge In 2017, Soberano Jr. won the La Copa Junior Nuevos Valores

=== Storylines ===
The tournament featured a number of professional wrestling matches with different wrestlers involved in pre-existing scripted feuds, plots and storylines. Wrestlers were portrayed as either heels (referred to as rudos in Mexico, those that portray the "bad guys") or faces (técnicos in Mexico, the "good guy" characters) as they followed a series of tension-building events, which culminated in a wrestling match or series of matches.

=== Family relationship ===
Wrestler	Family	Relationship	Ref(s).
Emilio Charles Jr.	Emilio Charles	Father	
Apolo Dantés	Alfonso Dantés	Father	
Dr. Wagner Jr.	Dr. Wagner	Father	
Espectro Jr.	Espectro I	Uncle	
El Hijo del Gladiador	El Gladiador	Storyline father	
El Hijo del Santo	El Santo	Father	
Héctor Garza	Humberto Garza	Father	
Humberto Garza Jr.	Humberto Garza	Father	
Karloff Lagarde Jr.	Karloff Lagarde	Uncle	
La Fiera	Hercules Poblano	Father	
Mano Negra	El Rebelde	Father	
Rambo	Pepe Mendieta	Father	
Rayo de Jalisco Jr.	Rayo de Jalisco Sr.	Father	
Scorpio Jr.	Scorpio	Father	
Silver King	Dr. Wagner	Father	
Shocker	Rubén Pato Soria	Father	

== Tournament ==
=== Brackets ===
First round
Dr. Wagner Jr.	W
Espectro Jr.
Héctor Garza	W
Rambo
Rayo de Jalisco Jr.	W
Karloff Lagarde Jr.
Apolo Dantés	W
El Hijo del Gladiador
Silver King	W
Humberto Garza
Mano Negra	W
El Hijo del Santo
La Fiera	W
Scorpio Jr.
Emilio Charles Jr.	W
Shocker

Quarter finals
Dr. Wagner Jr.
Héctor Garza	W
Rayo de Jalisco Jr.
Apolo Dantés	W
Silver King	W
Mano Negra
La Fiera	W
Emilio Charles Jr.

Semi finals
Héctor Garza	W
Apolo Dantés
Silver King
Emilio Charles Jr.	W

Final
Héctor Garza	W
Emilio Charles Jr.

=== Results ===
==== February 23 ====
No.	Results	Stipulations
1	Guerrero del Futuro and Guerrero Maya defeated Olímpico and Olimpus	Best two-out-of-three falls tag team match
2	Bronco, Máscara Mágica, and Pantera defeated Astro Rey Jr., Guerrero de la Muerte, and Mocho Cota	Best two-out-of-three falls six-man tag team match
3	Dr. Wagner Jr. defeated Espectro Jr.	1996 La Copa Junior first round match
4	Héctor Garza defeated Rambo	1996 La Copa Junior first round match
5	Rayo de Jalisco Jr. defeated Karloff Lagarde Jr.	1996 La Copa Junior first round match
6	Apolo Dantés defeated El Hijo del Gladiador	1996 La Copa Junior first round match
7	Silver King defeated Humberto Garza	1996 La Copa Junior first round match
8	Mano Negra defeated El Hijo del Santo	1996 La Copa Junior first round match
9	La Fiera defeated Scorpió Jr.	1996 La Copa Junior first round match

==== March 1 ====
No.	Results	Stipulations
1	Bronco, Máscara Mágica, and Pantera defeated Astro Rey Jr., Cadáver de Ultratumba, and Espectro Jr.	Best two-out-of-three falls six-man tag team match
2	Héctor Garza defeated Dr. Wagner Jr.	1996 La Copa Junior quarterfinal match
3	Apolo Dantés defeated Rayo de Jalisco Jr.	1996 La Copa Junior quarterfinal match
4	Silver King defeated Mano Negra	1996 La Copa Junior quarterfinal match
5	Emilio Charles Jr. defeated La Fiera	1996 La Copa Junior quarterfinal match
6	Héctor Garza defeated Apolo Dantés	1996 La Copa Junior semifinal match
7	Emilio Charles Jr. defeated Silver King	1996 La Copa Junior semifinal match
8	Héctor Garza defeated Emilio Charles Jr.	1996 La Copa Junior final match
