= La Copa Junior (2016) =

Mexican professional wrestling tournament

- Official poster for the January 19 show depicting finalists Puma and Esfinge
- Promotion: Consejo Mundial de Lucha Libre
- Date: January 5, 2016; January 12, 2016; January 19, 2016
- City: Mexico City, Mexico
- Venue: Arena México

Event chronology
| ← Previous; Sin Piedad | Next → Fantastica Mania |

La Copa Junior chronology
| ← Previous; 2014 VIP | Next → 2017 |

La Copa Junior (2016) (Spanish for "The Junior Cup") was a professional wrestling tournament produced and scripted by the Mexican wrestling promotion Consejo Mundial de Lucha Libre (CMLLl; Spanish "World Wrestling Council"). The tournament ran from January 5, 2016 to January 19, 2016 in Arena México in Mexico City, Mexico. CMLL's recurring La Copa Junior tournament featured second, third or fourth generation wrestlers completing against each other. The 2016 version of the La Copa Junior was the eight tournament held by CMLL.

The format of the 2016 tournament matched the 2012 version of the tournament and a number of CMLL's other annual tournaments. The 16 wrestlers were divided into two groups of eight that wrestle in a torneo cibernetico elimination match on January 5 and January 12, the survivor of each qualifying torneo cibernetico then faces off against each other in the finals on January 19, 2015. Puma won the first cibernetico and Esfinge won the second cibernetico to qualify for the finals. On January 19 Esfinge defeated Puma to win the 2016 La Copa Junior tournament

== Production ==
=== Background ===
Starting in 1996 the Mexican professional wrestling promotion Consejo Mundial de Lucha Libre ("World Wrestling Council"; CMLL) held their first ever La Copa Junior tournament. CMLL held the tournament to celebrate the fact that lucha libre in Mexico is often a family tradition, with a large number of second, third, or even fourth generation wrestlers following the footsteps of their relatives. The premise of the tournament is that all participants are second-generation or more, although at times the family relationship is a storylines family relationship and not an actual one. One example of this is Dragón Rojo Jr. being billed as the grandson of Dragón Rojo, when in reality that is simply a storyline created by CMLL. The original La Copa Junior was won by Héctor Garza.

CMLL would not hold another La Copa Junior until the 2005 tournament (won by Shocker), followed by a 2006 tournament won by Dos Caras Jr. The tournament did not return until 2010 where Dragón Rojo Jr. won the 2010 version. In 2012 third-generation luchador La Sombra won the Junior cup

In 2014, CMLL held two La Copa Junior tournaments, first a tournament on January 1, won by Super Halcón Jr., followed by a VIP tournament, featuring higher card wrestlers than the usual tournaments, which was won by Máximo The semi-regular tournament returned in 2016, won by Esfinge In 2017, Soberano Jr. won the La Copa Junior Nuevos Valores

=== Storylines ===
The tournament featured a number of professional wrestling matches with different wrestlers involved in pre-existing scripted feuds, plots and storylines. Wrestlers were portrayed as either heels (referred to as rudos in Mexico, those that portray the "bad guys") or faces (técnicos in Mexico, the "good guy" characters) as they followed a series of tension-building events, which culminated in a wrestling match or series of matches.

=== Family relationship ===
| Wrestler | Family | Relationship | Group | Ref(s). |
|---|---|---|---|---|
| Blue Panther Jr. | Blue Panther | Father | Block A | |
| Canelo Casas | Pepe Casas | Grandfather | Block B | |
| Cuatrero | Cien Caras | Father | Block A | |
| Esfinge | Magnum | Father | Block B | |
| Espanto Jr. | Espanto Jr. | Father | Block B | |
| Hijo del Signo | El Signo | Father | Block A | |
| Hombre Bala Jr. | Hombre Bala | Father | Block A | |
| Magnus | Tony Salazar | Father | Block A | |
| Oro Jr. | Plata | Father | Block A | |
| The Panther | Blue Panther | Father | Block B | |
| Puma | El Felino | Father | Block A | |
| Sansón | Cien Caras | Father | Block B | |
| Skándalo | Juan Manuel Mar | Father | Block A | |
| Soberano Jr. | Euforia | Father | Block B | |
| Super Halcón Jr. | Super Halcón | Father | Block B | |
| Tiger | El Felino | Father | Block B | |

== Tournament ==
=== Order of elimination ===
Block A January 5, 2016

| # | Eliminated | Eliminated by |
|---|---|---|
| 1 | El Hijo del Signo | Oro Jr. |
| 2 | Magnus | Skándalo |
| 3 | Cuatrero | Hombre Bala Jr. |
| 4 | Oro Jr. | Puma |
| 5 | Skándalo | Blue Panther Jr. |
| 6 | Hombre Bala Jr. | Puma |
| 7 | Blue Panther Jr. | Puma |
| 8 | Winner | Puma |

Block B January 12, 2016

| # | Eliminated | Eliminated by |
|---|---|---|
| 1 | Soberano Jr. | Sansón |
| 2 | Espanto Jr. | Super Halcón Jr. |
| 3 | Canelo Casas | The Panther |
| 4 | Super Halcón Jr. | Tiger |
| 5 | Sansón | Esfinge |
| 6 | The Panther | Tiger |
| 7 | Tiger | Esfinge |
| 8 | Winner | Esfinge |

=== Results ===
==== January 5 ====
| No. | Results | Stipulations |
|---|---|---|
| 1 | Angelito and Fantasy defeated Pequeño Nitro and Pequeño Universo 2000 | Best two-out-of-three falls tag team match |
| 2 | Flyer, Robin, and Star Jr. defeated Akuma, Artillero, and Espanto Jr. | Best two-out-of-three falls six-man tag team match |
| 3 | La Amapola, La Seductora, and Zeuxis defeated Estrellita, La Vaquerita, and Princesa Sugehit | Best two-out-of-three falls six-man tag team match |
| 4 | Guerrero Maya Jr. defeated El Sagrado | "Lighting match", 1 fall, 10 minute time limit 08:36 |
| 5 | Puma defeated Blue Panther Jr., Magnus, Skándalo, Hombre Bala Jr., El Cuatrero, Oro Jr., and El Hijo del Signo | 2016 La Copa Junior semifinal 10-man torneo cibernetico elimination match |
| 6 | Kráneo, Niebla Roja, and Ripper defeated Marco Corleone, Máximo Sexy, and Stuka Jr. | Best two-out-of-three falls six-man tag team match |

==== January 12 ====
| No. | Results | Stipulations |
|---|---|---|
| 1 | Robin and Sensei defeated Artillero and El Cholo | Best two-out-of-three falls tag team match |
| 2 | Disturbio, Nitro, and Okumura defeated Pegasso, Star Jr., and Starman | Best two-out-of-three falls six-man tag team match |
| 3 | Delta, Guerrero Maya Jr., and Titán defeated Boby Z, Hechicero, and Virus | Best two-out-of-three falls six-man tag team match |
| 4 | Esfinge defeated The Panther, Tiger, Sansón, Soberano Jr., Canelo Casas, Súper Halcón, Jr., and Espanto Jr. | 2016 La Copa Junior semifinal 10-man torneo cibernetico elimination match |
| 5 | Máximo Sexy defeated Ripper | Best two-out-of-three falls match |
| 6 | Atlantis, Dragon Lee, and Marco Corleone defeated Bárbaro Cavernario, Mephisto, and Último Guerrero | Best two-out-of-three falls six-man tag team match |

==== January 19 ====
| No. | Results | Stipulations | Times |
|---|---|---|---|
| 1 | Fantasy and Stukita defeated Mercurio and Pequeño Nitro | Best two-out-of-three falls tag team match | 13:30 |
| 2 | Los Cancerberos del Infierno (Cancerbero, Nitro, and Raziel) defeated Oro Jr. and Los Principes del Ring (Soberano Jr. and Star Jr.) | Best two-out-of-three falls six-man tag team match | 18:48 |
| 3 | La Amapola, La Comandante, and Reyna Isis defeated La Vaquerita, Marcela, and La Silueta | Best two-out-of-three falls six-man tag team match | 15:50 |
| 4 | Esfinge defeated Puma | 2016 La Copa Junior final match | 11:11 |
| 5 | Blue Panther, Pegasso, and Rey Cometa defeated Pierroth, Pólvora, and Vangellys | Best two-out-of-three falls six-man tag team match | 12:24 |
| 6 | La Peste Negra (El Felino, Negro Casas, and Rey Bucanero) defeated Máximo Sexy, Brazo de Plata, and Valiente | Best two-out-of-three falls six-man tag team match | 06:27 |
