= La Copa Junior =

Mexican professional wrestling tournament

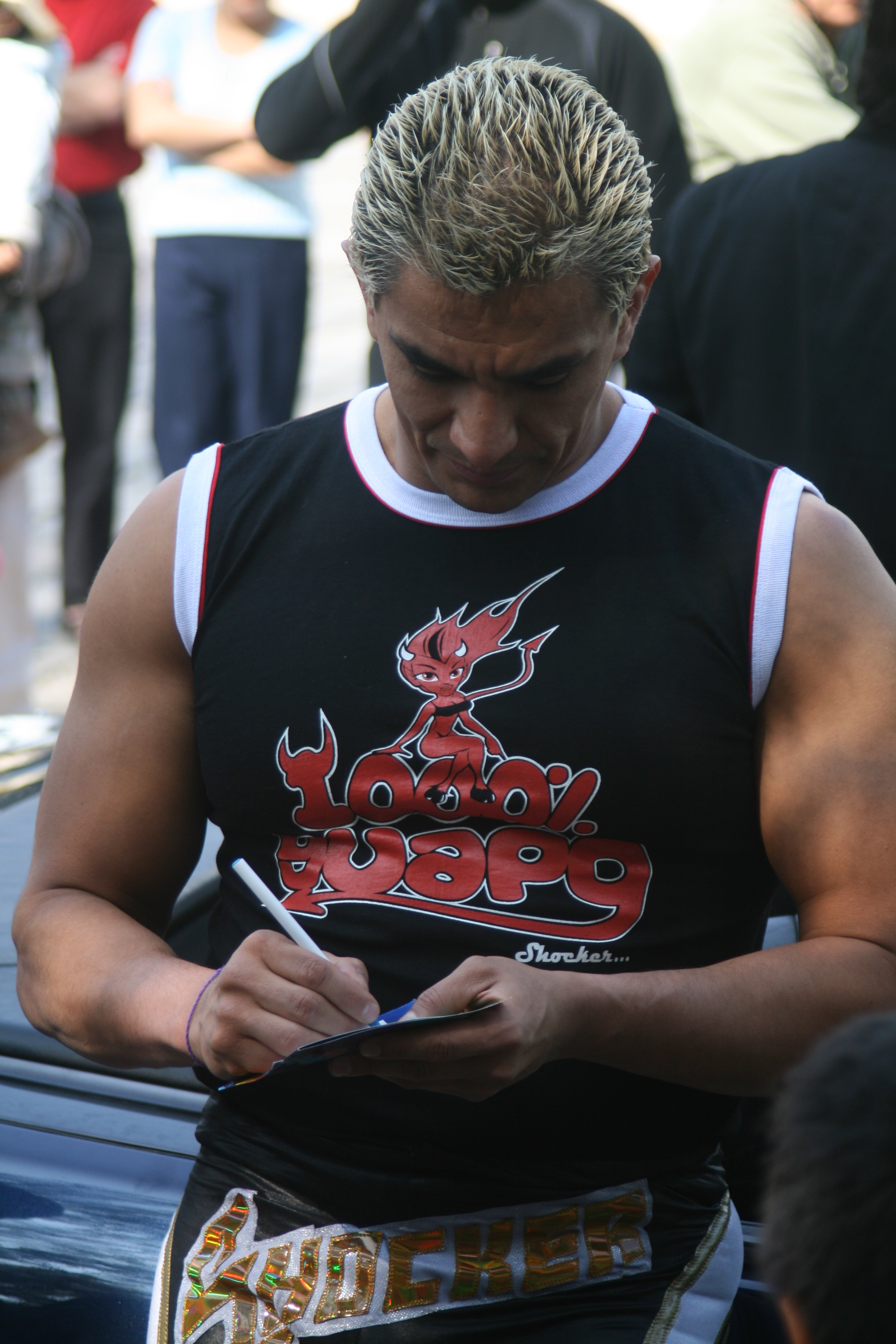
- Shocker, the winner of the 2005 La Copa Junior

Details
- Promotion: Consejo Mundial de Lucha Libre
- Date established: March 1, 1996
- Current champion: Angel de Oro
- Date won: March 26, 2021
Statistics
- First champion: Emilio Charles Jr.
- Most reigns: N/A
- Oldest champion: Emilio Charles Jr. (39 years, 140 days)
- Youngest champion: La Sombra (23 years, 41 days)
- Heaviest champion: Dos Caras Jr. (108 kg (238 lb))
- Lightest champion: Super Halcón Jr. (79 kg (174 lb))

The Mexican professional wrestling promotion Consejo Mundial de Lucha Libre (CMLL) has held the La Copa Junior ("The Junior Cup") tournament on an infrequent schedule since 1996. The tournament pays respect to the fact that wrestling is a family tradition in Lucha libre, with many second or even third-generation wrestlers following the footsteps of their relatives. So far CMLL has held ten tournaments starting in 1996 and then intermittently since 2005. While most of the family relationships are real there are a few instances of the family relationship being a storylines family relationship, such as Dragón Rojo Jr. being billed as the grandson of Dragón Rojo, when in reality that is simply a storyline created by CMLL.

The oldest tournament winner was Emilio Charles Jr., who was 39 years old when he won the 1996 tournament, while the oldest competitor ever was Brazo de Plata who was 51 years old when he wrestled in the 2014 VIP tournament. The youngest tournament winner was La Sombra, who won the 2012 tournament at 23 years of age. Cachorro or Mano Negra Jr. is the youngest wrestler to compete in the tournament, both were around 16 or 17 years old when they completed in the La Copa Junior tournament, but their actual birth date is not known, just birth year, making it impossible to determine who was the youngest entrant overall.

== La Copa Junior winners ==
Year	Winner	Date	Ref(s).
1996	Héctor Garza	March 1, 1996	
2005	Shocker	February 4, 2005	
2006	Dos Caras Jr.	March 31, 2006	
2010	Dragón Rojo Jr.	December 25, 2010	
2012	La Sombra	December 14, 2012	
2014	Super Halcón Jr.	January 1, 2014	
2014 VIP	Máximo	October 10, 2014	
2016	Esfinge	January 18, 2016	
Nuevos Valores	Soberano Jr.	April 28, 2017	
2017 VIP	Niebla Roja	December 1, 2017	
2019	Universo 2000 Jr.	December 17, 2019	
2021 VIP	Angel de Oro	March 26, 2021	
2022 VIP	Atlantis Jr.	May 27, 2022	
2023 VIP	Soberano Jr. (2)	May 26, 2023	
2024 VIP	Star Jr.	May 31, 2024	
2025 VIP	Zandokan Jr.	May 30, 2025	
2026	Villano III Jr.	May 29, 2026	

Note: "VIP" editions tend to focus on established higher-card luchadors, rather than rookies
