= Guerrero Negro Jr. =

Mexican professional wrestler

Personal information
- Born: Héctor Picasso Ríos; October 19, 1983 (age 42) Monclova, Coahuila, Mexico

Professional wrestling career
- Ring name: Guerrero Negro Jr.
- Debut: 2006

Héctor Picasso Ríos (born October 19, 1983 in Monclova, Coahuila, Mexico), better known under the ring name Guerrero Negro Jr., is a Mexican professional wrestler, best known for working for the promotion Consejo Mundial de Lucha Libre (CMLL) portraying a rudo ("bad guy") wrestling character. He is a second-generation wrestler, son of "Guerrero Negro II" and nephew of "Guerrero Negro III".

== Professional wrestling career ==
Héctor Picasso grew up watching his father and uncle compete under the ring names "Guerrero Negro II" and "Guerrero Negro III" (Spanish for "Black Warrior") and followed in their footsteps by turning professional around 2006. Another uncle of Piscasso wrestle as King Warrior and one of his cousins works as "Guerrera Negra". Picasso adopted the ring name "Guerrero Negro Jr." on his debut and worked on the Mexican independent circuit for several years. In 2007 he joined forced with Tigre Cota and Rey Infernal to form a trio known as "Los Cholos". In 2011 he began training at the Consejo Mundial de Lucha Libre (CMLL) wrestling school for an eventual CMLL debut.

=== Consejo Mundial de Lucha Libre (2012–) ===
Guerrero Negro Jr. was introduced as part of Generacion 2012 in the fall of 2012. Generacion 2012 included Herodes Jr., Taurus, Genesis, Oro Jr., Espanto Jr. and Akuma. Generacion 2012 was not a group, but more the "graduating class" from the CMLL wrestling school. Some, like Guerrero Negro Jr., were not actual rookies but they had never worked for CMLL before and only made their CMLL debut after extensive training in the CMLL wrestling school. Guerrero Negro Jr. teamed up with Herodes Jr. for his CMLL debut on August 18, 2013, losing to the team of Genesis and Höruz in the first match of the evening. On January 1, 2013 Guerrero Negro Jr. worked for the CMLL affiliated Toryumon Mexico, wrestling in the Young Dragon's Cup. For the tournament Guerrero Negro Jr. teamed up with fellow Generacion 2012 member Akuma, only to lose to Taurus and Zumba in the first round. On February 1, 2013 Guerrero Negro Jr. made his debut on CMLL's main show, Super Viernes in Arena Mexico, teaming with Camorra as they lost to Soberano Jr. and Sensei in the opening match of the show. In March 2013 Guerrero Negro Jr. was one of 18 wrestlers who competed in the second annual Torneo Sangre Nueva ("New Blood Tournament"), a tournament for young or low ranking wrestlers. He competed in qualifying block B on March 5, 2013 for a place in the finals, the other wrestlers in Block B included Genesis, Robin, Sensei, Super Halcón Jr., Disturbio, Guerrero Negro Jr., Inquisidor, Taurus and Zayco who competed in a torneo cibernetico, multi-man elimination match. Oro Jr. was the fifth man eliminated over all when he was pinned by Disturbio. In late March, 2013 Guerrero Negro Jr. was announced as one of the Novatos, or rookies, in the 2013 Torneo Gran Alternativa, or "Great Alternative tournament". The Gran Alternativa pairs a rookie with an experienced wrestler for a tag team tournament. Guerrero Negro Jr. was teamed up with the veteran Último Guerrero for the tournament. The team competed in "Block A" on April 12, 2013 where they defeated Oro Jr. and Máscara Dorada and the team of Disturbio and Volador Jr. in the second round. In the semi-final the duo lost to Hombre Bala Jr. and Último Guerrero's long time rival Atlantis Picasso left CMLL in April 2014. He got shot in an incident in October 2015. He is expected to return to CMLL early 2016.
