= Black Panther (wrestler) =

Mexican professional wrestler

- Black Panther in July 2020

Personal information
- Born: Unrevealed Torreón, Coahuila, Mexico
- Parent: Blue Panther (father)
- Relatives: Blue Panther Jr. (brother); Chachorro Lagunero (brother)

Professional wrestling career
- Ring names: Silver; Cachorro; The Panther; Black Panther; Dark Panther
- Billed height: 1.77 m (5 ft 9 1/2 in)
- Billed weight: 84 kg (185 lb)
- Trained by: Blue Panther; El Solar; Virus; Franco Columbo; Último Guerrero
- Debut: 2011

Dark Panther (born 1989) is the ring name of a Mexican professional wrestler, working for the Mexican promotion Consejo Mundial de Lucha Libre (CMLL). He portrays a tecnico ("Good guy") wrestling character. His real name is not a matter of public record, as is often the case with masked wrestlers in Mexico where their private lives are kept a secret from the wrestling fans. He is the son of Genaro Vazquez Nevarez, better known as Blue Panther, and is a brother of wrestler Blue Panther Jr. and Chachorro Lagunero. Initially wrestling in secret under the ring name Silver, he adopted his father's former ring name Cachorro (Spanish for "Cub") in 2014, which played off the Blue Panther name. He has since changed his ring name on three more occasions: firstly to The Panther (2014–2018), secondly to Black Panther (2018–2021), and then to his current ring name in 2021.

== Personal life ==
Black Panther is a son of professional wrestler, Genaro Vazquez Nevarez, better known under the ring name Blue Panther and a brother of Blue Panther Jr. and Chachorro Lagunero. His full given name is not a matter of public record in accordance with Lucha libre traditions where the true identity of masked wrestlers is kept private whenever possible. Both of Nevarez' oldest sons were featured in interviews around their father well before they became professional wrestlers, their names were never explicitly stated and they always wore the same Blue Panther mask that their father used to conceal their identifies and that of the then masked Nevarez. He is the cousin of Jesus Toral López, better known as Black Warrior, a long time wrestler. While he wanted to become a professional wrestler, his father disapproved of the idea, while his mother supported him from the beginning. In April 2020 a younger brother was introduced to the wrestling world, using the ring name Chachoro Lagunero ("The Lagunero Puppy"), wearing a version of his father's Blue Panther mask design.

== Professional wrestling career ==
=== Early career ===
CMLL originally stated that the wrestler known as Black Panther made his professional wrestling debut in early 2014 when he began working under the "Cachorro" ring name, but later on revealed his true debut year as 2011. In 2020, Black Panther revealed that he began training for a professional wrestling career without his father knowing about it. He made his debut, wrestling as the masked character "Silver" without the knowledge of anyone in his family. When his father later discovered that his son was already a wrestler, he relented but asked his son to change his ring name to "Chachorro", like he himself has been known as early in his career. He was first introduced as "Cachorro" and wearing a black and white version of his father's Panther themed mask during a show to honor his father's 35th anniversary as a wrestler in the fall of 2013. At the time his older brother was also introduced to the wrestling world as Black Panther with a similar mask, but no announcement of his official CMLL debut date was given at the time.

=== Consejo Mundial de Lucha Libre ===
==== Cachorro (2014) ====
Cachorro made his official in-ring debut under that name as one of 12 men to complete in Consejo Mundial de Lucha Libre's 2014 La Copa Junior on January 1, 2014. All competitors were second, or third-generation wrestlers competing in a torneo cibernetico elimination match. Both Chachorro and Black Panther were on the rudo ("Bad guy") team to even out the numbers between the two sides. The match also included Canelo Casas, Dragon Lee, Hijo del Signo, Guerrero Negro Jr., Herodes Jr., Hombre Bala Jr., Oro Jr., Robin, Stigma and eventual tournament winner Super Halcón Jr. During the match Cachorro eliminated Dragon Lee, but was himself eliminated eighth by Super Halcón Jr. Following La Copa Junior both Cachorro and Black Panther stated to team up with their father for six-man tag team matches, with the trio being billed as Los Divinos Laguneros ("The divine from the Lagoon"). They quickly began to face La Dinastia Casas ("The Casas Dynasty"; El Felino and his two sons Tiger and Puma), continuing a long running storyline between Blue Panther and the Casas family. Later that month Cachorro entered the 2014 Torneo Gran Alternativa ("Great Alternative") tournament, which is an annual tag team tournament that has a wrestling rookie team up with an experienced wrestler for the tournament. Cachorro was teamed up with his father for the tournament, defeating the team of El Rebelde (rookie) and Averno in the first round before losing to Oro Jr. (rookie) and La Sombra in the second round of the tournament.

On March 23, Cachorro competed in a 16-man tornero cibernetico match, competing for one of eight spots in CMLL's annual En Busca de un Ídolo ("In search of an idol") tournament. Cachorro, along with Cavernario, Dragon Lee, Guerrero Negro Jr. Hechicero, Star Jr., Soberano Jr. and Super Halcón Jr. qualified for the tournament while Black Panther, Canelo Casas, El Rebelde, Espiritu Negro, Flyer, Herodes Jr., Metálico and Oro Jr. were all eliminated. The first round of the tournament saw Cachorro face off against all 7 opponents in a round-robin tournament format. After the matches each wrestler was given points by a panel of judges as well as points off an online poll. After the first round Cachorro ended up ranked third, winning four of the matches, gaining 216 points from the judges and 137 points from the online poll. In the second round of the tournament Cachorro only defeated eventual tournament Cavernario and ended up in 4th place, 3 points behind 3rd place and 55 points behind the highest point scorer. On August 25, it was announced that Cachorro would team up with fellow rookie Dragon Lee for the CMLL 81st Anniversary Show, marking Cachorro (and Dragon Lee's) first appearance at CMLL's Anniversary Show, the promotion's most important show of the year. They were scheduled to compete in the first match against the brother-duo of Puma and Tiger.

==== The Panther (2014–2018) ====
"With his ability and being the son of Blue Panther, his future with his new name, The Panther, I see him as an almost sure-fire superstar for decades unless his ring style leads to early injuries that take him down."

— Dave Meltzer on Cachorro in January 2015.

During a press conference on November 19, Cachorro announced that he was changing his ring name to "The Panther" and adopting a new mask as well. At the same press conference, Black Panther announced he was taking the name "Blue Panther Jr." On December 19, 2015 The Panther and Guerrero Maya Jr. teamed up to defeat La Comando Caribeño ("The Caribbean Commando"; Misterioso Jr. and Sagrado) to win the CMLL Arena Coliseo Tag Team Championship, The Panther's first CMLL championship. In the fall of 2015 The Panther became involved in a storyline rivalry with Súper Comando, a low ranked masked rudo, part of a team known as Los Hombres del Camuflaje. Over the course of several months the two often faced off on opposite sides of tag team and six-man matches, often with Súper Comando targeting his younger opponent, tearing his mask to push the storyline that he wanted to teach the rookie a lesson. In early December CMLL announced that Súper Comando and The Panther would joint 10 other wrestlers; Blue Panther Jr., Puma and Tiger, Cancerbero, Esfinge, Fuego, Pegasso, Raziel, Sangre Azteca and Tritón in the main event of the 2015 Infierno en el Ring show. The Infierno en el Ring match came down to Súper Comando and The Panther being the last two wrestlers in the steel cage, with The Panther forcing Súper Comando to submit. Afterwards Súper Comando was forced to unmask and announce his real name. In 2018, during a match on Arena Mexico's Tuesday show, the announcer kept calling The Panther "Black Panther", the first ring name of his brother.

=== Japan and United States (2016–current) ===
In January 2016, The Panther made his Japanese debut by taking part in the CMLL and New Japan Pro-Wrestling (NJPW) co-produced Fantastica Mania 2016 tour. On the fifth show of the tour, he and The Panther successfully defended the Arena Coliseo Tag Team Championship against Bobby Z and Okumura. On November 3, 2016 The Panther made his debut for the US based Ring of Honor (ROH) promotion at their Survival of the Fittest double show in Texas. On night one The Panther defeated Will Ferrara, Silas Young and Yohey to advance in the "Survival of the Fittest" tournament. On the following night he lost a six-way match when he was eliminated by Dalton Castle in a match that was won by Bobby Fish.

== Championships and accomplishments ==
- Consejo Mundial de Lucha Libre
  - CMLL Arena Coliseo Tag Team Championship (1 time) – with Guerrero Maya Jr.

== Luchas de Apuestas record ==
Winner (wager)	Loser (wager)	Location	Event	Date	Notes
The Panther (mask)	Súper Comando (mask)	Mexico City, Mexico	Infierno en el Ring	December 25, 2015	(Note: Final two men in a 12-man steel cage match that also included Blue Panther Jr., Cancerbero, Esfinge, Fuego, Pegasso, Puma, Raziel, Sangre Azteca, Tiger and Tritón.)
