= Arkangel de la Muerte =

Mexican professional wrestler (1966–2018)

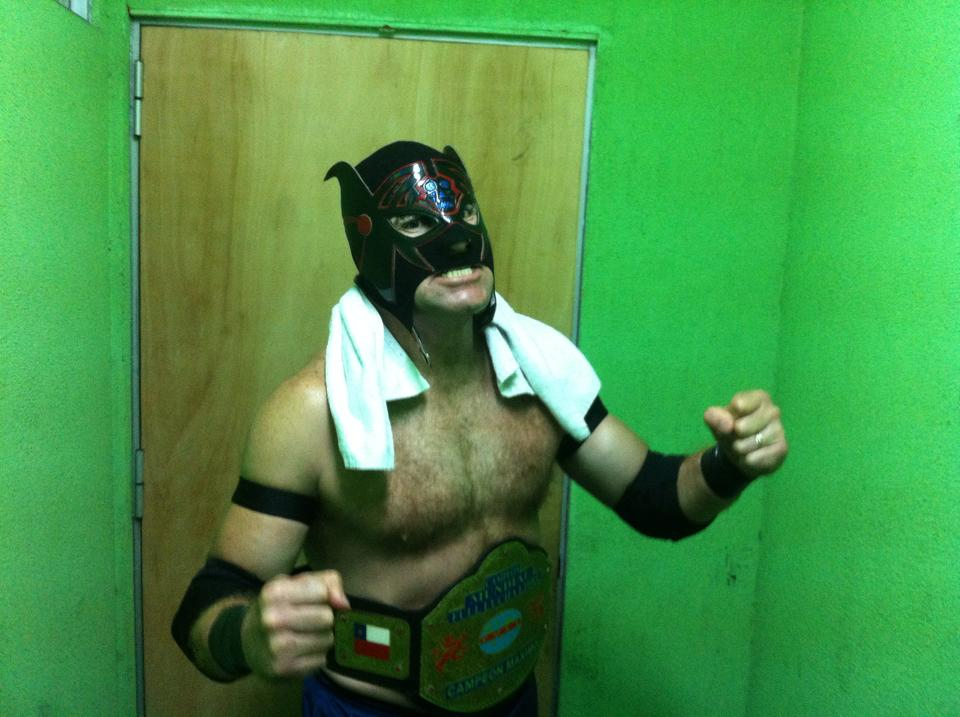

Personal information
- Born: Alfredo Pasillas; July 16, 1966 La Venta del Astillero, Jalisco, Mexico
- Died: June 13, 2018 (aged 51) Mexico City, Mexico
- Cause of death: Cardiac arrest

Professional wrestling career
- Ring names: Arkangel de la Muerte; Arkangel; Mister Cid
- Billed height: 1.75 m (5 ft 9 in)
- Billed weight: 86 kg (190 lb)
- Trained by: Diablo Velazco; Pepe Casas; El Satánico; El Mariscal; El Yaqui; El Carnicerito; Franco Colobo
- Debut: April 1985

Alfredo Pasillas (July 16, 1966 – June 13, 2018) was a Mexican professional wrestler, best known for his work in the promotion Consejo Mundial de Lucha Libre (CMLL) under the ring name Arkangel de la Muerte. He is often referred to as just Arkangel, and previously worked under the ring name Mister Cid until 1991. His name means "Archangel of Death" in Spanish.

In addition to his long in-ring career, Arkangel was most known for being a prolific professional wrestling trainer with CMLL's wrestling school and had a small or large part in training in all wrestlers who worked for CMLL between 2006 and his death in 2018. In the years leading up to his death, he served as the head trainer at the school. His in-ring career included reigns with the CMLL World Welterweight Championship and the Mexican National Welterweight Championship, as well as winning the mask of Ángel Azteca. He was a founding member of the groups Pandilla Guerrera and Los Guerreros Tuareg.

== Professional wrestling career ==
=== Early career ===
Alfredo Pasillas made his professional wrestling debut in 1985, using the ring name "Mr. Cid", an enmascarado (masked) character partially inspired by El Cid, an 11th-century Castilian nobleman. On June 8, 1988, Mr. Cid teamed with Pantera II to win the Naucalpan Tag Team Championship in a tournament final against Convoy and Perverso. The team did not last long, with a storyline break up that led to a feud between the two men. On September 4, 1988, Pantera II defeated Mr. Cid in a Luchas de Apuesta, mask vs. mask match, forcing Mr. Cid to unmask. A week later Pantera II and Carnelo Casas defeated Mr. Cid and Bestia Verde in another Luchas de Apuesta match, this time with Mr. Cid and Bestia Verde having their hair shaved off after the loss. In 1990 Mr. Cid teamed with Canelo Casas to win the Naucalpan Tag Team Championship once more, holding it until 1991.

=== Arkangel de la Muerte ===
In June 1991 Mr. Cid changed ring characters, becoming Arkangel de la Muerte, a rudo (heel or "bad guy") character with religious undertones. As Arkangel, he won the Naucalpan Tag Team Championship for a third time, this time while teaming with Guerrero de la Muerte, who became a regular partner for Arkangel in the following years. The team also held the Distrito Federal Tag Team Championship at some point in the first half of the 1990s. They would also team with El Felino to hold the Distrito Federal Trios Title in 1991, losing the title to Los Metalicos (Oro, Plata and Bronce). By the mind 1990s, the "de la Muerte" tag team had broken up, as Arkangel decided to focus on singles competition instead. On September 25, 1998, Arkangel defeated El Torero for the Mexican National Welterweight Championship, bringing the title back to Consejo Mundial de Lucha Libre (CMLL) for the first time in five years. Over the next 178 days, Arkangel successfully defended the title against Máscara Mágica, El Torero, Astro Rey Jr. and Pantera before losing the title to Astro Rey Jr. on March 22, 1999. Five months later, Arkangel won the CMLL World Welterweight Championship from Super Delfin on a show in Kawasaki, Japan. Arkangel defended the title several times, both in Mexico and Japan before losing the belt to Nosawa in January 2001, ending his title reign after at least 875 days.

When CMLL celebrated their 70th anniversary in 2003, Arkangel de la Muerte was booked in a Luchas de Apuestas match versus Ángel Azteca. Arkangel won and unmasked Azteca, in what was Ángel Azteca's last high publicity match.

In 2004, Arkangel held the Distrito Federal Welterweight Championship for a short period of time before losing the title to Ludwig Star.

In 2004, Arkangel de la Muerte became one of the founding members of a group called Pandilla Guerrera (Spanish for "Warring Gang"), a sub group of the top rudo group in CMLL, Los Guerreros del Infierno (Spanish for "the Warriors of Hell"). The Pandilla Guerrera group consisted of undercard wrestlers, teaming together in the hopes of improving their position on the card. When the group only saw limited success by the association with Los Guerreros del Infierno, they decided to break away from them in 2007. Arkangel, along with Nitro, Doctor X, Hooligan, Loco Max and Skándalo, formed a group called Rebeldes del Desierto (Rebels of the Desert), later renamed Los Guerreros Tuareg (Tuareg warriors). Arkangel was the co-leader of the group along with Nitro. On October 18, 2009, Arkangel was one of 12 wrestlers who put his mask on the line in a 12-man Luchas de Apuestas cage match. He was the ninth person to escape the cage and keep his mask safe.

In the mid-2000s Pasillas began working as a trainer for CMLL's lucha libre school, helping train young men and women for a wrestling career as well as providing additional training for lower ranked wrestlers. As part of his role Arkangel transitioned into working in the second or third match of the card against younger wrestlers to give them more experience and further their training. In the latter half of the 2010s Pasillas became the head coach of the CMLL lucha libre school, a position he was first introduced as when CMLL presented Generación 2011, a group of trainees under Arkangel's supervision that included Magnus, Dragon Lee (who later became known as "Místico"), Enrique Vera Jr., Hombre Bala Jr., Super Halcón Jr., El Hijo del Signo and Boby Zavala.

On January 1, 2011, Arkangel competed for the first and only time in CMLL's semi-regular Reyes del Aire ("Kings of the Air") tournament. The elimination match saw Arkangel and Ángel de Plata pin each other simultaneously thus eliminating both from the tournament. In early 2011 Arkangel teamed up with Black Warrior to compete in a tournament to determine the first ever Universal Wrestling Entertainment (UWE) Tag Team Championship. The team lost to La Máscara and Latino in the first round. Arkangel would hold the Chilean-based Federacion Universitaria de Lucha Libre (FULL) world championship on two occasions between 2013 and 2015. He first won the championship on a FULL show in Chile and then brought the championship with him to Mexico where he lost it to El Gallo on January 14, 2014. He would later regain the championship from El Gallo and later lose it to Boby Zavala at some point in 2015. In early 2016 Arkangel teamed up with his student El Hijo del Signo to compete in a tournament for the CMLL Arena Coliseo Tag Team Championship, the team ended up losing their first-round match to Disturbio and Virus. Pasillas' final wrestling match was on June 9, 2018, and saw the team of Arkangel, Kawato-San and Sangre Azteca defeat the trio of Bengala, Eléctrico and Oro Jr. at Arena Coliseo.

== Death ==
Pasillas was scheduled to wrestle on a CMLL show on June 12, 2018, but had informed the bookers that he was not feeling well and was replaced by El Hijo del Signo on the show. The following morning, June 13, his wife found him dead. It was reported that Pasillas died from cardiac arrest.

== Championships and accomplishments ==
- Consejo Mundial de Lucha Libre
  - CMLL World Welterweight Championship (1 time)
  - Mexican National Welterweight Championship (1 time)
- Comision de Box y Lucha Distrito Federal
  - Distrito Federal Welterweight Championship
  - Distrito Federal Tag Team Championship (1 time) – with Guerrero de la Muerte
  - Distrito Federal Trios Championship (1 time) – with Guerrero de la Muerte and El Felino
- Federación Universitaria de Lucha Libre
  - FULL World Championship (2 times)
- Regional Mexican Championships
  - Acapulco Welterweight Championship (1 time)
  - Guerrero Welterweight Championship (2 times)
  - Naucalpan Tag Team Championship (3 times) – with Pantera II (as Mr. Cid), with Canelo Casas (as Mr. Cid), with Guerrero de la Muerte (as Arkangel)
  - Naucalpan Welterweight Championship (1 time) – as Mr. Cid

== Luchas de Apuestas record ==
Winner (wager)	Loser (wager)	Location	Event	Date	Notes
El Pantera II (mask)	Mr. Cid (hair)	Naucalpan, State of Mexico	Live event	N/A	
El Pantera II (mask) and Canelo Casas (hair)	Mr. Cid (hair) and Bestia Verde (hair)	Naucalpan, State of Mexico	Live event	N/A	
Águila Negra (hair)	Mr. Cid (hair)	Naucalpan, State of Mexico	Live event	N/A	
Mr. Cid (hair)	Marte (hair)	Naucalpan, State of Mexico	Live event	N/A	
Arkangel de la Muerte (mask)	El Jabato (hair)	N/A	Live event	N/A	
Arkangel de la Muerte (mask)	Lover Boy (mask)	N/A	Live event	N/A	
Arkangel de la Muerte (mask)	El Verdugo (hair)	N/A	Live event	N/A	
Arkangel de la Muerte (mask)	Manny Hernández (hair)	N/A	Live event	N/A	
Arkangel de la Muerte (mask)	Nosawa (mask)	N/A	CMLL Live event	N/A	
Arkangel de la Muerte (mask)	La Sombra (Note: This was not the most recent La Sombra) (mask)	Mexico City	CMLL Live event	N/A	
Arkangel de la Muerte (mask)	Ultraman Jr. (mask)	Tokyo, Japan	Live event	January 1, 2001	(Note: Starman worked as Ultraman Jr. again for one night to lose his mask.)
Arkangel de la Muerte (mask)	Gallo Boy Z (mask)	Aguascalientes, Aguascalientes	Live event	July 4, 2001	(Note: This was the finals of a Ruleta de la Muerte tournament.)
Arkangel de la Muerte (mask)	Lyguila (mask)	Tulancingo, Hidalgo	CMLL Live event	June 29, 2003	
Arkangel de la Muerte (mask)	Ángel Azteca (mask)	Mexico City	Sin Piedad	December 14, 2003	
