= Rubén Pato Soria =

Mexican wrestler

Soria in the 2000s.

Rubén "Pato" Soria (February 2, 1942 - December 15, 2017) was a Mexican professional wrestler, in the 1960s who was very popular with the female fans. Retired in 1970 while on tour in the US. Probably more well known for being the father of current Consejo Mundial de Lucha Libre wrestler, Shocker. Rubén "Pato" Soria died of cancer on December 15, 2017 at the age of 75.
