= Hombre Bala Jr. =

Mexican professional wrestler

Personal information
- Born: August 8, 1991 (age 35) Ciudad Nezahualcóyotl, Mexico State, Mexico

Professional wrestling career
- Ring name(s): Hombre Bala Jr. Drone
- Billed height: 1.75 m (5 ft 9 in)
- Billed weight: 82 kg (181 lb)
- Trained by: Hombre Bala; Arturo Beristain; Arkangel de la Muerte; Shocker
- Debut: October 2, 2007; January 11, 2011 (In CMLL)

Drone (born August 8, 1991 in Ciudad Nezahualcóyotl, Mexico State, Mexico) is the ring name of a Mexican professional wrestler who works for the Mexican promotion Consejo Mundial de Lucha Libre (CMLL) portraying a tecnico ("Good guy") wrestling character. Until October 2016 he was known as Hombre Bala Jr. (Spanish for "Human Cannonball Junior" or literally "Bullet Man" Junior), reflecting the fact that one of his father's most known ring names was "Hombre Bala". Drone's real name is not a matter of public record, as is often the case with masked wrestlers in Mexico, where their private lives are kept a secret from the wrestling fans.

== Personal life ==
Hombre Bala Jr.'s full name is not publicly known, which is traditionally the case in Mexican professional wrestling when a wrestler has never been unmasked. It is known that his paternal last name is Ortiz, revealed when his father Aurelio Ortiz Villavicencio was unmasked. Ortiz is a part of the "Ortiz wrestling family", sometimes referred to as the "Pirata" family. As his ring name indicates, he is the son of Hombre Bala, Aurelio Ortiz Villavicencio, who also competed as Monsther and a number other enmascarado (masked) characters over the years, and India Sioux, a retired wrestler.

He has three siblings who are also active in professional wrestling; his sister works under the same ring name as their mother, India Sioux, and his two brothers work as Corsario and Monsther (a member of Los Invasores). Bala Jr. is the nephew of wrestlers Pirata Morgan and La Marquesa and the cousin of professional wrestlers Rey Bucanero, Hijo de Pirata Morgan, Pirata Morgan Jr. and Perla Negra.

== Professional wrestling career ==
Hombre Bala Jr. made his professional wrestling debut in late 2007, after being trained by his father, and initially worked for independent wrestling promotions around Mexico City. Soon after, he began training at the Consejo Mundial de Lucha Libre (CMLL) wrestling school under Talismán, Arkangel de la Muerte and Shocker in preparation for his CMLL debut. However, he broke his leg in a motorcycle accident and spent a month in the hospital to recover, delaying his planned debut.

=== Consejo Mundial de Lucha Libre (2011–present) ===
==== Hombre Bala Jr. (2011–2016) ====
In early 2011, CMLL introduced Generacion 2011, a group of young wrestlers who all made their debut around the same time, regarded as a graduating class from the CMLL wrestling schools rather than an official group; it included Hombre Bala Jr., Magnus, Dragon Lee, Enrique Vera Jr., Super Halcón Jr., Hijo del Signo and Bobby Zavala. He made his in-ring debut on January 11, teaming with Ángel Azteca Jr. and Metálico in a loss to Los Guerreros Tuareg (Doctor X and Hooligan) and Durango Kid. On April 1, he was paired with La Máscara for the Torneo Gran Alternativa ("Great Alternative Tournament"), where a rookie teams with an experienced wrestler, but lost to Lee and Volador Jr. in the first round. CMLL held a Forjando un Ídolo ("Forging an Idol") tournament in April and May to identify which of the 16 "rookies" would move up the ranks of the promotion. The tournament consisted of a round-robin group round, followed by an elimination round where the top two from each of the four groups competed. Hombre Bala Jr. defeated Puma King, but lost to both Diamante and Hijo del Signo, leaving him with only three points and failing to advance to the next round. On May 24, Hombre Bala Jr. was part of a first round torneo cibernetico in a tournament for the vacant CMLL World Super Lightweight Championship, which was won by Guerrero Maya Jr.

CMLL had been promoting a feud between the Generacion 2011 rookies and a number of veteran low to mid-card rudos ("bad guys") throughout most of 2011. By late 2011 that storyline began focusing more and more on the rivalry between the team of Hombre Bala Jr. and Super Halcón Jr. from Generacion 2011 and a brother team known as Los Rayos Tapatío ("The Lightning bolts from Guadalajara"; Rayo Tapatío I and Rayo Tapatío II). The two sides faced off several matches where the two teams would focus more on each other than the other men in the matches. As the storyline escalated the four wrestlers involved would tear at each other's masks, at times winning by pulling the mask off the other one to gain an unfair advantage, escalating the conflict. After months of escalating the storyline CMLL finally announced that the two teams would face off in a Lucha de Apuesta ("Bet Match") where both teams would put their masks on the line and would be forced to unmask if they lost the match. The Luchas de Apuestas match took place on CMLL's first show of 2012 in Arena Mexico. The young team defeated the veterans, earning them their first major victory in CMLL. Following the match Los Rayos discussed leaving CMLL, humiliated by the loss of their masks. CMLL held a 16-man tournament focusing primarily on rookies called Torneo Sangre Nueva ("The New Blood Tournament") in March, 2012 which saw Hombre Bala Jr. among the participants. He competed in the second block of the tournament, eliminated from the torneo cibernetico by fellow Generacion 2011 wrestler Hijo del Signo.

Just like in 2011 Hombre Bala Jr. also competed in the 2012 Torneo Gran Alternativa, this time teaming up with Marco Corleone, but once again he would be eliminated in the first round after losing to Atlantis and Tritón. Hombre Bala Jr. was one of 18 wrestlers who competed in the second annual Torneo Sangre Nueva tournament. He competed in qualifying Block A on February 26, 2012 for a place in the finals, the other wrestlers in Block A included Soberano Jr., Camaleón, Stigma, Höruz, Akuma, Espanto Jr., Herodes Jr., Cholo and Bobby Zavala who competed in a torneo cibernetico, multi-man elimination match. He eliminated both Espanto Jr. and Bobby Zavala and was the last man eliminated by eventual tournament winner Sorberano Jr. In late March, 2013 Hombre Bala Jr. was announced as one of the Novatos, or rookies, in the 2013 Torneo Gran Alternativa, or "Great Alternative tournament", being one of the few wrestlers to compete in both the 2012 and 2013 tournament as a rookie. Hombre Bala Jr. would team up with veteran Atlantis, the very man that unmasked his father years earlier, on April 12, 2013. The duo defeated Akuma and Mephisto in the first round, Taurus and Averno in the second round and Guerrero Negro Jr. and Atlantis long time rival Último Guerrero in the semi-finals to earn a spot in the finals. The finals took place on April 26, 2013 during the Arena Mexico 57th Anniversary Show and saw Boby Zavala and Rey Escorpión defeat Hombre Bala Jr. and Atlantis, two falls to one to win the 2013 Gran Alternativa tournament.

==== Drone (2016–2021) ====
On October 18, 2016 CMLL introduced the enmascarado character Drone, presented as a wrestler making his debut on the night. The following day on CMLL's informa show he revealed that he was formerly known as Hombre Bala Jr. but chose a new ring name to make a name for himself instead of using his father's name.

==== Return of Hombre Bala Jr. (2021–present) ====
In August 2021, he reverted back to the Hombre Bala Jr. character. In April 2022 he won the CMLL Arena Coliseo Tag Team Championship together with Robin.

=== New Japan Pro-Wrestling (2018) ===
On October 19, 2017, it was announced that Drone would debut for New Japan Pro-Wrestling (NJPW) in January 2018 as part of the Fantastica Mania 2018 tour, a series of shows co-promoted by CMLL and NJPW. He was a subject of controversy when he allegedly wrestled drunk at the January 21, 2018 show. Drone claimed he was not drunk, but had accidentally taken too much sleep medication.

== Championships and accomplishments ==
- Consejo Mundial de Lucha Libre
  - Mexican National Trios Championship - with Futuro & Max Star
  - CMLL Arena Coliseo Tag Team Championship - with Robin
  - Torneo La Gran Oportunidad (2021)
  - CMLL Bodybuilding Contest (2023 - Intermediate)

== Luchas de Apuestas record ==
Winner (wager)	Loser (wager)	Location	Event	Date	Notes
Hombre Bala Jr. and Super Halcón Jr. (masks)	Los Rayos Tapatío (masks) (Rayo Tapatío I and Rayo Tapatío II)	Mexico City	CMLL Live event	January 1, 2012	
