= Esfinge =

Mexican professional wrestler

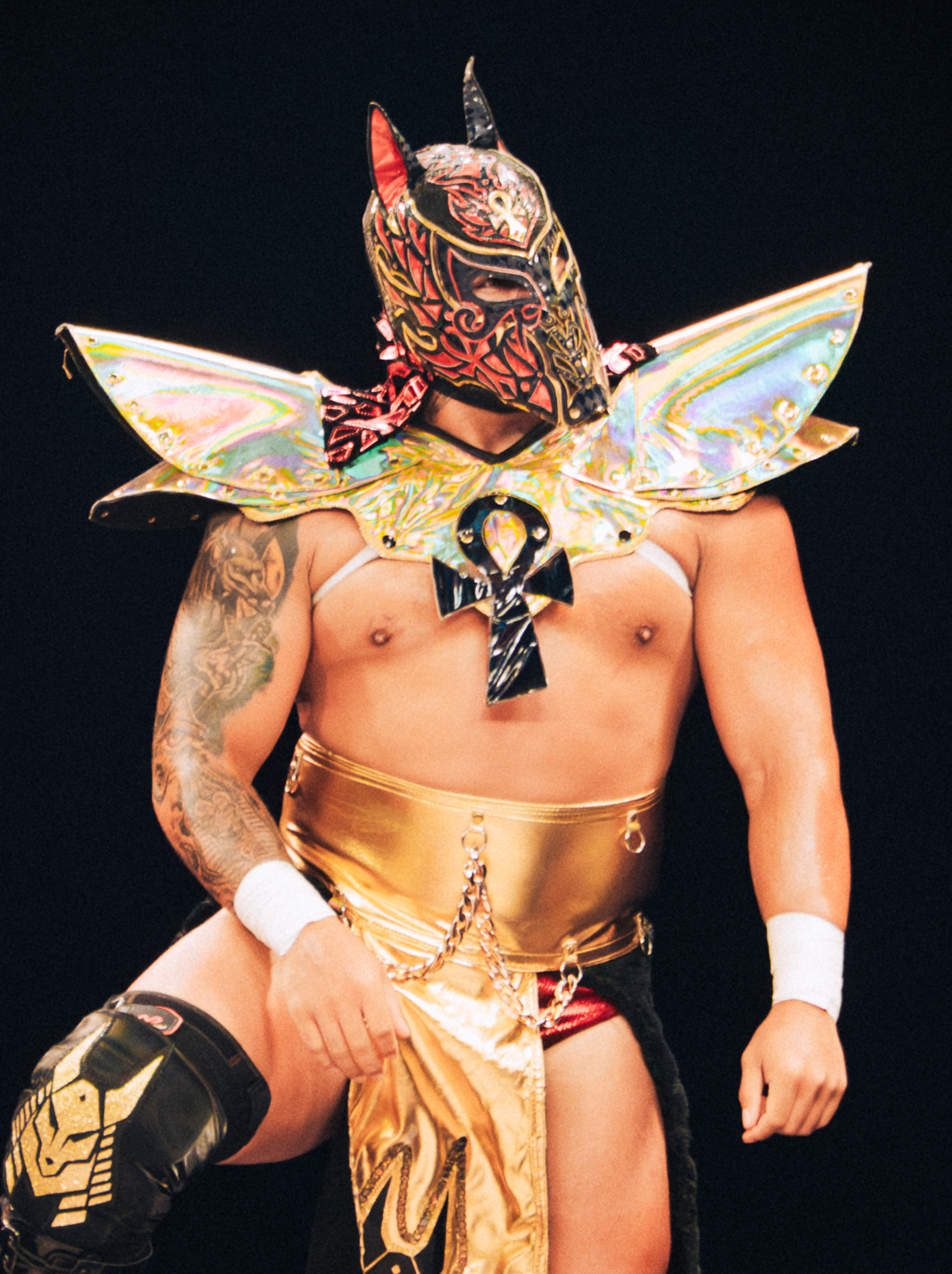
- Esfinge in April 2025

Personal information
- Born: June 14, 1993 (age 33) Guadalajara, Jalisco, Mexico
- Spouse: Tessa Blanchard (engaged)
- Family: Magnum (father); Halcón Furia (grandfather); Halcón Furia Jr. (uncle); Mr. Brisa (uncle)
- Website: Facebook; Twitter

Professional wrestling career
- Ring name(s): Esfinge; Halcón Furia Jr.
- Billed height: 177 cm (5 ft 10 in)
- Billed weight: 94 kg (207 lb)
- Trained by: Gran Cochisse; El Satánico; Máscara Mágica; Magnum
- Debut: 2009

Esfinge (Spanish for "Sphinx", born June 14, 1993) is a Mexican professional wrestler signed to Consejo Mundial de Lucha Libre (CMLL). His real name is not a matter of public record, as is often the case with masked wrestlers in Mexico, where their private lives are kept a secret from the wrestling fans.

The son of Magnum, the grandson of Halcón Furia and the nephew of Halcón Furia Jr. and Mr. Brisa, he began his career in 2009 under the ring name "Halcón Furia Jr." Two years later, he debuted in CMLL under the new ring name "Esfinge". He is the current Mexican National Heavyweight Champion, as well as a former Mexican National Light Heavyweight Champion (holding the longest reign in the title's history), CMLL Arena Coliseo Tag Team Champion, Mexican National Tag Team Champion, Occidente Tag Team Champion and Occidente Light Heavyweight Champion. He is also a former member of the stables La Excelencia Tapatia with Titán and Tritón, and a legacy member of La Fuerza Tapatia with Fugaz and Star Black. He has also wrestled in the United States for Ring of Honor (ROH), All Elite Wrestling (AEW) and Major League Wrestling (MLW).

== Professional wrestling career ==
=== Early career (2009–2011) ===
The wrestler later known as Esfinge made his in-ring debut in 2009, wrestling under the ring name "Halcón Furia Jr.", the same name his uncle used for years and was an homage to his grandfather, the original Halcón Furia.

=== Consejo Mundial de Lucha Libre (2011–present) ===
==== Early years (2011–2016) ====
In 2011, he was given a new ring identity, name and mask, becoming "Esfinge", a character with Egyptian inspiration. Due to the secretive nature of masked wrestlers in Mexico, Consejo Mundial de Lucha Libre (CMLL), the professional wrestling promotion that Esfinge works for, lists his debut as September 13, 2011, the debut of the Esfinge character. On September 9, 2012, Esfinge was one of eight Guadalajara wrestlers who competed in a steel cage match, in which the last wrestler in the cage would be forced to unmask under Lucha de Apuestas ("bet match") rules. Metatrón, Infierno, Acertijo, Black Metal, Halcon de Plata and Mr. Trueno all escaped the ring, leaving Esfinge to face In Memoriam, whom he defeated, forcing In Memoriam to unmask after the match and reveal his name, per lucha libre traditions. On March 5, 2013, Esfinge unsuccessfully challenged Bárbaro Cavernario for the Occidente Middleweight Championship. He was paired with Black Metal in a tournament for the vacant Occidente Tag Team Championship on September 15, but they were defeated in the semi-finals by Sky Kid and Smaker. In early 2015, Esfinge and semi-regular partner El Gallo won a tournament to determine the next challengers for the championship, defeating Exterminador and Malefico in the finals on February 13. On February 28, they defeated Boby Zavala and Olímpico to win the championship.

In May, Esfinge competed in a qualifying match for the En Busca de un Ídolo ("In Search of an Idol") tournament as one of sixteen wrestlers in the qualifying torneo cibernetico elimination match, where the last eight wrestlers would qualify for the tournament; he competed against Akuma, Blue Panther Jr., Cancerbero, Canelo Casas, Delta, Disturbio, Flyer, El Gallo, Guerrero Maya Jr., Jocker, Pegasso, Raziel, Sagrado, Stigma and Zavala. Esfinge eliminated Stigma during the match to become one of the eight survivors qualifying for the main portion of the tournament. Esfinge was one of twelve wrestlers risking their mask in a steel cage match on June 12, which came down to Esfinge and Espectrum as the last two wrestlers in the cage; Esfinge pinned Espectrum to win the match and the mask of his opponent. During the first round, Esfinge defeated Casas, Disturbio, Flyer and Guerrero Maya Jr., earning 80 points out of a possible 140. Esfinge was the first competitor to earn a "perfect 10" from a judge, as the very critical El Tirantes gave him a 10 on June 12 after his victory over Blue Panther Jr. He later received further perfect 10 scores from El Felino, Diamante Azul and Atlantis (twice), making him the only wrestler in the tournament to get five such scores; he got a total of 197 points from the judges. In the first week, Esfinge got the full 40 points from the fan polls, but in subsequent weeks of voting, had more mixed results ranging from 2 points to 18 points, receiving a total of 116 points from the polls. With a total of 393 points, Esfinge finished third in the first round, qualifying for the second round. He ultimately finished the tournament in fourth place. On September 18, Esfinge, Fuego and The Panther lost to Disturbio, Puma and Virus at the CMLL 82nd Anniversary Show. At Infierno en el Ring ("Inferno in the Ring") on December 25, Esfinge was one of twelve men risking their mask in the main event steel cage match, which he kept safe as the first man to leave the cage.

==== La Excelencia Tapatia (2016–2022) ====
At Sin Piedad ("No Mercy") on January 1, 2016, Esfinge, Blue Panther Jr. and The Panther lost to Los Cancerberos del Infierno (Cancerbero, Raziel and Virus). Eleven days later, Esfinge defeated Casas, Espanto Jr., Sansón, Soberano Jr., Super Halcón Jr., The Panther and Tiger to qualify for the finals of the La Copa Junior ("The Junior Cup") tournament, which he won by defeating Puma on January 19. During this time, Esfinge formed an alliance with Titán and Tritón, known collectively as La Excelencia Tapatia ("The Excellence of Guadalajara"). He teamed up with veteran Volador Jr. for the Torneo Gran Alternativa ("Great Alternative Tournament"), defeating La Máscara and Stigma in the first round, Golden Magic and Rush in the quarter-finals and Mephisto and Yago in the semi-finals, before defeating Fujin and Rey Escorpión in the finals on April 5. For the following year's Torneo Gran Alternativa, Esfinge was paired with Atlantis, defeating El Cuatrero and Máscara Año 2000 in the first round and Forastero and Shocker in the quarter-finals, before losing in the semi-finals to Sansón and Último Guerrero.

Esfinge won his first singles title on December 5, 2017, defeating Puma for the Occidente Light Heavyweight Championship; he is the last recognized champion. On March 10, 2018, Esfinge and Tritón defeated Disturbio and Virus in a tournament final to capture the CMLL Arena Coliseo Tag Team Championship. On October 26, he was the last wrestler eliminated by Templario in a torneo cibernetico to determine the next challenger for the Rey del Inframundo ("King of the Underworld") championship. He also participated in the Reyes del Aire ("Kings of the Air") tournament on January 6, 2019, but was eliminated by Pólvora. At Homenaje a Dos Leyendas ("Homage to Two Legends") on March 15, Esfinge, Audaz and Tritón lost to El Hijo del Villano III, Pólvora and Vangellys. On July 5, La Excelencia Tapatia unsuccessfully challenged Nueva Generación Dinamita (Elga Cuatrero, Forastero and Sansón) for the Mexican National Trios Championship. On March 6, 2020, he and Drone lost to Felino and Tiger in the first round of a tournament for the reintroduced Mexican National Tag Team Championship. The CMLL Arena Coliseo Tag Team Championship was subsequently vacated after Tritón left CMLL in September 2019. On April 17, 2021, in a tournament for the Mexican National Trios Championship, Esfinge, Flyer and Titán defeated Felino, Felino Jr. and Negro Casas in the quarter-finals, before losing to Cancerboro and Raziel in the semi-finals.

==== La Fuerza Tapatia (2022–present) ====
On March 20, 2022, Esfinge and Fugaz captured the Mexican National Tag Team Championship from Felino Jr. and Pólvora. This allowed Esfinge to compete in the Universal Championship tournament, losing to El Terrible in the first round on April 8. He, Fugaz and Star Black subsequently began teaming under the name OneAtos, later becoming known as La Fuerza Tapatia ("The Tapatia Force"). On May 23, 2023, Esfinge defeated Ángel de Oro to win the Mexican National Light Heavyweight Championship. He and Fugaz lost the Mexican National Tag Team Championship to Los Depredadores (Magnus and Rugido) on July 9. On September 1, Esfinge outlasted Audaz, Blue Panther Jr., Difunto, Espanto Jr., Fugaz, Furia Roja, Futuro, Magia Blanca, Magnus, Pólvora and Rey Cometa to qualify for the finals of the Copa Independencia ("Independence Cup") tournament at the CMLL 90th Anniversary Show on September 16, where he defeated Rugido. At Noche de Campeones ("Night of Champions") on September 29, he failed to win the CMLL World Light Heavyweight Championship from Bárbaro Cavernario. At Homenaje a Dos Leyendas on March 29, 2024, he defeated Zandokan Jr. to retain the Mexican National Light Heavyweight Championship.

In the main event of the CMLL 91st Anniversary Show on September 13, Esfinge risked his mask in a four-way elimination match also involving Euforia, Hechicero and Valiente. He kept his mask safe after being the first wrestler eliminated by Euforia, who in turn lost his own mask to Hechicero. On March 21, 2025, at Homenaje a Dos Leyendas, he and Valiente were defeated by Star Jr. and Zandokan Jr., who advanced to a Lucha de Apuestas in the main event. The following month, as part of the Universal Championship tournament, Esfinge defeated Atlantis Jr. and Averno in the three-way elimination first round. After defeating Akuma and Niebla Roja in the semi-finals, he lost to Titán in the finals, which also involved Ángel de Oro. At the CMLL 92nd Anniversary Show on September 19, Esfinge and Valiente were involved in a three-way elimination tag team match, where the winners advanced to a Lucha de Apuestas in the main event. In the end, after eliminating the teams of Cavernario and Dragón Rojo Jr. and Averno and Último Guerrero, Esfinge defeated Valiente, forcing him to unmask following the match. He was paired with Futuro for the Torneo Gran Alternativa on December 12, defeating Explosivo and Titán in the first round, but losing to Ángel de Oro and Yutani in the semi-finals.

On February 20, 2026, Esfinge unsuccessfully challenged Josh Alexander for the MLP Canadian Championship. On April 16, he participated in CMLL's first standalone event in the United States at Palms Slam Fest, teaming with Valiente Jr. and Xelhua in a loss to Barboza, Difunto and Soberano Jr. At Noche de Campeones on September 25, Esfinge lost the Mexican National Light Heavyweight Championship to Vegas Depredador, ending his record-breaking reign at 1,221 days, the longest in the title's history. However, he bounced right back a month later by winning the Mexican National Heavyweight Championship, having been intending to jump up in weight class regardless.

=== Ring of Honor (2017, 2025) ===
In October 2017, it was announced that Esfinge, along with fellow CMLL luchador Rey Cometa, would debut for the American promotion Ring of Honor (ROH), through their working relationship with CMLL, during the Survival of the Fittest three-night tour. On the first night in San Antonio on November 17, they defeated The Dawgs (Rhett Titus and Will Ferrara). The next night in Dallas, they unsuccessfully challenged Motor City Machine Guns (Alex Shelley and Chris Sabin) for the ROH World Tag Team Championship in a four-way match also involving The Dawgs and Silas Young and Beer City Bruiser.

Esfinge returned to ROH on the February 27, 2025 episode of ROH Wrestling, teaming with Atlantis and Fuego to defeat Euforia, Gran Guerrero and Rocky Romero.

=== All Elite Wrestling (2024) ===
Esfinge appeared for All Elite Wrestling (AEW) on the February 7, 2024 episode of Dynamite, sitting in the crowd during the six-man tag team match between Blackpool Combat Club (Bryan Danielson, Claudio Castagnoli and Jon Moxley) and Hechicero, Máscara Dorada and Volador Jr. He made his in-ring debut three nights later on Collision, where he and Star Jr. lost to Castagnoli and Moxley. He returned on the June 5 episode of Dynamite, teaming with Magnus, Rugido and Volador Jr. in a loss to Danielson, Castagnoli, Moxley and Wheeler Yuta.

=== Major League Wrestling (2024–2025) ===
On November 9, 2024, Esfinge made his debut for Major League Wrestling (MLW) at Lucha Apocalypto, teaming with Kevin Knight in a loss to Hechicero and Último Guerrero. At Kings of Colosseum on January 11, 2025, he lost to Averno in a three-way match also involving Máscara Dorada. At SuperFight 6 on February 8, 2025, he and Templario defeated Dorada and Místico. At Battle Riot VII on April 5, he competed in the 40-man Battle Riot for the MLW World Heavyweight Championship, but was eliminated by Alexander Hammerstone. Esfinge was then announced as a participant in the Opera Cup tournament, but lost to Guerrero in the first round at Fightland on September 13.

== Personal life ==
On January 1, 2026, Esfinge got engaged to fellow professional wrestler Tessa Blanchard.

== Championships and accomplishments ==
- Consejo Mundial de Lucha Libre

- Mexican National Heavyweight Championship (1 time)
- Mexican National Light Heavyweight Championship (1 time)
- CMLL Arena Coliseo Tag Team Championship (1 time) – with Tritón
- Mexican National Tag Team Championship (1 time) – with Fugaz
- Occidente Light Heavyweight Championship (1 time)
- Occidente Tag Team Championship (1 time) – with El Gallo
- La Copa Junior: 2016
- Torneo Gran Alternativa: 2016 – with Volador Jr.
- Copa Independencia (2023)
- Torneo Cinco de Mayo (2026)

- Pro Wrestling Illustrated
  - Ranked No. 252 of the top 500 singles wrestlers in the PWI 500 in 2026

== Luchas de Apuestas record ==
Winner (wager)	Loser (wager)	Location	Event	Date	Notes
Esfinge (mask)	In Memoriam (mask)	Guadalajara, Jalisco	Guadalajara Domingos	September 9, 2012	(Note: Steel cage match that also included Metatrón, Infierno, Acertijo, Black Metal, Halcon de Plata and Mr. Trueno.)
Esfinge (mask)	Espectrum (mask)	Guadalajara, Jalisco	Infierno En El Ring	June 14, 2015	(Note: Last two wrestlers in a 12-man steel cage match that also included Cuatrero, Flash II, Forastero. El Gallo, Infierno, Magnum, Ráfaga, Rey Trueno, Sansón and Virgo.)
Esfinge (mask)	Furia Roja (mask)	Guadalajara, Jalisco	Martes de Glamour	June 28, 2016	
Esfinge (mask)	Valiente (mask)	Mexico City, Mexico	CMLL 92nd Anniversary Show	September 19, 2025	(Note: Last two participants in a three-way Eliminatorio Parejas Increíbles involving Averno and Último Guerrero and Dragon Rojo Jr. and Bárbaro Cavernario.)
