= Super Halcón Jr. =

Mexican professional wrestler

Personal information
- Born: April 30, 1987 (age 39) Mexico City, Mexico

Professional wrestling career
- Ring name: Super Halcón Jr.
- Billed height: 1.78 m (5 ft 10 in)
- Billed weight: 79 kg (174 lb)
- Trained by: Mogur; Gran Apache; Halcón Ortiz; Dardo Aguilar; Impala; Arkangel de la Muerte
- Debut: May 2, 2004
- Retired: May 10, 2016

Super Halcón Jr. (born April 30, 1987) is a Mexican retired professional wrestler. He is best known for his time with the Mexican promotion Consejo Mundial de Lucha Libre (CMLL), portraying a tecnico ("good guy") wrestling character. Super Halcón Jr.'s real name is not a matter of public record, as is often the case with masked wrestlers in Mexico, where their private lives are kept a secret from the wrestling fans. His ring name is Spanish for "Super Falcon Junior", reflecting the fact that one of his father's ring name was "Super Halcón".

== Personal life ==
Super Halcón Jr.'s full name is not publicly known, which is traditionally the case in Mexican professional wrestling when a wrestler has never been unmasked. It is known that his paternal last name is Melchor, revealed when his father José Luis Melchor Ortiz was unmasked. Super Halcón Jr. took his name from one of his father's most famous ring names, Super Halcón.

== Professional wrestling career ==
Super Halcón Jr. began his wrestling career on the Mexican independent circuit around the end of 2008, including numerous matches for International Wrestling Revolution Group (IWRG) and Alianza Universal de Lucha Libre (AULL).

=== Consejo Mundial de Lucha Libre (2011–2016) ===
In early 2011, CMLL introduced Generacion 2011, a group of young wrestlers who all made their debut around the same time; it included Super Halcón Jr., Magnus, Dragon Lee, Enrique Vera Jr., Hombre Bala Jr., Hijo del Signo and Boby Zavala. He made his in-ring debut on March 21, teaming with Centella de Oro and Metatron to defeat Disturbio, Hijo del Signo and Siki Osama Jr. Two months later, Super Halcón Jr. participated in the opening round torneo cibernetico of a tournament to find a new CMLL World Super Lightweight Champion, which was won by Virus.

CMLL had been promoting a feud between the Generacion 2011 rookies and a number of veteran low to mid-card rudos ("bad guys") throughout most of 2011. Late in the year, Generacion 2011's Super Halcón Jr. and Hombre Bala Jr. feuded with the brother team Los Rayos Tapatío ("The Lightning Bolts from Guadalajara"; Rayo Tapatío I and Rayo Tapatío II), often focusing more on each other rather than their teammates during matches. As the storyline escalated, the four wrestlers involved would tear at each other's masks, at times winning by pulling the mask off the other one to gain an unfair advantage. In December, it was announced that the two teams would face off in a Lucha de Apuestas ("bet match"), where both teams would put their masks on the line and would be forced to unmask if they lost. It took place at Arena México on January 1, 2012, where Super Halcón Jr. and Hombre Bala Jr. defeated Los Rayos Tapatío for their first major victory in CMLL, in turn forcing the veterans to reveal their identities. Following the match, Los Rayos Tapatío discussed leaving CMLL, humiliated by the loss of their masks. In March 2012 and 2013, Super Halcón Jr. participated in the rookie-centered Torneo Sangre Nueva ("The New Blood Tournament"), but failed to win both editions.

On January 1, 2014, Super Halcón Jr. defeated eleven other wrestlers to win the La Copa Junior ("The Junior Cup") tournament. Super Halcón Jr. wrestled his final match on May 9, 2016, teaming one last time with Generacion 2011 compatriots Hombre Bala Jr. and Magnus to defeat Virus, Warrior Steel and Yago. The following day, he underwent eye surgery to address complications from a prior operation, and ultimately retired.

== Championships and accomplishments ==
- Comisión de Box y Lucha Libre Hidalgo

- Hidalgo State Welterweight Championship (1 time)

- Consejo Mundial de Lucha Libre

- La Copa Junior (2014)

== Luchas de Apuestas record ==
Winner (wager)	Loser (wager)	Location	Event	Date	Notes
Super Halcón Jr. (mask) and Hombre Bala Jr. (mask)	Los Rayos Tapatío (mask) (Rayo Tapatío I and Rayo Tapatío II)	CMLL show	January 1, 2012	Mexico City	
