= Torneo Gran Alternativa (2012) =

Mexican professional wrestling tournament

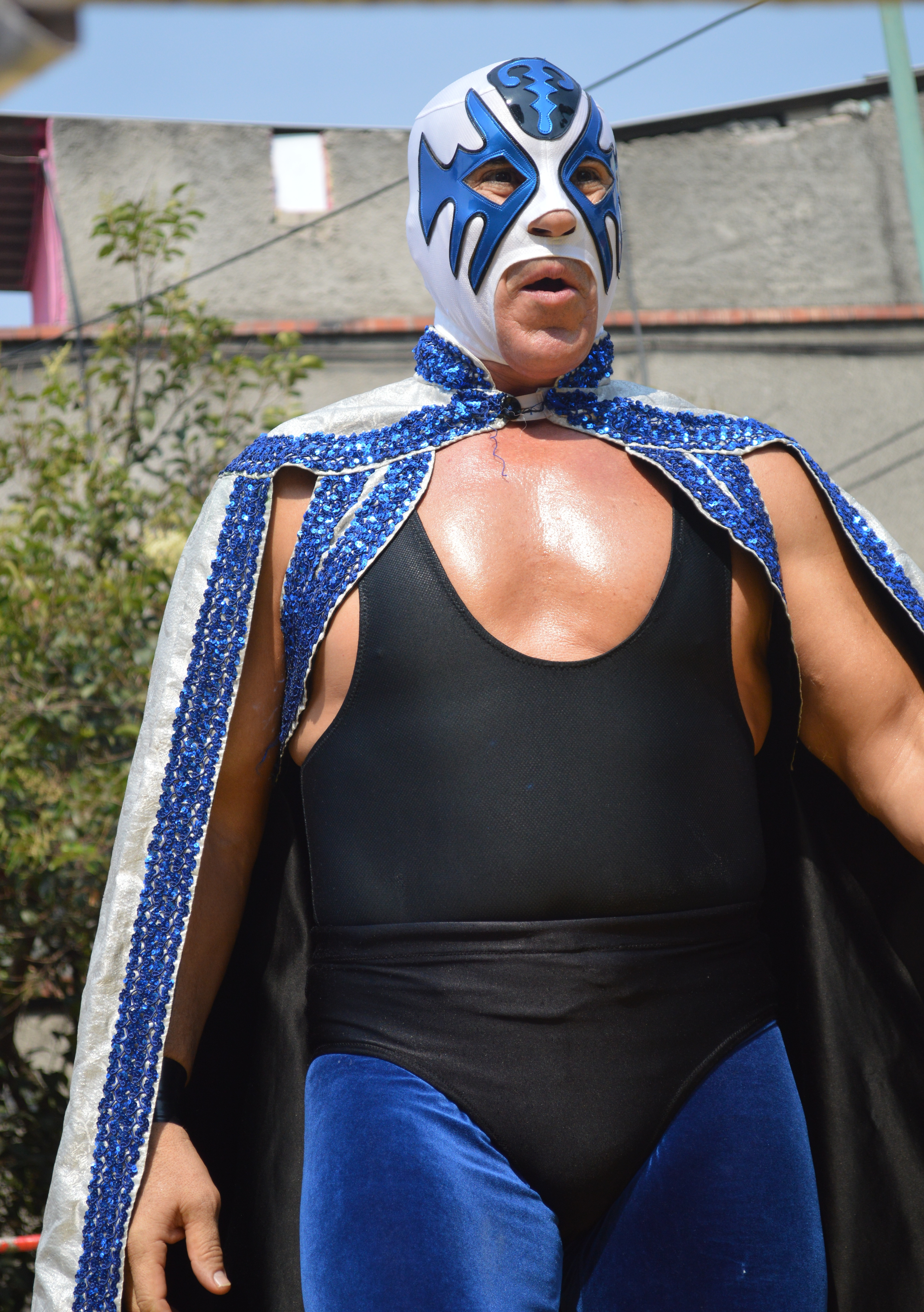
- Atlantis, who was a finalist in 2012 alongside Tritón
- Promotion: Consejo Mundial de Lucha Libre
- Date: March 30, 2012 to April 13, 2012
- City: Mexico City, Mexico
- Venue: Arena México

Event chronology
← Previous; Torneo Sangre Nueva	Next → En Busca de un Ídolo

Torneo Gran Alternativa chronology
← Previous; 2011	Next → 2013

The Torneo Gran Alternativa (2012) (Spanish for "Great Alternative Tournament") was the 2012 version of Consejo Mundial de Lucha Libre's (CMLL) Torneo Gran Alternativa, a tournament they had held almost every year since 1994. The 2012 version was the eighteenth Torneo Gran Alternativa and was held in March and April 2012. The tournament consisted of 16 tag teams, composed of a Novato (rookie) and a veteran wrestler, who may not normally team up.

Block A, which was won by the team of Euforia and El Terrible, took place on March 30, 2012, and Block B, which was won by Atlantis and Tritón, took place on April 6. The finals of the tournament were held on April 13 and were won by Euforia and El Terrible. the victory was the impetus for Euforia later joining Los Guerreros del Infierno ("The Warriors from the Inferno"). The Gan Alternativa also saw another chapter in a long-running feud between El Terrible and Rush as they met in one of the semi-final matches.

== History ==
Starting in 1994 the Mexican professional wrestling promotion Consejo Mundial de Lucha Libre (CMLL) created a special tournament concept where they would team up a novato, or rookie, with a veteran for a single-elimination tag team tournament. The tournament was called El Torneo Gran Alternativa, or "the Great Alternative Tournament" and became a recurring event on the CMLL calendar. CMLL did not hold a Gran Alternativa tournament in 1997 and 2000 held on each year from 2001 through 2012. The 2012 Gran Alternativa tournament was the 18th overall Gran Alternativa tournament. All tournaments have been held in Arena México, CMLL's main venue and as part of the CMLL Super Viernes show.

== Tournament background ==
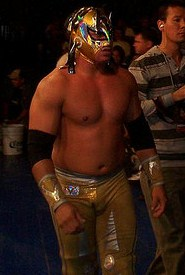
Volador Jr., who teamed up with Raziel for the tournament

The tournament featured 15 professional wrestling matches with different wrestlers teaming up, some of which were involved in pre-existing scripted feuds or storylines while others were simply paired up for the tournament. Wrestlers portrayed either villains (referred to as Rudos in Mexico) or fan favorites (Técnicos in Mexico) as they competed in wrestling matches with pre-determined outcomes. The tournament format followed CMLL's traditional tournament formats, with two qualifying blocks of eight teams that competed on the first and second week of the tournament and a final match between the two block winners. The qualifying blocks were one-fall matches while the tournament finals will be a best two-out-of-three falls tag team match. Each qualifying block started with all eight Novatos in the block competing in a "seeding" battle royal to determine the brackets for the block.

2012 Gran Alternativa participants

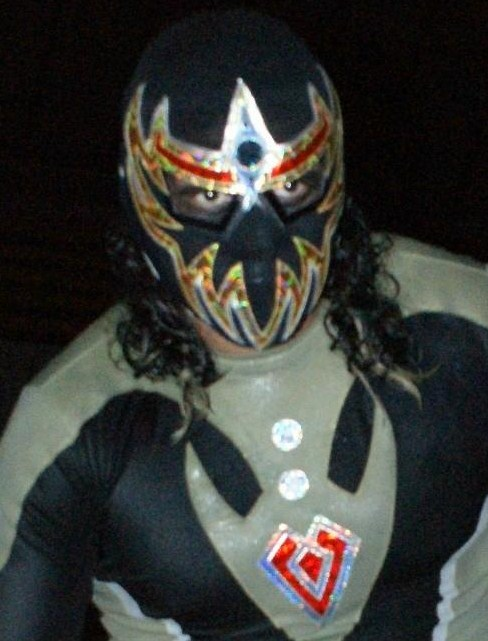
Máscara Dorada who teamed up with the rookie Titán

Block	Rookie	Veteran
Block A	Dragon Lee	Rush
Block A	Euforia	El Terrible
Block A	Niebla Roja	Último Guerrero
Block A	Pegasso	La Máscara
Block A	Puma King	Negro Casas
Block A	Rey Cometa	Blue Panther
Block A	Titán	Máscara Dorada
Block A	Boby Zavala	Rey Bucanero
Block B	Bronco	Mr. Niebla
Block B	Cancerbero	Mephisto
Block B	Diamante	Valiente
Block B	Fuego	Brazo de Plata
Block B	Hijo del Signo	El Felino
Block B	Raziel	Volador Jr.
Block B	Tritón	Atlantis

Raziel was billed as a rookie for the 2012 tournament, ignoring the fact that he had been a professional wrestler for 16 tears at the time of the tournament. He had previous worked as Caligula but in late 2009 was given a new name and mask, with no acknowledgement of his previous identity. At 39 years of age Raziel became the oldest "rookie" to compete in a Gran Alternativa tournament. Tritón had been part of the 2011 CMLL Torneo Gran Alternativa tournament, using the name "Metal Blanco", something CMLL did not refer to in 2012. Among the veterans the biggest ongoing storyline was the feud between Rush and El Terrible, who were both in Block A, expecting to clash at some point during the first night of the tournament.

The field featured several former tournament winners, including Rey Escorpión and Último Guerrero who had won the 2011 Gran Alternativa as a team, as well as Negro Casa, the first rookie winner in 1994. Previous winners Rey Bucanero, Blue Panther, El Felino, and La Máscara also competed.

== Tournament results ==
As predicted El Terrible and Rush, with their respective partners, faced off in the semi-finals after each team won their first two matches. In the end, Euforia and El Terrible defeated Rush and his brother Dragon Lee when Rush returned to the ring after being eliminated. Block B did not have a favorite going into the tournament, with no existing story lines driving the block. In the end Atlantis and Tritón defeated Raziel and Volador Jr. to qualify for the finale the following week. The finals of the tournament were held on April 13 and saw Euforia and El Terrible win the match and thus the tournament.

=== Tournament brackets ===
First round
Euforia and El Terrible	W
Máscara Dorada and Titán
Blue Panther and Rey Cometa	W
Negro Casas and Puma King
Niebla Roja and Último Guerrero	W
La Máscara and Pegasso
Dragon Lee and Rush	W
Boby Zavala and Rey Bucanero
Cancerbero and Mephisto	W
Diamante and Valiente
Raziel and Volador Jr.	W
El Felino and Hijo del Signo
Bronco and Mr. Niebla	W
Brazo de Plata and Fuego
Atlantis and Tritón	W
Hombre Bala Jr. and Marco Corleone

Quarter-finals
Euforia and El Terrible	W
Blue Panther and Rey Cometa
Niebla Roja and Último Guerrero	W
Dragon Lee and Rush
Cancerbero and Mephisto	W
Raziel and Volador Jr.
Bronco and Mr. Niebla	W
Atlantis and Tritón

Semifinals
Euforia and El Terrible	W
Dragon Lee and Rush
Raziel and Volador Jr.	W
Atlantis and Tritón

Finals
Euforia and El Terrible	W
Atlantis and Tritón

=== Tournament shows ===
March 30, 2012 Super Viernes

No.	Results	Stipulations	Times
1	Astral and Ultimo Dragoncito defeated Niño de Acero and Pequeño Violencia	Best two-out-of-three falls tag team match	—
2	Ángel de Oro, Black Warrior and El Hijo del Fantasma defeated Ephesto, Pólvora and Rey Escorpión	Six-man "Lucha Libre rules" tag team match	—
3	Bobby Zavala and Dragon Lee defeated Euforia, Niebla Roja, Pegasso, Puma King, Rey Cometa and Titan	Gran Alternativa 2012 seeding battle royal	—
4	Euforia and El Terrible defeated Titan and Mascara Dorada	Gran Alternativa 2012 First Round Match	—
5	Rey Cometa and Blue Panther defeated Puma King and Negro Casas by disqualification	Gran Alternativa 2012 First Round Match	—
6	Niebla Roja and Ultimo Guerrero defeated Pegasso and La Mascara	Gran Alternativa 2012 First Round Match	—
7	Dragon Lee and Rush defeated Bobby Zavala and Rey Bucanero	Gran Alternativa 2012 First Round Match	—
8	Euforia and El Terrible defeated Rey Cometa and Blue Panther	Gran Alternativa 2012 Quarter Final Match	—
9	Dragon Lee and Rush defeated Niebla Roja and Ultimo Guerrero	Gran Alternativa 2012 Quarter Final Match	—
10	Mephisto defeated Delta	Lightning match (One fall, 10 minute time-limit match)	08:20
11	Euforia and El Terrible defeated Dragon Lee & Rush by disqualification	Gran Alternativa 2012 Semi Final Match	—
12	Prince Devitt defeated Volador Jr. (c)	Best two-out-of-three falls match for the NWA World Historic Middleweight Championship	—
(c) / – the champion(s) heading into the match

April 6, 2012 Super Viernes

No.	Results	Stipulations	Times
1	Metálico and Super Halcón Jr. defeated Artillero and Cholo	Best two-out-of-three falls tag team match	—
2	Super Comando defeated Ángel Azteca Jr.	Lightning match (One fall, 10 minute time-limit match)	05:34
3	Hombre Bala Jr. and Tritón defeated Bronco, Cancerbero, Diamante, El Hijo del Signo, Fuego and Raziel	Gran Alternativa 2012 seeding battle royal	—
4	Cancerbero and Mephisto defeated Diamante and Valiente	Gran Alternativa 2012 First Round Match	—
5	Raziel and Volador Jr. defeated El Hijo del Signo and El Felino	Gran Alternativa 2012 First Round Match	—
6	Bronco and Mr. Niebla defeated Brazo de Plata and Fuego	Gran Alternativa 2012 First Round Match	—
7	Atlantis and Tritón defeated Hombre Bala Jr. and Marco Corleone	Gran Alternativa 2012 First Round Match	—
8	Raziel and Volador Jr. defeated Cancerbero and Mephisto	Gran Alternativa 2012 Quarter Final Match	—
9	Atlantis and Tritón defeated Bronco and Mr. Niebla	Gran Alternativa 2012 Quarter Final Match	—
10	Los Invasores (Mr. Águila, Olímpico and Psicosis) defeated Black Warrior, Blue Panther and El Hijo del Fantasma	Six-man "Lucha Libre rules" tag team match	—
11	Atlantis and Tritón defeated Raziel and Volador Jr. by disqualification	Gran Alternativa 2012 Semi Final Match	—
12	El Terrible, Negro Casas and Último Guerrero defeated Diamante Azul, La Máscara and Máscara Dorada	Six-man "Lucha Libre rules" tag team match	—

April 13, 2012 Super Viernes

No.	Results	Stipulations	Times
1	Apocalipsis and Bronco defeated Horus and Leono	Best two-out-of-three falls tag team match	—
2	Bam Bam, Electrico and Fantasy defeated Pequeño Nitro, Pequeño Olímpico and Pequeño Black Warrior	Six-man "Lucha Libre rules" tag team match	—
3	Pólvora defeated Diamante	Lightning match (One fall, 10 minute time-limit match)	06:29
4	El Hijo del Fantasma, Stuka Jr. and Valiente defeated La Fiebre Amarilla (Namajague and Okumura) and Misterioso Jr.	Six-man "Lucha Libre rules" tag team match	—
5	Diamante Azul, La Sombra and Rush defeated Los Hijos del Averno (Averno, Ephesto and Mephisto)	Six-man "Lucha Libre rules" tag team match	—
6	Euforia and El Terrible defeated Tritón and Atlantis	2012 Gran Alternativa tournament final match	—

== Aftermath ==
A few months after his Gran Alternativa win Euforia was made a member of Los Guerreros del Infierno CMLL's top rudo faction. In 2014 Euforia teamed up with Atlantis to win that year's Torneo Nacional de Parejas Increibles ("National Incredible pairs tournament"). Euforia, Niebla Roja and Último Guerrero defeated Los Estetas del Aire (Máscara Dorada, Místico and Valiente) to win the CMLL World Trios Championship.

El Terrible's long-running feud with Rush continued throughout most of 2012, including Rush, Marco Corleone and Maximo (collectively known as El Bufete del Amor; "The Law of Love") successfully defending the CMLL World Trios Championship against La Fuerza TRT, El Terrible, Rey Bucanero and Tiger in the main event of the 56. Aniversario de Arena México show. Later on El Terrible would defeat Rush in the finals of the 2012 Universarl Championship tournament. The feud culminated in the main event of the CMLL 79th Anniversary Show where Rush defeated El Terrible in a Lucha de Apuestas, or "bet match", after which El Terrible was shaved bald as a result.

The Dragon Lee that participated in the 2014 Gran Alternativa tournament was not the same as the 2012 Dragon Lee, but his younger brother who had taken over the character after the original Dragon Lee became the new Mistico.
