= CMLL Super Viernes (October 2012) =

In October 2012 the Mexican professional wrestling promotion Consejo Mundial de Lucha Libre (CMLL) held four CMLL Super Viernes shows, all of which took take place in Arena México on Friday nights. Some of the matches from Super Viernes were taped for CMLL's weekly shows that air in Mexico the week following the Super Viernes show. The shows featured various professional wrestling matches with different wrestlers involved in pre-existing scripted feuds or storylines. Wrestlers portray either villains (referred to as "rudos" in Mexico) or fan favorites ("technicos" in Mexico) as they follow a series of tension-building events, which culminate in a wrestling match or series of matches.

== October 5, 2012 ==
CMLL Super Viernes
- Poster for the October 5th event
- Promotion: Consejo Mundial de Lucha Libre (CMLL)
- Date: October 5, 2012
- City: Mexico City, Mexico
- Venue: Arena México

CMLL Super Viernes chronology
← Previous; Super Viernes September 28, 2012	Next → Super Viernes October 12, 2012

Consejo Mundial de Lucha Libre's (CMLL) October 5, 2012 Super Viernes show featured six matches wrestling matches in total. The main event saw the then CMLL World Trios Champions El Bufete del Amor (Marco Corleone, Máximo and Rush) face off against La Peste Negra (El Felino, Mr. Niebla and Negro Casas) in a non-title match. The semi-main event focused on the ongoing storyline tension between Rey Escorpión and the group Los Guerreros del Infierno as Escorpión teams up with two Los Guerreros members in Dragón Rojo, Jr. and (Euforia. Throughout the storyline Dragón Rojo, Jr. has been trying to play peace-keeper between Escorpión and the group, while Euforia (along with Los Guerreros leader Último Guerrero attacked Rey Escorpión following a loss during the previous week's Super Viernes show. The show was rounded out by two additional Best two out of three falls Six-man tag team match, a Lightning Match (One fall, 10-minute time-limit match) and a Tag Team match.

== Event ==
The opening match of the evening was the Super Viernes debut of tecnico wrestler Stigma, who had primarily worked in the Puebla, Puebla area, primarily at CMLL's Arena Puebla since his debut in 2010. For this match he teamed up with Camaleón to face two wrestlers he had a long running rivalry with in Arena Puebla, the brothers known as Los Hombres del Camoflaje (Spanish for "Men in Camouflage") Artillero and Super Comando. The tecnico team won the first fall in short order only for los Hombres del Camoflaje to even the falls between them, forcing the match to go to three falls in total. In the end Stigma had a successful debut as his team won two falls to one.

The second match of the evening saw the tecnico team of the experienced Sensei team up with Hombre Bala Jr. and Super Halcón Jr. who had only been wrestling for a couple of years. On the rudo side Disturbio teamed up with Hijo del Signo, and Bobby Zavala who like Bala, Jr. and Halcon, Jr. were promoted as part of Generación 2011, CMLL's "Class of 2011" wrestling school graduates. The match focused on the developing rivalry between Sensei and el Hijo del Signo, who worked a rougher match against each other, including ripping the opponents masks open. Hijo del Signo's team took the first fall with Sensei's team picking up the second fall. The third fall, the longest of the match Hijo del Signo was able to pin Sensei to take the victory for his team.

The night's third match was the Lighting match, a one fall, 10-minute time limit singles match which is traditionally booked for the second or third fall. On October 5 La Fuerza TRT team member Tiger faced off against former two time Mexican National Trios Champion Delta. Tiger, nicknamed el Rebelde Rufián ("The Ruffian Rebel") lived up to his nickname and his rudo status as he took advantage of the referee's attention being diverted and landed a low, and illegal blow on Delta, allowing him to pin his opponent for the victory.

In the break between the third and fourth match CMLL presented the 2012 Leyenda de Azul ("Legend of the Blue") trophy that would be awarded to the winner of the Leyenda de Azul tournament on the follow week's Super Viernes show.

The theme of the fourth match was "Mexico vs. Japan", featuring CMLL's team of Rudo Japanese wrestlers La Ola Amarillo ("The Yellow Wave") captained by CMLL Mainstay Okumura, teaming up with Taichi, a regular visitor from the Japanese wrestling promotion New Japan Pro-Wrestling (NJPW) and Namajague, a NJPW rookie sent to Mexico for an extended period of time to gain international experience. La Ola Amarilla faced the team of Guerrero Maya, Jr., Valiente and Sagrado who, while not a regular team, worked well together as a team and took the victory for Mexico, two falls to one.

While the first four matches of the night did not have a storyline leading up to the match, the fifth match was part of a long running storyline of internal tension in the Los Guerreros del Infierno group, with Rey Escorpión having been kicked out of the group earlier in the year. While Escorpión has had problems with his partner for the night Euforia he had no problems with Dragón Rojo, Jr. leading up to the match. The dysfunctional team faced the tecnico team of Místico La Nueva Era, La Sombra and La Mascara, which proved to be united in their two falls to one victory over Los Guerreros. After the match and after their opponents had left the team Rey Escorpión and Dragón Rojo, Jr. attacked Euforia, beating him up before tearing Euforia's Los Guerreros del Infierno tights to pieces. As a result, Los Guerreros have split down the middle with Dragón Rojo, Jr. and Rey Escorpión on one side and Euforia and Los Guerreros leader Último Guerrero on the other side.

The main event of the evening featured the reigning CMLL World Trios Champions Marco Corleone, Máximo and Rush, collectively known as El Bufete del Amor ("The Law of Love") facing off against La Peste Negra ("The Black Plague") team of El Felino, Mr. Niebla and Negro Casas. While the Trios championship was not on the line, a Peste Negra victory would make them the logical contenders for the championship. The champions lost the first fall and had to fight had to just even the score between the two teams. The third and final fall of the evening was the longest of the match and did not end until Marco Corleone scored the final pinfall, turning back the challenge of La Peste Negra.

=== Results ===
No.	Results	Stipulations
1	Camaleón and Stigma defeated Los Hombres del Camoflaje (Artillero and Super Comando)	Best two out of three falls Tag team match
2	Hijo del Signo, Disturbio and Bobby Zavala defeated Sensei, Hombre Bala Jr. and Super Halcón Jr.	Six-man tag team match
3	Tiger defeated Delta	Lightning match (One fall, 10 minute time-limit match)
4	Guerrero Maya Jr., Valiente and Sagrado defeated La Ola Amarilla (Taichi, Okumura and Namajague)	Six-man tag team match
5	Místico, La Sombra and La Mascara defeated Los Guerreros del Infierno (Dragón Rojo, Jr. and Euforia) and Rey Escorpión	Six-man tag team match
6	El Bufete del Amor (Marco Corleone, Máximo and Rush) defeated La Peste Negra (El Felino, Mr. Niebla and Negro Casas)	Six-man tag team match

== October 12, 2012 ==
CMLL Super Viernes
- Poster for the Leyenda de Azul Tournament
- Promotion: Consejo Mundial de Lucha Libre (CMLL)
- Date: October 12, 2012
- City: Mexico City, Mexico
- Venue: Arena México

CMLL Super Viernes chronology
← Previous; Super Viernes October 5, 2012	Next → Super Viernes October 19, 2012

Consejo Mundial de Lucha Libre's (CMLL) held their annual Leyenda de Azul ("Blue Legend") during the October 12, 2012 Super Viernes show. The tournament honored Blue Demon, or Demonio Azul as he's sometimes referred to. Up until 2008 the tournament was endorsed by Blue Demon's adopted son Blue Demon, Jr. but from 2011 forward it was endorsed by Blue Demon's biological son, referred to as "El Hijo de Blue Demon" ("the Son of Blue Demon"). The 2012 Leyenda de Azul saw 16 wrestlers compete for the title, including the 2008 Winner El Terrible. The event was also the first CMLL match for Tama Tonga, who regularly works for New Japan Pro-Wrestling (NJPW). The show featured four additional matches including the main event where Máscara Dorada, Místico II, Titán face off against Los Hijos del Averno ("The Sons of Hell") Averno, Ephesto, Mephisto.

=== Event ===
The opening match, a Tag Team, was originally announced as the team of Hombre Bala Jr. and SSuper Halcón Jr. vs. Bobby Zavala and Disturbio, but on October 9 it was announced that Hombre Bala Jr. and Super Halcón Jr. had been replaced by Leono and Sensei, with no explanation for the change given. During the third fall Distubio was pinned and eliminated from the match, only for him to remove his boot and use it against Sensei and Leono to allow Bobby Zavala to gain the third and deciding fall for his team. In the second match tecnico Tritón unveiled a new mask design, including a stylized fish fin running down the back of his mask and a fishmouth pattern around the mouth opening of his mask, Tritón teamed up with Fuego and Starman, facing off against Los Guerreros Tuareg (Arkangel de la Muerte and Skándalo) and Okumura. Tritón's team won both the second and the third fall to win the match.

The third match of the night was originally announced as León making her CMLL debut against La Amapola in a Lightning match (One fall, 10-minute time-limit match) A couple of days later it was announced that the match would now be for León's Reina-CMLL International Championship instead of the standard Lightning match. La Amapola was accompanied by Skándalo, who often accompanied her to the ring for important matches, while Leon was accompanied by Starman to keep Skándalo in check. Leon started out by outwrestling her opponent, pinning her to take the first fall after a high flying move. La Amapola took the second fall in quick succession, forcing the match to go to three falls in total. Leon used several high flying moves in an attempt to retain her title and the match saw both wrestlers gain several two counts, but it was not until La Amapola was able to apply a Backcracker (Double knee backbreaker) to win the third fall and the championship. The victory made Amapola the second ever Reina-CMLL International Champion and the first Mexican to hold the title.

=== La Leyenda de Plata 2012 ===
The fourth match of the evening was a special attraction match, CMLL's annual Leyenda de Azul ("Legend of the Blue") tournament, in honor of the Lucha Libre Legend Blue Demon. The tournament was a 16-man torneo cibernetico elimination match that included Atlantis, Brazo de Plata, Marco Corleone, Diamante, Diamante Azul, Euforia, Kráneo, Misterioso, Jr., Mr. Águila, Rush, Shocker, La Sombra, El Terrible, Tama Tonga, Último Guerrero and Volador Jr. The match was the first CMLL match for Tama Tonga, who had arrived in Mexico only a few days earlier, representing New Japan Pro-Wrestling (NJPW). During the match some rivalries were reignited, such as Rush and El Terrible rekindling the feud that had culminated in the main event of the CMLL 79th Anniversary Show, causing the two to eliminate each other. Former CMLL World Tag Team Champions La Sombra and Volador Jr. continued their long running storyline as Volador Jr. pulled La Sombra's mask off during the match and then pinned his distracted opponent. Volador Jr. tried the same tactic against Diamante Azul, but was caught by the referee and disqualified. This left veteran Último Guerrero and Diamante Azul as the last two in the ring. Diamante Azul had been trying to move up the ranks since being reintroduced as Diamante Azul in March, 2012. In the end Diamante pinned Guerrero to win the 2012 Leyenda de Azul tournament. Diamante Azul's resemblance to Blue Demon was extremely obvious as Diamante Azul held up the Leyenda de Azul' plaque with Blue Demon's mask on it. Following the match Diamante Azul stated that he wanted to challenge Volador Jr. to a match where both their masks were on the line.

==== Leyenda de Azul order of elimination ====
#	Eliminated	Eliminated by	Time
1	Misterioso, Jr.	Brazo de Plata	
2	Diamante	Euforia	
3	Kráneo	Diamante Azul	
4	Brazo de Plata	El Terrible	
5	Rush	El Terrible (double elimination)	
5	El Terrible	Rush (double elimination)	
7	Marco Corleone	Euforia and Último Guerrero	
8	Tama Tonga	Atlantis and Shocker	
9	Shocker	Mr. Águila	
10	Euforia	La Sombra	
11	Mr. Águila	Atlantis	
12	La Sombra	Volador Jr.	
13	Atlantis	Último Guerrero	
14	Volador Jr.	Diamante Azul	
15	Último Guerrero	Diamante Azul	
16	Diamante Azul	Winner	

=== Main Event ===
The main event match marked the first time Místico La Nueva Era worked a main event match on CMLL Super Viernes after having made his debut as that character in August, 2012. Místico teamed up with Titán and Máscara Dorada to take on a team that the original Místico had a long running feud with, Los Hijos del Averno (Averno, Ephesto, Mephisto). In the end Mephisto grew frustrated with his inability to ground Místico and brought the match to an end when he landed a low blow on Místico in clear view of the referee, drawing a disqualification for his team, giving Místico not just his first main event, but his first main event victory.

=== Results ===
No.	Results	Stipulations
1	Bobby Zavala and Disturbio defeated Leono and Sensei	Best two out of three falls Tag team match
2	Fuego, Starman, Tritón defeated Los Guerreros Tuareg (Arkangel de la Muerte and Skándalo) and Okumura	Six-man tag team match
3	La Amapola defeated León (c)	Best two out of three falls match for the Reina-CMLL International Championship
4	Diamante Azul defeated Atlantis, La Sombra, Marco Corleone, Brazo de Plata, Shocker, Rush, Diamante, El Terrible, Euforia, Kráneo, Volador Jr., Tama Tonga, Último Guerrero, Mr. Águila, Misterioso Jr.	2012 Leyenda de Azul Torneo cibernetico
5	Máscara Dorada, Místico, Titán defeated Los Hijos del Averno (Averno, Ephesto, Mephisto) by disqualification	Six-man tag team match
(c) / – the champion(s) heading into the match

== October 19, 2012 ==
CMLL Super Viernes
- Promotional poster for the October 19 Super Viernes event
- Promotion: Consejo Mundial de Lucha Libre (CMLL)
- Date: October 19, 2012
- City: Mexico City, Mexico
- Venue: Arena México

CMLL Super Viernes chronology
← Previous; Super Viernes October 12, 2012	Next → Super Viernes October 26, 2012

Mexican Professional wrestling promotion Consejo Mundial de Lucha Libre's (CMLL) October 19, 2012 Super Viernes show featured six wrestling matches in total. The Main Event was a Best two out of three falls Six-man tag team match, which was a result of a long running storyline between former and current members of the Los Guerreros del Infierno group. Current members Euforia, Niebla Roja and Último Guerrero took on former members Dragón Rojo, Jr. and Rey Escorpión, who teamed up with New Japan Pro-Wrestling (NJPW) visitor Tama Tonga for the match. In the semi main event Místico La Nueva Era teamed up with Ángel de Oro and La Máscara to face the Los Hijos del Averno group (Averno, Ephesto, Mephisto), who were arch rivals of the Original Místico. The show featured four additional matches on the undercard.

=== Event ===
The opening match was the first match for Metálico since the Super Viernes September 28, 2012 show where he hurt his knee. Metálico teamed up with Molotov to take on Los Hombres del Camoflaje ("Men in Camouflage", Artillero and Super Comando). Los Hombres did not take it easy on Metálico, stealing his mask in the third fall, getting themselves disqualified in the process. In Lucha libre stealing a mask or tearing a mask up is often one of the first steps in a longer running storylines. In the second match the CMLL World Mini-Estrella Champion Pequeño Olímpico teamed up with veteran rudos ("bad guys") Pequeño Violencia and Pequeño Black Warrior to take on the much less experienced Acero and Pequeño Halcón, teaming with Shockercito. The experience of the rudo team was too much to overcome as Pequeño Olímpico led his team to a two falls to one victory. The third match of the evening proved that the seasoned veteran Brazo de Plata was still a crowd favorite as the fans in attendance cheered loudly for Brazo de Plata as he, Máscara Dorada and Shocker defeated the team of Black Warrior and Mr. Águila, two-thirds of the reigning Mexican National Trios Champions and Puma King.

The one fall Lightning match between Máximo and Rey Bucanero started out slowly, with Rey Bucanero refusing to even enter the ring, disgusted by his opponent's overly flamboyant Exótico actions, including trying to kiss Bucanero. Once the match actually started Maximo tried to kiss his opponent on at least two occasions, with the attempts angering Rey Bucanero so much that he angrily attacked Maximo, defeating him in under six minutes. In the fifth match of the night Místico La Nueva Era teamed up with Ángel de Oro and La Máscara to take on Los Hijos del Averno (Averno, Ephesto, Mephisto), a group that often fought the original Místico when he worked for CMLL. The Rudo team quickly overwhelmed Místico, Ángel de Oro and La Mascara as Mephisto pinned Místico mere minutes into the match. The tecnico team fought back in the second fall as they evened the score between the two teams. In the third fall Averno fell victim to Místico and moments later La Nueva Era pinned Mephisto to win the match for his team.

=== Main Event ===
The animosity between the two factions involved in the main event was evident from the start as especially Último Guerrero and Rey Escorpión attacked each other. Guerrero's back up, in the form of the remaining members of Los Guerreros del Infierno, consisted of Euforia and Niebla Roja while Escorpión had Dragón Rojo, Jr. and Tama Tonga on his side. Los Guerreros lost the first fall, but came back for the second fall, not even waiting for the official announcement, the match went to the floor where the metal guardrails were used repeatedly and masks were ripped open. Los Guerrero's took the second fall. During the third fall Niebla Rojo tried to executed a spinning leap out of the ring, but missed his opponent and ended up hurt so badly from the move that he had to be removed from the arena on a stretcher. In the end Escorpión landed a foul on Guerrero and saw his team disqualified. Escorpión and Dragón Rojo, Jr. did not seem particularly bothered by the loss as they stole Último Guerrero and destroyed it in the middle of the ring.

=== Results ===
No.	Results	Stipulations	Times
1	Metálico and Molotov defeated Los Hombres del Camoflaje (Artillero and Super Comando) by disqualification	Best two out of three falls Tag team match	—
2	Pequeño Olímpico, Pequeño Violencia and Pequeño Black Warrior defeated Acero, Pequeño Halcón and Shockercito	Six-man tag team match	—
3	Máscara Dorada, Shocker and Brazo de Plata defeated Black Warrior, Mr. Águila and Puma King	Six-man tag team match	—
4	Rey Bucanero defeated Máximo	Lightning match (One fall, 10 minute time-limit match)	05:53
5	Ángel de Oro, La Máscara and Místico La Nueva Era defeated Los Hijos del Averno (Averno, Ephesto, Mephisto)	Six-man tag team match	—
6	Dragón Rojo Jr., Rey Escorpión and Tama Tonga defeated Los Guerreros del Infierno (Euforia, Niebla Roja and Último Guerrero) by disqualification	Six-man tag team match	—

== October 26, 2012 ==
CMLL Super Viernes
- Promotional poster for the October 26 Super Viernes event
- Promotion: Consejo Mundial de Lucha Libre (CMLL)
- Date: October 26, 2012
- City: Mexico City, Mexico
- Venue: Arena México

CMLL Super Viernes chronology
← Previous; Super Viernes October 19, 2012	Next → Super Viernes November 2, 2012

Mexican Professional wrestling promotion Consejo Mundial de Lucha Libre's (CMLL) October 26, 2012 Super Viernes show featured six wrestling matches in total. The main event was a rematch of the previous week's main event match between Los Guerreros del Infierno (Euforia, Niebla Roja and Último Guerrero) and former Los Guerreos members Dragón Rojo, Jr. and Rey Escorpión, teaming up with Tama Tonga. The show included five additional matches including three Best two out of three falls Six-man tag team matches, a tag team match and a Lightning match.

=== Event ===
According to the poster for the event the opening match of the show was supposed to see Tigre Blanco team up with Camaleón for a tag team match, but Robin worked the match against Bobby Zavala and Disturbio instead of Tigre Blanco. Zavala and Disturbio had teamed on a regular basis as far back as 2011 and their experience showed as they defeated Camaleón and Robin two falls to one. In the second match a new rivalry continued to develop between the rudo (someone who portrays a "bad guy") Skándalo and tecnico ("Good guy") Starman. The two faced off on opposite sides two weeks earlier during the October 12, 2012 Super Viernes, with only a hint at any kind of storyline issues between the two. Skándalo teamed with his fellow Los Guerreros Tuaregs Arkangel de la Muerte and Hooligan while Starman teamed up with Pegasso and Tritón. The tecnico team won the first fall when Tritón pinned Arkangel de la Muerte after successfully executing a high risk move off the top rope called a 450° splash. In the second fall Skándalo cost his team the match when he intentionally pulled Starman's mask off, which is an automatic disqualification in Lucha Libre if the referee sees it done. The third match was Dark Angel first Arena México in two months, due to her touring Japan for a long period of time. She teamed with Goya Kong and Marcela facing off against La Amapola, La Comandante and Tiffany. Lady Apache was originally supposed to team with La Amapola and La Comandante but was replaced without any official explanation. Dark Angel and her team won the first fall, while La Amapola's team won the second fall. The third fall was decided after Goya Kong landed a Big splash on La Comandante and pinned her. In the Lighting match rising tecnico Diamante Azul faced off against experienced mid-card rudo Misterioso, Jr. Diamante Azul needed only five minutes and 36 seconds of the ten-minute time limit to pin Misterioso, Jr. following his trademark high impact German Suplex. In the semi-final match the tecnico trio of veteran Brazo de Plata, Máscara Dorada and Titán faced off against a trio representing three of CMLL's rudo factions as El Felino (from La Peste Negra), Mephisto (from Los Hijos del Averno) and Psicosis (representing Los Invasores. The rudo trio won the first fall of the match, but lost both the second and third fall as Máscara Dorada pinned El Felino and Brazo de Oro pinned Psicosis to take the victory for their team.

=== Main Event ===
The main event was the continuation of several weeks of physical encounters and months of storyline development and was a rematch from the previous week as Los Guerreros del Infierno (Led by Último Guerrero and joined by Euforia and Niebla Roja) who faced off against former Los Guerreros members Dragón Rojo, Jr. and Rey Escorpión, backed up by Tama Tonga, representing New Japan Pro-Wrestling (NJPW). The former Los Guerreros and Tonga jumped Los Guerreros before the bell rang, setting the tone for the match. Los Guerreros were disqualified for intentionally throwing Dragón Rojo, Jr. over the top rope, to the floor, something which is not allowed according to CMLL rules. In the second fall Rey Escorpión outwitted his former mentor as Escorpión pulled Último Guerrero's mask off and then took advantage of the distraction to pin Guerrero. Rey Escorpión's team won two falls in straight and two weeks in a row. Following the match Último Guerrero made a challenge for a singles match between himself and Rey Escorpión for the following week's show. A challenge that was accepted and booked as the main event of the November 2, 2012 Super Viernes show.

=== Results ===
No.	Results	Stipulations	Times
1	Bobby Zavala and Disturbio defeated Camaleón and Robin	Best two out of three falls Tag team match	—
2	Pegasso, Starman and Tritón defeated Los Guerreros Tuareg (Arkangel de la Muerte, Hooligan and Skándalo) by disqualification	Six-man tag team match	—
3	Dark Angel, Goya Kong and Marcela defeated La Amapola, La Comandante and Tiffany	Six-man tag team match	—
4	Diamante Azul defeated Misterioso Jr.	Lightning match (One fall, 10 minute time-limit match)	05:36
5	Máscara Dorada, Brazo de Plata and Titán defeated El Felino, Mephisto and Psicosis	Six-man tag team match	—
6	Dragón Rojo, Jr., Rey Escorpión and Tama Tonga defeated Los Guerreros del Infierno (Euforia, Niebla Roja and Último Guerrero)	Six-man tag team match	—
