= Horus (wrestler) =

Mexican professional wrestler

Personal information
- Born: Moisés Neftalí Vargas; November 28, 1982 (age 43) Guadalajara, Jalisco, Mexico

Professional wrestling career
- Ring name(s): El Hijo del Faraón; Horus/Höruz; Hijo de Rey Misterio; Rey Salomón, Jr.
- Billed height: 1.77 m (5 ft 9 1/2 in)
- Billed weight: 90 kg (198 lb)
- Trained by: Flash; Gran Cochisse; Arturo Beristain; El Satanico; Franco Colombo; Arkangel de la Muerte; Virus
- Debut: June 17, 2007

Moisés Neftalí Vargas (born November 28, 1982, in Guadalajara, Jalisco, Mexico) is a Mexican professional wrestler, better known under the ring name Horus, sometimes spelled Höruz. He has also performed under the name Rey Salomón, Jr. after his father who for a while wrestled as Rey Salomón. Vargas is a third-generation wrestler, grandson of José Ángel Vargas Sánchez, better known as lucha libre legend Ángel Blanco.

For years he worked for the Mexican promotion Consejo Mundial de Lucha Libre (CMLL) portraying a tecnico ("good guy") wrestling character, but left the CMLL in 2013. Vargas originally worked under a mask, but was unmasked after losing a match in November 2013. He has also worked under the ring name Hijo de Faraón (Son of El Faraón) as well as a stint under the name El Hijo de Rey Misterio in Bolivia.

== Personal life ==
Neftali is a third-generation wrestler, the grandson of José Ángel Vargas Sánchez, better known under the ring name Ángel Blanco ("White Angel") and the son of Salomón Meza who has worked both as Ángel Blanco, Jr. and Rey Salomón (King Solomon). He is the nephew of the second person to wrestle as Ángel Blanco, Jr. as well as the nephew of Hijo del Ángel Blanco I and II. He originally considered working under the name "El Niete de Ángel Blanco", or "The Grandson of Ángel Blanco", but felt that there were too many people already using the "Ángel Blanco" name. Through his exposure as a wrestler Horus does a lot of work for charities, especially children's hospitals and children's shelter in and around Mexico City.

== Professional wrestling career ==
Moisés Neftalí traveled to Mexico City to train under Gran Cochisse for his professional wrestling career. He initially worked under the ring name "Rey Salomón, Jr." after his father. He started attending Consejo Mundial de Lucha Libre (CMLL) wrestling school, taking lessons from Arturo Beristain, El Satanico, Franco Colombo, Arkangel de la Muerte and Virus

=== Hijo de Faraón (2007–2009) ===
In mid-2007 he was introduced to the CMLL audience as "El Hijo del Faraón" ("The Son of the Phaero"), with the storyline being that he was the son of retired professional wrestler El Faraón who presented El Hijo del Faraón with his mask on his debut. El Faraón was his godfather and allowed him to use the ring name. He made his debut as part of Generacion del 75, ("Generation 75"), a number of young wrestlers who made their CMLL debut in 2009, in CMLL's 75th year of operation. As El Hijo del Faraón he competed in the Generacion del 75 torneo cibernetico, multi man elimination match. The match was won by El Hijo del Fantasma and also included Ángel Azteca, Jr., Astro Boy, Axxel, Bronco, Diamante Negro, Metalik, Puma King, Skándalo, Tiger Kid and Vangelis. He would work as El Hijo del Faraón until early 2009 where he gave up the name. He explained that he wanted to create his own identity instead of living off his godfather's name and image.

=== El Hijo de Rey Misterio (2009) ===
During his absence from CMLL he traveled to Bolivia where he worked as Rey Misterio, Jr. intentionally imitating the World Wrestling Entertainment wrestler. It was not uncommon for some promoters to have El Hijo de Rey Misterio misrepresented as his more famous cousin, but in this case, they had someone totally unrelated play the role.

=== Horus (2009–present) ===
He made his return to CMLL on June 2, 2009, repackaged as "Horus" (sometimes spelled Höruz), acknowledging that he used to be "Hijo del Faraón", but giving him his own unique ring character. Horus' name, mask, and wrestling gear was inspired by the Ancient Egyptian god Horus, their god of the sky and flight. Late on his ring gear design was tweaked to be primarily white and incorporate various angelic design features to reference both his grandfather and father's Ángel Blanco ring characters. Horus generally works in the first or second match of CMLL's major shows, having yet to give the breakthrough performance that would move him up the ranks of CMLL's hierarchy. Hombre Bala Jr. was one of 18 wrestlers who competed in the second annual Torneo Sangre Nueva tournament, a tournament for young or low ranking wrestlers. He competed in qualifying Block A on February 26, 2012, for a place in the finals, the other wrestlers in Block A included Soberano Jr., Camaleón, Stigma, Hombre Bala Jr., Akuma, Espanto, Jr., Herodes, Jr., Cholo and Bobby Zavala who competed in a torneo cibernetico, multi-man elimination match. He eliminated Akuma, but was later eliminated himself due to an injury he suffered during a dive. It was later revealed that he suffered a knee injury, an injury that was believed to keep him out of the ring for three months.

On November 30, 2013, Horus was defeated by his uncle Ángel Blanco, Jr. in a Lucha de Apuestas and was, as a result, forced to unmask and reveal his real name.

== Luchas de Apuestass record ==
Winner (wager)	Loser (wager)	Location	Event	Date	Notes
Ángel Blanco Jr. (mask)	Horus (mask)	Mexico City	Live event	November 30, 2013	
