= Herodes Jr. =

Mexican professional wrestler

Personal information
- Born: September 18, 1990 (age 35) San Nicolás de los Garza, Nuevo Leon, Mexico
- Parent: Herodes (father)
- Relatives: Sangre Chicana (uncle); Águila Solitaria (uncle); Lluvia (cousin); La Hiedra (cousin)

Professional wrestling career
- Ring name(s): Rebelde; Herodes Jr.
- Billed height: 1.77 m (5 ft 9 1/2 in)
- Billed weight: 90 kg (198 lb)
- Trained by: Mr. Lince; El Hijo del Gladiador
- Debut: 2009

Herodes Jr. (born September 18, 1990) is a Mexican professional wrestler, best known for working for the Mexican promotion Consejo Mundial de Lucha Libre (CMLL) portraying a rudo ("bad guy") wrestling character. He is the son of Víctor Manuel Góngora Cisneros, who wrestled as "Herodes" and also has a brother who is a professional wrestler under the name "Maquina Asesina"

== Professional wrestling career ==
Herodes Jr. is a second-generation wrestler, the son of retired professional wrestler "Víctor Manuel Góngora Cisneros" who wrestled under the ring names Herodes and El Boricua over the years. His brother is also a professional wrestler, working as the enmascarado (Masked character) Maquina Asesina. He is the nephew of Sangre Chicana and the cousin of Chicana's sons who wrestle as Sangre Chicana Jr. and Perseus and his daughter known as Lluvia. He made his professional wrestling debut in 2009 and primarily worked on the Mexican Independent circuit under the enmascarado name Rebelde, not revealing his relationship to his father at the time. In 2011 he began training at the Consejo Mundial de Lucha Libre (CMLL) wrestling school in the hopes of making his CMLL debut.

=== Consejo Mundial de Lucha Libre (2012–2014) ===
In the summer of 2012 CMLL introduced as Generacion 2012, which was not a team as such, but more the "graduating class" from the CMLL wrestling school. One of the wrestlers in Generacion 2012 was Herodes Jr. working without a mask and openly admitting to being the son of Herodes. The Generacion 2012 class also included Oro Jr., Taurus, Genesis, Guerrero Negro Jr., Espanto Jr. and Akuma. Herodes Jr. wrestled his first CMLL match on August 12, 2012 teaming with Los Hombres del Camoflaje (Artillero and Super Comando) as the trio lost to the team of Camaleón, Pegasso and Sensei. On January 4, 2013 he made his debut on CMLL's main weekly show and the most important one in terms of promotional focus, CMLL Super Viernes, teaming with Inquisidor as the team defeated Camaleón and Oro Jr. two falls to one. In March 2013 Herodes Jr. was one of 18 wrestlers who competed in the annual Torneo Sangre Nueva ("New Blood Tournament"), a tournament for young or low ranking wrestlers. He competed in qualifying block A on February 26, 2013 for a place in the finals, the other wrestlers in Block A included Soberano Jr., Camaleón, Stigma, Höruz, Hombre Bala Jr., Akuma, Espanto Jr., Cholo and Bobby Zavala who competed in a torneo cibernetico, multi-man elimination match. Herodes Jr. eliminated Camaleón during the match but was himself pinned by Stigma after just over 16 minutes of wrestling. In late March, 2013 Herodes Jr. was announced as one of the Novatos, or rookies, in the 2013 Torneo Gran Alternativa, or "Great Alternative tournament". The Gran Alternativa pairs a rookie with an experienced wrestler for a tag team tournament. Herodes Jr. was teamed up with veteran wrestler El Terrible to compete in Block B of the tournament that took place on the April 19, 2013 Super Viernes show. The team lost in the first round to Soberano Jr. and La Sombra and was eliminated from the tournament. In January 2014, Herodes Jr. came together with Bárbaro Cavernario and Mr. Niebla to form a new version of La Peste Negra. On August 6, Herodes Jr. announced his departure from CMLL.

== Championships and accomplishments ==
- International Wrestling Revolution Group

- IWRG Junior de Juniors Championship (1 time)
