= Bronco (wrestler) =

Mexican professional wrestler

Personal information
- Born: December 26, 1989 (age 36) Gomez Palacio, Durango, Mexico

Professional wrestling career
- Ring name: Bronco
- Billed height: 1.92 m (6 ft 3 1/2 in)
- Billed weight: 103 kg (227 lb)
- Trained by: Lizmark; Ringo Mendoza; Franco Colombo
- Debut: 2008

Bronco (born December 26, 1989, in Gómez Palacio, Durango, Mexico) is a Mexican professional wrestler currently working for the Mexican promotion Consejo Mundial de Lucha Libre (CMLL) portraying a rudo ("bad guy") wrestling character. Bronco's real name is not a matter of public record, as is often the case with masked wrestlers in Mexico where their private lives are kept a secret from the wrestling fans.

== Professional wrestling career ==
In Mexico, as part of the wrestling style called lucha libre, it is traditional to keep the true identify of a masked wrestler a secret, not revealing their real names and oftentimes not revealing what previous ring names they have competed under. No previous ring identities have been confirmed for Bronco and it has been stated that his Consejo Mundial de Lucha Libre (CMLL) debut was also his professional debut, but with the traditions of Lucha Libre it is entirely possible that his debut date is for that of his ring character, not him personally, which means could have worked under other names before that point in time. Bronco was introduced as part of Generacion del 75, a group of wrestlers that all made their in-ring, or CMLL debut in 2008, the 75th year of CMLL. Besides Bronco the group included Axxel, Flash, Mictlán, Hijo del Faraón, El Hijo del Fantasma, Metalik, Puma King, Skándalo, Super Nova and Tiger Kid. Following the introduction of Generacion del 75 Astro Boy, Ángel Azteca, Jr., Vangelis and Diamante Negro was also mentioned when talking about Generaction del 75. Bronco teamed up with fellow Generaction del 75'er Diamante Negro to enter a tournament to determine the next holders of the CMLL Arena Coliseo Tag Team Championship, after the championship had been inactive for a number of years. The duo defeated Loco Max and Vangelis in the first round, then defeated Fabian el Gitano and Mictlán to qualify for the semi-final where they lost to eventual tournament winners Flash and Stuka, Jr. The following month Bronco entered the 2008 Gran Alternativa tournament, a tournament where a rookie and a veteran teams up for the night. Bronco was paired with Mr. Niebla for the tournament. The duo defeated the team of the experienced Villano V and rookie Puma King, only to lose to Dos Caras, Jr. and Metalik in the semi-final round of the tournament. CMLL held a 16 man tournament focusing primarily on rookies called Torneo Sangre Nueva ("The New Blood Tournament") in March of 2012. Some of the competitors did not really fit the "New Blood" tournaments, but in the case of wrestlers like Cancerbero and Raziel, the ring persona he portrayed had only been used for around 2 years, making the character a rookie, but not the man under the mask. CMLL has a history of not openly promoting the fact that some of their workers have worked under different identities previously. The tournament played out from March 6, 2012 until March 20, 2012 on CMLL's Tuesday shows in Arena Mexico. The first two shows had 8 wrestlers compete for a shot at the finals. The second block, took place on March 13, 2012 and saw Disturbio, Hombre Bala Jr., Raziel, and Tritón team up to face Robin, Bronco, Hijo del Signo, and Super Halcón Jr. Raziel won the match with Bronco being the third man eliminated in the nearly 25 minute long match. Bronco also participated in the 2012 Gran Alternativa tournament, once again teaming up with Mr. Niebla. The team defeated Brazo de Plata and Fuego in the first round of the tournament but lost to Atlantis and Tritón in the second round. Bronco was injured during a match in May 2012 and has not been active since then.

== The name "Bronco" in wrestling ==
At least three other people have used the ring name Bronco in professional wrestling

- Ulises Cantu Gutierrez – The first wrestler to use the name Bronco in Mexico
- Silver King – wrestled as "Bronco" for CMLL around 2005
- Ramón Álvarez – Dominican wrestler who wrestles as "El Bronco" / "Bronco I"
