= Torneo Sangre Nueva =

Mexican professional wrestling tournament

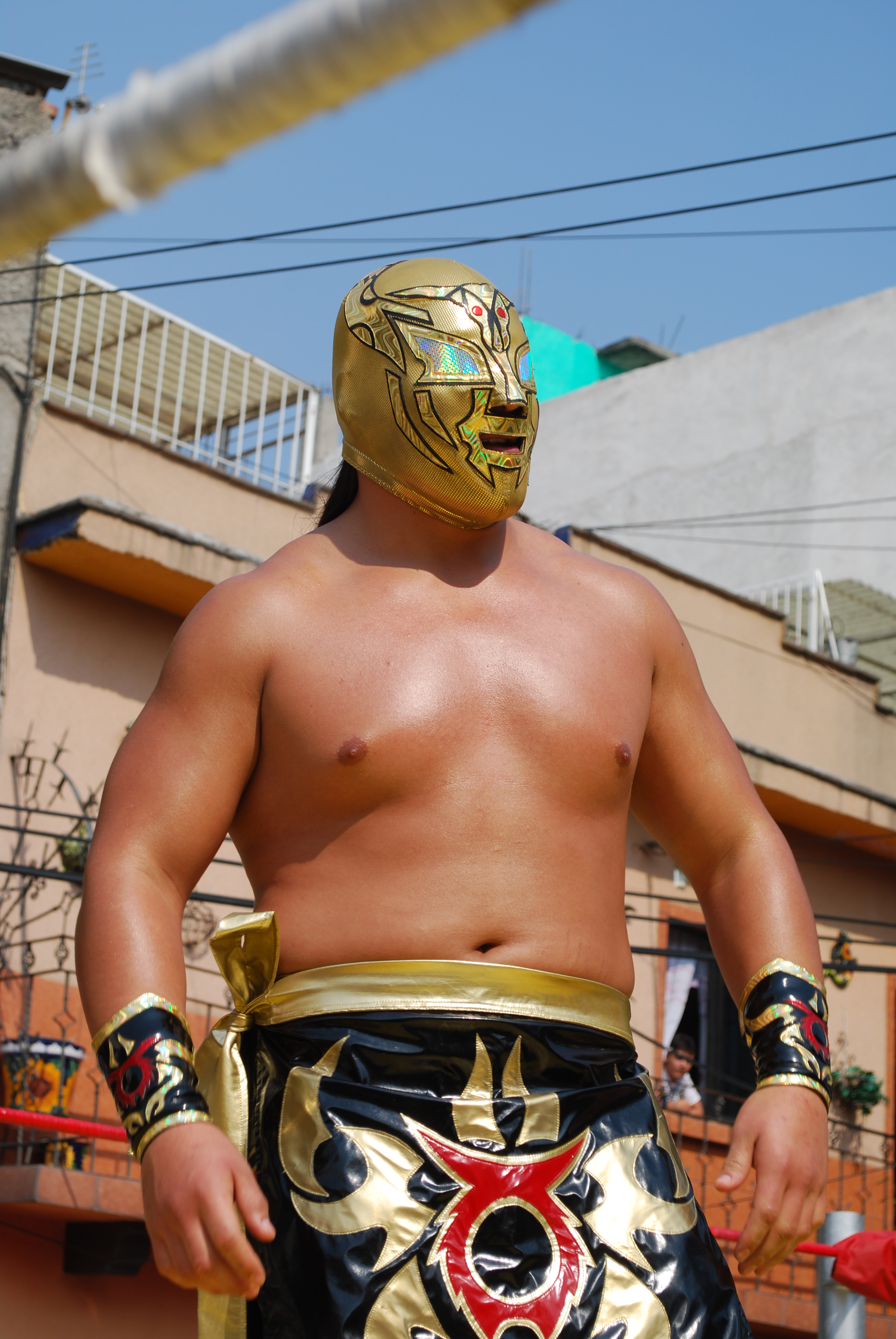
- Taurus, finalist in the 2013 Sangre Nueva tournament

Details
- Promotion: Consejo Mundial de Lucha Libre
- Date established: March 20, 2012
- Current champion: Soberano Jr.
- Date won: March 12, 2013
Statistics
- First champion: Dragon Lee
- Oldest champion: El Cholo (40 years, 56 days) (Competitor)
- Youngest champion: Soberano Jr. (18 years, 206 days)
- Heaviest champion: Bronco (103 kg (227 lb)) (Competitor)
- Lightest champion: Soberano Jr. (75 kg (165 lb))

Torneo Sangre Nueva ("The New Blood Tournament") is a professional wrestling tournament promoted by the Mexican lucha libre promotion Consejo Mundial de Lucha Libre (CMLL), first held in 2012. The tournament focuses primarily on younger wrestlers or wrestlers who work in the lower ranks of the promotion, generally the first or second match of the show, as a way to highlight or promote a wrestler up to a higher level of competition. A total of 27 individuals have competed in the two Sangre Nueva tournaments held as of 2014 with nine competitors participating in both tournaments held so far: Bobby Zavala, Camaleón, El Cholo, Disturbio, Hombre Bala Jr., Robin, Soberano Jr., Stigma and Super Halcón Jr. Soberano Jr. is both the youngest competitor over-all (18 years and 206 days old) and the youngest tournament winner as well (19 days and 198 days old), while Cholo is the oldest (40 years and 56 days) at the time of his second tournament participation. Soberano Jr. was the lightest competitor and champion at 75 kg (165 lb) while Bronco, at 103 kg (227 lb), was the heaviest of any tournament competitor so far.

== Sangre Nueva tournament winners ==
Year	Winner	Finalist	Date	Reference
2012	Dragon Lee	Raziel	March 20, 2012	
2013	Soberano Jr.	Taurus	March 12, 2013	

== Torneo Sangre Nueva 2012 ==
Torneo Sangre Nueva (2012)
- Promotion: Consejo Mundial de Lucha Libre
- Date: March 20, 2012
- City: Mexico City, Mexico
- Venue: Arena Mexico

Event chronology
← Previous; Homenaje a Dos Leyendas	Next → Torneo Gran Alternativa

Torneo Gran Alternativa chronology
← Previous; First	Next → 2013

The first ever Torneo Sangre Nueva took place in March 2012. Some of the competitors did not fit the "New Blood" tournaments, but in the case of wrestlers like Cancerbero and Raziel, the ring persona he portrayed had only been used for around 2 years, making the character a rookie, but not the man under the mask. CMLL has a history of not openly promoting the fact that some of their workers have worked under different identities previously. The tournament played out from March 6, 2012, until March 20, 2012, on CMLL's Tuesday shows in Arena Mexico. The first two shows had 8 wrestlers compete for a shot at the finals. Each night the eight wrestlers competed in a "Seeding" battle royal to determine the four on four Torneo cibernetico elimination match. On the first night El Cholo, Soberano Jr., Cancerbero, and Dragon Lee comprised one team while Bobby Zavala, Titán, Stigma and Camaleón on the other. Dragon Lee won the match, lastly eliminating Titán to win the match. The second block, on March 13, 2012 saw Disturbio, Hombre Bala Jr., Raziel, and Tritón team up to face Robin, Bronco, Hijo del Signo, and Super Halcón Jr. Raziel took the victory, eliminating Tritón to end the nearly 25 minute long match to move on to the finals. A week later, on March 20, 2012 Dragon Lee and Raziel faced off in the only three fall match of the night. Dragon Lee defeated Raziel to win the Torneo Sangre Nueva.

Cibernetico order of elimination

Block A				Block B			
No.	Eliminated	By	Time	No.	Eliminated	By	Time
1	El Cholo	Camaleón	08:11	1	Robin	Disturbio	11:06
2	Bobby Zavala	Cancerbero	08:48	2	Hombre Bala Jr.	Hijo del Signo	14:43
3	Soberano Jr.	Stigma	10:12	3	Bronco	Tritón	16:14
4	Camaleón	Dragon Lee	11:28	4	Disturbio	Super Halcón Jr.	17:17
5	Stigma	Cancerbero	12:08	5	Super Halcón Jr.	Raziel	18:54
6	Cancerbero	Titán	13:00	6	Hijo del Signo	Raziel	20:01
7	Titán	Dragon Lee	15:02	7	Tritón	Raziel	24:54
8	Winner	Dragon Lee	15:02	8	Winner	Raziel	24:54

Aftermath

On June 20, 2012, CMLL held a press conference, during which lucha libre priest Fray Tormenta announced that since Dragon Lee had impressed him with his in-ring performance, Fray Tormenta wanted Dragon Lee to take over the role of Místico, his storyline protégé. Lee immediately accepted Tormenta's offer and received his new mask to officially become the second incarnation of Místico, taking over the highly successful role following the character's original performer, who had signed with WWE in January 2011. Titán entered CMLL's En Busca de un Ídolo ("In search of an Idol") a few months after narrowly missing out on the Sangre Nueva tournament finals. The tournament used a point system that allowed fans to vote online, allowing Titán to advance to the second round despite only winning one of his four first round matches. The fan support propelled Titán to the finale where he defeated Euforia to win the tournament. Titán would later defeat En Busca de un Ídolo rival Pólvora to win the Mexican National Welterweight Championship Cholo, Bobby Zavala, Soberano Jr., Camaleón, Stigma, Robin, Disturbio and Super Halcón Jr. would all compete in the subsequent Torneo Sangre Nueva in 2013.

== Torneo Sangre Nueva 2013 ==
Torneo Sangre Nueva (2013)
- Promotion: Consejo Mundial de Lucha Libre
- Date: February 26, 2013
- City: Mexico City, Mexico
- Venue: Arena Mexico

Event chronology
← Previous; Torneo de Parejas Increíbles	Next → Homenaje a Dos Leyendas

Torneo Gran Alternativa chronology
← Previous; 2012	Next → —

On February 21, 2013, CMLL announced that they were holding another Torneo Sangre Nueva tournament in 2013, possibly making it an annual event. Like the first tournament the 2013 Sangre Nueva would feature two qualifying torneo cibernetico elimination matches with the winner of each facing off in a one-on-one match. In 2013 the cibernetico match included 10 competitors instead of the eight competitors in the previous year's tournament. The first match took place on February 26, 2013, in Arena Mexico and saw Soberano Jr. (son of CMLL wrestler Euforia) outlast Camaleón, Stigma, Höruz, Hombre Bala Jr., Akuma, Espanto Jr., Herodes Jr., Cholo and Bobby Zavala to qualify for the finals. During the match Höruz suffered a knee injury as a result of a dive out of the ring, the injury was believed to keep him out of the ring for three months. Block B competed on March 5, 2013, for the other finalist spot, with a field that included Genesis, Oro Jr., Robin, Sensei, Super Halcón Jr., Disturbio, Guerrero Negro Jr., Inquisidor, Taurus and Zayco. As with the 2012 Torneo Sangre Nueva, not everyone competing in the tournament fit the "new blood" description; Sensei had worked for CMLL under that ring persona since 2005 and been a professional wrestler even longer. Inquisidor made his professional wrestling in 1995, but only adopted the Inquisidor name and mask in 2008, with CMLL officially not acknowledging his past before becoming Inquisidor. The second Cibernetico was won by Taurus, son of Último Guerrero when he was the last wrestler in the ring, eliminating Guerrero Negro Jr. to earn his spot in the finals for the following week. The following week, Sobereano Jr. defeated Taurus, two falls to one to win the 2013 Sangre Nueva tournament.

Cibernetico order of elimination

Block A				Block B			
No.	Eliminated	By	Time	No.	Eliminated	By	Time
1	Akuma	Höruz	10:00	1	Genesis	Zayco	
2	Cholo	Camaleón	11:34	2	Inquisidor	Sensei	
3	Höruz	Injury	13:29	3	Zayco	Super Halcón Jr.	
4	Camaleón	Herodes Jr.	14:17	4	Robin	Guerrero Negro Jr.	
5	Espanto Jr.	Hombre Bala Jr.	15:00	5	Oro Jr.	Disturbio	
6	Herodes Jr.	Stigma	16:06	6	Sensei	Taurus	
7	Stigma	Bobby Zavala	17:29	7	Super Halcón Jr.	Guerrero Negro Jr.	
8	Bobby Zavala	Hombre Bala Jr.	21:17	8	Disturbio	Guerrero Negro Jr.	
9	Hombre Bala Jr.	Soberano Jr.	26:49	9	Guerrero Negro Jr.	Taurus	
10	Winner	Soberano Jr.	26:49	10	Winner	Taurus	

== Sangre Nueva Tournament Participants ==
Name	Tournaments	Year(s)
Akuma	1	2013
Bronco	1	2012
Camaleón	2	2012, 2013
Cancerbero	1	2012
Cholo	2	2012, 2013
Disturbio	2	2012, 2013
Dragon Lee	1	2012
Espanto Jr.	1	2013
Genesis	1	2013
Guerrero Negro Jr.	1	2013
Herodes Jr.	1	2013
Hijo del Signo	1	2012
Hombre Bala Jr.	2	2012, 2013
Höruz	1	2013
Inquisidor	1	2013
Oro Jr.	1	2013
Raziel	1	2012
Robin	2	2012, 2013
Sensei	1	2013
Soberano Jr.	2	2012, 2013
Stigma	2	2012, 2013
Super Halcón Jr.	2	2012, 2013
Taurus	1	2013
Titán	1	2012
Tritón	1	2012
Bobby Zavala	2	2012, 2013
Zayco	1	2013
