= Hijo del Signo =

Mexican professional wrestler

Personal information
- Born: Marco Antonio Sánchez Rodríguez; April 30, 1987 (age 39)

Professional wrestling career
- Ring name(s): Hijo del Signo; Signo Jr.
- Billed height: 1.75 m (5 ft 9 in)
- Billed weight: 85 kg (187 lb)
- Trained by: El Signo; Gory Cortes; Bestia Magnifica; Viento Negro; Black Terry; Arkangel de la Muerte; Franco Colombo; Shocker
- Debut: February 2, 2008

Marco Antonio Sánchez Rodríguez (born April 30, 1987) better known by his ring name El Hijo del Signo or Signo Jr., is a Mexican professional wrestler best known for working for the Mexican promotion Consejo Mundial de Lucha Libre (CMLL) portraying a rudo ("Bad guy") wrestling character. Hijo del Signo's real name was not a matter of public record, as is often the case with masked wrestlers in Mexico, where their private lives are kept a secret from the wrestling fans, until he lost the mask on December 25, 2017, to Starman. His ring name is Spanish for "Son of the Sign", based on the ring name of his father El Signo.

== Personal life ==
Prior to his unmasking, Hijo del Signo's full name was not publicly known, which is traditionally the case in his country when a wrestler has never been unmasked, but it is known that his paternal last name is Sánchez, revealed when his father Antonio Sánchez Rendón, best known under the ring name El Signo, was unmasked.

== Professional wrestling career ==
Hijo del Signo made his professional wrestling debut in early 2008 after training under his father as well as Gory Cortes, Bestia Magnifica, Viento Negro and Black Terry He was victorious in his first match, defeating a Mexican wrestler called Maytor. He was able to work on a number of high-profile independent circuit wrestling shows through his father's connections, including a benefit show for Kato Kung Lee. He also competed in a 2009 Torneo Novatos (Rookies Tournament) torneo cibernetico elimination match, although he did not win the tournament. He competed for the 2009 Toryumon Mexico's Young Dragons Cup, losing to eventual tournament winner Trauma II. Hijo del Signo became an International Wrestling Revolution Group (IWRG) regular, working their 2010 Torneo Relampago de Proyeccion a Nuevas Promesas de la Lucha Libre ("Projecting a new promise lightning tournament"), a tag team tournament where a rookie teams up with an experienced wrestler. Hijo del Signo was teamed up with Dr. Cerebro for the tournament, defeating Imperial and Rocket in the first round and then Guizmo and Ultraman Jr. in the second round. The team continued their success by defeating Oficial 911 and Comando Negro in the finals to win the tournament. On March 19, 2010, Hijo del Signo was one of 38 wrestlers to enter the Copa Amigo Por Siempre elimination match, a match that included such Lucha Libre names as El Canek, Oficial AK-47, Axxel, Guerrero Maya Jr., Máscara Año 2000 Jr., Rey Cometa, Scorpio Jr., Tinieblas and Tinieblas Jr. The tournament was won by El Canek. On May 1, 2010, El Signo officially retired from professional wrestling, holding a special retirement show in Arena Neza, Ciudad Nezahualcoyotl, State of Mexico. In the main event of the show Hijo del Signo won a 10-man steel cage match, defeating Halcón Dorado Jr. as the last man, forcing Dorado Jr. to have his hair shaved off after the match per the stipulation of the match.

=== Consejo Mundial de Lucha Libre (2011–2021) ===
CMLL introduced Generacion 2011 in early 2011 which a group of young wrestlers who all made their debut around the same time, they were not considered an actual group, more of a graduating class of the CMLL wrestling schools. Generacion 2011 included Hijo del Signo., Magnus, Dragon Lee, Enrique Vera Jr., Super Halcón Jr., Hombre Bala Jr. and Boby Zavala. Hijo del Signo made his CMLL in-ring debut on December 28, 2010, teaming with Puma King and Tiger Kid, losing to the team of Enrique Vera Jr., Metal Blanco and Palacio Negro. Hijo del Signo entered the 2011 Torneo Gran Alternativa, teaming up with the veteran Mr. Niebla. In the first round they defeated Ángel de Plata and Blue Panther, in the second round they lost to Diamante and La Sombra. CMLL held a Forjando un Ídolo (Spanish for "Forgin an idol") tournament in April and May 2011, with the purpose of identifying which of the 16 "Rookies" in the tournament would move up the ranks of the promotion. The tournament consisted of two rounds, first a round-robin group round, with the top 2 in each of the four groups competing in an elimination tournament. Hijo del Signo defeated Puma King and Hombre Bala Jr., only losing to Diamante in the first round, earning him six points, enough to advance to the second round. In the elimination round Hijo del Signo was defeated by Pólvora. He also appeared on the CMLL 78th Anniversary Show, CMLL's biggest show of the year, in an unsuccessful bid to win the 2011 Leyenda de Plata ("Silver Legend") tournament. Hijo del Signo was one of 18 wrestlers competing in the Mexico City version of the 2012 Reyes del Aire ("Kings of the Air") tournament, but did not win it. CMLL held a 16-man tournament focusing primarily on rookies called Torneo Sangre Nueva ("The New Blood Tournament") in March 2012 which saw Hijo del Signo. among the participants. The second block competed on March 13, 2012, and included Disturbio, Hombre Bala Jr., Raziel, and Tritón team up to face Robin, Bronco, Hijo del Signo and Super Halcon. Jr. Raziel took the victory, eliminating Tritón to end the nearly 25 minute long match to move on to the finals. Hijo del Signo competed in the 2012 Torneo Gran Alternativa, a tag team tournament that sees a rookie randomly teamed up with an experienced wrestler for a tournament, in this case Hijo del Signo teamed up with El Felino, losing in the first round to Raziel and Volador Jr. The Mexico City Boxing and Wrestling commission endorsed a number of tournaments over the summer of 2012 to crown a number Distrito Federal (Mexico City) Championships. On April 15, 2012, Hijo del Signo defeated Tritón in a tournament final to win his first wrestling championship, the Distrito Federal Middlweight Championship.

In early 2013 Hijo del Signo became involved in a storyline feud against the veteran tecnico ("good guy" character) Metálico, a storyline that saw Hijo del Signo cheat more than once to defeat Metálico in various six-man tag team matches. The two found themselves on opposites sides of a match at the Arena Coliseo 70th Anniversary Show on April 7, 2013, with Metálico teaming up with Hombre Bala Jr. and Super Halcón Jr. while El Hijo del Signo teamed up with Nosferatu and Taurus. The storyline between Hijo del Signo and Metálico took center stage during the match as most of the action centered around the two. In the second fall Hijo del Signo pulled Metálico's mask off, hoping to use the distraction to gain a pinfall, but instead he was disqualified when the referee saw the blatant rulebreaking by El Hijo del Signo. The storyline between the two was also featured a number of other shows throughout March and April, including a one-on-one match on CMLL's Super Viernes show, their main weekly show and an indicator that CMLL is escalating the storyline between the two. At the Arena Mexico 57th Anniversary Show Hijo del Signo teamed up with Los Guerreros Tuareg (Arkangel de la Muerte and Skándalo) to defeat Metálico, Sensei and Soberano Jr. with El Hijo del Signo scoring the deciding pinfall on Metálico. On Christmas Day, 2017, Hijo del Signo lost his mask in a Infierno en el Ring cage match to Starman, thus revealing his real name & face.

In late 2018, El Hijo del Signo and Yago became involved in a storyline feud against fellow rudos Camorra and Akuma. The two sides faced off in various matches through November and December and often involved either Akuma's or Yago's mask being torn. The feud led to a tag team Lucha de Apuestas, or "Bet match" where Akuma and Yago put their masks on the line and Camorra and El Hijo del Signo bet their hair on the outcome of the match. The match took place on January 1, 2019, as part of CMLL's annual Sin PIedad and saw El Hijo del Signo and Yago win the match. After the match Camorra was shaved bald while Akuma was forced to remove his mask and reveal his real name, Jose Luis Florenico Matinez. His last match for CMLL was a trios win on September 21, 2021.

== Championships and accomplishments ==
- Comisión de Box y Lucha Libre Mexico Distrito Federal
  - Distrito Federal Middleweight Championship (1 time, current)
- International Wrestling Revolution Group
  - Torneo Relampago de Proyeccion a Nuevas Promesas de la Lucha Libre 2010 Tournament – with Dr. Cerebro

== Luchas de Apuestas record ==
Winner (wager)	Loser (wager)	Location	Event	Date	Notes
Hijo del Signo (mask)	Halcón Dorado Jr. (hair)	Nezahualcóyotl, State of Mexico	Homenaje y Despedida al 'Misionero de la Muerte' El Signo	May 1, 2010	(Note: Steel cage match that also included Ultramán Jr., Rambo, Tauro de Creta, Fishman Jr., El Hijo del Solar, El Hijo del Canek, El Signo and Villano IV.)
Starman (mask)	Hijo del Signo (mask)	Mexico City, Mexico	Sin Salida	December 25, 2017	(Note: 10 man steel cage match that also included Star Jr., Oro Jr., Templario, Fiero, Nitro, Raziel and Cancerbero)
Yago (mask); El Hijo del Signo (hair)	Akuma (mask); Camorra (hair)	Mexico City, Mexico	Sin Piedad	January 1, 2019	
