= Akuma (luchador) =

Mexican wrestler (born 1996)

Personal information
- Born: José Luis Florencio Martínez; 1996 (age 29–30) Saltillo, Coahuila, Mexico

Professional wrestling career
- Ring name: Akuma
- Billed height: 1.77 m (5 ft 10 in)
- Billed weight: 88 kg (194 lb)
- Trained by: Arkangel de la Muerte; El Hijo del Gladiador; Franco Colombo; Tony Salazar; Virus
- Debut: May 12, 2012

José Luis Florencio Martínez (born 1996) is a Mexican professional wrestler best known under the ring name Akuma. He is working for the Mexican professional wrestling promotion Consejo Mundial de Lucha Libre (CMLL) portraying a rudo ("Bad guy") wrestling character, and is a former CMLL Arena Coliseo Tag Team Champion. He is the younger brother of CMLL wrestler Demus 3:16 and has been referred to as both Akuma 3:16 and Akuma 666 early in his career.

== Personal life ==
The wrestler known as Akuma is the younger brother of Mini-Estrella wrestler Demus 3:16. He is the brother-in-law of retired professional wrestler Hiroka Yaginuma who is married to Demus 3:16. He is also the brother in law of wrestler Charlie Montana who is married to Akuma's sister.

== Professional wrestling career ==
In Mexico, as part of the wrestling style called lucha libre, has a tradition of keeping the real name and personal information of masked wrestlers private if they have never been officially unmasked, it makes it possible that Akuma has worked under a different ring name and masked identity before May 12, 2012 where he made his in-ring debut under that name. He trained in Consejo Mundial de Lucha Libre's (CMLL) wrestling school under trainers Arkangel de la Muerte, El Hijo del Gladiador, Franco Colombo, Tony Salazar and Virus. Akuma made his debut working under the name "Akuma 3:16", referencing his brother's ring name, on Dragonmania VII, an annual event promoted by Toryumon Mexico, where he teamed up with fellow trainees Tornado, Voraz and Zuma, losing to the team of Kato Kung Lee Jr., Rock Star, Rolling Boy and Tetsuki, all trainees of either CMLL or Último Dragón (Toryumon's founder). He was later introduced as part of CMLL's Generacion 2012 in August, prior to his official CMLL debut. Generacion 2012 included Herodes Jr., Taurus, Genesis, Guerrero Negro Jr., Espanto Jr. and Oro Jr. His official CMLL debut came a few months later on September 16, 2012 on a show in Arena Mexico where he teamed up with Guerrero Negro Jr. to defeat Oro Jr. and Robin. On January 1, 2013 Akuma and Guerreo Negro Jr. teamed up to compete in the annual "Young Dragon Cup" held by Toryumon Mexico each year. The tag team was defeated in the first round by Taurus and Zumba. At the end of February 2013 CMLL held their second annual Torneo Sangre Nueva ("The New Blood Tournament"), a tournament that focuses primarily on younger wrestlers or wrestlers who work in the lower ranks of the promotion, generally the first or second match of the show, as a way to highlight or promote a wrestler up to a higher level of competition. Akuma competed in qualifying Block A, on February 26 in a 10-man Torneo cibernetico elimination match. He was the first person eliminated as he was pinned after 10 minutes of wrestling by Horus, the qualifier and tournament was won by Soberano Jr. In April 2013 Akuma was announced as one of the Novatos, or rookies, in the 2013 Torneo Gran Alternativa, or "Great Alternative tournament". The Gran Alternativa pairs a rookie with an experienced wrestler for a tag team tournament and teamed Akuma with experienced wrestler Mephisto who has a similar "demonic" ring character. The two competed in Block A on April 12, 2013 losing to Hombre Bala Jr. and Atlantis in the first round. The following year Akuma teamed up with Rey Bucanero for the 2014 Gran Alternativa tournament, only to lose in the first round to rookie Oro Jr. and veteran La Sombra.

In May 2015 Akuma competed in a qualifying match for the 2015 version of the En Busca de un Ídolo tournament in a torneo cibernetico elimination match where the last eight wrestlers would qualify for the tournament. He competed against Blue Panther Jr., Cancerbero, Canelo Casas, Delta, Disturbio, Esfinge, Flyer, El Gallo, Guerrero Maya Jr., Joker, Pegasso, Raziel, Sagrado, Stigma and Boby Zavala. Akuma was the first wrestler eliminated, pinned by Joker. In the 2017 Akuma was once again one of the rookie competitors for that year's Gran Alternativa, teaming with Comandante Pierroth. In the first round the team defeated Drone and Niebla Roja in the first round but lost to Rocy Casas and Negro Casas in the second round.

Akuma and Templario teamed up for a tournament to determine a new set of Arena Coliseo Tag Team Champions after the title had been vacated previously. The initial round of the tournament took place on February 24 and saw Akuma and Templario eliminated from the tournament by Fuego and Star Jr. In May 2018 Akuma competed in his fourth Gran Alternativa tournament, this time teaming with Euforia. The duo defeated Astral and Niebla Roja in the opening round, but ended up losing to Star Jr. and Carístico in the second round of the tournament.

In late 2018 Akuma and Camorra became involved in a storyline feud against fellow rudos Yago and El Hijo del Signo. The two sides faced off in various matches through November and December, and often involved either Akuma's or Yago's mask being torn. The feud led to a tag team Lucha de Apuestas, or "Bet match" where Akuma and Yago put their masks on the line and Camorra and El Hijo del Signo bet their hair on the outcome of the match. The match took place on January 1, 2019 as part of CMLL's annual Sin PIedad and saw Akuma and Carmorra lose the match. After the match Camorra was shaved bald while Akuma was forced to remove his mask and reveal his real name, José Luis Florencio Martínez.

On October 7, 2023, Espanto Jr. and Akuma won the CMLL Arena Coliseo Tag Team Championship, marking their first titles in CMLL.

== Championships and accomplishments ==
- Consejo Mundial de Lucha Libre

- Mexican National Heavyweight Championship (1 time, current)
- CMLL Arena Coliseo Tag Team Championship - with Espanto Jr. (1 time)
- CMLL Bodybuilding Contest (2023 - Beginner)

== Luchas de Apuestas record ==
Winner (wager)	Loser (wager)	Location	Event	Date	Notes
Yago (mask); El Hijo del Signo (hair)	Akuma (mask); Camorra (hair)	Mexico City, Mexico	Sin Piedad	January 1, 2019	
Akuma & Dark Magic (hair)	Espíritu Negro & Rey Cometa (hair)	Mexico City	CMLL Atlantis 40th Anniversary Show	July 14, 2023	
