= Torneo Gran Alternativa (2013) =

Mexican professional wrestling tournament

- Promotion: Consejo Mundial de Lucha Libre (CMLL)
- Date: April 12, 2013 – April 26, 2013
- City: Mexico City, Mexico
- Venue: Arena Mexico

Event chronology
← Previous; Arena Coliseo 70th Anniversary Show	Next → Arena México 57th Anniversary Show

Torneo Gran Alternativa chronology
← Previous; 2012	Next → 2014

The Torneo Gran Alternativa (2013) was a professional wrestling tournament event produced by Consejo Mundial de Lucha Libre (CMLL) that took place from April 12 until April 26, 2013 over the course of two CMLL Super Viernes shows, with the finals on the Arena Mexico 57th Anniversary Show. The Torneo Gran Alternativa (Spanish for "the Great Alternative tournament) concept sees a Novato or rookie team up with an experienced wrestler for a tag team tournament. The rookie winner is often elevated up the ranks of CMLL as a result of winning the tournament, but there is no specific "prize" for winning the tournament. The tournament was won by rookie Boby Zavala and veteran Rey Escorpión, Escorpión's second tournament win overall.

== History ==
Starting in 1994 the Mexican professional wrestling promotion Consejo Mundial de Lucha Libre (CMLL) created a special tournament concept where they would team up a novato, or rookie, with a veteran for a single-elimination tag team tournament. The tournament was called El Torneo Gran Alternativa, or "The Great Alternative Tournament" and became a recurring event on the CMLL calendar. CMLL did not hold a Gran Alternativa tournament in 1997 and 2000 held on each year from 2001 through 2013. The 2013 Gran Alternativa tournament was the 19th overall Gran Alternativa tournament. All tournaments have been held in Arena México.

== Tournament background ==
The tournament features 15 professional wrestling matches with different wrestlers teaming up, some of which may be involved in pre-existing scripted feuds or storylines while others are simply paired up for the tournament. Wrestlers portray either villains (referred to as Rudos in Mexico) or fan favorites (Técnicos in Mexico) as they compete in wrestling matches with pre-determined outcomes. The tournament format follows CMLL's traditional tournament formats, with two qualifying blocks of eight teams that compete on the first and second week of the tournament and a final match between the two block winners. The qualifying blocks were one-fall matches while the tournament finals will be a best two-out-of-three falls tag team match. Each qualifying block started with all 8 Novatos competing in a "seeding" battle royal to determine the brackets for the block.

2013 Gran Alternativa participants

Block	Rookie	Veteran
Block A	Taurus	Averno
Block A	Oro Jr.	Máscara Dorada
Block A	Hombre Bala Jr.	Atlantis
Block A	Stigma	La Mascara
Block A	Guerrero Negro Jr.	Último Guerrero
Block A	Disturbio	Volador Jr.
Block A	Robin	Maximo
Block A	Akuma	Mephisto
Block B	Soberano Jr.	La Sombra
Block B	Sensei	Rush
Block B	Herodes Jr.	El Terrible
Block B	Boby Zavala	Rey Escorpión
Block B	Espanto Jr.	Mr. Niebla
Block B	Camaleón	Brazo de Plata
Block B	El Cholo	Rey Bucanero
Block B	Leono	Blue Panther

Out of all the Novato participants only Hombre Bala Jr. and Boby Zavala had participated in the Gran Alternativa tournament before, having both participated in the 2012 version. Hombre Bala Jr. had teamed up with Marco Corleone, only to lose in their first match to the team of Atlantis and Tritón. Zavala had been teamed up with Rey Bucanero, but had also lost in the first round, to the team of Dragon Lee and Rush. Sensei and Camaleón are included in the Novato group even though they were not truly rookies, having been professional wrestlers for over a decade each and having used their current ring characters in CMLL since 2005 and 2007 respectively.

== Tournament results ==
First round
1	Stigma and La Mascara
16	Taurus and Averno	W
8	Akuma and Mephisto
9	Hombre Bala Jr. and Atlantis	W
5	Guerreo Negro Jr. and Último Guerrero	W
12	Oro Jr. and Mascara Dorada
4	Robin and Maximo
13	Disturbio and Volador Jr.	W
6	Soberano Jr. and La Sombra	W
11	Herodes Jr. and El Terrible
3	El Cholo and Rey Bucanero
14	Sensei and Rush	W
7	Leono and Blue Panther
10	Boby Zavala and Rey Escorpión	W
2	Espanto Jr. and Mr. Niebla	W
15	Camaleón and Brazo de Plata

Quarter-finals
Taurus and Averno
Hombre Bala Jr. and Atlantis	W
Guerreo Negro Jr. and Último Guerrero	W
Disturbio and Volador Jr.
Soberano Jr. and La Sombra	W
Rush and Sensei
Boby Zavala and Rey Escorpión	W
Espanto Jr. and Mr. Niebla

Semi-finals
Hombre Bala Jr. and Atlantis	W
Guerreo Negro Jr. and Último Guerrero
Soberano Jr. and La Sombra
Boby Zavala and Rey Escorpión	W

Final
Hombre Bala Jr. and Atlantis
Boby Zavala and Rey Escorpión	W

=== Super Viernes events ===
==== April 12, 2013 ====
No.	Results	Stipulations
1	Mercurio, Pequeño Nitro and Pequeño Olímpico defeated Acero, Aéreo, Fantasy	Best two-out-of-three falls six-man tag team match
2	Goya Kong, Luna Mágica and Silueta defeated La Comandante, La Vaquerita and Tiffany	Best two-out-of-three falls six-woman tag team match
3	Rey Cometa defeated Namajague by disqualification	Lightning match (One fall, 10 minute time-limit match)
4	Disturbio and Robin defeated Hombre Bala Jr., Guerrero Negro Jr., Stigma, Taurus, Oro Jr., Akuma	Gran Alternativa 2013 Block A "Seeding" Battle Royal
5	Taurus and Averno defeated Stigma and La Mascara	Gran Alternativa 2013 first-round match
6	Hombre Bala Jr. and Atlantis defeated Akuma and Mephisto	Gran Alternativa 2013 first-round match
7	Guerreo Negro Jr. and Último Guerrero defeated Oro Jr. and Máscara Dorada	Gran Alternativa 2013 first-round match
8	Disburbio and Volador Jr. defeated Robin and Maximo	Gran Alternativa 2013 first-round match
9	Hombre Bala Jr. and Atlantis defeated Taurus and Averno	Gran Alternativa 2013 quarter final match
10	Guerreo Negro Jr. and Último Guerrero defeated Distubio and Volador Jr.	Gran Alternativa 2013 quarter final match
11	Hombre Bala Jr. and Atlantis defeated Guerreo Negro Jr. and Último Guerrero	Gran Alternativa 2013 semi-final match
12	La Sombra, Marco Corleone and Shocker defeated Mr. Águila and Los Revolucionarios del Terror (Dragón Rojo Jr. and Rey Escorpión)	Best two-out-of-three falls six-man tag team match

==== April 19, 2013 ====
No.	Results	Stipulations
1	Pequeño Black Warrior and Pequeño Violencia defeated Electrico and Pequeño Halcón	Best two-out-of-three falls tag team match
2	El Hijo del Signo and Disturbio defeated Metálico and Molotov	Best two-out-of-three falls tag team match
3	Místico La Nueva Era and Averno defeated Valiente, Rey Cometa, Guerrero Maya Jr., Fuego, Volador Jr., Tiger, Sangre Azteca and Namajague	10-man Torneo cibernetico qualifying match for the Mexican National Welterweight Championship
4	Espanto Jr. and Camaleón defeated Sensei and Herodes Jr. and Soberano and El Cholo and Leono and Boby Zavala	Gran Alternativa 2013 Block B "Seeding" Battle Royal
5	La Sombra and Soberano Jr. defeated Herodes Jr. and El Terrible	Gran Alternativa 2013 first-round match\
6	Rush and Sensei defeated El Cholo and Rey Bucanero	Gran Alternativa 2013 first-round match
7	Rey Escorpión and Boby Zavala defeated Blue Panther and Leono	Gran Alternativa 2013 first-round match
8	Mr. Niebla and Espanto Jr. defeated Camaleón and Brazo de Plata	Gran Alternativa 2013 first-round match
9	Soberano Jr. and La Sombra defeated Rush and Sensei	Gran Alternativa 2013 quarter final match
10	Rey Escorpión and Boby Zavala defeated Mr. Niebla and Espanto Jr.	Gran Alternativa 2013 quarter final match
11	Rey Escorpión and Boby Zavala defeated La Sombra and Soberano	Gran Alternativa 2013 semi-final match
12	Atlantis, Diamante Azul and Shocker defeated Mr. Águila and Los Guerreros del Infierno (Último Guerrero and Euforia) by disqualification.	Best two-out-of-three falls six-man tag team match

==== April 26, 2013 ====
No.	Results	Stipulations
1	El Hijo del Signo and Los Guerreros Tuareg (Arkangel de la Muerte and Skándalo) defeated Metálico, Sensei and Soberano Jr. – two falls to one	Best two-out-of-three falls six-man tag team match
2	Los Hijos del Averno (Ephesto and Mephisto) and El Felino defeated Ángel de Oro, Delta and Guerrero Maya Jr. – two falls to one	Best two-out-of-three falls six-man tag team match
3	Boby Zavala and Rey Escorpión defeated Hombre Bala Jr. and Atlantis – two falls to one	Gran Alternativa 2013 semi-final match
4	Rey Cometa defeated Namajague – two falls to one	Best two-out-of-three falls Luchas de Apuestas, hair vs. hair match
5	Averno defeated Místico La Nueva Era – two falls to one	Best two-out-of-three falls match for the vacant Mexican National Welterweight Championship
6	Último Guerrero, Volador Jr. and El Terrible defeated Máscara Dorada, Rush and La Sombra by disqualification – two falls to one	Best two-out-of-three falls six-man tag team match
