= Leono =

Mexican professional wrestler

Personal information
- Born: September 18, 1982 (age 43) Guadalajara, Jalisco, Mexico

Professional wrestling career
- Ring name(s): Mustang Negro; Leono
- Billed height: 1.78 m (5 ft 10 in)
- Billed weight: 80 kg (176 lb)
- Trained by: Tony Salazar; Jose Luis Feliciano; Franco Colombo
- Debut: 2003

Leono (born September 18, 1982 in Guadalajara, Jalisco, Mexico) is a Mexican professional wrestler currently working for the Mexican promotion Consejo Mundial de Lucha Libre (CMLL) portraying a tecnico ("Good guy") wrestling character. His ring name is the Spanish translation of Lion-O from the ThunderCats cartoon.

== Professional wrestling career ==
He began his professional wrestling career working under the ring name "Mustang Negro" ("Black Mustang") but only used the name briefly from his debut in 2003 until early 2004.

=== Consejo Mundial de Lucha Libre (2004–present) ===
In 2004 he changed his ring name to Leono, the Spanish name for Lion-O of the ThunderCats, which was also reflected in the fact that Leono often had the ThunderCats logo on his trunks. Consejo Mundial de Lucha Libre (CMLL) created the Guapos University ("Hansome University"), or Guapos U, a storyline mimicking realities shows such as the WWE Tough Enough show, searching for a new member to join Shocker, Máscara Mágica and El Terrible as part of Los Guapos. The contestants included, among others, Leono, who became a regular worker for CMLL at this point. The group participated in a series of matches as they tried to determine a winner, including a tournament of Guapos U only contestants vying for a match for the Mexican National Trios Championship. The tournament was won by Misterioso, Jr., Brazo de Oro, Jr. and El Texano, Jr. although they were unable to win the title. During one of CMLL's shows El Terrible turned on the group and was joined by Último Guerrero in the attack on Los Guapos.Sangre Azteca and El Koreano prevented the rest of the Guapos U class in making the save, leading to the two them being kicked out of the group. Guerrero immediately took both Sangre Azteca and Koreano under his wing, forming Pandilla Guerrera ("Gang of Warriors"), a mid-card group associated with Último Guerrero's Los Guerreros del Infierno group. The tournament ended with Alan Stone winning the tournament. He was one of 14 men competing in the 2005 Mexican G1 Junior Climax tournament, but lost to eventual tournament winner El Texano, Jr. in the preliminary torneo cibernetico, multi-man elimination match. Leono was one of eight competitors to take part in the first ever Reyes del Aire ("Kings of the Air") tournament that took place on June 10, 2005. The tournament primarily featured younger, lower ranked wrestlers which besides Leono included Alan Stone, Ricky Marvin, Misterioso, Jr., Stuka, Jr., Tigre Blanco, Tigre Metálico, Virus and Volador Jr. Leono was the first man eliminated from the tournament. He also competed in the subsequent Reyes del Aire tournament, faring better this time as he eliminated Valiente, but did not win as he himself was eliminated by Stuka, Jr. as the fourth overall elimination. 2007 marked the third consecutive Reyes del Aire tournament appearance and his best performance to date as he eliminated Stuka, Jr. and survived longer than his previous appearances, begin the sixth person overall to be eliminated.

On March 30, 2007 Leono made his first appearance on one of CMLL's major annual shows, teaming with El Sagrado and Volador Jr. for the 2007 Homenaje a Dos Leyendas ("Homage to Two Legends") show. The trio lost to Black Warrior, Misterioso, Jr. and Tarzan Boy two falls to one. He also competed in the 2007 Leyenda de Plata ("Legend of the Silver") tournament, at the time CMLL's most prestigious annual tournament. He was the first person eliminated from the torneo cibernetico round of the tournament. 2007 was one of Leono's most active and successful, including several Luchas de Apuestas, or "bet match" wins against opponents such as Mogur, Toro Bill, Loco Max and Mr. Mexico, each time forcing them to have their hair shaved off per the Luchas de Apuestas stipulation and lucha libre traditions. In June 2008 Leono teamed up with Tony Rivera up to compete in a tournament for the CMLL Arena Coliseo Tag Team Championship. In the first round the team lost to Pandilla Guerrera ("Gang of Warriors"; Hooligan and Arkangel de la Muerte) to be eliminated from the tournament. In late 2009 CMLL vacated the Mexican National Trios Championship when Black Warrior, who was 1/3 of the championship team left CMLL. As a result, they held an eight-team elimination tournament to crown new champions. Leono teamed up with Delta and Valiente for the tournament. In their first match as a trio the team defeated Diamante, Pegasso and Rey Cometa, but lost to Poder Mexica (Sangre Azteca, Dragón Rojo, Jr. and Misterioso, Jr.) in the second round. Leono also formed a temporary tag team with Fabian El Gitano, competing in a tournament for a match against the CMLL Arena Coliseo Tag Team Champions Stuka, Jr. and Fuego. The duo defeated the brother team of Tiger Kid and Puma King in the first round, but lost to the Los Cancerberos del Infierno team of Cancerbero and Raziel in the semi-finals of the tournament. During the opening match of the September 28, 2012 Super Viernes Leono teamed up with Metalico to face the team of Zayco and Taurus. This was one of Metalico's first matches back after being unable to compete for a couple of months due to a broken leg. In the final fall Metalico landed awkwardly from a leaping move off the top rope and ended up hurting his leg. Leono had to wrestle the rest of the match by himself as Metalico was taken to the hospital on a stretcher. Despite the two on one disadvantage Leono captured the third fall and the victory for his team. On January 1, 2013, Leono and Tigre Blanco lost their hair to Bobby Zavala and Disturbio in a tag team Lucha de Apuestas. In April, 2013 Leono was announced as one of the Novatos, or rookies, in the 2013 Torneo Gran Alternativa, or "Great Alternative tournament". The Gran Alternativa pairs a rookie with an experienced wrestler for a tag team tournament. In the case of Leono the Novato aspects were ignored in favor of low position on the roster. Leono was teamed up with veteran wrestler Blue Panther competed in Block B that took place on the April 19, 2013 Super Viernes show. The team lost in the first round to Bobby Zavala and Rey Escorpión and was eliminated from the tournament.

== Luchas de Apuestas record ==
Winner (wager)	Loser (wager)	Location	Event	Date	Notes
Leono (hair)	Mr. Power (hair)	Guadalajara, Jalisco	Live event	December 3, 2006	
Leono (hair)	Mogur (hair)	Mexico City	Live event	March 18, 2007	
Leono (hair)	Toro Bill (hair)	Puebla, Puebla	Live event	May 7, 2007	
Leono (hair)	Loco Max (hair)	Puebla, Puebla	Live event	June 4, 2007	
Leono (hair)	Mr. Mexico (hair)	Mexico City	Live event	December 4, 2007	
Leono (hair)	Disturbio (hair)	Neza, Mexico State	Live event	January 31, 2008	
Bobby Zavala and Disturbio (hair)	Leono and Tigre Blanco (hair)	Mexico City	CMLL show	January 1, 2013	
Espíritu Maligno (mask)	Leono (hair)	Puebla, Puebla	CMLL show	July 15, 2013	(Note: Ten-man steel cage Masks vs. Hairs match, which also included Disturbio, Inquisidor, Pegasso, Robin, Siki Ozama, Jr., Skándalo, Stigma and Tigre Rojo, Jr.)
