= Manuel Robles =

Manuel Robles may refer to:

- Manuel Robles Pezuela (1817–1862), President of Mexico
- Manuel Robles (table tennis) (born 1959), table tennis player from Spain
- Juan Manuel Mar Hernández (1933-2014), Puebla-based Mexican luchador, wrestling promoter, & patriarch of the The Mar Family
