= Camaleón =

Mexican professional wrestler

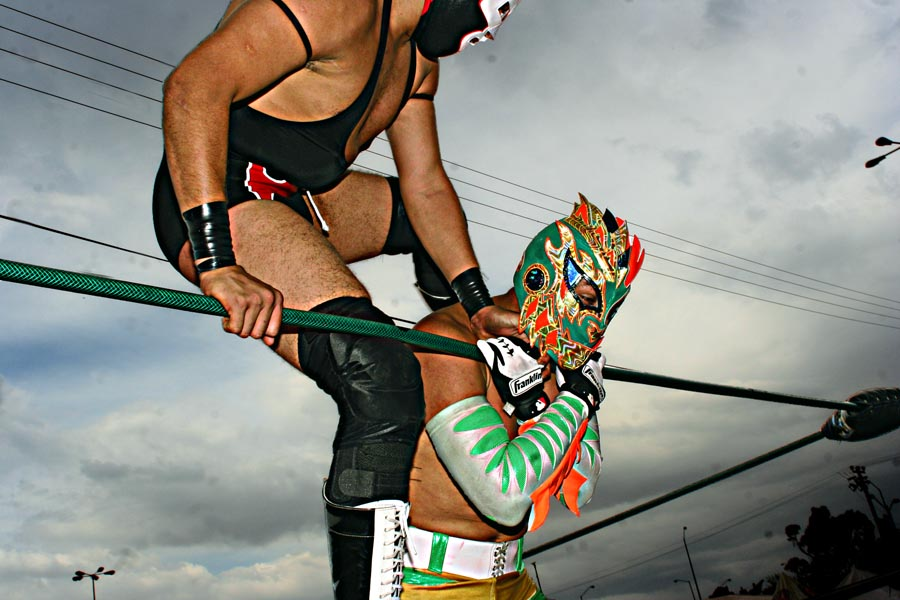

Personal information
- Born: Unrevealed; 1979 (age 46–47)

Professional wrestling career
- Ring name(s): Camaleón; Súper Camaleón
- Trained by: Arkangel de la Muerte
- Debut: 1999

Camaleón (born 1979) is a Mexican professional wrestler currently working for the Mexican promotion Consejo Mundial de Lucha Libre (CMLL) portraying a tecnico ("Good guy") wrestling character. Camaleón's real name is not a matter of public record, as is often the case with masked wrestlers in Mexico where their private lives are kept a secret from the wrestling fans.

== Professional wrestling career ==
The wrestler known under the ring name Camaleón has on a few occasions stated that he began his wrestling career in 1999, but never revealed what ring name he worked under from 1999 until 2007 when he began working for Consejo Mundial de Lucha Libre (CMLL) as Súper Camaleón ("Super Chameleon). The secrecy about former masked identities is not uncommon in Mexico where the private lives of the masked wrestlers is kept secret. Early in his CMLL career he would often form a tag team with a wrestler known as Super Tri and worked in the low ranked matches. His contract with CMLL allowed him to work for a number of other promoters' including Último Dragón's Toryumon promotion since they had a close working relationship with CMLL. On December 14, 2008 he competed in the annual Young Dragons Cup in a torneo cibernetico, multi-man elimination match that also included Adam Bridle, Miedo, Ministro, Disturbio, Trauma I and Trauma II and was won by Satoshi Kajiwara. Later on he would team with Ministro to face Los Traumas (Trauma I and Trauma II) on subsequent Toryumon shows in Mexico City.

=== Camaleón (2010–present) ===
His ring name was shortened to simply Camaleón in 2010, although he would still, on occasion, be promoted as Súper Camaleón on local, minor shows in Mexico City. Camaleón was one of 16 students of Arkangel de la Muerte selected to participate in a Battle Royal, the Torneo Arkangel, to honor the 25th anniversary of Arkangel de La Muerte. The match as won by Starman and also included Bobby Zavala, Canelo Casas, Cocolores, Flamita, Fresbee, Halcon Magico, Kato, Principe Azteca, Robin, Trox, Trueno, Ultimo Samurai, Warrior Steel and Yago. In subsequent years Camaleón continued to work in the lower ranks and kept training in CMLL's wrestling school. On March 3, 2012 Camaleón was one of 16 low ranking wrestlers who participated in the first ever Torneo Sangre Nueva ("New Blood Tournament"), a tournament designed specifically to promote one or more of the younger wrestlers up the ranks of CMLL. Camaleón competed in the "Block A" torneo cibernetico, eliminating Cholo as the first person from the match, but was later eliminated by eventual tournament winner Dragon Lee after 17 minutes of wrestling. A year later Camaleón was one of 20 competitors in the 2013 Torneo Sangre Nueva, marking the second time he competed in the tournament. In a repeat of the 2012 tournament he eliminated Cholo from the tournament, but was himself eliminated by Herodes Jr. In late March, 2013 Camaleón was announced as one of the Novatos, or rookies, in the 2013 Torneo Gran Alternativa, or "Great Alternative tournament". The Gran Alternativa pairs a rookie with an experienced wrestler for a tag team tournament. Camaleón was teamed up with veteran wrestler Brazo de Plata and competed in Block B that took place on the April 19, 2013 Super Viernes show. The team lost in the first round to Espanto Jr. and Mr. Niebla and was eliminated from the tournament.

== Championships and accomplishments ==
- Mexican Independent Circuit
  - BJC Tag Team Championship (1 time) – with Cancerbero
