= Starman (wrestler) =

Mexican professional wrestler (1974–2022)

Personal information
- Born: 16 November 1974 Mexico
- Died: 23 September 2022 (aged 47)

Professional wrestling career
- Ring name(s): Starman; Ultraman, Jr.
- Billed height: 1.75 m (5 ft 9 in)
- Billed weight: 88 kg (194 lb)
- Trained by: Roy Lancer; Hijo del Gladiador; Ultramán; Franco Colombo
- Debut: 30 April 1994

Othoniel Trejo (16 November 1974 – 23 September 2022), better known under his ring name Starman, was a Mexican professional wrestler best known for his time in Consejo Mundial de Lucha Libre (CMLL). He previously worked as Ultraman Jr. and also wrestled in Japan, most notably for New Japan Pro-Wrestling (NJPW). Prior to his death, Starman's real name was not a matter of public record, as is often the case with masked wrestlers in Mexico, where their private lives are kept a secret from the wrestling fans.

== Professional wrestling career ==
At the beginning of his career, he made his debut on 30 April 1994 in Naucalpan as Ultramán Jr. During his time in Naucalpan, he won the mask of Tortuguillo Karateka IV, one of the Ninja Turtles. By 1995, he had his first Japanese tour in July, wrestling in Pro Wrestling Fujiwara Gumi. In November 1995, he teamed for the first time with Solar and Super Astro to reform the Cadetes del Espacio. During the early 80s, the original Cadetes (Solar, Super Astro, and the original Ultramán) were a popular high flying team.

=== Consejo Mundial de Lucha Libre ===
On 23 January 1996, Starman made his debut for Consejo Mundial de Lucha Libre (CMLL), teaming with Alacran de Durango and Olimpus defeating Fiero, America, and Linx. Later on, he was in a tournament of Block B for the CMLL World Welterweight Championship. In the first round, he lost to Karloff Lagarde, Jr. In October 1998 he changed his name to Starman to avoid legal trouble with the original Ultramán (not a relative). Ever since his debut the original had been feuding with him over the rights to the name. He changed his name to Starman after that. He made his first "major show" appearance when he teamed up with Astro Rey, Jr., El Oriental, Tigre Blanco, and Mr. Águila in a losing effort against Zumbido, El Satánico, Valentin Mayo, Virus, and Rencor Latino on the undercard of CMLL's 1999 Ruleta de la Muerte pay-per-view event. On 17 March 2000, he made another major show teaming with Tigre Blanco, Mascara Magica, Astro Rey, Jr., Antifaz, Tony Rivera, Safari, and Olimpico in another losing effort to Arkangel de la Muerte, Dr. O'Borman, Último Guerrero, Zumbido, Rencor Latino, Mr. Mexico, Violencia, and Rey Bucanero. On 1 January 2001, he became Ultraman Jr. again to lose his mask to Arkangel de la Muerte in a Japanese card co-promoted by Atsushi Onita, which was never acknowledged nor even mentioned in his home country.

By 2005, Starman started wrestling in Japan again, this time in New Japan Pro-Wrestling (NJPW). Since his return he had his first match losing to Japanese legend, Tiger Mask. Months later he returned to CMLL wrestling in the undercard.

Starman died in September 2022 of unknown causes.

== Luchas de Apuestas record ==
Winner (wager)	Loser (wager)	Location	Event	Date	Notes
Ultraman Jr. (mask)	Tortuguillo Karateka IV (mask)	Naucalpan, Mexico State	Live event	1 August 1995	(Note: This was a triangle match that also included Fantastik.)
Ultraman Jr. (mask)	Fiero (mask)	Mexico City	Live event	15 June 1997	
Arkangel de la Muerte (mask)	Ultraman Jr. (mask)	Tokyo, Japan	Live event	1 January 2001	(Note: Starman worked as Ultraman Jr. again for one night to lose his mask.)
Starman (mask)	Dr. Muerte (mask)	San Luis Potosí, San Luis Potosí	Live event	22 July 2001	
Starman (mask)	Hijo del Signo (mask)	Mexico City	Sin Salida	25 December 2017	(Note: 10 man steel cage match that also included Star Jr., Oro Jr., Templario, Fiero, Nitro, Raziel and Cancerbero)
