= Stigma (luchador) =

Mexican professional wrestler

Personal information
- Born: Unrevealed

Professional wrestling career
- Ring name: Stigma
- Trained by: Franco Columbo; Police Man; Toro Bill
- Debut: July 26, 2010

Stigma is a Mexican professional wrestler working for the Mexican promotion Consejo Mundial de Lucha Libre (CMLL) portraying a tecnico ("Good guy") wrestling character. Stigma's real name is not a matter of public record, as is often the case with masked wrestlers in Mexico where their private lives are kept a secret from the wrestling fans. While his real name is not public knowledge it has been confirmed that he is the cousin of CMLL wrestler Skándalo, son of former wrestler & Arena Puebla promoter El Jabato, nephew of Black Cat, and grandson of Manuel Robles, making him a third-generation wrestler.

== Personal life ==
Stigma is the son of Benjamin Mar who used to wrestle under the ring name El Jabato. His uncle Panico (Juan Manuel Mar) is part of Consejo Mundial de Lucha Libre's (CMLL) booking team and thus is one of the men that plan the matches and storylines of the promotion. He is the brother of Skándalo who works for CMLL as well but as a rudo ("Bad guy" character) while Stigma is a tecnico ("Good guy"). He is a third-generation wrestler as both his paternal and maternal grandfathers, Manuel Robles and Raul Reyes, were wrestlers as well. His great uncles include wrestlers Huroki Sito, Sugi Sito and Panchito Robles, his uncle wrestles as Zapatista while his second cousins Victor Mar Manuel (who worked as Black Cat until his death), Panchito Robles Jr., La Briosa also were or are wrestlers.

== Professional wrestling career ==
Stigma's official debut date was given as July 26, 2010, but as he is a masked wrestler it is possible that he worked as a different ring character before that date. Stigma trained at the Consejo Mundial de Lucha Libre (CMLL) wrestling school in Puebla, Puebla and worked primarily in Arena Puebla early on. Initially he made a large number of mistakes during his matches, due to nerves and inexperience, but the mistakes coupled with the fact that the Arena Puebla bookers quickly promoted him up the ranks made the fans critical of him and often booed him during his early career. Stigma stepped back, intensified his training and by 2012 he had become a more skilled, well rounded wrestler who was earning his position in CMLL through his skills. He was one of 16 young wrestlers who participated in the first ever Torneo Sangre Nueva ("Young Blood Tournament"), designed specifically to elevate some of these young wrestlers up the ranks. Stigma took part in the Block A torneo cibernetico elimination match. Stigma lost to Cancerbero in a match won by Dragon Lee. In the months following the Sangre Nueva tournament Stigma became involved in a "Puebla vs. Los Coliseinos" (wrestlers who came from Arena Coliseo in Mexico City), defending his home town of Puebla against the "Outsiders". The feud led to a 12-man torneo cibernetico' where "Team Puebla" (Stigma, Asturiano, Espiritu Maligno, Karissma, Lestat and Milenium) defeated "Team Coliseinos" (Dragon Lee, Hombre Bala Jr., Pegasso, Puma King, Skándalo and Súper Comando). The following week all 12 competitors risked either their mask or hair as they participated in a Lucha de Apuesta ("Bet match") Steel cage match. Stigma escaped the cage, keeping his mask safe while Puma King defeated Karissma to unmask him. Stigma made his Super Viernes debut on the October 5, 2012 version, teaming with Camaleón to defeat Los Hombres del Camoflaje (Artillero and Súper Comando). Working on CMLL's main show was a sign that CMLL had plans to promote Stigma on a national level instead of only locally in Puebla. Stigma participated in the 2013 Torneo Sangre Nueva, but like in 2012 did not make it past the preliminary round as he was eliminated by Bobby Zavala. In late March, 2013 Stigma was announced as one of the Novatos, or rookies, in the 2013 Torneo Gran Alternativa, or "Great Alternative tournament". The Gran Alternativa pairs a rookie with an experienced wrestler for a tag team tournament. Stigma teamed with veteran La Mascara. The two competed in Block A on April 12, 2013 losing to Taurus and Averno in the first round. Stigma defeated Espiritu Maligno for his first Mask vs Mask in July 29, 2013 in Arena Puebla. Stigma defeated Camorra for his Mask vs Mask on December 30, 2013 in Arena Puebla. In Arena Puebla, on July 16, 2014 Stigma unsuccessfully challenged Virus for the CMLL World Lightweight Championship. In January 2015, Stigma made his New Japan Pro-Wrestling (NJPW) debut, when he worked the Fantastica Mania 2015 tour, co-produced by CMLL and NJPW. In May, 2015 CMLL Stigma competed in a qualifying match for the 2015 version of En Busca de un Ídolo as one of 16 wrestlers in the qualifying torneo cibernetico, elimination match where the last eight wrestlers would qualify for the tournament. He competed against Akuma, Blue Panther Jr., Cancerbero, Canelo Casas, Delta, Disturbio, Esfinge, Flyer, El Gallo, Guerrero Maya Jr., Joker, Pegasso, Raziel, Sagrado and Boby Zavala. Stigma pinned Pegasso during the match but ended up being the seventh wrestler eliminated, pinned by Esfinge.

== Championships and accomplishments ==
- Consejo Mundial de Lucha Libre
  - CMLL World Lightweight Championship (1 time, current)

== Luchas de Apuestas record ==
Winner (wager)	Loser (wager)	Location	Event	Date	Notes
Stigma (mask)	Espiritu Maligno (mask)	Puebla, Puebla	CMLL show	July 29, 2013	
Stigma (mask)	Camorra (mask)	Puebla, Puebla	CMLL show	December 30, 2013	
Stigma (mask)	Policeman (hair)	Puebla, Puebla	CMLL show	December 28, 2015	(Note: Last two men in a steel cage match that also included Canelo Casas, Disturbio, Espiritu Maligno, Fuego, King Jaguar, Okumura, Rey Cometa and Skándalo.)
