= Boby Zavala =

Mexican professional wrestler

Personal information
- Born: February 12, 1991 (age 35) Torreón, Coahuila, Mexico

Professional wrestling career
- Ring name(s): Bobby Villa; Bobby Z Bobby Zavala; Boby Zavala; Licantropo
- Billed height: 1.77 m (5 ft 9 1/2 in)
- Billed weight: 90 kg (198 lb)
- Trained by: Corsario Rojo; Viento Negro; Emperador Azteca; Arkángel de la Muerte; Franco Colombo
- Debut: 2008

Boby Zavala (born February 12, 1991) is a Mexican professional wrestler. He is best known for working for the Mexican promotion Consejo Mundial de Lucha Libre (CMLL) between 2011 and 2017, where he portrayed a rudo ("bad guy") wrestling character. He originally worked as a masked wrestler called Licantropo, but adopted his current ring name in 2010 and unmasked.

== Professional wrestling career ==
=== Consejo Mundial de Lucha Libre (2010-2017) ===
Boby Zavala began his wrestling career in 2008 after being trained by Corsario Rojo, Viento Negro and Emperador Azteca. He adopted a ring character called Licantropo, Spanish for Lycanthrope or werewolf, with a wrestling mask and outfit patterned on werewolf imagery. In 2010 he abandoned the ring character, unmasked and began wrestling under the name Boby Zavala. As Zavala he began working for Consejo Mundial de Lucha Libre (CMLL) and trained under Arkángel de la Muerte and Franco Colombo. Zavala was introduced to the general CMLL audience as part of Generación 2011 group. the group was not a unit as such, more a "graduating class", who made their debut around the same time. The group also included Magnus, Enrique Vera, Jr., Hombre Bala Jr., Dragon Lee, Hijo del Signo, and Super Halcón Jr. He was one of 16 students of Arkangel de la Muerte selected to participate in a Battle Royal, the Torneo Arkangel, to honor the 25th anniversary of Arkangel de La Muerte. The match as won by Starman. Zavala was involved in a general Generacion 2011 vs. veteran rudos storyline, which ultimately resulted in a Luchas de Apuestas, or bet match where Hombre Bala Jr. and Super Halcón Jr. unmasked Los Rayos Tapatío. In late 2011 Zavala began an individual storyline feud against Evola that took place primarily in CMLL's training league in Guadalajara, Jalisco. The feud culminated in a Luchas de Apuestas, or bet match, where both wrestlers put their hair on the line. The match took place on November 25, 2011, and saw Zavala pin his experienced opponent, forcing Evola to be shaved bald after the match. Following his Apuesta victory he became a regular competitor in Arena Mexico, Mexico's main venue and made his Super Viernes debut on February 3, 2012, teaming with Disturbio as the team lost to Metálico and Molotov. On March 6, 2012, Zavala competed in the first Torneo Sangre Nueva ("New Blood Tournament"), a tournament designed to highlight younger, low ranking wrestlers. Zavala took part in the first of two torneo cibernetico, multi-man elimination matches but was pinned by Cancerbero and eliminated from the tournament. Only weeks later Zavana was teamed up with veteran wrestler Rey Bucanero to compete in the 2012 Torneo Gran Alternativa ("Great Alternative tournament"). The Gran Alternativa tournament pairs a rookie with an experienced wrestler for a tag team tournament. Zavala and Dragon Lee were the last two survivors in the "Seeding" battle royal, while Dragon Lee and Rush defeated Zavala and Ray Bucanero in the first round of the tournament.

In the months following the Gran Alternativa tournament Zavala began working with fellow rookie rudo (heel) Disturbio. In late 2012 the duo of Zavala and Distubio began a storyline against the tecnico ("good guy character") team of Leono and Tigre Blanco. The two teams clashed on multiple occasions, building the rivalry until the two teams faced off in a double Luchas de Apuestas match where both teams put their hair on the line in the match. The match took place on January 1, 2013, and saw Leono and Tigre Blanco lose and for the first time in their careers shaved bald as a result of the loss. Zavala was one of a handful of wrestlers that returned to the 2013 version of the Torno Sangre Nueva tournament, but like in 2012 did not make it past the first round as he was pinned by Hombre Bala Jr. as the 8th elimination in the match. In late March 2013, Zavala was announced as one of the Novatos in the 2013 Torneo Gran Alternativa, marking the second time he had competed in the tournament as a rookie. Zavala was teamed up with veteran wrestler Rey Escorpión and competed in Block B that took place on the April 19, 2013, Super Viernes show. The team defeated Leono and Blue Panther in the first round, Espanto, Jr. and Mr. Niebla in the second round, and defeated Soberano Jr. and La Sombra in the semi-finals to earn the last spot in the finals of the tournament the following week at the Arena Mexico 57th Anniversary Show. For the finals Zavala was made an honorary member of Los Revolucionarios completed with a Rey Escorpión and his own Sombrero. The team unity worked as the two defeated Hombre Bala Jr. and Atlantis to win the tournament. In May 2015 Zavala competed in a qualifying match for the 2015 version of En Busca de un Ídolo as one of 16 wrestlers in the qualifying torneo cibernetico, elimination match where the last eight wrestlers would qualify for the tournament. He competed against Akuma, Blue Panther Jr., Cancerbero, Canelo Casas, Delta, Disturbio, Esfinge, Flyer, El Gallo, Guerrero Maya Jr., Joker, Pegasso, Raziel, Sagrado and Stigma. During the match Zavala eliminated Sagrado and was one of the eight survivors of the match to qualify.

On October 16, Zavala was renamed "Bobby Z". In January 2016, Bobby Z made his Japanese debut by taking part in the CMLL and New Japan Pro-Wrestling (NJPW) co-produced Fantastica Mania 2016 tour. In 2017, Zavala was again renamed, this time "Bobby Villa", after Pancho Villa. On May 22, 2017, CMLL announced that Zavala had been fired from the promotion. No official reason was given but the announcement was made at the same time as the firing of Máximo Sexy and La Máscara who were involved in vandalizing Último Guerrero's car. Zavala's role in the incident was not clear.

== Championships and accomplishments ==
- Consejo Mundial de Lucha Libre
  - Occidente Tag Team Championship (1 time) – with Olímpico
  - Gran Alternativa (2013) – with Rey Escorpión
  - En Busca de un Ídolo 2015
- FULL Lucha Libre
  - FULL World Championship (2 times)

== Luchas de Apuestas record ==
Winner (wager)	Loser (wager)	Location	Event	Date	Notes
Boby Zavala (hair)	Evola (hair)	Guadalajara, Jalisco	CMLL show	November 25, 2011	
Boby Zavala and Disturbio (hair)	Leono and Tigre Blanco (hair)	Mexico City	CMLL show	January 1, 2013	
