= El Cholo (wrestler) =

Mexican professional wrestler

Personal information
- Born: Carlos Soriano Mendoza; 1973 (age 52–53) Mexico City, Mexico

Professional wrestling career
- Ring name: El Cholo
- Trained by: Versatil; Tony Salazar; Virus; Arkangel de la Muerte
- Debut: 1994

Carlos Soriano Mendoza (born 1973), better known by his ring name El Cholo (Spanish for "the Half-breed"), is a Mexican professional wrestler who works for promotion Consejo Mundial de Lucha Libre (CMLL).

== Professional wrestling career ==
Carlos Soriano Mendoza made his professional wrestling debut in 1993 or 1994 at the age of 20. Since he worked as an masked wrestler, he has not revealed what ring name he used prior to adopting the name and mask of El Cholo in 2008. In Mexico, the real identity of masked wrestlers is kept secret and often not even alluded to the fact that they used to compete under a different name. The debut of El Cholo is listed as 1993 or 1994, but with no confirmation of what name he wrestled under, not even confirming if he wrestled as a masked wrestler before 2008 or not.

=== El Cholo (2008–present) ===
He adopted the El Cholo name in 2008, working for Consejo Mundial de Lucha Libre (CMLL) as a low ranking rudo ("bad guy"), mainly wrestling in the first or second match of the night and at times with months between appearances. It is unclear if those breaks between matches was due to El Cholo having a day job, suffered from injuries or simply wrestled under a different identity as well from time to time. Over the years, El Cholo remained a low ranking, but experienced rudo, who helped work with younger wrestlers as part of their training and development as wrestlers. On July 18, 2010, he wrestled on his first major CMLL event as he teamed up with Inquisidor for the 2010 Infierno en el Ring show, losing the opening match to the team of Tigre Blanco and Metatron, two falls to one. In March 2012, El Cholo was one of the participants in the first ever Torneo Sangre Nueva ("The New Blood Tournament"), a tournament that featured 16 wrestlers classified as rookies, or low ranking wrestlers. El Cholo competed in the Block A torneo cibernetico, eight-man elimination match on March 6 and was the first man eliminated in the match as Camaleón pinned him after 8 minutes and 11 seconds. The following year he was once again part of the Torneo Sangre Nueva tournament. For the second year in a row El Cholo was pinned by Camaleón, albeit not as the first one eliminated from the torneo cibernetico match. In April 2013, El Cholo was announced as one of the Novatos (or rookies), in the 2013 Torneo Gran Alternativa ("Great Alternative tournament"). The Gran Alternativa pairs a rookie with an experienced wrestler for a tag team tournament. He was teamed up with veteran wrestler Rey Bucanero to compete in Block B of the tournament that took place on the April 19, 2013 Super Viernes show. The team lost in the first round to Sensei and Rush and was eliminated from the tournament. In late 2014, Cholo and Ramstein began a storyline feud with the team of rookie wrestlers Star Jr. and Soberano Jr., also known as Los Principes del Ring ("The Princes of the Ring"), with the main theme being that the veterans felt that Star Jr. and Soberano Jr. were disrespectful to the more experienced Cholo and Ramstein and wanted to teach the "brats" their proper place in CMLL. On December 30, 2014, the four men signed a contract to risk their masks in a Luchas de Apuestas (or "bet match"). In the professional wrestling style called lucha libre, winning an opponent's mask is considered the "ultimate prize". On January 6, 2015, Star Jr. and Soberano Jr. defeated Cholo and Ramstein in a best two-out-of-three falls match, forcing both of their opponents to unmask in front of the Arena México crowd, while revealing their real names. After the match, Cholo unmasked and revealed that his name was Carlos Soriano Mendoza and that he had been a wrestler for 20 years at the time.

== Championships and accomplishments ==
- Comisión de Box y Lucha Libre Mexico D.F.
  - Mexican National Trios Championship (1 time) – with Apocalipsis and Disturbio

== Luchas de Apuestas record ==
Winner (wager)	Loser (wager)	Location	Event	Date	Notes
Los Principes del Ring (masks) (Star Jr. and Soberano Jr.)	El Cholo and Ramstein (masks)	Mexico City	CMLL Martes de Arena Mexico	January 6, 2015	
Canelo Casas (hair)	El Cholo (hair)	Mexico City	CMLL Domingo Arena Mexico	July 30, 2017	
