= Delta (wrestler) =

Mexican professional wrestler

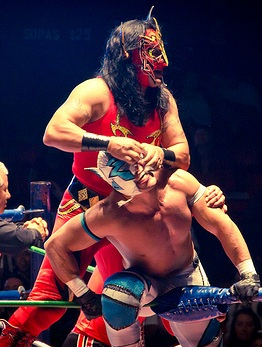
- Delta (in front) having his mask pulled by Psicosis

Personal information
- Born: August 27, 1985 (age 41) Monterrey, Nuevo León

Professional wrestling career
- Ring name(s): Blue Angel Jr. Hijo del Trueno; Delta
- Billed height: 1.77 m (5 ft 9 1/2 in)
- Billed weight: 80 kg (176 lb)
- Trained by: Trueno (Sr.); Franco Colombo
- Debut: 2003

Delta (born August 27, 1985) is a Mexican professional wrestler best known for his work with Consejo Mundial de Lucha Libre (CMLL). Delta's real name is not a matter of public record, as is often the case with masked wrestlers in Mexico where their private lives are kept a secret from the wrestling fans. Delta is the son of wrestler Trueno and previously wrestled as Hijo del Trueno ("Son of Thunder"), his brother currently works for CMLL wrestling under the ring name Trueno like their father, although the family relationship has not been publicly acknowledged by CMLL.

== Personal life ==
The wrestler currently known as Delta was born in Monterrey on August 27, 1985, and grew up watching his father wrestle under a mask as "Trueno" (Spanish for "Thunder"). Trueno wore an outfit closely resembling the red and yellow outfit of the comic book character The Flash and worked for Consejo Mundial de Lucha Libre (CMLL) in the 1970s. The future Delta attended the Regiomontana University, where he earned a degree in business administration in tourism. He later stated that while he was not required to get a college degree to become a professional wrestler, he knew he needed something to fall back on. From an early age, the future Delta played football, starting as a child at AFAIM; he also played for the Autonomous University of Nuevo León, Authentic Tigers and the Regiomontana University Jaguars. He also has a daughter.

== Professional wrestling career ==
The future Delta trained for a professional wrestling career for over four years under his father while attending college. He made his debut in 2003 under the name "Blue Angel Jr.", not revealing his family relationship. In May 2007, he debuted under the name "Hijo del Trueno", sporting a thunderbolt mask and trunks akin to his father's and primarily competing on the Monterrey independent circuit.

=== Delta (2009–present) ===
In 2009, he achieved one of his childhood dreams as he began working for CMLL, receiving further training from Franco Colombo and a new ring name, mask and outfit, becoming "Delta". He made his in-ring debut on August 11, teaming with Sensei to defeat Los Romanos (Caligula and Messala). On December 29, Delta, Leono and Valiente participated in an eight-team elimination tournament to crown new Mexican National Trios Champions; they defeated Diamante, Pegasso and Rey Cometa in the first round, but lost to Poder Mexica (Dragón Rojo Jr., Misterioso II and Sangre Azteca) in the second round. On April 23, 2010, Delta was paired with Volador Jr. in "Block B" of the Torneo Gran Alternativa ("Great Alternative Tournament"), a tag team tournament pairing a rookie with a veteran; they were considered the favorites to win the block. They defeated El Felino and Tiger Kid in the first round and Averno and Raziel in the second round. In the Block B final, Volador Jr. was eliminated first, leading Delta to eliminate both Puma King and Último Guerrero, securing their spot in the tournament finals, which they lost to Héctor Garza and Pólvora on April 30. On December 20, Delta won an online poll to become one-third of the Mexican National Trios Champions alongside Metro and Stuka Jr. On January 9, 2011, they lost the title to Ángel de Oro, Diamante and Rush.

In June, Delta, Atlantis and Guerrero Maya Jr. won the Forjando un Ídolo tournament. On November 16, Atlantis announced that he was officially forming a stable named Los Reyes de la Atlantida ("The Kings of the Atlantis") with the two. At Sin Piedad on December 16, the trio defeated Los Invasores (Olímpico, Psicosis II and Volador Jr.) for the Mexican National Trios Championship, but lost it to Los Depredadores del Aire (Black Warrior, Mr. Águila and Volador Jr.) on June 22. They regained the title on October 30, but lost it to Los Invasores' Kraneo, Mr. Águila and Psicosis II on December 16. On March 8, 2013, Delta was forced to team with Tiger in the Torneo Nacional de Parejas Increibles ("National Incredible Pairs Tournament"), which forces rivals to team with each other. However, they had no rivalry and wore matching colored outfits as a sign of team unity, but lost to Blue Panther and Rey Escorpión in the first round. On November 3, Delta and Guerrero Maya Jr. defeated La Fiebre Amarilla (Namajague and Okumura) to win the CMLL Arena Coliseo Tag Team Championship. Over 400 days later, they lost it to La Comando Caribeño (Misterioso Jr. and Sagrado) on February 28, 2015. On April 26, Los Reyes de la Atlantida won their record-breaking third Mexican National Trios Championship from La Peste Negra (El Felino, Mr. Niebla and Negro Casas).

In May, Delta was given the opportunity to compete in that year's En Busca de un Ídolo as one of sixteen wrestlers in the qualifying torneo cibernetico elimination match, where the last eight wrestlers would qualify for the tournament. Delta eliminated Cancerbero and was among the eight wrestlers to survive the match. During the tournament, the wrestlers competed in a round-robin first round, earning points based on match outcomes. After each match, a four-man judging panel critiqued and rated them on the match they just saw; all wrestlers would be given additional points from a weekly online poll open to fans. During the first round, Delta defeated Boby Zavala, Esfinge and Flyer, but lost to Canelo Casas, Disturbio and stablemate Guerrero Maya Jr. For the final match, Delta was supposed to wrestle Blue Panther Jr. at Sin Salida on July 17, but due to his absence, Delta defeated Hechicero instead. Delta faced significant criticism from the judges during the tournament, with his early performance issues being linked to a knee injury. His scores ranged from 20 (out of 40) to 27, totaling 132 points, the lowest of all eight wrestlers. Ultimately, Delta was eliminated before the final week's poll results, as he was over 40 points behind fourth place, making advancement up the rankings impossible. On August 9, Los Reyes de la Atlantida lost the Mexican National Trios Championship to Los Hijos del Infierno (Ephesto, Mephisto and Lucifierno), ending their third reign as champions.

== Championships and accomplishments ==
- Consejo Mundial de Lucha Libre
  - CMLL Arena Coliseo Tag Team Championship (1 time) – with Guerrero Maya Jr.
  - Mexican National Trios Championship (4 times) – with Metro and Stuka Jr. (1) and Atlantis and Guerrero Maya Jr. (3)
  - Arena Coliseo Tag Team Championship #1 Contendership Tournament (2010) – with Diamante
  - Forjando un Ídolo: La Guerra Continúa (2011) – with Atlantis and Guerrero Maya Jr.
  - CMLL Rookie of the Year (2010)

== Luchas de Apuestas record ==
Winner (wager)	Loser (wager)	Location	Event	Date	Notes
Delta (mask)	Galactar (mask)	Monterrey, Mexico	Live event	November 26, 2016	
