= Sensei (wrestler) =

Mexican professional wrestler

Personal information
- Born: September 16, 1978 (age 47) Cuernavaca, Morelos, Mexico

Professional wrestling career
- Ring name(s): Kundalini; Fantasy; Sensei
- Billed height: 1.72 m (5 ft 7 1/2 in)
- Billed weight: 84 kg (185 lb)
- Trained by: Villano I Sordo Flores; Satánico
- Debut: June 1995

Sensei (born September 16, 1978) is a Mexican professional wrestler, best known for working for Consejo Mundial de Lucha Libre (CMLL). He previously worked for International Wrestling Revolution Group (IWRG) as Fantasy where he won several titles. Sensei's real name is not a matter of public record, as is often the case with masked wrestlers in Mexico where their private lives are kept a secret from the professional wrestling fans.

== Professional wrestling career ==
Initially the wrestler who would later work as Sensei used the ring name Kundalini when he made his debut in 1995. He was one of the first wrestlers to work for International Wrestling Revolution Group (IWRG) when it formed in 1996. In IWRG he was given the name Fantasy along with a colorful outfit and mask. In 1999 Fantasy went to Toryumon Mexico to participate in the Young Dragons Cup, but in the first round he lost to Yasushi Kanda. The year 2000 became his break-out year as he teamed with Black Dragon to reach the finals of a tournament to crown the first ever IWRG Intercontinental Tag Team Champions but lost to Yasushi Kanda and Susumu Mochizuki on January 2, 2000. Two months later Fantasy teamed with Starboy to defeat Kanda and Mochizuki to win the tag team championship. Fantasy and Star Boy lost the tag team titles to Los Megas (Mega and Ultra Mega) in October, 2000 but regained them a year later. The team lost the titles to Los Megas once again and then split up in 2002. Fantasy quickly found singles success as he defeated Cerebro Negro for the IWRG Intercontinental Welterweight Championship on October 27, 2002. On November 3, 2002, Fantasy lost a Luchas de Apuesta to El Hijo del Diablo and was forced to unmask per lucha libre (the professional wrestling style originary from Mexico) tradition. Fantasy held the Welterweight title for 301 days before losing it back to Cerebro Negro on August 24, 2003. In 2004 Fantasy competed in and won IWRG's annual Rey del Ring (a multi-man battle royal similar to the Royal Rumble); with the win he also won the IWRG Intercontinental Middleweight Championship that had been vacant up until that time. Fantasy held the title for 70 days before losing it to Cerebro Negro.

=== Sensei (2005–2018) ===
In 2005 Fantasy left IWRG and joined Consejo Mundial de Lucha Libre (CMLL), changed his gimmick to Sensei and made his debut on June 15, 2005. In 2008 Sensei teamed with Neutron to participate in the CMLL Arena Coliseo Tag Team Title Tournament. In the first round they lost to Nitro and Skandalo. Sensei still work for CMLL, but has not found the success he had in IWRG as he still wrestles in the low card matches, unlike IWRG where he worked the mid-card matches. Ángel de Plata was one of 12 men who put their masks on the line as part of a 12-man steel cage match in the main event of the 2010 Infierno en el Ring.He was the fourth man overall to escape from the cage, keeping his mask safe. In the end Ángel de Oro defeated Fabián el Gitano in the Lucha de Apueta (bet match) portion of the match to unmask him. On November 28, 2012, Sensei won both the Intermediate category and the overall category in CMLL's annual Bodybuilding contest. In March 2013 Sensei was one of 18 wrestlers who competed in the annual Torneo Sangre Nueva ("New Blood Tournament"), a tournament for primarily for young wrestlers but also included the 18-year veteran Sensei. He competed in qualifying block B on March 5, 2013, for a place in the finals, the other wrestlers in Block B included Genesis, Robin, Oro, Jr., Super Halcón Jr., Disturbio, Guerrero Negro, Jr., Inquisidor, Taurus and Zayco who competed in a torneo cibernetico, multi-man elimination match. Sensei eliminated Inquisidor but was eliminated himself by finalist Taurus. In late March, 2013 Sensei was announced as one of the Novatos, or rookies, in the 2013 Torneo Gran Alternativa, or "Great Alternative tournament". The Gran Alternativa pairs a rookie with an experienced wrestler for a tag team tournament. In Sensei's case the "rookie" aspect of the tournament was ignore as he was part of the Novato group Sensei was teamed up with Rush, who was actually less experienced than Sensei. The team competed in Block B that took place on the April 19, 2013 Super Viernes show. The team defeated El Cholo and Rey Bucanero in the first round, but lost to Soberano Jr. and La Sombra in the second round to be eliminated from the tournament.

Disappeared from CMLL cards after May 2018, and reappeared back in IWRG in 2022.

== Championships and accomplishments ==
- Consejo Mundial de Lucha Libre

- CMLL Bodybuilding Contest: 2012 – Intermediate, Overall

- Comisión de Box y Lucha Libre Mexico Distrito Federal

- Distrito Federal Welterweight Championship (1 time, current)

- International Wrestling Revolution Group

- IWRG Intercontinental Welterweight Championship (1 time)
- IWRG Intercontinental Middleweight Championship (1 time)
- IWRG Intercontinental Tag Team Championship (2 times) - with Star Boy
- Rey del Ring: 2004
- Copa Higher Power (1997) – with Dr. Cerebro, Mr. Águila, Neblina and Tony Rivera

== Luchas de Apuestas record ==
Winner (wager)	Loser (wager)	Location	Event	Date	Notes
Fantasy (mask)	Rey Cuervo (mask)	Naucalpan, Mexico State	IWRG Live event	May 16, 1999	
Fantasy (mask)	Bombero Infernal (hair)	Naucalpan, Mexico State	IWRG Live event	September 16, 2001	
El Hijo del Diablo (mask)	Fantasy (mask)	Naucalpan, Mexico State	IWRG Live event	November 3, 2002	
Fantasy (hair)	Mike Segura (hair)	Naucalpan, Mexico State	IWRG Live event	December 28, 2003	
Fantasy (hair)	Cyborg (hair)	Naucalpan, Mexico State	IWRG Live event	May 9, 2004	
Fantasy (hair)	Star Boy (hair)	Naucalpan, Mexico State	IWRG Live event	May 30, 2005	
