= Disturbio =

Mexican professional wrestler

Personal information
- Born: Israel Aguilar Alvarez; March 30, 1979 (age 47) Mexico
- Spouse: Princesa Dorada
- Website: Facebook page

Professional wrestling career
- Ring name: Disturbio
- Billed height: 1.68 m (5 ft 6 in)
- Billed weight: 85 kg (187 lb)
- Trained by: Arturo Beristain
- Debut: December 22, 2004

Israel Aguilar Alvarez (born March 30, 1979), better known by his ring name Disturbio, is a Mexican professional wrestler, who works for promotion Consejo Mundial de Lucha Libre (CMLL).

== Professional wrestling career ==
Aguilar made his professional wrestling debut on December 22, 2004, On January 31, 2008, Disturbio lost a Lucha de Apuestas, or "bet match", which meant Disturbio had all his hair shaved off. In April, Disturbio had a try out match for Consejo Mundial de Lucha Libre (CMLL), the world's oldest wrestling promotion, when he teamed up with Zayco to defeat the team of Frisbee and Tiger Kid. On December 14, he competed in the 2008 version of Toryumon's Young Dragons Cup in a torneo cibernetico, multi-man elimination match that also included Adam Bridle, Miedo, Ministro, Super Camaleon, Trauma I and Trauma II and was won by Satoshi Kajiwara.

=== Consejo Mundial de Lucha Libre (2009–present) ===
Disturbio began working regularly for CMLL in 2009, making his Arena Mexico debut on CMLL's main show, Super Viernes on April 9, 2009, as he teamed up with Durango Kid to defeat Bengala and Delta. A week later he was teamed up with El Terrible to participate in the 2010 Gran Alternativa ("Great Alternative Tournament"), where a rookie and a veteran wrestler teams up for a tag team tournament. Disturbio and El Terrible lost to Atlantis and Inquisidor in the opening round. In 2011, Disturbio began working regularly with fellow low card rudo Boby Zavala, forming a regular tag team. Disturbio participated in the first ever Torneo Sangre Nueva ("New Blood Tournament") on March 6, 2012, but was eliminated in the preliminary torneo cibernetico elimination match when he was pinned by Super Halcón Jr. after having pinned Robin earlier in the match. In the fall of 2012, Disturbio and Zavala began a long running, escalating storyline against the tecnico ("good guy character") team of Leono and Tigre Blanco. The two teams clashed on multiple occasions, building the rivalry until the two teams faced off in a double Luchas de Apuestas match where both teams put their hair on the line in the match. The match took place on January 1, 2013, and saw Leono and Tigre Blanco lose and for the first time in their careers shaved bald as a result of the loss. Disturbio participated in the 2013 Torneo Sangre Nueva, but like in 2012, he was eliminated in the preliminary round by Guerrero Negro Jr. In March 2013, Disturbio was announced as one of the novatos (or rookies), in the 2013 Torneo Gran Alternativa. Disturbio would team up with veteran Volador Jr. and compete in Block A on April 12. The duo defeated Robin and Máximo in the first round, but lost to Guerrero Negro Jr. and Último Guerrero in the second round. In May 2015, Disturbio competed in a qualifying match for the 2015 version of En Busca de un Ídolo as one of 16 wrestlers in the qualifying torneo cibernetico elimination match where the last eight wrestlers would qualify for the tournament. He competed against Akuma, Blue Panther Jr., Cancerbero, Canelo Casas, Delta, Esfinge, Flyer, El Gallo, Guerrero Maya Jr., Joker, Pegasso, Raziel, Sagrado, Stigma and Boby Zavala. Disturbio was one of eight wrestlers to qualify for the main portion of the tournament.

In January 2018, Disturbio participated in his first tour of Japan, at Fantastica Mania 2018, promoted jointly with CMLL's Japanese partner New Japan Pro-Wrestling (NJPW). He worked all eight tour dates, with notable victories over Star Jr., the team of Star Jr. and Drone and the team of Atlantis, Drone, Místico and Volador Jr., but lost on the other five nights of the tour.

On January 1, 2022, Disturbio participated in the "Sin Salida" (No Exit) special event. The match is held inside a cage, where 12 wrestlers (in this case, 11 wrestlers) participate to save their hair or masks. The participants; Disturbio, Dulce Gardenia, Sangre Imperial, Audaz, Okumura, El Coyote, Pegasso, Stigma, Espíritu Negro, Akuma and Nitro escaped one by one until Disturbio and Gardenia had to fight to save their hair in a round without time limit. At the end of the event, Disturbio had to be shaved.

== Championships and accomplishments ==
- Comisión de Box y Lucha Libre Mexico D.F.
  - Mexican National Trios Championship (1 time) – with Apocalipsis and El Cholo

== Luchas de Apuestas record ==
Winner (wager)	Loser (wager)	Location	Event	Date	Notes
Leono (hair)	Disturbio (hair)	Ciudad Neza, Mexico State	CMLL Live event	January 31, 2008	
Boby Zavala and Disturbio (hair)	Leono and Tigre Blanco (hair)	Mexico City	Live event	January 1, 2013	
Metálico (hair)	Disturbio (hair)	Mexico City	CMLL Show	May 5, 2019	
Dulce Gardenia (hair)	Disturbio (hair)	Mexico City	Sin Salida	January 1, 2022	(Note: Steel cage match that also included Okumura, Nitro, Pegasso, Stigma, Akuma, Espíritu Negro, Sangre Imperial, Audaz and El Coyote)
