= Raziel (wrestler) =

Mexican professional wrestler (1973–2022)

Personal information
- Born: 8 February 1973 Mexico City, Mexico
- Died: 4 April 2022 (aged 49)

Professional wrestling career
- Ring name(s): Caligula; Neo; Raziel
- Billed height: 1.73 m (5 ft 8 in)
- Billed weight: 85 kg (187 lb)
- Trained by: Brazo Cibernetico; Skayde; Satánico; Virus; Tony Salazar
- Debut: 1996

Raziel (8 February 1973 – 4 April 2022) was the ring name of a Mexican professional wrestler, best known for his work in Consejo Mundial de Lucha Libre (CMLL).

Raziel's real name is not on public record, as is often the case with masked wrestlers in Mexico where their private lives are kept a secret from the wrestling fans. He previously worked as Caligula for many years, forming the team Los Romanos along with Messala (who is now known as Cancerbero). The name "Raziel" is taken from the Archangel Raziel in Jewish mysticism, and is sometimes also written as "Raciel".

== Professional wrestling career ==
The wrestler who was known as Raziel trained under Skayde and Brazo Cibernetico and was considered one of their top pupils at the time. Upon his debut in 1996 he adopted the ring persona "Neo", teaming up with a fellow Skayde/Alvarado graduate who wrestled as "Geo", both enmascarados (masked wrestlers) who wrestled a high-flying style. Early in their careers the duo worked for Asistencia Asesoría y Administración (AAA), and were part of a group called Los Cadetos del Espacio ("The Space Cadets") for a brief period of time. After their stint in AAA they worked for the short lived Promo Azteca promotion as well as International Wrestling Revolution Group before changing their ring characters.

=== Los Romanos ===
In 2005 he began working for Consejo Mundial de Lucha Libre (CMLL) and was teamed up with another recent CMLL signee. CMLL gave Neo a new identity as Caligula, named after the Roman Emperor Caligula, the ring persona was that of a Roman soldier complete with a mask designed to look like a Roman soldier's helmet. His teammate was named Messala and given a similar Roman inspired gimmick and collectively they became known as Los Romanos ("The Romans"). The team worked as low ranked rudos ("bad guys") who mainly worked with young wrestlers to give them in-ring experience and to assess their talent. On 15 June 2008, Los Romanos participated in a tournament for the vacant CMLL Arena Coliseo Tag Team Championship but the experienced team lost to the makeshift team of Ángel Azteca, Jr. and Máscara Purpura in the first round. Los Romanos remained firmly placed in the opening or low card position throughout 2008 and into 2009.

=== Los Cancerberos del Infierno ===
On 18 November 2009, CMLL presented a new Rudo group, Los Cancerberos del Infierno ("The Infernal Cerberus") a team led by veteran mid-carder Virus and consisted of rookies Pólvora and Euforia as well as two new characters never used before: Raziel and Cancerbero. It was later revealed that Raziel and Cancerbero were not two new wrestlers, but the repackaged Los Romanos with Caligula changing his name to Raziel and Messala being turned into Cancerbero. In late 2009 Los Cancerberos participated in a tournament to crown new Mexican National Trios Champion, Virus, Pólvora, and Euforia represented the group and defeated Los Ángeles Celestiales (Ángel Azteca, Jr., Ángel de Plata and Ángel de Oro) in the first round. Following the tournament loss Los Ángeles Celestiales and Los Cancerberos del Infierno have developed a rivalry between the two groups, facing off on various CMLL shows, including their Friday night CMLL Super Viernes show. On 15 January 2010, Super Viernes Raziel defeated Ángel de Plata in a Lighting match, continuing the building storyline between the two factions. In May 2015 Raziel competed in a qualifying match for the 2015 version of En Busca de un Ídolo alongside 15 other wrestlers Raziel competed in a torneo cibernetico, elimination match where the last eight wrestlers would qualify for the tournament. He competed against Akuma, Blue Panther Jr., Cancerbero, Canelo Casas, Delta, Disturbio, Esfinge, Flyer, El Gallo, Guerrero Maya Jr., Joker, Pegasso, Sagrado, Stigma and Boby Zavala. Raziel was the second wrestler eliminated as he was pinned by Guerrero Maya Jr. On 25 December 2015 as part of CMLL's annual Infierno en el Ring show Raziel was one of twelve men risking their mask in the main event steel cage match. He was the tenth man to leave the cage, keeping his mask safe in the process. In January 2017, Raziel made his Japanese debut by taking part in Fantastica Mania 2017, the annual tour co-produced by CMLL and New Japan Pro-Wrestling (NJPW).

== Death ==
Raziel died on April 4, 2022, at 49. He was survived by his nephew, fellow luchador Látigo.

== Championships and accomplishments ==
- Consejo Mundial de Lucha Libre
  - Mexican National Trios Championship (1 time) – with Cancerbero and Virus
