= Cancerbero =

Mexican professional wrestler

Personal information
- Born: Daniel Nuñez Hernandez; June 11, 1977 (age 49) Mexico City, Mexico

Professional wrestling career
- Ring name(s): El Potro; El Monsturo I Mesalla; Cancerbero
- Billed height: 1.80 m (5 ft 11 in)
- Billed weight: 90 kg (198 lb)
- Trained by: Tony Salazar; Carrillo Cuchillo; Satánico
- Debut: February 1997

Daniel Nuñez Hernandez (born June 11, 1977), better known by his ring name Cancerbero, is a Mexican professional wrestler, working for the Mexican promotion Consejo Mundial de Lucha Libre (CMLL). Cancerbero is a member of Los Cancerberos del Infierno ("The Infernal Cerberusses"), under the leadership of Virus. Cancerbero previously worked as Mesalla for many years, forming the team Los Romanos along with Caligula (who was later known as Raziel). The name Cancerbero is Spanish for Cerberus, the three-headed hound, which according to Greek mythology, guards the entrance to Hell.

== Professional wrestling career ==
Hernandez began his wrestling career using the ring name El Potro ("The Colt") and later on wrestled as El Monstruo I, teaming with El Monstruo II. El Monstruo I was unmasked by Gran Cuchillo on December 8, 2002 when he lost a Lucha de Apuesta, bet match.

=== Consejo Mundial de Lucha Libre (2002–present) ===
==== Los Romanos (2005–2009) ====
In 2005 he began working for Consejo Mundial de Lucha Libre (CMLL) and was teamed up with another recent CMLL signee. CMLL gave Hernandez a new identity as Messala, the ring persona was that of a Roman soldier complete with a mask designed to look like a Roman soldier's helmet. His teammate was named Caligula and given a similar Roman inspired gimmick and collectively they became known as Los Romanos ("The Romans"). The team worked as low ranked Rudos (bad guys) who mainly worked with young wrestlers to give them in-ring experience and to assess their talent. On June 15, 2008 Los Romanos participated in a tournament for the vacant CMLL Arena Coliseo Tag Team Championship but the experienced team lost to the makeshift team of Ángel Azteca Jr. and Máscara Purpura in the first round. Los Romanos remained firmly placed in the opening or low card position throughout 2008 and into 2009.

==== Los Cancerberos del Infierno (2009–present) ====
On November 18, 2009 CMLL presented a new Rudo group that they had formed, Los Cancerberos del Infierno ("The Infernal Cerberus") a team led by veteran mid-carder Virus and consisted of rookies Pólvora and Euforia as well as two new characters never used before - Raziel and Cancerbero. It was later revealed that Raziel and Cancerbero were not two new wrestlers CMLL brought in but actually the repackaged Los Romanos with Caligula changing his name to Raziel and Messala being turned into Cancerbero. In late 2009 Los Cancerberos participated in a tournament to crown new Mexican National Trios Champion, Virus, Pólvora and Euforia represented the group and defeated Los Ángeles Celestiales (Ángel Azteca Jr., Ángel de Plata and Ángel de Oro) in the first round. Following the tournament loss Los Ángeles Celestiales and Los Cancerberos del Infierno have developed a rivalry between the two groups, facing off on various CMLL shows, including their Friday night CMLL Super Viernes show. In May, Cancerbero competed in a qualifying match for the 2015 version of En Busca de un Ídolo as one of 16 wrestlers in a torneo cibernetico, elimination match where the last eight wrestlers would qualify for the tournament. He competed against Akuma, Blue Panther Jr., Canelo Casas, Delta, Disturbio, Esfinge, Flyer, El Gallo, Guerrero Maya Jr., Joker, Pegasso, Raziel, Sagrado, Stigma and Boby Zavala. He was the fourth wrestler eliminated, pinned by Delta. On December 25, 2015 as part of CMLL's annual Infierno en el Ring show Cancerbero was one of twelve men risking their mask in the main event steel cage match. He was the fourth man to leave the cage, keeping his mask safe in the process.

== Championships and accomplishments ==
- Consejo Mundial de Lucha Libre
  - Mexican National Trios Championship (1 time) – with Raziel and Virus
- Mexican Independent Circuit
  - Arena Nueva Aragon Tag Team Championship (1 time) – with El Monstruo II

== Luchas de Apuestas record ==
Winner (wager)	Loser (wager)	Location	Event	Date	Notes
Gran Cuchillo (mask)	El Monstrou I (mask)	N/A	Live event	December 8, 2002	
