= Franco Colombo =

Italian footballer

Personal information
- Full name: Franco Ermanno Colombo
- Date of birth: 10 October 1917
- Place of birth: Legnano, Lombardy, Italy
- Position: Defender

Senior career*
Years	Team	Apps	(Gls)
1934–1937	Legnano	41	(0)
1937–1939	Ambrosiana-Inter	2	(0)
1939–1940	Gallaratese		
1940–1941	Lucchese	13	(0)
1941–1943	M.A.T.E.R.		
- * Club domestic league appearances and goals

Franco Ermanno Colombo (born 10 October 1917, in Legnano) was an Italian professional football player.
