= CMLL Sin Salida =

Mexican professional wrestling supercard show series

Sin Salida
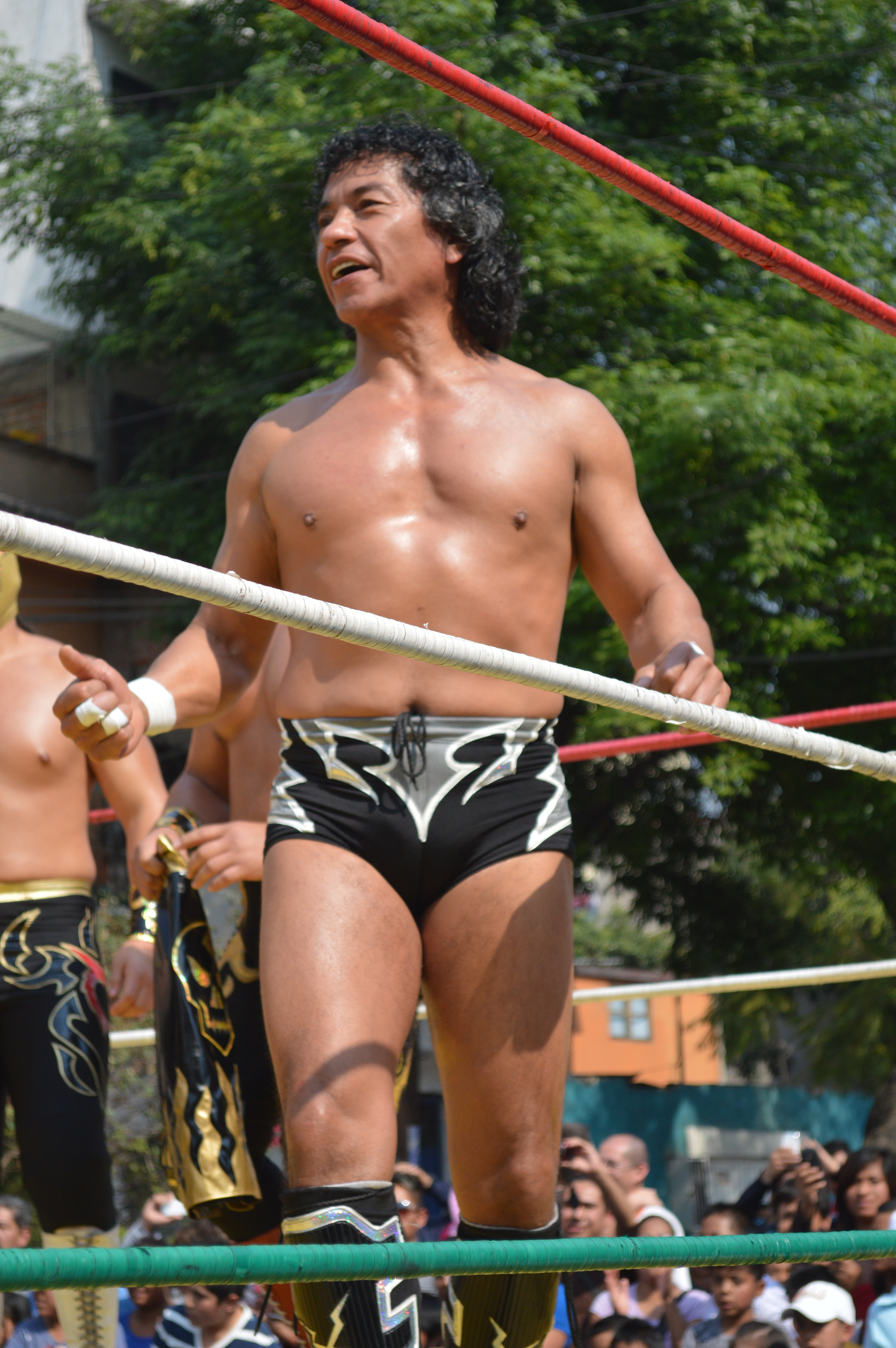
- Negro Casas, the only wrestlers to work on all Sin Salida shows.
- Promotions: Consejo Mundial de Lucha Libre
- First event: 2009
- Last event: 2025
- Signature matches: Lucha de Apuestas

Sin Salida (Spanish for "No Escape") is the collective name of a series of intermittently major professional wrestling, or Lucha Libre, shows held by the Mexican professional wrestling promotion professional wrestling promotion Consejo Mundial de Lucha Libre (CMLL). The main event of each of the shows has featured one or more wrestlers putting their hair on the line in a Lucha de Apuesta, or bet match. In 2009 and 2010 the theme of the main event was "Mexico vs. Japan" as CMLL regulars faced off against wrestlers from CMLL's partner promotion in Japan New Japan Pro-Wrestling (NJPW) and marked the end of extended tours for Yujiro Takahashi, Tetsuya Naito and Taichi Ishikari. In 2013 10 Mini-Estrellas put their hair or their wrestling mask on the line in a Steel cage elimination match where the last man, Pequeño Violencia was shaved bald. CMLL held their most recent Sin Salida show on July 19, 2015.

== Event history ==
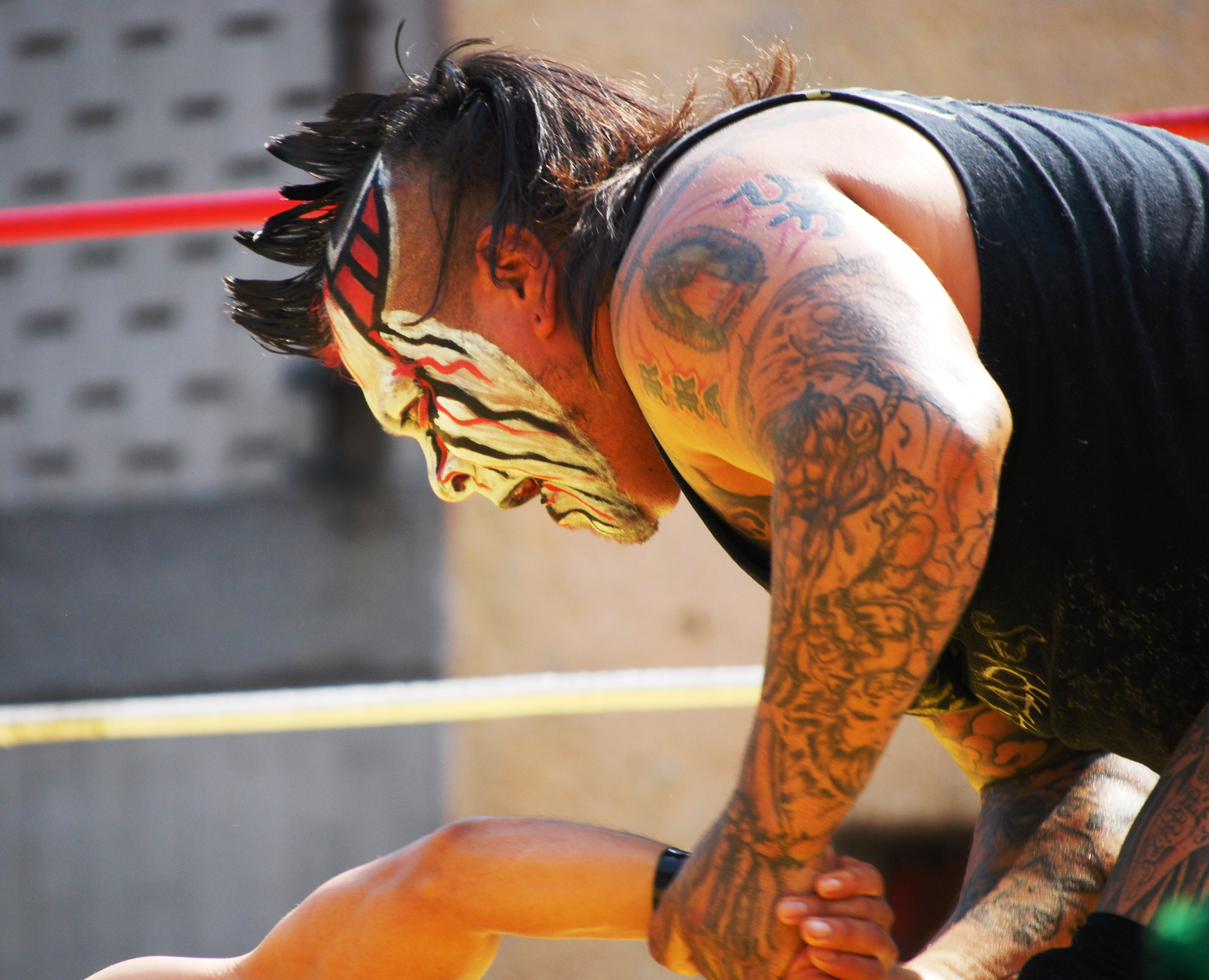
Demus 3:16, work three of the four Sin Salida shows.

The first CMLL event promoted under the Sin Salida name took place on December 4, 2009 and replaced Sin Piedad ("Without Mercy") as CMLL's end-of-year show that year. The event took place on Friday night which is tradition for most of CMLL's major shows and replaced the regular CMLL Super Viernes ("Super Friday") show. To date all Sin Salida shows have taken place in Arena México, in Mexico City, CMLL's main venue. CMLL has held 24 matches split over the four shows so far featuring a total of 78 individual wrestlers. Of those 78 wrestlers 11 of those were from the Mini-Estrella division and six were from CMLL's female division. Negro Casas is the only competitor to work on all four Sin Salida shows. Demus 3:16 worked the 2009 show under the ring name Pequeño Damián 666, while Diamante Azul worked the 2010 event as "Metro" and the 2013 and 2015 event under his current ring name. Each year the main event has featured a Lucha de Apuesta ("Bet match") as their main event, the most important type of match in Lucha Libre. Five men have had to have all their hair shaved off as a result of losing a match, Rey Escorpión, Japanese wrestlers Yujiro Takahashi, Tetsuya Naito and Taichi Ishikari and Mini-Estrella, Pequeño Violencia. In the 2013 event Aéreo, Eléctrico, Fantasy and Pequeño Nitro bet their wrestling mask on the outcome of the match but all escaped the cage to preserve their masks.

The 2009 show saw CMLL World Tag Team Champions Volador Jr. and La Sombra successfully defend their championship against Los Hijos del Averno (Mephisto and Ephesto) in the semi-final match of the night. The 2013 Sin Salida show saw Máscara Dorada defeat Negro Casas to win the NWA World Historic Welterweight Championship in what has so far been the only championship change on a Sin Salida show. Sin Salida has not yet hosted any of CMLL's annual tournaments.

== Dates, venues, and main events ==
Year	Date	Main event	Ref
2009	December 4	El Texano, Jr. and El Terrible vs. No Limit (Yujiro and Naito) - Lucha de Apuestas hair vs. hair best two-out-of-three falls tag team match	
2010	June 6	Máximo vs. Taichi - Lucha de Apuestas hair vs. hair best two-out-of-three falls match	
2013	June 2	Aéreo vs. Bam Bam vs. Demus 3:16 vs. Eléctrico vs. Fantasy vs. Mercurio vs. Pequeño Black Warrior vs. Pequeño Nitro vs. Pequeño Violencia vs. Shockercito - Lucha de Apuestas mask vs. hair steel cage match	
2015	July 17	Último Guerrero vs. Rey Escorpión - Lucha de Apuestas hair vs. hair best two-out-of-three falls match	
2017	December 25	Starman vs. El Hijo del Signo vs. Raziel vs. Cancerbero vs. Fiero vs. Nitro vs. Oro Jr. vs. Pegasso vs. Star Jr. vs. Templario - Lucha de Apuestas mask vs. mask steel cage match	
2022	January 1	Akuma vs. Audaz vs. Dulce Gardenia vs. El Coyote vs. Espiritu Negro vs. Nitro vs. Okumura vs. Pegasso vs. Sangre Imperial vs. Stigma vs. Disturbio - Lucha de Apuestas mask vs. hair steel cage match	
2023	January 1	Bengala vs. Difunto vs. Inquisidor vs. Millenium vs. Neon vs. Nitro vs. Oro Jr. vs. Principe Odin Jr. vs. Retro vs. Valiente Jr. vs. Zandokan Jr. vs. Apocalipsis - Lucha de Apuestas mask vs. mask steel cage match	
2024	January 1	Acero vs. Aereo vs. Angelito vs. Fantasy vs. Full Metal vs. Galaxy vs. Kaligua vs. Mercurio vs. Minos vs. Pequeno Magia vs. Pequeno Olimpico vs. Pequeno Polvora vs. Pequeno Violencia vs. Pierrothito vs. Ultimo Dragoncito vs. Shockercito - Lucha de Apuestas mask vs. hair steel cage match	
2025	January 1	Último Dragoncito vs. Shockercito vs. Pequeño Pierroth vs. Galaxy vs. Pequeño Magia vs. Kaligua vs. Angelito vs. Full Metal vs. Rostro de Acero vs. Pequeño Pólvora vs. Pequeño Olímpico vs. Pequeño Violencia - Lucha de Apuestas mask vs. hair steel cage match	
2026	January 2	Astral vs. Blue Shark vs. Calavera Jr. I vs. Calavera Jr. II vs. Cancerbero vs. Diamond vs. El Coyote vs. El Vigia vs. Electrico vs. Espiritu Negro vs. Oro Jr. vs. Polvora vs. Rey Cometa vs. Sangre Imperial vs. Virus vs. Robin - Lucha de Apuestas mask vs. hair steel cage match	
