= Pequeño Reyes del Aire =

Consejo Mundial de Lucha Libre tournament

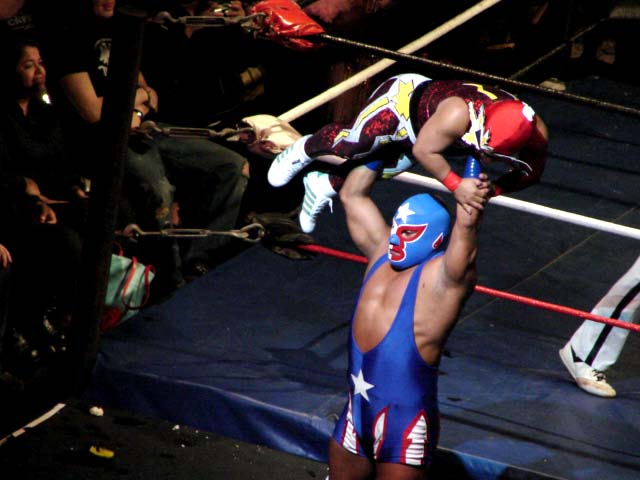
- Pierrothito pressing Tsuki, both have competed in the Pequeños Reyes del Aire tournaments

Details
- Promotion: Consejo Mundial de Lucha Libre
- Date established: July 13, 2007
- Current champion: Eléctrico
- Date won: January 5, 2014
Statistics
- First champion: Pequeño Damián 666
- Most reigns: Pequeño Black Warrior (2)
- Youngest champion: Mascarita Dorada (25 years, 319 days)
- Heaviest champion: Pequeño Damián 666/Demus 3:16 (80 kg (180 lb))
- Lightest champion: Mascarita Dorada (50 kg (110 lb))

The Pequeño Reyes del Aire Tournament (Spanish for the "Little Kings of the Air") is an annual wrestling tournament promoted by the Mexican professional wrestling promotion Consejo Mundial de Lucha Libre (CMLL) and has been held since 2007, holding two tournaments in 2012, and one every other year. The tournament includes a varying number of wrestlers, competing in a Torneo cibernetico match, essentially a multi-man elimination match with the last competitor remaining is declared that year's Pequeño Rey del Aire and is given a trophy. The match is based on CMLL's Reyes del Aire tournament which has an identical purpose, format and award. The winner is not normally awarded with a match for the CMLL World Mini-Estrella Championship or the Mexican National Lightweight Championship, the two Mini-Estrellas championships that CMLL promotes, as a direct result of their tournament victory but has as times been used to build but either a championship match or storylines between rival wrestlers.

There has been a total of ten tournaments held as of January 2015, with nine different winners, only Pequeño Black Warrior has won the tournament twice. A total of 27 Mini-Estrellas have appeared in the nine tournaments held so far, two wrestlers have appeared in eight of the Pequeños Reyes del Aire, Pequeño Olímpico and Pequeño Damián 666 / Demus 3:16. Demus 3:16 has the most eliminations, with nine while Último Dragoncito has eliminated 9 men. Only 4 men have competed without eliminating a single opponent Fire, Mini Maximo, Sombrita and Stukita. (Note: The statistics are supported by the source for each individual tournament.) Mascarita Dorada is the youngest tournament winner ever, at 25 years of age when he won the 2008 tournament while Fantasy is the youngest competitor ever, 18 years old when he entered the 2007 tournament. Pequeño Black Warrior is the oldest tournament winner, he was 42 years old when he won the 2012 Guadalajara tournament, while Pierrothito was 46 years old when he competed in the 2014 tournament making him the oldest competitor overall.

== Pequeños Reyes del Aire tournament winners ==
Year	Winner	Date	Note
2007	Pequeño Damián 666	July 13, 2007	
2008	Mascarita Dorada	January 4, 2008	
2009	Pequeño Black Warrior	January 6, 2009	
2010	Pequeño Nitro	March 7, 2010	
2011	Pequeño Olímpico	February 6, 2011	
2012 (Mexico City)	Último Dragóncito	May 1, 2012	
2012 (Guadalajara)	Pequeño Black Warrior	October 30, 2012	
2013	Aéreo	January 6, 2013	
2014	Eléctrico	January 5, 2014	
2015	Shockercito	January 6, 2015	

== Pequeño Reyes del Aire participants ==
Name	Tournaments	Year
Acero	3	2009, 2012 #1, 2013
Aéreo	3	2012 #1, 2012 #2, 2013
Astral	5	2011, 2012 #1, 2012 #2, 2014, 2015
Bam Bam	6	2007, 2008, 2009, 2010, 2012 #1, 2013
Bracito de Oro	1	2007
Demus 3:16 / Pequeño Damián 666	8	2007, 2008, 2009, 2010, 2012 #1, 2012 #2, 2014, 2015
Electrico	6	2007, 2010, 2011, 2012 #1, 2014, 2015
Fantasy	7	2007, 2008, 2011, 2012 #1, 2012 #2, 2013, 2015
Fire	2	2007, 2008
Mascarita Dorada	3	2008, 2009, 2011
Mercurio	6	2011, 2012 #1, 2012 #2, 2013, 2014, 2015
Mini Maximo	1	2011
Mr. Águilita	3	2007, 2008, 2009
Pequeño Black Warrior	6	2008, 2009, 2010, 2012 #1, 2012 #2, 2013
Pequeño Halcón	3	2012 #1, 2012 #2, 2013
Pequeño Halloween	3	2007, 2008, 2009
Pequeño Ninja	1	2009
Pequeño Nitro	6	2010, 2011, 2012 #1, 2013, 2014, 2015
Pequeño Olímpico	8	2007, 2010, 2011, 2012 #1, 2012 #2, 2013, 2014, 2015
Pequeño Universo 2000	3	2010, 2012 #1, 2013
Pequeño Violencia	6	2009, 2010, 2011, 2012 #1, 2012 #2, 2013
Pierrothito	5	2011, 2012 #1, 2012 #2, 2014, 2015
Shockercito	6	2008, 2010, 2012 #2, 2013, 2014, 2015
Sombrita	1	2007
Stukita	1	2014
Tzuki	1	2008
Último Dragóncito	6	2009, 2010, 2012 #1, 2012 #2, 2014, 2015

== Pequeños Reyes del Aire (2007) ==
Pequeños Reyes del Aire (2007)
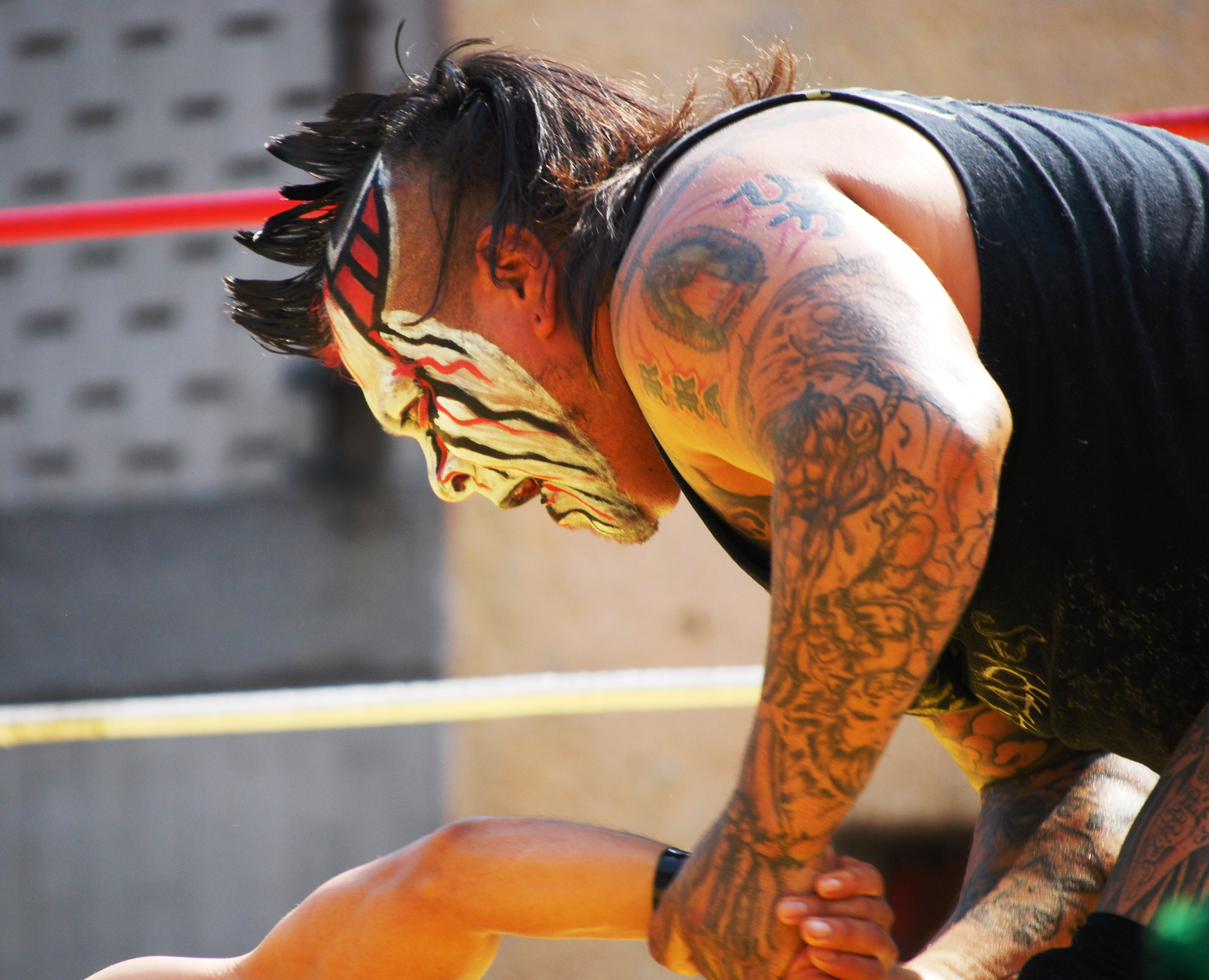
- Pequeño Damián 666, tournament winner
- Promotion: Consejo Mundial de Lucha Libre
- Date: July 13, 2007
- City: Mexico City, Mexico
- Venue: Arena Mexico

Event chronology
← Previous; Torneo Gran Alternativa	Next → CMLL 74th Anniversary Show

Pequeños Reyes del Aire chronology
← Previous; First	Next → 2008

CMLL held their first Pequeños Reyes del Aire tournament in 2007, two years after they created the Reyes del Aire for the regular roster. The match was part of CMLL's regular Friday night show CMLL Super Viernes ("Super Friday") on July 13, 2007 as a special attraction match on the under card. The wrestlers had to compete in a 10-man torneo cibernetico elimination match to win the Pequeños Reyes del Aire trophy. In 2005 the match included Bam Bam, Bracito de Oro, Eléctrico, Fantasy, Fire, Mr. Águilita, Pequeño Damián 666, Pequeño Halloween, Sombrita and Pequeño Olímpico (then reigning CMLL World Mini-Estrella Champion). Pequeño Damián 666 would win the match, eliminating Bam Bam as the last opponent to take the victory. Four months after his 2007 Pequeños Reyes del Aire victory Pequeño Damián 666 would defeat Pequeño Olímpico to win the CMLL World Mini-Estrella Championship, although the title match was not a direct prize of the tournament Pequeño Damián 666's victory did elevate him up the contenders ranks.

Pequeños Reyes del Aire (2007) order of elimination

Order	Wrestler	Eliminated by
1	Sombrita	Bracito de Oro
2	Eléctrico	Mr. Águilita
3	Fire	Fantasy
4	Bracito de Oro	Pequeño Halloween
5	Mr. Águilita	Bam Bam
6	Fantasy	Pequeño Damián 666
7	Pequeño Olímpico	Pequeño Damián 666 and Pequeño Halloween
8	Pequeño Halloween	Bam Bam
9	Bam Bam	Pequeño Damián 666
10	Pequeño Damián 666	Winner

== Pequeños Reyes del Aire (2008) ==
Pequeños Reyes del Aire (2008)
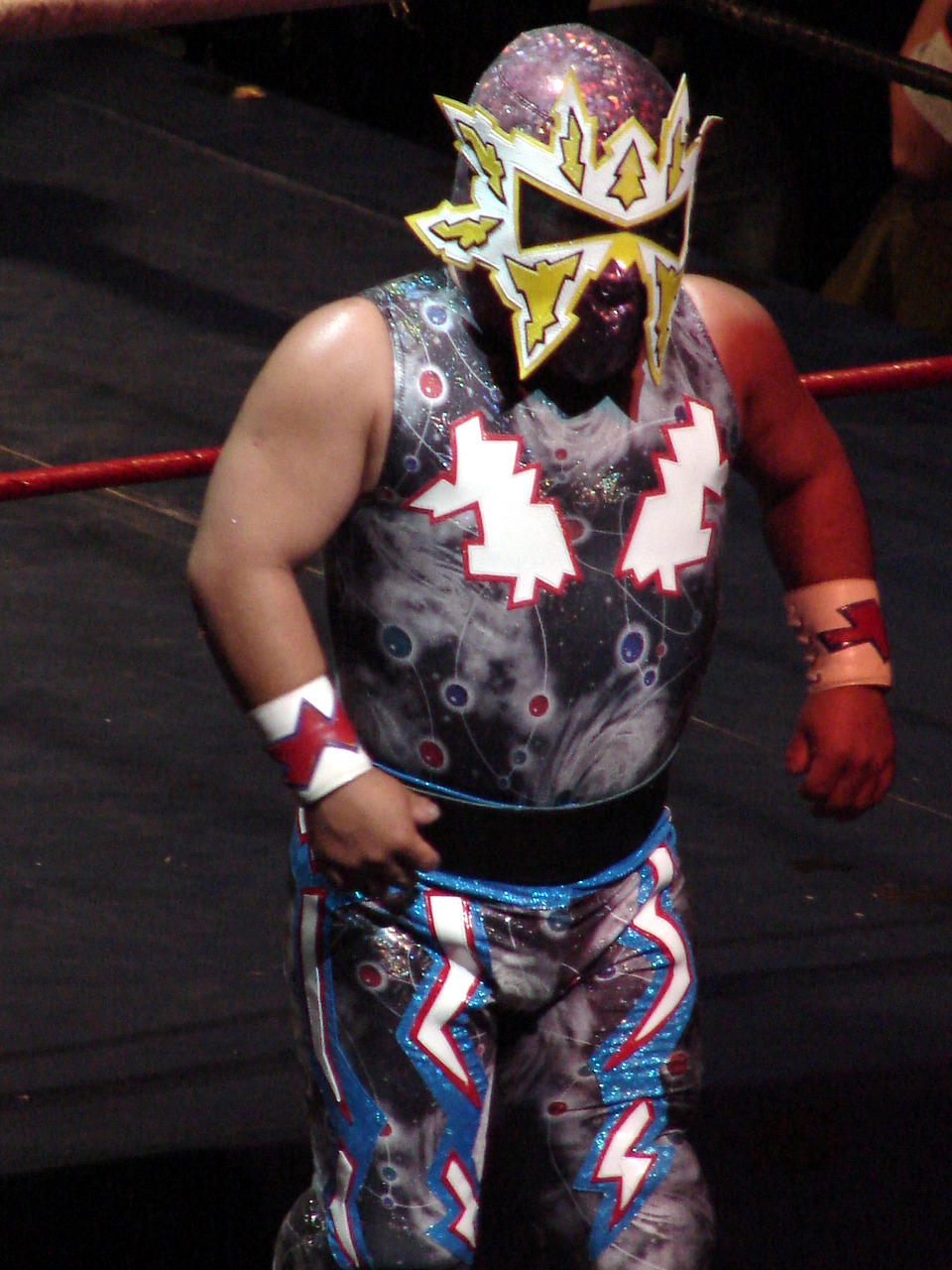
- Tzuki, only appeared in the 2008 tournament
- Promotion: Consejo Mundial de Lucha Libre
- Date: January 6, 2008
- City: Mexico City, Mexico
- Venue: Arena Mexico

Event chronology
← Previous; Sin Piedad	Next → Homenaje a Dos Leyendas

Pequeños Reyes del Aire chronology
← Previous; 2007	Next → 2009

CMLL held their second ever Pequeños Reyes del Aire tournament on January 6, 2008 and like the previous year it was a torneo cibernetico elimination match where the last survivor of the match would be crowned that year's Pequeño Rey del Aire. Among the participants was the then reigning CMLL World Mini-Estrella Champion Pequeño Damián 666, who was actually the first man eliminated from the match. Other tournament participants included Bam Bam, Fantasy, Fire, Mascarita Dorada, Mr. Águilita, Pequeño Black Warrior, Pequeño Halloween, Shockercito and Tzuki. The winner of the match was Mascarita Dorada, who had only worked for CMLL for a few months at the time and was in the middle of being built up as the focal point of the Mini-Estrellas division.

Pequeños Reyes del Aire (2008) order of elimination

Order	Wrestler	Eliminated by
1	Fire	Fantasy
2	Shockercito	Mr. Águilita
3	Fantasy	Pequeño Black Warrior
4	Mr. Águilita	Bam Bam
5	Pequeño Black Warrior	Tzuki
6	Tzuki	Pequeño Halloween
7	Pequeño Halloween	Bam Bam
8	Bam Bam	Pequeño Damián 666
9	Pequeño Damián 666	Mascarita Dorada
10	Mascarita Dorada	Winner

== Pequeños Reyes del Aire (2009) ==
Pequeños Reyes del Aire (2009)
- Promotion: Consejo Mundial de Lucha Libre
- Date: January 6, 2009
- City: Mexico City, Mexico
- Venue: Arena Coliseo

Event chronology
← Previous; Leyenda de Azul	Next → La Hora Cero

Pequeños Reyes del Aire chronology
← Previous; 2008	Next → 2010

The third annual Pequeños Reyes del Aire tournament took place on Tuesday January 6, 2009 in Arena Coliseo, the first Pequeños Reyes del Aire tournament to take place outside of Arena México. The torneo cibernetic featured nine wrestlers in total, Bam Bam, Mr. Águilita, Niño de Acero, Pequeño Black Warrior, Pequeño Damián 666, Pequeño Halloween, Pequeño Violencia, Pequeño Ninja and Último Dragóncito. The final of the tournament saw Pequeño Black Warrior pin Último Dragóncito to win the 2009 tournament.

Pequeños Reyes del Aire (2009) order of elimination

Order	Wrestler	Eliminated by
1	Mr. Águilita	Nino de Acero
2	Bam Bam	Pequeño Damián 666
3	Niño de Acero	Pequeño Halloween
4	Pequeño Damián 666	Último Dragóncito
5	Pequeño Halloween	Pequeño Ninja (double pin)
5	Pequeño Ninja	Pequeño Halloween (double pin)
7	Pequeño Violencia	Mascarita Dorada
8	Último Dragóncito	Referee stoppage
9	Mascarita Dorada	Pequeño Black Warrior
10	Pequeño Black Warrior	Winner

== Pequeños Reyes del Aire (2010) ==
Pequeños Reyes del Aire (2010)
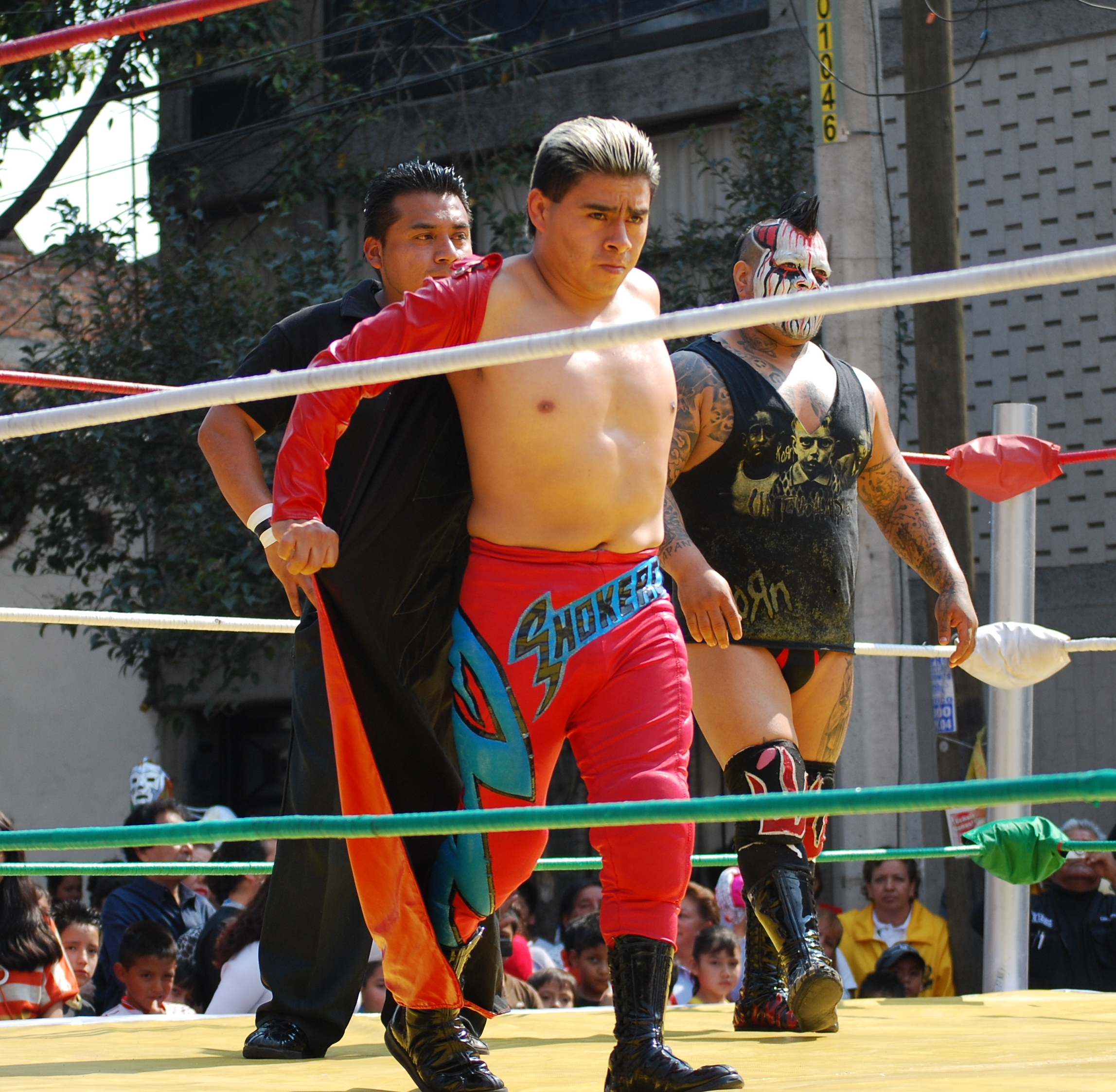
- Shockercito, one of the 2010 participants
- Promotion: Consejo Mundial de Lucha Libre
- Date: March 7, 2010
- City: Mexico City, Mexico
- Venue: Arena Coliseo

Event chronology
← Previous; Torneo de Parejas Increíbles	Next → Homenaje a Dos Leyendas

Pequeños Reyes del Aire chronology
← Previous; 2009	Next → 2011

The fourth annual Pequeños Reyes del Aire took place on March 7, 2010 in Mexico City, Mexico, during CMLL's Domingos de Coliseo weekly event in Arena Coliseo. For the first time in the tournament's history Pequeño Halloween did not participate as he had left CMLL not long before the match. Also absent was the 2008 winner Mascarita Dorada as well as the holder of the secondary Mini-Estrellas title, the Mexican National Lightweight Championship Pierrothito, with no explanation of their exclusion. The match did include the holder of the CMLL World Mini-Estrella Championship Bam Bam and was the first Pequeños Reyes del Aire tournament for Pequeño Nitro and Pequeño Universo 2000 and had the repeated appearance of Eléctrico, Pequeño Black Warrior, Pequeño Damián 666, Pequeño Olímpico, Pequeño Violencia, Shockercito and Último Dragóncito which made for the most participants in the tournament yet. The tournament was won by relative newcomer Pequeño Nitro who earned a shot at the CMLL World Mini-Estrellas Championship the following week. Pequeño Nitro was unsuccessful in his title challenge.

Pequeños Reyes del Aire (2010) order of elimination

Order	Wrestler	Eliminated by
1	Pequeño Universo 2000	Shockercito
2	Pequeño Olímpico	Pequeño Violencia
3	Shockercito	Pequeño Black Warrior
4	Pequeño Violencia	Eléctrico
5	Pequeño Black Warrior	Último Dragóncito
6	Eléctrico	Pequeño Damián 666
7	Pequeño Damián 666	Último Dragóncito
8	Último Dragóncito	Pequeño Nitro
9	Bam Bam	Pequeño Nitro
10	Pequeño Nitro	Winner

== Pequeños Reyes del Aire (2011) ==
Pequeños Reyes del Aire (2011)
- Promotion: Consejo Mundial de Lucha Libre
- Date: February 5, 2011
- City: Mexico City, Mexico
- Venue: Arena Coliseo

Event chronology
← Previous; Fantastica Mania	Next → CMLL Torneo de Parejas Increíbles

Pequeños Reyes del Aire chronology
← Previous; 2010	Next → 2012 Mexico City

CMLL held their annual Pequeños Reyes del Aire tournament on February 6, 2011 although they promoted the fact that the winner would get a shot at the CMLL World Mini-Estrella Championship than the tournament aspects of it. The 10 man torneo cibernetico saw the tecnicos ("good guys") team of Astral, Eléctrico, Fantasy, Mascarita Dorada and Mini Maximo faced off against the rudos ("bad guys") team of Mercurio, Pequeño Nitro, Pequeño Olimpico, Pequeño Violencia and Pierrothito. In the end Pequeño Olimpico pinned Mascarita Dorada to become the official challenger for Bam Bam's championship. The following week Pequeño Olimpico defeated Bam Bam to win the title.

Pequeños Reyes del Aire (2011) order of elimination

Order	Wrestler	Eliminated by
1	Mini Maximo	Mercurio
2	Pequeño Nitro	Fantasy
3	Astral	Pierrothito
4	Fantasy	Pequeño Violencia
5	Mercurio	Eléctrico
6	Pequeño Violencia	Mascarita Dorada
7	Electrico	Pierrothito (double pin)
8	Pierrothito	Eléctrico (double pin)
9	Mascarita Dorada	Pequeño Olímpico
10	Pequeño Olímpico	Winner

== Pequeños Reyes del Aire (2012) ==
Pequeños Reyes del Aire (2012)
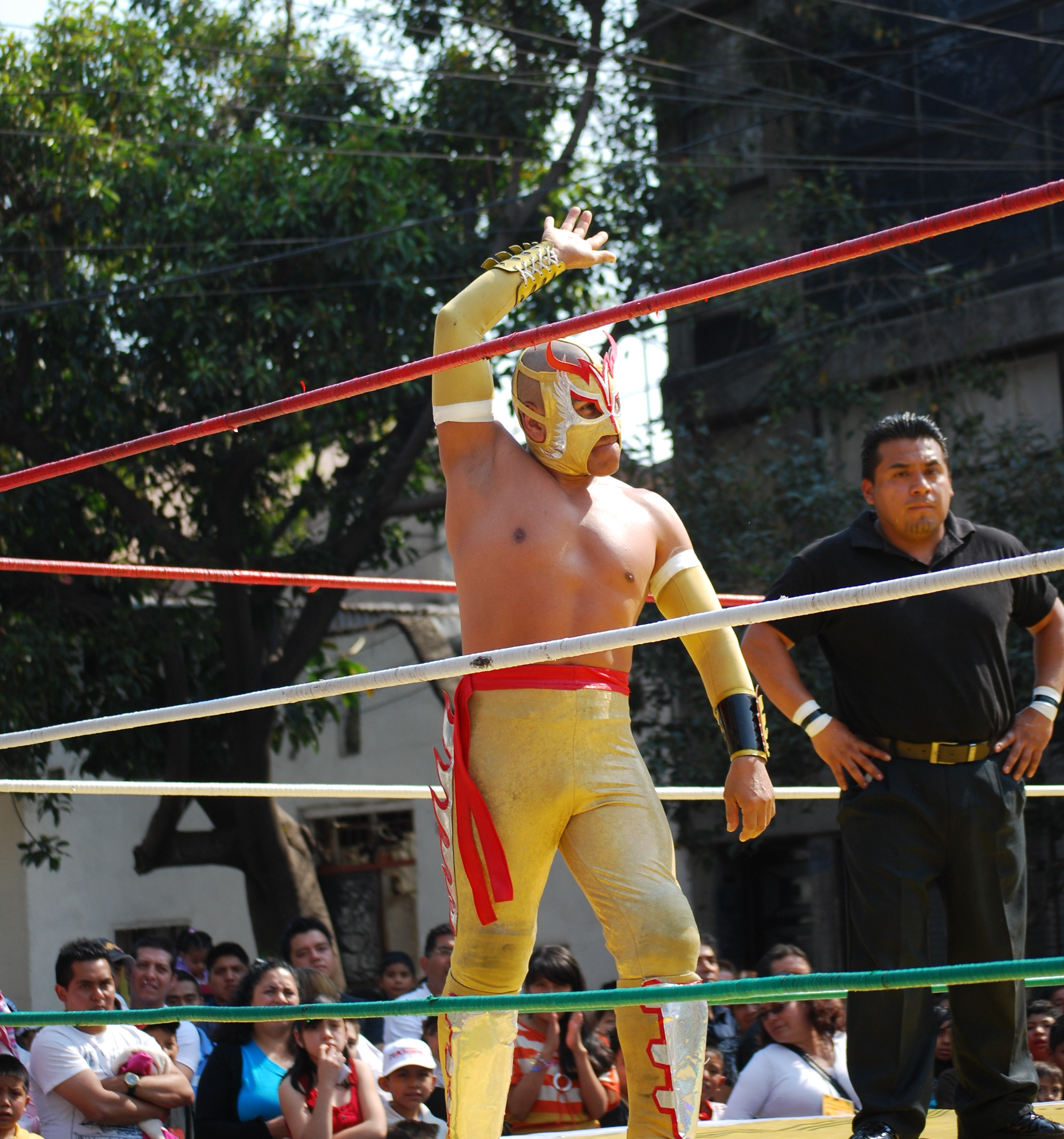
- Último Dragoncito, tournament winner
- Promotion: Consejo Mundial de Lucha Libre
- Date: May 1, 2012
- City: Mexico City, Mexico
- Venue: Arena Mexico

Event chronology
← Previous; 56. Aniversario de Arena México	Next → Infierno en el Ring

Pequeños Reyes del Aire chronology
← Previous; 2011	Next → 2012 Guadalajara

The Pequeños Reyes del Aire tournament returned in 2012 with the fifth version of the tournament, this time with 16 competitors, the largest number of wrestlers ever. The tournament took place on May 1, 2012 and was back in Arena Mexico. For the torneo cibernetico the competitors were split into two teams as Astral, Bam Bam, Mercurio, Niño de Acero, Pequeño Halcón, Pequeño Violencia, Pequeño Black Warrior and Último Dragóncito teamed up and faced the team of Aéreo, Demus 3:16, Eléctrico, Fantasy, Pequeño Nitro, Pequeño Olímpico, Pequeño Universo 2000 and Pierrothito. The final three wrestlers was Mexican National Lightweight Champion Pierrothito, CMLL World Mini-Estrella Champion Pierrothito working together against Último Dragóncito. Dragóncito overcame the odds to eliminate both and take the 2012 Pequeños Reyes del Aire tournament.

Pequeños Reyes del Aire (2012) order of elimination

Order	Wrestler	Eliminated by
1	Niño de Acero	Pequeño Universo 2000
2	Aéreo	Pequeño Halcón
3	Pequeño Universo 2000	Mercurio
4	Pequeño Halcón	Fantasy
5	Mercurio	Pequeño Nitro
6	Pequeño Nitro	Bam Bam
7	Pequeño Black Warrior	Demus 3:16
8	Fantasy	Pequeño Violencia
9	Pequeño Violencia	Eléctrico
10	Astral	Demus 3:16 (double pin)
10	Demus 3:16	Astral (double pin)
12	Eléctrico	Bam Bam
13	Bam Bam	Pequeño Olímpico
14	Pequeño Olímpico	Último Dragóncito
15	Pierrothito	Último Dragóncito
16	Último Dragóncito	Winner

== Pequeños Reyes del Aire 2012 (Guadalajara) ==
Pequeños Reyes del Aire (2012 Guadalajara)
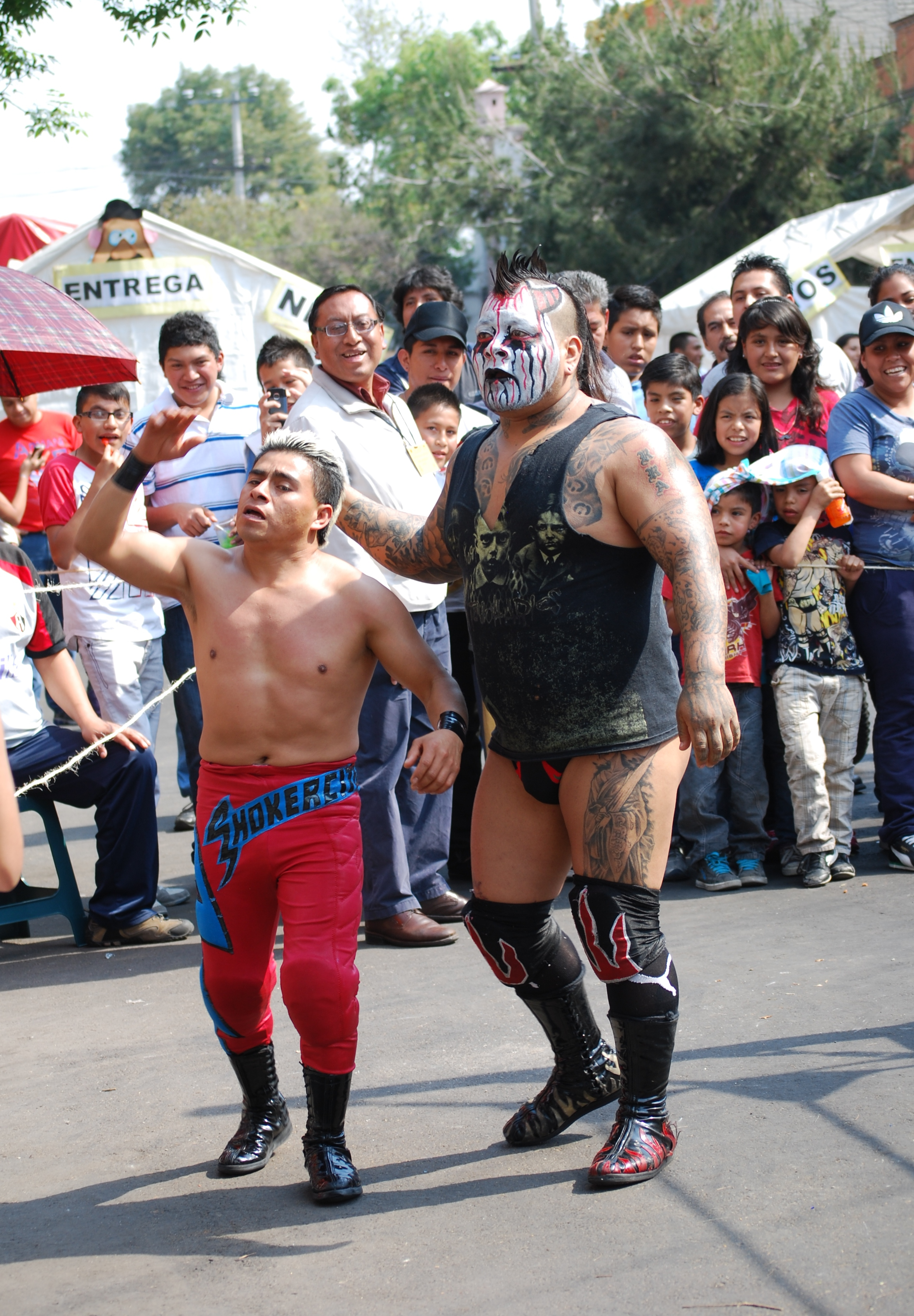
- Demus 3:16 and Shockercito, participants in the Guadalajara version of the tournament.
- Promotion: Consejo Mundial de Lucha Libre
- Date: May 1, 2012
- City: Guadalajara, Jalisco, Mexico
- Venue: Arena Coliseo, Guadalajara

Event chronology
← Previous; Reyes del Aire	Next → Mini-Estrella Infierno en el Ring

Pequeños Reyes del Aire chronology
← Previous; 2012 Mexico City	Next → 2013

CMLL held a second Pequeños Reyes del Aire in 2012, this time in Arena Coliseo in Guadalajara, Jalisco, Mexico on October 30, 2012. The tournament format was the traditional torneo cibernetico where the tecnico team of Aereo, Astral, Fantasy, Pequeño Halcón, Shockercito and Último Dragóncito faced off against the rudo team of Demus 3:16, Mercurio, Pequeño Black Warrior, Pequeño Olímpico, Pequeño Violencia and Pierrothito. During the match Shockercito hurt himself on a dive. Pequeño Black Warrior won the match to become the first man to ever win two Pequeños Reyes del Aire tournaments. The 12 Mini-Estrellas involved in the tournament would face off again a week later inside a steel cage match, contested under Luchas de Apuestas ("Bet match") where everyone will risk either their mask or their hair.

Pequeños Reyes del Aire 2012 (Guadalajara) order of elimination

Order	Wrestler	Eliminated by
1	Aereo	Mercurio
2	Pequeño Halcón	Pequeño Olímpico
3	Mercurio	Fantasy
4	Pequeño Olímpico	Astral
5	Fantasy	Demus 3:16,
6	Pequeño Violencia	Último Dragóncito
7	Astral	Pierrothito
8	Demus 3:16,	Shockercito
9	Pierrothito	Shockercito
10	Shockercito	Pequeño Black Warrior
11	Último Dragóncito	Pequeño Black Warrior
12	Pequeño Black Warrior	Winner

== Pequeños Reyes del Aire (2013) ==
Pequeños Reyes del Aire (2013)
- Promotion: Consejo Mundial de Lucha Libre
- Date: January 6, 2013
- City: Mexico City, Mexico
- Venue: Arena Mexico

Event chronology
← Previous; Sin Piedad (2012)	Next → Fantastica Mania 2013

Pequeños Reyes del Aire chronology
← Previous; Pequeños Reyes del Aire (2012 Guadalajara)	Next → Pequeños Reyes del Aire (2014)

CMLL held the 2013 version of the Pequeños Reyes del Aire tournament on January 6, 2013, once again in Arena Mexico in Mexico City, Mexico. The tournament featured 12 wrestlers in total: Acero, Aéreo, Bam Bam, Fantasy, Mercurio, Pequeño Black Warrior, Pequeño Halcón, Pequeño Nitro, Pequeño Olímpico, Pequeño Universo 2000, Pequeño Violencia, Shockercito. Pequeño Nitro was taken to the hospital to be examined for a potential shoulder injury. In the end Aéreo eliminated the then reigning CMLL World Mini-Estrella Champion Pequeño Olímpico to win the tournament, his first major CMLL accomplishment.

Pequeños Reyes del Aire (2013) order of elimination

Order	Wrestler	Eliminated by
1	Pequeño Halcón	
2	Pequeño Universo 2000	
3	Acero	
4	Shockercito	
5	Pequeño Nitro	
6	Pequeño Black Warrior	
7	Fantasy	
8	Mercurio	
9	Pequeño Violencia	
10	Bam Bam	Pequeño Olímpico
11	Pequeño Olímpico	Aéreo
12	Aéreo	Winner

== Pequeños Reyes del Aire (2014) ==
Pequeños Reyes del Aire (2014)
- Poster for the "3 Kings Days" show with the Pequeños Reyes del Aire tournament
- Promotion: Consejo Mundial de Lucha Libre
- Date: January 5, 2014
- City: Mexico City, Mexico
- Venue: Arena Mexico

Event chronology
← Previous; La Copa Junior	Next → Fantastica Mania

Pequeños Reyes del Aire chronology
← Previous; 2013	Next → 2015

CMLL held the 2014 version of the Pequeños Reyes del Aire tournament on January 5, 2014, in Arena Mexico in Mexico City, Mexico. The ninth annual tournament featured a total of 10 Mini-Estrellas: Astral, Demus 3:16, Eléctrico, Mercurio, Pequeño Nitro, Pequeño Olímpico, Pierrothito, Shockercito, Stukita and Último Dragóncito. The match came down to Astral and Eléctrico, both on the same team during the early portions of the match. In end Eléctrico landed badly on a dive to the outside onto Astral and hurt both himself and Astral. When Astral was unable to compete he was counted out and Eléctrico was declared the winner. The impact from the dive was so severe that both Astral and Eléctrico ended up having to go to the hospital after the match.

Pequeños Reyes del Aire (2014) order of elimination

Order	Wrestler	Eliminated by
1	Stukita	Pequeño Olímpico
2	Mercurio	Shockercito
3	Pequeño Nitro	Último Dragóncito
4	Shockercito	Pierrothito
5	Pequeño Olímpico	Último Dragóncito (Double pin)
5	Último Dragóncito	Pequeño Olímpico (Double Pin)
7	Demus 3:16	Astral
8	Pierrothito	Eléctrico
9	Astral	Count out
10	Eléctrico	Winner

== Pequeños Reyes del Aire (2015) ==
Pequeños Reyes del Aire (2015)
- Official poster for the January 6, 2015 show
- Promotion: Consejo Mundial de Lucha Libre
- Date: January 6, 2015
- City: Mexico City, Mexico
- Venue: Arena Mexico

Event chronology
← Previous; Infierno en el Ring	Next → Fantastica Mania

Pequeños Reyes del Aire chronology
← Previous; 2014	Next → —

The 2015 Pequeños Reyes del Aire (Spanish for "Little Kings of the Air") tournament was the tenth version of an annual professional wrestling tournament held by Mexican lucha libre promotion Consejo Mundial de Lucha Libre (CMLL) that started in 2007. The tournament is exclusively for competitors in CMLL's Mini-Estrellas division and is their version of the regular division's Reyes del Aire tournament and has the same multi-man torneo cibernetico elimination format. The 2015 version of the tournament saw five tecnicos (wrestling term for the "good guys") face off against five rudos (the "bad guys") wrestling until only one man remains in the ring. The tecnico team of Astral, Eléctrico, Fantasy, Shockercito and Último Dragoncito took on the rudo team of Demus 3:16, Mercurio, Pequeño Nitro, Pequeño Olímpico and Pierrothito. In the end Shockercito pinned Pierrothito to win the 2015 Pequeños Reyes del Aire tournament, the first tournament win of Shockercito's career.

Pequeños Reyes del Aire (2015) order of elimination

Order	Wrestler	Eliminated by
1	Fantasy	Demus 3:16
2	Pequeño Olímpico	Último Dragoncito
3	Pequeño Nitro	
4	Último Dragoncito	
5	Demus 3:16	Astral
6	Eléctrico	Astral
7	Astral	Unable to continue wrestling
8	Mercurio	Shockercito
9	Pierrothito	Shockercito
10	Shockercito	Winner
