= Sin Salida (2013) =

Mexican professional wrestling supercard show

- Official poster of the event
- Promotion: Consejo Mundial de Lucha Libre
- Date: Sunday June 22, 2013
- City: Mexico City, Mexico
- Venue: Arena México

Pay-per-view chronology
← Previous; En Busca de un Ídolo	Next → Infierno en el Ring

Sin Salida chronology
← Previous; 2010	Next → 2015

Sin Salida (Spanish for "No Exit" / "No Escape") was a professional wrestling major event produced by Consejo Mundial de Lucha Libre (CMLL) that took place on June 2, 2013, in Arena México, Mexico City, Mexico. The main event featured a 10-man Steel cage match contested under Lucha de Apuestas, or "Bet match" rules where the loser would be forced to either unmask or, if he was already unmasked, have all his hair shaved off. This particular match included 10 Mini-Estrellass with 4 of them risking their mask (Aereo, Eléctrico, Fantasy and Pequeño Nitro) and six risking their hair (Bam Bam, Demus 3:16, Mercurio, Pequeño Black Warrior, Pequeño Violencia and Shockercito). The final moments of the match saw Shockercito pin Pequeño Violencia to win the match. The other featured match of the show saw Negro Casas defend the NWA World Historic Welterweight Championship against Máscara Dorada. The show also included three additional matches.

== Production ==
=== Background ===
The Mexican wrestling company Consejo Mundial de Lucha Libre (Spanish for "World Wrestling Council"; CMLL) has held a number of major shows over the years using the moniker Sin Salida ("No Exit" or "No Escape"). CMLL has intermittently held a show billed specifically as Sin Salida since 2009, primarily using the name for their "end of the year" show in December, although once they held a Sin Piedad show in August as well. All Sin Salida shows have been held in Arena México in Mexico City, Mexico which is CMLL's main venue, its "home". Traditionally CMLL holds their major events on Friday Nights, which means the Sin Salida shows replace their regularly scheduled Super Viernes show. The 2013 Sin Salida show was the third show to use the name.

=== Storylines ===
The event featured five professional wrestling matches with different wrestlers involved in pre-existing scripted feuds, plots and storylines. Wrestlers were portrayed as either heels (referred to as rudos in Mexico, those that portray the "bad guys") or faces (técnicos in Mexico, the "good guy" characters) as they followed a series of tension-building events, which culminated in a wrestling match or series of matches.

The main event 10-man match started out as an issue between Mini-Estrellas Shockercito and Pequeño Violencia in the spring of 2013, which saw Pequeño Violencia, often with the aid of other rudos such as Pierrothito or Demus 3:16 as they used underhanded tactics to target Shockercito whenever the two were on opposite sides during CMLL events. The storyline between the two seemed to be the focal point of the Mini-Estrella division until mid-May when it drew in a number of other rivalries, including re-igniting a long running rivalry between tecnico Bam Bam and Demus 3:16 as well the resurgence of the tension between Fantasy and Mercurio, a rivalry that had led to Mercurio being unmasked the previous year. On May 26 10 Mini-Estrellas faced off in a Torneo cibernetico elimination match featuring several of the Mini-Estrellas rivalries, but did not include neither the CMLL World Mini-Estrella Champion Pequeño Olímpico nor the Mexican National Lightweight Champion Pierrothito. During the match Shockercito and Pequeño Violencia ended up eliminating each other when they ended up in a position where they pinned each other at the same time. The match saw Demus 3:16 use the ropes to his advantage to pin long time rival Bam Bam. After the match the six rudos in the match attacked Bam Bam, only for the remaining five tecnicoparticipants to run back to the ring for the save. Following the torneo cibernetico match several of the competitors challenges their rivals to put their hair or mask on the line in a Lucha de Apuestas or bet match. CMLL announced the match the following day as they announced the 2013 Sin Salida event including four matches on the undercard in addition to the main event Steel cage elimination match that would include Aéreo, Bam Bam, Demus 3:16, Eléctrico, Fantasy, Mercurio, Pequeño Black Warrior, Pequeño Nitro, Pequeño Violencia and Shockercito. On May 28 five of the participants (and Pequeño Olímpico) faced off during an Arena Mexico show, with Bam Bam, Fantasy and Shockercito won the match by disqualification following Nitro pulling Fantasy's mask off during the match, followed by Mercurio fouling Shockercito during the match to really highlight the tension between the various competitors.

Negro Casas won the NWA World Historic Welterweight Championship on February 13, 2013, from La Sombra and had proceeded to defend the championship several times in the subsequent year, including a successful title defense against Máscara Dorada on April 7, 2013. In late April Dorada had another match against Casas as Dorada teamed up with Atlantis and Titán against Casas, Volador Jr. and Último Guerrero as Casas and his team cheated their way to victory. After the match Máscara Dorada made a challenge for another championship match. Casas declined the request, stating that he would not even begin to consider a championship match until Máscara Dorada proved himself worthy by beating Casas in three matches in a row. In subsequent weeks Máscara Dorada managed to defeat Negro Casas and various partners in three consecutive Six-man tag team matches, each time with Casas losing at least one of the falls. Following Casas, Averno and El Felino's loss to Máscara Dorada and his Estetas del Aire teammates Valiente and Místico Negro Casas finally agreed to defend the championship on the June 2 Sin Salida show.

The third match on the five match show combined a long running storyline between Atlantis and Último Guerrero with a more recently developed storyline between the Mexican Rush and the Japanese, New Japan Pro-Wrestling (NJPW) wrestler Shinsuke Nakamura. The six man tag team match that would see Guerrero team up with fellow Los Guerreros del Infierno teammate Euforia and the IWGP Intercontinental Champion against Atlantis, Rush and Diamante Azul was another chapter in the build to a Luchas de Apuestas, mask vs. mask match between Atlantis and Guerrero that had already been made official months prior, allowing for the tension between the two to grow as they escalated the storyline. In early 2013 Rush, along with a number of other CMLL wrestlers, had traveled to Japan to compete in the 2013 Fantastica Mania series of shows. During the shows Rush commented that he wanted to face the best that NJPW had to offer, including Nakamura, although at the time nothing else came of it. In May Nakamura traveled to Mexico to tour with CMLL for about a month, during which both Rush and Nakamura had less than complimentary words for each other. The Sin Salida match would be the first time the two would be in the same ring together, taking their war of words into the wrestling ring.

The second match on the show was not put together based on any ongoing CMLL storylines between the two parties, instead CMLL decided to team up the tecnico team of Diamante, El Hijo del Fantasma and Tritón and match them against the rudo team of La Fievre Amarilla (Namajague and Okumura) teaming up Virus for a traditional six-man "Lucha Libre rules" tag team match. The 2013 Sin Salida show included a match between long time rivals, the experienced tecnico Metálico and El Hijo del Signo who portrays a brash, arrogant character out to prove that he is better than Metálico. The storyline began in early 2013 as they began to face off in matches on a regular basis. As the match series developed El Hijo del Signo began cheat more than once to defeat the veteran Metálico. The storyline between the two was featured a number of shows throughout March, April and including a one-on-one match on CMLL's Super Viernes show, their main weekly show and an indicator that CMLL is escalating the storyline between the two. The two were on opposite sides of a match on the Arena Coliseo 70th Anniversary Show where El Hijo del Signo got disqualified for pulling Metálico's mask off during the match, a move that is prohibited under lucha libre rules. A few weeks a later they were once again on opposite sides for the Arena Mexico 57th Anniversary Show, with El Hijo del Signo and Los Guerreros Tuareg (Arkangel de la Muerte and Skándalo) defeating Metálico, Sensei and Soberano Jr.

== Results ==
No.	Results	Stipulations
1	Metálico and Starman defeated Disturbio and El Hijo del Signo	Best two-out-of-three falls tag team match
2	Diamante, El Hijo del Fantasma and Tritón defeated La Fievre Amarilla (Namajague and Okumura) and Virus	Best two-out-of-three falls six-man "Lucha Libre rules" tag team match
3	Shinsuke Nakamura and Los Guerreros del Infierno (Euforia and Último Guerrero) defeated Atlantis, Diamante Azul and Rush	Best two-out-of-three falls six-man "Lucha Libre rules" tag team match
4	Máscara Dorada defeated Negro Casas (c)	Best two-out-of three falls match for the NWA World Historic Welterweight Championship
5	Shockercito defeated Pequeño Violencia; Also in the match: Pequeño Violencia and Shockercito lost to Aéreo, Bam Bam, Demus 3:16, Eléctrico, Fantasy, Mercurio, Pequeño Black Warrior and Pequeño Nitro	Steel cage elimination match Lucha de Apuestas
(c) / – the champion(s) heading into the match

=== Order of escape ===
Order	Escapee
1	Pequeño Black Warrior
2	Fantasy
3	Pequeño Nitro
4	Eléctrico
5	Demus 3:16
6	Aéreo
7	Mercurio
8	Bam Bam
N/A	Shockercito
N/A	Pequeño Violencia
