= Pequeño Halcón =

Mexican professional wrestler

Personal information
- Born: Rogelio Espinoza López Torreón, Coahuila, Mexico

Professional wrestling career
- Ring name(s): Caballero Halcón Jr. Halcón; Pequeño Halcón
- Trained by: Ultimo Guerrero
- Debut: 2006/2007

Rogelio Espinoza López is a Mexican professional wrestler, better known under the ring name Pequeño Halcón, sometimes referred to as simply Halcón. He is best known for working for the Mexican promotion Consejo Mundial de Lucha Libre (CMLL) in their Mini-Estrella division. Working in the Mini-Estrellas division does not necessarily mean that Pequeño Halcón is a dwarf as several wrestlers who are just shorter in stature work in the "Mini" division. His ring name is Spanish for "Little Falcon", the same name that his father competed under during his professional wrestling career. Halcón worked under mask until April 2014, when he lost a match and forced to unmask and reveal his identity as a result.

== Personal life ==
Halcón is a third-generation professional wrestler, his grandfather Juan José Espinoza Meza wrestled under the ring name "Halcón Suriano" ("Falcon Suriano") until his death in 1993. His father and two of his uncles are or were also professional wrestlers, his father worked under the name Pequeño Halcón ("Little Falcon") and his uncles as Caballero Halcón ("Falcon Knight") and Príncipe Halcón ("Falcon Prince") There is no family relations to José Luis Melchor Ortiz who was best known as Halcón, Halcón Ortiz and Super Halcón nor to Ortiz' son Super Halcón Jr.

== Professional wrestling career ==
In professional wrestling in Mexico, as part of the wrestling style called lucha libre, it is traditional to keep the true identify of a masked wrestler a secret, not revealing their real names and often not revealing what previous ring names they have competed under. Pequeño Halcón made his in-ring debut under the ring name Caballero Halcon, Jr., taking the name of his uncle Caballero Halcón as he tried originally did not work as a Mini-Estrella and thus would not make sense to work as "Pequeño Halcón, Jr." after his father. Like his father he fell into a category where at times he competed as a regular sized competitor and at other times as a Mini-Estrella due to his short stature.

=== Pequeño Halcón (2010–2014) ===
Pequeño Halcón joined CMLL in mid-2010 at the same time as the company introduced fellow Mini-Estrellas Cisne and Aéreo, although Cisne only made a few appearances for the promotion. In CMLL he is established as a Mini-Estrella as CMLL does not allow their workers to mix. As Pequeño Halcón he adopted ring gear that resembled that worn by his father, including spiked shoulder pads he wears for his introductions. His CMLL debut match took place on July 20, 2010, and saw him team up with Mini Maximo and Último Dragóncito to defeat Cisne, Pequeño Nitro and Pequeño Violencia. As part of CMLL's bicentennial celebrations, celebrating the 200th anniversary of Mexico's independence CMLL held two Torneo Bicentenario tournament one of which was for the Mini-Estrellas division. The winner of the tournament would be "promoted" to compete in the regular division going forward. The tournament took place over three Sundays in August, from August 10 to August 24. To qualify for the finale on August 24 a wrestler had to win an eight-man Torneo cibernetico to outlast his competitors. Pequeño Halcón competed in the second block of the tournament, but was the second person eliminated in the match. Halcón was one of 16 Mini-Estrellas to compete in a Ruleta de la Muerte, ("Roulette of Death"). In a Ruleta de la Muerte tournament tag teams face off in a single elimination tournament, but unlike traditional tournaments it is the losing team that advances in this case. The team that loses the tag team match final must immediately wrestle against each other in a Lucha de Apuestas match, where either their mask or their hair is on the line. Pequeño Halcón teamed up with Mini Maxmio in the fight to keep their mask or hair (in Mini Maximo's case) safe. In the first round they defeated the team of CMLL World Mini-Estrella Champion Pequeño Olímpico and Shockercito, protecting their mask and hair. He entered the Mexico City version of the 2012 Pequeños Reyes del Aire ("Little Kings of the Air") tournament, but was eliminated early on in the 16-man torneo cibernetico match. On November 6, 2012, 12 competitors met in a special steel cage match where the loser of the match would be forced to unmask or have his hair shaved completely off. Pequeño Halcón was the first wrestler to climb over the top of the cage to the floor, thus keeping his mask safe. On April 6, 2014, at Arena Coliseo's 71st anniversary event, Halcón took part in a ten-man minis cage Lucha de Apuestas. In the end, Halcón was defeated by Astral, forcing him to unmask and reveal his identity. He wrestled two more matches for CMLL over the next 2 weeks, before leacing the company for the independent scene.

== Luchas de Apuestas record ==
| Winner (wager) | Loser (wager) | Location | Event | Date | Notes |
|---|---|---|---|---|---|
| Astral (mask) | Pequeño Halcón (mask) | Mexico City | 71. Aniversario de Arena Coliseo | April 6, 2014 | (Note: This was a ten-way steel cage match, also involving Acero, Eléctrico, Fantasy, Pequeño Nitro, Pequeño Olímpico, Pierrothito, Stukita and Último Dragoncito.) |
