= Pequeño Volador Jr. =

Mexican professional wrestler (born 1995)

Personal information
- Born: August 30, 1995 (age 30) Coatzacoalcos, Veracruz, Mexico

Professional wrestling career
- Ring name(s): Angelito; Pequeño Volador Jr.
- Billed height: 1.55 m (5 ft 1 in)
- Billed weight: 55 kg (121 lb)
- Trained by: Hijo del Gladiador; Guerrero Ninja; Franco Colombo
- Debut: 2014

Pequeño Volador Jr. (born August 30, 1995), formerly known as Angelito (Spanish for Little Angel), is a Mexican professional wrestler currently working for the promotion Consejo Mundial de Lucha Libre (CMLL), where he is the current CMLL World Mini-Estrellas Champion, in his first reign. Angelito works in CMLL's Mini-Estrella division, which does not necessarily mean that he is a dwarf as several wrestlers who are just shorter in stature work in the "Mini" division. His real name is not a matter of public record while masked, as is often the case with masked wrestlers in Mexico where their private lives are kept a secret from the wrestling fans.

== Career ==
On March 29, 2024, at Homenaje a Dos Leyendas 2024, Angelito competed in the Mask Quadrangular match, where he defeated Pequeño Olímpico, which forced the latter to unmask and revealed his real name.

On the September 26, 2025 edition of Super Viernes, Angelito defeated Último Dragoncito to win the CMLL World Mini-Estrellas Championship.

On the June 9, 2026 edition of CMLL Martes Populares, Angelito's partners in El Pequeño Sky Team - Kaligua and Pequeño Magia - turned on him after losing trios match to Los Pequeños Depredadores of Mercurio, Minos I & Minos II, causing the Depredadores to save him from the assault and Angelito to leave with them, thus turning to the rudo side. The following week, the quartet defeated Angelito's former teammates, Galaxy & Shockercito. Two days after that, on the June 18 episode of CMLL Informa, Volador Jr. officially invited Angelito to join his overarching Los Depredadores faction, and bequeathed him the new persona of Pequeño Volador Jr.

== Championships and accomplishments ==
- Consejo Mundial de Lucha Libre
  - CMLL World Mini-Estrellas Championship (1 time, current)

== Luchas de Apuestas record ==
| Winner (wager) | Loser (wager) | Location | Event | Date | Notes |
|---|---|---|---|---|---|
| Angelito (mask) | Pequeño Olímpico (mask) | Mexico City | Homenaje a Dos Leyendas | March 29, 2024 | (Note: Final two of a four-way elimination match also involving Pierrothito and Acero.) |
