= List of CMLL Mini-Estrellas tournaments =

Mini-Estrellas tournaments held by Consejo Mundial de Lucha Libre

The Mexican professional wrestling promotion Consejo Mundial de Lucha Libre (CMLL) has held a number of tournaments for their Mini-Estrella division since it was founded in 1992, some recurring and others a one-off tournament held for a special event. Being professional wrestling tournaments, it they are not won legitimately; they are instead won via predetermined outcomes to the matches that is kept secret from the general public. The Mini-Estrella division has been featured in a Ruleta de la Muerte (Spanish for "Roulette of Death") tournament. A Ruleta de la Muerte tournament is a tournament in which tag teams face off in a single elimination tournament, but unlike traditional tournaments it is the losing team that advances in the tournament. The team that loses the tag team match final must immediately wrestle against each other in a Lucha de Apuestas match, where either their mask or their hair is on the line. In 2010 CMLL held a Mini-Estrella focused Torneo Bicentenario, celebrating the 200th anniversary of Mexico's independence, a tournament where the winning Mini-Estrella would be "Promoted" to the regular sized male division and compete on equal footing in CMLL. The movement from Mini-Estrella to "Regular" competitor is rare in Lucha Libre, but not without precedent as CMLL themselves held such a match in 1997, but this marked the first time a Mini-Estrella was openly promoted to the regular division without changing their ring persona or moving to a different wrestling promotion.

== 1997 Torneo Cibernetico ==
In late 1997 CMLL held an eight-man Torneo cibernetico elimination match where the winner would earn the right to work in the "regular sized" division instead of the Mini-Estrella division. This move was possible due to the fact that not all wrestlers competing in the Mini-Estrellas division have dwarfism, as is the case with Midget wrestling practiced outside Mexico. Originally the Mini-Estrella division had a height limit of 1.53 m (5 ft 0 in), although wrestlers such as Pequeño Olímpico work the Minis division despite being 1.69 m (5 ft 6 1/2 in) tall. The match included most of CMLL's Mini-Estrellas division, a division that was not very active nor very visible on CMLL shows and included Damiancito El Guerrero (who held the CMLL World Mini-Estrella Championship at the time), Cicloncito Ramírez, Tritoncito, Pequeño Cochisse, Platita, Guerrerito del Future, Pequeño Sayama and Fierito. Damiancito del Guerrero was the last competitor in the ring, earning the right to move into the regular division. At 1.65 m (5 ft 5 in), above the Mini-Estrella height limit, CMLL felt that the talented wrestler had more value in the regular division than the highly inactive Mini-Estrellas division.

In early 1998 Damiancito el Guerrero made his debut as part of the regular sized division under the name "Virus", no mention was made that Virus used to work as Damiancito El Guerrero or the fact that he still held the CMLL World Mini-Estrella Championship. By 1999 CMLL decided that it was time to crown a new CMLL World Mini-Estrella Champion as Virus was still technically the champion despite not having worked as a mini for over a year. Instead of making Virus return to the Minis division to lose the title CMLL decided to give the championship to Ultimo Dragoncito and then subsequently announce that Ultimo Dragoncito had "won" the title on an undisclosed day in October, 1999. Virus has worked in CMLL's regular division ever since and even won championships like the CMLL World Super Lightweight Championship.

== Torneo de Parejas Increibles ==
Torneo de Parejas Increibles
- Official poster for the show, advertising the Torneo de Parejas Increibles
- Promotion: Consejo Mundial de Lucha Libre
- Date: August 21, 2011
- City: Mexico City, Mexico
- Venue: Arena Mexico

Event chronology
← Previous; Leyenda de Azul (2011)	Next → CMLL Universal Championship (2011)

The CMLL Mini-Estrella division has only been involved in one Ruleta de la Muerte (Spanish for "Roulette of Death") tournament since its official creation in 1992. The Ruleta de la Muerte tournament format is based on the Lucha Libre Parejas Increibles match type where two wrestlers of opposite allegiance, portraying either villains, referred to as "Rudos" in Lucha Libre wrestling terminology or fan favorites, or "tecnicos". At times the team members will be part of a pre-existing scripted feuds or storylines with each other. In a Ruleta de la Muerte tournament tag teams face off in a single elimination tournament, but unlike traditional tournaments it is the losing team that advances in this case. The team that loses the tag team match final must immediately wrestle against each other in a Lucha de Apuestas match, where either their mask or their hair is on the line.

The tournament was a one-night tournament held on August 21, 2011, in Arena México, CMLL's main venue, and featured 16 Mini-Estrellas teaming up for the tournament for the first time. The tournament was part of CMLL's weekly Domingos Arena Mexico show, promoted as a celebration of the Mini-Estrella division's 19th anniversary, and spanned 9 matches in total including the final one on one match. To determine the team match-ups in the tournament a representative of each team entered a Battle royal where the order of elimination determined when the team would wrestle in the first round – the first two wrestlers eliminated would face off, then the next two and the next two, with the final two men in the ring facing off in the last of the opening round matches. The final two participants in the Battle Royal were Universito 2000 and Fantasy, who would compete in the last of the first round matches with their respective partners. Of the eight teams only two pairings featured an ongoing scripted feud or storyline, focusing on the developing feud between Aéreo and Pequeño Nitro and the long running rivalry between recently deposed CMLL World Mini-Estrellas Champion Bam Bam and the reigning Mexican National Lightweight Champion Pierrothito that had been going on for several years. After four first round matches and two semi-finals the rivals Bam Bam and Pierrothito faced the team of Astral and Pequeño Violencia. While their opponents were on opposite sides of the Tecnico/Rudo divide the team was able to put their differences aside to prevent them having to put their mask (Astral) and their hair (Pequeño Violencia) as they defeated Bam Bam and Pierrothito, taking advantage of the friction between the longtime rivals. Bam Bam was forced to wager his hair and Pierrothito had to wager his mask in the Lucha de Apuestas match that followed immediately after their tag team loss. As is traditional in lucha libre the match was contested under best two-out-of-three falls between the two wrestlers. The two quickly split the first two falls between them, leaving the score tied for a third and final fall, which lasted much longer than the first two falls. In the third fall Pierrothito was able to defeat Bam Bam and celebrated in the ring while Bam Bam had all his hair shaved off as a result of the loss.

Tournament Participants
Key

Symbol	Meaning
(T)	This wrestler is a Tecnico
(R)	This wrestler is a Rudo

- Aéreo (T) and Pequeño Nitro (R)
- Astral (T) and Pequeño Violencia (R)
- Bam Bam (T) and Pierrothito (R)
- Eléctrico (T) and Mercurio (R)
- Fantasy (T) and Pequeño Black Warrior (R)
- Mini Maximo (T) and Pequeño Halcón (R)
- Shockercito (T) and Pequeño Olímpico (R)
- Último Dragóncito (T) and Universito 2000 (R)

Tournament brackets

Quarterfinals
1	Pequeño Halcón and Mini Maximo	W
8	Shockercito and Pequeño Olímpico
4	Bam Bam and Pierrothito
5	Pequeño Nitro and Aéreo	W
2	Pequeño Violencia and Astral
7	Eléctrico and Mercurio	W
3	Pequeño Black Warrior and Fantasy
6	Último Dragóncito and Universito 2000	W

Semifinals
Shockercito and Pequeño Olímpico	W
Bam Bam and Pierrothito
Pequeño Violencia and Astral
Pequeño Black Warrior and Fantasy	W

Finals
Bam Bam and Pierrothito
Pequeño Violencia and Astral	W

== Torneo Bicentenario ==
Torneo Bicentenario de Mini-Estrellas
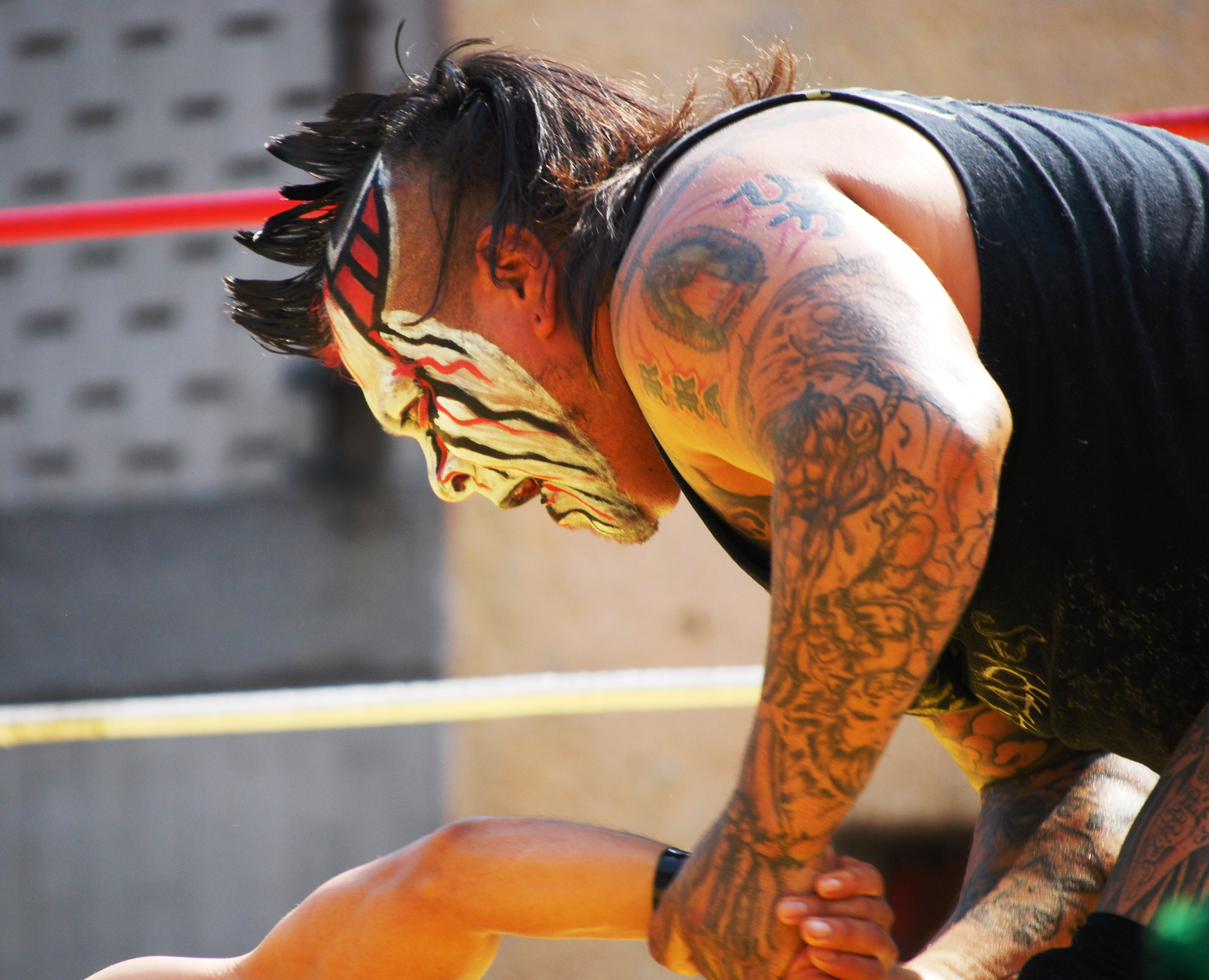
- Demus 3:16, winner of the tournament and promoted to the "Regular" division
- Promotion: Consejo Mundial de Lucha Libre
- Date: August 10, 2010 to August 24, 2010
- City: Mexico City, Mexico
- Venue: Arena Mexico

Event chronology
← Previous; Universal Championship	Next → CMLL 77th Anniversary Show

As part of CMLL's bicentennial celebrations, celebrating the 200th anniversary of Mexico's independence CMLL held two Torneo Bicentenario tournament one of which was for the Mini-Estrellas division. The winner of the tournament would be "promoted" to compete in the regular division going forward. The movement from Mini-Estrella to "Regular" competitor is rare in Lucha Libre, but not without precedent as CMLL themselves held such a match in 1997, but this marked the first time a Mini-Estrella was openly promoted to the regular division without moving to a different wrestling promotion. The winner of the match would not even be required to change their ring persona or ring name, unless the winner was working as a "Mini" version of another luchador, such as Pequeño Olímpico being a smaller version of Olímpico. A move from the Mini-Estrella division to the regular division meant that the winner would work more matches since a CMLL show has five "regular" division matches on a show and did not always feature the Mini-Estrellas division. The tournament took place over three Sundays in August, from August 10 to August 24. To qualify for the finale on August 24 a wrestler would have to win an eight-man Torneo cibernetico to outlast his competitors.

August 10 Torneo Cibernetico

The first cibernetico match took place on August 10 and saw Demus 3:16 outlast Cisne, Fantasy, Pequeño Olímpico, Pequeño Violencia, Saturno, Pequeño Nitro and finally Eléctrico to earn his spot in the final.

Order of elimination

Order	Wrestler	Eliminated by
1	Cisne	
2	Fantasy	
3	Pequeño Olímpico	
4	Pequeño Violencia	
5	Saturno	
6	Pequeño Nitro	Electrico
7	Eléctrico	Demus 3:16
8	Demus 3:16	Winner

August 17 Cibernetico Torneo

The second Torneo Cibernetico match took place a week later and saw Pierrothito as the winner of the match when he outlasted Aéreo, Pequeño Halcón, Universito 2000, Astral, Último Dragóncito, Pequeño Black Warrior and Bam Bam. Pierrothito's victory was seen as a bit of a surprise, first and foremost because he was a Rudo just like Demus 3:16, but also because Demus and Bam Bam, the last man eliminated by Pierrothito, was a longtime rival and had frequently talked about wanting to move up a division in various interviews.

order of elimination

Order	Wrestler	Eliminated by
1	Aéreo	
2	Pequeño Halcón	
3	Pequeño Universo 2000	
4	Astral	
5	Último Dragóncito	
6	Pequeño Black Warrior	Bam Bam
7	Bam Bam	Pierrothito
8	Pierrothito	Winner

August 24 Tournament final

The final was hend under Best two out of three falls rules as is tradition with most Lucha Libre matches in CMLL and saw the reigning Mexican National Lightweight Champion Pierrothito face off against Demus 3:16. The two quickly took one fall each, leaving them tied with a third and deciding fall needed. In the end Demus 3:16 gained the third fall to win the overall Torneo Bicentenario.

Aftermath

Following his victory Demus 3:16 made his debut in the regular division where he became part of the Los Cancerberos del Infierno ("the Infernal Cerberos") under the leadership of Virus, who was also the last Mini-Estrella to "move up" in CMLL. The two former Mini-Estrellas quickly began a rivalry between them over control of Los Cancerberos. That led to a match on March 11, 2011, against Virus with the stipulation of the loser being both shaved bald and also had to return to the Mini-Estrella division to compete. Virus cemented his status as the leader of Los Cancerberos as he defeated Demus 3:16 and sent him back to the Mini-Estrella division.

== Mini-Estrella Infierno en el Ring 2012 ==
Infierno en el Ring (2012)
- Poster for the 12 Mini-Estrellas cage match
- Promotion: Consejo Mundial de Lucha Libre
- Date: November 6, 2012
- City: Mexico City, Mexico
- Venue: Arena Mexico

Event chronology
← Previous; Pequeños Reyes del Aire	Next → La Copa Junior

CMLL held a steel cage match involving 12 Mini-Estrellas, the rules dictated that the last two men in the cage would have immediately to face off in a Luchas de Apuestas ("Bet match") with the loser either having to unmask or have his hair shaved off as a result. The match took place on November 6, 2012, in Arena Coliseo in Guadalajara, Jalisco and included Aéreo, Astral, Demus 3:16, Fantasy, Mercurio, Pequeño Black Warrior, Pequeño Halcón, Pequeño Olímpico, Pequeño Violencia, Pierrothito, Shockercito and Último Dragoncito. The wrestlers were not allowed to even attempt to leave the cage until three minutes into the ring, but once the deadline was up Pequeño Halcón was the first person out of the cage followed by Mercurio and Aéreo. Moments later, as Pequeño Olímpico was trying to climb over the top part of the wire mesh on the cage gave out and Pequeño Olímpico ended up with his arm trapped in the cage, needing help to get loose and to the floor where he was checked to see if he needed medical attention. After that Fantasy climbed over the cage the floor, escaping the match and joining Mercurio and Aéreo, who were still on the floor. Moments later Astral climbed to the top of the cage and dove off the 15-foot-high cage, landing a Moonsault on Mercurio, Aéreo and Fantasy who were still on the floor. During the move Astral got caught in the cage and landed in an uncontrolled manner on the floor, hitting his head, which promoted the medical personnel to immediately rush him out of the arena. The bad fall also hurt Mercurio, who had to be removed from the ring on a stretcher. Many of the remaining contestants, including Pierrothito bled during the match, some was possibly intentional as part of the plan for the match while others were not intentionally bleeding. Demus 3:16 was the recipient of several throws and falls off the cage as he tried to escape, finally shaking off his opponents to climb out. Once Demus 3:16 was on the floor he needed help to even stand and had to be helped from the arena. The last person to escape was Pequeño Violencia, whose back was bleeding from being thrown against the cage repeatedly. With Pequeño Violencia out it left Shockercito and Pequeño Black Warrior as the last two men in the ring, with both of them risking their hair on the outcome of this part of the match. Shockercito finally managed to defeat his opponent when he applied the La Reienera submission hold on Pequeño Black Warrior, forcing him to submit. Following the loss Pequeño Black Warrior had all his hair shaved off. Following the match Shockercito stated that he hoped his victory would earn him a match against one of the Mini-Estrella champions.

Order of elimination

Order	Escapee
1	Pequeño Halcón
2	Mercurio
3	Aéreo
4	Pequeño Olímpico
5	Fantasy
6	Astral
7	Pierrothito
8	Último Dragoncito
9	Demus 3:16
10	Pequeño Violencia

== See also ==
- List of CMLL singles wrestling tournaments
- List of CMLL tag team tournaments
