= Pequeño Black Warrior =

Mexican professional wrestler

Personal information
- Born: November 15, 1970 (age 55) Mexico City, Mexico

Professional wrestling career
- Ring name(s): Cats; Mini Psicosis; Pequeño Black Warrior
- Billed height: 1.65 m (5 ft 5 in)
- Billed weight: 70 kg (154 lb)
- Billed from: Mexico City, Mexico
- Trained by: Saprian Petrov; Chico Hernàndez; Gran Cochisse; Arturo Beristain; Panchito Villalobos
- Debut: December 1, 1995

Humberto Sánchez Medorio is a Mexican professional wrestler, better known by his ring name Pequeño Black Warrior, or Pequeño Warrior. Sánchez previously worked for the Mexican promotion Consejo Mundial de Lucha Libre (CMLL) in their Mini-Estrella division as a smaller version of wrestler Black Warrior, and for Asistencia Asesoría y Administración (AAA) as Mini Psicosis, a smaller version of the wrestler Psicosis. Working in the Mini division does not necessarily mean that Sánchez has dwarfism as several short wrestlers work in the "Mini" division, which is what separates the Mexican Mini-Estrella from traditional Midget wrestling as practiced in the United States and other places.

== Professional wrestling career ==
Sánchez trained for his professional wrestling career under Saprian Petrov, Panchito Villalobos, and Chico Hernàndez before making his wrestling debut on December 1, 1995. Later he received further training from Gran Cochisse and Arturo Beristain at the Guadalajara, Jalisco wrestling school.

=== Asistencia Asesoría y Administración (1995–2007) ===
Sánchez made his debut for Asistencia Asesoría y Administración (AAA) on December 1, 1995, under the ring name "Mini Psicosis", a smaller version of luchador Psicosis, who was a very successful rudo (villain) in AAA at the time. Like the regular sized wrestler the Mini Psicosis character was also booked as a rudo. In 1997 the original Psicosis was replaced by a new Psicosis as the original worked full-time for World Championship Wrestling (WCW). When the new Psicosis joined Cibernético's recently formed Los Vipers group Mini Psicosis joined as well, teaming up with other Minis such as Mini Abismo Negro to form Los Mini Vipers, a group Sánchez would be associated with for the rest of his AAA career. Mini Psicosis made his first major show appearance at the 1998 Rey de Reyes event, teaming with Mini Abismo Negro and Mini Electroshock to defeat La Parkita, Mini Discovery, and Octagoncito. In the late 1990s and early 2000s the Mini-Division was not featured prominently in AAA, which meant that Mini Psicosis' next significant wrestling appearance was at the 2000 Rey de Reyes event. This time Mini Psicosis, Mini Abismo Negro, and Rocky Marvin lost to La Parkita, Octagoncito and Mascarita Sagrada 2000. in 2001 Mini Psicosis briefly held the Lucha Libre Latina (LLL) Mini-Estrella Championship but generally worked more in the middle of the Mini-Estrella division than the top. Over the years Mini Psicosis developed a long running feud with Octagoncito, one that saw the two face off several times in six-man tag matches and finally culminated in a Lucha de Apuesta match where both men put their mask on the line. The match was the semi-main event of the 2005 Rey de Reyes event and saw Octagoncito defeat his longtime rival, forcing Mini Psicosis to be unmasked after the match. In August Octagoncito would defeat Mini Psicosis in yet another Lucha de Apuesta, this time shaving Mini Psicosis bald after the match per Lucha Libre traditions. The now bald Mini Psicosis teamed up with Mini Abismo Negro and Jerrito Estrada in a loss to the team of Mascarita Sagrada, Octagoncito and Rocky Marvin on the undercard of the 2005 Verano de Escandalo show. In December 2005 Mini Psicosis, Mini Abismo Negro, and Jerrito Estrada defeated Octagoncito, Mascarita Sagrada, and Mascarita Sagrada Jr. at AAA's annual Guerra de Titanes show. This turned out to be the last time Mini Psicosis would appear at a major AAA event. During mid-2007 Sánchez decided to leave AAA after working for the company for almost 12 years. AAA replaced Sánchez's Mini Psicosis with a new masked Mini Psicosis character played by Enrique Del Rio, who had previously worked as Jerrito Estrada.

=== Consejo Mundial de Lucha Libre (2007–2014) ===
After leaving AAA Sánchez signed a contract with Consejo Mundial de Lucha Libre (CMLL) to work in CMLL's Mini-Estrella division. He was given the ring name Pequeño Black Warrior ("Little Black Warrior"), a smaller version of CMLL regular Black Warrior. While the original Black Warrior had been unmasked some years prior Pequeño Black Warrior was initially masked. While he was patterned after Black Warrior the two never teamed up, CMLL generally keep their mini-division and the regular sized wrestlers separate. On August 29, 2008, Pequeño Black Warrior finally made his first major show appearance when he teamed with Pequeño Damián 666 and Pierrothito to defeat Fantasy, Mascarita Dorada and Pequeño Olímpico in the opening match of CMLL's Sin Piedad show. The following month he participated in a tournament to crown a new Mexican National Lightweight Champion, a title that up until that point had been for regular sized wrestlers but from late 2008 and onward was exclusively for Mini-Estrellas. Pequeño Black Warrior participated in a Torneo cibernetico on September 16, 2009, but was eliminated by eventual winner Mascarita Dorada.

On January 6, 2009, Pequeño Black Warrior outlasted Bam Bam, Nino de Acero, Mascarita Dorada, Mr. Águilita, Pequeño Damián 666, Pequeno Halloween, Pequeno Ninja, Pequeño Violencia, and Ultimo Dragoncito in a 10-Minis Torneo cibernetico called Pequeño Reyes del Aire ("Little Kings of the Air"), an annual tournament that features CMLL's Mini-Estrella division. Pequeño Black Warrior was one of 13 Mini-Estrellas to put their mask on the line in a Lucha de Apuesta Steel Cage, called a Infierno en el Ring match by CMLL. Pequeño Black Warrior was the ninth overall wrestle to escape the cage to keep his mask safe. In the end Pierrothito pinned Shockercito to unmask him.Arturo Rosas Plata (January 12, 2009). "La tarde se Pintó de azul". Ovaciones (in Spanish). Mexico, D.F.: Editorial Ovaciones, S. A. de C.V. p. 26. Número 21465 Año LXII. Archived from the original on August 13, 2009. Less than two months later, on March 6, Pequeño Black Warrior was involved in the second ever "All-Minis" Infierno en el Ring match, risking his mask against 13 other Mini-Estrellas. Pequeño Black Warrior escaped the cage and looked on as Mascarita Dorada unmasked Sombrita. At CMLL 76th Anniversary Show Pequeño Black Warrior teamed up with Pierrothito and Pequeño Damián 666, losing to Bam Bam, Eléctrico. and Pequeño Olímpico in two straight falls.

Pequeño Black Warrior started out 2010 on a high note by winning an eight-Mini Torneo Cibernetico on the January 22, 2010, Super Viernes show. In the weeks following his Torneo Cibernetico win he began targeting Bracito de Oro, ripping his mask up during or after matches. At times the mask ripping even lead to his team being disqualified for the blatant disregard of the rules. Pequeño Black Warrior later challenged Bracito de Oro to a Lucha de Apuesta match at some point in the future. He also went on to state that his ambition for 2010 was to defeat Bam Bam for the CMLL World Mini-Estrella Championship and win his hair as well, a challenge that has been dismissed by Bam Bam so far, telling Pequeño Black Warrior that he had not earned it yet. On March 7, 2010 Pequeño Black Warrior participated in the 2010 version of Pequeño Reyes del Aire but was not able to win again, as Pequeño Nitro won the 2010 trophy. After the feud had been building lasted for over three months Pequeño Black Warrior defeated Bracito de Oro in a Lucha de Apuestas match as part of the April 30, 2010, Super Viernes show. Following the match Bracito de Oro unmasked and revealed his real name to the audience. On December 3, 2010, at Sin Piedad 2010 Eléctrico defeated Pequeño Warrior in a Lucha de Apuesta, forcing Sánchez to unmask himself for the second time in his career. On September 18, 2011, Pequeño Warrior lost a Hair vs. Hair match against Demus 3:16 and was as a result forced to have his hair shaved off. On October 30, 2012, he won the 2012 Pequeños Reyes del Aire (Guadalajara) tournament, becoming the first man to win two Pequeños Reyes del Aire tournament. The following week, on November 6, 2012, all 12 competitors from the Pequeño Reyes del Aire tournament met in a special steel cage match where the loser of the match would be forced to unmask or have his hair shaved completely off. The match was very chaotic, the steel cage broke at one time and saw several wrestlers bleed and others need medical attention due to a number of accidents. Pequeño Black Warrior and Shockercito were the last two wrestlers left in the ring, relatively unscathed because they had stayed away from the cage as much as possible. In the end Shockercito forced Pequeño Black Warrior to submit, ensuring that he had to be shaved bald after the match.

== Personal life ==
Humbert Sánchez is the father of Perla Gabriela Sánchez, Joanna Guadalupe Sánchez, and Humberto Sánchez. Joanna and Humberto Live in the United States Washington With Her Mother and Humbert First Wife Estela Vazquez Solorzano. Perla Gabriella suffers from severe cerebral palsy caused by medical negligence during her birth and has been treated for the condition at the Children's Rehabilitation Center of Tlalnepantla for seven years, reducing her convulsions. Sánchez has stated that he would like to represent all the special needs children through his ring character, hoping to bring an understanding to other people that they are children just like all other children. As a result of his daughters condition Sánchez often visits children's wards wearing his mask to visit with the sick children.

== Championships and accomplishments ==
- Asistencia Asesoría y Administración
  - LLL Mini-Estrellas Championship (1 time)
- Consejo Mundial de Lucha Libre
  - Pequeño Reyes del Aire (2009, 2012 Guadalajara)

== Luchas de Apuestas record ==
| Winner (wager) | Loser (wager) | Location | Event | Date | Notes |
|---|---|---|---|---|---|
| Mini Psicosis (hair) | Mini Kabuki (hair) | León, Guanajuato | Live event | October 16, 2000 | (Note: The hair of each wrestlers cornerman was on the line, Mini Psicosis had El Tirantes in his corner while Mini Kabuki had Bobby Lee in his.) |
| Octagóncito (mask) | Mini Psicosis (mask) | Ciudad Madero, Tamaulipas | Rey de Reyes | March 11, 2005 | |
| Octagóncito (mask) | Mini Psicosis (hair) | Cuernavaca, Morelos | AAA Live event | August 20, 2005 | |
| Pequeño Black Warrior (mask) | Bracito de Oro (mask) | Mexico City | Homenaje a Dos Leyendas | April 30, 2010 | |
| Eléctrico (mask) | Pequeño Warrior (mask) | Mexico City | Sin Piedad | December 3, 2010 | |
| Demus 3:16 (hair) | Pequeño Warrior (hair) | Mexico City | CMLL show | September 18, 2011 | |
| Shockercito (hair) | Pequeño Black Warrior (hair) | Mexico City | CMLL show | November 6, 2012 | (Note: Steel Cage match that also included Aéreo, Astral, Demus 3:16, Fantasy, Mercurio, Pequeño Halcón, Pequeño Olímpico, Pequeño Violencia, Pierrothito and Último Dragoncito.) |
| Asturiano (mask) | Pequeño Black Warrior (hair) | Puebla, Puebla | CMLL show | June 30, 2014 | |
