= Pequeño Universo 2000 =

Mexican professional wrestler

Personal information
- Born: 1978 (age 47–48) State of Mexico, Mexico

Professional wrestling career
- Ring name(s): Pequeño Universo 2000; Universito 2000
- Billed height: 1.65 m (5 ft 5 in)
- Billed weight: 74 kg (163 lb)
- Trained by: Pirata Morgan; Hombre Bala; Villano I Genaro Contreas
- Debut: 2000; 2007 (as Pequeño Universo 2000)

Pequeño Universo 2000, sometimes also referred to as Universito 2000, is a Mexican professional wrestler. He is best known for working for the Mexican promotion Consejo Mundial de Lucha Libre (CMLL) in their Mini-Estrella division, which does not necessarily mean that he is a dwarf as several wrestlers who are just shorter in stature work in the "Mini" division. Pequeño Universo 2000's real name is not a matter of public record, as is often the case with masked wrestlers in Mexico where their private lives are kept a secret from the professional wrestling fans. His name means "Little Universo 2000" and his ring character is based on Universo 2000, a regular sized professional wrestler, whom he leases the rights to the name from.

== Professional wrestling career ==
In Mexico, it is traditional to keep the true identify of a masked professional wrestler a secret, not revealing their real names and often not revealing what previous ring names they have competed under. No previous ring identities have been confirmed for Pequeño Universo 2000, but it has been stated that he made his professional debut in 2000 and did not adopt the Pequeño Universo 2000 mask and ring persona until around 2007, which means he worked under other names before this, possibly even working for Consejo Mundial de Lucha Libre (CMLL) as one or several other masked or unmasked Mini-Estrella characters. He adopted the "Pequeño Universo 2000" ring character in 2006, working wearing the same wrestling outfit, including the mask of Universo 2000, playing off the character and the success of the original Universo 2000. It is not uncommon in Lucha Libre to pay for the use of someone else's ring character or gimmick, either as a Mini version or as a "Junior" version of the original, normally when their own career is in its later years.

=== Consejo Mundial de Lucha Libre (2008–2020) ===
Pequeño Universo 2000 started working for the Mexican promotion Consejo Mundial de Lucha Libre (CMLL) in the summer of 2008, which was after Universo 2000 stopped working regularly for that same company, as a rudo (Spanish term for a person portraying a bad guy character in wrestling). The first recorded match of his CMLL career took place on April 27, 2008, where he teamed up with Pierrothito to defeat Atomo and Shockercito in a Tag Team match. In September 2008 CMLL decided to add another championship to their Mini-Estrellas division when they made the Mexican National Lightweight Championship Mini-Estrellas exclusive. Pequeño Universo 2000 was placed in the first group of wrestlers hoping to qualify for the tournament final, but was eliminated in the Torneo cibernetico elimination match that took place on September 9, 2009. The Mini-Estrella division was featured in its first pay-per-view main event at CMLL's La Hora Cero ("Zero Hour") as 14 Mini-Estrellas all put their masks on the line in a steel cage match where the last two people in the ring would have to wrestle under Lucha de Apuesta (bet match) rules inside the steel cage. Whoever lost the match would be forced to unmask per Lucha Libre traditions. Pequeño Universo 2000 managed to climb out of the cage as the eight overall escapee, ensuring that he did not have to risk his mask at the end of the match. On August 14, 2009, Pequeño Universo 2000 was once again part of a multi-man steel cage match, this time the Mini-Estrellas competed with regular sized competitors in the match. Pequeño Universito 2000 escape the cage early on, keeping his mask safe once again. On March 7, 2010, Pequeño Universo 2000 competed in the 2010 Pequeños Reyes del Aire ("Little Kings of the Air") tournament alongside Bam Bam, Electrico, Pequeño Damián 666, Pequeño Olímpico, Pequeño Nitro, Pequeño Violencia, Pequeño Black Warrior, Shockercito, and Último Dragóncito in a Torneo cibernetico, a multi man elimination tournament. CMLL decided not to book Pequeño Universo 2000 as the tournament winner, instead he was eliminated early in the match. As part of CMLL's bicentennial celebrations, celebrating the 200th anniversary of Mexico's independence CMLL held a Torneo Bicentenario where the winner of the tournament would be "promoted" to compete in the regular division going forward. The second of the cibernetico matches took place on August 17 and saw Pierrothito outlast Pequeño Universo 2000, as well as Aéreo, Astral, Bam Bam, Pequeño Halcón, Pequeño Black Warrior, and Último Dragóncito. On August 21, 2011, CMLL held a Ruleta de la Muerte (Spanish for "Roulette of Death") tournament for the Mini-Estrellas division and include Pequeño Nitro as one of the participants. The Ruleta de la Muerte tournament format is based on the Lucha Libre Parejas Increibles match type where two wrestlers of opposite allegiance, have to team up. In a Ruleta de la Muerte tournament tag teams face off in a single elimination tournament, but unlike traditional tournaments it is the losing team that advances in this case. The team that loses the tag team match final must immediately wrestle against each other in a Lucha de Apuestas match, where either their mask or their hair is on the line. Pequeño Universo 2000 teamed up with Último Dragóncito to defeat the team of Fantasy and Pequeño Black Warrior and thus did not have to risk their masks later in the tournament. On May 1, 2012, Pequeño Universo 2000 was one of 16 Mini-Estrellas to participate in the 2012 version of the Pequeños Reyes del Aire tournament as one of 16 competitors but CMLL decided not to have him win the tournament. His last known match anywhere took place on February 7, 2020, after which he seemingly retired.
