= Acero =

Mexican professional wrestler

Personal information
- Born: August 4, 1984 (age 42) Ciudad Nezahualcoyotl, State of Mexico, Mexico

Professional wrestling career
- Ring name(s): Acero; Niño de Acero
- Billed height: 1.60 m (5 ft 3 in)
- Billed weight: 60 kg (132 lb)
- Trained by: Ray Mendoza; Virus; El Hijo del Gladiador
- Debut: 2008

Acero (born August 4, 1984) is a Mexican professional wrestler working for promotion Consejo Mundial de Lucha Libre (CMLL) in their Mini-Estrella division. Working in the Mini-Estrellas division does not necessarily mean that Acero is a dwarf as several wrestlers who are just shorter in stature work in the "Mini" division. Acero is Spanish for "Steel" and is a shortened version of his previous ring name Niño de Acero or "Boy of Steel". Acero's real name is not a matter of public record, as is often the case with masked wrestlers in Mexico where their private lives are kept a secret from the wrestling fans.

== Personal life ==
Acero is a third-generation professional wrestler, his grandfather worked under the ring name Canario Amarillo ("Yellow Canary") and his father wrestled under the name Destello Azul ("Blue Spark") and his brother is currently active as a professional wrestler as well, using the name El Juez ("The Judge"), none of whom worked in the Mini-Estrella division. Despite both his father and grandfather being professional wrestlers Acero did not receive any significant training from his family, instead listing Ray Mendoza as one of his teachers as well as Consejo Mundial de Lucha Libre (CMLL) trainer El Hijo del Gladiador and CMLL wrestler Virus as the people who trained him both before and after his professional wrestling debut.

== Professional wrestling career ==
In lucha libre mexicana it is traditional to keep the true identity of a masked wrestler a secret, not revealing their real names and often not revealing what previous ring names they have competed under. No previous ring identities have been confirmed for Acero and it has been stated that his CMLL debut was also his professional debut, but with the traditions of Lucha Libre it is entirely possible that his debut date is for that of his ring character, not him personally, which means could have worked under other names before this.

=== Niño de Acero (2008–2012) ===
He made his debut for Consejo Mundial de Lucha Libre in the summer of 2008 under the ring name "Niño de Acero", Spanish for "Boy of Steel", the nickname of the Comic book hero Superboy. In September 2008 CMLL decided to add another championship to their Mini-Estrellas division when they made the Mexican National Lightweight Championship Mini-Estrellas exclusive. Niño de Acero was placed in the first group of wrestlers hoping to qualify for the tournament final, but was eliminated in the Torneo cibernetico elimination match that took place on September 9, 2009. He competed in the 2009 Pequeños Reyes del Aire ("Little Kings of the Air") tournament, where he was the third man eliminated out of nine competitors in total. The Mini-Estrella division was featured in its first ever pay-per-view main event at CMLL's La Hora Cero ("Zero Hour") as 14 Mini-Estrellas all put their masks on the line in a Steel cage match where the last two people in the ring would have to wrestle under Lucha de Apuesta (bet match) rules inside the steel cage. Whoever lost the match would be forced to unmask per Lucha Libre traditions. Niño de Acero managed to climb out of the cage as the fifth overall escapee, ensuring that he did not have to risk his mask at the end of the match.

During a match in Arena Puebla on February 23, 2009, suffered a debilitating injury as he fractured his femur during a move executed by Pierrothito. The injury kept Niño de Acero out of the ring for three years, first as the fractured femur healed, then as he went through over a year of physical therapy and rehabilitation to be medically cleared to wrestle again. He returned to active competition on March 4, 2012, teaming with rudos (wrestlers who portray the "bad guy" characters) Mercurio and Pequeño Olímpico despite working as a tecnico ("good guy") before his injury. Two months later he returned to working on the tecnico side with no explanation given. On May 1, 2012, Niño de Acero was one of 16 Mini-Estrellas who participated in the 2012 version of the Pequeños Reyes del Aire tournament, but CMLL decided not to have him win the tournament.

=== Acero (2012–present) ===
Niño de Acero shorted his name to simply "Acero" ("Steel") and first worked under that name on the September 28, 2012 Super Viernes show where he teamed up with Fantasy and Shockercito as the team defeated Mercurio, Pequeño Black Warrior, and Pequeño Violencia.
