= Aéreo =

Mexican professional wrestler

Personal information
- Born: Víctor Gonzalo Barragán Hernández; November 9, 1989 (age 36) Mexico City, Mexico

Professional wrestling career
- Ring name: Aéreo
- Billed height: 1.59 m (5 ft 3 in)
- Billed weight: 59 kg (130 lb)
- Trained by: Virus; Fuerza Aerea; Piratita Morgan
- Debut: 2010

Víctor Gonzalo Barragán Hernández is a Mexican professional wrestler. He is working for the Mexican professional wrestling promotion Consejo Mundial de Lucha Libre (CMLL) in their Mini-Estrella division. Working in the Mini-Estrellas division does not necessarily mean that Aéreo is a dwarf as several wrestlers who are just shorter in stature work in the "Mini" division. Barragán works under the ring name Aéreo, Spanish for "Air".

== Professional wrestling career ==
In lucha libre it is traditional to keep the true identify of a masked wrestler a secret, not revealing their real names and often not revealing what previous ring names they have competed under. No previous ring identities have been confirmed for Barragán, but it has been stated that he made his professional debut 2005 and did not adopt the Aéreo mask and ring persona until 2010, which means he worked under other names before this, possibly even working for Consejo Mundial de Lucha Libre (CMLL) as one or several other masked or unmasked Mini-Estrella characters.

=== Aéreo (2010–present) ===
Aéreo joined CMLL in mid-2010 at the same time as the company introduced fellow Mini-Estrellas Cisne and Pequeño Halcón, although Cisne only made a few appearances for the promotion. In his debut Aéreo teamed up with Pequeño Halcón and Último Dragóncito, losing to Cisne, Pequeño Violencia and Pequeño Black Warrior. Aéreo was masked during a press conference to introduce him but worked unmasked in his debut match. As part of CMLL's bicentennial celebrations, celebrating the 200th anniversary of Mexico's independence CMLL held Torneo Bicentenario tournaments, one of which was for the Mini-Estrellas division. The winner of the tournament would be "promoted" to compete in the regular division going forward. Aéreo competed in the second Torneo cibernetico, where he was the first wrestler eliminated. Following the tournament Aéreo did not appear for CMLL until early 2011; on his return he wore the mask he had worn during his introduction. Aéreo was one of 16 Mini-Estrellas to compete in a Ruleta de la Muerte, ("Roulette of Death"). In a Ruleta de la Muerte tournament tag teams face off in a single elimination tournament, but unlike traditional tournaments it is the losing team that advances in this case. The team that loses the tag team match final must immediately wrestle against each other in a Lucha de Apuestas match, where either their mask or their hair is on the line. Aéreo teamed up with Pequeño Nitro and defeated Pierrothito and Bam Bam in the first match, keeping their masks safe. On May 5, 2012, CMLL held the fifth annual Pequeños Reyes del Aire ("Little Kings of the Air") tournament, which saw 18 Mini-Estrellas compete for the victory. Aéreo was eliminated second.

CMLL decided to book Aéreo in one of the focal storylines of the Mini-Estrellas division as he began a feud with against Pequeño Nitro. The storyline started in Best two out of three falls Six-man tag team matches where the two would focus more on each other than the other men in the ring. As the storyline escalated the two would tear at each other's masks, at times winning by pulling the mask off the other one to gain an unfair advantage. In July 2012, it was announced that the storyline would culminate in a Luchas de Apuestas ("Bet Match") on July 15, a match where both competitors put their mask on the line. Pequeño Nitro won the match and thus Aéreo was forced to unmask per Lucha Libre tradition. On November 6, 12 competitors met in a special steel cage match where the loser of the match would be forced to unmask or have his hair shaved completely off. Aéreo was the third person to escape the cage, which meant his hair was not going to be shaved off. On January 6, 2013, Aéreo won the 2013 Pequeños Reyes del Aire tournament when he outlasted Bam Bam, Pequeño Violencia, Mercurio, Fantasy, Pequeño Black Warrior, Pequeño Nitro, Shockercito, Acero, Pequeño Universo 2000, Pequeño Halcón and the CMLL World Mini-Estrellas Champion Pequeño Olímpico. After a short storyline feud between Aéreo and Pequeño Violencia both competitors agreed to put their hair on the line in a Lucha de Apuestas on August 9, 2015. In the end, Aéreo pinned his opponent, forcing Pequeño Violencia to be shaved bald after the match as stipulated by the Lucha de Apuestas rules. In 2017, Aéreo competed in a torneo cibrenetico elimination match, booked by CMLL to establish the next challenger for the CMLL World Mini-Estrellas Championship. Aéreo was eliminated about halfway through the match, which was eventually won by Pierrothito.

== Championships and accomplishments ==
- Consejo Mundial de Lucha Libre
  - Pequeño Reyes del Aire (2013)

== Luchas de Apuestas record ==
Winner (wager)	Loser (wager)	Location	Event	Date	Notes
Pequeño Nitro (mask)	Aéreo (mask)	Mexico City	CMLL Guerreros del Ring	July 15, 2012	
Aéreo (hair)	Pequeño Violencia (hair)	Mexico City	CMLL Domingo Familiar	August 9, 2015	
