= Pequeño Nitro =

Mexican professional wrestler (1984–2024)

Personal information
- Born: March 9, 1984 Toluca, State of Mexico, Mexico
- Died: May 3, 2024 (aged 40)

Professional wrestling career
- Ring name: Pequeño Nitro
- Billed height: 1.60 m (5 ft 3 in)
- Billed weight: 64 kg (141 lb)
- Trained by: El Hijo del Gladiador; El Satánico; Franco Columbo
- Debut: 2005
- Retired: 2023

Pequeño Nitro (March 9, 1984 – May 3, 2024) was a Mexican professional wrestler, best known for working for the Mexican promotion Consejo Mundial de Lucha Libre (CMLL) in their Mini-Estrella division. This does not necessarily mean that Pequeño Nitro is a dwarf as several wrestlers who are just shorter in stature work in the "Mini" division. Pequeño Nitro's real name is not a matter of public record, as is often the case with masked wrestlers in Mexico where their private lives are kept a secret from the wrestling fans. His name means "Little Nitro" and his ring character is based on Nitro, a regular-sized luchador.

== Professional wrestling career ==
In Mexico, it is traditional to keep the true identify of a masked professional wrestler a secret, not revealing their real names and often not revealing what previous ring names they have competed under. No previous ring identities have been confirmed for Pequeño Nitro but it has been stated that he made his professional debut in 2005 and did not adopt the Pequeño Nitro mask and ring persona until 2009, which means he worked under other names before this. The Pequeño Nitro was introduced in the summer of 2009 where he was introduced as the first (and so far only) member of Los Pequeño Guerreros Tuareg ("The Little Tuareg Warriors"), a mini version of Los Guerreros Tuareg, led by Nitro. Nitro was working as a rudo (Spanish term for a person portraying a bad guy character in professional wrestling), which mean Pequeño Nitro was a rudo as well. While being a smaller version of Nitro CMLL did not have the two associate during matches. Pequeño Nitro made his in-ring debut on July 14, 2009, teaming with Pequeño Violencia and Pequeño Black Warrior as they defeated the team of Bam Bam, Bracito de Oro and Electrico. On August 14, Pequeño Nitro was one of 14 wrestlers who risked their masks in a multi-man steel cage match where the last two people in the ring would have to wrestle under Lucha de Apuesta (bet match) rules inside the steel cage. Whoever lost the match would be forced to unmask per Lucha Libre traditions. This match saw Mini-Estrellas compete with regular sized competitors and saw Pequeño Nitro escape the cage to keep his mask safe. On March 7, 2010, Pequeño Nitro competed in the 2010 Pequeños Reyes del Aire ("Little Kings of the Air") tournament alongside Bam Bam, Electrico, Pequeño Damián 666, Pequeño Olímpico, Pequeño Universo 2000, Pequeño Violencia, Pequeño Black Warrior, Shockercito and Último Dragóncito in a Torneo cibernetico, a multi man elimination tournament. CMLL decided to book Pequeño Nitro as the 2010 tournament winner, giving him added exposure and credibility as a wrestler. The victory earned Pequeño Nitro a match for the CMLL World Mini-Estrella Championship the following week. Despite his Pequeño Reyes del Aire success Pequeño Nitro did not defeat Bam Bam.

As part of CMLL's bicentennial celebrations, celebrating the 200th anniversary of Mexico's independence CMLL held a Torneo Bicentenario where the winner of the tournament would be "promoted" to compete in the regular division going forward. The first cibernetico match took place on August 10 and saw Demus 3:16 outlast Pequeño Nitro, as well as Cisne, Pequeño Olímpico, Pequeño Violencia, Saturno, Fantasy and Eléctrico. On August 21, 2011, CMLL held a Ruleta de la Muerte (Spanish for "Roulette of Death") tournament for the Mini-Estrellas division and include Pequeño Nitro as one of the participants. The Ruleta de la Muerte tournament format is based on the Lucha Libre Parejas Increibles match type where two wrestlers of opposite allegiance, have to team up. In a Ruleta de la Muerte tournament tag teams face off in a single elimination tournament, but unlike traditional tournaments it is the losing team that advances in this case. The team that loses the tag team match final must immediately wrestle against each other in a Lucha de Apuestas match, where either their mask or their hair is on the line. Pequeño Nitro teamed up with Aéreo to defeat the team of Bam Bam and Pierrothito and thus did not have to risk their masks later in the tournament. On May 1, 2012, Pequeño Nitro was one of 16 Mini-Estrellas to participate in the 2012 version of the Pequeños Reyes del Aire tournament as one of 16 competitors but CMLL decided not to have him win the tournament again. In the months following the 2012 Pequeños Reyes del Aire tournament CMLL decided to book Pequeño Nitro in one of the focal storylines of the Mini-Estrellas division as he began a feud against Aéreo. The storyline started out in Best two out of three falls Six-man tag team matches where the two would focus more on each other than the other men in the ring. As the storyline escalated the two would tear at each other's masks, at times winning by pulling the mask off the other one to gain an unfair advantage. In July 2012 it was announced that the storyline would culminate in a Luchas de Apuestas ("Bet Match") on July 15, a match where both competitors put their mask on the line. Pequeño Nitro won the match and thus Aéreo was forced to unmask as per Lucha Libre traditions. His last CMLL match took place on February 7, 2020, and did not return after the company's Covid-19 induced hiatus, with only 2 further matches on-record from independent shows in late 2021. He retired in 2023 due to repeated ankle injuries.

== Death ==
Nitro succumbed to alcoholic depression after he was forced to retire, and became homeless. His body was discovered in Toluca on May 3, 2024, and identified by family on May 14. He was 40 years old.

== Championships and accomplishments ==
- Consejo Mundial de Lucha Libre
  - Pequeño Reyes del Aire (2010)

== Lucha de Apuesta record ==
Winner (wager)	Loser (wager)	Location	Event	Date	Notes
Pequeño Nitro (mask)	Aéreo (mask)	Mexico City	CMLL show	July 15, 2012	
