= Pequeño Violencia =

Mexican professional wrestler

Personal information
- Born: July 18, 1968 (age 58) Oaxaca, Oaxaca, Mexico

Professional wrestling career
- Ring name(s): El Fierito; Pequeño Violencia
- Billed height: 1.57 m (5 ft 2 in)
- Billed weight: 75 kg (165 lb)
- Trained by: El Cerrajero; El Hijo del Gladiador; Roy Lancer
- Debut: September 11, 1990

Pequeño Violencia (real name unrevealed; born July 18, 1968) is a Mexican professional wrestler who has worked in the Mexican Mini-Estrella division since his debut in 1990. As Pequeño Violencia he wrestles as a smaller version of professional wrestler Violencia. He previously wrestled under the ring name El Fierito, a smaller version of wrestler La Fiera. Working in the Mini division does not necessarily mean that he has dwarfism as several short wrestlers work in the "Mini" division, which is what separates the Mexican Mini-Estrella from traditional Midget wrestling as practiced in the United States and other places.

== Professional wrestling career ==
The wrestler who would later work as Pequeño Violencia was trained for his professional wrestling career by El Cerrajero and El Gladiador before making his debut on September 11, 1990. Pequeño Violencia has never revealed what ring name he used between 1990 and 1995, it is, therefore, unknown where he wrestled in the early part of his career.

=== El Fierito (1995–2003) ===
The wrestler who would later become known as Pequeño Violencia first began working for Consejo Mundial de Lucha Libre in 1995, adopting the ring name "El Fierito", a smaller version of the rudo (bad guy) La Fiera ("The Fierce"). While the regular-sized La Fiera was unmasked, El Fierito was masked, with no indication of what ring name he had used before. In late 1997 CMLL booked an eight-man elimination match where the winner would earn the right to work in the regular-sized division and move away from being billed as a Mini-Estrella. El Fierito was one of the eight participants along with Cicloncito Ramírez, Tritoncito, Pequeño Cochisse, Platita, Guerrerito del Future, Pequeño Sayama and match winner Damiancito El Guerrero. At the Entre Torre Infernal event on August 4, 2000, Fierito, Fire, and Pierrothito lost to the team of Ultimo Dragoncito, Bracito de Oro, and Cicloncito Ramirez by countout. The following year El Fierito and Pierrothito teamed up, only to lose in the opening match of the 2001 Juicio Final show.

=== Pequeño Violencia (2003–Present) ===
In the early part of the 2000s, El Fiero went into semi-retirement when he stopped working for CMLL, and since CMLL no longer employed the "regular-sized" Fiero there was no point in promoting a Mini-Estrella version, which led to Fierito being repackaged. He made his debut as "Pequeño Violencia" (Little Violencia), a smaller version of Violencia complete with Violencia's signature masked match and rudo attitude. A few months into his run as Pequeño Violencia he began a storyline feud with Pequeño Olímpico, who like Fierito had recently been repackaging from Cicloncito Ramírez. The feud saw Pequeño Violencia use various underhanded tactics to defeat Pequeño Olímpico on several occasions. The two finally met in a Lucha de Apuesta, mask vs. mask match, on April 30, 2003, in Arena Mexico, Mexico City. On the night Peuqeño Olímpico was able to overcome Pequeño Violencia's cheating ways to win the match, and the mask of Pequeño Violencia. When Pequeño Olímpico won the CMLL World Mini-Estrella Championship on December 9, 2003 Pequeño Violencia was one of the first challengers to the title, but like in their Apuesta match Pequeño Olímpico won when it mattered.

Pequeño Violencia teamed up with Espectrito and Fire, losing to the team of Mascarita Sagrada, Shockercito and Tzuki in the opening match of the CMLL 71st Anniversary Show. He was also involved in the following year's anniversary show, the CMLL 72nd Anniversary Show where he teamed up with Pierrothito and Sombrita but once again lost, this time defeated by Bam Bam, Último Dragoncito and longtime rival Pequeño Olímpico. The following year Pequeño Violencia became involved in a feud against CMLL's rising Mini-Estrella star Bam Bam, a match that led to a Lucha de Apuesta, hair vs. hair match, between the two. On July 16, 2007, Bam Bam was victorious, which meant that Pequeño Violencia had to have all his hair shaved off for the first time in his professional wrestling career. Over the following years, Pequeño Violencia played more of a supporting role as other, younger Mini-Estrellas were the focus of the division. Pequeño Violencia made his next appearance at a major show on March 20, 2009, at the 2009 Homenaje a Dos Leyendas show. He teamed up with Pierrothito and Pequeño Black Warrior, losing their match against Pequeño Olímpico, Shockercito and Último Dragoncito. In early 2010 Bam Bam returned from an anterior cruciate ligament and immediately began a feud with Pequeño Violencia that was featured on CMLL's Arena Puebla shows. The feud between the two resulted in the two wrestles facing off in a Lucha de Apuesta for the second time on March 15, 2010, again with Bam Bam winning the match thus forcing Pequeño Violencia to have his hair shaved off. In August CMLL began a "Bicentennial tournament" specifically for the Mini-Estrella division, both to celebrate the 200th anniversary of Mexico as a nation and the 18th anniversary of CMLL's Mini-Estrella division. The prize of the tournament was an opportunity to leave the Mini-Estrellas division and work with the regular male wrestlers of CMLL. Pequeño Violencia was part of the first of two torneo cibernetico elimination matches but did not qualify for the finals. On November 6, 2012, 12 competitors met in a special steel cage match where the loser of the match would be forced to unmask or have his hair shaved completely off. The match was very chaotic and saw several wrestlers bleed and others need medical attention due to a number of accidents; Pequeño Violencia bled profusely from his back but managed to be the last person to escape the cage, saving his mask.

==== Comando Caribeño ====
On May 9, 2013 CMLL introduced a new Comandante Pierroth, a character based on the original Pierroth. The new Comandante Pierroth was announced as the leader of a faction called La Comando Caribeño ("The Caribbean Commando") consisting of members of the original Pierroth's Los Boriquas, Pequeño Violencia, Pierrothito, and La Comandante, and added Zeuxis to the group as well. After a short storyline feud between Pequeño Violencia and Aéreo both competitors agreed to put their hair on the line in a Lucha de Apuestas on August 9, 2015. In the end Aéreo pinned his opponent, forcing Pequeño Violencia to be shaved bald after the match as stipulated by the Lucha de Apuestas rules.

== Luchas de Apuestas record ==
Winner (wager)	Loser (wager)	Location	Event	Date	Notes
Pequeño Olímpico (mask)	Pequeño Violencia (mask)	Mexico City	CMLL show	April 30, 2003	
Bam Bam (hair)	Pequeño Violencia (hair)	Mexico City	CMLL show	July 16, 2007	
Bam Bam (hair)	Pequeño Violencia (hair)	Puebla, Puebla	CMLL show	March 15, 2010	
Shockercito (hair)	Pequeño Violencia (hair)	Mexico City	Sin Salida	June 2, 2013	(Note: 10-man Steel cage elimination match that also included Aéreo, Bam Bam, Demus 3:16, Eléctrico, Fantasy, Mercurio, Pequeño Black Warrior and Pequeño Nitro)
Aéreo (hair)	Pequeño Violencia (hair)	Mexico City	CMLL show	August 9, 2015	
