= Mercurio (wrestler) =

Mexican professional wrestler

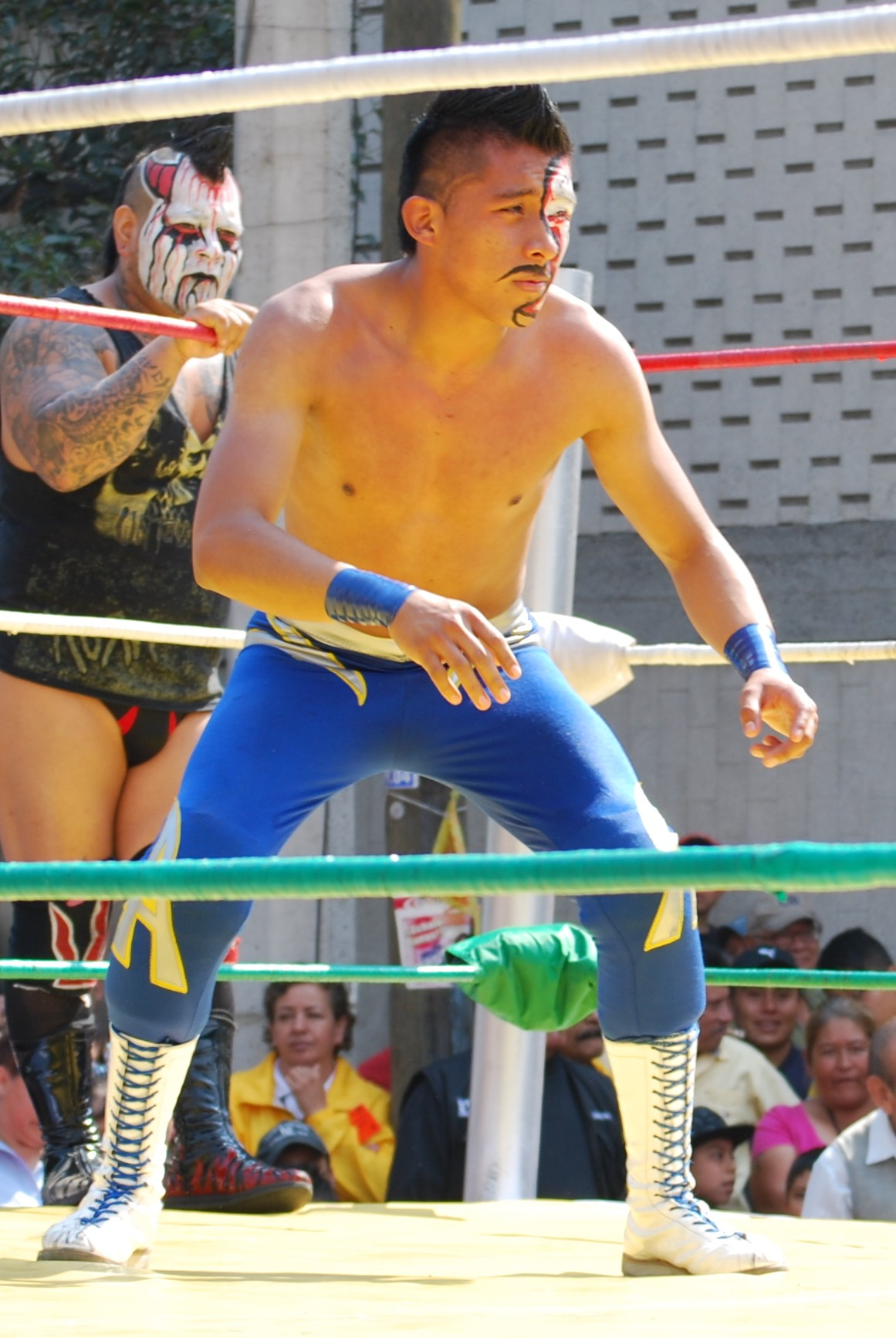
- Mercurio during a match in 2013

Personal information
- Born: Saltillo, Coahuila, Mexico

Professional wrestling career
- Ring name: Mercurio
- Billed height: 1.63 m (5 ft 4 in)
- Billed weight: 70 kg (154 lb)
- Trained by: Virus; Arturo Beristain
- Debut: 2007; 2011 (as Mercurio)

Abraham Arrieta González is a Mexican professional wrestler. He currently working for the Mexican professional wrestling promotion Consejo Mundial de Lucha Libre (CMLL) working under the ring name Mercurio (Spanish for Mercury), where he is a former CMLL World Mini-Estrella Champion. As Mercurio González works in CMLL's Mini-Estrella division, which does not necessarily mean that Mercurio is a dwarf as several wrestlers who are just shorter in stature work in the "Mini" division. Mercurio's real name was not a matter of public record while masked, as is often the case with masked wrestlers in Mexico where their private lives are kept a secret from the wrestling fans.

== Professional wrestling career ==
In Mexico, it is traditional to keep the true identify of a masked wrestler a secret, not revealing their real names and oftentimes not revealing what previous ring names they have competed under. No previous ring identities have been confirmed for Abraham Arrieta González, he has confirmed he made his professional debut around 2007 and did not adopt the Mercurio mask and ring persona until late 2010, which means he worked under other names before this, possibly even working for Consejo Mundial de Lucha Libre (CMLL) as other masked or unmasked Mini-Estrella characters. During an interview Mercurio revealed that he worked as a tecnico ("Good guy" wrestler) before adopting the Mercurio name, but did not state under what name.

=== Mercurio (2011–present) ===
The symbol of Mercury that adorned Mercurio's mask

Arrieta adopted the Mercurio ring character in late 2010, including wearing a mask with the symbol of the planet Mercury and the element Mercury. Mercurio made his character debut on December 26, 2010, working as a rudo ("Bad guy") character teaming up with Pequeño Universo 2000 and Pequeño Black Warrior and was booked to lose to the tecnico team of Aereo, Mascarita Dorada and Último Dragóncito. On August 21, 2011 CMLL held a Ruleta de la Muerte (Spanish for "Roulette of Death") tournament for the Mini-Estrellas division and include Mercurio as one of the participants. The Ruleta de la Muerte tournament format is based on the Lucha Libre Parejas Increibles match type where two wrestlers of opposite allegiance, have to team up. In a Ruleta de la Muerte tournament tag teams face off in a single elimination tournament, but unlike traditional tournaments it is the losing team that advances in this case. The team that loses the tag team match final must immediately wrestle against each other in a Lucha de Apuestas match, where either their mask or their hair is on the line. Mercurio teamed up with Eléctrico and the two won their first match against Astral and Pequeño Violencia and thus did not have to risk their masks later in the tournament. On May 1, 2012 Mercurio was one of 16 Mini-Estrellas to participate in the 2012 Pequeños Reyes del Aire ("Little Kings of the Air") tournament as one of 16 competitors but did not win the tournament.

Over the summer of 2012 CMLL decided to book Mercurio in one of the focal storylines of the Mini-Estrellas division as he began a feud against Fantasy. the storyline started out in Best two out of three falls Six-man tag team matches where the two would focus more on each other than the other men in the ring. As the storyline escalated the two would tear at each other's masks, at times winning by pulling the mask off the other one to gain an unfair advantage. In September, 2012 it was announced that the storyline would culminate in a Luchas de Apuestas ("Bet Match") on October 14, 2012, a match where both competitors put their mask on the line. On October 14 Fantasy defeated Mercurio to unmask him as per Lucha Libre traditions and reveal his real name, Abraham Arrieta González. On November 6, 2012, 12 competitors met in a special steel cage match where the loser of the match would be forced to unmask or have his hair shaved completely off. Mercurio was the second person to escape the cage, which meant his hair was not going to be shaved off. Minutes later, while Mercurio was still on the floor outside the cage Astral dove off the top, but due to the cage mesh breaking earlier in the match, Astral got caught up on the cage and landed awkwardly on Mercurio, Aéreo and Fantasy. The bad fall caused Astral to be rushed out of the arena for immediate attention and Mercurio had to be carried to the back as well due to the impact of Astral.

== Championships and accomplishments ==
- Consejo Mundial de Lucha Libre
  - CMLL World Mini-Estrella Championship (1 time)

== Luchas de Apuestas record ==
Winner (wager)	Loser (wager)	Location	Event	Date	Notes
Fantasy (mask)	Mercurio (mask)	Mexico City	CMLL show	October 14, 2012	
Mercurio (hair)	Shockercito (hair)	Mexico City	Sin Salida (2024)	January 1, 2024	
