= Fantasy (Mini-Estrella) =

Mexican professional wrestler

Personal information
- Born: 1989 (age 36–37) Mexico

Professional wrestling career
- Ring name(s): Fantasy; Fantasy Jr. Mini Fantasy
- Billed height: 1.6 m (5 ft 3 in)
- Billed weight: 68 kg (150 lb)
- Trained by: Fantasy (Original); Jose Luis Feliciano; El Hijo del Gladiador
- Debut: November 11, 2003

Fantasy is a Mexican professional wrestler working for the Mexican promotion Consejo Mundial de Lucha Libre (CMLL) in their Mini-Estrella division, which does not necessarily mean that Fantasy is a dwarf as several wrestlers who are just shorter in stature work in the "Mini" division. Fantasy's real name is not a matter of public record, as is often the case with masked wrestlers in Mexico where their private lives are kept a secret from the wrestling fans. He has also been referred to as Fantasy Jr. and Mini Fantasy to distinguish himself from his father, who wrestled under the name "Fantasy" as well.

== Professional wrestling career ==
Fantasy trained for his professional wrestling career under his father, a former Luchador himself who also used the ring name Fantasy. He made his debut on November 11, 2003 under the name "Fantasy, Jr." and did not work as a Mini-Estrella in his debut match. At the time a different wrestler was working under the name Fantasy in the Mexican professional wrestling promotion International Wrestling Revolution Group (IWRG), but changed name in 2005 to Sensei. Once the confusion over the name was cleared the Son of Fantasy began competing simply as Fantasy, or sometimes "Mini Fantasy" since he was a regular of the Mini-Estrellas division at that point. Fantasy does actually not have dwarfism and has during interviews stated his desire to bulk up a little and join the "regular" division.

=== Consejo Mundial de Lucha Libre (2004–present) ===
Fantasy joined Consejo Mundial de Lucha Libre (CMLL), the world's oldest, still existing professional wrestling promotion and started working in their Mini-Estrella division. On July 13, 2007 Fantasy was one of the participants in the inaugural Pequeños Reyes del Aire ("Little Kings of the Air") tournament. The tournament was a 9-man Torneo cibernetico elimination match to win the Pequeños Reyes del Aire trophy, Fantasy was the fourth man eliminated from the match. the following year he once again competed in the Pequeños Reyes del Aire torneo cibenetico on January 4, 2008, but this time fared worse as he was eliminated as the second person of the night. In the late summer of 2008 CMLL decided to add a second title to the Mini-Estrella division as they held a Mexican National Lightweight Championship tournament, which saw Fantasy challenge for the title along with 21 other Mini-Estrellas. Fantasy was eliminated during the preliminary round and did not make it to the final. On January 11, 2009 Fantasy was one of 13 Mini-Estrellas to put their mask on the line in a multi-man Luchas de Apuestas, "mask vs. mask" cage match where the last two wrestlers in the ring had to fight for the right to keep their mask. This was the Main Event of CMLL's La Hora Cero ("Zero Hour") Pay-per-view event, the highest profile match Fantasy had participated in up until this point. Fantasy was the third man to leave the ring, ensuring he kept his mask. On August 18, 2009 Fantasy was once again involved in a multi-man Luchas de Apuestas steel cage match, this time with Mini-Estrellas and regular sized competitors mixed together. Again Fantasy escaped the match early on, keeping his mask safe.

As part of CMLL's bicentennial celebrations, celebrating the 200th anniversary of Mexico's independence CMLL held a Torneo Bicentenario where the winner of the tournament would be "promoted" to compete in the regular division going forward. The first cibernetico match took place on August 10 and saw Demus 3:16 outlast Fantasy, as well as Cisne, Pequeño Olímpico, Pequeño Violencia, Saturno, Pequeño Nitro and Eléctrico. On August 21, 2011 CMLL held a Ruleta de la Muerte (Spanish for "Roulette of Death") tournament for the Mini-Estrellas division and include Mercurio as one of the participants. The Ruleta de la Muerte tournament format is based on the Lucha Libre Parejas Increibles match type where two wrestlers of opposite allegiance, have to team up. In a Ruleta de la Muerte tournament tag teams face off in a single elimination tournament, but unlike traditional tournaments it is the losing team that advances in this case. The team that loses the tag team match final must immediately wrestle against each other in a Lucha de Apuestas match, where either their mask or their hair is on the line. Fantasy teamed up with Pequeño Black Warrior, losing to the team of Pequeño Universo 2000 and Último Dragóncito, sending them one step closer to having to defend their mask and hair. In the second round the team defeated Astral and Pequeño Violencia and thus did not have to risk their masks later in the tournament. On May 1, 2012 Fantasy was one of 16 Mini-Estrellas to participate in the 2012 version of the Pequeños Reyes del Aire tournament as one of 16 competitors but did not win the tournament.

Over the summer of 2012 CMLL decided to book Fantasy in one of the focal storylines of the Mini-Estrellas division as he began a feud against Mercurio. the storyline started out in Best two out of three falls Six-man tag team matches where the two would focus more on each other than the other men in the ring. As the storyline escalated the two would tear at each other's masks, at times winning by pulling the mask off the other one to gain an unfair advantage. In September, 2012 it was announced that the storyline would culminate in a Luchas de Apuestas ("Bet Match") on October 14, 2012, a match where both competitors put their mask on the line. On October 14 Fantasy defeated Mercurio to unmask him as per Lucha Libre traditions. On November 6, 2012, 12 competitors met in a special steel cage match where the loser of the match would be forced to unmask or have his hair shaved completely off. Fantasy was the fifth person to escape the cage, which meant he did not have to unmask. Minutes later, while Mercurio was still on the floor outside the cage Astral dove off the top, but due to the cage mesh breaking earlier in the match, Astral got caught up on the cage and landed awkwardly on Mercurio, Aéreo and Fantasy. The bad fall caused Astral to be rushed out of the arena for immediate attention and Mercurio had to be carried to the back as well due to the impact of Astral.

== Luchas de Apuestas record ==
Winner (wager)	Loser (wager)	Location	Event	Date	Notes
Fantasy (mask)	Mercurio (mask)	Mexico City	CMLL Live event	October 14, 2012	
