= CMLL World Mini-Estrellas Championship =

Professional wrestling little persons' championship

- The front plate of the championship

Details
- Promotion: Consejo Mundial de Lucha Libre
- Date established: March 1, 1992 (Note: Duncan & Will (2000) p. 397 "Mascarita Sagrada 1992/03/01 Mexico City")
- Current champion: Pequeño Volador Jr.
- Date won: November 17, 2023
Statistics
- First champion: Mascarita Sagrada
- Most reigns: Último Dragoncito (3 reigns)
- Longest reign: Pequeño Olimpico (3 years, 346 days)
- Shortest reign: Mascarita Sagrada (100 days)
- Oldest champion: Pequeño Olímpico (37 years, 308 days)
- Youngest champion: Último Dragoncito (20 years, 219 days)
- Heaviest champion: Pequeño Damián 666 (80 kg (180 lb))
- Lightest champion: Mascarita Sagrada (42 kg (93 lb))

The CMLL World Mini-Estrellas Championship (Campeonato Mundial Mini-Estrellas de CMLL in Spanish), also known as the CMLL World Pequeño Estrellas Championship (Campeonato Mundial Pequeno Estrellas de CMLL in Spanish), is a professional wrestling championship promoted by the Mexican Lucha libre wrestling-based promotion Consejo Mundial de Lucha Libre (CMLL; Spanish for "World Wrestling Council"). The championship is exclusively competed for in the Mini-Estrellas, or Minis, division. A "Mini" is not necessarily a person with dwarfism, as in North American Midget wrestling, and can also be short wrestlers who work in the Mini-Estrellas division; although wrestlers with dwarfism can compete for the title, there also exists the CMLL World Micro-Estrellas Championship, exclusive to them. (Note: Madigan (2007), pp.209: "They invited some of the wrestlers of smaller physical stature south of the border to work.") The championship was created in 1992 and is the oldest active Mini-Estrella title in Mexico; (Note: Duncan & Will (2000) p. 397, chapter Mexico: EMLL CMLL World Midget (miniestrella) title) both the Mexican National Mini-Estrella Championship and the Lucha Libre AAA Worldwide (AAA) World Mini-Estrella Championship were introduced after CMLL created their Mini-Estrella championship. (Note: Duncan & Will (2000), chapter "Mexico: National Midget (miniestrella) title, p. 401 "") As it is a professional wrestling championship, it is not won legitimately; it is instead won via a scripted ending to a match or awarded to a wrestler because of a storyline. (Note: Hornbaker (2016) p. 550: "Professional wrestling is a sport in which match finishes are predetermined. Thus, win–loss records are not indicative of a wrestler's genuine success based on their legitimate abilities - but on now much, or how little they were pushed by promoters") Up until late 2021, all championship matches promoted in Mexico took place under best two-out-of-three falls rules. (Note: Comisión de Box y Lucha Libre p. 44 "ARTICULO 258.- Cada combate de lucha libre tendrá como limite tres caídas; cada caída será sin limite de tiempo, ganará quien obtenga dos caídas de las tres en disputa" ("ARTICLE 258.- Each wrestling match shall have as limit three falls; Each fall will be without time limit. The winner will be the one to first obtain two of the three falls in the match"))

The CMLL World Mini-Estrella Championship was created in early 1992 to give CMLL's Mini-Estrellas division a championship as its focal point. The first champion was Mascarita Sagrada, who won a four-man tournament on March 1, 1992, by defeating Espectrito in the final. When the creator of CMLL's Minis division, Antonio Peña, left CMLL to form his own promotion, AAA, Mascarita Sagrada and many other Minis left CMLL to join AAA. (Note: Duncan & Will (2000) p. 397 "Vacant on 92/06/19 after Sagrada justs to AAA in 92/05") After Mascarita Sagrada left the promotion, the title was vacant until September 1992, when Orito won the championship in a match against El Felinito. (Note: Duncan & Will (2000) p. 397 "Orito 1992/09/06 Mexico City") In 1999, in a so-called "Phantom title switch", then-champion Damiancito el Guerrero had the championship stripped and given to Último Dragoncito without a match taking place. Damiancito had begun working under the ring name "Virus" in the "regular-sized" division for more than a year and thus no longer qualified as a Mini. Instead of vacating the title or making Virus lose it in a match, CMLL announced that Último Dragoncito had "won" the title on an undisclosed date in October 1999. (Note: Duncan & Will (2000) p. 397 "Ultimo Dragoncito 1997/10#")

In addition to being the first champion, Mascarita Sagrada is also the first wrestler to have vacated the title; he is also the wrestler to have held the title the shortest amount of time, at 110 days. Pequeño Volador Jr. is the current champion in his first reign. He defeated Último Dragoncito on September 26, 2025, at Super Viernes. Pequeño Olímpico has held the title the longest of any champion, at 1,442 days for a single reign and 2,744 for his combined two reigns.

== 1992 CMLL World Mini-Estrella tournament ==
CMLL held a tournament in early 1992 to determine the first CMLL World Mini-Estrella Champion; the semi-finals were held on February 23, 1992, and the finals on March 1, 1992.

Semifinals
Mascarita Sagrada | W
Aguilita Solitaria
Octagoncito
Espectrito | W

Final
Mascarita Sagrada | W
Espectrito

== Title history ==
Key
| No. | Overall reign number |
| Reign | Reign number for the specific champion |
| Days | Number of days held |
| N/A | Unknown information |
| + | Current reign is changing daily |

| No. | Champion | Championship change | | | Reign statistics | | Notes | Ref. |
| No. | Champion | Date | Event | Location | Reign | Days | Notes | Ref. |
|---|---|---|---|---|---|---|---|---|
Consejo Mundial de Lucha Libre (CMLL)
| 1 | Mascarita Sagrada | March 1, 1992 | Live event | Mexico City, Mexico | 1 | 110 | Defeated Espectrito in the finals of a four-man tournament | |
| — | Vacated | June 19, 1992 | — | — | — | — | Mascarita Sagrada left CMLL to join AAA | |
| 2 | Orito | September 6, 1992 | Live event | Mexico City, Mexico | 1 | 189 | | |
| 3 | Último Dragoncito | March 14, 1993 | Live event | Mexico City, Mexico | 1 | 181 | | (Note: Duncan & Will (2000) p. 397 "Ultimo Dragoncito 1993/03/14 Mexico City") |
| 4 | Ultratumbita | September 11, 1993 | Live event | Mexico City, Mexico | 1 | 520 | | (Note: Duncan & Will (2000) p. 397 "Ultratumbita 1993/09/11 Mexico City") |
| 5 | Máscarita Mágica | February 13, 1995 | Live event | Mexico City, Mexico | 1 | 379 | | (Note: Duncan & Will (2000) p. 397 "Mascarita Magica 1995/02") |
| 6 | Damiancito El Guerrero | February 27, 1996 | Live event | Mexico City, Mexico | 1 | (Note: The exact date of Damiancito's title loss is unknown, which means the title reign lasted between 1,312 and 1,339 days.) | | (Note: Duncan & Will (2000) p. 397 "Damiancito 1996/02/27 Mexico City") |
| 7 | Último Dragoncito | October 1999 | N/A | N/A | 2 | (Note: The exact date of Último Dragoncito's title win is unknown, which means that his second title reign lasted between 716 and 746 days.) | Champion Damiancito El Guerrero had not worked in the minis division for over a year; the title was given to Último Dragoncito instead of vacating it. | |
| 8 | Pierrothito | October 16, 2001 | Live event | Mexico City, Mexico | 1 | 784 | | |
| 9 | Pequeño Olimpico | December 9, 2003 | Live event | Mexico City, Mexico | 1 | 1,442 | | |
| 10 | Pequeño Damián 666 | November 20, 2007 | Live event | Mexico City, Mexico | 1 | 250 | | |
| 11 | Bam Bam | July 27, 2008 | Live event | Mexico City, Mexico | 1 | 931 | | |
| 12 | Pequeño Olímpico | February 13, 2011 | Live event | Mexico City, Mexico | 2 | 1,302 | | (Note: Súper Luchas (February 14, 2011): "El Pequeño Olímpico saco toda la experiencia y se llevo el campeonato mundial mini del CMLL ante Bam Bam" ("Pequeño Olímpico used his experience to take the CMLL World Mini Championship from Bam Bam")) |
| 13 | Astral | September 7, 2014 | Live event | Mexico City, Mexico | 1 | 864 | | (Note: CMLL (September 8, 2014): "Astral es el nuevo Campeón de los Pequeños Estrellas. Después de reinar 3 años como monarca en esta división Olímpico dejo su cetro en manos de Astral." ("Astral is the new Mini-Estrellas Champion. After a 3 year reign as champion of the division, Olímpico left the crown in the hands of Astral")) |
| — | Vacated | January 18, 2017 | — | — | — | — | The championship was vacated when Astral moved into the regular division. He would no longer be considered a Mini-Estrella | |
| 14 | Shockercito | March 5, 2017 | Live event | Mexico City, Mexico | 1 | 1813 | | (Note: CMLL (March 5, 2017): "obligando a un tercer capítulo, que llegó a su fin con resultado favorable para SHOCKERCITO, que se coronó de esta forma, como el flamante Campeón de la división." ("which came to an end with a favorable result for Shockercito, who was crowned the brand new champion of the division.")) |
| 15 | Mercurio | February 20, 2022 | CMLL Domingos Arena Mexico | Mexico City, Mexico | 1 | 635 | | |
| 16 | Último Dragoncito | November 17, 2023 | Super Viernes | Mexico City, Mexico | 3 | 679 | | |
| 17 | Angelito/Pequeño Volador Jr. | September 26, 2025 | Super Viernes | Mexico City, Mexico | 1 | 418+ | On the June 18, 2026 episode of CMLL Informa, Angelito was given the new persona of Pequeño Volador Jr. | |

== Combined reigns ==
As of October 8, 2026.

Key

| Symbol | Meaning |
|---|---|
| ¤ | The exact length of at least one title reign is uncertain, so the shortest possible length is used. |
| † | Indicates the current champion |

| Rank | Wrestler | # of reigns | Combined days | Ref(s). |
|---|---|---|---|---|
| 1 | Pequeño Olimpico | 2 | 2,744 | |
| 2 | Shockercito | 1 | 1,813 | |
| 3 | Último Dragoncito ¤ | 3 | 1,576 | |
| 4 | Mercurio | 1 | 1,732 | |
| 5 | Damiancito El Guerrero ¤ | 1 | 1,312 | |
| 6 | Bam Bam | 1 | 931 | |
| 7 | Astral | 1 | 864 | |
| 8 | Pierrothito | 1 | 784 | |
| 9 | Ultratumbita | 1 | 520 | |
| 10 | Angelito/Pequeño Volador Jr. † | 1 | 418+ | |
| 11 | Mascarita Magica | 1 | 379 | |
| 12 | Pequeño Damián 666 | 1 | 250 | |
| 13 | Orito | 1 | 189 | |
| 14 | Mascarita Sagrada | 1 | 110 | |
