= Astral (wrestler) =

Mexican professional wrestler

Personal information
- Born: January 19, 1989 (age 37) Mexico City, Mexico

Professional wrestling career
- Ring name: Astral
- Billed height: 1.60 m (5 ft 3 in)
- Billed weight: 75 kg (165 lb) a
- Trained by: Moduluo; Arkangel de la Muerte; Franco Columbo; Pierrothito
- Debut: December 28, 2009

Astral is a Mexican professional wrestler, for best known for his time working for the promotion Consejo Mundial de Lucha Libre (CMLL). Initially he worked in CMLL's Mini-Estrella division, but in January 2017 it was announced that he was being moved into the "regular" division. Astral's real name is not a matter of public record, as is often the case with masked wrestlers in Mexico where their private lives are kept a secret from the wrestling fans. Astral is one of a limited number of Mini-Estrellas whose ring character is not based on the character of a wrestler from the regular division. He is a former CMLL World Mini-Estrella Champion.

== Personal life ==
Astral is the nephew of Consejo Mundial de Lucha Libre (CMLL) Mini-Estrella worker Pierrothito, who had a hand in training him for his professional wrestling career.

== Professional wrestling career ==
In Mexico, as part of the wrestling style called lucha libre, it is traditional to keep the true identity of a masked wrestler a secret, not revealing their real names and often not revealing what previous ring names they have competed under. No previous ring identities have been confirmed for Astral and it has been stated that his CMLL debut was also his professional debut, but with the traditions of Lucha Libre it is entirely possible that his debut date is for that of his ring character, not him personally, which means could have worked under other names before that point in time.

=== Consejo Mundial de Lucha Libre (2009-2019) ===
==== Mini-Estrella (2009-2017) ====
Astral competed in the 2009 CMLL Bodybuilding contest and won the Mini-Estrella's division coming in ahead of a number of competitors who were already working for CMLL. Days later, on November 28, Astral made his wrestling debut teaming up with Fantasy to defeat Pequeño Nitro and Pequeño Universo 2000 in a tag team match. While being classified as a Mini-Estrella Astral did not suffer from Dwarfism, but instead was merely shorter than the average wrestlers, something not uncommon in Lucha libre. As part of CMLL's bicentennial celebrations, celebrating the 200th anniversary of Mexico's independence CMLL held two Torneo Bicentenario tournament one of which was for the Mini-Estrellas division. The winner of the tournament would be "promoted" to compete in the regular division going forward. The tournament took place over three Sundays in August, from August 10 to 24. To qualify for the finale on August 24 a wrestler would have to win an eight-man Torneo cibernetico to outlast his competitors. Astral competed in the second block of the tournament, but was eliminated by Pierrothito. Astral was one of 16 Mini-Estrellas to compete in a Ruleta de la Muerte, ("Roulette of Death"). In a Ruleta de la Muerte tournament tag teams face off in a single elimination tournament, but unlike traditional tournaments it is the losing team that advances in this case. The team that loses the tag team match final must immediately wrestle against each other in a Lucha de Apuestas match, where either their mask or their hair is on the line. Astral teamed up with Pequeño Violencia in the fight to keep their masks safe. In the first round they lost to the team of Eléctrico and Mercurio, in the second they were defeated by Pequeño Black Warrior and Fantasy, which put them in the finals of the match, where the losing team would have to risk their mask or hair. Astral and Pequeño Violencia managed to defeat Pierrothito and Bam Bam to keep their mask and hair safe. On April 15, 2012, Astral wrestled Demus 3:16 for the vacant Distrito Federal Lightweight Championship, a title only defended in Mexico City and not exclusively for Mini-Estrellas, but wrestlers under a certain weight limit. The more experienced Demus 3:16 defeated Astral to win the vacant title. CMLL held the 2012 Pequeños Reyes del Aire tournament, with Astral being one of the 18 competitors. Astral was eliminated as the sixth competitor by Demus 3:16. After unsuccessfully challenging Demus 3:16 for the vacant Distrito Federal Lightweight Championship he was more successful in his rematch, winning his first title as he defeated Demus 3:16 on an independent wrestling show in Mexico City. On November 6, 2012, 12 competitors met in a steel cage match where the loser of the match would be forced to unmask or have his hair shaved completely off. Astral was the sixth person to exit the cage when he tried to perform a Moonsault of the top of the cage onto Mercurio, Aéreo and Fantasy who were on the floor. Due to the cage mesh breaking earlier in the match, Astral got caught up on the cage and landed awkwardly on the three men on the floor. The bad fall caused Astral to be rushed out of the arena for immediate attention and Mercurio had to be carried to the back as well due to the impact of Astral. On April 6, 2014, at Arena Coliseo's 71st anniversary event, Astral won a ten-man minis steel cage Lucha de Apuestas, forcing Pequeño Halcón to unmask. On September 7, Astral defeated Pequeño Olímpico to win the CMLL World Mini-Estrella Championship for the first time. Between 2014 and 2017 Astral was booked to successfully defend the CMLL World Mini-Estrellas Championship six times, defeating Eléctrico, Demus, Mercurio twice Auron and finally Demus for a second time.

==== Regular division (2017-2019) ====
On January 18, 2017, during CMLL's weekly Informa talk show it was announced that Astral would move into the "regular size" division from February and that he vacated the CMLL World Mini-Estrella Championship in the process. His first main division debut took place on February 10 where Astra and Principe Diamante lost to Los Cancerberos del Infierno (Cancerbero and Raziel). Astral competed in the 2017 Gran Alternativa tournament, a tournament where CMLL pairs a veteran wrestler with a relative rookie to showcase the younger wrestlers. Despite having worked for CMLL since 2009, Astral represented the rookie side as he teamed up with Valiente. The team lost to rookie Canelo Casas and his uncle Negro Casas in the first round. In March 2018 CMLL held a tournament for the vacant CMLL Arena Coliseo Tag Team Championship where they teamed Astral up with Stigma for Astral's first championship opportunity in the main division. The team lost to Flyer and The Panther in the first round. He worked his second Gran Alternativa tournament in May 2018, teaming with Niebla Roja. The duo was eliminated in the first round by Akuma and Euforia.

On May 2, 2019, Astral left CMLL. He returned in April 2022.

== Championships and accomplishments ==
- Consejo Mundial de Lucha Libre
  - CMLL World Mini-Estrella Championship (1 time)
  - CMLL Bodybuilding Contest: Minis Category (2009)
  - CMLL Bodybuilding Contest: Advanced Category (7 times - 2013, 2015, 2017-8, 2023-5)
  - Distrito Federal Lightweight Championship (1 time, current)

== Luchas de Apuestas record ==
Winner (wager)	Loser (wager)	Location	Event	Date	Notes
Astral (mask)	Pequeño Halcón (mask)	Mexico City	Arena Coliseo 71st Anniversary Show	April 6, 2014	(Note: This was a ten-way steel cage match, also involving Acero, Eléctrico, Fantasy, Pequeño Nitro, Pequeño Olímpico, Pierrothito, Stukita and Último Dragoncito.)
