= Mexican National Lightweight Championship =

Professional wrestling championship

- The face plate of the championship belt

Details
- Promotion: Consejo Mundial de Lucha Libre (CMLL)
- Date established: June 28, 1934
- Current champion: Vacant
- Date won: November 18, 2026
Statistics
- First champion: Jack O'Brien
- Most reigns: Rodolfo Ruiz (3 Reigns)
- Longest reign: Juan Diaz (5 years, 123 days)
- Shortest reign: Mishima Ota (1 day)

The Mexican National Lightweight Championship (Campeonato Nacional de Peso Ligero in Spanish) is a Mexican professional wrestling singles championship created and sanctioned by Comisión de Box y Lucha Libre Mexico D.F. ("the Mexico City Boxing and Wrestling Commission" in Spanish). Although the Commission sanctions the title, it does not promote the events in which the title is defended. As it is a professional wrestling championship, it is not won legitimately; it is instead won via a scripted ending to a match or awarded to a wrestler because of a storyline. The official definition of the lightweight weight class in Mexico is between 63 kg (139 lb) and 70 kg (150 lb), but the weight limits for the different classes are not always strictly enforced. (Note: One example of this is Mephisto once holding the NWA World Welterweight Championship, a belt with a 78 kg (172 lb) upper limit, despite weighing 90 kg (200 lb).) Since the title was brought back after being inactive for approximately four years it has been contested for in the Mini-Estrellas division exclusively.

The Mexican National Lightweight Championship was created in 1934, making it one of the oldest wrestling championships still active today. Consejo Mundial de Lucha Libre (CMLL; Spanish for World Wrestling Council) has the promotional control of the championship while the Commission only serves to approve the champions and supervise championship matches. (Note: In this statement, "control" refers to the everyday use of the title, determining which storylines the title is being used in, who gets to challenge for the title and how to use it in a public relations sense.) Jack O'Brien was recognized as the first champion in 1934, after winning a tournament sanctioned by Comisión de Box y Lucha Libre Mexico D.F. and promoted by CMLL.^{[G1][G2]} (Note: At the time CMLL was known as Empresa Mexicana de Lucha Libre (EMLL), name changed in 1992) The championship has been vacated on a number of occasions, most notably four times because the champion "moved up a weight class", once because the champion was not a Mexican citizen and once because the reigning champion, Guerrero Samurai, was killed in a car accident.^{[G1][G2]}

The championship is currently vacant, due to most-recent champion Calavera Jr. I winning the CMLL World Lightweight Championship on November 16, 2026. There have been 53 overall reigns and the 43 champions. Rodolfo Ruiz and Taro are tied for the most reigns as champion, with three in total; Mishima Ota has the shortest reign, at 1 day. Black Shadow holds the record for the longest individual reign, at over 1,901 days, while Juan Diaz held the championship 1,979 days divided over two reigns.

== Championship tournaments ==
=== 2008 Mexican National Lightweight Tournament ===
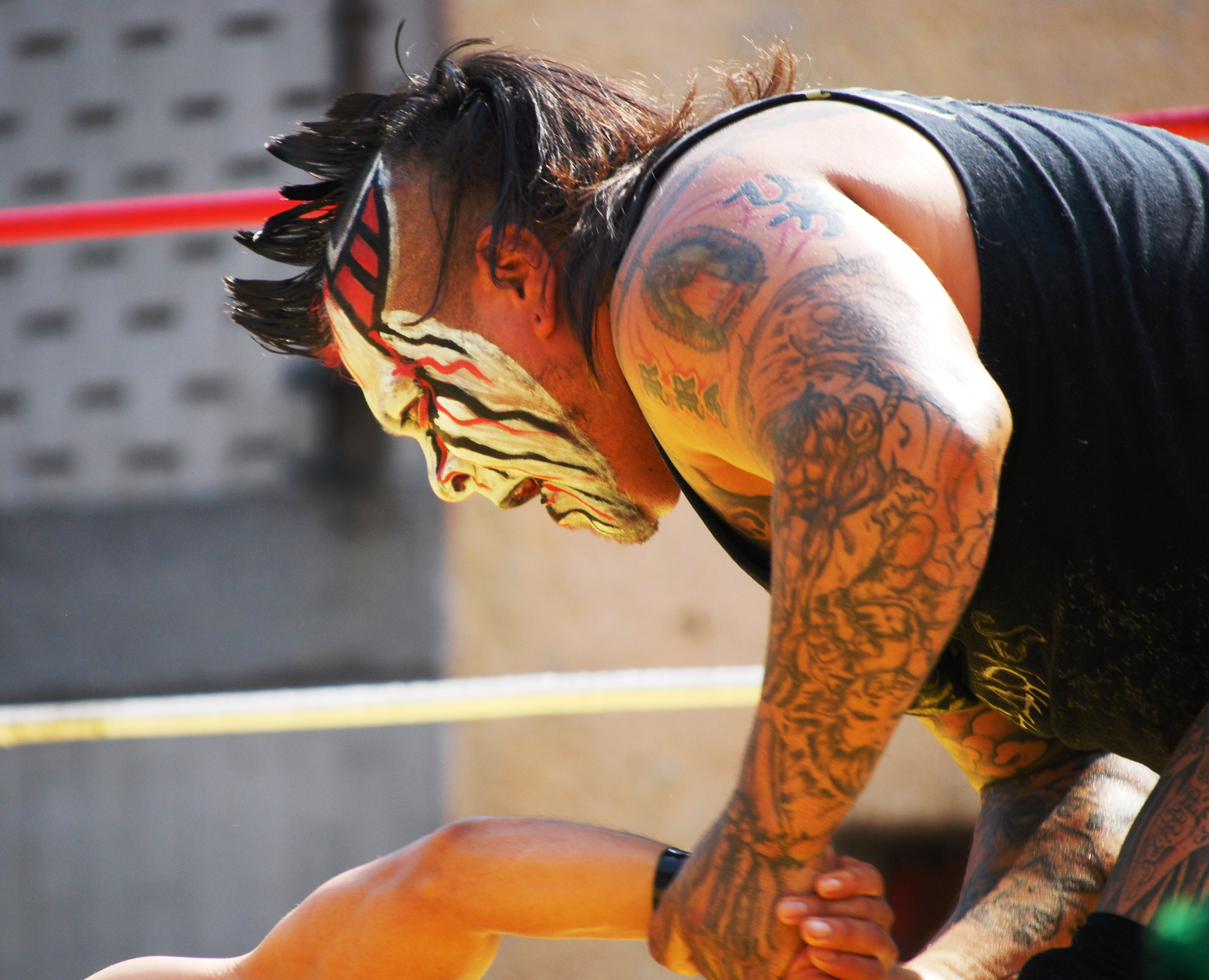
Mini Damián 666 one of 24 competitors in the 2008 tournament.

In 2008 the Mexican National Lightweight Championship was reintroduced after being vacant since 2005. CMLL held two Torneo cibernetico elimination matches, one on September 9 and one on September 16 to determine the finalists. Pierrothito won the first torneo cibernetico by eliminating Pequeño Olimpico in the end. Mascarita Dorada won the second torneo cibernetico, eliminating Pequeño Black Warrior in the last fall. On September 23, 2009, Pierrothito defeated Mascarita Dorada to win the championship, becoming the first Mini-Estrella to win the Mexican National Lightweight Championship.

Cibernetico – September 9, 2008

#	Eliminated	Eliminated by
1	Pequeño Lizmark	Mr. Aguilita
2	Pequeño Universo 2000	Bracito de Oro
3	Mr. Aguilita	Niño de Acero
4	Bracito de Oro	Fire
5	Cosmico	Último Dragóncito
6	Fire	Shockercito
7	Niño de Acero	Pierrothito
8	Último Dragoncito	Pequeño Olímpico
9	Mini Damián 666	Pequeño Olímpico
10	Shockercito	Pierrothito
11	Pequeño Olímpico	Pierrothito
12	Pierrothito	Winner

Cibernetico – September 16, 2008

#	Eliminated	Eliminated by
	Bam Bam	Unknown
2	Celestial	Unknown
3	Pequeño Ninja	Unknown
4	Pequeño Black Warrior	Unknown
5	Pequeño Halloween	Unknown
6	Fantasy	Unknown
7	Sombrita	Unknown
8	Electrico	Unknown
9	Pequeño Black Warrior	Mascarita Dorada
10	Mascarita Dorada	Winner

=== 2013 Mexican National Lightweight Tournament ===
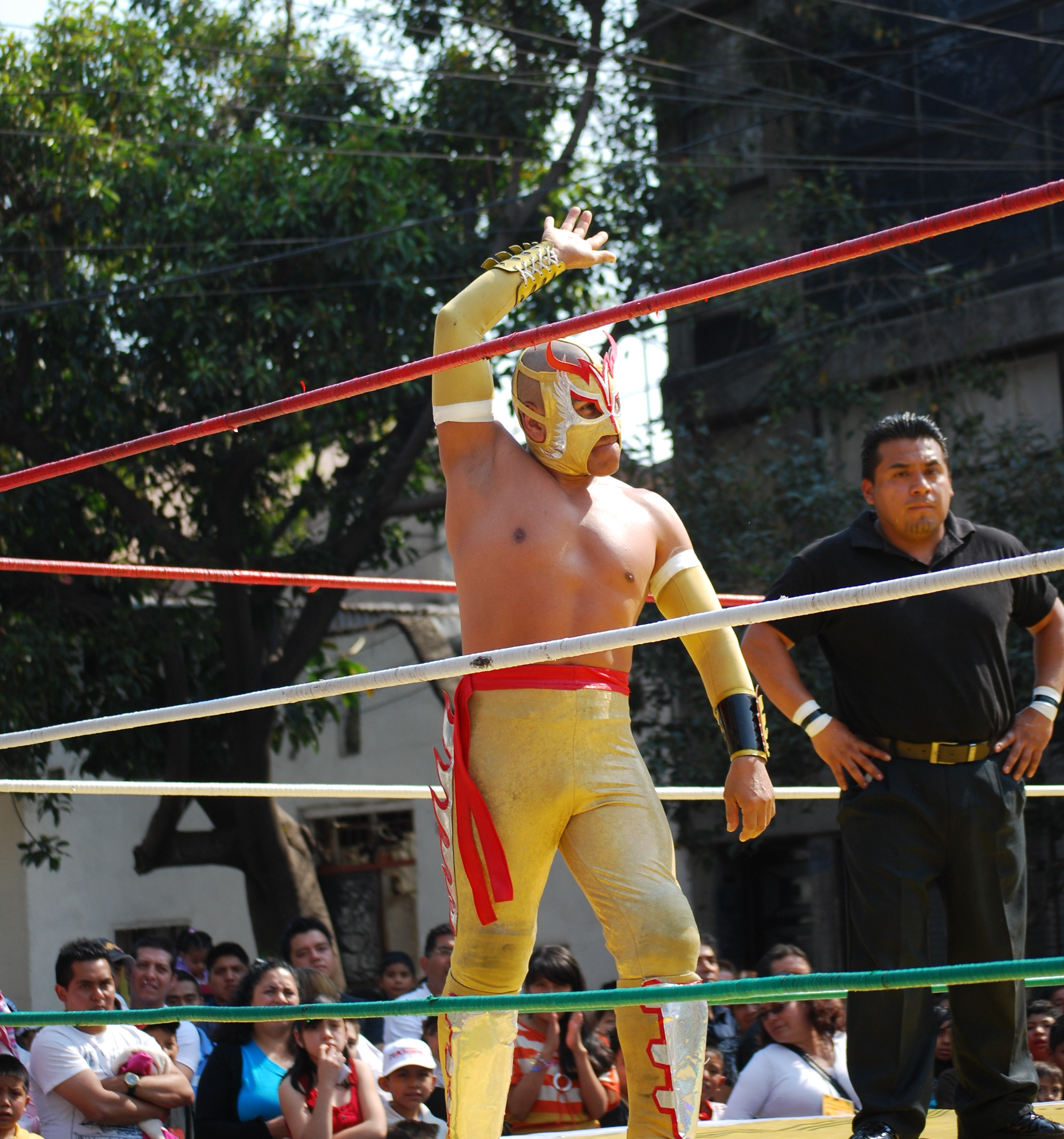
Último Dragóncito one of 12 competitors in the 2013 tournament.

On June 24, 2013, CMLL announced that the Mexican National Lightweight Championship had been vacated, without stating specifically why previous champion Pierrothito had been stripped of the championship. They also announced a 12-man tournament to determine a new champion that would start on July 30 with a six-man torneo cibernetico elimination match and a second six-man cibernetico the following week. The winners of each block faced off on August 13, 2013, to determine the new champion. The finals saw Eléctrico defeat Pequeño Nitro to win the championship.

Cibernetico – July 30, 2013

#	Eliminated	Eliminated by	Time
1	Pequeño Halcón	Shockercito	07:15
2	Shockercito	Mercurio	08:04
3	Mercurio	Bam Bam	10:58
4	Bam Bam	Pequeño Violencia	13:27
5	Pequeño Violencia	Eléctrico	16:24
6	Eléctrico	Winner	16:24

Cibernetico – August 6, 2013

#	Eliminated	Eliminated by
1	Pequeño Universo 2000	
X	Aéreo	Order of elimination not documented
X	Pequeño Black Warrior	Order of elimination not documented
X	Fantasy	Order of elimination not documented
5	Último Dragóncito	Pequeño Nitro
6	Pequeño Nitro	Winner

== Title history ==
Key
No.	Overall reign number
Reign	Reign number for the specific champion
Days	Number of days held
N/A	Unknown information
+	Current reign is changing daily

No.	Champion	Championship change			Reign statistics		Notes	Ref.
No.	Champion	Date	Event	Location	Reign	Days	Notes	Ref.
Consejo Mundial de Lucha Libre (CMLL)
1	Jack O'Brien	June 28, 1934	Live event	N/A	1	1,096	O'Brien defeated Hernandez in the final a tournament to become first champion.	^{[G1][G2]}
2	Dientes Hernandez	June 28, 1937	Live event	Mexico City, D.F.	1	324		^{[G1][G2]}
3	Jack O'Brien	May 18, 1938	Live event	Mexico City, D.F.	2	718		^{[G1][G2]}
4	Bobby Bonales	May 5, 1940	Live event	Mexico City, D.F.	1	221		^{[G1][G2]}
5	Dientes Hernandez	December 12, 1940	Live event	Mexico City, D.F.	2	666		^{[G1][G2]}
6	Adolfo Bonales	October 9, 1942	Live event	Mexico City, D.F.	1	233		^{[G1][G2]}
7	Joe Silva	May 30, 1943	Live event	Mexico City, D.F.	1	334		^{[G1][G2]}
8	Raul Romero	April 28, 1944	Live event	Mexico City, D.F.	1	717		^{[G1][G2]}
9	Emilio Charles	April 15, 1946	Live event	Mexico City, D.F.	1	(Note: The exact date on which the title was vacated is not known, which means the title reign lasted between 626 and 842 days.)		^{[G1][G2]}
—	Vacated	1948	—	—	—	—	Championship vacated for undocumented reasons	^{[G1][G2]}
10	Joe Marin	August 5, 1948	Live event	N/A	1	74		^{[G1][G2]}
11	Black Shadow	October 18, 1948	Live event	Mexico City, D.F.	1	(Note: The exact date on which the title was vacated is not known, which means the title reign lasted between 1,901 and 2,265 days.)		^{[G1][G2]}
—	Vacated	1954	—	—	—	—	Championship vacated for undocumented reasons	^{[G1][G2]}
12	Juan Diaz	March 30, 1957	Live event	N/A	1	109	Defeated Orquidea to win the vacant title	^{[G1][G2]}
13	Mishima Ota	July 17, 1957	Live event	Mexicali, Baja California	1	1		^{[G1][G2]}
—	Vacated	July 18, 1957	—	—	—	—	Championship vacated by the commission as Mishima Ota was not a Mexican citizen.	^{[G1][G2]}
14	Juan Diaz	May 17, 1958	Live event	Mexico City, D.F.	2	1,979	Defeated Jesus Garcia.	^{[G1][G2]}
15	Chanoc	October 17, 1963	Live event	Acapulco, Guerrero	1	110		^{[G1][G2]}
16	Ulises	February 4, 1964	Live event	Mexico City, D.F.	1	129		^{[G1][G2]}
17	Chanoc	June 12, 1964	Live event	Acapulco, Guerrero	2	215		^{[G1][G2]}
18	Rodolfo Ruiz	January 13, 1965	EMLL Carnaval de Campeones	Mexico City, D.F.	1	206		^{[G1][G2]}
19	Alberto Muñoz	August 7, 1965	Live event	Mexico City, D.F.	1	183		^{[G1][G2]}
—	Vacated	February 6, 1966	—	—	—	—	Championship vacated when Alberto Muñoz won the Mexican National Welterweight Championship.	^{[G1][G2]}
20	Rolando Costa	April 3, 1966	Live event	N/A	1	28	Defeated Raúl Rojas to win the vacant title	^{[G1][G2]}
21	Raul Rojas	May 1, 1966	Live event	Mexico City, D.F.	1	494		^{[G1][G2]}
22	Raul Guerrero	September 7, 1967	Live event	Mexico City, D.F.	1	348		^{[G1][G2]}
23	Estrella Blanca	August 20, 1968	Live event	Mexico City, D.F.	1	396		^{[G1][G2]}
24	Rodolfo Ruiz	September 20, 1969	Live event	Mexico City, D.F.	2	690		^{[G1][G2]}
25	Estrella Blanca	August 11, 1971	Live event	Acapulco, Guerrero	2	974		^{[G1][G2]}
26	Tauro	April 11, 1973	Live event	Mexico City, D.F.	2	647		^{[G1][G2]}
27	Dardo Aguilar	January 18, 1975	Live event	Mexico City, D.F.	1	134		^{[G1][G2]}
28	Tauro	June 1, 1975	Live event	Mexico City, D.F.	3	517		^{[G1][G2]}
29	Flama Azul	October 30, 1976	Live event	Mexico City, D.F.	1	162		^{[G1][G2]}
30	Américo Rocca	April 10, 1977	Live event	Monterrey, Nuevo León	1	82		^{[G1][G2]}
31	Flama Azul	July 1, 1977	Live event	Acapulco, Guerrero	2	82		^{[G1][G2]}
32	Mario Valenzuela	September 21, 1977	Live event	Acapulco, Guerrero	1	343		^{[G1][G2]}
33	Talismán	August 30, 1978	Live event	Acapulco, Guerrero	1	221		^{[G1][G2]}
34	Rodolfo Ruiz	April 8, 1979	Live event	Cuernavaca, Morelos	3	431		^{[G1][G2]}
35	Chamaco Valaguez	June 12, 1980	Live event	N/A	1	(Note: The exact date on which the title was vacated is not known, which means the title reign lasted between 599 and 626 days.)		^{[G1][G2]}
—	Vacated	February 1982	—	—	—	—	Championship vacated when Chamaco Valaguez moved up a weight class.	^{[G1][G2]}
36	Aristotle	May 2, 1982	Live event	Mexico City, D.F.	1	(Note: The exact date on which the title was vacated is not known, which means the title reign lasted between 425 and 455 days.)	Defeated Negro Casas in a tournament final	^{[G1][G2]}
—	Vacated	July 1983	—	—	—	—	Championship vacated when Aristotle moved up a weight class.	^{[G1][G2]}
37	Fuerza Guerrera	November 6, 1983	Live event	Mexico City, D.F.	1	(Note: The exact date on which the title was vacated is not known, which means the title reign lasted between 177 and 207 days.)	Defeated Aguila Venezolana in tournament final.	^{[G1][G2]}
—	Vacated	May 1984	—	—	—	—	Championship vacated when Fuerza Guerrera moved up a weight class.	^{[G1][G2]}
38	El Modulo	August 18, 1984	Live event	Mexico City, D.F.	1	211	Won a tournament.	^{[G1][G2]}
39	Pegasso I	March 17, 1985	Live event	Mexico City, D.F.	1	118		^{[G1][G2]}
40	El Khalifa	July 13, 1985	Live event	Puebla, Puebla	1	277		^{[G1][G2]}
41	Guerrero Samurai	April 16, 1986	Live event	Mexico City, D.F.	1	480		^{[G1][G2]}
42	El Pantera II	August 9, 1987	Live event	Mexico City, D.F.	1	181		^{[G1][G2]}
43	Guerrero Samurai	February 6, 1988	Live event	Xochimilco, D.F.	2	1,022		^{[G1][G2]}
—	Vacated	November 24, 1990	—	—	—	—	Championship vacated after Guerrero Samurai died in an automobile accident.	^{[G1][G2]}
44	Flash	July 14, 1991	Live event	Guadalajara, Jalisco	1	(Note: The exact date on which the title was vacated is not known, which means the title reign lasted between 537 and 901 days.)	Defeated Guerrero Samurai II;	^{[G1][G2]}
—	Vacated	1993	—	—	—	—	Championship vacated for unknown reasons	^{[G1][G2]}
45	Damiancito el Guerrero/Virus	May 7, 1998	Live event	Guadalajara, Jalisco	1	937	Defeated El Oriental in a tournament final. Later changed ring name to Virus.	^{[G1][G2]}
46	Ricky Marvin	November 29, 2000	Live event	Acapulco, Guerrero	1	369	Also won the CMLL Japan Super Lightweight Championship	^{[G2]}
47	Loco Max	December 3, 2001	Live event	Puebla, Puebla	1	(Note: The exact date on which the title was vacated is not known, which means the title reign lasted between 1,156 and 1,183 days.)		^{[G2]}
—	Vacated	February 2005	—	—	—	—	Championship vacated for undocumented reasons.	^{[G2]}
48	Pierrothito	September 23, 2008	Live event	Mexico City, D.F.	1	1,765	Defeated Mascarita Dorada in tournament final.	
—	Vacated	July 24, 2013	—	—	—	—	Championship vacated for unspecified reasons.	
49	Eléctrico	August 13, 2013	Live event	Mexico City, D.F.	1	3,042	Defeated Pequeño Nitro in tournament final.	
50	Panterita del Ring Jr.	December 11, 2021	Sábado de Lucha	Mexico City, D.F.	1	529		
—	Vacated	May 24, 2023	—	—	—	—	Championship vacated when Panterita moved up a weight class.	
51	Futuro	July 30, 2023	Live event	Mexico City, D.F.	1	1,210		
52	Rayo Metálico	September 27, 2024	Noche de Campeones	Mexico City, D.F.	1	785		
53	Calavera Jr. I	March 23, 2026	Lunes Clásico	Puebla, Puebla	1	243		
—	Vacated	November 18, 2026	—	—	—	—	Championship vacated on CMLL Informa 2 days after Calavera won the CMLL World Lightweight Championship.	

== Combined reigns ==
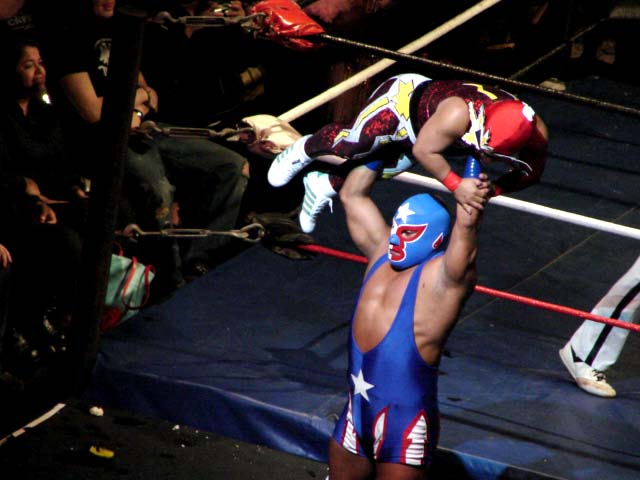
Pierrothito (in blue), the 48th champion and the first Mini-Estrella to hold the championship.

Key

Symbol	Meaning
†	Indicates the current champion
¤	The exact length of at least one title reign is uncertain, so the shortest possible length is used.
+	Indicates that the number of days held by this individual changes every day.

Rank	Wrestler	# of reigns	Combined days	Ref(s).
1	Eléctrico	1	3,042	
2	Juan Diaz	2	1,979	^{[G1][G2]}
3	Black Shadow	1	1,901¤	^{[G1][G2]}
4	Jack O'Brien	2	1,814	^{[G1][G2]}
5	Pierrothito	1	1,765	
6	Guerrero Samuari	2	1,502	^{[G1][G2]}
7	Estrella Blanca	2	1,371	^{[G1][G2]}
8	Rodolfo Ruiz	3	1,327	^{[G1][G2]}
9	Tauro	2	1,164	^{[G1][G2]}
10	Loco Max	1	1,156¤	^{[G2]}
11	Damiancito El Guerrero/Virus	1	937	^{[G1][G2]}
12	Raul Romero	1	717	^{[G1][G2]}
13	Dientes Hernandez	2	666	^{[G1][G2]}
14	Emilio Charles	1	629¤	^{[G1][G2]}
15	Chamaco Valaguez	1	599¤	^{[G1][G2]}
16	Rayo Metálico	1	543	^{[G1][G2]}
17	Flash	1	537¤	^{[G1][G2]}
18	Panterita del Ring Jr.	1	529	^{[G1][G2]}
19	Raul Rojas	1	494	^{[G1][G2]}
20	Futuro	1	426	^{[G1][G2]}
21	Aristotle	1	425¤	^{[G1][G2]}
22	Ricky Marvin	1	369	^{[G2]}^{[G1][G2]}
23	Raul Guerrero	1	348	^{[G1][G2]}
24	Mario Valenzuela	1	343	^{[G1][G2]}
25	Chanoc	2	325	^{[G1][G2]}
26	Joe Silva	1	324	^{[G1][G2]}
27	El Khalifa	1	277	^{[G1][G2]}
28	Flama Azul	2	244	^{[G1][G2]}
29	Calavera Jr. I	1	243	^{[G1][G2]}
30	Adolfo Bonales	1	233	^{[G1][G2]}
31	Bobby Bonales	1	221	^{[G1][G2]}
31	El Talisman	1	221	^{[G1][G2]}
33	El Modulo	1	211	^{[G1][G2]}
34	Alberto Muñoz	1	183	^{[G1][G2]}
35	El Pantera II	1	181	^{[G1][G2]}
36	Fuerza Guerrera	1	177¤	^{[G1][G2]}
37	Dardo Aguilar	1	134	^{[G1][G2]}
38	Ulises	1	129	^{[G1][G2]}
39	Pegasso I	1	118	^{[G1][G2]}
40	Américo Rocca	1	82	^{[G1][G2]}
41	Joe Marin	1	74	^{[G1][G2]}
42	Rolando Costa	1	28	^{[G1][G2]}
43	Mishima Ota	1	1	^{[G1][G2]}
44	?†	?	0+	^{[G1][G2]}
