= Sombrita =

Mexican professional wrestler

Personal information
- Born: Javier Teucli Roldán; July 3, 1968 (age 58) Puebla, Puebla, Mexico

Professional wrestling career
- Ring name(s): Pequeño Bronce; Sombrita
- Billed height: 155 cm (5 ft 1 in)
- Billed weight: 65 kg (143 lb)
- Trained by: Ray Mendoza; José Luis Feliciano; Hijo del Gladiador
- Debut: August, 1992
- Retired: 2011

Javier Teucli Roldán (born July 3, 1968, in Puebla, Puebla, Mexico), is a retired Mexican professional wrestler best known under the name Sombrita ("Little Shadow"). Teucli also worked under the ring name Pequeño Bronce early in his career as a smaller version of the wrestling character Bronce. Teucli worked in the Mini-Estrella division his entire career, working in the Mini division does not necessarily mean that Teucli has dwarfism as several short wrestlers work in the "Mini" division, which is what separates the Mexican Mini-Estrella from traditional Midget wrestling as practiced in the United States among other places.

== Professional wrestling career ==
Teucli Roldán trained for his professional wrestling career under Ray Mendoza, José Luis Feliciano and Hijo del Gladiador in the Consejo Mundial de Lucha Libre (CMLL) wrestling school prior to making his in-ring debut.

=== Pequeño Bronce (1992–1994) ===
He made in-ring debut for CMLL in August 1992, brought in to CMLL to fill the void in their Mini-Estrellas division after a large portion of them left CMLL in the summer of 1992 to join the newly formed Asistencia Asesoría y Administración (AAA). He initially competed as the masked "Pequeño Bronce" ("Little Bronze") a Mini-Estrella version of the wrestler known as Bronce. Pequeño Bronce regularly teamed with Orito, just like Bronce had often teamed with Oro. On October 26, 1993, Oro died after an in-ring accident. Which led to CMLL abandoning the Orito character not long after out of respect. With Orito gone from the ring Pequeño Bronce, as a character, did not last much longer in CMLL either.

=== Sombrita (1994–2011) ===
In April 1994 Teucli was given a new ring character, mask and outfit making his debut as "Sombrita" ("Little shadow"), a rudo (wrestling term for those that play the bad guys) version of La Sombra. (Note: This Sombra is not the same as the current wrestler working as La Sombra, but an older wrestler using the name in the 1990s.) Early in his career as Sombrita he won a Lucas de Apuestas, or bet match, where the loser of the match would be forced to unmask. He defeated Aguilar de Acero, forcing the future Máscara Sagrada Jr. to unmask in front of everyone in the arena. On December 13, 2002, Sombrita teamed up with Guerrerito del Futuro, only to lose to Bracito de Oro and Shockercito in the opening match of the 2002 Sin Piedad show. Sombrita appeared on the CMLL 72nd Anniversary Show that took place on September 16, 2005, where he teamed up with Pequeño Violencia and Pierrothito, losing to the trio of Bam Bam, Pequeño Olímpico and Último Dragoncito. Sombrita was one of 10 Mini-Estrellas competing in the first ever Pequeños Reyes del Aire ("Little Kings of the Air") tournament, a Mini-Estrella version of the Reyes del Aire tournament. Sombrita was the first man eliminated as he was pinned by Bracito de Oro. In September 2008 CMLL reintroduced the Mexican National Lightweight Championship, promoting it in the Mini-Estrella's division as a secondary title along with the CMLL World Mini-Estrella Championship. Sombrita entered the tournament for the vacant championship, but did not make it past the qualifying torneo cibernetico elimination match on September 16, 2008. After making only sporadic appearances for a year or two Sombrita competed in an Infierno en el Ring Steel cage match where the last man in the cage would be forced to unmask. The match also included Asturiano, Bracito de Oro, Eléctrico, Fantasy, Mascarita Dorada, Pequeño Black Warrior, Pequeño Ninja, Pequeño Olímpico, Pequeño Universo 2000, Pierrothito, Sauron, Tzuki and Último Dragoncito. In the end the match came down to Sombrita and Mascarita Dorada, with Dorada pinning his opponent to win the match. Following the match Sombrita was forced to remove his mask and state his birth name as per the Luchas de Apuestas stipulations. The mask loss would be Teucli last match in CMLL, wrestling only a few sporadic matches on the Mexican Independent circuit before his retirement in 2011.

== Luchas de Apuestas record ==
Winner (wager)	Loser (wager)	Location	Event	Date	Notes
Sombrita (mask)	Aguilar de Acero (mask)	N/A	Live event	N/A	
Mascarita Dorada (mask)	Sombrita (mask)	Puebla, Puebla	CMLL Live event	March 6, 2009	(Note: Last two men in a Steel cage match that also included Asturiano, Bracito de Oro, Eléctrico, Fantasy, Pequeño Black Warrior, Pequeño Ninja, Pequeño Olímpico, Pequeño Universo 2000, Pierrothito, Sauron, Tzuki and Último Dragoncito.)
