= Último Dragoncito =

Mexican professional wrestler (born 1972)

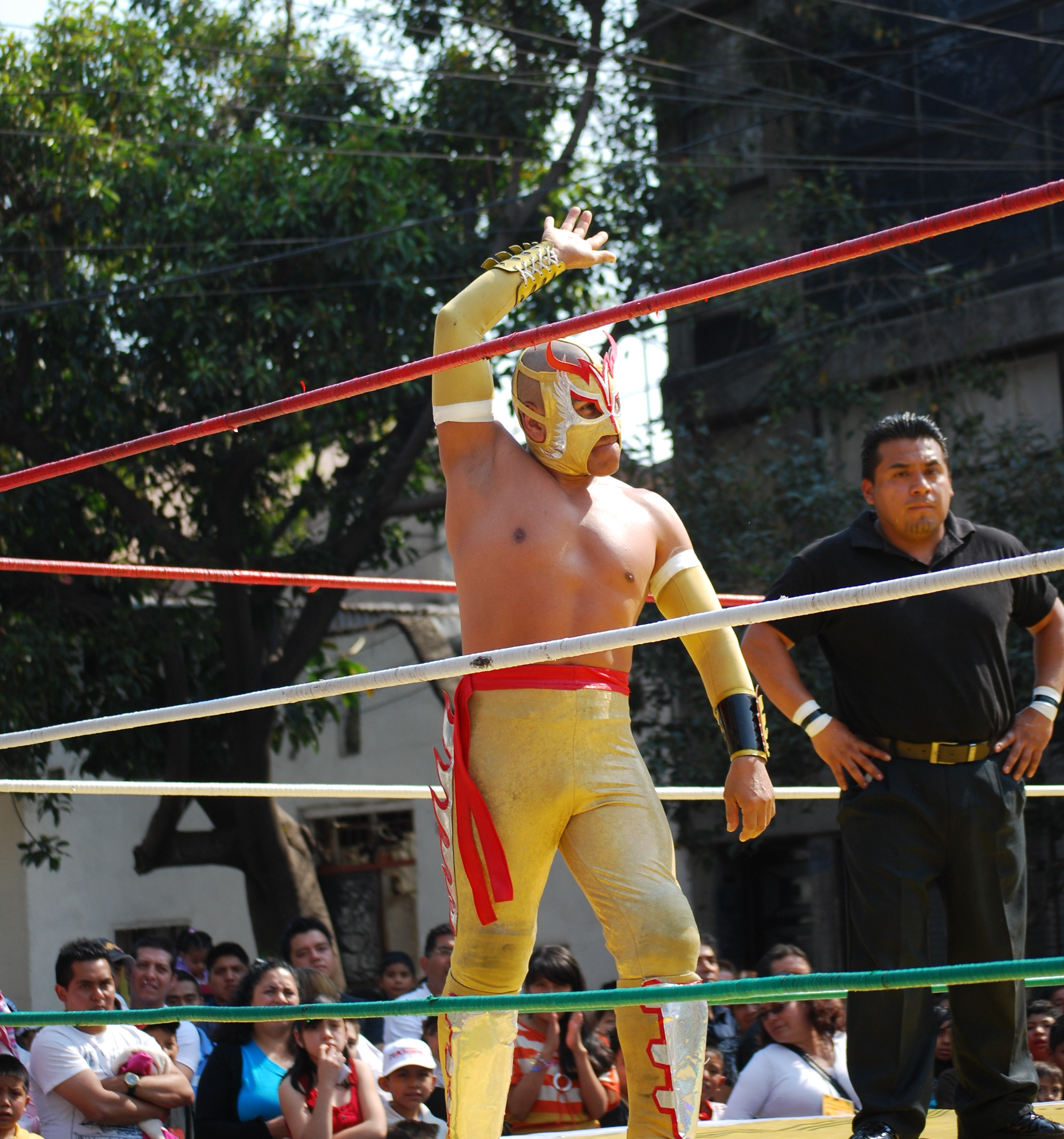
- Último Dragoncito at a community event in Colonia Obrera in Mexico City

Personal information
- Born: Miguel Ángel Arciniega Peña; August 8, 1972 (age 54) Guadalajara, Jalisco, Mexico

Professional wrestling career
- Ring name(s): Misteriosito; Último Dragoncito
- Billed height: 1.58 m (5 ft 2 in)
- Billed weight: 73 kg (161 lb)
- Trained by: Apolo Dantés; Cesar Apolo Dantés; Diablo Velasco; Gran Cochisse
- Debut: Prior to 1991 (Note: 1991 was the official date given by CMLL, but working as Misteriosito predates that by a couple of years.)

Miguel Ángel Arciniega Peña (born August 8, 1972), better known by his ring name Último Dragoncito ("Little Last Dragon"), is a Mexican professional wrestler. He works for Consejo Mundial de Lucha Libre (CMLL), where he is part of the Mini-Estrella (or "Mini"), division and is the current CMLL World Mini-Estrella Champion in his third reign. His ring name alludes to the fact that he wrestles as a mini version of Último Dragón. He originally worked as Misteriosito from his debut until 1992 when he was given his current ring name. On July 29, 2022, he lost his mask to Pequeño Olímpico at a Viernes Espectacular show.

== Personal life ==
Miguel Ángel Arciniega Peña was born on August 8, 1972, in Guadalajara, Jalisco, Mexico. At the age of seven he became a big fan of professional wrestling, especially the professional wrestler known as Gallo Tapado ("The Hooded Rooster") who was a Guadalajara regular. Later on he began going to the gym to get in shape before approaching Diablo Velasco to possibly train him. Velasco turned him down, stating he was simply too short to be a luchador, standing at only 1.50 m (4 ft 11 in) at the time. He suggested that maybe if he learned Olympic style wrestling he may have a chance. He began training with Cesar and Apolo Dantés, learning the wrestling basics and trained for with them for several years before actually being taught lucha libre.

== Professional wrestling career ==
With his small size the future Último Dragoncito did not get any bookings right away until a local promoter needed a team to work a show, with the future Dragoncito being told that he was only included to make up the numbers. Following his in-ring debut, under an undisclosed ring name, he was finally accepted as a professional wrestler and began working on a regular basis. He was given the ring character "Misteriosito", (Note: A different wrestler works as "Misteriosito", primarily in and around Southern California.) a Mini-Estrella version of regular-sized wrestler Misterioso, working both in Guadalajara and Mexico City for Consejo Mundial de Lucha Libre (CMLL), Mexico's largest wrestling promotion. Working in the Mini division does not mean that Dragoncito is a dwarf as a number of wrestlers of short stature work in the "Mini" division as well. In 1992 then-CMLL booker Antonio Peña left CMLL to form his own promotion, Asistencia Asesoría y Administración (AAA); Peña had been the mastermind behind the CMLL Mini-Estrella and most of the Minis in CMLL decided to leave with Peña, but Misteriosito was not one of them. In the months following Peña's exodus Misteriosito found himself without any bookings for CMLL. When he approached CMLL owner Paco Alonso he realised that Lutteroth thought he had left CMLL with Peña, then apologized and paid Misteriosito for the months he sat at home without working.

=== Último Dragoncito (1992–present) ===
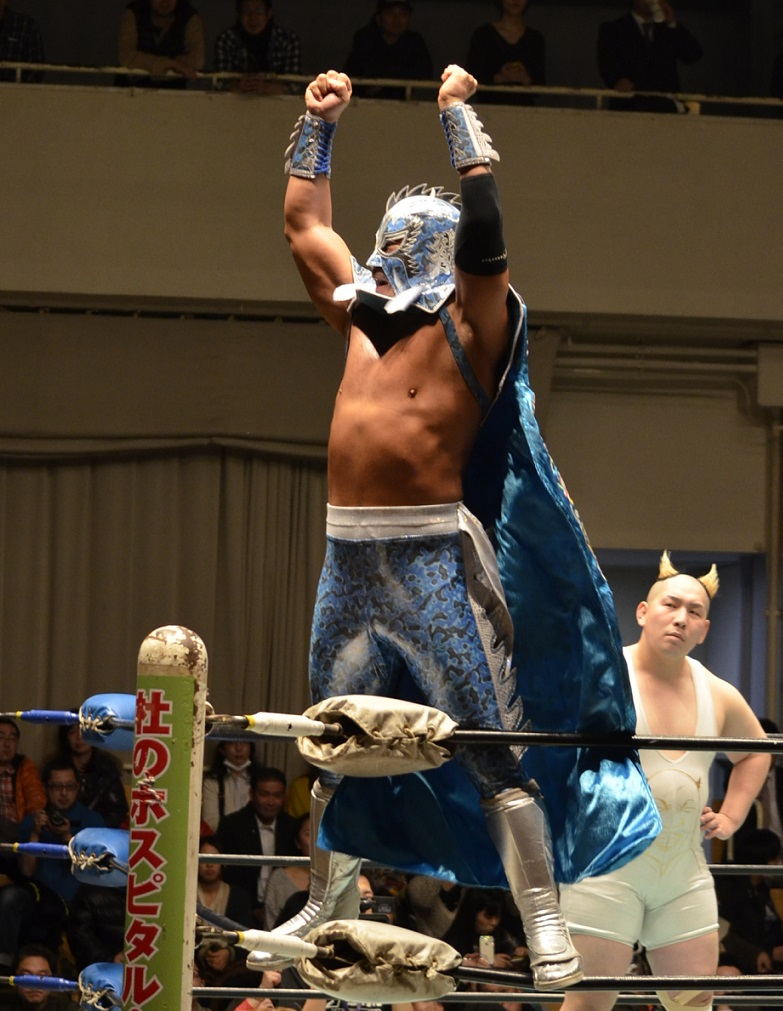
Último Dragón, the ring character Último Dragoncito was based on.

Following the 1992 Mini-Estrella exodus CMLL licensed the rights for the character "Último Dragoncito", a mini version of Último Dragón who worked in CMLL at the time. Último Dragoncito has worked under that ring name ever since, even after Último Dragon left the promotion. On March 14, 1993 Último Dragoncito defeated Orito to win the CMLL World Mini-Estrella Championship. Dragoncito would hold the title for just under six months, without making a single successful title defense before losing the championship to Ultratumbita on September 11, 1993. On September 19, 1997 Último Dragoncito worked the CMLL 64th Anniversary Show, CMLL's biggest show of the year, teaming up with Cicloncito Ramirez to defeat Damiancito el Guerrero and Pierrothito in the opening match of the show. In the mid to late-1990s CMLL did not focus much on their Minis division, and rarely made it onto their television shows which meant that Último Dragoncito only used sparingly for a number of years. In October 1999 it was announced that Último Dragoncito had won the CMLL World's Mini-Estrella Championship for the second time, making him the only wrestler to ever hold the title twice. Último Dragoncito did not win the title in a match, but rather through what is known as a "Phantom title switch", CMLL needed previous champion Damiancito El Guerrero to lose the championship as he had already begun working as in the regular division as "Virus". Instead of making him lose in the ring CMLL decided to announce that Último Dragoncito had won the belt on an undisclosed day in October 1999. Último Dragoncito held the title for two years, but as the Mini division was not very active he only made one successful title defense, against Pequeño Aristoteles, before losing the title to Pierrothito on October 16, 2001. As part of the Entre Torre Infernal ("In the Infernal Tower") show Dragoncito, Bracito de Oro and Cicloncito Ramirez defeated Fire, El Fierito and Pierrothito in the opening match of the show. He also worked the 2001 Juicio Final ("Final Justice") show, where Dragoncito and Tzuki defeated El Fierito and Pierrothito, two falls to one. His next major show was the 2004 Sin Piedad' ("No Mercy") show on December 17, 2004, where Dragoncito and Tzuki defeated Espectrito and Pierrothito in the opening match of the show. Dragoncito also worked the CMLL 72nd Anniversary Show in 2005, teaming up with Bam Bam, Pequeño Olímpico to defeat Pequeño Violencia, Pierrothito and Sombrita.

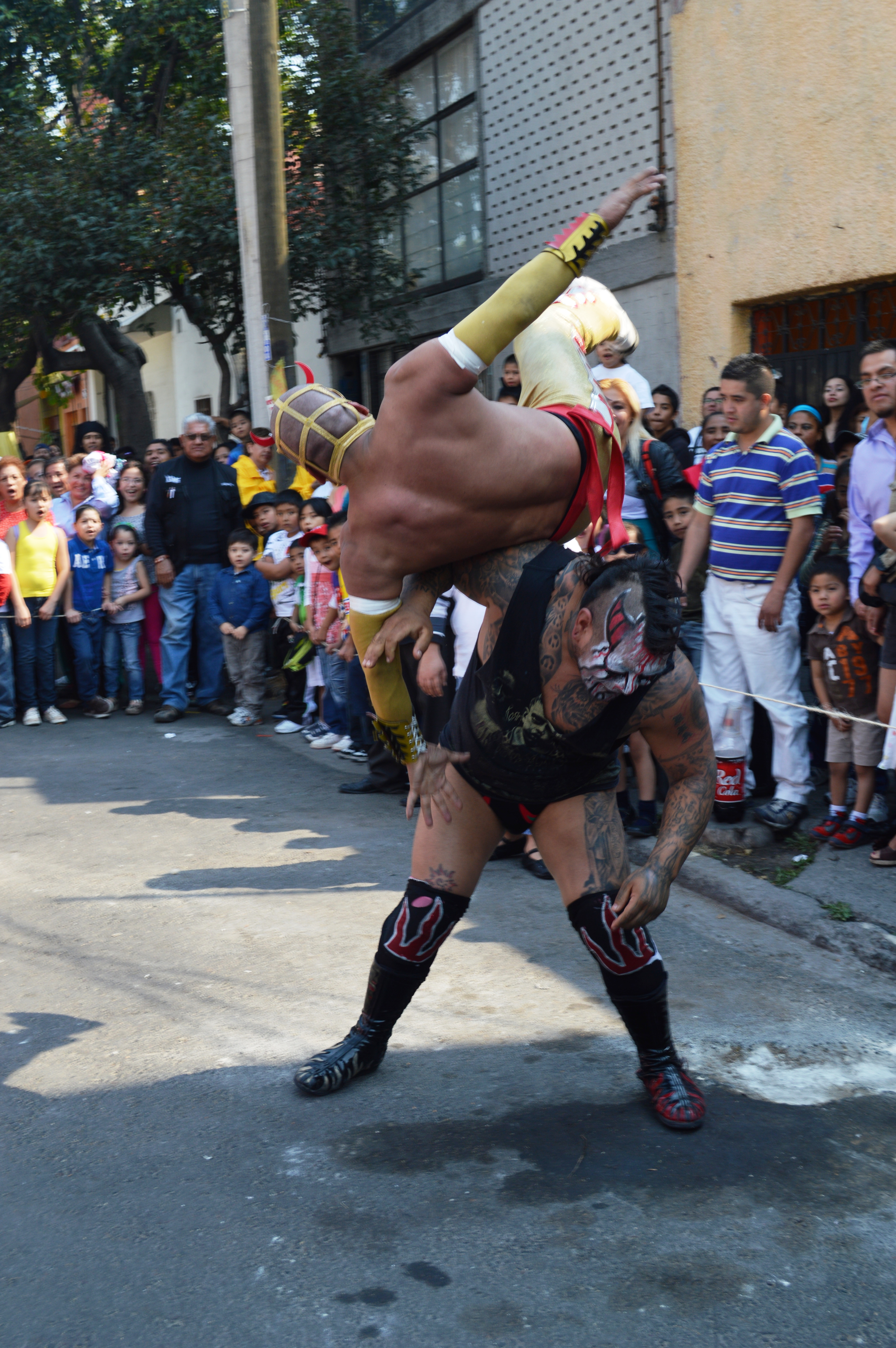
Dragoncito diving onto Demus 3:16 at an outdoor event.

Último Dragoncito remained one of CMLL's main "tecnico" (Face or "good guy") Minis as the Mini division got more air time and promotional focus than in previous years. On October 27, 2008 Último Dragoncito won the mask of Fire by winning a Luchas de Apuestas, mask vs. mask match. In 2008 CMLL decided that the previously inactive Mexican National Lightweight Championship would be brought back and used as a secondary title in the Mini-Estrellas division. Último Dragoncito entered a torneo cibernetico elimination match Lightweight Championship tournament on September 9, 2008, during the match he eliminated Cosmico but was in turn pinned by Pequeño Olímpico to be eliminated from the match. Último Dragoncito was one of 13 Minis that risked their mask in a Steel Cage match, in the main event of CMLL's La Hora Cero ("Zero Hour") Pay-Per-View on January 11, 2009. Último Dragoncito was the 10th wrestler to escape the cage to save his mask. A few weeks later, on the annual Homejae a Dos Leyendas ("Homage to Two Legends") show Dragoncito, Pequeño Olímpico and Shockercito defeated Pequeño Violencia, Pequeño Black Warrior and Pierrothito. On January 6, 2009, he competed in his first ever Pequeños Reyes del Aire ("Little Kings of the Air") where he was the eight participant eliminated after a leap out of the ring went wrong and he crashed into the audience and was unable to continue in the match. He also competed in the 2010 Pequeños Reyes del Aire tournament, eliminating Pequeño Black Warrior and Pequeño Damián 666 before being eliminated by eventual tournament winner Pequeño Nitro. Dragoncito, Shockercito and Mascarita Dorada lost to Pequeño Olímpico, Pequeño Black Warrior and Pierrothito on the under-card of the CMLL Entre el Cielo y el Infierno ("Between Heaven and Hell") show on October 15, 2010. The following year Electrico and Último Dragóncito lost to Demus 3:16 and Pierrothito on CMLL's year end Sin Piedad show. In 2012 Último Dragóncito won the 2012 Pequeños Reyes del Aire tournament held in Mexico City, eliminating Pequeño Olímpico and Pierrothito to win the tournament. A few months later CMLL held a Guadalajara version of the 2012 Pequeños Reyes del Aire tournament, but this time he was the last man eliminated by tournament winner Pequeño Black Warrior. On November 6, 2012, 12 competitors met in a special steel cage match where the loser of the match would be forced to unmask or have his hair shaved completely off. The match was very chaotic and saw several wrestlers bleed and others need medical attention due to a number of accidents. Último Dragoncito was the eight person overall to escape the cage, one of the few people to escape the match unscathed. Astral, Electrico and Ultimo Dragoncito defeated Pierrothito, Pequeño Violencia and Pequeño Nitro as part of the 2011 Homenaje a Dos Leyendas show. In mid-2013 the Mexican National Lightweight Championship was vacated and CMLL held a tournament to find a new champion. Dragoncito entered a torneo cibernetico elimination match on August 6 for a spot in the finals of the tournament. He was the last man eliminated by finalist Pequeño Nitro. In the winter of 2013/early 2014 Último Dragóncito began a storyline feud with then CMLL World Mini-Estrellas Champion Pequeño Olímpico over the championship. As part of the build to an eventual title match between the two Pequeño Olímpico and Último Dragóncito eliminated each other from the 2014 Pequeños Reyes del Aire tournament via a double pin. Dragoncito would later receive a title match but was unable to become a three time champion. On April 6, 2014, Dragoncito was one of 10 wrestlers putting their mask on the line in a Steel Cage match that was the main event of the 71. Aniversario de Arena Coliseo show. Dragoncito escaped with his mask while Pequeño Halcón was pinned by Astral and had to unmask afterwards. On October 5, 2015 14 Mini-Estrellas, including Dragoncito, competed in a battle royal to determine the #1 contender for the CMLL World Mini-Estrellas Championship, the match was won by Electrico. Dragoncito participated in the 2015 Pequeños Reyes del Aire tournament, his sixth overall tournament, but was eliminated as the fourth over-all competitor. For the 30th anniversary of the Pequeños Estrellas, a Torneo Cibérnetico (Cybernetic Tournament) was made, in which Full Metal, Pequeño Pólvora, Pierrothito, Pequeño Olímpico, Pequeño Violencia, Minos, Mercurio, Aéreo, Angelito, Fantasy, Último Dragoncito, Shockercito, Acero, Pequeño Magia and Kaligua participated. Dragoncito and Olímpico were the losers to Shockercito and Mercurio, respectively. Dragoncito and Olímpico fought in one round and Olímpico defeated Dragoncito.

On July 29, 2022, Dragoncito lost a Lucha de Apuestas match to Pequeño Olímpico, after which he was forced to unmask and reveal his birth name, Miguel Ángel Arciniega Peña.

== Championships and accomplishments ==
- Consejo Mundial de Lucha Libre
  - CMLL World Mini-Estrella Championship (3 times)
  - Pequeños Reyes del Aire (2012)

== Luchas de Apuestas record ==
Winner (wager)	Loser (wager)	Location	Event	Date	Notes
Último Dragoncito (mask)	Pequeño Black Star (mask)	N/A	CMLL live event	N/A	
Último Dragoncito (mask)	Payacito Coco Amarillo (mask)	N/A	CMLL live event	N/A	
Último Dragoncito (mask)	Pequeño Aristoteles (mask)	Acapulco, Guerrero	CMLL show	Unknown	
Último Dragoncito (mask)	Fire (mask)	Puebla, Puebla	CMLL show	October 27, 2008	
Pequeño Olímpico (mask)	Último Dragoncito (mask)	Mexico City, Mexico	CMLL show	July 29, 2022	
