= Mascarita Dorada =

Mexican professional wrestler (born 1982)

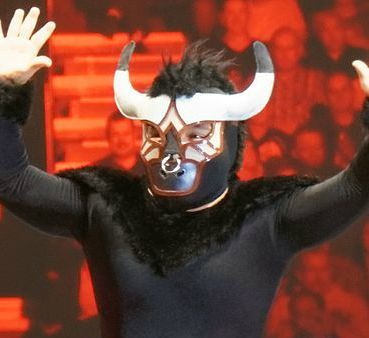
- Dorada in 2013

Personal information
- Born: February 19, 1982 (age 44) Guadalajara, Jalisco, Mexico

Professional wrestling career
- Ring name(s): El Bunny; El Charrito; El Duende #2; El Lobo; El Torito; Lil' Chicken; Mascarita Dorada; Mascarita Plateada; Mascarita Sagrada; Mascarita Sagrada 2000; Minihausen; Santocito; Toritohausen; Speedy Gonzales
- Billed height: 1.33 m (4 ft 4 1/2 in)
- Billed weight: 45 kg (99 lb)
- Billed from: Plaza de Toros
- Trained by: Indio Vitel
- Debut: January 3, 2000

Mascarita Dorada (Spanish: Little Golden Mask; born February 19, 1982) is the ring name of a Mexican professional wrestler, who works in Mexico's Mini-Estrella divisions, comparable to midget wrestling. He is also known for his tenure with Consejo Mundial de Lucha Libre as Mascarita Dorada and WWE under the ring name El Torito (Spanish for The Little Bull). He is signed to Lucha Libre AAA Worldwide and WWE under the ring name Mascarita Sagrada.And Minihausen

From 2000 until 2007, he worked under the name Mascarita Sagrada in Asistencia Asesoría y Administración (AAA), taking over after the original Mascarita Sagrada left AAA. In 2007 he moved from AAA to join Consejo Mundial de Lucha Libre (CMLL) he changed name to Mascarita Dorada. After leaving CMLL in 2011, he began wrestling for El Hijo del Santo under the ring name Mascarita Plateada, while also returning to AAA under the Mascarita Dorada ring name. He is a former two-time Mexican National Mini-Estrella Champion and co-holder of the AAA Mascot Tag Team Championship along with Máscara Sagrada. Mascarita Dorada's real name is not a matter of public record, as is often the case with masked wrestlers in Mexico where their private lives are kept a secret from professional wrestling fans.

== Professional wrestling career ==
The wrestler who would later become known as Mascarita Dorada made his debut in early 2000 after training under Indio Vitela for over a year. Initially he used the ring name "Speedy Gonzales", named after the cartoon character of the same name.

=== Asistencia Asesoría y Administración (2000–2007) ===
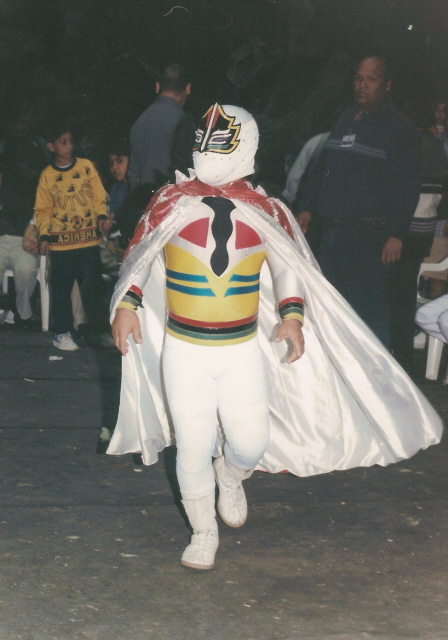
In Triple A, Mascarita Dorada was given the mask and outfit of Mascarita Sagrada

In late 1999 the original Mascarita Sagrada left Asistencia Asesoría y Administración, leading to AAA owner Antonio Peña searching for a wrestler to take over the mask and outfit. After seeing Speedy Gonzales in the ring Peña immediately signed him to a contract and gave him the name Mascarita Sagrada 2000, the "2000" was dropped from his name within months. His first appearance at a major show came on March 5, 2000 when he teamed with Octagoncito and La Parkita to defeat Mini Abismo Negro, Mini Psicosis and Rocky Marvin on the 2000 Rey de Reyes show. In 2001 he made his first Triplemanía appearance at Triplemanía IX where he teamed with La Parkita and Octagoncito to defeat Mini Abismo Negro, Rocky Marvin and Espectrito. On August 6, 2001 Mascarita Sagrada defeated Rocky Marvin to win the Mexican National Mini-Estrella Championship. Over the next year Sagrada would defend against Mini Psicosis and Mini Abismo Negro in the only two recorded title defenses in his 909-day title reign. On December 13, 2002 Mascarita Sagrada and Mascara Sagrada teamed up to defeat Mini Abismo Negro and Abismo Negro to win the AAA Mascot Tag Team Championship, a title where only a regular sized and a Mini using the same ring character could challenge for the title. The team held the title for almost two years, making successful title defenses against El Alebrije and Cuije, Monster and Chucky, Abismo Negro and Mini Abismo Negro as well as several title defenses against Psicosis II and Mini Psicosis. On February 1, 2004 Mascarita Sagrada lost the Mexican Minis title to Mini Abismo Negro, ending his almost three-year-long reign. On August 20, 2004 the team of El Alebrije and Cuije defeated Mascara Sagrada and Mascarita Sagrada to win the Mascot Tag Team title in a match that also included Monsther and Chucky, and Psicosis and Mini Psicosis as well. On November 5, 2004 Mascarita Sagrada regained the Mexican Minis title from Mini Abismo Negro. Over the next couple of years Mascarita Sagrada and indeed the entire minis division worked fewer and fewer matches, only occasionally appearing on TV. In 2007 Mascarita Sagrada decided to leave AAA, taking an offer from rival Consejo Mundial de Lucha Libre (CMLL) that guaranteed both more money and more ring time. When he left AAA he was still the Mexican National Mini-Estrella Champion and has never officially been stripped of the title, the title is considered inactive from the moment he left AAA.

=== Consejo Mundial de Lucha Libre (2007–2011) ===
Since AAA held the rights to the name "Mascarita Sagrada" and because CMLL wanted to market him as a "CMLL creation" they decided to give him a new outfit, mask and name – creating the gold and black outfit and mask of Mascarita Dorada ("Little Golden Mask"). Mascarita Dorada made his debut in late 2007, teaming with Pequeño Olímpico in his first match to defeat Fire and Pequeño Black Warrior. On January 4, 2008 Mascarita Dorada won the 2008 Pequeño Reyes del Aire ("Little kings of the air") tournament when he won a 10-man torneo cibernetico, defeating Bam Bam, Fantasy, Fire, Mr. Aguilta, Pequeño Damián 666, Pequeño Halloween, Pequeño Black Warrior, Shockercito and Tzuki. The win earned Mascarita Dorada a title match for the CMLL World Mini-Estrella Championship the following week, but lost to then champion Pequeño Damián 666. On March 31, 2008 Mascarita Dorada teamed up with Bam Bam and Tzuki to defeat Fire, Pequeño Damián 666 and Pierrothito on the undercard of the 2008 Homenaje a Dos Leyendas show.

In August, 2008 Mascarita Dorada worked a four-date tour of Portugal arranged by the Southern California-based Pro Wrestling Revolution. On three of the nights Dorada defeated Pierrothito in singles matches and on one night he teamed with El Hijo de Rey Misterio to defeat Pierrothito and American Pride. On August 29, 2008 Dorada, Fantasy and Pequeño Olímpico lost to Pequeño Damián 666, Pequeño Black Warrior and Pierrothito in the opening match of CMLL's 2008 Sin Piedad show. By the fall of 2008 Mascarita Dorada's matches were so well received and he became so popular with the fans that CMLL decided to create a large version of the character, Máscara Dorada. This was the first time ever that a regular sized wrestler was based on a Mini and not vice versa. While the two Doradas wore the same outfit CMLL never books them as a team, preferring to keep the Mini-Estrellas separate from their regular size division.

On September 16, 2008 Mascarita Dorada won a Tornero cybernetic match, qualifying for the finals of a tournament to crown a new Mexican National Lightweight Championship. The following week Dorada lost to Pierrothito, furthering the storyline feud between the two. Mascarita Dorada participated in the 2009 version of the Pequeños Reyes del Aire tournament, but was not able to repeat the success of the previous year. Four days later Mascarita Dorada was one of thirteen Mini-Estrellas who put their mask on the line in a Lucha de Apuesta cage match, Dorada was the last to escape the cage leaving Pierrothito and Shockertito to fight over who had to unmask. On March 6, 2009 Mascarita Dorada once again participated in an "All-Minis" cage match where all 14 wrestlers put their masks on the line. This time Pierrothito was the last to escape the cage, leaving Mascarita Dorada and Sombrita to fight it out. Mascarita Dorada pinned Sombrita and forced him to unmask after the match, per Lucha libre traditions.

Throughout 2009 Mascarita Dorada and Pierrothito has faced off several times, both in CMLL and for various other promotions including PWR, Toryumon and two matches in August, 2009 for Chikara that the two split between them with one win each. The two were also involved in a 15-man cage match under Lucha de Apuesta rules, this time mixed Mini-Estrellas and local wrestlers. In the end Mascarita Dorada escaped, once again leaving Pierrothito as one of the men fighting for his mask. At the CMLL's Sin Salida show on December 4, 2009 Mascarita Dorada defeated Pequeño Damián 666 in a Lighting Match, a one fall match between two single competitors. (Note: In CMLL the most common match form is trios tag team matches, three vs. three and almost always two out of three falls. Even most singles matches are two out of three falls.)

On February 28, 2010 Mascarita Dorada wrestled for El Hijo del Santo's Todo x Todos promotion on a show in Brussels Belgium where he wrestled as Santocito, a mini version of El Santo, the first time a Mini version of El Santo has ever been allowed in wrestling. Mascarita Dorada was fired by CMLL in early March 2010 for participating in a Hijo del Santo promoted show after being told he was not allowed to do so.

Mascarita Dorada returned to CMLL on April 2, 2010 wrestling on the Friday night Super Viernes show, before finally quitting the promotion in October 2011.

=== Independent circuit (2011–2012) ===
After leaving CMLL, Mascarita Dorada began working for El Hijo del Santo under the new ring name Mascarita Plateada, under which he went on to win World Wrestling Association's World Minis Championship on November 3, 2011. On January 29, 2012, Dorada made an appearance for Southern California-based Pro Wrestling Guerrilla (PWG), teaming with B-Boy, Candice LeRae and Cedric Alexander in an eight-person tag team match, where they defeated Demus 3:16, Joey Ryan, Peter Avalon and Ray Rosas.

=== Return to AAA (2011–2012) ===
On November 14, he returned to AAA under the Mascarita Dorada ring name, attacking Los Mini Psycho Circus. In his AAA return match on December 16 at Guerra de Titanes, Dorada pinned AAA World Mini-Estrella Champion Mini Psicosis (not to be confused with the original Mini Psicosis) in a six-man tag team match. On May 19, 2012, Mascarita Dorada received his first shot at the AAA World Mini-Estrella Championship, but was defeated by Mini Psicosis, after being unmasked and hit with the illegal Martinete maneuver.

=== WWE (2013–2016) ===
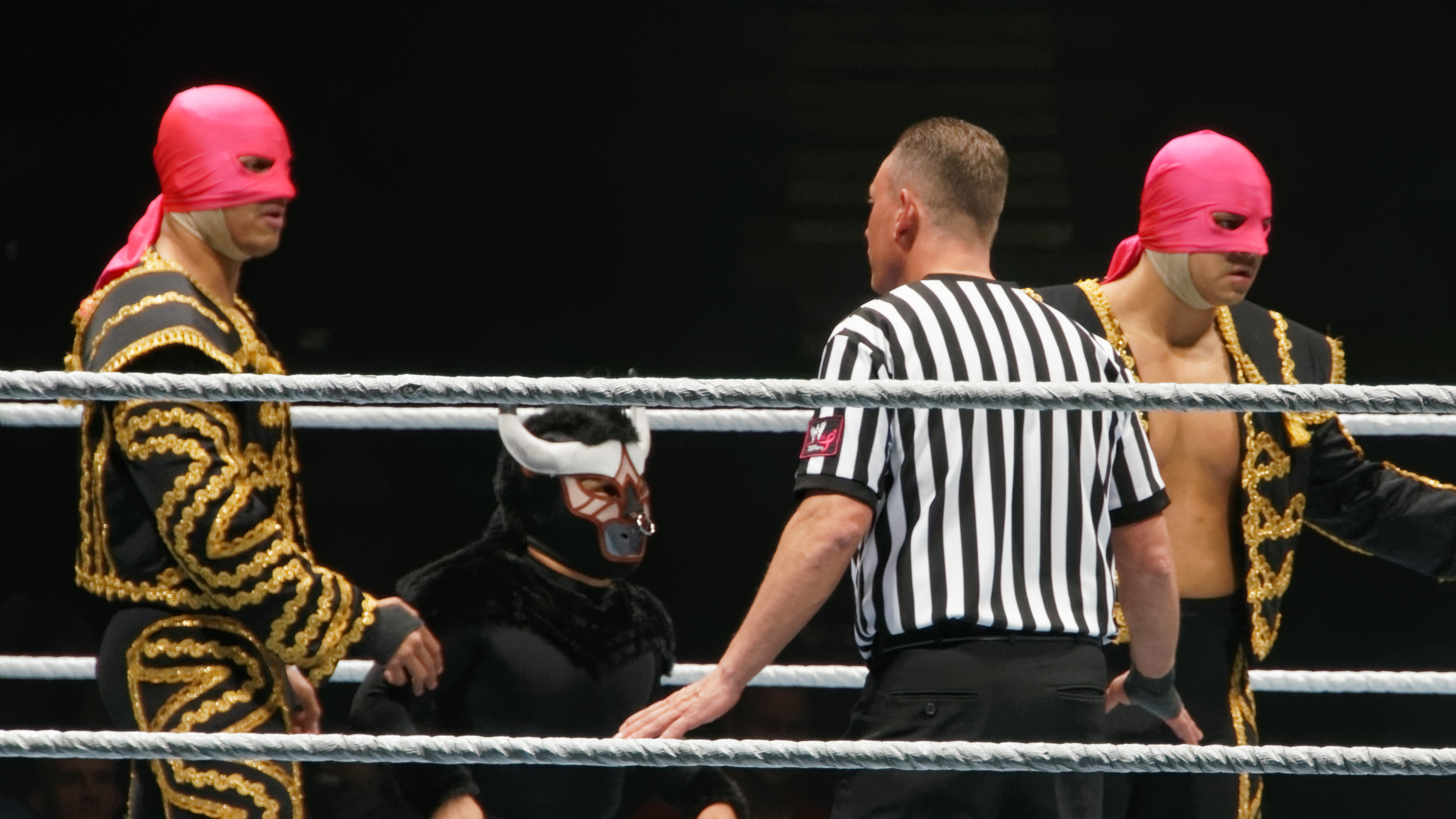
El Torito along Diego and Fernando during a WWE house show in 2013

On April 3, 2013, it was reported that Mascarita Dorada had signed a developmental deal contract with WWE. He adopted and made his debut under the ring name El Torito on the September 30, episode of Raw, as the mascot of Los Matadores.

On January 26, 2014, El Torito participated in his first Royal Rumble match entering at #20; eliminating Fandango before being eliminated by Roman Reigns. He scored his first victory in a ten-man tag match on the February 24 episode of Main Event, after pinning Heath Slater. He started his first rivalry, with Hornswoggle, who is another smaller size wrestler in the WWE, of Heath Slater's 3MB. They fought at Extreme Rules, where El Torito defeated Hornswoggle in a WeeLC match. They had a rematch at the Payback pre-show in a Mask vs. Hair match, in which Torito won again and proceeded to shave Hornswoggle bald post-match.

On March 29, 2015, a fatal four-way for the WWE Tag Team Championship took place on the WrestleMania 31 pre-show, with Los Matadores included, but they failed to win the titles.

On the September 7 episode of Raw, El Torito set up a distraction for Los Matadores during a tag team match against The Dudley Boyz, costing them the victory. Post-match, he was assaulted by Diego, but was saved by The Dudley Boyz, who performed an Aided superbomb through a table on him. This would mark the end of his association with Los Matadores. Following the end of the stable as a trio, El Torito mainly just appeared in backstage comedy segments, before not appearing on TV any longer.

On May 6, 2016, after not making any appearances on WWE television in 2016, it was announced that El Torito had been released from his WWE contract, along with several other wrestlers.

=== Return to independent circuit (2016–present) ===
He has worked for various promotions under the ring name Mascarita Dorada and from 2025 as Mascarita Sagrada.

=== Return to WWE and AAA (2025–present) ===
He returned to WWE at the second Worlds Collide: Las Vegas event on September 12, 2025 as Mascarita Sagrada in a winning effort against the L.W.O., Lince Dorado and Mini Abismo Negro. The match featured La Parka, and the Aztec Warriors (Laredo Kid and Octagón Jr.) who he teamed with. He made another WWE appearance at Backlash on May 9, 2026 as Minihausen, teaming with Danhausen to defeat The Miz and Kit Wilson.

== Other media ==
Mascarita Dorada appeared in the motion picture Nacho Libre as one of the wrestling dwarves called "Los Duendes". He is credited as "El Duende #2". He also played himself in the animated film Scooby-Doo! and WWE: Curse of the Speed Demon

== Personal life ==
As Mascarita Dorada's real name is not known, very little is known about his personal life. He has two brothers who both also work as Mini-Estrellas. One brother works as Novillerto, a bullfighter character similar to that of Oscar Sevilla. His older brother works under the name Misteriocito (the mini version of Misterioso). Both Misterioso and Misteriocito have worked extensively in the Southern California area.

== Championships and accomplishments ==
- Asistencia Asesoría y Administración
  - AAA Mascot Tag Team Championship (1 time) – with Máscara Sagrada
  - LLL Mini-Estrellas Championship (1 time)
  - Mexican National Mini-Estrella Championship (2 times)
- Consejo Mundial de Lucha Libre
  - CMLL Mini-Estrella of the year: 2009
  - Pequeño Reyes del Aire (2008)
- DDT Pro-Wrestling
  - Ironman Heavymetalweight Championship (1 time)
- Micro Wrestling Federation
  - Micro Wrestling Championship (1 time)
- World Wrestling Association
  - WWA World Minis Championship (1 time)

== Luchas de Apuestas record ==
| Winner (wager) | Loser (wager) | Location | Event | Date | Notes |
|---|---|---|---|---|---|
| Mascarita Sagrada (mask) | Mascarita Maligna (mask) | Monterrey, Nuevo León | AAA show | April 6, 2003 | (Note: Steel cage match that also included Octagoncito, La Parkita, Mini Abismo Negro and Mini Psicosis.) |
| Mascarita Dorada (mask) | Sombrita (mask) | Puebla, Puebla | CMLL show | March 6, 2009 | (Note: Final two wrestlers in a 14-Minis Steel Cage Match.) (Note: The other wrestlers in the cage match were Asturiano, Bracito de Oro, Eléctrico, Fantasy, Pequeno Ninja, Pequeño Olímpico, Pequeño Black Warrior, Pierrothito, Sauron, Tzuki, Ultimó Dragoncito and Pequeño Universo 2000) |
| El Torito (mask) | Hornswoggle (hair) | Chicago, Illinois | Payback | June 1, 2014 | |
