= AAA Mascot Tag Team Championship =

Professional wrestling championship

AAA Mascot Tag Team Championship Campeón Mundial Mascota AAA
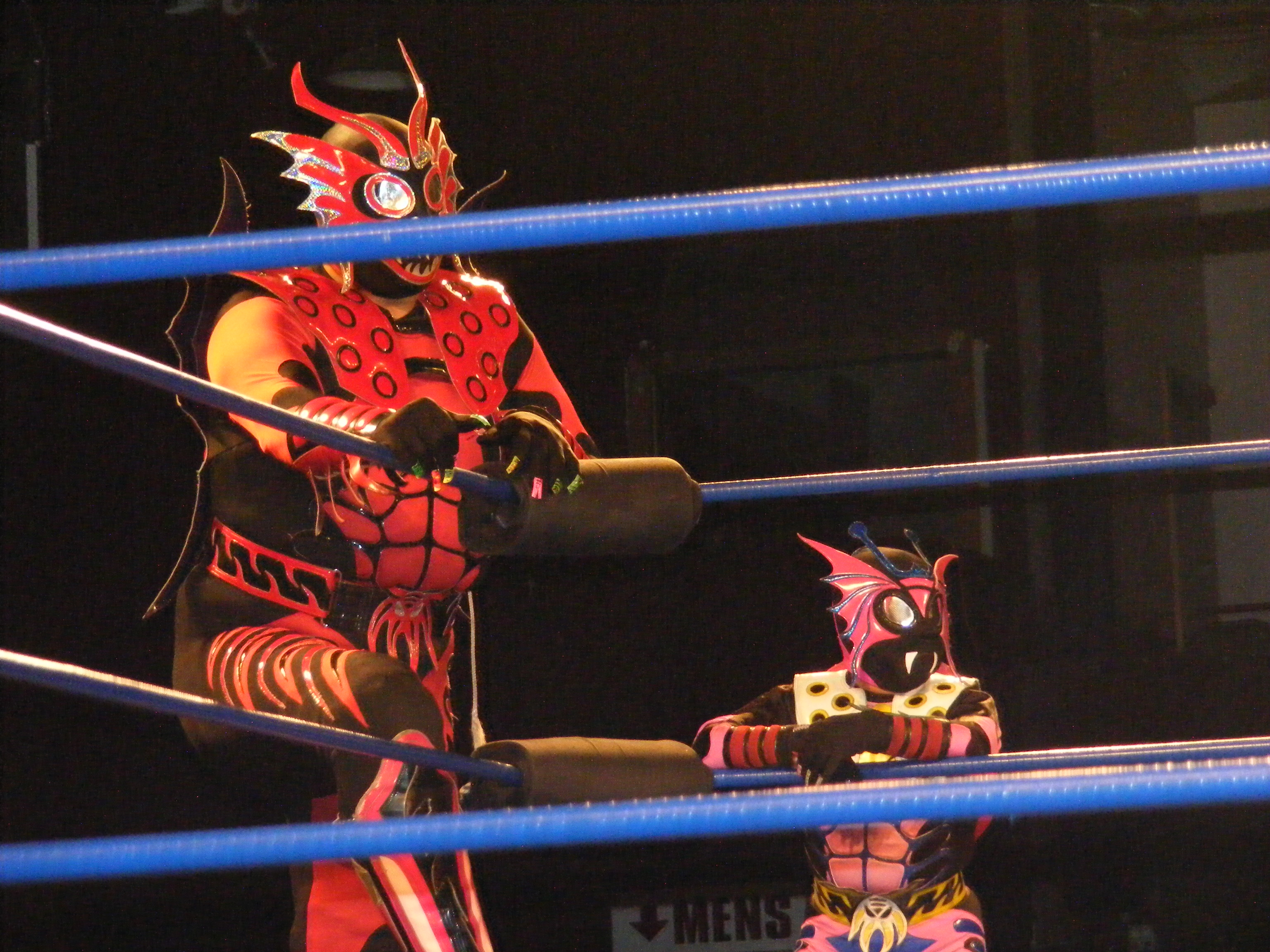
- The last Mascot Tag Team Champions El Alebrije (left) and Cuije (right)

Details
- Promotion: AAA
- Date established: 2002
- Date retired: 2011 or 2012
Statistics
- First champions: Abismo Negro and Mini Abismo Negro
- Final champions: El Pulpo and El Pulpito
- Longest reign: El Alebrije and Cuije (1,691 days)
- Shortest reign: Abismo Negro and Mini Abismo Negro (Less than one month)

The AAA Mascot Tag Team Championship (Campeón Mundial Mascota AAA in Spanish) is a tag team title contested for in the Mexican lucha libre promotion AAA. The title is for teams of a regular-sized wrestler and a second miniature version, or mascot, of himself. Being a professional wrestling championship, it is not won legitimately: it is instead won via a scripted ending to a match or awarded to a wrestler because of a storyline. The titles are currently vacant after previous champions, El Alebrije and Cuije, left the AAA promotion. The first championship team was Abismo Negro and Mini Abismo Negro, although it is not clear exactly how they won the title.

== Title history ==
Key
No.	Overall reign number
Reign	Reign number for the specific champion
Days	Number of days held
N/A	Unknown information
†	Championship change is unrecognized by the promotion

No.	Champion	Championship change			Reign statistics		Notes	Ref.
No.	Champion	Date	Event	Location	Reign	Days	Notes	Ref.
Lucha Libre AAA Worldwide (AAA)
1	Abismo Negro and Mini Abismo Negro	2002	AAA Live event	Unknown	1	(Note: The exact date on which Abismo Negro and Mini Abimo Negro won the title is unknown, which means that their title reign lasted more than one day.)	It is not documented who, if anyone, they defeated to become the champions.	
2	Máscara Sagrada and Mascarita Sagrada 2000	December 13, 2002	AAA Live event	Chilpancingo, Guerrero	1	616		
3	El Alebrije and Cuije	August 20, 2004	AAA Live event	Puebla, Puebla	1	1,691	Defeated Máscara Sagrada and Mascarita Sagrada 2000, The Monster and Chucky, and Psicosis and Mini Psicosis in a Four-Way match.	
†	El Pulpo and El Pulpito	November 23, 2011	Live event	Rio Bravo, Tamaulipas	—	N/A	Was not a AAA event. Title change not recognized by AAA.	
—	Deactivated	2011 or 2012	—	—	—	—	The title deactivated Sometime in 2011 after the win or sometime in 2012.	
