= Pierrothito =

Mexican professional wrestler (born 1967)

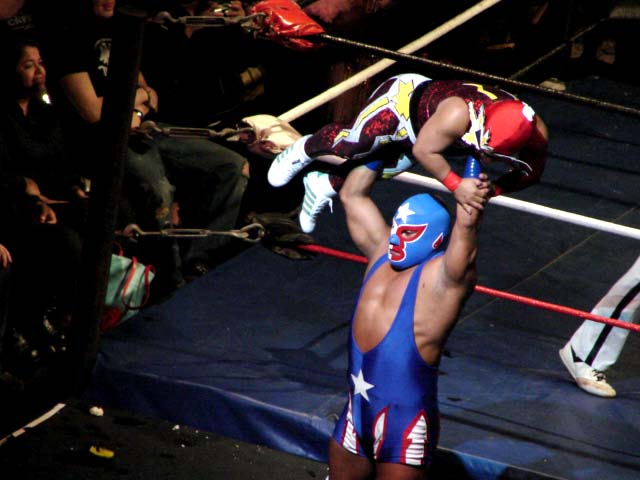
- Pierrothito lifting Tzuki up in the air

Personal information
- Born: October 2, 1967 (age 59) Mexico City, Mexico

Professional wrestling career
- Ring name(s): Mini Pierroth; Pierrothito; Pequeño Pierroth
- Billed height: 1.54 m (5 ft 1/2 in)
- Billed weight: 75 kg (165 lb)
- Trained by: Espectro Jr. Josè Luis Feliciano; Arturo Beristain
- Debut: July 31, 1991

Pierrothito (real name unrevealed; born October 2, 1967) is a Mexican professional wrestler. Pierrothito is a part of Consejo Mundial de Lucha Libre's (CMLL) Mini-Estrella, or "Mini", division and is a former CMLL World Mini-Estrella Champion. He is also the first Mini to have held the Mexican National Lightweight Championship. Pierrothito is Spanish for "Little Pierroth", alluding to the fact that he wrestles as a mini version of Pierroth, Jr.; he is sometimes billed as "Mini Pierroth" or "Pequeño Pierroth". Pierrothito's real name is not a matter of public record, as is often the case with masked wrestlers in Mexico where their private lives are kept a secret from the wrestling fans.

== Professional wrestling career ==
The man who would later wrestle as "Pierrothito" made his professional wrestling debut in on July 31, 1991. In 1992 Antonio Peña, head booker of Consejo Mundial de Lucha Libre (CMLL), left CMLL to form his own promotion, Asistencia Asesoría y Administración (AAA); Peña had been the mastermind behind the CMLL Mini-Estrella division and most of the Minis in CMLL decided to leave with Peña. The future Pierrothito was brought into CMLL to replenish the Mini division; he was given the ring persona of Pierrothito, a mini version of Pierroth, Jr. who worked in CMLL at the time. He has kept working as Pierrothito, even after Pierroth, Jr. himself left CMLL to join AAA. Working in the Mini division does not necessarily mean that he is a dwarf as several short wrestlers work in the "Mini" division. In the mid to late-1990s CMLL did not focus much on their Minis division, thus Pierrothito rarely made it onto CMLL's television shows. When Pierroth, Jr. returned to CMLL in the late 1990s, Pierrothito became a part of Pierroth, Jr. led group that was given a lot of TV time, thus giving Pierrothito more exposure than most of the Minis who were active at the time. On October 16, 2001, Pierrothito won the CMLL World Mini-Estrella Championship from Ultimo Dragoncito, capitalizing on the exposure he had gotten as part of Pierroth, Jr's group. After winning the Minis title Pierrothito held it for two years, making eight successful title defenses in that period On December 9, 2003, Pierrothito lost the title to Pequeño Olímpico and failed to regain it in subsequent title challenges. In 2008 Pierroth challenged then-champion Pequeño Damián 666 for the title but was unsuccessful once again. In September 2008 it was announced that CMLL was bringing the Mexican National Lightweight Championship back and that was now a title for Minis instead of the regular sized wrestlers it had previously been competed for. On September 9, 2009 Pierrothito won a Torneo cibernetico against 11 other wrestlers to earn a spot in the final. Pierroth outlasted Pequeño Lizmark, Pequeño Universo 2000, Mr. Aguilita, Bracito de Oro, Cosmico, Fire, Niño de Acero, Ultimo Dragoncito, Pequeño Damián 666, Pequeño Olímpico, and Shockercito. In the finals Pierroth defeated Mascarita Dorada to become the first "Mini" to hold the Mexican National Lightweight Championship. Pierroth was one of 14 Minis that risked their mask in a steel cage Luchas de Apuestas, or "bet fight", mach in the main event of CMLL's La Hora Cero pay-per-view on January 11, 2009. Pierrothito was one of the last two people in the cage, pinning Shockertito to unmask him. The other competitors were Mascarita Dorada, Ultimo Dragoncito, Pequeño Black Warrior, Pequeño Universo 2000, Pequeño Olímpico, Pequeño Damián 666, Tzuki, Nino de Acero, Pequeño Ninja, Fantasy, Electricom and Cosmico. On August 14, 2009, Pierrothito competed in his second Infierno en el Ring cage match of the year, a 15-man cage match that included both Minis and Puebla local wrestlers. Pierrothito defeated Mr. Rafaga to unmask him; other people in the match included Sauron; Asturiano, Blue Center, Espíritu Maligno, Mascarita Dorada, Fantasy, Pequeño Olímpico, Ultimo Dragoncito, Pequeño Universo 2000, Eléctrico, Bracito de Oro, Pequeño Black Warrior, and Pequeño Nitro. Following the mask win Pierrothito made his first trip to the United States, where he competed at two Chikara events on August 15 and 16, 2009. On the first night Pierrothito defeated Mascarita Dorada, only to have Mascara Dorada win on the second night. On November 6, 2012, 12 competitors met in a special steel cage match where the loser of the match would be forced to unmask or have his hair shaved completely off. During the match the wire mesh broke away from the steel frame, causing a lot of problems in the match, one of which saw Pierrothito bleeding so profusely that his mask was soaked by the time he climbed out of the cage to keep his mask safe.

=== Comando Caribeño ===
On May 9, 2013, CMLL introduced a new Comandante Pierroth, a character based on the original Pierroth, on which Pierrothito's character was based. The new Comandante Pierroth was announced as the leader of a new faction called La Comando Caribeño ("The Caribbean Commando") consisting of members of the original Pierroth's Los Boriquas, Pierrothito, Pequeño Violencia, La Comandante and added Zeuxis to the group as well. On July 24, CMLL declared the Mexican National Lightweight Championship vacant, ending Pierrothito's near five-year reign.

== Championships and accomplishments ==
- Consejo Mundial de Lucha Libre
  - CMLL World Mini-Estrella Championship (1 time)
  - Mexican National Lightweight Championship (1 time)
  - Copa Bobby Bonales 2024
- Guerreros Internacional
  - GI Middleweight Championship (1 time, current)
- Pro Wrestling Revolution
  - PWR World Minis Championship (1 time, current)

== Luchas de Apuestas record ==
Winner (wager)	Loser (wager)	Location	Event	Date	Notes
Pierrothito (mask)	El Pequeño Ídolo de Tampico (mask)	N/A	Live event	N/A	
Pierrothito (mask)	Mini Payaso (mask)	Unknown	Live event	N/A	
Pierrothito (mask)	El Torito (mask)	Puebla, Puebla	Live event	November 26, 2001	(Note: Relevos suicidas match; Lost to Tzuki and Ultimo Dragoncito and were forced to wrestle each other.)
Pierrothito (mask)	Shockercito (mask)	Mexico City	La Hora Cero	January 11, 2009	(Note: They were the last two competitors in a 14-Minis Infierno en el Ring match.)
Pierrothito (mask)	Mr. Rafaga (mask)	Puebla, Puebla	Live event	August 14, 2009	(Note: They were the last two competitors in a 15-man Infierno en el Ring match.)
Pierrothito (mask)	Bam Bam (hair)	Mexico City	Mini-Estrellas Torneo de Parejas Increibles	August 21, 2011	(Note: Finals of an eight team Relevos suicidas tournament.)
