= Demus 3:16 =

Mexican professional wrestler

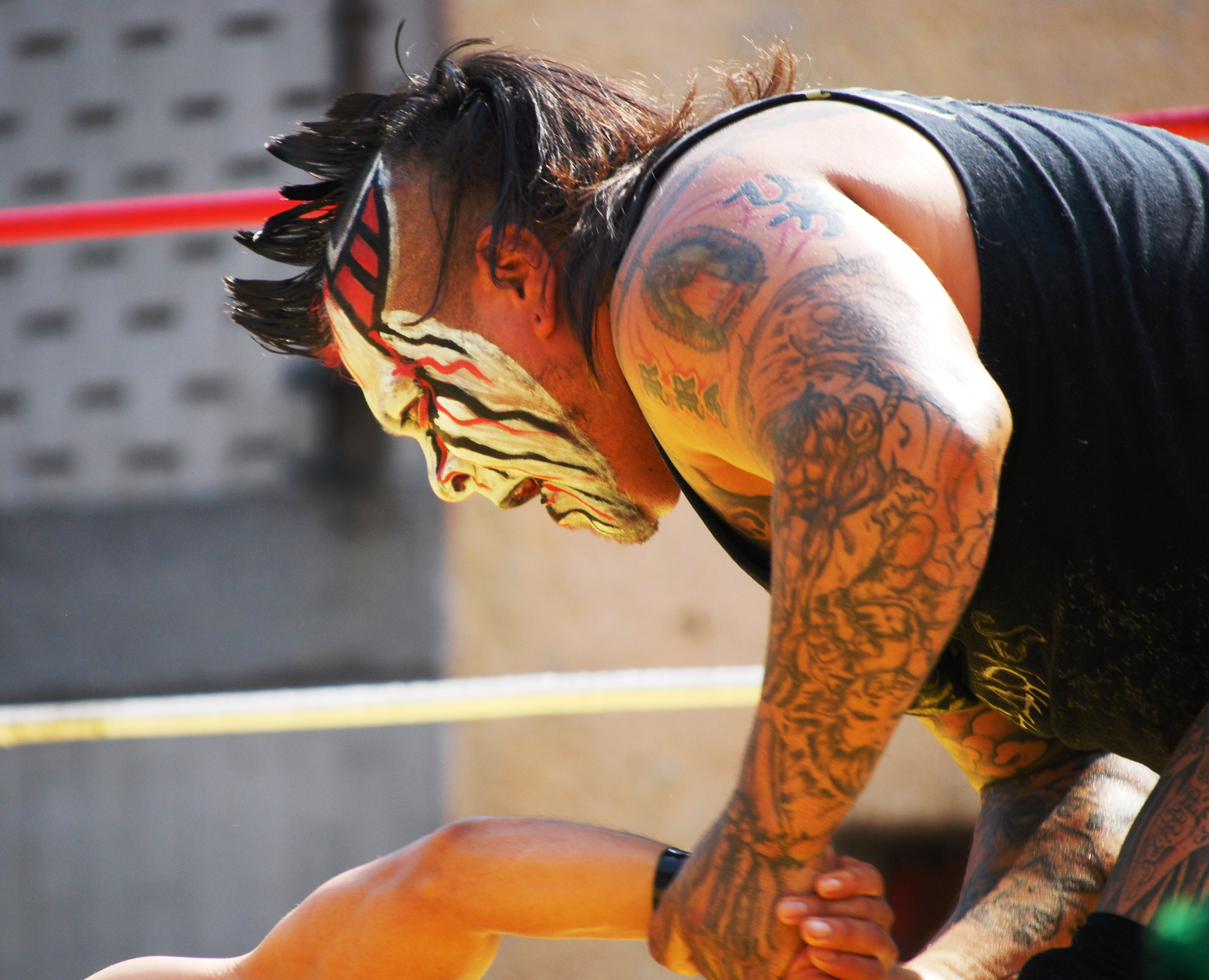
- Florencio as Pequeño Damián 666 in 2013

Personal information
- Born: José Luis Florencio Ramos; August 28, 1980 (age 46) Toluca, Mexico
- Spouse: Hiroka Yaginuma (wife)
- Relative: Akuma (brother)

Professional wrestling career
- Ring name(s): Demus; Demus 3:16; Mini Abismo Negro; Mini Eskeleto; Pequeño Damián 666; Troll
- Billed height: 1.60 m (5 ft 3 in)
- Billed weight: 80 kg (176 lb)
- Trained by: Rey Misterio, Sr. Fobia; Psicosis; El Satánico; Tony Salazar
- Debut: 1997

José Luis Florencio Ramos (born August 28, 1980) is a Mexican professional wrestler, best known under the ring names Pequeño Damián 666 and Demus. Florencio is a part of Consejo Mundial de Lucha Libre's (CMLL) Mini-Estrella, or "Mini". The Pequeño Damián 666 ring character is a Mini-version of wrestler Damián 666. In early June, 2010 he changed his ring name to Demus 3:16 as Damián 666 held the trademark to the name and would no longer allow him to use it.

== Professional wrestling career ==
=== Consejo Mundial de Lucha Libre ===
==== Pequeño Damian 666 (2004–2010) ====
Florencio made his professional wrestling debut in 1997 and quickly became a part of Consejo Mundial de Lucha Libre's (CMLL) Mini-Estrella, or "Mini", division; working in the Mini division does not necessarily mean that Serrano is a dwarf as several short wrestlers work in the "Mini" division. Initially he worked under the ring name Mini Eskeleto (Spanish for "Mini Skeleton") and later also worked as "Troll". In 2005 he began working under the name "Pequeño Damián 666" a Mini-version of wrestler Damián 666. He often teamed with Pequeño Halloween, just like Damían 666 teamed with Halloween and become a part of Los Perritos del Mal, a mini version of the group Los Perros del Mal, which both Damián 666 and Halloween were members off. Pequeño Damián 666 ended Pequeño Olímpico's almost four-year run with the CMLL World Mini-Estrella Championship on November 20, 2007. Following his title win Pequeño Damián 666 began working a storyline, or feud with Bam Bam, a storyline that saw Pequeño Damián 666 get shaved bald after losing a Luchas de Apuestas, or "bet match" to Bam Bam. the storyline between the two saw Bam Bam win the CMLL World Mini-Estrella Championship on July 27, 2008. Pequeño Damián 666 got a measure of revenge on August 17, 2008, when he won a Luchas de Apuesta match against Bam Bam, leaving his opponent shaved bald after the match. On June 2, 2009, Pequeño Damián 666 lost a Luchas de Apuetas match to Shockercito, losing his hair for the second time in his career.

==== Demus 3:16 (2010–2017) ====
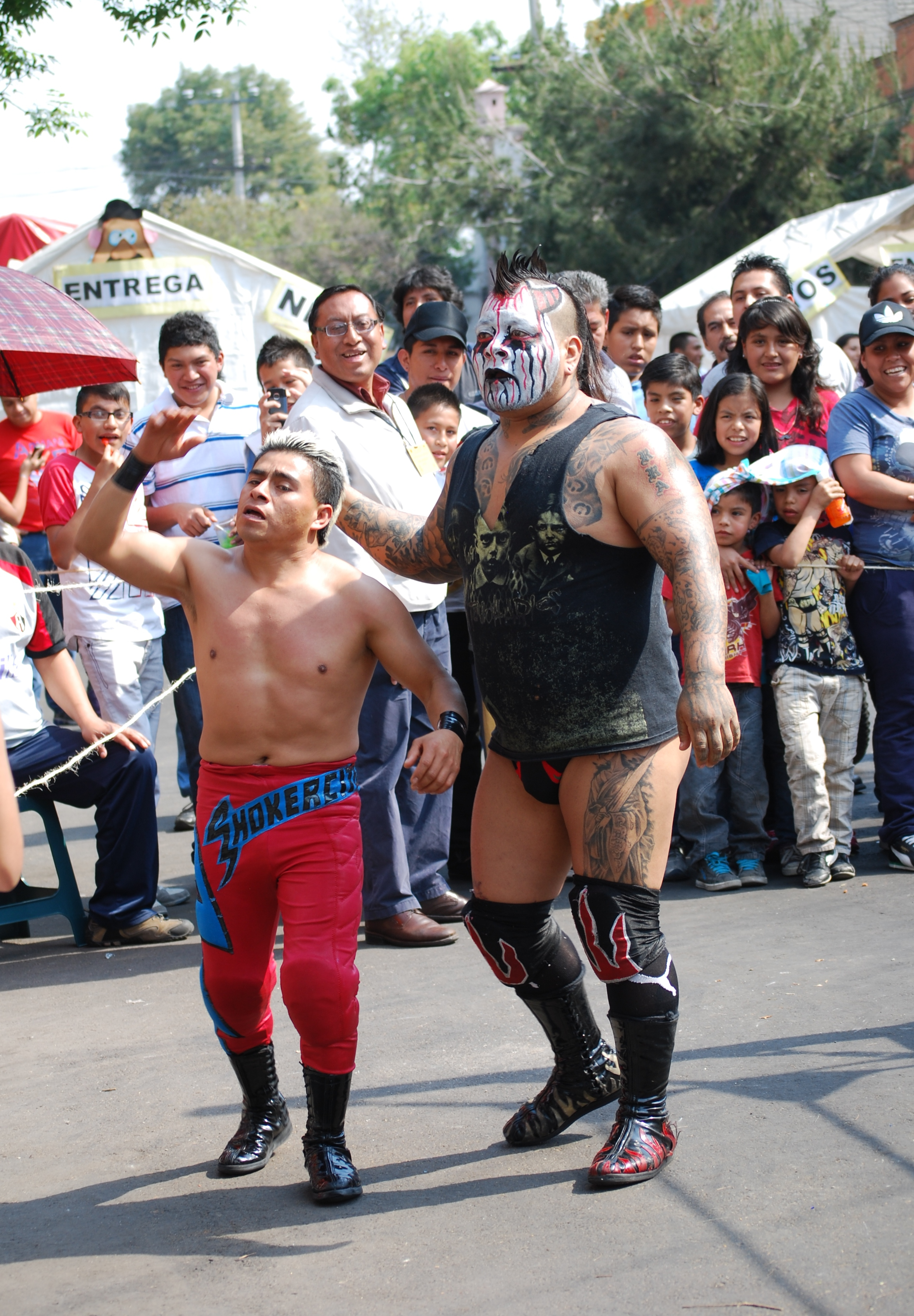
Pequeño Damián 666 with Shockercito at a community event in Colonia Doctores

In 2010 Damián 666 claimed that he owned the trademark to the name "Damián 666" and wanted Pequeño Damián 666 to stop using the name. While Pequeño Damián 666 originally claimed he was legally allowed to use the name he underwent a name change in June 2010 to "Demus 3:16". In June and July 2010 the feud between Bam Bam and Demus 3:16 heated up again with the two facing off in A third Lucha de Apuesta, hair vs. hair match on July 6 which Demus 3:16, potentially earning a shot at Bam Bam's Mini-Estrellas Championship. In August CMLL began a "Bicentennial tournament" specifically for the Mini-Estrella division, both to celebrate the 200th anniversary of Mexico as a nation and the 18th anniversary of CMLL's Mini-Estrella division. The prize of the tournament was an opportunity to leave the Mini-Estrellas division and work with the regular male wrestlers of CMLL. Demus 3:16 won the first of two torneo cibernetico elimination matches, outlasting Eléctrico, Saturno, Fantasy, Pequeño Olímpico, Pequeño Nitro, Pequeño Violencia and Cisne to earn a place in the finals. On August 24 Demus 3:16 defeated Pierrothito in the finals of the tournament to earn his way out of the Mini-Estrella division. Demus 3:16 lost his hair for the third time in his career on March 11, 2011, when he was defeated by Virus. As a result, Demus 3:16 was also forced to return to the Mini-Estrella division. On September 18, Demus 3:16 defeated Pequeño Warrior in another Hair vs. Hair match. On January 29, 2012, Demus 3:16 made an appearance for Southern California–based Pro Wrestling Guerrilla (PWG), teaming with Joey Ryan, Peter Avalon and Ray Rosas in an eight-person tag team match, where they were defeated by B-Boy, Candice LeRae, Cedric Alexander and Mascarita Dorada. On November 6, 2012, 12 competitors met in a special steel cage match where the loser of the match would be forced to unmask or have his hair shaved completely off. During the match Demus 3:16 was repeatedly thrown off the top of the cage inside the ring and tossed into the cage. While he was able to escape the cage he did need immediate medical attention afterwards as he was unable to stand under his own power. On April 14, 2017, Serrano left CMLL.

=== Global Force Wrestling (2017) ===
On July 3, 2017, Demus made his debut for American Global Force Wrestling.

== Personal life ==
Florencio is married to professional wrestler Hiroka Yaginuma who works for CMLL under the ring name "Hiroka". In early June, 2010 Hiroka announced that she was retiring from wrestling for a few years in order to start a family. Florencio's fourteen year younger brother made his professional wrestling debut in 2012, working under the ring name Akuma 3:16.

== Championships and accomplishments ==
- DDT Pro-Wrestling
  - KO-D 10-Man Tag Team Championship (1 time, current) – with Daisuke Sasaki, Hideki Okatani, MJ Paul and Ilusion
- Consejo Mundial de Lucha Libre
  - CMLL World Mini-Estrella Championship (1 time)
  - Pequeños Reyes del Aire (2007)
  - Torneo Bicentenario de Minis (2010)
  - CMLL Bodybuilding Contest (2006, 2007 - Minis)
  - Copa Herdez (2009)
- POR Wrestling
  - POR Cruiserweight Championship (1 time, current)

== Luchas de Apuestas record ==
Winner (wager)	Loser (wager)	Location	Event	Date	Notes
Bam Bam (hair)	Pequeño Damián 666 (hair)	Mexico City, Mexico	Live event	July 24, 2007	
Pequeño Damián 666 (hair)	Toshiya Matsuzaki (hair)	Mexico City, Mexico	DragonMania III	May 11, 2008	
Pequeño Damián 666 (hair)	Bam Bam (hair)	Mexico City, Mexico	Live event	August 17, 2008	
Shockercito (hair)	Pequeño Damián 666 (hair)	Mexico City, Mexico	Live event	June 2, 2009	
Pequeño Damián 666 (hair)	Yaruba (hair)	Mexico City, Mexico	DragonMania V	May 29, 2010	
Demus 3:16 (hair)	Bam Bam (hair)	Mexico City, Mexico	Live event	July 6, 2010	
Virus (hair, leadership (Note: If he lost Demus 3:16 would become leader of Los Cancerberos.))	Demus 3:16 (hair, division (Note: If Demus lost he would return to the Mini-Estrellas division.))	Mexico City, Mexico	Live event	March 11, 2011	
Demus 3:16 (hair)	Pequeño Black Warrior (hair)	Mexico City, Mexico	Live event	September 18, 2011	
Shockercito (hair)	Demus 3:16 (hair)	Mexico City, Mexico	Live event	October 16, 2015	
Wotan (hair)	Demus 3:16 (beard)	Irapuato, Guanajuato, Mexico	Live event	December 18, 2017	
Demus (hair)	Dragoncito de Oro (mask)	Tlalnepantla, State of Mexico	Lucha Libre Boom show	October 7, 2018	(Note: This was a nine-Mini Estrella steel cage match that also included Mini Pinochito, Pequeño Aníbal, Caramelito, Súper Loco, Mini Rey Misterio, Pentagoncito and Mini Difunto.)
Demus (hair)	Gato de Ecatepec (mask)	Coacalco	Lucha Memes Chairo Kingdom	March 31, 2019	
Demus (hair)	Mike Segura	Xalapa	Live event	May 3, 2019	(Note: Steel cage match)
