= Fire (wrestler) =

Mexican professional wrestler

Personal information
- Born: Vicente Serrano; 1973 (age 52–53)

Professional wrestling career
- Ring name(s): Fire; MSin censura
- Billed height: 1.69 m (5 ft 6 1/2 in)
- Billed weight: 68 kg (150 lb)
- Debut: 1992

Vicente Serrano (born 1973) is a Mexican professional wrestler, best known under the ring name "Fire", a Mini-Estrella, or "Mini". Since his debut in 1992 Serrano has worked mainly for Consejo Mundial de Lucha Libre (CMLL), in their Minis division, having held the CMLL World Mini-Estrella Championship in 1995/1996. Serrano has previously worked as Mascarita Mágica (Spanish for "Little Magic Mask"), a miniature version of the original Máscara Mágica.

== Professional wrestling career ==
Serrano made his professional wrestling debut in 1992, signing with Consejo Mundial de Lucha Libre (CMLL) not long after his debut. In 1992 then-CMLL booker Antonio Peña left CMLL to form his own promotion, Asistencia Asesoría y Administración (AAA); Peña had been the mastermind behind the CMLL Minis division and most of the Minis in CMLL decided to leave with Peña. Serrano and a number of other wrestlers were brought in to replenish the division. Working in the Mini division does not necessarily mean that Serrano is a dwarf as several short wrestlers work in the "Mini" division. Serrano was given the ring persona of Mascarita Mágica (Spanish for "Little Magic Mask"), an enmascarado, or masked, miniature version of the original Máscara Mágica. When the original Máscara Mágica left CMLL and the company introduced Máscara Mágica II, Serrano's mask and tights were changed to look like the new version. On February 13, 1995 Mascarita Mágica defeated Ultratumbita to win the CMLL World Mini-Estrella Championship. In April, 1995 Mágica lost a Lucha de Apuesta, or "bet match" to Ultratumbita as part of their storyline and was forced to unmask. On February 27, 1996 Mascarita Mágica lost the Minis title to Damiancito El Guerrero. In the mid to late-1990s CMLL did not focus much on their Minis division, their rarely made it onto their television shows. Due to various injuries Serrano's wrestling style had to be modified, toning down the high risk flying moves, the change in wrestling style accompanied a change in "attitude" as Serrano was turned from being a técnico (term used in Mexico to refer to face or "good guy" character) to a rudo (heel or bad guy character) called "Fire". Working as a Rudo allowed Serrano to control the match more and work a more grounded style than as a técnico. As Fire Serrano incorporated actual fire in his entrance, including a trick where it looks like his hands are lit on fire. He also incorporated the use of the fireball as an illegal weapon, achieved by the use of Flash paper, making it look dangerous but not harming anyone. On October 27, 2008 Serrano lost the "Fire" mask, losing a Luchas de Apuesta to Último Dragoncito. Serrano has only made limited appearances since losing his mask, most notably to lose another Luchas de Apuesta to Shockercito where his hair was on the line.

== Championships and accomplishments ==
- Consejo Mundial de Lucha Libre
  - CMLL World Mini-Estrella Championship (1 time)

== Luchas de Apuestas record ==
| Winner (wager) | Loser (wager) | Location | Event | Date | Notes |
|---|---|---|---|---|---|
| Ultratumbita (mask) | Mascarita Mágica (mask) | Mexico City | CMLL live event | N/A | |
| Damiancito El Guerrero (hair) | Mascarita Mágica (hair) | Mexico City | CMLL live event | N/A | |
| Mascarita Mágica (hair) | Toro Bill (hair) | Puebla, Puebla | CMLL live event | N/A | |
| Mascarita Mágica (hair) | Vaquerito (hair) | Mexico City | CMLL live event | N/A | |
| Último Dragoncito (mask) | Fire (mask) | Puebla, Puebla | CMLL live event | October 27, 2008 | |
| Shockercito (hair) | Fire (hair) | Mexico City | CMLL live event | April 1, 2009 | |
