= Mini-Estrella =

Professional wrestling genre

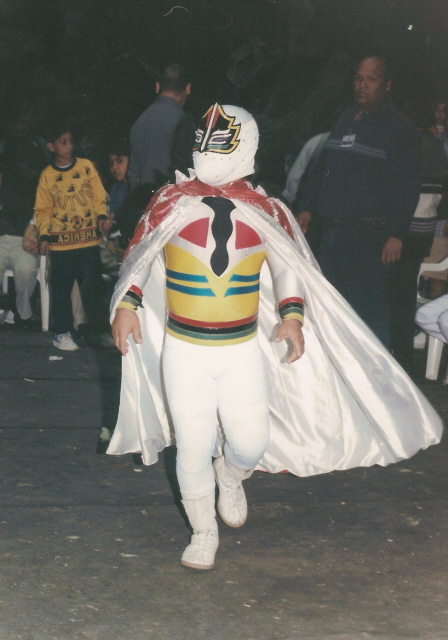
Mascarita Sagrada, one of the first Mini-Estrellas

The term Mini-Estrella (Spanish for "Mini-Star") is used in Mexico to describe a division of short professional wrestlers, some of whom have dwarfism. The Mexican Mini-Estrellas are comparable to midget wrestlers who compete internationally, but with the notable exception that some of the Mini-Estrellas do not have dwarfism but are simply short. Some Mini-Estrellas have later on moved on to work as regular sized competitors. The Mini-Estrellas have been featured in several promotions outside Mexico, most notably WWE and Total Nonstop Action Wrestling (TNA).

Originally the height limit for the Minis division as set by Mexican wrestling commissions was 1.53 m (5 ft 0 in) but in recent years wrestlers such as Pequeño Olímpico have worked the Minis division despite being as much as 1.59 m (5 ft 2 1/2 in) tall. In the formative years of Mini-Estrella wrestling, the Mini-Estrellas were also referred to as "Micro Wrestlers", a term which has since been revived in the form of the Micro-Estrellas division, exclusively consisting of Mascota wrestlers with dwarfism (with most heights in the 3-4ft range).

== History ==
The origins of the Mini-Estrella division lies in midget wrestling, which in Mexico was popularized in the 1970s when promoters used the American concept and had a number of Mexican little people perform as a "special attraction" on professional wrestling shows. In the early days saw the popularity of wrestlers such as Gran Nikolai, Pequeno Goliath and Arturito (inspired by R2-D2), especially with the children. By the 1980s midget wrestling was less popular in Mexico, especially since few new wrestlers had joined the division.

In the early 1990s Consejo Mundial de Lucha Libre (CMLL), Mexico's oldest wrestling promotion, created a new concept, the Mini-Estrella division. The division was created by Antonio Peña who worked for CMLL at the time, who came up with the idea of using both little people and short wrestlers together and to have the Mini-Estrellas work as smaller versions of popular wrestlers of the time. Peña and CMLL created the CMLL World Mini-Estrella Championship in 1992, which is considered the official birth of the division. CMLL's Mini-Estrellas division featured a number of skilled, high flying wrestlers which helped make the concept an immediate success. Original Mini-Estrellas division consisted of Mascarita Sagrada (the first CMLL Mini-Estrella champion), Aguilita Solitaria, Octagoncito, Espectrito, Mazakrito, Pierrothito, Pequeño Tritón, Mascarita Mágica, Ultimo Dragoncito, Cicloncito Ramírez, Pequeño Jaque Mate, Platita and Gargolita.

In 1993 Peña decided to leave CMLL and create his own professional wrestling promotion, Asistencia Asesoría y Administración (AAA), and in the process a number of the Mini-Estrellas left with Peña. Among those that left CMLL were the division's two main stars, the champion Mascarita Sagrada and his rival Espectrito. Peña later created the Mexican National Mini-Estrella Championship as AAA's Mini-Estrella championship. Due to the success of both the CMLL and AAA Mini-Estrella division other promotions such as the Universal Wrestling Association and the World Wrestling Association (WWA) briefly promoted Mini-Estrella divisions, but neither promotion gained the success of CMLL and AAA. AAA would later promote two other Mini-Estrella championships, the IWC and the LLL Mini-Estrellas championships, but both were later abandoned. The success of the Mini-Estrella division was evident as AAA put them in the main event of Triplemanía III-A, one of AAA's biggest shows of the years. The match was a 13-Minis Steel Cage Elimination match, Lucha de Apuesta, "Mask vs. Mask" match. In the end Payasito Rojo was the last man in the cage after Bandita, Espectrito, Espectrito II, Jerrito Estrada, Fuercita Guerrera, Mascarita Sagrada, Mini Calo, Octagóncito, La Parkita, Payasito Azul, Super Muñequito, and Torerito had all left the cage. The Triplemanía match was one of the first ever Luchas de Apuestas matches in the Mini-Estrella division. AAA would later create another "first" in the Mini-Estrellas division as they created Los Mini Vipers, a Mini version of the Los Vipers stable.

In 2002 AAA created the AAA Mascot Tag Team Championship, the first and so far only tag team championship for teams consisting of a Mini-Estrella and the regular sized wrestler he is based on. In 2007, then reigning Mexican National Mini-Estrellas Champion, Mascarita Sagrada 2000 left AAA while still holding the championship; he later appeared in CMLL, repackaged as "Mascarita Dorada" but the announcers still mentioned the fact that he was the Mexican National Mini-Estrella Champion. Since his initial appearance as Mascarita Dorada the Mexican National Mini-Estrellas Championship has not been mentioned and is considered inactive. Following the loss of the Mexican National title AAA decided to create a new title, the AAA World Mini-Estrellas Championship as the centerpiece of their Mini-Estrellas division, won by Mini Charly Manson. On January 11, 2009, CMLL promoted their first pay-per-view (PPV) show with the Minis division in the main event. At La Hora Cero 13 minis competed in CMLL's first ever Infierno en el Ring for Mini-Estrellas. The match saw Pierrothito defeat and unmask Shockercito after Cosmico, Eléctrico, Niño de Acero, Fantasy, Mascarita Dorada, Pequeño Ninja, Pequeno Olimpico, Pequeño Warrior, Tzuki, Ultimo Dragoncito and Pequeño Universo 2000 all had escaped the cage. Later on in 2009 CMLL would hold another "all Minis" cage match as well as a match that saw Minis and regular sized wrestlers compete against each other. AAA's Mascota tag team title was abandoned in 2009 when the then reigning champions El Alebrije and Cuije left AAA.

== Mini-Estrellas outside Mexico ==
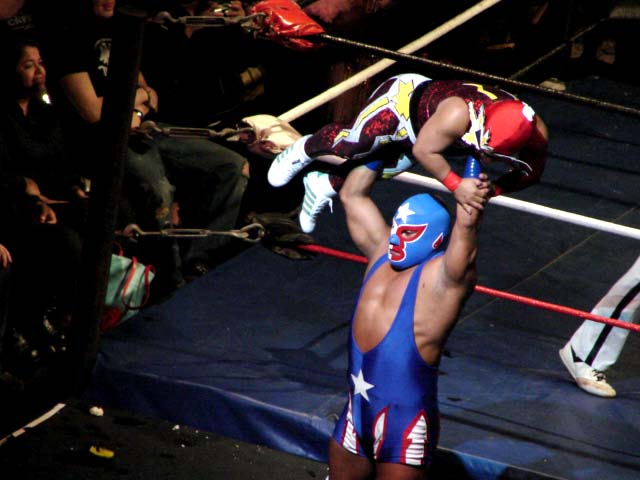
Pierrothito lifting Tzuki during a match in the United States

The Mini-Estrellas have not been restricted to working outside Mexico, although Mexico is the only country to regularly promote the Mini-Estrellas as a specific division. Often the Mini-Estrellas are brought in for a "special attraction" match such the World Wrestling Council's 19th and 22nd anniversary shows that featured Mascarita Sagrada and other Minis. World Championship Wrestling (WCW) also invited the Mini-Estrellas to appear on one of their shows, a pre-PPV match at the 1996 Starrcade where Mascarita Sagrada and Octagóncito defeated Jerrito Estrada and Piratita Morgan. Northern California based Pro Wrestling Revolution (PWR) is the only US based promotion to have created a specific Mini-Estrella championship, created in 2009.

In 1997 the World Wrestling Federation (WWF, later WWE) and AAA began a talent sharing program, which allowed several Mini-Estrellas wrestlers to compete on WWF television. These wrestlers included Mascarita Sagrada, La Parkita and several AAA Mini-Estrellas that were given new gimmicks for their WWF appearances including Max Mini (formerly Máscarita Sagrada Jr.), El Torito (Espectrito), Mini Goldust (Mini Karis La Momia) and Mini Vader (Piratita Morgan). Mascarita Sagrada originally wrestled under his normal name but was soon repackaged as "Mini Nova", a mini version of Super Nova, a luchador that worked for the WWF at the time. Mini Nova made his in-ring debut in a match at Bad Blood in 1997 where he teamed with Max Mini against Tarantula and Mosaic. The Minis appeared on WWF Shotgun Saturday Night and WWF Monday Night Raw as well as in matches at the Royal Rumble in 1997 and the Royal Rumble in 1998. In 1999 the WWF/AAA talent sharing agreement ended and all Mini-Estrellas stopped working in the United States. In October 2005 WWE created a "Juniors division" exclusive to their SmackDown! brand. The division featured a number of Minis from Mexico that mainly appeared in backstage skits of a comedic nature but would also occasionally wrestle. The Juniors division included Mascarita Sagrada, Tzuki, Octagoncito and Pequeño Violencia; the division also included Super Porky, who had never worked in the Mini-Estrella division in Mexico. Super Porky only appeared in backstage skits but did not wrestle. By March 2006 WWE gave up on the Juniors division and released all the Minis.

The US-based Lucha Libre USA began promoting in 2010 and featured several Mini-Estrellas, unlike in Mexican promotions, Mini-Estrellas such as Mascarita Dorada and Pequeño Halloween compete against regular sized competitors instead of in a separate division.

== From Mini-Estrella to regular competitors ==
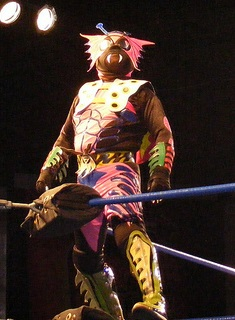
Cuije held the AAA Mascot Tag Team Championship with El Alebrije.

Since the Mini-Estrella division is not restricted only to people with Dwarfism some wrestlers have moved on from the Mini-Estrellas division to the regular sized division, especially some of the competitors over the 1.53 m (5 ft 0 in) height limit the division originally had. Mike Segura originally worked as Orito (a mini version of Oro) in CMLL, but when he began working for AAA he began working in the regular sized division as Super Nova. Similarly Felinito wrestled in CMLL as a mini but when jumped to AAA he began wrestling in the regular sized division as Mach 1. Freelance became a regular sized wrestler after losing his mask as Panterita.

In late 1997 CMLL booked an eight-man torneo cibernetico elimination match where the winner would earn the right to work in the "regular sized" division. Damiancito El Guerrero defeated Cicloncito Ramírez, Tritoncito, Pequeño Cochisse, Platita, Guerrerito del Futuro, Pequeño Sayama and Fierito to earn the right to work with "regular sized" wrestlers. In early 1998 he made his debut as part of the regular sized division under the name "Virus", no mention was made that Virus used to work as Damiancito El Guerrero or the fact that he still held the CMLL World Mini-Estrella Championship. By 1999 CMLL decided that it was time to crown a new CMLL World Mini-Estrella Champion as Virus was still technically the champion despite not having worked as a Mini-Estrella for over a year. Instead of making Virus return to the Minis division to lose the title CMLL decided to give the championship to Ultimo Dragoncito and then subsequently announce that Ultimo Dragoncito had "won" the title on an undisclosed day in October 1999.

CMLL held a "Bicentennial tournament" in August 2010 to commemorate the 18th anniversary of the Mini-Estrellas division, with the winner "graduating" to the regular sized division. The tournament consisted of two torneo cibernetico elimination matches with the winner of each facing off in a singles match on August 24. Demus 3:16 won the first cibernetico, defeating Eléctrico, Saturno, Fantasy, Pequeño Olímpico, Pequeño Nitro, Pequeño Violencia and Cisne to earn a place in the finals. The second torneo cibernetico took place on August 17, 2010, and was won by Pierrothito. On August 24, 2010, Demus 3:16 defeated Pierrothito in the finals of the tournament to earn his way out of the Mini-Estrella division. In March 2011, Demus 3:16 wrestled Virus in a hair vs. hair mask. Demus 3:16 lost the match and after that he returned to the minis division.

== Micro-Estrellas ==
Mini-Estrellas with dwarfism - such as Mascarita Dorada - typically have less-pronounced forms of it, that still retain the proportions & range-of-movement of most wrestlers. Thus allowing for a wider range of opponents they can feasibly interact with in a wrestling match context. Luchadores with forms of dwarfism more reminiscent of traditional "midget wrestling" predominantly work as mascotas - unique characters (rarely if-ever based on a larger luchador) who accompany teams from the main men's division to the ring for their matches & perform crowd-pleasing antics between the falls. This practice was popularized by the original KeMonito, during his earlier days seconding Tinieblas as "Alushe".

In 2017, CMLL spent a month promoting an all-mascotas tag team match for their annual Sunday Children's Day show on April 30, featuring the debut on KeMonito's son Microman. This developed into a full division with matches throughout the year, dubbed the Micro-Estrellas. Microman and Chamuel would feature in the first Lucha de Apuestas between such performers to take place on a CMLL Aniversario card in 2019, which would be followed 3 months later with the introduction of an official CMLL World Micro-Estrellas Championship.

== Wrestling style ==
Since Mini-Estrella wrestlers are smaller and possess less muscle bulk than heavyweights or even cruiserweights it lends to a high-flying wrestling style for a number of the Mini-Estrellas, especially in recent years. Some wrestlers such as Mascarita Dorada are able to perform moves that his regular sized counterpart would have a hard time executing. Not all performers in the Mini-Estrella division are able to work a high flying style, especially those with more severe forms of dwarfism work a more grounded style.

Although high-flying moves are still encouraged & appreciated from Micro-Estrellas, their physical stature is understandably more restrictive. As such, the style of their matches is more prone to skew towards comedy, emphasizing the novelty of seeing such individuals fight.

== Championships ==
The first Mini-Estrellas championship was created in 1992 when CMLL created the CMLL Mini-Estrellas World Championship. Since then rivals AAA and WWA both created a Mini-Estrellas championship, although only AAA's championship sustained any longevity. In 2008 CMLL decided to use the Mexican National Lightweight Championship as a secondary title for the Mini-Estrellas division. Up until that point the Lightweight title had not been considered a Mini-Estrellas championship.

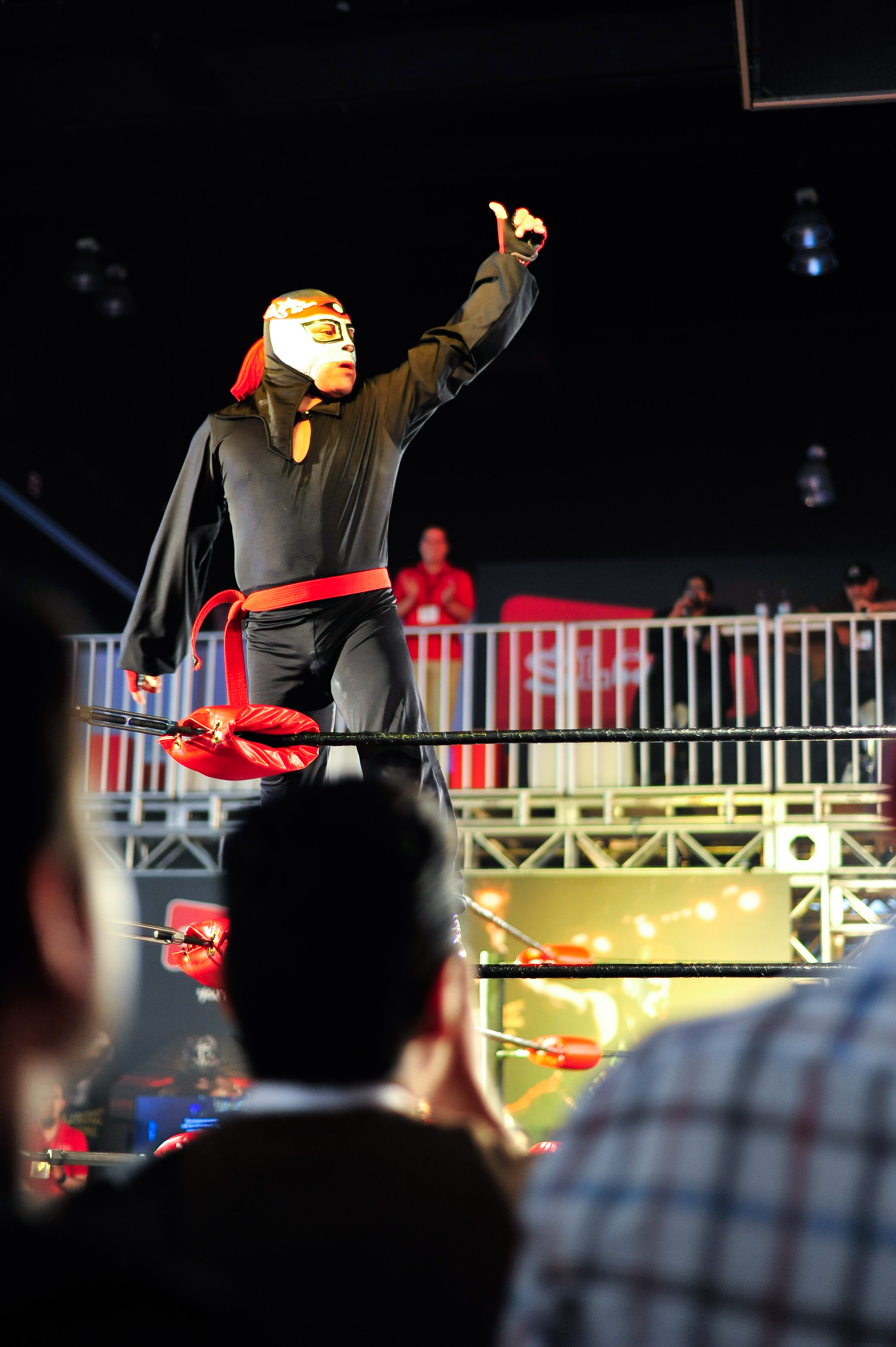
Octagoncito, a former AAA World Mini-Estrella Champion

Active championships

- AAA World Mini-Estrellas Championship
- CMLL World Mini-Estrella Championship
  - CMLL World Micro-Estrellas Championship
- PWR World Mini's Championship
- Mexican National Lightweight Championship

Inactive championships

- WWA World Minis Championship
- IWC World Minis Championship
- LLL Mini-Estrellas Championship
- Mexican National Mini-Estrella Championship
- AAA Mascot Tag Team Championship

== See also ==
- Professional wrestling in Mexico
- Lucha Libre
- Midget wrestling
