= Pequeño Olímpico =

Mexican professional wrestler

Personal information
- Family: Infinito (son)

Professional wrestling career
- Ring name(s): Cicloncito Ramírez; Pequeño Gangster; Pequeño Olímpico
- Billed height: 1.59 m (5 ft 2 1/2 in)
- Billed weight: 60 kg (130 lb)
- Trained by: Hijo del Gladiador; Chico Hernandez; Panchito Villalobos; Jose Luis Feliciano
- Debut: August 23, 1992

Andrés Muñoz Andrade (born July 15, 1971) is a Mexican professional wrestler, who is best known for wrestling under the name of Pequeño Olímpico. He previously wrestled as a masked wrestler character, before his defeat to Angelito in a Luchas de apuestas, mask vs. mask match at Homenaje a Dos Leyendas 2024. Pequeño Olímpico is a part of Consejo Mundial de Lucha Libre's (CMLL) Mini-Estrella division and holds the record for the longest CMLL World Mini-Estrella Championship reign, with 1,442 days. He has held the title twice. Pequeño Olímpico is Spanish for "Little Olympian", alluding to the fact that he wrestles as a mini version of Olímpico. He previously worked as Cicloncito Ramírez, a mini version of Ciclón Ramirez.

== Professional wrestling career ==
Andrés Muñoz Andrade initially wrestled under the name of Pequeño Gangster. He made his major debut in 1992, that same year Antonio Peña, head booker of Consejo Mundial de Lucha Libre (CMLL), left CMLL to form his own promotion, Asistencia Asesoría y Administración (AAA); Peña had been the mastermind behind the CMLL Minis division and most of the Minis in CMLL decided to leave with Peña. Muñoz was brought into CMLL to replenish the Mini division. He was given the ring persona of Cicloncito Ramírez, a mini version of Ciclón Ramirez who worked in CMLL at the time. He kept working as Cicloncito Ramírez even after the man he was based on left CMLL. Working in the Mini division does not necessarily mean that he is a dwarf as several short wrestlers work in the "Mini" division. In the mid to late-1990s CMLL did not focus much on their Minis division, thus Ciclocito Ramirez rarely made it onto CMLL's television shows. In 2002, years after Ciclón Ramírez had left CMLL, it was decided to repackage him as "Pequeño Olímpico", a mini of a popular Tecnico (Face or "good guy") Olímpico. About a year after becoming Pequeño Olímpico he defeated Pierrothito to win the CMLL World Mini-Estrella Championship on December 9, 2003. Pequeño Olímpico successfully defended the title against former champion Pierrotito, Pequeño Violencia, Toro Bill, Gitanito, and had three defenses against Pequeño Damián 666. On November 20, 2007, Pequeño Olímpico lost the title to Pequeño Damián 666, ending his title reign after 1,442 days, the longest reign of any Mini's champion. Pequeño Olímpico remains one of CMLL's main "tecnico" Minis as the Mini division has gotten more air time and promotional focus in the last couple of years. Pequeño Olímpico was one of 13 Minis that risked their mask in a Steel Cage Luchas de Apuestas match in the main event of CMLL's La Hora Cero pay-per-view on January 11, 2009. Pequeño Olímpico was the 7th wrestler to escape the cage to save his mask. In August CMLL began a "Bicentennial tournament" specifically for the Mini-Estrella division, both to celebrate the 200th anniversary of Mexico as a nation and the 18th anniversary of CMLL's Mini-Estrella division. The prize of the tournament was an opportunity to leave the Mini-Estrellas division and work with the regular male wrestlers of CMLL. Pequeño Olímpico was part of the first of two torneo cibernetico elimination matches but did not qualify for the finals. On February 13, 2011, Olímpico regained the Mini-Estrella Championship from Bam Bam. On November 6, 2012, 12 competitors met in a special steel cage match where the loser of the match would be forced to unmask or have his hair shaved completely off. During Pequeño Olímpico's attempt to climb out of the cage the wire mesh broke lose from the metal frame, trapping Pequeño Olímpico's arm in it. He needed help from ringside officials to safely untangle himself and climb down. Following the escape Pequeño Olímpico was immediately taken to the back to have his arm checked out. On September 7, 2014, Pequeño Olímpico lost the CMLL World Mini-Estrella Championship to Astral, ending his three-and-a-half-year reign.

On March 29, 2024, at Homenaje a Dos Leyendas 2024, Pequeño Olímpico competed in the Mask Quadrangular match, where he lost to Angelito, and as a result, he was forced to unmask and revealed his real name.

== Championships and accomplishments ==
- Consejo Mundial de Lucha Libre
  - CMLL World Mini-Estrella Championship (2 times)
  - CMLL Bodybuilding Contest – Minis (2011)
  - Pequeño Reyes del Aire (2011)
  - Copa Bobby Bonales 2025

== Luchas de Apuestas record ==
| Winner (wager) | Loser (wager) | Location | Event | Date | Notes |
|---|---|---|---|---|---|
| Cicloncito Ramirez (mask) | Payasito I (mask) | Leon, Guanajuato | Live event | N/A | (Note: This was the finals of a Ruleta de la Muerte tournament.) |
| Pequeño Olímpico (mask) | Pequeño Violencia (mask) | Mexico City | Live event | April 30, 2003 | |
| Pequeño Olímpico (mask) | Gitanito (mask) | State of Mexico | Live event | November 15, 2007 | |
| Pequeño Olímpico (mask) | Último Dragoncito (mask) | Mexico City | Live event | July 29, 2022 | |
| Angelito (mask) | Pequeño Olímpico (mask) | Mexico City | Homenaje a Dos Leyendas | March 29, 2024 | (Note: Final two of a four-way elimination match also involving Pierrothito and Acero.) |
