= Bam Bam (wrestler) =

Mexican professional wrestler

Personal information
- Born: Jesús Guillermo Anaya Cortés; November 22, 1985 (age 40) Mexico City, Mexico

Professional wrestling career
- Ring name: Bam Bam
- Billed height: 1.63 m (5 ft 4 in)
- Billed weight: 69 kg (152 lb)
- Trained by: Popitekus, Jr. Arturo Beristain; José Luis Feliciano
- Debut: December 11, 2002

Jesús Guillermo Anaya Cortés is a Mexican professional wrestler, best known by his ring name Bam Bam, a Mini-Estrella, or "Mini" wrestler. Anaya made his professional wrestling debut in 2002 and has worked mainly for the promotion Consejo Mundial de Lucha Libre (CMLL), where he is a former CMLL World Mini-Estrella Champion. He is the son of professional wrestler Popitekus, Jr. who also helped train him for his pro wrestling career.

== Professional wrestling career ==
Jesús Anaya, born November 22, 1985, is the son of professional wrestler Popitekus, Jr. and from an early age knew that he wanted to be a wrestler like his father. Anaya made his professional wrestling debut at age 17, using the ring name "Bam Bam", inspired by his favorite cartoon character. Because of his size Anaya began working in Consejo Mundial de Lucha Libre's (CMLL) Minis division but he is not a dwarf. Anaya later received further training from Arturo Beristain and José Luis Feliciano, two of CMLL's trainers. As Bam Bam Anaya worked a series of storylines, or feuds with fellow Minis Pequeño Damián 666 and Pequeño Violencia that saw Bam Bam win a series of Luchas de Apuestas, or "Bet Fights", where Pequeño Damián 666, Pequeño Violencia and Pequeño Halloween all ended up with their hair shaved off. The storyline saw Bam Bam defeat Pequeño Damián 666 to win the CMLL World Mini-Estrella Championship on July 27, 2008. The storyline between Bam Bam and Pequeño Damián 666 resulted in Bam Bam being shaved bald after losing a Luchas de Apuesta. While the Minis division has been more active in 2008 and 2009 it has not resulted in more than a single title defense so far. Bam Bam was also left out of the 13 Minis Steel Cage that the main event CMLL's La Hora Cero Pay-Per-View on January 11, 2009. Anaya has expressed a desire to one day move out of the Minis division and wrestle against "regular" wrestlers.

Bam Bam's schedule was greatly reduced in 2009 as he was hampered by injuries, including an injury to his anterior cruciate ligament in his left knee that kept him from wrestling altogether in the latter part of 2009. After his return he began a feud with Pequeño Violencia on Arena Puebla shows, a feud that resulted in Bam Bam winning a Lucha de Apuesta against Pequeño Violencia on March 15, 2010. Bam Bam participated in the 2010 Pequeño Reyes del Aire, but was pinned by eventual winner Pequeño Nitro. The victory earned Pequeño Nitro a title match, Bam Bam's first title defense in 15 months. The champion successfully retained the title on March 14, 2010. In June and July 2010 the feud between Bam Bam and Pequeño Damián 666, now known as Demus 3:16, heated up again with the two facing off in the third Lucha de Apuesta, hair vs. hair match on July 6 which Demus 3:16, potentially earning a shot at Bam Bam's Mini-Estrellas Championship. On February 13, 2011, Bam Bam lost the Mini-Estrellas Championship to Pequeño Olímpico, ending his reign at 931 days.

== Championships and accomplishments ==
- Consejo Mundial de Lucha Libre (CMLL)
  - CMLL World Mini-Estrella Championship (1 time)

== Luchas de Apuestas record ==
Winner (wager)	Loser (wager)	Location	Event	Date	Notes
Bam Bam (hair)	Pequeño Halloween (hair)	Mexico City	CMLL Live event	July 17, 2007	(Note: This was a triangle match that also included Pequeño Damián 666)
Bam Bam (hair)	Pequeño Damián 666 (hair)	Mexico City	CMLL Live event	July 24, 2007	
Bam Bam (hair)	Pequeño Violencia (hair)	Mexico City	CMLL Live event	July 16, 2007	
Pequeño Damián 666 (hair)	Bam Bam (hair)	Mexico City	CMLL Live event	August 17, 2008	
Bam Bam (hair)	Pequeño Violencia (hair)	Puebla, Puebla	CMLL Live event	March 15, 2010	
Demus 3:16 (hair)	Bam Bam (hair)	Mexico City	CMLL Live event	July 6, 2010	
Pierrothito (mask)	Bam Bam (hair)	Mexico City	Mini-Estrellas Torneo de Parejas Increibles	August 21, 2011	(Note: Finals of an eight team Relevos suicidas tournament.)
