= Leyenda de Plata (2008) =

Mexican professional wrestling tournament

- Poster for the finals of the 2008 Leyenda de Plata that also included the 2008 International Gran Prix tournament
- Promotion: Consejo Mundial de Lucha Libre
- Date: July 4, 2008; July 11, 2008; July 25, 2008
- City: Mexico City, Mexico
- Venue: Arena México

Event chronology
← Previous; Infierno en el Ring	Next → Torneo Gran Alternativa

Leyenda de Plata chronology
← Previous; 2007	Next → 2011

The Leyenda de Plata (2008) was professional wrestling tournament produced by the Mexican wrestling promotion Consejo Mundial de Lucha Libre (CMLLl; Spanish "World Wrestling Council") that ran from July 4, 2008, over the course of three of CMLL's Friday night shows in Arena México with the finals on July 25, 2008. The annual Leyenda de Plata tournament is held in honor of lucha libre legend El Santo and is one of CMLL's most important annual tournaments.

After being forced to withdraw from the 2007 tournament due to an injury Perro Aguayo Jr. won the first torneo cibernetico elimination match by outlasting Hajime Ohara, Stuka Jr., El Felino, Ephesto, Averno, La Máscara, Mephisto and Volador Jr. The following week Dr. Wagner Jr. also qualified for the semi-final by defeating Loco Max, El Sagrado, Máscara Purpura, Virus, Sangre Azteca, El Hijo del Fantasma, La Sombra, Black Warrior and Heavy Metal. Perro Aguayo Jr. overcame Dr. Wagner Jr. with the help of Los Perros del Mal and the 2008 Leyenda de Plata saw the final that was originally planned for the 2007 tournament as Místico faced off against Perro Aguayo Jr. As in the semi-final Los Perros del Mal tried to interfere in the main event but was stopped by Místico's friends Héctor Garza and Dos Caras Jr., enabling Místico win Leyenda de Plata for the third time.

== Production ==
=== Background ===
The Leyenda de Plata (Spanish for "the Silver Legend") is an annual lucha libre tournament scripted and promoted by the Mexican professional wrestling promotion Consejo Mundial de Lucha Libre (CMLL). The first Leyenda de Plata was held in 1998 and was in honor of El Santo, nicknamed Enmáscarado de Plata (the Silver mask) from which the tournament got its name. The trophy given to the winner is a plaque with a metal replica of the mask that El Santo wore in both wrestling and lucha films.

The Leyenda de Plata was held annually until 2003, at which point El Santo's son, El Hijo del Santo left CMLL on bad terms. The tournament returned in 2004 and has been held on an almost annual basis since then. The original format of the tournament was the Torneo cibernetico elimination match to qualify for a semi-final. The winner of the semi-final would face the winner of the previous year's tournament in the final. Since 2005 CMLL has held two cibernetico matches and the winner of each then meet in the semi-final. In 2011, the tournament was modified to eliminate the final stage as the previous winner, Místico, did not work for CMLL at that point in time The 2008 edition of La Leyenda de Plata was the 10th overall tournament held by CMLL.

=== Storylines ===
The events featured a total of number of professional wrestling matches with different wrestlers involved in pre-existing scripted feuds, plots and storylines. Wrestlers were portrayed as either heels (referred to as rudos in Mexico, those that portray the "bad guys") or faces (técnicos in Mexico, the "good guy" characters) as they followed a series of tension-building events, which culminated in a wrestling match or series of matches.

== Tournament overview ==
=== Cibernetico 1 ===
#	Eliminated	Eliminated by	Time
1	Hajime Ohara	Stuka Jr.	07:37
2	Stuka Jr.	Ephesto	10:50
3	El Felino	Averno	11:34
4	Ephesto	La Máscara	12:22
5	Averno	Alex Koslov	14:30
6	La Máscara	Mephisto	16:25
7	Alex Koslov	Perro Aguayo Jr.	20:05
8	Mephisto	Volador Jr.	23:38
9	Volador Jr.	Perro Aguayo Jr.	28:19
10	Winner	Perro Aguayo Jr.	29:19

=== Cibernetico 2 ===
#	Eliminated	Eliminated by	Time
1	Loco Max	Máscara Purpura	15:24
2	El Sagrado	Sangre Azteca	18:07
3	Máscara Purpura	Virus	18:58
4	Virus	El Hijo del Fantasma	19:37
5	Sangre Azteca	La Sombra	22:20
6	El Hijo del Fantasma	Black Warrior	26:26
7	La Sombra	Heavy Metal	27:32
8	Black Warrior	Dr. Wagner Jr.	29:30
9	Heavy Metal	Dr. Wagner Jr.	30:26
10	Winner	Dr. Wagner Jr.	30:26

== Results ==
=== July 4, 2008 ===
No.	Results	Stipulations
1	Los Hombres del Camuflaje (Artillero and Súper Comando) defeated Ángel de Oro and El Hijo del Faraón	Best two-out-of-three falls tag team match
2	Pequeño Damian 666 and Pequeño Violencia defeated Shockercito and Tzuki	Best two-out-of-three falls tag team match
3	Rey Bucanero, Sangre Azteca, and Último Guerrero defeated Blue Panther, La Sombra, and El Sagrado	Best two-out-of-three falls six-man tag team match
4	el Hijo del Perro Aguayo defeated Volador Jr., Alex Koslov, La Máscara, Stuka Jr., El Felino, Ohara, Averno, Mephisto, and Ephesto	2008 Leyenda de Plata qualifier, 10-man torneo cibernetico elimination match
5	Heavy Metal, Mr. Niebla, and Negro Casas defeated Dr. Wagner Jr., Héctor Garza, and Místico	Best two-out-of-three falls six-man tag team match

=== July 11, 2008 ===
No.	Results	Stipulations
1	Los Romanos (Calígula and Messala) defeated Astro Boy and Molotov	Best two-out-of-three falls tag team match
2	Dark Angel, Lady Apache, and Marcela defeated La Amapola, Hiroka, and Princesa Sugehit by disqualification	Best two-out-of-three falls six-woman tag team match
3	Dr. Wagner Jr. defeated La Sombra, El Sagrado, El Hijo del Fantasma, Máscara Púrpura, Heavy Metal, Black Warrior, Sangre Azteca, Virus, and Loco Max	2008 Leyenda de Plata qualifier, 10-man torneo cibernetico elimination match
4	Atlantis defeated Blue Panther	Best two-out-of-three falls match
5	Héctor Garza and Místico (c) defeated Mr. Niebla and Negro Casas	Tag team match for the CMLL World Tag Team Championship
(c) / – the champion(s) heading into the match

=== July 18, 2008 ===
No.	Results	Stipulations	Times
1	Molotov and Starman defeated Los Romanos (Caligula and Messala) by disqualification	Best two-out-of-three falls tag team match	09:06
2	Pequeño Violencia, Pequeño Black Warrior and Pierrothito defeated Mascarita Dorada, Shockercito and Último Dragoncito	Best two-out-of-three falls six-man tag team match	13:24
3	Dragón Rojo Jr. and Último Guerrero defeated Ángel Azteca Jr. and Shocker	Gran Alternativa 2008 first round tag team match	06:45
4	Axxel and Blue Panther defeated Puma King and Villano V	Gran Alternativa 2008 first round tag team match	07:11
5	El Bronco and Mr. Niebla defeated Astro Boy and Héctor Garza	Gran Alternativa 2008 first round tag team match	08:26
6	Metalik and Dos Caras Jr. defeated Atlantis and Skándalo	Gran Alternativa 2008 first round tag team match	06:14
7	Dragón Rojo Jr. and Último Guerrero defeated Axxel and Blue Panther	Gran Alternativa 2008 semi-final tag team match	03:36
8	Metalik and Dos Caras Jr. defeated El Bronco and Mr. Niebla	Gran Alternativa 2008 semi-final tag team match	03:08
9	Dragón Rojo Jr. and Último Guerrero defeated Metalik and Dos Caras Jr.	Gran Alternativa 2008 final tag team match	05:48
10	Perro Aguayo Jr. defeated Dr. Wagner Jr.	2008 Leyenda de Plata semi-finals	07:45

=== July 25, 2008 ===
No.	Results	Stipulations	Times
1	Pierrothito and Universito 2000 defeated Niño de Acero and Pequeño Ninja – two falls to one	Best two-out-of-three-falls tag team match	11:32
2	Mictlán and Los Bombardieros (Flash and Stuka Jr.) defeated Dragón Rojo Jr., El Satánico and Virus by disqualification – two falls to one	Best two-out-of-three falls six-man tag team match	11:42
3	"Team International" defeated "Team Mexico" to win the 2008 CMLL International Gran Prix, Alex Shelley was the sole survivor	16-man Torneo cibernetico elimination match	57:37
4	Místico defeated Perro Aguayo Jr. – two falls to one	2008 Leyenda de Plata finals	11:15
