= Leyenda de Plata (2007) =

Mexican professional wrestling tournament

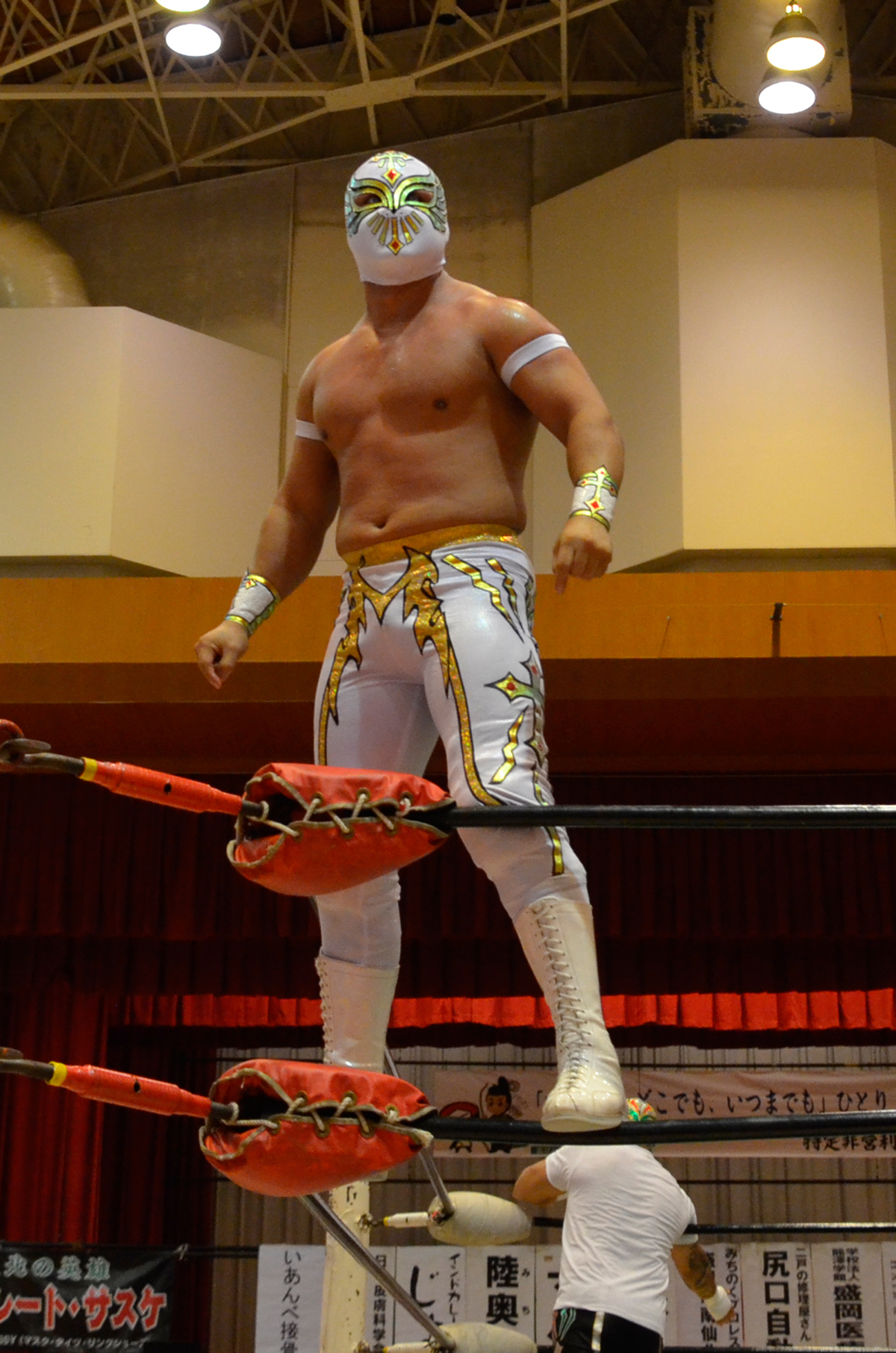
- Místico, the first two-time winner
- Promotion: Consejo Mundial de Lucha Libre
- Date: May 18, 2007; May 25, 2007; June 1, 2007; June 8, 2007
- City: Mexico City, Mexico
- Venue: Arena México

Event chronology
← Previous; International Gran Prix	Next → Torneo Gran Alternativa

Leyenda de Plata chronology
← Previous; 2006	Next → 2008

The Leyenda de Plata (2007) was professional wrestling tournament produced by the Mexican wrestling promotion Consejo Mundial de Lucha Libre (CMLLl; Spanish "World Wrestling Council") that ran from May 18, 2007, over the course of four of CMLL's Friday night shows in Arena México with the finals on June 8, 2007. The annual Leyenda de Plata tournament is held in honor of lucha libre legend El Santo and is one of CMLL's most important annual tournaments. This was the first year that Leyenda de Plata was held without El Hijo del Santo working for CMLL, CMLL claimed that they owned the rights to promote the Leyenda de Plata and has promoted it without Hijo del Santo working for CMLL since then.

The first torneo cibernetico elimination match took place on May 18, Perro Aguayo Jr. was originally scheduled to be part of the match, hinting at a very anticipated Aguayo vs. Místico match that had been building for a while. In the weeks leading up to the first cibernetico Perro Aguayo Jr. was injured and had to pull out of the match, he was replaced by fellow Los Perros del Mal member Mr. Águila, who'd go on to win the qualifier over Negro Casas, El Felino, Tarzan Boy, Mephisto, Máximo, Alex Koslov, Stuka Jr., Volador Jr. and Mictlán. On May 25, 2007 El Sagrado qualified for his first ever Leyenda semi-final as he outlasted Averno, Ephesto, Virus, El Texano Jr., Leono, Loco Max, Valiente, Heavy Metal and Black Warrior. On June 1, 2007 Mr. Águila defeated El Sagrado to earn a spot in the final. On June 8, 2007 Místico became the first wrestler to not only win the tournament twice but also in back to back years as he defeated Mr. Águila. Following his victory Perro Aguayo Jr. attacked Místico furthering the storyline between the top tecnico and top rudo of the promotion.

== Production ==
=== Background ===
The Leyenda de Plata (Spanish for "the Silver Legend") is an annual lucha libre tournament scripted and promoted by the Mexican professional wrestling promotion Consejo Mundial de Lucha Libre (CMLL). The first Leyenda de Plata was held in 1998 and was in honor of El Santo, nicknamed Enmáscarado de Plata (the Silver mask) from which the tournament got its name. The trophy given to the winner is a plaque with a metal replica of the mask that El Santo wore in both wrestling and lucha films.

The Leyenda de Plata was held annually until 2003, at which point El Santo's son, El Hijo del Santo left CMLL on bad terms. The tournament returned in 2004 and has been held on an almost annual basis since then. The original format of the tournament was the Torneo cibernetico elimination match to qualify for a semi-final. The winner of the semi-final would face the winner of the previous year's tournament in the final. Since 2005 CMLL has held two cibernetico matches and the winner of each then meet in the semi-final. In 2011, the tournament was modified to eliminate the final stage as the previous winner, Místico, did not work for CMLL at that point in time The 2007 edition of La Leyenda de Plata was the ninth overall tournament held by CMLL.

=== Storylines ===
The events featured a total of number of professional wrestling matches with different wrestlers involved in pre-existing scripted feuds, plots and storylines. Wrestlers were portrayed as either heels (referred to as rudos in Mexico, those that portray the "bad guys") or faces (técnicos in Mexico, the "good guy" characters) as they followed a series of tension-building events, which culminated in a wrestling match or series of matches.

== Tournament overview ==
=== Cibernetico 1 ===
#	Eliminated	Eliminated by	Time
1	Mictlán	Volador Jr.	05:06
2	Tarzan Boy	Injured	05:43
3	Stuka Jr.	El Felino	07:00
4	El Felino	Mephisto	08:45
5	Máximo	Alex Koslov	11:01
6	Volador Jr.	Mr. Águila	12:14
7	Alex Koslov	Mr. Águila	13:02
8	Mephisto	Negro Casas	15:14
9	Negro Casas	Mr. Águila	15:26
10	Winner	Mr. Águila	15:26

=== Cibernetico 2 ===
#	Eliminated	Eliminated by
1	Leono	N/A
2	Loco Max	N/A
3	El Texano Jr.	N/A
4	Valiente	N/A
5	Averno	N/A
6	Ephesto	N/A
7	Black Warrior	N/A
8	Virus	N/A
9	Heavy Metal	El Sagrado
10	Winner	El Sagrado

== Results ==
=== May 18, 2007 ===
No.	Results	Stipulations
1	Fantasy and Último Dragóncito defeated Pequeño Violencia and Pierrothito	Best two-out-of-three falls tag team match
2	Dark Angel, Diana La Cazadora, and Marcela defeated Hiroka, Mima Shimoda, and Princesa Sugehit	Best two-out-of-three falls six-man tag team match
3	Dos Caras Jr., El Sagrado, and Último Dragón defeated Minoru Suzuki, Takayama, and El Terrible	Best two-out-of-three falls six-man tag team match
4	Mr. Águila defeated Negro Casas, El Felino, Tarzan Boy, Mephisto, Máximo, Alex Koslov, Stuka Jr., Volador Jr., and Mictlán	2007 Leyenda de Plata qualifier, 10-man torneo cibernetico elimination match
5	Dr. Wagner Jr. and Marco Corleone defeated Atlantis and Último Guerrero	Best two-out-of-three falls tag team match

=== May 25, 2007 ===
No.	Results	Stipulations
1	Brillante, Flash, and Súper Nova defeated Apocalipsis, Hooligan, and Ramstein	Best two-out-of-three falls six-man tag team match
2	Alex Koslov, Blue Panther, and Negro Casas defeated Mephisto, Misterioso Jr., and Sangre Azteca	Best two-out-of-three falls six-man tag team match
3	El Sagrado defeated Averno, Ephesto, Virus, Texano Jr., Leono, Loco Max, Valiente, Heavy Metal, and Black Warrior	2017 Leyenda de Plata semi-final, 10-man torneo cibernetico elimination match
4	Héctor Garza, Mr. Águila, and El Terrible defeated Dr. Wagner Jr., Lizmark Jr., and Místico	Best two-out-of-three falls six-man tag team match

=== June 1, 2007 ===
No.	Results	Stipulations
1	Metálico, Neutrón, and Stuka Jr. defeated Arkángel de la Muerte, Loco Max, and Nitro	Best two-out-of-three falls six-man tag team match
2	Flash, La Sombra, and Súper Nova defeated Hirooki Goto, Ohara, and Okumura	Best two-out-of-three falls six-man tag team match
3	Villano III, Villano IV, and Villano V defeated Atlantis, Olímpico, and Sangre Azteca	Best two-out-of-three falls six-man tag team match
4	Damián 666, Lizmark Jr., and El Terrible defeated Dr. Wagner Jr., Marco Corleone, and Místico	Best two-out-of-three falls six-man tag team match
5	Mr. Águila defeated El Sagrado	2007 Leyenda de Plata semi-finals

=== June 8, 2007 ===
No.	Results	Stipulations
1	Fantasy and Tzuki defeated Pequeño Violencia and Pierrothito	Best two-out-of-three falls tag team match
2	La Sombra, Máscara Púrpura, and Súper Nova defeated Euforia, Misterioso Jr., and Nosferatu	Best two-out-of-three falls six-man tag team match
3	Alex Koslov, Marco Corleone, and Rey Bucanero defeated Damián 666, Halloween, and El Terrible	Best two-out-of-three falls six-man tag team match
4	Villano III, Villano IV, and Villano V defeated Atlantis, Olímpico, and Sangre Azteca by disqualification	Best two-out-of-three falls six-man tag team match
5	Místico defeated Mr. Águila	2007 Leyenda de Plata finals
6	Blue Panther, Dr. Wagner Jr., and Shocker defeated Black Warrior, Toscano, and Último Guerrero	Best two-out-of-three falls six-man tag team match
