= Torneo Gran Alternativa (2008) =

Mexican professional wrestling tournament

Torneo Gran Alternativa 2008
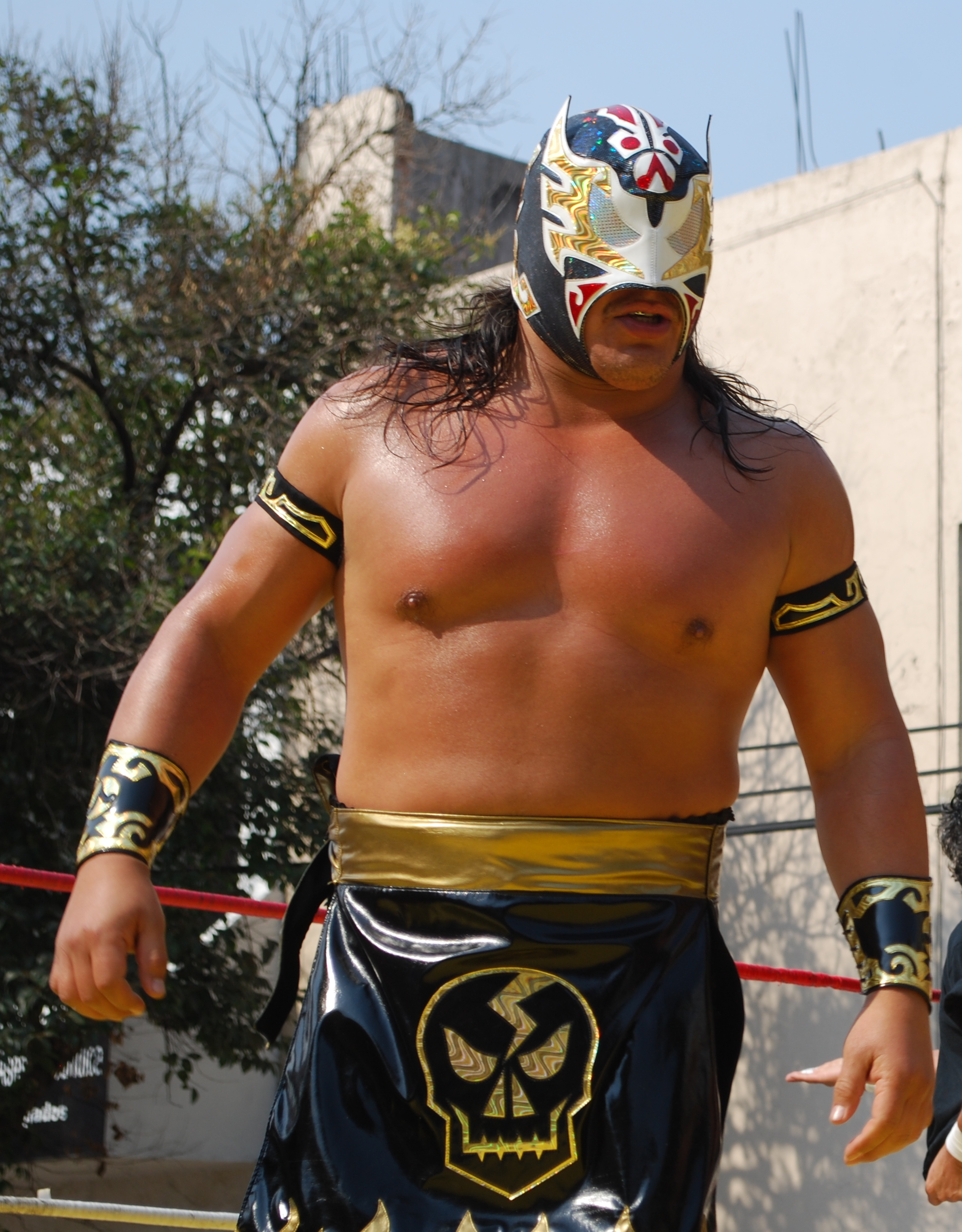
- Último Guerrero, teamed with novato Dragón Rojo Jr. to win the tournament.
- Promotion: Consejo Mundial de Lucha Libre
- Date: July 18, 2008
- City: Mexico City, Mexico
- Venue: Arena México

Event chronology
← Previous; Leyenda de Plata	Next → International Gran Prix

CMLL Torneo Gran Alternativa chronology
← Previous; 2007	Next → 2009

The Torneo Gran Alternativa (2008) (Spanish for the "Great Alternative Tournament") was a one-night, eight-team professional wrestling tournament held on July 18, 2017 by the Mexican professional wrestling promotion Consejo Mundial de Lucha Libre (CMLL; "World Wrestling Council"). The 2008 Gran Alternativa was the 14th time CMLL held the Torneo Gran Alternativa since the first tournament was held in 1994. The Gran Alternativa tournament concept is to team a young, or low ranking novato up with a veteran wrestler for tag team tournament as a way to highlight the novato wrestlers, potentially elevating one or more of them up the ranks of CMLL. The winning team was awarded a trophy, but no other tangible rewards for winning the tournament.

The 14th version of the Gran ALternativa was held in Arena México, CMLL's primary venue, as part of their Friday night CMLL Super Viernes ("Super Friday") show. The show took place on the same night as the semi-finals of that year's Leyenda de Plata ("Silver Legend") tournament. In the finals of the tournament Novato Dragón Rojo Jr. and veteran Último Guerrero defeated novato Metalik and Dos Caras Jr. to win the tournament. The victory was the start of Dragón Rojo Jr.'s promotional push as he began working higher on the card after the victory, including forming his own group with Black Warrior and Sangre Azteca known as Poder Mexica ("Mexican Power").

== History ==
Starting in 1994 the Mexican professional wrestling promotion Consejo Mundial de Lucha Libre (CMLL) created a special tournament concept where they would team up a novato, or rookie, with a veteran for a single-elimination tag team tournament. The tournament was called El Torneo Gran Alternativa, or "The Great Alternative Tournament" and became a recurring event on the CMLL calendar. While established "veteran" wrestlers participated in the tournament the ultimate goal of the tournament is to feature the novato wrestlers, giving them a chance to perform at a higher level than they normally worked at and as an opportunity to elevate the status of one or more of the competitors.

The Gran Alternativa was held twice in both 1996 and 1999, and not at all in 1997 and 2000, but has otherwise been held once a year since its inception in 1994. The 2008 Gran Alternativa tournament was the 14th overall Gran Alternativa tournament. All tournaments have been held in Arena México, CMLL's main venue and had taken place on Friday nights. CMLL holds other similar tournaments focusing on younger wrestlers, such as La Copa Junior, En Busca de un Ídolo ("In Search of an Idol"), Torneo Sangre Nueva ("New Blood Tournament"), and Forjando un Ídolo ("Forging an Idol"), although all of those tournaments focuses on singles competition.

== Tournament background ==
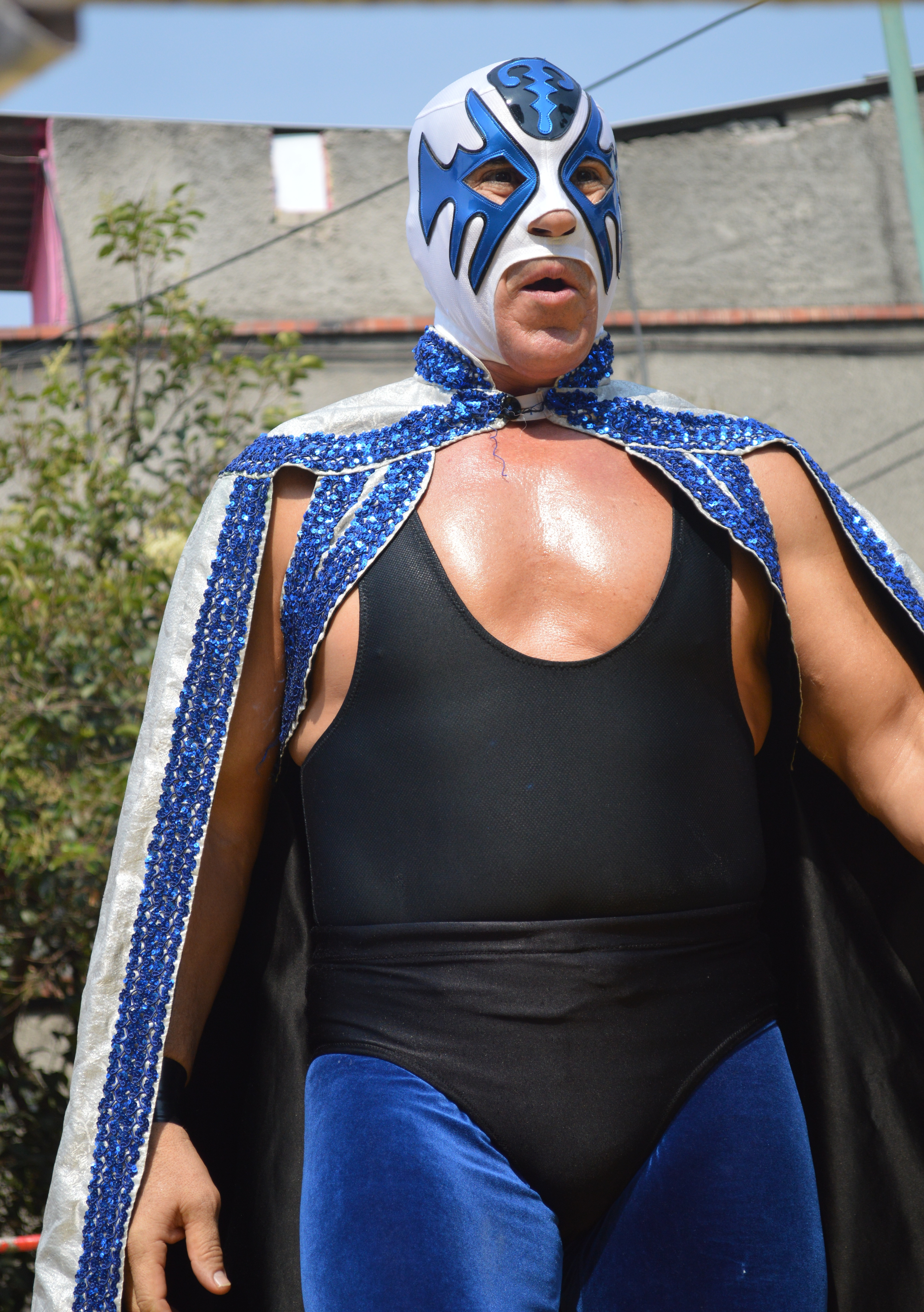
Atlantis, competed in his seventh Torneo Gran Alternativa in 2008.

The tournament featured 7 professional wrestling matches with wrestlers competing as tag teams competing in matches with pre-determined outcomes. Some competitors in the tournament were involved in pre-existing scripted feuds or storylines while others were paired up or matched up against each other for the sake of the tournament. Wrestlers portray either villains (referred to as Rudos in Mexico) or fan favorites (Técnicos in Mexico) as they compete in wrestling matches.

Originally the fourteenth Torneo Gran Alternativa was supposed to feature a novato known as "El Brujo", but when El Brujo suffered an injury he was replaced by Puma King, who was billed as the nephew of wrestler El Felino, teaming up with Villano V for the tournament. When the tournament was first announced Último Guerrero's novato partner was listed as "Diamante Negro", but in the days prior to the actual tournament Diamante Negro was given a new ring persona and mask, taking the name Dragón Rojo Jr. ("Red Dragon Jr."). None of the novatos, Ángel Azteca Jr., Astro Boy, Axxel, Dragón Rojo Jr., Metalik, Puma King, Skándalo and Bronco had previously competed in a Torneo Gran Alternativa. A different masked wrestler using the name "El Bronco" competed in the June 1996 Torneo Gran Alternativa, and Silver King used the same name when he competed in the 2005 Torneo Gran Alternativa.

Three of the veterans Héctor Garza, Shocker and Último Guerrero, had previously won the tournament as a Novato, Garza won The first tournament, Shocker won the second tournament and Último Guerrero in April 1999. Atlantis, who teamed up with Skándalo for the 2008 tournament was the only wrestler to have previously won the tournament as a veteran, winning the 2005 tournament with novato La Máscara. Atlantis was the veteran with the most Torneo Gran Alternativa appearances with the 2008 version being his seventh tournament.

Torneo Gran Alternativa participants

Rookie	Veteran	Ref(s)
Ángel Azteca Jr.	Shocker	
Astro Boy	Héctor Garza	
Axxel	Blue Panther	
Bronco	Mr. Niebla	
Dragón Rojo Jr.	Último Guerrero	
Metalik	Dos Caras Jr.	
Puma King	Villano V	
Skándalo	Atlantis	

== Tournament results ==
Traditionally CMLL uses a battle royal match featuring all the novato wrestlers to determined the order of the first round matches, but in 2008 CMLL skipped the seeding battle royal and went straight to the first tag team match. All the first round and semi-final matches were one-fall matches while the finals was a best two-out-of-three falls, the traditional match form in Mexico. In the first tournament match of the night Dragón Rojo Jr. and Último Guerrero defeated the team of Angel Azteca Jr. and Shocker in six minutes and forty-six seconds. In the second opening round match the tecnico team of Axxl and Blue Panther defeated Puma King and Villano V, followed by Bronco and Mr. Niebla defeating Astro Boy and Héctor Garza. In the final first round match Metalik and second-generation luchador Dos Caras Jr. defeated the rudo team of Skándalo and Atlantis to close out the round. Both second round matches were short, clocking in at 3:36 and 3:08 respectively as Dragón Rojo Jr. and Último Guerrero defeated Axxl and Blue Panther while Metalik and Dos Caras Jr. defeated Bronco and Mr. Niebla. In the third and final round of the tournament Dragón Rojo Jr. and Último Guerrero defeated Metalik and Dos Caras Jr. in five minutes and forty-eight seconds to win 2008 Torneo Gran Alternativa.

=== Tournament brackets ===
Quarterfinals
Último Guerrero and Dragón Rojo Jr.	W
Shocker and Angel Azteca Jr.	06:46
Blue Panther and Axxel	W
Villaño V and Puma King	07:11
Mr. Niebla and El Bronco	W
Héctor Garza and Astro Boy	08:26
Dos Caras Jr. and Metalik	W
Atlantis and Skándalo	06:14

Semifinals
Último Guerrero and Dragón Rojo Jr.	W
Blue Panther and Axel	03:36
Mr. Niebla and Bronco	03:08
Dos Caras Jr. and Metalik	W

Finals
Último Guerrero and Dragón Rojo Jr.	W
Dos Caras Jr. and Metalik	05:48

== July 18, 2008 Super Viernes ==
No.	Results	Stipulations	Times
1	Molotov and Starman defeated Los Romanos (Caligula and Messala) by disqualification	Best two-out-of-three falls tag team match	09:06
2	Pequeño Violencia, Pequeño Black Warrior and Pierrothito defeated Mascarita Dorada, Shockercito and Último Dragoncito	Six-man "Lucha Libre rules" tag team match	13:24
3	Dragón Rojo Jr. and Último Guerrero defeated Ángel Azteca Jr. and Shocker	Gran Alternativa 2008 first round tag team match	06:45
4	Axxel and Blue Panther defeated Puma King and Villano V	Gran Alternativa 2008 first round tag team match	07:11
5	El Bronco and Mr. Niebla defeated Astro Boy and Héctor Garza	Gran Alternativa 2008 first round tag team match	08:26
6	Metalik and Dos Caras Jr. defeated Atlantis and Skándalo	Gran Alternativa 2008 first round tag team match	06:14
7	Dragón Rojo Jr. and Último Guerrero defeated Axxel and Blue Panther	Gran Alternativa 2008 semi-final tag team match	03:36
8	Metalik and Dos Caras Jr. defeated El Bronco and Mr. Niebla	Gran Alternativa 2008 semi-final tag team match	03:08
9	Dragón Rojo Jr. and Último Guerrero defeated Metalik and Dos Caras Jr.	Gran Alternativa 2008 final tag team match	05:48
10	Perro Aguayo Jr. defeated Dr. Wagner Jr.	Best two-out-of-three falls, 2008 Leyenda de Plata semi-final match	07:45

== Aftermath ==
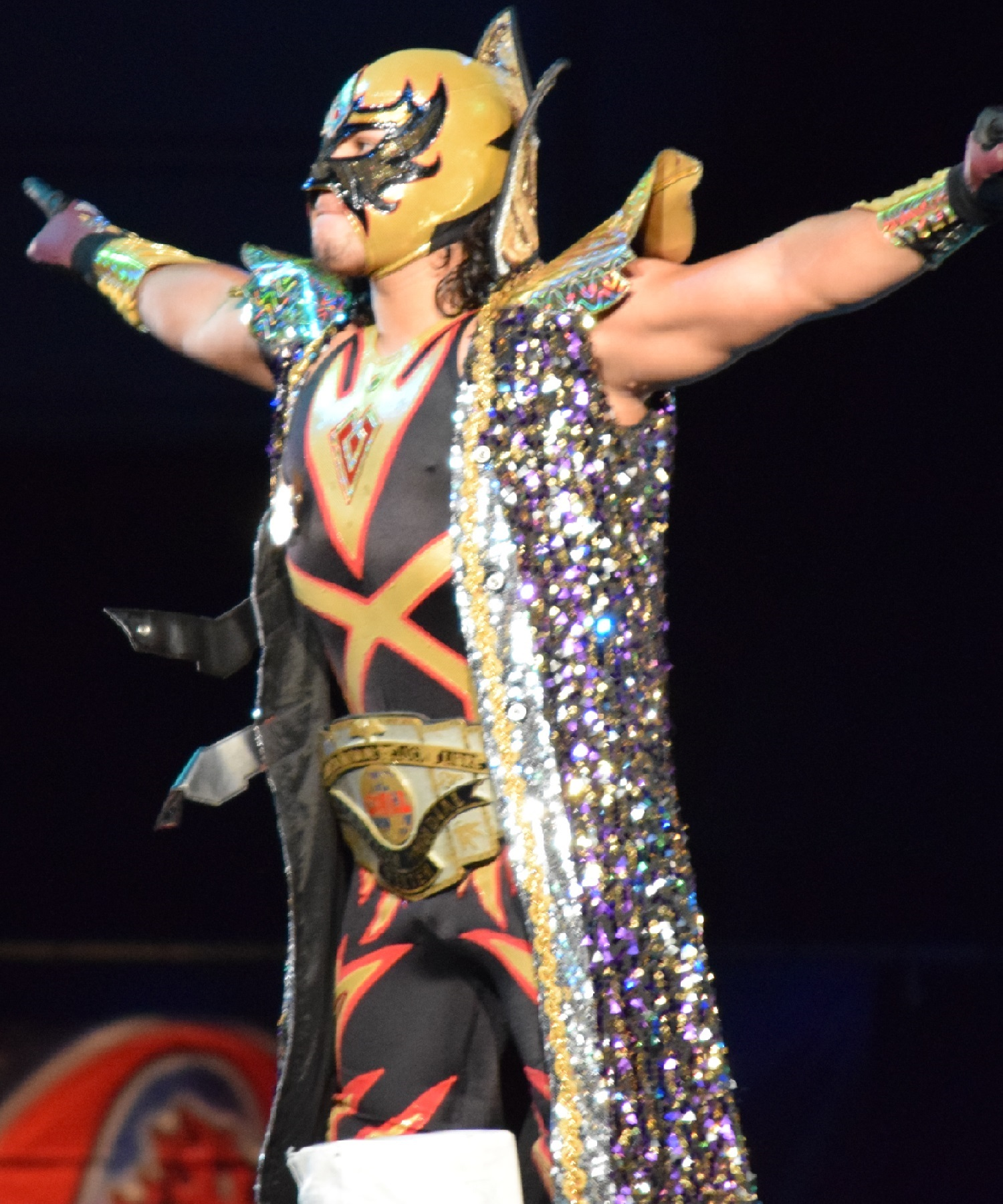
Metalik after he was given a new ring identity as Máscara Dorada

Dragón Rojo Jr. followed up the Gran Alternatia victory by starting a storyline feud with Mictlán. The feud led to a Lucha de Apuestas ("Bet match") at CMLL's 2008 Sin Piedad show. Dragón Rojo Jr. won the match and forced Mictlán to unmask per the stipulation of the match. Over the years Dragón Rojo Jr. would rise up the ranks of CMLL, first forming the group Poder Mexica with Black Warrior and Sangre Azteca. Later on he would join Último Guerrero's group Los Guerreros del Infierno, the main rudo group in CMLL. He later broke away from Los Guerrero del Infierno to form his own group, known as Los Revolucionarios del Terror.

The 2008 Gran Alternativa tournament was also a chapter in a feud between Villano V and Blue Panther, with Blue Panther defeating his rival in the opening round. The two would later wrestle in the main event of the CMLL 75th Anniversary Show where Blue Panther lost and was forced to unmask.

On November 7, 2008 Metalik was repackaged as he was given a new name, mask and suit, making his debut as Máscara Dorada ("Golden Mask"), helping his team defeat the trio of Averno, Mephisto and Ephesto. He would later go on to win various championships in subsequent years as he rose up through the ranks of CMLL.
