= CMLL International Gran Prix (2008) =

Mexican professional wrestling tournament

- Official poster for the 2008 tournament as well as the main event of that year's Leyenda de Plata tournament.
- Promotion(s): Consejo Mundial de Lucha Libre; Total Nonstop Action Wrestling
- Date: July 25, 2008
- City: Mexico City, Mexico
- Venue: Arena Mexico
- Attendance: 16,500 (Estimate)

Event chronology
← Previous; Torneo Gran Alternativa	Next → Sin Piedad

International Gran Prix chronology
← Previous; 2007	Next → 2016

The CMLL International Gran Prix (2008) was a lucha libre, or professional wrestling, tournament produced and scripted by the Mexican professional wrestling promotion Consejo Mundial de Lucha Libre (CMLL; "World Wrestling Council" in Spanish) that took place on the July 25, 2008 CMLL Super Viernes ("Super Friday") show in Arena México, Mexico City, Mexico, CMLL's main venue. The 2008 International Gran Prix was the eleventh time CMLL held an International Gran Prix tournament since 1994 and the last one held until the 2016 tournament was announced.

The International Gran Prix tournament featured a 16-man Torneo Cibernetico elimination with a team representing Mexico (Averno, Dos Caras, Jr., Héctor Garza, Rey Bucanero, Shocker, Último Guerrero, Volador Jr. and Dr. Wagner, Jr.) facing "Team International", a combination of foreign wrestlers that worked for CMLL at the time (Alex Koslov and Marco Corleone) and six wrestlers from Total Nonstop Action Wrestling (TNA) (A.J. Styles, Alex Shelley, Johnny Devine, Chris Sabin, Jay Lethal and Sonjay Dutt). Alex Shelley of Team International eliminated Último Guerrero as the last man to win the tournament. The International Gran Prix tournament took place on the same night of the finals of the Leyenda de Plata ("Silver Legend") tournament where Místico defeated Perro Aguayo Jr. to win that tournament.

== Production ==
=== Background ===
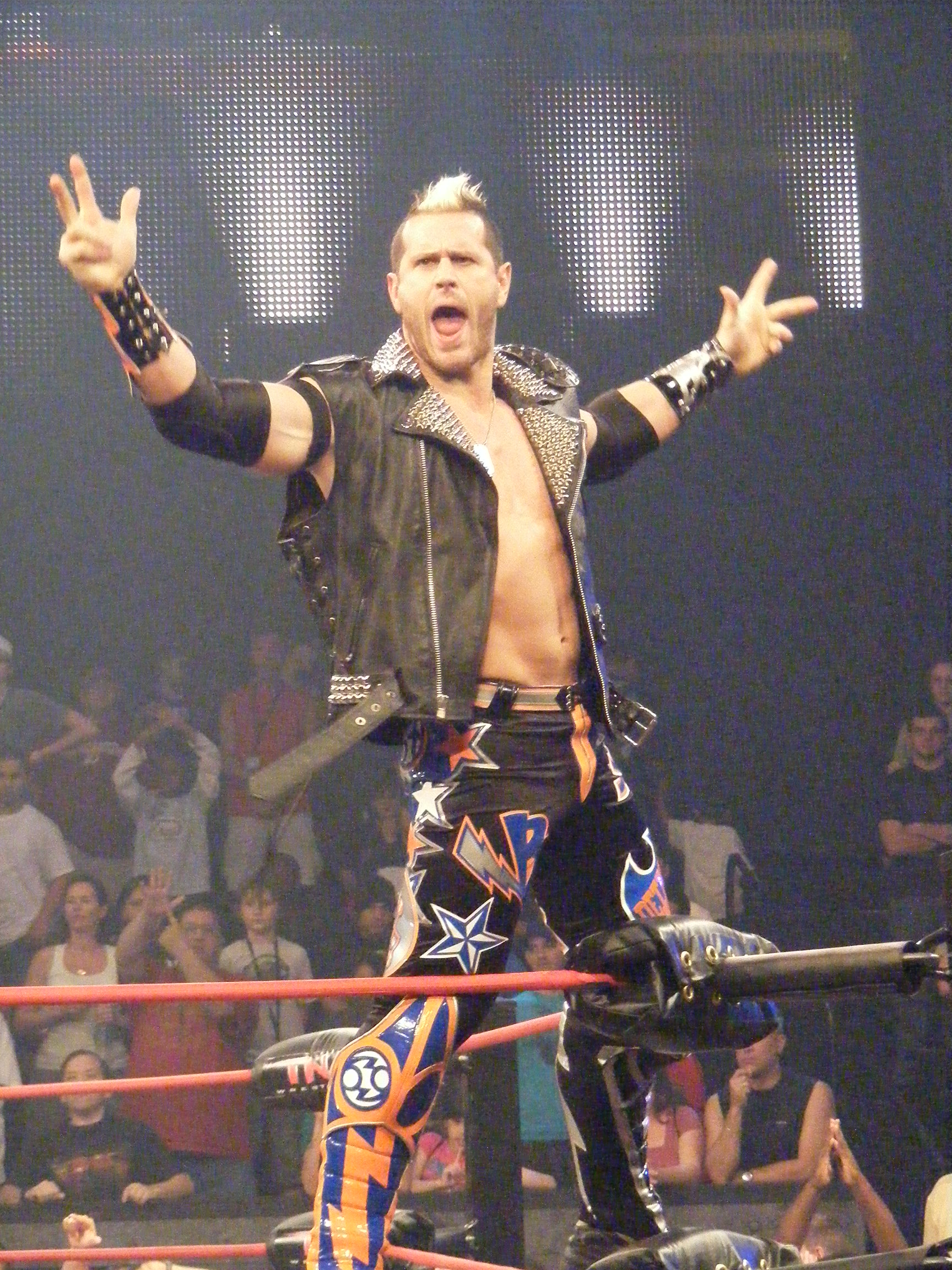
Alex Shelley, represented Total Nonstop Action Wrestling and the United States.

In 1994 the Mexican professional wrestling promotion Consejo Mundial de Lucha Libre (CMLL) organized their first ever International Gran Prix tournament. The first tournament followed the standard "single elimination" format and featured sixteen wrestlers in total, eight representing Mexico and eight "international" wrestlers. Some of these international wrestlers were already working for CMLL at the time, such as King Haku and Corazon de León while others came to Mexico specifically for the tournament such as Japanese wrestler Yamato. In the end Mexican Rayo de Jalisco Jr. defeated King Haku in the finals to win the tournament. In 1995 CMLL brought the tournament back, creating an annual tournament held every year from 1995 through 1998 and then again in 2002, 2003 and finally from 2005 through 2008. The first five tournaments from 1994 through 1998 were all standard 16-man tournaments, but when CMLL brought the International Gran Prix tournament back in 2002 it was modified into a Torneo Cibernetico elimination match where an eight-man "Team Mexico" would face off against an eight-man "Team International" until only one team or wrestler survived.

Rayo de Jalisco Jr. won both the inaugural tournament as well as the 1998 International Gran Prix tournament, making him one of only two wrestlers to win the tournament twice. The other repeat winner was Último Guerrero, who won both the 2006 and 2007 International Gran Prixs. Headhunter A (1995) and Steel (1997) were the only "Team International" wrestlers to win a tournament prior to the 2008 International Gran Prix tournament. From 2009 through 2015 CMLL did not hold an International Gran Prix but they announced the return of the tournament in May 2016. In 2008 the International Gran Prix took place on the same night as the finals of CMLL's Leyenda de Plata ("Silver Legend") tournament, bringing the three-week long Leyenda de Plata tournament to a close.

=== Storylines ===
The CMLL Gran Prix show featured four professional wrestling matches where wrestlers were matched up specifically for the tournament instead of as a result of pre-existing scripted feuds. The wrestlers themselves portray either faces (técnicos in Mexico, the "good guy" characters) or heels (referred to as rudos in Mexico, those that portray the "bad guys") as they perform for the fans before, during and after the matches.

Between June 10 and July 13, 2008 CMLL sent four representatives to Orlando, Florida to compete in Total Nonstop Action Wrestling's 2008 TNA World X Cup Tournament. Team Mexico consisted of Último Guerrero (team captain), Rey Bucanero, Averno and Volador Jr. CMLL also sent Alex Koslov to Orlando, allowing the Russian wrestler to represent Team International. In the first round the team of Último Guerrero and Rey Bucanero defeated Team Japan representatives "Speed Muscle" (Naruki Doi and Masato Yoshino) to earn a point for Team Mexico. The second round of the tournament saw Rey Bucanero defeat Alex Koslov in a short match, and later on Kaz defeated Último Guerrero. The third round of the tournament took place at the 2008 Victory Road pay per view (PPV). Team Mexico was eliminated little over halfway through the match as Guerrero, Bucanero and Averno all were eliminated. In the final match of the tournament Volador Jr. represented Mexico in an Ultimate X match, winning the match by climbing the structure and retrieving the large X logo suspended over the ring. With his victory Team Mexico won the 2008 World X Cup tournament, with Team TNA (Kaz, Alex Shelley, Chris Sabin and Curry Man) runners-up.

In the days after the World X-Cup tournament win, CMLL announced that they were bringing several TNA wrestlers to Mexico for the 2008 "International Gran Prix" tournament. Shelly and Sabin from the World X-Cup were announced for the tournament, joined by TNA regulars A.J. Styles, Jay Lethal, Sonjay Dutt and Christopher Daniels to be part of the international side for the Gran Prix.

== Event ==
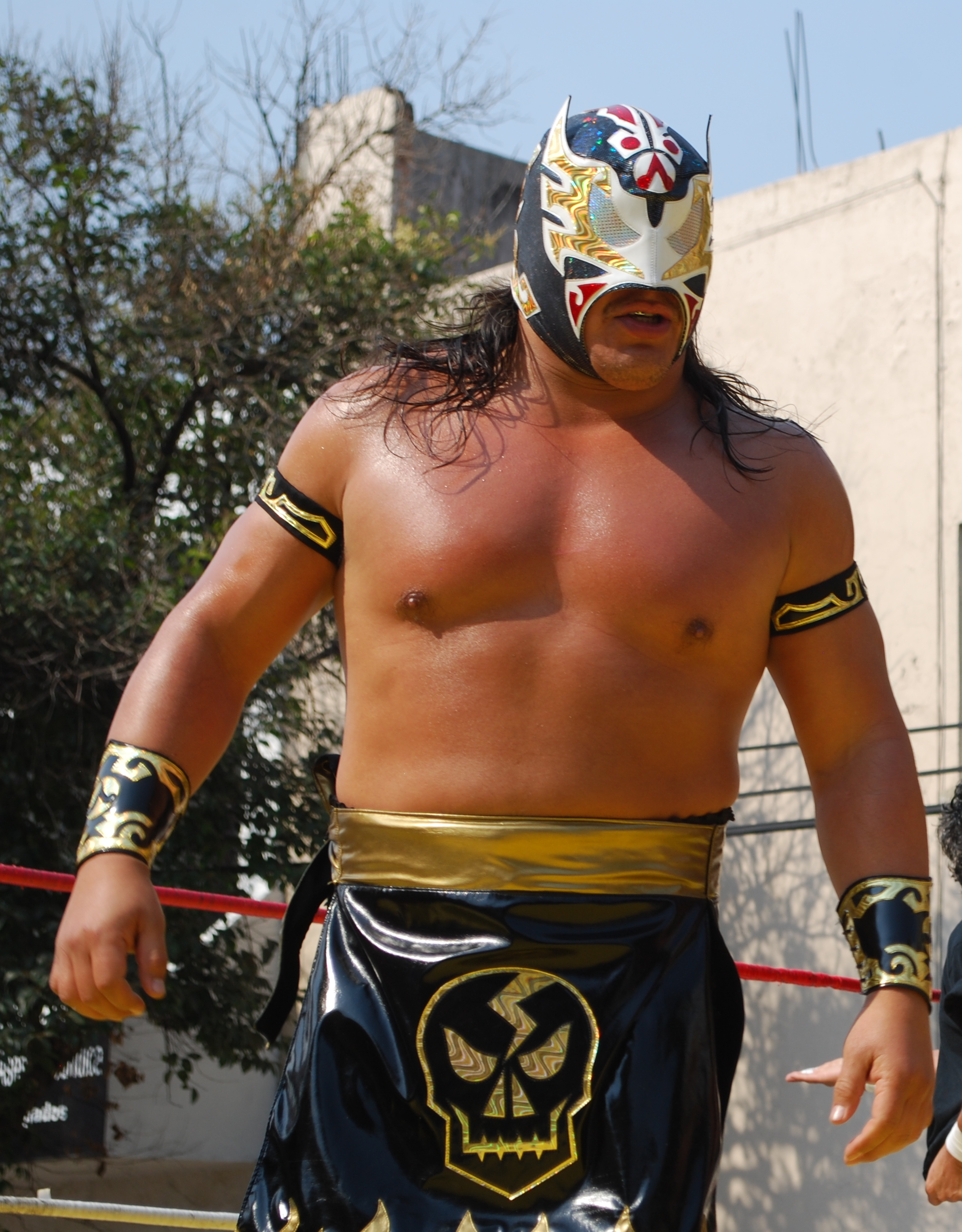
Último Guerrero, the last man eliminated in the International Gran Prix tournament

The opening match of the show was a best two-out-of-three-falls tag team match featuring four wrestlers from CMLL's Mini-Estrella division as the rudo team of Pierrothito and Universito 2000 faced off against the tecnico team of Niño de Acero and Pequeño Ninja. The first two falls were split between the teams in less than five minutes, with the third and deciding fall lasting longer than the first two combined. After 11 minutes, 32 second Pierrothito pinned Pequeño Ninja to win the match for his side. The second match of the night was the only Best two-out-of-three-falls six-man tag team match of the show, normally the most common match type in Lucha Libre. For the match Dragón Rojo Jr., El Satánico and Virus won the first fall when Los Bombardieros (Flash and Stuka Jr.) were forced to submit to Satánico and Virus. In the second fall the third tecnico, Mictlán, pinned Dragón Rojo Jr. to further the ongoing storyline between the two. In the third fall, the rudo team was by disqualification when Dragón Rojo Jr. intentionally unmasked his Mictlán in plain view of the referee. Unmasking an opponent during a match is an automatic disqualification in lucha libre.

The third match of the night was the International Gran Prix tournament. Christopher Daniels was originally scheduled to be part of "Team International" but was replaced with Johnny Devine due to a TNA storyline where Daniels supposedly had been fired from the company. The sixteen-man torneo cibernetico match lasted almost a full hour, officially timed at 57 minutes and 37 seconds from the opening bell to the last elimination. For the first eighteen minutes of the match Team Mexico and Team International members took turns facing off in the middle of the ring, allowing all sixteen wrestlers to show off their skills before a single man was eliminated from the tournament. Rey Bucanero gave Team Mexico an advantage when he pinned Alex Koslov 18 minutes, 5 seconds into the match. The next three eliminations were all from Team Mexico as Averno (by Sonjay Dutt), Volador Jr. (by Jay Lethal) and Rey Bucanero (by A.J. Styles) were eliminated. The fifth elimination of the night happened just over thirty minutes into the match as Sonjay Dutt was pinned by Héctor Garza. Five minutes later Último Guerrero took advantage of the referee being distracted to his Styles' with a low blow, allowing Guerrero to pin A.J. Styles evening the sides between the two teams to five-a-side. Further eliminations followed with Dos Caras Jr. (by Marco Corleone), Jay Lethal (by Dr. Wagner Jr.), Johnny Devine (by Shocker) and Héctor Garza (by Corleone) brought the numbers down to six in total, three on each team.

At this point, Team International's Sabin and Shelley took advantage of their well-developed teamwork, having worked together as the Motor City Machine Guns since 2006, by double-teaming Dr. Wagner Jr. to allow Shelley to eliminate the Doctor over 47 minutes into the match. Just over a minute later Shocker and Último Guerrero countered one of Corleone's high flying moves to pin and eliminate Corleone from Team International. A double Superkick to Shocker allowed Shelley and Sabin to eliminate him, leaving Último Guerrero as the only member of Team Mexico. Último Guerrero was able to pin Chris Sabin, leaving only himself and Shelley. In the closing moments of the match, Último Guerrero managed to pin Sabin, eliminating him from the match. Minutes later Alex Shelley locked in a submission hold, then pulled Guerrero's mask off in the process out of view of the referee. The hold and Guerrero's attempts to cover his face led to Último Guerrero submitting to the hold moments later, giving Alex Shelley the victory and the International Gran Prix trophy. After the match Último Guerrero challenged Alex Shelley to a Lucha de Apuestas, or "bet match", where Shelley would risk his hair against Guerrero's wrestling mask. Shelley said he would think about it and would give Guerrero an answer after he had a chance to relax.

The main event for the 2008 Leyenda de Plata tournament was a singles match between CMLL's top tecnico Místico and one of CMLL's top rudo workers, Perro Aguayo Jr., who had been long-time rivals even prior to the match. Aguayo Jr. won the first fall pinning Místico, while Místico won the second fall with an armbar submission. After the second fall, Aguayo Jr. claimed he needed to have his arm checked out by the doctor, stalling for time and seeking to frustrate his opponent. During the third fall Aguayo's fellow Los Perros del Mal teammates came to the ring, but their interference was stopped by Dos Caras Jr. and Héctor Garza, allowing Místico to win the third fall and the Leyenda de Plata tournament for the third year in a row.

== Aftermath ==
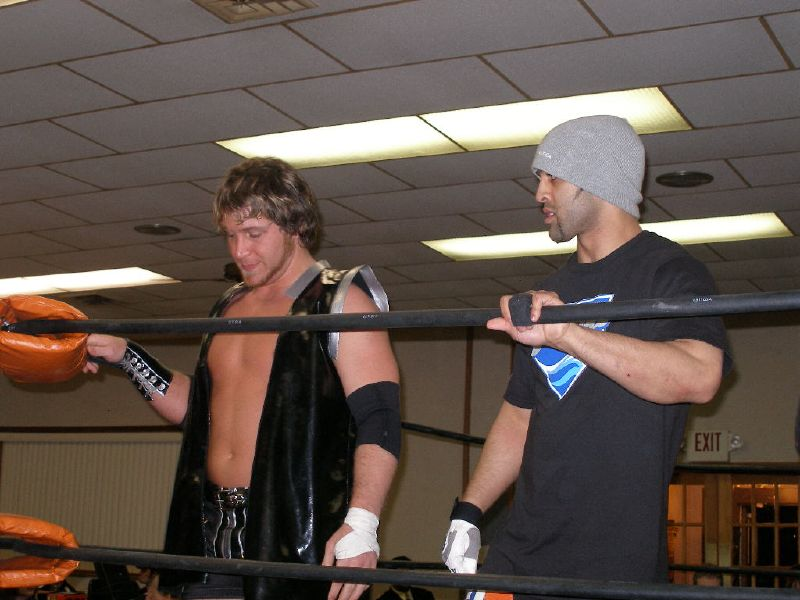
Chris Sabin (right) and Sonjay Dutt (left), who along with Alex Shelley, returned for CMLL's Sin Piedad and CMLL 75th Anniversary Show in 2008.

Shelly, Sabin and Dutt returned to CMLL on August 29, 2008 to work on the Sin Piedad ("No Mercy") pay-per-view (PPV). At Sin Piedad Dutt and the Motor City Machine Guns defeated Los Guerreros Negro (Atlantis, Negro Casas and Último Guerrero) in the fifth match of the night. Due to their victory over the then-CMLL World Trios Champions, Team TNA returned to Mexico on September 19, 2008 for the CMLL 75th Anniversary Show, but were unable to defeat Los Guerreros Negro when the championship was on the line. The Lucha de Apuestas challenge laid out by Último Guerrero after the International Gran Prix loss never happened as the CMLL/TNA working relationship ended a few months later.

The storyline between Místico and Perro Aguayo Jr. was abruptly ended in the fall of 2008 when Aguayo and most of the Los Perros del Mal left CMLL, striking out on their own to form Promociones Perros del Mal, an independent wrestling promotion. In 2011 Místico left CMLL to work for WWE, adopting the name Sin Cara from 2011 until he left the promotion in 2014. After his release he returned to Mexico, working for AAA (AAA) using the ring name Myzteziz. In AAA he rekindled his storyline rivalry with Perro Aguayo Jr., but it was tragically ended after Aguayo died as result of injuries suffered during a match against Rey Mysterio and Xtreme Tiger on March 21, 2015.

The undercard storyline between técnico Mictlán and rudo Dragón Rojo Jr. reached its crescendo on August 29, 2008 as both men put their wrestling mask on the line in a Lucha de Apuestas, or "bet match", in the semi-main event of the 2008 Sin Piedad PPV. Dragón Rojo Jr. won the match, forcing Mictlán to unmask and reveal his real name, Jonathan de Jesus Navarro Jímenez, per lucha libre traditions. The Apuesta marked the rise of Dragón Rojo Jr. in the CMLL ranks as he would go on to become a part of various Rudo fractions such as Poder Mexica ("Mexican Power"), Los Guerreros del Infierno ("The Infernal Warriors"), and a founding member of Los Revolucionarios del Terror ("The Revolutionaries of Terror"). He was voted CMLL 2009 "Revelation of the year", for his achievements based on the Mictlán mask win and subsequent in-ring success.

== Reception ==
The July 25, 2008 Arena Mexico show drew an estimated crowd of 16,500, which was close to a sell out for the arena and a significant increase in attendance compared to the Super Viernes shows in the weeks prior to the Universal Tournament and the Leyenda de Plata finals. Súper Luchas magazine later described the Universal Tournament as a promising sign of what the CMLL/TNA working relationship would bring, but in hindsight also noted that it turned out that those promises were never fulfilled as the two companies stopped working together by the end of 2008.

== Results ==
No.	Results	Stipulations	Times
1	Pierrothito and Universito 2000 defeated Niño de Acero and Pequeño Ninja – two falls to one	Best two-out-of-three-falls tag team match	11:32
2	Mictlán and Los Bombardieros (Flash and Stuka Jr.) defeated Dragón Rojo Jr., El Satánico and Virus by disqualification – two falls to one	Best two-out-of-three-falls six-man tag team match	11:42
3	"Team International" defeated "Team Mexico" to win the 2008 CMLL International Gran Prix, Alex Shelley was the sole survivor	16-man Torneo cibernetico elimination match	57:37
4	Místico defeated Perro Aguayo Jr. – two falls to one	Best two-out-of-three-falls match, 2008 Leyenda de Plata tournament final.	11:15

=== Order of elimination ===
#	Eliminated	By	Time	Team
1	Alex Koslov	Rey Bucanero	18:05	Team International
2	Averno	Sonjay Dutt	23:26	Team Mexico
3	Volador Jr.	Jay Lethal	26:29	Team Mexico
4	Rey Bucanero	A.J. Styles	28:22	Team Mexico
5	Sonjay Dutt	Héctor Garza	30:11	Team International
6	A.J. Styles	Último Guerrero	35:05	Team International
7	Dos Caras Jr.	Marco Corleone	36:28	Team Mexico
8	Jay Lethal	Dr. Wagner Jr.	39:14	Team International
9	Johnny Devine	Shocker	40:59	Team International
10	Héctor Garza	Marco Corleone	42:24	Team Mexico
11	Dr. Wagner Jr.	Alex Shelley	47:22	Team Mexico
12	Marco Corleone	Shocker and Último Guerrero	48:46	Team International
13	Shocker	Chris Sabin and Alex Shelley	51:59	Team Mexico
14	Chris Sabin	Último Guerrero	53:05	Team International
15	Último Guerrero	Alex Shelley	57:37	Team Mexico
16	Alex Shelley (Winner)		57:37	Team International
