= CMLL Super Viernes (September 2012) =

In September 2012 the Mexican professional wrestling promotion Consejo Mundial de Lucha Libre (CMLL) held three CMLL Super Viernes shows, all of which took place in Arena México on Friday nights. On Friday September 14, CMLL held their annual Anniversary Show, replacing the regular Super Viernes show. Some of the matches from Super Viernes are taped for CMLL's weekly shows that air in Mexico the week following the Super Viernes show. The shows features various professional wrestling matches with different wrestlers involved in pre-existing scripted feuds or storylines. Wrestlers portray either villains (referred to as "rudos" in Mexico) or fan favorites ("technicos" in Mexico) as they follow a series of tension-building events, which culminate in a wrestling match or series of matches. Being professional wrestling events matches are not won legitimately; they are instead won via predetermined outcomes to the matches that is kept secret from the general public.

== September 7, 2012 ==
CMLL Super Viernes
- Promotion: Consejo Mundial de Lucha Libre (CMLL)
- Date: September 7, 2012
- City: Mexico City, Mexico
- Venue: Arena México

Event chronology
| ← Previous; Super Viernes August 31, 2012 | Next → CMLL 79th Anniversary Show |

CMLL Super Viernes chronology
| ← Previous; Super Viernes August 31, 2012 | Next → Super Viernes September 21, 2012 |

Consejo Mundial de Lucha Libre's (CMLL) September 7, 2012, Super Viernes Professional wrestling show featured six matches wrestling matches in total. The show featured various professional wrestling matches with different wrestlers involved in pre-existing scripted feuds or storylines. Wrestlers portray either villains (referred to as "rudos" in Mexico) or fan favorites ("technicos" in Mexico). The main event saw the reigning CMLL World Trios Champions El Bufete del Amor ("The Law of Love"), Marco Corleone, Máximo and Rush make their fifth defense since winning the championship. The undercard featured a Torneo cibernetico elimination match between a group of wrestlers from Japan and a group of Mexican wrestlers, with the Japanese team won by cheating. The undercard saw Metalico replace Ángel Azteca, Jr. for unexplained reasons and Estrellita replaced Dark Angel, who was in Japan. In the opening match El Soberano Jr. was injured due to a mistimed move and was carried out of the arena on a stretcher. Soberano Jr. would not wrestle again for over a month.

=== Results ===
| No. | Results | Stipulations |
|---|---|---|
| 1 | Camorra and Inquisidor defeated Soberano Jr. and Horus | Best two out of three falls Tag team match |
| 2 | Los Guerreros Tuareg (Arkangel de la Muerte and Skándalo) and Nosferatu defeated Metalico, Pegasso and Starman | Six-man tag team match |
| 3 | Dalys la Caribeña, Estrellita and Marcela defeated La Amapola, Lady Apache and Tiffany | Six-man tag team match |
| 4 | Euforia defeated Sagrado | Lightning match (One fall, 10 minute time-limit match) |
| 5 | La Ola Amarilla (Hiroshi Tanahashi, Namajague, Okumura and Taichi) defeated Black Warrior, La Mascara, Negro Casas and Valiente | Six-man tag team match |
| 6 | El Bufete del Amor (Marco Corleone, Máximo and Rush) (C) defeated Los Guerreros del Infierno (Dragón Rojo, Jr., Rey Escorpión and Último Guerrero) - Two falls to One | Six-man tag team match for the CMLL World Trios Championship |

=== Torneo Cibernetico order of elimination ===
| Order | Wrestler | Eliminated by |
|---|---|---|
| 1 | Namajague | Valiente |
| 2 | Black Warrior | Taichi |
| 3 | Valiente | Okumura |
| 4 | Okumura | Negro Casas |
| 5 | Negro Casas | Hiroshi Tanahashi |
| 6 | Taichi | La Mascara |
| 7 | La Mascara | Hiroshi Tanahashi |
| 8 | Hiroshi Tanahashi | Winner |

== September 14, 2012 ==
On September 14, 2012, CMLL celebrated their 79th Anniversary with a special show from Arena México instead of their normal Super Viernes show.

== September 21, 2012 ==
CMLL Super Viernes
- Promotion: Consejo Mundial de Lucha Libre (CMLL)
- Date: September 21, 2012
- City: Mexico City, Mexico
- Venue: Arena México

Event chronology
| ← Previous; CMLL 79th Anniversary Show | Next → Super Viernes September 28, 2012 |

CMLL Super Viernes chronology
| ← Previous; Super Viernes September 7, 2012 | Next → Super Viernes September 28, 2012 |

Consejo Mundial de Lucha Libre's (CMLL) September 21, 2012, Super Viernes Professional wrestling show featured six matches wrestling matches in total. The show featured various professional wrestling matches with different wrestlers involved in pre-existing scripted feuds or storylines. Wrestlers portray either villains (referred to as "rudos" in Mexico) or fan favorites ("technicos" in Mexico). The underlying theme of the evening was "CMLL 79th Anniversary Show return match" as two of the matches saw rivals from the 79th Anniversary show on opposite sides.

In the main event a bald El Terrible (teaming Rey Bucanero and Último Guerrero) gained a measure of revenge on the man that forced him to have his hair shaved off a week earlier when he pinned Rush in the main event. The other Anniversary rematch was also the first match Rey Cometa wrestled without a mask, teaming with Hijo del Fantasma and Valiente defeated Puma King, Niebla Roja and Virus with Rey Cometa stealing Puma King's match after the victory. With his pinfall victory over Prince Devitt in the fifth match of the night Dragón Rojo, Jr. made a challenge for a match for the NWA World Historic Middleweight Championship. A match Devitte accepted as a way to revenge the loss he and his team (Blue Panther and La Sombra) suffered at the hands of Dragón Rojo, Jr., Mr. Águila and Taichi.

After the third match CMLL introduced Mexican Paraolympia Patricia Barcenas to the crowd and honored her for winning a Bronze medal in Power lifting in London.

The under card, matches one through three, saw Hombre Bala Jr. and Super Halcón Jr. defeat Bobby Zavala and Disturbio in the opening match and saw Raziel defeat Tritón in 7 minutes and 34 seconds. The rudo team of La Amapola, Princesa Blanca and Tiffany lost to Dalys la Caribeña, Goya Kong and Marcela two falls to one.

=== Results ===
| No. | Results | Stipulations |
|---|---|---|
| 1 | Hombre Bala Jr. and Super Halcón Jr. defeated Bobby Zavala and Disturbio | Best two out of three falls Tag team match |
| 2 | Raziel defeated Tritón | Lightning match (One fall, 10 minute time-limit match) |
| 3 | Dalys la Caribeña, Goya Kong and Marcela defeated La Amapola, Princesa Blanca and Tiffany | Six-man tag team match |
| 4 | Hijo del Fantasma, Rey Cometa and Valiente defeated Niebla Roja, Puma King and Virus | Six-man tag team match |
| 5 | Dragón Rojo Jr., Mr. Águila and Taichi defeated Blue Panther, La Sombra and Prince Devitt | Six-man tag team match |
| 6 | La Fuerza TRT (El Terrible and Rey Bucanero) and Último Guerrero defeated La Mascara, Máximo and Rush | Six-man tag team match |

== September 28, 2012 ==
CMLL Super Viernes
- Promotional poster for the September 28 Super Viernes event
- Promotion: Consejo Mundial de Lucha Libre (CMLL)
- Date: September 28, 2012
- City: Mexico City, Mexico
- Venue: Arena México

CMLL Super Viernes chronology
| ← Previous; Super Viernes September 21, 2012 | Next → Super Viernes October 5, 2012 |

Consejo Mundial de Lucha Libre's (CMLL) September 28, 2012, Super Viernes Professional wrestling show featured six matches wrestling matches in total. The show featured various professional wrestling matches with different wrestlers involved in pre-existing scripted feuds or storylines. Wrestlers portray either villains (referred to as "rudos" in Mexico) or fan favorites ("technicos" in Mexico). The main event was Dragón Rojo, Jr. challenging Prince Devitt for the NWA World Historic Middleweight Championship. The show featured five additional matches.

=== Under card ===
The opening match was a Tag Team match between the Tecnico team of Metalico and Leono facing the Rudo team of Zayco and Taurus. This was one of Metalico's first matches back after being unable to compete for a couple of months due to a broken leg. It was also one of Zayco's first matches back in the ring after recovering from being stabbed in the back and almost passing away from the attack. Earlier in 2012 CMLL had announced the Generacion 2012 group, a number of rookies who made their CMLL wrestling debut in 2012, of those Taurus was the last to make his Arena México debut. The Tecnico team won the first fall, with their opponents quickly winning the second fall to even the match between the two sides. In the final fall Metalico landed awkwardly from a leaping move off the top rope and ended up hurting his leg. Leono had to wrestle the rest of the match by himself as Metalico was taken to the hospital on a stretcher. Despite the two on one disadvantage Leono captured the third fall and the victory for his team. Metalico was later diagnose with a torn ligament in his knee.

The second match of the evening featured CMLL's Mini-Estrellas division and centered on the ongoing storyline between the experienced Fantasy and the newcomer Mercurio, who at the time had already signed the contract for a Lucha de Apuestas, mask vs. mask match for October 14, 2012. Fantasy led the team of Shockercito and Acero (formerly known as Nino de Acero, or "Boy of Steel") against Mercurio and fellow Rudos Pequeño Black Warrior and Pequeño Violencia. The first two falls were split between the teams without too many clashes between the Fantasy and Mercurio, while the third fall, the longest of the match, saw the two rivals repeatably trying to unmask each other, tearing the fabric apart in one instance. Fantasy took the victory by pulling Mercurio's mask off while the referee was not looking (it is an automatic disqualification in Lucha Libre) and then pinned Mercurio as he was trying to cover up his face. After the match Mercurio remasked and then started to bad mouth his opponent over the P.A. system as he claimed he would ultimately get revenge on Fantasy by unmasking him.

The third match was featured yet another chapter in the storyline feud between Rey Cometa and Puma King that had seen Puma King win a Lucha de Apuesta to unmask Rey Cometa at CMLL's 79th Anniversary Show two weeks prior. on September 28, Cometa teamed up with veteran Blue Panther and Máscara Dorada in what was Dorada's first Super Viernes match after a two-week tour of Japan. Puma King teamed up with Sangre Azteca and Vangelis, two wrestlers he does not regularly team up with. Cometa pinned Puma King to win the first fall, pulling Puma King's mask to leave him vulnerable for the loss. Puma King's team took the second fall to even the score. The third and final fall saw Blue Panther for Sangre Azteca to submit for the team victory.

The Lightning match, a singles match with a 10-minute time limit, saw old rivals Máximo and Taichi clash once more. The rivalry between the two developed in late May 2010 with the storyline being that Taichi was disgusted by Maximo's overtly homosexual in-ring antics when Máximo kissed Taichi during a match, resulting in Taichi retaliating by kicking Máximo in the groin. The two met in a Lucha de Apuesta, hair vs. hair match on June 6, 2010, in the main event of CMLL's 2010 Sin Salida show, which Máximo won two falls to one. The two would clash again, this time in Taichi's home promotion NJPW during the Fantastica Mania 2011 where Taichi would win the match. The following year at the Fantastica Mania 2012 Maximo teamed up with Danshoku Dino in a losing effort against Taichi and Taka Michinoku. At the September 28 Super Viernes rivalry was reignited as they had a very intense, physical match. At one point Taichi had to be helped back to the ring after wrestling on the floor outside the ring. The crowd was very vocally behind Maximo as he defeated his rival in around 8 minutes of wrestling.

=== Semi-Main Event ===
The underlying storyline of the semi-main event, or fifth match of the evening was not so much between the teams of Atlantis, Diamante Azul and Místico II and their opponents Último Guerrero, Euforia and Rey Escorpión (all part of Los Guerreros del Infierno) but instead centered on the internal struggle of Los Guerreros themselves. Earlier in the year Rey Escorpión had a fall out, especially with Último Guerrero and at one point Rey Escorpión was officially kicked out of Los Guerreros del Infierno and replaced with Euforia and Niebla Roja as his replacements. In the weeks and months following Escorpión still teamed up with Último Guerrero and other Guerreros. They even won a tournament to earn them a match for the CMLL World Trios Championship. The following week the tension erupted as miscommunication cause the team to lose to the trios champions El Bufete del Amor (Marco Corleon, Máximo and Rush). On September 28 the long-building animosity between Rey Escorpión and Los Guerreros del Infierno was evident throughout the match, from the start Escorpión came out separately from Guerrero and Euforia. During the match Místico II suffered what one report called "a spectacular fall" in an attempt to pull off a high risk, high flying move off the top rope. Los Guerreros del Infierno actually won the first fall, then quickly lost the second fall. In the third fall the team disintegrated, with miscommunication between the three and Escorpión losing the third and deciding fall to their opponents. After the match Guerrero and Euroria attacked Rey Escorpión, beating him up and leaving him in the ring, marking the first time that the tension between Escorpión and Guerrero turned so physical.

=== Main Event ===
The main event of the September 27, 2012 Super Viernes was a match for the NWA World Historic Middleweight Championship as the champion Prince Devitt defended against challenger Dragón Rojo, Jr. Devitt was not a regular CMLL competitor but touring Mexico as part of CMLL's talent sharing agreement with the Japanese wrestling promotion New Japan Pro-Wrestling. Dragón Rojo, Jr. had earned the title shot through victories over Prince Devitt in the weeks leading up to the September 27, 2012 Super Viernes, at CMLL's 79th Anniversary Show Dragón teamed up with Último Guerrero and Negro Casas to defeat Devitt, Atlantis and Místico II. At the September 21, 2012 Super Viernes show Dragón Rojo pinned Prince Devitt in the deciding fall of a six-man tag match that saw Dragón Rojo team with Mr. Águila and Taichi to defeat Devitt, La Sombra and Blue Panther.

Devitt had Máscara Dorada in his corner while Dragón Rojo, Jr. was accompanied by Tony Salazar, with no real explanation of why Salazar accompanied Rojo. The first fall of the match started out with a technical display by both competitors until Prince Devitt managed to score the first fall on Rojo. Dragón Rojo came back strong in the second fall, making for a more physical fight that almost saw both competitors disqualified for being outside the ring for too long. In the end Dragón Rojo, Jr. scored the pinfall to even the match at one fall each. The third fall saw a series of pinfall attempts with Rojo reversing a pinfall and scoring the deciding third fall, earning him the NWA World Historic Middleweight Championship. With the victory Dragón Rojo, Jr. became a double Middlweight Champion as he also held the CMLL World Middleweight Championship.

=== Results ===
| No. | Results | Stipulations |
|---|---|---|
| 1 | Metalico and Leono defeated Zayco and Taurus | Best two out of three falls Tag team match |
| 2 | Fantasy, Shockercito and Acero defeated Mercurio, Pequeño Black Warrior and Pequeño Violencia | Six-man tag team match |
| 3 | Blue Panther, Máscara Dorada and Rey Cometa defeated Sangre Azteca. Puma King and Vangelis | Six-man tag team match |
| 4 | Máximo defeated Taichi | Lightning match (One fall, 10 minute time-limit match) |
| 5 | Atlantis, Diamante Azul and Místico II defeated Los Guerreros del Infierno (Último Guerrero, Euforia and Rey Escorpión) | Six-man tag team match |
| 6 | Dragón Rojo, Jr. defeated Prince Devitt (C) | Best two out of three falls match for the NWA World Historic Middleweight Championship |
