= CMLL Super Viernes (August 2012) =

In August 2012 the Mexican professional wrestling promotion Consejo Mundial de Lucha Libre (CMLL) held five CMLL Super Viernes shows, all of which took place in Arena México on Friday nights. Some of the matches from Super Viernes are taped for CMLL's weekly shows that air in Mexico the week following the Super Viernes show. The shows features various professional wrestling matches with different wrestlers involved in pre-existing scripted feuds or storylines. Wrestlers portray either villains (referred to as "rudos" in Mexico) or fan favorites ("técnicos" in Mexico) as they follow a series of tension-building events, which culminate in a wrestling match or series of matches.

== August 3, 2012 ==
CMLL Super Viernes
- Official poster for the August 3, Super Viernes
- Promotion: Consejo Mundial de Lucha Libre (CMLL)
- Date: August 3, 2012
- City: Mexico City, Mexico
- Venue: Arena México
- Attendance: 12,600

CMLL Super Viernes chronology
← Previous; Super Viernes July 27, 2012	Next → Super Viernes August 10, 2012

Consejo Mundial de Lucha Libre's (CMLL) August 3, 2012 Super Viernes show featured six matches. The most talked about match of the night was not the main event CMLL World Tag Team Championship defense by Los Guerreros del Infierno (Dragón Rojo Jr. and Último Guerrero) against Atlantis and Diamante Azul, instead it was the scheduled debut of the Ring persona Místico or rather Místico La Nueva Era as CMLL gave the name, mask and persona of their most successful luchador ever, Místico to a new wrestler, a man who had previously worked as "Dragon Lee" in CMLL. While Místico was in the fourth match of the night fans came to see the debut of Místico "La Nueva Era" ("The New Era") and attendance figures went up between 4,000 and 6,000. The show featured four additional matches, three of which were Best two-out-of-three falls six-man "Lucha Libre rules" tag team match and a Lightning Match, a one on one match with a one fall, 10 minute time limit.

=== Event ===
The opening match pitted the técnico team of Molotov, Starman and Tigre Blanco against Los Guerreros Tuareg (Arkangel de la Muerte and Skándalo) and Nosferatu. The Rudo team won two falls to one. In the second match the Japanese team La Fiebre Amarilla ("The Yellow Fever") of Namajague and Okumura teamed up with Misterioso Jr. to take on the trio of Diamante, Fuego and Tritón. During the match Delta landed awkwardly after a high risk move and had to be removed from the ring on a stretcher. Fuego would pin Misterioso Jr. to win the third fall, which along with a victory in the first fall gave Fuego and his team the victory. CMLL normally includes a Lighting Match on their Super Viernes show unless they have a special reason to leave it out, and the August 3 edition did indeed feature a Lightning Match, pitting the Rudo veteran El Felino against the young, high-flying tecnico Stuka Jr. The two wrestled a very fast paced match which ultimately saw El Felino pin Stuka Jr.

=== La Nueva Era ===
The fourth match saw the debut of Dragon Lee as the new Místico, taking over the mask and name of CMLL's most successful wrestler ever, the original Místico. Místico was accompanied by Fray Tormenta, the "Wrestling Priest", who had also acted as the Padrino (Literally Godfather") of the original Místico, giving his official blessing to the new Místico before the match. The new Místico teamed up with Valiente and Ángel de Oro, who had originally been offered the role of the new Místico but declined. The team would face Los Hijos del Averno ("The Sons of Hell"; Ephesto and Mephisto) and Euforia. Los Hijos del Averno had been constant rivals with the original Místico and had worked together in a series of very well received and profitable matches. La Nuevo Era Místico did not have an easy debut as the Rudo trio ganged up on him and actually attacked him so brutally that the team was disqualified to lose the first fall. In the second fall Los Hijos pinned both Valiente and Ángel de Oro, but not Místico as the team took the second fall. The final fall did not involve Místico at all as Ángel de Oro forced Mephisto to submit for the victory. Following the match Los Hijos attacked Místico again, tearing his mask open. Following the match Místico rated his own effort as a "7 out of 10" and noted that while it was not a perfect debut he still considered it successful. The official CMLL website described the debut as "excellent"

=== Semi-Main Event ===
Leading up to the fifth match of the evening Volador Jr. and Mr. Niebla had been unable to get along and their trios match which also included Negro Casas on their side was no different. The internal strife made it easier for Máscara Dorada, Maximo and Shocker to win the match as they took two straight falls, winning two to zero due to Volador Jr. and Mr. Niebla fighting amongst themselves. After the match was over Mr. Niebla and his companion Zacarias attacked Volador Jr. allowing weeks of frustration to be expressed physically instead. At first Negro Casas tried to keep the peace between the two, but finally ended up siding with his La Peste Negra teammate Mr. Niebla as they tried to unmask Volador Jr. after the match. Once the two had been separated by arena security Volador Jr. made a challenge to Mr. Niebla to face him in a Lucha de Apuestas match with both Masks at stake. Mr. Niebla refused to even answer the challenge but instead left the arena along with Negro Casas.

=== Main Event ===
The main event was billed as the 22nd CMLL World Tag Team Championship defense by the team of Dragón Rojo Jr. and Último Guerrero, just short of the record 25 title defenses Último Guerrero and Rey Bucanero had achieved a few years prior. The team had to fend off the team of Atlantis and Diamante Azul, who had teamed in Trios matches, but not as a regular Tag Team at this point in time. The match started out as a clean, very technical match which saw Atlantis and Diamante Azul display a great deal of teamwork that allowed the challengers to take the first fall in quick order, putting the champions on the defensive. The champions regrouped in the second fall with Guerrero focusing on Atlantis and Dragón Rojo Jr. worked over Diamante Azul, allowing them to even the match and force a third and deciding fall. The third fall saw a number of close calls as both teams fought hard to gain the victory. At one point Último Guerrero had Atlantis on the top rope, ready to perform his" Guerrero Special" move when Dragón Rojo Jr. threw Diamante Azul into the ring ropes, shaking them enough for Último Guerrero to lose his footing and fall to the canvas. Moments later Atlantis pinned Guerrero to win his fifth overall CMLL World Tag Team Championship. After the match the now former champions began arguing between them, blaming each other for the title loss.

=== Results ===
No.	Results	Stipulations	Times
1	Los Guerreros Tuareg (Arkangel de la Muerte and Skándalo) and Nosferatu defeated Molotov, Starman and Tigre Blanco	Best two-out-of-three falls six-man "Lucha Libre rules" tag team match	—
2	Diamante, Fuego and Tritón defeated La Fiebre Amarilla (Namajague and Okumura) and Misterioso Jr. - Two falls to One	Best two-out-of-three falls six-man "Lucha Libre rules" tag team match	—
3	El Felino defeated Stuka Jr.	Lightning match (One fall, 10 minute time-limit match)	07:00
4	Ángel de Oro, Místico La Nueva Era and Valiente defeated Los Hijos del Averno (Ephesto and Mephisto) and Euforia - Two falls to One	Best two-out-of-three falls six-man "Lucha Libre rules" tag team match	—
5	Máscara Dorada, Maximo and Shocker defeated Mr. Niebla, Negro Casas and Volador Jr. - Two falls to Zero	Best two out of three falls Six-man tag team match	—
6	Atlantis and Diamante Azul defeated Los Guerreros del Infierno (Dragón Rojo Jr. and Último Guerrero) (C) - Two falls to One	Two Out Of Three Falls Tag Team Match for the CMLL World Tag Team Championship	—

== August 10, 2012 ==
CMLL Super Viernes
- Promotion: Consejo Mundial de Lucha Libre (CMLL)
- Date: August 10, 2012
- City: Mexico City, Mexico
- Venue: Arena México

CMLL Super Viernes chronology
← Previous; Super Viernes August 3, 2012	Next → Super Viernes August 17, 2012

Consejo Mundial de Lucha Libre's (CMLL) August 10, 2012 Super Viernes show featured six matches wrestling matches in total. The main event for the show, El Felino, Mr. Niebla and Negro Casas (Collectively known as La Peste Negra, "the Black Plague") faced off against Mr. Águila, Psicosis and Volador Jr. who are also known as Los Invasores ("The Invaders") and was a direct result of a match from the previous week where Mr. Niebla and Volador Jr. were unable to get along in their Tag Team match and actually fought each other after the match was over. In the Semi-Main event CMLL's recently introduced Nueva Era ("New Era") Místico teamed up with veteran tecnico (good guy) Atlantis and one of CMLL's top, young tecnicos La Mascara to face off against the Rudo (bad guy) team known as Los Guerreros del Infierno ("The Warriors from Hell", Dragón Rojo Jr., Euforia and Último Guerrero) The show featured four additional matches including a Tag Team match, a Lightning Match (singles match with a 10-minute time limit) and two Best two out of three falls Six-man tag team match.

=== Event ===
The opening match of the show was the technico team of Hombre Bala Jr. and Super Halcón Jr. face off against Bobby Zavala and Disturbio in a Tag Team match. Zavala and Disturbio overcame their opponents two falls to one to take the match. In the second match Puma King cost his team (Puma, Raziel and Sangre Azteca) the match in two straight falls as he pulled Rey Cometa's mask off in clear view of the referee who disqualified Puma King and awarded the second fall to the team of Rey Cometa, Fuego and Tritón. Rey Cometa and Puma King had been involved in a long running rivalry, where this was just the latest development between the two. Following the match Rey Cometa challenged Puma King to put his mask on the line against him. The third match of the evening, which saw Lady Apache and Las Ladies de Polanco (Princesa Blanca and Princesa Sujei) face off against the team of Dark Angel, Goya Kong and Luna Magica, centered around the developing rivalry between Dark Angel and Lady Apache, which only intensified when Lady Apache cheated by holding the ropes to gain the third and deciding fall for her team. The Lightning Match saw the seasoned veteran Rudo Rey Bucanero cheat his way to a victory over Ángel de Oro with very little time left on the clock. During the show CMLL Announced that they would start the 2012 Campeonato Universal (Universal Championship) tournament on August 17 and would span the August 17, August 24 and August 31 Super Viernes show.

The fifth match of the evening centered around the ongoing promotional push behind the new Místico, who replaced the Original Místico. On the night La Nueva Era Místico teamed up with Atlantis and La Mascara for a Best two out of three falls Six-man tag team match against the team of Los Guerreros del Infierno (Dragón Rojo Jr., Euforia and Último Guerrero). A second storyline, unrelated to the introduction of La Nuevo Era Místico focused on the internal problems of Los Guerreros del Infierno, building on Guerrero and Dragón Rojo Jr. losing the CMLL World Tag Team Championship to Atlantis and Diamante Azul the previous week. During the match Guerrero and Dragón Rojo Jr. would often argue and not work as a unit. In the end Místico incapacitated Último Guerrero while Atlantis pinned Euforia to win the match. After the match Guerrero and Dragón Rojo Jr. got into an argument that turned into a shoving match, but never went beyond that.

=== Main Event ===
While the main event saw two of CMLL's top Rudo factions face off as La Peste Negra faced off against Los Invasores, the storyline centered more around the building rivalry between Mr. Niebla of La Peste Negra and Volador Jr. of Los Invasores. At the previous week's Super Viernes the two had teamed up, but due to infighting between the two their team lost the match. Mr. Niebla allied himself with El Felino and Negro Casas while Volador Jr. teamed up with Mr. Águila and Psicosis, pitting two experienced teams against each other. La Peste Negra took the first fall, while Los Invasores cheated their way to taking the second fall. During the third fall Mr. Niebla began tearing Volador Jr.'s super hero inspired outfit apart, almost stripping Volador Jr. of his shirt as well as tearing at Volador Jr.'s mask. After a long period of the advantage switching back and forth between the two teams La Peste Negra distracted the referee, allowing Mr. Niebla to use an illegal low blow on Volador Jr. and pin him for the third and final fall. After the match an enraged Volador Jr. openly challenged Mr. Niebla to aLucha de Apuestas match where both wrestlers would risk their Masks. Like the previous week Mr. Niebla declined the challenge at that point in time.

=== Results ===
No.	Results	Stipulations
1	Hombre Bala Jr. and Super Halcón Jr. defeated Bobby Zavala and Disturbio	Best two out of three falls tag team match
2	Fuego, Rey Cometa and Tritón defeated Puma King, Raziel and Sangre Azteca - Two falls to Zero	Best two out of three falls Six-man tag team match
3	Lady Apache and Las Ladies de Polanco (Princesa Blanca and Princesa Sujei) defeated Dark Angel, Goya Kong and Luna Magica	Best two out of three falls Six-man tag team match
4	Rey Bucanero defeated Ángel de Oro	Lightning match (One fall, 10 minute time-limit match)
5	Atlantis, La Mascara and Místico La Nueva Era defeated Los Guerreros del Infierno (Dragón Rojo Jr., Euforia and Último Guerrero)	Best two out of three falls Six-man tag team match
6	La Peste Negra (El Felino, Mr. Niebla and Negro Casas) defeated Los Invasores (Mr. Águila, Psicosis and Volador Jr.) - Two falls to One	Best two out of three falls Six-man tag team match

== August 17, 2012 ==
CMLL Super Viernes
- Promotion: Consejo Mundial de Lucha Libre (CMLL)
- Date: August 17, 2012
- City: Mexico City, Mexico
- Venue: Arena México

CMLL Super Viernes chronology
← Previous; Super Viernes August 10, 2012	Next → Super Viernes August 24, 2012

Consejo Mundial de Lucha Libre's (CMLL) August 17, 2012 Super Viernes show featured twelve matches wrestling matches in total and hosted the first qualifying block of the 2012 Campeon Universal Del CMLL Tournament where eight of CMLL's reigning champions would face off for a spot in the final match of the tournament. The tournament itself contained 7 matches and an additional seeding Battle royal match, used to determine the match-ups in the tournament. The order of elimination determined who would face off against each other and when – the first two wrestlers eliminated would face off, then the next two and the next two, with the final two men in the ring facing off in the last of the opening round matches. The show featured four additional matches, including a main event Singles match between Mr. Niebla and Volador Jr. playing off their developing scripted feud that had started a few weeks earlier.

=== Event ===
In the opening match the CMLL World Mini-Estrella Champion Pequeño Olímpico and the Distrito Federal Lightweight Champion Demus 3:16 formed a formidable team and proved to be too much for Aereo and Astral who lost two falls to one when Demus and Pequeño Olímpico won the first and the last fall. Rey Cometa had back up in for the form of the holders of the CMLL Arena Coliseo Tag Team Championship, Fuego and Stuka Jr. in his ongoing battle with Puma King. Up until this point in time Puma King had used underhanded tactics to gain him several victories over his rival and was looking forward to doing the same on this night as he teamed up with La Fiebre Amarilla ("The Yellow Fever") consisting of Namajague and Okumura. The underhanded tactics actually cost Puma King's team the first fall as they were disqualified for cheating. The second match saw Puma King continue to gain an unfair advantage, only for Rey Cometa to use the La Casita roll-up move on Tiger King and pinned him to take the match two falls to none. Following the match Rey Cometa challenged Tiger King to put his mask on the line in a Lucha de Apuestas at a future date. Puma King sarcastically accepted, but only if it could take place in an empty arena, a ploy to get out of the match.

The third match of the evening the "New Era" Místico teamed up with CMLL World Tag Team Champion Diamante Azul and Valiente as they took on Dragón Rojo Jr. and Los Hijos del Averno (Ephesto and Mephisto) in a Best two out of three falls Six-man tag team match. Místico kept his undefeated streak alive as he was not the wrestler pinned when Los Hijos took the first fall of the match, nor was he involved in the second fall when his team evened the match between them at one fall a piece. The third fall saw El Nuevo Principle de Plata y Oro ("The New Prince of Silver and Gold") force Mephisto to submit as he applied an arm scissors. One source commented that La Nuevo Era Místico put on "a great fight" while focusing primarily on Mephisto Following the third match Averno, Mephisto and Ephesto introduced the crowd to Alejandra Orozco, Germán Sánchez and Iván García, three Mexican Olympic medal winners from the 2012 Olympic Games. During their presentation Germán Sánchez climbed the ropes in the ring and bounced on them, a gesture that was appreciated by the fans in attendance.

=== Universal Championship: Block A ===
CMLL started the 2012 Campeon Universal Del CMLL Tournament with a seeding Battle royal, a method they commonly use to determine the match ups and order of first round matches in most of their tournaments. In order to qualify for the Campeon Universal tournament a wrestler must hold a CMLL promoted or CMLL recognized championship at the time the tournament starts. Block A consisted of the following champions:

Participant	Championship held
Atlantis	CMLL World Tag Team Championship
Black Warrior	Mexican National Trios Championship
Máscara Dorada	CMLL World Welterweight Championship
Mr. Águila	Mexican National Trios Championship
Negro Casas	NWA World Historic Welterweight Championship
Rey Bucanero	NWA World Historic Light Heavyweight Championship
Rush	CMLL World Light Heavyweight Championship; CMLL World Trios Championship
El Terrible	CMLL World Heavyweight Championship

The battle royal saw Atlantis and Negro Casas as the last to wrestlers in the ring, meaning that they would face off in the last of the four first round matches that immediately followed the Battle Royal. The first round matches were all quick, under or around four minutes per match. In the first round Máscara Dorada defeated Black Warrior, El Terrible defeated Mr. Águila, Rush defeated Rey Bucanero and in the final first round match Atlantis defeated Negro Casas. The second round matches were a bit longer, but still relatively short compared to non-tournament matches. In the second round El Terrible defeated Máscara Dorada and Rush defeated Atlantis, which meant that the long time rivals El Terrible and Rush would meet in the semi-final match. The semi-finals match was longer and also more intense as the long-standing rivalry made both men work extra hard to gain the upper hand. El Terrible took the victory and the spot in the final and then made a challenge to Rush to put his hair on the line in a Lucha de Apuestas ("Bet Match") against El Terrible. Rush accepted the challenge and was subsequently attacked by El Terrible's team mate Rey Bucanero, who hit Rush over the head with a steel folding chair. Following the attack Rush, emphasizing the effects of the attack, was taken out of the arena on a stretch.

=== Main Event ===
The Main Event was a continuation of a storyline that had gotten very heated, very quickly as Volador Jr. and Mr. Niebla faced off in a singles match between the two. In previous weeks the two had fought, tearing at each other's masks and brutalizing each other whenever they got the chance; this match was no different. The action even included Mije and Zacarias, the Mascotas (little people in brightly colored costumes) as both Mije and Zacarias interfered in the match and tried to gain an advantage for their side. In the third and deciding fall Volador Jr. pulled Mr. Niebla's mask off, hoping to gain an advantage by the distraction, but Mr. Niebla had prepared for such a ploy and had his face wrapped in bandages under the mask so his bare face was not exposed. When the referee caught Volador Jr. with Mr. Niebla's mask in his hands he immediately called for the disqualification as it is illegal to take an opponent's mask off under Lucha Libre rules. For the third week in a row Volador Jr. challenged Mr. Niebla to a mask vs. mask match and for the third week in a row Mr. Niebla decline the challenge, stating Volador Jr. was not worthy of it.

=== Results ===
No.	Results	Stipulations
1	Demus 3:16 and Pequeño Olímpico defeated Aereo and Astral - Two falls to One	Best two out of three falls tag team match
2	Fuego, Rey Cometa and Stuka Jr. defeated La Fiebre Amarilla (Namajague and Okumura) and Puma King - Two falls to Zero	Best two out of three falls Six-man tag team match
3	Diamante Azul, Místico La Nueva Era and Valiente defeated Dragón Rojo Jr. and Los Hijos del Averno (Ephesto and Mephisto) - Two falls to One	Best two out of three falls Six-man tag team match
4	Atlantis and Negro Casas defeated Black Warrior, El Terrible, Máscara Dorada, Mr. Águila, Rey Bucanero and Rush	Campeon Universal Del CMLL 2012 Seeding Battle royal
5	Máscara Dorada defeated Black Warrior	Campeon Universal Del CMLL 2012 Tournament First Round Match
6	El Terrible defeated Mr. Águila	Campeon Universal Del CMLL 2012 Tournament First Round Match
7	Rush defeated Rey Bucanero	Campeon Universal Del CMLL 2012 Tournament First Round Match
8	Atlantis defeated Negro Casas	Campeon Universal Del CMLL 2012 Tournament First Round Match
9	El Terrible defeated Máscara Dorada	Campeon Universal Del CMLL 2012 Quarter Final Match
10	Rush defeated Atlantis	Campeon Universal Del CMLL 2012 Quarter Final Match
11	El Terrible defeated Rush	Campeon Universal Del CMLL 2012 Tournament Semi Final Match
12	Mr. Niebla defeated Volador Jr. - Two falls to One by disqualification	Best two-out-of-three falls match

== August 24, 2012 ==
CMLL Super Viernes
- Official poster for the August 24, 2012 Super Viernes Show
- Promotion: Consejo Mundial de Lucha Libre (CMLL)
- Date: August 24, 2012
- City: Mexico City, Mexico
- Venue: Arena México

CMLL Super Viernes chronology
← Previous; Super Viernes August 17, 2012	Next → Super Viernes August 31, 2012

Consejo Mundial de Lucha Libre's (CMLL) August 24, 2012 Super Viernes show featured twelve matches wrestling matches in total and hosted the second qualifying block of the 2012 Campeon Universal Del CMLL Tournament where eight of CMLL's reigning champions would face off for a spot in the final match of the tournament. The tournament itself contained 7 matches and an additional seeding Battle royal match, used to determine the match-ups in the tournament. The order of elimination determined who would face off against each other and when – the first two wrestlers eliminated would face off, then the next two and the next two, with the final two men in the ring facing off in the last of the opening round matches. The show featured four additional matches including the main event of La Fuerza TRT (El Terrible and Rey Bucanero) and Último Guerrero Facing the team of La Sombra, Rush and Shocker as El Terrible and Rush continued to build escalate the storyline that was set to culminate at the CMLL 79th Anniversary Show.

=== Event ===
The show started out with the team of Camaleon and Starman taking on the brother team known as Los Hombres del Camoflaje (Artillero and Super Comando, two wrestlers with Military themed ring characters). While Camaleon and Starman were not as used to teaming together as Los Hombres del Camoflaje they still managed to win both the first and the third fall to take the victory. Dark Angel was originally announced as a participant in the second match, but since she was actually in Japan wrestling she had to be replaced. Originally CMLL announced that Lluvia would take her place, but on the night of the event Dalys la Caribeña took her place and teamed up with Estrellita and Luna Magica that team faced off against Lady Apache, La Seductora and Zeuxis in the first Best two out of three falls Six-man tag team match of the night. In the end the quickly thrown together team of Dalys, Estrellita and Luna Magica defeated their opponents after winning falls one and three. The third match of the evening was a "Lightning Match", a one fall match with a 10-minute time limit between the CMLL World Welterweight Champion Máscara Dorada and Mephisto. The match went 8 minutes and 32 seconds before Mephisto took the victory when he managed to Máscara Dorada apply his signature 'Demon Driller (Double underhook facebuster) move and then pin him for the three count.

=== Universal Championship: Block B ===
CMLL started the 2012 Campeon Universal Del CMLL Tournament with a seeding Battle royal, a method they commonly use to determine the match ups and order of first round matches in most of their tournaments. In order to qualify for the Campeon Universal tournament a wrestler must hold a CMLL promoted or CMLL recognized championship at the time the tournament starts. For the 2012 Hiroshi Tanahashi participated, representing New Japan Pro-Wrestling instead of CMLL. Of the current CMLL champions at the time Virus (CMLL World Super Lightweight Championship)and Prince Devitt (NWA World Historic Middleweight Championship) did not compete. Block B consisted of the following champions:

Participant	Championship held
Diamante Azul	CMLL World Tag Team Championship
Dragón Rojo Jr.	CMLL World Middleweight Championship
Marco Corleone	CMLL World Trios Championship
La Máscara	Mexican National Light Heavyweight Championship
Máximo	CMLL World Trios Championship
Pólvora	Mexican National Welterweight Championship
Hiroshi Tanahashi	IWGP World Heavyweight Championship
Volador Jr.	Mexican National Trios Championship

The battle royal saw Maximo and Volador Jr. as the last to wrestlers in the ring, meaning that they would face off in the last of the four first round matches that immediately followed the Battle Royal. In the first round Hiroshi Tanahashi defeated Marco Corleone in just 2 minutes and 30 seconds, Diamante Azul defeated Pólvora in 6:53 (the longest match of the first round), La Mascara defeated Dragón Rojo Jr. in 4:46 and finally Volador Jr. defeated Maximo in just 1:17 (the shortest match of the entire tournament. In the second round Diamante Azul almost eliminated the IWGP champion Tanahashi after executing a German Suplex, but Tanahashi managed to win the match in 4:59. In the second second-round match Volador Jr. too 4 minutes and 50 seconds to defeat La Mascara. The semi-final match between Hiroshi Tanahashi and Volador Jr. was the longest tournament match of the night with 8 minutes, ending when Tanahashi qualified for the final the next week against El Terrible.

=== Main Event ===
The Main Event of the August 24th Super Viernes was a continuation of a long running scripted feud between the tecnico (someone who plays the "good guy") Rush and the rudo (someone who plays the "bad guy") El Terrible. At this point in time the two had already agreed to wager their hair in a Lucha de Apuestas ("Bet match") that was going to be the Main Event of the CMLL 79th Anniversary Show on September 7, 2012. For this match Rush teamed up with La Sombra and Shocker, while El Terrible teamed up with fellow La Fuerza TRT ("The TRT Power") member Rey Bucanero and Último Guerrero. The tension between the two was played up to such a degree that Rush cost his team the first fall as he was disqualified due to excessive violence. In the second fall El Terrible outwitted his opponent and pinned Rush to give his team the two falls to nothing victory.

=== Results ===
No.	Results	Stipulations	Times
1	Camaleon and Starman defeated Los Hombres del Camoflaje (Artillero and Super Comando)	Best two out of three falls tag team match	—
2	Dalys la Caribeña, Estrellita and Luna Magica defeated Lady Apache, La Seductora and Zeuxis - Two falls to One	Best two out of three falls Six-man tag team match	—
3	Mephisto defeated Máscara Dorada	Lightning match (One fall, 10 minute time-limit match)	08:32
4	Maximo and Volador Jr. defeated Diamante Azul, Dragón Rojo Jr., Hiroshi Tanahashi, La Mascara, Marco Corleone and Pólvora	Battle Royal	—
5	Hiroshi Tanahashi defeated Marco Corleone	Campeon Universal Del CMLL 2012 Tournament First Round Match	02:30
6	Diamante Azul defeated Pólvora	Campeon Universal Del CMLL 2012 Tournament First Round Match	06:53
7	La Mascara defeated Dragón Rojo Jr.	Campeon Universal Del CMLL 2012 Tournament First Round Match	04:46
8	Volador Jr. defeated Maximo	Campeon Universal Del CMLL 2012 Tournament First Round Match	01:17
9	Hiroshi Tanahashi defeated Diamante Azul	Campeon Universal Del CMLL 2012 Tournament Quarter Final Match	04:59
10	Volador Jr. defeated La Mascara	Campeon Universal Del CMLL 2012 Tournament Quarter Final Match	04:50
11	Hiroshi Tanahashi defeated Volador Jr.	Campeon Universal Del CMLL 2012 Tournament Semi Final Match	08:00
12	La Fuerza TRT (El Terrible and Rey Bucanero) and Último Guerrero defeated La Sombra, Rush and Shocker - Two falls to Zero	Best two out of three falls Six-man tag team match	—

== August 31, 2012 ==
CMLL Super Viernes
- Official poster advertising the finals of the 2012 Universal Championship tournament
- Promotion: Consejo Mundial de Lucha Libre (CMLL)
- Date: August 31, 2012
- City: Mexico City, Mexico
- Venue: Arena México

CMLL Super Viernes chronology
← Previous; Super Viernes August 27, 2012	Next → Super Viernes September 7, 2012

Consejo Mundial de Lucha Libre's (CMLL) August 31, 2012 Super Viernes show featured eight matches wrestling matches in total including the finals of the 2012 Campeon Universal Del CMLL as well as a one night, four team trios match called a Cuadrangular de Tercias tournament. The tournament itself contained 3 matches and an additional seeding Battle royal match, used to determine the match-ups in the tournament. A representative of each team competed in the match to determine the order of elimination – the teams that the first two wrestlers eliminated represented would have to face off and the two wrestlers remaining in the ring would compete in the second tournament match. The show featured three additional matches on the undercard.

=== Event ===
The first match of the evening saw the rudo (someone who plays the "bad guy") team of Apocalipsis and Inquisidor defeat the tecnico (someone who plays the "good guy") team of Bengala and Leono two falls to one. The second match of the night featured CMLL's Mini-Estrella division as then CMLL World Mini-Estrella Champion Pequeño Olímpico teamed up with fellow RudosDemus 3:16 and Pequeño Nitro to take on Astral, Pequeño Halcon and Último Dragóncito. The two teams each took a fall, forcing them to go to the third and deciding fall of the match, during which both Último Dragóncito and Astral were hurt after taking a move from Demus 3:16 and Pequeño Halcon had to work the closing moments of the match alone, losing in quick fashion. After the match the seemingly hurt Mini Luchadors' had to be taken from the ring on stretchers. In the third fall the outcome of the match itself, the team of Guerrero Maya Jr., Rey Cometa and Stuka Jr. defeated Misterioso Jr., Niebla Roja and Puma King, was less important than the actions after the match. Both Rey Cometa and Puma King spoke at length about their problems with each other, finally agreeing to a Luchas de Apuestas "Mask vs. mask" between the two for the CMLL 79th Anniversary Show. Once the match was accepted by both parties Rey Cometa jumped his hated rival and de-masked him to demonstrate what would happen in the just agreed on "mask vs. mask" match.

=== Cuadrangular de Tercias Tournament ===
Next on the show was a Cuadrangular de Tercias ("Four Trio Teams") tournament that involved four trios team, with no specific prize announced for the winners. The teams were: CMLL World Trios Championship holders El Bufete del Amor ("The Law of Love") Marco Corleone, Maximo and Rush, La Peste Negra ("The Black Plague" El Felino and Negro Casas) teaming up with former Peste Negra member Rey Bucanero, Los Guerreros del Infierno ("The Infernal Warriors" Dragón Rojo Jr. and Último Guerrero) teaming up with former Guerrero Rey Escorpión and finally Los Invasores (Mr. Águila and Olímpico) teaming up with Black Warrior. First Felino, Maximo, Rey Escorpión and Olímpico represented their teams in a seeding Battle royal, a method they commonly use to determine the match ups and order of first round matches in most of their tournaments. El Felino and Rey Escorpión defeat Maximo and Olímpico which meant that Maximo's and Olímpico's teams would have to face off in the first match while El Felino's and Rey Escorpión's teams would compete in the second match of the tournament. The first actual tournament match saw Corleone, Maximo and Rush defeat Los Invasores and Black Warrior to advance to the finals of the mini tournament. Los Guerreros del Infierno leader Último Guerrero had a hard time getting along with Rey Escorpión, playing off long time tension between the two, stemming back several months when Rey Escorpión was kicked out of the Los Guerreros del Infierno group. Despite not displaying any level of team work Guerrero, Dragón Rojo Jr. and Rey Escorpión won their match and also moved to the finals. In the final match El Bufete del Amor was unable to take advantage of the internal strife of the opposite team, even when Rey Escorpión prevented his own partner from scoring the winning pinfall. Dragón Rojo Jr. took advantage of the confusion Guerrero and Rey Escorpión caused, which allowed him to pin Marco Corleone. Following the match Rey Escorpión and Dragón Rojo Jr. celebrated the victory together and challenged the Trios champions to put their title on the line against them, while Guerrero just left the arena without saying a single word.

=== Main Event ===
The main event of the show was the final match of the 2012 Campeon Universal Del CMLL following qualifying rounds on the two previous Super Viernes shows. El Terrible was accompanied by fellow La Fuerza TRT member Rey Bucanero while Hiroshi Tanahashi had CMLL's resident Rudo Japanese wrestler Okumura in his corner for this match. The IWGP World Heavyweight Champion and the CMLL World Heavyweight Champion faced off in a best of three falls match, the only match of the tournament contested under those rules. Despite being a rudo, the Mexican crowd was behind him as he worked with the Japanese Tanahashi, cheering with El Terrible tied the match up, one fall a piece and then pinned NJPW's top guy to become the 2012 Universal Champion. Following the decision El Terrible's rival Rush came to the ring and wanted to attack El Terrible but CMLL officials prevented this from happening. Once Rush was removed from the arena El Terrible was allowed to celebrate his victory and to show off the championship belt that came with the tournament victory.

=== Results ===
No.	Results	Stipulations
1	Apocalipsis and Inquisidor defeated Bengala and Leono	Best two out of three falls tag team match
2	Demus 3:16, Pequeño Nitro and Pequeño Olímpico defeated Astral, Pequeño Halcon and Último Dragóncito - Two falls to One	Best two out of three falls Six-man tag team match
3	Guerrero Maya Jr., Rey Cometa and Stuka Jr. defeated Misterioso Jr., Niebla Roja and Puma King - Two falls to One	Best two out of three falls Six-man tag team match
4	El Felino and Rey Escorpión defeated Maximo and Olímpico	Battle Royal
5	El Bufete del Amor (Marco Corleone, Maximo and Rush ) defeated Black Warrior and Los Invasores (Mr. Águila and Olímpico)	Cuadrangular de Tercias Tournament Semi Final Trios Match
6	Los Guerreros del Infierno (Dragón Rojo Jr., Rey Escorpión and Último Guerrero) defeated La Peste Negra (El Felino and Negro Casas) and Rey Bucanero	Cuadrangular de Tercias Tournament Semi Final Trios Match
7	Los Guerreros del Infierno (Dragón Rojo Jr., Rey Escorpión and Último Guerrero) defeated El Bufete del Amor (Marco Corleone, Maximo and Rush)	Cuadrangular de Tercias Tournament Finals Trios Match
8	El Terrible defeated Hiroshi Tanahashi - Two falls to One	Campeon Universal Del CMLL 2012 Tournament Final Best two-out-of-three falls match
