= Sin Piedad (2008) =

Mexican professional wrestling supercard show

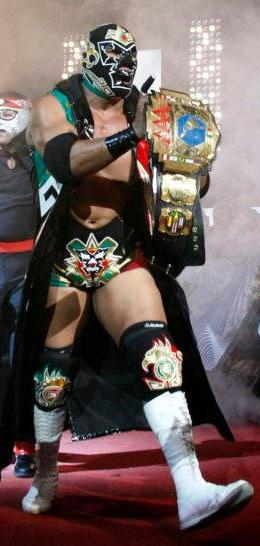
- Dr. Wagner Jr., teamed with Blue Panther and Dos Caras Jr. in the main event match.
- Promotion: Consejo Mundial de Lucha Libre
- Date: August 29, 2008
- City: Mexico City, Mexico
- Venue: Arena México

Pay-per-view chronology
← Previous; International Gran Prix	Next → CMLL 75th Anniversary Show

Sin Piedad chronology
← Previous; 2007	Next → 2010

Sin Piedad (2008) (Spanish for "No Mercy") was a professional wrestling pay-per-view (PPV) produced by Consejo Mundial de Lucha Libre (CMLL), which took place on August 29, 2008 in Arena Mexico, Mexico City, Mexico. The 2008 Sin Piedad was the seventh event under that name that CMLL promoted as their last major show of the year, always held in December. The main event was Six-man "Lucha Libre rules" tag team match between Blue Panther, Dos Caras Jr. and Dr. Wagner Jr. and the team of Black Warrior, Mr. Niebla and Rey Bucanero. The show also featured two Lucha de Apuesta matches, the first one saw La Amapola and Lady Apache put their hair on the line. The second match saw Dragón Rojo Jr. and Mictlán both risk their masks. The show also featured three further six-man "Lucha Libre rules" tag team matches, including one featuring wrestlers from Total Nonstop Action Wrestling (TNA) and another featured CMLL's Mini-Estrellas division.

== Production ==
=== Background ===
The Mexican wrestling company Consejo Mundial de Lucha Libre (Spanish for "World Wrestling Council"; CMLL) has held a number of major shows over the years using the moniker Sin Piedad ("No Pity" or "No Mercy"). CMLL has intermittently held a show billed specifically as Sin Piedad since 2000, primarily using the name for their "end of the year" show in December, although once they held a Sin Piedad show in August as well. CMLL has on occasion used a different name for the end-of-year show but Sin Piedad is the most commonly used name. All Sin Piedad shows have been held in Arena México in Mexico City, Mexico which is CMLL's main venue, its "home". Traditionally CMLL holds their major events on Friday Nights, which means the Sin Piedad shows replace their regularly scheduled Super Viernes show. The 2008 Sin Piedad show was the eight show to use the name, and the only one to be held in August.

=== Storylines ===
The event featured six professional wrestling matches with different wrestlers involved in pre-existing scripted feuds, plots and storylines. Wrestlers were portrayed as either heels (referred to as rudos in Mexico, those that portray the "bad guys") or faces (técnicos in Mexico, the "good guy" characters) as they followed a series of tension-building events, which culminated in a wrestling match or series of matches.

The main event of the 2008 Sin Piedad show was a traditional Lucha Libre best two out of three falls six-man tag team match, the most common match type in CMLL. The main focus of the main event was the storyline feud between the tecnico Dr. Wagner Jr. and the rudo Mr. Niebla who captained a team each. Originally Dr. Wagner Jr. was slated to team up with Dos Caras Jr. and Místico, who had just returned from China, but a week before the Sin Piedad show Místico suffered an injury when he fractured a collar bone. Blue Panther took Místico's spot, despite being in the middle of a storyline feud with Villano V at the time. Mr. Niebla teamed up with Black Warrior and Rey Bucanero, neither of which really had an ongoing storyline with the opposition. Dr. Wagner and Mr. Niebla had clashed in several intense matches throughout August, including a match where Mr. Niebla broke one or two of his fingers but opted to finish the match despite being in pain. The broken fingers did not cause Mr. Niebla to take any time off from the ring and instead was written into the storyline between the two.

The ring persona Mictlán made his CMLL debut in 2006, based on the myths of the Aztec Underworld. Over the years he worked as a low-card tecnico until mid 2008 when he became involved in a storyline with low-card rudo Dragón Rojo Jr. Rojo had won the 2008 Gran Alternativa tournament while teaming with Último Guerrero. Following his tournament win Dragón Rojo Jr. developed a rivalry with Mictlán, slowly evolving from the two simply being on opposite sides of six-man tag team matches to the two being the focal point of several matches as Dragón Rojo Jr. would often target his rival by tearing his mask apart, or even stripping his opponent of the match to humiliate the tecnico. At times the move would backfire on Dragón Rojo Jr. as the referee would disqualify him and his team for removing the mask, which is an illegal move under lucha libre rules. During a CMLL press conference it was announced that the two wrestlers would both put their masks on the line in the semi-main event of the 2008 Sin Piedad show as they faced off in a Lucha de Apuestas or bet match between the two masked men. The Luchas de Apuestas matches, especially those where the mask is on the line is considered the most prestigious match type in lucha libre and a signal that the winner of the match would more than likely move up the ranks of CMLL.

CMLL held their eleventh International Gran Prix on July 26, 2009 in Arena México which featured wrestlers from CMLL facing off against a team of International wrestlers including some foreigners who were CMLL regulars and six wrestlers from Total Nonstop Action Wrestling (TNA) based in Florida: (A.J. Styles, Alex Shelley, Johnny Devine, Chris Sabin, Jay Lethal and Sonjay Dutt). The match was won by Alex Shelley, lastly eliminating Team CMLL captain Último Guerrero to win the tournament. Following the match Último Guerrero made several challenges towards the TNA contingency, especially Shelley and A.J. Styles. On August 5, 2008 the team of Último Guerrero, Atlantis and Negro Casas (collectively referred to as Los Guerreros Negros, or "The Black Warriors") defeated Los Ángeles Rebeldes (Héctor Garza, El Hijo del Fantasma and La Máscara) to win the CMLL World Trios Championship. It was initially rumored that Los Guerreros would defend the title against a team from TNA, but when the Sin Piedad card was announced the match between Los Guerreros Negro and "Team TNA" (A.J. Styles, Alex Shelley and Chris Sabin) it was a non-title match, but with the possibility of a title match in the future if the CMLL/TNA working relationship continued. In the week before Sin Piedad A.J. Styles was pulled from the match for medical reasons and replaced by Sonjay Dutt instead.

On the undercard four of CMLL's female wrestlers would clash in a match that meant that one of the four wrestlers would either be shaved bald (La Amapola, Lady Apache or Marcela) or be forced to remove their mask (Princesa Sujei) as a result of the match. The match would take place in two stages, first the team of La Amapola and Lady Apache would wrestle against the team of Marcela and Princesa Sujei. The losing team would then be forced to immediately wrestle against each other in a match known as a Relevos suicida match. The match saw long time rivals Lady Apache and La Amapola (CMLL World Women's Champion team up to face Marcela and Princesa Sujei who had a budding rivalry as well. Several sources, including some of the participants themselves were confused by the match and opposed to the format, hoping for a singles Lucha de Apuestas match between two of the participants instead of the more convoluted Relevos suicida match. The issue between Marcela and Princesa Sujei had only been going on for a week or so before the announced match, while Lady Apache and La Amapola had had a long-running rivalry stretching back to November 16, 2007 where La Amapola defeated Lady Apache to win the CMLL World Women's Championship. The issues between the two had focused mainly on the championship and less on a potential Lucha de Apuestas match between the two for their respective hair.

== Results ==
No.	Results	Stipulations
1	Pequeño Damián 666, Pequeño Black Warrior and Pierrothito defeated Fantasy, Mascarita Dorada and Pequeño Olímpico	Best two-out-of-three falls six-man "Lucha Libre rules" tag team match
2	El Hijo del Fantasma, La Máscara and La Sombra defeated El Felino, Heavy Metal and Misterioso Jr.	Best two-out-of-three falls six-man "Lucha Libre rules" tag team match
3	Marcela and Princesa Sujei defeated La Amapola and Lady Apache	Relevos suicida tag team match
4	Lady Apache defeated La Amapola	Lucha de Apuestas, hair vs. hair match
5	Team TNA (Alex Shelley, Chris Sabin and Sonjay Dutt) defeated Los Guerreros Negro (Atlantis, Negro Casas and Último Guerrero)	Best two-out-of-three falls six-man "Lucha Libre rules" tag team match
6	Dragón Rojo Jr. defeated Mictlán	Best two-out-of-three falls Luchas de Apuestas mask vs. mask match
7	Blue Panther, Dos Caras Jr. and Dr. Wagner Jr. defeated Black Warrior, Mr. Niebla and Rey Bucanero	Best two-out-of-three falls six-man "Lucha Libre rules" tag team match
