= Dragón Rojo Jr. =

Mexican professional wrestler (born 1982)

Personal information
- Born: Anselmo Rivas Castro; November 3, 1982 (age 44) Gómez Palacio, Durango, Mexico

Professional wrestling career
- Ring name(s): Diamante Negro; Dragón Rojo Jr. El Susto; Zaracatán Jr.
- Billed height: 1.80 m (5 ft 11 in)
- Billed weight: 85 kg (187 lb)
- Billed from: Gómez Palacio, Durango, Mexico
- Trained by: Raúl Díaz; Dandy Garcia; El Satánico; Último Guerrero
- Debut: June 28, 2001

Anselmo Rivas Castro (born November 3, 1982), best known by his ring name Dragón Rojo Jr. (Spanish for "Red Dragon Jr."), is a Mexican professional wrestler. He is signed to Consejo Mundial de Lucha Libre (CMLL), where he is the leader of the Los Dragones stable.

Dragón Rojo Jr. originally wrestled under the ring names Zaracatán Jr. and Diamante Negro. He formerly led the stable Los Revolucionarios del Terror, previously being a member of Poder Mexica and Los Guerreros de la Atlantida. He is a former two-time CMLL World Middleweight Champion (currently holding the record for most days as Middleweight Champion), NWA World Historic Middleweight Champion, CMLL World Tag Team Champion, CMLL World Trios Champion and Mexican National Trios Champion. He has won several tournaments in CMLL, including the Torneo Gran Alternativa in 2008, the La Copa Junior in 2010, and the Reyes del Aire VIP and CMLL Universal Championship in 2023. He has also wrestled in Japan for New Japan Pro-Wrestling (NJPW).

== Personal life ==
Anselmo Rivas Castro was born on November 3, 1982, in Gómez Palacio, Durango, Mexico. While it was later claimed that he is the grandson of a professional wrestler from the 1970s called Dragón Rojo, it is believed that this is a storyline relationship only used to explain the ring name, something not uncommon in lucha libre. Dragón Rojo Jr. has a college degree in physical education, which he has taught at the primary school of Ejido Luján in Gómez Palacio, Durango, inspired to become a teacher like his father. He is one of Consejo Mundial de Lucha Libre's ("World Wrestling Council; CMLL) "ambassadors" in their campaign against tuberculosis, raising awareness and money for the fight against the disease. He has a wife and daughter.

== Professional wrestling career ==
=== Early career (2001–2007) ===
After training for two years under Raúl Díaz and Dandy Garcia, he made his debut on June 28, 2001, using the name "Zaracatán Jr.", a masked técnico ("good guy") ring persona. He was named the Lagunero area "Rookie of the year" for his work in the local promotion that put on shows in Torreón and Gómez Palacio in Durango. After his rookie year, he suffered an injury that forced him out of wrestling for two years, while recovering and rehabilitating. When he returned to the ring, he changed his ring personas and became a rudo ("bad guy") character called "Diamante Negro Jr."; the "Jr." was soon dropped. He stated that the five sided diamond on his mask stood for "passion, aggressiveness, strength, dedication, and professionalism", and that it was black because he was a rudo. In 2007, Diamante Negro won the mask of two wrestlers, Tackle and Guerrero, defeating each in a Lucha de Apuestas ("bet match").

=== Consejo Mundial de Lucha Libre (2007–present) ===
==== Diamante Negro (2007–2008) ====
In 2007, Diamante Negro was signed by CMLL after being invited to train with them by CMLL mainstay Último Guerrero. He worked mainly on the lower half of the card in trios matches with mixed success. The following year, he was named as a member of "Generación del 75", a group of young wrestlers who exemplified the "CMLL future" in CMLL's 75th anniversary year. The group also included Flash, Mictlán, Tiger Kid, Hijo del Faraón, Axxel, El Hijo del Fantasma, Bronco, Metalik, Puma King, Skándalo, Súper Nova and Vangelis. On May 9, he competed in the Reyes del Aire ("Kings of the Air") tournament, but was the fifth wrestler eliminated from the torneo cibernetico. The following month, Diamante Negro and Bronco were one of sixteen teams entered into a tournament for the revived CMLL Arena Coliseo Tag Team Championship, with the first three rounds commencing on June 22. They defeated Loco Max and Vangelis in the first round and Fabián el Gitano and Mictlán in the quarter-finals, before losing to eventual winners Flash and Stuka Jr. in the semi-finals.

==== Dragón Rojo Jr. and Poder Mexica (2008–2010) ====
Diamante Negro was scheduled to team with Guerrero in the Torneo Gran Alternativa ("Great Alternative Tournament"). However, on July 17, 2008, it was officially announced that he had changed names and would, from then on, work as "Dragón Rojo Jr.", taking the name of his grandfather "Dragón Rojo"; the new gimmick and mask was noted as bearing a striking resemblance to an animated character of the same name on the show Los Campeones de la Lucha Libre ("The Champions of Wrestling"). The next day, he and Guerrero won the tournament, defeating Dos Caras Jr. and Metalik in the finals. At Sin Piedad ("No Mercy") on August 29, Dragón Rojo Jr. defeated rival Mictlán in a Lucha de Apuestas, forcing him to unmask and reveal his real name. On December 9, he outlasted Black Warrior, Felino, Flash, Heavy Metal, La Máscara, Loco Max, Máscara Dorada, Máscara Púrpura, Mictlán, Stuka Jr. and Virus to become the number one contender for Sangre Azteca's Mexican National Welterweight Championship. The following week, the title match ended in a double countout, meaning that Azteca retained the title.

Dragón Rojo Jr., Azteca and Black Warrior then formed the trio Poder Mexica ("Mexican Power"), defeating El Sagrado, La Sombra and Volador Jr. on February 3, 2009, to win the Mexican National Trios Championship. The following month, Misterioso Jr. replaced Black Warrior in several matches in Mexico City and later became an official member of Poder Mexica. At Homenaje a Dos Leyendas ("Homage to Two Legends") on March 20, Poder Mexica lost to CMLL World Trios Champions El Hijo del Fantasma, Héctor Garza and La Máscara. For holding a championship, Dragón Rojo Jr. participated in the inaugural Universal Championship tournament on June 5, losing to Averno in the first round. At the CMLL 76th Anniversary Show on September 18, Poder Mexica lost to Dorada, El Hijo del Fantasma and El Sagrado. On October 30, he unsuccessfully challenged Valiente for the Mexican National Welterweight Championship. On December 19, it was announced by the Comisión de Box y Lucha Libre Mexico D.F. that Poder Mexica had been stripped of their championship since Black Warrior left CMLL, breaking up the team. At the same time, they announced an eight team tournament to crown a new trios champion. Poder Mexica defeated Fabián el Gitano, Máximo and Rouge and then Delta, Leono and Valiente to qualify for the finals, where they lost to Dorada, Metro and Stuka Jr. on January 6, 2010. For that year's Torneo Nacional de Parejas Increíbles ("National Incredible Pairs Tournament"), which forces rivals to team up, Dragón Rojo Jr. was paired with La Sombra; they lost to Atlantis and Dorada in the first round on January 22.

==== Los Guerreros de la Atlantida (2010–2012) ====
On November 2, Dragón Rojo Jr. (replacing an injured Atlantis) and Guerrero defeated Garza and Mr. Águila for the CMLL World Tag Team Championship. After the match, he announced that he was leaving Poder Mexica and joining Los Guerreros de la Atlantida. On December 10, he defeated Maximo, La Máscara, La Sombra and Volador Jr. en route to the finals of the La Copa Junior ("The Junior Cup") tournament on December 25, where he defeated Averno. On February 11, 2011, he and Blue Panther were paired for the Torneo Nacional de Parejas Increíbles, defeating Delta and Garza in the first round, Ángel de Oro and Guerrero in the quarter-finals and Metro and Rey Bucanero in the semi-finals. Two weeks later, they lost to Atlantis and Dorada in the finals. On September 9, he lost to La Máscara in the first round of the Universal Championship tournament. At the CMLL 78th Anniversary Show on September 30, Dragón Rojo Jr. participated in the semi-final of the Leyenda de Plata ("The Silver Legend") tournament, where he eliminated Olímpico, before being the second to last wrestler eliminated by Mephisto.

On November 18, Dragón Rojo Jr. defeated Jushin Thunder Liger to win the CMLL World Middleweight Championship, making him a double champion. Throughout 2012, Dragón Rojo Jr. successfully defended his title against Ángel de Oro on January 3, La Sombra on April 30 and May 20, and Titán on July 20. On August 3, he and Guerrero lost the CMLL World Tag Team Championship to Atlantis and Diamante Azul, ending their reign at 640 days. He was again defeated by La Máscara in the first round of the Universal Championship tournament on August 24. On September 28, Rojo Jr. defeated Prince Devitt to win the NWA World Historic Middleweight Championship, making him a double middleweight champion.

==== Los Revolucionarios del Terror (2012–2021) ====
Following his championship victory, Dragón Rojo Jr. quit Los Guerreros del Infierno, forming a team with Rey Escorpión and Pólvora unveiled as Los Revolucionarios del Terror ("The Revolutionaries of Terror"). He was forced to team up with partner-turned-rival Niebla Roja for the Torneo Nacional de Parejas Increibles on March 8, 2013, defeating El Terrible and Rush in the first round and Blue Panther and Escorpión in the quarter-finals, before losing in the semi-finals to Atlantis and Último Guerrero. At the CMLL 80th Anniversary Show on September 13, Los Revolucionarios del Terror failed to win the CMLL World Trios Championship from Dorada, Místico and Valiente. On June 20, he competed in the Leyenda de Azul ("The Blue Legend") tournament, but was eliminated mid-way through.

On July 9, Dragón Rojo Jr. announced that due to his recent problems with his stablemates, he was leaving Los Revolucionarios del Terror and turning técnico. He successfully defended the CMLL World Middleweight Championship against Escorpión on August 8. During the Universal Championship tournament on August 22, he defeated Virus in the first round, but lost to Guerrero in the quarter-finals. He ended 2014 by successfully defending his title against Pólvora on December 22. In early 2015, Dragón Rojo Jr. feuded with Roja over the title, successfully defending it against him on February 3. They were defeated by El Terrible and Máximo in the first round of the Torneo Nacional de Parejas Increíbles on February 27.

Dragón Rojo Jr. returned to the rudo side on May 8, as he, Escorpión and Pólvora revived Los Revolucionarios del Terror. They defeated Guerrero Maya Jr., Máximo and Stuka Jr. at the CMLL 82nd Anniversary Show on September 18. On April 15, 2016, he and Euforia lost to Marco Corleone and Rush in the first round of the Torneo Nacional de Parejas Increíbles. Two months later, he defeated Guerrero Maya Jr. to retain his title. As their feud continued, on February 17, 2017, he and Guerrero Maya Jr. lost to Atlantis and Euforia in that year's Torneo Nacional de Parejas Increíbles. On March 25, Dragón Rojo Jr. lost the CMLL World Middleweight Championship to Ángel de Oro, ending his reign nearly five-and-a-half years after it started. He competed in a torneo cibernetico for the vacant CMLL World Heavyweight Championship on June 6, but was the first wrestler eliminated by Pierroth. On September 16, he, Hechicero and Pólvora defeated Blue Panther Jr., Stuka Jr. and The Panther at the CMLL 83rd Anniversary Show. Dragón Rojo Jr. did not wrestle after January 22, 2019, having suffered a knee injury that left him unable to perform in the ring. In September 2020, he revealed that he had gone through four knee operations to address the problems, but was uncertain if he would ever be able to return to the ring.

==== Feud with Templario and unmasking (2021–2023) ====
CMLL revealed on February 24, 2021, that Dragón Rojo Jr. would return from injury for the La Copa Junior VIP ("The Junior VIP Cup") tournament on March 26, where he was the second to last wrestler eliminated by Místico, who ripped off his mask and got disqualified. For that year's Torneo Nacional de Parejas Increíbles on June 11, he was paired with Titán, defeating Cancerbero and Espíritu Negro in the first round and Gran Guerrero and Místico in the quarter-finals, before losing to Templario and Volador Jr. in the semi-finals. On July 16, he lost to Templario in the first round of the Leyenda de Plata. At the CMLL 88th Anniversary Show on September 24, Dragón Rojo Jr. lost to Templario in a match for the vacant Mexican National Middleweight Championship. On November 26, he competed in the Leyenda de Azul, eliminating Gemelo Diablo I before being eliminated by Atlantis Jr. Dragón Rojo Jr. won his second CMLL Middleweight Championship by defeating Soberano Jr. on April 4, 2022. He made his first successful title defense on August 12 against Robbie Eagles. At the CMLL 89th Anniversary Show on September 16, he and Soberano Jr. were involved in the Cuadrangular Eliminatorio de Parejas Increíbles ("Incredible Pairs Elimination Quadrangular"), where the winners advanced to the main event in a Lucha de Apuestas; Atlantis Jr. and Stuka Jr. defeated them to advance.

On January 12, 2023, Dragón Rojo Jr. last eliminated Templario to win the Reyes del Aire VIP. He and Titán were again paired for the Torneo Nacional de Parejas Increíbles on February 10, defeating Kraneo and Volcano in the first round before losing to Soberano Jr. and Templario in the semi-finals. At Homenaje a Dos Leyendas on March 17, he, Templario and Niebla Roja lost to Atlantis, Atlantis Jr. and Místico, after which Dragón Rojo Jr. tore Templario's mask. On April 21, he outlasted Ángel de Oro, Bárbaro Cavernario, Euforia, Gran Guerrero, Hechicero, Mephisto, Niebla Roja, Stigma and Titán to advance to the finals of the Universal Championship tournament, which he won the following week by defeating Atlantis Jr. and Templario. On May 12, he lost the CMLL Middleweight Championship to Templario after interference from Chamuel. The following week, Dragón Rojo Jr. and Soberano Jr. defeated Atlantis Jr., Averno, El Hijo del Villano III, Místico, Panterita del Ring Jr. and Volador Jr. in the semi-finals of that year's La Copa Junior VIP. He lost to Soberano Jr. in the finals on May 26. On September 16, at the CMLL 90th Anniversary Show, Dragón Rojo Jr. lost to Templario in a mask vs. mask Lucha de Apuestas to end their feud. As a result, Dragón Rojo Jr. had to unmask and reveal his birth name.

==== Post-unmasking (2023–present) ====
Not long after unmasking, Dragón Rojo Jr. began teaming with Bárbaro Cavernario and El Terrible as Los Barbaros ("The Barbarians"). On February 5, 2024, they defeated Atlantis Jr., Star Jr. and Volador Jr. to win the CMLL World Trios Championship. Dragón Rojo Jr. was paired with Templario for that year's Torneo Nacional de Parejas Increíbles on March 22, losing to Hechicero and Stuka Jr. in the first round. On July 16, Los Barbaros lost the title to Máscara Dorada, Neón and Star Jr. On October 6, Cavernario and El Terrible turned on Dragón Rojo Jr. by attacking him to the point where he had to be stretchered out of the arena, kicking him out of Los Barbaros and turning Dragón Rojo Jr. técnico once more. On November 8, he participated in a torneo cibernetico to determine the number one contender for the NWA World Historic Middleweight Championship, scoring the first elimination over Guerrero Maya Jr., before being eliminated himself by Flip Gordon. He also competed in the Reyes del Aire on February 4, 2025, but was eliminated by Titán. He subsequently failed to win the title from Gordon on February 22, as well as the Mexican National Middleweight Championship from Guerrero Maya Jr. on March 3.

In May, Dragón Rojo Jr. formed a stable with Dragon de Fuego and Dragon Legendario known as Los Dragones ("The Dragons"). On July 11, they unsuccessfully challenged El Cobarde, Felino Jr. and Hijo de Stuka Jr. for the Mexican National Trios Championship. At the CMLL 92nd Anniversary Show on September 19, Dragón Rojo Jr. and Cavernario were the first team eliminated in a three-way elimination tag team match where the winners advanced to a Lucha de Apuestas in the main event.

=== New Japan Pro-Wrestling (2011, 2013) ===
On January 22, 2011, Dragón Rojo Jr. made his Japanese debut, taking part in the Fantastica Mania 2011 weekend, co-promoted by CMLL and New Japan Pro-Wrestling (NJPW) in Tokyo. During the first night, he teamed with Tomohiro Ishii to defeat La Máscara and Tiger Mask. The following night, he, Atlantis and Taichi were defeated by Giant Bernard, Jushin Thunder Liger and Karl Anderson. In January 2013, Dragón Rojo Jr. took part in the three-day Fantastica Mania 2013 event. During the first night on January 18, he was defeated by Prince Devitt in a non-title match. The following night, Rojo Jr., Ishii and Yoshi-Hashi defeated Bushi, Devitt and Ryusuke Taguchi. During the third and final night, Dragón Rojo Jr. lost the NWA World Historic Middleweight Championship to La Sombra.

== Championships and accomplishments ==
- Consejo Mundial de Lucha Libre
  - NWA World Historic Middleweight Championship (1 time)
  - CMLL World Middleweight Championship (2 times)
  - CMLL World Tag Team Championship (1 time) – with Último Guerrero
  - CMLL World Trios Championship (1 time) – with Bárbaro Cavernario and El Terrible
  - Mexican National Trios Championship (1 time) – with Sangre Azteca and Black Warrior
  - CMLL Universal Championship (2023)
  - La Copa Junior (2010)
  - Torneo Gran Alternativa (2008) – with Último Guerrero
  - Reyes del Aire (2023 VIP)
  - CMLL "Revelation" of the year: 2009
- Desastre Total Ultraviolento/DTU Lucha Profesional Mexicana
  - DTU Tag Team Championship (1 time) – with Pólvora
- Pro Wrestling Illustrated
  - PWI ranked him #138 of the top 500 singles wrestlers in the PWI 500 in 2014

== Luchas de Apuestas record ==
Winner (wager)	Loser (wager)	Location	Event	Date	Notes
Diamante Negro (mask)	Tackle (hair)	Gómez Palacio, Durango	Live event	September 23, 2007	
Diamante Negro (mask)	Guerrero (hair)	Gómez Palacio, Durango	Live event	2007	
Dragón Rojo Jr. (mask)	Mictlán (mask)	Mexico City	Sin Piedad	August 29, 2008	
Templario (mask)	Dragón Rojo Jr. (mask)	Mexico City	CMLL 90th Anniversary Show	September 16, 2023	
