= Loco Max =

Mexican professional wrestler

Personal information
- Born: Edgar Gabriel Morales Correa; March 10, 1972 (age 54) Mexico City, Mexico

Professional wrestling career
- Ring name: Loco Max
- Billed height: 1.70 m (5 ft 7 in)
- Billed weight: 75 kg (165 lb)
- Trained by: Demonio Blanco; Pantera; Manuel Melèndez Phorto; Guillermo Heras; Juan Manuel Robles; Benjamìn Mar; Shocker; El Satánico; Franco Colombo
- Debut: May 3, 1993

Edgar Gabriel Morales Correa, better known under the ring name Loco Max (born March 10, 1972, in Mexico City, Mexico) is a Mexican professional wrestler currently on the Mexican professional wrestling independent circuit portraying a rudo ("Bad guy") wrestling character. As Loco Max Morales worked for Consejo Mundial de Lucha Libre (CMLL) for many years where he was a part of groups known as Pandilla Guerrera and Los Guerreros Tuareg and also held the Mexican National Lightweight Championship.

== Professional wrestling career ==
Morales made his in-ring debut on May 3, 1993, under the ring name "Loco Max" ("Crazy Max"/"Mad Max") and worked on the Mexican independent circuit for a number of years. in the late 1990s Loco Max began working for CMLL, primarily on their Guadalajara, Jalisco shows. During the time he developed a storyline feud with Ricky Marvin, with the two fighting over the Mexican National Lightweight Championship, held by Marvin at the time. On March 12, 2001, Loco Max won his first wrestling championship as he pinned Ricky Marvin to win the championship. The quality of the matches and more importantly the fans reaction to the matches earned both Loco Max and Marvin a chance to work in Mexico City, CMLL's main venue.

=== Guapos U (2002-2003) ===
In 2002 CMLL created the Guapos University ("Hansome University"), or Guapos U, a storyline mimicking realities shows such as the WWE Tough Enough show, searching for a new member to join Shocker and Máscara Mágica as part of a group known as Los Guapos. The contestants included Loco Max, El Terrible, Mr. Power, Genetico, Tony Rivera, Zumbido, Ricky Marvin, Loco Max, Alex Steel, Marshall and Caballero with all of them going through various in and out of ring challenges to prove "worthy" of joining Los Guapos. The show spanned many shows and Loco Max was eliminated from the group about midway through. In the end El Terrible won the contest and became a member of Los Guapos. In late 2003 Loco Max teamed up with Nitro and Violencia to participate in a tournament for the vacant Mexican National Trios Championship, but the trio was eliminated in the first round by the team of Averno, Mephisto and El Satánico. Around this time Loco Max began developing an in-ring character that was actually "Loco", having lost all touch with reality Loco Max would start to talk and interact with stuffed animals, thinking they were his friends. In late 2003 CMLL held another Guapos U contest but when Loco Max tried out for the show Los Guapos turned him down since crazy was not Guapo.

=== Pandilla Guerrera/Guerreros Tuareg (2004-2012) ===
The second Guapos U contest lead to tournament participants Sangre Azteca and El Koreano defecting from the group to create their own group known as Pandilla Guerrera ("Gang of Warriors") associated with CMLL's main rudo faction Los Guerreros del Infierno. Loco Max along with Ramstein, Dr. X, Nitro, Hooligan and Arkangel de la Muerte all joined the group. At some point around the creation of Pandilla Guerrera the Mexico City wrestling and boxing commission stripped Loco Max of the Mexican National Lightweight Championship, presumably for lack of championship defenses since 2003. On July 29, 2005, Loco Max participated in the first ever CMLL G1 Junior Climax tournament but was eliminated in the semi-finals by La Máscara. On February 6, 2006, Loco Max teamed up with Rey Bucanero for the 2006 Gran Alternativa ("Great Alternative") tournament, a tag team tournament where a relative rookie was teamed up with a veteran for a one night tournament. The duo defeated Heavy Metal and El Texano, Jr. in the first round, but lost to Último Guerrero and Nitro in the second round of the night. A few months later Loco Max was one of 10 wrestlers competing in the 2006 Reyes del Aire ("Kings of the Air") tournament with Loco Max being the third man eliminated.

In mid-2007 Pandila Guerrera broke away from Los Guerreros del Infierno to create their own separate identity in order to gain more success in CMLL. The group added Skándalo to its roster while Sangre Azteca decided to join Los Guerreros instead, Nitro took over as the leader of the group. The group was repackaged as Los Guerreros Tuareg ("The Tuareg Warriors"), inspired by the Tuareg Nomadic tribe, which was reflected in the robes and headgear the team wore to the ring and a more African tribal type entrance music. When Guerrero complained that the Guerreros Tuareg name was too close to his team they were renamed Los Rebeldes del Desierto ("The Rebels of the Desert") and also referred to as Los Rebeldes Tuareg, but the angle with Guerrero was quietly abandoned and the group reverted to the Guerreros Tuareg moniker. In December 2009 Loco Max teamed up with Arkangel de la Muerte and Skándalo to represent Los Guerreros Tuareg in a tournament for the vacant Mexican National Trios Championship, but the Tuareg group was eliminated by eventual tournament winners Máscara Dorada, Metro and Stuka, Jr.

=== Mexican Independent Circuit (2012-present) ===
In mid-2012 Morales announced that he had left CMLL, thanking them for the many years he worked there and announced that he would be looking for opportunities outside of CMLL, travelling on the Mexican Independent circuit. One opportunity came in the International Wrestling League (IWL) where Loco Max started making regular appearances after leaving CMLL. He became part of IWL's main Rudo group Los Mazisos along with Arana de Plata, Ciclope, Crazy King, Eterno, Humo, La Mazisa, Miedo Xtremo, Pequeno Cobra and Terremoto Negro. On June 18, 2013, Loco Max teamed up with Zumbido and Tony Rivera to win IWL's Copa Criterio Extrema tournament, defeating Carta Brava, Jr., Cerebro Negro and Fantasma de la Opera in the finals. He also became a regular worker for the promotions in the Xalapa, Veracruz area, working extended storylines with local tecnicos losing his hair to both As del Espacio in 2013 and Corsario de Fuego in 2014

== Championships and accomplishments ==
- Consejo Mundial de Lucha Libre
  - Mexican National Lightweight Championship (1 time) (Note: The Mexican National Lightweight Championship is sanctioned by the Mexico City wrestling commission but under the control of CMLL who make the day to day decisions.)
- International Wrestling League
  - Copa Criterio Extrema (2013)

== Lucha de Apuesta record ==
Winner (wager)	Loser (wager)	Location	Event	Date	Notes
Asturiano (hair)	Loco Max (hair)	Puebla, Puebla	Live event	July 16, 2001	
Alan Stone and Zumbido (hair)	Loco Max and Mr. México (hair)	Mexico City	Live event	November 19, 2004	
Máximo (hair)	Loco Max (hair)	Mexico City	Live event	June 5, 2006	
Leono (hair)	Loco Max (hair)	Puebla, Puebla	Live event	June 4, 2007	
Loco Max (hair)	Tony Rivera (hair)	Mexico City	Live event	October 5, 2008	
Mictlán (hair)	Loco Max (hair)	Mexico City	Live event	December 2, 2008	
Loco Max (hair)	Centella de Oro (hair)	Puebla, Puebla	Live event	July 19, 2010	
Rush (hair)	Loco Max (hair)	Mexico City	Live event	August 15, 2010	
Loco Max (hair)	Escorpión (hair)	Puebla, Puebla	Live event	March 14, 2011	
Palacio Negro (mask)	Loco Max (hair)	Guadalajara, Jalisco	Live event	September 30, 2011	(Note: Last two men in a 14-man Steel cage match that also included Metal Blanco, Toscano, Guerrero Maya, Jr., Ángel de Plata, Delta, Okumura, Leono, Yoshihashi, Leo, Maléfico, El Sagrado and Pólvora)
Virus (hair)	Loco Max (hair)	Puebla, Puebla	Live event	March 12, 2012	
As del Espacio (hair)	Loco Max (hair)	Xalapa, Veracruz	Live event	April 27, 2013	
Corsario de Fuego (hair)	Loco Max (hair)	Xalapa, Veracruz	Live event	July 13, 2014	(Note: Seven way match that also included Crazy Man, El Hijo del Fantasma, Máscara Año 2000, Jr., Poseidon and Rey Infierno.)
