= Mictlán (wrestler) =

Mexican professional wrestler

Personal information
- Born: Jonathan de Jesus Navarro Jímenez; August 25, 1982 (age 43) Guadalajara, Jalisco, Mexico
- Website: Mictlán at Hi5

Professional wrestling career
- Ring name(s): Angel del Barrio; Randy; Vaquero I Mictlán
- Billed height: 1.76 m (5 ft 9 in)
- Billed weight: 83 kg (183 lb)
- Trained by: Vaquero; El Texano; Franco Colombo
- Debut: August 22, 1999

Jonathan de Jesus Navarro Jímenez (born August 25, 1982) is a Mexican professional wrestler. He currently working for Consejo Mundial de Lucha Libre (CMLL) using the ring name Mictlán. Mictlán was originally an masked wrestler but lost his mask to Dragón Rojo, Jr., on August 8, 2008. On August 18, 2009 Navarro won his first wrestling championship, defeating Misterioso, Jr. to win the Occidente Light Heavyweight Championship.

== Professional wrestling career ==
Growing up Navarro watched his older brother wrestle as El Dandy and followed in his footsteps at the age of 17. Navarro made his debut under the ring name Ángel del Barrio (Spanish for "Angel of the Neighborhood"). Navarro worked for just over two years as Ángel del Barrio before losing his mask to Hator as a result of a Luchas de Apuestas, or bet match. A month later Navarro had his hair shaved off after losing another Luchas de Apuesta to Hator. Following the mask and hair loss Navarro began working as "Randy" and later on as "Vaquero I" (Spanish for "Cowboy I").

In 2006 Navarro began working regularly on the main Consejo Mundial de Lucha Libre (CMLL) shows, adopting a new ring persona; A masked personal called Mictlán, based on the myhtis of the Aztec Underworld. Over the next two years Mictlán worked in the first or second matches on the show without direction until he started a storyline feud with Dragón Rojo, Jr. The storyline between the two build to a Luchas de Apuesta between the two masked men. On August 8, 2009 Mictlán lost to Dragón Rojo, Jr. and was unmasked. Following the mask loss CMLL has promoted Mictlán a bit higher in the rankings, giving him more of a metrosexual, stripper ring persona. Following his unmasking Mictlán won the hair of Loco Max on December 12, 2008 in a Luchas de Apuestas match. On August 18, 2009 Mictlán defeated Misterioso, Jr. to win the Occidente (Western) Light Heavyweight Championship, overcoming both his opponent and interference from Máscara Mágica, Misterioso, Jr's cornerman. After the match Mictlán revealed that he was wrestling with an injured elbow but did not let that stop him from competing. He also made a Luchas de Apuestas challenge for a "hair vs. hair" match with Máscara Mágica. In the weeks after Mictlán's title victory Máscara Mágica repeatedly attacked Mictlán before matches, claiming that he "did not want to see Mictlán dance". Máscara Mágica pinned Mictlán in several tag and six-man matches leading up to their Lucha de Apuesta on September 17, 2009 at Arena Coliseo in Guadalajara. Mictlán won the first fall after Máscara Magica was disqualified for excessive violence. Mágica won the second fall but Mictlán picked up the third fall to win the match. Afterwards Máscara Mágica took the clippers from the official and shaved his own hair off.

== Personal life ==
Navarro is the younger brother of professional wrestler El Dandy and the nephew of El Texano. He is also the cousin of wrestlers El Texano, Jr. and Súper Nova (III).

== Championships and accomplishments ==
- Consejo Mundial de Lucha Libre
  - CMLL Bodybuilding Contest (2006 - Intermediate)
- CMLL Guadalajara

- Occidente Light Heavyweight Championship (1 time)

== Luchas de Apuestas record ==
Winner (wager)	Loser (wager)	Location	Event	Date	Notes
Hator (mask)	Ángel de Barrio (mask)	Monterrey, Nuevo León	Live event	July 14, 2002	
Hator (mask)	Ángel de Barrio (hair)	Monterrey, Nuevo León	Live event	August 4, 2002	
Stuka (mask)	Vaquero I (mask)	Monterrey, Nuevo León	Live event	2003	
Loco Zandokan II (hair)	Vaquero I (hair)	Guadalajara, Jalisco	Live event	July 16, 2006	
Dragón Rojo, Jr. (mask)	Mictlán (mask)	Mexico City	CMLL show	August 9, 2008	
Mictlán (hair)	Loco Max (hair)	Mexico City	CMLL show	December 2, 2008	
Mictlán (hair)	Máscara Mágica (hair)	Guadalajara, Jalisco	CMLL show	September 17, 2009	
