= CMLL Super Viernes (April 2010) =

Mexican Professional wrestling show summary

In April 2010 Mexican professional wrestling promotion Consejo Mundial de Lucha Libre (CMLL) held a total of five CMLL Super Viernes shows, all of which took place Arena México on Friday nights. CMLL did not hold any special events on Fridays that would force a cancellation such as a pay-per-view (PPV). Some of the matches from Super Viernes were taped for CMLL's weekly shows that air in Mexico and the United States in the weeks following the Super Viernes show. Super Viernes often features storyline feud between two wrestlers or group of wrestlers that develop from week to week, often coming to a conclusion at a major CMLL event or in a match on Friday nights between the individuals. In total Super Viernes featured 46 matches with 82 wrestlers appearing in matches during April. This included six women and seven Mini-Estrellas. CMLL only held one match featuring the women's division, two featuring the Mini-Etrellas and five Lightning matches. Místico was only wrestler to appear on all five Super Vierens shows in April.

After being a rúdo since late January, 2010 April saw a change of heart by Místico. After losing a match he simply announced that he was tired of being a rúdo and was returning to the técnico (good guy) side from now on. During his appearance as a técnico Místico used rúdo tactics to win the match which cast doubts on where his allegiance truly lay. In subsequent weeks Místico appeared working more and more as a técnico again, although his feud with Volador Jr. flared up again during that period of time, just not on Super Viernes. After building the feud since later January, 2010 the storyline between Mini-Estrellas Bracito de Oro and Pequeño Black Warrior reached its crescendo on April 30, 2010 where Pequeño Black Warrior defeated Bracito de Oro, two falls to one, in a Lucha de Apuestas, mask vs. mask match, forcing Bracito de Oro to unmask after the match.

In another development Héctor Garza appeared to be turning on his team mates El Hijo del Fantasma and La Máscara (who jointly held the CMLL World Trios Championship). During one show he walked out on his partners after a misunderstanding, later on he teamed up with a rúdo for the Gran Alternativa. His actions were followed by insincere claims of still being a técnico. April also saw host to the 2010 Torneo Gran Alternativa ("Great Alternative tournament"). Unlike previous tournaments this year's Gran Alternativa was split out over three days and featured 16 teams instead of the usual 8 teams. On April 16, 2010 the team of Héctor Garza and Pólvora defeated Diamante and La Sombra to qualify for the final match. On April 23, Delta and Volador Jr. defeated Puma King and Último Guerrero to become the second team to qualify for the finals. On April 30, 2010 Pólvora and Héctor Garza won the 2010 Gran Alternativa.

== April 2, 2010 ==
CMLL Super Viernes
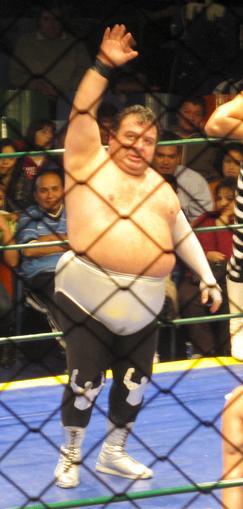
- Brazo de Plata, won in the main event
- Promotion: Consejo Mundial de Lucha Libre (CMLL)
- Date: April 2, 2010
- City: Mexico City, Mexico
- Venue: Arena México

CMLL Super Viernes chronology
← Previous; Super Viernes March 26, 2010	Next → Super Viernes April 9, 2010

The Main event of the April 2, 2010 Super Viernes featured the four men who main evented the 2010 Homejane a Dos Leyendas face off once more as La Sombra and Volador Jr. teamed up with Brazo de Plata to take on Místico, El Felino and Negro Casas. The técnico team (good guy) of Sombra, Volador Jr. and Brazo de Plata came out first, with the 135 kg (298 lb) Brazo de Plata wearing a "Super Sky Team" mask (Sombra and Volador Jr. at times wrestle as "Super Sky Team"), both as a show of unity and as a swipe at Místico who used to be part of the Super Sky Team. While the técnico team showed unity the Rúdo team did not, with La Peste Negra (Casas and Felino) leaving Místico alone in the ring for the final fall as he was defeated by Volador Jr. Following the match Místico took a microphone and announced that he would not have lost if Peste Negra had not left him alone in the ring. He then claimed that he was tired of being a rudo and from now on was "100% técnico", stating that his feud with Volador Jr. was officially over. After this announcement Volador Jr. stated that the feud was not over, that he did not trust Místico and that he could not just "announce he was a tecnico". Following the match the crowd booed Místico as he was alone in the ring without any allies to support him.

In the semi-main event the CMLL World Trios Champions Héctor Garza, El Hijo del Fantasma and La Máscara faced Los Hijos del Averno (El Texano Jr. and El Terrible) and Taichi in a non-title match. The previous week Los Hijos del Averno and Taichi had been able to defeat Garza, Panther and Brazo de Plata due to miscommunication between Garza and Plata but this week Garza got along with his team mates and won the match two falls to one. The fourth match of the night saw Los Hijos del Averno (Averno, Ephesto and Mephisto) defeat the team of Blue Panther, Rush and El Sagrado in three falls. Blue Panther almost won the final fall as he had Mephisto in a pinning predicament but Averno threw a glass of beer in Panther's face, allowing his team mate to pick up the deciding fall.

The lighting match of the evening saw one half of the CMLL Arena Coliseo Tag Team Champions Fuego, who held the tag team title along with Stuka Jr., take on and defeat Pólvora, representing Los Cancerberos del Infierno, a group that had been making requests for a tag team title match. The storyline between Bracito de Oro and Pequeño Black Warrior that was part of the second match of the evening was overshadowed by the appearance of Mascarita Dorada as he teamed with Bracito de Oro and Eléctrico to wrestled Pequeño Nitro, Pequeño Warrior and Pierrothito. In the weeks preceding the show Mascarita Dorada had been fired by CMLL for wrestling on an El Hijo del Santo show. When the match was announced it was speculated that it may have been a new wrestler under the Mascarita Dorada mask, but his performance on the night as he won the match for his team matched indicated that it was indeed the real Mascarita Sagrada. In the opening tag team match rookies Horus and Metálico defeated Disturbio and Durango Kid.

No.	Results	Stipulations
1	Horus and Metálico defeated Disturbio and Durango Kid	tag team match
2	Bracito de Oro, Eléctrico and Mascarita Dorada defeated Pequeño Nitro, Pequeño Black Warrior and Pierrothito	Best two out of three falls Six-man tag team match
3	Fuego defeated Pólvora	Lightning match (One fall, 10 minute time-limit match)
4	Los Hijos del Averno (Averno, Ephesto and Mephisto) defeated Blue Panther, Rush and El Sagrado	Best two out of three falls Six-man tag team match
5	Héctor Garza, El Hijo del Fantasma and La Máscara defeated Los Hijos del Averno (El Texano Jr. and El Terrible) and Taichi – two falls to one	Best two out of three falls Six-man tag team match
6	Brazo de Plata, La Sombra and Volador Jr. defeated Místico and La Peste Negra (Negro Casas and El Felino) – two falls to one	Best two out of three falls Six-man tag team match

== April 9, 2010 ==
CMLL Super Viernes
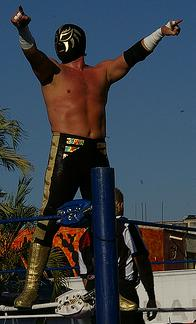
- La Sombra, teamed with Místico and Máscara Dorada
- Promotion: Consejo Mundial de Lucha Libre (CMLL)
- Date: April 9, 2010
- City: Mexico City, Mexico
- Venue: Arena México

CMLL Super Viernes chronology
← Previous; Super Viernes April 2, 2010	Next → Super Viernes April 16, 2010

The focal point of the April 9, 2010 edition of CMLL Super Viernes was Místico's first match after announcing that he was returning to the técnico (good guy) side after working as a rudo (Bad guy) for a couple of months. In the main Místico, who had just announced he was a técnico and not yet shown it at this point, teamed up with Máscara Dorada and a man he had been wrestling against many times over the previous two months, La Sombra. The trio took on Místico's former partners La Peste Negra ("The Black Plague"; Negro Casas and El Felino) who teamed up with Dragón Rojo Jr. for the event. While the fans were solidly behind Místico, chanting his name throughout the match La Sombra did not show the same belief that Místico had actually reformed. Throughout the match La Sombra refused to tag in or out with Místico, having Mascara Dorada serve as an intermediary between the two as he had no problems teaming with Místico. The first fall saw Místico pin El Felino while La Sombra forced Dragón Rojo Jr. to submit. The rúdo team won the second fall when Negro Casas forced Místico to submit. In the third and final fall Místico resorted to his cheating, rudo tactics when he intentionally pulled his own mask off and threw it to El Felino, making the referee think that El Felino had unmasked him. This led to the wrongful disqualification of El Felino and his team in the third fall, so while Místico professed to being a técnico he won like a rúdo. Following the match both La Sombra and Mascara Dorada left the ring while Místico made a Lucha de Apuesta, or bet match, challenge to Felino although Felino did not seem interested in putting his hair on the line against Místico's mask.

The rúdo/técnico orientation of one of the participants of the semi-main event was also a topic of interest since Héctor Garza in previous weeks had at times failed to get along with his teammates, although the previous week's match had gone off without a hitch. The CMLL World Trios Champions, Garza, El Hijo del Fantasma and La Máscara faced off against Los Renegados (El Texano Jr., El Terrible and Vangelis) in a non-title match. During the first fall of the match Vangelis takes advantage of a temporary distraction and hits Garza from behind before quickly exiting the ring, when Garza turns around he sees Hijo del Fantasma behind him and pushes him, thinking it was Hijo del Fantasma that had hit him. While the two argue Los Renegados take advantage of the situation and pins La Máscara to win the first fall. During the second fall Hijo del Fantasma gains control of the match, then motions to tag in Garza only to deny the tag and instead tag in La Máscara. Before entering the ring La Máscara removes his team shirt and throws it at Garza in an act of defiance. While La Máscara wrestles Garza kicks the shirt out of the ring. Late in the match La Méscara holds Vangelis so that Garza can double team him, but while La Comandante, Los Renegados corner woman, distracts Garza Vangelis fights out of the hold so that a distracted Garza ends up kicking La Máscara instead. In the end Los Renegados wins the second fall as well against the Trios champions. Following the match Garza walks out on his team without an explanation.

The fourth match of the evening saw Los Hijos del Averno (Averno, Ephesto and Mephisto) face off against Blue Panther like they did on the previous week's show. Panther teamed up with Stuka Jr. and Toscano but the end result was no different from the previous week when Averno threw a glass of beer in Blue Panther's face allowing Los Hijos to cheat their way to a victory once again. After the match Lucha de Apuesta challenges were made between Averno and Blue Panther, although no definitive match was agreed upon. The Lighting match was a rematch of sorts between Sangre Azteca and Valiente from August 16, 2009 where Vaiente defeated Sangre Azteca to win the Mexican National Welterweight Championship. On the night Valiente proved that his title win was not a fluke when he pinned Sangre Azteca after 7 minutes and 21 seconds.

On the undercard Los Cancerberos del Infierno, represented by Euforia and Pólvora teamed up with Nosferatu to face Los Ángeles Celestiales (Ángel Azteca Jr., Ángel de Oro and Ángel de Plata) in another chapter of the storyline between the two factions. On the night Los Cancerberos were successful, winning two falls to one over Los Ángeles. After the match Ángel de Plata was carried from the ring on a stretcher as he was hurt during a dive out of the ring. In the opening match featured an inconsistent performance by the competitors as the team of Inquisidor and Semental defeated Astro Boy and Trueno in a match that saw several moves either miss the mark or not being executed properly.

No.	Results	Stipulations	Times
1	Inquisidor and Semental defeated Astro Boy and Trueno	tag team match	14:00
2	Los Cancerberos del Infierno (Euforia and Pólvora) and Nosferatu defeated Los Ángeles Celestiales (Ángel Azteca Jr., Ángel de Oro and Ángel de Plata)	Best two out of three falls Six-man tag team match	14:26
3	Valiente defeated Sangre Azteca	Lightning match (One fall, 10 minute time-limit match)	07:21
4	Los Hijos del Averno (Averno, Ephesto and Mephisto) defeated Blue Panther, Stuka Jr. and Toscano	Best two out of three falls Six-man tag team match	17:08
5	Los Renegados (El Texano Jr., El Terrible and Vangelis) defeated Héctor Garza, El Hijo del Fantasma and La Máscara	Best two out of three falls Six-man tag team match	13:38
6	La Sombra, Máscara Dorada and Místico defeated La Peste Negra (Negro Casas and El Felino) and Dragón Rojo Jr. – El Felino was disqualified in the final fall.	Best two out of three falls Six-man tag team match	15:14

== April 16, 2010 ==
CMLL Super Viernes
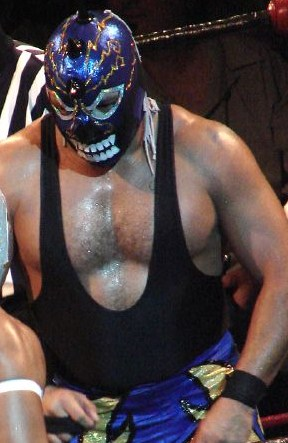
- Mephisto teamed with Cancerbero for one night
- Promotion: Consejo Mundial de Lucha Libre (CMLL)
- Date: April 16, 2010
- City: Mexico City, Mexico
- Venue: Arena México

CMLL Super Viernes chronology
← Previous; Super Viernes April 16, 2010	Next → Super Viernes April 23, 2010

The focal point of the April 16, 2010 Super Viernes show was "Block A" of the 2010 torneo Gran Alternativa ("Great Alternative tournament") where a rookie, or Novato teamed up with a veteran for a tag team tournament. The tournament featured seven matches with the winning team moving on to the finals of the tournament set for the April 30 show.

The main event was a Two out of three falls match between Místico and El Felino. A match that came about as a result of El Felino and Negro Casas abandoning their partner Místico during the main event of the previous week's Super Viernes, with Místico announcing he was not a técnico (good guy) after the match. The match started on the runway that leads to the ring as Felino attacked Místico before he could enter the ring. After fighting on the outside for a minute or so the two entered the ring where El Felino ended up winning the first fall after just 2:45. During the second fall Místico gained control of the match but did the fans were mixed in their support of Místico, with about half the arena cheering for El Felino, siding with the veteran rúdo who has been receiving a lot of fan support since being unmasked the previous month. Místico won the second fall after applying a Michinoku Driver to Felino 5 minutes and 19 seconds into the second fall. El Felino regained dominance in the third fall, a long fall at over nine minutes that ended with El Felino pinning Místico to win the match. Following the match fans threw money into the ring, a traditional way for Mexican lucha libre fans to show their appreciation of a match or in this case for El Felino's victory.

The Gran Alternativa started out with the novato Rey Cometa teaming up with Blue Panther to defeat the team of Semental (Novato) and Rey Bucanero. The second match saw Novato Pólvora, from Los Cancerberos del Infierno team up with one third of the CMLL World Trios Champions Héctor Garza who had acted more and more like a rudo in recent shows to defeat Sensei (Novato) and La Máscara, Garza's regular trios partner. The third opening round match featured Diamante (Novato) and La Sombra defeating Cancerbero (billed as a novato despite having been wrestling since the mid-1990s) and Mephisto. And in the fourth and final opening round match featured Inquisidor and Atlantis qualifying for the second round by defeating Disturbio and El Terrible.

The second round of the tournament featured slightly longer matches at 8:29 and 7:21 respectively. In the first match the team of Pólvora and Héctor Garza faced and defeated Rey Cometa and Blue Panther in a match where Héctor Garza began cheating more and more, displaying a more "rough" wrestling style than usual. The second match had tecnico favorites Diamante and La Sombra defeat Inquisidor and Atlantis in a relatively clean match. The finals saw Garza employ various rudo tactics, especially by trying to unmask both Diamante and La Sombra. Initially the teamwork of Diamante and La Sombra kept the match in their favor, but Garza capitalized on Diamante missing a 450 degree Splash off the top rope and pinned him, followed by Pólvora executing a move off the turnbuckles himself to pin La Sombra. Pólvora and Garza qualify for the finals of the Gran Alternativa scheduled for April 30.

On the undercard the storyline feud between Bracito de Oro and Pequeño Black Warrior continued as each captained a team for a Best two out of three falls Six-man tag team match. Warrior, Pierrothito and Pequeño Nitro defeated Bracito, Eléctrico and Shockercito in two straight falls when Warrior failed Bracito de Oro for the second and deciding fall. Following the match Bracito de Oro challenged Pequeño Black Warrior to a Lucha de Apuestas, mask vs. mask match, which Warrior accepted. In the week following the event it was announced that the two would face off in a Lucha de Apuesta on the April 30 Super Viernes show. The opening match featured Los Rayos Tapatío (I and II) appearing on Super Viernes for the first time in 2010, taking on Apocalipsis and Bronco in the opening tag team match that CMLL traditionally books for their Friday shows. The makeshift team of Apocalipsis and Bronco defeated the regular tag team Los Rayos Tapatío.

No.	Results	Stipulations	Times
1	Apocalipsis and Bronco defeated Los Rayos Tapatío (I and II)	Tag team match	14:55
2	Pequeño Nitro, Pequeño Black Warrior and Pierrothito defeated Bracito de Oro, Eléctrico and Shockercito – Two falls to none	Best two out of three falls Six-man tag team match	11:53
3	Rey Cometa and Blue Panther defeated Semental and Rey Bucanero	Tag team match: Block A of the 2010 Gran Alternativa first round	08:15
4	Pólvora and Héctor Garza defeated Sensei and La Máscara	Tag team match: Block A of the 2010 Gran Alternativa first round	08:14
5	Diamante and La Sombra defeated Cancerbero and Mephisto	Tag team match: Block A of the 2010 Gran Alternativa first round	05:07
6	Inquisidor and Atlantis defeated Disturbio and El Terrible	Tag team match: Block A of the 2010 Gran Alternativa first round	04:30
7	Pólvora and Héctor Garza defeated Rey Cometa and Blue Panther	Tag team match: Block A of the 2010 Gran Alternativa second round	08:29
8	Diamante and La Sombra defeated Inquisidor and Atlantis	Tag team match: Block A of the 2010 Gran Alternativa second round	07:21
9	Pólvora and Héctor Garza defeated Diamante and La Sombra	Tag team match: Block A of the 2010 Gran Alternativa final round	10:07
10	El Felino defeated Místico – two falls to one	Two out of three falls match	16:31

== April 23, 2010 ==
CMLL Super Viernes
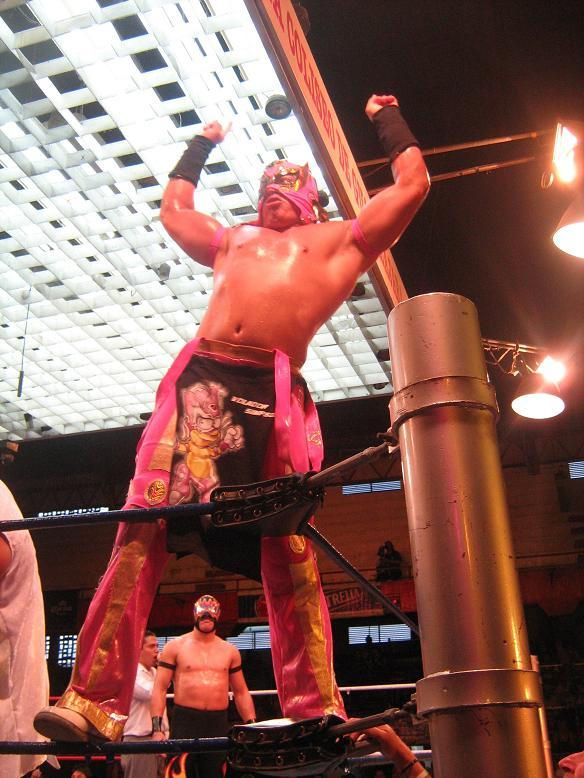
- Volador Jr. along with Delta succeeded in the 2010 Gran Alternativa
- Promotion: Consejo Mundial de Lucha Libre (CMLL)
- Date: April 23, 2010
- City: Mexico City, Mexico
- Venue: Arena México

CMLL Super Viernes chronology
← Previous; Super Viernes April 16, 2010	Next → Super Viernes April 30, 2010

The April 23, 2010 Super Viernes show featured "Block B" of the 2010 Torneo Gran Alternativa ("Great Alternative Tournament") where a rookie, or Novato teams up with a veteran for a tag team tournament, although it did not occupy the main event spot. The main event was a Best two out of three falls Six-man tag team match with Blue Panther, Místico and Jon Strongman against Los Guerreros del Infierno (Atlantis and Rey Bucanero) teaming up with Dragón Rojo Jr. Místico wore a Mexico World Cup futbol Jersey to the ring, underlying his desire for the fans to accept that he indeed was a técnico (good guy) again after playing the rúdo (bad guy) for a couple of months. The técnico team started out dominating the action in the ring, in no small part due to the power of Strong Man. During the match the 309 lb (140 kg) Strong Man climbed up on the second rope and took both Los Guerreros del Inferno down with a shoulder tackle. Following that move Strong Man climbed to the third rope, something he has not done in a match before, and knocked all three rúdos down. Seconds later the técnico team covered all three opponents to win the first fall. Between the first and the second fall Místico and Dragón Rojo Jr. began fighting and ripping at each other's masks. Strong Man continued to give his team the advantage until a high flying drop kick from Atlantis knocked Strong Man out of the ring. The fall ended with Atlantis forcing Blue Panther to submit to a Boston Crab while Dragón Rojo Jr. used the same move to force Místico to submit, evening the score between the two teams. The third and deciding fall only lasted 2:25 before Strong Man pinned Atlantis and Místico forced Rey Bucanero to submit.

The match order of Block B of the 2010 Gran Alternativa was decided by a Battle Royal between the eight Novatos (rookies) in the tournament. The order of elimination dictated who wrestled who. Order of elimination: Pegasso, Puma King, Ángel Azteca Jr., Durango Kid, Tiger Kid and Delta leaving Raziel and Guerrero Maya Jr. as the survivors and opponents for the last match of the first round. In first round of the tournament Puma King and Último Guerrero defeated Pegasso and Toscano. During the match Pegasso performed what was described as the "move of the night" when he leapt off the top rope, executing a 450° splash to Guerrero who was on the floor. During the second match of the Gran Alternativa Ángel Azteca Jr.'s nerves got the best of him during the match as he slipped on the ropes and fell. The fall was instrumental in Durango Kid and El Texano Jr. defeating Ángel Azteca Jr. and Shocker. The third match in the tournament also saw a mistake made during a move, only this time it was the more experienced Volador Jr. that slipped while executing a move off the top rope and landed awkwardly on Tiger Kid's leg by accident. Despite the mistake Volador Jr. and Delta won the match. In the final first round match the rúdo team of Raziel and Averno defeated Guerrero Maya Jr. and Valiente to be the last to qualify for the next round.

In the second round Puma King and Último Guerrero continued their rúdo ways as Guerrero cheated to eliminate both Durango Kid and El Texano Jr. for his side. In the second match Novato Delta pinned the experienced Averno while Volador Jr. pinned Raziel to qualify for the next round. The final match in the Gran Alternativa tournament began during the técnico team's entrance as Guerrero and Puma King jumped them coming down the stairs. The attack almost led to a quick victory except that the referee had not yet made it to the ring. Tiger Kid manages to eliminate Volador Jr. leaving the novato to face both Guerrero and Tiger Kid. Delta manages to pin Tiger Kid and is left facing the CMLL World Heavyweight Champion. Guerrero executes his finishing move but does not get a three count, which displeases him. As Guerrero argues with the referee Delta sneaks up behind him and rolls him up for a pin fall to win the match for his team.

The undercard featured a Lighting Match (One fall, 10 minute time-limit match) between Bracito de Oro and Pequeño Black Warrior. The match was originally scheduled to be a Best two out of three falls Six-man tag team match featuring Mini-Estrella teams captained by Bracito de Oro and Pequeño Black Warrior but was changed to a one-on-one match after it was announced that the two would face off in a Lucha de Apuestas, mask vs. mask match on the April 30, 2010 Super Viernes show. During the match rúdo Pequeño Warrior began tearing at Bracito's mask, hoping to get a preview of the following week's match. At one point the two wrestlers end up on the ramp leading to the ring, during which Bracito de Oro kicks Pequeño Black Warrior down the stairs of the ramp. When Warrior returned to the ring he was favoring his leg, seemingly hurting it in the fall. In the end Bracito de Oro applied a submission move to Pequeño Black Warrior's leg and forced him to submit. In the opening match the team of Mortiz and Inquisidor defeated Molotov and Trueno in just over 10 minutes. This was Mortiz' first appearance on a Super Viernes show.

No.	Results	Stipulations	Times
1	Mortiz and Inquisidor defeated Molotov and Trueno	Tag team match	10:39
2	Bracito de Oro defeated Pequeño Black Warrior	Lightning match (One fall, 10 minute time-limit match)	06:23
3	Raziel and Guerrero Maya Jr. defeated Puma King, Pegasso, Durango Kid, Ángel Azteca Jr., Delta and Tiger Kid	8-Man Battle Royal for the match order of the Gran Alternativa tournament	—
4	Puma King and Último Guerrero defeated Pegasso and Toscano	Tag team match: Block B of the 2010 Gran Alternativa first round.	03:59
5	Durango Kid and El Texano Jr. defeated Ángel Azteca Jr. and Shocker	Tag team match: Block B of the 2010 Gran Alternativa first round.	06:19
6	Delta and Volador Jr. defeated Tiger Kid and El Felino	Tag team match: Block B of the 2010 Gran Alternativa first round.	05:32
7	Raziel and Averno defeated Guerrero Maya Jr. and Valiente	Tag team match: Block B of the 2010 Gran Alternativa first round.	04:00
8	Puma King and Último Guerrero defeated Durango Kid and El Texano Jr.	Tag team match: Block B of the 2010 Gran Alternativa second round.	03:44
9	Delta and Volador Jr. defeated Raziel and Valiente	Tag team match: Block B of the 2010 Gran Alternativa secondround.	06:28
10	Delta and Volador Jr. defeated Puma King and Último Guerrero	Tag team match: Block B of the 2010 Gran Alternativa final round.	07:08
11	Blue Panther, Místico and Jon Strongman defeated Los Guerreros del Infierno (Atlantis and Rey Bucanero) and Dragón Rojo Jr. – two falls to one	Best two out of three falls Six-man tag team match	15:50

== April 30, 2010 ==
CMLL Super Viernes
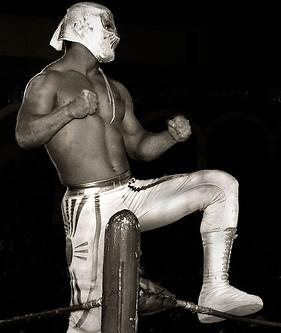
- Místico, on the losing side in the main event
- Promotion: Consejo Mundial de Lucha Libre (CMLL)
- Date: April 30, 2010
- City: Mexico City, Mexico
- Venue: Arena México

CMLL Super Viernes chronology
← Previous; Super Viernes April 23, 2010	Next → Super Viernes May 7, 2010

The April 30. 2010 Super Viernes show featured the finals of the torneo Gran Alternativa ("Great Alternative tournament") tag team tournament. The show was also a special Children's Day show where children under the age of 12 only had to pay 1 Peso for admission. While the Gran Alternativa was the event that received most publicity leading up to the show it was not the main event. The main event was an eight-man or Atómicos tag team match featuring the técnico team of Jon Strongman and Místico teaming up with two-thirds of the CMLL World Trios Champions El Hijo del Fantasma and La Máscara to take on the team of Último Guerrero, Dragón Rojo Jr. and La Ola Amarilla (Okumura and Taichi). The match featured an aggregation of storylines going into the match. Strongman and Último Guerrero had rivals since Strongman's debut in CMLL in 2009. Místico and Dragón Rojo Jr. had faced off in previous weeks with hostilities building between the two. Finally La Ola Amarilla had defeated the Trios Champions at previous events and were looking for a title match. The main event started at 11:20 PM local time, later than the Friday night shows usually ends. The first fall of the main event occurs after just 2 minutes and 38 as Último Guerrero pins Strongman and Dragón Rojo Jr. pinned Místico. In the second fall the técnico team gained control of the match after being overrun in the first fall as the 300 pound Strongman used his strength to take control of the match. The rúdo team regained control when they got Strongman out of the ring, leaving Hijo del Fantasma and La Máscara to fall victims to Okumura and Taichi for the second and deciding fall. Following the match Okumura and Taichi once again challenged the Trios champions to defend the title against them and Hiroshi Tanahashi who would visit Mexico the following week.

For weeks before the show Héctor Garza had been insisting that he was still a técnico, but his actions in the Gran Alternativa made those statements look insincere as he cheated throughout the tournament, including the main event. Delta and Volador Jr. showed some team unity by wearing similar masks for the match. The rúdos took advantage of Volador Jr. accidentally kicking the referee to foul their opponents before Garza Powerbombed Delta and Pólvora slammed Volador Jr. for the double pin. During the second fall Garza and Pólvora escaped to the ring to regroup, giving Delta the opportunity to show off his high flying, high risk offense as he leap off the top rope and took Garza down with a Flying headscissors much to the delight of the fans in the arena. Delta and Volador Jr. took the second fall after Delta executed a Moonsault on Garza. The third fall was a long, drawn out fall with several near falls. In the end Pólvora pinned both Volador Jr. and then Delta to win the tournament for his team.

The fourth match on the show was the culmination of several months of storylines between the Mini-Estrellas Bracito de Oro and Pequeño Black Warrior as they faced off on a Lucha de Apuestas, mask vs. mask match. Bracito de Oro came out with Brazo de Plata, brother of Brazo de Oro that Bracito was named after. Pequeño Black Warrior had Sangre Azteca in his corner to balance out Brazo de Oro. The two wrestlers immediately begin to pound away at each other with intensity until Pequeño Warrior gained control of the match. Pequeño Warrior weakened Bracito de Oro with two German suplexes followed by a splash from the top rope which allowed him to win the first fall. Bracito de Oro rallied the crowd behind him for the second fall, allowing him to win the second fall with the Brazos trademark senton. After the fall Brazo de Oro was thrown out of the arena for attacking Sangre Azteca during the match, which meant that Bracito de Oro was on his own for the third and deciding fall. The Mini-Estrellas fought out to the floor where Pequeño Black Warrior landed a flying leg-drop on Bracito de Oro off the ramp. Back inside the ring Bracito de Oro was able to apply the same half-Boston Crab move that he used to win the match on the previous Super viernes, but this time was not able to force Pequeño Black Warrior to submit. After a rope break Pequeño Warrior fights back and is able to slam Bracito de Oro to the ground with an Uranage and gain the pinfall. During Pequeño Warrior's victory celebrations ringside doctors examine Bracito's shoulder to see if he had been seriously injured. Afterwards Bracito de Oro invited his wife and daughters to join him in the ring as he removed his mask, then announced that his name was Roberto Rodriguez Aguirre, that he was 45 years old and had been wrestling for 25 years.

The third match of the evening was the first Super Viernes women's match since the March 5, 2010 Super Viernes. It featured Total Nonstop Action Wrestling (TNA) Dark Angel (who wrestles as Sarah Stock in TNA), teaming up with Lady Apache and Luna Magica to face Mima Shimoda and two thirds of La Zorras ("The Foxes"; Hiroka and Princesa Blanca). The teams split the two first falls between them going to a third fall that includes a segment where Dark Angel leaps off the top rope onto her opponent on the floor. In the end Dark Angel, Lady Apache and Luna Magica each apply a submission hold to their opponents to gain the third and deciding fall.

The first two matches of the show were both standard tag team matches. In the opening match the team of Leono and Starman defeated Bronco and Inquisidor in 12 minutes, 47 seconds. The second match of the evening saw Metro and Fuego take on Los Cancerberos del Infierno (Euforia and Raziel), as part of a slow building feud between Los Cancerberos and the group of Metro, Fuego, Stuka Jr. and Máscara Dorada. On the night the técnico team of Metro and Fuego won two falls to one when Metro pinned Euphoria after a German Suplex.

No.	Results	Stipulations	Times
1	Leono and Starman defeated Bronco and Inquisidor	Tag team match	12:47
2	Metro and Fuego defeated Los Cancerberos del Infierno (Euforia and Raziel)	Tag team match	16:25
3	Dark Angel, Lady Apache and Luna Magica defeated Hiroka, Mima Shimoda and Princesa Blanca	Best two out of three falls Six-man tag team match	14:33
4	Pequeño Black Warrior defeated Bracito de Oro – two falls to one	Lucha de Apuestas, mask vs. mask match	12:19
5	Pólvora and Héctor Garza defeated Delta and Volador Jr. – two falls to one	Tag team match: Finals of the 2010 Gran Alternativa tournament	23:46
6	Último Guerrero, Dragón Rojo Jr. and La Ola Amarilla (Okumura and Taichi) defeated El Hijo del Fantasma, La Máscara, Jon Strongman and Místico – two falls to none	Best two out of three falls Eight-man tag team match	10:20
