= CMLL Super Viernes (January 2010) =

Mexican Professional wrestling show summary

In January 2010, Mexican professional wrestling promotion Consejo Mundial de Lucha Libre (CMLL) held five CMLL Super Viernes shows, all of which took place Arena México on Friday nights. CMLL did not hold any special events on Fridays that would force a cancellation such as a pay-per-view (PPV). Some of the matches from Super Viernes are taped for CMLL's weekly shows that air in Mexico the week following the Super Viernes show. Super Viernes often features storyline feud between two wrestlers or group of wrestlers that develop from week to week, often coming to a conclusion at a major CMLL event or in a match on Friday nights between the individuals. In total, Super Viernes featured 31 matches in total of which 15 were part of a tournament. 81 wrestlers in total appeared in matches during January, including two women and eleven Mini-Estrella. CMLL only held one match featuring the women's division, a Torneo cibernetico featuring the Mini-Etrellas and four Lightning matches in total. Último Guerrero and Héctor Garza are the only wrestlers to appear on four Super Vierens shows in January, no wrestler appeared on all five shows.

January started out slowly with the show on January 1 featuring very little storyline development as CMLL slowly began their 2010 "season". Storylines began to develop on January 8, 2010 with the main one being the building tension as Héctor Garza and his team defeated Último Guerrero's team. This match led to a singles match between the two the following week which Garza won. The win earned Garza a chance to wrestled for Último Guerrero's CMLL World Heavyweight Championship on January 22. January, the first title match of 2010. January also saw Pequeño Black Warrior win a Mini-Estrella Torneo cibernetico match over seven other wrestlers, making him the first Mini-Estrella to feature prominently on the Super Viernes show. While the start of January was light on storylines, the dominating storyline of the last half of January the Torneo Nacional de Parejas Increibles tournament and the beginning of Místico's Rúdo ("Villain") turn while building a feud with Volador Jr.

== January 1, 2010 ==
CMLL Super Viernes
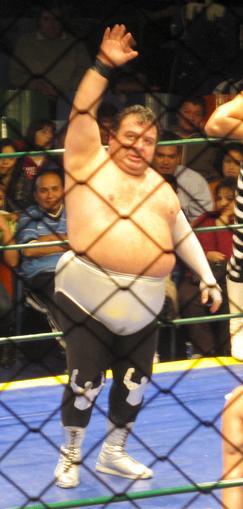
- Brazo de Plata, won the first main event of the year
- Promotion: Consejo Mundial de Lucha Libre (CMLL)
- Date: January 1, 2010
- City: Mexico City, Mexico
- Venue: Arena México

CMLL Super Viernes chronology
← Previous; Sin Salida	Next → Super Viernes January 8, 2010

The January 1, 2010 Super Viernes show was the first show in the 2010 "Season", CMLL returned from its Christmas break with a show on the first day of the new year. The show featured no major storyline developments, featuring CMLL's "formula" with a tag team opening match between four low ranked wrestlers, a "lighting" (Relampago) match or one fall match and a number of Best two out of three falls Six-man tag team match, the most common match format used in CMLL.

The main event featured CMLL's top tecnico ("Fan favorite") Místico teaming up with Máscara Dorada and Brazo de Plata who had recently returned to CMLL after several years of working for other promotions. The trio defeated Los Hijos del Averno ("The Sons of Hell"), one of CMLL's top Rúdo ("Villain") groups in the form of El Terrible, El Texano, Jr. and Mephisto. After the main event Místico challenged Averno to put his mask on the line in a Lucha de Apuesta' (bet match). Averno returned the challenge for Místico to defend the Mexican National Light Heavyweight Championship against either of Los Hijos del Averno.

No.	Results	Stipulations
1	Guerrero Maya, Jr. and Starman defeated Los Hombres del Camoflaje (Artillero and Súper Comando)	Best two out of three falls Tag team match
2	Los Ángeles Celestiales (Ángel Azteca, Jr., Ángel de Oro and Ángel de Plata) defeated Guerreros Tuareg (Arkangel de la Muerte, Loco Max and Skandalo) by disqualification	Six-man tag team match
3	Hiroka defeated Marcela	Lightning match (One fall, 10 minute time-limit match)
4	Máximo, Metro and Stuka, Jr. defeated Los Cancerberos del Infierno (Virus, Euforia and Pólvora)	Six-man tag team match
5	El Sagrado, La Máscara and Toscano defeated Rey Bucanero and Poder Mexica (Sangre Azteca and Dragón Rojo, Jr.)	Six-man tag team match
6	Brazo de Plata, Máscara Dorada and Místico defeated Los Hijos del Averno (El Terrible, El Texano, Jr. and Mephisto)	Six-man tag team match

== January 8, 2010 ==
CMLL Super Viernes
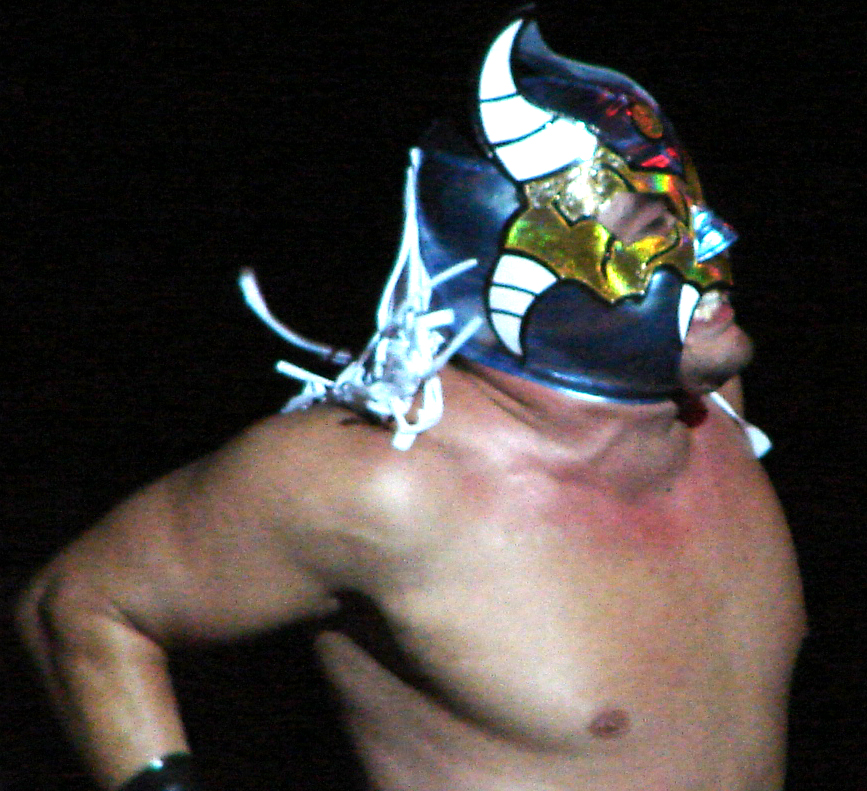
- Averno, won in the fourth match
- Promotion: Consejo Mundial de Lucha Libre (CMLL)
- Date: January 8, 2010
- City: Mexico City, Mexico
- Venue: Arena México

CMLL Super Viernes chronology
← Previous; Super Viernes January 1, 2010	Next → Super Viernes January 15, 2010

The January 8, 2010 Super Viernes show, like the January 1 show, did not really build on any existing issues between wrestlers, but did see the first build to a CMLL World Heavyweight Championship match at a later date. The main event match, a trios match between Héctor Garza, Jon Strongman and Místico and the Los Guerreros de la Atlantida group consisting of Atlantis, Rey Bucanero and Último Guerrero, which ended with Último Guerrero causing his team to be disqualified due excessive violence, thus losing the third and deciding fall. After the match Garza challenged Último Guerrero to defend the CMLL World Heavyweight Championship against him, to which Guerrero responded that if Garza could beat him in a singles match next week he would put the title on the line.

The undercard featured CMLL's Mini-Estrella division as Pequeño Nitro, Pequeño Violencia and Pierrothito teamed up to defeat the trio of Astral, Eléctrico and Pequeño Olímpico. The show also saw the return of Naito, only days after he, along with Yujiro, won the IWGP Tag Team Championship in Japan. Naito had an extended tour of Mexico in the latter half of 2009 and decided to return to Mexico between tours with New Japan Pro-Wrestling. Naito teamed up with Okumura, signalling that the group La Ola Amarilla ("The Yellow Wave") was still alive. The two, along with Euforia lost to Shocker, Toscano and Volador Jr.

No.	Results	Stipulations
1	Diamante and Starman defeated Durango Kid and Inquisidor	Best two out of three falls Tag team match
2	Pequeño Nitro, Pequeño Violencia and Pierrothito defeated Astral, Eléctrico and Pequeño Olímpico	Six-man tag team match
3	Loco Max defeated Ángel Azteca Jr.	Lightning match (One fall, 10 minute time-limit match)
4	Los Hijos del Averno (Averno and Ephesto) and Virus defeated La Máscara, Stuka, Jr. and Valiente	Six-man tag team match
5	Shocker, Toscano and Volador Jr. defeated Euforia and La Ola Amarilla (Okumura and Naito)	Six-man tag team match
6	Héctor Garza, Jon Strongman and Místico defeated Los Guerreros de la Atlantida (Atlantis, Rey Bucanero and Último Guerrero) by disqualification	Six-man tag team match

== January 15, 2010 ==
CMLL Super Viernes
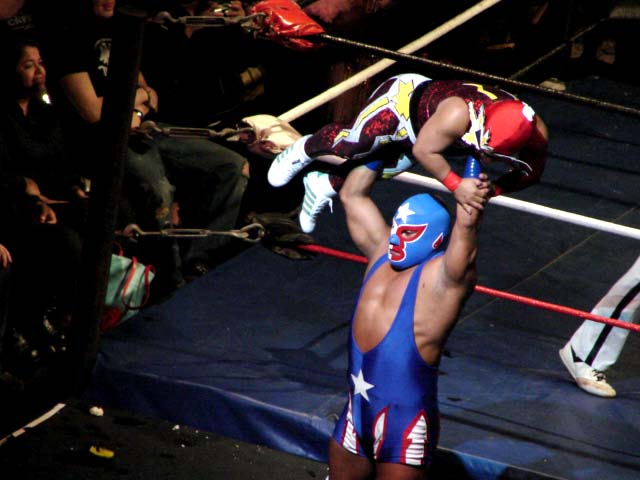
- Pierrothito (in blue), participant in the Torneo cibernetico
- Promotion: Consejo Mundial de Lucha Libre (CMLL)
- Date: January 15, 2010
- City: Mexico City, Mexico
- Venue: Arena México

CMLL Super Viernes chronology
← Previous; Super Viernes January 8, 2010	Next → Super Viernes January 22, 2010

The main event of the January 15, 2010 Super Viernes show was a continuation of an issue between Héctor Garza and Último Guerrero that had begun during a Trios match the previous week. On January 15 the two faced off in a singles match as the main event of the show, a match that saw Garza pin Último Guerrero for the first fall, Guerrero even the score by winning the second fall. After a closely contested match Garza won the third and decisive fall and demanded a match for Último Guerrero's CMLL World Heavyweight Championship, a match Guerrero agreed to, booked for the following week.

The undercard featured an eight-Mini-Estrella Torneo cibernetico contest. The order of elimination was : Pequeño Nitro, Shockercito, Fantasy, Pierrothito, Pequeño Olímpico and Pequeño Violencia. The final saw Pequeño Black Warrior win when he pinned Último Dragoncito, becoming the first Mini-Estrella to gain a high profile victory on Super Viernes in 2010. This was Último Dragoncito's first match back after suffering serious burns from a car accident in the fall of 2009.

The show was also supposed to feature Ray Mendoza, Jr. teaming up with La Ola Amarilla ("The Yellow Wave"; Okumura and Naito), but he had to be replaced by his brother Villano IV as Mendoza, Jr. missed the show for medical reasons. This was the first time in six months that Villano IV had wrestled in Arena México. Naito, Okumura and Vilaño V defeated Ángel de Oro, El Hijo del Fantasma and Metro.

No.	Results	Stipulations
1	Tigre Blanco and Starman defeated Los Hombres del Camoflaje (Artillero and Súper Comando) by disqualification	Best two out of three falls Tag team match
2	Pequeño Black Warrior defeated Fantasy, Pequeño Nitro, Pequeño Olímpico, Pequeño Violencia, Pierrothito, Shockercito and Último Dragoncito	Pequeno Reyes del Aire 2010 – Eight-Minis Torneo cibernetico
3	Raziel defeated Ángel de Plata	Lightning match (One fall, 10 minute time-limit match)
4	La Ola Amarilla (Okumura and Naito) and Villano IV defeated Ángel de Oro, El Hijo del Fantasma and Metro	Six-man tag team match
5	El Terrible, El Texano Jr. and Vangelis defeated Brazo de Plata, Máscara Dorada and Volador Jr.	Six-man tag team match
6	Héctor Garza defeated Último Guerrero	Best two-out-of-three falls match

== January 22, 2010 ==
CMLL Super Viernes
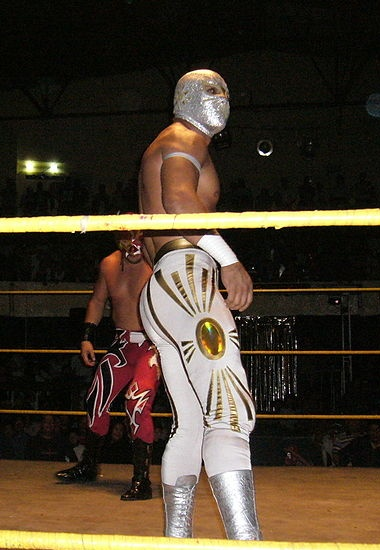
- Místico, turned rudo during the show
- Promotion: Consejo Mundial de Lucha Libre (CMLL)
- Date: January 22, 2010
- City: Mexico City, Mexico
- Venue: Arena México

CMLL Super Viernes chronology
← Previous; Super Viernes January 15, 2010	Next → Super Viernes January 29, 2010

While the main event of the January 22, 2010 Super Viernes show was a CMLL World Heavyweight Championship match between champion Último Guerrero and Héctor Garza the main focus of the show was the first block of CMLL's first ever Torneo Nacional de Parejas Increibles tournament. In the main event Último Guerrero successfully defended the CMLL World Heavyweight Championship against Héctor Garza, winning two falls to one. This was Último Guerrero's 8th successful title defense since winning it on December 22, 2008.

The Nacional Parejas Increibles tournament featured wrestlers who do not usually team up, in fact most of the teams are on opposite sides of the Tecnico/Rudo (Fan favorite/villain) divide. The teams each represented the region where they went to wrestling school, representing Mexico City, Guadalajara, Jalisco, the Lagunero region and Nuevo León in the tournament. To determine the match-ups in the tournament a representative of each team entered a Battle royal where the order of elimination determined when the team would wrestle in the first round – the first two wrestlers eliminated would face off, then the next two and the next two, with the final two men in the ring facing off in the last of the opening round matches. The battle royal included El Terrible, El Hijo del Fantasma, Averno, Dragón Rojo, Jr., Euforia, Máscara Dorada, Máximo and Misterioso II. After the match order was determined the actual tournament began. The first match saw Atlantis and Mascara Dorada defeat Dragón Rojo, Jr. and La Sombra. While Atlantis is a Rudo the team got along without any problems, Atlantis wore his own Tecnico white mask and wrestled a tecnico style to complement Mascara Dorada. The second match saw Máximo and Mr. Niebla form a team that quickly earned the nickname La Peste con Amour, "the Love Plague", born from Mr. Niebla being part of La Peste Negra ("the Black Plague") and Máximo's Exótico ring character. The team won when Máximo kissed Blue Panther or Misterioso II, distracting him long enough for Mr. Niebla to sneak up behind him to roll him up for the pinfall. The third first round match paired longtime rivals Místico, CMLL's top Tecnico up with Averno, one of CMLL's top Rudos together to face Euforia and Averno's regular partner Ephesto. Místico and Averno came out with a surprising show of unity as they both wore masks that melded their own masks with their partner's mask, the arch-enemies got along in the match, handily winning it. The last match saw El Terrible and Volador Jr. defeat Hijo del Fantasma and Mephisto to earn their way to the quarter finals.

Atlantis and Máscara Dorada defeated La Pestre con Amour when Máximo tried to kiss Atlantis to distract him, but ended up kissing Mr. Niebla instead, making him susceptible to a roll-up and pinfall. The most talked about storyline of the evening took place in the second quarter final match as Místico and Averno took on Volador Jr. and El Terrible. Up until that night Místico and Volador Jr. (Along with La Sombra had formed a trio called "Super sky Team", but on the night of the 22 that partnership ended. During the match Místico wrestled a much more aggressive, Rudo style especially when in the ring with Volador Jr. Mistico would tear up Volador's mask and win by cheating. Following the match Místico kept attacking Volador Jr.

The semi-final match once again saw Místico continue his newly found Rudo ways, tearing at Máscara Dorada's mask and wrestling a more brutal style than he usually wrestled. In the end Atlantis forced Averno to submit to win a place in the finals of the match. Initially it was thought that Místico's rudo tactics were just because he was teamed up with Averno, leaving his true allegiance up in the air at the moment.

No.	Results	Stipulations	Times
1	Apocalipsis and Inquisidor defeated Sensei and Trueno	Best two out of three falls Tag team match	16:12
2	Diamante, Metalico and Pegasso defeated Bronco and Guerreros Tuareg (Doctor X and Hooligan)	Six-man tag team match	11:37
3	Ángel de Oro, Fuego and Metro defeated Los Cancerberos del Infierno (Cancerbero, Raziel and Virus) by disqualification	Six-man tag team match	08:07
4	El Terrible and El Hijo del Fantasma defeated Averno, Dragón Rojo, Jr., Euforia, Máscara Dorada, Máximo and Misterioso II	Battle Royal	03:50
5	Atlantis and Mascara Dorada defeated Dragón Rojo, Jr. and La Sombra	Torneo Nacional de Parejas Increibles tournament first round tag team match	07:28
6	Máximo and Mr. Niebla defeated Blue Panther and Misterioso II	Torneo Nacional de Parejas Increibles tournament first round tag team match	07:11
7	Averno and Místico defeated Ephesto and Euforia	Torneo Nacional de Parejas Increibles tournament first round tag team match	03:48
8	El Terrible and Volador Jr. defeated El Hijo del Fantasma and Mephisto	Torneo Nacional de Parejas Increibles tournament first round tag team match	05:31
9	Atlantis and Mascara Dorada defeated Máximo and Mr. Niebla	Torneo Nacional de Parejas Increibles tournament quarterfinal tag team match	02:20
10	Averno and Místico defeated El Terrible and Volador Jr.	Torneo Nacional de Parejas Increibles tournament quarterfinal tag team match	08:08
11	Atlantis and Mascara Dorada defeated Averno and Místico	Torneo Nacional de Parejas Increibles tournament semifinal tag team match	05:00
12	Último Guerrero (c) defeated Héctor Garza	Best two-out-of-three falls match for the CMLL World Heavyweight Championship	—
(c) / – the champion(s) heading into the match

== January 29, 2010 ==
CMLL Super Viernes
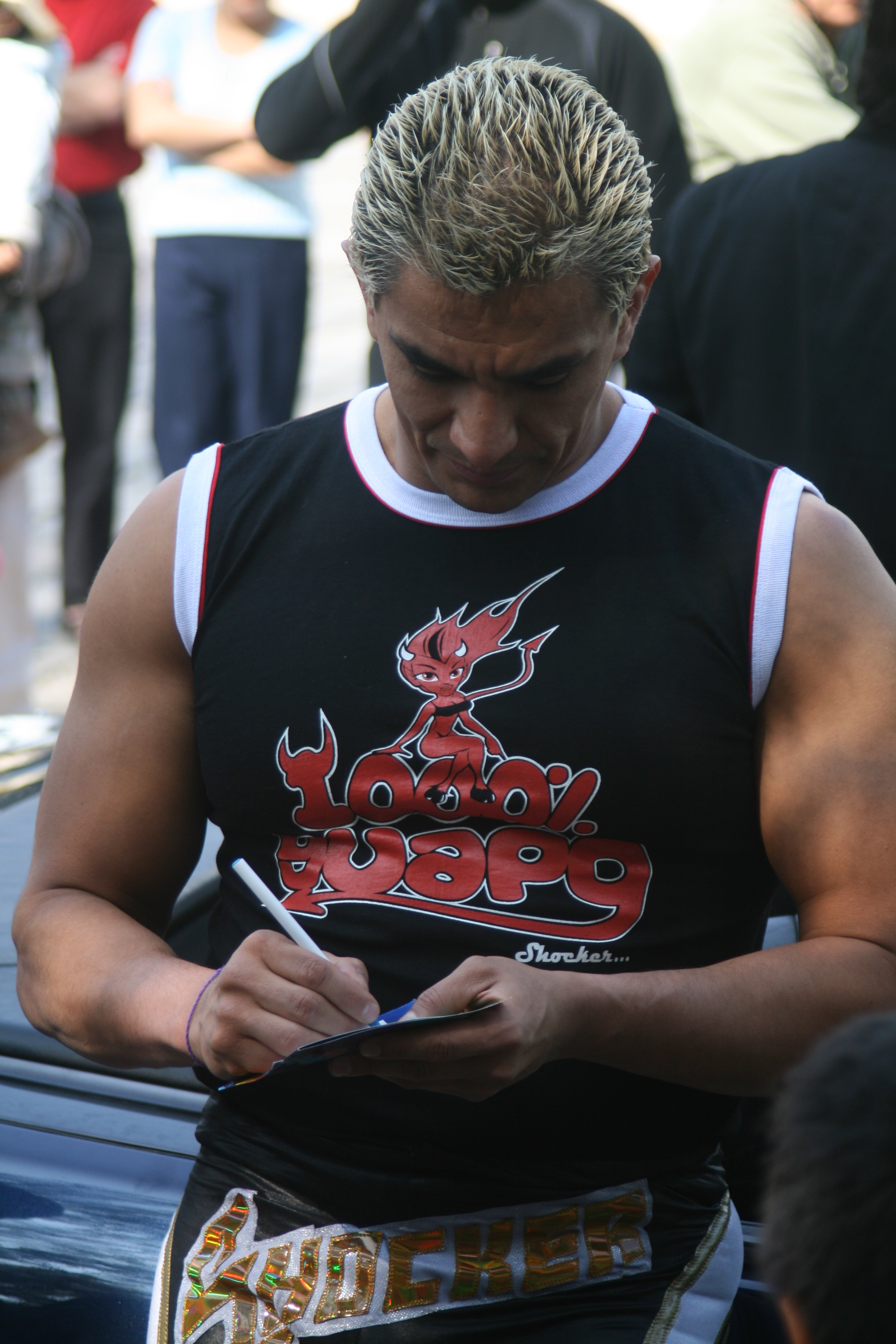
- Shocker, teamed with Valiente for the tournament
- Promotion: Consejo Mundial de Lucha Libre (CMLL)
- Date: January 29, 2010
- City: Mexico City, Mexico
- Venue: Arena México

CMLL Super Viernes chronology
← Previous; Super Viernes January 22, 2010	Next → Super Viernes February 5, 2010

The second bracket of the Torneo Nacional de Parejas Increibles tournament took place on the January 29, 2010 Super Viernes show, with the tournament also taking the main event spot. The undercard saw a six-Mini-Estrellas match between Bracito de Oro, Mascarita Dorada and Último Dragoncito and Pequeño Damián 666, Pequeño Black Warrior and Pierrothito, the final fall saw Bracito de Oro force Pequeño Black Warrior to submit. Following the match Pequeño Black Warrior attacked Bracito de Oro, ripping at his mask. ALso on the undercard Ángel Azteca, Jr., Pegasso and Rey Cometa defeated Guerreros Tuareg (Arkangel de la Muerte, Loco Max and Skandalo) in two straight falls when Guerreros Tuarego threw Ángel Azteca, Jr. over the top rope for a disqualification. The main focus of the match was the feud between Ángel Azteca, Jr. and Arkangel de la Muerte, a storyline that plays off the fact that Arkangel defeated Ángel Azteca in a Lucha de Apuesta match in 2003 to unmask him.

The second block of the Torneo Nacional de Parejas Increibles tournament saw an eight-man Battle Royal to determine the pairings for the tournament. The match included El Sagrado, Ray Mendoza, Jr., Stuka, Jr.La Máscara, Rush, Sangre Azteca, Toscano and Valiente with Ray Mendoza Jr. and Stuka Jr. being the last two men in the ring. In the first round El Sagrado and Shocker defeated Rey Bucanero and Valiente, Negro Casas and La Mascara defeated El Texano, Jr. and Rush, Héctor Garza and Toscano defeated El Felino and Sangre Azteca and finally Último Guerrero and Stuka, Jr. defeated Ray Mendoza, Jr. and Brazo de Plata. The longest first round match went 05:11 while the shortest match was 03:52. In the second round La Mascara and Negro Casas defeated Shocker and El Sagrado while Garza and Toscano defeated the bracket favorites Último Guerrero and Stuka, Jr. While Toscano and Garza were both Tecnicos (fan favorites) and had teamed before it was the Rudo (villain)/tecnico team of Negro Casas and La Mascara who worked best together and won the semi-final match, earning the right to face Atlantis and Máscara Dorada the following week for the Torneo Nacional de Parejas Increibles tournament trophy.

No.	Results	Stipulations	Times
1	Diamante and Sensei defeated Artillero and Durango Kid	Best two out of three falls Tag team match	11:30
2	Bracito de Oro, Mascarita Dorada and Último Dragoncito defeated Pequeño Damián 666, Pequeño Black Warrior and Pierrothito	Six-man tag team match	14:41
3	Ángel Azteca, Jr., Pegasso and Rey Cometa defeated Guerreros Tuareg (Arkangel de la Muerte, Loco Max and Skandalo) by disqualification	Six-man tag team match	08:07
4	Ray Mendoza Jr. and Stuka Jr. defeated El Sagrado, La Máscara, Rush, Sangre Azteca, Toscano and Valiente	Battle Royal	04:25
5	El Sagrado and Shocker defeated Rey Bucanero and Valiente	Torneo Nacional de Parejas Increibles tournament first round tag team match	05:11
6	La Máscara and Negro Casas defeated El Texano Jr. and Rouge	Torneo Nacional de Parejas Increibles tournament first round tag team match	04:11
7	Héctor Garza and Toscano defeated El Felino and Sangre Azteca	Torneo Nacional de Parejas Increibles tournament first round tag team match	03:52
8	Stuka Jr. and Último Guerrero defeated Brazo de Plata and Ray Mendoza Jr.	Torneo Nacional de Parejas Increibles tournament first round tag team match	04:40
9	La Máscara and Negro Casas defeated El Sagrado and Shocker	Torneo Nacional de Parejas Increibles tournament quarterfinal tag team match	05:39
10	Héctor Garza and Toscano defeated Stuka Jr. and Último Guerrero	Torneo Nacional de Parejas Increibles tournament quarterfinal tag team match	05:05
11	La Máscara and Negro Casas defeated Héctor Garza and Toscano	Torneo Nacional de Parejas Increibles tournament semifinal tag team match	05:10
