= CMLL Super Viernes (March 2010) =

Mexican Professional wrestling show summary

In March 2010 Mexican professional wrestling promotion Consejo Mundial de Lucha Libre (CMLL) held three CMLL Super Viernes shows, all of which took place Arena México on Friday nights. On Friday March 19, CMLL held a pay-per-view (PPV) instead, replacing the regular Super Viernes show. Some of the matches from Super Viernes are taped for CMLL's weekly shows that air in Mexico the week following the Super Viernes show. Super Viernes often features storyline feud between two wrestlers or group of wrestlers that develop from week to week, often coming to a conclusion at a major CMLL event or in a match on Friday nights between the individuals. In total Super Viernes featured 18 matches and 67 wrestlers appeared in matches during March, including six women and six Mini-Estrella. CMLL only held one match featuring the women's division, two featuring the Mini-Etrellas and four Lightning matches. El Felino, Negro Casas, Volador Jr., La Sombra and Último Guerrero are the only wrestlers to appear on all three Super Vierens shows in March.

The featured storyline throughout March centered on the build-up to the main event of the Homenaje a Dos Leyendas that took place on March 19, 2010 and involved Místico and El Felino going against La Sombra and Volador Jr. with their mask on the line. The main events of both shows leading up to the event saw Místico team with El Felino and Negro Casas to take on Volador Jr., La Sombra and either Máscara Doradaor La Máscara. Mascara Dorada was injured during the March 5, 2010Súper Luchas and had to be replaced by La Máscara in the following week. The storyline between the four did not conclude right after Dos Leyendas as the now unmasked Felino was cheered by the crowd during his first unmasked match while La Sombra, who won the mask from Felino, was more or less ignored by the crowd.

Super Viernes also focused on a feud between Mini-Estrella Pequeño Black Warrior and Bracito de Oro. The storyline had started in January and continued through March without a clear resolution. Not all the events of March were scripted, especially the firing of Mini-Estrella Mascarita Dorada who was fired by CMLL for on working a tour of Europe that CMLL did not approve off. By the end of March the name appeared on the CMLL booking sheet for the April 2, 2010 Super Viernes, leading to speculation that CMLL may have given the name and outfit to another wrestler. It turned out to be the original Mascarita Dorada who may have mended fences with CMLL.

== March 5, 2010 ==
CMLL Super Viernes
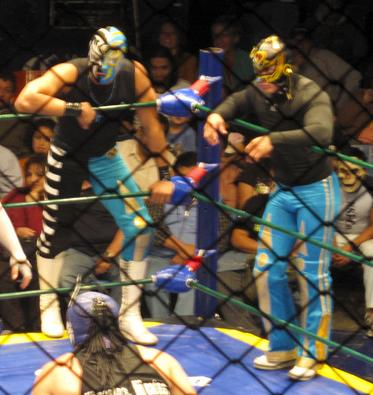
- La Sombra (left) and Volador Jr. (right) teamed with Máscara Dorada in victory.
- Promotion: Consejo Mundial de Lucha Libre (CMLL)
- Date: March 5, 2010
- City: Mexico City, Mexico
- Venue: Arena México

CMLL Super Viernes chronology
← Previous; Super Viernes February 26, 2010	Next → Super Viernes March 12, 2010

The main event of the March 5, 2010 Super Viernes was a repeat of the main event from the previous week as Volador Jr., La Sombra and Máscara Dorada faced Místico and La Peste Negra (El Felino and Negro Casas), building to the main event of the 2010 Homenaje a Dos Leyendas, a match between Volador Jr., La Sombra, Místico and El Felino where two of the wrestlers will put their mask on the line. The main event started with Místico, El Felino and Negro Casas coming to the ring first, waiting for the tecnico (fan favorite) team to come out. During the entrance of Volador Jr., La Sombra and Mascara Dorada the Rudo (villain) team attacked them with Místico and Volador Jr. fighting on the ramp. The first fall ended when El Felino was disqualified for kicking El Felino in the groin. Following the disqualification El Felino tore La Sombra's mask off so that he had to go back to the locker rooms and get a new mask before the second fall could start. In the second fall the rudo team dominated early on but Volador and his team fought back, regaining control through their teamwork. At one point Místico and Volador Jr. fought outside the ring with the crowd being split in their support for Volador Jr. and Místico. During the second fall Mascara Dorada ended up hurting himself as he leapt from the ring and was on the floor for the remainder of the fall. The tecnico team gained the victory when Volador Jr. and La Sombra double-teamed Místico with a Spanish Fly (A move where the two wrestlers throw their opponent off the top rope) and a pinfall, winning the match two falls to none. After the match Mascara Dorada was removed from ringside on a stretcher.

In the semi-main event the building storyline between Último Guerrero and Jon Strongman continued as Los Guerreros del Atlántida (Guerrero, Atlantis and Rey Bucanero) took on Strongman, Shocker and La Máscara in a traditional Best two out of three falls Six-man tag team match. The first fall saw Strongman pin Atlantis while Shocker forced both Guerrero and Bucanero to submit in 3 minutes and 56 seconds. When Strongman was in the ring he dominated the opposition due to his sheer size, only giving Los Guerreros an advantage when his partners were in the ring. The second fall came after 4 minutes and 19 seconds when Los Guerreros applied a "Triple Crab on Shocker and La Máscara to force the submission, tying the score one to one. The final fall saw Los Guerreros all team up to overcome Strongman, applying a powerbomb that took all three wrestlers to execute, followed by a pinfall victory for Los Guerreros.

The undercard saw Los Hijos del Averno (Mephisto and Ephesto) and Vangelis defeat the team of Valiente, Stuka, Jr. and Metro as Los Hijos and Vangelis won the first and the third fall. In the Lighting match veteran Raziel defeated CMLL rookie Diamante, needing less than six minutes of the 10-minute time limit.

No.	Results	Stipulations	Times
1	Sensei and Metálico defeated Disturbio and Durango Kid	Best two out of three falls Tag team match	13:09
2	Dark Angel, Lady Apache and Lluvia defeated Hiroka, Mima Shimoda and Princesa Sujei	Six-man tag team match	11:05
3	Raziel defeated Diamante	Lightning match (One fall, 10 minute time-limit match)	05:41
4	Los Hijos del Averno (Mephisto and Ephesto) and Vangelis defeated Valiente, Stuka, Jr. and Metro	Six-man tag team match	17:27
5	Los Guerreros del Atlántida (Atlantis, Rey Bucanero and Último Guerrero) defeated Jon Strongman, Shocker and La Máscara	Six-man tag team match	13:24
6	Volador Jr., La Sombra and Máscara Dorada defeated Místico and La Peste Negra (El Felino and Negro Casas)	Six-man tag team match	15:35

== March 12, 2010 ==
CMLL Super Viernes
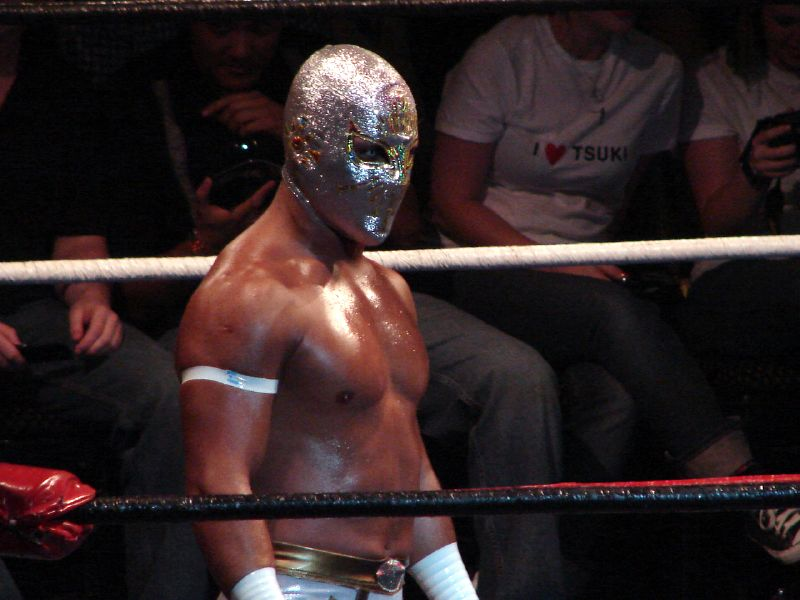
- Místico defeated his arch-enemy in the main event
- Promotion: Consejo Mundial de Lucha Libre (CMLL)
- Date: March 12, 2010
- City: Mexico City, Mexico
- Venue: Arena México

CMLL Super Viernes chronology
← Previous; Super Viernes March 5, 2010	Next → Homenaje a Dos Leyendas (2010)

The main event of the March 12, 2010 Super Viernes was originally scheduled to be Volador Jr., La Sombra and Máscara Dorada facing Místico and La Peste Negra (El Felino and Negro Casas) for the third week in a row. In the days before the event it was announced that La Máscara would replace Mascara Dorada in the match, due to the injure he suffered during the previous week's show. The show was the last Super Viernes show before the 2010 Homenaje a Dos Leyendas and the main event built directly to the main event of Homenaje a Dos Leyendas. While there was an underlying storyline between Negro Casas and La Máscara (who had teamed up for the Nacional Parejas Incredibles tournament) the main focus was naturally the storyline between Místico, Volador, Jr, El Felino and La Sombra. The match quickly ran out of control of the referee as Místico and Volador Jr. fought outside the ring throughout the entire first fall. At one point Místico threw a glass of beer at Volador Jr. and later on powerbombed him on the commentator's table, a tactic that's more unusual in Mexico than in the US. The first fall ended when La Máscara forced Negro Casas to submit and Volador Jr. pinned El Felino. During the second fall La Sombra began limping due to an injury he had suffered the previous week, something El Felino took full advantage off and pinned La Sombra after an elbow off the top rope. Negro Casas clinched the second fall for his team by forcing Volador Jr. to submit to a Boston Crab submission hold. Místico's team got the third and deciding pinfall after 8:31 of action, the first Super Viernes victory for Místico since he turned Rudo in late January. The victory came at a price though, while Místico was gloating about knocking Volador Jr. down with a move El Felino snug in behind his partner's back and pinned Volador Jr. for the victory. While El Felino and Negro Casas celebrated their victory a frustrated Místico left the arena without even acknowledging the victory.

The semi-main event featured Blue Panther, Brazo de Plata and Héctor Garza taking on the team of Mr. Niebla and Los Guerreros del Atlántida (Atlantis and Último Guerrero). The interaction between Mr. Niebla and Brazo the Plata, who is the father of Niebla's tag team partner Máximo was one of the key storylines in the match, but in the end it came down to Último Guerrero pretending that Héctor Garza had landed a low blow and convinced the referee to disqualify the team of Garza, Brazo de Plata and Blue Panther. Following the match Garza complained that the referee always seemed to side with Guerrero in these matters.

The Lighing match saw the rivalry of Pequeño Black Warrior and Bracito de Oro build even further. During the match Bracito de Oro dove out of the ring and ended up cutting his arm on something, leaving him bleeding and favoring the hurt arm. The injury forced the two to cut the match short as Pequeño Black Warrior abruptly pulled Bracito de Oro's mask off to force a disqualification. After the match Bracito de Oro received medical attention but was fortunately not injured too severely as he wrestled again only a few days later March 15, 2010.

In other matches: The CMLL Arena Coliseo Tag Team Champions Fuego and Stuka, Jr. teamed up with newcomer Rush to defeat Los Cancerberos del Infierno (Virus, Euforia and Pólvora). Los Cancerberos have been constant rivals for the Coliseo Tag Team champions and want to challenge Stuka, Jr., Máscara Dorada and Metro for the Mexican National Trios Championship at some point. The experienced Rudo (villain) team Guerreros Tuareg (Doctor X, Hooligan and Nitro defeated the rookie team of Delta, Diamante and Guerrero Maya, Jr. in the segunda (second match) of the night. In the opening match rookie Métalico teamed up with the veteran Tigre Blanco to defeat Camora and Zayco in what was Camorra and Zayco's first Super Viernes match of 2010.

No.	Results	Stipulations	Times
1	Metálico and Tigre Blanco defeated Camorra and Zayco	Best two out of three falls Tag team match	11:51
2	Guerreros Tuareg (Doctor X, Hooligan and Nitro defeated Delta, Diamante and Guerrero Maya Jr.	Six-man tag team match	11:57
3	Bracito de Oro defeated Pequeño Black Warrior by disqualification	Lightning match (One fall, 10 minute time-limit match)	04:36
4	Fuego, Stuka, Jr. and Rush defeated Los Cancerberos del Infierno (Virus, Euforia and Pólvora)	Six-man tag team match	14:24
5	Mr. Niebla and Los Guerreros del Atlántida (Atlantis and Último Guerrero) defeated Blue Panther, Brazo de Plata and Héctor Garza	Six-man tag team match	12:03
6	Místico and La Peste Negra (El Felino and Negro Casas) defeated Volador Jr., La Sombra and La Máscara	Six-man tag team match	19:49

== March 19, 2010 ==
On March 19, 2010 CMLL replaced their regular Super Viernes show with the 2010 Homenaje a Dos Leyendas ("Homage to Two Legends") show that takes place in Arena México

== March 26, 2010 ==
CMLL Super Viernes
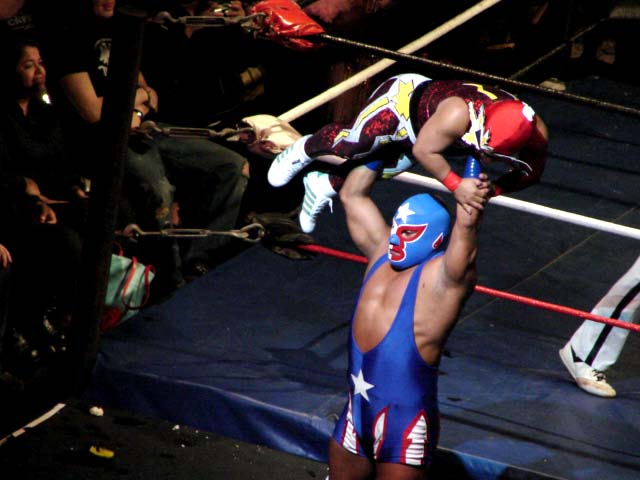
- Pierrothito, wrestled in the second match of the night
- Promotion: Consejo Mundial de Lucha Libre (CMLL)
- Date: March 26, 2010
- City: Mexico City, Mexico
- Venue: Arena México

CMLL Super Viernes chronology
← Previous; Homenaje a Dos Leyendas (2010)	Next → Super Viernes April 2, 2010

The March 26, 2010 Super Viernes was the first wrestling appearance of El Felino after losing his mask to La Sombra the previous Friday at the 2010 Homenaje a Dos Leyendas. The main event of the show featured Sombra teaming with Volador Jr. and Shocker against La Peste Negra (Negro Casas and El Felino) and Último Guerrero. While Felino was on the rudo (bad guy) side of the match he was the clear crowd favorite, being called a "Rudo idol" by SuperLuchas Magazine. The match saw Sombra, Volador Jr. and Shocker win two falls to one when El Felino fouled La Sombra in clear view of the referee for the disqualification, which was only a background to Felino being cheered and La Sombra being mostly ignored by the crowd.

In the semi-main event El Texano, Jr. and El Terrible had to put their storyline feud with the Japanese La Ola Amarilla ("The Yellow Wave") to the side as they teamed up with Ola Amarilla member Taichi to take on the makeshift team of Blue Panther, Héctor Garza and Brazo de Plata. Máximo was originally scheduled to team with his father, but was replaced by Blue Panther at the night of the show without an explanation. Texano, Jr. was able to gain the third and deciding fall over Garza after a miscommunication between Garza and Brazo de Plata. Following the match the two argued over the outcome of the match as Texano, Jr., Terrible and Taichi celebrated their victory.

The Lightning match of the evening saw Toscano defeat Ephesto in just over 7 minutes, potentially setting Toscano up as a challenger for the CMLL World Light Heavyweight Championship that Ephesto holds. The third match of the evening saw the thrown together team of El Sagrado, Valiente and Metro beat the experienced Poder Mexica team (Sangre Azteca, Misterioso II and Dragón Rojo, Jr.) two falls to one.

The storyline between Pequeño Black Warrior and Bracito de Oro continued in the second match of the night, a Mini-Estrella Best two out of three falls Six-man tag team match where Bracito de Oro teamed up with Eléctrico and Astral to defeat Pequeño Warrior, Pequeño Violencia and Pierrothito when Bracito de Oro pinned Pequeño Black Warrior for the final fall. In the week following this match both Bracito de Oro and Pequeño Black Warrior visited the CMLL headquarters, presumably to discuss terms for a Lucha de Apuesta, or mask vs. mask match between the two.

The opening match saw the third-generation Casas family, Puma King and Tiger Kid take on and defeat Robin, himself a third-generation wrestler himself as part of the Alvarado Nieves family (son of Brazo Cibernético) and Bengala who uses a similar tiger inspired ring character. This was the first Super Viernes in 2010 for all four wrestlers.

No.	Results	Stipulations	Times
1	Puma King and Tiger Kid defeated Bengala and Robin	Best two out of three falls Tag team match	13:36
2	Eléctrico, Astral and Bracito de Oro defeated Pequeño Black Warrior, Pequeño Violencia and Pierrothito	Six-man tag team match	12:40
3	El Sagrado, Valiente and Metro defeated Poder Mexica (Sangre Azteca, Misterioso II and Dragón Rojo Jr.)	Six-man tag team match	13:38
4	Toscano defeated Ephesto	Lightning match (One fall, 10 minute time-limit match)	07:27
5	Taichi, El Texano Jr. and El Terrible defeated Blue Panther, Héctor Garza and Brazo de Plata	Six-man tag team match	12:36
6	La Sombra, Volador Jr. and Shocker defeated La Peste Negra (Negro Casas and El Felino) and Último Guerrero	Six-man tag team match	10:11
