= CMLL Super Viernes (February 2010) =

Mexican Professional wrestling show summary

In February 2010 Mexican professional wrestling promotion Consejo Mundial de Lucha Libre (CMLL) held four CMLL Super Viernes shows, all of which took place Arena México on Friday nights. CMLL did not hold any special events on Fridays that would force a cancellation such as a pay-per-view (PPV). Some of the matches from Super Viernes are taped for CMLL's weekly shows that air in Mexico the week following the Super Viernes show. Super Viernes often features storyline feud between two wrestlers or group of wrestlers that develop from week to week, often coming to a conclusion at a major CMLL event or in a match on Friday nights between the individuals. In total Super Viernes featured 24 matches, 6 matches per week and 71 wrestlers appeared in matches during February, including six women and seven Mini-Estrellas. CMLL only held one match featuring the women's division, two featuring the Mini-Etrellas and four Lightning matches. Místico and Volador Jr. are the only wrestlers to appear on all four Super Vierens shows.

February's Super Viernes shows began with hosting the finals of the Torneo Nacional de Parejas Increibles tournament where Atlantis and Máscara Dorada defeated Negro Casas and La Máscara to win the tournament. In the months following the tournament Mascara Dorada appeared in several Super Viernes main events, elevating him up the rankings in CMLL from previously working more towards the middle of the card. The biggest storyline throughout February was the feud between Místico and Volador Jr. that had started in January. During February Volador Jr. won the Mexican National Light Heavyweight Championship from Místico, followed by Místico challenging Volador Jr. to put his mask on the line in a Lucha de Apuesta bet match. Later on the feud was extended to also encompass a rivalry between La Sombra (Volador, Jr's tag team partner) and El Felino. The storyline between the found lasted throughout February and into March where the four faced off at the 2010 Homenaje a Dos Leyendas event on March 19. February also saw the continuation of a feud between Mini-Estrellas Pequeño Black Warrior and Bracito de Oro that saw the two face off as part of various Best two out of three falls Six-woman tag team matches featuring other Mini-Estrellas.

== February 5, 2010 ==
CMLL Super Viernes
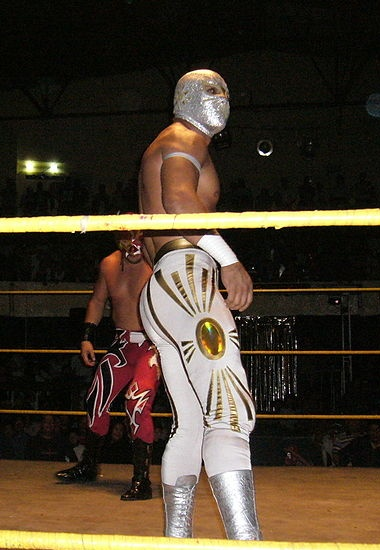
- Místico, lost in the main event
- Promotion: Consejo Mundial de Lucha Libre (CMLL)
- Date: February 5, 2010
- City: Mexico City, Mexico
- Venue: Arena México
- Attendance: 10,000+

CMLL Super Viernes chronology
← Previous; Super Viernes January 29, 2010	Next → Super Viernes February 12, 2010

Up until the February 5, 2010, Super Viernes show Místico's allegiance was undetermined, was he a Rudo (villain) or was he a Tecnico ("Fan Favorite")? During the main event the answer was that Místico was clearly a Rudo, at least in Arena México (In other arenas Místico continued to team with and get along with other CMLL tecnicos). Místico came out wearing the same outfit as the previous week, incorporating darker colors and horns on his mask and displayed the same rudo attitude as the previous week as he attacked Volador Jr. right away and began tearing at his mask. During the first fall of the match Místico ripped up Volador Jr.'s mask to such an extent that Volador Jr. accepted a replacement mask from a fan in the crowd, then that mask was ripped up as well drawing a disqualification for Místico, since intentional unmasking of an opponent is against the rules in Lucha libre. During the break between the first and second fall a replacement mask was brought out for Volador Jr. so that he could continue to wrestle. In the second fall Místico's underhanded tactics continued, he diverted the referees attention for a moment, then pulled his own mask off and threw it to Volador Jr. When the referee saw Volador Jr. holding Místico's mask he disqualified Volador Jr. mistakenly thinking that it was an intentional unmasking. In the third and deciding fall Místico tried to apply his signature move La Mística but Volador Jr. countered the move, then applied La Mística on Místico instead, forcing Místico to submit. After the match it was announced that because of his victory Volador Jr. would wrestle Místico for Místico's Mexican National Light Heavyweight Championship on the February 12 Super Viernes show.

La Máscara and Negro Casas were clearly the crowd favorites in the finals of the Pareja Incredibles Nacional tournament as they represented Mexico City in the tournament. La Máscara and Casas faced Atlantis and Máscara Dorada, representing Guadalajara, Jalisco. Unlike the preliminary rounds matches that were only one fall matches the finals featured the traditional Mexican best two out of three falls. La Máscara and Casas won the first fall when Casas pinned Atlantis after 08:07. Atlantis forced Negro Casas to submit and Máscara Dorada forced La Máscara to submit to claim the second fall after 3 minutes and 32 seconds of wrestling. The final fall went 12:30, taking the entire match to the 24:09 mark and saw Atlantis force Negro Casas to submit, followed by La Máscara being counted out as he was outside the ring for more than 20 seconds giving Atlantis and Máscara Dorada the victory and the trophy for the Parejas Incredibles Nacional tournament. The tournament was deemed a success by several magazines and websites as it managed to change up the status quo of CMLL.

The Lightning match saw El Hijo del Fantasma defeat Rey Bucanero when Bucanero intentionally unmasked Hijo del Fantasma in front of the referee. Following the match Bucanero issued a challenge to Hijo del Fantasma to defend the CMLL World Middleweight Championship against him, but nothing ever came of the challenge as Hijo del Fantasma lost the title to Negro Casas a few days later.

On February 6, 2010, Súper Luchas magazine reported that the Arena México attendance for that week's Super Viernes show was over 10,000 people, over 65% of capacity and that this was the highest crowd for a CMLL show since their 76th Anniversary Show in September. The rise in attendance was attributed to the Místico/Volador Jr. storyline and the finals of the Pareja Incredibles Nacional tournament.

No.	Results	Stipulations	Times
1	Leono and Tony Rivera defeated Durango Kid and Inquisidor	Best two out of three falls Tag team match	12:10
2	Las Zorras (Hiroka, Princesa Blanca and Princesa Sujei) defeated Estrella Magica, Lluvia and Marcela	Six-man tag team match	12:48
3	El Hijo del Fantasma defeated Rey Bucanero by disqualification	Lightning match (One fall, 10 minute time-limit match)	06:59
4	Blue Panther, Héctor Garza and Shocker defeated Los Hijos del Averno (Averno, Mephisto and El Terrible)	Six-man tag team match	19:43
5	Atlantis and Máscara Dorada defeated La Máscara and Negro Casas	Torneo Nacional de Parejas Increibles tournament final match	24:09
6	Volador Jr. defeated Místico	Best two-out-of-three falls match	20:57

== February 12, 2010 ==
CMLL Super Viernes
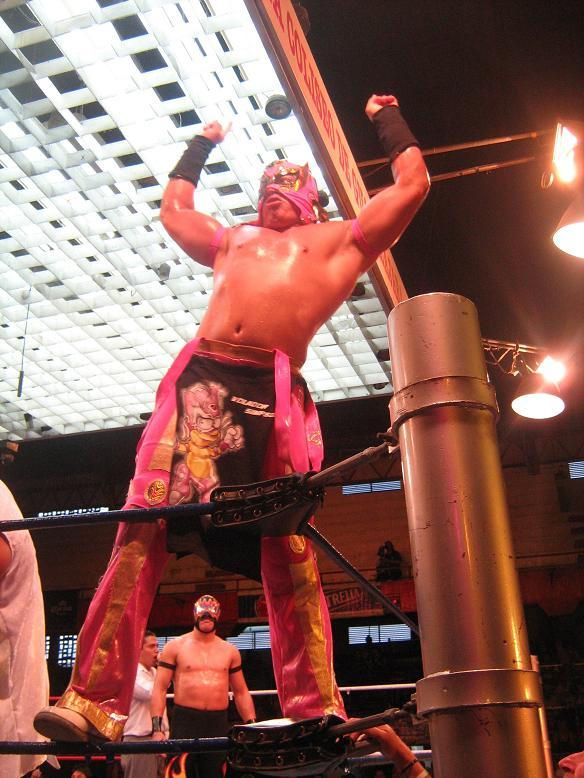
- Volador Jr. won the Mexican National Light Heavyweight Championship
- Promotion: Consejo Mundial de Lucha Libre (CMLL)
- Date: February 12, 2010
- City: Mexico City, Mexico
- Venue: Arena México

CMLL Super Viernes chronology
← Previous; Super Viernes February 5, 2010	Next → Super Viernes February 19, 2010

In the week leading up to the February 12, 2010, Super Viernes show Místico stated that he was neither Rudo (villain) nor Tecnico ("Fan Favorite") and that he was not "Anti-tecnico" in general he just hated Volador Jr., which was why he had acted the way he did during their matches. This ambiguitity in Místico's alignment was furthered by the fact that outside of Arena México Místico was still booked to team with other tecnicos without any friction between the team members, only playing the rudo when facing Volador Jr. There was no doubt that Místico was the rudo and that Volador Jr. was the crowd favorite on February 12, 2010, as the two wrestled for Místico's Mexican National Light Heavyweight Championship. Místico's fourth defense of the championship was also the highest profile as the storyline between Místico and Volador Jr. continued to intensify. Volador Jr. took the first fall with a submission hold, much to the crowd's delight, only to be pinned for the second fall after Místico tore off Volador Jr's mask and pinned him while he was trying to cover up his face. Like the previous week Volador Jr. had to be brought a new mask for the third fall, a fall that saw both wrestlers try to apply La Mistica, the move that got Volador Jr. the victory the previous week. The end came when Volador Jr. grabbed the ropes to win the third fall, the match and the championship. After the match Místico attacked Volador Jr. and tore his mask to pieces, then he attacked the referee before leaving the ring with the championship belt that now belonged to Volador Jr. In the week following the show the Mexico City Boxing and Wrestling commission threatened to suspend Místico from working in Mexico City for 2 months unless he gave the championship belt to Volador Jr.

In the semi-main event Jon Strongman returned to CMLL after a tour of Japan and teamed with Brazo de Plata and La Sombra to defeat La Peste Negra (El Felino, Mr. Niebla and Negro Casas) in two straight falls. The Lighting match of the evening saw Stuka, Jr. face and defeat the leader of Los Cancerebros del Infierno Virus. Virus' group has been trying to earn a title match at either Stuka, Jr. and Fuego's CMLL Arena Coliseo Tag Team Championship or Stuka, Jr., Máscara Dorada and Metro's Mexican National Trios Championship but did not further their case with the loss.

The undercard also featured a six-Mini-Estrellas match with CMLL World Mini-Estrellas Champion Bam Bam team up with Bracito de Oro and Fantasy against the rudo team of Pequeño Universo 2000, Pequeño Violencia and Pequeño Black Warrior. Bam Bam, Bracito and Fantasy won in two straight falls, winning the second fall by disqualification when Pequeño Black Warrior ripped Bracito de Oro's mask off to earn the disqualification.

No.	Results	Stipulations	Times
1	Delta and Guerrero Maya, Jr. defeated Disturbio and Inquisidor	Best two out of three falls Tag team match	12:50
2	Bam Bam, Bracito de Oro and Fantasy defeated Pequeño Universo 2000, Pequeño Violencia and Pequeño Black Warrior by disqualification	Six-man tag team match	12:28
3	Stuka Jr. defeated Virus	Lightning match (One fall, 10 minute time-limit match)	08:12
4	Los Guerreros de la Atlantida (Atlantis, Rey Bucanero and Último Guerrero) defeated El Hijo del Fantasma, Máximo and Valiente	Six-man tag team match	13:29
5	Brazo de Plata, Jon Strongman and La Sombra defeated La Peste Negra (El Felino, Mr. Niebla and Negro Casas)	Six-man tag team match	13:32
6	Volador Jr. defeated Místico (c)	Best two-out-of-three falls match for the Mexican National Light Heavyweight Championship	19:41
(c) / – the champion(s) heading into the match

== February 19, 2010 ==
CMLL Super Viernes
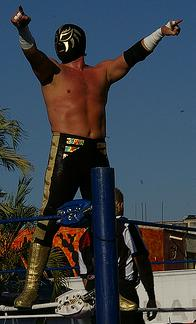
- La Sombra, won the Lighting match
- Promotion: Consejo Mundial de Lucha Libre (CMLL)
- Date: February 19, 2010
- City: Mexico City, Mexico
- Venue: Arena México

CMLL Super Viernes chronology
← Previous; Super Viernes February 12, 2010	Next → Super Viernes February 26, 2010

For the fifth week in a row the focal point of CMLL's Super Viernes show on February 19, 2010, was the storyline between Místico and Volador Jr. The previous week Volador Jr. had won the Mexican National Light Heavyweight Championship but Místico left the arena with the belt and would be suspended if he did not return it by the end of the night of the 19th.

The main event was a Best two out of three falls Six-man tag team match billed as a trios incredibles, teaming up rudos (Villains) and tecnicos (Fan Favorites) for a match. The Trios Incredibles label furthered the ambiguity about Místico's allegiance, up until the 19th he had only acted as a rudo in matches against Volador Jr. Místico teamed up with La Máscara and Negro Casas, who had previously been paired up for the Torneo Nacional de Parejas Increibles tournament. Casas came to the ring with his two CMLL championships (the CMLL World Middleweight Championship and the CMLL World Welterweight Championship) in a trashbag and seemingly got along with Místico even though Casas and his group La Peste Negra ("The Black Plague") had been feuding with Místico through most of 2009 and Casas had won the Welterweight title from Místico. On the other side Volador Jr. teamed with Último Guerrero and Héctor Garza, two wrestlers who in early January found themselves on opposite sides in three Super Viernes main events. Before the match Volador Jr.'s tag team partner La Sombra came to the ring and stole the Mexican National Light Heavyweight title belt from Místico, but was intercepted by El Felino who gave the belt back to Místico. The first two falls of the match happened in less than three minutes, splitting the falls between the teams. In the third fall both Místico and Volador Jr. used every opportunity they had to rip at each other's mask, with the fight intensifying between the two. In the end Místico ended up being disqualified as he kept attacking Volador Jr. who was trapped in the corner. After the match Scorpio, Sr., a representative of the Mexico City Boxing and Wrestling Commission, came to the ring, took the belt from Místico and handed it to the rightful champion Volador Jr. After being forced to hand over the championship Místico claimed that he did not care for the championship, he did not care that the fans booed him, he was only interested in humiliating Volador Jr. and the best way to do so was to unmask him.

The involvement of La Sombra and El Felino in the main event followed a Lighting Match between the two. On March 2, 2010, the two had faced off in a singles match on CMLL's Tuesday show. During the match Puma King, El Felino's nephew, showed up in the arena dressed like a doppelganger of El Felino, distracting both La Sombra and the referee long enough for El Felino to cheat his way to a victory. During the Lightning match the Felino doppelganger showed up once more, but this time he failed to distract the referee from El Felino's cheating tactics and in turn disqualified El Felino when he saw him pull La Sombra's mask off. Following La Sombra's appearance in the main event, El Felino evened the score, building on their rivalry.

In the semi-main event La Peste con Amour ("The Plague of Love") Máximo and Mr. Niebla teamed up with Jon Strongman to take on Ray Mendoza, Jr. and the new version of La Ola Amarilla ("the yellow wave") Naito and Taichi who was making his Arena México debut that night. Niebla and Máximo's team played up the comedic antics during the match, interacting with KeMonito, a blue furry mascot that accompanied Máximo to the ring. La Peste Con Amour lost to Mendoza, Jr. and the Japanese contingency in two falls, with all three wrestlers pinning Strongman for the second fall.

Before the third match of the evening CMLL unveiled the winners of the "Best of 2009" awards as voted on by the fans. Included in the awards was Ángel de Oro who won "Rookie of the year", Ángel de Oro teamed up with his brother Ángel de Plata and El Sagrado in the third match, losing to Poder Mexica (Dragón Rojo, Jr. and Misterioso II and Okumura two falls to one. In the second match of the night the issue between Pequeño Black Warrior and Bracito de Oro was furthered as Warrior, Pequeño Universo 2000 and Pierrothito defeated Bracito de Oro, Eléctrico and Mascarita Dorada. Pequeño Black Warrior won the third and deciding fall after a low blow to Bracito de Oro. Following the match Pequeño Black Warrior made a Luchas de Apuestas, mask vs. mask match challenge to Bracito de Oro.

No.	Results	Stipulations	Times
1	Delta and Diamante defeated Puma King and Tiger Kid	Best two out of three falls Tag team match	15:49
2	Pequeño Universo 2000, Pequeño Black Warrior and Pierrothito defeated Bracito de Oro, Eléctrico and Mascarita Dorada	Six-man tag team match	13:24
3	Poder Mexica (Dragón Rojo, Jr. and Misterioso II) and Okumura defeated El Sagrado and Los Ángeles Celestiales (Ángel de Oro and Ángel de Plata)	Six-man tag team match	14:14
4	La Sombra defeated El Felino by disqualification	Lightning match (One fall, 10 minute time-limit match)	09:21
5	Ray Mendoza Jr. and La Ola Amarilla (Taichi and Naito) defeated Jon Strongman and La Peste con Amour (Máximo and Mr. Niebla)	Six-man tag team match	14:40
6	Héctor Garza, Último Guerrero and Volador Jr. defeated Místico, La Máscara and Negro Casas	Relevos incredibles Six-man tag team match	09:33

== February 26, 2010 ==
CMLL Super Viernes
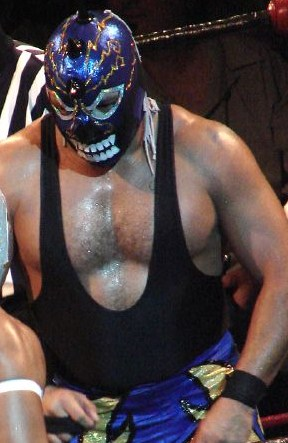
- Mephisto, won the Lighting match
- Promotion: Consejo Mundial de Lucha Libre (CMLL)
- Date: February 26, 2010
- City: Mexico City, Mexico
- Venue: Arena México

CMLL Super Viernes chronology
← Previous; Super Viernes February 19, 2010	Next → Super Viernes March 5, 2010

The February 26, 2010, Super Viernes show was the first time CMLL truly booked Místico as a Rudo (Villain) after several weeks of ambiguity. In the main event Místico teamed with rudo team La Peste Negra ("The Black Plague"), consisting of Negro Casas and El Felino to face the all Tecnico ("Fan Favorite") team of Volador Jr., La Sombra and Máscara Dorada. This was the first time Místico was booked against tecnicos other than Volador Jr. The match came about as a result of the previous week's main event and the actions surrounding it that involved five of the six competitors, except for Máscara Dorada. The first fall of the match was won when Negro Casas pinned Máscara Dorada. Less than four minutes later Dorada and La Sombra evened the sides when they pinned El Felino and Casas. The last fall featured several near falls, going over 10 minutes before the decision came. In the end La Sombra pulled Mistico's mask off and Volador Jr. rolled him up from behind for a pinfall before the referee could notice that Místico's match had been removed. Following the match both Místico and El Felino took the microphone and challenges Volador Jr. and La Sombra to put up either their masks in a Lucha de Apuesta match or at the very least the CMLL World Tag Team Championship if they were afraid to put their masks on the line in a match at the 2010 Homenaje a Dos Leyendas ("Homage to Two Legends") event on March 19, 2010. In the week following the February 26 show it was announced that the four men would wrestle in a Tag Team elimination match at Homenaje a Dos Leyendas, with the first two wrestlers eliminated having to face off in a Lucha de Apuesta match with their masks on the line.

The semi-main event saw Último Guerrero team up with El Texano, Jr. and El Terrible to revisit two of the storylines Guerrero was involved in during 2009. Facing Guerrero, Texano, Jr. and El Terrible was Ray Mendoza, Jr. who Último Guerrero had unmasked at the 2009 Homenaje a Dos Leyendas and La Ola Amarilla ("The Yellow Wave";Naito and Taichi) a group he had been feuding with during the latter half of 2009 as part of a "Mexico vs. Japan" storyline. The match saw Guerrero's team defeat Ola Amarilla and Mendoza, Jr. two falls to one when GUerrero pinned Mendoza, Jr. in the third fall.

The fourth match of the evening centered around the tecnico mascot "KeMonito" who accompanied Shocker, Toscano and La Máscara to the ring, the previous week KeMonito had accompanied Máximo to the ring but this week was on opposite sdes as Shocker's team took on La Peste con Amour (Máximo and Mr. Niebla) and Dragón Rojo, Jr. Before the match both Máximo and Mr. Niebla tried to persuade KeMonito to join their side and team up with the comedic Peste con Amour duo. Initially KeMonito refused, but when Shocker accidentally dropkicked KeMonotio during the match the blue mascot got angry and walked off turning his back on Shocker. In the end Shocker, Toscano and La Máscara won the match, two falls to one.

The lighting match featured El Hijo del Fantasma for the second time in just four weeks, taking on Mephisto. The match ended when Mephisto applied the Devil's Wings (Double underhook facebuster) for the pinfall with only 16 seconds left on the time limit. Following the match El Hijo del Fantasma had to be removed from the ring on a stretcher although he suffered no long term ill effects.

No.	Results	Stipulations	Times
1	Molotov, Guerrero Maya, Jr. and Astro Boy defeated 'Los Hombres del Camoflaje (Artillero and Súper Comando) and Semental – two falls to one	Six-man tag team match	14:59
2	Rey Cometa, Pegasso and Fuego defeated Guerreros Tuareg (Arkangel de la Muerte, Skándalo and Loco Max)	Six-man tag team match	13:10
3	Mephisto defeated El Hijo del Fantasma	Lightning match (One fall, 10 minute time-limit match)	09:44
4	Shocker, Toscano and La Máscara defeated La Peste con Amour (Mr. Niebla and Máximo) and Dragón Rojo Jr.	Six-man tag team match	20:00
5	Último Guerrero, El Texano Jr. and El Terrible defeated Ray Mendoza Jr. and La Ola Amarilla (Naito and Taichi)	Six-man tag team match	13:50
6	Volador Jr., La Sombra and Máscara Dorada defeated Místico and La Peste Negra (Negro Casas and El Felino)	Six-man tag team match	18:28
