= Trueno =

Trueno (Spanish for thunder) may refer to:

- Trueno (rapper) (born 2002)
- Trueno (wrestler), Mexican masked professional wrestler
- Toyota Sprinter Trueno, a car produced from 1972 to 2000
