= Torneo Gran Alternativa (2009) =

Mexican professional wrestling tournament

- Promotion: Consejo Mundial de Lucha Libre (CMLL)
- Date: September 26, 2009
- City: Mexico City, Mexico
- Venue: Arena Mexico

Event chronology
← Previous; CMLL 76th Anniversary Show	Next → Reyes del Aire

Torneo Gran Alternativa chronology
← Previous; 2008	Next → 2010

The Torneo Gran Alternativa (2009) was a professional wrestling major show event produced by Consejo Mundial de Lucha Libre (CMLL) that took place on September 26, 2009 in Arena Mexico, Mexico City, Mexico. The show featured the 2009 version of CMLL's Torneo Gran Alternativa (Spanish for "the Great Alternative tournament), a tournament where an established CMLL star teams with a Novato or rookie in a tag team tournament. None of the Novatos in the 2009 tournament had participated in previous Gran Alternativas. The teams were Místico and Ángel de Oro, Blue Panther and Rey Cometa, Héctor Garza and Ángel de Plata, Atlantis and Camorra, Mr. Niebla and Tiger Kid, Averno and Pólvora, Toscano and Rouge and finally Yujiro and Shigeo Okumura. Shocker was originally scheduled to team with Rouge and Semental was supposed to team with Yujiro but both were replaced before the show. In addition to the seven match tournament the card featured two title matches; Último Guerrero defending the CMLL World Heavyweight Championship against Jushin Thunder Liger in the main event and Pierrothito defending the Mexican National Lightweight Championship against Eléctrico on the under card. THe show featured two additional Six-man tag team matches.

== Background ==
The event featured eleven professional wrestling matches with different wrestlers involved in pre-existing scripted feuds or storylines. Wrestlers portray either villains (referred to as Rudos in Mexico) or fan favorites (Técnicos in Mexico) as they compete in wrestling matches with pre-determined outcomes.

== Results ==
No.	Results	Stipulations
1	Stuka, Flash and Metro defeated Los Guerreros Tuareg (Arkangel de la Muerte, Skándalo and Loco Max)	Six-man "Lucha Libre rules" tag team match
2	Pierrothito (c) defeated Eléctrico	Singles match for the Mexican National Lightweight Championship
3	Los Hijos del Averno (Mephisto, Ephesto and El Texano Jr. defeated Volador Jr., La Máscara and Toscano	Six-man "Lucha Libre rules" tag team match
4	Héctor Garza and Ángel de Plata defeated Averno and Pólvora	Gran Alternativa first round match
5	Yujiro and Okumura defeated Toscano and Rouge	Gran Alternativa first round match
6	Místico and Ángel de Oro defeated Atlantis and Camorra	Gran Alternativa first round match
7	Mr. Niebla and Tiger Kid defeated Blue Panther and Rey Cometa	Gran Alternativa first round match
8	Yujiro and Okumura defeated Héctor Garza and Ángel de Plata	Gran Alternativa semi-final match
9	Místico and Ángel de Oro defeated Mr. Niebla and Tiger Kid	Gran Alternativa semi-final match
10	Yujiro and Okumura defeated Místico and Ángel de Oro	Gran Alternativa final
11	Último Guerrero (c) defeated Jushin Thunder Liger	Singles match for the CMLL World Heavyweight Championship
(c) / – the champion(s) heading into the match
