= Los Cancerberos del Infierno =

Professional wrestling stable

- The logo of Los Cancerberos

Stable
- Members: Virus (leader); Cancerbero
- Former members: Demus 3:16; Euforia; Pólvora; Raziel (deceased); Luciferno
- Debut: November 19, 2009

Los Cancerberos del Infierno (Spanish for "The Infernal Cerberusses" or "Infernal Hellhounds") is a villainous Mexican professional wrestling stable, currently working for Consejo Mundial de Lucha Libre (CMLL), where it spun off from Los Infernales. The group works as a rudo (term used for wrestlers who portray the "Bad guys") faction and used much flame and burning imagery in their wrestling apparel. As of April 2022, the stable only consists of Virus and Cancerbero. Pólvora, Euforia and Demus 3:16 were formerly members of the stable but have since left. Founding member Raziel would remain a part of the stable until his death.

== History ==
A Consejo Mundial de Lucha Libre (CMLL) press conference on November 19, 2009 was used to officially announce that Virus was the leader of a new CMLL group called Los Cancerberos del Infierno (Spanish for "the Infernal Cerberusses") a group that beyond Virus consisted of Euforia and Pólvora as well as two new characters Cancerbero and Raziel. Cancerbero and Raziel used to wrestle under the ring names Messala and Caligula, otherwise known as Los Romanos a low-card rudo tag team. On the January 15, 2010 Super Viernes Raziel defeated Ángel de Plata in a Lighting match, continuing the building storyline between the two factions. In late 2009 Los Cancerberos participated in a tournament to crown new Mexican National Trios Champion, Virus, Pólvora and Euforia represented the group and defeated Los Ángeles Celestiales (Ángel Azteca Jr., Ángel de Plata and Ángel de Oro) in the first round. Following the tournament loss Los Ángeles Celestiales and Los Cancerberos del Infierno have developed a rivalry between the two groups, facing off on various CMLL shows, including their Friday night CMLL Super Viernes show. In early 2010 Euforia was entered in the first ever Torneo Nacional de Parejas Increibles tournament, a tournament where CMLL normally teams up a Tecnico and a Rudo for a tournament where the teams represent the region they trained in. Euforia teamed up with Ephesto to form the only "all rudo" team in the group. In the first round Euforia and Ephesto lost to tournament favorites Místico and Averno.

In late 2010 Mini-Estrella Demus 3:16 won a tournament to earn the right to work in the regular male division instead. Once promoted Demus 3:16 joined Los Cancereros and almost immediately started to develop friction with Virus, as Demus 3:16 tried to take over as the leader of the group. The storyline came to a conclusion on March 11, 2011, when Virus defeated Demus 3:16 in a Hair vs. Hair match, which let Virus keep his position as the leader of Los Cancerberos del Infierno and send Demus back into the Mini-Estrellas division. On June 7, 2011, Virus defeated Guerrero Maya Jr. in a tournament final to win the vacant CMLL World Lightweight Championship. On July 15, 2011, Pólvora defeated Valiente to win the Mexican National Welterweight Championship. In April 2012, Euforia and CMLL World Heavyweight Champion El Terrible won the 2012 Gran Alternativa. The same month both Euforia and Pólvora entered the En Busca de un Ídolo tournament/reality television show, while Pólvora did not qualify for the second round, finishing last in the point standings, Euforia made it to the finals before losing to Titán. On July 6, Euforia was named the newest member of Último Guerrero's Los Guerreros del Infierno stable, leaving Los Cancerberos. No storyline came of the move from one group to the other. Pólvora lost the Middlweight Championship to En Busca de un Ídolo tournament winner Titán on September 4, 2012. In late 2012, Pólvora left the stable to team up with Rey Escorpión and Dragón Rojo Jr., forming a new trio (later named Los Revolucionarios del Terror) to face Los Guerreros del Infierno, Último Guerrero, Niebla Roja and former Cancerbero teammate Euforia.

== Championships and accomplishments ==
Championships won while members of Los Cancerberos del Infierno are listed.

- Consejo Mundial de Lucha Libre

- CMLL World Lightweight Championship (1 time) – Virus
- CMLL Torneo Gran Alternativa: 2010 (Pólvora and Héctor Garza), 2012 (Euforia and El Terrible)
- Mexican National Trios Championship (1 time) – Virus, Cancerbero and Raziel
- Mexican National Welterweight Championship (1 time) – Pólvora

== Luchas de Apuestas record ==
Winner (wager)	Loser (wager)	Location	Event	Date	Notes
Virus (hair, leadership)	Demus 3:16 (hair, division) (Note: With his loss, Demus 3:16 would return to the Mini-Estrellas division)	Mexico City	CMLL show	March 11, 2011	
Virus (hair)	Loco Max (hair)	Puebla, Puebla	CMLL show	March 12, 2012	
