= Trueno (wrestler) =

Mexican professional wrestler

Personal information
- Born: May 10, 1979 (age 47) Monterrey, Nuevo Leon, Mexico

Professional wrestling career
- Billed height: 1.72 m (5 ft 7 1/2 in)
- Billed weight: 80 kg (180 lb)
- Trained by: Trueno (Senior); El Satánico; Franco Colombo
- Debut: December 20, 1998

Trueno (born May 10, 1979 in Monterrey, Nuevo Leon, Mexico) is a Mexican professional wrestler currently working for the Mexican professional wrestling promotion Consejo Mundial de Lucha Libre (CMLL) portraying a tecnico ("good guy") wrestling character. Trueno's real name is not a matter of public record, as is often the case with masked wrestlers in Mexico where their private lives are kept a secret from the professional wrestling fans. Trueno is the son of the original Trueno, and has previously worked under the ring name Trueno, Jr. as well as Mr. Trueno (not to be mistaken for the current Mr. Trueno). He is the brother of CMLL wrestler Delta. Trueno is Spanish for "Thunder", which is reflected in lightning bolts both on his mask and tights.

== Professional wrestling career ==
The wrestler known as Trueno is the son of the original wrestler to use the ring name Trueno (Spanish for "Thunder"). He has a younger brother who is also a professional wrestler, who originally worked under the name "Hijo del Trueno" ("Son of Trueno") but now works for Consejo Mundial de Lucha Libre (CMLL) under the name Delta. Trueno originally worked on the independent circuit, especially around his native state of Nuevo Leon as Trueno, Jr.

=== Consejo Mundial de Lucha Libre (2005–present) ===
Trueno joined CMLL in 2005, dropping the "Junior" from his name and working simply as "Trueno", a tecnico (wrestlers who portray the "good guys", also referred to as "Face") worker, normally wrestling in the first, second or third match of the night. Trueno was one of over third competitors in International Wrestling Revolution Group's (IWRG) 2007 Rey del Ring ("King of the Ring") tournament, but did not win it. He participated in the 2007 version of CMLL's Reyes del Aire from Arena Coliseo. The tournament was a twelve-man torneo cibernetico, multi-man elimination match won by Virus. In October, 2012 Trueno and Astro Boy teamed up to participate in a tournament where the winning team would receive a match against the reigning CMLL Arena Coliseo Tag Team Champions Stuka, Jr. and Fuego. The team lost to Loco Max and Virus in the opening round. The tournament was won by Diamante and Trueno's younger brother Delta who at this point was already ranked higher on the card than Trueno. On April 24, 2011 Trueno was one of 16 wrestlers competing for the vacant CMLL World Super Lightweight Championship. Trueno, alongside Hijo del Signo, Hombre Bala Jr., Inquisidor, Magnus, Palacio Negro and Rey Cometa were eliminated in the preliminary round when Guerrero Maya, Jr. earned his spot in the finals. Trueno had an accidental fall during a match in 2011 and suffered a severe head injury, an injury that kept him from competing on a regular basis since then.

== Championships and accomplishments ==
- Comisión de Box y Lucha Libre Nuevo Laredo

- Nuevo Laredo State Welterweight Championship (1 time)
