= Bracito de Oro =

Mexican professional wrestler (1965–2025)

Personal information
- Born: Roberto Rodrgiuez Aguirrre; April 13, 1965 Oaxaca, Oaxaca, Mexico
- Died: March 9, 2025 (aged 59) Ciudad de México, México

Professional wrestling career
- Ring name(s): Bracito de Oro; Guerrerito Maya; Sultán Gargolita; Águilita Real
- Billed height: 1.50 m (4 ft 11 in)
- Billed weight: 75 kg (165 lb)
- Trained by: Shadito Cruz; El As
- Debut: August 19, 1991

Roberto Rodríguez Aguirre (April 13, 1965 – March 9, 2025) was a Mexican professional wrestler. He was best known for appearing for Consejo Mundial de Lucha Libre (CMLL) in their Mini-Estrella division under the name Bracito de Oro (Spanish for "Little Golden Arm"). Aguirre's real name was not a matter of public record until he was unmasked by Pequeño Black Warrior on April 30, 2010. This is often the case with masked wrestlers in Mexico where their private lives are kept a secret from the wrestling fans and they are only forced to reveal their real name when unmasked. Working in the Mini division does not necessarily mean that Bracito de Oro had dwarfism as several short wrestlers work in the "Mini" division, which is what separates the Mexican Mini-Estrella from traditional Midget wrestling as practiced in the United States and other places. Bracito de Oro was a smaller version of professional wrestler Brazo de Oro. He died on March 9, 2025, at the age of 59.

== Professional wrestling career ==
Roberto Rodriguez Aguirre was originally trained by El As and Shadito Cruz before making his professional wrestling debut in late 1991. He began working in the very popular CMLL Mini-Estrella division almost immediately and was given the masked character "Sultan Gargolita", a mini version of the CMLL rudo (villainous) wrestler Sultan Gargola. in 1993 his character was changed when Sultan Gargola was no longer used, instead he became Guerrerito Maya, after rudo Guerrero Maya. His stint at Guerrerito Maya only lasted about a year before it was dropped. In 1994 he became Bracito de Oro, patterned on the popular tecnico (heroic character) Brazo de Oro, son of Shadito Cruz. While a lot of Mini-Estrellas had left CMLL for Asistencia Asesoría y Administración (AAA) Bracito de Oro has remained with the company ever since. Bracito de Oro often teamed with Bracito de Plata or Bracito de Platino, miniature versions of Brazo de Plata and Brazo de Platino, forming a combo whose strength lay in comedy. Over the years Bracito de Oro has won several Lucha de Apuesta, or bet matches. He has unmasked Coquito Blanco and La Llorna in singles competition. Teaming with Bracito de Plata they have unmasked a team of mini-clowns called Los Payasitos. On August 28, 2002, Bracito de Oro teamed with Bracito de Platino to defeat Los Mini Skeletors in a Lucha de Apuesta match after which Los Mini Skeletors were unmasked per Lucha Libre traditions.

In February 2010 a storyline feud started to develop between Bracito de Oro and Pequeño Black Warrior that started with Pequeño Black Warrior attacking Bracito de Oro after being pinned by him, ripping his mask. The two faced off several times after that, mainly on opposite sides of six-man tag team matches that saw Pequeño Black Warrior target Bracito de Oro's mask, at times the mask ripping even lead to his team being disqualified for the blatant disregard of the rules. After a match on Friday Night Pequeño Black Warrior challenged Bracito de Oro to a Lucha de Apuesta match. After the feud had been building lasted for over three months Pequeño Black Warrior defeated Bracito de Oro in a Lucha de Apuestas match as part of the April 30, 2010 Super Viernes show. Following the match Bracito de Oro unmasked and revealed his real name to the audience. His final appearance in CMLL saw him lose a Lucha de Apuestas, hair vs. hair match to Shockercito later that year.

== Championships and accomplishments ==
- Regional Mexican promotions
  - Oaxaca Lightweight Championship (1 time)

== Luchas de Apuestas record ==
Winner (wager)	Loser (wager)	Location	Event	Date	Notes
Bracito de Oro (mask)	Coquito Blanco (mask)	Acapulco, Guerrero	Live event	N/A	
Bracito de Oro (mask)	La Llorona (mask)	N/A	Live event	N/A	
Los Bracitos (masks) (Bracito de Oro and Bracito de Plata)	Los Payasitos (mask)	N/A	Live event	N/A	
Los Bracitos (masks) (Bracito de Oro and Bracito de Platino)	Los Mini Skeletors (masks)	Xochimilco, Mexico City	Live event	August 24, 2002	
Pequeño Black Warrior (mask)	Bracito de Oro (mask)	Mexico City	Super Viernes	April 3, 2010	
