= Ángel Azteca Jr. =

Mexican professional wrestler

Angel Azteca Jr.
Personal information
- Born: June 1, 1980 (age 46) Torreón, Coahuila, Mexico

Professional wrestling career
- Ring name(s): Cobrita Oriental; Fantastico II; Angel Azteca Jr.
- Billed height: 1.71 m (5 ft 7 1/2 in)
- Billed weight: 85 kg (187 lb)
- Trained by: Ángel Azteca; El Ìndio Chiricagua; El Satánico
- Debut: 1995

Ángel Azteca Jr. (born June 1, 1980) is a Mexican professional wrestler, best known for working for the Mexican professional wrestling promotion Consejo Mundial de Lucha Libre (CMLL). He is not the actual son of professional wrestler Ángel Azteca, but got permission to use the name by the original before he died in 2007, Ángel Azteca Jr. is the son of Viente Negro. Angel Azteca Jr.'s real name is not a matter of public record, as is often the case with masked wrestlers in Mexico where their private lives are kept a secret from the wrestling fans. Ángel Azteca Jr. forms a trio called Los Ángeles Celestiales ("The Celestial Angels") along with Ángel de Oro and Ángel de Plata. Ángel Azteca Jr. is Spanish for "Aztec Angel Jr."

== Professional wrestling career ==
The wrestler who today is known as Ángel Azteca Jr. made his professional wrestling debut in 1995, at the age of just 15. Early on he wrestled under the ring name Cobrita Oriental ("Little Asian Cobra"). Later on he would adopt the ring name Fantastico II, teaming with Fantastico I to form Los Fantasticos. It has not been confirmed that Fantastico I was his brother, but later on the two did team together. In 2005/2006 he adopted the name Ángel Azteca Jr. and his brother began wrestling as Ángel Azteca II, both having paid the original Ángel Azteca for the rights to use the name. The original Ángel Azteca even returned to the ring to help jumpstart the careers of Ángel Azteca Jr. and Ángel Azteca II. The original Ángel Azteca died in early 2007, after which Ángel Azteca II changed his ring name to Imperio Azteca while Ángel Azteca Jr. kept his name as an homage to his mentor. Since the death of Ángel Azteca promoters have been very careful not to bill Ángel Azteca Jr. as the actual son of the original and more of his successor.

By mid-2007 Ángel Azteca Jr. wrestled full-time for Consejo Mundial de Lucha Libre as a low-card Tecnico (fan favorite). On October 2, 2007 he participated in the 2007 Reyes del Aire ("Kings of the Air") Torneo cibernetico but lost to eventual winner Virus.

In June 2008 Ángel Azteca Jr. teamed up with Mascara Purpura to participate in a tournament for the vacant CMLL Arena Coliseo Tag Team Championship. The makeshift team defeated Los Romanos (Caligula and Messala) in the first round and Los Guerreros Tuareg (Arkangel de la Muerte and Hooligan) in the second round. In the third round the team lost to Los Infernales (Nosteratu and Euforia). On June 27, 2008 Ángel Azteca Jr. competed for the Trofeo Generacion del 75 (Generation of 75 Trophy), a tournament for young wrestlers who had joined CMLL during their 75th year of operation. El Hijo del Fantasma won the match but Ángel Azteca Jr. was able to make a good showing for himself.

On July 18, 2008 Ángel Azteca Jr. took part in CMLL's annual Gran Alternativa tournament, a tournament where an experienced wrestler teams up with a newcomer. Ángel Azteca Jr. teamed up with Shocker but lost in the first round to tournament winners Último Guerrero and Dragón Rojo Jr. By the end of 2008 Ángel Azteca Jr. had begun to team with the brother duo of Ángel de Plata and Ángel de Oro to form a low-card trio called Los Ángeles Celestiales ("The Celestial Angels"). On April 7, 2009 Ángel Azteca Jr. participated in a 10-man Torneo cibernetico elimination match for the vacant CMLL World Super Lightweight Championship. The other participants included Rey Cometa, Pegasso, Tiger Kid, Pólvora, Inquisidor, Súper Comando, Angel de Oro, Ángel de Plata and eventual winner Máscara Dorada. In late 2009 Los Ángeles Celestiales participated in a tournament to crown new Mexican National Trios Champion. The team lost in the first round to Los Cancerberos del Infierno Virus, Pólvora and Euforia.

Talks of a serious feud against Arkangel de la Muerte arose in early 2010, playing off the fact that Arkangel de la Muerte was the wrestler that unmasked the original Ángel Azteca and that Junior wanted revenge for that deed. No Lucha de Apuesta, mask vs. mask match, has been announced yet as the storyline between the two is in its very early stages. Ángel Azteca Jr. was one of 12 men who put their mask on the line as part of a 12-man steel cage match in the main event of the 2010 Infierno en el Ring. He worked together with his fellow Ángeles Celestiales throughout the match and managed to escape as the sixth man out of the cage. In the end, Ángel de Oro defeated Fabián el Gitano in the Lucha de Apueta portion of the match to unmask him.
