= Los Hijos del Infierno =

Professional wrestling stable

Los Hijos del Averno
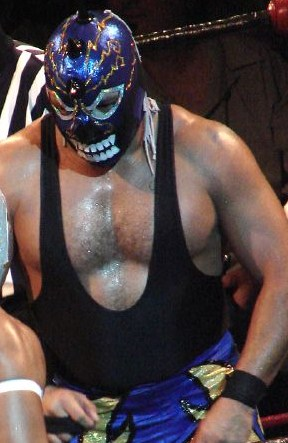
- Hijos del Infierno member Mephisto

Stable
- Members: Mephisto; Ephesto; Averno; El Terrible; El Texano Jr. Luciferno
- Name(s): La Triada del Terror; Jauria del Terror; Los Hijos del Averno; Los Hijos del Infierno
- Debut: 2006
- Disbanded: 2021

Los Hijos del Averno (Spanish for "The Sons of Hell") was the most well known name of a Mexican professional wrestling group, called a stable in the Mexican promotion Consejo Mundial de Lucha Libre (CMLL). The group was originally formed in 2006 under the name La Triadad del Terror ("The Triad of Terror") and has also been briefly known as Los Jauria del Terror ("the Hounds of Terror"). In 2015 the group was renamed Los Hijos del Infierno ("The Sons of the Inferno") and last consisted of Mephisto, Ephesto and Luciferno, working as a rudo (term used for wrestlers who portray the "Bad guys") faction. The group was led by Averno, whom the group was named after, until Averno left CMLL in 2014.

== Los Nuevo Infernales ==
The characters of Averno and Mephisto were originally created to team up with El Satánico to form the team Los Nuevo Infernales ("The New Infernals") in 1999, discarding their previous ring identities of Rencor Latino and Astro Rey, Jr. respectively. On Junu 23, 2002 Satánico, Averno and Mephisto defeated the trio of Mr. Niebla, Olímpico and Safari to win the Mexican National Trios Championship. Los Infernales would only hold the Trios title for approximately 3 months before losing it to La Familia de Tijuana (Damián 666, Halloween and Nicho el Millonario). The loss led to a storyline where Averno and Mephisto would split off from Satánico, with Mephisto beating his "creator" for the CMLL World Welterweight Championship to signify the total disintegration of the group.

== La Triada del Terror (2006–2008) ==
In 2006 Averno and Mephisto joined up with Ephesto, a new ring character for the former Safari, and together the three formed a group known as La Triada del Terror ("The Triad of Terror"). Averno and Mephisto would hold the CMLL World Tag Team Championship a total of three times while working under the Triadad del Terror moniker. La Triada would be involved in an extensive feud with CMLL's top tecnico ("good guy") Místico both in individual and team competition. The group was briefly known as Los Ku Klux Klan, complete with robes and hoods (albeit black instead of white), but the name was only used for a few shows.

== Los Perros del Mal (2008) ==
The group Los Perros del Mal ("The Bad Dogs") had formed in 2004 and over the years La Triada del Terror had formed a loose alliance with the group, but in February 2008 after Averno and Mephisto won their third CMLL World Tag Team Championship the two of them became official members, abandoning the La Triadad name altogether. Ephesto would join up with Último Guerrero's Los Laguneros group, but ended up turning on the group later on and while he reunited with Averno and Mephisto he was never officially a member of Los Perros del Mal. In October 2008 Los Perros del Mal leader Perro Aguayo, Jr., along with a number of members of his group left CMLL to form their own Perros del Mal promotion.

== Los Hijos del Averno (2008–2015) ==
When Los Perros del Mal left the promotion Averno, Mephisto, Ephesto and the remaining Perros del Mal members El Terrible and El Texano, Jr. formed a new group. The group was initially called Los Jauria del Terror ("the Hounds of Terror") but then settled on Los Hijos del Averno ("The Sons of Hell"). In February 2009 CMLL held a press conference where it was announced that Misterioso, Jr. was joining the group, only for him to leave the group to become the third member of Poder Mexica instead. During Averno's feud with La Mascara Los Hijos used low ranked Inquisidor to trick La Mascara as he wore Averno's mask for a couple of appearances, but never officially included Inquisidor in the group. In April 2011 El Terrible and El Texano, Jr. split from Los Hijos del Averno to form a new faction with Rey Bucanero called La Fuerza TRT ("The TRT Power"). On April 28, 2014, CMLL announced Averno's departure from the promotion.

== Los Hijos del Infierno (2015–2021) ==
Mephisto and Ephesto continued to be billed as "Los Hijos del Averno" after Averno left CMLL but were in search of a third member to complete the trio. At first they teamed up with Hechicero for a number of matches, but later introduced El Hombre Sin Nombre ("The Man with No Name") as a potential member. El Hombre worked with Mephisto and Ephesto for a number of months before he was finally given a ring name, introducing him as Luciferno with a mask and ring gear resembling a devil. After the introduction the trio was renamed Los Hijos del Infierno ("The Sons of the Infierno")

in mid-2021, Ephesto reverted to his original name of Panterita del Ring in order to introduce his son (the future Mascara Dorada II). Luciferno & Mephisto teamed for the last time as Los Hijos del Infierno on September 9, a week before the CMLL 88th Anniversary Show. At said show, El Satanico reformed Los Infernale with Mephisto as one of the members, essentially ending this spin-off. Luciferno joined Los Cancerberos del Infierno the following year.

== Championships and accomplishments ==
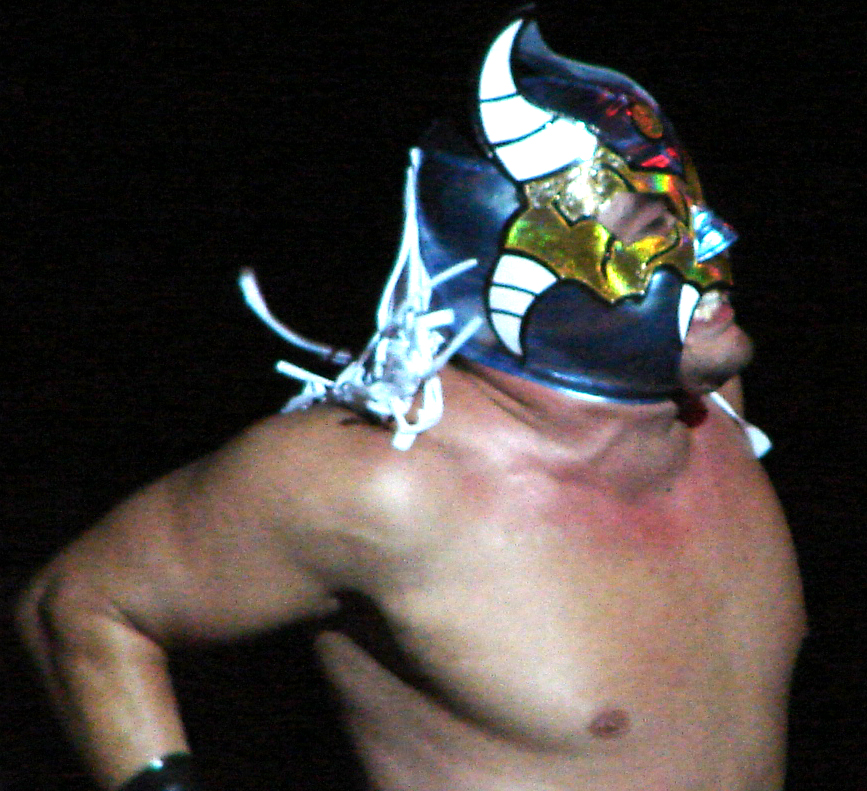
Averno, the former leader of the group (taken before he was unmasked in 2011)

Only championships won while members of Los Hijos del Averno/Infierno are listed.

- Consejo Mundial de Lucha Libre
  - CMLL World Light Heavyweight Championship (1 time) – Ephesto
  - CMLL World Middleweight Championship (1 time) – Averno
  - CMLL World Tag Team Championship (3 times) – Averno and Mephisto
  - CMLL World Trios Championship (1 time) – Averno, Mephisto and Ephesto
  - CMLL World Welterweight Championship (1 time) – Mephisto
  - Mexican National Light Heavyweight Championship (1 time) – Mephisto
  - Mexican National Trios Championship (1 time) – Mephisto, Ephesto and Luciferno
  - NWA World Historic Light Heavyweight Championship (1 time) – El Texano, Jr.
  - NWA World Historic Middleweight Championship (1 time) – Averno
  - NWA World Light Heavyweight Championship (1 time) – El Texano, Jr. (Note: Up until the late 1980s CMLL was a member of the National Wrestling Alliance and retained the NWA Light Heavyweight Championship title after leaving the NWA. It is not officially recognized as an NWA Championship.)
  - NWA World Middleweight Championship (1 time) – Averno (Note: CMLL has not been a member of the National Wrestling Alliance since the late 1980s but continued to promote several NWA "Branded" titles until 2010.)
  - Occidente Tag Team Championship (1 time) – El Terrible and El Texano, Jr.
  - Leyenda de Azul: 2008 – El Terrible
- Total Nonstop Action Wrestling
  - TNA World X Cup (2008) – Averno, with Rey Bucanero, Último Guerrero and Volador Jr.

== Luchas de Apuestas record ==
Only Luchas de Apuestas matches worked while members of Los Hijos del Averno/Infierno are listed.

| Winner (wager) | Loser (wager) | Location | Event | Date | Notes |
|---|---|---|---|---|---|
| El Texano, Jr. (hair) | Máximo (hair) | Guadalajara, Jalisco | Live event | March 8, 2009 | |
| Averno (mask) | Plata (mask) | Lagos de Moreno, Jalisco | Live event | August 9, 2009 | |
| El Texano, Jr. and El Terrible (hair) | No Limit (hair) (Yujiro and Naito) | Mexico City | Sin Salida | December 4, 2009 | |
| La Máscara (mask) | Averno (mask) | Mexico City | Juicio Final | June 17, 2011 | |
| El Texano, Jr. and El Terrible (hair) | La Dinastia Alvarado (hair) (Brazo de Plata and Máximo) | Mexico City | Homenaje a Dos Leyendas | March 18, 2011 | |
| Averno (hair) | Blue Panther (hair) | Mexico City | CMLL 80th Anniversary Show | September 13, 2013 | |
