= Inquisidor =

Mexican professional wrestler

Personal information
- Born: Juan Miguel Escalante Grande; March 24, 1977 (age 49) Guadalajara, Jalisco, Mexico

Professional wrestling career
- Ring name(s): Vaquerito; Vaquero; Inquisidor
- Billed height: 1.82 m (5 ft 11 1/2 in)
- Billed weight: 75 kg (165 lb)
- Trained by: Tony Salazar; Franco Colombo
- Debut: 1995; July 8, 2008 (As Inquisidor)

Inquisidor (Spanish for Inquisitor) is the current ring name of Juan Miguel Escalante Grande (born March 24, 1977, in Guadalajara, Jalisco, Mexico) who is a Mexican professional wrestler currently working for the Mexican promotion Consejo Mundial de Lucha Libre (CMLL) portraying a rudo ("Bad guy") wrestling character. Unlike most masked professional wrestlers Inquisidor's birthname is a matter of public record, often masked wrestlers in Mexico keep their private lives secret from the wrestling fans, but Inquisidor used to wrestle unmasked under the ring names Vaquerito ("Little Cowboy") and Vaquero ("Cowboy").

== Personal life ==
Juan Escalante is the brother of a professional wrestler who works under the ring name Pólvora, the cousin of wrestlers Mictlán, Súper Nova, Texano Jr. and the nephew of El Texano.

== Professional wrestling career ==
Escalante started out wrestling in the Mini-Estrella division, which in Mexico is more than just Midget wrestling exclusively for little people, but also includes a number of wrestlers who just happen to be short compared to the average. He competed under the ring name Vaquerito ("Little Cowboy") and worked primarily on the Mexican independent circuit. Around 2000 he began appearing for Consejo Mundial de Lucha Libre (CMLL) as well, working a storyline feud with Mascarita Mágica ("Little Magic Mask") that lead to the two men meeting in consecutive Luchas de Apuesta ("bet matches") where both competitors put their hair on the line, Vaquerito won the first match and has Mascarita Mágica shaved bald after the match, but lost the rematch some months later and had to be shaved bald himself.

=== Vaquero (2000–2008) ===
In 2000 Escalante's brother made his professional wrestling debut, working under the name Polvóra ("Gunpowder"), which lead Vaquerito to leave the Mini-Estrellas division and work as simply "Vaquero" ("Cowboy"). The brothers mainly worked as a tag team on the Mexican independent circuito Vaquero also helped train his cousin (later known as Super Nova) for his professional wrestling career around 2002. By 2005 both Pólvora and Vaquero began working for Consejo Mundial de Lucha Libre (CMLL), mainly on the promotions minor shows or in the opening match of their big shows from Arena México. In early 2008 Vaquero got involved in a storyline against Metal Blanco, that escalated until the two met in a Luchas de Apuesta match where Vaquero risked his hair and Metal Blanco risked his mask. The match took place on April 5, 2008, and saw Vaquero lose both the match and his hair. On June 22, 2008, Pólvora and Vaquero participated in a tournament for the vacant CMLL Arena Coliseo Tag Team Championship, but lost in the opening round to Mictlán and Fabian el Gitano. The two brothers teamed up with mixed success from 2005 until mid-2008.

=== Inquisidor (2008–present) ===
The loss of the Apuesta match was not an indicator that CMLL had no plans for Escalante going forward; on the contrary they decided to give him a new ring image, making him into an enmascarado called "Inquisidor". He made his in-ring debut on July 8, 2008, unveiling his new look that included a mask that covered his entire face except for his eyes with a design that was mainly black but with a stylized red axe on the front of it. Neither CMLL nor Inquisidor nor his brother Pólvora admitted the true identity of Inquisidor, with the brothers claiming that Inquisidor was a younger brother and that Vaquero had been forced to retire due to injuries. He competed in CMLL's 2008 Bodybuilding contest and won the "Beginners" group. On April 7, 2009, Inquisidor participated in a 10-man Torneo cibernetico for the vacant CMLL World Super Lightweight Championship. The other participants included Pólvora, Rey Cometa, Pegasso, Tiger Kid, Ángel Azteca, Jr., Súper Comando, Ángel de Oro, Ángel de Plata and eventual winner Máscara Dorada. On November 25, 2009, Inquisidor repeated his performance from the 2008 CMLL Bodybuilding tournament as he once again won the "Beginners" tournament. The fact that CMLL never openly admitted that Inquisidor was the former Vaquero led to him being classified as a "rookie" and was entered in the 2010 torneo Gran Alternativa, where a rookie and a "veteran" wrestler teamed up for a tag team tournament. Inquisidor teamed with veteran Atlantis for the tournament; together they defeated El Terrible and Disturbio in the first round, but lost to Diamante and La Sombra in the second round. On July 18, 2010, Inquisidor made his first appearance on a major CMLL show as he teamed up with Cholo in the opening match of the 2012 Infierno en el Ring show, only to lose to the team of Tigre Blanco and Metatron two falls to one. On February 27, 2011, Inquisidor unsuccessfully challenged Metal Blanco for the Occidente Welterweight Championship. Since his feud and Apuesta match with Metal Blanco came before he adopted the Inquisidor character no official mention of their history was made. During Averno's storyline feud with La Mascara Inquisidor was used in a ploy by Averno to trick La Mascara, by having Inquisidor dress up as Averno to distract La Mascara. Helping Averno did not mean that Inquisidor was invited to join Averno's group Los Hijos del Averno ("The Sons of Hell") While Inquisidor's history prior to 2008 was not officially recognized, CMLL used him as one of the "veteran" rudos in their 2011 storyline with Generacion 2011, who joined the company in 2011. Inquisidor, Los Rayos Tapatío and a number of other low or mid-card Rudos such as Apocalipsis fought Generacion 2011, Dragon Lee, Magnus, Hombre Bala Jr. and Super Halcón Jr. In March 2013 Inquisidor was one of 18 wrestlers who competed in the second annual Torneo Sangre Nueva. He competed in qualifying block B on March 5, 2013, for a place in the finals, the other wrestlers in Block B included Genesis, Robin, Sensei, Oro, Jr., Disturbio, Guerrero Negro, Jr., Super Halcón Jr., Taurus and Zayco who competed in a torneo cibernetico, multi-man elimination match. He was eliminated as the second wrestler over all when he was pinned by Sensei.

== Championships and accomplishments ==
- Consejo Mundial de Lucha Libre

- CMLL Bodybuilding Tournament: Winner Beginners 2008, 2009

== Luchas de Apuestas record ==
Winner (wager)	Loser (wager)	Location	Event	Date	Notes
Vaquerito (hair)	Pequeño Blondie (hair)	N/A	Live event	N/A	
Vaquerito (hair)	Mascarita Mágica (hair)	N/A	Live event	N/A	
Mascarita Mágica (hair)	Vaquerito (hair)	Mexico City	CMLL show	March 5, 2000	
Vaquero (hair)	Lince (hair)	Querétaro, Mexico	Live event	August 20, 2006	
Metal Blanco (mask)	Vaquero (hair)	Guadalajara, Jalisco	CMLL show	April 5, 2008	
