= Pólvora =

Mexican professional wrestler

Personal information
- Born: July 19, 1979 (age 47) Mexico City, Mexico

Professional wrestling career
- Ring name: Pólvora
- Billed height: 1.72 m (5 ft 7 1/2 in)
- Billed weight: 85 kg (187 lb)
- Trained by: Franco Columbo; Shocker; Tony Salazar; Virus
- Debut: 2000

José Luis Grande Escalante (born July 19, 1979), better known by his ring name Pólvora, is a Mexican professional wrestler, best known for his work in the Mexican promotion Consejo Mundial de Lucha Libre (CMLL). Up until 2026 Pólvora was an masked wrestler, whose real name was not a matter of public record. His ring-name is the Spanish term for Gunpowder. Pólvora's brother is also a professional wrestler, under the ring name Inquisidor.

== Professional wrestling career ==
Pólvora made his professional wrestling debut in 2000, mainly teaming with his brother Vaquero on the Mexican independent circuit By 2005 both Pólvora and Vaquero began working for Consejo Mundial de Lucha Libre (CMLL), mainly on the promotions minor shows or in the opening match of their big shows from Arena México. On June 22, 2008, Pólvora and Vaquero participated in a tournament for the vacant CMLL Arena Coliseo Tag Team Championship, but lost in the opening round to Mictlán and Fabian el Gitano. The two brothers teamed up with mixed success from 2005 until mid-2008 but by July, 2008 Vaquero had left CMLL, leaving Pólvora without a regular tag team partner.

On April 7, 2009, Pólvora participated in a 10-man Torneo cibernetico for the vacant CMLL World Super Lightweight Championship. The other participants included Rey Cometa, Pegasso, Tiger Kid, Ángel Azteca, Jr., Inquisidor (Pólvora's brother Vaquero under a new persona), Súper Comando, Ángel de Oro, Ángel de Plata and eventual winner Máscara Dorada. On September 25, 2009, Pólvora was one of eight Novatos (rookies) that participated in the 2009 Gran Alternativa tournament, a tournament where an experienced wrestler teams up with a newcomer. Pólvora teamed up with Averno but did not make it past the first round of the tournament as they lost to Héctor Garza and Ángel de Plata. On October 18, 2009, Polvora was one of 12 wrestlers who put his mask on the line in a 12-man Luchas de Apuestas cage match. He is one of the last two men in the cage, wrestling and defeating Tigre Blanco. After the match Tigre Blanco was forced to unmask and reveal his real name per. Lucha Libre traditions. This was Pólvora's first ever Luchas de Apuesta win, a win that signalled CMLL had plans on moving him up on the card.

=== Los Cancerberos del Infierno ===
On November 18, 2009, CMLL presented a new Rudo group that they had formed, Los Cancerberos del Infierno ("The Infernal Cerberus") a team led by veteran mid-carder Virus and consisted of rookies Pólvora and Euforia as well as two new characters never used before - Raziel and Cancerbero. It was later revealed that Raziel and Cancerbero were not two new wrestlers CMLL brought in but actually two low card wrestlers that had been repackaged, Raziel was previously known as Caligula while Cancerbero was known as Messala. In late 2009 Pólvora teamed up with Euforia and Virus to represent Los Cancerberos in a tournament to crown new Mexican National Trios Champion. The team defeated Los Ángeles Celestiales (Ángel Azteca, Jr., Ángel de Plata and Ángel de Oro) in the first round, but lost to eventual tournament winners Máscara Dorada, Stuka, Jr. and Metro in the second round. Following the tournament loss Los Ángeles Celestiales and Los Cancerberos del Infierno have developed a rivalry between the two groups, facing off on various CMLL shows, including their Friday night CMLL Super Viernes show. On July 15, 2011, Pólvora defeated Valiente to win the Mexican National Welterweight Championship. Pólvora competed in CMLL's first ever En Busca de un Ídolo ("In search of an Idol") tournament, but did not qualify for the semi-final part of the tournament, finishing last in the point standings. He lost the Middleweight Championship to En Busca de un Ídolo tournament winner Titán on September 4, 2012.

=== Los Revolucionarios del Terror ===
Pólvora left Los Cancerberos in late November, 2012 and began teaming up with Rey Escorpión and Dragón Rojo, Jr. in their feud against Escorpión and Rojo's former Los Guerreros del Infierno teammates Último Guerrero, Niebla Roja and former Cancerbero Euforia. The group was later named Los Revolucionarios del Terror ("The Revolutionaries of Terror"). On November 11, 2012, Pólvora defeated Máscara Dorada to win the CMLL World Welterweight Championship during CMLL's Sunday night show in Arena Mexico. In late 2012/early 2013 Pólvora worked a series of matches against Valiente, building to a title match between the two as they fought for Pólvora's CMLL World Welterweight Championship. The match took place on XXXX and saw Pólvora retain the championship. In March 2013 Pólvora and Valiente were teamed up for the 2013 Torneo Nacional de Parejas Increibles ("National Incredible Pairs Tournament") a tag team tournament where the concept was that rivals would be forced to work together to win the tournament. While the two managed to work together they still lost their first round match to the team of Atlantis and Último Guerrero. On February 16, 2014, Pólvora lost the CMLL World Welterweight Championship to Místico. In July 2014, Dragón Rojo, Jr. quit Los Revolucionarios del Terror, but returned less than a year later. In January 2015, Pólvora made his New Japan Pro-Wrestling (NJPW) debut, when he worked the Fantastica Mania 2015 tour, co-produced by CMLL and NJPW. Pólvora worked the entire tour opposite Místico, culminating in a singles match between the two on January 19, where Místico was victorious.

=== Los Chacales Del Ring ===
Dragon Rojo Jr. & Polvora last teamed together in January 2019, signalling an end to Los Revolucionarios del Terror. Thereafter, Polvora's career slowed down. Aside from a 5-month Mexican National Tag Team Championship reign with Felino Jr. in 2021, his next point of note came on the 10th May, 2023 Informa, where it was announced he was forming a team with Okumura & El Coyote named Los Chacales Del Ring ("The Jackals of the Ring"). Although the unit drifted apart by 2025, Polvora & Coyote continued to team occasionally, resulting in their inclusion in the Infierno en el Ring match at the 2026 Sin Salida event. In a rarity for an Infierno match, multiple tag teams continued to feud coming out of it. This led to an 8-man "reverse Torneo cibernetico" Lucha de Apuestas match at the 2026 Homenaje a Dos Leyendas, which Polvora ultimately lost to Max Star, thus relinquishing his mask.

Shortly thereafter, Polvora announced that he & Coyote were forming a new trio with Vaquero Jr. named Los Forajidos.

== Championships and accomplishments ==
- Consejo Mundial de Lucha Libre

- CMLL World Welterweight Championship (1 time)
- Mexican National Welterweight Championship (1 time)
- Mexican National Tag Team Championship (1 time) - with Felino Jr.
- Torneo Gran Alternativa: 2010 – with Héctor Garza
- Physical Fitness: Advanced category 2009 winner.
- CMLL Bodybuilding Contest: Advanced Category (2008)

== Lucha de Apuesta record ==
Winner (wager)	Loser (wager)	Location	Event	Date	Notes
Pólvora (mask)	Tigre Blanco (mask)	Mexico City	CMLL show	October 18, 2009	(Note: They were the last two competitors in a twelve-man Lucha de Apuesta steel cage match.)
Max Star (mask)	Pólvora (mask)	Mexico City	Homenaje a Dos Leyendas 2026	March 20, 2026	(Note: They were the last two competitors in an eight-man Lucha de Apuesta "reverse cibernetico", also featuring Hombre Bala Jr., El Coyote, Cancerbero, Virus, Calavera Jr. I & Calavera Jr. II)
