= Hiroka Yaginuma =

Japanese born professional wrestler

Personal information
- Born: Hiroka Yaginuma; September 23, 1981 (age 44) Japan
- Spouse: Demus 3:16 (husband)

Professional wrestling career
- Ring name(s): Hiroka; Hiroka Yaginuma; Raven Hiroka
- Billed height: 1.55 m (5 ft 1 in)
- Billed weight: 45 kg (99 lb)
- Trained by: Mima Shimoda; Shinobu Kandori; Jose Luis Feliciano; El Hijo Del Gladiador
- Debut: September 18, 2002
- Retired: June 2010

Hiroka Yaginuma (born September 23, 1981) is a Japanese born professional wrestler. She is best known for her work in the Mexican professional wrestling promotion Consejo Mundial de Lucha Libre (CMLL). Yaginuma has worked under the ring names Hiroka Yaginuma and "Raven Hiroka" but is now billed simply as Hiroka. She is a former holder of the CMLL World Women's Championship. Yaginuma is married to Mexican Mini-Estrella Pequeño Damián 666 who also works for CMLL.

== Professional wrestling career ==
Hiroka Yaginuma trained under Mima Shimoda and Shinobu Kandori before her professional wrestling debut, and would later receive further training from Jose Luis Feliciano and El Hijo Del Gladiador when she began working for Consejo Mundial de Lucha Libre (CMLL) in Mexico. Yaginuma made her debut on September 18, 2002, and initially worked in her native Japan. In 2005, she began working regularly for the Mexican wrestling promotion CMLL as she moved from Japan to Mexico to live. Initially she wrestled under her full name but later changed to "Raven Hiroka" and later on to simply "Hiroka". On June 9, 2006, Hiroka defeated Marcela to win the CMLL World Women's Championship in Mexico City, D. F. Over the next six months Hiroka would successfully defend the championship against Marcela on several occasions, India Sioux, Dark Angel and Lady Apache. On October 13, 2006, Hiroka defeated Lady Apache in a Luchas de Apuestas (Spanish for "Bet match"), forcing Lady Apache to have her hair shaved off after the match. Two months later, on December 25, 2006, Lady Apache gained a measure of revenge by winning the CMLL Women's title from Hiroka.

In September, 2009 Hiroka formed a group rudo (villain) called Las Zorras ("The Foxes") along with Princesa Sujei and Princesa Blanca.

== Personal life ==
Yaginuma is married to Mexican Mini-Estrella Pequeño Damián 666 who also works for CMLL. The couple opened up an exclusive pet shop in Mexico City in March, 2010. In June, 2010 Hiroka announced that she would be retiring from wrestling to focus on having a child.

== Championships and accomplishments ==
- Consejo Mundial de Lucha Libre
  - CMLL World Women's Championship (1 time)

== Luchas de Apuestas record ==
Winner (wager)	Loser (wager)	Location	Event	Date	Notes
Hiroka (hair)	Lady Apache (hair)	Mexico City	CMLL show	October 13, 2006	
