= Sin Piedad =

Series of annual lucha libre, or professional wrestling major show

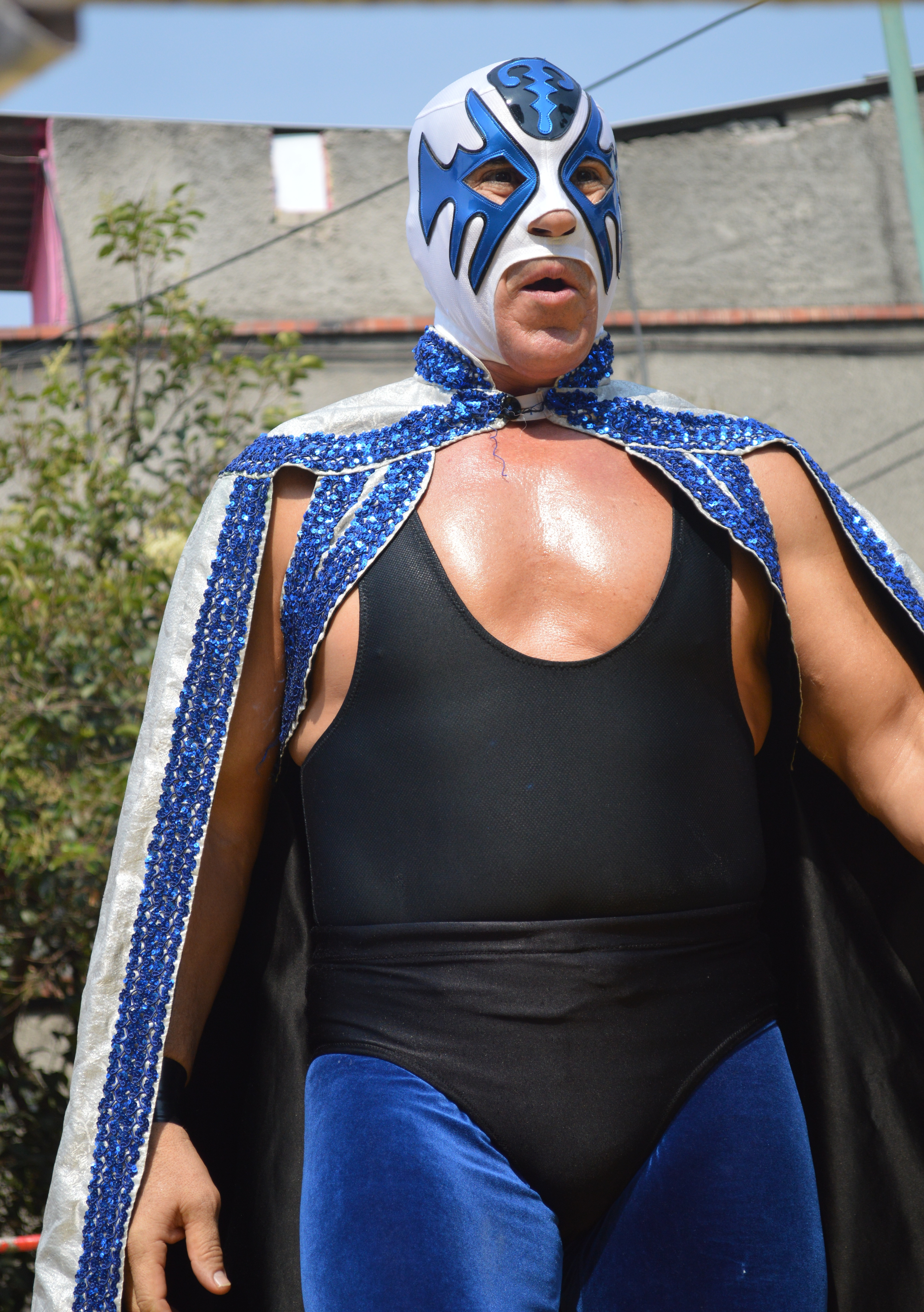
Atlantis, the only man to work 12 of the 13 shows

Sin Piedad (Spanish for "No Mercy" or "No Pity", not to be confused with a similarly-titled series of PPV's hosted by WWE) is the collective name of a series of annual lucha libre, or professional wrestling major show promoted by Mexican professional wrestling promotion Consejo Mundial de Lucha Libre (CMLL). The Sin Piedad show is CMLL's end of the year show, held in December. The first show held under the Sin Piedad took place in 2000, although CMLL has traditionally held a major event in December before then. Sin Piedad has been held eleven times so far, with the end of years event in 2005 billed as Juicio Final ("Final Judgment") and then 2009 event billed as Sin Salida ("No Escape") instead. In 2008 Sin Pidead was held in August, with no December show being held at all.

== Event history ==
The very first Sin Piedad event produced under that name took place on December 15, 2000 in Arena México, in Mexico City, replacing their regularly produced Friday night CMLL Super Viernes ("Super Friday") show. All subsequent Sin Piedad shows have taken place on Friday nights and all in Arena México, CMLL's "home arena". As of the 2012 show a total of 145 wrestlers have competed in 66 matches spread out over the 11 shows. 115 males 15 female and 15 Mini-Estrella competitors have worked the Sin Piedad shows. Atlantis is the wrestlers with the most Sin Piedad matches, ten in total or 91% of all shows so far. Marcela is the female wrestler with most matches, five in total, and Pierrothito is the most frequently featured Mini-Estrella with four matches in total. Demus 3:16 has worked under Sin Piedad shows two different ring names, Pequeño Damián 666 and Demus 3:16, while El Sagrado also worked a Sin Piedad show under his previous identity Genético. 77 wrestlers have only wrestled one Sin Pidedad match so far. (Note: The match statistics are supposed by the sources listed in the "Dates, venues and main events table.) The 11 shows has hosted 66 matches so far, six on each except for the 2003 show which only had 5 and the 2008 show which had 7 matches.

Twelve of the thirteen shows have featured one or more Lucha de Apuestas, or bet matches, the most prestigious match form in lucha libre. Only the 2012 event did not feature a Luchas de Apuesta match at all and the 2008 Sin Piedad was the only other show to not have a Luchas de Apuestas in the main event, but had one in the semi-main event instead. There has been a total of 16 Luchas de Apuestas matches in Sin Piedad history, with several shows having two such matches. In total three wrestlers lost their masks as a result of a Sin Piedad match; Pequeño Black Warrior, Mictlán and Ángel Azteca. Sixteen wrestlers in thirteen matches, three tag team matches and eight individual matches, have had their hair shaved off as a result of their Sin Piedad matches; El Felino, Mr. Águila, La Amapola, Black Warrior, Rey Bucanero (twice), Kenzo Suzuki, Marco Corleone, Pierroth (twice), Vampiro Canadiense, Brazo de Plata, Emilio Charles Jr., Cien Caras, Super Parka and Máscara Año 2000. Sin Piedad has hosted six championship matches, with three championship changes and three successful defenses. There have been two tournament finals held. first in 2003 the final for a tournament to determine the next holders of the Mexican National Trios Championship. in 2012 the main event of the show was the finals of the 2012 La Copa Junior Tournament Final.

== Dates, venues, and main events ==
Event	Date	City	Venue	Main Event
Sin Piedad (2000)	December 15, 2000	Mexico City, Mexico	Arena México	Perro Aguayo vs. Cien Caras in a Lucha de Apuestas hair vs. hair match.
Sin Piedad (2001)	December 14, 2001	Mexico City, Mexico	Arena México	Shocker vs. Emilio Charles Jr. in a Lucha de Apuestas, hair vs. hair match.
Sin Piedad (2002)	December 13, 2002	Mexico City, Mexico	Arena México	Vampiro Canadiense vs. Rey Bucanero in a Lucha de Apuestas hair vs. hair match.
Sin Piedad (2003)	December 5, 2003	Mexico City, Mexico	Arena México	Universo 2000 vs. Pierroth Jr. in a Lucha de Apuestas hair vs. hair match.
Sin Piedad (2004)	December 17, 2004	Mexico City, Mexico	Arena México	Los Hermanos Dinamita (Cien Caras and Máscara Año 2000) vs. Pierroth and Vampiro Canadiense in a Lucha de Apuestas mask and hair vs. hair and hair match.
Sin Piedad (2006)	December 15, 2006	Mexico City, Mexico	Arena México	Shocker and Universo 2000 vs. Kenzo Suzuki and Marco Corleone in a Lucha de Apuestas, hair vs. hair match.
Sin Piedad (2007)	December 7, 2007	Mexico City, Mexico	Arena México	Shocker and Lizmark Jr. vs. Black Warrior and Rey Bucanero in a Relevos Incredibles Tag team Lucha de Apuestas, hair vs. hair match.
Sin Piedad (2008)	August 29, 2008	Mexico City, Mexico	Arena México	Blue Panther, Dos Caras Jr. and Dr. Wagner Jr. vs. Black Warrior, Mr. Niebla and Rey Bucanero
Sin Piedad (2010)	December 3, 2010	Mexico City, Mexico	Arena México	Rey Bucanero vs. Mr. Águila
Sin Piedad (2011)	December 16, 2011	Mexico City, Mexico	Arena México	Blue Panther vs. El Felino in a Lucha de Apuestas hair vs. hair
Sin Piedad (2012)	December 13, 2012	Mexico City, Mexico	Arena México	La Sombra vs. Tama Tonga, 2012 La Copa Junior Tournament Final.
Sin Piedad (2016)	January 1, 2016	Mexico City, Mexico	Arena México	Super Parka vs. Negro Casas in a best two-out-of-three falls Lucha de Apuestas, hair vs. hair match.
Sin Piedad (2017)	January 1, 2017	Mexico City, Mexico	Arena México	Máximo Sexy vs. Máscara Año 2000 in a best two-out-of-three falls Lucha de Apuestas, hair vs. hair match.
Sin Piedad (2018)	January 1, 2018	Mexico City, Mexico	Arena México	Sam Adonis vs. Negro Casas in a best two-out-of-three falls Lucha de Apuestas, hair vs. hair match.
Sin Piedad (2019)	January 1, 2019	Mexico City, Mexico	Arena México	Caristico vs. Ultimo Guerrero in a best two-out-of-three falls match
Sin Piedad (2020)	January 1, 2020	Mexico City, Mexico	Arena México	Dulce Gardenia vs. Kawato-San in a best two-out-of-three falls Lucha de Apuestas, Hair vs. Hair match

== Sin Piedad Competitors ==
As of the 2012 Sin Piedad show

Name	Shows	Events
Aéreo	1	2017
Perro Aguayo Jr.	3	2003, 2004, 2007
Perro Aguayo	1	2000
La Amapola	4	2006, 2007, 2008, 2012
Ángel Azteca	1	2003
Ángel de Oro	2	2011, 2017
Arkangel de la Muerte	1	2003
Artillero	1	2006
Astral	2	2012, 2017
Atlantis	11	2000, 2001, 2002, 2003, 2004, 2006, 2007, 2008, 2010, 2011, 2017
Averno	6	2001, 2003, 2006, 2007, 2010, 2012
Bam Bam	1	2012
Bestia Salvaje	1	2000
Black Tiger (III)	1	2002
Black Warrior	5	2000, 2002, 2003, 2007, 2008
Blue Panther	4	2000, 2007, 2008, 2011
Blue Panther Jr.	1	2017
Bracito de Oro	1	2002
Brazo de Plata	3	2001, 2002, 2011
Negro Casas	9	2000, 2001, 2004, 2007, 2008, 2010, 2011, 2012, 2017
Emilio Charles Jr.	2	2000, 2001
Cien Caras	2	2000, 2004
Marco Corleone	3	2006, 2011, 2017
Dalys la Caribeña	1	2011
Damián 666	3	2001, 2006, 2007
Apolo Dantés	1	2002
Dark Angel	4	2006, 2007, 2012, 2010
Delta	2	2010, 2011
Demus 3:16 / Pequeño Damián 666	4	2008, 2011, 2012, 2017
Diamante Azul	1	2012
Dos Caras Jr.	4	2004, 2006, 2007, 2008
Dr. Wagner Jr.	5	2000, 2001, 2003, 2006, 2008
Doctor X	3	2001, 2002, 2004
Dragón Rojo Jr.	1	2008
Sonjay Dutt	1	2008
Eclipse	1	2006
Eléctrico	2	2010, 2011
Ephesto / Safari	9	2000, 2001, 2003, 2004, 2006, 2007, 2010, 2011, 2017
Espectrito	1	2004
Estrellita	2	2010, 2012
Euforia	1	2010
Fantasy	2	2008, 2012
El Felino	9	2000, 2003, 2004, 2007, 2008, 2010, 2011, 2012, 2017
Flash	1	2006
Fuerza Guerrera	2	2000, 2003
Héctor Garza	3	2004, 2006, 2010
Giganté Silva	1	2002
Guerrerito del Futuro	1	2002
Guerrero Maya Jr.	2	2011, 2017
Halloween	2	2001, 2006
Heavy Metal	1	2008
Hechicero	1	2017
El Hijo de Pierroth	1	2001
El Hijo del Fantasma	2	2008, 2010
El Hijo del Santo	3	2000, 2001, 2004
Hiroka	2	2006, 2007
El Hombre Sin Nombre	1	2001
Hooligan	2	2002, 2004
Juventud Guerrera	2	2001, 2002
L.A. Park	2	2006, 2007
Lady Apache	2	2008, 2011
Latino	1	2010
Lizmark Jr.	2	2001, 2007
Luna Mágica	2	2007, 2010
Marcela	5	2006, 2007, 2008, 2010, 2011
Marshall	1	2002
Ricky Marvin	1	2000
Masada	1	2002
Máscara Año 2000	3	2001, 2004, 2017
Máscara Dorada	1	2012
La Máscara	2	2008, 2010
Mascarita Dorada	1	2008
Máximo/Máximo Sexy	2	2011, 2017
Medusa	1	2007
Mephisto	7	2001, 2003, 2006, 2007, 2010, 2011, 2017
Mercurio	1	2017
Mictlán	1	2008
Misterioso Jr.	1	2008
Místico/Carístico	5	2004, 2006, 2007, 2010, 2017
Mr. Águila	2	2007, 2010
Mr. Niebla	5	2000, 2001, 2002, 2008, 2011,
Mr. Power	1	2002
Nicho el Millonario	1	2001
Nitro	1	2004
Nosawa	1	2002
Olímpico	4	2001, 2004, 2006, 2011
L.A. Park	2	2006, 2007
Pequeño Black Warrior	2	2008, 2010
Pequeño Olímpico	2	2008, 2012
Pierroth Jr.	3	2002, 2003, 2004
Pierrothito	4	2004, 2008, 2011, 2012
Pólvora	2	2010, 2017
Princesa Blanca	2	2011, 2012
Princesa Sujei	4	2006, 2008, 2011, 2012
Psicosis/Ripper	2	2011, 2017
Puma	1	2012
Bobby Quance	1	2003
Ramstein	1	2002
Rayo de Jalisco Jr.	1	2001
Rey Bucanero	9	2000, 2002, 2004, 2006, 2007, 2008, 2010, 2011, 2017
Rey Misterio Jr.	1	2001
Ricky Reyes	1	2003
Tony Rivera	2	2000, 2001
Rocky Romero	1	2003
Rush	2	2011, 2012
Chris Sabin	1	2008
El Sagrado / Genético	2	2002, 2007
Sahori	1	2006
Sangre Azteca	1	2010
El Satánico	4	2000, 2001, 2002, 2003
Alex Shelley	1	2008
Mima Shimoda	1	2010
Shocker	9	2000, 2001, 2002, 2003, 2004, 2006, 2007, 2010, 2012
Shockercito	1	2002
Silueta	1	2012
La Sombra	4	2007, 2008, 2010, 2012
Sombra de Plata	1	2000
Sombrita	1	2002
Alan Stone	2	2000, 2003
Chris Stone	1	2000
Jon Strongman	1	2010
Stuka Jr.	2	2010, 2017
Súper Comando	1	2006
Super Crazy	2	2002, 2003
Super Nova	2	2006, 2007
Super Parka	1	2003
Kenzo Suzuki	1	2006
Takemura	1	2002
Tarzan Boy	4	2000, 2001, 2004, 2006
El Terrible	3	2004, 2007, 2012
Tiffany	2	2010, 2011
Tigre Blanco	1	2001
Titán	1	2012
Tama Tonga	1	2012
Tritón	1	2012
Tzuki	1	2004
Último Dragón	1	2006
Último Dragóncito	3	2004, 2011, 2017
Último Guerrero	7	2000, 2002, 2004, 2006, 2007, 2008, 2012
Universo 2000	4	2001, 2003, 2004, 2006
Valiente	5	2007, 2010, 2011, 2012, 2017
Vampiro Canadiense	3	2002, 2003, 2004
Veneno	1	2001
Villano III	1	2000
Villano IV	1	2000
Villano V	1	2000
Violencia	1	2000
Virus	1	2007
Volador Jr.	7	2001, 2003, 2004, 2006, 2011, 2012, 2017
Bobby Z	1	2017
Zumbido	1	2003
