= Leyenda de Azul =

Consejo Mundial de Lucha Libre tournament

Details
- Promotion: Consejo Mundial de Lucha Libre
- Date established: October 27, 2000
- Current champion: Rush
- Date won: December 22, 2017
Statistics
- First champion: Blue Panther
- Most reigns: No multiple champions

The Leyenda de Azul (Spanish for "the Blue Legend") is a lucha libre tournament held seven times by the Mexican professional wrestling promotion Consejo Mundial de Lucha Libre (CMLL) between 2000 and 2008 and again in 2011 and 2012. The tournament honors Blue Demon, or Demonio Azul as he's sometimes referred to. The tournament is not nearly as prestigious as CMLL's annual Leyenda de Plata tournament. The winner is given a plaque with a Blue Demon mask on it and a championship belt featuring Blue Demon as well. All tournaments have taken place in Arena México in Mexico City and all were held on Fridays during CMLL's Super Viernes show. In 2009 Blue Demon Jr. threatened to take legal action against CMLL on behalf of the National Wrestling Alliance over CMLL's use of three NWA branded championships. While CMLL did not publicly respond to the threat they dropped the tournament from their schedule for two years. In July 2011, CMLL, still not on good terms with Blue Demon Jr., announced the return of the tournament. The tournament would instead be endorsed by Blue Demon's biological son and Blue Demon Jr.'s adopted brother, El Hijo de Blue Demon.

== Tournament winners ==
Year	Winner	Defeated	Date	Note
2000	Blue Panther	Mr. Niebla	October 27, 2000	
2003	Tarzan Boy	Shocker	August 8, 2003	
2004	Universo 2000	Canek	October 8, 2004	
2005	Lizmark Jr.	Último Guerrero	July 15, 2005	
2006	Rey Bucanero	Atlantis	November 3, 2006	
2008	El Terrible	Marco Corleone	December 12, 2008	
2011	Mr. Niebla	Atlantis	July 29, 2011	
2012	Diamante Azul	Último Guerrero	October 12, 2012	
2014	Atlantis	Último Guerrero	June 20, 2014	
2016	Último Guerrero	Valiente	November 18, 2016	
2017	Rush	Euforia	December 22, 2017	
2020	Ángel de Oro	Diamante Azul	November 27, 2020	
2021	Soberano Jr.	Atlantis Jr.	November 26, 2021	
2022	Euforia	Ángel de Oro	November 25, 2022	
2023	Hechicero	Stuka Jr.	November 24, 2023	
2024	Místico	Hechicero	November 29, 2024	
2025	Bárbaro Cavernario	Soberano Jr. & Místico	November 28, 2025	

== Leyenda de Azul 2000 ==
Leyenda de Azul (2000)
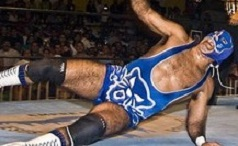
- Blue Panther, first ever tournament winner
- Promotion: Consejo Mundial de Lucha Libre
- Date: October 27, 2000
- City: Mexico City, Mexico
- Venue: Arena Mexico

Event chronology
← Previous; CMLL 67th Anniversary Show	Next → Sin Piedad

Leyenda de Azul chronology
← Previous; First	Next → 2003

The first Leyenda de Azul tournament took place on October 27, 2000, just 21 days after the 2000 version of the Leyenda de Plata tournament. 16 men competed in a Torneo cibernetico match for the trophy. Only the second half of the match was shown on television, which means that the order of the first eight eliminations is only known to the people in attendance at Arena México that night. The first eight are listed alphabetically. During the match Máscara Año 2000 allowed himself to get pinned by Shocker while he himself had Shocker pinned to ensure that Shocker was eliminated from the tournament. Blue Panther won the torneo cibernetico when he pinned Mr. Niebla.

#	Eliminated	Eliminated by	Time
#	Brazo de Plata	Unknown	
#	Bestia Salvaje	Unknown	
#	Cien Caras	Unknown	
#	Emilio Charles Jr.	Unknown	
#	Lizmark Jr.	Unknown	
#	Perro Aguayo	Unknown	
#	Rayo de Jalisco Jr.	Unknown	
#	Villano IV	Unknown	
9	Apolo Dantés	Unknown	
10	Villano III	Unknown	
11	Universo 2000	Unknown	
12	Shocker	Máscara Año 2000 (double pin)	
13	Máscara Año 2000	Shocker (double pin)	
14	El Satánico	Mr. Niebla	
15	Mr. Niebla	Blue Panther	
16	Winner	Blue Panther	

== Leyenda de Azul 2003 ==
Leyenda de Azul (2003)
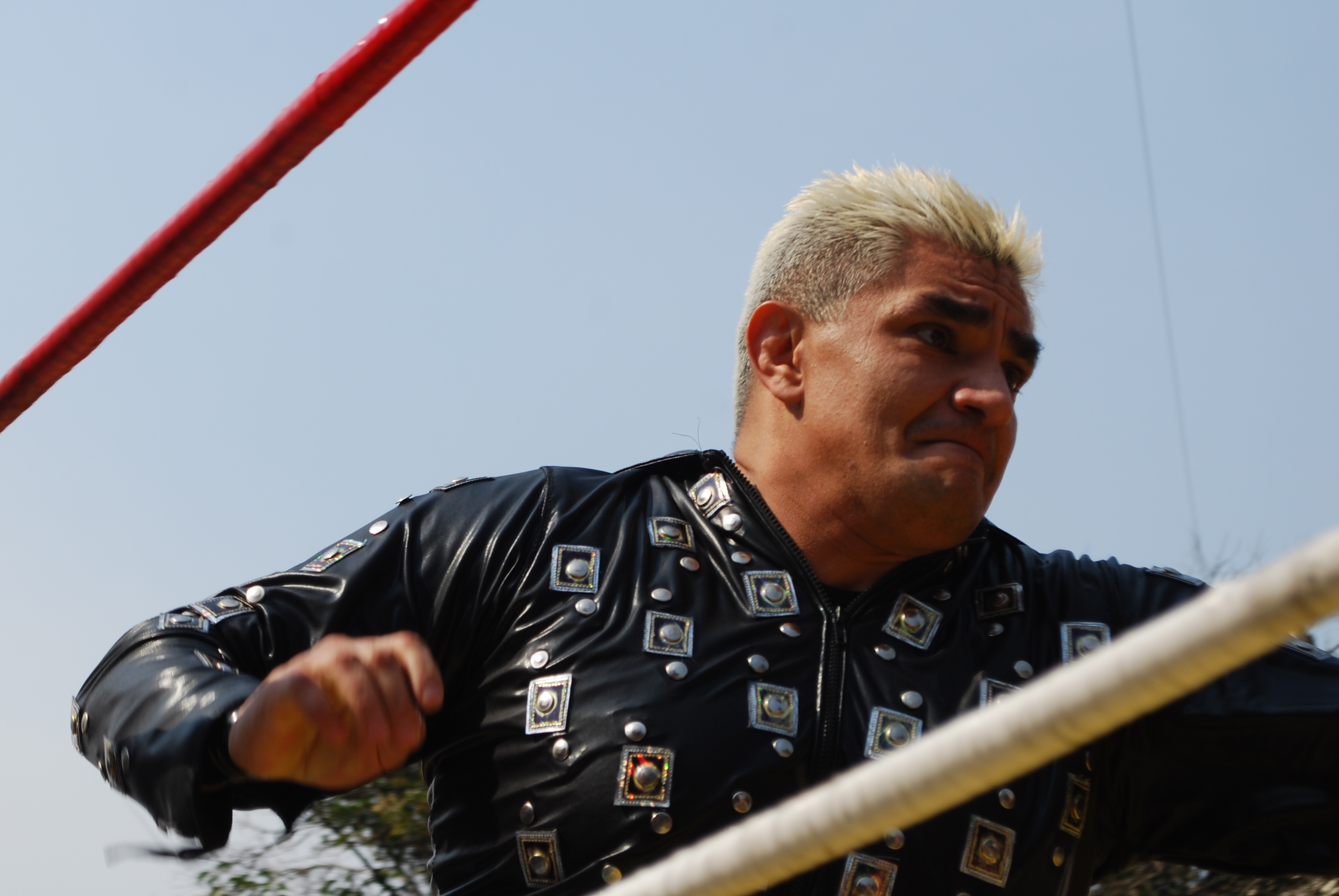
- Shocker, last man eliminated in the tournament
- Promotion: Consejo Mundial de Lucha Libre
- Date: August 8, 2003
- City: Mexico City, Mexico
- Venue: Arena Mexico

Event chronology
← Previous; International Gran Prix	Next → CMLL 70th Anniversary Show

Leyenda de Azul chronology
← Previous; 2000	Next → 2004

CMLL did not hold a Leyenda de Azul in 2001 or 2002 but did promote the tournament in 2003. Like the first Leyenda de Azul, the second version also centered around a 16-man Torneo cibernetico match. The match came down to Shocker and Tarzan Boy, at the time both mid-card wrestlers hoping to move into the main event picture. Tarzan Boy pinned Shocker to win the 2003 Leyenda de Azul trophy.

#	Eliminated	Eliminated by	Time
1	Villano IV	Unknown	
2	Máscara Año 2000	Unknown	
3	Pierroth Jr.	Unknown	
4	Violencia	Unknown	
5	Takemura	Unknown	
6	Black Tiger	Unknown	
7	Mr. Niebla	Unknown	
8	Blue Panther	Unknown	
9	Lizmark Jr.	Unknown	
10	Vampiro	Unknown	
11	Rey Bucanero	Unknown	
12	Rayo de Jalisco Jr.	Unknown	
13	Dr. Wagner Jr.	Unknown	
14	Último Guerrero	Shocker	
15	Shocker	Tarzan Boy	
16	Winner	Tarzan Boy	

== Leyenda de Azul 2004 ==
Leyenda de Azul (2004)
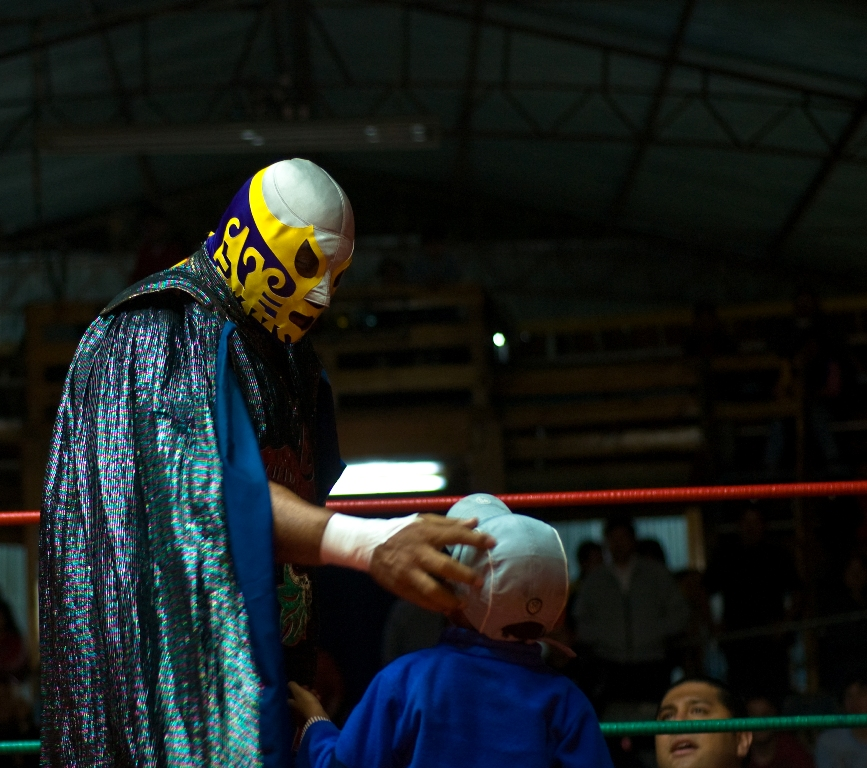
- Canek, last man eliminated in the tournament
- Promotion: Consejo Mundial de Lucha Libre
- Date: October 8, 2004
- City: Mexico City, Mexico
- Venue: Arena Mexico

Event chronology
← Previous; CMLL 71st Anniversary Show	Next → Sin Piedad

Leyenda de Azul chronology
← Previous; 2003	Next → 2005

The third Leyenda de Azul tournament took place on October 8, 2004, and like the two previous Leyenda de Azul tournaments featured a 16-man torneo cibernetico. The final two wrestlers in the match were Canek and Universo 2000. Universo 2000 pinned Canek to win the tournament, gaining a small measure of revenge on the man that beat him for his mask only three weeks prior at the CMLL 71st Anniversary Show.

#	Eliminated	Eliminated by	Time
1	Apolo Dantés	Brazo de Plata	11:12
2	Máscara Sagrada	Cien Caras	12:57
3	El Satánico	Héctor Garza	13:50
4	Cien Caras	Rayo de Jalisco Jr.	14:48
5	Rayo de Jalisco Jr.	Universo 2000	15:50
6	Black Tiger	Black Warrior	17:48
7	Vampiro	Mr. Niebla	19:23
8	Dr. Wagner Jr.	Universo 2000	21:29
9	El Terrible	Canek	23:10
10	Brazo de Plata	Héctor Garza	24:03
11	Mr. Niebla	Pierroth Jr.	24:39
12	Black Warrior	Héctor Garza	26:44
13	Héctor Garza	Black Warrior (Double elimination)	26:44
14	Pierroth Jr.	Canek	28:00
15	Canek	Universo 2000	29:37
16	Winner	Universo 2000	29:37

== Leyenda de Azul 2005 ==
Leyenda de Azul (2005)
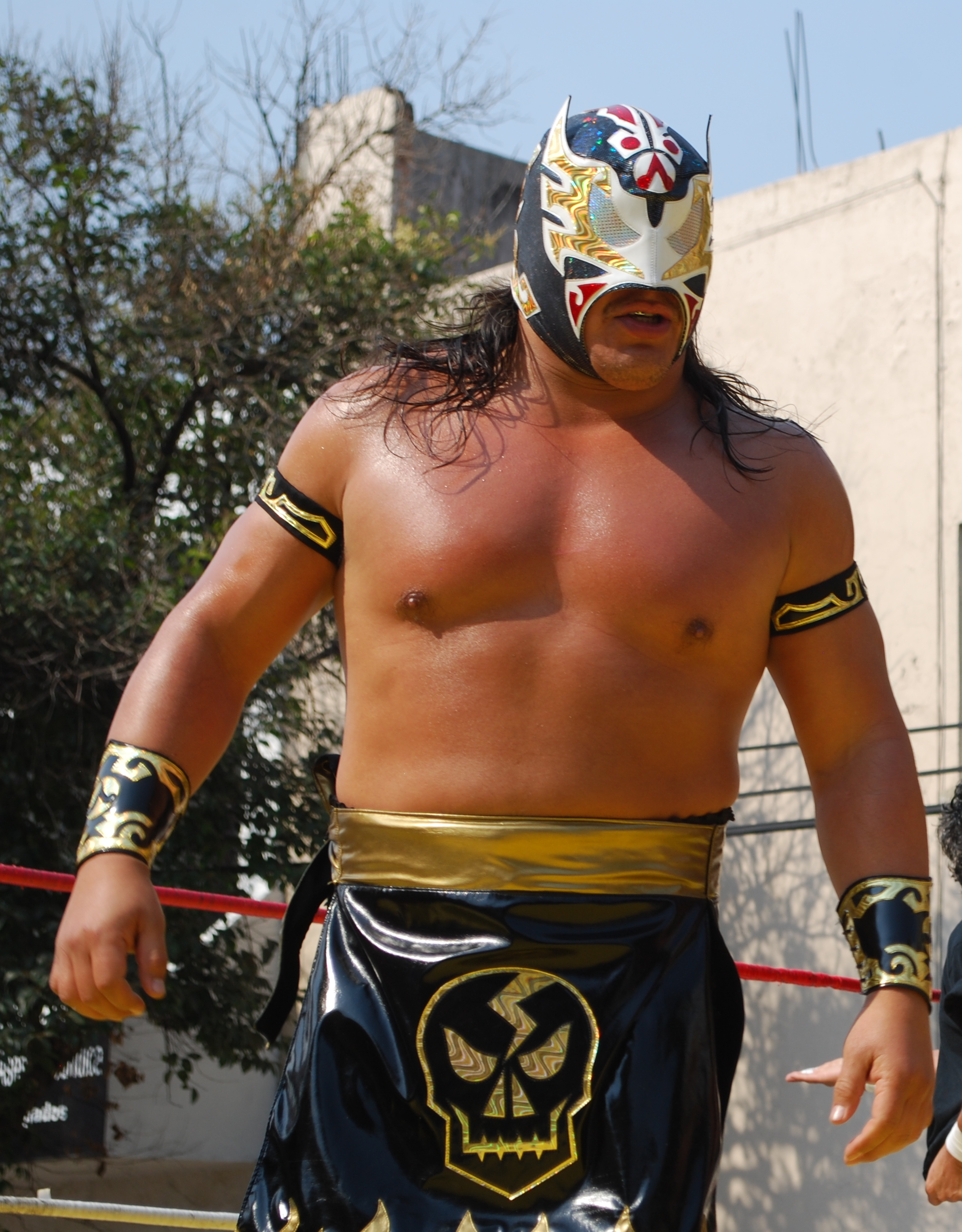
- Último Guerrero, tournament finalist
- Promotion: Consejo Mundial de Lucha Libre
- Date: July 15, 2005
- City: Mexico City, Mexico
- Venue: Arena Mexico

Event chronology
← Previous; Torneo Gran Alternativa	Next → CMLL 72nd Anniversary Show

Leyenda de Azul chronology
← Previous; 2004	Next → 2006

The fourth Leyenda de Azul took place on July 15, 2005. Unlike previous years' tournaments CMLL did not use the torneo cibernetico format but instead opted for a 16-man, one night tournament to take place on the July 15, 2005 CMLL Super Viernes show. The winner of the tournament would also be considered the first CMLL World G1 Heavyweight Champion and win a place in New Japan Pro-Wrestling's (NJPW) upcoming G1 Climax tour in August, 2005. While it was never confirmed officially it is believed that NJPW actually decided who they wanted to tour with them and thus who won the tournament. The final match saw Lizmark Jr. pin Último Guerrero to earn both the Leyenda de Azul trophy and the CMLL World G1 Heavyweight Champion. The G1 championship was never referred to again after July 15, 2005, not even when Lizmark Jr. competed in NJPW.

First round
Lizmark Jr.	W
Olímpico
Black Warrior	W
Máscara Sagrada
Pierroth Jr.	W
Blue Demon Jr.
Brazo de Plata
Héctor Garza	W
6	Dos Caras Jr.	W
11	Tarzan Boy
3	Heavy Metal
14	Rey Bucanero	W
7	Rayo de Jalisco Jr.	W
10	Canek
2	El Bronco
15	Último Guerrero	W

Second round
Lizmark Jr.	W
Black Warrior
Pierroth Jr.
Héctor Garza	W
Dos Caras Jr.	W
Rey Bucanero
Rayo de Jalisco Jr.
Último Guerrero	W

Semifinals
Lizmark Jr.	W
Héctor Garza
Dos Caras Jr.
Último Guerrero	W

Final
Lizmark Jr.
Último Guerrero

== Leyenda de Azul 2006 ==
Leyenda de Azul (2006)
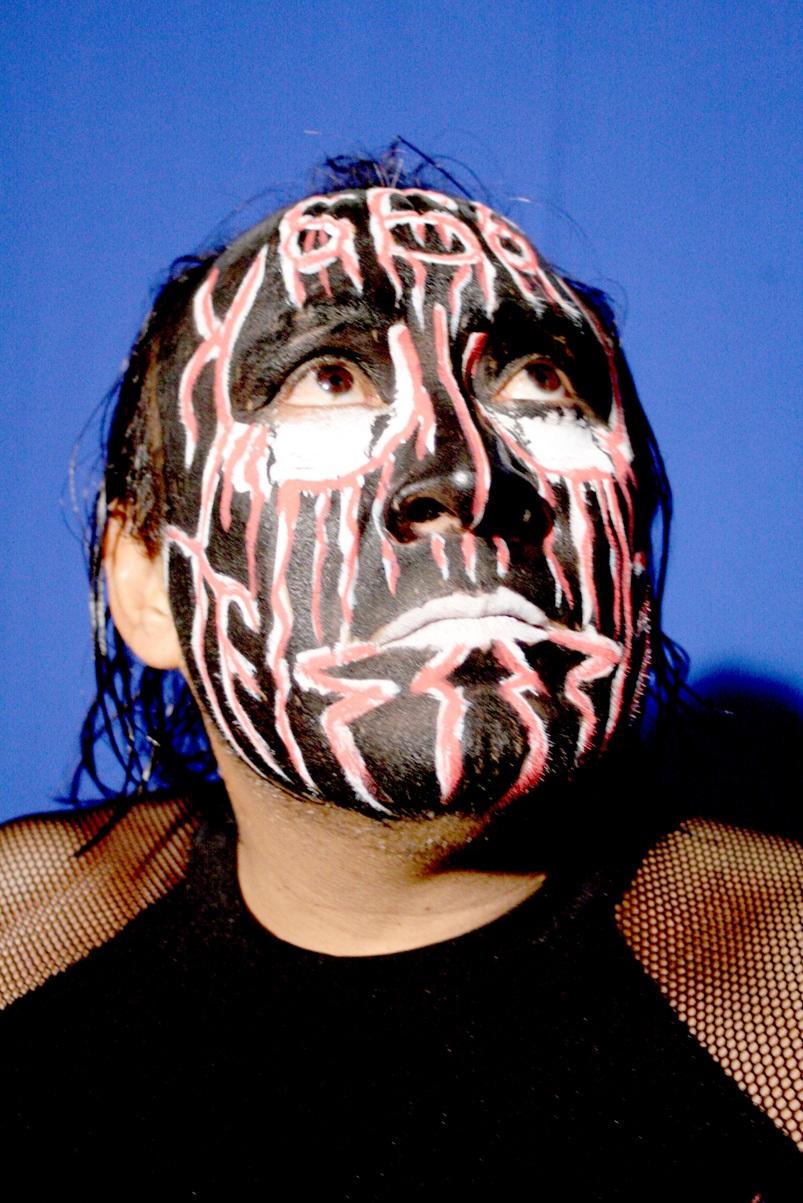
- Damián 666, eliminated in the first round
- Promotion: Consejo Mundial de Lucha Libre
- Date: November 3, 2006
- City: Mexico City, Mexico
- Venue: Arena Mexico

Event chronology
← Previous; CMLL 73rd Anniversary Show	Next → Sin Piedad

Leyenda de Azul chronology
← Previous; 2005	Next → 2008

The 5th Leyenda de Azul took place on November 4, 2006, and was like the 2005 version a one night, 16-man single elimination tournament. CMLL used the same tournament format as the previous year as they had the winner of the first and the last match of the first round face off in the finals. The finals saw Rey Bucanero defeat Atlantis to win the trophy and belt.

First round
Rey Bucanero	W
Damián 666
Heavy Metal
Black Warrior	W
Último Guerrero	W
Damian El Terrible
Olímpico
Héctor Garza	W
6	Dr. Wagner Jr.	W
11	Pierroth Jr.
3	Hirooki Goto
14	Alex Koslov	W
7	Lizmark Jr.	W
10	Halloween
2	Último Dragón
15	Atlantis	W

Second round
Rey Bucanero	W
Black Warrior
Último Guerrero
Héctor Garza	W
Dr. Wagner Jr.	W
Alex Koslov
Lizmark Jr.
Atlantis	W

Semifinals
Rey Bucanero	W
Héctor Garza
Dr. Wagner Jr.
Atlantis	W

Final
Rey Bucanero
Atlantis

== Leyenda de Azul 2008 ==
Leyenda de Azul (2008)
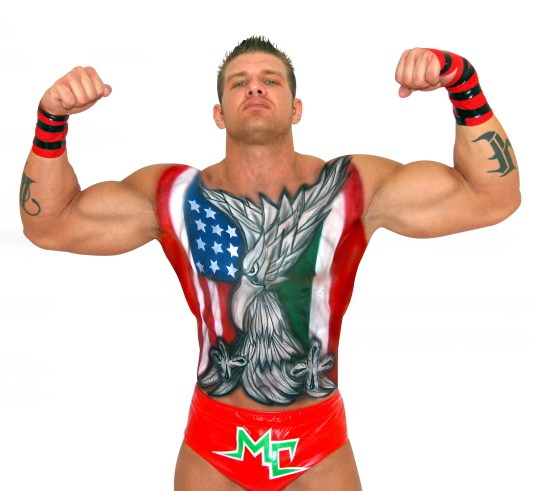
- Marco Corleone, last man eliminated in the tournament
- Promotion: Consejo Mundial de Lucha Libre
- Date: December 12, 2008
- City: Mexico City, Mexico
- Venue: Arena Mexico

Event chronology
← Previous; CMLL 75th Anniversary Show	Next → Pequeños Reyes del Aire

Leyenda de Azul chronology
← Previous; 2006	Next → 2011

The sixth Leyenda de Azul took place on December 12, 2008, and was the focal point of CMLL's Friday night CMLL Super Viernes show. This tournament was the first Leyenda de Azul tournament to see the winner being crowned as a result of outside interference as Ephesto and El Texano Jr. helped El Terrible overcome Marco Corleone to win the tournament.

#	Eliminated	Eliminated by	Time
1	Máximo	Misterioso II	12:28
2	Ephesto	El Sagrado	16:36
3	Valiente	Rey Bucanero	17:30
4	Misterioso II	Toscano	18:29
5	Sagrado	Villano V	20:23
6	Villano V	Shocker	21:02
7	Toscano	El Texano Jr.	22:58
8	Rey Bucanero	Blue Panther	24:29
9	Blue Panther	Mr. Niebla	25:40
10	Shocker	Atlantis	26:27
11	Mr. Niebla	Dos Caras Jr.	28:38
12	Atlantis	Marco Corleone	30:11
13	Dos Caras Jr.	El Terrible and El Texano Jr.	34:12
14	El Texano Jr.	Marco Corleone	35:04
15	Marco Corleone	El Terrible	36:21
16	Winner	El Terrible	36:21

== Leyenda de Azul 2011 ==
Leyenda de Azul (2011)
- Officia poster advertising the 2011 Leyenda de Azul tournament
- Promotion: Consejo Mundial de Lucha Libre
- Date: July 29, 2011
- City: Mexico City, Mexico
- Venue: Arena Mexico

Event chronology
← Previous; Juicio Final	Next → Mini-Estrellas Torneo de Parejas Increibles

Leyenda de Azul chronology
← Previous; 2008	Next → 2012

On July 25, 2011, CMLL released a poster for an event, which revealed that after a two-year break, Leyenda de Azul would return on July 29. While CMLL was still on bad terms with Blue Demon Jr., the tournament was instead endorsed by his adopted brother and Blue Demon's biological son, El Hijo de Blue Demon, who also presented Mr. Niebla with the trophy after his win.

#	Eliminated	Eliminated by	Time
1	Metro	Psicosis	
2	Psicosis	El Hijo del Fantasma	
3	Ángel de Oro	Rey Bucanero	
4	Último Guerrero	Jon Strongman	
5	Jon Strongman	Rey Bucanero, El Terrible and El Texano Jr.	
6	Rey Bucanero	Shocker	
7	El Hijo del Fantasma	El Texano Jr.	
8	El Texano Jr.	Rush	
9	Shocker	El Terrible	
10	El Terrible	Shocker (Double elimination)	
11	Blue Panther	Héctor Garza	
12	Héctor Garza	Rush	
13	Rush	Mr. Niebla	
14	Máximo	Atlantis	
15	Atlantis	Mr. Niebla	
16	Winner	Mr. Niebla	

== Leyenda de Azul 2012 ==
Leyenda de Azul (2012)
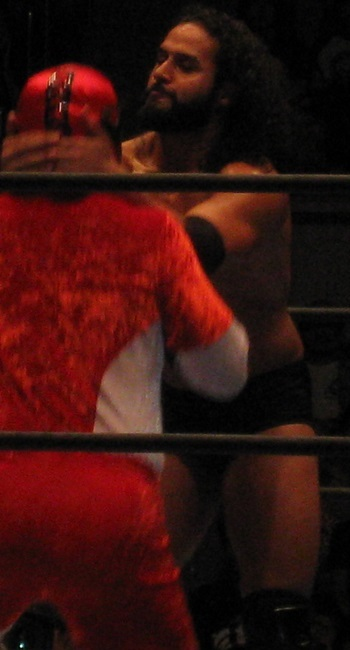
- Tama Tonga, 2012 participant.
- Promotion: Consejo Mundial de Lucha Libre
- Date: October 12, 2012
- City: Mexico City, Mexico
- Venue: Arena Mexico

Event chronology
← Previous; CMLL 79th Anniversary Show	Next → Reyes del Aire

Leyenda de Azul chronology
← Previous; 2011	Next → 2014

The eighth Leyenda de Azul tournament took place on October 12, 2012, on CMLL's Super Viernes show. The match included 16 wrestlers in total and saw Diamante Azul win the tournament.

#	Eliminated	Eliminated by	Time
1	Misterioso Jr.	Brazo de Plata	
2	Diamante	Euforia	
3	Kráneo	Diamante Azul	
4	Brazo de Plata	El Terrible	
5	Rush	El Terrible (double elimination)	
5	El Terrible	Rush (double elimination)	
7	Marco Corleone	Euforia and Último Guerrero	
8	Tama Tonga	Atlantis and Shocker	
9	Shocker	Mr. Águila	
10	Euforia	La Sombra	
11	Mr. Águila	Atlantis	
12	La Sombra	Volador Jr.	
13	Atlantis	Último Guerrero	
14	Volador Jr.	Diamante Azul	
15	Último Guerrero	Diamante Azul	
16	Winner	Diamante Azul	

== Leyenda de Azul 2014 ==
Leyenda de Azul (2014)
- Poster for the 2014 Leyenda de Azul tournament
- Promotion: Consejo Mundial de Lucha Libre
- Date: June 20, 2014
- City: Mexico City, Mexico
- Venue: Arena Mexico

Event chronology
← Previous; 58. Aniversario de Arena México	Next → Juicio Final

Leyenda de Azul chronology
← Previous; 2012	Next → 2016

After no Leyenda de Azul tournament in 2013 CMLL promoted the ninth version of the event on June 20, 2014, as the main event of their weekly Super Viernes ("Super Friday") show. The tournament format saw 16 men complete in a Torneo cibernetico elimination match. The finals of the match saw Atlantis eliminate long time rival Último Guerrero to win the tournament.

Leyenda de Azul 2014 Order of elimination

#	Eliminated	Eliminated by	Time
1	Vangelis	Brazo de Plata	
2	Rey Escorpión	Dragón Rojo Jr.	
3	La Sombra	By Disqualification	
4	Euforia	By Disqualification	
5	Brazo de Plata		
6	Mr. Niebla	Shocker	
7	El Terrible		
8	Dragón Rojo Jr.	Valiente	
9	Shocker	La Mascara	
10	Máximo	Rush	
11	Rey Bucanero	Valiente	
12	Valiente	La Mascara	
13	La Mascara	Atlantis	
14	Rush	Último Guerrero	
15	Último Guerrero	Atlantis	
16	Winner	Atlantis	

== Leyenda de Azul 2016 ==
Leyenda de Azul (2016)
- Promotion: Consejo Mundial de Lucha Libre
- Date: November 18, 2016
- City: Mexico City, Mexico
- Venue: Arena México

Pay-per-view chronology
← Previous; Día de Muertos	Next → Infierno en el Ring

Leyenda de Azul chronology
← Previous; 2014	Next → 2017

The 2016 Leyenda de Azul (Spanish for "Blue Legend") was a one-night professional wrestling tournament, produced and scripted by the Mexican professional wrestling promotion Consejo Mundial de Lucha Libre (CMLL; Spanish for "World Wrestling Council") that was held on November 18, 2016 as part of their weekly Super Viernes show held at Arena México in Mexico City, Mexico. The 18-man torneo cibernetico elimination match was held in honor of Blue Demon, and was the tenth time CMLL held the Leyenda de Azul tournament.

The teams for the 16-man torneo cibernetico match were split by the rudo/tecnico ("bad guys"/"good guys") roles each wrestler portrayed with Team Tecnico consisting of Atlantis, Blue Panther, Marco Corleone, Diamante Azul, Máximo Sexy, Stuka Jr., and Valiente, while Team Rudo consisted of Euforia, Gran Guerrero, Hechicero, Kráneo, La Máscara, Rey Bucanero, El Terrible, and Último Guerrero. The match ended with Último Guerrero pinning Valiente to eliminate him and win the Leyenda de Plata for the first time.

Leyenda de Azul 2016 Order of elimination

#	Eliminated	Eliminated by	Time
1	Stuka Jr.	Gran Guerrero	07:21
2	Blue Panther	Máximo Sexy	09:00
3	Rey Bucanero	Diamante Azul	12:21
4	Gran Guerrero	La Máscara	15:31
5	Máscara Año 2000	Máximo Sexy	17:59
6	Marco Corleone	Kraneo	20:28
7	Hechicero	Euforia	22:04
8	Kraneo	Atlantis	22:47
9	La Máscara	Valiente	23:11
10	El Terrible	Último Guerrero	23:48
11	Euforia	Double disqualification	24:34
12	Diamante Azul	Double disqualification	24:34
13	Máximo Sexy	Último Guerrero	25:37
14	Atlantis	Valiente	27:07
15	Valiente	Último Guerrero	
16	Winner	Último Guerrero	

== Leyenda de Azul 2017 ==
Leyenda de Azul (2017)
- Promotion: Consejo Mundial de Lucha Libre
- Date: December 22, 2017
- City: Mexico City, Mexico
- Venue: Arena México

Pay-per-view chronology
← Previous; La Copa Junior	Next → Sin Salida

Leyenda de Azul chronology
← Previous; 2016	Next → —

The 2017 Leyenda de Azul (Spanish for "Blue Legend") was a one-night professional wrestling tournament, produced and scripted by the Mexican professional wrestling promotion Consejo Mundial de Lucha Libre (CMLL; Spanish for "World Wrestling Council") that was held on December 22, 2017 as part of their weekly Super Viernes show held at Arena México in Mexico City, Mexico. The 18-man torneo cibernetico elimination match was held in honor of Blue Demon, and was the eleventh time CMLL held the Leyenda de Azul tournament.

The 2017 competitors first faced off in a battle royal to determine the teams for the main match. Team "A" consisted of Euforia, Forastero, Máscara Año 2000, Mr. Niebla, El Terrible, Rush, Vangellys and Sansón while Team "B" consisted of Último Guerrero, Shocker, Kráneo, Rey Bucanero, Gran Guerrero, Pierroth, Hechicero, and Misterioso Jr. In the end Rush won the tournament, lastly eliminating Euforia to win the event.

Leyenda de Azul 2017 Order of elimination

#	Eliminated	Eliminated by	Time
1	Misterioso Jr.	Sansón	09:10
2	Vangellys	Hechicero	13:11
3	Máscara Año 2000	Pierroth	13:34
4	Shocker	Euforia	14:12
5	Forastero	Rey Bucanero	15:16
6	Rey Bucanero	Mr. Niebla	17:58
7	Gran Guerrero	Mr. Niebla (double pin)	21:30
8	Mr. Niebla	Gran Guerrero (double pin)	21:30
9	Hechicero	Rush	22:20
10	Sansón	Kraneo	23:05
11	Kraneo	El Terrible	23:32
12	El Terrible	Último Guerrero	24:33
13	Último Guerrero	Rush	25:44
14	Pierroth	Euforia	26:54
15	Euforia	Rush	28:40
16	Winner	Rush	28:40
