= Sin Piedad (2019) =

2019 Consejo Mundial de Lucha Libre event

- Promotion: Consejo Mundial de Lucha Libre
- Date: January 1, 2019
- City: Mexico City, Mexico
- Venue: Arena México

Pay-per-view chronology
← Previous; Leyendas Mexicanas	Next → Reyes del Aire

Sin Piedad chronology
← Previous; 2018	Next → 2020

Sin Piedad (2019) (Spanish for "No Mercy") was a major professional wrestling event produced by the Mexican Lucha Libre promotion Consejo Mundial de Lucha Libre (CMLL). The 2019 Sin Piedad show was held on January 1, the fourth successive year that CMLL had held the show on New Year's Day, in Arena México, Mexico City, Mexico.

== Production ==
=== Background ===
The Mexican wrestling company Consejo Mundial de Lucha Libre (Spanish for "World Wrestling Council"; CMLL) has held a number of major shows over the years using the moniker Sin Piedad ("No Pity" or "No Mercy"). CMLL has intermittently held a show billed specifically as Sin Piedad since 2000, primarily using the name for their "end of the year" show in December, although once they held a Sin Piedad show in August as well. CMLL has on occasion used a different name for the end-of-year show but Sin Piedad is the most commonly used name. All Sin Piedad shows have been held in Arena México in Mexico City, Mexico which is CMLL's main venue, its "home". The 2018 Sin Piedad was the third show held on New Year's Day, after the 2016 and 2017 shows.

Starting in 2011 CMLL has been promoting a New Year's Day show with bigger, more prominent and promoted matches, although they did not specifically promote the shows under a special event name, they were simply a special version of their weekly Arena Mexico shows. Starting in 2011 CMLL added at least one high-profile match to their shows, slowly building them into a special event. in 2011 the show featured the annual Reyes del Aire ("Kings of the Air") tournament, won by Ángel de Oro. In 2012 the January 1 show saw Hombre Bala Jr. and Super Halcón Jr. defeated the team known as Los Rayos Tapatío in a Luchas de Apuestas, masks vs masks match in what turned out to be Los Rayos last match in CMLL. The main event of the 2012 was the finals of a tournament for the vacant CMLL World Heavyweight Championship which was El Terrible defeat Rush 17th heavyweight champion. The 2013 start of the year show was highlighted first by then CMLL World Welterweight Champion Pólvora successfully defending against Titán and then the team of Boby Zavala and Disturbio defeated Leono and Tigre Blanco, forcing Leono and Blanco to have their hair shaved off as a result. The 2014 show, the last January 1 show without a specific title saw Super Halcón Jr. win that year's La Copa Junior tournament. The 2019 Sin Piedad show was the 14th show under the Sin Piedad label.

=== Storylines ===
The event featured six professional wrestling matches with different wrestlers involved in pre-existing scripted feuds, plots and storylines. Wrestlers were portrayed as either heels (referred to as rudos in Mexico, those that portray the "bad guys") or faces (técnicos in Mexico, the "good guy" characters) as they followed a series of tension-building events, which culminated in a wrestling match or series of matches.

== Results ==
No.	Results	Stipulations	Times
1	El Coyote and Grako defeated Arkalis and Robin	Best two-out-of-three falls tag team match	11:52
2	Dalys la Caribeña, La Amapola and La Seductora defeated Avispa Dorada, La Jarochita and Lluvia	Best two-out-of-three falls six woman tag team match	13:11
3	El Hijo del Signo (Hair) and Yago (Mask) defeated Akuma (Mask) and Camorra (Hair)	Best two-out-of-three falls tag team Lucha de Apuestas, Mask and Hair Vs. Mask and Hair match	16:43
4	Los Gorilas Del Ring (Kraneo And Volcano) and El Hijo de LA Park defeated El Felino, El Hijo del Villano III, and Villano IV	Best two-out-of-three falls six-man tag team match	12:52
5	Los Lucha Brothers (King Phoenix and Penta El 0M) and Dragon Lee defeated La Sangre Dinamita (El Cuatrero and Forastero) and Templario	Best two-out-of-three falls six man tag team match	11:08
6	Caristico defeated Último Guerrero	Best two-out-of-three falls match	6:19
