= Sin Piedad (2002) =

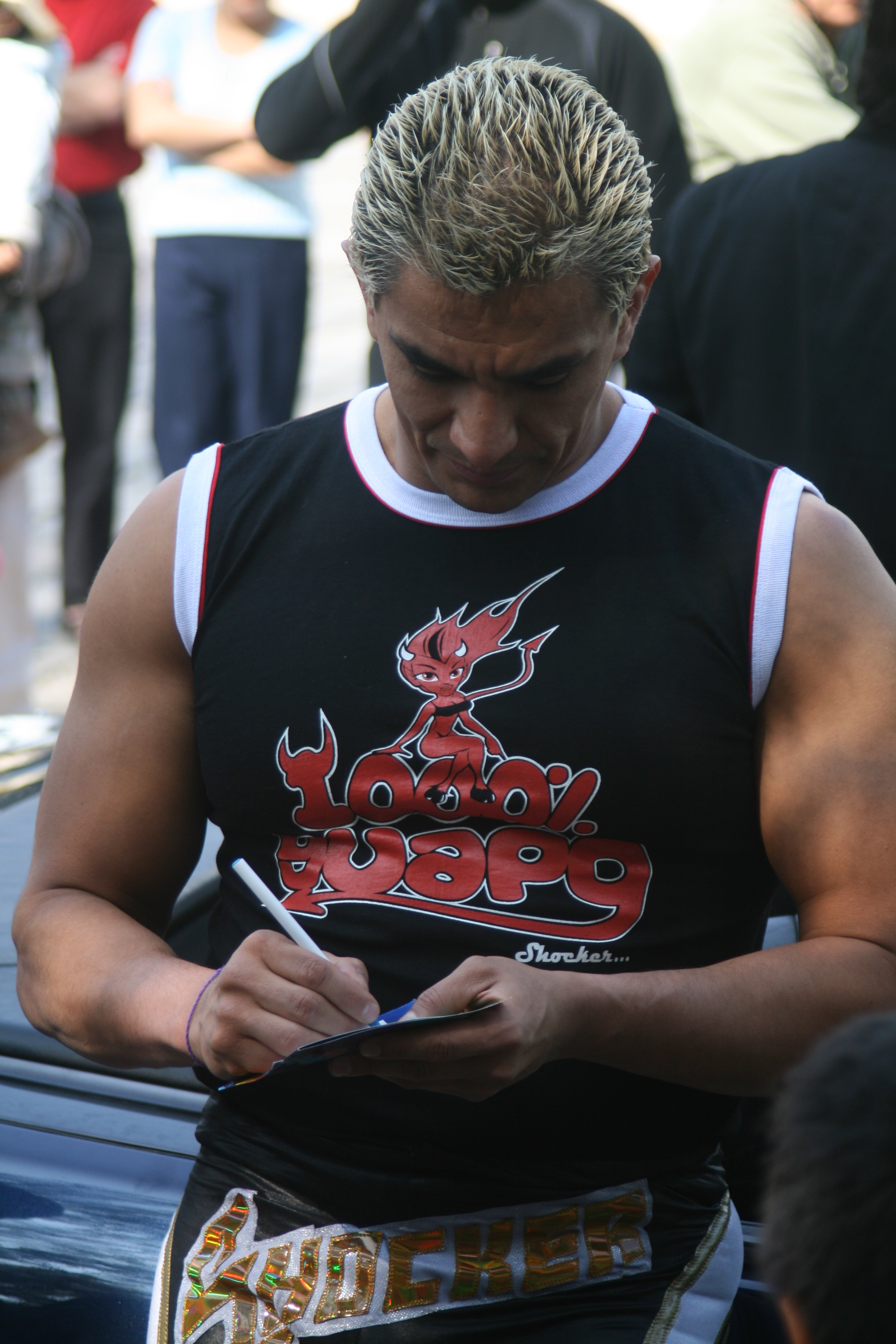
- Shocker, defended the CMLL World Light Heavyweight Championship on the show.
- Promotion: Consejo Mundial de Lucha Libre
- Date: December 13, 2002
- City: Mexico City, Mexico
- Venue: Arena México

Pay-per-view chronology
← Previous; CMLL 69th Anniversary Show	Next → Torneo Gran Alternativa

Sin Piedad chronology
← Previous; 2001	Next → 2003

Sin Piedad (2002) (Spanish for "No Mercy") was an annual professional wrestling major event produced by Consejo Mundial de Lucha Libre (CMLL), which took place on December 13, 2002 in Arena México, Mexico City, Mexico and replaced CMLL's regular Friday night show Super Viernes ("Super Friday"). The 2002 Sin Piedad was the third event under that name that CMLL promoted as their last major show of the year, always held in December. The main event was a traditional two-out-of-three falls Lucha de Apuestas, or bet match between Rey Bucanero and Vampiro Canadiense where both wrestlers risked their hair on the outcome of the match. The show also featured Shocker defending the CMLL World Light Heavyweight Championship against Último Guerrero and four additional matches.

== Production ==
=== Background ===
The Mexican wrestling company Consejo Mundial de Lucha Libre (Spanish for "World Wrestling Council"; CMLL) has held a number of major shows over the years using the moniker Sin Piedad ("No Pity" or "No Mercy"). CMLL has intermittently held a show billed specifically as Sin Piedad since 2000, primarily using the name for their "end of the year" show in December, although once they held a Sin Piedad show in August as well. CMLL has on occasion used a different name for the end-of-year show but Sin Piedad is the most commonly used name. All Sin Piedad shows have been held in Arena México in Mexico City, Mexico which is CMLL's main venue, its "home". Traditionally CMLL holds their major events on Friday Nights, which means the Sin Piedad shows replaced their regularly scheduled Super Viernes show. The 2002 Sin Piedad show was the third show to use the name.

=== Storylines ===
The event featured six professional wrestling matches with different wrestlers involved in pre-existing scripted feuds, plots and storylines. Wrestlers were portrayed as either heels (referred to as rudos in Mexico, those that portray the "bad guys") or faces (técnicos in Mexico, the "good guy" characters) as they followed a series of tension-building events, which culminated in a wrestling match or series of matches.

The main event and the semi-main event both stemmed from the same storyline, pitting the team of Los Guerreros del Infierno (Último Guerrero and Rey Bucanero) against the tecnico team of Shocker and Vampiro Canadiense. The storyline started not long after Guerrero and Bucanero defeated Negro Casas and El Hijo del Santo to win the CMLL World Tag Team Championship in mid-2002 and originally centered around Los Guerreros championship, with Shocker and Vampiro chasing the title. The two teams met in one of the feature matches at the CMLL 69th Anniversary Show where Los Guerreros successfully defended the tag team title. Following the title defense the storyline split into two, with Último Guerrero focusing on Shocker, demanding a match for Shocker's CMLL World Light Heavyweight Championship. In the other storyline the feud between Bucanero and Vampiro focused more on a Lucha de Apuestas or bet match challenge. Since neither held a singles championship they would both bet their hair against the outcome of the match and be shaved bald in case they lost. The Luchas de Apuestas match is the most prestigious match type in Lucha Libre, which is why it was chosen over the championship match to main event the show. In the semi-main event Último Guerrero won the CMLL World Light Heavyweight Championship after forcing Shocker to submit to his own trademark submission hold La Reienera (a Modified spinning backbreaker rack). In the main event Vampiro gained a measure of revenge for his tag team partner as he defeated Rey Bucanero, pinning him to win the third and deciding fall. Following the match Bucanero's long hair was cut off and then the rest of his hair was shaved off as per the Lucha Libre traditions.

== Aftermath ==
Sin Piedad marked the end of the storyline between Los Guerreros del Infierno and Shocker and Vampiro. Shocker moved on to create Los Guapos (The Hansome Ones) with Máscara Mágica and was actually on the opposite side of Vampiro in a match on CMLL's next major show, the 2003 Homenaje a Dos Leyendas ("Homage to two legends") show. Los Guerreros held the CMLL World Tag Team Championship until the end of 2003 where they were defeated by Shocker and his new partner L.A. Park Último Guerrero's reign as CMLL World Light Heavyweight Champion lasted 1,309 days, making him the longest reigning champion in the history of the title. He lost the title to Rey Bucanero on July 14, 2006.

Second match worker Genético would later be given a new wrestling mask and ring name, reborn as El Sagrado ("The Sacred One") in CMLL. Dr. X, Hooligan and Ramstein would all be part of the group Pandilla Guerrera ("Gang of Warriors") that was formed in 2005.

== Results ==
No.	Results	Stipulations
1	Bracito de Oro and Shockercito defeated Guerrerito del Futuro and La Sombrita	Best two-out-of-three falls six-man "Lucha Libre rules" tag team match
2	Genético, Marshall and Mr. Power defeated Doctor X and La Alianza (Hooligan and Ramstein)	Best two-out-of-three falls six-man "Lucha Libre rules" tag team match
3	Brazo de Plata, El Satánico and Pierroth Jr. defeated Apolo Dantés, Black Tiger and Giganté Silva	Best two-out-of-three falls six-man Relevos Increibles match
4	Atlantis, Black Warrior, Mr. Niebla and Super Crazy defeated Juventud Guerrera and Tokyo Gurentai (Mazada, Nosawa and Takemura)	Best two-out-of-three falls six-man "Lucha Libre rules" tag team match
5	Último Guerrero defeated Shocker (c)	Best two-out-of-three falls match for the CMLL World Light Heavyweight Championship
6	Vampiro Canadiense defeated Rey Bucanero	Best two-out-of-three falls Lucha de Apuesta hair vs. hair match
(c) / – the champion(s) heading into the match
