= Sin Piedad (2017) =

2017 Consejo Mundial de Lucha Libre event

- Official poster for the event
- Promotion: Consejo Mundial de Lucha Libre
- Date: January 1, 2017
- City: Mexico City, Mexico
- Venue: Arena México

Pay-per-view chronology
← Previous; Infierno en el Ring	Next → Fantastica Mania

Sin Piedad chronology
← Previous; 2016	Next → 2018

Sin Piedad (2017) (Spanish for "No Mercy") was a major professional wrestling event scripted and produced by the Mexican Lucha Libre promotion Consejo Mundial de Lucha Libre (CMLL), which took place on January 1, 2017 in Arena México, Mexico City, Mexico. The 2017 Sin Piedad was the 13th event under that name that CMLL has promoted since the first one was held in 2000, the second one to be held on New Year's Day.

In the main event of the show Máximo Sexy defeated lucha libre legend Máscara Año 2000 in a Lucha de Apuestas, or "bet match", and as a result Máscara Año 2000 was shaved bald after the match. The show featured three best two-out-of-three falls six-man "Lucha Libre rules" tag team matches and a tag team match for a total of five matches.

== Production ==
=== Background ===
The Mexican professional wrestling company Consejo Mundial de Lucha Libre (Spanish for "World Wrestling Council"; CMLL) has held a number of major shows over the years using the moniker Sin Piedad ("No Pity" or "No Mercy") for a major show intermittently since 2000. The name has primarily been used for CMLL's "end of the year" show in December with one exception when the show was held in August. CMLL has on occasion used a different name for the end-of-year show, but Sin Piedad is the most commonly used name. All Sin Piedad shows have been held in Arena México in Mexico City, Mexico which is CMLL's main venue, its home base and main venue. The 2017 Sin Piedad was the second time such a show under that name was held on New Year's Day.

Starting in 2011 through 2014 CMLL has been promoting a New Year's Day show with bigger, more prominent and promoted matches as part of the show although they did not specifically promote the shows under a special name, they were simply a special version of their weekly Saturday, Sunday, Tuesday and Wednesday shows that they hold in Arena Mexico on a regular basis. Starting in 2011 CMLL added at least one high-profile match to their shows, slowly building them into a special event. in 2011 the show featured the annual Reyes del Aire ("Kings of the Air") tournament, won by Ángel de Oro. In 2012 the January 1 show saw Hombre Bala Jr. and Super Halcón Jr. defeated the team known as Los Rayos Tapatío in a Luchas de Apuestas, masks vs masks match in what turned out to be Los Rayos last match in CMLL. The main event of the 2012 was the finals of a tournament for the vacant CMLL World Heavyweight Championship which was El Terrible defeat Rush 17th heavyweight champion. The 2013 start of the year show was highlighted first by then CMLL World Welterweight Champion Pólvora successfully defending against Titán and then the team of Boby Zavala and Disturbio defeated Leono and Tigre Blanco, forcing Leono and Blanco to have their hair shaved off as a result. The 2014 show, the last January 1 show without a specific title saw Super Halcón Jr. win that year's La Copa Junior tournament. Late in the show Mephisto defeated Atlantis to retain the Mexican National Light Heavyweight Championship in the main event. CMLL did not hold a show on January 1, 2015 but returned to the tradition in 2016 with Sin Piedad ("No Mercy"), that was streamed live online and later broadcast as part of CMLL's weekly television. the 2016 Sin Piedad featured two Luchas de Apuestas matches.

=== Storylines ===
The event featured five professional wrestling matches with different wrestlers involved in pre-existing scripted feuds, plots and storylines. Wrestlers were portrayed as either heels (referred to as rudos in Mexico, those that portray the "bad guys") or faces (técnicos in Mexico, the "good guy" characters) as they followed a series of tension-building events, which culminated in a wrestling match or series of matches.

== Results ==
No.	Results	Stipulations
1	Demus 3:16, Mercurio and Pierrothito defeated Acero, Astral, and Último Dragóncito	Best two-out-of-three falls six-man "Lucha Libre rules" tag team match
2	Ángel de Oro, Blue Panther Jr. and Guerrero Maya Jr. defeated Ripper and Los Revolucionarios del Terror (Boby Z and Pólvora)	Best two-out-of-three falls six-woman "Lucha Libre rules" tag team match
3	Atlantis, Marco Corleone and Stuka Jr. defeated La Peste Negra (El Felino, and Negro Casas) and Rey Bucanero)	Best two-out-of-three falls six-man "Lucha Libre rules" tag team match
4	Carístico, Valiente and Volador Jr. defeated Hechicero and Los Hijos del Averno (Ephesto and Mephisto	Best two-out-of-three falls six-man "Lucha Libre rules" tag team match
5	Máximo Sexy defeated Máscara Año 2000	Best two-out-of-three falls Lucha de Apuestas, hair vs. hair match

== See also ==
- 2017 in professional wrestling
