= Sin Piedad (2003) =

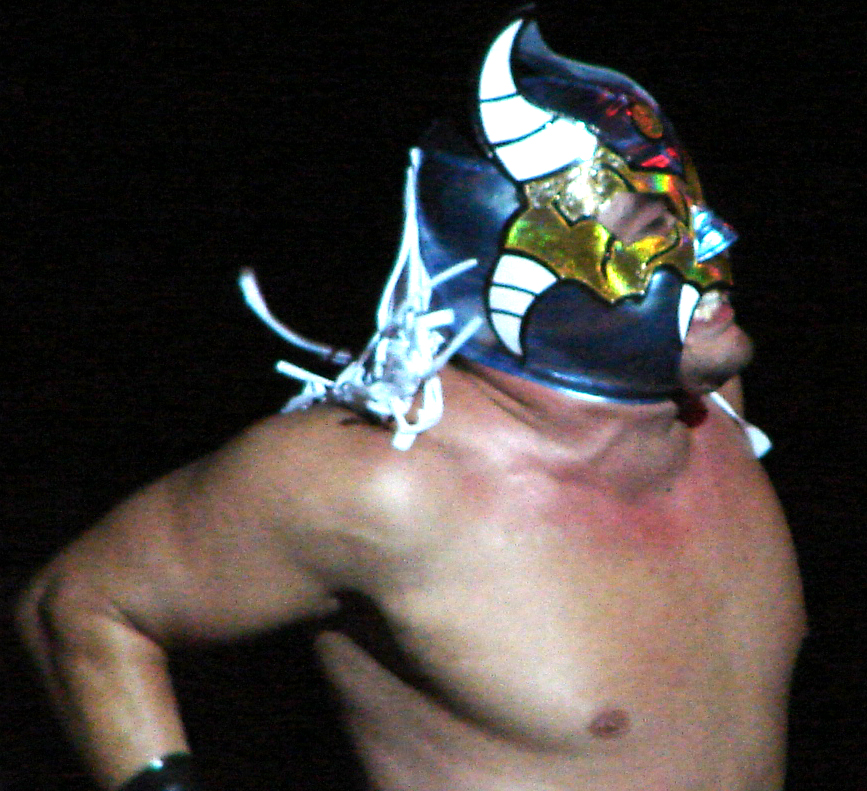
- Wrestler Averno, part of Los Nuevo Infernales and competed in the first match.
- Promotion: Consejo Mundial de Lucha Libre
- Date: December 5, 2003
- City: Mexico City, Mexico
- Venue: Arena México

Pay-per-view chronology
← Previous; CMLL 70th Anniversary Show	Next → Homenaje a Dos Leyendas

Sin Piedad chronology
← Previous; 2002	Next → 2004

Sin Piedad (2003) (Spanish for "No Mercy") was an annual professional wrestling major event produced by Consejo Mundial de Lucha Libre (CMLL), which took place on December 5, 2003 in Arena México, Mexico City, Mexico and replaced CMLL's regular Friday night show Super Viernes ("Super Friday"). The 2003 Sin Piedad was the fourth event under that name that CMLL promoted as their last major show of the year, always held in December. In the main event Universo 2000 risked his mask and Pierroth, Jr. risked his hair on the outcome of their Lucha de Apuestas (bet match). The undercard featured an additional Luchas de Apuestas match where both Ángel Azteca and Arkangel de la Muerte put their mask on the line, guaranteeing that one of them would be forced to unmask after the match. The show featured three additional matches including the tournament finals of a tournament for the vacant Mexican National Trios Championship. The event featured five professional wrestling matches with different wrestlers involved in pre-existing scripted feuds or storylines. Wrestlers portray either villains (referred to as "rudos" in Mexico) or fan favorites ("technicos" in Mexico) as they follow a series of tension-building events, which culminate in a wrestling match or series of matches.

== Production ==
=== Background ===
The Mexican wrestling company Consejo Mundial de Lucha Libre (Spanish for "World Wrestling Council"; CMLL) has held a number of major shows over the years using the moniker Sin Piedad ("No Pity" or "No Mercy"). CMLL has intermittently held a show billed specifically as Sin Piedad since 2000, primarily using the name for their "end of the year" show in December, although once they held a Sin Piedad show in August as well. CMLL has on occasion used a different name for the end-of-year show but Sin Piedad is the most commonly used name. All Sin Piedad shows have been held in Arena México in Mexico City, Mexico which is CMLL's main venue, its "home". Traditionally CMLL holds their major events on Friday Nights, which means the Sin Piedad shows replace their regularly scheduled Super Viernes show. The 2003 Sin Piedad show was the fourth show to use the name.

=== Storylines ===
The event featured five professional wrestling matches with different wrestlers involved in pre-existing scripted feuds, plots and storylines. Wrestlers were portrayed as either heels (referred to as rudos in Mexico, those that portray the "bad guys") or faces (técnicos in Mexico, the "good guy" characters) as they followed a series of tension-building events, which culminated in a wrestling match or series of matches.

== Results ==
No.	Results	Stipulations
1	Los Nuevo Infernales (Averno, Mephisto and El Satánico) defeated The Havana Pitbulls (Havana Brother I, Havana Brother II and Havana Brother III)	Best two-out-of-three falls six-man "Lucha Libre rules" tag team match
2	Black Warrior, Dr. Wagner Jr., Fuerza Guerrera and Perro Aguayo Jr. defeated Atlantis, Shocker, Super Parka and Vampiro Canadiense	Best two-out-of-three falls eight-man "Lucha Libre rules" tag team match
3	Arkangel de la Muerte defeated Ángel Azteca	Best two-out-of-three falls Lucha de Apuestas mask vs. mask match
4	El Felino, Safari and Volador Jr. defeated Alan Stone, Super Crazy and Zumbido	Best two-out-of-three falls six-man "Lucha Libre rules" tag team match, tournament finals for the vacant Mexican National Trios Championship
5	Universo 2000 defeated Pierroth Jr.	Best two-out-of-three falls Lucha de Apuesta hair vs. hair match
