= Sin Piedad (2018) =

2018 Mexican professional wrestling supercard show

- Official poster for the event
- Promotion: Consejo Mundial de Lucha Libre
- Date: January 1, 2018
- City: Mexico City, Mexico
- Venue: Arena México

Pay-per-view chronology
← Previous; Sin Salida	Next → Fantastica Mania

Sin Piedad chronology
← Previous; 2017	Next → 2019

Sin Piedad (2018) (Spanish for "No Mercy") was a major professional wrestling event produced by the Mexican Lucha Libre promotion Consejo Mundial de Lucha Libre (CMLL). The Sin Piedad show took place on January 1, 2018 in Arena México, Mexico City, Mexico. The 2018 Sin Piedad was the 14th event under the Sin Piedad name and the third year in a row CMLL has held the show on New Year's Day.

The main event was a traditional Lucha de Apuestas, or "bet match", where long time rivals Sam Adonis and Negro Casas put their hair on the line. When Casas won the third and deciding fall Adonis was forced to have all his hair shaved off. The undercard featured five additional matches, four best two-out-of-three falls six-man "Lucha Libre rules" tag team match and one Best two-out-of-three falls tag team match

== Production ==
=== Background ===
The Mexican wrestling company Consejo Mundial de Lucha Libre (Spanish for "World Wrestling Council"; CMLL) has held a number of major shows over the years using the moniker Sin Piedad ("No Pity" or "No Mercy"). CMLL has intermittently held a show billed specifically as Sin Piedad since 2000, primarily using the name for their "end of the year" show in December, although once they held a Sin Piedad show in August as well. CMLL has on occasion used a different name for the end-of-year show but Sin Piedad is the most commonly used name. All Sin Piedad shows have been held in Arena México in Mexico City, Mexico which is CMLL's main venue, its "home". The 2018 Sin Piedad was the third first show to be held on New Year's Day after being held on the same day in 2016 and 2017.

Starting in 2011 CMLL has been promoting a New Year's Day show with bigger, more prominent and promoted matches, although they did not specifically promote the shows under a special event name, they were simply a special version of their weekly Arena Mexico shows. Starting in 2011 CMLL added at least one high profile match to their shows, slowly building them into a special event. in 2011 the show featured the annual Reyes del Aire ("Kings of the Air") tournament, won by Ángel de Oro. In 2012 the January 1 show saw Hombre Bala Jr. and Super Halcón Jr. defeated the team known as Los Rayos Tapatío in a Luchas de Apuestas, masks vs masks match in what turned out to be Los Rayos last match in CMLL. The main event of the 2012 was the finals of a tournament for the vacant CMLL World Heavyweight Championship which was El Terrible defeat Rush 17th heavyweight champion. The 2013 start of the year show was highlighted first by then CMLL World Welterweight Champion Pólvora successfully defending against Titán and then the team of Boby Zavala and Disturbio defeated Leono and Tigre Blanco, forcing Leono and Blanco to have their hair shaved off as a result. The 2014 show, the last January 1 show without a specific title saw Super Halcón Jr. win that year's La Copa Junior tournament. Late in the show Mephisto defeated Atlantis to retain the Mexican National Light Heavyweight Championship in the main event. CMLL did not hold a show on January 1, 2015.

=== Storylines ===
The event featured six professional wrestling matches with different wrestlers involved in pre-existing scripted feuds, plots and storylines. Wrestlers were portrayed as either heels (referred to as rudos in Mexico, those that portray the "bad guys") or faces (técnicos in Mexico, the "good guy" characters) as they followed a series of tension-building events, which culminated in a wrestling match or series of matches.

== Results ==
No.	Results	Stipulations	Times
1	Eléctrico and Último Dragoncito defeated Mercurio and Pequeño Olímpico	Best two-out-of-three falls tag team match	12:05
2	Oro Jr., Star Jr. and Starman defeated Los Cancerberos del Infierno (Cancerbero and Raziel) and El Hijo del Signo by disqualification	Best two-out-of-three falls six-man "Lucha Libre rules" tag team match	11:40
3	Blue Panther Jr., Pegasso and The Panther defeated Nitro, Sagrado and Virus	Best two-out-of-three falls six-man "Lucha Libre rules" tag team match	14:35
4	Mr. Niebla, Shocker and Vangellys defeated Esfinge, Titán and Drone	Best two-out-of-three falls six-man "Lucha Libre rules" tag team match	10:35
5	Ángel de Oro, Niebla Roja and Valiente defeated Nueva Generación Dinamita (El Cuatrero, Forastero and Sansón)	Best two-out-of-three falls six-man "Lucha Libre rules" tag team match	13:20
6	Negro Casas (with Dalys la Caribeña) defeated Sam Adonis (with Okumura)	Best two-out-of-three falls Lucha de Apuestas, hair vs. hair match	12:40
