= Sin Piedad (2006) =

Mexican professional wrestling supercard show

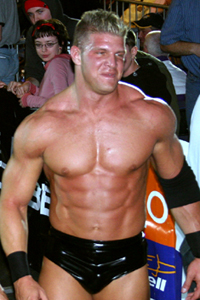
- Marco Corleone, along with Kenzo Suzuki, lost the main event match.
- Promotion: Consejo Mundial de Lucha Libre
- Date: December 15, 2006 (aired December 15, 2006 on pay-per-view)
- City: Mexico City, Mexico
- Venue: Arena México
- Attendance: 10,500

Pay-per-view chronology
← Previous; Leyenda de Azul	Next → Reyes del Aire

Sin Piedad chronology
← Previous; 2004	Next → 2007

Sin Piedad (2006) (Spanish for "No Mercy") was a professional wrestling pay-per-view (PPV) produced by Consejo Mundial de Lucha Libre (CMLL), which took place on December 15, 2006 in Arena México, Mexico City, Mexico. The 2006 Sin Piedad was the fifth event under that name that CMLL promoted as their last major show of the year, always held in December. The main event was tag team Lucha de Apuestas, hair vs. hair match with the team of Kenzo Suzuki and Marco Corleone going up against Universo 2000 and Shocker. The show also featured a six-man "Lucha Libre rules" tag team match for the CMLL World Trios Championship where champions Los Guerreros del Infierno (Atlantis, Tarzan Boy and Último Guerrero defended against Los Perros del Mal (Damián 666, Halloween and Héctor Garza). The show featured three additional trios matches and a tag team match.

== Production ==
=== Background ===
The Mexican wrestling company Consejo Mundial de Lucha Libre (Spanish for "World Wrestling Council"; CMLL) has held a number of major shows over the years using the moniker Sin Piedad ("No Pity" or "No Mercy"). CMLL has intermittently held a show billed specifically as Sin Piedad since 2000, primarily using the name for their "end of the year" show in December, although once they held a Sin Piedad show in August as well. CMLL has on occasion used a different name for the end-of-year show but Sin Piedad is the most commonly used name. All Sin Piedad shows have been held in Arena México in Mexico City, Mexico which is CMLL's main venue, its "home". Traditionally CMLL holds their major events on Friday Nights, which means the Sin Piedad shows replace their regularly scheduled Super Viernes show. The 2006 Sin Piedad show was the sixth show to use the name.

=== Storylines ===
The event featured six professional wrestling matches with different wrestlers involved in pre-existing scripted feuds, plots and storylines. Wrestlers were portrayed as either heels (referred to as rudos in Mexico, those that portray the "bad guys") or faces (técnicos in Mexico, the "good guy" characters) as they followed a series of tension-building events, which culminated in a wrestling match or series of matches.

The main event of the 2006 Sin Piedad event went through various possibilities before settling on the final match announced only weeks before the show. The first hinted main event was a Lucha de Apuestas (bet match) between the tecnico enmascarado (masked) Dos Caras Jr. and the rudo Marco Corleone. The first hints of a rivalry that would warrant a Luchas de Apuesta between the two came at the CMLL 73rd Anniversary Show on September 29, 2006 where Dos Caras Jr. teamed up with Blue Panther and Rey Bucanero to defeat Corleone, his regular tag team partner Kenzo Suzuki and Olímpico. Several matches following the 73rd Anniversary show had Dos Caras and Corleone on opposite sides, but the rivalry never really escalated between the two. Following the 73rd Anniversary show Shocker turned tecnico and began teaming with Rey Bucanero on a regular basis, with a storyline against Marco Corleone and Kenzo Suzuki being developed for CMLL's December pay-per-view event. In October problems between Suzuki and fellow rudo Universo 2000 after Suzuki cost his team the win by disqualification, causing Universo 2000 to attack Suzuki after the match. Following the turn Universo would frequently team with both Shocker and Rey Bucanero against Corleone, Suzuki and various partners. At one point Shocker and Bucanero even made a Luchas de Apuesta challenge, but Corleone and Suzuki both pretended to not understand a single work of Spanish and thus ignored the challenge, further enraging CMLL's fans. A few weeks later Suzuki and Corleone attacked Universo with Suzuki applying the "Black Hammer" (a Piledriver), a move that Universo 2000 himself has used on several occasions to hurt his opponents. In Lucha Libre the Piledriver move is considered both illegal and very damaging, with the recipient usually "selling" the move as if it had injured his neck. Following the attack it became more and more clear that the actual main event for Sin Piedad would be Universo 2000 and Shocker taking on Marco Corleone and Kenzo Suzuki with both teams betting their hair on the outcome of the match. The Sin Piedad was originally scheduled for December 1, 2006 but during a CMLL Super Viernes event Universo 2000 hit Marco Corleone in the head with a steel chair as Corleone was executing a dive out of the ring. The blow cut Corleone open, causing him to be taken to the back and given several stitches. Following the attack it was announced that due to the "heinous attack" the match between the two teams had to be postponed until December 15 to allow Corleone to recover. Since the attack and the injury were both only storylines the real reason for the postponement is not clear, although it could have been another storyline device to underline the animosity between the two teams.

The semi-final match of the night was a continuation of the storyline between the two rudo factions (also called stables) Los Perros del Mal ("The Bad Dogs") and Los Guerreros del Infierno ("The Soldiers from the Inferno") that had been going on since the inception of Los Perros a couple of years prior. The Los Guerreros team of Atlantis, Tarzan Boy and Último Guerrero faced and defeated the Los Perros team of Perro Aguayo Jr., Héctor Garza and Shocker at the CMLL 73rd Anniversary Show to win the vacant CMLL World Trios Championship. Part of the reason Los Guerreros del Infierno won the tournament final was due to Shocker turning on Los Perros, causing Los Perros to demand a rematch for the championship. CMLL agreed and booked the champions to face Los Perros representatives Héctor Garza, Damián 666 and Halloween at the Sin Piedad event. The fourth match of the night would be the in-ring debut of the ring character Ephesto, who would team up with Averno and Mephisto to form a trio called La Triada del Terror ("The Triangle of Terror"). While Ephesto was a new character in CMLL the man under the mask had been with CMLL in the early 1990s under the ring name Pantera del Ring, and later on as Safari and Hombre Sin Nombre ("Man with no name") until CMLL decided to given him a new ring character and mask to team him up with Averno and Mephisto. Their opponents for the match were the then reigning CMLL World Tag Team Champion Místico, who along with co-champion Negro Casas had defended the title against Averno and Mephisto at least once before. Místico would be joined by Último Dragón and Volador Jr. for the match. Both wrestlers had worked extensively with Averno and Mephisto and both had aspirations for Averno's CMLL World Middleweight Championship.

The second match of the night featured no active storylines between the members of each team, although tecnico Dr. Wagner Jr. and rudo L.A. Park had a long running on-again-off-again storyline that actually continued for years after the Sin Pidad event. Dr. Wagner Jr. would team up with Dos Caras Jr. and Rey Bucanero to take on L.A. Park and Los Guerreros del Infierno representatives Eclipse and Olímpico in a traditional Six-man "Lucha Libre rules" tag team match. The driving storyline behind the second match centered around the CMLL World Women's Championship that had seen champion Hiroka wart off challenger Dark Angel's advances several times over the last couple of months. Curiously the match did not include Lady Apache who had already been announced as challenging for the title only 10 days after Sin Piedad. The rudo champion Hiroka would team up with La Amapola and the masked Princesa Sujei to take on Dark Angel, Marcela, and Sahori in the second match of the night. The opening match of the show featured the Arena México debut of Flash as he teamed up with fellow tecnico and Super Nova to face the tag team of Artillero and Súper Comando, collectively known as Los Hombres del Camoflaje ("Men in Camouflage). For CMLL wrestlers working in Arena Mexico means that they are working on at the highest level of CMLL, especially if they work on Friday nights, where CMLL holds their most important shows CMLL Super Viernes or their major annual shows. The Sin Piedad show would be Flash's first opportunity to showcase his wrestling skills in front of CMLL's "hometown crowd".

== Event ==
The Sin Piedad event drew about a half full Arena Mexico, with the official attendance of 10,500, which caused CMLL to darken out the upper portion of the balcony section, something they had not had to do for a major event in several months. In the opening match of the show young technico Flash made his Arena Mexico debut, teaming with fellow young technico Super Nova to face off against Los Hombres del Camoflaje, Artillero and Súper Comando, two masked rudos who both have military themed masks and ring characters. The third and final fall went to the tecnico team, winning by disqualification when Artillero pulled Flash's mask off after brutalizing the young rookie for several minutes. The action of the second match suffered from La Amapola hurting her hip during the match and had to be removed from the ring, forcing the officials to shorten the match to a single fall. In the end the tecnico team of Dark Angel, Marcela and Sahori won the fall in 12 minutes and six seconds. The third match of the night was also the first proper best two-out-of-three falls six-man tag team match, the most common match type in CMLL. The match saw team captain Dr. Wagner Jr. team up with Dos Caras Jr. and Rey Bucanero defeating the team of L.A. Park and Los Guerreros team members Eclipse and Olímpico in three falls, ending the match after 13 minutes and five seconds when Dr. Wagner pinned Eclipse after using his "Dr. Wagner Driver" (Sitout scoop slam piledriver) finishing move and moments later Rey Bucanero pinned Olímpico to take the match for their side.

The fourth match of the night featured one of the most well known Luchadors, Japanese Último Dragón teaming with a wrestler who was quickly becoming one of the most popular tecnicos in Místico as well as the high-flying Volador Jr. The team took on the newly formed La Triada del Terror where Averno and Mephisto teamed up with Ephesto, a character who made his wrestling debut that night. The first fall went to the rudo Triadas when Mephisto pinned Último Dragón and Ephesto pinned Místico after six minutes and nine seconds of wrestling. The second fall belonged to the tecnico team as Místico pinned team captain Averno to win the match at the 11:52 mark. The third and final fall went to the tecnico team as Místico pinned Mephisto after nineteen-and-a-half minutes, winning the match two to one. Following the match Volador Jr. made a challenge to Averno, wanting him to put the CMLL World Middleweight Championship on the line against him. In the fifth match of the night Los Guerreros del Infierno defended the CMLL World Trios Championship against Los Perros del Mal as Atlantis, Tarzan Boy and Último Guerrero took on Damián 666, Halloween and Héctor Garza. In the first fall Tarzan Boy and Atlantis applied a double submission hold on Damián 666 and Halloween, forcing them to submit only two minutes and eleven seconds into the match. In the second fall all three Los Perros suplexed their opponents into pinning predicaments, pinning all three of their opponents after an additional two minutes and forty seconds of wrestling. In the third fall, after just under ten minutes of total action Atlantis forced Garza to submit, following by Último Guerrero applied a submission hold on Damián 666, forcing him to give up as well for a successful title defense. The match was the shortest match of the night.

The "Imperial Eagle" (Kenzo Suzuki) and the "Italian Eagle" (Marco Corleone) were accompanied by CMLL Luchadora Mima Shimoda to the right for the main event match. During the early parts of the match the crowd would actually cheer for the rudo team at times, especially Marco Corleone, choosing to side with him instead of the recently turned Universo 2000 and Shocker who had not done a lot to earn the crowd's respect leading up to the match. Shocker pinned Corleone after just over four minutes of wrestling, putting his team up by a point. The second fall is about the length of the first one, approximately four minutes and saw the rudo team of Corleone and Suzuki win after Corleone executed a "Superman Flight", one of his signature high flying moves off the top rope, and pinned Unverso 2000. With the match tied the third fall, both teams took more chances, including Corleone getting caught up on the ropes during one of his leaps out of the ring. The match saw Universo 2000 pin Kenzo Suzuki, followed by Marco Corleone pinning Universo 2000, leaving only himself and Shocker as the legal men in the match. When the referee turned his back Universo 2000 landed a low-blow on Marco Corleone, making it easy for Shocker to pin him for the third and deciding fall. After the match both Corleone and Suzuki stood in the middle of the ring while the designated barber cut their hair off and then shaved them completely bald to fulfill the Luchas de Apuestas stipulation.

== Aftermath ==
Kenzo Suzuki only wrestled one more match for CMLL after losing his hair, showing off his bald head two weeks later on the December 29, 2006 Super Viernes where he teamed with El Terrible and Pierroth Jr. as the team lost to Dos Caras Jr., Lizmark Jr. and Rey Bucanero. While Suzuki left the promotion Corleone would continue to work for CMLL for a while, turning tecnico later on, partially due to the positive response of the Arena Mexico crowd. Shocker and Universo 2000 did not team up after the Sin Piedad victory. Los Guerreros del Infierno would hold the CMLL World Trios Championship to the Los Perros del Mal team of Perro Aguayo Jr., Mr. Águila and Héctor Garza. The Hiroka/Dark Angel storyline was ended without a proper resolution as Hiroka lost the CMLL World Women's Championship to Lady Apache only 10 days after the event.

== Results ==
No.	Results	Stipulations	Times
1	Flash and Super Nova defeated Los Hombres del Camoflaje (Artillero and Súper Comando) by disqualification	Best two-out-of-three falls Tag team match	14:01
2	Dark Angel, Marcela, and Sahori defeated La Amapola, Hiroka, and Princesa Sujei	Best two-out-of-three falls six-woman "Lucha Libre rules" tag team match	12:06
3	Dos Caras Jr., Dr. Wagner Jr. and Rey Bucanero defeated L.A. Park and Los Guerreros del Infierno (Eclipse and Olímpico)	Best two-out-of-three falls six-man "Lucha Libre rules" tag team match	13:05
4	Místico, Último Dragón and Volador Jr. defeated La Triada del Terror (Averno, Ephesto and Mephisto)	Best two-out-of-three falls six-man "Lucha Libre rules" tag team match	19:30
5	Los Guerreros del Infierno (Atlantis, Tarzan Boy and Último Guerrero) (c) defeated Los Perros del Mal (Damián 666, Halloween and Héctor Garza)	Best two-out-of-three falls six-man "Lucha Libre rules" tag team match	09:58
6	Shocker and Universo 2000 defeated Kenzo Suzuki and Marco Corleone	Best two-out-of-three falls Tag Team Lucha de Apuestas, hair vs. hair match.	16:34
(c) / – the champion(s) heading into the match
