= Sin Piedad (2001) =

Mexican professional wrestling supercard show

- Promotion: Consejo Mundial de Lucha Libre
- Date: December 14, 2001
- City: Mexico City, Mexico
- Venue: Arena México
- Attendance: 10,900

Pay-per-view chronology
← Previous; Leyenda de Plata	Next → Copa de Arena Mexico

Sin Piedad chronology
← Previous; 2000	Next → 2002

Sin Piedad (2001) (Spanish for "No Mercy") was a professional wrestling Pay-Per-View (PPV) produced by Consejo Mundial de Lucha Libre (CMLL), which took place on December 14, 2001 in Arena México, Mexico City, Mexico. The 2001 Sin Piedad was the second event under that name that CMLL promoted as their last major show of the year, always held in December. The main event was a Lucha de Apuestas, hair vs. hair match between Shocker and Emilio Charles Jr. The show featured a further Lucha de Apuesta match on the undercard, pitting Tarzan Boy against Brazo de Plata. The show featured four additional matches, three six-man "Lucha Libre rules" tag team matches and an eight-man Atómicos match that featured Rey Misterio Jr. between his time in World Championship Wrestling and World Wrestling Entertainment.

== Production ==
=== Background ===
The Mexican wrestling company Consejo Mundial de Lucha Libre (Spanish for "World Wrestling Council"; CMLL) has held a number of major shows over the years using the moniker Sin Piedad ("No Pity" or "No Mercy"). CMLL has intermittently held a show billed specifically as Sin Piedad since 2000, primarily using the name for their "end of the year" show in December, although once they held a Sin Piedad show in August as well. CMLL has on occasion used a different name for the end-of-year show but Sin Piedad is the most commonly used name. All Sin Piedad shows have been held in Arena México in Mexico City, Mexico which is CMLL's main venue, its "home". Traditionally CMLL holds their major events on Friday Nights, which means the Sin Piedad shows replace their regularly scheduled Super Viernes show. The 2001 Sin Piedad show was the second show to use the name.

=== Storylines ===
The event featured six professional wrestling matches with different wrestlers involved in pre-existing scripted feuds, plots and storylines. Wrestlers were portrayed as either heels (referred to as rudos in Mexico, those that portray the "bad guys") or faces (técnicos in Mexico, the "good guy" characters) as they followed a series of tension-building events, which culminated in a wrestling match or series of matches.

In mid-2000 Shocker, Bestia Salvaje and Scorpio Jr. teamed up in Consejo Mundial de Lucha Libre (CMLL) to form a group called Los Guapos (The Hansome Ones"). The Los Guapos concept presented all three wrestlers as vain, selffocused bordering on narcissistic metrosexual wrestlers who were almost more concerned with their looks, bleached hair etc. than anything else. The group took part in a large number of vignettes with them visiting beauty spas and talking about their looks, which played for comedic value, especially considering none of the wrestlers were considered "classically beautiful", in fact Scorpio, Jr's father was nicknamed El Rey Feo ("The Ugly King") and the son took after his father. In mid-2001 both Scorpio Jr. and Salvaje wanted to bring in their long time friend and partner Emilio Charles Jr. to the group, which Shocker opposed on the ground that Charles Jr. was simply "too ugly". Even after attempts at a "make over" Shocker still opposed the inclusion. in the fall Los Guapos turned on Shocker, and the three Nuevo Guapos attacked Shocker during and after several matches. In the end Shocker and Emilio Charles Jr. agreed to a Lucha de Apuesta or "bet match" where both wrestlers would put their hair on the line against the outcome of the match. The Luchas de Apuestas match is the ultimate "storyline settler" in Lucha Libre and would also determine which side would be the true Los Guapos.

In the fall of 2001, Tarzan Boy found himself on the opposite side of both Brazo de Plata and Giganté Silva in a number of handicap matches. The matches often saw Brazo de Plata and Giganté Silva take on more wrestlers since Silva towered at 2.12 m (6 ft 11 1/2 in) and to some extent was counted as two people. During a number of television vignettes the very physically fit Tarzan Boy would mock both Silva and Brazo de Plata for their physiques, Silva was very tall, but skinny for his size, while Brazo de Pata was severely overweight. After growing tired of the comments, Brazo de Plata challenged Tarzan Boy to put his hair on the line in a Luchas de Apuestas match and prove he was the better man.

== Event ==
In the opening match the Los Boriquas (The Puerto Ricans) team of Veneno and El Hijo de Pierroth teamed up with Doctor X to take on the young tecnico team of Tony Rivera, Tigre Blanco and Volador Jr. in a six-man "Lucha Libre rules" tag team match. Los Boriquas won both the first and the third fall of the match to win the first match. In the second match the makeshift tecnico trio of Olímpico, Safari and Mr. Niebla teamed up to take on the latest incarnation of Los Infernales, led by captain and leader El Satánico, joining forces with Averno and Mephisto for the match. The third and final fall saw El Satánico pin Mr. Niebla, ending the match after twelve minutes and six seconds.

In the third match of the night the tecnico team of Atlantis and Rayo de Jalisco Jr., teaming up with Lizmark Jr., son of Lizmark that the Atlantis and Rayo de Jalisco Jr. teamed up with in the past. The popular trio faced off against Los Hermanos Dinamita ("The Dynamite Brothers"; real life brothers Universo 2000 and Máscara Año 2000) who teamed up with second-generation wrestler Dr. Wagner Jr. for the match. All three falls took place in the span of 13 minutes and five seconds, with team captain Atlantis winning the third and deciding fall for his side. The fourth match of the night was also the first featured match as rivals, the jovial popular Brazo de Plata ("Silver Arm") took on the arrogant, hated Tarzan Boy in a match where the loser would be shaved bald after the match. The popular Brazo de Plata, affectionately known as "Super Porky", used his weight to win the first fall. An irate Tarzan Boy quickly won the second fall to even the score, then went on to a long, intense third fall between the two, highlighting the contrasting styles between the two wrestlers. The final fall lasted almost three times as long as the first two falls combine, ending after nineteen and a half minutes with Tarzan Boy earning a very unpopular victory. Following the match Brazo de Plata had all his hair shaved off as per the Luchas de Apuestas stipulation.

The regular group La Familia de Tijuana ("The Family from Tijuana"), consisting of Nicho el Millonario, Juventud Guerrera, Halloween and Damián 666 competed in the fifth and semi-final match of the night. The four had originally started working together in World Championship Wrestling (WCW) and continued to do so in CMLL under the La Familia name. The rudo Familia took on the tecnico team of some of the most popular names in CMLL at the time, El Hijo del Santo and Negro Casas teamed up with Rey Misterio Jr. who made a special appearance in CMLL between working for WCW and starting for World Wrestling Entertainment (WWE). The team was rounded out by El Hombre Sin Nombre ("The Man with no name"), formerly known as Hijo del Rayo de Jalisco or Rayo de Jalisco III, but had been forced to give up the name and worked "Without a name". The experience and team work of La Familia proved too much even for the all-start tecnico team as La Familia won two of the three falls in just under ten minutes.

The final match of the night had both Shocker and Emilio Charles Jr. both put their hair on the line on the outcome of the match as well as the "ownership" of the Los Guapos group name as well. Guapo founder Shocker lost the first fall to Guapo usurper Emilio Charles Jr. putting him behind from the beginning. Shocker fought back and showed Charles that Shocker was just as capable of cheating and using underhanded tactics, even if he was not a tecnico after the other Guapos had turned on him, taking the second fall. The third fall of the match saw the advantage change from moment to moment as neither man dominated, but in the end Shocker took advantage of a miscommunication between Charles as Bestia Salvaje and Scorpio Jr. who tried to interfere in the match and pinned Emilio Charles Jr. for the third and final fall. After the match Charles' long, bleached hair was clipped off, then the rest of his hair was shaved completely off.

== Aftermath ==
Following his victory Shocker would reform Los Guapos in 2002 when he teamed up with Máscara Mágica and later on El Terrible as well. Bestia Salvaje, Scorpio Jr. and Emilio Charles Jr. formed their own trio under the name Los Talibanes ("the Taliban") to continue the feud with Los Guapos.

== Results ==
No.	Results	Stipulations	Times
1	Veneno, El Hijo de Pierroth and Doctor X defeated Tony Rivera, Tigre Blanco and Volador Jr.	Best two-out-of-three falls six-man "Lucha Libre rules" tag team match	—
2	Los Infernales (El Satánico, Averno and Mephisto) defeated Olímpico, Safari and Mr. Niebla	Best two-out-of-three falls six-man "Lucha Libre rules" tag team match	12:06
3	Atlantis, Rayo de Jalisco Jr. and Lizmark Jr. defeated Los Hermanos Dinamita (Universo 2000 and Máscara Año 2000) and Dr. Wagner Jr.	Best two-out-of-three falls six-man "Lucha Libre rules" tag team match	13:05
4	Tarzan Boy defeated Brazo de Plata	Best two-out-of three falls Lucha de Apuestas, hair vs. hair match.	19:30
5	La Familia de Tijuana (Nicho el Millonario, Juventud Guerrera, Halloween and Damián 666) defeated El Hijo del Santo, El Hombre Sin Nombre, Negro Casas and Rey Misterio Jr.	Best two-out-of-three falls eight-man "Lucha Libre rules" tag team match	09:58
6	Shocker defeated Emilio Charles Jr.	Best two-out-of three falls Lucha de Apuesta, hair vs. hair match	16:34
