= Sin Piedad (2004) =

Mexican professional wrestling supercard show

- Promotion: Consejo Mundial de Lucha Libre
- Date: December 17, 2004
- City: Mexico City, Mexico
- Venue: Arena México

Pay-per-view chronology
← Previous; Leyenda de Azul	Next → La Copa Junior

Sin Piedad chronology
← Previous; 2003	Next → 2006

Sin Piedad (2004) (Spanish for "No Mercy") was an annual professional wrestling major event produced by Consejo Mundial de Lucha Libre (CMLL), which took place on December 17, 2004 in Arena México, Mexico City, Mexico and replaced CMLL's regular Friday night show Super Viernes ("Super Friday"). The 2004 Sin Piedad was the fifth event under that name that CMLL promoted as their last major show of the year, always held in December. The main event of the show was a tag team Lucha de Apuestas ("bet match") between the team of Pierroth and Vampiro Canadiense and Los Hermanos Dinamita (Cien Caras and Máscara Año 2000). Both teams risked their hair on the outcome of the match, with the losing team being shaved totally bald after the match. The show included five additional matches, including a match for the Mexican National Trios Championship.

== Production ==
=== Background ===
The Mexican wrestling company Consejo Mundial de Lucha Libre (Spanish for "World Wrestling Council"; CMLL) has held a number of major shows over the years using the moniker Sin Piedad ("No Pity" or "No Mercy"). CMLL has intermittently held a show billed specifically as Sin Piedad since 2000, primarily using the name for their "end of the year" show in December, although once they held a Sin Piedad show in August as well. CMLL has on occasion used a different name for the end-of-year show but Sin Piedad is the most commonly used name. All Sin Piedad shows have been held in Arena México in Mexico City, Mexico which is CMLL's main venue, its "home". Traditionally CMLL holds their major events on Friday Nights, which means the Sin Piedad shows replace their regularly scheduled Super Viernes show. The 2004 Sin Piedad show was the fifth show to use the name.

=== Storylines ===
The event featured six professional wrestling matches with different wrestlers involved in pre-existing scripted feuds, plots and storylines. Wrestlers were portrayed as either heels (referred to as rudos in Mexico, those that portray the "bad guys") or faces (técnicos in Mexico, the "good guy" characters) as they followed a series of tension-building events, which culminated in a wrestling match or series of matches.

One of the driving storylines in Consejo Mundial de Lucha Libre (CMLL) in 2004 was the formation of the group called La Furia del Norte ("The Northern Fury"). La Furia del Norte was directly or indirectly involved in the top three matches on the show including both the main event and the semi-main event. The group was created in mid-2004 when the rudo trio of Pierroth, Vampiro Canadiense and Tarzan Boy working against the tecnico team of Negro Casas, Shocker and Perro Aguayo Jr. The two groups were involved in the 2004 Infierno en el Ring steel cage match. The match came down to Aguayo Jr. and Negro Casas who had been the young Aguayo's mentor up until then. The match saw Aguayo Jr. trick his mentor and escape the cage, forcing Negro Casas to have his hair shaved off as a result. Following the match Perro Aguayo Jr. turned rudo and aligned himself with Pierroth Jr., Vampiro and Tarzan Boy to form the group La Furia del Norte, which later added Héctor Garza and El Terrible to its ranks as well. The trio of Garza, Terrible and Tarzan defeated the team of Black Warrior, Rayo de Jalisco Jr. and El Canek to win the CMLL World Trios Championship in November, 2004.

In the early part of 2004 Perro Aguayo Jr. had been involved in a heated storyline with Los Hermanos Dinamita (Cien Caras, Universo 2000 and Máscara Año 2000), the continuation of Los Hermanos feud with Aguayo Jr.'s father Perro Aguayo. The simmering tension between the two rudo teams came to a head in late 2004 with Perro Aguayo Jr. targeting Universo 2000 while Furia members Pierroth and Vampiro worked with Cien Caras and Máscara Año 2000. At the 2003 Sin Piedad Pierroth Jr. has lost a Luchas de Apuesta to Universo 2000 and was looking to even the score against Universo's brothers.

== Event ==
The opening match of the show featured CMLL's Mini-Estrella division in a tag team match. The tecnico team of Tzuki and Último Dragóncito wrestled against two of the most experienced Mini-Estrellas, the rudo team of Espectrito and Pierrothito in a "best two-out-of-three" falls match. The tecnico team won the third and final fall to claim the overall victory. In the second match the Mexican National Trios Champions, El Felino, Safari and Volador Jr., defended their championship against the Pandilla Guerrera ("Gang of Warriors") group that consisted of Doctor X, Hooligan and Nitro. The champions successfully retained their titles, winning the best two out of three falls six-man tag team match. In the third match of the night, new addition to the Los Guerreros del Infierno ("The Infernal Warriors") group Olímpico teamed up with founders Rey Bucanero and Último Guerrero to defeat the tecnico trio of Atlantis, Dos Caras Jr. and Shocker, two falls to one.

While El Terrible, Héctor Garza and Tarzan Boy held the CMLL World Trios Championship at the time it was not on the line in the fourth match as La Furia del Norte took on the team of El Hijo del Santo, Negro Casas and Místico. Místico had yet to establish himself as a top player in CMLL, but had been taken under the wing of Hijo del Santo and Negro Casas, two of the top tecnicos of the time. La Furia lost both the second and the third fall of the match. The fifth match of the night was more of a brawl than a wrestling match, with Perro Aguayo Jr. and Universo 2000 both wrestling a very aggressive match that saw both wrestlers fight outside the ring for extended periods of time. At one point Universo 2000 even pushed Perro Aguayo, Sr. who was at ringside. Near the end of the match Universo 2000 tried to apply the "Black Hammer", his signature move. Universo's "Black Hammer" was the storyline reason for why Aguayo, Sr, had to retire and the prospect of Universo 2000 doing the same to his son caused Perro Agauayo to jump in the ring and attack Universo 2000 before he could execute the move. The attack caused his son to be disqualified but the Aguayos did not care as they ran Universo 2000 out of the ring. The main event tag team match saw all four wrestlers brawl throughout the arena, something which was unusual for CMLL matches at the time, but really help convey the intensity of the storyline between the four men. At one point Pierroth's aide La Comandante came to the ring to help out, but was stopped before she could get to the ring. In the end Los Hermanos Dinamita defeated both Pierroth and Vampiro, forcing them both to be shaved bald as a result of the match.

== Aftermath ==
The storyline between the Aguayos and Los Hermanos Dinamita drew Perro Aguayo out of retirement for one last match. The Aguayos clashed with Cien Caras and Máscara Año 2000 in the main event of the 2005 Homenaje a Dos Leyendas ("Homage to Two Legends") show the following match. The Aguayos were successful and both Dinamitas were shaved bald following their loss. La Furia del Norte later became known as Los Perros del Mal ("The Bad Dogs") as the group expanded with even more members.

== Results ==
No.	Results	Stipulations
1	Tzuki and Último Dragóncito defeated Espectrito and Pierrothito	Best two-out-of-three falls Tag team match
2	El Felino, Safari and Volador Jr. (c) defeated Pandilla Guerrera (Doctor X, Hooligan and Nitro)	Best two-out-of-three falls six-man "Lucha Libre rules" tag team match for the Mexican National Trios Championship
3	Los Guerreros del Infierno (Olímpico, Rey Bucanero and Último Guerrero) defeated Atlantis, Dos Caras Jr. and Shocker	Best two-out-of-three falls six-man "Lucha Libre rules" tag team match
4	El Hijo del Santo, Negro Casas and Místico defeated La Furia del Norte (El Terrible, Héctor Garza and Tarzan Boy)	Best two-out-of-three falls six-man "Lucha Libre rules" tag team match
5	Universo 2000 defeated Perro Aguayo Jr. by disqualification	Best two-out-of-three falls singles match
6	Los Hermanos Dinamita (Cien Caras and Máscara Año 2000) defeated Pierroth and Vampiro Canadiense	Best two-out-of-three falls tag team Lucha de Apuestas hair vs. hair match
(c) / – the champion(s) heading into the match
