= Sin Piedad (2007) =

Mexican professional wrestling supercard show

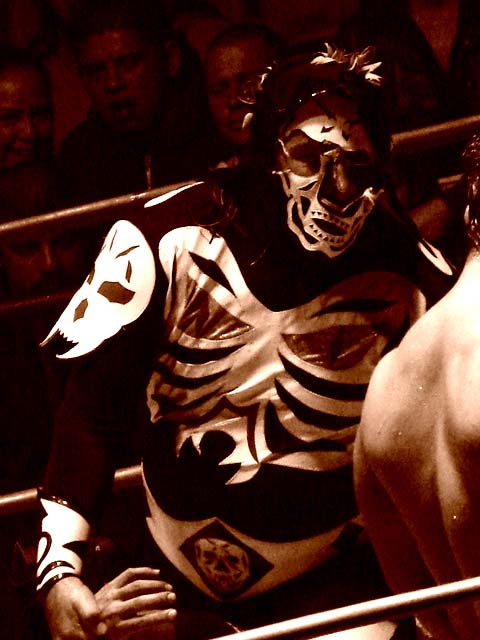
- L.A. Park wrestled against Perro Aguayo Jr. in the fifth match of the night
- Promotion: Consejo Mundial de Lucha Libre
- Date: December 17, 2007
- City: Mexico City, Mexico
- Venue: Arena México

Event chronology
← Previous; Reyes del Aire	Next → Pequeños Reyes del Aire

Sin Piedad chronology
← Previous; 2006	Next → 2008

Sin Piedad (2007) (Spanish for "No Mercy") was a professional wrestling pay-per-view (PPV) produced by Consejo Mundial de Lucha Libre (CMLL), which took place on December 7, 2007 in Arena México, Mexico City, Mexico. The 2007 Sin Piedad was the sixth event under that name that CMLL promoted as their last major show of the year, always held in December. The main event of Sin Piedad was originally supposed to be a tag team Lucha de Apuesta, hair vs. hair match between the teams of Shocker and Rey Bucanero and Black Warrior teaming with Lizmark Jr. but in the week before the show the partners were switched around to a relevos increíbles match where a Tecnico ("fan favorite") teams up with a "villain" so that Shocker teamed with Lizmark Jr. and Rey Bucanero teamed with Black Warrior. In the end Shocker forced Black Warrior to submit while Lizmark Jr. pinned Rey Bucanero to win the match. Following the match Rey Bucanero and Black Warrior were both shaved bald. The undercard featured a very intense singles match between L.A. Park and Perro Aguayo Jr. that had begun when L.A. Park returned to CMLL some months earlier and involved Aguayo Jr.'s group Los Perros del Mal. Los Perros ended up costing their leader the match as they attacked LA Park during the third and final match, causing a disqualification. The featured four additional matches, all Six-man "Lucha Libre rules" tag team matches with no major storyline built into them.

== Production ==
=== Background ===
The Mexican wrestling company Consejo Mundial de Lucha Libre (Spanish for "World Wrestling Council"; CMLL) has held a number of major shows over the years using the moniker Sin Piedad ("No Pity" or "No Mercy"). CMLL has intermittently held a show billed specifically as Sin Piedad since 2000, primarily using the name for their "end of the year" show in December, although they once held a Sin Piedad show in August as well. CMLL has on occasion used a different name for the end-of-year show but Sin Piedad is the most commonly used name. All Sin Piedad shows have been held in Arena México in Mexico City, Mexico which is CMLL's main venue, its "home". Traditionally CMLL holds their major events on Friday Nights, which means the Sin Piedad shows replace their regularly scheduled Super Viernes show. The 2007 Sin Piedad show was the seventh show to use the name.

=== Storylines ===
The event featured six professional wrestling matches with different wrestlers involved in pre-existing scripted feuds, plots and storylines. Wrestlers were portrayed as either heels (referred to as rudos in Mexico, representing the "bad guys") or faces (técnicos in Mexico, the "good guy" characters). They followed a series of tension-building events, which culminated in a wrestling match or series of matches.

== Results ==
No.	Results	Stipulations	Times
1	Dark Angel, Luna Mágica and Marcela defeated La Amapola, Hiroka and Medusa	Best two-out-of-three falls six-woman "Lucha Libre rules" tag team match	11:30
2	Los Hijos del Averno (Ephesto and Mephisto) and Virus defeated El Felino, Super Nova and Valiente	Best two-out-of-three falls six-man "Lucha Libre rules" tag team match	11:57
3	Dos Caras Jr., El Sagrado and La Sombra defeated Los Perros del Mal (Damián 666, Mr. Águila and El Terrible)	Best two-out-of-three falls six-man "Lucha Libre rules" tag team match	12:31
4	Blue Panther, Negro Casas and Místico defeated Averno and Los Guerreros del Infierno (Atlantis and Último Guerrero) – two falls to zero	Best two-out-of-three falls six-man "Lucha Libre rules" tag team match	10:28
5	L.A. Park defeated Perro Aguayo Jr. – two falls to one	Best two-out-of-three falls match	14:45
6	Lizmark Jr. and Shocker defeated Black Warrior and Rey Bucanero – two falls to one	Best two-out-of-three falls Relevos Incredibles Tag team Lucha de Apuestas, hair vs. hair match	14:53
