= Los Hombres del Camuflaje =

Professional wrestling tag team

Tag team
- Members: Artillero; Súper Comando
- Name: Los Hombres del Camuflaje
- Billed heights: 1.72 m (5 ft 7 1/2 in) (Artillero); 1.78 m (5 ft 10 in) (Súper Comando)
- Combined billed weight: 76 kg (168 lb) (Artillero); 87 kg (192 lb) (Súper Comando); 163 kg (359 lb) (Combined)
- Debut: February 18, 2005
- Disbanded: January 5, 2016

Los Hombres del Camuflaje (Spanish for "Men In Camouflage") was a Mexican sibling professional wrestling tag team consisting of Artillero (real name unrevealed) and Súper Comando (real name Gustavo Torres Ramirez). The team is working for the Mexican professional wrestling promotion Consejo Mundial de Lucha Libre (CMLL) portraying rudos ("Bad guys") wrestling characters. Los Hombres del Camuflaje are second generation wrestlers, sons of wrestler Principe Odin, with several of their brothers being professional wrestlers. Artillero is a Luchador enmascarado, or masked professional wrestler while Súper Comando worked as an enmascarado until December 25, 2015. Artillero's real name is not a matter of public record, as is often the case with masked wrestlers in Mexico where their private lives are kept a secret from the wrestling fans. Artillero and Super Comando are the brothers of CMLL low card wrestler Bengala, although it is not openly acknowledged by CMLL. The two used a military theme, reflected in their ring gear, mask and trunks which is at least partially camouflage.

== Personal life ==
Gustavo Torres Ramirez, later known under the ring name Súper Comando, was born on February 23, 1981 and Artillero was born on August 12, 1982, both in Mexico City, Mexico, the second and third oldest sons of professional wrestler Príncipe Odín (Prince Odin). Their older brother is an active wrestlers under the name Bengala and his younger brothers work as Principe Odin, Jr. and Babe Torres. Artillero's full names are not publicly known, which is traditionally the case in Lucha Libre when a wrestler has never been unmasked, but it is known that his last name is Torres Ramirez, revealed when his brother Daniel Torres Ramirez was unmasked. On December 25, 2015 Súper Comando lost his mask and revealed that his real name was Gustavo Torres Ramirez.

== Professional wrestling career ==
Gustavo Torres, the older brother, made his professional wrestling debut in 1998, initially working under the ring name Dios Rojo, but quickly adopted the ring name Súper Comando. The Súper Comando character was created from Gustavo's desire to go to Military School he came up with the concept that incorporated a military theme in his mask and tights. His younger brother was trained both by their father as well as the trainers as the CMLL wrestling school, Tony Salazar, Hijo del Gladiador and Virus and made his debut in 2005. He adopted the name "Artillero" (Spanish for Gunner or Artilleryman) and formed a team with his brother under the name Los Hombres del Camuflaje ("Men In Camouflage"). The team worked as a low-card, rudo (wrestlers who portray "bad guy" characters) tag team. In 2006 Los Hombres del Camuflaje won the Queretaro State Tag Team Championship, a local title only defended in the state of Queretaro. The team wrestled on CMLL's 2006 Sin Piedad major show where they lost to Flash and Super Nova when Los Hombres were disqualified for cheating. Over the years the team developed a long running rivalry with the low-card tecnico team called Los Rayos Tapatío. CMLL reactivated the long dormant CMLL Arena Coliseo Tag Team Championship, a title for the low to mid level teams in their promotion and held a tournament to establish the first champions. Los Hombres del Camuflaje entered the tournament, but were eliminated in the first round by Los Metales (Metálico and Metalik). The team was part of a limited number of CMLL wrestlers who went on a tour of Spain in 2008, working three dates there facing various combinations of Astro Boy, Molotov and Metálico. In 2010 Los Hombres participated in a tournament, with the winners receiving a chance to challenge for the Arena Coliseo Tag Team Championship, but this time they were defeated by Los Angeles Celestiales ("The Heavenly Angels"; Ángel de Oro and Ángel de Plata). Los Hombres del Camuflaje continues to be an entertaining, low card rudo act whose primary purpose is to help rookie tecnicos gain in ring experience.

In the fall of 2015 Súper Comando became involved in a storyline rivalry with The Panther, a young masked tecnico, son of Blue Panther. Over the course of several months the two often faced off on opposite sides of tag team and six-man matches, often with Súper Comando targeting his younger opponent, tearing his mask to push the storyline that he wanted to teach the rookie a lesson. In early December CMLL announced that Súper Comando and The Panther would joint 10 other wrestlers; Blue Panther Jr., Puma and Tiger, Cancerbero, Esfinge, Fuego, Pegasso, Raziel, Sangre Azteca and Tritón in the main event of the 2015 Infierno en el Ring show. During a press conference featuring all 12 competitors Puma made reference to Súper Comando being an "old man", something the 34-year old Súper Comando objected to, stating that he might have to teach Puma a lesson during the cage match. The week before the cage match all twelve wrestlers faced off in a torneo cibernetico elimination match, which saw The Panther and Súper Comando face off several times and also saw Súper Comando and Puma clash despite being on the same team. Puma was partially responsible for Súper Comando being eliminated from the match. The Infierno en el Ring match came down to Súper Comando and The Panther being the last two wrestlers in the steel cage, with The Panther forcing Súper Comando to submit. Afterwards Súper Comando was forced to unmask and announce his real name while being consoled by his father and brothers who were at ringside for the match. On January 5, 2016, Súper Comando announced his departure from CMLL.

== Championships and accomplishments ==
- Comisión de Box y Lucha Libre Queretaro
  - Queretaro State Tag Team Championship (1 time)
- International Wrestling Revolution Group
  - IWRG Intercontinental Trios Championship (1 time, current) – with Mocho Cota Jr. and Tito Santana

== Luchas de Apuestas record ==
Winner (wager)	Loser (wager)	Location	Event	Date	Notes
The Panther (mask)	Súper Comando (mask)	Mexico City	Infierno en el Ring	December 25, 2015	(Note: Final two men in a 12-man steel cage match that also included Blue Panther Jr., Cancerbero, Esfinge, Fuego, Pegasso, Puma, Raziel, Sangre Azteca, Tiger and Tritón.)
