= Sin Piedad (2000) =

Mexican professional wrestling supercard show

- Promotion: Consejo Mundial de Lucha Libre
- Date: December 15, 2000
- City: Mexico City, Mexico
- Venue: Arena México
- Attendance: 14,000

Pay-per-view chronology
← Previous; Leyenda de Azul	Next → Juicio Final

Sin Piedad chronology
← Previous; First	Next → 2001

Sin Piedad (2000) (Spanish for "No Mercy", not to be confused with a similarly-titled series of PPV's hosted by WWE) was a professional wrestling pay-per-view produced by Consejo Mundial de Lucha Libre (CMLL), which took place on December 15, 2000, in Arena México, Mexico City, Mexico. The 2000 Sin Piedad was the first event under that name that CMLL promoted as their last major show of the year, always held in December. The main event of the pay-per-view was a Lucha de Apuestas, hair vs. hair match between Cien Caras and Perro Aguayo. The show also featured a tag team match for the CMLL World Tag Team Championship where the champions Los Guerreros del Infierno (Rey Bucanero and Último Guerrero) defended the championship against the team of El Hijo del Santo and Negro Casas. The show featured an additional tag team match and three six-man "Lucha Libre rules" tag team matches.

== Production ==
=== Background ===
The Mexican wrestling company Consejo Mundial de Lucha Libre (Spanish for "World Wrestling Council"; CMLL) has held a number of major shows over the years using the moniker Sin Piedad ("No Pity" or "No Mercy"). CMLL has intermittently held a show billed specifically as Sin Piedad since 2000, primarily using the name for their "end of the year" show in December, although once they held a Sin Piedad show in August as well. CMLL has on occasion used a different name for the end-of-year show but Sin Piedad is the most commonly used name. All Sin Piedad shows have been held in Arena México in Mexico City, Mexico which is CMLL's main venue, its "home". Traditionally CMLL holds their major events on Friday Nights, which means the Sin Piedad shows replace their regularly scheduled Super Viernes show. The 2000 Sin Piedad show was the first show to use the name.

=== Storylines ===
The event featured five professional wrestling matches with different wrestlers involved in pre-existing scripted feuds, plots and storylines. Wrestlers were portrayed as either heels (referred to as rudos in Mexico, those that portray the "bad guys") or faces (técnicos in Mexico, the "good guy" characters) as they followed a series of tension-building events, which culminated in a wrestling match or series of matches.

The opening match saw the semi-regular team of Sombra de Plata and Ricky Marvin faced off against the Stone brothers, also known as Los Bellos Stone (Chris and Alan Stone). Sombra de Plata and Marvin began working as a regular team in mid-1999 where their matches against Fugaz and Sangre Azteca in match that stole the show, earning four wrestlers standing ovations from the crowds. The success of this match earned all four a match at CMLL's biggest show of the year the CMLL 66th Anniversary Show, which took place on September 24, 1999. This time Marvin and Sombra de Plata won the match. At the following year's CMLL 67th Anniversary Show Sombra de Plata teamed up with Mano Negra Jr. as they lost to Los Bello Stone. For the December 2000 show Sombra de Plata teamed up with his regular partner Marvin to take on the Stone brothers.

The third match of the night was a clash between the Los Villanos brothers, Villano III, Villano IV, and Villano V and several wrestlers from the La Lagunero area of Mexico, the trio of Dr. Wagner Jr., Blue Panther, and Black Warrior who had developed a rivalry with the brothers over the last several months and who would have repeated clashes over the years following the 2000 Sin Piedad show. The fifth match of the night would see the team of Los Guerreros del Infierno ("The Infernal Warriors"; Rey Bucanero and Último Guerrero) defend their CMLL World Tag Team Championship against the team of El Hijo del Santo and Negro Casas. Hijo del Santo and Negro Casas were the previous holders of the championship, but were forced to vacate the title when Hijo del Santo stopped working for CMLL on a full time basis in mid-2000. Los Guerreros del Infierno had won a tournament for the vacant titles only a month earlier when the two defeated Mr. Niebla and Villano IV at CMLL's Entre Torre Infernal show. Hijo del Santo returned to CMLL during the tournament, immediately challenging the new champions for a title match since they never defeated the duo of Hijo del Santo and Negro Casas for the championship.

The feud leading to the main event started even before AAA was created, hailing back to Empresa Mexicana de Lucha Libre (EMLL) where both Cien Caras and Perro Aguayo were two of the featured wrestlers. The two had faced off in another Lucha de Apuestas as the main event of the EMLL 58th Anniversary Show in a match that also included Konnan. Once AAA was created both wrestlers left EMLL to join the fledgeling promotion, continuing their heated rivalry in AAA as well. At the very first Triplemanía show on April 30, 1993 Perro Aguayo defeated Cien Caras' brother Máscara Año 2000 to unmask him. The two also clashed across all three Triplemanía III events, A, B and C. They were also on opposite sides of a match at the 1996 Triplemanía IV-A show where Aguayo teamed up with Konnan to defeat Cien Caras and Pierroth Jr. in a Lumberjack match. Once both Aguayo and Cien Caras resurfaced in Consejo Mundial de Lucha Libre (CMLL; formerly EMLL) the storyline reemerged and led to the main event of the 2000 Sin Piedad where both wrestlers put their hair on the line in a Luchas de Apuestas match.

== Event ==
The opening match was a tag team match between the brothers Chris and Alan Stone taking on the regular team of Ricky Marvin and Sombra de Plata in a high flying, high speed opening match. The first fall ended when both Stone brothers were counted out of the ring, following a couple of high flying moves from Marvin and Sombra de Plata to the floor. The second match saw Alan Stone pin Sombra de Plata and Chris pinned Ricky Marvin to tie the match at one fall a piece. In the third fall Ricky Marvin pinned Chris Stone, followed by Alan Stone being counted out after a dive out of the ring ended up hurting him. With the count-out Ricky Marvin and Sombra de Plata won the match, two falls to one in 18 minutes and 29 seconds. The second match of the night, the first six-man tag team match, the most common match type in Lucha Libre, especially in CMLL, featured the tecnico team of Tony Rivera, El Felino and Safari taking on the experienced rudo team of Violencia, Bestia Salvaje and Fuerza Guerrera. In the first of a total of three falls Tony Rivera pinned Bestia Salvaje to take the first fall for himself, Felino and Safari. In the second fall Fuerza Guerrera used underhanded tactics to gain the advantage, pinning El Felino to even the score between the two teams. The match lasted 21 minutes and 15 seconds before Fuerza Guerrera repeated his feat in the second fall and pinned El Felino once more to win the match for his team.

In the third match of the night the regular team of Los Villanos went head to head with the makeshift team of Dr. Wagner Jr., Blue Panther and Black Warrior who all represented Mexico's La Lagunero (the Lagoon) area, but were not considered a regular team as such. In the first fall Villano IV pinned El Galeno del Mal ("the bad Doctor"; Dr. Wagner Jr.) and then team captain Villano III pinned Blue Panther to claim the first fall for their team. In the second fall Dr. Wagner Jr. won the fall for his team by defeating team captain Villano III by pinfall. The third fall of the match, which was also the longest of the three falls by far, saw Villano IV force team captain Dr. Wagner Jr. to give in to the pain of a submission hold. In the fourth match of the night Los Guapos ("The Hansome Ones"), the team of Shocker and Emilio Charles Jr. teaming up with Tarzan Boy from Los Guerreros del Infierno. On the opposite side El Satánico, continued his feud with Los Guerreros after they turned on Satánico and Los Infernales, teamed up with the clear cut tecnicos of Atlantis and Mr. Niebla. In the first fall Tarzan Boy pinned his rival Satánico while Shocker pinned Atlantis to gain the first fall. In the second fall Satánico reversed his fortune when he pinned Tarzan Boy moments after Atlantis had pinned Shocker, tying the match at one fall apiece. In the third fall Tarzan Boy caused his team the match when he was disqualified for excessive violence against Satánico, ignoring the referee's instructions to stop on more than one occasion. With the disqualification Satánico, Atlantis and Mr. Niebla won the fall and the match.

The semi-final match presented the first major challenge in the short reign of the then reigning CMLL World Tag Team Champions, Rey Bucanero and Último Guerrero as they faced former champions Negro Casas and the returning Hijo del Santo, the clear crowd favorites. The crowd favorites got the fans on their feet during the first fall, especially when Hijo del Santo forced Rey Bucanero to submit to his trademark submission hold called La de a Caballo (Camel clutch). Moments later Último Guerrero was unable to return to the ring before the referee counted to twenty, costing his team the first fall. The tag team champions fought their way back in control of the ring and won the second fall to tie it all up. The third fall saw Casas and Hijo del Santo almost win the championship on several occasions, but in the end Bucanero pinned Negro Casas while Guerrero pinned El Hijo del Santo to retain their titles. The emotions behind the main event was evident from before the bell even rang, with both veteran competitors attacking each. The match was more of a brutal fight than a wrestling exhibition as the two fought both inside and outside the ring. The match was relatively short, three falls in the span of just eight minutes and twenty six seconds, but it was action filled from start to finish. In the end Aguayo defeated his longtime enemy to take the match. Following the match Cien Caras had all his hair shaved off while sitting in the middle of the ring, honoring the Luchas de Apuestas stipulation.

== Aftermath ==
The feud between Los Villanos and the Los Laguneros team would over time lead to Villano V unmasking Blue Panther and later on fellow Lagunero Último Guerrero unmasking Villano V. Los Guerreros del Infierno would hold the CMLL World Tag Team Championship until November of the following year where Negro Casas and Hijo del Santo would finally unseat them. While Aguayo would retire not long after the 2000 Sin Pidead the feud with Cien Caras and his brothers would pull him back into active competition, backing up his son Perro Aguayo Jr. in the feud with Los Hermanos Dinamita through 2004 and 2005.

=== Results ===
No.	Results	Stipulations	Times
1	Ricky Marvin and Sombra de Plata defeated Los Bello Stone (Chris and Alan Stone) – two falls to one	Best two-out-of-three falls tag team match	18:29
2	Violencia, Bestia Salvaje and Fuerza Guerrera defeated Tony Rivera, El Felino and Safari – two falls to one	Best two-out-of-three falls six-man "Lucha Libre rules" tag team match	21:15
3	Los Villanos (Villaño III, Villaño IV and Villaño V) defeated Dr. Wagner Jr., Blue Panther and Black Warrior – two falls to one	Best two-out-of-three falls six-man "Lucha Libre rules" tag team match	22:24
4	Atlantis, Mr. Niebla and El Satánico defeated Los Guapos (Shocker and Emilio Charles Jr.) and Tarzan Boy – two falls to one	Best two-out-of-three falls six-man "Lucha Libre rules" tag team match	18:36
5	Los Guerreros del Infierno (Rey Bucanero and Último Guerrero) (c) defeated El Hijo del Santo and Negro Casas – two falls to one	Best two-out-of-three falls tag team match for the CMLL World Tag Team Championship	18:26
6	Perro Aguayo defeated Cien Caras by pinfall	Best two-out-of-three falls Lucha de Apuestas hair vs. hair match	08:26
(c) / – the champion(s) heading into the match
