= Katsushi Takemura =

Japanese retired professional wrestler (born 1972)

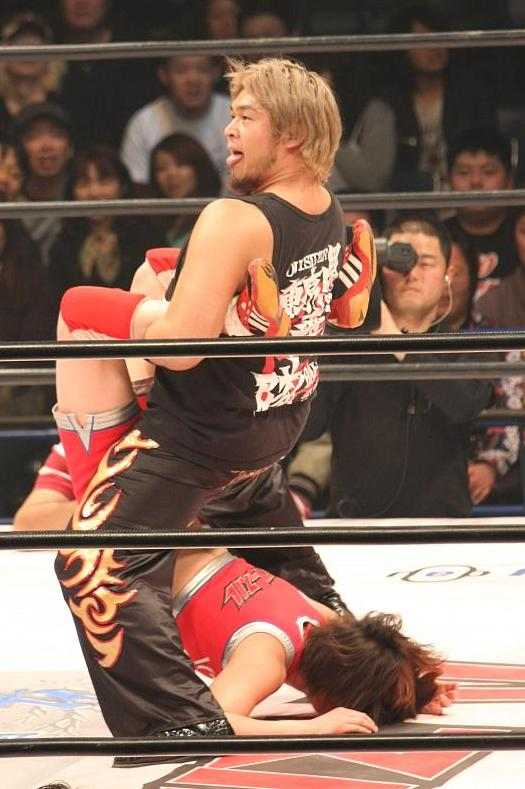

Personal information
- Born: August 21, 1972 (age 53) Joyo, Kyoto, Japan

Professional wrestling career
- Ring name(s): Great Take; Muga Takemura; Katsushi Takemura; Takemura
- Billed height: 1.78 m (5 ft 10 in)
- Billed weight: 99 kg (218 lb)
- Trained by: Tatsumi Fujinami; Osamu Nishimura
- Debut: July 22, 1997
- Retired: January 6, 2009

Katsushi Takemura (竹村 豪氏, Takemura Katsushi) is a Japanese retired professional wrestler, mostly known for his ring name Takemura (written in all capitals). Having worked for New Japan Pro-Wrestling for most of his career, he was an occasional member of the renowned stable Tokyo Gurentai.

== Professional wrestling career ==
=== New Japan Pro-Wrestling (1997–2008) ===
Katshushi Takemura started his professional wrestling career by training in the NJPW dojo in 1997 as a "young lion". He made his debut in the Catch Of Lancashire III, losing in the first round to Alexander Otsuka. During his long tenure with company, he was unsuccessful in winning any championships with the company, he would be positioned on the lower mid-card.

=== All Japan Pro Wrestling (2004–2009) ===
Katshushi's last match was with AJPW when he, Gurentai and Minoru Suzuki lost to Seiya Sanada, Shuji Kondo and Suwama. After this match, he would announce his retirement from professional wrestling.

== Championship and accomplishments ==
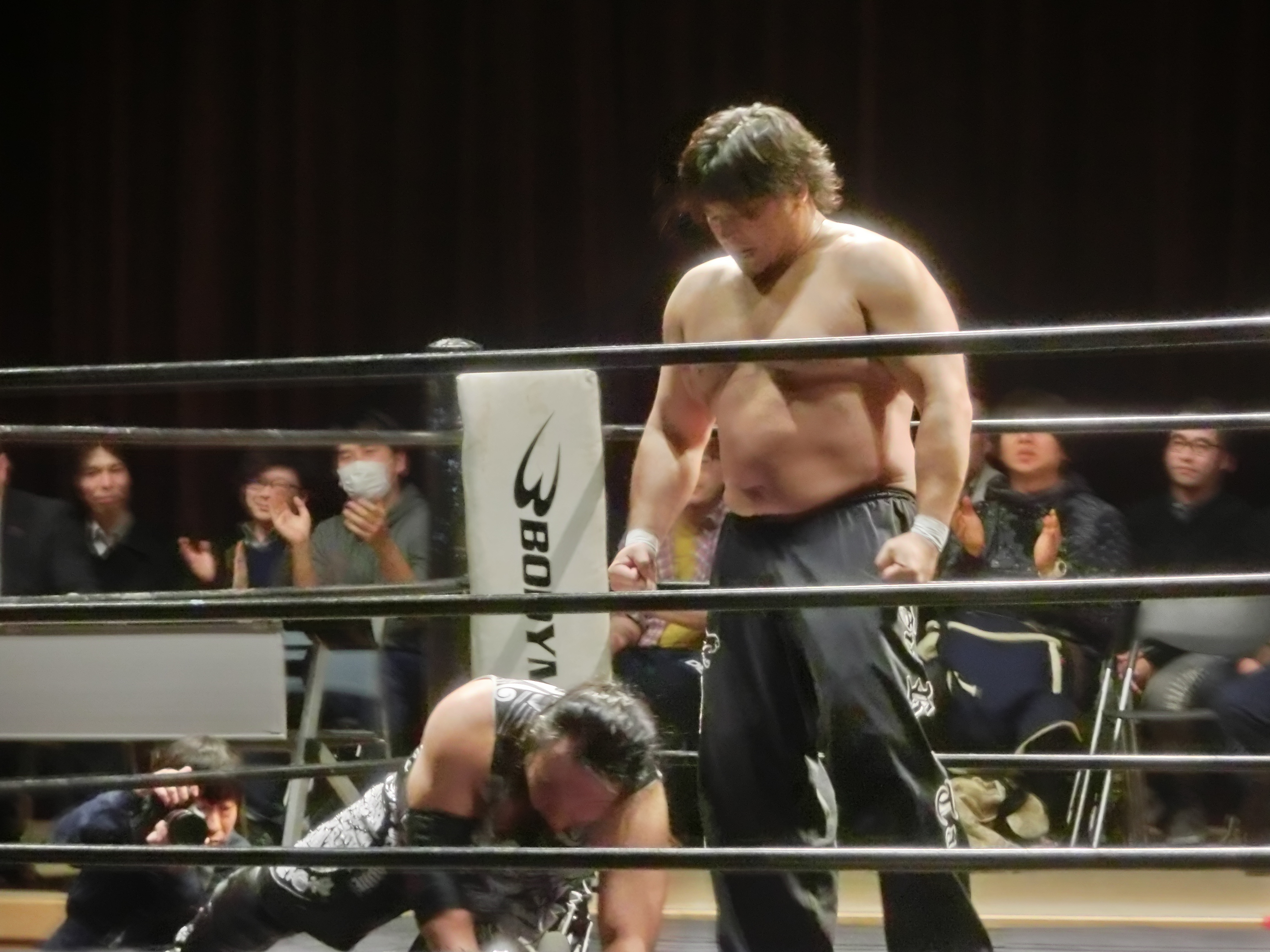
Takemura wrestling against Mazada in 2019.

- Dradition Pro Wrestling
  - CAW Central United States Tag Team Championship (1 time) - with Kazuhiko Shoda
- International Wrestling Revolution Group
  - IWRG Intercontinental Trios Championship (1 time) - with Nosawa and Masada
  - IWRG Intercontinental Trios Title Tournament winner
- Mobius
  - Apex of Triangle Six–Man Tag Team Championship (1 time) - with Nosawa Rongai and Masada
- Pro Wrestling Illustrated
  - PWI ranked him No. 356 of the top 500 single wrestlers on the PWI 500 in 2006.
- Toryumon X
  - UWA World Trios Championship (1 time) – with Gedo and Jado

== In other media ==
Katshushi Takemura is a playable character in various video games. These include King Of Colosseum II, King Of Colosseum Red and Fire Pro Wrestling 2 all for PlayStation 2, and Fire Pro Wrestling Returns on Game Boy Advance.
