= Torneo Gran Alternativa (November 1996) =

Mexican professional wrestling tournament

- Promotion: Consejo Mundial de Lucha Libre
- Date: November 15, 1996
- City: Mexico City, Mexico
- Venue: Arena México

Event chronology
← Previous; CMLL 63rd Anniversary Show	Next → Juicio Final

CMLL Torneo Gran Alternativa chronology
← Previous; June 1996	Next → 1998

The Torneo Gran Alternativa (November 1999) (Spanish for "Great Alternative Tournament") was the a professional wrestling tournament held by the Mexican professional wrestling promotion Consejo Mundial de Lucha Libre (CMLL; Spanish for "World Wrestling Council") in 1996. As it is a professional wrestling tournament, it is not won or lost competitively but instead by the decisions of the bookers of a wrestling promotion that is not publicized prior to the shows to maintain the illusion that professional wrestling is a competitive sport.

In 1996 decided to host two Gran Alternativa tournaments, with the second one being held on November 15, 1996, in Mexico City, Mexico. Unlike any of the other Torneo Gran Alternativa tournaments before or after, this tournament featured a preliminary round of 20 rookies in a league style tournament to qualify for the actual tag team tournament. The rookies were divided into four groups of five, in a round-robin series of matches where the top two point earners would advance to the tournament. Qualifying for the tournament were Máscara Mágica, Rey Bucanero, Olímpico, Mr. Niebla, Astro Rey Jr., Atlantico, Karloff Lagarde Jr. and Panthera onca. Emilio Charles Jr. and Rey Bucanero won the Torneo Gran Alternativa by defeating the teams of Lizmark Jr. and Jaguar, Satánico and Karloff Lagarde Jr. and Héctor Garza and Mr. Niebla. Rey Bucanero became one of CMLL's main players as he would become a key member of Los Guerreros del Infierno.

== History ==
Starting in 1994 the Mexican professional wrestling promotion Consejo Mundial de Lucha Libre (CMLL) created a special tournament concept where they would team up a novato, or rookie, with a veteran for a single-elimination tag team tournament with the purpose of increasing the profile of the rookie wrestler.

CMLL had used a similar concept in August 1994 where Novato Shocker teamed up with veterans Ringo Mendoza and Brazo de Plata to defeat novato Apolo Dantés and veterans Gran Markus Jr. and El Brazo in the finals of a six-man tag team tournament. CMLL would later modify the concept to two-man tag teams instead, creating a tournament that would be known as El Torneo Gran Alternativa, or "The Great Alternative Tournament", which became a recurring event on the CMLL calendar. CMLL did not hold a Gran Alternativa tournament in 1997 and 2000 held on each year from 2001 through 2014, opting not to hold a tournament in 2015.

== Tournament ==
For the November 1996 version of the Gran Alternativa, CMLL used a two-stage tournament, unlike any previous or future tournament. For the first round 20 rookies faced off against each other in four blocks of a round-robin series of matches where the top two point earners would advance to the tag team portion of the tournament.

Block 1	Block 2	Block 3	Block 4
Máscara Mágica	Rey Bucanero	Olímpico	Mr. Niebla
Astro Rey Jr.	Atlantico	Karloff Lagarde Jr.	Jaguar
Principe Frankie	Alacran	Olimpus	Brandon
Kung Fu Jr.	Ultraman Jr.	Corazón Salvaje	Linx
Filoso (II)	Ameríca	Mano Negro Jr.	Últimatum

== Tournament background ==
Gran Alternativa participants

Rookie	Veteran	Ref(s)
Astro Rey Jr.	El Felino	
Atlantico	Atlantis	
Jaguar	Lizmark Jr.	
Karloff Lagarde Jr.	El Satánico	
Máscara Mágica	Dos Caras	
Mr. Niebla	Héctor Garza	
Olímpico	Rayo de Jalisco Jr.	
Rey Bucanero	Emilio Charles Jr.	

== Tournament brackets ==
Quarterfinals
Atlantico and Atlantis
Héctor Garza and Mr. Niebla	W
Máscara Mágica and Dos Caras	W
Olímpico and Rayo de Jalisco Jr.
Astro Rey Jr. and El Felino
Karloff Lagarde Jr. and El Satánico	W
Rey Bucanero and Emilio Charles Jr.	W
Jaguar and Lizmark Jr.

Semifinals
Héctor Garza and Mr. Niebla	W
Máscara Mágica and Dos Caras
Karloff Lagarde Jr. and El Satánico
Rey Bucanero and Emilio Charles Jr.	W

Finals
Héctor Garza and Mr. Niebla
Rey Bucanero and Emilio Charles Jr.	W

== Aftermath ==
The Gran Alternativa victory signaled the beginning of Rey Bucanero's rise up the ranks of CMLL. In 1999 he became part of El Satánico's reformed Los Infernales group alongside Último Guerrero. The group later turned on Satánico to form Los Guerreros del Infierno (The Infernal Soldiers). Bucanero and Guerrero worked as a regular tag team throughout the 2000s, leading to them being voted the "Best Tag Team of the Decade" by the readers of the Wrestling Observer Newsletter. Over the years Rey Bucanero would hold a number of CMLL championships, including: CMLL World Light Heavyweight Championship, CMLL World Tag Team Championship four times, CMLL World Trios Championship, and the NWA World Historic Light Heavyweight Championship.

The other rookie finalist, Mr. Niebla, would also advance up the ranks of CMLL. A year after the Gran Alternativa tournament he won the mask of Shocker in the main event of the CMLL 66th Anniversary Show. He would go on to work for a number of other Mexican wrestling promotions as well, such as AAA and International Wrestling Revolution Group. Over the years he would go on to hold various championships in CMLL: CMLL World Heavyweight Championship, CMLL World Tag Team Championship, CMLL World Trios Championship twice, Mexican National Trios Championship twice, as well as winning the 2014 Gran Alternativa, and the 2012 Torneo de Parejas Increibles.
