= Juicio Final (1996) =

Mexican professional wrestling event

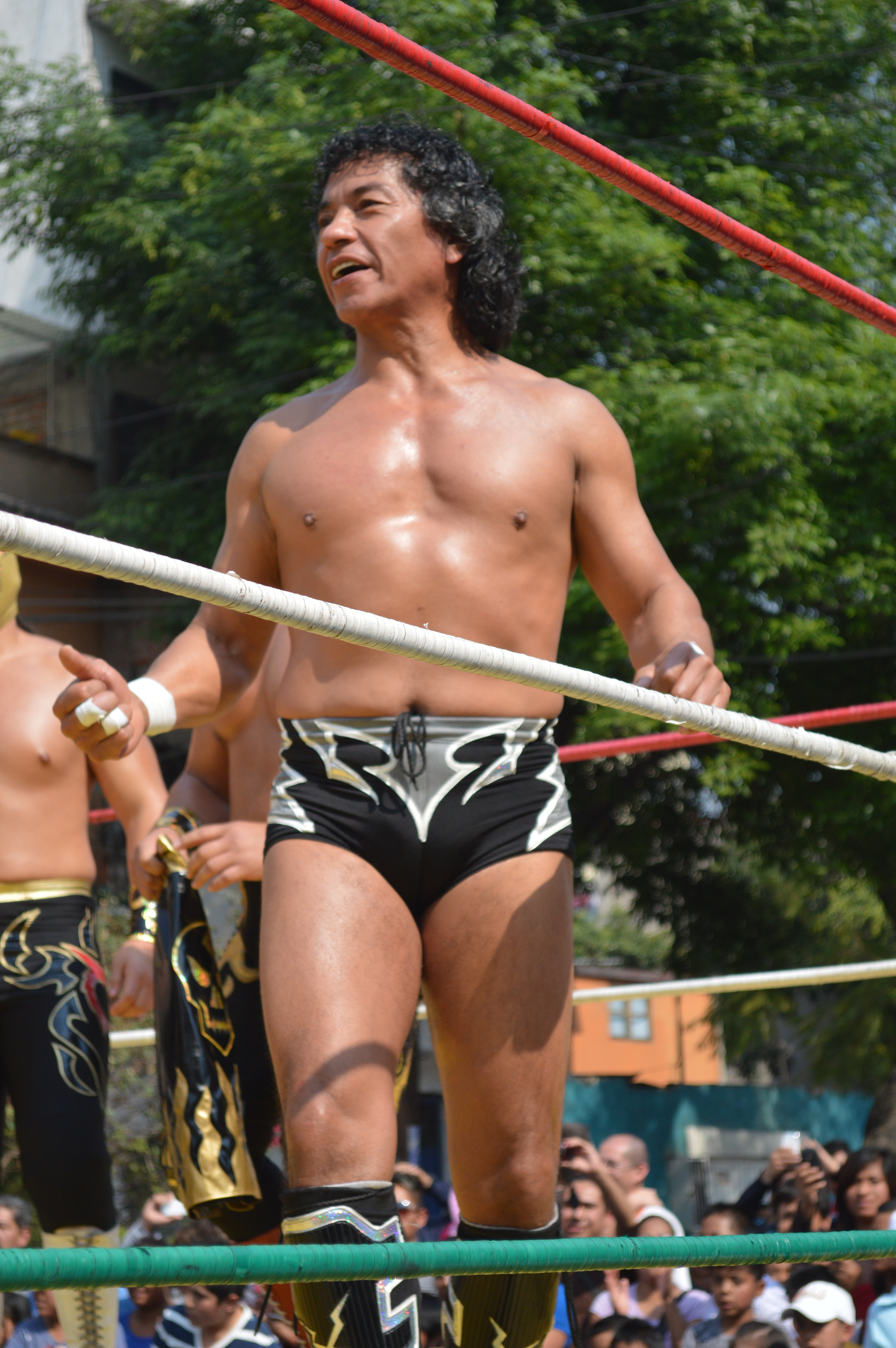
- Negro Casas, who did not lose his hair in the main event, but did not win the match either
- Promotion: Consejo Mundial de Lucha Libre
- Date: December 6, 1996 (aired December 7, 1996)
- City: Mexico City, Mexico
- Venue: Arena México

Event chronology
← Previous; Torneo Gran Alternativa	Next → Homenaje a Salvador Lutteroth

Juicio Final chronology
← Previous; 1995	Next → 1997

Juicio Final (1996) (Spanish for "Final Judgement" 1996) was the name used for two major professional wrestling shows, scripted and produced by Consejo Mundial de Lucha Libre (CMLL). The shows took place on December 6 and December 15, 1997 in Arena México, Mexico City, Mexico. The shows served as the year-end finale for CMLL before Arena México, CMLL's main venue, closed down for the winter for renovations and to host Circo Atayde. The shows replaced the regular Super Viernes ("Super Friday") shows held by CMLL since the mid-1930s.

The December 6 main event was a three-way Luchas de Apuestas, or bet match, between El Hijo del Santo, Negro Casas and El Dandy. In the main event El Hijo del Santo ended up defeating El Dandy, forcing El Dandy to have all his hair shaved off. The show included three additional matches.

== Production ==
=== Background ===
For decades Arena México, the main venue of the Mexican professional wrestling promotion Consejo Mundial de Lucha Libre (CMLL), would close down in early December and remain closed into either January or February to allow for renovations as well as letting Circo Atayde occupy the space over the holidays. As a result CMLL usually held a "end of the year" supercard show on the first or second Friday of December in lieu of their normal Super Viernes show. 1955 was the first year where CMLL used the name "El Juicio Final" ("The Final Judgement") for their year-end supershow. It is no longer an annually recurring show, but instead held intermittently sometimes several years apart and not always in the same month of the year either. All Juicio Final shows have been held in Arena México in Mexico City, Mexico which is CMLL's main venue, its "home".

=== Storylines ===
The 1996 Juicio Final shows featured a total of six professional wrestling matches scripted by CMLL with some wrestlers involved in scripted feuds. The wrestlers portray either heels (referred to as rudos in Mexico, those that play the part of the "bad guys") or faces (técnicos in Mexico, the "good guy" characters) as they perform.

== Results ==
No.	Results	Stipulations
1^{D}	Olimpus and Ultramán Jr. defeated Lynx and Reyes Veloz	Tag team match
2^{D}	Máscara Mágica, Olímpico and Ringo Mendoza defeated Cadaver de Ultratumba, Espectro Jr., and Mogur	Best two-out-of-three falls six-man tag team match
3^{D}	Brazo de Plata, Dos Caras, and Silver King defeated Black Warrior, Rambo, and Rey Bucanero by disqualification	Best two-out-of-three falls six-man tag team match
4	Atlantis, La Fiera, and Lizmark Jr. defeated Los Guapos (Bestia Salvaje, Emilio Charles Jr., and Scorpio Jr.) by disqualification	Best two-out-of-three falls six-man tag team match
5	Negro Casas defeated El Hijo del Santo and El Dandy	Loser advances Three-Way match
6	El Hijo del Santo (mask) defeated El Dandy (hair)	Lucha de Apuestas, mask vs. hair match
D / – this was a dark match
