= Torneo Gran Alternativa (2001) =

Mexican professional wrestling tournament

- Promotion: Consejo Mundial de Lucha Libre
- Date: August 14, 2001
- City: Mexico City, Mexico
- Venue: Arena México

Event chronology
| ← Previous; 45. Aniversario de Arena México | Next → CMLL 68th Anniversary Show |

CMLL Torneo Gran Alternativa chronology
| ← Previous; December 1999 | Next → 2003 |

The Torneo Gran Alternativa (2001) (Spanish for "Great Alternative Tournament") was a professional wrestling tournament held by the Mexican professional wrestling promotion Consejo Mundial de Lucha Libre (CMLL; Spanish for "World Wrestling Council"). The tournament was held on August 14, 2001, in Mexico City, Mexico at CMLL's main venue, Arena México. The Gran Alternativa tournament features tag teams composed of a rookie, or novato, and a veteran wrestler for an elimination tournament. The idea is to feature the novato wrestlers higher on the card that they usually work and help elevate one or more up the ranks. CMLL made the Torneo Gran Alternativa an annual event in 1995, only skipping it four times between 1994 and 2017. since it is a professional wrestling tournament, it is not won or lost competitively but instead by the decisions of the bookers of a wrestling promotion that is not publicized prior to the shows to maintain the illusion that professional wrestling is a competitive sport.

The 2001 Gran Alternativa was held on August 14, 2001, and was the first tournament to feature a Battle Royal between the eight rookies to determine the seeding for the first round of the tournament. Virus won the battle royal, getting the number one seed for himself and Blue Panther. Order of elimination in the battle royal: #1 Alan Stone, #2 Sicodelico Jr., #3 Enemigo Publico, #4 Sangre Azteca, #5 Tigre Blanco, #6 Volador Jr. and #7 Doctor X. The final saw Olímpico and Sicodelico Jr. defeat Black Warrior and Sangre Azteca to win the Gran Alternativa tournament. Sicodelico worked for CMLL until 2003, not achieving much of note with the promotion.

== History ==
Starting in 1994 the Mexican professional wrestling promotion Consejo Mundial de Lucha Libre (CMLL) created a special tournament concept where they would team up a novato, or rookie, with a veteran for a single-elimination tag team tournament with the purpose of increasing the profile of the rookie wrestler.

CMLL had used a similar concept in August 1994 where Novato Shocker teamed up with veterans Ringo Mendoza and Brazo de Plata to defeat novato Apolo Dantés and veterans Gran Markus Jr. and El Brazo in the finals of a six-man tag team tournament. CMLL would later modify the concept to two-man tag teams instead, creating a tournament that would be known as El Torneo Gran Alternativa, or "The Great Alternative Tournament", which became a recurring event on the CMLL calendar. CMLL did not hold a Gran Alternativa tournament in 1997 and 2000 held on each year from 2001 through 2014, opting not to hold a tournament in 2015.

== Tournament background ==
Gran Alternativa participants

| Rookie | Veteran | Ref(s) |
|---|---|---|
| Doctor X | Gran Markus Jr. | |
| Enemigo Publico | Máscara Año 2000 | |
| Sangre Azteca | Black Warrior | |
| Sicodelico Jr. | Olímpico | |
| Alan Stone | Mr. Niebla | |
| Tigre Blanco | Black Tiger | |
| Virus | Blue Panther | |
| Volador Jr. | Atlantis | |

== Tournament brackets ==
Quarterfinals
Virus and Blue Panther | W
Alan Stone and Mr. Niebla
Doctor X and Gran Markus Jr.
Sicodelico Jr. and Olímpico | W
Volador Jr. and Atlantis | W
Enemigo Publico and Máscara Año 2000
Tigre Blanco and Black Tiger
Sangre Azteca and Black Warrior | W

Semifinals
Virus and Blue Panther
Sicodelico Jr. and Olímpico | W
Volador Jr. and Atlantis
Sangre Azteca and Black Warrior | W

Finals
Sicodelico Jr. and Olímpico | W
Sangre Azteca and Black Warrior

== Aftermath ==
Sicodelico Jr., the son of professional wrestler Sicodelico and nephew of Dos Caras and Mil Máscaras, left CMLL in 2003 without achieving much of note in the promotion. He would later work on the independent circuit, and had a short stint in the WWE's developmental system using the names Aaron Rodrigues and El Espiral.

Sangre Azteca would go on to become a co-leader of a group called Pandilla Guerrera ("Gang of Warriors"), which later became known as Los Guerreros Tuareg. Los Guerreras won the Mexican National Trios Championship once, as well as winning the Mexican National Welterweight Championship. Sangre Azteca broke away from the group in 2008 to from Poder Mexica with Black Warrior and Dragón Rojo, Jr. as well as Misterioso, Jr. later on. The group also won the Mexican National Welterweight Championship once. The group disbanded in 2010, with Sanger Azteca working on the CMLL mid-card until leaving the promotion in 2019.
