= Torneo Gran Alternativa (1994) =

First CMLL Torneo Gran Alternativa professional wrestling tournament

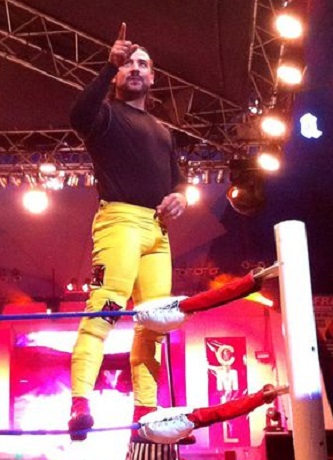
- Héctor Garza, the first rookie winner of the Gran Alternativa
- Promotion: Consejo Mundial de Lucha Libre
- Date: December 30, 1994
- City: Mexico City, Mexico
- Venue: Arena México

Event chronology
← Previous; Juicio Final	Next → Salvador Lutteroth Trios Tournament

Torneo Gran Alternativa chronology
← Previous; First	Next → 1995

The Torneo Gran Alternativa (1994) (Spanish for "Great Alternative Tournament") was the very first CMLL Torneo Gran Alternativa professional wrestling tournament held by the Mexican professional wrestling promotion Consejo Mundial de Lucha Libre (CMLL; Spanish for "World Wrestling Council"). The tournament was held on December 30, 1994, in Mexico City, Mexico at CMLL's main venue, Arena México. CMLL made the Torneo Gran Alternativa an annual event in 1995, only skipping it four times between 1994 and 2017. Since it is a professional wrestling tournament, it is not won or lost competitively but instead by the decisions of the bookers of a wrestling promotion that is not publicized prior to the shows to maintain the illusion that professional wrestling is a competitive sport.

The Gran Alternativa tournament features tag teams composed of a rookie, or novato, and a veteran wrestler for an elimination tournament. The idea is to feature the novato wrestlers higher on the card that they usually work and help elevate one or more up the ranks. The finals saw the team of veteran Negro Casas and rookie Héctor Garza defeat the team of Satánico and rookie Arkangel de la Muerte. In the subsequent years, Héctor Garza would rise up through the ranks in CMLL as well as working stints for World Championship Wrestling and Total Nonstop Action Wrestling in the U.S. and becoming a fixture on the CMLL main event scene.

== History ==
Starting in 1994 the Mexican professional wrestling promotion Consejo Mundial de Lucha Libre (CMLL) created a special tournament concept where they would team up a novato, or rookie, with a veteran for a single-elimination tag team tournament with the purpose of increasing the profile of the rookie wrestler.

CMLL had used a similar concept in August 1994 where Novato Shocker teamed up with veterans Ringo Mendoza and Brazo de Plata to defeat novato Apolo Dantés and veterans Gran Markus Jr. and El Brazo in the finals of a six-man tag team tournament. CMLL would later modify the concept to two-man tag teams instead, creating a tournament that would be known as El Torneo Gran Alternativa, or "The Great Alternative Tournament", which became a recurring event on the CMLL calendar. CMLL did not hold a Gran Alternativa tournament in 1997 and 2000 held on each year from 2001 through 2014, opting not to hold a tournament in 2015, but continuing annually since then

== Tournament brackets ==
Quarterfinals
Astro Rey Jr. and Gran Markus Jr.
Dr. Wagner Jr.	W
Héctor Garza and Negro Casas	W
Guerrero de la Muerte and Pierroth Jr.
Olímpico and Dos Caras
Arkangel de la Muerte and El Satánico	W
Shocker and El Dandy	W
Máscara Mágica and La Fiera

Semifinals
Halcon Negro Jr. and Dr. Wagner Jr.
Negro Casas and Héctor Garza	W
Arkangel de la Muerte and El Satánico
Shocker and El Dandy	W

Finals
Héctor Garza and Negro Casas	W
Arkangel de la Muerte and El Satánico

== Aftermath ==
The tournament win helped elevate Héctor Garza in CMLL as the young tecnico wrestler defeated both Bestia Salvaje and El Satánico in Luchas de Apuestas, or "bet matches", where the loser was shaved bald. He later worked on a regular basis for the US based World Championship Wrestling and won the CMLL World Trios Championship with Dos Caras and La Fiera. In 1996 Garza left CMLL for rival promotion AAA. In 2004 he worked for the US based Total Nonstop Action Wrestling where he was part of the team that won the America's X Cup tournament. In 2005 Garza returned to CMLL and became an integral part of the Los Perros del Mal group. Garza lost the main event of the CMLL 72nd Anniversary Show, CMLL's most important show of the year, and as a result had all his hair shaved off. He would later hold the CMLL World Trios Championship twice more as well as winning the CMLL World Heavyweight Championship. In 2011 Garza left CMLL, opting to work for Perros del Mal Producciones, and later on for AAA. Garza died from Lung cancer on May 23, 2013. He was posthumously inducted into the AAA Hall of Fame.
