= Leyenda de Plata (2004) =

Mexican professional wrestling tournament

- Magazine advertisement for the finals of the Leyenda de Plata tournament
- Promotion: Consejo Mundial de Lucha Libre
- Date: July 16, 2004; July 23, 2004; July 30, 2004
- City: Mexico City, Mexico
- Venue: Arena México

Event chronology
← Previous; 48. Aniversario de Arena México	Next → Gran Alternativa

Leyenda de Plata chronology
← Previous; 2002	Next → 2005

The Leyenda de Plata (2004) was professional wrestling tournament produced by the Mexican wrestling promotion Consejo Mundial de Lucha Libre (CMLLl; Spanish "World Wrestling Council") that ran from July 16, 2004, over the course of three of CMLL's Friday night shows in Arena México with the finals on July 30, 2004. The annual Leyenda de Plata tournament is held in honor of lucha libre legend El Santo and is one of CMLL's most important annual tournaments.

After not holding a Leyenda de Plata tournament in 2003, it returned in 2004 with the qualifying torneo cibernetico elimination match being held on July 16, 2004. the teams were: "A", Alan Stone, Atlantis, Averno, Mephisto, Misterioso Jr., Satánico, Tarzan Boy and Virus. Team "B", Black Warrior, Perro Aguayo Jr., Emilio Charles Jr., Másacara Mágica, Místico, Negro Casas, Super Crazy and Volador Jr. The main storyline of the cibernetico was the building rivalry between Negro Casas and the recently rudo-turned Perro Aguayo Jr. Aguayo cheated to eliminate Negro Casas and along with Atlantis were the last two surviving wrestlers. On July 23, 2004 Aguayo and Atlantis wrestled in a singles match, which unlike previous years was a "best of three falls" match, that actually went to four falls before Perro Aguayo Jr. won. A week later Perro Aguayo Jr. defeated El Felino, using the victory to further the storyline with Negro Casas, Felino's brother and corner-man for the night. Following his victory Perro Aguayo Jr. broke the plaque with El Santo's mask on it, claiming that the Aguayo's were the greatest family in wrestling, refusing to accept a trophy with El Santo's name on it.

== Production ==
=== Background ===
The Leyenda de Plata (Spanish for "the Silver Legend") is an annual lucha libre tournament scripted and promoted by the Mexican professional wrestling promotion Consejo Mundial de Lucha Libre (CMLL). The first Leyenda de Plata was held in 1998 and was in honor of El Santo, nicknamed Enmáscarado de Plata (the Silver mask) from which the tournament got its name. The trophy given to the winner is a plaque with a metal replica of the mask that El Santo wore in both wrestling and lucha films.

The Leyenda de Plata was held annually until 2003, at which point El Santo's son, El Hijo del Santo left CMLL on bad terms. The tournament returned in 2004 and has been held on an almost annual basis since then. The original format of the tournament was the Torneo cibernetico elimination match to qualify for a semi-final. The winner of the semi-final would face the winner of the previous year's tournament in the final. Since 2005 CMLL has held two cibernetico matches and the winner of each then meet in the semi-final. In 2011, the tournament was modified to eliminate the final stage as the previous winner, Místico, did not work for CMLL at that point in time The 2004 edition of La Leyenda de Plata was the sixth overall tournament held by CMLL.

=== Storylines ===
The events featured a total of number of professional wrestling matches with different wrestlers involved in pre-existing scripted feuds, plots and storylines. Wrestlers were portrayed as either heels (referred to as rudos in Mexico, those that portray the "bad guys") or faces (técnicos in Mexico, the "good guy" characters) as they followed a series of tension-building events, which culminated in a wrestling match or series of matches.

== Tournament overview ==
=== Cibernetico ===
#	Eliminated	Eliminated by	Time
1	Misterioso Jr.	Super Crazy	12:36
2	Emilio Charles Jr.	El Satánico	14:18
3	Virus	Místico	17:01
4	Alan Stone	Volador Jr.	18:00
5	Máscara Mágica	Averno	20:18
6	El Satánico	Perro Aguayo Jr.	22:33
7	Super Crazy	Mephisto	24:07
8	Mephisto	Black Warrior	25:32
9	Místico	Tarzan Boy	25:28
10	Volador Jr.	Averno	26:42
11	Averno	Negro Casas	28:05
12	Black Warrior	Atlantis	29:02
13	Tarzan Boy	Negro Casas	32:31
14	Negro Casas	Atlantis	34:34
15	Winners	Atlantis and Perro Aguayo Jr.	34:34

== Results ==
=== July 16, 2004 ===
No.	Results	Stipulations
1	Flecha and Ramstein defeated Mano Negra Jr. and Zetta	Best two-out-of-three falls tag team match
2	Sangre Azteca defeated Sombra de Plata	Singles match
3	Atlantis and el Hijo del Perro Aguayo defeated Alan Stone, Negro Casas, Averno, Mephisto, Misterioso Jr., El Satánico, Tarzan Boy, Virus, Black Warrior, Volador Jr., Emilio Charles Jr., Máscara Mágica, Súper Crazy, and Místico	2004 Leyenda de Plata semi-final, 16-man torneo cibernetico elimination match
4	Rey Bucanero, Último Guerrero, and Universo 2000 defeated Blue Panther, Rayo de Jalisco Jr., and Shocker	Best two-out-of-three falls six-man tag team match

=== July 23, 2004 ===
No.	Results	Stipulations
1	Brazo de Oro Jr., Mr. Power, and Neutrón defeated Calígula, Lobo Vikingo, and Ramstein	Best two-out-of-three falls six-man tag team match
2	Misterioso Jr., Místico, and Volador Jr. defeated Nitro, Nosawa, and Sangre Azteca	Best two-out-of-three falls six-man tag team match
3	L.A. Park, Mr. Niebla, and El Satánico defeated Héctor Garza, Rey Bucanero, and El Terrible	Best two-out-of-three falls six-man tag team match
4	Black Warrior, El Canek, and Rayo de Jalisco Jr. defeated Apolo Dantés, Dr. Wagner Jr., and Universo 2000 by disqualification	Best two-out-of-three falls six-man tag team match
5	el Hijo del Perro Aguayo defeated Atlantis	2004 Leyenda de Plata semi-finals

=== July 30, 2004 ===
No.	Results	Stipulations
1	Neutrón, Sombra de Plata, and Starman defeated Flecha, Ramstein, and Súper Comando	Best two-out-of-three falls six-man tag team match
2	Alan Stone, Misterioso Jr., and Místico defeated Dr. X, Hooligan, and Loco Max	Best two-out-of-three falls six-man tag team match
3	Averno, Mephisto, and Olímpico defeated Black Warrior, Blue Panther, and Volador Jr.	Best two-out-of-three falls six-man tag team match
4	Atlantis, El Hijo del Santo, and Negro Casas defeated Héctor Garza, Rey Bucanero, and Último Guerrero	Best two-out-of-three falls six-man tag team match
5	el Hijo del Perro Aguayo defeated El Felino	2004 Leyenda de Plata finals
