= Torneo Gran Alternativa (April 1999) =

Mexican professional wrestling tournament

- Promotion: Consejo Mundial de Lucha Libre
- Date: April 2, 1999
- City: Mexico City, Mexico
- Venue: Arena Mexico

Event chronology
← Previous; Homenaje a Dos Leyendas (1999)	Next →: 43. Aniversario de Arena México

CMLL Torneo Gran Alternativa chronology
← Previous; 1998	Next → December 1999

The Torneo Gran Alternativa (April 1999) (Spanish for "Great Alternative Tournament") was a professional wrestling tournament held by the Mexican professional wrestling promotion Consejo Mundial de Lucha Libre (CMLL; Spanish for "World Wrestling Council"). The tournament was held on April 2, 1999, in Mexico City, Mexico at CMLL's main venue, Arena México. The Gran Alternativa tournament features tag teams composed of a rookie, or novato, and a veteran wrestler for an elimination tournament. The idea is to feature the novato wrestlers higher on the card that they usually work and help elevate one or more up the ranks. CMLL made the Torneo Gran Alternativa an annual event in 1995, only skipping it four times between 1994 and 2017. since it is a professional wrestling tournament, it is not won or lost competitively but instead by the decisions of the bookers of a wrestling promotion that is not publicized prior to the shows to maintain the illusion that professional wrestling is a competitive sport.

CMLL held the first of two Gran Alternativa tournaments of 1999 on April 2, 1999 in Mexico City, Mexico. In the first round two members of Los Nuevo Infernales fought each other as Rey Bucanero (teaming with Fuerza Guerrera) lost to Último Guerrero (teaming with Blue Panther). In the second round Guerrera and Panther defeated the previous year's winners Emilio Charles Jr. and Tony Rivera to earn a spot in the finals. Their opponents, Mr. Niebla and Atlantico earned their spot in the final by defeating Mr. Niebla and Atlantico as well as Shocker and Astro Rey Jr. In the finals Último Guerrero and Blue Panther defeated Mr. Niebla and Atlantico. Último Guerrero would go on to become one of the top Rudos of CMLL, forming Los Guerreros del Infierno.

== History ==
Starting in 1994 the Mexican professional wrestling promotion Consejo Mundial de Lucha Libre (CMLL) created a special tournament concept where they would team up a novato, or rookie, with a veteran for a single-elimination tag team tournament with the purpose of increasing the profile of the rookie wrestler.

CMLL had used a similar concept in August 1994 where Novato Shocker teamed up with veterans Ringo Mendoza and Brazo de Plata to defeat novato Apolo Dantés and veterans Gran Markus Jr. and El Brazo in the finals of a six-man tag team tournament. CMLL would later modify the concept to two-man tag teams instead, creating a tournament that would be known as El Torneo Gran Alternativa, or "The Great Alternative Tournament", which became a recurring event on the CMLL calendar. CMLL did not hold a Gran Alternativa tournament in 1997 and 2000 held on each year from 2001 through 2014, opting not to hold a tournament in 2015.

== Tournament background ==
Gran Alternativa participants

Rookie	Veteran	Ref(s)
Astro Rey Jr.	Shocker	
Atlantico	Mr. Niebla	
Karloff Lagarde Jr.	Apolo Dantés	
Tony Rivera	Emilio Charles Jr.	
Rey Bucanero	Fuerza Guerrera	
Starman	El Felino	
Último Guerrero	Blue Panther	
Violencia	El Satánico	

== Tournament brackets ==
Quarterfinals
Último Guerrero and Blue Panther	W
Rey Bucanero and Fuerza Guerrera
Tony Rivera and Emilio Charles Jr.	W
Violencia and El Satánico
Starman and El Felino
Atlantico and Mr. Niebla	W
Karloff Lagarde Jr. and Apolo Dantés
Astro Rey Jr. and Shocker	W

Semifinals
Último Guerrero and Blue Panther	W
Tony Rivera and Emilio Charles Jr.
Atlantico and Mr. Niebla	W
Astro Rey Jr. and Shocker

Finals
Último Guerrero and Blue Panther	W
Atlantico and Mr. Niebla

== Aftermath ==
The Gran Alternativa victory signaled the ascent of Último Guerrero through the ranks of CMLL. He became part of El Satánico's reformed Los Infernales group alongside Rey Bucanero. The group later turned on Satánico to form Los Guerreros del Infierno (The Infernal Soldiers). Guerrero and Bucaneroworked as a regular tag team throughout the 2000s, leading to them being voted the "Best Tag Team of the Decade" by the readers of the Wrestling Observer Newsletter.

Over the years Guerrero has won a multitude of championships including the CMLL World Heavyweight Championship twice, CMLL World Light Heavyweight Championship, CMLL World Tag Team Championship six times, CMLL World Trios Championship five times, NWA World Historic Middleweight Championship. He also won the (2006 International Gran Prix, as well as the 2007 version as well. Leyenda de Azul, Universal Championship in 2009 and 2014.

Atlantico, the younger brother of Atlantis achieved little of note in CMLL, leaving the company in 1999 and retiring shortly afterwards.
