= Torneo Gran Alternativa (2004) =

Mexican professional wrestling tournament

- Promotion: Consejo Mundial de Lucha Libre
- Date: August 20, 2004
- City: Mexico City, Mexico
- Venue: Arena México

Event chronology
← Previous; Leyenda de Plata	Next → CMLL 71st Anniversary Show

CMLL Torneo Gran Alternativa chronology
← Previous; 2003	Next → 2005

The Torneo Gran Alternativa (2004) (Spanish for "Great Alternative Tournament") was a professional wrestling tournament held by the Mexican professional wrestling promotion Consejo Mundial de Lucha Libre (CMLL; Spanish for "World Wrestling Council"). The tournament was held on August 20, 2004, in Mexico City, Mexico at CMLL's main venue, Arena México. The Gran Alternativa tournament features tag teams composed of a rookie, or novato, and a veteran wrestler for an elimination tournament. The idea is to feature the novato wrestlers higher on the card that they usually work and help elevate one or more up the ranks. CMLL made the Torneo Gran Alternativa an annual event in 1995, only skipping it four times between 1994 and 2017. since it is a professional wrestling tournament, it is not won or lost competitively but instead by the decisions of the bookers of a wrestling promotion that is not publicized prior to the shows to maintain the illusion that professional wrestling is a competitive sport.

The 2004 Gran Alternativa was held on August 20, 2004, and once again featured a Battle Royal between the eight rookies to determine the seeding for the tournament. Místico won the battle royal to earn the top seed for El Hijo del Santo and himself. The order of elimination for the rest of the rookies is unknown, except for Misterioso Jr. who was eliminated first, as for the elimination order of Sangre Azteca, Volador Jr., Neutron, Doctor X, El Sagrado and Alan Stone it has not been found recorded anywhere. Místico and El Hijo del Santo qualified for the finals by defeating the teams of Misterioso and Misterioso Jr. and Atlantis and Volador Jr. Último Guerrero and Doctor X qualified for the finals by defeating Último Dragón and Neutron in the first round and Shocker and Alan Stone. Místico and Hijo del Santo won the Gran Alternativa, a victory that set off Místico's rise to the top of CMLL, where he was the number one tecnico from 2006 until his departure in 2011.

== History ==
Beginning in 1994, the Mexican professional wrestling promotion Consejo Mundial de Lucha Libre (CMLL) created a special tournament concept where they would team up a novato, or rookie, with a veteran for a single-elimination tag team tournament with the purpose of increasing the profile of the rookie wrestler.

CMLL had used a similar concept in August 1994 where Novato Shocker teamed up with veterans Ringo Mendoza and Brazo de Plata to defeat novato Apolo Dantés and veterans Gran Markus Jr. and El Brazo in the finals of a six-man tag team tournament. CMLL would later modify the concept to two-man tag teams instead, creating a tournament that would be known as El Torneo Gran Alternativa, or "The Great Alternative Tournament", which became a recurring event on the CMLL calendar. CMLL did not hold a Gran Alternativa tournament in 1997 and 2000 held on each year from 2001 through 2014, opting not to hold a tournament in 2015.

== Tournament background ==
Gran Alternativa participants

Rookie	Veteran	Ref(s)
Doctor X	Último Guerrero	
Misterioso Jr.	Misterioso	
Místico	El Hijo del Santo	
Neutron	Último Dragón	
El Sagrado	Máscara Sagrada	
Sangre Azteca	Perro Aguayo Jr.	
Alan Stone	Shocker	
Volador Jr.	Atlantis	

== Tournament brackets ==
Quarterfinals
Místico and El Hijo del Santo	W
Misterioso Jr. and Misterioso
Sangre Azteca and Perro Aguayo Jr.
Volador Jr. and Atlantis	W
Neutron and Último Dragón
Doctor X and Último Guerrero	W
El Sagrado and Máscara Sagrada
Alan Stone and Shocker	W

Semifinals
Místico and El Hijo del Santo	W
Volador Jr. and Atlantis
Doctor X and Último Guerrero	W
Alan Stone and Shocker

Finals
Místico and El Hijo del Santo	W
Doctor X and Último Guerrero

== Aftermath ==
Winning the 2004 Gran Alternativa was one of the early signs of success for Místico, developing into one of the most popular wrestlers in Mexico at the time, as well as drawing a large number of sell-out crowds. He was named the Wrestling Observer Newsletter "Biggest Box Office draw of the decade for the first decade of the 21st century. He would go on to win the Gran Alternativa again as a veteran, as well as a multitude of championships as well as the masks of Black Warrior, El Hijo del Diablo, Sepulturero, Skayde, and El Oriental. He later worked for WWE under the name "Sin Cara" from 2011 to 2014, and after his return to Mexico he worked under the name Myztezis for Lucha Libre AAA Worldwide, before finally returning to CMLL in 2015, taking the name Carístico as someone else had begun wrestling as Místico.

In early 2005 the wrestling group Los Guerreros del Infierno created an affiliated group of low to mid-carders called Pandilla Guerrera (Spanish for "Gang of Warriors") which included Doctor X along with several other mid-card rudos. On 25 March 2005 Doctor X teamed up with fellow Pandilla Guerrera members Sangre Azteca and Nitro to defeat El Felino, Safari and Volador Jr. to win the Mexican National Trios Championship. Guerrero Pandilla's Trios title reign lasted 196 days before they lost to Máximo, El Sagrado and El Texano Jr. After making it to the finals of the 2005 Gran Alternativa he teamed with Universo 2000 for the 2005 Gran Alternativa. In the first round the team defeated Bronco and El Texano Jr. before losing to eventual winners Dr. Wagner. Jr. and Misterioso Jr. in the semi-final. In 2007 most members of Pandilla Guerrera broke away from Los Guerreros del Infierno, wanting to break out of their shadow and move up the rankings themselves, forming a group originally known as Rebeldes del Desierto (Rebels of the desert) but later on would become generally known as Los Guerreros Tuareg (Tuareg Warriors), or Rebeldes Tuareg. In mid-2011, Doctor X quit CMLL, looking for better opportunities. On October 11, 2011, Doctor X (real name Clemente Marcelino Valencia Nájera) was shot in the head and killed when he tried to break up a fight while attending a religious party in Santa María Aztahuacán, Iztapalapa, Mexico City.
