= Máscara Mágica =

Máscara Mágica may refer to the following wrestlers:

- Eddie Guerrero (1992)
- Antonio Gómez Medina (1993-on)
