= Torneo Gran Alternativa (2003) =

Mexican professional wrestling tournament

- Promotion: Consejo Mundial de Lucha Libre
- Date: January 1, 2003
- City: Mexico City, Mexico
- Venue: Arena México

Event chronology
← Previous; Sin Piedad	Next → Homenaje a Dos Leyendas

CMLL Torneo Gran Alternativa chronology
← Previous; 2001	Next → 2004

The Torneo Gran Alternativa (2003) (Spanish for "Great Alternative Tournament") was a professional wrestling tournament held by the Mexican professional wrestling promotion Consejo Mundial de Lucha Libre (CMLL; Spanish for "World Wrestling Council"). The tournament was held on January 1, 2003, in Mexico City, Mexico at CMLL's main venue, Arena México. The Gran Alternativa tournament features tag teams composed of a rookie, or novato, and a veteran wrestler for an elimination tournament. The idea is to feature the novato wrestlers higher on the card that they usually work and help elevate one or more up the ranks. CMLL made the Torneo Gran Alternativa an annual event in 1995, only skipping it four times between 1994 and 2017. since it is a professional wrestling tournament, it is not won or lost competitively but instead by the decisions of the bookers of a wrestling promotion that is not publicized prior to the shows to maintain the illusion that professional wrestling is a competitive sport.

The 2003 Gran Alternativa was held on January 1, 2003, and featured a Battle Royal between the eight rookies to determine the seeding for the tournament. Sangre Azteca won the battle royal, getting the number one seed for himself and Cien Caras. Order of elimination in the battle royal: #1 Marchall, #2 Loco Max, #3 Genético, #4 Ramstein, #5 Chris Stone, #6 Mr. Power and #7 Alan Stone. The final of the tournament saw Villaño IV and Alan Stone defeat Genético and Máscara Año 2000 in the final to win the tournament. Alan Stone did not receive much of a "reward" after the tournament, he continued teaming with his brother Chris Stone until the brothers left CMLL for rival promotion AAA. In contrast the rookie "loser" of the final, Genético would be repackaged as "El Sagrado" in 2003 and given a push.

== History ==
Starting in 1994 the Mexican professional wrestling promotion Consejo Mundial de Lucha Libre (CMLL) created a special tournament concept where they would team up a novato, or rookie, with a veteran for a single-elimination tag team tournament with the purpose of increasing the profile of the rookie wrestler.

CMLL had used a similar concept in August 1994 where Novato Shocker teamed up with veterans Ringo Mendoza and Brazo de Plata to defeat novato Apolo Dantés and veterans Gran Markus Jr. and El Brazo in the finals of a six-man tag team tournament. CMLL would later modify the concept to two-man tag teams instead, creating a tournament that would be known as El Torneo Gran Alternativa, or "The Great Alternative Tournament", which became a recurring event on the CMLL calendar. CMLL did not hold a Gran Alternativa tournament in 1997 and 2000 held on each year from 2001 through 2014, opting not to hold a tournament in 2015.

== Tournament background ==
Gran Alternativa participants

Rookie	Veteran	Ref(s)
Genético	Máscara Año 2000	
Loco Max	Juventud Guerrera	
Mr. Power	Máscara Mágica	
Marshall	Gran Markus Jr.	
Ramstein	Scorpio Jr.	
Sangre Azteca	Cien Caras	
Alan Stone	Villano IV	
Chris Stone	Villano III	

== Tournament brackets ==
Quarterfinals
Sangre Azteca and Cien Caras	W
Marshall and Gran Markus Jr.
Alan Stone and Villaño IV	W
Loco Max and Juventud Guerrera
Mr. Power and Máscara Mágica
Genético and Máscara Año 2000	W
Ramstein and Scorpio Jr.	W
Chris Stone and Villaño III

Semifinals
Sangre Azteca and Cien Caras
Alan Stone and Villaño IV	W
Genético and Máscara Año 2000	W
Ramstein and Scorpio Jr.

Finals
Alan Stone and Villaño IV	W
Genético and Máscara Año 2000

== Aftermath ==
Alan Stone would go on to win the Guapos U tournament to become a member of Los Guapos, but left CMLL by the end of 2004 to return to AAA and the Mexican independent circuit.

The Gran Alternativa loss did not hold back Genético, instead CMLL decided to repackage him, giving him the name "El Sagrado", a new outfit including a mask with a silver cross on it and a storyline that claimed that he was the protégé of Fray Tormenta. He would later team up with Máximo and El Texano, Jr. to win the Mexican National Trios Championship, On April 24, 2007 the team lost the Mexican National Trios Championship to Los Perros del Mal (Damián 666, Halloween and Mr. Águila) when Texano, Jr. turned on his teammates and joined Los Perros del Mal. On August 18, 2007 Sagrado became a double champion as he teamed up with Volador Jr. and La Sombra to defeat Los Perros del Mal for the Mexican National Trios Championship.

In 2015 Sagrado turned rudo and adopted a darker persona and ring gear, replacing the bright cross imagery with darker burning cross symbols on his mask and tights. He later began to team regularly with the newest version of Comandante Pierroth and Misterioso, Jr. to form a group called La Comando Caribeño ("The Caribbean Commando"), adopting a storyline allegiance to Puerto Rico. In early 2015 La Comando began a storyline rivalry with the team of Delta and Guerrero Maya, Jr. over the CMLL Arena Coliseo Tag Team Championship. On February 28, 2015 Misterioso, Jr. and Sagrado defeated Delta and Guerrero Maya, Jr. to win the championship.
