= Torneo Gran Alternativa (2005) =

Mexican professional wrestling tournament

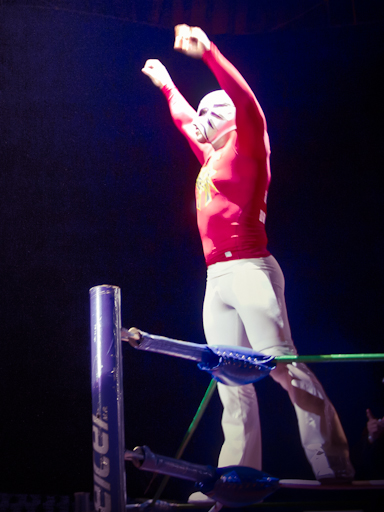
- Rookie winner La Máscara prior to a match.
- Promotion: Consejo Mundial de Lucha Libre
- Date: July 1, 2005
- City: Mexico City, Mexico
- Venue: Arena México

Event chronology
← Previous; Reyes del Aire	Next → Leyenda de Azul

CMLL Torneo Gran Alternativa chronology
← Previous; 2004	Next → 2006

The Torneo Gran Alternativa (2005) (Spanish for "Great Alternative Tournament") was a professional wrestling tournament held by the Mexican professional wrestling promotion Consejo Mundial de Lucha Libre (CMLL; Spanish for "World Wrestling Council"). The tournament was held on July 1, 2005, in Mexico City, Mexico at CMLL's main venue, Arena México. The Gran Alternativa tournament features tag teams composed of a rookie, or novato, and a veteran wrestler for an elimination tournament. The idea is to feature the novato wrestlers higher on the card that they usually work and help elevate one or more up the ranks. CMLL made the Torneo Gran Alternativa an annual event in 1995, only skipping it four times between 1994 and 2017. since it is a professional wrestling tournament, it is not won or lost competitively but instead by the decisions of the bookers of a wrestling promotion that is not publicized prior to the shows to maintain the illusion that professional wrestling is a competitive sport.

The 2005 Gran Alternativa tournament was held on July 1, 2005, and featured a Battle Royal between the eight rookies to determine the seeding for the tournament. Doctor X won the battle royal to earn the top seed for Universo 2000 and himself. Order of elimination in the battle royal: #1 El Texano Jr., #2 Nitro, #3 Apocalipsis, #4 Máximo, #5 Sangre Azteca, #6 La Máscara, #7 Misterioso Jr. The final match saw La Máscara and Atlantis defeat Dr. Wagner Jr. and Misterioso Jr.

== History ==
Starting in 1994 the Mexican professional wrestling promotion Consejo Mundial de Lucha Libre (CMLL) created a special tournament concept where they would team up a novato, or rookie, with a veteran for a single-elimination tag team tournament with the purpose of increasing the profile of the rookie wrestler.

CMLL had used a similar concept in August 1994 where Novato Shocker teamed up with veterans Ringo Mendoza and Brazo de Plata to defeat novato Apolo Dantés and veterans Gran Markus Jr. and El Brazo in the finals of a six-man tag team tournament. CMLL would later modify the concept to two-man tag teams instead, creating a tournament that would be known as El Torneo Gran Alternativa, or "The Great Alternative Tournament", which became a recurring event on the CMLL calendar. CMLL did not hold a Gran Alternativa tournament in 1997 and 2000 held on each year from 2001 through 2014, opting not to hold a tournament in 2015.

== Tournament background ==
Gran Alternativa participants

Rookie	Veteran	Ref(s)
Apocalipsis	Damián 666	
Bronco	Texano Jr.	
Doctor X	Universo 2000	
La Máscara	Atlantis	
Máxmio	Negro Casas	
Misterioso Jr.	Dr. Wagner Jr.	
Nitro	Pierroth Jr.	
Sangre Azteca	Último Guerrero	

== Tournament brackets ==
Quarterfinals
El Texano Jr. and Bronco
Doctor X and Universo 2000	W
Nitro and Pierroth Jr.
Misterioso Jr. and Dr. Wagner Jr.	W
La Máscara and Atlantis	W
Apocalipsis and Damián 666
Máxmio and Negro Casas
Sangre Azteca and Último Guerrero	W

Semifinals
Doctor X and Universo 2000
Misterioso Jr. and Dr. Wagner Jr.	W
La Máscara and Atlantis	W
Sangre Azteca and Último Guerrero

Finals
Misterioso Jr. and Dr. Wagner Jr.
La Máscara and Atlantis	W

== Aftermath ==
The Gran Alternativa win was one of the early signs of what La Máscara's career would develop into in CMLL. As part of his 17 year career in CMLL he won the mask of Averno in 2011, but ended up losing his own mask to Dragon Lee in 2016. He would also win several championships during his time in CMLL: The CMLL World Light Heavyweight Championship, CMLL World Tag Team Championship, CMLL World Trios Championship three times, Máscara Dorada and La Sombra (1) Mexican National Light Heavyweight Championship, Mexican National Trios Championship, Mexican National Welterweight Championship, NWA World Historic Middleweight Championship (1 time)

Misterioso II, later renamed Misteriosos Jr., would go on to win the 2006 Gran Alternativa with Perro Aguayo Jr. as his veteran tag team partner. He continued to be a lower ranked member of the Los Perros del Mal group until they left CMLL in October 2008, with Misterioso Jr. opting to remain with CMLL. In early 2009 Misterioso Jr. joined fa group called Poder Mexica alongside Sangre Azteca and Dragón Rojo, Jr. after Black Warrior left the group. In 2013 Misterioso Jr. began to team regularly with the newest version of Comandante Pierroth and Sagrado to form a group called La Comando Caribeño ("The Caribbean Commando"). Misterioso Jr. and Sagrado won the CMLL Arena Coliseo Tag Team Championship.
