= Torneo Gran Alternativa (June 1996) =

Mexican professional wrestling tournament

Trofeo Arena Coliseo
- Promotion: Consejo Mundial de Lucha Libre
- Date: June 7, 1996
- City: Mexico City, Mexico
- Venue: Arena México

Event chronology
← Previous; 40. Aniversario de Arena México	Next → International Gran Prix

CMLL Torneo Gran Alternativa chronology
← Previous; 1995	Next → November 1996

The Trofeo Arena Coliseo, commonly referred to as the Torneo Gran Alternativa (June 1996) (Spanish for "Great Alternative Tournament"), was a CMLL Torneo Gran Alternativa professional wrestling tournament held by the Mexican professional wrestling promotion Consejo Mundial de Lucha Libre (CMLL; Spanish for "World Wrestling Council"). The tournament was held on June 7, 1996, in Mexico City, Mexico at CMLL's secondary venue, Arena Coliseo. Like the Gran Alternativa tournament, it featured tag teams composed of a rookie, or novato, and a veteran wrestler for an elimination tournament. The idea is to feature the novato wrestlers higher on the card that they usually work and help elevate one or more up the ranks. The tournament is retrospectively considered the first of two Gran Alternativa tournaments that CMLL would hold in 1996, although only the subsequent tournament held November was officially branded a Gran Alternativa. Through that lens, it was one of only three years (as of 2024) where CMLL chose to hold such a tournament twice within a calendar year. Since it is a professional wrestling tournament, it is not won or lost competitively but instead by the decisions of the bookers of a wrestling promotion that is not publicized prior to the shows to maintain the illusion that professional wrestling is a competitive sport.

The veteran group consisted of Dos Caras, Bestia Salvaje, El Felino, El Hijo del Santo, El Brazo, Atlantis and Apolo Dantés while the rookie group included Bronco, Chicago Express, Astro Rey Jr., Olímpico, Olympus, Guerrero de la Muerte, Atlantico and Rey Bucanero. The final saw Bestia Salvaje and Chicago Express defeat Atlantis and Atlantico to win the tournament. The win did not signal anything major for Chicago Express as he remained in the low card matches while in CMLL.

== History ==
Starting in 1994 the Mexican professional wrestling promotion Consejo Mundial de Lucha Libre (CMLL) created a special tournament concept where they would team up a novato, or rookie, with a veteran for a single-elimination tag team tournament with the purpose of increasing the profile of the rookie wrestler.

CMLL had used a similar concept in August 1994 where Novato Shocker teamed up with veterans Ringo Mendoza and Brazo de Plata to defeat novato Apolo Dantés and veterans Gran Markus Jr. and El Brazo in the finals of a six-man tag team tournament. CMLL would later modify the concept to two-man tag teams instead, creating a tournament that would be known as El Torneo Gran Alternativa, or "The Great Alternative Tournament", which became a recurring event on the CMLL calendar. CMLL did not hold a Gran Alternativa tournament in 1997 and 2000 held on each year from 2001 through 2014, opting not to hold a tournament in 2015.

== Tournament brackets ==
Quarterfinals
Bronco and Dos Caras
Bestia Salvaje and Chicago Express	W
Astro Rey Jr. and El Felino
Olímpico and El Hijo del Santo	W
Olympus and El Brazo
Guerrero de la Muerte and Rambo	W
Atlantico and Atlantis	W
Rey Bucanero and Apolo Dantés

Semifinals
Chicago Express and Bestia Salvaje	W
Olímpico and El Hijo del Santo
Guerrero de la Muerte and Rambo
Atlantico and Atlantis	W

Finals
Chicago Express and Bestia Salvaje	W
Atlantico and Atlantis

== Aftermath ==
The Gran Alternativa tournament victory marked the highlight of Chicago Express' tenure in CMLL, he remained in the mid-card and would lose his three Luchas de Apuestas between 1996 and 1999 when he retired.
