= Torneo Gran Alternativa (1995) =

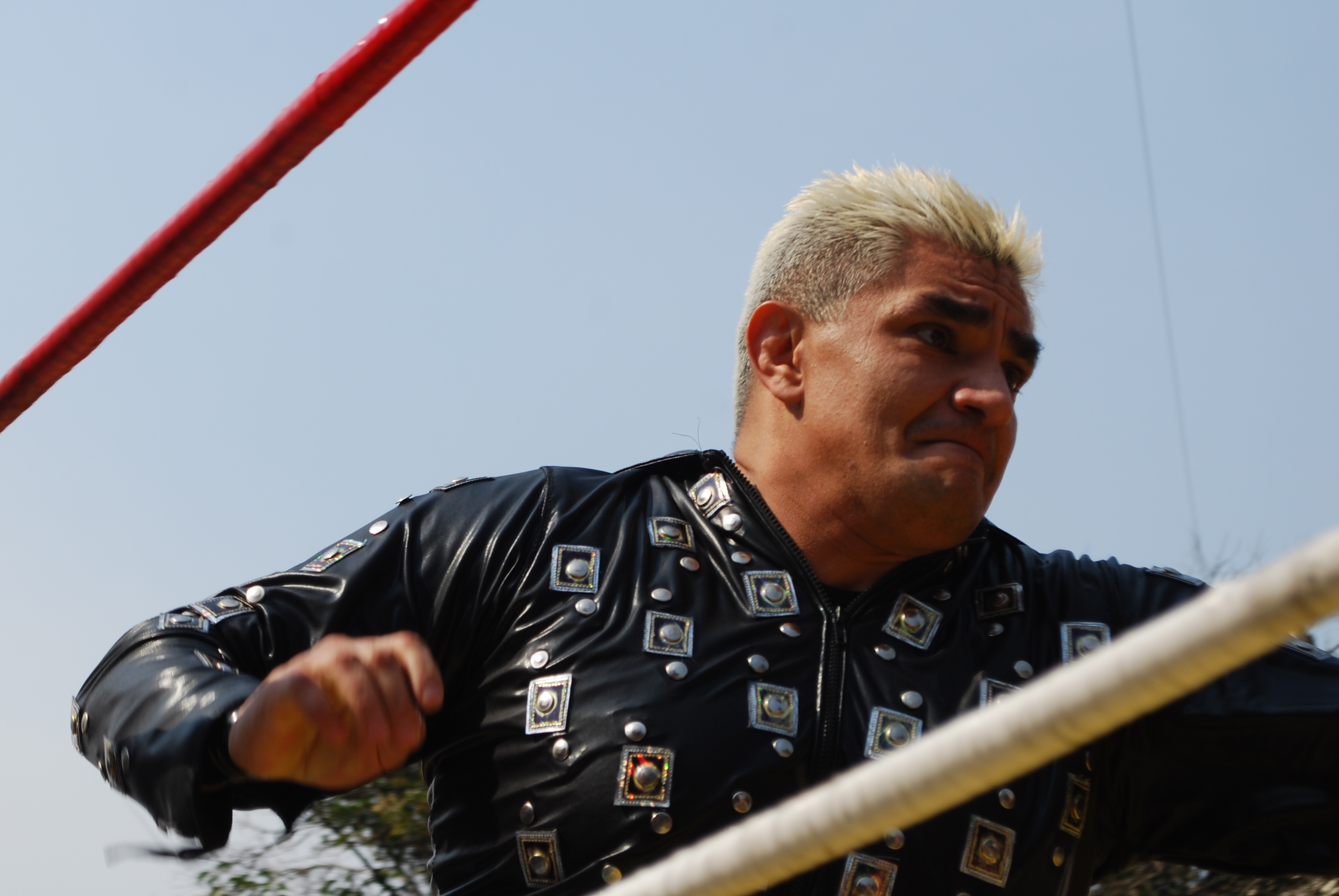
- Shocker, the rookie winner of the 1995 Gran Alternativa
- Promotion: Consejo Mundial de Lucha Libre
- Date: April 7, 1995
- City: Mexico City, Mexico
- Venue: Arena México

Event chronology
| ← Previous; 39. Aniversario de Arena México | Next → International Gran Prix |

CMLL Torneo Gran Alternativa chronology
| ← Previous; 1994 | Next → June 1996 |

The Torneo Gran Alternativa (1995) (Spanish for "Great Alternative Tournament") was the second annual CMLL Torneo Gran Alternativa professional wrestling tournament held by the Mexican professional wrestling promotion Consejo Mundial de Lucha Libre (CMLL; Spanish for "World Wrestling Council"). The tournament was held on April 7, 1995, in Mexico City, Mexico at CMLL's main venue, Arena México. The Gran Alternativa tournament features tag teams composed of a rookie, or novato, and a veteran wrestler for an elimination tournament. The idea is to feature the novato wrestlers higher on the card that they usually work and help elevate one or more up the ranks. CMLL made the Torneo Gran Alternativa an annual event in 1995, only skipping it four times between 1994 and 2017. Since it is a professional wrestling tournament, it is not won or lost competitively but instead by the decisions of the bookers of a wrestling promotion that is not publicized prior to the shows to maintain the illusion that professional wrestling is a competitive sport. The 1995 version of the tournament was held as part of CMLL's 39. Aniversario de Arena México show.

The second 'Torneo Gran Alternativa featured several participants that were also part of the first tournament, Dr. Wagner Jr. and Pierroth Jr. once again participated as the veterans while Guerrero de la Muerte, Astro Rey Jr. and Shocker returned in the rookie section. Dr. Wagner Jr. and Astro Rey Jr. earned their passage to the finals by defeating Mocho Cota and Guerrero de la Muerte in the first round and the brother team of Atlantis and Atlantico in the second. Silver King and Shocker qualified for the finals by defeating Pierroth Jr. and Chicago Express and the team of Bestia Salvaje and Corazón Salvaje. In the finals Silver King and Shocker overcame Dr. Wagner Jr. and Astro Rey Jr. to win the 1995 Torneo Gran Alternativa. Over the subsequent years Shocker became one of the main event wrestlers of CMLL, winning various singles and tag team titles.

== History ==
Starting in 1994 the Mexican professional wrestling promotion Consejo Mundial de Lucha Libre (CMLL) created a special tournament concept where they would team up a novato, or rookie, with a veteran for a single-elimination tag team tournament with the purpose of increasing the profile of the rookie wrestler.

CMLL had used a similar concept in August 1994 where Novato Shocker teamed up with veterans Ringo Mendoza and Brazo de Plata to defeat novato Apolo Dantés and veterans Gran Markus Jr. and El Brazo in the finals of a six-man tag team tournament. CMLL would later modify the concept to two-man tag teams instead, creating a tournament that would be known as El Torneo Gran Alternativa, or "The Great Alternative Tournament", which became a recurring event on the CMLL calendar. CMLL did not hold a Gran Alternativa tournament in 1997 and 2000 held on each year from 2001 through 2014, opting not to hold a tournament in 2015, but resumed their schedule in 2016.

== Tournament brackets ==
Quarterfinals
Guerrero de la Muerte and Mocho Cota
Astro Rey Jr. and Dr. Wagner Jr. | W
Atlantico and Atlantis | W
MS-1 Jr. and MS-1
Corazón Salvaje and Bestia Salvaje | W
Halcon Negro Jr. and Emilio Charles Jr.
Shocker and Silver King | W
Chicago Express and Pierroth Jr.

Semifinals
Astro Rey Jr. and Dr. Wagner Jr. | W
Atlantico and Atlantis
Corazón Salvaje and Bestia Salvaje
Shocker Silver King | W

Finals
Astro Rey Jr. and Dr. Wagner Jr.
Shocker and Silver King | W

| No. | Results | Stipulations |
|---|---|---|
| 1 | Astro Rey Jr. and Dr. Wagner Jr. defeated Guerrero de la Muerte and Mocho Cota | Torneo Gran Alternativa first round match |
| 2 | Atlantico and Atlantis defeated MS-1 and MS-1 Jr. | Torneo Gran Alternativa first round match |
| 3 | Bestia Salvaje and Corazon Salvaje defeated Emilio Charles Jr. and Halcón Negro Jr. | Torneo Gran Alternativa first round match |
| 4 | Shocker and Silver King defeated Chicago Express and Pierroth Jr. | Torneo Gran Alternativa first round match |
| 5 | Astro Rey Jr. and Dr. Wagner Jr. defeated Atlantico and Atlantis | Torneo Gran Alternativa semi-final match |
| 6 | Shocker and Silver King defeated Bestia Salvaje and Corazon Salvaje | Torneo Gran Alternativa semi-final match |
| 7 | Shocker and Silver King defeated Astro Rey Jr. and Dr. Wagner Jr. | Torneo Gran Alternativa final match |
| 8 | Héctor Garza defeated El Satánico | Best two-out-of-three falls Lucha de Apuestas hair vs. hair match |

== Aftermath ==
The 1995 Gran Alternativa victory was the beginning of a long and successful career for Shocker as he worked his way up the ranks of CMLL from 1995 to 2005. He would win the mask of Rey Bucanero in July 1999 but lose his own mask to Mr. Niebla later that same year. After losing his mask Shocker developed a self-absorbed pretty boy persona, dubbing himself "100% Guapo" ("1000% Hansome") as he founded a group known as Los Guapos with Scorpio Jr. and Bestia Salvaje. Subsequently he worked for the Florida based Total Non-Stop Action Wrestling (TNA) and then for CMLL rival Lucha Libre AAA Worldwide. in 2006 he returned to CMLL where he has won the CMLL World Light Heavyweight Championship, CMLL World Tag Team Championship three times, the NWA World Light Heavyweight Championship twice and the NWA World Historic Light Heavyweight Championship.
