= Torneo Gran Alternativa (December 1999) =

Mexican professional wrestling tournament

- Promotion: Consejo Mundial de Lucha Libre
- Date: December 17, 1999
- City: Mexico City, Mexico
- Venue: Arena Mexico

Event chronology
← Previous; Copa de Arena Mexico (1999)	Next → Juicio Final (2000)

CMLL Torneo Gran Alternativa chronology
← Previous; April 1999	Next → 2001

The Torneo Gran Alternativa (1994) (Spanish for "Great Alternative Tournament") was a professional wrestling tournament held by the Mexican professional wrestling promotion Consejo Mundial de Lucha Libre (CMLL; Spanish for "World Wrestling Council"). The tournament was held on December 17, 1999, in Mexico City, Mexico at CMLL's main venue, Arena México. The Gran Alternativa tournament features tag teams composed of a rookie, or Novato, and a veteran wrestler for an elimination tournament. The idea is to feature the Novato wrestlers higher on the card that they usually work and help elevate one or more up the ranks. CMLL made the Torneo Gran Alternativa an annual event in 1995, only skipping it four times between 1994 and 2017. since it is a professional wrestling tournament, it is not won or lost competitively but instead by the decisions of the bookers of a wrestling promotion that is not publicized before the shows to maintain the illusion that professional wrestling is a competitive sport.

The second Gran Alternativa of 1999 was held December 17, 1999, in Mexico City, Mexico and did not feature any wrestlers from the first 1999 Gran Alternativa tournament. Scorpio Jr. and Fugaz defeated Lizmark Jr. and Sombra de Plata in the first round and Negro Casas and La Flecha in the second round. El Felino and Tigre Blanco qualified for the finals by defeating Máscara Año 2000 and Sangre Azteca and the team of Ringo Mendoza and Ricky Marvin and then finally defeated the team of Scorpio Jr. and Fugaz in the final to win the Gran Alternativa tournament.

== History ==
Starting in 1994 the Mexican professional wrestling promotion Consejo Mundial de Lucha Libre (CMLL) created a special tournament concept where they would team up a novato, or rookie, with a veteran for a single-elimination tag team tournament to increase the profile of the rookie wrestler.

CMLL had used a similar concept in August 1994 where Novato Shocker teamed up with veterans Ringo Mendoza and Brazo de Plata to defeat Novato Apolo Dantés and veterans Gran Markus Jr. and El Brazo in the finals of a six-man tag team tournament. CMLL would later modify the concept to two-man tag teams instead, creating a tournament that would be known as El Torneo Gran Alternativa, or "The Great Alternative Tournament", which became a recurring event on the CMLL calendar. CMLL did not hold a Gran Alternativa tournament in 1997 and 2000 held on each year from 2001 through 2014, opting not to hold a tournament in 2015.

== Tournament background ==
Gran Alternativa participants

Rookie	Veteran	Ref(s)
La Fletcha	Negro Casas	
Fugaz	Scorpio Jr.	
Ricky Marvin	Ringo Mendoza	
Motocross	Bestia Salvaje	
Sangre Azteca	Máscara Año 2000	
Sombra de Plata	Lizmark Jr.	
Alan Stone	Apolo Dantés	
Tigre Blanco	El Felino	

== Tournament brackets ==
Quarterfinals
Alan Stone and Apolo Dantés
Ricky Marvin and Ringo Mendoza	W
Tigre Blanco and El Felino	W
Sangre Azteca and Máscara Año 2000
Sombra de Plata and Lizmark Jr.
Fugaz and Scorpio Jr.	W
La Flecha and Negro Casas	W
Motocross and Bestia Salvaje

Semifinals
Ricky Marvin and Ringo Mendoza
Tigre Blanco and El Felino	W
Fugaz and Scorpio Jr.	W
La Flecha and Negro Casas

Finals
Tigre Blanco and El Felino	W
Fugaz and Scorpio Jr.

== Aftermath ==
Tigre Blanco continued to be a regular wrestler on CMLL's mid-card, including winning the Mexican National Welterweight Championship at one point. In 2009 he lost his mask to Pólvora as he lost a Lucha de Apuestas match.

Fugaz was later given a new, masked ring personal when he was reintroduced as Ramstein in 2001. He was a regular member of both Pandilla Guerrera and subsequently Los Guerreros Tuareg. On January 6, 2014 Ramstein and El Cholo lost to Los Principes del Ring (Soberano Jr. and Star Jr.) and was forced to unmask as a result.
