= Torneo Gran Alternativa (1998) =

Mexican professional wrestling tournament

- Promotion: Consejo Mundial de Lucha Libre
- Date: June 14, 1998
- City: Mexico City, Mexico
- Venue: Arena México

Event chronology
← Previous; 42. Aniversario de Arena México	Next → Ruleta de la Muerte

CMLL Torneo Gran Alternativa chronology
← Previous; November 1996	Next → April 1999

The Torneo Gran Alternativa (1998) (Spanish for "Great Alternative Tournament") was a professional wrestling tournament held by the Mexican professional wrestling promotion Consejo Mundial de Lucha Libre (CMLL; Spanish for "World Wrestling Council"). The tournament was held on June 14, 1998, in Mexico City, Mexico at CMLL's main venue, Arena México. The Gran Alternativa tournament features tag teams composed of a rookie, or novato, and a veteran wrestler for an elimination tournament. The idea is to feature the novato wrestlers higher on the card that they usually work and help elevate one or more up the ranks. CMLL made the Torneo Gran Alternativa an annual event in 1995, only skipping it four times between 1994 and 2017. since it is a professional wrestling tournament, it is not won or lost competitively but instead by the decisions of the bookers of a wrestling promotion that is not publicized prior to the shows to maintain the illusion that professional wrestling is a competitive sport.

The 1998 Torneo Gran Alternativa tournament was held on July 14, 1998, in Mexico City, Mexico. The finals saw Emilio Charles Jr. and Tony Rivera defeat Bestia Salvaje and Guerrero de la Muerte. Unlike previous tournaments the finals was more storyline driven as Emilio Charles Jr. had been feuding with Bestia Salvaje and Tony Rivera and Guerrero de la Muerte already had a Luchas de Apuesta, hair vs. hair match scheduled. The win did not provide any extra momentum for Tony Rivera who remained in the same position for the rest of his CMLL stint.

== History ==
Starting in 1994 the Mexican professional wrestling promotion Consejo Mundial de Lucha Libre (CMLL) created a special tournament concept where they would team up a novato, or rookie, with a veteran for a single-elimination tag team tournament with the purpose of increasing the profile of the rookie wrestler.

CMLL had used a similar concept in August 1994 where Novato Shocker teamed up with veterans Ringo Mendoza and Brazo de Plata to defeat novato Apolo Dantés and veterans Gran Markus Jr. and El Brazo in the finals of a six-man tag team tournament. CMLL would later modify the concept to two-man tag teams instead, creating a tournament that would be known as El Torneo Gran Alternativa, or "The Great Alternative Tournament", which became a recurring event on the CMLL calendar. CMLL did not hold a Gran Alternativa tournament in 1997 and 2000 held on each year from 2001 through 2014, opting not to hold a tournament in 2015.

== Tournaments ==
Sources have not documented the initial rounds of the 1998 Torneo Gran Alternativa, thus it is unclear which teams Emilio Charles Jr. (veteran)/Tony Rivera (rookie) and Bestia Salvaje (veteran)/Guerrero de la Muerte (rookie) defeated to qualify for the finals. The finals saw Charles Jr. and Rivera defeat Bestia Salvaje and Guerrero de la Muerte, two-falls-to-one, to win the tournament.

== Aftermath ==
The 1998 Gran Alternativa tournament was part of a longer running storyline between rookies Tony Rivera and Guerrero de la Muerte, which lead to a Lucha de Apuestas, mask vs. hair match between the two that took place on July 29, 1998. Rivera won the match, forcing Guerrero de la Muerte to be shaved bald as a result. Rivera would go on to work on the CMLL mid-card for several years, until leaving the company in 2010.
