= Torneo Gran Alternativa (2006) =

Mexican professional wrestling tournament

- Promotion: Consejo Mundial de Lucha Libre
- Date: June 2, 2006
- City: Mexico City, Mexico
- Venue: Arena México

Event chronology
← Previous; International Gran Prix	Next → Reyes del Aire

CMLL Torneo Gran Alternativa chronology
← Previous; 2005	Next → 2007

The Torneo Gran Alternativa (2006) (Spanish for "Great Alternative Tournament") was a professional wrestling tournament held by the Mexican professional wrestling promotion Consejo Mundial de Lucha Libre (CMLL; Spanish for "World Wrestling Council"). The tournament was held on June 2, 2006, in Mexico City, Mexico at CMLL's main venue, Arena México. The Gran Alternativa tournament features tag teams composed of a rookie, or novato, and a veteran wrestler for an elimination tournament. The idea is to feature the novato wrestlers higher on the card that they usually work and help elevate one or more up the ranks. Since it is a professional wrestling tournament, it is not won or lost competitively but instead by the decisions of the bookers of a wrestling promotion that is not publicized prior to the shows to maintain the illusion that professional wrestling is a competitive sport.

The eight-team tournament was won by rookie Misterioso Jr. and Perro Aguayo Jr. by defeating the teams of Máscara Purpura (rookie) and Lizmark Jr., Hombre Sin Nombre (rookie) and Héctor Garza and finally the team of Nitro (rookie) and Último Guerrero. This was Misterioso Jr.'s third Gran Alternativa tournament as a rookie, and Perro Aguayo Jr.'s only Gran Alternativa win of his career.

== Background ==
Starting in 1994 the Mexican professional wrestling promotion Consejo Mundial de Lucha Libre (CMLL) created a special tournament concept where they would team up a novato, or rookie, with a veteran for a single-elimination tag team tournament with the purpose of increasing the profile of the rookie wrestler.

CMLL had used a similar concept in August 1994 where Novato Shocker teamed up with veterans Ringo Mendoza and Brazo de Plata to defeat novato Apolo Dantés and veterans Gran Markus Jr. and El Brazo in the finals of a six-man tag team tournament. CMLL would later modify the concept to two-man tag teams instead, creating a tournament that would be known as El Torneo Gran Alternativa, or "The Great Alternative Tournament", which became a recurring event on the CMLL calendar.

== Tournament background ==
Gran Alternativa participants

Rookie	Veteran	Ref(s)
Hombre Sin Nombre	Héctor Garza	
Loco Max	Rey Bucanero	
Máscara Purpura	Lizmark Jr.	
Máximo	Negro Casas	
Misterioso Jr.	Perro Aguayo Jr.	
Nitro	Último Guerrero	
Texano Jr.	Heavy Metal	
Volador Jr.	Dos Caras Jr.	

== Tournament results ==
The 2006 Gran Alternativa was held on June 2, 2006 and unlike previous events did not feature a seeding battle royal among the rookie competitors. Último Guerrero and Nitro defeated Dos Caras Jr. and Volador Jr. in the first round and Rey Bucanero and Loco Max to earn a spot in the finals. Perro Aguayo Jr. and Misterioso Jr. first defeated Lizmark Jr. and Máscara Purpura, then defeated Héctor Garza and Hombre Sin Nombre and finally defeated Guerrero and Nitro to win the Gran Alternativa.

=== Tournament brackets ===
Quarterfinals
Máximo and Negro Casas
Hombre Sin Nombre and Héctor Garza	W
Misterioso Jr. and Perro Aguayo Jr.	W
Máscara Purpura and Lizmark Jr.
El Texano Jr. and Heavy Metal
Loco Max and Rey Bucanero	W
Volador Jr. and Dos Caras Jr.
Nitro and Último Guerrero

Semifinals
Hombre Sin Nombre and Héctor Garza
Misterioso Jr. and Perro Aguayo Jr.	W
Loco Max and Rey Bucanero
Nitro and Último Guerrero	W

Finals
Misterioso Jr. and Perro Aguayo Jr.	W
Nitro and Último Guerrero

== Aftermath ==
Misterioso Jr. continued to be a lower ranked member of the Los Perros del Mal group until they left CMLL in October 2008, with Misterioso Jr. opting to remain with CMLL. In early 2009 Misterioso Jr. joined fa group called Poder Mexica alongside Sangre Azteca and Dragón Rojo, Jr. after Black Warrior left the group. In 2013 Misterioso Jr. began to team regularly with the newest version of Comandante Pierroth and Sagrado to form a group called La Comando Caribeño ("The Caribbean Commando"). Misterioso Jr. and Sagrado won the CMLL Arena Coliseo Tag Team Championship.

In 2008 Nitro formed a group called Los Guerreros Tuareg, leading the group that at some point included co-leader Arkangel de la Muerte, Hooligan, Skándalo, Doctor X, Sangre Azteca, Ramstein, Koreano and Loco Max.
