= Karloff Lagarde Jr. =

Mexican professional wrestler (1970–2024)

Personal information
- Born: César Baltazar de Lucio Valencia; October 21, 1970 Mexico
- Died: December 13, 2024 (aged 54)

Professional wrestling career
- Ring name: Karloff Lagarde Jr.
- Billed height: 1.74 m (5 ft 9 in)
- Billed weight: 85 kg (187 lb)
- Trained by: Karloff Lagarde; Ham Lee; El Canek; Ray Mendoza; Villano I; Leopardo Negro; Yamato; Gran Hamada
- Debut: October 11, 1992

César Baltazar de Lucio Valencia (October 21, 1970 – December 13, 2024) was a Mexican professional wrestler best known under the ring name Karloff Lagarde Jr. Despite his ring name, he was not the son of Karloff Lagarde, but his nephew. Lucio was a CMLL World Welterweight Champion and Mexican National Welterweight Champion. In his later years, he made limited appearances for International Wrestling Revolution Group (IWRG) in Mexico.

== Life and career ==
César Lucio grew up admiring his uncle, professional wrestler Karloff Lagarde who was one of the top names in Mexico in the 1960s and 1970s. When Lucio decided to turn professional he was trained by his uncle as well as Ham Lee, El Canek, Ray Mendoza, Villano I, Leopardo Negro, Yamato and Gran Hamada due to Lagarde's connections in the professional wrestling world. His uncle also gave him permission to use the ring name "Karloff Lagarde Jr." Lagarde made his debut in 1992 and soon began working for the Universal Wrestling Association. On December 14, 1993 Lagarde defeated Celestial for the UWA World Welterweight Championship. Lagarde held the title until May 25, 1995 when he lost it to Hijo del Santo. In 1995 the UWA closed and Lagarde moved on to Asistencia Asesoría y Administración (AAA) for a brief stop, teaming with Mr. Condor and Perro Silva losing to Las Gemas del Ring (Brillante, Diamante and Zafiro) at Triplemanía III-B.

After Triplemania, Lagarde began working for Consejo Mundial de Lucha Libre (CMLL), the promotion that his uncle also worked for in the 1960s and 1970s. On September 1, 1995 Lagarde teamed with Scorpio Jr. in a "Second Generation Tag Team tournament"; the team lost in the first round to El Hijo del Solitario and Negro Casas. A few months later Lagarde participated in La Copa Junior, losing in the first round to Rayo de Jalisco Jr. Lagarde teamed up with Satánico to participate in the 1996 Gran Alternativa. The team defeated El Felino and Astro Rey Jr. in the first round, but lost to eventual winners Emilio Charles Jr. and Rey Bucanero in the second round of the tournament. At CMLL's 64th Anniversary Show Lagarde, Valentin Mayo and Halcon Negro teamed up to defeat Olímpico, Ultraman Jr. and Tony Rivera. On February 6, 1998 Lagarde defeated Máscara Mágica to win the CMLL World Welterweight Championship. In 1998 Lagarde participated in the first ever Leyenda de Plata tournament but did not make it to the final. On September 15, 1998 Olímpico defeated Lagarde to win the CMLL World Welterweight Championship, ending Lagarde's reign after just over seven months. In 1999 Lagarde and Apolo Dantés teamed up for the Gran Alternativa but lost in the first round to Shocker and Astro Rey Jr. On October 23, 2000 Lagarde defeated Astro Rey Jr. to win the Mexican National Welterweight Championship on a show in Puebla, Puebla. Lagarde held the Mexican Welterweight Championship for almost six months, making one successful title defense before losing the title to Tigre Blanco on April 17, 2001. Lagarde kept working for CMLL until mid-2002 when he disappeared from the wrestling scene. Lagarde either went into retirement or began working under a mask, keeping his true identity hidden. Lagarde was not heard from until 2008 when he made a couple of appearances for International Wrestling Revolution Group (IWRG), including their annual Rey del Ring tournament in 2008. Lagarde eliminated Gemelo Fantastico I and Arlequin before being eliminated by eventual winner Scorpio Jr.

Lagarde died on December 13, 2024, at the age of 54.

== Championships and accomplishments ==
- Consejo Mundial de Lucha Libre
  - CMLL World Welterweight Championship (1 time)
  - Mexican National Welterweight Championship (1 time)
- Universal Lucha Libre
  - UWF Super Welterweight Championship (1 time)
- Universal Wrestling Association
  - UWA World Welterweight Championship (1 time)

== Luchas de Apuestas record ==
Winner (wager)	Loser (wager)	Location	Event	Date	Notes
Karloff Lagarde Jr. (hair)	Adrian (hair)	N/A	Live event	N/A	
Karloff Lagarde (hair), Perro Silva (mask) and Mr. Cóndor (mask)	Las Gemas del Ring (masks) (Zafiro, Brillante and Diamante)	Guadalajara, Jalisco	AAA show	April 30, 1995	
Karloff Lagarde Jr. (hair)	Ciclón Ramírez (hair)	Mexico City, Mexico	CMLL show	March 17, 1996	
Karloff Lagarde Jr. (hair)	Eclipse (hair)	Guadalajara, Jalisco	Live event	December 19, 1999	
Makabre (hair)	Karloff Lagarde Jr. (hair)	Guadalajara, Jalisco	Live event	December 26, 1999	
Astro Rey Jr. (mask)	Karloff Lagarde Jr. (hair)	Puebla, Puebla	Live event	October 30, 2000	
