= Sicodélico Jr. =

American professional wrestler (born 1976)

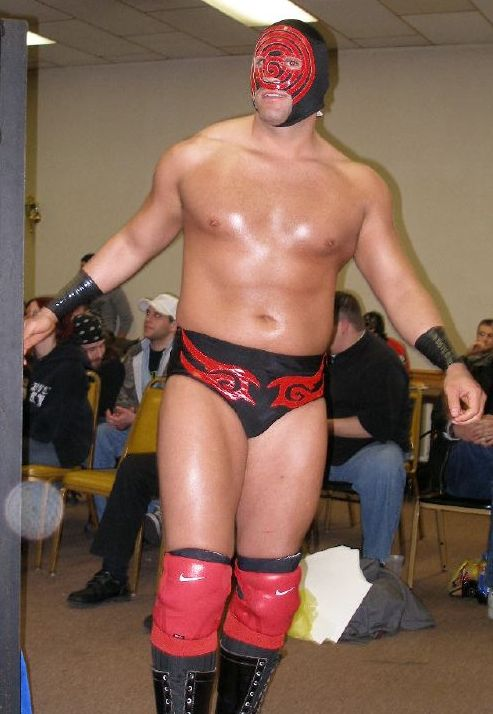
- Sicodélico Jr. in February 2007

Personal information
- Born: Aaron Rodríguez; June 13, 1976 (age 50) Los Angeles, California
- Family: Sicodélico (father); Dos Caras (uncle); Mil Máscaras (uncle); Hijo de Sicodélico (brother); Alberto Del Rio (cousin); El Hijo de Dos Caras (cousin)

Professional wrestling career
- Ring name(s): Aaron Rodriguez; El Sicodélico Jr. Espiral; Psychodelico Jr. Sicodélico Jr.
- Billed height: 1.80 m (5 ft 11 in)
- Billed weight: 86 kg (190 lb)
- Trained by: Dos Caras
- Debut: January 1998

Aaron Rodríguez (born June 13, 1976) is a Mexican-American professional wrestler, better known by his ring name Sicodélico Jr. Rodríguez is the son of Sicodélico and the nephew of Mil Máscaras and Dos Caras, and the cousin of Alberto Del Rio (Dos Caras Jr.).

== Professional wrestling career ==
=== Early career ===
Rodríguez was born on June 13, 1976, son of Pablo Rodríguez better known as professional wrestler Sicodélico. With most of the Rodríguez family involved in professional wrestling, it was no surprise that Sicodélico Jr. decided to follow in his father's footsteps.

=== Asistencia Asesoría y Administración (1998–2001) ===
After being trained by his uncle Dos Caras, Sicodélico Jr. made his debut in January 1998, initially working on the Mexican Independent circuit. In mid-1998 he was signed by Asistencia Asesoría y Administración and joined a group of wrestlers called Los Junior Atómicos, that already included La Parka Jr., Perro Aguayo Jr. and Máscara Sagrada Jr. Sicodélico Jr. only stayed with AAA for a year as he was replaced in the group by Blue Demon Jr.

=== Consejo Mundial de Lucha Libre (2001–2003) ===
In 2001, Sicodélico Jr. signed a contract with the other big wrestling promotion in Mexico Consejo Mundial de Lucha Libre (CMLL) and started working as an opening match wrestler. In August 2001, Sicodélico Jr. was teamed up with veteran Olímpico to compete in that year's Torneo Gran Alternativa, where a newcomer and an established star team together in an elimination tournament. The team qualified for the final by defeating the teams of Gran Markus Jr. and Doctor X and Blue Panther and Virus. On August 14, 2001, Sicodélico Jr. and Olímpico met and defeated the team of Black Warrior and Sangre Azteca in the finals to win the 2001 tournament. Following his win Sicodélico Jr. made a few main event appearances on lesser CMLL shows but did not attain much else over the next couple of years.

=== Independent circuit (2003–2009) ===
By the end of 2003 Sicodélico Jr. left CMLL, working both on the Mexican independent circuit and in Japan to gain further experience. In Japan he was strongly promoted as a representative of Mexico, despite being born in the United States. In 2006 Sicodélico Jr. returned to CMLL, and also began working for International Wrestling Revolution Group as the two promotions had a talent sharing arrangement at the time. After his stint with CMLL and IWRG ended by the end of 2006, Sicodélico Jr. began focusing more on working in the United States, mainly in the Texas area where he worked for promotions such as River City Wrestling and Insanity Pro Wrestling, winning titles in both promotions. He also started working several National Wrestling Alliance promoted events, taking part in the Reclaiming the Glory tournament to crown the first NWA World Heavyweight Champion after Total Nonstop Action Wrestling was stripped of its NWA licensing agreement. In the first round he defeated a wrestler called "Roughneck" Ryan, but lost to Claudio Castagnoli on a Chikara promoted show. Sicodélico Jr. teamed with fellow luchador Incógnito and was one of three teams to vie for the vacant NWA World Tag Team Championship but did not win the title. Sicodélico Jr. also worked several shows for Chikara, including teaming with Lince Dorado and El Pantera in the first ever King of Trios tournament.

=== World Wrestling Entertainment (2009) ===
In June 2008, Sicodélico Jr. worked a dark match before a WWE Raw taping as a tryout for World Wrestling Entertainment. Sicodélico Jr. came recommended by then WWE employee Super Crazy, which landed him the tryout. On April 17, 2009, it was announced that Sicodélico Jr. had signed a WWE contract and was heading to their developmental territory Florida Championship Wrestling. After competing in a few matches unmasked under the ring name Aaron Rodriguez, he soon began wearing his mask again and adopted the ring name Espiral. On September 15, 2009, Rodríquez was released from his WWE development contract.

=== Return to Independent Circuit (2009–present) ===
He has since made his return to the independent circuit in the NWA, challenging Blue Demon Jr. for the NWA World Heavyweight Championship on February 26 at Robstown, Texas, but lost the match. He has also been mainly working in the San Antonio based River City Wrestling. Recently turning rudo on his once best friend Skayde.

=== World Wrestling League (2013–present) ===
On 21 April 2013, Sicodélico Jr. made his debut for World Wrestling League promotion where he successfully defended his Zero1 Mexico Title in a Four Way Match against Axxel, El Hijo de Rey Misterio and Octagon Jr. On 7 March 2014, Sicodélico Jr. teamed with El Hijo de Dos Caras as they lost to Los Mamitos (Mr. E and Sexy B). On 6 January 2015, Sicodélico Jr. teamed with Alberto Del Rio and El Hijo de Dos Caras and were unsuccessful in challenging WWL Trios Championship against Dennis Riveraß, Noel Rodriguez and Stefano.

== Wrestling family ==
Sicodélico Jr. is part of a large Luchador family, his father is Sicodélico and his brother wrestles as El Hijo de Sicodélico (the son of Sicodélico). His uncles are Lucha Libre star Mil Mascaras, Dos Caras and Black Gordman. He is the cousin of Alberto Del Rio (Dos Caras Jr.) and Black Gordman Jr.

== Championships and accomplishments ==
- Consejo Mundial de Lucha Libre
  - Torneo Gran Alternativa (2001) – with Olímpico
- Insanity Pro Wrestling
  - IPW World Heavyweight Championship (1 time)
- Pro Wrestling Illustrated
  - PWI ranked him #308 of the 500 best singles wrestlers of the PWI 500 in 2007
- River City Wrestling
  - RCW Cyber Championship (2 times)
  - RCW Championship (1 time)
- Zero1 Mexico
  - Zero1 Mexico International Heavyweight Championship (1 time, current)
- Other titles
  - SWC World Welterweight Championship (1 time)
