= CMLL Torneo Gran Alternativa =

Mexican professional wrestling annual tournament

Torneo Gran Alternativa
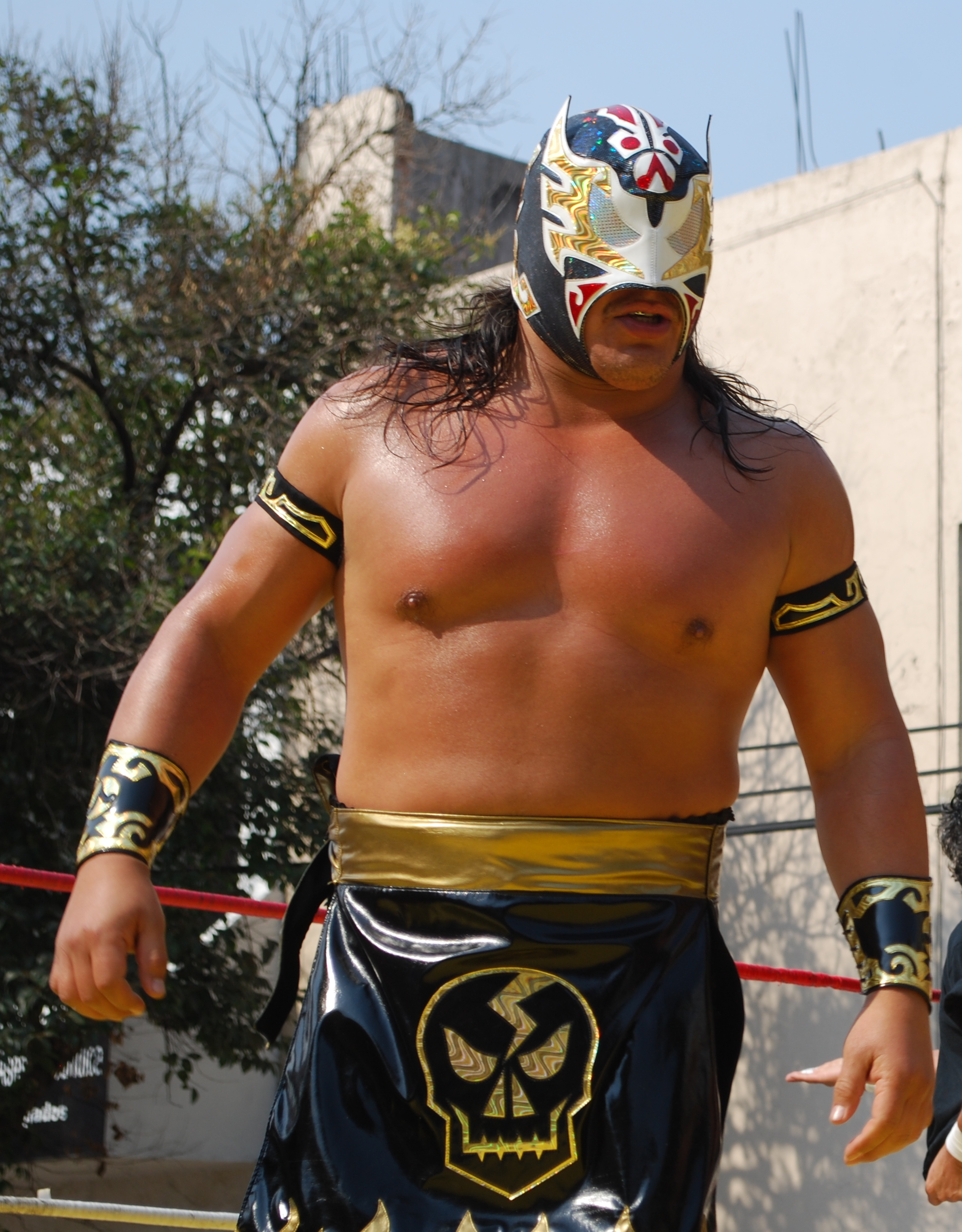
- Último Guerrero, who won the tournament both as a novato and a veteran

Details
- Promotion: Consejo Mundial de Lucha Libre
- Date established: July 13, 1994
- Current champions: Star Jr. and Valiente
- Date won: October 19, 2019
Statistics
- First champions: Negro Casas and Héctor Garza
- Most reigns: Último Guerrero/Carístico (3)

The Torneo Gran Alternativa (Spanish for "the Great Alternative Tournament") is an annual lucha libre (professional wrestling) tournament held by the Mexican professional wrestling promotion Consejo Mundial de Lucha Libre (CMLL). The tournament was not held in 1997, 2000, or 2002, but was held twice in 1996 and 1998. The most recent Torneo Gran Alternativa tournament was held in December 2021. The tournament has always been held in Arena Mexico in Mexico City, Mexico, the main arena of CMLL.

Up until 2010 the tournament format was that of eight tag teams facing off in a one night, single elimination tournament, sometimes with a match to determine the seeds for the tournament. In 2010 the field of competitors was doubled to 16 and the tournament would take place over three shows, with eight teams facing off in Block A, the other eight in Block B and the two block winners would wrestle the following week. All tournament matches except the finals are single fall matches, while the finals are a best two-out-of-three falls per lucha libre traditions.

The concept of the tournament is to team a young up-and-comer with a veteran and use the tournament to help showcase the younger talent, the young winner is often someone CMLL has plans for, although at times it has not always had the desired result.

Último Guerrero and Carístico are the only wrestlers to have won the tournament three times. Último Guerrero won in 1999 as the rookie and in 2008 and 2011 as the veteran of the team. Carístico, then known as "Místico" won in his rookie year in 2004 and then as a veteran in 2007 and again in 2017. Héctor Garza and Rey Escorpión have both won the tournament twice, once as a rookie and once as the "veteran" and Emilio Charles Jr. has won it twice as a veteran. Complete results have not been found documented for the 1998 event, but based on known information at least 187 individual wrestlers have participated in 22 tournaments as of 2017. Atlantis is both the wrestler and the veteran with most tournament appearances, 15, and has always been on the veteran side of the teams. Último Guerrero is second with 13 tournament appearances. Astro Rey Jr. and Sangre Azteca has worked the most tournaments on the novato side, five in total and none as a veteran.

== Tournament winners ==
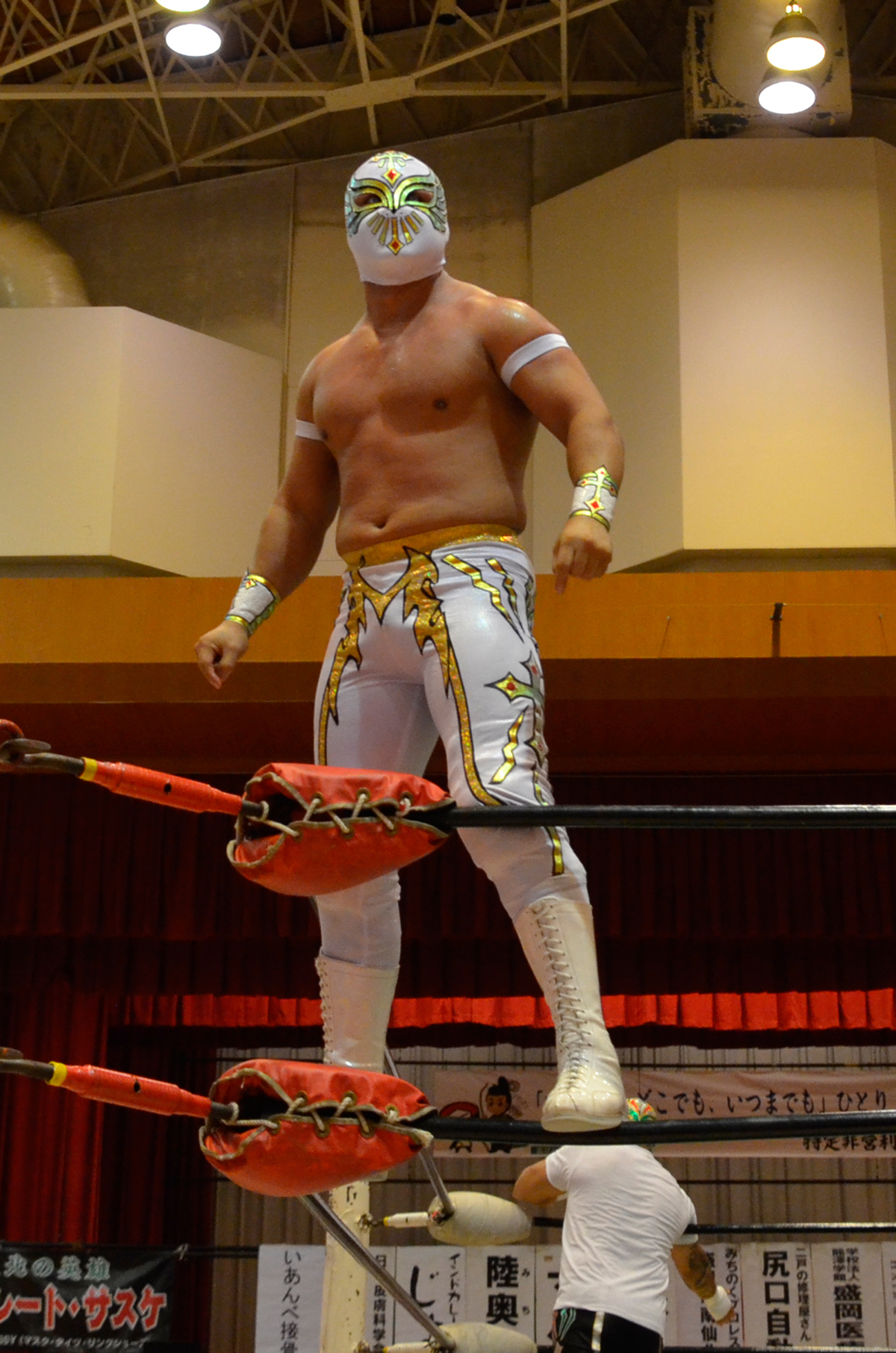
Carístico, three-time tournament winner, in Michinoku Pro Wrestling in September 2016

Year	Winners		Date	Note
Year	Rookie	Veteran	Date	Note
1994	Héctor Garza	Negro Casas	December 30, 1994	
1995	Shocker	Silver King	April 7, 1995	
Trofeo Arena Coliseo	Chicago Express	Bestia Salvaje	June 7, 1996	billed at the time as "Trofeo Arena Coliseo"; considered a Gran Alternativa by many outlets in-retrospect due to the identical gimmick
1996	Rey Bucanero	Emilio Charles Jr.	November 15, 1996	
1998	Tony Rivera	Emilio Charles Jr. (2)	July 14, 1998	
April 1999	Último Guerrero	Blue Panther	April 2, 1999	
December 1999	Tigre Blanco	El Felino	December 17, 1999	
2001	Sicodelico Jr.	Olímpico	August 14, 2001	
2003	Alan Stone	Villano IV	January 1, 2003	
2004	Místico	El Hijo del Santo	August 20, 2004	
2005	La Máscara	Atlantis	July 1, 2005	
2006	Misterioso Jr.	Perro Aguayo Jr.	June 2, 2006	
2007	La Sombra	Místico (2)	June 29, 2007	
2008	Dragón Rojo Jr.	Último Guerrero (2)	July 18, 2008	
2009	Yujiro	Okumura	September 25, 2009	
2010	Pólvora	Héctor Garza (2)	April 30, 2010	
2011	Escorpión	Último Guerrero (3)	April 8, 2011	
2012	Euforia	El Terrible	April 13, 2012	
2013	Boby Zavala	Rey Escorpión (2)	April 26, 2013	
2014	Bárbaro Cavernario	Mr. Niebla	February 14, 2014	
2016	Esfinge	Volador Jr.	May 5, 2016	
2017	Soberano	Carístico (3)	June 16, 2017	
2018	Flyer	Volador Jr. (2)	May 18, 2018	
2019	Star Jr.	Valiente	October 19, 2019	
2021	El Coyote	Euforia (2)	December 25, 2021	
2022	Panterita del Ring Jr.	Místico (4)	December 23, 2022	Místico replaced Volador Jr. in the final because Volador Jr. tested positive for COVID.
2023	Zonik	Tempestad	March 19, 2023	Promoted independently
2024	Brillante Jr.	Místico (5)	February 2, 2024	
2024 (2)	Legendario	Templario	December 27, 2024	
2025	Xelhua	Atlantis Jr.	December 19, 2025	

== Tournament history ==
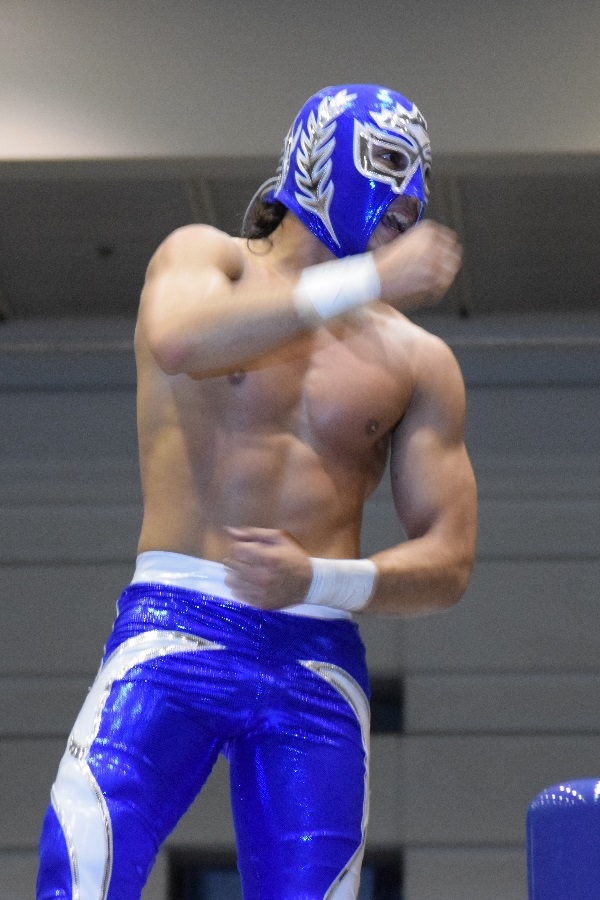
Soberano, novato winner in 2017.

Starting in 1994 the Mexican professional wrestling promotion Consejo Mundial de Lucha Libre (CMLL) created a special tournament concept where they would team up a novato, or rookie, with a veteran for a single-elimination tag team tournament. The tournament was called El Torneo Gran Alternativa, or "The Great Alternative Tournament" and became a recurring event on the CMLL calendar. In 1996 and 1999 CMLL held two tournaments, but since then has held one a year at most. CMLL did not hold a Gran Alternativa tournament in 1997 and 2000 held on each year from 2001 through 2014, opting not to hold a tournament in 2015. The 2017 Torneo Gran Alternativa was the 22nd version of the tournament.

CMLL holds other similar tournaments focusing on younger wrestlers, such as La Copa Junior, En Busca de un Ídolo ("In Search of an Idol"), Torneo Sangre Nueva ("New Blood Tournament"), and Forjando un Ídolo ("Forging an Idol"), although all of those tournaments focuses on singles competition. The "Novato/Veteran" team competition has been adopted by other Mexican wrestling companies, including International Wrestling Revolution Group (IWRG) who held the Proyeccion a Nuevas Promesas tournament in 2010 and 2011, and from 2012, on has held a novato/veteran tag team tournament in January each year under the name El Protector.

As of the 2017 tournament, 187 wrestlers competed in one or more of the tournaments held, with Atlantis holding tor record for most tournaments, a total of 15. He is also the wrestler to have worked most tournament as a veteran as all his appearances were on the veteran side. Sangre Azteca and Astro Rey Jr. (now known as Mephisto) are tied for most tournaments as a novato, with five each. Raziel is the novato that has gone the longest between his first and most recent appearance as a novato, seven years between the 2010 tournament and the 2017 tournament. Último Guerrero and Místico/Carístic are the only wrestlers to win the tournament three times, once as a novato and twice as a veteran each. Héctor Garza and Rey Escorpión are the only other wrestlers to have won the tournament as both a novato and a veteran. Silver King has appeared under three different ring names, Silver King, Bronco and Black Tiger. Several others have worked different tournaments under different names/masks, usually without CMLL officially acknowledging the connection; El Sagrado as both Genetico and Sagrado, Fuego as Flash and Fuego, Máscara Dorada as Metalik and Máscara Dorada, Tritón as Metal Blanco and Tritón, Ramstein as Fugaz and Ramstein, Titán as Palacio Negro and Titán.
