= Silver King (wrestler) =

Mexican professional wrestler (1968–2019)

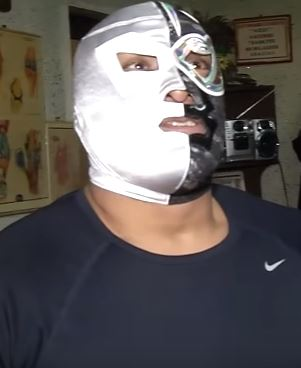
- Silver King in 2015

Personal information
- Born: César Cuauhtémoc González Barrón; 9 January 1968 Torreón, Coahuila, Mexico
- Died: 11 May 2019 (aged 51) Camden Town, London, England
- Cause of death: Heart attack
- Spouse: Xóchitl Hamada (ex-wife)
- Children: El Hijo de Silver King (son)
- Parent: Dr. Wagner (father)
- Relatives: Dr. Wagner Jr. (brother); El Hijo de Dr. Wagner Jr. (nephew); El Galeno del Mal (nephew); Rossy Moreno (ex sister-in-law)

Professional wrestling career
- Ring names: Black Tiger (III); Dr. Wagner II; Dr. Wagner Jr.; El Invasor; El Bronco; El Hermano de Dr. Wagner Jr.; Ramses; Silver Cain; Silver Kain; Silver King
- Billed height: 1.75 m (5 ft 9 in)
- Billed weight: 96 kg (212 lb)
- Billed from: Torreón, Coahuila, Mexico
- Trained by: Dr. Wagner; Grand Markus
- Debut: November 1985

César Cuauhtémoc González Barrón (9 January 1968 – 11 May 2019) was a Mexican professional wrestler. He was known best as Silver King, but also had an extensive stint as the third wrestler to portray the Black Tiger character. He was the son of professional wrestler Dr. Wagner and the brother of Dr. Wagner Jr. González worked for many years with El Texano as the tag team "Los Cowboys", winning tag team championships in both Mexico and Japan.

González worked for the Universal Wrestling Association (UWA), Consejo Mundial de Lucha Libre (CMLL), Lucha Libre AAA World Wide (AAA), World Championship Wrestling (WCW), All Japan Pro Wrestling (AJPW), New Japan Pro-Wrestling (NJPW) and various smaller federations all over the world. González also starred as the villain "Ramses" in the movie Nacho Libre, starring Jack Black. In June 2010, González began using the ring name Silver Cain (also spelled as Silver Kain) when wrestling in Mexico City as a way to be able to officially be allowed to wear his mask again. (Note: In lucha libre, a loser is often required to remove his mask permanently, as had happened with González when he lost to El Hijo Del Santo.)

In 2020, he was posthumously inducted into the AAA Hall of Fame.

== Personal life ==
César Cuauhtémoc González Barrón was born on 9 January 1968, son of Magdalena Barrón and her husband Manuel González Rivera, better known by his ring name, Dr. Wagner. César had two older brothers, Óscar and Juan Manuel, and a younger sister, Mayra. Sometime during late 1980s or early 1990s, César González married Xóchitl Guadalupe Hamada Villarreal, who is also a professional wrestler under the name Xóchitl Hamada.

In 2012, César González introduced a professional wrestler under the name "Silver King Jr.", a masked wrestler who was advertised as the son of González, but would later reveal that the first person to use the name Silver King Jr. was not his son, disassociating himself from the "fake" son. A second wrestler used the name Silver King Jr. in 2014 and 2015 until he was unmasked in a match on 11 October 2015, where he gave the name Felipe Garcia González. César González later introduced "El Hijo de Silver King" ("The Son of Silver King"), believed to be his real son, not a storyline. César González was the uncle of El Hijo de Dr. Wagner Jr. and Galeno del Mal, sons of his older brother Juan Manuel, as well as the former brother-in-law of Rossy Moreno and the Moreno wrestling family until Juan Manuel and Moreno divorced.

== Professional wrestling career ==
=== Early career (1985–1990) ===
Both César Cuauhtémoc and his brother Juan Manuel began wrestling at an early age. César made his debut in November 1985 and initially used the name El Invasor (Spanish for "the Invader"). Within a year of his debut, he changed his name and started working as the masked wrestling character Silver King. Silver King started working for the Universal Wrestling Association (UWA) in the lower matches on the cards. On 12 November 1987, Silver King wrestled in a Lucha de Apuestas (a "Bet" Match) where he put his mask on the line against El Hijo del Santo's mask. When Silver King lost he was forced to unmask and in Mexican tradition reveal his true name; it was here that it was first revealed that Silver King was one of Dr. Wagner's sons.

=== Los Cowboys (1990–1998) ===
Shortly after being unmasked Silver King formed a team with El Texano that would become known as "The Cowboys"/"Los Cowboys". In 1991 the team won their first tag team championship winning a tournament to become the first ever World Wrestling Association World Tag Team Champions. On 19 January 1992, they added the UWA World Tag Team Championship to their collection when they defeated Gran Hamada and Kendo for the title in Japan and brought the titles back to Mexico. Their run with the UWA World Tag Team titles saw them work a storyline with the Can-Am Express (initially masked and just designated "I" and "II" but later revealed to be Doug Furnas and Dan Kroffat). The storyline saw Los Cowboys lose the UWA World Tag Team title on 28 June 1992, but gain a measure of revenge less than a month later when Los Cowboys beat the Can-Am Express in a "Lucha de Apuestas" match and forced Furnas and Kroffat to unmask and reveal their true identities. During their time as double champions, Los Cowboys were invited to participante in a tournament to crown new National Wrestling Alliance (NWA) World Tag Team Champions hosted by World Championship Wrestling (WCW). The team competed at Clash of the Champions XIX and lost in a first-round match to The Fabulous Freebirds.

On 7 July 1993, Los Cowboys lost the WWA World Tag team titles to El Dandy and Corazon de Leon but regained them two months later. Their second run with the WWA World Tag Team title only lasted a month as Villano IV and Villano V took the title from them on 10 October 1993. On 31 October, only 21 days after losing the tag team titles Silver King won his first singles title when he defeated his partner El Texano for the UWA World Light Heavyweight Championship. Despite having defeated his own partner Los Cowboys did not turn on each other but kept on working together. In early 1994 Los Cowboys ended their relationship with the UWA and began working for Consejo Mundial de Lucha Libre (CMLL). Silver King defeated Black Magic for the CMLL World Heavyweight Championship on 28 July 1994. Not content to work in the singles' division Los Cowboys won the CMLL World Tag Team Championship (while Silver King still held the singles world title) on 16 December 1994, by unseating long time champions El Canek and Silver King's brother Dr. Wagner Jr. As if being a double champion was not enough Silver King teamed up with Shocker to win the 1995 Gran Alternativa tournament.

During 1995 Los Cowboys began working for the Japanese-based International Wrestling Association of Japan where they won the IWA World Tag Team Championship from Los Headhunters on 3 March 1995, in Hiroshima, Japan. The duo lost the tag team title on 20 August the same year on the undercard of the IWA's "King of Deathmatches" show. Silver King would also lose the CMLL World title and the tag team title in 1995 being defeated by Apolo Dantés and the team of Los Headhunters respectively. In February 1996 he teamed up with his brother and defeated Dos Caras and Último Dragón to win the vacant CMLL World Tag Team Championship. When WCW started signing Luchadors in 1997, Silver King joined the North American promotion and vacated the title that he and his brother still held at the time.

=== World Championship Wrestling (1997–2000) ===
==== Cruiserweight division (1997–1998) ====
Silver King joined World Championship Wrestling as a full-time wrestler in 1997 as one of the many luchadors that worked for the company in that time period. He made his WCW debut on the June 9 episode of Monday Nitro by teaming with Psychosis and La Parka against Juventud Guerrera, Super Calo and Ultimo Dragon in a six-man tag team match, which King's team lost. This marked his first appearance in the promotion since 1992. On the June 14 episode of Saturday Night, King received his first win in WCW as he teamed with Damian and Psychosis to defeat Guerrera, Calo and Dragon in a six-man tag team match. At Clash of the Champions XXXV, King teamed with Psychosis, Villano IV and Villano V to defeat the team of Hector Garza, Guerrera, Calo and Lizmark Jr. in an eight-man tag team match. He mostly found himself usually working multiple tag team, six-man and eight-man tag team matches by teaming with fellow luchadors such as Psychosis, La Parka, Villano IV and Villano V and competed against various luchadors. King's first singles match in WCW took place on the August 25 episode of Monday Nitro against Ultimo Dragon, which he lost. He made his first appearance at a pay-per-view event for WCW at World War 3, where he participated in the namesake battle royal for a future WCW World Heavyweight Championship title shot but failed to win.

King won his first match in singles competition on the January 24, 1998 episode of Worldwide by defeating Lizmark Jr. At Souled Out, King teamed with El Dandy, La Parka and Psychosis against Chavo Guerrero Jr., Juventud Guerrera, Lizmark Jr. and Super Calo in a losing effort in an eight-man tag team match. At Slamboree, King participated in a battle royal for an immediate Cruiserweight Championship title opportunity but failed to win. On the June 4 episode of Thunder, King received his first title shot in WCW against Dean Malenko for the Cruiserweight Championship but the match ended in a no contest due to interference by Chris Jericho. King received another title shot for the Cruiserweight Championship against Juventud Guerrera on the September 10 episode of Thunder, which he lost via disqualification after using a chair. This led to a rematch between the two for the title at Fall Brawl, which King lost. At World War 3, King participated in the namesake battle royal for a future World Heavyweight Championship opportunity but failed to win.

==== Latino World Order; Los Fabulosos (1998–2000) ====
At a live event on December 5, King turned on his tag team partner Lizmark Jr. during a tag team match against Latino World Order members Ciclope and Damien. After the match, King was offered a spot in LWO and he accepted, thus joining Eddie Guerrero's group which was made up of the luchadors who had always been held back in WCW. However, the group disbanded the following month as Guerrero was injured in a car accident and all the members quit the group to accept Ric Flair's offer of fighting for WCW and being promised of a better treatment than Eric Bischoff. Following the dissolution of LWO, King resumed teaming with and competing against various luchadors in the lower mid-card whilst also serving as an enhancement talent to upper mid-card wrestlers. He made his only pay-per-view appearance in 1999 at Bash at the Beach by participated in a Junkyard Invitational but did not receive any success.

On the November 13 episode of Saturday Night, King teamed with El Dandy as they unsuccessfully challenged Billy Kidman and Konnan for the World Tag Team Championship. King frequently began teaming with Dandy as the two received another tag team title shot on the March 11, 2000 episode of Worldwide against The Mamalukes (Big Vito and Johnny the Bull). On the March 15 episode of Thunder, King and Dandy began receiving a new push when they forced the ring announcer David Penzer to call their team "Los Fabulosos" before their match against Chavo Guerrero Jr. and La Parka. Los Fabulosos lost the match but they received a new manager in Miss Hancock, who provided them with a new outfit and some guidance. Los Fabulosos won a few tag team matches including their last televised match in WCW on the April 1 episode of Saturday Night where they defeated Jeremy Lopez and Tommy Rogers. Their last match in WCW was a loss to Harlem Heat 2000 (Big T and Stevie Ray) at a live event on April 1. King was released by his WCW contract on May 5.

=== Black Tiger (2001–2006) ===
After leaving WCW, he returned to CMLL and began wrestling for CMLL's Japanese affiliate, New Japan Pro-Wrestling (NJPW). In 2001, he adopted the Black Tiger character, previously used by Mark Rocco and Eddie Guerrero, making him the third person to appear under the mask, which is why he's unofficially referred to as Black Tiger III in printed sources. As Black Tiger, he wrestled several tours with New Japan starting out working a series of matches with the storyline opponent of the Black Tiger, Tiger Mask – in this case, Tiger Mask IV. Together with his brother Dr. Wagner Jr., he had an unsuccessful IWGP Junior Heavyweight Tag Team Championship challenge against the team of Jushin Thunder Liger and El Samurai in 2001.

During 2003 NJPW began to phase out most of the Luchadors they had employed over the years and thus Black Tiger began working regularly in Mexico for CMLL, this marked the first time the gimmick was used for a longer period of time outside of NJPW. Since the storyline in Mexico was that Black Tiger was Japanese they could not acknowledge the fact that he and Dr. Wagner Jr. were brothers (in Japan Black Tiger had always been portrayed by a foreigner). He usually ended up as Dr. Wagner Jr.'s back-up but on 31 March 2001, Black Tiger, Dr. Wagner Jr., and Universo 2000 won the CMLL World Trios Championship from Atlantis, Black Warrior, and Mr. Niebla. The team would hold the Trios title for over a year until being unseated on 9 July 2004, by Black Warrior, El Canek, and Rayo de Jalisco Jr. When their father (Dr. Wagner) died on 12 September 2004, Dr. Wagner Jr. was turned tecnicó (good guy) by sympathy but since González was working as Black Tiger and not publicly acknowledged as the son of Dr. Wagner he remained a rudó (bad guy). Dr. Wagner Jr.'s turn meant that Black Tiger did not have a partner or a direction, he began working for CMLL's associate International Wrestling Revolution Group (IWRG) and some smaller CMLL shows, basically in a holding pattern.

González kept working as Black Tiger even when NJPW introduced Rocky Romero as the latest Black Tiger (Black Tiger IV) but due to their working relationship with NJPW, CMLL decided that when González worked for them he needed a different "persona". He was repackaged as "El Bronco" complete with a new mask and promoted as someone new to CMLL. González made his debut as "El Bronco" teaming up with Elektro (who had just jumped from AAA to CMLL) and L.A. Park against the original members of Los Guerreros del Infierno (Último Guerrero, Rey Bucanero, and Tarzan Boy). The match was seen as a letdown as the crowd did not appreciate Elektro and did not buy into the "El Bronco" gimmick and the scheduled rematch was rebooked with Hijo de Lizmark and Místico taking over their roles in the match and González as El Bronco replacing Lizmark Jr. in the 2005 Gran Alternativa tournament where his team lost in the first round. After the Gran Alternativa González only made sporadic CMLL appearances as González. González continued wrestling as Black Tiger in IWRG and in other independent Mexican wrestling promotions. On 4 February 2006, González finally gave up the Black Tiger name as he lost a "Lucha de Apuestas" to L.A. Park and was unmasked. After losing his mask González went back to working as Silver King.

=== All Japan Pro Wrestling (2007–2008) ===
In late 2007, Silver King started working for All Japan Pro Wrestling (AJPW) where he became masked once again. In a break from tradition. Silver King did not change gimmicks but remasked under the same gimmick he was unmasked as in 1987. Silver King won the World Junior Heavyweight Championship on 1 March 2008, by defeating Katsuhiko Nakajima. He held the title for under two months as he lost it to Ryuji Hijikata on 29 April 2008.

=== Lucha Libre AAA World Wide (2008–2014, 2017–2018) ===
On 13 June 2008, Silver King made his debut with AAA, teaming with La Parka (AAA) and Chessman to face La Legion Extranjera (Electro Shock, Bobby Lashley, and Kenzo Suzuki) at AAA's Triplemania XVI show. Silver King participated in the second annual Copa Antonio Peña tournament Gauntlet match. He was the eleventh entrant and lost to eventual winner El Mesias. During a television taping on 7 February 2009, Silver King turned on his tag team partners La Parka (AAA) and X-Pac to side with Konnan's La Legión Extranjera.

After La Legión Extranjera was defeated in the main event of Triplemania XVII and Konnan lost control of AAA, Silver King went on to form the stable Los Wagnermaniacos with Dr. Wagner Jr., Electroshock, and Ultimo Gladiator. Following Electroshock's AAA Mega Championship win at Rey de Reyes in March 2010, Silver King, Electroshock, and Ultimo Gladiator all turned on Dr. Wagner Jr. and adopted the new stable name Los Maniacos. In the weeks leading up to Triplemania XVIII, it was announced that the winners of a tag team match between Silver King and Último Gladiador against La Hermandad 187 (Nicho and Joe Líder) would be given a chance to wrestle for the AAA World Tag Team Championship at Triplemania XVIII. The match between the two teams ended in a draw, leaving it undecided if both or neither teams will wrestle at Triplemania XVIII.

On 6 June 2010, at Triplemania XVIII, Silver King was officially billed as "Silver Cain", both as a reference to the biblical Cain and Abel, as well as a way for AAA to get around him wearing a mask again. The Mexican Boxing and Wrestling Commission had been giving González problems due to the fact that he had previously lost his mask and this was a way to get around it since he was allowed to wear a mask under a new character. He would only have to use the new name when wrestling in Mexico City. On that night he and Último Gladiador outlasted three other teams, pinning James Storm of Beer Money, Inc. to win the AAA World Tag Team Championship, Silver King's first AAA title. Following the match, Los Junior Capos (Máscara Año 2000 Jr. and Hijo de Cien Caras) from IWRG came to the ring to challenge the new champions for the title. On 26 June, Silver King defeated Máscara Año 2000 Jr. to win the IWRG Intercontinental Heavyweight Championship in an AAA/IWRG inter-promotional match.

Silver King went on to challenge Dr. Wagner Jr. for the AAA Mega Championship in a three-way match, which also included Vampiro, on 15 August at Verano de Escandalo, but failed to win the title, when Wagner pinned Vampiro. After the match King played an audiotape, where the late father of the two brothers claimed that King was the more talented of the two of them. This revelation led to a match on 1 October at Héroes Inmortales IV, where Wagner Jr. defeated Silver King in a singles match to retain the AAA Mega Championship.

In September 2010 Silver King and Último Gladiador had announced they were joining La Sociedad. Initially, Electroshock made no official announcement on whether he would be following them but agreed to represent the group at Héroes Inmortales V in order to get his hands on Heavy Metal, with whom he had been feuding the past weeks. However, on 14 November he announced he was not part of La Sociedad and urged Silver King and Último Gladiador to leave the group. After Electroshock turned La Sociedad down for the second time on 18 November, Silver King and Último Gladiador turned on him and beat him down with La Milicia. On 27 November Silver King officially kicked Electroshock out of Los Maniacos, while also announcing his spot in the group would be taken by a new member.

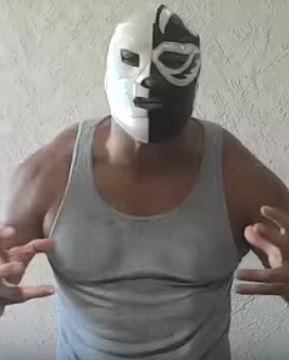
King in 2015

On 5 December at Guerra de Titanes Silver King and Último Gladiador successfully defended the AAA World Tag Team Championship in a three–way ladder match against La Hermandad 187 and fellow La Sociedad members Hernandez and El Ilegal. On 21 March 2011, Los Maniacos lost the AAA World Tag Team Championship to Extreme Tiger and Jack Evans. In IWRG, Los Maniacos was joined by Joe Líder, with whom Silver King and Último Gladiador held the IWRG Intercontinental Trios Championship from 3 March to 24 April when they lost them during IWRG's Guerra de Empresas show. After losing the title to Los Psycho Circus, King and Gladiador turned on Líder and kicked him out of the group. Shortly thereafter, King and Gladiador joined forces with Chessman to form La Maniarquía. On 18 June at Triplemanía XIX, La Maniarquía was defeated by Electroshock, Heavy Metal and Joe Líder in a Tables, Ladders and Chairs match. In April 2012, Silver King made peace with Dr. Wagner Jr. as the two came together to battle El Consejo stable. However, the alliance was short-lived as on 5 August during the main event of Triplemanía XX, Silver King turned on Wagner Jr., who, despite the betrayal, managed to defeat Máscara Año 2000 Jr. in a Mask vs. Mask match. Afterward, Silver King revealed that he had been behind El Consejo from the beginning, revealing himself as the leader of the rudo stable. However, Silver King quickly began having problems with his new stablemates, with Máscara Año 2000 Jr. asking how they could trust a man who was capable of betraying his own brother. The storyline was dropped after both Máscara Año 2000 Jr. and Toscano left El Consejo. On 8 December 2013, at Guerra de Titanes, Silver King, El Texano Jr., and El Consejo's newest member, El Hijo del Fantasma, unsuccessfully challenged Los Psycho Circus for the AAA World Trios Championship. He left AAA in 2014.

On 25 November 2017, King returned to AAA where he worked in a Bull Terrier Four Way match against Silver King Jr, La Parka Negra and La Parka. His last match with AAA was on 29 December 2018 teaming with Dave the Clown losing to La Parka and Murder Clown.

=== Later career (2014–2019) ===
After leaving AAA in 2014, Silver King worked in many independent circuit Mexican promotions. On 27 June 2015 he lost to his brother Dr. Wagner Jr at Lucha Libre Espectacular in Palmetto, Florida. He also worked in England in 2016 and 2017. On 14 March 2019, he returned to Japan where he participated in a shared event with World Wonder Ring Stardom and Tokyo Gurentai teaming with Fuerza Guerrera and Diamante losing to Ultimo Dragon, El Hijo del Santo and Shiryu.

== Nacho Libre ==
In 2005, González was cast as the villain opposite Jack Black's character in the Paramount Pictures film Nacho Libre. In the film, González wears a golden mask and outfit and plays the top luchador known as Ramses. After the film premiered, González wore the golden outfit at least once during a defense of his UWA World Junior Light Heavyweight Championship.

== Death ==
During a match in Camden Town, London, England, against Juventud Guerrera on 11 May 2019, González collapsed in the ring and died a short time later, from a heart attack at the age of 51. Following his death, his body was delayed in being transported from London to Mexico. His body arrived in Mexico City on 19 May, and then it was moved to Monterrey and later by land to Torreón, Coahuila, his native city. His funeral was held at the Funeraria Gayosso where fans were able to attend, and he was later buried at the Jardines del Tiempo in Torreón alongside his father. An autopsy confirmed that González's cause of death was due to a fulminant myocardial infarction and that there were no drugs or medications in his blood.

After González's death, it was reported that Daniel "El Satanico" Lopez, who runs the commission in Zapopan in Guadalajara, decided that shows held in that state would need two ambulances on-site, one paramedic, one doctor, and referees trained in CPR.

== Tributes and legacy ==
On 22 May 2019 a tribute in memory for González was held at the Arena Campeones de Torreón. On 3 August at Triplemanía XXVII, he was posthumously inducted into the AAA Hall of Fame as part of the 2019 class.

== Championships and accomplishments ==
- AAA
  - AAA World Tag Team Championship (1 time) – with Último Gladiador
  - AAA Hall of Fame (Class of 2019)
- All Japan Pro Wrestling
  - World Junior Heavyweight Championship (1 time)
- Consejo Mundial de Lucha Libre
  - CMLL World Heavyweight Championship (1 time)
  - CMLL World Tag Team Championship (2 times) – with El Texano (1) and Dr. Wagner Jr. (1)
  - CMLL World Trios Championship (1 time) with Dr. Wagner Jr. and Universo 2000
  - CMLL Torneo Gran Alternativa (1995) – with Shocker
- International Wrestling Association of Japan
  - IWA World Tag Team championship (1 time) – with El Texano
- International Wrestling Revolution Group
  - IWRG Intercontinental Heavyweight Championship (1 time)
  - IWRG Intercontinental Trios Championship (2 times) – with El Pantera and Pentagón Black (1) and Joe Líder and Último Gladiador (1)
  - Copa Higher Power (2004) – with NOSAWA Rongai, GARUDA and Mazada
  - Copa Higher Power (2010)
- Llaves y Candados
  - LyC Tag Team Championship (1 time) – with Dr. Wagner Jr
- Universal Wrestling Association
  - UWA World Light Heavyweight Championship (1 time)
  - UWA World Tag Team Championship (1 time) – with El Texano
- World Wrestling Association
  - WWA World Tag Team championship (2 times) – with El Texano
- Pro Wrestling Illustrated
  - Ranked No. 46 of the top 500 singles wrestlers of the PWI 500 in 2001
  - Ranked No. 228 of the top 500 singles wrestlers in the "PWI Years" in 2003
  - Ranked No. 68 of the top 100 tag teams in the "PWI Years" with El Texano in 2003

== Luchas de Apuestas record ==
| Winner (wager) | Loser (wager) | Location | Event | Date | Notes |
|---|---|---|---|---|---|
| El Hijo del Santo (mask) | Silver King (mask) | Tijuana, Baja California | Live event | 12 November 1987 | |
| Kendo (mask) | Silver King (hair) | Tijuana, Baja California | Live event | 19 February 1988 | |
| Silver King (hair) | Black Power II (hair) | Mexico City | Live event | 6 December 1990 | |
| Los Cowboys (hair) (Silver King and El Texano) | Los Crazy Stars (masks) (Crazy Star I and Crazy Star II) | Naucalpan, State of Mexico | Live event | 8 November 1992 | |
| Silver King (hair) | Loco Zandokan (hair) | Nezahualcóyotl, State of Mexico | Live event | 4 December 1992 | |
| Silver King (hair) | El Scorpio (hair) | Mexico City | CMLL 61st Anniversary Show | 30 September 1994 | |
| Silver King (hair) | Ari Romero (hair) | Mexico City | Live event | 9 February 1995 | |
| Miguel Pérez Jr. (hair) | Silver King (hair) | Mexico City | CMLL 62nd Anniversary Show | 22 September 1995 | |
| Emilio Charles Jr. (hair) | Silver King (hair) | Mexico City | CMLL 63rd Anniversary Show | 27 September 1996 | |
| Silver King (hair) | La Fiera (hair) | Mexico City | 1997 Homenaje a Salvador Lutteroth | 21 March 1997 | |
| Los Cowboys (hair) (Silver King and El Texano) | The Can-Am Express (masks) (Doug Furnas and Phil LaFon) | Naucalpan, Mexico State | Live event | 12 July 1997 | |
| L.A. Park (mask) | Black Tiger (mask) | Torreón, Coahuila | Live event | 4 February 2006 | |
| L.A. Park (mask) | Silver King (hair) | Tlalnepantla de Baz, State of Mexico | Live event | 19 December 2007 | (Note: Steel Cage Match that also included Hijo de Cien Caras, Canek Jr., Dos Caras Jr., Dr. Wagner Jr., Villano V and Mano Negra) |

== See also ==
- List of premature professional wrestling deaths
