= Dos Caras =

Mexican professional wrestler

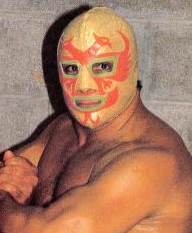
- Dos Caras, c. 1984

Personal information
- Born: José Luis Rodríguez Arellano; February 21, 1951 (age 75) San Luis Potosí City, Mexico
- Children: Alberto Del Rio (son); El Hijo de Dos Caras (son)
- Family: Mil Máscaras (brother); Sicodélico (brother); Sicodelico Jr. (nephew); Hijo de Sicodelico (nephew)

Professional wrestling career
- Ring name: Dos Caras
- Billed height: 1.80 m (5 ft 11 in)
- Billed weight: 96 kg (212 lb)
- Billed from: San Luis Potosí City
- Trained by: Rafael Salamanca; Gory Medina
- Debut: January 6, 1970
- Retired: 2020

José Luis Rodríguez Arellano (born February 21, 1951) is a Mexican professional wrestler, who wrestles under the ring name Dos Caras (Spanish for "two faces"). His most active years were in the 1970s and 1980s, and he achieved his greatest success in Mexico's Universal Wrestling Alliance (UWA), where he won the UWA World Heavyweight Championship three times. He has been called "the greatest heavyweight ever to come out of Mexico". He is the creator of the Dos Caras Clutch, a hammerlock head scissors pinning combination.

== Professional wrestling career ==
Rodríguez made his debut on January 6, 1970, at the age of 18 after training under Rafael Salamanca and Gory Medina. He adopted the ring name Dos Caras upon his debut, wearing a colorful mask with a figure of a two headed eagle on it to reflect his name. Rodríguez later stated that the name and mask was not inspired by the Two-Face comic book character but as a "two faced cheater" character (called a rudo or Heel in professional wrestling). Through connections with his older brother who had been wrestling as Mil Mascaras for some years when Dos Caras made his debut he quickly landed a regular job with the professional wrestling promotion Empresa Mexicana de la Lucha Libre (EMLL), the world's oldest and Mexico's largest promotion. In the early years he often teamed with another brother who wrestles under the name Sicodélico in low card matches while gaining experience.

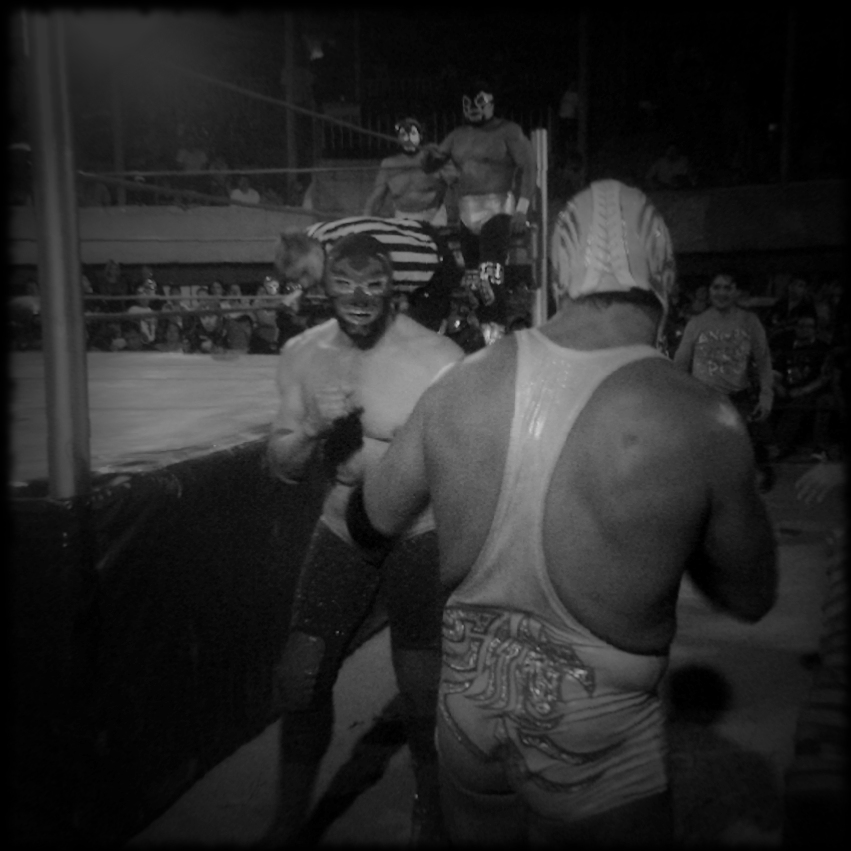
Dos Caras (left) facing off against Dr. Wagner Jr. (right) as Mil Mascaras and Canek look on.

In 1975, wrestling promoters Francisco Flores and Benjamín Mora and wrestler/trainer Ray Mendoza decided to break away from EMLL's very rigid structure where young wrestlers "paid their dues" for many years before being given an opportunity and founded their own wrestling promotion, the Universal Wrestling Association (UWA), as a direct competition to EMLL. Dos Caras was one of the young EMLL wrestlers who decided to follow Flores to the UWA, gaining the opportunity to work high up on the card. Dos Caras worked his way up the ranks and on June 20, 1978, he defeated Canek to win the Mexican National Light Heavyweight Championship, his first championship ever. Over the following 292 days Dos Caras defended the title several times, using it as a springboard up the rankings of the UWA. On April 8, 1979, Caras lost the belt to Astro Rey.

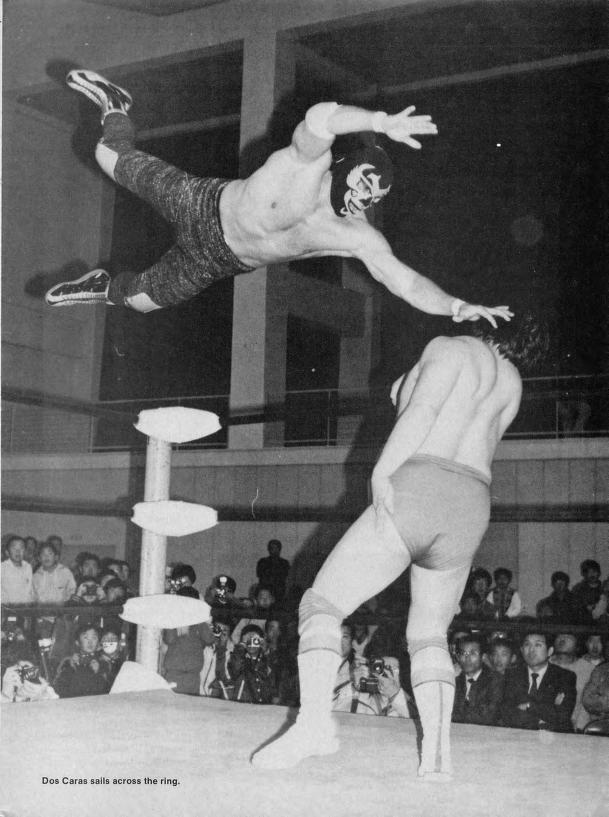
Dos Caras leaping from the top rope, circa 1983

Over the following years, Dos Caras developed both physically and style wise into a heavyweight wrestler, blending the lucha libre style of wrestling with a more mat-based, United States style wrestling style. Years later author James Molinaro cites Caras' blend of several wrestling styles as one of the reasons he called him "the greatest heavyweight ever to come out of Mexico" On February 2, 1984, Dos Caras won the highest title in the UWA as he won the UWA World Heavyweight Championship by defeating Enrique Vera in a tournament for the vacant title. Dos Caras' first run as the headliner of the UWA lasted for 119 days, until June 24, 1984, when he lost the belt to Canek. In the mid -1980s tension between EMLL and the UWA subsided and the two groups cooperated on a series of shows. This cooperation meant that Dos Caras worked EMLL shows for the first time in 10 years, teaming with Villano III and Villano V to win the Mexican National Trios Championship from Los Brazos (El Brazo, Brazo de Oro and Brazo de Plata). The title run only lasted 26 days as EMLL decided to take the belts off the UWA trio and have Los Brazos win them back on March 23, 1986. the EMLL/UWA cooperation ended not long after and Dos Caras once again focused on the UWA, defeating Canek to win his second UWA World title, a title he would hold until some time in 1987 where Canek won the title back.

In the late 1980s, Dos Caras began wrestling for the Mexico-based World Wrestling Association (WWA) where he won the WWA World Heavyweight Championship in 1989. He would hold the title for approximately a year until losing the belt to Scorpio, Jr. on September 19, 1990. in 1992 Dos Caras became a three time UWA World Champion when he defeated El Canek. Caras' third and final UWA title reign came to an end after 154 days when Canek regained the title in Naucalpan, Mexico. In 1994 the UWA closed, leaving Dos Caras free to work for other promotions, allowing him to work for EMLL (now renamed "Consejo Mundial de Lucha Libre"; CMLL) as well as various independent promotions. On March 22, 1996, Dos Caras teamed with Héctor Garza and La Fiera to win the CMLL World Trios Championship from Bestia Salvaje, Emilio Charles, Jr. and Sangre Chicana. The team held the title until early 1997 when Garza left CMLL and the title was vacated.

In the subsequent years, Dos Caras worked regularly for Lucha Libre AAA World Wide (AAA), being instrumental in the professional wrestling debut of his son Dos Caras, Jr. in AAA. He would also work for International Wrestling Revolution Group (IWRG) although he never won any championships in either promotion. Currently Dos Caras still wrestles, although on a reduced schedule, he mainly works for independent promotions, especially the UWE Legends shows. He has been vocal about not wanting to work for one of the "big two" promotions in Mexico (CMLL and AAA) as he did not feel either promotion treated a wrestler with his history and status with enough respect.

On October 7, 2010, Dos Caras made a special appearance at a WWE SmackDown live event in Mexico, where he was in his son Alberto Del Rio's corner in his match against Kofi Kingston.

On December 4, 2013, Caras, along with Mil Máscaras, returned to Japan to take part in a Tokyo Gurentai event in Tokyo's Korakuen Hall. In the main event, the two defeated Mazada and Nosawa Rongai to win the Tokyo World Tag Team Championship.

On July 2, 2017, he appeared at Impact Wrestling's Slammiversary XV in the corner of Alberto El Patron, as Alberto defeated Bobby Lashley to unify the Impact Wrestling World Heavyweight Championship and GFW Global Championship.

== Personal life ==
Rodríguez is the father of luchadors Alberto Del Rio (known as Dos Caras, Jr. while wrestling in Mexico) and Guillermo (now performing as El Hijo de Dos Caras), and the brother of luchadors Mil Máscaras and Sicodélico. He has two nephews who wrestle under the names Sicodelico, Jr. and El Hijo del Sicodelico.

== In films ==
In 2007 he appeared alongside his brother in the film Mil Mascaras vs. the Aztec Mummy.

== Championships and accomplishments ==
- Empresa Mexicana de Lucha Libre / Consejo Mundial de Lucha Libre
  - CMLL World Trios Championship (1 time) - with Héctor Garza and La Fiera
  - Mexican National Trios Championship (1 time) - with Villano III and Villano V (Note: the Mexico City Boxing and Wrestling commission sanctions the championship but it is promoted by CMLL)
- Michinoku Pro Wrestling
  - Fukumen World League (1995)
- Pro Wrestling Illustrated
  - PWI ranked him #102 of the top 500 singles wrestlers of the "PWI Years" in 2003
- Tokyo Gurentai
  - Tokyo World Tag Team Championship (1 time), current) – with Mil Máscaras
- Universal Wrestling Association
  - Mexican National Light Heavyweight Championship (1 time)
  - UWA World Heavyweight Championship (3 times)
- World Wrestling Association
  - WWA World Heavyweight Championship (1 time)
- Wrestling Observer Newsletter awards
  - Wrestling Observer Newsletter Hall of Fame (Class of 1998)

== Luchas de Apuestas record ==
Winner (wager)	Loser (wager)	Location	Event	Date	Notes
Dos Caras (mask)	Sugi Sito (hair)	N/A	Live event	N/A	
Dos Caras (mask)	Ulises Onassis (hair)	San Juan Pantitlán	Live event	August 6, 1972	
Dos Caras (mask)	Renato Torres (hair)	N/A	Live event	1975	
Dos Caras and El Cóndor (masks)	Juan Colorado and El Jíbaro (masks)	N/A	Live event	September 15, 1975	(Note: Finals of a ruleta de la muerte tag team tournament.)
Dos Caras (mask)	Mazambula El Brujo (mask)	Mexico City	Live event	December 10, 1975	
Dos Caras (mask)	Astro Rey (mask)	Naucalpan, Mexico State	Live event	April 22, 1979	
Dos Caras (mask)	El Salvaje (mask)	N/A	Live event	1982	
Dos Caras (mask)	El Brillante (mask)	Mexico City	Live event	June 5, 1983	(Note: 12 man Ruleta de la Muerte tournament.)
Dos Caras (mask)	La Pantera (mask)	N/A	Live event	1985	
Dos Caras (mask)	Scorpio (hair)	Ecatepec, Morelos	Live event	May 29, 1988	
Dos Caras (mask)	YAMATO (mask)	Naucalpan, Mexico State	Live event	August 1, 1993	(Note: Triangle match with El Canek.)
Dos Caras (mask)	Black Man II (mask)	Iztacalco	Live event	June 18, 2006	(Note: Finals of an 8-man ruleta de la muerte tag team tournament.)
