= Máscara Mágica II =

Mexican professional wrestler (born 1970)

Antonio Gómez Medina
Personal information
- Born: Antonio Gómez Medina; September 11, 1970 (age 55) Totatiche, Jalisco, Mexico

Professional wrestling career
- Ring names: Colotlán; Máscara Mágica; Máscara Mágica II; Talismán Jr.
- Billed height: 1.70 m (5 ft 7 in)
- Billed weight: 88 kg (194 lb)
- Trained by: Talismán; Diablo Velasco; Tony Salazar
- Debut: April 1989

Antonio Gómez Medina (born September 11, 1970) is a Mexican professional wrestler and professional wrestling trainer based out of Arena Coliseo Guadalajara in Guadalajara. Gómez is best known under the ring name Máscara Mágica; he is the second person to use the "Máscara Mágica" name, taking it over after Eddie Guerrero abandoned the name in the early 1990s. As Máscara Mágica, he was part of the Los Nuevo Infernales group; as part of a Los Nuevo Inferales vs. Los Infernales storyline, and lost his mask as a result of a Luchas de Apuestas match loss to Los Infernales leader El Satánico. In recent years Gómez has focused more on his training position at Arena Coliseo Guadalajara, where he also works as a booker and part-time wrestler.

== Professional wrestling career ==
Gómez grew up in a family of wrestlers, as both his father and his uncle were professional wrestlers. When Gómez decided he wanted to be a professional wrestler he trained with his uncle Arturo Beristain, who was working as "Talismán" at the time. He later received further training from Diablo Velasco and Ringo Mendoza at the Consejo Mundial de Lucha Libre (CMLL) gym in Mexico City, Mexico. Gómez made his wrestling debut as "Talismán Jr.", an masked wrestler billed as the son of "Talismán". As Talismán Jr. Gómez won the Distrito Federal Welterweight Championship, and also teamed with Kundra to win the Distrito Federal Tag team Championship.

In 1992 Eddie Guerrero left CMLL to work for AAA, showing up on TV wearing his "Máscara Mágica" mask, but quickly removing it to reveal who was under the mask. Since CMLL owned the rights to the "Máscara Mágica" gimmick they decided that someone else should play the part and chose Gómez to become the second Máscara Mágica. In 1996 Máscara Mágica took part in a 16-man tournament to crown a new CMLL World Welterweight Champion after previous champion El Pantera had left CMLL. Mágica defeated Guerrero Maya, Astro Rey Jr., and Black Panther to qualify for the final. On May 21, 1996, Máscara Mágica defeated El Felino in the final to win the CMLL World Welterweight Championship. Mágica held the championship for over a year before losing it to Guerrero de la Muerte on August 2, 1997. Máscara Mágica regained the title in January 1998, only to lose it to Karloff Lagarde Jr. a month later.

In 2000 Máscara Mágica joined Los Nuevo Infernales, filling in for an injured Tarzan Boy, teaming with Último Guerrero and Rey Bucanero. Los Nuevo Infernales were involved in a storyline with one of the original Los Infernales members El Satánico; Guerrero and Bucanero had kicked Satánico out of the group and Satánico was now looking for revenge. Satánico brought in two allies, Averno and Mephisto, to even the sides. The storyline went on for over a year, finally settling the ownership of the name Los Infernales in a seven-man steel cage match where the winning team would earn the rights to the team name. The last man in the cage would either be unmasked or have his hair shaved off. The match was the main event of CMLL's 68th Anniversary show on September 28, 2001, and saw Satánico, Averno and Mephisto win the right to the name Los Infernales, and saw Máscara Mágica unmasked as he was the last man in the cage. After the loss Guerrero, Bucanero and Taran Boy began working as Los Guerreros del Infierno, and their first act under the new name was to kick Máscara Mágica out of the group for costing them the match and the name. Máscara Mágica's on-screen role was then greatly reduced, allowing him to focus more on training young wrestlers for CMLL. He participated in the 2005 Infierno en el Ring cage match, where he was one of nine wrestlers who risked their hair or mask. Máscara Mágica saw himself defeated by Dámian 666 and was shaved bald afterward. Over the next few years, he only wrestled sporadically for CMLL, usually when they had a show at Arena Coliseo Guadalajara, where he is one of the main trainers along with Satánico and also helps book shows for CMLL.

On August 18, 2009, Mágica accompanied Misterioso Jr. to the ring as he defended the Occidente (Western) Light Heavyweight Championship against Mictlán. Despite Mágica's interference Mictlán won the match and the championship. After the match Mictlán complained about the interference and made a Luchas de Apuestas challenge for a "hair vs. hair" match with Máscara Mágica. In the weeks after Mictlán's title victory Máscara Mágica repeatedly attacked Mictlán before matches, claiming that he "did not want to see Mictlán dance". Máscara Mágica pinned Mictlán in several tag and six-man matches leading up to their Lucha de Apuesta on September 17, 2009, at Arena Coliseo in Guadalajara. Mictlán won the first fall after Máscara Magica was disqualified for excessive violence. Mágica won the second fall but Mictlán picked up the third fall to win the match. Afterward, Máscara Mágica took the clippers from the official and shaved his own hair off. In mid-2010 Máscara Mágica and Exterminador started a storyline feud against Stuka Jr. and Metal Blanco, that played out on CMLL's weekly shows in Guadalajara, Jalisco. On July 27, Stuka Jr. and Metal Blanco won a Lucha de Apuesta, masks vs. hair match. Stuka Jr. and partner originally looked like they would have to unmask after losing the third fall, but the local wrestling commission voided the results of the third fall due to cheating by Máscara Mágica and Extreminador, restarting the match. In the end Stuka Jr. and Metal Blanco won the third and deciding fall, forcing their opponents to be shaved.

== Personal life ==
Gómez is the son of "El Troyano", a professional wrestler who was active in the 1970s and 1980s and the nephew of Arturo Beristan, better known as "Talismán" and "El Hijo de Gladiador". Gómez was once married to professional wrestler Akira Hokuto, who worked in Mexico under the name "Reina Jubuki" during the time Gómez and Hokuto were married.

== Championships and accomplishments ==
- Consejo Mundial de Lucha Libre (CMLL)
  - CMLL World Welterweight Championship (2 times)
  - International Gran Prix (2002)
- Comision de Box y Lucha D.F.
  - Distrito Federal Welterweight Championship (1 time) – as Talismán Jr.
  - Distrito Federal Tag Team Championship (1 time) – with Kundra
- International Wrestling Revolution Group
  - Copa Higher Power (1999) – with Astro Rey Jr., Rey Bucanero, El Satánico, and Último Guerrero
- Mexican Independent Circuit
  - WAR Heavyweight Championship (1 time)

== Luchas de Apuestas record ==
Winner (wager)	Loser (wager)	Location	Event	Date	Notes
El Hijo del Solitario (mask)	Talismán Jr. (mask)	Nuevo Laredo, Tamaulipas	Live event	Unknown	
Máscara Mágica (mask)	El Mariachi (mask)	Cuernavaca, Morelos	Live event	Unknown	
Máscara Mágica (mask)	Rey Bárbaro (mask)	Mexico City	CMLL live event	Unknown	(Note: This was the finals of a 16 man Ruleta de la Muerte tournament.)
Máscara Mágica (mask)	Guerrero de la Muerte (mask)	Mexico City	CMLL live event	Unknown	
Máscara Mágica (mask)	Herodes (hair)	Monterrey, Nuevo León	Live event	Unknown	
El Satánico (mask)	Máscara Mágica (mask)	Mexico City	CMLL 68th Anniversary Show	September 28, 2001	(Note: Steel cage match that also included Tarzan Boy, Rey Bucanero, Último Guerrero, Averno and Mephisto)
Shocker and Máscara Mágica (hair)	Tokyo Gurentai (hair) (Takemura and Masada)	Mexico City	CMLL live event	May 21, 2002	
Máscara Mágica (hair)	Danger (hair)	Guadalajara, Jalisco	CMLL live event	May 22, 2003	
El Terrible (hair)	Máscara Mágica (hair)	Mexico City	48. Aniversario de Arena México	April 30, 2004	
Damián 666 (hair)	Máscara Mágica (hair)	Mexico City	CMLL live event	June 16, 2005	(Note: This was a steel cage match that also included Perro Aguayo Jr., Universo 2000, Halloween, Negro Casas, Heavy Metal, Héctor Garza, and Mistico)
Relámpago (mask)	Máscara Mágica (hair)	Mazatlán, Sinaloa	Live event	April 29, 2006	
El Sagrado (mask)	Máscara Mágica (hair)	Guadalajara, Jalisco	CMLL live event	April 17, 2007	
Mictlán (hair)	Máscara Mágica (hair)	Guadalajara, Jalisco	CMLL live event	September 17, 2009	
Stuka Jr. and Metal Blanco (masks)	Máscara Mágica and Exterminador (hair)	Guadalajara, Jalisco	CMLL live event	July 27, 2010	
