= Leyenda de Plata (2002) =

Mexican professional wrestling tournament

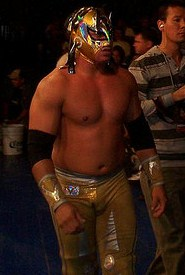
- Volador Jr., tournament participant
- Promotion: Consejo Mundial de Lucha Libre
- Date: July 26, 2002; August 2, 2002; August 9, 2002
- City: Mexico City, Mexico
- Venue: Arena México

Event chronology
← Previous; Copa de Arena Mexico	Next → CMLL 69th Anniversary Show

Leyenda de Plata chronology
← Previous; 2001	Next → 2004

The Leyenda de Plata (2002) was professional wrestling tournament produced by the Mexican wrestling promotion Consejo Mundial de Lucha Libre (CMLLl; Spanish "World Wrestling Council") that ran from July 26, 2002, over the course of three of CMLL's Friday night shows in Arena México with the finals on August 9, 2002. The annual Leyenda de Plata tournament is held in honor of lucha libre legend El Santo and is one of CMLL's most important annual tournaments.

The torneo cibernetico qualifier for the 2002 Leyenda de Plata took place on July 26, 2002 and once again saw two teams of eight face off to determine the semi-finalists. Team "A" consisted of Atlantis, Averno, Blue Panther, El Felino, Mephisto, Safari, Satánico and Virus. Team "B" was Black Tiger, Fuerza Guerrera, Hombre Sin Nombre, Negro Casas, Olímpico, Tony Rivera, Violencia and Volador Jr. The two semi-finalists were El Felino and Black Tiger, making Black Tiger the first wrestler to qualify for the semi-final more than once. On August 2, 2002 El Felino defeated Black Tiger in the semi-final and a week later he defeated Black Warrior to win the tournament.

== Production ==
=== Background ===
The Leyenda de Plata (Spanish for "the Silver Legend") is an annual lucha libre tournament scripted and promoted by the Mexican professional wrestling promotion Consejo Mundial de Lucha Libre (CMLL). The first Leyenda de Plata was held in 1998 and was in honor of El Santo, nicknamed Enmáscarado de Plata (the Silver mask) from which the tournament got its name. The trophy given to the winner is a plaque with a metal replica of the mask that El Santo wore in both wrestling and lucha films.

The Leyenda de Plata was held annually until 2003, at which point El Santo's son, El Hijo del Santo left CMLL on bad terms. The tournament returned in 2004 and has been held on an almost annual basis since then. The original format of the tournament was the Torneo cibernetico elimination match to qualify for a semi-final. The winner of the semi-final would face the winner of the previous year's tournament in the final. Since 2005 CMLL has held two cibernetico matches and the winner of each then meet in the semi-final. In 2011, the tournament was modified to eliminate the final stage as the previous winner, Místico, did not work for CMLL at that point in time The 2002 edition of La Leyenda de Plata was the fifth overall tournament held by CMLL.

=== Storylines ===
The events featured a total of number of professional wrestling matches with different wrestlers involved in pre-existing scripted feuds, plots and storylines. Wrestlers were portrayed as either heels (referred to as rudos in Mexico, those that portray the "bad guys") or faces (técnicos in Mexico, the "good guy" characters) as they followed a series of tension-building events, which culminated in a wrestling match or series of matches.

== Tournament overview ==
=== Cibernetico ===
#	Eliminated	Eliminated by	Time
1	Fuerza Guerrera	Safari	04:38
2	Safari	Violencia	09:38
3	Tony Rivera	Mephisto	13:01
4	Mephisto	Olímpico	14:06
5	Olímpico	Blue Panther	14:48
6	Virus & Volador Jr.	double pin	16:24
7	Violencia	Atlantis	18:39
8	Blue Panther	Negro Casas	20:04
9	Averno	Hombre sin Nombre	21:24
10	Hombre sin Nombre	El Satánico	21:54
11	Atlantis	Black Tiger	23:18
12	El Satánico	Negro Casas	24:07
13	Negro Casas	El Felino	24:44
14	Winners	Black Tiger and El Felino	24:44

== Results ==
=== July 26, 2002 ===
No.	Results	Stipulations
1	Neutrón and Sombra de Plata defeated Flecha and Ramstein	Best two-out-of-three falls tag team match
2	Dr. X and Zumbido defeated Pantera and Tigre Blanco	Best two-out-of-three falls six-man tag team match
3	Black Tiger and El Felino defeated Atlantis, Averno, Blue Panther, Fuerza Guerrera, Hombre Sin Nombre, Mephisto, Negro Casas, Olímpico, Safari, El Satánico, Tony Rivera, Violencia, Virus, and Volador Jr.	2002 Leyenda de Plata semi-final, 16-man torneo cibernetico elimination match
4	Los Guerreros del Infierno (Rey Bucanero, Tarzan Boy, and Último Guerrero defeated El Hijo del Santo, Máscara Mágica, and Shocker by disqualification	Best two-out-of-three falls six-man tag team match

=== August 9, 2002 ===
No.	Results	Stipulations
1	Ramstein, Sangre Azteca, and Valentin Mayo defeated Alan Stone, Chris Stone, and Neutrón	Best two-out-of-three falls six-man tag team match
2	Los Boricuas (Nitro, Veneno, and Violencia) defeated Arkángel de la Muerte, Mr. México, and Poder Mexica	Best two-out-of-three falls six-man tag team match
3	Hombre Sin Nombre, Negro Casas, and Safari defeated Juventud Guerrera, Virus, and Zumbido	Best two-out-of-three falls six-man tag team match
4	Máscara Mágica, Shocker, and Vampiro defeated Black Tiger, Dr. Wagner Jr., and Takemura	Best two-out-of-three falls six-man tag team match
5	El Felino defeated Black Warrior	2002 Leyenda de Plata finals
