= Leyenda de Plata (2000) =

Mexican professional wrestling tournament

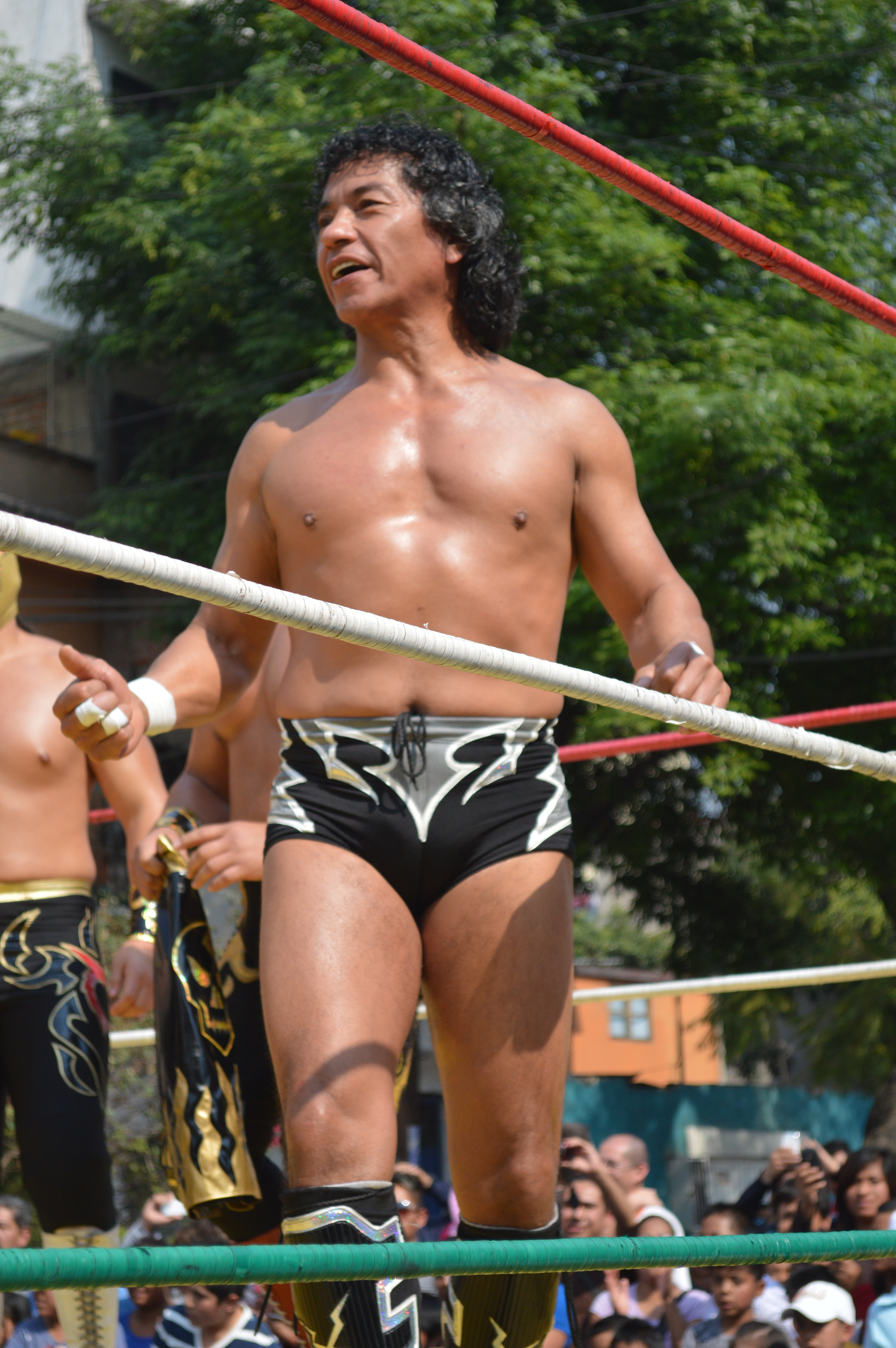
- Negro Casas, Leyenda de Plata tournament winner
- Promotion: Consejo Mundial de Lucha Libre
- Date: September 22, 2000; September 29, 2000; October 6, 2000
- City: Mexico City, Mexico
- Venue: Arena México

Event chronology
← Previous; Entre Torre Infernal	Next → CMLL 67th Anniversary Show

Leyenda de Plata chronology
← Previous; 1999	Next → 2001

The Leyenda de Plata (2000) was professional wrestling tournament produced by the Mexican wrestling promotion Consejo Mundial de Lucha Libre (CMLLl; Spanish "World Wrestling Council") that ran from September 22, 2000, over the course of three of CMLL's Friday night shows in Arena México with the finals on October 6, 2000. The annual Leyenda de Plata tournament is held in honor of lucha libre legend El Santo and is one of CMLL's most important annual tournaments.

The third annual Leyenda de Plata started with a 16-man torneo cibernetico elimination match. Unlike in 1998 and 1999, CMLL added a semi-final match to the tournament as the last two wrestlers in the cibernetico would meet in a singles match the following week. The semi-finalists were Dr. Wagner Jr. and Negro Casas, outlasting Antifaz del Norte, Atlantis, Astro Rey Jr., Black Warrior, Blue Panther, El Felino, Fuerza Guerrera, Olímpico, Rey Bucanero, Safari, Satánico, Scorpio Jr., Tarzan Boy and Zumbido. The two survivors faced off in a singles match the following week, which Negro Casas won. On October 6, 2000, Negro Casas defeated El Hijo del Santo to win the 2000 Leyenda de Plata.

== Production ==
=== Background ===
The Leyenda de Plata (Spanish for "the Silver Legend") is an annual lucha libre tournament scripted and promoted by the Mexican professional wrestling promotion Consejo Mundial de Lucha Libre (CMLL). The first Leyenda de Plata was held in 1998 and was in honor of El Santo, nicknamed Enmáscarado de Plata (the Silver mask) from which the tournament got its name. The trophy given to the winner is a plaque with a metal replica of the mask that El Santo wore in both wrestling and lucha films.

The Leyenda de Plata was held annually until 2003, at which point El Santo's son, El Hijo del Santo left CMLL on bad terms. The tournament returned in 2004 and has been held on an almost annual basis since then. The original format of the tournament was the Torneo cibernetico elimination match to qualify for a semi-final. The winner of the semi-final would face the winner of the previous year's tournament in the final. Since 2005 CMLL has held two cibernetico matches and the winner of each then meet in the semi-final. In 2011, the tournament was modified to eliminate the final stage as the previous winner, Místico, did not work for CMLL at that point in time

=== Storylines ===
The events featured a number of professional wrestling matches with different wrestlers involved in pre-existing scripted feuds, plots and storylines. Wrestlers were portrayed as either heels (referred to as rudos in Mexico, those that portray the "bad guys") or faces (técnicos in Mexico, the "good guy" characters) as they followed a series of tension-building events, which culminated in a wrestling match or series of matches.

== Results ==
=== September 22, 2000 ===
No.	Results	Stipulations
1	Olimpus and Pegaso II defeated Enemigo Publico and Fugaz	Best two-out-of-three falls tag team match
2	Máscara Mágica and Pantera defeated Dr. O'Borman Jr. and Secret Sasuke	Best two-out-of-three falls tag team match
3	Dr. Wagner Jr. and Negro Casas defeated Antifaz del Norte, Astro Rey Jr., Atlantis, Black Warrior, El Felino, Fuerza Guerrera, Olímpico, Rey Bucanero, Safari, El Satánico, Scorpió Jr., Tarzan Boy, and Zumbido	2000 Leyenda de Plata semi-final, 16-man torneo cibernetico elimination match.
4	Los Capos (Apolo Dantés, Cien Caras, Máscara Año 2000, and Universo 2000) defeated El Boricua, Gran Markus Jr., Pierroth Jr., and Violencia	Best two-out-of-three falls eight-man tag team match

=== September 29, 2000 ===
No.	Results	Stipulations
1	Alan Stone and Moto Cross defeated Mano Negra Jr. and Sombra de Plata	Best two-out-of-three falls tag team match
2	El Felino, Antifaz del Norte, and Olímpico defeated Sanshiro Takagi, Secret Sasuke and Nosawa	Best two-out-of-three falls six-man tag team match
3	Los Infernales (El Satánico, Rey Bucanero and Último Guerrero) defeated Atlantis, Villano III and Brazo de Plata	Best two-out-of-three falls six-man tag team match
4	Giganté Silva, Rayo de Jalisco Jr. and Perro Aguayo defeated Los Guapos (Scorpio Jr., Shocker, Bestia Salvaje and Zumbido)	Best two-out-of-three falls four-on-three tag team match
5	Negro Casas defeated Dr. Wagner Jr.	Best two-out-of-three falls match: 2000 Leyenda de Plata semi-final match

=== October 6, 2000 ===
No.	Results	Stipulations
1	Fire and Pierrothito defeated Bracito de Oro and Cicloncito Ramírez	Best two-out-of-three falls tag team match
2	Antifaz del Norte, El Felino, and Tigre Blanco defeated Karloff Lagarde Jr., Mr. México, and Nosawa	Best two-out-of-three falls six-man tag team match
3	El Hijo del Lizmark, Mr. Niebla, and Olímpico defeated Fuerza Guerrera, Gran Markus Jr., and Violencia	Best two-out-of-three falls six-man tag team match
4	Black Warrior, Blue Panther, and Dr. Wagner Jr. defeated Atlantis, Rayo de Jalisco Jr., and Tarzan Boy	Best two-out-of-three falls six-man tag team match
5	Negro Casas defeated El Hijo del Santo	2000 Leyenda de Plata final
