= Leyenda de Plata (2001) =

Mexican professional wrestling tournament

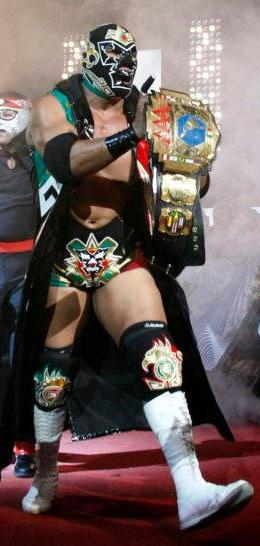
- Dr. Wagner Jr., first person eliminated from the match along with Atlantis
- Promotion: Consejo Mundial de Lucha Libre
- Date: October 5, 2001; October 12, 2001; October 19, 2001
- City: Mexico City, Mexico
- Venue: Arena México

Event chronology
← Previous; CMLL 68th Anniversary Show	Next → Sin Piedad

Leyenda de Plata chronology
← Previous; 2000	Next → 2002

The Leyenda de Plata (2001) was professional wrestling tournament produced by the Mexican wrestling promotion Consejo Mundial de Lucha Libre (CMLLl; Spanish "World Wrestling Council") that ran from October 5, 2001, over the course of three of CMLL's Friday night shows in Arena México with the finals on October 19, 2001. The annual Leyenda de Plata tournament is held in honor of lucha libre legend El Santo and is one of CMLL's most important annual tournaments.

The 2001 Leyenda de Plata was the first tournament to feature a battle royal to determine the two teams for the torneo cibernetico elimination match. The first eight men eliminated from the battle royal would be one team and the remaining eight wrestlers would form the other team in the cibernetico match that followed immediately after the battle royal. Team "A" consisted of Averno, Black Warrior, Black Tiger, Fuerza Guerrera, Juventud Guerrera, Dr. Wagner Jr., Mephisto and Máscara Mágica. Team "B" consisted of Antifaz, Atlantis, Blue Demon Jr., El Hijo del Santo, El Felino, Ricky Marvin, Safari and Virus. The last two survivors were Black Warrior and Black Tiger, both from Team "A". On October 12, 2001, Black Warrior and BlacK Tiger faced off in a singles match that Black Warrior won. The storyline of the match was Black Tiger turning Rudo (heel or "bad guy") while Black Warrior was turning Tecnico (face or "good guy") during the course of the match. The following week Black Warrior's momentum helped him gain the victory over Negro Casas to win the 2001 Leyenda de Plata.

== Production ==
=== Background ===
The Leyenda de Plata (Spanish for "the Silver Legend") is an annual lucha libre tournament scripted and promoted by the Mexican professional wrestling promotion Consejo Mundial de Lucha Libre (CMLL). The first Leyenda de Plata was held in 1998 and was in honor of El Santo, nicknamed Enmáscarado de Plata (the Silver mask) from which the tournament got its name. The trophy given to the winner is a plaque with a metal replica of the mask that El Santo wore in both wrestling and lucha films.

The Leyenda de Plata was held annually until 2003, at which point El Santo's son, El Hijo del Santo left CMLL on bad terms. The tournament returned in 2004 and has been held on an almost annual basis since then. The original format of the tournament was the Torneo cibernetico elimination match to qualify for a semi-final. The winner of the semi-final would face the winner of the previous year's tournament in the final. Since 2005 CMLL has held two cibernetico matches and the winner of each then meet in the semi-final. In 2011, the tournament was modified to eliminate the final stage as the previous winner, Místico, did not work for CMLL at that point in time The 2001 edition of La Leyenda de Plata was the fourth overall tournament held by CMLL.

=== Storylines ===
The events featured a total of number of professional wrestling matches with different wrestlers involved in pre-existing scripted feuds, plots and storylines. Wrestlers were portrayed as either heels (referred to as rudos in Mexico, those that portray the "bad guys") or faces (técnicos in Mexico, the "good guy" characters) as they followed a series of tension-building events, which culminated in a wrestling match or series of matches.

== Tournament overview ==
=== Cibernetico ===
#	Eliminated	Eliminated by
1 and 2	Dr. Wagner Jr. and Atlantis	Double disqualification
3	Safari	Máscara Mágica
4	Fuerza Guerrera	El Hijo del Santo
5	Mephisto	Blue Demon Jr.
6	Antifaz del Nortre	Averno
7	Averno	El Felino
8	Virus	Black Tiger
9	Blue Demon Jr.	Black Warrior
10	Juventud Guerrera	El Hijo del Santo
11	Ricky Marvin	Máscara Mágica
12	Máscara Mágica	El Hijo del Santo
13	El Felino	Black Tiger
14	El Hijo del Santo	Black Warrior
15	Winners	Black Warrior and Black Tiger

== Results ==
=== October 5, 2001 ===
No.	Results	Stipulations
1	Filoso and Sombra de Plata defeated Ramstein and Reyes Veloz	Best two-out-of-three falls tag team match
2	Pantera and Tigre Blanco defeated Arkángel de la Muerte and Halcón Negro	Best two-out-of-three falls tag team match
3	Black Tiger and Black Warrior defeated Dr. Wagner Jr., Juventud Guerrera, Fuerza Guerrera, Averno, Mephisto, Máscara Mágica, Atlantis, Ricky Marvin, El Hijo del Santo, Blue Demon Jr., Antifaz del Norte, Virus, Safari, and El Felino	2001 Leyenda de Plata semi-final, 16-man torneo cibernetico elimination match
4	Apolo Dantés, El Satánico, and Shocker defeated Bestia Salvaje, Emilio Charles Jr., and Scorpió Jr.	Best two-out-of-three falls six-man tag team match

=== October 12, 2001 ===
No.	Results	Stipulations
1	Enemigo Publico, Ramstein, and Sangre Azteca defeated Neutrón, Olimpus, and Volador Jr.	Best two-out-of-three falls six-man tag team match
2	Dr. X, Mr. México, and Virus defeated Pantera, Ricky Marvin, and Tony Rivera	Best two-out-of-three falls six-man tag team match
3	Atlantis, El Felino, and Negro Casas defeated Dr. Wagner Jr., Fuerza Guerrera, and Juventud Guerrera	Best two-out-of-three falls six-man tag team match
4	Apolo Dantés, Máscara Año 2000, and Shocker defeated Bestia Salvaje, Emilio Charles Jr., and Scorpió Jr. by disqualification	Best two-out-of-three falls six-man tag team match
5	Black Warrior defeated Black Tiger	2001 Leyenda de Plata semi-finals

=== October 19, 2001 ===
No.	Results	Stipulations
1	Neutrón, Olimpus, and Volador Jr. defeated Enemigo Publico, Ramstein, and Sangre Azteca	Best two-out-of-three falls six-man tag team match
2	Arkángel de la Muerte, Mr. México, and Virus defeated Alan Stone, Chris Stone, and Tony Rivera	Best two-out-of-three falls six-man tag team match h
3	Emilio Charles Jr., Fuerza Guerrera, and Scorpió Jr. defeated Black Tiger, El Felino, and Olímpico	Best two-out-of-three falls six-man tag team match
4	Atlantis, Lizmark Jr., and Mr. Niebla defeated Dr. Wagner Jr., El Satánico, and Shocker by disqualification	Best two-out-of-three falls six-man tag team match
5	Black Warrior defeated Negro Casas	2001 Leyenda de Plata finals
