= CMLL 68th Anniversary Show =

Professional wrestling eventMexican Professional wrestling show

CMLL 68th Anniversary show
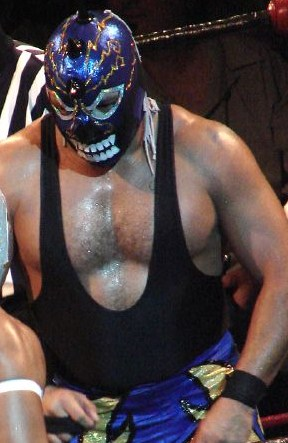
- Mephisto, on the winning side in the main event.
- Promotion: Consejo Mundial de Lucha Libre
- Date: September 28, 2001
- City: Mexico City, Mexico
- Venue: Arena México
- Attendance: 10,500

Event chronology
← Previous; Torneo Gran Alternativa	Next → Leyenda de Plata

CMLL Anniversary Shows chronology
← Previous; 67th Anniversary	Next → 69th Anniversary

The CMLL 68th Anniversary Show (Spanish: 68. Aniversario de CMLL) was a professional wrestling pay-per-view (PPV) event produced and scripted by Consejo Mundial de Lucha Libre (CMLL; "World Wrestling Council") that took place on September 28, 2001 in Arena México, Mexico City, Mexico. The event commemorated the 68th anniversary of CMLL, the oldest professional wrestling promotion in the world. The Anniversary show is CMLL's biggest show of the year, their Super Bowl event. The CMLL Anniversary Show series is the longest-running annual professional wrestling show, starting in 1934.

The show consisted of five matches, with the main event being a Lucha de Apuestas, elimination steel cage match where all seven competitors put their mask on the line, also on the line was the right to use the name Los Infernales, the winning team would claim the name. The competitors were Último Guerrero, Rey Bucanero, Tarzan Boy, Máscara Mágica, Mephisto, Averno and El Satánico. This was the first time a CMLL Anniversary Show featured a steel cage match.

The show featured a total of four Six-man tag team matches, including a match for the Mexican National Trios Championship where Olímpico, Mr. Niebla and Safari defended the championship against the Los Boricuas team of Gran Markus Jr., Violencia and Poder Boricua.

== Production ==
=== Background ===
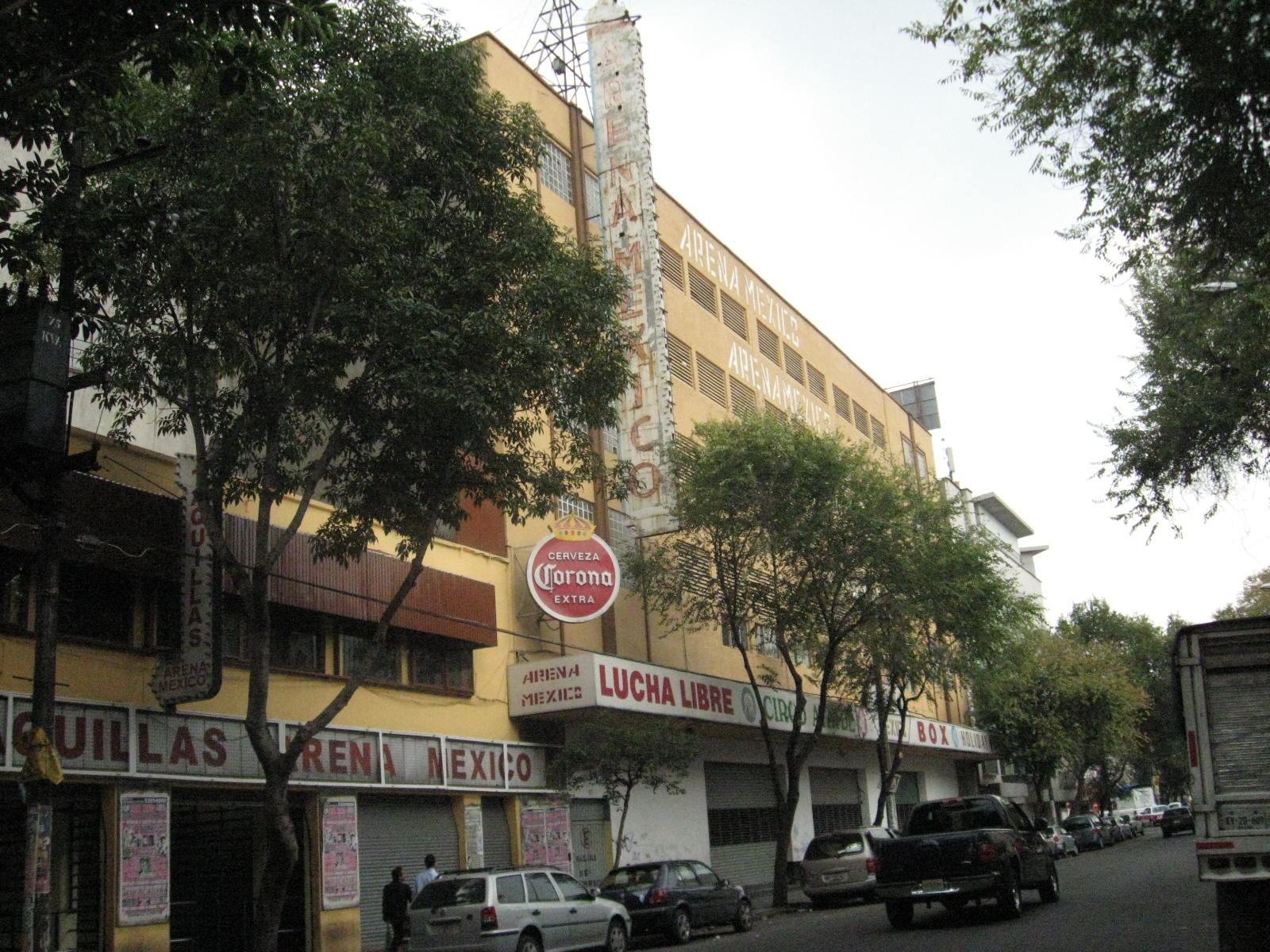
Arena México, CMLL's main venue and host of the 68th Anniversary Show.

The Mexican Lucha libre (professional wrestling) company Consejo Mundial de Lucha Libre (CMLL) started out under the name Empresa Mexicana de Lucha Libre ("Mexican Wrestling Company"; EMLL), founded by Salvador Lutteroth in 1933. Lutteroth, inspired by professional wrestling shows he had attended in Texas, decided to become a wrestling promoter and held his first show on September 21, 1933, marking what would be the beginning of organized professional wrestling in Mexico. Lutteroth would later become known as "the father of Lucha Libre" . A year later EMLL held the EMLL 1st Anniversary Show, starting the annual tradition of the Consejo Mundial de Lucha Libre Anniversary Shows that have been held each year ever since, most commonly in September. Over the years the anniversary show would become the biggest show of the year for CMLL, akin to the Super Bowl for the National Football League (NFL) or WWE's WrestleMania event. The first anniversary show was held in Arena Modelo, which Lutteroth had bought after starting EMLL. In 1942–43 Lutteroth financed the construction of Arena Coliseo, which opened in April 1943. The EMLL 10th Anniversary Show was the first of the anniversary shows to be held in Arena Coliseo. In 1956 Lutteroth had Arena México at the location of the original Arena Modelo, making Arena México the main venue of EMLL from that point on. Starting with the EMLL 23rd Anniversary Show, all anniversary shows except for the EMLL 46th Anniversary Show have been held in the arena that would become known as "The Cathedral of Lucha Libre". On occasion EMLL held more than one show labelled as their "Anniversary" show, such as two 33rd Anniversary Shows in 1966. Over time the anniversary show series became the oldest, longest-running annual professional wrestling show. In comparison, WWE's WrestleMania is only the fourth oldest still promoted show (after CMLL's Arena Coliseo Anniversary Show and Arena México anniversary shows). EMLL was supposed to hold the EMLL 52nd Anniversary Show on September 20, 1985 but Mexico City was hit by a magnitude 8.0 earthquake. EMLL canceled the event both because of the general devastation but also over fears that Arena México might not be structurally sound after the earthquake.

When Jim Crockett Promotions was bought by Ted Turner in 1988 EMLL became the oldest still active promotion in the world. In 1991 EMLL was rebranded as "Consejo Mundial de Lucha Libre" and thus held the CMLL 59th Anniversary Show, the first under the new name, on September 18, 1992. Traditionally CMLL holds their major events on Friday Nights, replacing their regularly scheduled Super Viernes show. The 2001 show commemorated the 68th anniversary of CMLL. Between 1998 and 2002 CMLL broadcast 11 of their major shows on pay-per-view (PPV) television to viewers in Mexico, starting with the 1998 Ruleta de la Muerte tournament. The 68th Anniversary show was the first CMLL Anniversary show to be offered on PPV, something that was not offered again until the CMLL 73rd Anniversary Show in 2006. The 2001 event was the first time the very conservative CMLL would hold a steel cage match on their anniversary show.

=== Storylines ===
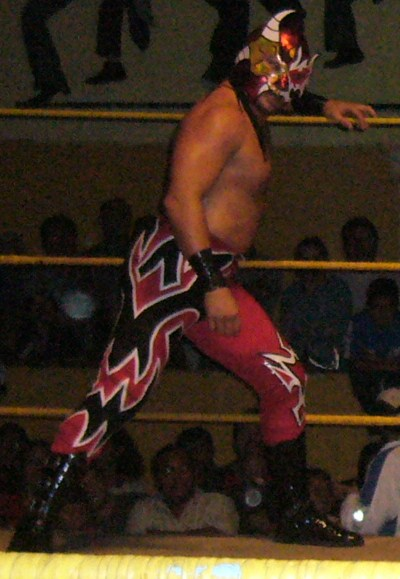
Averno wearing a half Averno/half Rencor Latino mask in 2005

The event featured five professional wrestling matches with different wrestlers involved in pre-existing scripted feuds or storylines. Wrestlers portray either villains (referred to as Rudos in Mexico) or fan favorites (Técnicos in Mexico) as they compete in wrestling matches with pre-determined outcomes.

During the early 1980s the six-man tag teams, or Trios, became extremely popular with the fans in Mexico, to the point where it actually became the most common match form. During the emergence of the Trios matches El Satánico formed a trio with Pirata Morgan and Espectro Jr. known as Los Infernales ("The Infernal Ones"), one of the teams credited with the trios match becoming the most common match form in Lucha libre. Los Infernales existed in various forms from the early 1980s through the mid-1990s. In 1999 El Satánico began teaming with a couple of young wrestlers, Rey Bucanero and Último Guerrero, on a regular basis. The trio, soon dubbed Los Nuevo Infernales, or simply Los Infernales, won the 1999 version of the Copa de Arena Mexico by defeating the trio of Emilio Charles Jr., Mr. Niebla and Tarzan Boy in the finals. Following the tournament El Satánico began working a feud with the young técnico Tarzan Boy, with the explanation being that "El Satánico wanted to teach the young kid a lesson". Meanwhile, Rey Bucanero and Último Guerrero experienced their own success as they won the CMLL World Tag Team Championship by defeating Villano IV and Mr. Niebla in a tournament final to win the vacant championship.

The feud between El Satánico. and Tarzan Boy was used to turn both Bucanero and Último Guerrero against El Satánico. Bucanero, Guerrero and Tarzan Boy claimed that they deserved the name Los Infernales and that "old man" Satánico was holding them back. For the storyline El Satánico then recruited two other wrestlers to even the numbers, which on TV was presented as if he used his "Satanic powers" to turn wrestler Rencor Latino into Averno (Spanish for "Hell") and transformed Astro Rey Jr. into a character known as Mephisto. When Tarzan Boy was injured and unable to wrestle Bucanero and Guerrero recruited Máscara Mágica to even the numbers between the two factions. By the summer of 2001, both factions agreed to face off in one final match to settle the score. The match would include all seven wrestlers and be a steel cage match, the first steel cage match to be featured on an anniversary show. The rules stated that a wrestler could escape the cage after a certain amount of time had passed, with the last two wrestlers in the cage having to wrestle to a pinfall or a submission. The winning team would be given the rights to the name Los Infernales while the wrestler that specifically lost would be forced to either remove their mask or have their hair shaved off after Lucha de Apuestas, or "bet match", rules.

On July 6, 1996 the team of Blue Panther, Fuerza Guerrera and El Signo won the Mexican National Trios Championship, a championship that had previously been promoted by CMLL but by 1996 was promoted by rival promotions Asistencia Asesoría y Administración (AAA) and Promotora Mexicana de Lucha Libre (PROMLL). Later on, AAA and PROMLL had a falling out and the trios championship became inactive as the champions did not team up on a regular basis. After not being defended since September 1996 the trio came together again on March 30, 2002 at the 2001 Juicio Final ("Final Justice") CMLL show. The trio lost the Mexican National Trios Championship to CMLL-regulars Olímpico, Mr. Niebla and Safari, signalling that the championship was back under CMLL's control. During the summer of 2001 the CMLL based Los Boricuas (Spanish slang for people from Puerto Rico) had become one of the promotion's main rudo groups. The group was led by Pierroth Jr. and also included veteran wrestler Gran Markus Jr. as well as Violencia, Veneno, Nitro and Poder Boricua. Due to their prominent position in CMLL the team of Gran Markus Jr., Veneno and Poder Boricua were granted a match for the Mexican National Trios Championship.

== Event ==
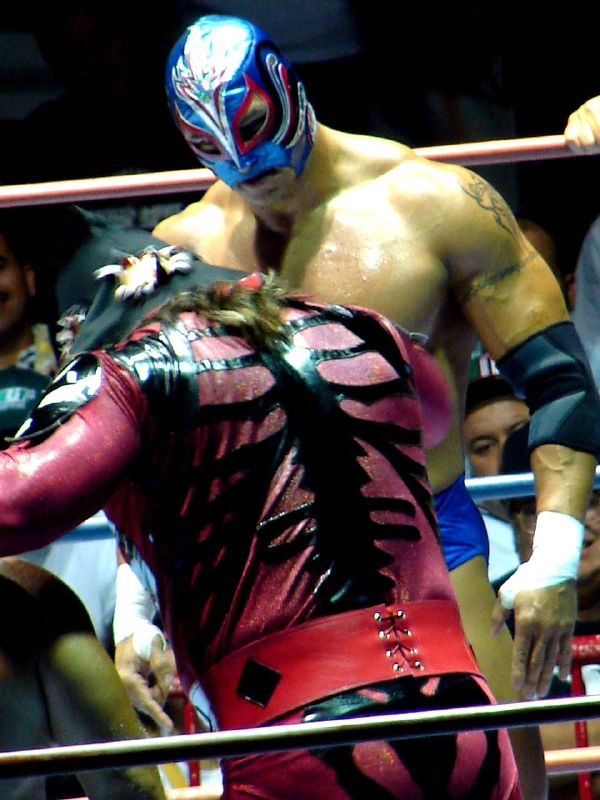
Olímpico (in blue) one third of the Mexican National Trios Championship team.

The first match of the show was a best two-out-of-three falls six-man "Lucha Libre rules" tag team match, the most common match form in lucha libre since the early 1980s. In this case the técnico team of Ricky Marvin, Sicodélico Jr. and Tigre Blanco took on the makeshift rudo team of Doctor X, Virus and Mr. Mexico. In the first fall Sicodélico Jr. forced Doctor X to submit while Tigre Blanco forced Mr. Mexico submit at the same time to take the first fall. In the second fall, Mr. Mexico pinned Sicodélico Jr. to win the fall, evening the score. In the third fall all three rudos pinned their opponents at the same time to win the match two falls to one. For the second match of the night the técnico side (Atlantis, Brazo de Plata and El Felino) won the first fall when they pinned all three of their opponents (Black Warrior, Apolo Dantés and Shocker). The rudo team fought back and won the second fall, and then the third and deciding fall as Shocker pinned El Felino and Apolo Dantés pinned Brazo de Plata.

For the Mexican National Trios Championship challengers Los Boricuas, represented by Gran Markus Jr, Violencia and Poder Boricua in this case, was accompanied by Pierroth Jr. and La Nazi. The outside interference helped Los Boricuas win the first fall over Olímpico, Mr. Niebla and Safari. In the third and final fall, both Mr. Niebla and Safari piled on Gran Markus Jr. to pin him and retain the championship. After the loss Pierroth Jr. berated Gran Markus Jr. over the loss. The fourth match of the night featured brothers Dr. Wagner Jr. and Black Tiger on opposite sides as they each captained a trio. In the third and deciding fall Dr. Wagner Jr. pinned Negro Casas to bring the victory for himself, Universo 2000, Juventud Guerrera and Fuerza Guerrera.

For the main event, the CMLL ring crew quickly erected a 15-foot tall steel cage around the ring as the participants were introduced. The match started out with a 10-minute period where no one would be allowed to leave the cage, forcing the two Infernales squads to fight each other. When the 10 minutes were up Tarzan Boy was quick to climb up the cage and over the top, escaping while everyone else was fighting. Moments later he was joined by teammate Rey Bucanero. Mephisto was the first to escape the cage for his team, leaving four men in the ring. Moments later both Último Guerrero and Averno climbed out of the cage. This left El Satánico to fight Máscara Mágica where the only way to win was to pin their opponent or force them to submit. In the end, the veteran Satánico forced his masked opponent to submit to win the match and the Los Infernales name. Afterwards Máscara Mágica removed his mask per the Lucha de Apuestas stipulations and revealed his birth name, Antonio Gómez Medina, formerly known as Talismán Jr.

== Aftermath ==
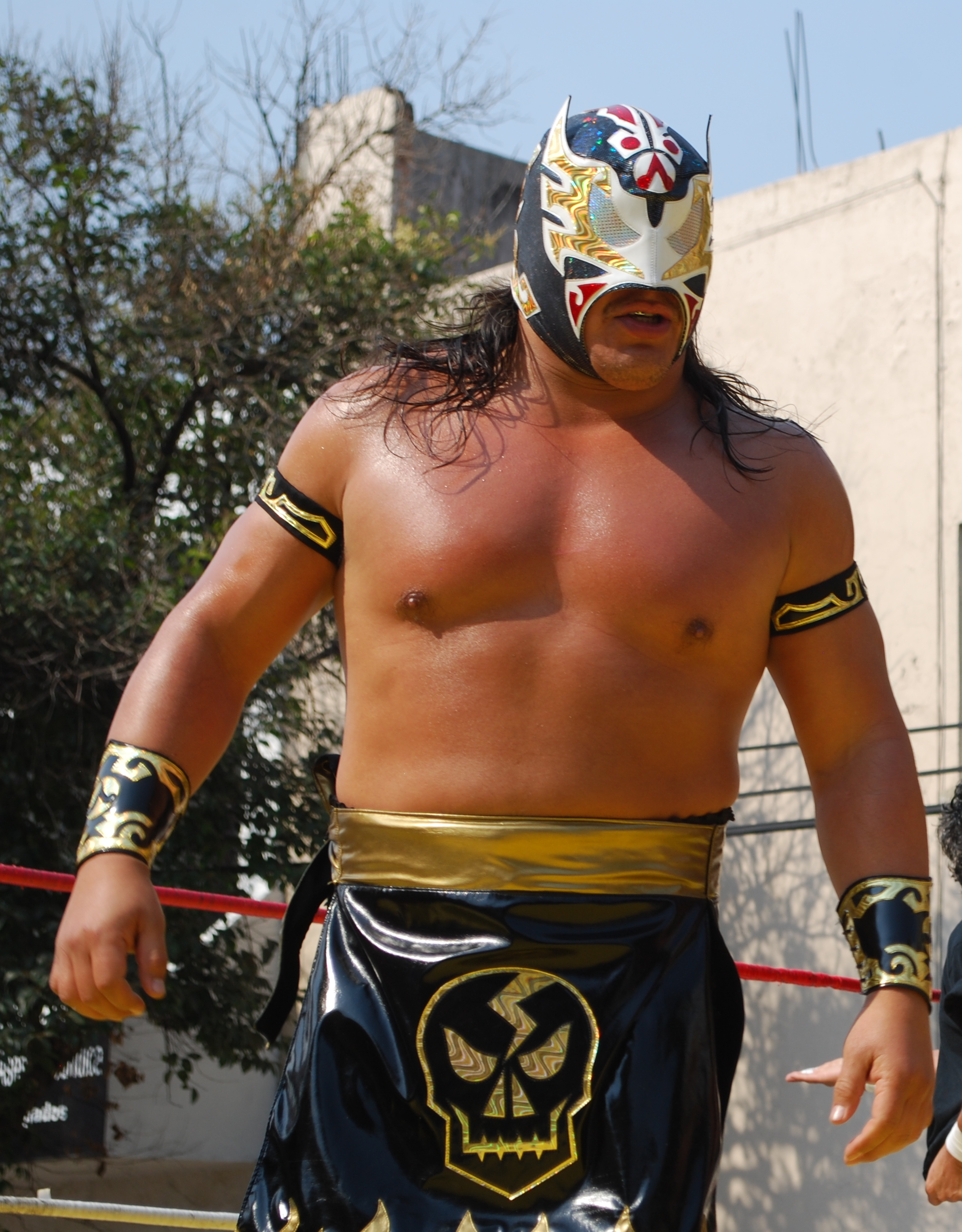
Último Guerrero, who led the renamed Los Guerreros del Infierno faction after the main event loss.

Following their victory in the main event Los Infernales ended up facing off against and defeating the reigning Mexican National Trios Champions, Olímpico, Mr. Niebla and Safari at CMLL's next major event, Sin Piedad ("No Mercy"), although the championship was not on the line at the time. They were later able to use their non-title victory to be granted a championship match, winning the Mexican National Trios Championship on June 23, 2003. Los Nuevo Infernales reign as champions lasted 96 days, until they were defeated by La Familia de Tijuana (Damián 666, Halloween and Nicho el Millonario) on September 27, 2003. Averno and Mephisto turned on El Satánico shortly after the championship loss and formed their own group known as La Trada del Terror (the trio of terror) along with Ephesto, putting an end to Los Infernales just over a year after they won the rights to the name.

While Antonio Gómez was forced to remove his mask after the match he kept the ring name "Máscara Mágica" throughout his career, despite never wearing the match again. Following the 68th anniversary show main event loss Último Guerrero, Rey Bucanero and Tarzan Boy decided to change the name of their group to Los Guerreros del Infierno (The Infernal Soldiers). The three blamed Máscara Mágica for the loss, kicking him out of the group afterwards. Los Guerreros del Infierno would go on to become one of CMLL's premier rudo factions in subsequent years with a revolving membership that at one point or another included Olímpico, Sangre Azteca, Atlantis, Averno, Mephisto, Dragón Rojo, Jr., Rey Escorpión, Euforia, Niebla Roja and Gran Guerrero. The faction even got their own "minor league" team, known as Pandilla Guerrera ("Gang of Warriors"). Over the years the group would also be referred to as Los Guerreros del Atlantida (after Atlantis joined) and later Los Guerreros Laguneros ("The Warriors of the Lagoon") referring to the Lagoon area of Mexico.

The championship loss by Los Boricuas furthered already existing problems between Pierroth Jr. and Gran Markus Jr. leading to Gran Markus Jr. breaking away from the group in the fall of 2001, stating that he was tired of being under Pierroth Jr.'s command. On March 27, 2002, at CMLL's annual Homenaje a Dos Leyendas: El Santo y Salvador Lutteroth ("Homage to two legends") show Gran Markus Jr. defeated Veneno in a Lucha de Apuestas, or bet match, forcing Veneno to unmask as a result of the loss. In subsequent months Poder Boricua left the group as well, changing his name to "Poder Mexica" ("Mexican Power"), siding with Gran Markus Jr. against the rest of Los Boricuas. On July 14, 2002 Poder Mexica and Mr. Mexico lost a Luchas de Apuestas match to Veneno and Violencia and as a result Poder Mexica was forced to unmask. The feud between Los Boricuas and their former members continued as Gran Markus Jr. won a Luchas de Apuestas match in November, 2002 forcing Veneno to have all his hair shaved off. The culmination of the storyline came on March 21, 2003 as Pierroth Jr. and Gran Markus Jr. faced off in main event of that year's Homenaje a Dos Leyendas show. In the end Pierroth defeated Gran Markus and as a result Gran Markus Jr. was shaved bald.

The 68th Anniversary Show marked the last time Máscara Mágica and El Satánico wrestled in the main event of the anniversary shows, while the other competitors worked at least one more main event match at a subsequent anniversary show. Tarzan Boy lost a Lucha de Apuestas match to Shocker and had his hair shaved off at the CMLL 70th Anniversary Show, Rey Bucanero lost a 10-man Infierno en el ring steel cage match in the main event of the CMLL 78th Anniversary Show, and Último Guerrero was unmasked after his loss to Atlantis in the main event of the CMLL 81st Anniversary Show.

== Results ==
No.	Results	Stipulations
1	Doctor X, Virus and Mr. Mexico defeated Ricky Marvin, Sicodélico Jr. and Tigre Blanco – two falls to one	Best two-out-of-three falls six-man "Lucha Libre rules" tag team match
2	Black Warrior, Apolo Dantés and Shocker defeated Atlantis, Brazo de Plata and El Felino – two falls to one	Best two-out-of-three falls six-man "Lucha Libre rules" tag team match
3	Olímpico, Mr. Niebla and Safari (c) defeated Los Boricuas (Gran Markus Jr., Violencia and Poder Boricua) – two falls to one	Best two-out-of-three falls six-man "Lucha Libre rules" tag team match for the Mexican National Trios Championship
4	Dr. Wagner Jr., Universo 2000, Juventud Guerrera and Fuerza Guerrera defeated Lizmark Jr., Negro Casas, Villano IV and Black Tiger – two falls to one	Best two-out-of-three falls eight-man Atómicos tag team match
5	Máscara Mágica lost to El Satánico; Also in the match: Último Guerrero, Rey Bucanero, Tarzan Boy, Mephisto and Averno	Seven-man steel cage match elimination Lucha de Apuestas match.
(c) / – the champion(s) heading into the match
