= Luciferno =

Mexican professional wrestler

Personal information
- Born: Jesús Parra Ramírez; January 11, 1972 (age 54) Gómez Palacio, Durango, Mexico

Professional wrestling career
- Ring name(s): Hombre Sin Nombre; Hooligan; Luciferno; Super Punk; Último Rebelde
- Billed height: 1.75 m (5 ft 9 in)
- Billed weight: 98 kg (216 lb)
- Trained by: Blue Panther; Satánico; Halcón Suriano; Asterión
- Debut: December 25, 1989

Jesús Parra Ramírez (born January 11, 1972) is a Mexican professional wrestler best known under the ring name Hooligan. He is currently working under the ring name Luciferno. Ramírez has worked for Consejo Mundial de Lucha Libre (CMLL) since 2002 and is a founding member of the group Los Guerreros Tuareg as well as being a core member in the group that preceded it, Pandilla Guerrera. Ramírez has previously wrestled under the ring names Super Punk and Último Rebelde. He is the brother of CMLL wrestler Ephesto, although it is not acknowledged on television.

== Professional wrestling career ==
Ramírez was trained for his professional wrestling career by Durango locals Halcón Suriano and Asterión, wanting to follow in his older brother's footsteps and become a professional wrestler. Ramírez was in the same class as the wrestler who would later be known as Último Guerrero and the two became close friends. Ramírez made his professional wrestling debut on December 25, 1989 as the mask character "Super Punk", inspired by the British punk rock scene, complete with a Mohawk sticking out of the top of his mask. After Guerrero made his debut 1990 as El Flanagan the two began teaming up on a regular basis, earning the two the Laguna Tag Team Championship at one point in time. After working around Durango only both Ramírez and his tag team partner were given a big opportunity by Promo Azteca in 1997. They brought the team in under the name Los Hooligans, with Ramírez working as Último Rebelde ("The Last Rebel") and El Flanagan becoming Último Guerrero ("The Last Warrior"). Los Hooligans first major storyline feud saw them face off against the team of Torero and Salsero. The storyline was supposed to see Los Hooligans lose their masks to Torero and Salsero in a Lucha de Apuesta match, but Guerrero left Promo Azteca to join Consejo Mundial de Lucha Libre (CMLL) to keep from being unmasked. In the end Último Rebelde lost to Torero on December 13, 1997, after which he had to unmask and reveal his real name per Lucha Libre traditions. When Promo Azteca closed down less than a year later Ramírez worked mainly local shows until getting an opportunity to wrestle for CMLL in 2002

Ramírez made his debut for CMLL in August, 2002 wrestling as the enmascarado character Hooligan, inspired by the British football hooligans. His mask was originally patterned after the Union Jack, although it was later modified with a Mohawk and decorations. He started out working in the first or second match of the night with mixed success. In 2003 he teamed up with Sangre Azteca and Ramstein to form a rúdo (bad guy) group called La Alianza ("The Alliance"). La Alianza's lone highlight was their participation in a tournament for the vacant Mexican National Trios Championship in 2003, although they lost in the first round.

=== Pandilla Guerrera and Guerros Tuareg ===
In 2004 Los Guerreros del Infierno created a mid-card sub group called Pandilla Guerrera (Spanish for "Gang of Warriors") to counter Los Guapos' Guapos U group. Pandilla Guerrera included all three Alianza members as well as Nitro, Doctor X, Loco Max, Arkangel de la Muerte, El Koreano. Initially the group featured prominently in CMLL storylines but when Los Guapos left CMLL Pandilla Guerrera became used mainly to help young tecnicos improve in the ring and less as a group likely to move up the rankings. On December 12, 2005 Hooligan teamed with Arkangel and Loco Max only to lose to the team of El Texano, Jr., Stuka, Jr. and Virus in the opening match of the 2005 Juicio Final show.

In 2007 several members of Pandilla Guerrera broke away from Los Guerreros del Infierno to establish their own identity as a group called Los Rebeldes del Desertio ("The Desert Rebels") and sometimes Los Rebeldes del Tuareg ("The Tuareg Rebels") but ended up being known generally as Los Guerreros Tuareg ("The Tuareg Warriors"). Despite the new name Guerreros Tuareg remained a mid-card rudo team, used mainly to help elevate their opponents. In June 2008 Hooligan and Arkangel de la Muerte teamed up to compete in a tournament for the CMLL Arena Coliseo Tag Team Championship. In the first round Hooligan and Arkangel defeated Leono and Tony Rivera but lost in the second round to Ángel Azteca, Jr. and Máscara Purpura. On October 18, 2009 Hooligan was one of 12 wrestlers who put their mask on the line in a 12-man Luchas de Apuestas cage match. He was the second person to escape the cage keeping his mask safe, the final saw Pólvora pin Tigre Blanco to unmask him. Hooligan was one of 12 men who put their mask on the line as part of a 12-man steel cage match in the main event of the 2010 Infierno en el Ring. He was the first man to escape the cage, showing his true rudo character by distracting his Guerreros Tuareg team member Doctor X in order to escape the cage. In the end Ángel de Oro defeated Fabián el Gitano in the Lucha de Apueta (bet match) portion of the match to unmask him.

=== Luciferno ===
On February 3, 2015, Ramírez debuted under the new ring name Luciferno and joined Mephisto and his brother Ephesto in a group called Los Hijos del Infierno ("The Sons of the Inferno"). On August 9, 2015 Los Hijos del Infierno defeated Los Reyes de la Atlantida ("The Kings of the Atlantis"; Atlantis, Delta and Guerrero Maya Jr.) to win the Mexican National Trios Championship. When the trio dissolved in late 2021 to make way for a Los Infernales revival, Luciferno joined fellow offshoot group Los Cancerberos del Infierno as their new 3rd member instead.

Luciferno's last match for CMLL was a loss alongside Los Canerberos on July 22, 2025.

== Private life ==
Ramírez' brother is also a Luchador working for CMLL under the name Ephesto, since Ephesto has never been unmasked in a Lucha de Apuesta match his first name is not a matter of public record. Ramírez was a training partner of Último Guerrero (then wrestling as El Flanagan) which developed a close bond between the two, so close that he often calls Guerrero "his brother" to the point that they have many times been mistaken for brothers, even though there's no blood relation between them.

== Championships and accomplishments ==
- Consejo Mundial de Lucha Libre
  - Mexican National Trios Championship (1 time) – with Ephesto and Mephisto
- Mexican Local promotions
  - Laguna Tag Team Championship (1 time) – with El Flanagan

== Luchas de Apuestas record ==
Winner (wager)	Loser (wager)	Location	Event	Date	Notes
Torero (mask)	Último Rebelde (mask)	Nezahualcoyotl, Mexico State]	Live event	December 13, 1997	
