= Apocalipsis (wrestler) =

Mexican professional wrestler

Personal information
- Born: Juan Carlos Contreras Uribe; January 16, 1975 (age 51) Mexico City, Mexico

Professional wrestling career
- Ring name(s): Apocalipsis; El Koreano
- Billed height: 1.70 m (5 ft 7 in)
- Billed weight: 90 kg (198 lb)
- Trained by: Tony Salazar; Jose Luis Feliciano
- Debut: February 11, 2000

Juan Carlos Contreras Uribe (born January 16, 1975), better known by his ring name Apocalipsis, is a Mexican professional wrestler, who works for Consejo Mundial de Lucha Libre (CMLL). He previously worked under the ring name El Koreano.

== Professional wrestling career ==
Juan Contreras made his professional wrestling debut on February 11, 2000, after training under Consejo Mundial de Lucha Libre (CMLL) wrestling trainers Tony Salazar and Jose Luis Feliciano. He adopted the ring name El Koreano for his wrestling character, a martial arts inspired character that supposedly was from South Korea. Early in his career as El Koreano, Contreras worked a storyline feud against Ricky Marvin, a storyline that resulted in the two fighting each other under Lucha de Apuestas (or "bet match") rules, where each participant would be either their wrestling mask or hair on the outcome of the match. Marvin won, which meant that the unmasked Koerano was forced to have all his hair shaved off in front of the audience in attendance. In 2004, CMLL created the Guapos University ("Handsome University"), or Guapos U, a storyline similar to various reality show contests such as WWE Tough Enough, searching for a new member to join Shocker, Máscara Mágica and El Terrible as part of Los Guapos. The contestants included El Koreano in addition to Sangre Azteca, Alan Stone, Chris Stone, El Texano Jr., Misterioso Jr., Brazo de Oro Jr., Brazo de Plata Jr., Fabian El Gitano, Tigre Metálico, Lestat, Leono, Lobo Vikingo, Máximo, Karissma, and Espiritu Maligno. The group would participate in a series of matches as Los Guapos tried to determine a winner worthy of joining their ranks. The matches included a tournament for Guapos U contestants only, where the winning team would get the Mexican National Trios Championship. The tournament was won by Misterioso Jr., Brazo de Oro Jr. and El Texano Jr., although they were unable to win the Championship when they received their championship match. During one of CMLL's shows, El Terrible turned on the group and was joined by Último Guerrero in the attack on the rest of Los Guapos. El Koreano and fellow Guapo U member Sangre Azteca prevented the rest of the group from stopping the attack, leading to the two them being kicked out of the group. Guerrero immediately took both El Koreano and Sangre Azteca under his wing, forming Pandilla Guerrera ("Gang of Warriors"), a mid-card group associated with Último Guerrero's Los Guerreros del Infierno group. Sangre Azteca soon became the leader of the group, that besides El Koreano, also included Ramstein, Hooligan, Nitro, Arkangel de la Muerte, Loco Max and Doctor X. In June 2005, Contreras wrestled his last match under the "El Koreano" name.

=== Apocalipsis (2005–present) ===
A month later, Contreras made his debut as the enmascarado ("masked wrestler") character "Apocalipsis" (Spanish for "Apocalypse"), a character not associated with Pandilla Guerrera at all, with CMLL not publicly acknowledging that it was Contreras under the mask. He made his debut as Apocalipsis as part of the 2005 Gran Alternativa tournament, where a novato (or rookie), teamed up with a veteran for a tag team tournament. As Apocalipsis, he teamed up with Damian 666 for the tournament. The tournament was held on July 1, 2005, and featured a battle royal between the eight rookies to determine the seeding for the tournament. Doctor X won the battle royal to earn the top seed for Universo 2000 and himself. The order of elimination in the battle royal was: #1 El Texano Jr., #2 Nitro, #3 Apocalipsis, #4 Máximo, #5 Sangre Azteca, #6 La Máscara, #7 Misterioso Jr. The team lost to eventual tournament winners La Máscara and Atlantis in the first round of the tournament. A few weeks later, Apocalipsis was one of 8 wrestlers in a torneo cibernetico elimination match that was part of CMLL's G1 Junior Climax tournament. Apocalipsis was eliminated early in as La Máscara won the match. In the years following his character change, Contreras, as Apocalipsis, worked primarily in the first and second match of the night, often playing the villainous foil to young tecnico wrestlers. In 2008, he suffered a severe shoulder injury when Metálico dove out of the ring onto him. The injury kept him out of the ring for a long period of time, but upon his return, he resumed his role as an opening match rudo. In 2011, Apocalipsis was one of the "veteran" rudos who were matched up against a group of young CMLL wrestlers called Generacion 2011. Apocalipsis joined up with Inquisidor, Los Rayos Tapatío and a number of other low or mid-card rudos to fight Generacion 2011 representatives Dragon Lee, Magnus, Hombre Bala Jr. and Super Halcón Jr. Originally the focus of the storyline was on the conflicts between Los Rayos and Dragon Lee, playing off Los Rayos feeling that Dragon Lee was an arrogant rookie who had not "paid his due", but when Dragon Lee was injured, plans had to be changed. After playing a supporting character in the "Veterans vs. Generacion 2011" storyline, Apocalipsis continued to work as a low-card rudo worker whose primary purpose is to help rookie tecnicos gain in-ring experience.

== Championships and accomplishments ==
- Comisión de Box y Lucha Libre Mexico D.F.
  - Mexican National Trios Championship (1 time) – with El Cholo and Disturbio
- New Wrestling Generation
  - NWG Azteca Championship (1 time)

== Luchas de Apuestas record ==
Winner (wager)	Loser (wager)	Location	Event	Date	Notes
Ricky Marvin (hair)	El Koreano (mask)	Nezahualcoyotl, Mexico State	Live event	October 15, 2000	
Valiente Jr. (mask)	Apocalipsis (mask)	Mexico City	Sin Salida	January 1, 2023	(Note: Steel cage match that also included Bengala, Principe Odin Jr., Nitro, Inquisidor, Oro Jr., Difunto, Retro, Zandokan Jr., Neón and Millenium.)
