= List of Mexican National Trios Champions =

List of professional wrestling trios tag team champions

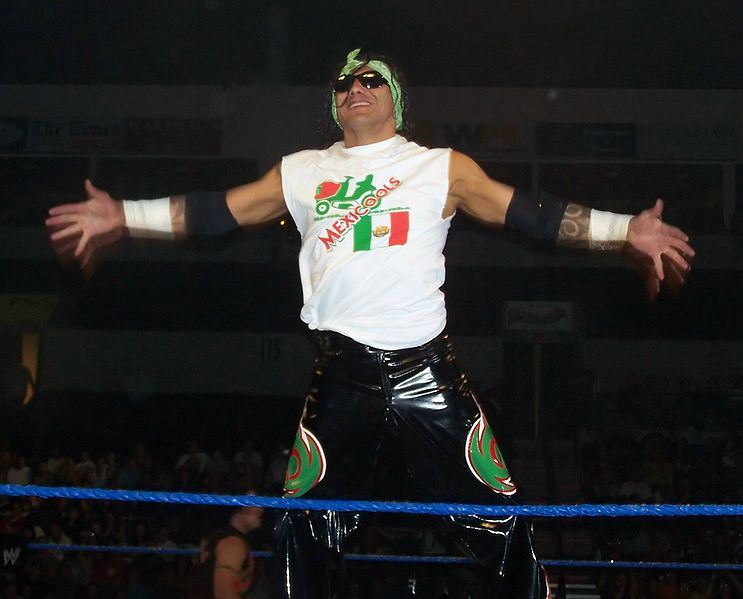
Nicho el Millonario, one third of the 22nd Mexican National Trios Champion along with Halloween and Damián 666

The Mexican National Trios Championship (Campeonato National Trios in Spanish) is a Mexican professional wrestling three-man tag team championship created and sanctioned by "Comisión de Box y Lucha Libre Mexico D.F." (the Mexico City Boxing and Wrestling Commission in Spanish). Although the Commission sanctions the title, it does not promote the events in which the title is defended. As it is a professional wrestling championship, it is not won legitimately; it is instead won via a scripted ending to a match or awarded to a wrestler because of a storyline. All title matches take place under two out of three falls rules.

The Mexican National Trios Championship was created in 1985. Consejo Mundial de Lucha Libre (CMLL; Spanish for World Wrestling Council) was given the promotional control of the title while the Commission only have to approve the champions. (Note: In this statement, "control" refers to the every day use of the title, determining which storylines the title is being used in, who gets to challenge for the title and how to use it in a public relations sense.) The first champion crowned was the team of Los Infernales (Spanish for The Infernals; MS-1, Pirata Morgan and El Satánico). CMLL controlled the championship from 1985 until 1994, when Asistencia Asesoría y Administración (AAA; Spanish for Assistance Consultancy and Administration) took control of the championship. The first champion of the AAA-controlled era was Los Hermanos Dinamita (Spanish for The Dynamite Brothers; Cien Caras, Máscara Año 2000 and Universo 2000). When the AAA began to co-promote events with Promotora Mexicana de Lucha Libre (PROMELL), the title became jointly operated; when the AAA and PROMELL split up in 1996, the championship was vacated. The Commission returned the championship to CMLL, allowing them to hold a tournament to crown the new champions, the team of Blue Panther, Fuerza Guerrera and El Signo. Since 1996, the titles have been exclusively controlled by CMLL.

The current champions are Los Herederos (Felino Jr., Hijo del Stuka Jr., and El Cobarde), who are in their first reign as a team and individually. They won the titles by defeating Los Viajeros Del Espacios (Futuro, Hombre Bala Jr. and Max Star) at CMLL Lunes Clasico on June 16, 2025 in Puebla, Mexico; they are the 45th overall champions. Los Reyes de la Atlantida hold the record for most reigns as a team, with three. The team of Blue Panther, Fuerza Guerrera and El Signo held the title for the longest period, at 1,728 days, while Los Payasos have held it for the shortest period, at 26 days.

== Title history ==
Key
No.	Overall reign number
Reign	Reign number for the specific team—reign numbers for the individuals are in parentheses, if different
Days	Number of days held
N/A	Unknown information
+	Current reign is changing daily

No.	Champion	Championship change			Reign statistics		Notes	Ref.
No.	Champion	Date	Event	Location	Reign	Days	Notes	Ref.
Consejo Mundial de Lucha Libre (CMLL)
1	Los Infernales (MS-1, Pirata Morgan and El Satánico)	March 10, 1985	Live event	Mexico City	1	273	Defeated Los Brazos in a tournament final to become the first Mexican National Trios Champions.	
2	Los Brazos (El Brazo, Brazo de Oro and Brazo de Plata)	December 8, 1985	Live event	Mexico City	1	51		
3	Dos Caras, Villano III and Villano IV	January 28, 1986	Live event	Pachuca, Hidalgo	1	26		
4	Los Brazos (El Brazo, Brazo de Oro and Brazo de Plata)	February 23, 1986	Live event	Mexico City	2	278		
5	Kiss, Ringo Mendoza, and Rayo de Jalisco Jr.	November 28, 1986	Live event	Mexico City	1	275		
6	Hombre Bala, Jerry Estrada and Pirata Morgan	August 30, 1987	Live event	Mexico City	1	154		
7	Los Destructores (Tony Arce, Emilio Charles Jr. and Vulcano)	January 31, 1988	Live event	Mexico City	1	659		
8	Black Terry, Jose Luis Feliciano and Shu El Guerrero	November 20, 1989	Live event	Mexico City	1	62		
9	Los Arqueros del Espacio (El Arquero, Danny Boy and Lasser)	January 21, 1990	Live event	Naucalpan, Mexico	1	208		
10	Los Thundercats (Leono, Panthro and Tigro)	August 17, 1990	Live event	Mexico City	1	255		
11	Los Moviestars (Atlantis, Máscara Sagrada and Octagón)	April 29, 1991	Live event	Mexico City	1	112		
12	Los Hermanos Dinamita (Cien Caras, Máscara Año 2000 and Universo 2000)	August 11, 1991	Live event	Cuernavaca, Morelos	1	N/A		
13	Los Infernales (MS-1, Pirata Morgan and El Satánico)	July 1993	Live event	N/A	2	N/A	During this reign the title became AAA-controlled as the champions left CMLL for AAA.	
13	Los Hermanos Dinamita (Cien Caras, Mascara Año 2000 and Universo 2000)	1994	Live event	N/A	2	N/A		
14	Los Payasos (Coco Amarillo, Coco Azul and Coco Rojo)	April 26, 1994	Live event	Aguascalientes, Aguascalientes	1	26		
15	Ángel Azteca, El Hijo del Santo and Super Muñeco	May 22, 1994	Live event	Juárez, Chihuahua	1	124		
15	Los Payasos (Coco Amarillo, Coco Azul and Coco Rojo)	September 23, 1994	Live event	Tijuana, Baja California	2	135		
16	Los Destructores (Tony Arce (2), Rocco Valente and Vulcano (2))	February 5, 1995	Live event	Tonalá, Jalisco	1	68		
17	Rey Misterio Jr., Octagón and Super Muñeco	April 14, 1995	Live event	Mexico City	1	83		
18	Blue Panther, Fuerza Guerrera and Psicosis	July 6, 1995	Live event	Monterrey, Nuevo León	1	N/A		
—	Vacated	1996	—	—	—	—	Championship vacated when AAA and Promotora Mexicana de Lucha Libre (PROMELL) split. Control of the title was returned to CMLL after this point.	
19	Blue Panther, Fuerza Guerrera and El Signo	July 6, 1996	Live event	Cuautitlán, Mexico	1	1,728	Defeated El Brazo, Brazo de Plata and Super Elektra in a tournament final to win the championship.	
20	Mr. Niebla, Olímpico and Safari	March 30, 2001	Live event	Mexico City	1	450		
21	Los Nuevo Infernales (Averno, Mephisto and El Satánico (3))	June 23, 2002	Live event	Guadalajara, Jalisco	1	96		
22	La Familia de Tijuana (Damián 666, Halloween and Nicho el Millonario)	September 27, 2002	Live event	Mexico City	1	266		
—	Vacated	June 30, 2003	—	—	—	—	The championship was vacated when Nicho el Millonario did not show up for a scheduled title defense against Los Nuevo Infernales. The titles were offered to Los Infernales by default, however; Satánico, on behalf of his team, refused.	
23	El Felino, Safari (2) and Volador Jr.	December 5, 2003	Live event	Mexico City	1	476	Defeated Alan Stone, Super Crazy and Zumbido in a tournament final.	
24	Pandilla Guerrera (Doctor X, Nitro and Sangre Azteca)	March 25, 2005	Live event	Mexico City	1	196		
25	Máximo, El Sagrado and El Texano Jr.	October 7, 2005	Live event	Mexico City	1	569		
26	Los Perros del Mal (Mr. Águila, Damián 666 (2) and Halloween (2))	April 29, 2007	Live event	Mexico City	1	106		
27	El Sagrado (2), La Sombra and Volador Jr.	August 13, 2007	Live event	Mexico City	1	540		
28	Poder Mexica (Sangre Azteca (2), Black Warrior and Dragón Rojo Jr.)	February 3, 2009	Live event	Mexico City	1	318		
—	Vacated	December 18, 2009	—	—	—	—	Championship vacated when Black Warrior left CMLL.	
29	Stuka Jr., Metro and Máscara Dorada / Delta	January 6, 2010	Live event	Mexico City	1	368	Máscara Dorada relinquished his hold of the championship on November 18, 2010. Delta was named his replacement on December 20, 2010.	
30	Ángel de Oro, Diamante and Rush	January 9, 2011	Live event	Mexico City	1	254		
31	Los Invasores (Olímpico (2), Psicosis II and Volador Jr. (3))	September 20, 2011	Live event	Mexico City	1	87		
32	Los Reyes de la Atlantida (Atlantis (2), Delta (2) and Guerrero Maya Jr.)	December 16, 2011	Sin Piedad (2011)	Mexico City	1	189		
33	Los Depredadores del Aire (Black Warrior (2), Mr. Águila (2) and Volador Jr. (4))	June 22, 2012	Live event	Mexico City	1	130		
34	Los Reyes de la Atlantida (Atlantis (3), Delta (3) and Guerrero Maya Jr. (2))	October 30, 2012	Live event	Mexico City	2	47		
35	Los Invasores (Kraneo, Mr. Águila (3) and Psicosis II (2))	December 16, 2012	Live event	Mexico City	1	196		
36	La Máscara, Rush (2) and Titán	June 30, 2013	Live event	Mexico City	1	233		
37	La Peste Negra (El Felino (2), Mr. Niebla (2) and Negro Casas)	February 18, 2014	Live event	Mexico City	1	432		
38	Los Reyes de la Atlantida (Atlantis (4), Delta (4) and Guerrero Maya Jr. (3))	April 26, 2015	Arena México 59th Anniversary Show	Mexico City	3	104		
39	Los Hijos del Infierno (Ephesto (3), Luciferno and Mephisto (2))	August 9, 2015	Live event	Mexico City	1	716	Ephesto previously held the title under the name "Safari"	
40	Nueva Generación Dinamita (El Cuatrero, Forastero and Sansón)	July 25, 2017	live event	Guadalajara, Jalisco	1	1,346		
—	Vacated	April 1, 2021	—	—	—	—	Championship vacated when Nueva Generación Dinamita left CMLL.	
41	Los Cancerberos del Infierno (Cancerbero, Raziel and Virus)	April 24, 2021	Live event	Mexico City	1	382		
—	Vacated	May 11, 2022	—	—	—	—	Championship vacated following the death of Raziel	
42	Atrapasueños (Dulce Gardenia, Espiritu Negro and Rey Cometa)	May 27, 2022	Super Viernes	Mexico City	1	1,584		
43	Los Indestructibles (Apocalipsis, Cholo and Disturbio)	September 29, 2023	Super Viernes	Mexico City	1	284		
44	Los Viajeros Del Espacios (Futuro, Hombre Bala Jr. and Max Star)	July 9, 2024	CMLL Martes De Arena Mexico	Mexico City, Mexico	1	342		
45	Los Herederos (Felino Jr., Hijo de Stuka Jr., and El Cobarde)	June 16, 2025	CMLL Lunes Clásico	Mexico City, Mexico	1	468+		

== Combined reigns ==
As of September 27, 2026.

=== By team ===
Championships without a specific start or end date are not included as it is not possible to calculate the specific number of dates for a reign.

Key

Symbol	Meaning
†	Indicates the current champion
¤	Indicates that one or more of the title reigns does not have a definite start or end date and thus is not counted into the total length
+	Indicates that the number of days held by this individual changes every day.

Rank	Team name if applicable Wrestlers	No. of reigns	Combined days
1	Blue Panther, Fuerza Guerrera and El Signo	1	1,728
2	Nuevo Generacion Dinamita (El Cuatrero, Forastero and Sansón)	1	1,346
3	Los Hijos del Infierno (Ephesto, Luciferno and Mephisto)	1	716
4	Tony Arce, Emilio Charles Jr. and Vulcano	1	659
5	Máximo, Sagrado and El Texano Jr.	1	569
6	Sagrado, La Sombra and Volador Jr.	1	540
7	Atrapasueños (Dulce Gardenia, Espiritu Negro and Rey Cometa)	1	1,584
8	El Felino, Safari and Volador Jr.	1	476
9	Mr. Niebla, Olímpico and Safari	1	450
10	La Peste Negra (El Felino, Mr. Niebla and Negro Casas)	1	432
11	Los Cancerberos del Infierno (Cancerbero, Raziel and Virus)	1	382
12	Stuka Jr., Metro and Máscara Dorada / Delta	1	368 (Note: Máscara Dorada left the team on November 18, 2010, ending his reign at 316 days. Delta's reign started on December 20, 2010.)
13	Los Reyes de la Atlantida (Atlantis, Delta and Guerrero Maya Jr.)	3	342
14	Los Viajeros Del Espacios (Futuro, Hombre Bala Jr. and Max Star)	1	342
15	Los Brazos (El Brazo, Brazo de Oro and Brazo de Plata)	2	329
16	Poder Mexica (Sangre Azteca, Black Warrior and Dragón Rojo Jr.)	1	318
17	Kiss, Ringo Mendoza, and Rayo de Jalisco Jr.	1	275
18	Los Infernales (El Satánico, Pirata Morgan and MS-1)	2	273¤
19	La Familia de Tijuana (Damián 666, Halloween and Nicho el Millonario)	1	266
20	Los Thundercats (Leono, Panthro and Tigro)	1	255
21	Ángel de Oro, Diamante and Rush	1	254
22	Los Indestructibles (Apocalipsis, Cholo and Disturbio)	1	248
23	La Máscara, Rush and Titán	1	233
24	Los Arqueros del Espacio (El Arquero, Danny Boy and Lasser)	1	208
25	Pandilla Guerrera (Dr. X, Nitro and Sangre Azteca)	1	196
26	Los Payasos (Coco Amarillo, Coco Azul and Coco Rojo)	2	161
27	Hombre Bala, Jerry Estrada and Pirata Morgan	1	154
28	Los Depredadores del Aire (Black Warrior, Mr. Águila and Volador Jr.)	1	130
29	Los Invasores (Kraneo, Mr. Águila and Psicosis II)	1	128
30	Ángel Azteca, El Hijo del Santo and Super Muñeco	1	124
31	Atlantis, Máscara Sagrada and Octagón	1	112
32	Los Perros del Mal (Mr. Águila, Damián 666 and Halloween)	1	106
33	Los Nuevo Infernales (Averno, Mephistco and El Satánico)	1	96
34	Los Herederos (Felino Jr., Hijo del Stuka Jr., and El Cobarde) †	1	468+
35	Los Invasores (Olímpico, Psicosis II and Volador Jr.)	1	87
36	Rey Misterio Jr., Octagón and Super Muñeco	1	83
37	Los Destructores (Tony Arce, Rocco Valente and Vulcano)	1	68
38	Black Terry, Jose Luis Feliciano and Shu El Guerrero	1	62
39	Dos Caras, Villano III and Villano IV	1	26

=== By wrestler ===
Rank	Wrestler	No. of reigns	Combined days
1	Blue Panther	2	1,728¤
1	El Signo	1	1,728¤
1	Fuerza Guerrera	2	1,728¤
4	Ephesto / Safari	3	1,642
5	El Cuatrero	1	1,346
5	Forastero	1	1,346
5	Sansón	1	1,346
8	Volador Jr.	4	1,233
9	El Sagrado	2	1,109
10	El Felino	2	908
11	Mr. Niebla	2	882
12	Mephisto	2	813
13	Tony Arce	2	727
13	Vulcano	2	727
15	Luciferno	1	717
16	Emilio Charles Jr.	1	659
17	El Texano Jr.	1	569
17	Máximo	1	569
18	Dulce Gardenia	1	1,584
18	Espiritu Negro	1	1,584
18	Rey Cometa	1	1,584
21	La Sombra	1	540
22	Olímpico	2	537
23	Sangre Azteca	2	514
24	Rush	2	487
25	Atlantis	4	454
26	Black Warrior	2	448
27	Mr. Águila	3	432
28	Negro Casas	1	432
29	Pirata Morgan	3	427 ¤
30	El Satánico	3	396 ¤
31	Damián 666	2	372
31	Halloween	2	372
33	Cancerbero	1	382
33	Raziel	1	382
33	Virus	1	382
36	Metro	1	368
36	Stuka Jr.	1	368
38	Delta	4	362
39	Guerrero Maya Jr.	3	342
40	Futuro	1	342
40	Hombre Bala Jr.	1	342
40	Max Star	1	342
43	Brazo de Oro	2	329
43	Brazo de Plata	2	329
43	El Brazo	2	329
46	Dragón Rojo Jr.	1	318
47	Máscara Dorada	1	316
48	Psicosis	2	283
49	Rayo de Jalisco Jr.	1	275
50	Kiss	1	275
50	Ringo Mendoza	1	275
52	MS-1	2	273 ¤
53	Nicho el Millonario	1	266
54	Leono	1	255
54	Pantro	1	255
54	Tigro	1	255
57	Ángel de Oro	1	254
57	Diamante	1	254
59	Apocalipsis	1	248
59	Cholo	1	248
59	Disturbio	1	248
62	La Máscara	1	233
62	Titán	1	233
64	Danny Boy	1	208
64	El Aquero	1	208
64	Lasser	1	208
67	Super Muñeco	2	207
68	Dr. X	1	196
68	Kraneo	1	196
68	Nitro	1	196
71	Octagón	2	195
72	Coco Amarillo	2	161
72	Coco Azul	2	161
72	Coco Rojo	2	161
75	Hombre Bala	1	154
75	Jerry Estrada	1	154
77	Ángel Azteca	1	124
77	El Hijo del Santo	1	124
79	Máscara Sagrada	1	112
80	Averno	1	96
81	Felino Jr. †	1	468+
81	Hijo del Stuka Jr. †	1	468+
81	El Cobarde †	1	468+
84	Rey Misterio Jr.	1	83
85	Rocco Valente	1	68
86	Black Terry	1	62
86	Jose Luis Feliciano	1	62
86	Shu El Guerrero	1	62
90	Dos Caras	1	26
90	Villano III	1	26
90	Villano IV	1	26
