= CMLL 67th Anniversary Show =

Mexican Professional wrestling show

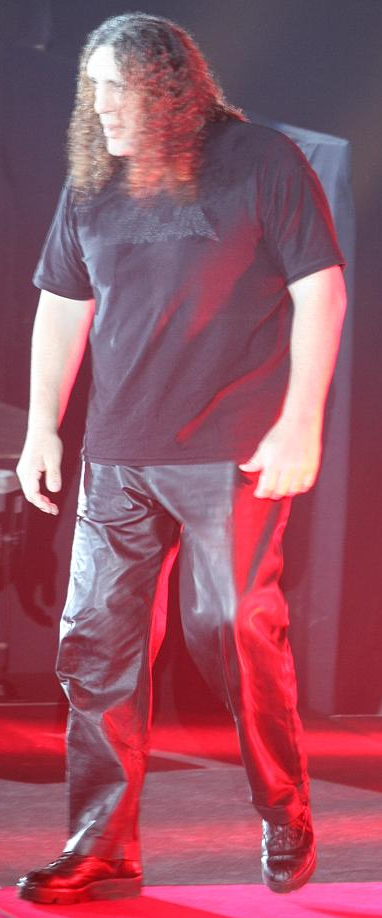
- Giganté Silva, special attraction in the semi-main event
- Promotion: Consejo Mundial de Lucha Libre
- Date: September 29, 2000
- City: Mexico City, Mexico
- Venue: Arena México
- Attendance: 13,400

Event chronology
| ← Previous; Leyenda de Plata | Next → Leyenda de Azul |

CMLL Anniversary Shows chronology
| ← Previous; 66th Anniversary | Next → 68th Anniversary |

The CMLL 67th Anniversary Show (Spanish: 67. Aniversario de CMLL) (Spanish: 86. Aniversario de CMLL) was a major professional wrestling event, scripted and produced by the Mexican lucha libre wrestling company Consejo Mundial de Lucha Libre (CMLL; Spanish for "World Wrestling Council") that took place on September 29, 2000 in CMLL's home arena Arena México in Mexico City, Mexico. The show was the biggest show of the year for CMLL, considered their version of the Super Bowl or WrestleMania. This was the 72nd EMLL/CMLL Anniversary show (There were two in 1963, 1966, 1972, 1975, 1977, but not held in 1985). The event commemorated the 67th anniversary of CMLL, the oldest professional wrestling promotion in the world. The CMLL Anniversary Show series is the longest-running annual professional wrestling show, starting in 1934.

In a break with tradition, the main event of the show was not a lucha de apuestas, or "bet match", but instead hosted the semi-finals of that year's Leyenda de Plata tournament between Negro Casas and Dr. Wagner Jr. The five-match show also featured two six-man tag team matches, a four vs. three-man handicap match, and a tag team match.

== Production ==
=== Background ===
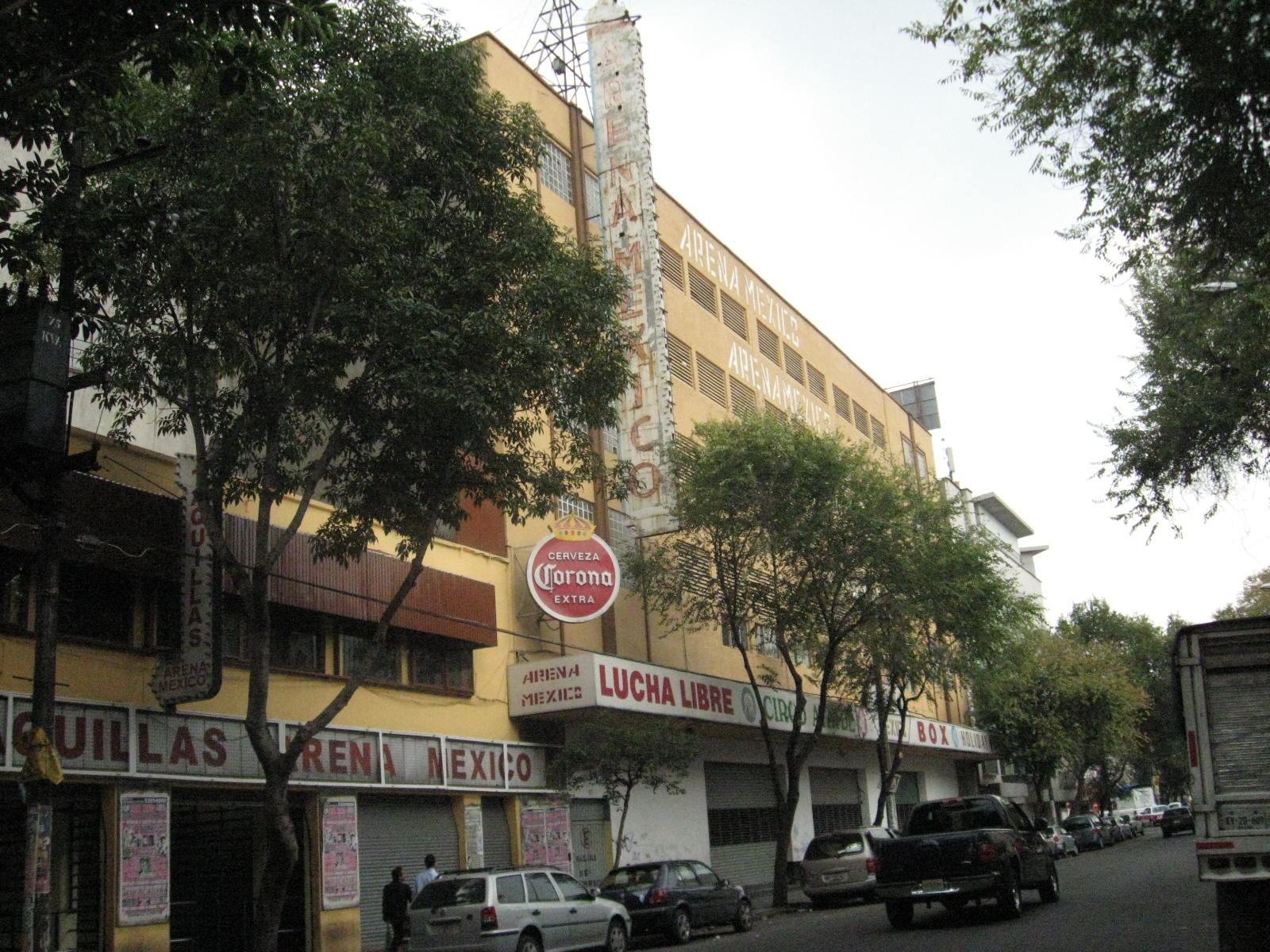
Arena México, CMLL's main venue and location of the 67th Anniversary Show

The Mexican Lucha libre (professional wrestling) company Consejo Mundial de Lucha Libre (CMLL) started out under the name Empresa Mexicana de Lucha Libre ("Mexican Wrestling Company"; EMLL), founded by Salvador Lutteroth in 1933. Lutteroth, inspired by professional wrestling shows he had attended in Texas, decided to become a wrestling promoter and held his first show on September 21, 1933, marking what would be the beginning of organized professional wrestling in Mexico. Lutteroth would later become known as "the father of Lucha Libre" . A year later EMLL held the EMLL 1st Anniversary Show, starting the annual tradition of the Consejo Mundial de Lucha Libre Anniversary Shows that have been held each year ever since, most commonly in September.

Over the years the anniversary show would become the biggest show of the year for CMLL, akin to the Super Bowl for the National Football League (NFL) or WWE's WrestleMania event. The first anniversary show was held in Arena Modelo, which Lutteroth had bought after starting EMLL. In 1942–43 Lutteroth financed the construction of Arena Coliseo, which opened in April 1943. The EMLL 10th Anniversary Show was the first of the anniversary shows to be held in Arena Coliseo. In 1956 Lutteroth had Arena México built in the location of the original Arena Modelo, making Arena México the main venue of EMLL from that point on. Starting with the EMLL 23rd Anniversary Show, all anniversary shows except for the EMLL 46th Anniversary Show have been held in the arena that would become known as "The Cathedral of Lucha Libre". On occasion EMLL held more than one show labeled as their "Anniversary" show, such as two 33rd Anniversary Shows in 1966. Over time the anniversary show series became the oldest, longest-running annual professional wrestling show. In comparison, WWE's WrestleMania is only the fourth oldest still promoted show (CMLL's Arena Coliseo Anniversary Show and Arena México anniversary shows being second and third). EMLL was supposed to hold the EMLL 52nd Anniversary Show on September 20, 1985, but Mexico City was hit by a magnitude 8.0 earthquake. EMLL canceled the event both because of the general devastation but also over fears that Arena México might not be structurally sound after the earthquake.

When Jim Crockett Promotions was bought by Ted Turner in 1988 EMLL became the oldest still active promotion in the world. In 1991 EMLL was rebranded as "Consejo Mundial de Lucha Libre" and thus held the CMLL 59th Anniversary Show, the first under the new name, on September 18, 1992. Traditionally CMLL holds their major events on Friday Nights, replacing their regularly scheduled Super Viernes show. The 2000 show commemorated the 67th anniversary and was the 72nd show in the event chronology as CMLL had previously held two or three anniversary shows some years.

=== Storylines ===
The event featured five professional wrestling matches with different wrestlers involved in pre-existing scripted feuds, plots and storylines. Wrestlers were portrayed as either heels (referred to as rudos in Mexico, those that portray the "bad guys") or faces (técnicos in Mexico, the "good guy" characters) as they followed a series of tension-building events, which culminated in a wrestling match or series of matches.

The focal point of the 67th anniversary was the third ever Leyenda de Plata ("Silver Legend") tournament held in honor of lucha libre legend El Santo and is one of CMLL's most important annual tournaments. The 2000 Leyenda de Plata tournament started one week prior to the anniversary show with a 16-man torneo cibernetico elimination match to determine who would meet in the semi-finals at the 67th Anniversary Show. The semi-finalists were Dr. Wagner Jr. and Negro Casas, outlasting Antifaz del Norte, Atlantis, Astro Rey Jr., Black Warrior, Blue Panther, El Felino, Fuerza Guerrera, Olímpico, Rey Bucanero, Safari, Satánico, Scorpio Jr., Tarzan Boy and Zumbido.

== Aftermath ==
The finals of the Leyenda de Plata took place a week after the anniversary show and saw Casas defeat the previous year's winner El Hijo del Santo to win the tournament.

== Results ==
| No. | Results | Stipulations |
|---|---|---|
| 1 | Alan Stone and Moto Cross defeated Mano Negra Jr. and Sombra de Plata | Best two-out-of-three falls Tag team match |
| 2 | El Felino, Antifaz del Norte and Olímpico defeated Sanshiro Takagi, Secret Sasuke and Nosawa | Best two-out-of-three falls six-man "Lucha Libre rules" tag team match |
| 3 | Los Infernales (El Satánico, Rey Bucanero and Último Guerrero) defeated Atlantis, Villano III and Brazo de Plata | Best two-out-of-three falls six-man "Lucha Libre rules" tag team match |
| 4 | Giganté Silva, Rayo de Jalisco Jr. and Perro Aguayo defeated Los Guapos (Scorpio Jr., Shocker, Bestia Salvaje and Zumbido) | Best two-out-of-three falls four on three "Lucha Libre rules" tag team match |
| 5 | Negro Casas defeated Dr. Wagner Jr. | Best two-out-of-three falls match: 2000 Leyenda de Plata tournament semi-final |

Note: CMLL themselves list September 15th as the Anniversary show, which was headlined by a standard "Lucha Libre rules" six-man tag in which Los Hermanos Dinamita faced the team of El Boricua, Gran Markus Jr. and Pierroth Jr.. This is possibly due to CMLL's policy of editing prominent Lucha Libre AAA Worldwide stars out of their own historic retrospectives, with Wagner Jr. himself having also been excised from recaps of Leyenda de Azul.
