= Ramstein (wrestler) =

Mexican professional wrestler

Personal information
- Born: Francisco Javier Costilla Macedo; December 3, 1974 (age 51) Mexico City, Mexico

Professional wrestling career
- Ring name(s): Fugaz; Ramstein
- Billed height: 1.75 m (5 ft 9 in)
- Billed weight: 83 kg (183 lb)
- Trained by: Potro Salvaje; Tony Salazar; Negro Casas; Memo Díaz
- Debut: May 17, 1993

Francisco Javier Costilla Macedo (born December 3, 1974), better known by his ring name Ramstein, is a Mexican professional wrestler. He is best known for his work with Mexican promotion Consejo Mundial de Lucha Libre (CMLL), where he was a former member of La Alianza and Pandilla Guerrera.

== Professional wrestling career ==
Francisco Costilla began his professional wrestling career in 1993, working as the masked character Fugaz (Spanish for "Fast"), a reference to his high flying, fast-paced wrestling style. At some point early in his career, Costilla was forced to remove the Fugaz mask after losing a Luchas de Apuesta ("Bet Match") against Enemigo Publico. Later, he lost another Luchas de Apuestas match, this time to Rayo Tapatío I, and as a result had to have his hair shaved.

In late 1998 or early 1999, he began working for Consejo Mundial de Lucha Libre (CMLL), one of Mexico's biggest and the world's oldest wrestling promotion. On July 16, 1999, Fugaz teamed up with Sangre Azteca to defeat the team of Sombra de Plata and Ricky Marvin in a match that stole the show, earning the four youngsters a standing ovation from the crowd. The success of this match earned all four a match at CMLL's biggest show of the year, the CMLL 66th Anniversary Show, which took place on September 24, 1999. This time, Marvin and Sombra de Plata won the match.

Fugaz was teamed up with the veteran Scorpio Jr. to participate in the 1999 Gran Alternativa tournament, where a rookie and a veteran team up. The tournament took place on December 17, and had the team advance to the finals by defeating the teams of Sombra de Plata and Lizmark and Negro Casas and La Flecha. In the finals, they lost to El Felino and Tigre Blanco.

Costilla made his last CMLL appearance as "Fugaz" on July 9, 2001, teaming with former rival Enemigo Publico to defeat the team of Neutron and Olimpus.

=== Ramstein (2001–2015) ===
Exactly two weeks after his final appearance as Fugaz, Costilla was reintroduced as the enmascarado character Ramstein (named after the band Rammstein), teaming up with Enemigo Public, losing to longtime rivals of Fugaz, Los Rayos Tapatío. On July 30, 2001, Costilla made one last appearance as Fugaz, when he lost another Luchas de Apuesta, this time to Damián 666, and was once again shaved bald following the match. In 2001, he teamed up with Sangre Azteca and Hooligan to form a rúdo (wrestlers who portray the "bad guys") group called La Alianza ("The Alliance"). La Alianza's lone highlight was their participation in a tournament for the vacant Mexican National Trios Championship in 2003, although they lost in the first round. In 2002, Ramstein and Sangre Azteca won the Distrito Federal Tag Team Championship and would hold the belts until 2004, when they lost them to Los Rayos Tapatío. La Alianza only worked one major CMLL show while they existed, teaming up to defeat Astro Boy, Neutron, and Zetta on the undercard of the 2004 Homenaje a Dos Leyendas ("Homage to two legends") show on March 19, 2004. CMLL created the Guapos University ("Handsome University"), or Guapos U, a storyline mimicking realities shows such as WWE Tough Enough, searching for a new member to join Shocker, Máscara Mágica, and El Terrible as part of Los Guapos. The contestants included, among others, Sangre Azteca who left La Alianza to compete in the "reality show". During one of CMLL's shows, El Terrible turned on the group and was joined by Último Guerrero in the attack on Los Guapos. Sangre Azteca and El Koreano prevented the rest of the Guapos U class in making the save, leading to the two them being kicked out of the group. Guerrero immediately took both Sangre Azteca and Koreano under his wing, forming Pandilla Guerrera ("Gang of Warriors"), a mid-card group associated with Último Guerrero's Los Guerreros del Infierno group that also included the rest of La Alianza, Ramstein and Hooligan. Sangre Azteca would soon lead the group that besides Ramstein and Hooligan also included El Koreano, Nitro, Arkangel de la Muerte, Loco Max and Doctor X. In early 2005, Sangre Azteca, Doctor X and Nitro beat Safari, El Felino, and Volador Jr. Pandilla Guerra held the championship for seven months and made three successful title defenses, before they lost the championship to Máximo, El Texano Jr., and El Sagrado. El Koreano did not stay with the group long, changing his ring name and adopting a mask as he began working as "Apocalipsis", with no reference to his previous character. Pandilla Guerrera remained solidly entrenched in the CMLL mid-card, working primarily with younger tecnicos (wrestlers who portray the "good guys"), helping them gain experience in the ring. Over time, Ramstein appeared less frequently with Pandilla Guerrera, and when Pandilla Guerrero was renamed Los Guerreros Tuareg, he was not included in the new group. In the years following his split from Pandilla Guerrera, Ramstein worked primarily in the first or second match of the show. On January 6, 2015, Ramstein and Cholo were defeated in a Lucha de Apuestas by Soberano Jr. and Star Jr. and were both forced to unmask.

== Championships and accomplishments ==
- Comisión de Box y Lucha Libre Mexico D.F.
  - Distrito Federal Tag Team Championship (1 time) – with Sangre Azteca

== Luchas de Apuestas record ==
Winner (wager)	Loser (wager)	Location	Event	Date	Notes
Enemigo Publico (mask)	Fugaz (mask)	N/A	Live event	N/A	
Rayo Tapatío I (mask)	Fugaz (hair)	Ciudad Nezahualcóyotl, Mexico State	Live event	December 8, 1996	(Note: Lost a Relevos Suicidas match against Gran Petroneo and Rayo Tapatío I)
Damián 666 (hair)	Fugaz (hair)	Nuevo Laredo, Tamaulipas	Live event	July 30, 2001	
Ramstein (mask)	Explosion (mask)	Chimalhuacan, Mexico State	Live event	May 28, 2006	
Ramstein (mask)	Chac-Mol (mask)	Ciudad Nezahualcóyotl, Mexico State	Live event	April 5, 2007	
Ramstein (mask)	Tony Rivera (mask)	Ciudad Nezahualcóyotl, Mexico State	Live event	December 25, 2007	
Los Principes del Ring (masks) (Soberano Jr. and Star Jr.)	Ramstein and Cholo	Mexico City	CMLL Martes de Arena Mexico	January 6, 2014	
