= Los Guerreros Tuareg =

Professional wrestling stable

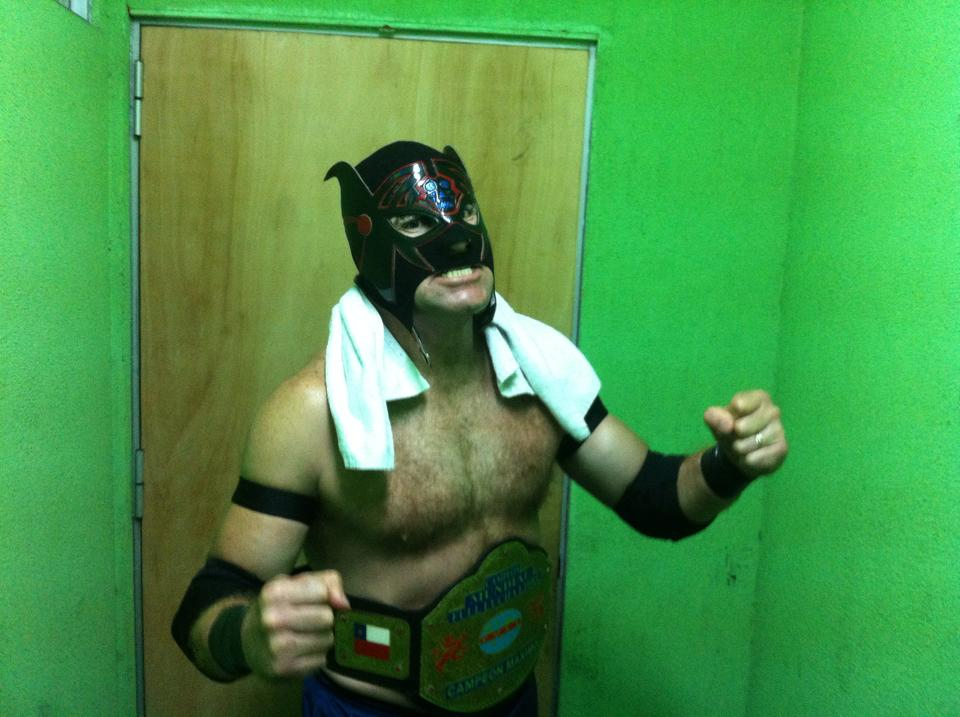
- Arkangel de la Muerte, the deputy leader of Los Guerreros Tuareg

Stable
- Members: Nitro (Leader); Arkangel de la Muerte (Deputy leader); Hooligan; Skándalo; Doctor X Sangre Azteca; Ramstein; Koreano; Loco Max
- Name(s): Los Rebeldes del Desierto; Los Rebeldes Tuareg; Pandilla Guerrera
- Debut: 2004 (Pandilla Guerrera); 2007 (Guerreros Tuareg)
- Disbanded: 2007 (Pandilla Guerrera); January 2015 (Guerreros Tuareg)

Los Guerreros Tuareg (Spanish for "The Tuareg Warriors") was a Mexican professional wrestling group, called a stable, that worked for Consejo Mundial de Lucha Libre (CMLL) as a rudo (term used for wrestlers who portray the "bad guys") faction. The group was the successor to Pandilla Guerrera ("Gang of Warriors") and was sometimes also referred to as Los Rebeldes del Desierto ("The Rebels of the Desert") or even Los Rebeldes Tuareg ("The Tuareg Rebels"). The group was quietly disbanded in 2014 as only three members remained with CMLL and stopped teaming up on a regular basis.

== History ==
=== Pandilla Guerrera (2004–2007) ===
In 2005, Consejo Mundial de Lucha Libre (CMLL) created the Guapos University ("Hansome University"), or Guapos U, a storyline mimicking reality shows such as WWE Tough Enough, searching for a new member to join Shocker, Máscara Mágica and El Terrible as part of Los Guapos. The contestants included, among others, Sangre Azteca and El Koreano. During one of CMLL's shows, El Terrible turned on the group and was joined by Último Guerrero in the attack. Sangre Azteca and El Koreano prevented the rest of the Guapos U class in making the save, leading to the two of them being kicked out of the group. Guerrero immediately took both Sangre Azteca and Koreano under his wing, forming Pandilla Guerrera ("Gang of Warriors"), a mid-card group associated with Último Guerrero's Los Guerreros del Infierno group. Sangre Azteca would soon lead the group that would also include Nitro, Arkangel de la Muerte, Hooligan, Loco Max, Doctor X and Ramstein. Doctor X brought the Mexican National Welterweight Championship with him when he joined the group, but he lost it to La Mascara on May 5, 2005.

In early 2005, Sangre Azteca, Doctor X and Nitro won the Mexican National Trios Championship from Safari, El Felino and Volador Jr. Pandilla Guerra held the championship for 7 months and made three successful title defenses before they lost the championship to Máximo, El Texano, Jr. and El Sagrado. The team would attempt to regain the championship twice, but failed in each attempt. El Koreano did not stay with the group long, changing his ring name and adopting a mask as he began working as "Apocalipsis", with no reference to his previous character. Due to CMLL's working relationship with International Wrestling Revolution Group (IWRG), Nitro was able to win the IWRG Intercontinental Middleweight Championship from La Pantera, but only held it for 14 days before losing it to Pentagon Black. On December 17, 2006, Sangre Azteca defeated La Mascara to bring the Mexican National Welterweight Championship back to Pandilla Guerrera. Pandilla Guerrera remained solidly entrenched in the CMLL mid-card, working primarily with younger tecnicos (Spanish term for a wrestler who plays a "good guy" character), helping them gain experience in the ring. Over time Ramstein appeared less frequently with Pandilla Guerrera, unofficially leaving the group.

=== Los Guerreros Tuareg (2007–2015) ===
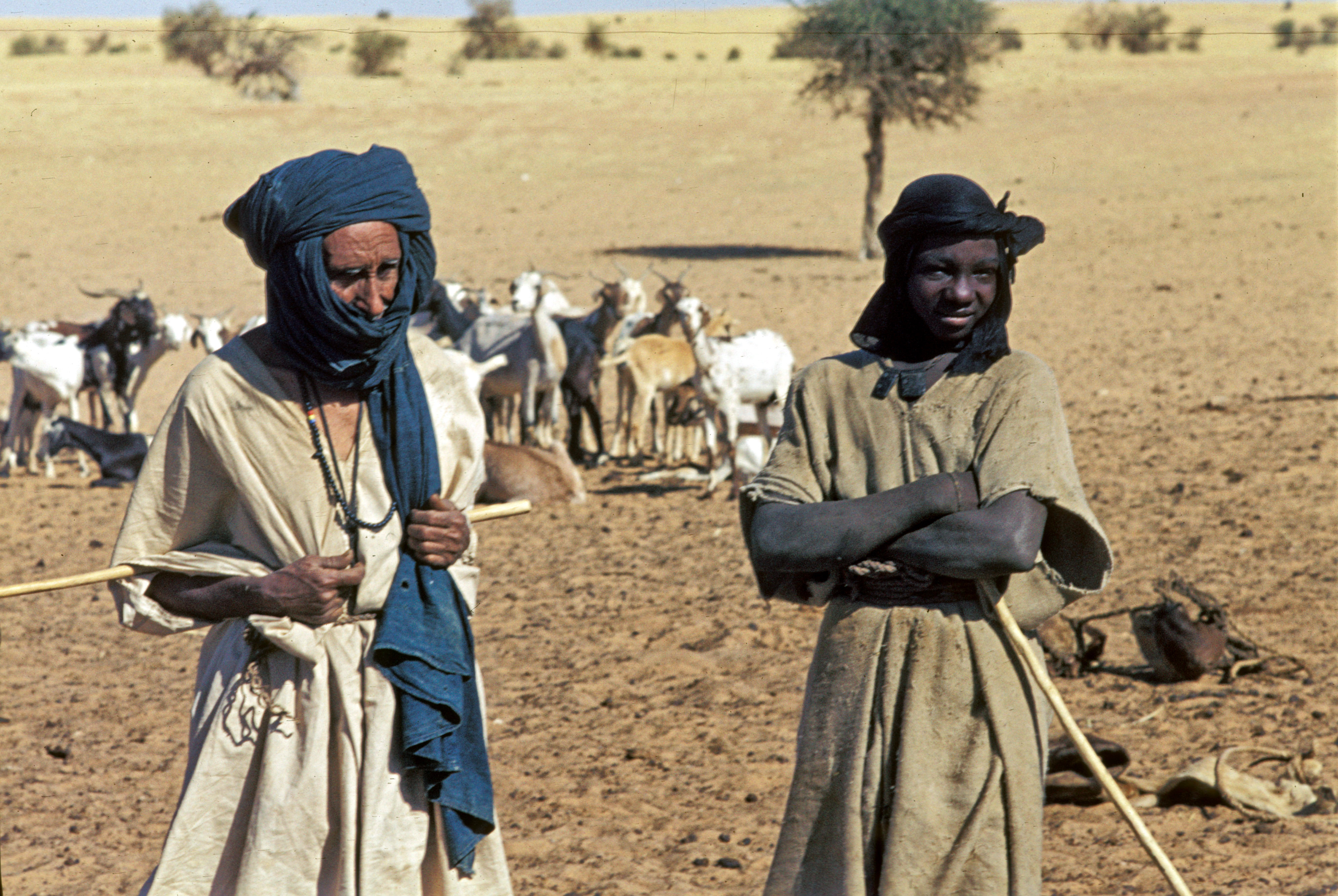
Tuareg nomads, the inspiration for the groups ring wear and entrance music

In mid-2007, Pandilla Guerrera decided to pull away from Los Guerreros del Infierno to create their own separate identity in order to gain more success in CMLL. The group added Skándalo to its roster while Sangre Azteca decided to join Los Guerreros instead; in his absence, Nitro took over as the leader of the group. The group was repackaged as Los Guerreros Tuareg ("The Tuareg Warriors"), inspired by the Tuareg Nomadic tribe, which was reflected in the robes and headgear the team wore to the ring and a more African tribal type of entrance music. When Guerrero complained that the Guerreros Tuareg name was too close to his team, they were renamed Los Rebeldes del Desierto ("The Rebels of the Desert") and also referred to as Los Rebeldes Tuareg. However, the angle with Guerrero was quietly abandoned and the group reverted to the Guerreros Tuareg moniker.

Nitro and Skándalo teamed up to participate in a CMLL Arena Coliseo Tag Team Championship tournament in the summer of 2008. In the first round, the duo won by defeating Sensei and Neutron. In the next round, they lost to Flash and Stuka, Jr. Guerreros Tuareg had two teams participate as Arkangel teamed up with Hooligan for the tournament, losing to Mascara Purpura and Tony Rivera in the quarterfinals. In early 2009, Nitro was injured and undergoing double knee surgery, causing him to miss eight months out of action, forcing Arkangel de la Muerte to step in as leader. During Nitro's time away from the ring, CMLL introduced the Mini-Estrella Pequeño Nitro, the leader of Los Pequeño Guerreros Tuareg, the first and so far only member of the group. By late 2009, Nitro was able to return in full condition and kept teaming with his fellow Guerreros Tuareg, although not achieving the success they were hoping for when changing their team name and image. When a new mid-card rudo team, called Los Cancerberos del Infierno, was created in 2009, Los Guerreros Tuareg talked about challenging Los Cancerberos, but no actual storyline came of it. In 2011, Doctor X left CMLL, and the following year, Loco Max left the company as well, reducing the visibility of the group. In February 2015, Guerreros Tuareg member Hooligan was given a new ring character, Luciferno, who then became a member of Los Hijos del Infierno ("The Sons of the Inferno"), effectively ending the Guerreros Tuareg group without an official announcement that the group was disbanded.

== Championships and accomplishments ==
Championships won while members of Pandilla Guerra or Los Guerreros Tuareg are listed.

- Consejo Mundial de Lucha Libre
  - Mexican National Trios Championship (1 time) – Sangre Azteca, Doctor X and Nitro
  - Mexican National Welterweight Championship (2 times) – Doctor X, Sangre Azteca
- International Wrestling Revolution Group
  - IWRG Intercontinental Middleweight Championship (1 time) – Nitro

== Luchas de Apuestas record ==
Winner (wager)	Loser (wager)	Location	Event	Date	Notes
Máximo (hair)	Loco Max (hair)	Mexico City	Live event	June 5, 2006	
Leono (hair)	Loco Max (hair)	Puebla, Puebla	Live event	June 4, 2007	
Loco Max (hair)	Tony Rivera (hair)	Mexico City	Live event	October 5, 2008	
Mictlán (hair)	Loco Max (hair)	Mexico City	Live event	December 2, 2008	
Loco Max (hair)	Centella de Oro (hair)	Puebla, Puebla	Live event	July 19, 2010	
Rush (hair)	Loco Max (hair)	Mexico City	Live event	August 15, 2010	
Nitro (mask)	Galatico (mask)	San Luis Potosí, San Luis Potosí	Live event	December 15, 2010	(Note: Final of a Relevos Suicidas match that also included Bogar and Diamante.)
Nitro (mask)	Power (mask)	Mexico State	Live event	January 1, 2011	(Note: Finals of a Relevos Suicidas match that also included Corsario Negro and Corsario Negro, Jr.)
Loco Max (hair)	Escorpión (hair)	Puebla, Puebla	Live event	March 14, 2011	
Palacio Negro (mask)	Loco Max (hair)	Guadalajara, Jalisco	Live event	September 30, 2011	(Note: 14 man Steel cage match that also involved Metal Blanco, Toscano, Guerrero Maya, Jr., Ángel de Plata, Delta, Okumura, Leono, Yoshihashi, Leo, Maléfico, Sagrado and Pólvora)
Virus (hair)	Loco Max (hair)	Puebla, Puebla	Live event	March 12, 2012	
