= Violencia =

Mexican professional wrestler

Personal information
- Born: Blas Colunga; December 10, 1968 (age 57) Matamoros, Tamaulipas, Mexico

Professional wrestling career
- Ring name(s): Águila Real; Rey Águila; Lynx; Violencia'
- Billed height: 175 cm (5 ft 9 in)
- Billed weight: 98 kg (216 lb)
- Billed from: Puerto Rico.
- Trained by: Dragón; Tarzán Moreno; Jorge de la Cruz; Rafael Salamanca
- Debut: December 16, 1986
- Retired: 2010

Blas Columba (born December 10, 1968, in Matamoros, Tamaulipas, Mexico) is a retired Mexican professional wrestler, best known under the ring name Violencia (Spanish for "Violence") and has previously also worked under the ring names Águila Real ("Royal Eagle"), Rey Águila ("King Eagle") and Lynx. As Violencia he was nicknamed El Búfalo ("The Buffalo") due to the large horns protruding from his wrestling mask. He was one of the main members of the Consejo Mundial de Lucha Libre (CMLL) group known as Los Boricuas where he portrayed a Puerto Rican loyalist for several years. Columba is not related to wrestler Violencia Jr. but did allow him to use the name

== Professional wrestling career ==
Columba trained for his professional wrestling career with trainers Dragón, Tarzán Moreno, Jorge de la Cruz and Rafael Salamanca prior to making his in-ring debut.

=== Águila Real (1986–1991) ===
He made his debut on December 16, 1986, as the masked character Águila Real ("Royal Eagle") working primarily in and around his native Tamaulipas early in his career.

=== Rey Águila (1991) ===
In 1991 he started working for promotion Consejo Mundial de Lucha Libre (CMLL) where he modified his name to Rey Águila ("King Eagle"). On September 1, 1991, he won his first ever Lucha de Apuesta, or bet match, forcing his opponent Charger to unmask. The Apuesta victory marked his first significant success with CMLL.

=== Lynx (1992–1997) ===
After working as Rey Águila for a few months CMLL decided to change his ring character to Lynx instead, giving him a "big cat" character instead, complete with a mask adored with ears and the markings of whiskers. On July 28, 1996, Lynx defeated Ángel de Plata (Note: Not the wrestler who currently works as Niebla Roja and previous worked as Ángel de Plata.) to unmask him.

=== Violencia (1997–2010) ===
In 1997 Columba dropped the "Lynx" character and instead adopted a new rudo (Mexican Spanish term used to refer to professional wrestlers as heels) character known as Violencia ("Violence") while working for CMLL. For a short period of time he teamed with Violencia II but that character was only used for a couple of matches. On December 23, 1998, Columba, working as Violencia, was given the Distrito Federal Heavyweight Championship after he defeated Brazo de Oro on a local show in Mexico City. He would hold the championship into 1999, but records were not clear on what date he lost the championship to Brazo de Oro. On October 24, 1999, Violencia regained the championship from Brazo de Oro. At some point in the early 2000s the Districo Federal Heavyweight Championship was phased out, leaving it inactive without an official announcement.

==== Los Boricuas (2000–2003) ====
In 1999 Pierroth Jr. returned to CMLL after an extended stay in Puerto Rico. Upon his return Pierroth Jr. declared that he was a Boricua, or Puerto Rican, declaring the superiority of the Puerto Rican people. He began teaming up with Gran Markus Jr. who also adopted the "Boricua" loyalty. Within weeks the duo became known officially as Los Boricuas and started to grow from a two-man team to a multi-man stable when they added the masked El Boricua and later on Veneno. In mid-2000 they added Violencia to the group, replacing El Boricua. At that point in time Los Boricuas began a storyline feud with Los Capos (Cien Caras, Máscara Año 2000, Universo 2000 and Apolo Dantés), by June 2001 the group added Poder Boricua ("Puerto Rican Power") to the group, as well as veteran wrestler the Killer and Mini-Estrella Pequeno Violencia to the group to strengthen their numbers. At the CMLL 68th Anniversary Show the team of Gran Markus, Jr., Poder Boricua and Violencia unsuccessfully challenged for the Mexican National Trios Championship, losing to champions Mr. Niebla, Olímpico and Safari In subsequent months Poder Boricua left the group as well, changing his name to "Poder Mexican" ("Mexican Power") and began working opposite the rest of Los Boricuas. On July 14, 2002, Violencia and Veneno won a Lucha de Apuestas match over Poder Mexica and Mr. Mexico as a result Poder Mexica was forced to unmask and Mr. Mexico was shaved bald. The last remaining storyline for Los Boricuas saw Violencia leave the group, which at the time was basically himself and Pierroth and had Pierroth unmask Violencia at the CMLL 70th Anniversary Show. In subsequent months Pierroth began teaming on a regular basis with Vampiro and Tarzan Boy, ending the Los Boricuas faction in CMLL.

Following his mask loss Violencia would twice lose a Lucha de Apuestas match where he was forced to have all his hair shaved off. First to El Satánico on August 16, 2005, in Puebla, Puebla, secondly to Shocker seven months later on March 31, 2015. By early 2005 Violencia left CMLL and only worked sporadically through 2005, taking bookings on the Mexican independent circuit. At that point Columba either retired from wrestling or adopted a different masked persona, there are no records of him wrestling except a match in 2009 and one in 2010, making it most likely that he has retired from wrestling altogether.

== Championships and accomplishments ==
- Consejo Mundial de Lucha Libre

- Distrito Federal Heavyweight Championship (2 times)

== Luchas de Apuestas record ==
Winner (wager)	Loser (wager)	Location	Event	Date	Notes
Rey Águila (mask)	Charger (mask)	Mexico City	live event	September 1, 1991	
Lynx (mask)	Ángel de Plata (mask)	Mexico City	Live event	July 28, 1996	
Violencia (mask)	Relámpago (mask)	N/A	Live event	N/A	
Violencia (mask) and Veneno (hair)	Poder Mexica (mask) and Mr. México (hair)	Mexico City	CMLL show	July 14, 2002	
Violencia (mask)	Golden Dragon	Cuernavaca, Morelos	Live event	August 7, 2003	
Pierroth Jr. (hair)	Violencia (mask)	Mexico City	CMLL 70th Anniversary Show	September 19, 2003	
Violencia (hair)	Maniacop (hair)	Puebla, Puebla	Live event	August 2, 2004	
El Satánico (hair)	Violencia (hair)	Puebla, Puebla	Live event	August 16, 2004	
Shocker (hair)	Violencia (hair)	N/A	No Manches TV Show	March 31, 2005	
