= Bengala (CMLL) =

Mexican professional wrestler

Personal information
- Born: September 17, 1978 (age 47); September 17, 1982 (Note: To maintain the illusion that Bengala is a separate, younger wrestler CMLL often lists his birthdate as September 17, 1982, exactly four years younger than the actual birthdate) Nezahualcoyotl, Mexico State, Mexico City (Note: To maintain the illusion that Bengala is a separate wrestler CMLL often lists his birth location as Mexico City)

Professional wrestling career
- Ring name(s): Bengala; Príncipe Odín Jr. Sombra de Plata
- Billed height: 1.70 m (5 ft 7 in)
- Billed weight: 81 kg (179 lb)
- Trained by: César Curiel; Diablo Velazco; Príncipe Odin; Negro Casas; Tony Salazar; Franco Colombo; La Pantera
- Debut: October 13, 1991

Bengala is a Mexican professional wrestler working for the promotion Consejo Mundial de Lucha Libre (CMLL) portraying a tecnico ("Good guy") wrestling character. Bengala's real name is not a matter of public record, as is often the case with masked wrestlers in Mexico where their private lives are kept a secret from the wrestling fans. He previously wrestled for many years under the ring name Sombra de Plata (Spanish for "Silver Shadow"), but changed his ring persona in 2009, a move that is not acknowledged in storyline terms.

== Personal life ==
Bengala was born on September 17, 1978, in Nezahualcoyotl, Mexico State, the oldest son of professional wrestler Príncipe Odín (Prince Odin). His younger brothers are active wrestlers under the ring names Artillero, Super Comando, Príncipe Odín Jr. and Babe Torres. His full name is not publicly known, which is traditionally the case in Lucha Libre when a wrestler has never been unmasked, but it is known that their last name is Torres Ramirez, revealed when his brother Daniel Torres Ramirez (Babe Torres) was unmasked. Due to the storyline that the Bengala character is to be a younger wrestler Consejo Mundial de Lucha Libre (CMLL) uses the date September 17, 1982 instead, making him exactly 4 years younger in storyline terms.

== Professional wrestling career ==
He began his professional wrestling career under the ring name Príncipe Odín Jr. ("Prince Odin Jr.), an enmascarado ("masked wrestler") character based on his father Principe Odin, the same name his younger brother would take over. As Principe Odin Jr. he worked primarily on the Mexican independent circuit from his debut in 1991 until around 1999.

=== Sombra de Plata (1998–2009) ===
A number of wrestlers have used the ring name Sombra de Plata ("Silver Shadow") over the years, which leads to some confusion as to who played the role at what point in time. It has been established that the person under the Sombra de Plata mask that made his Consejo Mundial de Lucha Libre (CMLL) debut in 1998 was new to the character at the time and the last person to use the ring name up until now. He made his debut as the enmascarado Sombra de Plata in mid-1999, from this point forward he worked primarily for CMLL or on CMLL affiliated shows. On July 16, 1999, Sombra de Plata teamed up with Ricky Marvin, losing to Fugaz and Sangre Azteca in match that stole the show, earning four youngsters a standing ovation from the crowd. The success of this match earned all four a match at CMLL's biggest show of the year the CMLL 66th Anniversary Show, which took place on September 24, 1999. This time Marvin and Sombra de Plata won the match. Sombra de Plata was teamed up with the veteran Lizmark to participate in the 1999 Gran Alternativa tournament, where a rookie and a veteran teams up. The tournament took place on December 17, 1999, and saw Sombra de Plata and Lizmark lose to Scorpio Jr. and Fugaz in the opening round. He also earned a spot on the CMLL 67th Anniversary Show, teamin with Mano Negra Jr. as they lost to the team of Alan and Chris Stone CMLL decided to bring back the long dormant CMLL Arena Coliseo Tag Team Championship, title for the low- to mid-level teams in their promotion and held a tournament to establish the first champions. Regular partners Sombra de Plata and Ricky Marvin teamed up for the tournament. They defeated the team of Enemigo Public and Masada in the first round, but were defeated by Alan and Chris Stone in the second round, who would go on to win the tournament and the championship. A few months later, on December 15, 2000, he teamed up with Ricky Marvin as part of the 2000 Sin Piedad super show to defeat Alan and Chris Stone in a non-title match. In 2003 CMLL created a new championship, the CMLL World Super Lightweight Championship, officially for wrestlers in the 70 kg (150 lb) and 73 kg (161 lb) weight range, although the exact limits were never strictly enforced. Sombre de Plata was one of 12 wrestlers who participated in a torneo cibernetico, multi-man elimination match, but did not move on to the final stages of the tournament. Sombra de Plata took part in the 2007 Reyes del Aire tournament that took place on February 16, 2007, on CMLL's weekly Super Viernes show. The tournament featured a mix of 16 low and mid ranked wrestlers and saw Sombra de Plata eliminated by Super Nova as the first person eliminated from the tournament. He wrestled his last match under the Sombra de Plata character on April 17, 2009, when he teamed up with Ángel Azteca Jr. to defeat Puma King and Tiger Kid in the opening match of that week's Super Viernes show.

=== Bengala (2009–present) ===
CMLL decided to repackage Sombra de Plata, give him a new ring character, name, mask, and overall look. They decided to introduce him as "Bengala" with a mask and full body suit inspired by the Bengal tiger, complete with fake ears and stripes. With the mask and full suit covered up all identifying physical characteristics that would indicate that he was the former Sombra de Plata, CMLL even created a "cover story" for him, de-aged him by four years and had him claim he had been training at the CMLL Training school for four years before his debut. He teamed up with Molotov to defeat Cholo and Zayco in the opening match of CMLL's May 15, 2009, show in Arena Mexico. The cover was maintained for several months, until Bengala began using the La Sombrina finishing hold identically to how he executed it while working as Sombra de Plata. Since then Bengala has settled down in his role as a low ranking tecnico worker, who helps CMLL trainees and rookies gain in-ring experience.

Bengala suffered a leg injury in early 2024 and underwent surgery in March. As of summer 2025, he was still in the process of working towards an in-ring return.

== Luchas de Apuestas record ==
Winner (wager)	Loser (wager)	Location	Event	Date	Notes
Sombra de Plata (mask)	El Halcón (Note: This was not the original El Halcón)	N/A	Live event	N/A	
Sombra de Plata (mask)	Flecha (hair)	State of Mexico	Live event	July 7, 2007	
