= Tigre Blanco =

Mexican professional wrestler

Personal information
- Born: Sergio Guzmán Silva; October 8, 1974 (age 51) Mexico City, Mexico

Professional wrestling career
- Ring name(s): Kid Guzmán; Tigre Blanco
- Billed height: 1.73 m (5 ft 8 in)
- Billed weight: 85 kg (187 lb)
- Billed from: Mexico City, Mexico
- Trained by: Tony Salazar; Bala de Plata; Viento Negro; Satánico
- Debut: February 2, 1995
- Retired: 2013

Sergio Guzmán Silva (b. October 8, 1974) is a Mexican professional wrestler, who worked for the Mexican promotion Consejo Mundial de Lucha Libre (CMLL) for most of his professional career. Guzmán works under the ring name Tigre Blanco and initially worked as Kid Guzmán but changed identities in 1999. Guzmán’s real name was not a matter of public record until he lost his "Tigre Blanco" mask on September 18, 2009, and announced his real name as a result. Tigre Blanco is Spanish for "White Tiger", a name that is reflected by his mask, designed to look like the head of a white tiger.

== Professional wrestling career ==
Guzmán made his professional wrestling debut on February 2, 1995, under the ring name "Kid Guzmán". Initially Kid Guzmán worked for the Asistencia Asesoría y Administración (AAA), winning the UWA World Welterweight Championship from Super Crazy in 1997. (Note: the Universal Wrestling Association closed in 1995 but the UWA Championships remained active, promoted by various groups. the UWA World Welterweight Championship was promoted by AAA from 1995 and until at least 2000) Kid Guzmán held the title for more than a year before losing it back to Super Crazy.

By 1999 Kid Guzmán had signed with Consejo Mundial de Lucha Libre (CMLL) and changed his ring persona. He became an masked wrestler under the name Tigre Blanco, wearing an outfit and mask patterned after a white tiger. Tigre Blanco made his first pay-per-view appearance on July 18, 1999, as he participated in CMLL's 1999 Ruleta de la Muerte. The match saw Satánico, Zumbido, Valentin Mayo, Virus, and Rencor Latino defeat Tigre Blanco, Starman, Astro Rey, Jr., El Oriental, and Mr. Águila in an elimination match. On December 17, 1999, Tigre Blanco teamed with El Felino to win the second 1999 Tornero Gran Alternativa, defeating Máscara Año 2000 and Sangre Azteca in the first round, Ringo Mendoza and Ricky Marvin in the second round, and Scorpio, Jr. and Fugaz in the finals to win the tournament. On March 17, 2000, the team of Arkangel de la Muerte, Dr. O'Borman, Jr., Último Guerrero, Zumbido, Rencor Latino, Mr. Mexico, Violencia and Rey Bucanero defeated Tigre Blanco, Máscara Mágica, Astro Rey Jr., Starman, Antifaz, Tony Rivera, Safari, and Olímpico in an elimination match as part of CMLL's March 2000 pay-per-view. Tigre Blanco eliminated Doctor O'Borman, Jr. but was himself eliminated by Zumbido. On April 17, 2001, Tigre Blanco defeated Karloff Lagarde, Jr. to win the Mexican National Welterweight Championship. Following his title win, Tigre Blanco teamed with Ricky Marvin and Sicodelico, Jr., losing to Doctor X, Virus and Mr. Mexico on CMLL's 68th Anniversary Show. On December 14, 2001, Tigre Blanco made another PPV appearance, teaming with Volador Jr. and Tony Rivera, in a loss against Venero, Dr. X and Hijo de Pierroth. In 2001 Tigre Blanco once again participated in the annual Torneo Gran Alternativa, teaming with Black Tiger, losing to Black Warrior and Sangre Azteca in the first round. Tigre Blanco held the Mexican National Welterweight title for almost two years, making only one title defense in that time before losing the title to Doctor X on March 11, 2003. In 2005 Tigre Blanco participated in the inaugural Reyes del Aire tournament, eliminating Stuka, Jr. before being eliminated by Alan Stone. In 2006 Blanco was teamed up with Tigre Metalico (Metal Tiger) and rookie Rey Tigre (King Tiger) to form the group Los Tigres del Ring (The Tigers of the ring). The trio worked together throughout 2006 until Rey Tigre was repackaged as Eclipse. The Tigres del Ring officially disbanded in 2007 when Tigre Metalico changed his ring name to Metalico; however Tigre Blanco and Metalico continued teaming, working lower card matches together. On October 18, 2009, Tigre Blanco lost his mask as he was pinned by Pólvora in a 12-man Luchas de Apuestas cage match. After the match he was forced to unmask and announce his real name per lucha libre tradition.

Guzman’s last known match was a tag team Lucha de Apuestas on January 1, 2013 in CMLL’s Arena México, wherein he and Leono both lost their hair to the tandem of Bobby Zavala and Disturbio. The match - which saw Guzman specifically fight to the bitter end for his team - was received positively enough by the crowd to have money thrown into the ring (a lucha tradition for especially great performances), and was treated as his retirement bout.

== Championships and accomplishments ==
- Asistencia Asesoría y Administración
  - UWA World Welterweight Championship (1 time)
- Consejo Mundial de Lucha Libre
  - Mexican National Welterweight Championship (1 time)
  - Torneo Gran Alternativa: 1999 (II) – with El Felino

== Luchas de Apuestas record ==
Winner (wager)	Loser (wager)	Location	Event	Date	Notes
Kid Guzmán (hair)	Loco Valentino (hair)	Acapulco, Guerrero	Live event	January 15, 1995	(Note: This was a three-way match that also included Babe Star.)
Super Crazy (hair)	Kid Guzmán (hair)	Nezahualcoyotl, State of Mexico	Live event	1996	
Kid Guzmán (hair)	Histrión (hair)	Acapulco, Guerrero	Live event	April 21, 1999	
Américo Rocca (hair)	Kid Guzmán (hair)	Mexico City	Live event	April 27, 1999	
Tigre Blanco (mask)	Super Cacao (mask)	Mexico City	Live event	October 19, 1999	
Tigre Blanco (mask)	Tarahumara (mask)	Puebla, Puebla	Live event	July 15, 2002	
Skayde and Tigre Blanco (masks)	Night Ranger and Street Fire (masks)	Cuernavaca, Morelos	Live event	December 5, 2002	
Pólvora (mask)	Tigre Blanco (mask)	Mexico City	CMLL Live event	October 18, 2009	(Note: This was a twelve-man Lucha de Apuesta steel cage match..)
Bobby Zavala and Disturbio (hair)	Tigre Blanco and Leono (hair)	Mexico City	CMLL Live event	January 1, 2013	
