= Nitro (wrestler) =

Mexican professional wrestler

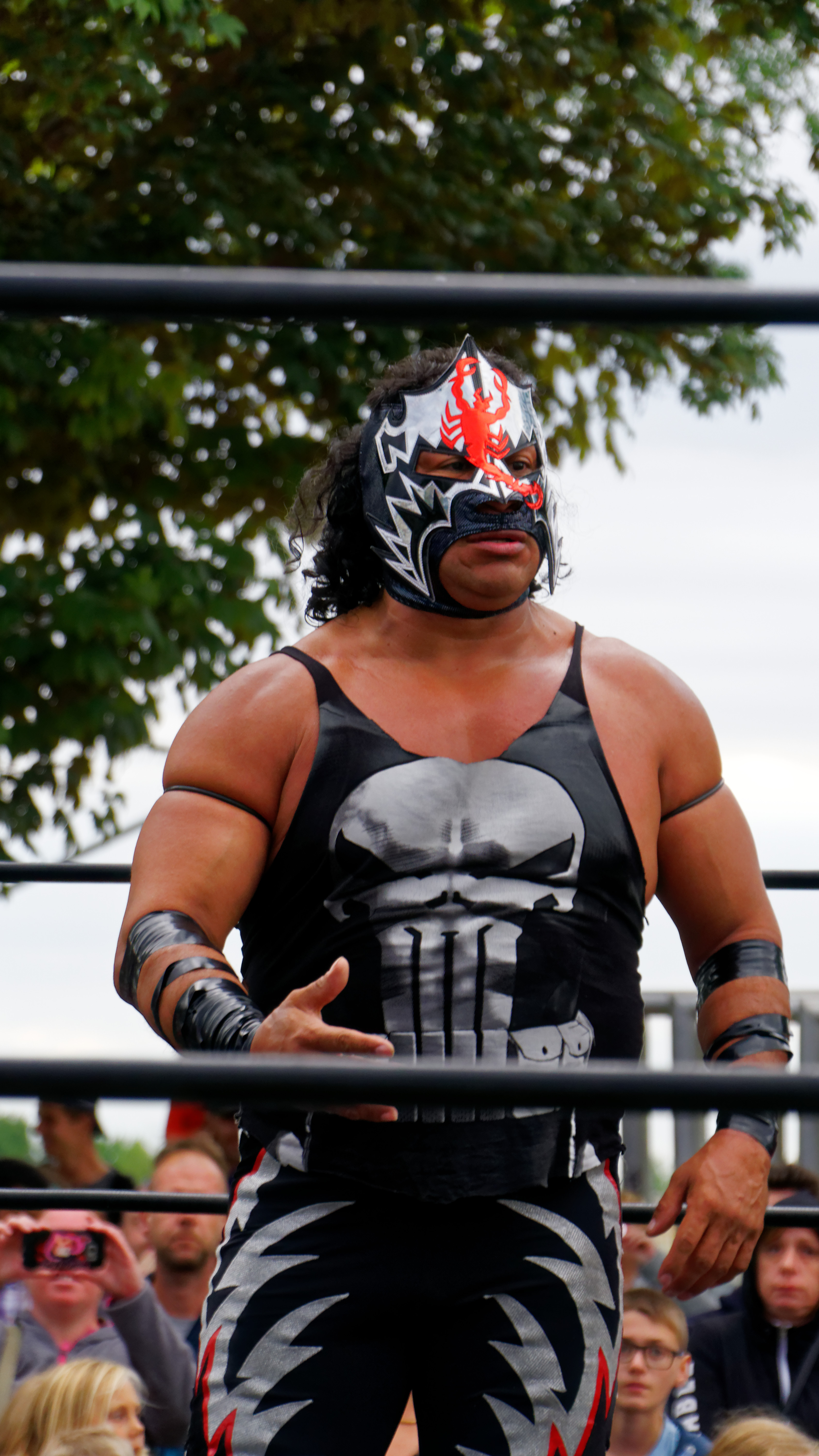
- Nitro in the ring during an outdoor show in France

Personal information
- Born: May 10, 1967 (age 59) Mexico City. Mexico

Professional wrestling career
- Ring name(s): Filoso; Nitro
- Billed height: 1.73 m (5 ft 8 in)
- Billed weight: 84 kg (185 lb)
- Trained by: Faisan; Pepe Casas; El Satánico
- Debut: 1984

Nitro is a Mexican professional wrestler active as a rudo (heel) in Consejo Mundial de Lucha Libre. He is in a stable called Los Guerreros Tuareg. Nitro's real name is not a matter of public record, as is often the case with masked wrestlers in Mexico where their private lives are kept a secret from the professional wrestling fans.

== Professional wrestling career ==
=== Consejo Mundial de Lucha Libre ===
In early 1992, Nitro joined CMLL under the gimmick of Filiso as a tecnico who was on the undercard. By 1996, Filiso participated in a tournament for entry into the Torneo Gran Alternativa, but failed to qualify. He did not find much success for many years in CMLL, until he was reintroduced as Nitro in 2002. When re-debuting he joined Pierroth's evolving Los Boricua stable. On July 14, 2002, Nitro teamed with Doctor X and Virus to defeat Super Muñeco, Super Raton, and Super Pinocchio. Later on in 2005, he joined the Pandilla Guerrera group, also including Sangre Azteca and Doctor X. The trio eventually won the Mexican National Trios Championship on March 25, 2005, defeating Safari, El Felino, and Volador Jr. After winning the trios titles, Nitro participated in the Torneo Gran Alternativa teaming with Pierroth. In the quarter-finals, Pierroth and Nitro lost to Dr. Wagner, Jr. and Misterioso, Jr. On October 10, 2005, Nitro and his team lost the trios championship to El Sagrado, El Texano, Jr., and Máximo. In 2006, Nitro participated in the Torneo Gran Alternativa, this time teaming with Último Guerrero. In the quarter-finals, the duo defeated Dos Caras, Jr. and Volador Jr., and in the semi-finals they defeated Rey Bucanero and Loco Max. In the final, they lost to Perro Aguayo, Jr. and Misterioso, Jr. At this time CMLL and IWRG had an agreement on exchanging wrestlers, and Nitro began wrestling in IWRG. On October 1, 2006, he won the IWRG Intercontinental Middleweight Championship defeating El Pantera. His reign as champion was short-lived, as he lost the championship to Pentagon Black on October 15, 2006. In 2008, Nitro created a new group called Los Guerreros Tuareg. He teamed with Skandalo to participate in a CMLL Arena Coliseo Tag Team Title Tournament in mid-2008. In the first round the duo won by defeating Sensei and Neutron. In the next round they lost to Flash and Stuka, Jr. In early 2009, Nitro was injured and underwent double knee surgery, resulting in an eight-month hiatus. Nitro kept teaming with his Guerreros Tuareg teammates. Nitro suffered a broken kneecap during a match on August 15, 2012. In a later interview Nitro stated that he was hoping to return November 15, 2012.

== Championship and accomplishment ==
- Consejo Mundial de Lucha Libre
  - Mexican National Trios Championship (1 time) – with Doctor X and Sangre Azteca
- International Wrestling Revolution Group
  - IWRG Intercontinental Middleweight Championship (1 time)

== Luchas de Apuestas record ==
Winner (wager)	Loser (wager)	Location	Event	Date	Notes
Nitro (mask)	Brazo de Oro (hair)	Tlalnepantla, State of Mexico	CMLL show	March 4, 2002	(Note: Steel cage match that also included Pierroth, Violencia, Brazo de Oro Jr. and Brazo de Plata.)
Nitro (mask)	Galatico (mask)	San Luis Potosí, San Luis Potosí	CMLL show	December 15, 2010	(Note: Final of a Relevos Suicidas match that also included Bogar and Diamante.)
Nitro (mask)	Power (mask)	State of Mexico	CMLL show	January 1, 2011	(Note: Finals of a Relevos Suicidas match that also included Corsario Negro and Corsario Negro, Jr.)
