= Doctor X (wrestler) =

Mexican professional wrestler

- Dr. X prior to a match.

Personal information
- Born: Clemente Marcelino Valencia Nájera; 17 July 1968 Mexico City, Mexico
- Died: 11 October 2011 (aged 43) Iztapalapa, Mexico City

Professional wrestling career
- Ring name(s): Doctor O'Borman Jr. Doctor X Doctor X-Treme
- Billed height: 1.73 m (5 ft 8 in)
- Billed weight: 80 kg (176 lb)
- Billed from: Mexico City, Mexico
- Trained by: Rafael Salamanca; La Cobra; Scorpio (Sr.); Memo Díaz; El Satánico
- Debut: 18 March 1995

Clemente Marcelino Valencia Nájera (17 July 1968 – 11 October 2011) was a Mexican professional wrestler, better known by the ring name Doctor X. He worked for the Mexican promotion Consejo Mundial de Lucha Libre (CMLL) for most of his career, winning the Mexican National Welterweight Championship and the Mexican National Trios Championship, teaming with Sangre Azteca and Nitro.

Doctor X was a member of Pandilla Guerreras and co-leader of Los Guerreros Tuareg. In August 2011, he quit CMLL and joined Perros del Mal Producciones under the more extreme ring name Doctor X-Treme. He had previously worked as Dr. O'Borman Jr., a name he licensed from the original Dr. O'Borman.

Throughout his career, Doctor X's real name and personal life was not a matter of public record, as is often the case with masked wrestlers in Mexico. In 2011, he was killed while trying to break up a fight.

== Professional wrestling career ==
=== Consejo Mundial de Lucha Libre (1996–2011) ===
==== Early years (1996–2005) ====
Valencia began his professional wrestling career in 1995 after training under Rafael Salamanca, La Cobra and Scorpio (Sr.); he later received additional training from Memo Díaz and El Satánico. Initially, he worked as Dr. O'Borman Jr., paying the original Dr. O'Borman for the use of the name. By the end of the 1990s, he began working regularly for Consejo Mundial de Lucha Libre (CMLL). By 2000, problems with who had the right to the name "Dr. O'Borman Jr." arose, forcing him to give up the name. Together with CMLL owner Paco Alonso, they came up with the concept of "Doctor X", an "evil doctor" in the vein of Dr. Wagner Jr., wearing all white with a big "X" on his mask (which, along with his outfits, grew increasingly colorful over time).

Doctor X's first real chance to prove himself came in 2001, as he was paired with Gran Markus Jr. in that year's Torneo Gran Alternativa ("Great Alternative Tournament"), losing to eventual winners Olímpico and Sicodelico Jr. in the first round. Over the following years, he kept working low card matches, slowly establishing a name for himself. In early 2003, Doctor X began a storyline feud with Tigre Blanco, whom he defeated on 11 March to win the Mexican National Welterweight Championship, which he held for over two years. In 2004, he once again competed in the Torneo Gran Alternativa, this time with Último Guerrero. The team defeated Último Dragón and Neutron in the first round and Shocker and Alan Stone in the second round, before losing to El Hijo del Santo and Místico in the finals.

==== Pandilla Guerrera (2005–2007) ====
In early 2005, the wrestling group Los Guerreros del Infierno created an affiliated group of low to mid-carders called Pandilla Guerrera (Spanish for "Gang of Warriors"), including Doctor X, Nitro, Sangre Azteca, Hooligan and several others. On 25 March, Doctor X teamed up with fellow Pandilla Guerrera members Azteca and Nitro to defeat El Felino, Safari and Volador Jr. for the Mexican National Trios Championship. Doctor X remained as a double champion for two months, losing the Mexican National Welterweight Championship to La Máscara on 13 May. Guerrero Pandilla's trios title reign lasted 196 days before losing it to Máximo, El Sagrado and El Texano Jr. Doctor X was paired with Universo 2000 for that year's Torneo Gran Alternativa. In the first round, the team defeated Bronco and El Texano Jr. before losing to eventual winners Dr. Wagner Jr. and Misterioso Jr. in the semi-finals.

==== Guerreros Tuareg (2007–2011) ====
In 2007, most members of Pandilla Guerrera broke away from Los Guerreros del Infierno, wanting to break out of their shadow and move up the rankings themselves. Doctor X, Arkangel de la Muerte, Nitro, Skándalo, Hooligan and Loco Max formed a group originally known as Rebeldes del Desierto ("Rebels of the Desert") and later called Los Guerreros Tuareg ("The Tuareg Warriors"). Despite objections from Los Guerreros del Infierno that the name was too close to theirs, it stuck with the group. Doctor X became the interim co-leader of Guerreros Tuareg, along with Arkangel, when Nitro suffered a serious injury in early 2009. However, Doctor X did not work regularly in Arena México, CMLL's main arena, something which he expressed his unhappiness with, stating that he felt passed over for wrestlers with "1/10" his talent. On 18 October 2009, Doctor X was one of twelve wrestlers who put his mask on the line in a steel cage match, contested under Lucha de Apuestas ("bet match") rules. He was the fifth person to escape the cage, keeping his mask safe.

In April 2010, Doctor X began a feud with Fabián el Gitano, which saw both wrestlers intentionally get disqualified several times as they tore each other's masks off. During the twelve-man Lucha de Apuestas steel cage match in the main event of Infierno en el Ring ("Inferno in the Ring") on July 19, Doctor X primarily targeted Fabián el Gitano, but in the end, decided to leave the cage instead of trying to unmask Fabián. In the end, Ángel de Oro defeated Fabián, who was unmasked in the process. Doctor X took part in another twelve-man steel cage match on Christmas day in Arena Neza, including both CMLL and independent luchadores, winning the mask of Hermano Muerte III. On 4 August 2011, it was reported that Doctor X had quit CMLL.

=== Perros del Mal Producciones (2011) ===
On 5 August 2011, Doctor X announced that he would join independent promotion Perros del Mal Producciones under the new ring name Doctor X-Treme. He wrestled his first match for the promotion later that same day.

== Death ==
On October 11, 2011, Valencia was shot in the head and killed when he tried to break up a fight while attending a religious party in Santa María Aztahuacán, Iztapalapa, Mexico City. He was survived by a wife and two children under the age of ten. On 16 July 2016, a torneo cibernetico was held in his honor, which featured wrestlers trained by Arkangel de la Muerte.

== Championships and accomplishments ==
- Consejo Mundial de Lucha Libre
  - Mexican National Welterweight Championship (1 time)
  - Mexican National Trios Championship (1 time) – with Sangre Azteca and Nitro as Pandilla Guerrera

== See also ==
- List of premature professional wrestling deaths
