= CMLL 64th Anniversary Show =

Mexican Professional wrestling showMexican Professional wrestling show

CMLL 64th Anniversary show
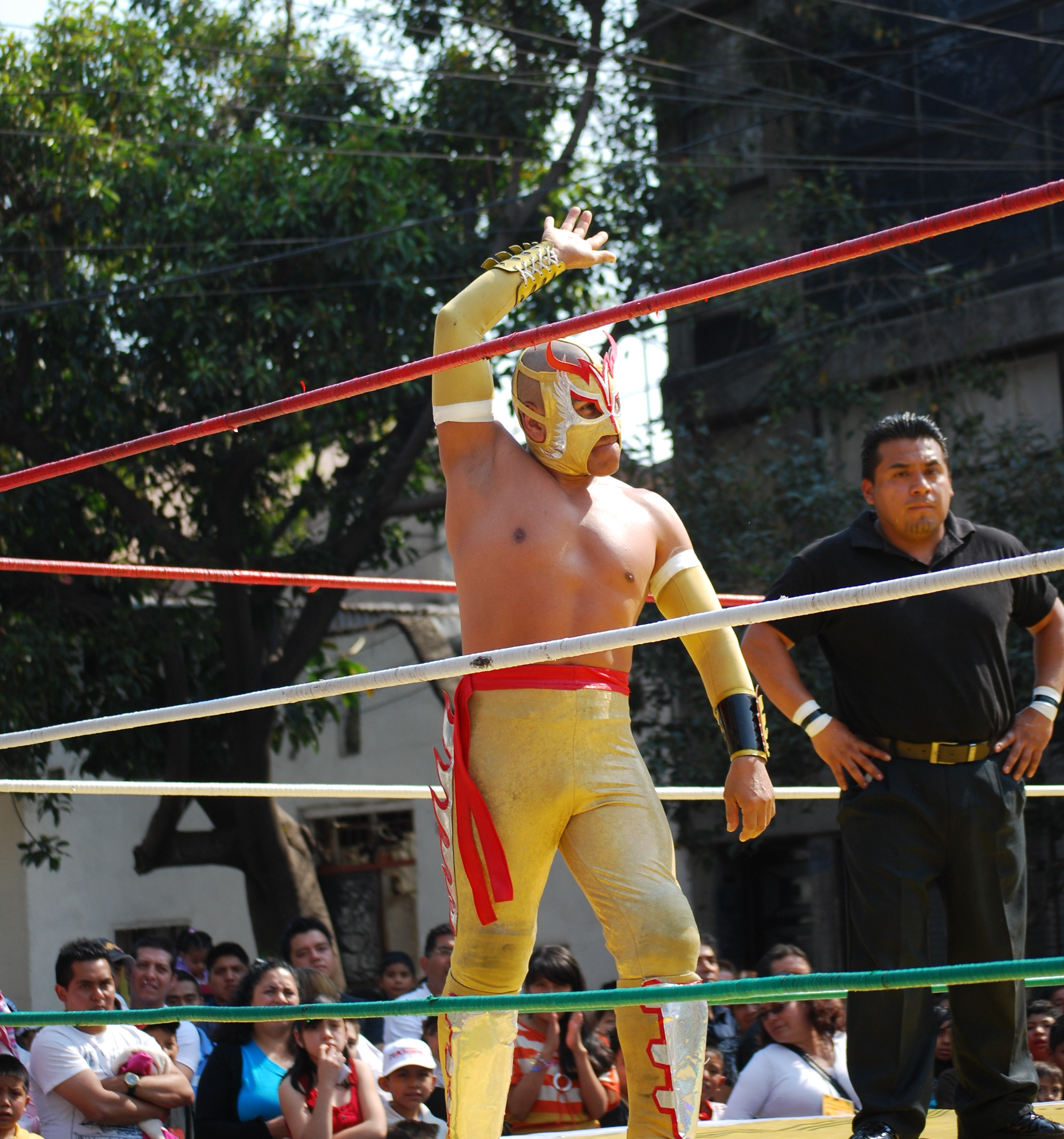
- Último Dragoncito, representing the Mini-Estrella division
- Promotion: Consejo Mundial de Lucha Libre
- Date: September 19, 1997
- City: Mexico City, Mexico
- Venue: Arena México

Event chronology
← Previous; 41. Aniversario de Arena México	Next → Juicio Final

CMLL Anniversary Shows chronology
← Previous; 63rd Anniversary	Next → 65th Anniversary

The CMLL 64th Anniversary Show (Spanish: 64. Aniversario de CMLL) was a professional wrestling major show event produced by Consejo Mundial de Lucha Libre (CMLL) that took place on September 19, 1997 in Arena México, Mexico City, Mexico. The event commemorated the 64th anniversary of CMLL, the oldest professional wrestling promotion. in the world. The Anniversary show is CMLL's biggest show of the year, their Super Bowl event. The CMLL Anniversary Show series is the longest-running annual professional wrestling show, starting in 1934. The CMLL Anniversary Show series is the longest-running annual professional wrestling show, starting in 1934.

The show consisted of six matches, with the main event being a Lucha de Apuestas, mask vs. hair match between Hijo del Santo, who put his mask on the line, against Negro Casas, who risked his hair. The show also featured three Six-man tag team matches, as well as two tag team matches, one featuring CMLL's Mini-Estrella division and one featuring CMLL's women's division.

== Production ==
=== Background ===
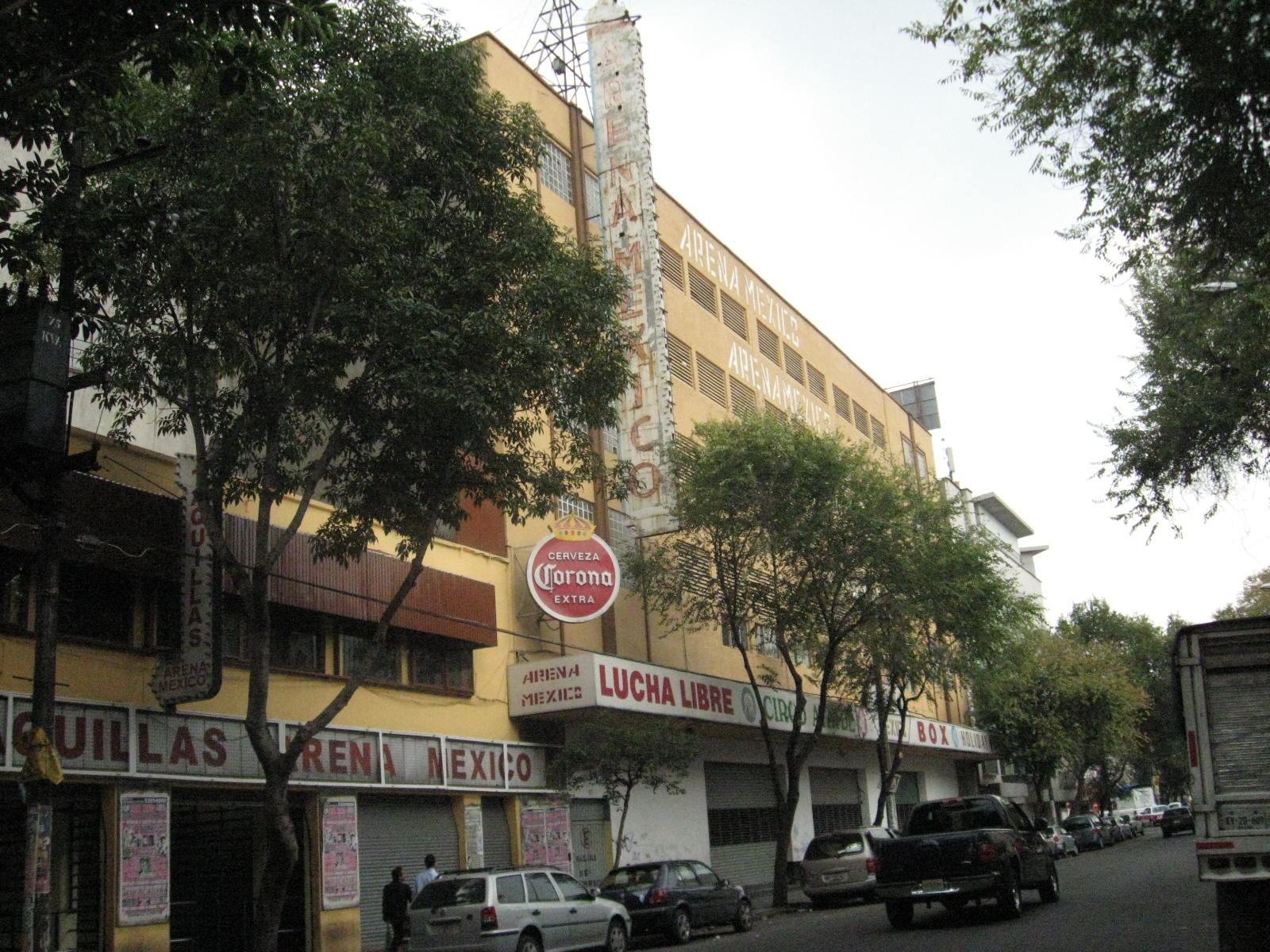
Arena México, CMLL's main venue and location of the Anniversary Show

The Mexican Lucha libre (professional wrestling) company Consejo Mundial de Lucha Libre (CMLL) started out under the name Empresa Mexicana de Lucha Libre ("Mexican Wrestling Company"; EMLL), founded by Salvador Lutteroth in 1933. Lutteroth, inspired by professional wrestling shows he had attended in Texas, decided to become a wrestling promoter and held his first show on September 21, 1933, marking what would be the beginning of organized professional wrestling in Mexico. Lutteroth would later become known as "the father of Lucha Libre" . A year later EMLL held the EMLL 1st Anniversary Show, starting the annual tradition of the Consejo Mundial de Lucha Libre Anniversary Shows that have been held each year ever since, most commonly in September.

Over the years the anniversary show would become the biggest show of the year for CMLL, akin to the Super Bowl for the National Football League (NFL) or WWE's WrestleMania event. The first anniversary show was held in Arena Modelo, which Lutteroth had bought after starting EMLL. In 1942–43 Lutteroth financed the construction of Arena Coliseo, which opened in April 1943. The EMLL 10th Anniversary Show was the first of the anniversary shows to be held in Arena Coliseo. In 1956 Lutteroth had Arena México built in the location of the original Arena Modelo, making Arena México the main venue of EMLL from that point on. Starting with the EMLL 23rd Anniversary Show, all anniversary shows except for the EMLL 46th Anniversary Show have been held in the arena that would become known as "The Cathedral of Lucha Libre". On occasion EMLL held more than one show labelled as their "Anniversary" show, such as two 33rd Anniversary Shows in 1966. Over time the anniversary show series became the oldest, longest-running annual professional wrestling show. In comparison, WWE's WrestleMania is only the fourth oldest still promoted show (CMLL's Arena Coliseo Anniversary Show and Arena México anniversary shows being second and third). EMLL was supposed to hold the EMLL 52nd Anniversary Show on September 20, 1985 but Mexico City was hit by a magnitude 8.0 earthquake. EMLL canceled the event both because of the general devastation but also over fears that Arena México might not be structurally sound after the earthquake.

When Jim Crockett Promotions was bought by Ted Turner in 1988 EMLL became the oldest still active promotion in the world. In 1991 EMLL was rebranded as "Consejo Mundial de Lucha Libre" and thus held the CMLL 59th Anniversary Show, the first under the new name, on September 18, 1992. Traditionally CMLL holds their major events on Friday Nights, replacing their regularly scheduled Super Viernes show.

=== Storylines ===
The event featured seven professional wrestling matches with different wrestlers involved in pre-existing scripted feuds, plots and storylines. Wrestlers were portrayed as either heels (referred to as rudos in Mexico, those that portray the "bad guys") or faces (técnicos in Mexico, the "good guy" characters) as they followed a series of tension-building events, which culminated in a wrestling match or series of matches.

== Results ==
No.	Results	Stipulations
1	Ultimo Dragoncito and Cicloncito Ramirez defeated Damiancito el Guerrero and Pierrothito	Best two-out-of-three falls Tag team match
2	Valentin Mayo, Halcón Negro and Karloff Lagarde Jr. defeated Olimpico, Tony Rivera and Ultraman Jr.	Best two-out-of-three falls six-man "Lucha Libre rules" tag team match
3	Emilio Charles Jr. defeated El Satánico, Mr. Niebla, Brazo de Plata, Scorpio Jr., Mascara Magica and Bestia Salvaje	Seven-man Torneo cibernetico elimination match
4	Lola Gonzalez and Lady Apache defeated Lioness Asuka and La Diabólica	Best two-out-of-three falls tag team match
5	Los Capos (Universo 2000, Máscara Año 2000 and Apolo Dantés) defeated Lizmark, Atlantis and El Fantasma	Best two-out-of-three falls six-man "Lucha Libre rules" tag team match
6	Rayo de Jalisco Jr. defeated Cien Caras by disqualification	Best two-out-of-three falls singles match
7	Hijo del Santo defeated Negro Casas	Lucha de Apuestas mask vs. hair match
