= Juicio Final (1999) =

Mexican professional wrestling event

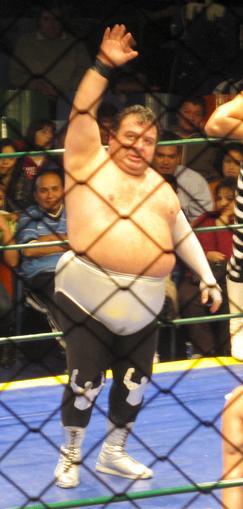
- Brazo de Plata, who lost to Pierroth Jr. in the main event and had his hair shaved off
- Promotion: Consejo Mundial de Lucha Libre
- Date: December 3, 1999
- City: Mexico City, Mexico
- Venue: Arena México

Event chronology
← Previous; Leyenda de Plata	Next → Copa de Arena Mexico

Juicio Final chronology
← Previous; 1998	Next → 2000

Juicio Final (1999) (Spanish for "Final Judgement" 1999) was a professional wrestling supercard show, scripted and produced by Consejo Mundial de Lucha Libre (CMLL), which took place on December 3, 1999, in Arena México, Mexico City, Mexico. The show served as the year-end finale for CMLL before Arena México, CMLL's main venue, closed down for the winter for renovations and to host Circo Atayde . The shows replaced the regular Super Viernes ("Super Friday") shows held by CMLL since the mid-1930s. This was the ninth year that CMLL used the name "Jucio Final" for their year-end show, a name they would use on a regular basis going forward, originally for their year even events but later on held at other points in the year.

The main event of the show was a Luchas de Apuestas, or bet match, which is considered a higher profile match type than a championship match in Lucha Libre. The match saw Pierroth Jr. defeating Brazo de Plata, thus forcing Brazo de Plata to be shaved bald as a result. In the semi-main event El Hijo del Santo defeated Scorpio Jr. to win the 1999 Leyenda de Plata tournament named after El Hijo del Santo's father El Santo. The match featured three more matches.

== Production ==
=== Background ===
For decades Arena México, the main venue of the Mexican professional wrestling promotion Consejo Mundial de Lucha Libre (CMLL), would close down in early December and remain closed into either January or February to allow for renovations as well as letting Circo Atayde occupy the space over the holidays. As a result, CMLL usually held a "end of the year" supercard show on the first or second Friday of December in lieu of their normal Super Viernes show. 1955 was the first year where CMLL used the name "El Juicio Final" ("The Final Judgement") for their year-end supershow. Until 2000 the Jucio Final name was always used for the year end show, but since 2000 has at times been used for shows outside of December. It is no longer an annually recurring show, but instead held intermittently sometimes several years apart and not always in the same month of the year either. All Juicio Final shows have been held in Arena México in Mexico City, Mexico which is CMLL's main venue, its "home".

=== Storylines ===
The 1992 Juicio Final show featured five professional wrestling matches scripted by CMLL with some wrestlers involved in scripted feuds. The wrestlers portray either heels (referred to as rudos in Mexico, those that play the part of the "bad guys") or faces (técnicos in Mexico, the "good guy" characters) as they perform.

The qualifying torneo cibernetico elimination match took place on November 26, 1999, and saw El Hijo del Santo outlast a field of 15 other wrestlers including Antifaz del Norte, Bestia Salvaje, BlacK warrior, Blue Panther, Emilio Charles Jr., El Felino, Fuerza Guerrera, Negro Casas, Olímpico, Rey Bucanero, Satánico, Tarzan Boy, Tony Rivera, Último Guerrero and Zumbido. El Hijo del Santo only eliminated one wrestler in the match, Último Guerrero to qualify for the final. Like in 1998 the 1999 Leyenda de Plata cibernetico winner went straight to the final, a rematch from the 1998 tournament, only this time El Hijo del Santo defeated Scorpio Jr. to win the tournament named after his father.

#	Eliminated	Eliminated by
1	Tony Rivera	Bestia Salvaje
2	Antifaz del Nortre	El Satánico
3	Bestia Salvaje	Tarzan Boy
4	Zumbido	Negro Casas
5	Rey Bucanero	Olímpico
6	Negro Casas	Fuerza Guerrera
7	El Felino	Emilio Charles Jr.
8	El Satánico	Blue Panther
9	Emilio Charles Jr.	Blue Panther
9	Blue Panther	Emilio Charles Jr.
11	Fuerza Guerrera	Olímpico
12	Olímpico	Tarzan Boy
13	Tarzan Boy	Black Warrior
14	Black Warrior	Último Guerrero
15	Último Guerrero	El Hijo del Santo
16	Winner	El Hijo del Santo

== Results ==
No.	Results	Stipulations
1	Ángel Azteca, El Pantera, and Tigre Blanco defeated Rencor Latino, Valentin Mayo, and Virus	Best two-out-of-three falls six-man tag team match
2	Los Guapos (Bestia Salvaje, Shocker, and Zumbido) defeated Emilio Charles Jr., Negro Casas, and Tarzan Boy by disqualification	Best two-out-of-three falls six-man tag team match
3	Rayo de Jalisco Jr., Gigante Silva, and Tinieblas Jr. defeated Los Capos (Apolo Dantés, Cien Caras, and Universo 2000) and Último Guerrero	Four vs. three, best two-out-of-three falls six-man tag team match
4	El Hijo del Santo defeated Scorpio Jr.	Best two-out-of-three falls Leyenda de Plata tournament final
5	Pierroth Jr. defeated Brazo de Plata	Best two-out-of-three falls Lucha de Apuestas, hair vs. hair match
