= CMLL 61st Anniversary Show =

CMLL 61st Anniversary show
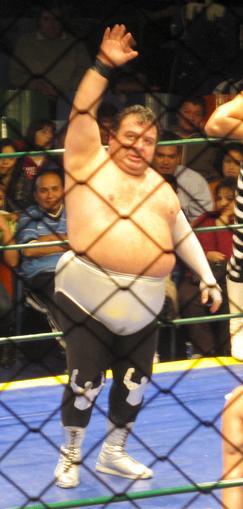
- Brazo de Plata, took part in the second match of the night against his brother
- Promotion: Consejo Mundial de Lucha Libre
- Date: September 30, 1994
- City: Mexico City, Mexico
- Venue: Arena México

Event chronology
← Previous; 38. Aniversario de Arena México	Next → Copa de Oro

CMLL Anniversary Shows chronology
← Previous; 60th Anniversary	Next → 62nd Anniversary

The CMLL 61st Anniversary Show (Spanish: 61. Aniversario de CMLL) was a pair of major professional wrestling events produced by Consejo Mundial de Lucha Libre (CMLL) that took place on September 23 and September 30, 1994 in Arena México, Mexico City, Mexico. The events commemorated the 61st anniversary of CMLL, the oldest professional wrestling promotion in the world. The Anniversary show is CMLL's biggest show of the year, their Super Bowl event. The CMLL Anniversary Show series is the longest-running annual professional wrestling show, starting in 1934.

The shows consisted of six and five matches respectively, with the ultimate main event being a Lucha de Apuestas, hair vs. hair match, between Ricky Santana and El Texano. Santana won the match, two falls to one, and thus El Texano had his hair shaved off. The shows featured additional Lucha de Apuestas between Silver King and Scorpio Sr. - where Silver King was victorious and Scorpio Sr. was left bald - and Negro Casas and Mocho Cota - won by Casas. The shows also featured multiple Six-man and tag team matches.

== Production ==
=== Background ===
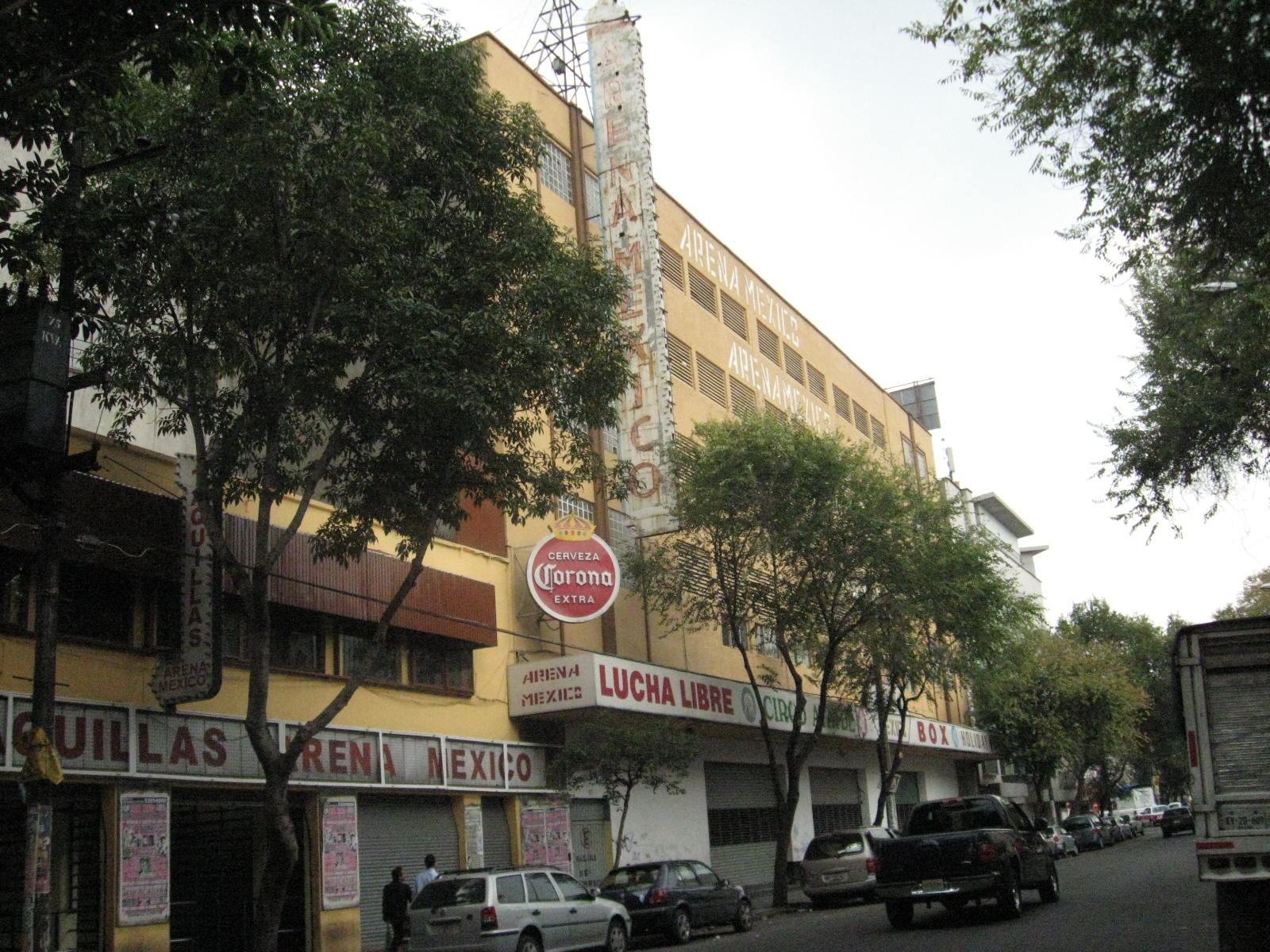
Arena México, CMLL's main venue and location of the Anniversary Show

The Mexican Lucha libre (professional wrestling) company Consejo Mundial de Lucha Libre (CMLL) started out under the name Empresa Mexicana de Lucha Libre ("Mexican Wrestling Company"; EMLL), founded by Salvador Lutteroth in 1933. Lutteroth, inspired by professional wrestling shows he had attended in Texas, decided to become a wrestling promoter and held his first show on September 21, 1933, marking what would be the beginning of organized professional wrestling in Mexico. Lutteroth would later become known as "the father of Lucha Libre" . A year later EMLL held the EMLL 1st Anniversary Show, starting the annual tradition of the Consejo Mundial de Lucha Libre Anniversary Shows that have been held each year ever since, most commonly in September.

Over the years the anniversary show would become the biggest show of the year for CMLL, akin to the Super Bowl for the National Football League (NFL) or WWE's WrestleMania event. The first anniversary show was held in Arena Modelo, which Lutteroth had bought after starting EMLL. In 1942–43 Lutteroth financed the construction of Arena Coliseo, which opened in April 1943. The EMLL 10th Anniversary Show was the first of the anniversary shows to be held in Arena Coliseo. In 1956 Lutteroth had Arena México built in the location of the original Arena Modelo, making Arena México the main venue of EMLL from that point on. Starting with the EMLL 23rd Anniversary Show, all anniversary shows except for the EMLL 46th Anniversary Show have been held in the arena that would become known as "The Cathedral of Lucha Libre". On occasion EMLL held more than one show labeled as their "Anniversary" show, such as two 33rd Anniversary Shows in 1966. Over time the anniversary show series became the oldest, longest-running annual professional wrestling show. In comparison, WWE's WrestleMania is only the fourth oldest still promoted show (CMLL's Arena Coliseo Anniversary Show and Arena México anniversary shows being second and third). EMLL was supposed to hold the EMLL 52nd Anniversary Show on September 20, 1985 but Mexico City was hit by a magnitude 8.0 earthquake. EMLL canceled the event both because of the general devastation but also over fears that Arena México might not be structurally sound after the earthquake.

When Jim Crockett Promotions was bought by Ted Turner in 1988 EMLL became the oldest still active promotion in the world. In 1991 EMLL was rebranded as "Consejo Mundial de Lucha Libre" and thus held the CMLL 59th Anniversary Show, the first under the new name, on September 18, 1992. Traditionally CMLL holds their major events on Friday Nights, replacing their regularly scheduled Super Viernes show.

=== Storylines ===
The event featured five professional wrestling matches with different wrestlers involved in pre-existing scripted feuds, plots and storylines. Wrestlers were portrayed as either heels (referred to as rudos in Mexico, those that portray the "bad guys") or faces (técnicos in Mexico, the "good guy" characters) as they followed a series of tension-building events, which culminated in a wrestling match or series of matches.

== Results ==
=== Week 1 ===
No.	Results	Stipulations	Times
1	Atlantico and Ludwig Star defeated Corazón Salvaje and Tarahumara	Best two-out-of-three falls Tag team match	—
2	El Felino, Gran Markus Jr. and Mano Negra defeated Brazo de Oro, Brazo de Plata and El Brazo	Best two-out-of-three falls six-man "Lucha Libre rules" tag team match	—
3	Américo Rocca, Atlantis and El Dandy defeated Javier Cruz, Kouki Kitahara and Pierroth Jr.	Best two-out-of-three falls six-man "Lucha Libre rules" tag team match	—
4	Ricky Santana and El Scorpió defeated Silver King and El Texano	Best two-out-of-three falls Tag team match	—
5	Bestia Salvaje, Emilio Charles Jr. and Satánico defeated Hayabusa, Masao Orihara and Último Dragón	Best two-out-of-three falls six-man "Lucha Libre rules" tag team match	—
6	Negro Casas defeated Mocho Cota	Best two-out-of-three falls Lucha de Apuestas, hair vs. hair match.	21:34

=== Week 2 ===
No.	Results	Stipulations
1	Shocker and El Bronco defeated Cerebro and Guerrero Imperial	Best two-out-of-three falls Tag team match
2	Apolo Dantés and Los Brazos (Brazo de Oro and Brazo de Plata) defeated El Brazo and The Headhunters (A and B)	Best two-out-of-three falls six-man "Lucha Libre rules" tag team match
3	Emilio Charles Jr. and Negro Casas defeated El Satánico and Miguel Perez, Jr.	Best two-out-of-three falls tag team match
4	Silver King defeated El Scorpió	Best two-out-of-three falls Lucha de Apuestas, hair vs. hair match.
5	Ricky Santana defeated El Texano	Best two-out-of-three falls Lucha de Apuestas, hair vs. hair match.
