= Juicio Final (1997) =

Mexican professional wrestling event

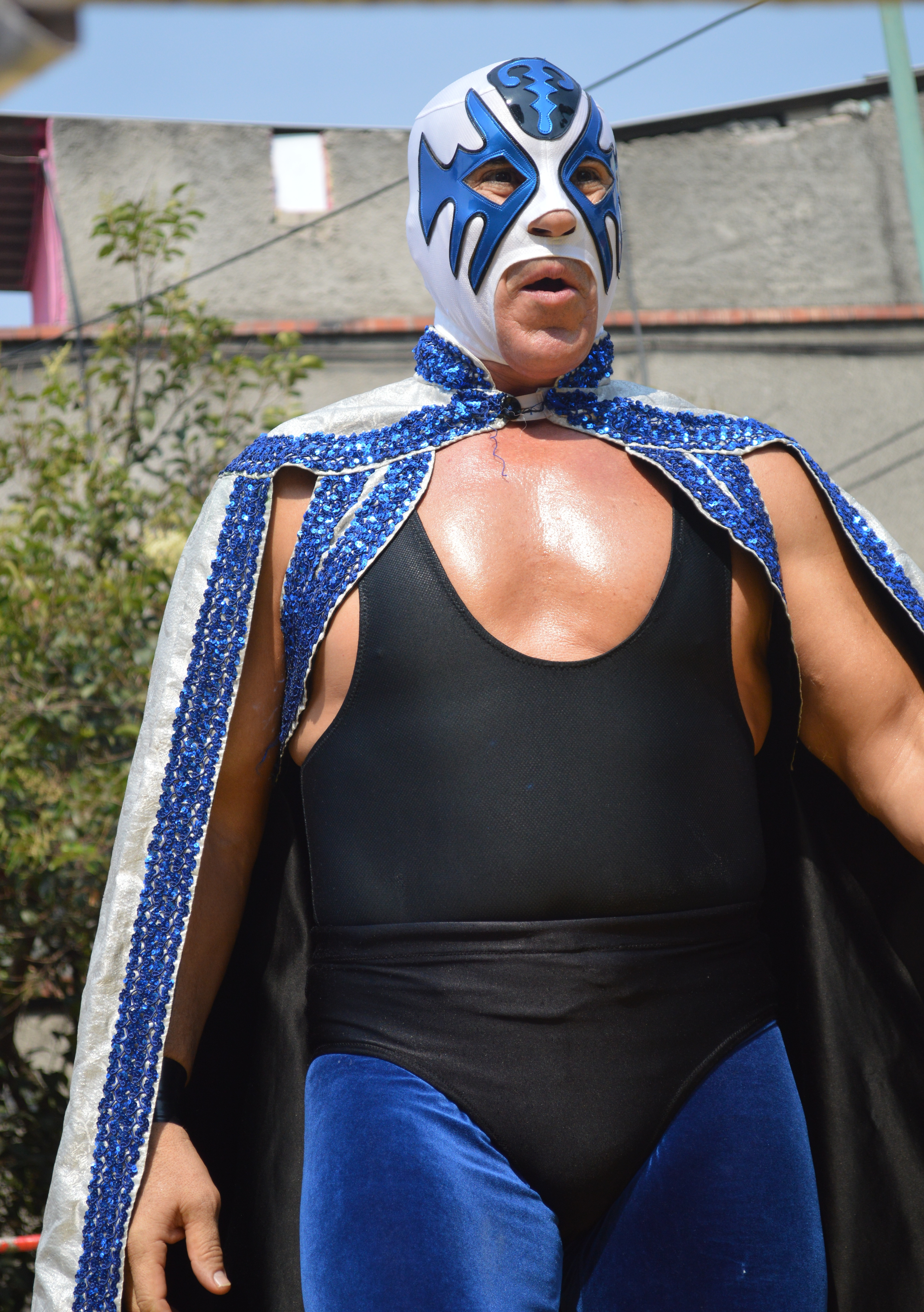
- Atlantis, winner of the month-long, 16-man La Copa Victoria tournament
- Promotion: Consejo Mundial de Lucha Libre
- Date: December 5, 1997
- City: Mexico City, Mexico
- Venue: Arena México

Event chronology
← Previous; CMLL 64th Anniversary Show	Next → Homenaje a Salvador Lutteroth

Juicio Final chronology
← Previous; 1996	Next → 1998

Juicio Final (1997) (Spanish for "Final Judgement" 1997) was a professional wrestling supercard show, scripted and produced by Consejo Mundial de Lucha Libre (CMLL), which took place on December 5, 1997, in Arena México, Mexico City, Mexico. The show served as the year-end finale for CMLL before Arena México, CMLL's main venue, closed down for the winter for renovations and to host Circo Atayde . The shows replaced the regular Super Viernes ("Super Friday") shows held by CMLL since the mid-1930s.

The main event of the show was the finals of a several weeks long La Copa Victoria tournament which saw Atlantis defeat Blue Panther two falls to one to win the tournament. On the undercard the team of Black Warrior and El Hijo del Santo defeated the team of Los Revolucionaries (El Felino and Negro Casas) as well as Scorpio Jr. and a partner. The show featured three additional matches.

== Production ==
=== Background ===
For decades Arena México, the main venue of the Mexican professional wrestling promotion Consejo Mundial de Lucha Libre (CMLL), would close down in early December and remain closed into either January or February to allow for renovations as well as letting Circo Atayde occupy the space over the holidays. As a result CMLL usually held a "end of the year" supercard show on the first or second Friday of December in lieu of their normal Super Viernes show. 1955 was the first year where CMLL used the name "El Juicio Final" ("The Final Judgement") for their year-end supershow. It is no longer an annually recurring show, but instead held intermittently sometimes several years apart and not always in the same month of the year either. All Juicio Final shows have been held in Arena México in Mexico City, Mexico which is CMLL's main venue, its "home".

=== Storylines ===
The 1997 Juicio Final show featured five professional wrestling matches scripted by CMLL with some wrestlers involved in scripted feuds. The wrestlers portray either heels (referred to as rudos in Mexico, those that play the part of the "bad guys") or faces (técnicos in Mexico, the "good guy" characters) as they perform.

The main event was the culmination of the La Copa Victoria tournament, a 16-man double-elimination tournament that started on October 31 and ran over five shows prior to the Juicio Final Show. The winners bracket was won by Blue Panther. while Atlantis overcame his first round loss to win the losers bracket.

=== La Copa Victoria winners brackets ===
Round of 16
Violencia	W
Shocker	Pin
Universo 2000	W
Atlantis	Pin
Blue Panther	W
Brazo de Plata	Pin
Mr. Niebla	W
Dr. Wagner Jr.	Pin
Lizmark	W
Máscara Año 2000	Pin
Apolo Dantés	W
El Fantasma	Pin
Tigre Blanco	W
Emilio Charles Jr.	Pin
Black Warrior	W
La Fiera	Pin

Quarterfinals
Violencia	W
Universo 2000	Pin
Blue Panther	W
Mr. Niebla	Pin
Lizmark	Pin
Apolo Dantés	W
Tigre Blanco	DQ
Black Warrior	W

Semifinals
Violencia	Pin
Blue Panter	W
Apolo Dantés	W
Black Warrior	Pin

Finals
Blue Panter	W
Apolo Dantés	Pin

=== La Copa Victoria winners brackets ===
Round of 32
Lost winner's bracket
Lost winner's bracket
Dr. Wagner Jr.	W
Brazo de Plata	Pin
Shocker	Pin
Atlantis	W
El Fantasma	W
Máscara Año 2000	Pin
La Fiera	Pin
Emilio Charles Jr.	W
Lost winner's bracket
Lost winner's bracket
Lost winner's bracket
Lost winner's bracket

Round of 16
Black Warrior	W
Tigre Blanco	Pin
Lost winner's bracket
Dr. Wagner Jr.	Pin
Atlantis	W
El Fantasma	Pin
Emilio Charles Jr.	W
Lizmark	W
Tigre Blanco	Pin
Mr. Niebla	W
Universo 2000	Forfeit

Quarterfinals
Black Warrior	W
Violencia	Pin
Lost winners bracket
Atlantis	W
Emilio Charles Jr.	Pin
Lizmark	Forfeit
Mr. Niebla	W

Semifinals
Black Warrior	W
Apolo Dantés	Pin
Atlantis	W
Mr. Niebla	Pin

Final
Black Warrior	Pin
Atlantis	W

== Results ==
No.	Results	Stipulations
1	Apolo Chino and El Oriental defeated Jeque and Rencor Latino	Tag team match
2	Brazo de Oro, El Hijo del Solitario, and Fray Tormenta defeated Guerrero del Futuro, Karloff Lagarde Jr., and Violencia	Best two-out-of-three falls six-man tag team match
3	Apolo Dantés, Dr. Wagner Jr., and Emilio Charles Jr. defeated El Fantasma, La Fiera, and Mr. Niebla	Best two-out-of-three falls six-man tag team match
4	Black Warrior and El Hijo del Santo defeated Scorpio Jr. and a partner, Los Revolucionaries (El Felino and Negro Casas)	Three-way tag team match
5	Atlantis defeated Blue Panther	La Copa Victoria tournament finals
