= CMLL 65th Anniversary Show =

Mexican Professional wrestling show

CMLL 65th Anniversary show
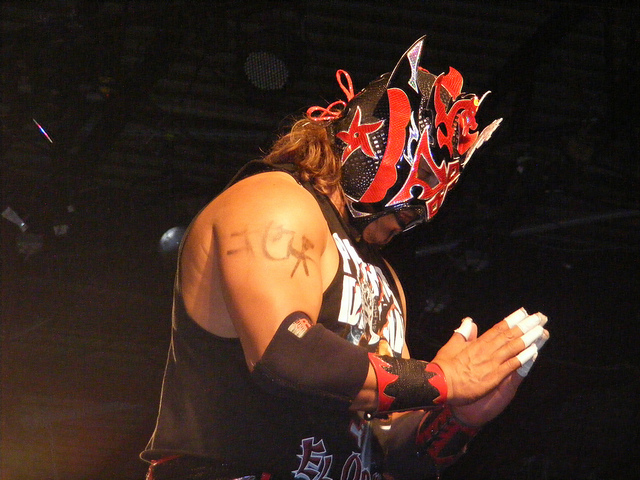
- El Oriental, worked in the opening match of the show
- Promotion: Consejo Mundial de Lucha Libre
- Date: September 11, 1998; September 18, 1998
- City: Mexico City, Mexico
- Venue: Arena México

Event chronology
← Previous; International Gran Prix	Next → Juicio Final

CMLL Anniversary Shows chronology
← Previous; 64th Anniversary	Next → 66th Anniversary

The CMLL 65th Anniversary Show (Spanish: 65. Aniversario de CMLL) was a professional wrestling major show event produced by Consejo Mundial de Lucha Libre (CMLL) in 1998. Different sources identify different shows in September as the actual Anniversary Show, either on September 11 or September 18, or possibly both as CMLL has held multiple shows to commemorate their anniversary in the past. Both shows took place in Arena Mexico in Mexico City, Mexico. The September 11th show consisted of five matches in total, with one of the featured bouts being a Best two-out-of-three falls Lucha de Apuesta mask vs. mask match between Último Guerrero and Mr. Águila, the first Luchas de Apuestas match of Último Guerrero's career.

The September 18th show consisted of five matches, with the main event being a Six-man tag team match between the teams of Los Capos (Cien Caras and Máscara Año 2000) and Emilio Charles Jr. taking on three representatives of CMLL's main rúd (bad guy) group Los Boriquas, Kevin Quinn, El Boricua and Miguel Perez, Jr. The semi-main event was a Lucha de Apuestas, hair vs. hair match between Ricky Santana and Apolo Dantés. In addition the show also featured an additional six-man tag match, an eight-man Atomicos match and a tag team match. One or both of the events commemorated the 65th anniversary of CMLL, the oldest professional wrestling promotion. in the world. The Anniversary show is CMLL's biggest show of the year, their Super Bowl event. The CMLL Anniversary Show series is the longest-running annual professional wrestling show, starting in 1934.

== Production ==
=== Background ===
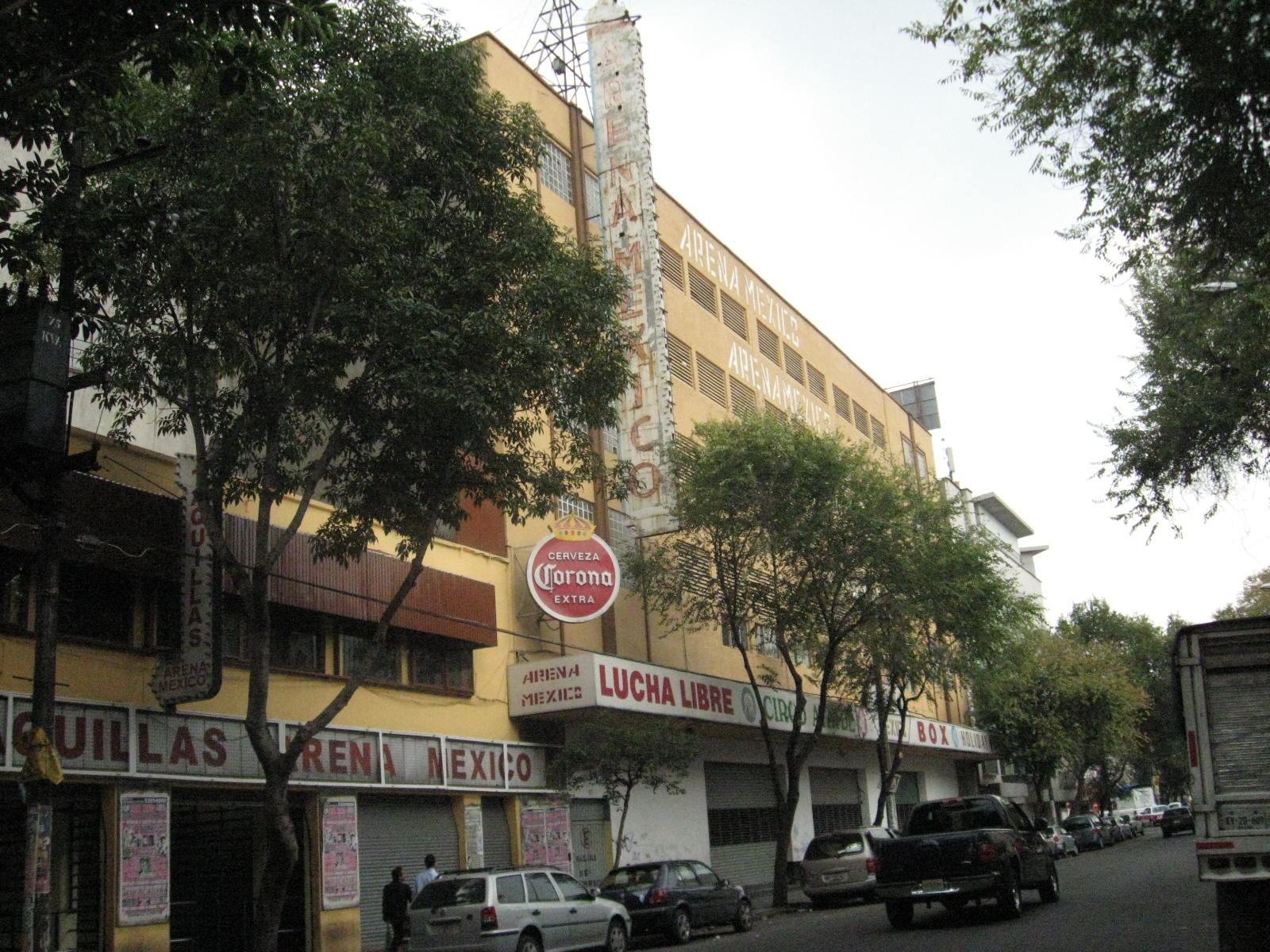
Arena México, CMLL's main venue and location of the Anniversary Show

The Mexican Lucha libre (professional wrestling) company Consejo Mundial de Lucha Libre (CMLL) started out under the name Empresa Mexicana de Lucha Libre ("Mexican Wrestling Company"; EMLL), founded by Salvador Lutteroth in 1933. Lutteroth, inspired by professional wrestling shows he had attended in Texas, decided to become a wrestling promoter and held his first show on September 21, 1933, marking what would be the beginning of organized professional wrestling in Mexico. Lutteroth would later become known as "the father of Lucha Libre". A year later EMLL held the EMLL 1st Anniversary Show, starting the annual tradition of the Consejo Mundial de Lucha Libre Anniversary Shows that have been held each year ever since, most commonly in September.

Over the years the anniversary show would become the biggest show of the year for CMLL, akin to the Super Bowl for the National Football League (NFL) or WWE's WrestleMania event. The first anniversary show was held in Arena Modelo, which Lutteroth had bought after starting EMLL. In 1942–43 Lutteroth financed the construction of Arena Coliseo, which opened in April 1943. The EMLL 10th Anniversary Show was the first of the anniversary shows to be held in Arena Coliseo. In 1956 Lutteroth had Arena México built in the location of the original Arena Modelo, making Arena México the main venue of EMLL from that point on. Starting with the EMLL 23rd Anniversary Show, all anniversary shows except for the EMLL 46th Anniversary Show have been held in the arena that would become known as "The Cathedral of Lucha Libre". On occasion EMLL held more than one show labeled as their "Anniversary" show, such as two 33rd Anniversary Shows in 1966. Over time the anniversary show series became the oldest, longest-running annual professional wrestling show. In comparison, WWE's WrestleMania is only the fourth oldest still promoted show (CMLL's Arena Coliseo Anniversary Show and Arena México anniversary shows being second and third). EMLL was supposed to hold the EMLL 52nd Anniversary Show on September 20, 1985, but Mexico City was hit by a magnitude 8.0 earthquake. EMLL canceled the event both because of the general devastation but also over fears that Arena México might not be structurally sound after the earthquake.

When Jim Crockett Promotions was bought by Ted Turner in 1988 EMLL became the oldest still active promotion in the world. In 1991 EMLL was rebranded as "Consejo Mundial de Lucha Libre" and thus held the CMLL 59th Anniversary Show, the first under the new name, on September 18, 1992. Traditionally CMLL holds their major events on Friday Nights, replacing their regularly scheduled Super Viernes show.

=== Storylines ===
Both shows featured a number of professional wrestling matches with different wrestlers involved in pre-existing scripted feuds, plots and storylines. Wrestlers were portrayed as either heels (referred to as rudos in Mexico, those that portray the "bad guys") or faces (técnicos in Mexico, the "good guy" characters) as they followed a series of tension-building events, which culminated in a wrestling match or series of matches.

== Results September 11, 1998 ==
No.	Results	Stipulations
1	El Hijo del Solitario and Ultraman Jr. defeated Valentin Mayo and Zumbido	Best two-out-of-three falls Tag team match
2	Los Hermanos Dinamita (Cien Caras, Máscara Año 2000 and Universo 2000) defeated Ringo Mendoza and The Headhunters (Headhunter A and Headhunter B)	Best two-out-of-three falls six-man "Lucha Libre rules" tag team match
3	Apolo Dantés, Emilio Charles Jr. and Máscara Año 2000 defeated El Boricua, Kevin Quinn and Ricky Santana by disqualification	Best two-out-of-three falls six-man "Lucha Libre rules" tag team match
4	Último Guerrero defeated Mr. Águila	Best two-out-of-three falls Lucha de Apuestas mask vs. mask match
5	Atlantis, La Fiera and Negro Casas defeated El Hijo del Santo, Fuerza Guerrera and Villano III by disqualification	Best two-out-of-three falls six-man "Lucha Libre rules" tag team match

== Results September 18, 1998 ==
No.	Results	Stipulations
1	Virus and Halcon Negro Jr. defeated Sendero and El Oriental	Best two-out-of-three falls Tag team match
2	Steele, Universo 2000 and Dr. Wagner Jr. defeated Rayo de Jalisco Jr. and The Headhunters (A and B)	Best two-out-of-three falls six-man "Lucha Libre rules" tag team match
3	Hijo del Santo, Atlantis, La Fiera and Negro Casas defeated Fuerza Guerrera, Villano III, Scorpio Jr. and Bestia Salvaje	Best two-out-of-three falls eight-man Atómicos tag team match
4	Ricky Santana defeated Apolo Dantés	Best two-out-of-three falls Lucha de Apuestas, hair vs. hair match
5	Los Hermanos Dinamita (Cien Caras and Máscara Año 2000) and Emilio Charles Jr. defeated Los Boricuas (Kevin Quinn, La Boricua and Miguel Perez, Jr.)	Best two-out-of-three falls six-man "Lucha Libre rules" tag team match
