= Juicio Final (1998) =

Mexican professional wrestling event

- Promotion: Consejo Mundial de Lucha Libre
- Date: December 18, 1998
- City: Mexico City, Mexico
- Venue: Arena México

Event chronology
← Previous; CMLL 65th Anniversary Show	Next → Homenaje a Dos Leyendas

Juicio Final chronology
← Previous; 1997	Next → 1999

Juicio Final (1998) (Spanish for "Final Judgement" 1998) was a professional wrestling supercard show, scripted and produced by Consejo Mundial de Lucha Libre (CMLL), which took place on December 18, 1998, in Arena México, Mexico City, Mexico. The show served as the year-end finale for CMLL before Arena México, CMLL's main venue, closed down for the winter for renovations and to host Circo Atayde . The shows replaced the regular Super Viernes ("Super Friday") shows held by CMLL since the mid-1930s.

The main event of the show was the finals of a three week long tournament for the vacant CMLL World Trios Championship. In the end the team of Black Warrior, Blue Panther and Dr. Wagner Jr. defeated Los Guapos (Bestia Salvaje), Scorpio Jr. and Zumbido to win the championship. The show featured five additional matches.

== Production ==
=== Background ===
For decades Arena México, the main venue of the Mexican professional wrestling promotion Consejo Mundial de Lucha Libre (CMLL), would close down in early December and remain closed into either January or February to allow for renovations as well as letting Circo Atayde occupy the space over the holidays. As a result CMLL usually held a "end of the year" supercard show on the first or second Friday of December in lieu of their normal Super Viernes show. 1955 was the first year where CMLL used the name "El Juicio Final" ("The Final Judgement") for their year-end supershow. Until 2000 the Jucio Final name was always used for the year end show, but since 2000 has at times been used for shows outside of December. It is no longer an annually recurring show, but instead held intermittently sometimes several years apart and not always in the same month of the year either. All Juicio Final shows have been held in Arena México in Mexico City, Mexico which is CMLL's main venue, its "home".

=== Storylines ===
The 1998 Juicio Final show featured five professional wrestling matches scripted by CMLL with some wrestlers involved in scripted feuds. The wrestlers portray either heels (referred to as rudos in Mexico, those that play the part of the "bad guys") or faces (técnicos in Mexico, the "good guy" characters) as they perform.

In October 1998, Mr. Niebla suffered an injury, which forced CMLL to vacate the CMLL World Trios Championship as it was not clear when Mr. Niebla would be able to wrestle again. They held a three-show, eight-team tournament from December 4 to December 12, 1998. Former champions Atlantis and Lizmark teamed up with Emilio Charles Jr. for the tournament, while Mr. Niebla actually returned to action in time to be in the tournament as well, teaming up with Rayo de Jalisco Jr. and Shocker. In the finals the trio of Dr. Wagner Jr., Blue Panther and Black Warrior defeated Los Guapos (Scorpio Jr., Bestia Salvaje and Zumbido) to lay claim to the championship.

Tournament brackets

Quarterfinals
Gran Markus Jr., Fuerza Guerrera and Apolo Dantés
El Dandy, Vampiro and Héctor Garza	W
Los Guapos (Scorpio Jr., Bestia Salvaje and Zumbido)	W
Rayo de Jalisco Jr., Mr. Niebla and Shocker
Dr. Wagner Jr., Blue Panther and Black Warrior	W
Atlantis, Lizmark and Emilio Charles Jr.
El Felino, Negro Casas and El Hijo del Santo	W
Silver King and Los Villanos (Villano III and Villano V)

Semifinals
El Dandy, Vampiro and Héctor Garza
Los Guapos	W
Dr. Wagner Jr., Blue Panther and Black Warrior	W
El Felino, Negro Casas and El Hijo del Santo

Finals
Los Guapos
Dr. Wagner Jr., Blue Panther and Black Warrior	W

== Results ==
No.	Results	Stipulations
1	Bracito de Oro and Cicloncito Ramirez defeated Espectrito and Tritoncito	tag team match
2	Máscara Mágica, El Solar, and Super Kendo defeated Karloff Lagarde Jr., Mano Negra, and Shu El Guerrero	Best two-out-of-three falls six-man tag team match
3	Rayo de Jalisco Jr., Solomon Grundy, and Tinieblas Jr. defeated Los Hermanos Dinamita (Cien Caras, Máscara Año 2000, and Universo 2000) by disqualification	Best two-out-of-three falls six-man tag team match
4	El Hijo del Santo, El Felino, and Negro Casas defeated Silver King and Los Villanos (Villano III, and Villano V)	Best two-out-of-three falls six-man tag team match
5	Black Warrior, Blue Panther and Dr. Wagner Jr. defeated Los Guapos (Bestia Salvaje, Scorpio Jr. and Zumbido	Tournament final for the vacant CMLL World Trios Championship
