= CMLL 63rd Anniversary Show =

Mexican Professional wrestling show

CMLL 63rd Anniversary show
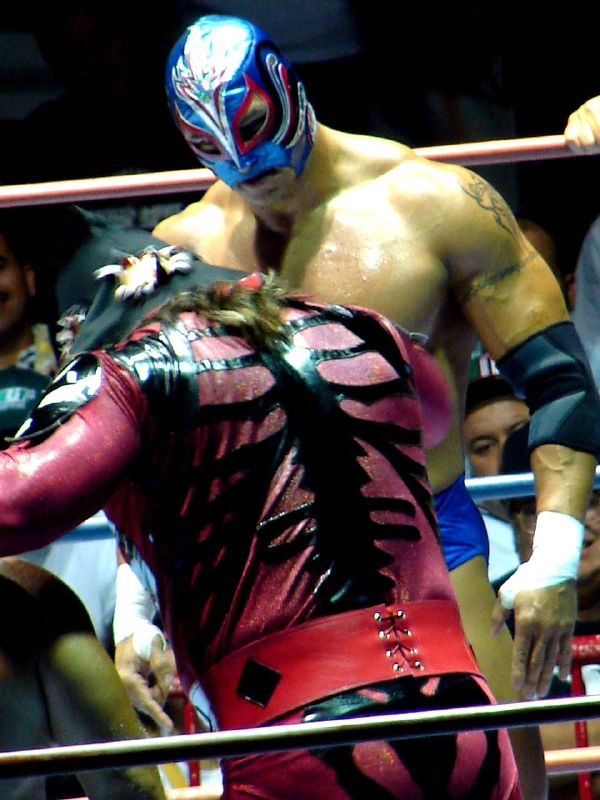
- Olímpico (in blue), teamed with the father/son team of Lizmark and Lizmark Jr.
- Promotion: Consejo Mundial de Lucha Libre
- Date: September 20, 1996; September 27, 1996
- City: Mexico City, Mexico
- Venue: Arena México
- Attendance: 10,500 (September 20)

Event chronology
← Previous; International Gran Prix	Next → Torneo Gran Alternativa

CMLL Anniversary Shows chronology
← Previous; 62nd Anniversary	Next → 64th Anniversary

The CMLL 63rd Anniversary Show (Spanish: 63. Aniversario de CMLL) was a professional wrestling major show event produced by Consejo Mundial de Lucha Libre (CMLL) in 1996. Different sources identify different shows in September as the actual Anniversary Show, either on September 20 or September 27, or possibly both as CMLL has held multiple shows to commemorate their anniversary in the past. Both shows took place in Arena Méxicoin Mexico City, Mexico. One or both events commemorated the 63rd anniversary of CMLL, the oldest professional wrestling promotion in the world. The Anniversary show is CMLL's biggest show of the year, their Super Bowl event. The CMLL Anniversary Show series is the longest-running annual professional wrestling show, starting in 1934.

The September 20th show consisted of five matches, with the main event seeing Rayo de Jalisco Jr. defend the CMLL World Heavyweight Championship against challenger Gran Markus Jr. On the undercard El Hijo del Santo and Negro Casas faced off in a singles match, working a storyline that a year later, at the CMLL 64th Anniversary Show saw them wrestle in a Lucha de Apuestas, hair vs. mask match. Also on the show Lola Gonzales defended the TWF Women's Championship against Lioness Asuka as well as three further matches. The September 27th show consisted of at least four matches, with the main event being a Best two-out-of-three fallsLucha de Apuesta hair vs. hair match between rivals Emilio Charles Jr. and Silver King.

== Production ==
=== Background ===
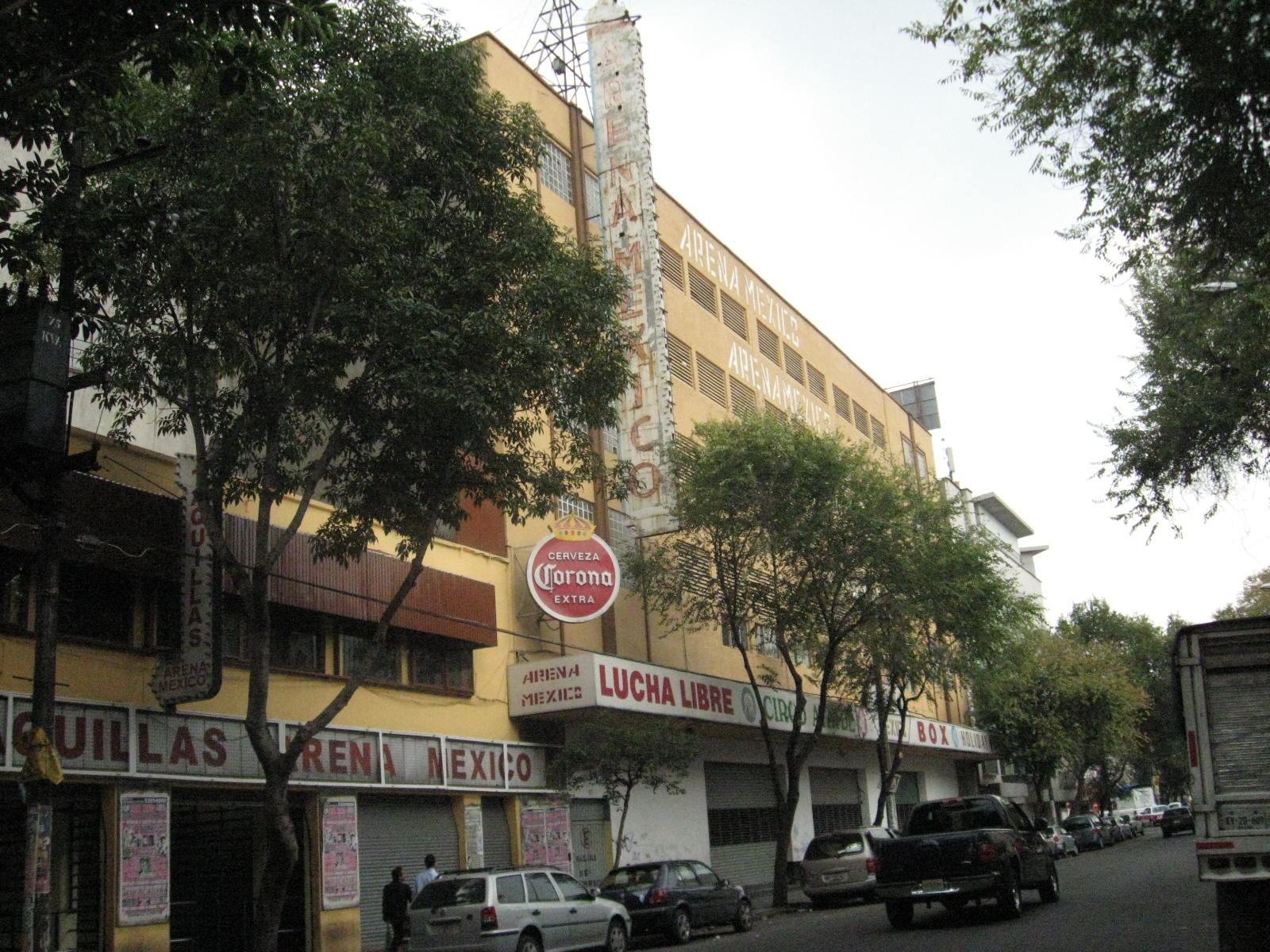
Arena México, CMLL's main venue and location of the Anniversary Show

The Mexican Lucha libre (professional wrestling) company Consejo Mundial de Lucha Libre (CMLL) started out under the name Empresa Mexicana de Lucha Libre ("Mexican Wrestling Company"; EMLL), founded by Salvador Lutteroth in 1933. Lutteroth, inspired by professional wrestling shows he had attended in Texas, decided to become a wrestling promoter and held his first show on September 21, 1933, marking what would be the beginning of organized professional wrestling in Mexico. Lutteroth would later become known as "the father of Lucha Libre" . A year later EMLL held the EMLL 1st Anniversary Show, starting the annual tradition of the Consejo Mundial de Lucha Libre Anniversary Shows that have been held each year ever since, most commonly in September.

Over the years the anniversary show would become the biggest show of the year for CMLL, akin to the Super Bowl for the National Football League (NFL) or WWE's WrestleMania event. The first anniversary show was held in Arena Modelo, which Lutteroth had bought after starting EMLL. In 1942–43 Lutteroth financed the construction of Arena Coliseo, which opened in April 1943. The EMLL 10th Anniversary Show was the first of the anniversary shows to be held in Arena Coliseo. In 1956 Lutteroth had Arena México built in the location of the original Arena Modelo, making Arena México the main venue of EMLL from that point on. Starting with the EMLL 23rd Anniversary Show, all anniversary shows except for the EMLL 46th Anniversary Show have been held in the arena that would become known as "The Cathedral of Lucha Libre". On occasion EMLL held more than one show labeled as their "Anniversary" show, such as two 33rd Anniversary Shows in 1966. Over time the anniversary show series became the oldest, longest-running annual professional wrestling show. In comparison, WWE's WrestleMania is only the fourth oldest still promoted show (CMLL's Arena Coliseo Anniversary Show and Arena México anniversary shows being second and third). EMLL was supposed to hold the EMLL 52nd Anniversary Show on September 20, 1985 but Mexico City was hit by a magnitude 8.0 earthquake. EMLL canceled the event both because of the general devastation but also over fears that Arena México might not be structurally sound after the earthquake.

When Jim Crockett Promotions was bought by Ted Turner in 1988 EMLL became the oldest still active promotion in the world. In 1991 EMLL was rebranded as "Consejo Mundial de Lucha Libre" and thus held the CMLL 59th Anniversary Show, the first under the new name, on September 18, 1992. Traditionally CMLL holds their major events on Friday Nights, replacing their regularly scheduled Super Viernes show.

=== Storylines ===
Both shows featured a number of professional wrestling matches with different wrestlers involved in pre-existing scripted feuds, plots and storylines. Wrestlers were portrayed as either heels (referred to as rudos in Mexico, those that portray the "bad guys") or faces (técnicos in Mexico, the "good guy" characters) as they followed a series of tension-building events, which culminated in a wrestling match or series of matches.

== Results September 20, 1996 ==
No.	Results	Stipulations
1	Escudero Rojo and Reyes Veloz defeated Filoso and Olímpico	Tag team match
2	Lioness Asuka defeated Lola Gonzales (C)	Singles match for the TWF Women's Championship
3	Lizmark, Lizmark Jr. and Olímpico defeated El Satánico, Scorpio Jr. and Bestia Salvaje	Best two-out-of-three falls six-man "Lucha Libre rules" tag team match
4	Dos Caras, Silver King and Atlantis defeated Miguel Perez, Jr., Emilio Charles Jr. and El Canek	Best two-out-of-three falls six-man "Lucha Libre rules" tag team match
5	Negro Casas defeated Hijo del Santo	Best two-out-of-three falls singles match
6	Rayo de Jalisco Jr. (C) defeated Gran Markus Jr.	Best two-out-of-three falls match for the CMLL World Heavyweight Championship

== Results September 27, 1996 ==
No.	Results	Stipulations
1	El Felino, Karloff Lagarde Jr. and Scorpio Jr. defeated La Fiera, Máscara Mágica and Ringo Mendoza	Best two-out-of-three falls six-man "Lucha Libre rules" tag team match
2	Rayo de Jalisco Jr., Lizmark and Negro Casas defeated Apolo Dantés, Bestia Salvaje and El Satánico	Best two-out-of-three falls six-man "Lucha Libre rules" tag team match
3	Canek (c) defeated Miguel Perez, Jr.	Best two-out-of-three falls match for the UWA World Heavyweight Championship
4	Emilio Charles Jr. defeated Silver King	Best two-out-of-three falls Lucha de Apuestas hair vs. hair match
(c) / – the champion(s) heading into the match
