= List of CMLL tag team tournaments =

Consejo Mundial de Lucha Libre tournaments

The Mexican professional wrestling promotion Consejo Mundial de Lucha Libre (CMLL) has held a number of tournaments tag team or their "Trios" (three man teams) divisions over the years. Some of the tournaments were recurring, but have not been held in the last two to three years and others were one-off tournament held for a special event. Being professional wrestling tournaments, they are not won legitimately through competitive matches; instead they are won via predetermined outcomes to the matches that is generally kept secret from the general public.

== Copa de Arena Mexico ==
CMLL held three tournaments under the name Copa de Arena Mexico, named after their main venue Arena Mexico, where all the tournaments also took place. The tournament was held in 1999, 2001 and 2002.

Copa de Arena Mexico winners

| Year | Winner | Date | Note |
|---|---|---|---|
| 1999 | "Los Guerreros del Infierno"; El Satánico, Rey Bucanero and Último Guerrero | December 10, 1999 | |
| 2001 | "Team Shocker"; Black Warrior, Shocker, and Apolo Dantés | December 28, 2001 | |
| 2002 | "Team Tall"; Black Warrior, Lizmark Jr., and Rayo de Jalisco Jr. | July 5, 2002 | |

=== Copa de Arena Mexico 1999 ===
Copa de Area Mexico (1999)
- Promotion: Consejo Mundial de Lucha Libre
- Date: December 10, 1999
- City: Mexico City, Mexico
- Venue: Arena Mexico

Event chronology
| ← Previous; Juicio Final | Next → Torneo Gran Alternativa |

Copa de Arena Mexico chronology
| ← Previous; First | Next → 2001 |

The first Copa de Arena Mexico tournament was a one night, four team single-elimination tournament was held on December 10, 1999, and was also called Torneo Siglo XXI ("21st Century Tournament"). The tournament was won by "Los Guerreros del Infierno" (El Satánico, Rey Bucanero and Último Guerrero), a team name that Bucanero and Guerrero would later use when they split from El Satánico to form their own faction. The winners were given a trophy but no other tangible award was given as a result of the victory. The tournament included four teams who all teamed on a regular basis both before and after the tournament.

Tournament Participants

- "Los Guapos": Bestia Salvaje, Scorpio Jr. and Shocker
- "Los Guerreros del Infierno": El Satánico, Rey Bucanero and Último Guerrero (Tournament winners)
- "Team Casas": Negro Casas, El Felino and Antifaz del Norte
- "Team Emilio": Emilio Charles Jr., Mr. Niebla and Tarzan Boy

Tournament brackets

Semifinals
1 | Team Casas
4 | Los Guerreros del Infierno | W
3 | Los Guapos
2 | Team Emilio | W

Finals
Los Guerreros del Infierno | W
Team Emilio

=== Copa de Arena Mexico 2001 ===
Copa de Arena Mexico (2001)
- Promotion: Consejo Mundial de Lucha Libre
- Date: December 28, 2001
- City: Mexico City, Mexico
- Venue: Arena Mexico

Event chronology
| ← Previous; Sin Piedad | Next → Homenaje a Dos Leyendas |

Copa de Arena Mexico chronology
| ← Previous; 1999 | Next → 2002 |

The second Copa de Arena Mexico tournament was once again a one night single-elimination tournament, this time with eight teams instead of four. The tournament was held on December 28, 2001, and was won by "Team Shocker" (Black Warrior, Shocker, and Apolo Dantés). The winners were given a trophy but no other tangible award was given as a result of the victory. Some of the teams in the tournament worked together on a regular basis, others were created for the tournament.

Tournament Participants

- Team Boricua: Gran Markus Jr., The Killer, Bestia Salvaje
- Team Brazo: Brazo de Plata, Brazo de Oro and Brazo de Platino
- Team Casas: Negro Casas, El Felino and La Fiera
- Team Demon: Blue Demon Jr., Mr. Niebla and Starman
- Team Guerreros del Infierno: Black Tiger, Rey Bucanero and Máscara Mágica
- Team Infernal: El Satánico, Averno and Mephisto
- Team Shocker: Shocker, Apolo Dantés and Black Warrior
- Team Villano: Villano III, Villano IV and Villano V

Tournament brackets

Quarterfinals
1 | Team Casas
8 | Team Guerreros del Infierno | W
4 | Team Demon
5 | Team Shocker | W
2 | Team Boricuas
7 | Team Brazos | W
3 | Team Infernal
6 | Team Villano | W

Semifinals
Team Guerreros del Infierno
Team Shocker | W
Team Brazos | W
Team Villano

Finals
Team Brazos
Team Shocker | W

=== Copa de Arena Mexico 2002 ===
Copa de Arena Mexico (2002)
- Promotion: Consejo Mundial de Lucha Libre
- Date: July 5, 2002
- City: Mexico City, Mexico
- Venue: Arena Mexico

Event chronology
| ← Previous; 46. Aniversario de Arena México | Next → Leyenda de Plata |

Copa de Arena Mexico chronology
| ← Previous; 2001 | Next → Last |

The third and last Copa de Arena Mexico tournament was a one night eight team single-elimination tournament, held on July 5, 2002, and was won by "Team Tall" (Black Warrior, Lizmark Jr., and Rayo de Jalisco Jr.). The win made Black Warrior the only wrestler to win the tournament more than once. The winners were given a trophy but no other tangible award was given as a result of the victory. Some of the teams in the tournament worked together on a regular basis, others were created for the tournament. Team Giant only consisted of two members, Giant Silva and Mr. Niebla, due to the size of Giant Silva CMLL counted him as two wrestlers for this tournament and most of the matches he participated in.

Tournament Participants

- Team Giant: Giganté Silva and Mr. Niebla
- Team Infernal: El Satánico, Averno and Mephisto
- Team Japan: Black Tiger, Masada and Nosawa
- Team Mexico: Gran Markus Jr., Poder Mexica and Mr. Mexico
- Team Shocker: Shocker, Máscara Mágica and Apolo Dantés
- Team Taliban: Emilio Charles Jr., Scorpio Jr. and Bestia Salvaje
- Team Tall: Rayo de Jalisco Jr., Black Warrior and Lizmark Jr.
- Team Villano: Villano III, Villano IV and Villano V

Tournament brackets

Quarterfinals
1 | Team Mexico
8 | Team Japan | W
4 | Team Infernal
5 | Team Villano | W
2 | Team Giant
7 | Team Shocker | W
3 | Team Infernal
6 | Team Villano | W

Semifinals
Team Tall | W
Team Taliban
Team Shocker
Team Tall | W

Finals
Team Japan
Team Tall | W

== Copa de Oro 1994 ==
Copa de Oro (1994)
- Promotion: Consejo Mundial de Lucha Libre
- Date: October 25, 1994
- City: Mexico City, Mexico
- Venue: Arena Coliseo

Event chronology
| ← Previous; CMLL 61st Anniversary Show | Next → Juicio Final |

Copa de Oro chronology
| ← Previous; First | Next → 1995 |

On October 26, 1993 Consejo Mundial de Lucha Libre (CMLL) wrestler Oro died as a direct result of a match at Arena Coliseo. The following year, on September 25, 1994, CMLL held a tag team tournament in Arena Coliseo to commemorate the loss of the popular wrestler and honor his memory. The tournament winners were presented with a trophy by Oro II, the original Oro's brother who had taken the name out of respect. The tournament was an eight-team single elimination tournament won by Apolo Dantés and El Dandy.

Tournament participants

- Apolo Dantés and El Dandy
- Brazo de Oro and Brazo de Plata
- Dr. Wagner Jr. and Gran Markus Jr.
- Hayabusa and Último Dragón
- Javier Cruz and Cachorro Mendoza
- La Fiera and Ringo Mendoza
- Negro Casas and Emilio Charles Jr.
- Pierroth Jr. and El Satánico

Tournament brackets

Quarterfinals
1 | Apolo Dantés and El Dandy | W
8 | Hayabusa and Último Dragón
4 | Javier Cruz and Cachorro Mendoza | W
5 | Negro Casas and Emilio Charles Jr.
2 | Pierroth Jr. and El Satánico | W
7 | Brazo de Oro and Brazo de Plata
3 | La Fiera and Ringo Mendoza | W
6 | Dr. Wagner Jr. and Gran Markus Jr.

Semifinals
Apolo Dantés and El Dandy | W
Negro Casas and Emilio Charles Jr.
Pierroth Jr. and El Satánico | W
La Fiera and Ringo Mendoza

Finals
Apolo Dantés and El Dandy | W
Pierroth Jr. and El Satánico

== Copa de Oro 1995 ==
Copa de Oro (1995)
- Promotion: Consejo Mundial de Lucha Libre
- Date: October 26, 1995
- City: Mexico City, Mexico
- Venue: Arena Coliseo

Event chronology
| ← Previous; CMLL 62nd Anniversary Show | Next → Juicio Final |

Copa de Oro chronology
| ← Previous; 1994 | Next → Last |

On October 26, 1993 Consejo Mundial de Lucha Libre (CMLL) wrestler Oro died as a direct result of a match at Arena Coliseo. CMLL held Copa de Oro one year later in 1994 and followed it with a second Copa de Oro in 1995 on October 24. The tournament winners were presented with a trophy by Oro II, the original Oro's brother who had taken the name out of respect. The tournament was an eight-team single elimination tournament won by Chicago Express and Pierroth Jr.

Tournament participants

- Américo Rocca and Javier Cruz
- Bestia Salvaje and Sangre Chicana
- Blue Demon Jr. and Silver King
- Brazo de Oro and El Brazo
- Chicago Express and Pierroth Jr.
- Emilio Charles Jr. and El Felino
- Gran Markus Jr. and Hijo del Gladiador
- Máscara Mágica and Ringo Mendoza

Tournament brackets

Quarterfinals
1 | Máscara Mágica and Ringo Mendoza | W
8 | Bestia Salvaje and Sangre Chicana
4 | Blue Demon Jr. and Silver King
5 | Emilio Charles Jr. and El Felino | W
2 | Brazo de Oro and El Brazo | W
7 | Gran Markus Jr. and Hijo del Gladiador
3 | Chicago Express and Pierroth Jr. | W
6 | Américo Rocca and Javier Cruz

Semifinals
Máscara Mágica and Ringo Mendoza | W
Emilio Charles Jr. and El Felino
Chicago Express and Pierroth Jr. | W
Brazo de Oro and El Brazo

Finals
Máscara Mágica and Ringo Mendoza
Chicago Express and Pierroth Jr. | W

== CMLL Second Generation Tag Team Tournament ==
Second Generation Tag Team Tournament
- Promotion: Consejo Mundial de Lucha Libre
- Date: September 1, 1995
- City: Mexico City, Mexico
- Venue: Arena Mexico

Event chronology
| ← Previous; International Gran Prix | Next → CMLL 62nd Anniversary Show |

Wrestling is a family tradition in Lucha libre, with a large number of second or even third-generation wrestlers following in the footsteps of their relatives. Consejo Mundial de Lucha Libre (CMLL) held a tag team tournament on September 1, 1995, to pay homage to the wrestling families by holding a tournament for second or third-generation wrestlers. In a few cases the family relationship was not a blood relationship, but more of a storyline with the "Junior" wrestler either paying to use the name or being given the name by the "Senior". The winners got a trophy and no other tangible reward. The second-generation concept led to CMLL creating the La Copa Junior tournament in early 1996. The CMLL Second Generation Tag Team Tournament was won by the team of Apolo Dantés and Emilio Charles Jr.

Tournament Participants

- Apolo Dantés and Emilio Charles Jr.
- Blue Demon Jr. and Tinieblas Jr.
- Brazo de Oro and Brazo de Plata
- Dr. Wagner Jr. and Gran Markus Jr.
- El Hijo del Santo and Rayo de Jalisco Jr.
- El Hijo del Solitario and El Solitario
- Espectro Jr. and Pierroth Jr.
- Karloff Lagarde Jr. and Scorpio Jr.

Family Relationship

| Wrestler | Family | Relationship |
|---|---|---|
| Apolo Dantés | Alfonso Dantés | Father |
| Emilio Charles Jr. | Emilio Charles | Father |
| Blue Demon Jr. | Blue Demon | Adopted Father |
| Tinieblas Jr. | Tinieblas | Father |
| Brazo de Oro | Shadito Cruz | Father |
| Brazo de Plata | Shadito Cruz | Father |
| Dr. Wagner Jr. | Dr. Wagner | Father |
| Gran Markus Jr. | Gran Markus | Storyline relationship only |
| El Hijo del Santo | El Santo | Father |
| Rayo de Jalisco Jr. | Rayo de Jalisco Sr. | Father |
| El Hijo del Solitario | El Solitario | Father |
| Negro Casas | Pepe Casas | Father |
| Espectro Jr. | Espectro I | Uncle |
| Pierroth Jr. | Pierroth | Storyline relationship only |
| Karloff Lagarde Jr. | Karloff Lagarde | Uncle |
| Scorpio Jr. | Scorpio | Father |

Tournament brackets

Quarterfinals
1 | Brazo de Plata and Brazo de Oro
8 | Apolo Dantés and Emilio Charles Jr. | W
4 | Espectro Jr. and Pierroth Jr.
5 | Blue Demon Jr. and Tinieblas Jr. | W
2 | Hijo del Solitario and Negro Casas | W
7 | Karloff Lagarde Jr. and Scorpio Jr.
3 | Dr. Wagner Jr. and Gran Marcus Jr.
6 | Hijo del Santo and Rayo de Jalisco Jr. | W

Semifinals
Apolo Dantés and Emilio Charles Jr. | W
Blue Demon Jr. and Tinieblas Jr.
Hijo del Solitario and Negro Casas
Hijo del Santo and Rayo de Jalisco Jr. | W

Finals
Apolo Dantés and Emilio Charles Jr. | W
Hijo del Santo and Rayo de Jalisco Jr.

== Salvador Lutteroth Trios Tournament ==
Salvador Lutteroth Trios Tournament
- Promotion: Consejo Mundial de Lucha Libre
- Date: March 24, 1995
- City: Mexico City, Mexico
- Venue: Arena Mexico

Event chronology
| ← Previous; Torneo Gran Alternativa | Next →: 39. Aniversario de Arena México |

In 1995 Consejo Mundial de Lucha Libre (CMLL) held a one-night single elimination Trios tournament dedicated to the memory of Salvador Lutteroth, the founder of CMLL. The tournament filled the entire Friday night CMLL Super Viernes show, preceding the 1996 Homenaje a Salvador Lutteroth show becoming the unofficial forerunner for the event that is now known as Homenaje a Dos Leyendas ("Homage to two Legends") that CMLL holds every spring. The tournament was won by the team of Bestia Salvaje, Emilio Charles Jr. and Sangre Chicana, who received a trophy, but no other obvious awards for winning the tournament.

Tournament participants

- Apolo Dantés, Atlantis and Rayo de Jalisco Jr.
- Bestia Salvaje, Emilio Charles Jr. and Sangre Chicana
- Los Brazos (Brazo de Oro, Brazo de Plata and El Brazo)
- Damian el Guerrero, Guerrero del Futuro and Guerrero Maya
- Dos Caras, El Dandy and Héctor Garza
- La Ola Blanca (Dr. Wagner Jr., El Hijo del Gladiador and Gran Markus Jr.
- Espectro Jr., Cadaver de Ultratumba and Kahoz
- Los Infernales (El Satánico, Pirata Morgan and MS-1)

Tournament brackets

Quarterfinals
Damian el Guerrero, Guerrero del Futuro and Guerrero Maya
Los Brazos | W
Espectro Jr., Cadaver de Ultratumba and Kahoz
Apolo Dantés, Atlantis and Rayo de Jalisco Jr. | W
Bestia Salvaje, Emilio Charles Jr. and Sangre Chicana | W
La Ola Blanca
Los Infernales
Dos Caras, El Dandy and Héctor Garza | W

Semifinals
Los Brazos | W
Apolo Dantés, Atlantis and Rayo de Jalisco Jr.
Bestia Salvaje, Emilio Charles Jr. and Sangre Chicana | W
Dos Caras, El Dandy and Héctor Garza

Finals
Los Brazos
Bestia Salvaje, Emilio Charles Jr. and Sangre Chicana | W

== Salvador Lutteroth Tag Tournament ==
In 1999 Consejo Mundial de Lucha Libre (CMLL) held a one night, single elimination tournament on their annual Homenaje a Dos Leyendas: El Santo y Salvador Lutteroth show, which took place on March 20, 1999. The tournament was dedicated to the memory of Salvador Lutteroth, the founder of CMLL and followed both a singles tournament to honor Lutteroth the preceding year at the 1998 Homenaje a Salvador Lutteroth show and a Trios tournament. The tournament featured 8 teams in total, four teams of wrestlers whose careers peaked in the 1980s and early 1990s and four teams who were looking to make a name for themselves at the time. The last match saw the veterans Ringo Mendoza and Super Astro defeat the team of Mr. Niebla and Shocker to win the tournament and the trophy.

Veteran teams

- Kahoz and Scorpio Jr.
- Ringo Mendoza and Super Astro
- Los Missioneros del Muerte ("The Missionaries of Death"; El Signo and Negro Navarro)
- Fisman and Villano III

Younger generation

- Último Guerrero and Violencia
- El Felino and Máscara Mágica
- Olímpico and Tony Rivera
- Mr. Niebla and Shocker.

Quarter finals
Último Guerrero and Violencia | W
Kahoz and Scorpio Jr.
Ringo Mendoza and Super Astro | W
El Felino and Máscara Mágica
El Signo and Negro Navarro | W
Olímpico and Tony Rivera
Mr. Niebla and Shocker | W
Fisman and Villano III

Semi finals
Último Guerrero and Violencia
Ringo Mendoza and Super Astro | W
El Signo and Negro Navarro
Mr. Niebla and Shocker | W

Final
Mr. Niebla and Shocker
Ringo Mendoza and Super Astro | W

== Torneo Tanque Dantes ==
Torneo Tanque Dantsé
- Promotion: Consejo Mundial de Lucha Libre
- Date: February 15, 2009 to April 12, 2009
- City: Guadalajara, Jalisco, Mexico
- Venue: Arena Coliseo Guadalajara

Event chronology
| ← Previous; La Hora Cero | Next → Homenaje a Dos Leyendas |

In 2009 Consejo Mundial de Lucha Libre (CMLL) held a tag team tournament for wrestlers who work in CMLL's Guadalajara, Jalisco Arena Coliseo and its associated wrestling training school. The tournament was named after Guadalajara native and wrestling pioneer Tanque (Tank) Alfonso Dantés. The teams were paired up specifically for the tournament and did not work together on a regular basis prior to it. The teams all competed in a round robin league format, earning points for victories (two) or draws (one). The tournament started on February 15, 2009, and ran until April 12 of that year, spanning five shows in Arena Coliseo. During the tournament wrestler Boomerang had to be replaced with Meteoro for one match and Mr. Trueno replaced Rey Trueno after just one match. The team of Palacio Negro and Samurai won the tournament with four victories, 1 loss and a total of 8 points.

Teams and final standings

| Team | Win | Loss | Draw | Points |
| Palacio Negro and Samurai | 4 | 1 | 0 | 8 |
| Boomerang/Meteoro and El Gallo | 3 | 1 | 1 | 7 |
| Leon Blanco and Thunder Boy | 2 | 2 | 1 | 5 |
| Ángel del Mal and Infierno | 2 | 3 | 0 | 4 |
| Acertijo and Rey Trueno/Mr. Trueno | 2 | 3 | 0 | 4 |
| Katana and Malefico | 1 | 4 | 0 | 2 |

== Torneo Increibles de Parejas, Arena Puebla 2013 ==
Torneo Increibles de Parejas
- Promotion: Consejo Mundial de Lucha Libre
- Date: March 18, 2013 to April 1, 2013
- City: Puebla, Puebla, Mexico
- Venue: Arena Puebla

Event chronology
| ← Previous; Homenaje a Dos Leyendas | Next → Arena Coliseo 70th Anniversary Show |

Days after completing the 2013 Torneo Nacional de Parejas Increibles that concluded at the 2013 Homenaje a Dos Leyendas, CMLL held a similar tournament in Arena Puebla, in Puebla, Puebla. The tournament consisted of two qualifying blocks that took place on March 18 and 25, with a final on April 1, 2013. The tournament is based on the Lucha Libre Parejas Increibles match type where two wrestlers of opposite allegiance, portraying either villains, referred to as "Rudos" in Lucha Libre wrestling terminology or fan favorites, or "tecnicos". At times some of the team members were part of a pre-existing scripted feuds or storylines with each other. The tournament was won by Atlantis and Volador Jr. as they defeated Shocker and Rey Bucanero in the finals after the team failed to get along.

Tournament Participants
Key

| Symbol | Meaning |
|---|---|
| (T) | This wrestler is a Tecnico |
| (R) | This wrestler is a Rudo |

Block A (March 18, 2013)

- Ángel de Oro (T) and Rey Escorpión (R)
- Atlantis (T) and Volador Jr. (R)
- Blue Panther (T) and Averno (R)
- Máscara Dorada (T) and Puma (R)
- Rey Cometa (T) and Okumura (R)
- La Sombra (T) and Mr. Águila (R)
- Thunder (T) and El Terrible (R)
- Valiente (T) and Niebla Roja (R)

Block B (March 25, 2013)

- Diamante Azul (T) and Psicosis (R)
- El Hijo del Fantasma (T) and El Felino (R)
- La Máscara (T) and Dragón Rojo Jr. (R)
- Máximo (T) and Mephisto (R)
- Místico La Nueva Era (T) and Último Guerrero (R)
- Brazo de Plata (T) and Euforia (R)
- Shocker (T) and Rey Bucanero (R)
- Stuka Jr. (T) and Namajague (R)

Tournament results

First round
Rey Cometa and Okumura | W
Máscara Dorada and Puma
Blue Panther and Averno
Atlantis an Volador Jr. | W
Thunder and El Terrible | W
Ángel de Oro and Rey Escorpión
La Sombra and Mr. Águila | W
Valiente and Niebla Roja
Místico La Nueva Era and Último Guerrero | W
El Hijo del Fantasma and El Felino
Stuka Jr. and Namajague
Shocker and Rey Bucanero | W
Brazo de Plata and Euforia | W
Diamante Azul and Psicosis
Máximo and Mephisto | W
La Máscara and Dragón Rojo Jr.

Quarter-finals
Rey Cometa and Okumura
Atlantis and Volador Jr. | W
Thunder and El Terrible
La Sombra and Mr. Águila | W
Místico La Nueva Era and Último Guerrero
Shocker and Rey Bucanero | W
Brazo de Plata and Euforia
Máximo and Mephisto | W

Semi-finals
Atlantis and Volador Jr. | W
La Sombra and Mr. Águila
Shocker and Rey Bucanero | W
Máximo and Mephisto

Final
Atlantis and Volador Jr. | W
Shocker and Rey Bucanero

== Fantastica Mania tournaments ==
Fantastica Mania, is a series of annual professional wrestling major show co-promoted by Mexican professional wrestling promotion Consejo Mundial de Lucha Libre (CMLL) and Japanese New Japan Pro-Wrestling (NJPW). Fantastica Mania is a series of two to seven shows that have taken place in Japan, in January of each year since 2010. Starting in 2015 the Fantastica Mania tour has included a CMLL-wrestler only tournament each year, starting with a regular tag team tournament, followed by a tag team tournament featuring only brothers in 2018, while 2019 and 2020 featured tag team tournaments with teams made up of family members.

=== 2015 Tag team tournament ===
Brackets

Quarterfinals
Rey Cometa and Stuka Jr. | W
Bárbaro Cavernario and Mr. Niebla
Stigma and Volador Jr.
Gran Guerrero and Último Guerrero | W
Mephisto and Pólvora | W
Místico and Tritón
Atlantis and Máscara Dorada | W
La Sombra and Tetsuya Naito

Semifinals
Rey Cometa and Stuka Jr.
Gran Guerrero and Último Guerrero | W
Mephisto and Pólvora
Atlantis and Máscara Dorada | W

Finals
Gran Guerrero and Último Guerrero
Atlantis and Máscara Dorada | W

=== 2018 Brothers tag team tournament ===
Brackets

Semifinals
Gran Guerrero and Último Guerrero | W
Ángel de Oro and Niebla Roja | 15:22
El Cuatrero and Sansón | 10:25
Dragon Lee and Místico | W

Final
Gran Guerrero and Último Guerrero
Dragon Lee and Místico | W
Third place
Ángel de Oro and Niebla Roja
El Cuatrero and Sansón | W

=== 2019 Family tag team tournament ===
Brackets

Semifinals
Sansón and El Cuatrero | W
Atlantis and Atlantis Jr.
Volador Jr. and Flyer
Dragon Lee and Místico | W

Finals
Sansón and El Cuatrero
Dragon Lee and Místico | W

=== 2020 Family tag team tournament ===
Brackets

Semifinals
Sansón and El Cuatrero | W
Euforia and Soberano Jr.
Negro Casas and Tiger
Ángel de Oro and Niebla Roja | W

Final
Sansón and El Cuatrero | W
Ángel de Oro and Niebla Roja
Third place
Euforia and Soberano Jr. | W
Negro Casas and Tiger

== Torneo de parejas familiares ==
Torneo de parejas familiares
- Official poster
- Promotion: Consejo Mundial de Lucha Libre
- Date: February 24, 2020
- City: Puebla, Puebla, Mexico
- Venue: Arena Puebla

Event chronology
| ← Previous; Torneo Nacional de Parejas Increíbles | Next → Mexican National Tag Team Championship tournament |

Torneo de parejas familiares (Spanish for "Family Tag Team Tournament") is a professional wrestling tournament, produced and scripted by the Mexican professional wrestling company Consejo Mundial de Lucha Libre (CMLL). The tag team tournament took place on February 24, 2020, at CMLL's regional Arena Puebla venue in Puebla, Puebla. The tournament involved eight teams of relatives, either brothers, fathers and sons or uncles and nephews.

Participants

- Ángel de Oro and Niebla Roja – brothers
- El Cuatrero and Sansón – brothers
- Ephesto and Luciferno – brothers
- Euforia and Soberano Jr. – father/son
- El Felino and Negro Casas – brothers
- Gran Guerrero and Último Guerrero – brothers
- Máscara Año 2000 and Universo 2000 Jr. – uncle/nephew
- Rey Bucanero and Drone – uncle/nephew

Brackets

Quarterfinals
El Felino and Negro Casas | W
Ángel de Oro and Niebla Roja
Rey Bucanero and Drone
El Cuatrero and Sansón | W
Gran Guerrero and Último Guerrero | W
Máscara Año 2000 and Universo 2000 Jr.
Ephesto and Luciferno
Euforia and Soberano Jr. | W

Semifinals
El Felino and Negro Casas
El Cuatrero and Sansón | W
Gran Guerrero and Último Guerrero | W
Euforia and Soberano Jr.

Finals
El Cuatrero and Sansón | W
Gran Guerrero and Último Guerrero

Results

| No. | Results | Stipulations |
|---|---|---|
| 1 | Astro and Hijo de Centella Roja defeated Espíritu Maligno and Policeman | Best two-out-of-three falls tag team match |
| 2 | Fuego, Stigma, and Joker defeated Dark Magic, Diamond, and Okumura | Relevos increíbles six-man tag team match |
| 3 | Atlantis Jr., Star Jr., and Volador Jr. defeated Virus, Shocker, and Templario | Best two-out-of-three falls six-man tag team match |
| 4 | Ephesto and Soberano Jr. defeated El Cuatrero, Drone, El Felino, Niebla Roja, Último Guerrero, and Universo 2000 Jr. | Torneo de parejas familiares seeding battle royal |
| 5 | El Felino and Negro Casas defeated Ángel de Oro and Niebla Roja | Torneo de parejas familiares quarterfinal match |
| 6 | El Cuatrero and Sansón defeated Rey Bucanero and Drone | Torneo de parejas familiares quarterfinal match |
| 7 | Gran Guerrero and Último Guerrero defeated Máscara Año 2000 and Universo 2000 Jr. | Torneo de parejas familiares quarterfinal match |
| 8 | Euforia and Soberano Jr. defeated Ephesto and Luciferno | Torneo de parejas familiares quarterfinal match |
| 9 | El Cuatrero and Sansón defeated El Felino and Negro Casas | Torneo de parejas familiares semifinal match |
| 10 | Gran Guerrero and Último Guerrero defeated Euforia and Soberano Jr. | Torneo de parejas familiares semifinal match |
| 11 | El Cuatrero and Sansón defeated Gran Guerrero and Último Guerrero by disqualification | Torneo de parejas familiares final match |

== See also ==
- List of CMLL singles wrestling tournaments
- List of CMLL Mini-Estrellas tournaments
