= Super Astros =

- Genre: Professional wrestling
- Presented by: Marcelo Rodríguez; Carlos Cabrera; Hugo Savinovich
- Starring: WWF roster
- Country of origin: United States
- Original language: Spanish
- No. of episodes: 39

Production
- Camera setup: Multicamera setup
- Running time: 28 minutes
- Production company: Titan Sports, Inc.

Original release
- Network: Univision
- Release: November 22, 1998 – September 5, 1999

Super Astros is a Spanish-language American professional wrestling television program produced by the World Wrestling Federation (WWF). The program aired from November 22, 1998 to September 9, 1999 on the Spanish-language Univision network in the United States.

== History ==
On November 1, 1998, the WWF taped the first episode of Super Astros in Austin, Texas at the Frank Erwin Center. The first episode aired on November 22, 1998 with host Marcelo Rodríguez, on commentary with Carlos Cabrera and Hugo Savinovich who were the commentators for Spanish-language WWF broadcasts of various pay-per-views and backstage interviews by Maria Felipe. Their weekly programming along with the main event match of the first taping being El Hijo del Santo vs. Super Loco. Throughout the majority of its run, the program featured wrestlers from the AAA and Consejo Mundial de Lucha Libre (CMLL) promotions and wrestlers from their Japanese partner Michinoku Pro Wrestling in addition to WWF-signed wrestlers. In August 1999, the WWF announced that they would be cancelling Super Astros following failed renegotiations with Univision to expand the program from 30 minutes to 1 hour and increase the budget from approximately $17,000 to $50,000. The final episode was taped on August 9, 1999 in Rosemont, Illinois with a six-man tag team match between the Los Boricuas (El Merenguero, Jose Estrada, and Miguel Perez) and the team of Apolo Dantes, Pantera, and Papí Chulo.
