= Scorpio Jr. =

Mexican professional wrestler (1966–2024)

Personal information
- Born: Rafael Núñez Juan; October 11, 1966 Mexico City, Mexico
- Died: November 7, 2024 (aged 58)

Professional wrestling career
- Ring name(s): El Bandido; Imágen; Red Scorpion; Sadam; Scorpio Jr.
- Billed height: 1.74 m (5 ft 8 1/2 in)
- Billed weight: 98 kg (216 lb)
- Billed from: Mexico City, Mexico
- Trained by: Scorpio; Rafael Salamanca
- Debut: August 30, 1985

Rafael Núñez Juan (October 11, 1966 – November 7, 2024) was a Mexican professional wrestler, who was best known under his ring name Scorpio Jr. Núñez was the son of professional wrestler "Scorpio", and was trained by his father and Rafael Salamanca before making his debut on August 30, 1985. Núñez was originally an Enmascarado, masked wrestler, but lost his mask as a result of a loss to the team of Negro Casas and El Hijo del Santo on March 19, 1999, after which his real identity was revealed.

Over the years Scorpio Jr. worked for virtually all major Mexican professional wrestling promotions including Consejo Mundial de Lucha Libre (CMLL), Asistencia Asesoría y Administración (AAA) and International Wrestling Revolution Group (IWRG). He was also one of the founding members of the wrestling group called Los Guapos (the Hansomes) as well as a group called Los Talibanes (the Taliban), both with longtime wrestling partners and friends Emilio Charles Jr. and Bestia Salvaje. During his time in CMLL, he won the CMLL World Tag Team Championship with Bestia Salvaje as well as the 1998 Leyenda de Plata tournament. While working for IWRG he won the IWRG Intercontinental Heavyweight Championship on four occasions, the IWRG Intercontinental Tag Team Championship with Ricky Cruz, the IWRG Intercontinental Trios Championship with Cerebro Negro and Veneno and the 2008 Rey del Ring tournament.

== Early life ==
Rafael Núñez Juan was born on October 11, 1966, in Mexico City, Mexico. He was the son of Rafael Núñez Contreras, who wrestled under the ring name Scorpio from the 1960s until the 1990. Originally Núñez's father did not want his son to become a professional wrestler, instead encouraging him to participate in other sports instead. At the age of 14, Núñez joined the National Institute of Sport (Instituto Nacional del Deporte) where he took up Olympic wrestling, a sport he participated in for two years.

== Professional wrestling career ==
At the age of 16 Núñez attended a professional wrestling school in Mexico City, Mexico under the tutelage of Rafael Salamanca. During his first lesson, Núñez was put through such a rigorous regime that it made him vomit. When Núñez returned for lessons the following day Salamanca agreed to train him full-time as well as getting his father to take part in his training. On August 30, 1984, Núñez made his professional wrestling debut, teaming with Pioloto Suicida against Los Bándalos (Memo Arenas and Ray Torres). Núñez initially worked as an enmascarado called Imágen but later changed his name to Scorpio Jr. - a name his godfather had used when teaming with Núñez's father and a name he now used to openly acknowledge his family connections.

=== Consejo Mundial de Lucha Libre (1990–2004) ===
When Scorpio Jr. began working in Guadalajara he became a friend of Emilio Charles Jr. and Bestia Salvaje, forming a group that would team together off and on for years.

==== Scorpio Jr. and Bestia Salvaje (1996–1999) ====
Scorpio Jr. and Bestia Salvaje became involved in a controversial storyline as they teamed with El Felino against Felino's brother Negro Casas, El Dandy, and Héctor Garza. During the match it looked like El Felino turned on his brother, allowing Bestia Salvaje and Scorpio Jr. to beat up Negro Casas. During the final moments of the match, El Felino pulled his mask off, revealing that it was actually El Hijo del Santo in disguise, making his surprise CMLL return after losing to Casas at the CMLL 63rd Anniversary Show. The surprise appearance of El Hijo del Santo and the attack on Negro Casas resulted in a minor riot in Arena Mexico. This led to Scorpio Jr. and Bestia teaming with El Hijo del Santo on a regular basis over the following two years, often opposite Negro Casas and various partners. In late 1998 Bestia Salvaje and Scorpio Jr. turned on El Hijo del Santo during a match, leading to Negro Casas saving his former rival. Bestia and Scorpio Jr. won the vacant CMLL World Tag Team Championship after defeating the Headhunters, Atlantis and Lizmark and El Satánico and Dr. Wagner Jr. on November 13, 1998 in a tournament. The tag team championship became a focus of the storyline with El Hijo del Santo and Negro Casas, which lead to a match on February 5, 1999. Casas and Hijo del Santo won the match by disqualification and thus the championship as well, but refused to accept the belts due to how the match ended. The two teams had a rematch the following week, where Bestia Salvaje and Scorpio Jr. regained the championship. The storyline reached its highlight at the 1999 Homenaje a Dos Leyendas show on March 19. The show was El Hijo del Santo risk his mask and Negro Casas risk his hair as they defeated Bestia Salvaje and Scorpio Jr. in the main event. As a result of the loss, Bestia Salvaje was shaved bald, while the masked Scorpio Jr. was forced to remove his mask and reveal his name, Rafael Núñez Juan.

==== Los Guapos (1999–2002) ====
After Shocker lost his mask at the CMLL 66th Anniversary Show Shocker he stated that he was okay with being unmasked since his face was "1000% Guapo" ("1000% Handsome"). He developed a narcissistic, self-obsessed rudo character, who exhibited various metrosexual traits and looked down on anyone who was not as handsome as he was. In the following months, Shocker would often team up with Scorpio Jr. and Bestia Salvaje. Following a series of vignettes, Shocker convinced both of his partners to have their hair bleached blond and that they were also Guapo like him forming a group known as Los Guapos. Scorpiro, Jr. and Bestia Negra were both older, seasoned veteran wrestlers and neither were actually considered good looking, in fact Scorpio, Jr.'s nickname up until that point had been El Rey Feo ("The Ugly King"). 2000 Shocker was invited to work for New Japan Pro-Wrestling (NJPW) on several occasions and due to his NJPW tours of Japan Scorpio Jr. and Bestia Negra often found themselves without a partner for Trios matches, their solution was to bring in Emilio Charles Jr. to become the fourth Guapo team member, Charles Jr. like his partners used the Guapo name more ironically than factual. After returning from NJPW Shocker objected to someone joining "his" group without his approval, but at first went along with it. Over the following months, Shocker's displeasure with the rest of the team grew and eventually, he split from the team, turning tecnico in the process. Shocker began a long-running storyline feud with Los Guapos. The storyline built to its peak at the 2001 Sin Piedad show on December 14. In the main event, Shocker defeated Emilio Charles Jr. in a Lucha de Apuestas match, forcing Charles to have all his hair shaved off as a result of his loss. As a result of the victory, Shocker regained the rights to the "Los Guapos" name.

==== Los Talibanes (2002–2004) ====
While Shocker reformed Los Guapos, initially with Máscara Mágica and later El Terrible, Bestia Salvaje, Scorpio Jr. and Emilio Charles Jr. became known as Los Talibanes (the Taliban). As part of their image change, all three wrestlers began wearing Bedouin robes and headdresses to the ring, pretending to be part of the terrorist group. The feud with Shocker and his group continued over the following years, including several multi-man Lucha de Apuestas matches. On August 1, 2003 El Terrible defeated Bestia Salvaje in a domo de la muerte steel cage match that also included the other members of Los Talibanes and Los Guapos. The feud culminated in another six-way Lucha de Apuestas match on September 24, 2004, ending with Shocker pinning Bestia Salvaje, forcing him to have his hair shaved off afterwards.

=== Independent circuit (2005–2024) ===
When Scorpio Jr. and Zumbido left CMLL to join Asistencia Asesoría y Administración (AAA) he formed Los Guapos in AAA as well. When Scorpio Jr. left AAA in 2008 the Los Guapos remained in AAA and Scorpio Jr. disassociated himself with the group. After leaving AAA Scorpio Jr. joined International Wrestling Revolution Group (IWRG) where he won their annual Rey del Ring tournament in 2008. He also teamed up with Ricky Cruzz to win the IWRG Intercontinental Tag Team Championship from Los Junior Capos (Hijo de Cien Caras and Hijo de Máscara Año 2000) in the summer of 2009.

== Personal life and death ==
Núñez was the father of two teenage boys, both of whom are Olympic style wrestlers. Núñez did not want his boys to follow in his footsteps and become professional wrestlers, just like his father did not initially want him to become a professional wrestler.

Núñez died on November 7, 2024, at the age of 58.

== Championships and accomplishments ==
- Consejo Mundial de Lucha Libre

- CMLL World Tag Team Championship (2 times) – with Bestia Salvaje
- Leyenda de Plata: 1998

- Federación Universal de Lucha Libre

- FULL Championship (1 time)

- Full Contact Wrestling

- FCW Live Heavyweight Championship (1 time)

- International Wrestling League

- IWL International Tag Team Championship (1 time) - with Super Crazy

- International Wrestling Revolution Group

- IWRG Intercontinental Heavyweight Championship (4 times)
- IWRG Intercontinental Tag Team Championship (1 time) - with Ricky Cruz
- IWRG Intercontinental Trios Championship (1 time) – with Cerebro Negro and Veneno
- Rey del Ring: 2008

- Universal Wrestling Association

- UWA/UWF Intercontinental Tag Team Championship (1 time) – with Shu El Guerrero
- UWA World Trios Championship (3 times) – with Shu El Guerrero and Engendro (2), Shu El Guerrero and Villano V (1)

== Luchas de Apuestas record ==
Winner (wager)	Loser (wager)	Location	Event	Date	Notes
Scorpio Jr. (mask)	Aristóteles I (hair)	N/A	Live event	N/A	
Scorpio Jr. (mask)	Tortuguillo Karateka I (mask)	Naucalpan, State of Mexico	Live event	August 9, 1992	
Scorpio Jr. (mask)	Black Scorpio (mask)	Naucalpan, State of Mexico	Live event	October 25, 1992	
Negro Casas (hair) and El Hijo del Santo (mask)	Bestia Salvaje (hair) and Scorpio Jr. (mask)	Mexico City	Homenaje a Dos Leyendas	March 19, 1999	
Nicho el Millonario (hair)	Scorpio Jr. (hair)	Tijuana, Baja California	Live event	December 22, 2000	
El Hijo del Santo (mask)	Scorpio Jr. (hair)	Naucalpan, State of Mexico	Live event	December 19, 2002	
Scorpio Jr. (hair)	Enterrador (hair)	Naucalpan, State of Mexico	Live event	July 2003	
Shocker (hair)	Scorpio Jr. (hair)	Guadalajara, Jalisco	Live event	March 21, 2004	(Note: Part of a multiman cage match, last two competitors in the cage.)
Shocker (hair)	Scorpio Jr. (hair)	Toluca, State of Mexico	Live event	July 3, 2004	(Note: Finals of a "Loser advances" tournament.)
Villano III (hair)	Scorpio Jr. (hair)	Xalapa, Veracruz	Live event	December 1, 2005	
El Hijo del Santo (mask)	Scorpio Jr. (hair)	Los Ángeles, California	Live event	July 16, 2005	
Scorpio Jr. (hair)	Brazo de Plata (hair)	Ciudad Madero, Tamaulipas	Guerra de Tianes	December 8, 2006	(Note: Match also included Alan Stone and Intocable.)
Alan Stone (hair)	Scorpio Jr. (hair)	Ciudad Madero, Tamaulipas	Guerra de Tianes	November 30, 2007	(Note: Steel cage match that also included Super Caló, Intocable, Zumbido and Decnis)
Scorpio Jr. (hair)	Masada (hair)	Naucalpan, State of Mexico	Live event	December 14, 2008	(Note: Match also included Veneno)
Villano III (hair)	Scorpio Jr. (hair)	Ciudad Nezahualcóyotl, State of Mexico	Live event	February 26, 2009	
El Oriental (hair)	Scorpio Jr. (hair)	Ciudad Nezahualcóyotl, State of Mexico	Live event	September 16, 2010	(Note: Steel cage match that also included Marco Corleone, Black Warrior, Juventud Guerrera, Charly Manson and Zumbido.)
Último Guerrero (mask)	Scorpio Jr. (hair)	Toluca, State of Mexico	Live event	November 19, 2010	(Note: Ruleta Rusa match that also included Toscano, Místico, Sagrado, Misterioso II, El Felino and Shigeo Okumura)
Scorpio Jr. (hair)	El Oriental (hair)	Ciudad Nezahualcóyotl, State of Mexico	Live event	January 1, 2012	(Note: Four-way match that also included El Intocable and Lizmark Jr.)
Súper Muñeco (mask)	Scorpio Jr. (hair)	Tlalnepantla de Baz, State of Mexico	Live event	October 6, 2012	(Note: Six-man tag team steel cage Masks vs. Hairs match, where Scorpio Jr., Black Terry and Shu el Guerrero faced Súper Muñeco, Súper Pinocho and Súper Ratón.)
Último Guerrero (hair)	Scorpio Jr. (hair)	Pachuca, Hidalgo	Live event	November 3, 2016	(Note: Last two wrestlers in a steel cage match that also included Lizmark Jr., El Terrible, Vangelis, and Alan Stone.)
