= Apolo Dantés =

Mexican professional wrestler (born 1968)

Personal information
- Born: José Luis Amezcua Muñoz; September 28, 1968 (age 58) Guadalajara, Jalisco, Mexico

Professional wrestling career
- Ring name: Apolo Dantés
- Billed height: 1.86 m (6 ft 1 in)
- Billed weight: 105 kg (231 lb)
- Billed from: Guadalajara, Jalisco, Mexico
- Trained by: Alfonso Dantés; Diablo Velazco; Alberto Muñoz
- Debut: December 4, 1988
- Retired: 2017

José Luis Amezcua Muñoz (born September 28, 1968) is a Mexican professional wrestler, trainer and promoter, best known by his ring name Apolo Dantés. He is the son of Alfonso Dantés, a successful and respected professional wrestler during the 1960s and 1970s. He was a longtime mainstay of Consejo Mundial de Lucha Libre (CMLL) throughout the 1990s and now owns and operates "Dantés Lucha Factory" in Guadalajara, Jalisco, Mexico.

During his in-ring career he's won the CMLL World Heavyweight Championship, CMLL World Middleweight Championship, and the NWA World Light Heavyweight Championship. He also won the 1994 Copa de Oro tournament with El Dandy, the Copa de Arena México with Black Warrior and Shocker and the Second Generation Tag Team Tournament with Emilio Charles Jr.

Dantés was a part of the Los Capos ("The Bosses") stable alongside Cien Caras, Máscara Año 2000, and Universo 2000. He also worked for the World Wrestling Federation in 1998 and 1999 on their Hispanic focused show Super Astros. His in-ring career ended in the mid-2000s, followed by him transitioning into a behind the scenes role of training and booking matches at Arena Coliseo and late founded his own wrestling promotion, Dantés' Lucha Factory in Guadalajara, Jalisco, Mexico.

== Personal life ==
José Luis Amezcua Muñoz was born on September 28, 1968, in Guadalajara, Jalisco, Mexico. He is the son of José Luis Amezcua Díaz, a professional wrestler known under the ring name Alfonso "Tanque" Dantés. His grandfather, Alfonso Amezcua, was also a professional wrestler, known as "Al Amezuca". José Amezcua's uncles, Alberto Muñoz, Virgilio Amezcua ("Septiembre Negro") and Índio Jerónimo were also professional wrestlers. José Amezcua younger brother, César Antonio Amezcua, would also become a wrestler later in life, known under the names César Dantés, "All Star" and "Máscara Mágica" (Note: Not to be mistaken for Eddie Guerrero who was the first Máscara Mágica, or Antonio Gómez Medina who was the second wrestler to use the name.)

== Professional wrestling career ==
Amezuca trained for his professional wrestling career under his father, his uncle Alberto Muñoz, and renowned Lucha libre trainier Diablo Velazco. He made his debut on December 4, 1988, under the name "Apolo Dantés", adopting the same last name as his father used.

=== Consejo Mundial de Lucha Libre (1989–2006) ===
Through his fathers connections Dantés began working regularly for Consejo Mundial de Lucha Libre (CMLL) in 1989. On July 25, 1992, Dantés became the NWA World Light Heavyweight Champion when he defeated El Satánico. Dantés held the prestigious title for 243 days until Jaque Mate defeated him for it. On September 11, 1994, Dantés won the CMLL World Middleweight Championship by defeating Javier Llanes, but lost the belt 77 days later to Satánico. He defeated Silver King to win the CMLL World Heavyweight Championship on June 23, 1995. During his reign as Heavyweight Champion Dantés successfully defended it against both Corazon de Leon and Vampiro. Dantés lost the title to Rayo de Jalisco Jr. on April 14, 1996.

==== Los Capos (1996–2005) ====
In mid-1996 Cien Caras, Máscara Año 2000 and Universo 2000 returned to CMLL after working elsewhere for four years. The trio began teaming with Apolo Dantés to form a group called Los Capos ("The Bosses"), a Rudo (bad guy) group that was heavily featured in CMLL's heavyweight division. Dantés competed in the 1997 CMLL International Gran Prix but was defeated in the semi-final by eventual tournament winner Steel. A year later he made it all the way to the finals of the 1998 version of the Gran Prix and defeated Rayo de Jalisco Jr to win the tournament. In 2003 Apolo Dantés last in-ring highlight saw him earn a match for the CMLL World Heavyweight Champion Mr. Niebla but was defeated in three falls.

=== World Wrestling Federation (1998–1999) ===
Starting in late 1998, CMLL began working with the United States–based World Wrestling Federation (WWF) to allow several of CMLL's workers to appear on WWF's weekly Spanish language, Latino focused WWF Super Astros show. For approximately 10 months, Dantés worked several Super Astros shows, wrestling against CMLL luchadors, Puerto Ricans and Japanese wrestlers. In his first match, which was taped on November 16, 1998, Dantés defeated El Merenguero. His last Super Astros match took place on May 25, 1999, where he defeated Funaki. In his last match for the WWF, he, Pantera, and Papi Chulo lost to Los Boricuas (El Merenguero, José Estrada Jr., and Miguel Pérez Jr.) in match that took place before WWF's Shotgun Saturday Night show.

=== Semi-retirement and booker (since 2006) ===
By the middle-2000s Apolo Dantés was more active as a wrestling trainer and match-maker at CMLL's Arena Coliseo in his native Guadalajara, Jalisco. For the next couple of years he booked matches for the weekly shows, as well as training various trainees for CMLL. In mid-2009 Dantés was fired from his position at Arena Coliseo and replaced by Rubén Soria. Following his dismissal from Arena Coliseo Dantés formed his own wrestling school and promotion called "Dantés' Lucha Factory", based in Guadalajara, Jalisco. Apolo Dantés owned and operated the Dantés Lucha Factory from 2009 until 2011, at which point his brother César took ownership the company, as Apolo replaced Soria to become the CMLL Guadalajara booker once more when Soria retired. By 2015 Dantés was once again replaced as the booker for CMLL. Since Dantés began working more behind the scenes he has only wrestled on a very limited schedule, with records of one match in 2011, 2013 & 2016, with his last known matches being a short spurt in early 2017.

== Other media ==
Amezcua was one of several wrestlers interviewed for the documentary "50", chronicling the first 50 years of Arena Coliseo in Guadalajara, Jalisco.

== Championships and accomplishments ==
- Consejo Mundial de Lucha Libre
  - NWA World Light Heavyweight Championship (1 time) (Note: Despite its use of the NWA for some of its championships, CMLL is not an NWA affiliated promotion and has not been since 1990. As a result, the National Wrestling Alliance no longer sanctions or recognizes any of those championships.)
  - CMLL World Heavyweight Championship (1 time)
  - CMLL World Middleweight Championship (1 time)
  - International Gran Prix (1998)
  - Copa de Arena México: 2001 – with Black Warrior and Shocker
  - Copa de Oro 1994 – with El Dandy
  - Second Generation Tag Team Tournament – with Emilio Charles Jr.
  - Occidente Middleweight Championship
- Pro Wrestling Illustrated
  - PWI ranked him #169 of the 500 best singles wrestlers in the PWI 500 in 1999
  - PWI ranked him #204 of the 500 best singles wrestlers in the PWI Years in 2003

== Luchas de Apuestas record ==
Winner (wager)	Loser (wager)	Location	Event	Date	Notes
Apolo Dantés (hair)	Super Brazo (hair)	León, Guanajuato	Lucha en Jaula	N/A	
Apolo Dantés (hair)	Javier Cruz (hair)	Mexico City	Super Viernes	August 9, 1991	
Apolo Dantés (hair)	Cachorro Mendoza (hair)	Guadalajara, Jalisco	CMLL show	April 1992	
Apolo Dantés (hair)	Javier Cruz (hair)	Mexico City	Domingos Arena Mexico	April 5, 1992	
Apolo Dantés (hair)	Miguel Pérez Jr. (hair)	Mexico City	CMLL show	October 13, 1995	
Ricky Santana (hair)	Apolo Dantés (hair)	Mexico City	CMLL 65th Anniversary Show	September 18, 1998	
Apolo Dantés (hair)	Pepe Aguayo (hair)	Guadalajara, Jalisco	CMLL Guadalajara Domingos	July 4, 1999	
Brazo de Plata (hair)	Apolo Dantés (hair)	Mexico City	Super Viernes	November 26, 1999	(Note: This was a triangle match that also included Pierroth Jr.)
Emilio Charles Jr. (hair)	Apolo Dantés (hair)	Mexico City	CMLL show	November 23, 2001	
Pierroth Jr. (hair)	Apolo Dantés (hair)	Mexico City	CMLL Martes De Coliseo	February 18, 2003	
