= Emilio Charles Jr. =

Mexican professional wrestler

- Emilio Charles Jr. during the height of his career

Personal information
- Born: Sergio Emilio Charles Garduño; October 12, 1956 Monterrey, Nuevo León, Mexico
- Died: December 28, 2012 (aged 56) Mexico City, Mexico
- Relative: Emilio Charles (father)

Professional wrestling career
- Ring name: Emilio Charles Jr.
- Billed height: 1.75 m (5 ft 9 in)
- Billed weight: 89 kg (196 lb)
- Billed from: Monterrey, Nuevo León, Mexico
- Trained by: Diablo Velasco; Abuelo Carrillo
- Debut: February 1980

Sergio Emilio Charles Garduño (October 12, 1956 – December 28, 2012) was a Mexican professional wrestler, best known under the ring name Emilio Charles Jr. Over the years, Charles worked for all of the major Mexican professional wrestling promotions, including Consejo Mundial de Lucha Libre (CMLL), Asistencia Asesoría y Administración and International Wrestling Revolution Group (IWRG).

He is also one of the founding members of the wrestling group called Los Destructores ("the Destroyers"), along with Vulcano and Tony Arce. He was also a key member of the group Los Guapos ("the Handsome Ones"), as well as a group called Los Talibanes (the Taliban), both with longtime wrestling partners and friends Scorpio Jr. and Bestia Salvaje.

== Personal life ==
Sergio Emilio Charles Garduño was born on October 12, 1956, in Monterrey, Nuevo León, Mexico. His father was a professional wrestler in the 1940s and 1950, known under the ring name Emilio Charles.

== Professional wrestling career ==
While his father was a professional wrestler, Emilio Charles Jr. was not trained by him; instead, he was trained by Diablo Velasco and Abuelo Carrillo before making his debut in February 1980.

=== Consejo Mundial de Lucha Libre (1984–2007) ===
==== Los Destructores (1987–1990) ====
In the mid-1980s, he joined up with the real life-brother tag team of Tony Arce and Vulcano to form a trio known as Los Destructores ("The Destroyers"). The group was created in the same vein as Los Infernales, a trio of rudos (bad guys) who worked well together and could produce top-quality matches with a variety of opponents. On January 31, 1988, Los Destructores defeated Hombre Bala, Jerry Estrada and Pirata Morgan to win the Mexican National Trios Championship. Los Destructores held the titles for almost two years and had a series of championship defenses that drew packed houses all over Mexico.

While teaming with Arce and Vulcano, Charles also worked as a singles wrestler, including a long drawn-out storyline with Atlantis. The storyline saw Charles win the NWA World Middleweight Championship from Atlantis on July 17, only to lose it back to him eleven days later. Charles won the title for a second time by defeating Atlantis on August 12. His run as a double champion ended on April 28, 1989, when Ángel Azteca won the title. On November 20, Los Destructores lost the trios title to Black Terry, Jose Luis Feliciano and Shu El Guerrero. Not long after the title loss, Charles left Los Destructores, who replaced him with Rocco Valente.

On August 30, 1990, Charles defeated Javier Cruz to win the Mexican National Middleweight Championship, holding it until November 20, when he lost the belt to Octagón. Charles remained active in the middleweight division for over three years, defeating El Dandy to win the CMLL World Middleweight Championship on December 16, 1992. He held the championship for almost ten months before Dandy regained the title on October 5, 1993.

==== Los Chacales (1995–1996) ====
In early 1995, Charles formed a trio with Bestia Salvaje and Sangre Chicana, referred to as Los Chacales (Spanish for "The Jackals"). The trio was one of eight teams competing in the one-night Salvador Lutteroth Trios Tournament in March, defeating La Ola Blanca (Dr. Wagner Jr., Gran Markus Jr., and El Hijo del Gladiador) in the opening round, Dos Caras, El Dandy, and Héctor Garza in the semi-finals and Los Brazos (Brazo de Oro, Brazo de Plata, and El Brazo) in the finals. The following week, Los Chacales defeated La Ola Blanca to win the CMLL World Trios Championship, becoming the sixth overall championship team. Los Chacales' reign as CMLL World Trios Champions lasted 357 days, losing it to Dos Caras, Garza and La Fiera at Homenaje a Salvador Lutteroth ("Homage to Salvador Lutteroth") on March 22, 1996. On September 1, Charles and Apolo Dantés won CMLL's Second Generation Tag Team Tournament. While most participants were second-generation wrestlers like Charles, the tournament also included some fictional family relationships, like Hijo del Gladiador.

In 1997, the makeshift team of Charles, El Satánico and Rey Bucanero defeated Apolo Dantés, Black Warrior and Dr. Wagner Jr. in the finals of a one-night eight-team tournament to win the CMLL World Trios Championship. The team only held onto the championship for a month before losing it to La Ola Azul ("The Blue Wave"; Atlantis, Lizmark, and Mr. Niebla) on April 29. A few months later, Charles and Wagner defeated Atlantis and Brazo de Plata in the final of an eight-team tournament to win the vacant CMLL World Tag Team Championship. While not being a regular team, the two managed to defend the title for five months before losing it to Mr. Niebla and Shocker on January 23, 1998.

==== Los Guapos (1999–2002) ====
After Shocker lost his mask at the CMLL 66th Anniversary Show, he stated he was okay with being unmasked since his face was "1000% Guapo" ("1000% Handsome"). He developed a narcissistic, self-obsessed rudo character, who exhibited various metrosexual traits and treated those who were not as handsome as him with scorn. In the following months, Shocker would often team up with Bestia Salvaje and Scorpio Jr. Following a series of vignettes, Shocker convinced both of his partners to have their hair bleached blond, stating they were also Guapo like him, thus forming a group known as Los Guapos. Neither Scorpio Jr. or Salvaje, who were older, seasoned veteran wrestlers, were actually considered good looking; Scorpio Jr.'s nickname up until that point had been El Rey Feo ("The Ugly King").

In 2000, Shocker was invited to work for New Japan Pro-Wrestling (NJPW) on several occasions, but due to his tours, Salvaje and Scorpio Jr. often found themselves without a partner for trios matches. Their solution was to bring in Emilio Charles Jr. to become the fourth Guapo team member; Charles Jr., like his partners, used the Guapo name more ironically than factually. After returning from NJPW, Shocker objected to someone joining "his" group without his approval, but at first agreed to it. Over the following months, Shocker's displeasure with the rest of the team grew, and eventually, he split from the team, turning tecnico in the process and beginning a long-running storyline feud with Los Guapos. The storyline built to its peak in the main event of Sin Piedad ("No Mercy") on December 14. 2001, where Shocker defeated Emilio Charles Jr. in a Lucha de Apuestas, forcing Charles to have all his hair shaved off as a result of his loss. As a result of the victory, Shocker regained the rights to the "Los Guapos" name.

==== Los Talibanes and final years (2002–2007) ====
While Shocker reformed Los Guapos, initially with Máscara Mágica and later El Terrible, Bestia Salvaje, Scorpio Jr. and Emilio Charles Jr. became known as Los Talibanes ("The Taliban"). As part of their image change, all three wrestlers began wearing Bedouin robes and headdresses to the ring, pretending to be part of the terrorist group. The feud with Shocker and his group continued over the next two years, including several multi-man Lucha de Apuestas matches. On August 1, 2003, El Terrible defeated Salvaje in a domo de la muerte steel cage match that also included the other members of Los Talibanes and Los Guapos. The feud culminated in another six-way Lucha de Apuestas on September 24, 2004, which ended with Shocker pinning Salvaje, forcing him to have his hair shaved off afterward.

Charles' schedule slowed down from 2005 to 2007, with him only working two notable storylines in that time period. The first one saw Charles shaved bald as a result of losing a Lucha de Apuestas to Máximo on October 29, 2006. In the last notable feud Charles worked, he wrestled newcomer Máscara Purpura in a series of matches, culminating in a Lucha de Apuestas on September 16, 2007, which Charles lost, again being shaved bald.

=== Later career (2007–2011) ===
After leaving CMLL in 2007, Charles worked a limited number of matches for International Wrestling Revolution Group (IWRG) in 2009 and two matches on the independent circuit in 2011. His last recorded match took place on December 3, 2011, as he, Fuerza Guerrera and Juventud Guerrera lost to Los Payasos (Coco Amarillo, Coco Azul and Coco Rojo) by disqualification.

== Death ==
Charles died of kidney failure on December 28, 2012, at the age of 56.

== Championships and accomplishments ==
- Consejo Mundial de Lucha Libre (CMLL)
  - CMLL World Middleweight Championship (2 times)
  - CMLL World Tag Team Championship (1 time) – with Dr. Wagner Jr.
  - CMLL World Trios Championship (2 times) – with Sangre Chicana and Bestia Salvaje (Los Chacales), El Satánico and Rey Bucanero
  - Mexican National Middleweight Championship (1 time)
  - Mexican National Trios Championship (1 time) – with Vulcano and Tony Arce (Los Destructores)
  - NWA World Middleweight Championship (2 times)
  - Distrito Federal Heavyweight Championship (1 time)
  - Second Generation Tag Team Tournament (1995) – with Apolo Dantés
  - Salvador Lutteroth Trios Tournament – with Bestia Salvaje and Sangre Chicana

== Luchas de Apuestas record ==
Winner (wager)	Loser (wager)	Location	Event	Date	Notes
Emilio Charles Jr. and Rino Castro (hair)	Comando Ruso I and II (hair)	Mexico City	Domingos de Coliseo	March 3, 1985	
Emilio Charles Jr. (hair)	Enfermero Jr. (hair)	Mexico City	Domingos de Coliseo	December 14, 1985	
Los Xaviers (Américo Rocca, Chamaco Valaguez and Javier Llanes) (hair)	Los Destructores (hair) (Emilio Charles Jr., Tony Arce and Vulcano)	Mexico City	Super Viernes	July 31, 1987	
Emilio Charles Jr. (hair)	Javier Cruz (hair)	Mexico City	Super Viernes	June 24, 1998	
Draw	Emilio Charles Jr. (hair); El Dandy (hair)	Mexico City	Super Viernes	July 28, 1989	(Note: Charles and El Dandy wrestled to a draw, therefore both men lost their hair.)
Emilio Charles Jr. (hair)	El Dandy (hair)	Mexico City	Live event	October 29, 1993	
Emilio Charles Jr. (hair)	La Fiera (hair)	Mexico City	38. Aniversario de Arena México	April 15, 1994	
Emilio Charles Jr. (hair)	Miguel Pérez Jr. (hair)	Mexico City	Live event	October 14, 1994	
Emilio Charles Jr. (hair)	Silver King (hair)	Mexico City	CMLL 63rd Anniversary Show	September 27, 1996	
Emilio Charles Jr. (hair)	El Satánico (hair)	Mexico City	Homenaje a Salvador Lutteroth	March 20, 1998	
Emilio Charles Jr. and Máscara Año 2000 (hair)	Ricky Santana and El Boricua (hair)	Mexico City	Super Viernes	September 25, 1998	
Emilio Charles Jr. (hair)	Ringo Mendoza (hair)	Mexico City	CMLL Domingos de Coliseo	April 15, 2001	
Emilio Charles Jr. (hair)	Apolo Dantés (hair)	Mexico City	CMLL show	November 23, 2001	
Shocker (hair)	Emilio Charles Jr. (hair)	Mexico City	Sin Piedad	December 14, 2001	
Emilio Charles Jr. (hair)	Asesino Negro (hair)	Guadalajara, Jalisco	CMLL Guadalajara Domongos	June 15, 2003	
Emilio Charles Jr. (hair)	El Satánico (hair)	Nezahualcoyotl, Mexico State	independent show	November 24, 2005	
Máximo (hair)	Emilio Charles Jr. (hair)	Mexico City	CMLL show	October 29, 2006	
Mascara Purpura (mask)	Emilio Charles Jr. (hair)	Mexico City	CMLL show	September 16, 2007	
