= Sin Salida (2015) =

Mexican professional wrestling supercard show

- Official Poster of the event advertising all 7 matches, featuring Último Guerrero (left) and Rey Escorpión (right)
- Promotion: Consejo Mundial de Lucha Libre
- Date: July 17, 2015 (aired July 17, 2015 (matches 1-6); August 1, 2015 (main event))
- City: Mexico City, Mexico
- Venue: Arena México

Event chronology
← Previous; En Busca de un Ídolo	Next → CMLL 82nd Anniversary Show

Sin Salida chronology
← Previous; 2013	Next → 2017

Sin Salida (2015) (Spanish for "No Escape"/"No Exit") was a major professional wrestling event produced by the Mexican Lucha Libre-promotion Consejo Mundial de Lucha Libre (CMLL) that took place on Friday night July 17, 2015, in CMLL's main venue, Arena México, nicknamed "the cathedral of Lucha Libre" in lieu of CMLL's normally scheduled Super Viernes ("Super Friday") show. The main event was a best two-out-of-three falls Lucha de Apuestas, or bet match where both Rey Escorpión and Último Guerrero "bet" their hair on the outcome of the match and the loser was forced to have all his hair shaved off afterwards as per Lucha Libre traditions. The show also hosted two first-round matches of CMLL's 2015 En Busca de un Ídolo ("In Search of an Idol") tournament where Esfinge wrestled Canelo Casas and Delta was supposed to face Blue Panther Jr., but wrestled Hechicero instead. The show contained four additional matches. Although it was not announced ahead of time, the first six matches of the show were broadcast live on the Terra Networks' home page for free.

== Production ==
=== Background ===
The Mexican wrestling company Consejo Mundial de Lucha Libre (Spanish for "World Wrestling Council"; CMLL) has held a number of major shows over the years using the moniker Sin Salida ("No Ext" or "No Escape"). CMLL has intermittently held a show billed specifically as Sin Salida since 2009, primarily using the name for their "end of the year" show in December, although once they held a Sin Piedad show in August as well. All Sin Salida shows have been held in Arena México in Mexico City, Mexico which is CMLL's main venue, its "home". Traditionally CMLL holds their major events on Friday Nights, which means the Sin Salida shows replace their regularly scheduled Super Viernes show.

On June 24, 2015 Mexican lucha libre, or professional wrestling promotion Consejo Mundial de Lucha Libre (CMLL) announced that they had signed a contract for a match between Rey Escorpión and Último Guerrero that would main event a major CMLL show on July 17, 2015 but did not announce the name of the show at that point. Days later CMLL revealed that the show was billed as Sin Salida (Spanish for "No Exit" or "No Escape"). The 2015 version of Sin Salida would be the fourth time CMLL would hold a Sin Salida show, with previous shows happening in 2009, 2010 and 2013. This would be the first time CMLL held a Sin Salida show in July, having held one in December (2009) and two in June in previous years. The show would be on Friday night, which is the night that CMLL traditionally hold most of their major shows and tournaments on, replacing their regular Super Viernes ("Super Friday") show. For decades CMLL has normally held at least one major show during the summer, alternating between different event names, but the show has traditionally taken place about halfway between CMLL's annual Homenaje a Dos Leyendas ("Homage to two Legends") in March and their Anniversary show in September. CMLL announced the remaining six matches for the show after the previous Friday's Super Viernes had concluded, which was their regular schedule for announcing their weekly Super Viernes cards.

=== Storylines ===
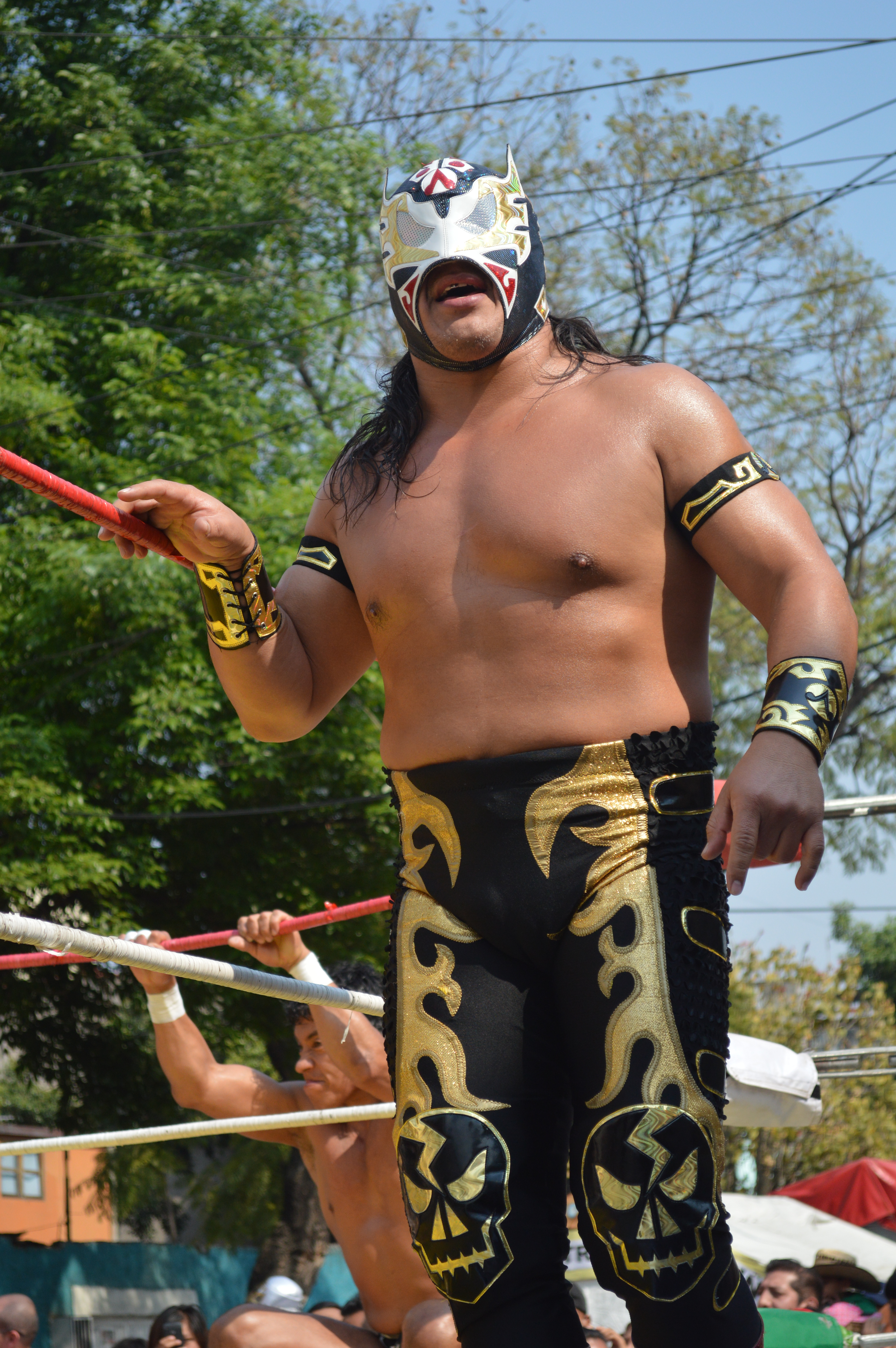
Último Guerrero (while still masked) risked and kept his hair in the main event of the show.

Sin Salida featured a total of seven professional wrestling matches, in which some wrestlers were involved in pre-existing scripted feuds or storylines and others are teamed up with no backstory. Wrestlers themselves portrayed either heels (referred to as "Rudos" in Mexico, wrestlers who portray the "bad guys") or faces ("Tecnicos" in Mexico, the "good guys") as they competed in matches with pre-determined outcomes. The 2015 Sin Salida would be the fourth time CMLL had held a major event under that name, with previous events in 2009, 2010 and 2013. The original Sin Salida took place in December, while all subsequent Sin Salida shows have been held during the summer in either June or July. All events were held on Fridays as replacements for the normal CMLL Super Viernes ("Super Friday") shows in CMLL's main arena, Arena México.

The storyline rivalry between Rey Escorpión and Último Guerrero that led to the main event match began back in the summer of 2011. While working under the ring name Escorpión he was teamed up with Último Guerrero for the 2011 Gran Alternativa tournament, a tag team tournament where a rookie (Escorpión) would team up with an experienced wrestler (Guerrero) for the tournament. The duo defeated the teams of Magnus and Brazo de Plata, Mortiz]and El Terrible, and Diamante and La Sombra to earn a spot in the final match. On April 8, 2011 Escorpión and Guerrero defeated Máscara Dorada and Metal Blanco to win the 2011 Gran Alternativa tournament. Shortly after the Gran Alternativa victory Escorpión changed his name to Rey Escorpión ("Scorpion King") and joined Último Guerrero's Los Guerreros del Infierno group that also included Dragón Rojo, Jr. at the time. In the summer of 2012 Rey Escorpión began having problems with other members of Los Guerreros, especially with the new Guerrero associates Euforia and Niebla Roja. The tension let to Escorpión being kicked out of the group, although the confrontations never turned to an actual fight, leading to Último Guerrero introducing both Euforia and Niebla Roja as full fledge members. On August 31, 2012, during CMLL's weekly Super Viernes show Rey Escorpión teamed with his former Los Guerreros teammates for a Trios tournament, actually winning the tournament despite not getting along with his teammates. Two weeks later the team were unsuccessful in their challenge for the CMLL World Trios Championship, which only furthered the issues between Rey Escorpión and Los Guerreros. The tension finally erupted into a physical encounter as Dragón Rojo, Jr. turned on Los Guerreros, siding with Rey Escorpión as they attacked Euforia after a match on the October 5th Super Viernes show. Afterward Escorpión and Dragón Rojo, Jr. announced that they were forming their own group, targeting Los Guerreros del Infierno. The team of Rey Escorpión, Dragón Rojo, Jr., and Pólvora was unveiled as Los Revolucionarios del Terror ("The Revolutionaries of Terror"). Following the formation of Los Revolucionarios the two factions faced off on several shows, but at the time the storyline never developed further.

In 2014 Rey Escorpión went on hiatus from CMLL, which led to Dragón Rojo, Jr. turning to the tecnico side, ending Los Revolucionarios at that point in time. Rey Escorpión returned to CMLL in March 2015, followed by Dragón Rojo, Jr. returning to the Rudo side shortly afterwards. Dragón Rojo, Jr. explained that it was a ploy by Los Revolucionarios and that he only turned tecnico to fool the tecnico side. In late Último Guerrero started to team with Thunder on a regular basis, although he was never officially made a member of Los Guerreros. In April and May 2015 Thunder started to have problems with Guerrero and other members of his group, causing him to turn on them during a match on the June 5 CMLL Super Viernes show. The match started out with Thunder teaming up with Guerrero and Euforia to take on Los Revolucinarios, but by the end of the match Thunder switched sides as he attacked Guerrero and the four rudos beat down the remaining two Guerreros members. Thunder was subsequently introduced as the fourth member of Los Revolucionarios, who also referred to themselves as Los Chicos Malo ("The Bad Guys") during interviews. In his first outing as a Revolucionario the trio of Rey Escorpión, Thunder and Dragón Rojo, Jr. lost to Guerrero, Euforia and Gran Guerrero, not because they were pinned but because the trio was disqualified in both falls for excessive violence and unmasking of both Euforia and Gran Guerrero. During the Super Viernes show on June 19 a wrestling "angle" played out where Rey Escorpión grabbed a framed picture from a fan at ringside and smashed the frame and glass over Último Guerrero's head, causing a disqualification and leaving Guerrero on the canvas with the frame around his head as Rey Escorpión gloated. Following the Glass attack event the idea that the two factions would face off in a multi-man Luchas de Apuestas match was suggested by CMLL itself and enforced by all eight making both hair and mask challenges at a CMLL press conference on June 24 Hours after the press conference CMLL held an official contract signing between Rey Escorpión and Último Guerrero for a Luchas de Apuestas match with both wrestlers putting their hair on the line, not including any of the six masked wrestlers involved in the storyline. At the following Friday night Super Viernes show Rey Escorpión and Los Revolucionarios once again had the upper hand, defeating Los Guerreros in two straight falls, the second fall occurring after a low blow on Último Guerrero that the referee did not see. On July 14, 2015 Rey Escorpión challenged Máximo for the CMLL World Heavyweight Championship, where Guerrero walked to ringside during the third and deciding fall, distracting Rey Escorpión long enough for Máximo to gain the third and deciding pinfall to retain the championship.

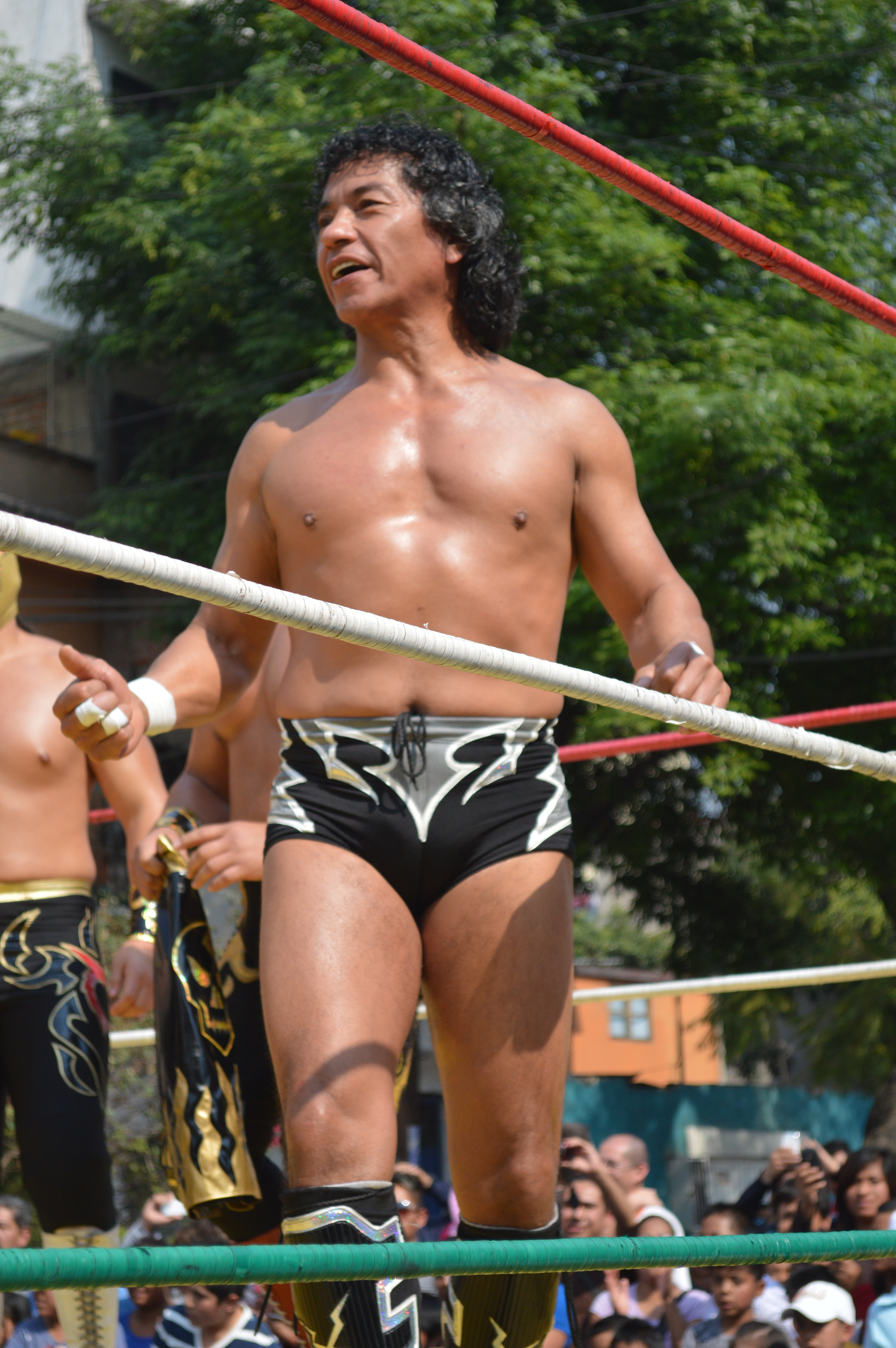
En Busca de un Ídolo coach Negro Casas

The 2015 version of the En Busca de un Ídolo ("In Search of an Idol") tournament was the fourth year in a row CMLL had held the tournament, a tournament designed to highlight some of the younger, or lower ranked wrestlers in CMLL, identifying which "Idol" was ready to move up the ranks. The tournament plays out in the same format as reality TV competitions which includes earning points from match results, judges critique after the matches and a weekly online poll. In the weeks prior to the Sin Salida all eight competitors will have competed for seven weeks in a Round-robin tournament on CMLL's Tuesday and Friday shows, with the July 17th show slated to be the final two matches of the first round. The eight wrestlers were divided into two groups, each with their own coach. Negro Casas' team included Blue Panther Jr., Canelo Casas, Delta and Guerrero Maya Jr. while Virus was the coach of Boby Zavala, Disturbio, Esfinge and Flyer. The judges for the tournament have consisted of referee El Tirantes, trainer Hijo del Solitario and active wrestler Shocker, plus a fourth judge that changes from show to show. CMLL has yet to announce who the fourth judge will be for the July 17th show. CMLL announced that the two En Busca de un Ídolo matches would be Esfinge vs. Canelo Casas and Delta vs. Blue Panther Jr. This left Flyer vs. Guerrero Maya Jr. and Disturbio vs. Boby Zavala for July show in Arena Mexico to finish out the first round of the tournament. At the beginning of the seventh and final week of the first round the top four ranked wrestlers were Guerrero Maya Jr., Boby Zavala, Flyer and Esfinge.

En Busca de un Ídolo standings
Rank	Name	Total points
1	Guerrero Maya Jr.	466
2	Bobby Zavala	470
3	Flyer	344
4	Esfinge	322
5	Disturbio	329
6	Carnelo Casas	292
7	Delta	257
8	Blue Panther Jr.	253

== Event ==
Blue Panther Jr. was scheduled to compete in the third match of the night, an En Busca de un Ídolo match, but was replaced by Hechicero with the only explanation was that Blue Panther Jr. was not able to be at the show due to Force majeure. Delta won the match with less than a minute left on the clock, pinning Hechicero after a missed dive off the top rope. After the match on Delta stood before the judging panel for their feedback. Guest judge Diamante Azul gave Delta a 6 for his efforts, Hijo del Gladiador gave him a 6, Shocker 5 and finally El Titantes gave Delta a 6 for a total of 23 points. After winning his match Esfinge was the first competitor to walk up the ramp to face the judges. For his effort Diamante Azul gave him 8 points, Hijo del Gladiador 8, Shocker 8 and El Tirantes 10 points for a total of 34. The judges were less positive for Canelo Casas' assessment with Casas receiving 7, 7, 7 and 8 points for a total of 29.

Since the formation of Los Ingobernables ("The Unruly") Rush, La Sombra, La Máscara and Marco Corleone had claimed to be tecnicos diferentes, or a different kind of good guys, which meant that they did not get along with other tecnico wrestlers but generally fought against rudos. For the Sin Salida show that was not the case Rush, La Sombra and Marco Corleone faced the tecnico team of Atlantis, Diamante Azul and Volador Jr. and Los Ingobernables clearly played the rudo part of the match, cheating whenever they had a chance including pulling Diamante Azul's mask off at one point and tearing Atlantis' mask apart. With Volador Jr. and La Sombra being bitter rivals for years it was no surprise that the two did not fight a clean match but both Rush and Corleone used underhanded tactics to win the match including a low kick to Volador Jr. to win the third and deciding fall. After the match Volador Jr. challenged La Sombra to put his mask on the line against Volador Jr.'s hair, a challenge turned down by La Sombra as he had already unmasked Volador Jr. Moments later Diamante Azul upped the challenge, Diamante Azul and Volador Jr. against La Sombra and Rush and Azul would put his mask on the line as well. The challenge was not accepted, nor declined by Los Ingorbernables at the time.

The main event match started out less as a wrestling match and more of a fight as the two long time rivals finally faced off one-on-one. The two fought both inside and outside, more concerned about hitting each other than executing any sort of wrestling moves. During the first fall a blow from Rey Escorpión hit Último Guerrero in the nose, causing him to bleed profusely. Escorpión won the first fall after a powerbomb slam. Guerrero turned the tide in the second fall as the crowd began to rally behind him, chanting for Guerrero as he applied his Pulpo Guerrero ("The Guerrero Octopus"; an Over-the-shoulder single leg Boston crab with neckscissors) and forced Rey Escorpión to submit, evening the score between the two. The third and final fall saw Guerrero win after executing the "Guerrero Special", Inverted superplex Rey Escorpión which led to the pinfall and Guerrero's first hair win in his career. After his loss in the main event Rey Escorpión tried to get out of having his hair shaved off by running backstage to hide, but moments later he was brought back to the ring by a number of officials and restrained while he had his long hair shaved off as a result of his loss to Guerrero.

== Aftermath ==
Último Guerrero and Rey Escorpión were booked to face off once more at the following week's Super Viernes show as they were scheduled to be on opposite sides of a Parejas Increibles match, with Guerrero teaming up with Diamante Azul (tecnico) and Shocker (rudo) to take on Escorpión, Thunder (rudo) and Rush (neither).

With his absence from the Sin Salida show Blue Panther Jr. lost any chance of advancing to the second round of the En Busca de un Ídolo as he was more than 90 points from fourth place, with only a maximum of 40 points being possible in the fan poll for that week. Delta, despite winning, was also out of contention for the second round as he had 300 points after the match and the fourth place Flyer, who had yet to wrestle and receive points that week had 344, more points than the fan poll could give him. While Canelo Casas was only 23 points out of fourth place the fact that both the fifth and fourth place competitors, Disturbio and Flyer, had yet to wrestle and receive points Casas was all but eliminated from the tournament.

== Results ==
No.	Results	Stipulations	Times
1	Ángel de Oro and Stuka Jr. defeated La Comando Caribeño (Comandante Pierroth and Misterioso Jr.) – two falls to one	Best two-out-of-three falls six-man "Lucha Libre rules" tag team match	16:07
2	La Amapola, Dalys la Caribeña and Zeuxis defeated Dark Angel, Estrellita and Princesa Sujei – two falls to one	Best two-out-of-three falls six-man "Lucha Libre rules" tag team match	21:36
3	Delta defeated Hechicero	2015 En Busca de un Ídolo first round match	09:03
4	Esfinge defeated Canelo Casas	2015 En Busca de un Ídolo first round match	05:43
5	Negro Casas and Los Hijos del Infierno (Ephesto and Mephisto) defeated Dragon Lee and the Sky Team (Místico and Valiente) – two falls to one	Best two-out-of-three falls six-man "Lucha Libre rules" tag team match	21:30
6	Los Ingobernables (Marco Corleone, La Sombra and Rush) defeated Atlantis, Diamante Azul and Volador Jr. – two falls to one	Best two-out-of-three falls six-man "Lucha Libre rules" tag team match	15:00
7	Último Guerrero defeated Rey Escorpión – two falls to one	Best two-out-of-three falls Lucha de Apuestas hair vs. hair match	22:01
