= Sin Salida (2017) =

Mexican professional wrestling supercard show

- Official poster of the event
- Promotion: Consejo Mundial de Lucha Libre
- Date: December 25, 2017
- City: Mexico City, Mexico
- Venue: Arena México

Event chronology
← Previous; Leyenda de Azul	Next → Sin Piedad

Sin Salida chronology
← Previous; 2015	Next → —

Sin Salida (2017) (Spanish for "No Escape"/"No Exit") was a major professional wrestling event, scripted and produced by the Mexican Lucha Libre-promotion Consejo Mundial de Lucha Libre (CMLL) that took place on Monday night December 25, 2017, in CMLL's main venue, Arena México, nicknamed "the cathedral of Lucha Libre". It was the fifth overall show CMLL has held under the Sin Salida name.

The main event was a ten-man steel cage match where all ten competitors risked their wrestling mask under Lucha de Apuestas, or "bet match" rules. The first wrestler escaped the cage after just over three minutes into the match as Pegasso, Nitro, Cancerbero, Oro Jr., Raziel, Fiero, Templario and Star Jr. all escaped the cage. In the end Starman pinned El Hijo del Signo, forcing him to unmask. After the match, he was forced to unmask and reveal his real name, Marco Antonio Sánchez Rodríguez, age 38. The show included four additional matches

== Production ==
=== Background ===
The Mexican wrestling company Consejo Mundial de Lucha Libre (Spanish for "World Wrestling Council"; CMLL) has held a number of major shows over the years using the moniker Sin Salida ("No Ext" or "No Escape"). CMLL has intermittently held a show billed specifically as Sin Salida since 2009, primarily using the name for their "end of the year" show in December, although once they held a Sin Piedad show in August as well. All Sin Salida shows have been held in Arena México in Mexico City, Mexico which is CMLL's main venue, its "home". Traditionally CMLL holds their major events on Friday Nights, which means the Sin Salida shows replace their regularly scheduled Super Viernes show. The 2017 Sin Salidashow was the fifth time CMLL held a show under that name, with the debut in 2009, another show in 2010, 2013 and 2015.

=== Storylines ===
The 2017 Sin Salida show featured six professional wrestling matches scripted by CMLL with some wrestlers involved in scripted feuds. The wrestlers portray either heels (referred to as rudos in Mexico, those that play the part of the "bad guys") or faces (técnicos in Mexico, the "good guy" characters) as they perform.

== Results ==
No.	Results	Stipulations	Times
1	Pequeño Nitro and Pierrothito defeated Shockercito and Último Dragoncito	Best two-out-of-three falls six-man "Lucha Libre rules" tag team match	12:24
2	La Jarochita, Marcela and Princesa Sugehit defeated Dalys la Caribeña, Tiffany and Zeuxis	Best two-out-of-three falls six-woman "Lucha Libre rules" tag team match	12:37
3	Ángel de Oro, Blue Panther Jr. and Niebla Roja defeated El Terrible, Hechicero and Rey Bucanero	Best two-out-of-three falls six-man "Lucha Libre rules" tag team match	12:21
4	Kraneo, Comandante Pierroth and Sam Adonis defeated La Peste Negra (El Felino, Mr. Niebla and Negro Casas)	Best two-out-of-three falls six-man "Lucha Libre rules" tag team match	09:35
5	Starman defeated El Hijo del Signo; Also in the cage: Raziel, Cancerbero, Fiero, Nitro, Oro Jr., Pegasso, Star Jr. and Templario	10-man Lucha de Apuestas steel cage match	19:40

Cage match order of escape

1. Pegasso (03:42)
2. Nitro (04:40)
3. Cancerbero (06:08)
4. Oro Jr. (07:00)
5. Raziel (08:47)
6. Fiero (09:29)
7. Templario (11:23)
8. Star Jr. (12:15)
