= Hechicero =

Mexican professional wrestler

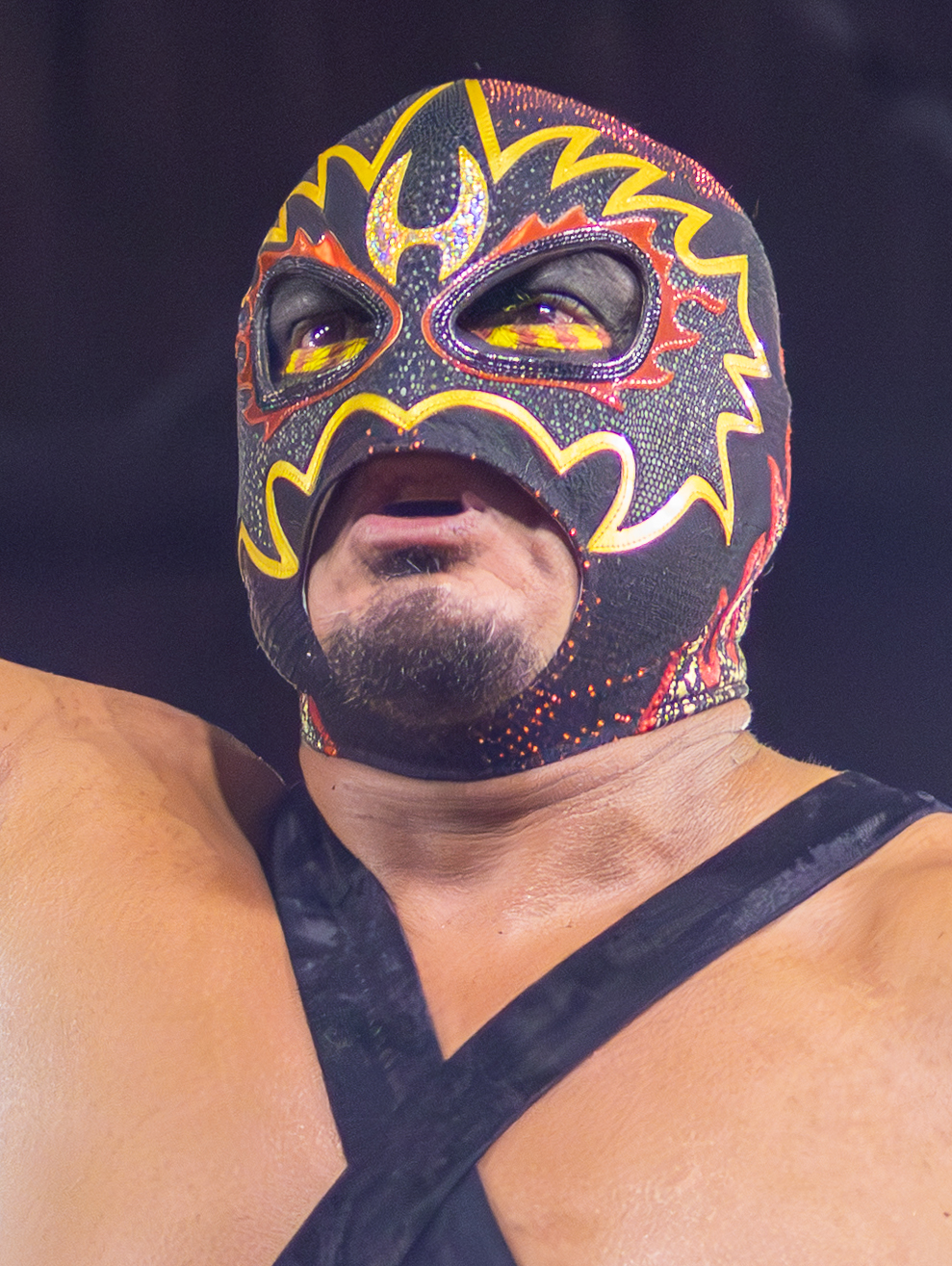
- Hechicero in August 2025

Professional wrestling career
- Ring name(s): Hechicero; Rey Hechicero
- Billed height: 1.78 m (5 ft 10 in)
- Billed weight: 104 kg (229 lb)
- Trained by: Arcángel (Note: This is a Monterrey wrestler named Arcángel, not to be mistaken for Arkangel de la Muerte.); Cachorrro Zapata; Chucho Villa; Garringo; Mario Segura; Pequeño Diamante; Katsuyori Shibata
- Debut: February 15, 2001

Hechicero (Spanish for "Sorcerer") is a Mexican professional wrestler. He is signed to American promotion All Elite Wrestling (AEW), where he is a member of the Don Callis Family. He is also signed to Mexican promotion Consejo Mundial de Lucha Libre (CMLL), where he is a former two-time CMLL World Heavyweight Champion. He also makes appearances in Japan for CMLL's partner promotion New Japan Pro-Wrestling (NJPW) and in the United States for AEW's sister promotion Ring of Honor (ROH).

Hechicero's real name is not publicly known, as is often the case with masked wrestlers in Mexico, where their private lives are kept a secret from the wrestling fans. He was formerly billed as Rey Hechicero ("Wizard King") when making appearances outside CMLL, but there is no pretense that it is two different characters that he is playing. In CMLL, he is a one-time NWA World Historic Light Heavyweight Champion, one-time CMLL World Trios Champion with Euforia and Mephisto as part of Los Infernales, and the winner of the 2023 Leyenda de Azul tournament.

== Professional wrestling career ==
=== Early career (2001–2014) ===
In Mexico, there is a long-standing tradition of keeping the personal information of masked wrestlers private from the public, including wrestling promotions not revealing their real names and news outlets not asking for personal details in interviews. As such, the real name of the wrestler known under the ring names Rey Hechicero and Hechicero is not public knowledge, nor has the year of his birth been established. Hechicero himself has stated that he made his debut for a local wrestling promotion in Monterrey, Nuevo León on February 15, 2001, referring to it as "Hechicero's" birthday; it has not been confirmed if Monterrey is his birthplace, although it is where he resides. During interviews, he revealed that he had been trained by a number of Monterrey local wrestlers, both before and after his debut, such as Arcángel, Cachorrro Zapata, Chucho Villa, Garringo, Mario Segura and Pequeño Diamante, as well as Japanese wrestler Katsuyori Shibata. In 2004, Rey Hechicero was listed as having worked a number of matches for the Naucalpan-based International Wrestling Revolution Group (IWRG), but did not tour extensively outside Nuevo León.

In 2007, he became involved in a storyline feud against another local Monterrey wrestler called Gitano del Norte ("The Gypsy of the North"), leading to both men putting their masks on the line on the outcome of a Lucha de Apuestas ("bet match"). Rey Hechicero won and forced his opponent to unmask which, in lucha libre, is considered more prestigious than winning championships. He capped 2007 by defeating Tigre Universitario to win the WWA World Middleweight Championship, which was part of a long running storyline between the two. Both men were involved in a four-man Lucha de Apuestas on March 23, 2008, escaping from the match with their masks while Valiente pinned Sergio Romo Jr., forcing Romo to be shaved bald since he was not masked. Later that year, he was scheduled to team up with Último Guerrero for a Ruleta de la muerte ("Roulette of death") tournament, where the losers of the match advance and have to fight each other for their masks. Rey Hechicero suffered an injury shortly before the tournament and was replaced by Difunto II. There was no verification if he had indeed been injured or if the replacement took place, since whoever had originally agreed to lose his mask changed his mind and Difunto II agreed to lose his match. Also in 2008, Rey Hechicero began working for a local promotion called Poder Y Honor ("Power and Honor"; PYH), and in 2009, he outlasted Chucho Mar Jr., Estrella Dorada Jr. and Tigre Universitario to become the inaugural PYH Heavyweight Champion. In the following years, he worked for a number of wrestling promotions as they toured through Monterrey, including winning the mask of Caifán Rockero I at a Perros del Mal show in March 2010.

=== Consejo Mundial de Lucha Libre (2014–present) ===
==== Generacion 2014 (2014–2016) ====
In early 2014, Rey Hechicero, now known as simply "Hechicero", was introduced as part of CMLL's Generacion 2014 class alongside seven other wrestlers making their CMLL debut around the same time. He was the only Generacion 2014 member not related to someone working for CMLL or a second-generation wrestler; he and Espíritu Negro were notably older than the rest of the group. Hechicero made his in-ring debut in Guadalajara, Jalisco, the site of one of CMLL's wrestling schools, on January 7, teaming with El Rebelde and Hooligan in a loss to Dragon Lee, Star Jr. and Starman. A month later, he and one of CMLL's most experienced rudos, Último Guerrero, participated in the Torneo Gran Alternativa ("Great Alternative Tournament"), where a rookie (in storyline terms) and a veteran team up for a tag team elimination match. Hechicero and Star Jr. won an eight-man battle royal used to determine the match ups for the first round, where Hechicero and Guerrero defeated Star Jr. and Atlantis, but were defeated by eventual tournament winners Bárbaro Cavernario and Mr. Niebla in the second round.

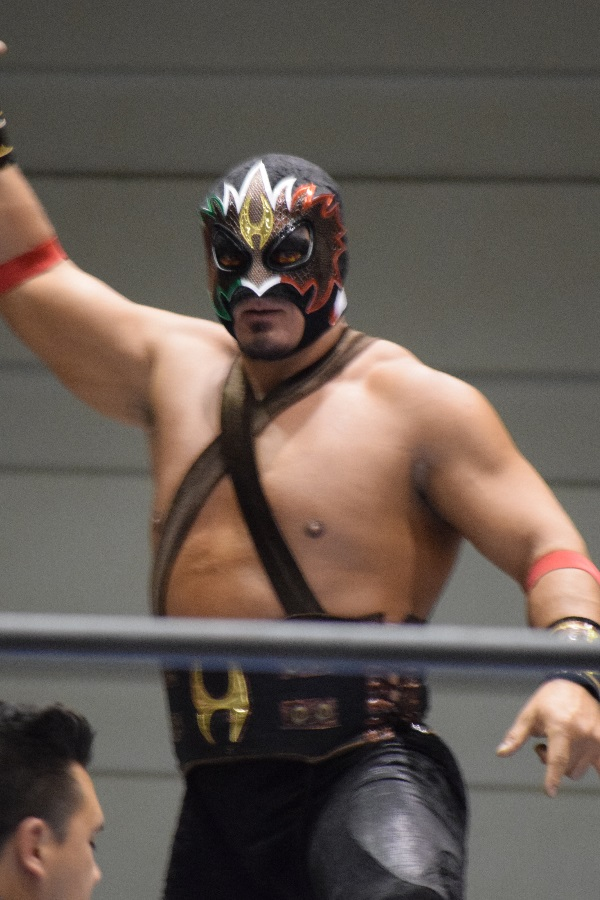
Hechicero in 2017

Hechicero was one of sixteen wrestlers competing in the annual En Busca de un Ídolo ("In search of an Idol") tournament, featuring younger wrestlers (mostly low-to-mid-card wrestlers) that were given an opportunity to showcase their wrestling skills on a national scale. Each wrestler would earn points from the outcome of their matches, feedback from a panel of judges and a weekly online poll. Hechicero was one of eight wrestlers to qualify, surviving a torneo cibernetico elimination match along with Cavernario, Cachorro, Dragon Lee, Guerrero Negro Jr., Soberano Jr., Star Jr., and Super Halcón Jr. He ended up on the team being coached by Virus each week, focusing not just on the actual wrestling, but also how to play their characters in the ring, interact with the fans and so on. During the weekly judging, Hechicero received praise for his in-ring skills, but also several comments on the fact that he did not wrestle a very rudo style and needed to be more aggressive in the ring, something he tried to incorporate from week to week. After the first round, Hechicero won almost every single weekly online poll, propelling him to the top of the ranking at the end with a total of 565 points, 114 more than the second place Cavernario. In the second round, Hechicero lost to Cavernario, but defeated both Lee and Cachorro to earn a total of 250 points, including the majority of the online poll votes, qualifying Hechicero for the finals against Cavernario, who defeated Hechicero to win the tournament.

Hechicero debuted a new look in October, including a new mask design and trunks in black with gold or red embellishment. As part of his image makeover, Hechicero began carrying a bowl that burned with red flames as part of his entrance rituals. At ringside, Hechicero often touches and sometimes scoops out the flames from the bowl without hurting his hands. On December 16, Hechicero and Cavernario unsuccessfully challenged Los Reyes de la Atlantida (Delta and Guerrero Maya Jr.) for the CMLL Arena Coliseo Tag Team Championship. For the Torneo Nacional de Parejas Increibles ("National Incredible Pairs Tournament") on February 27, 2015, Hechicero was forced to team with then-rival Ángel de Oro, losing to Atlantis and Último Guerrero in the first round. On March 20, at Homenaje a Dos Leyendas ("Homage to Two Legends"), Hechicero, Vangelis and Virus defeated Blue Panther Jr., The Panther and Stuka Jr. At Sin Salida ("No Escape") on July 17, Hechicero replaced Blue Panther Jr. for one match in that year's En Busca de un Ídolo tournament, losing to Delta. He and Vangelis unsuccessfully challenged Guerrero Maya Jr. and The Panther for the CMLL Arena Coliseo Tag Team Championship on May 28, 2016.

==== Feud with Stuka Jr. (2016–2021) ====
On October 25, Hechicero outlasted Atlantis, Blue Panther Jr., Bobby Z, Esfinge, Gran Guerrero, Johnny Idol, La Máscara, Misterioso II, Stuka Jr., Valiente and Vangelis in a torneo cibernetico to earn a match for Rey Bucanero's NWA World Historic Light Heavyweight Championship, which he won on November 1, marking Hechicero's first CMLL championship. Later that month, he failed to win the Leyenda de Azul ("The Blue Legend") tournament. As part of their rivalry, Hechicero and Stuka Jr. were paired for the Torneo Nacional de Parejas Increíbles, but lost to El Terrible and Rush in the first round on February 17, 2017. At Homenaje a Dos Leyendas on March 17, he teamed with Los Hijos del Infierno (Mephisto and Luciferno), replacing Ephesto, to unsuccessfully challenge El Sky Team (Místico, Valiente and Volador Jr.) for the CMLL World Trios Championship. During the Reyes del Aire ("Kings of the Air") tournament on April 7, Hechicero eliminated Dragon Lee and Máximo Sexy, before Volador Jr. eliminated him. By virtue of holding a title, he participated in the Universal Championship tournament on June 30, but lost to Volador Jr. in the first round. Hechicero, Dragón Rojo Jr. and Pólvora defeated Blue Panther Jr., The Panther and Stuka Jr. at the CMLL 84th Anniversary Show on September 16.

Hechicero was paired with Soberano Jr. for the Torneo Nacional de Parejas Increíbles on February 2, 2018, but lost to Místico and Mephisto in the first round. On May 4, he and Espanto Jr. were disqualified during the first round of the Torneo Gran Alternativa against Electrico and Místico. Hechicero lost the NWA World Historic Light Heavyweight Championship to Stuka Jr. on August 14, failing to regain it on January 13, 2019. The two were paired for that year's Torneo Nacional de Parejas Increíbles on April 19, but lost in the first round to El Cuatrero and Místico. At the CMLL 86th Anniversary Show on September 27, Hechicero, Bucanero and El Hijo del Villano III lost to Diamante Azul, Dulce Gardenia and Titán by disqualification. On February 14, 2020, he and Flyer lost to Bandido and Último Guerrero in the first round of the Torneo Nacional de Parejas Increíbles. For a third time, Hechicero and Stuka Jr. were paired for the following year's edition of the tournament on June 11, but yet again failed to advance past the first round in a loss to Templario and Volador Jr. On September 3, he competed in the semi-final torneo cibernetico of a tournament for the Copa Independencia ("Independence Cup"), but was eliminated near the end by Guerrero.

==== CMLL World Heavyweight Champion (2021–present) ====
At the CMLL 88th Anniversary Show on September 24, 2021, Hechicero defeated Último Guerrero to win the CMLL World Heavyweight Championship for the first time in his career. Following his title win, Hechicero joined El Satánico's reformed Los Infernales stable alongside Euforia and Mephisto. He made his first successful title defense on November 12 against Bárbaro Cavernario. At Homenaje a Dos Leyendas on March 18, 2022, Los Infernales lost to Los Guerreros Laguneros (Gran Guerrero and Último Guerrero) and Atlantis in the semi-finals of a tournament for the CMLL World Tag Team Championship. On April 22, Hechicero competed in that year's Universal Championship tournament, defeating Gemelo Diablo II in the first round before losing to Niebla Roja in the quarter-finals. He successfully defended the title against Euforia during the International Grand Prix on August 19. At the CMLL 89th Anniversary Show on September 16, Los Infernales defeated Negro Casas, Star Jr. and Titán. On September 30, at Noche de Campeones ("Night of Champions"), Los Infernales defeated Los Malditos (El Sagrado and Los Gemelos Diablo) to win the CMLL World Trios Championship, making Hechicero a double champion. On November 7, Hechicero lost the CMLL World Heavyweight Championship to Gran Guerrero.

When Los Infernales lost the CMLL World Trios Championship to Atlantis Jr., Star Jr. and Volador Jr. on June 2, 2023, Hechicero attacked Mephisto and left Los Infernales. On November 17, he and old rival Stuka Jr. outlasted Ángel de Oro, Atlantis, Cavernario, El Terrible, El Sagrado, Esfinge, Niebla Roja, Star Black, Último Guerrero and Volcano to advance to the finals of the Leyenda de Azul on November 24, where Hechicero was victorious. They were once more paired for the Torneo Nacional de Parejas Increibles on March 22, 2024, faring better as they defeated Dragón Rojo Jr. and Templario in the first round, but lost to Atlantis Jr. and Soberano Jr. in the semi-finals. At the CMLL 91st Anniversary Show on September 13, Hechicero defeated Euforia in a four-way Lucha de Apuestas also involving Esfinge and Valiente, forcing Euforia to unmask and reveal his birth name. On November 29, he lost to Místico in the finals of the Leyenda de Azul. On September 19, 2025, Hechicero, Volador Jr. and Zandokan Jr. lost to Atlantis Jr., Máscara Dorada and Neón at the CMLL 92nd Anniversary Show.

On March 20, 2026, Hechicero defeated Claudio Castagnoli at Homenaje a Dos Leyendas to win his second CMLL World Heavyweight Championship. On April 10, he defeated Ángel de Oro, Místico, Neón, Niebla Roja, Stigma and Templario in a seven-man elimination match to qualify for the finals of the Universal Championship tournament, where he lost to Dorada in a three-way match also involving Black Tiger on April 24. On July 31, he successfully defended his title against Roderick Strong. On August 8, Hechicero won his first International Gran Prix by lastly eliminating Castagnoli. On September 18 at the CMLL 93rd Anniversary Show, Hechicero successfully defended his title against Castagnoli and Zack Sabre Jr. in a three-way match. He lost the CMLL World Heavyweight Championship to Sabre Jr. at Lucha Kingdom on November 16, ending his reign at 221 days.

=== Independent circuit (2014–present) ===
When Hechicero began working for Consejo Mundial de Lucha Libre (CMLL) in 2014, CMLL allowed him to work for various local promotions. On December 25 of that year, he unsuccessfully challenged Black Terry for the FLLM Master Championship at a Promociones Cara Lucha show in Ciudad Nezahualcoyotl. On November 27, 2016, he successfully defended the NWA World Historic Light Heavyweight Championship against Caifán at a Lucha Memes show. On December 3, Hechicero and Fly Warrior competed in the Torneo Juventud y Gloria ("Tournament of Youth and Glory"), where an established "veteran" wrestler teams up with a rookie. The duo lost to Último Guerrero and Templario in the first round. On March 26, 2017, he and Virus failed to win the CMLL Arena Coliseo Tag Team Championship from Black Terry and Negro Navarro. At a Pura Raza show on October 4, 2018, he retained the NWA World Historic Light Heavyweight Championship against Christopher Daniels. On October 19, Hechicero appeared for Pro Wrestling Guerrilla (PWG) at Smokey and the Bandido in Los Angeles, losing to Zack Sabre Jr.

At Maple Leaf Pro Wrestling (MLP)'s Multiverse pay-per-view on April 17, 2026, Hechicero successfully defended the CMLL World Heavyweight Championship against Jonathan Gresham.

=== New Japan Pro-Wrestling (2016–present) ===
In January 2016, Hechicero made his Japanese debut by taking part in the CMLL and New Japan Pro-Wrestling (NJPW) co-produced Fantastica Mania 2016 tour. Over the six-show tour, Hechicero competed in various multi-man matches, teaming with both CMLL and NJPW representatives. In January 2017, Hechicero took part in the Fantastica Mania 2017 tour, unsuccessfully challenging Máximo Sexy for the CMLL World Heavyweight Championship in the main event on January 21. Hechicero returned to NJPW in February 2023, taking part in the revived Fantastica Mania 2023 tour. At Lonestar Shootout on November 10, he teamed with Rocky Romero and Último Guerrero in a loss to Atlantis, Máscara Dorada and Tiger Mask. On August 30, 2024, at Capital Collision, Hechicero and Virus unsuccessfully challenged TMDK (Mikey Nicholls and Shane Haste) for the Strong Openweight Tag Team Championship. He lost to Zack Sabre Jr. at Battle in the Valley on January 11, 2025.

=== Ring of Honor (2016, 2019) ===
On October 29, 2016, Hechicero made his Ring of Honor (ROH) debut in Baltimore, where he teamed up with Okumura and Último Guerrero to compete in a tournament to determine the inaugural ROH World Six-Man Tag Team Champions. In the first round, the CMLL trio defeated The Addiction (Christopher Daniels and Frankie Kazarian) and Kamaitachi, but lost to The Kingdom (Matt Taven, T. K. O'Ryan and Vinny Marseglia) in the semi-finals. He returned at their Summer Supercard pay-per-view on August 9, 2019, teaming with Bárbaro Cavernario and Templario in a loss to Carístico, Soberano Jr. and Stuka Jr. During the second night of Global Wars Espectacular tour on September 7, 2019, he and Rey Bucanero unsuccessfully challenged The Briscoes (Jay Briscoe and Mark Briscoe) for the ROH World Tag Team Championship in a three-way match also involving The Bouncers (Brian Milonas and Beer City Bruiser).

=== All Elite Wrestling / Return to ROH (2024–present) ===
==== Sporadic appearances (2024–2025) ====
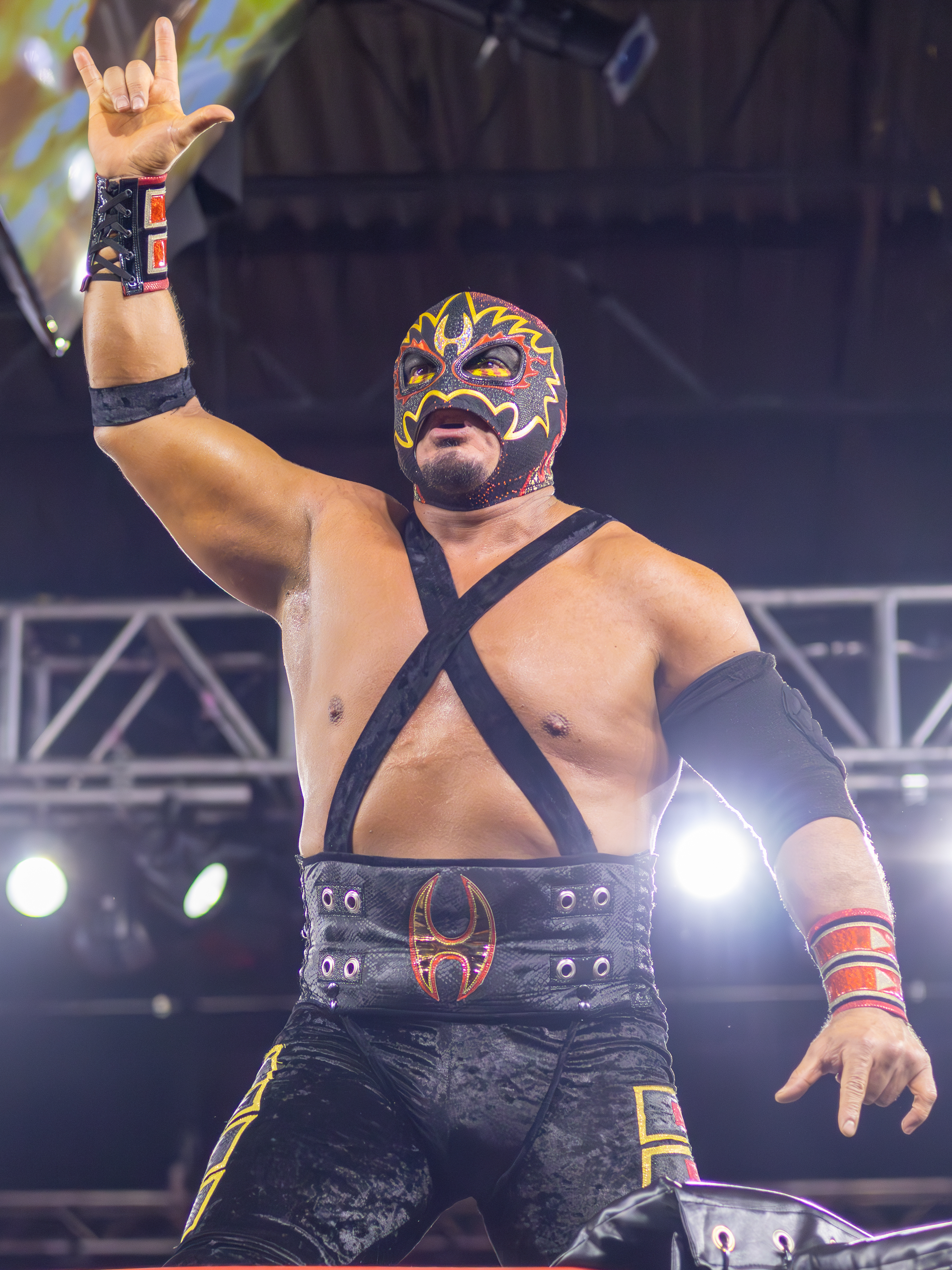
Hechicero at Death Before Dishonor in August 2025

In January 2024, it was announced Hechicero, Místico, Máscara Dorada and Volador Jr. would represent CMLL in American partner promotion All Elite Wrestling (AEW). The four men made their debut on the January 31 episode of Dynamite, appearing ringside during Jon Moxley's match against Jeff Hardy. After being taunted by Moxley during the match, the four men attacked him after his victory, before being chased off by Christopher Daniels, Matt Sydal, Angelo Parker and Matt Menard, whom they defeated in their AEW in-ring debut on the February 2 episode of Rampage. The following night on Collision, Hechicero made his AEW singles debut, facing Moxley's Blackpool Combat Club (BCC) stablemate, Bryan Danielson, in a losing effort. On June 30, at Forbidden Door, Hechicero was defeated by MJF.

On the February 20, 2025 episode of ROH Wrestling, Hechicero made his return to ROH, now the sister promotion of AEW, teaming with Bárbaro Cavernario and Soberano Jr. to defeat Dark Panther, Fuego and Sammy Guevara.

==== Don Callis Family (2025–present) ====
On June 4, at Collision: Fyter Fest, Hechicero teamed with the Don Callis Family's Protoshita (Konosuke Takeshita and Kyle Fletcher) to defeat Bandido and The Outrunners (Truth Magnum and Turbo Floyd). On June 10, Hechicero confirmed that he was now a member of the Don Callis Family. On July 17, it was reported that Hechicero had signed with AEW. At Death Before Dishonor on August 29, Hechicero unsuccessfully challenged Bandido for the ROH World Championship. On September 9, Hechicero confirmed in an interview with FOX Sports Mexico that he had signed a multi-year deal with AEW, while also keeping his contract with CMLL. At All Out on September 20, Hechicero teamed with stablemate Josh Alexander in a four-way ladder match for the AEW World Tag Team Championship, but failed to win.

On the January 10, 2026 episode of Collision, he unsuccessfully challenged Mark Briscoe for the AEW TNT Championship. Hechicero and his stablemates Andrade El Idolo and Lance Archer unsuccessfully challenged The Conglomeration (Kyle O'Reilly, Orange Cassidy and Roderick Strong) for the AEW World Trios Championship on the April 25 episode of Collision.

== Championships and accomplishments ==
Hechicero is a two-time CMLL World Heavyweight Champion.

- Alto Voltaje
  - Alto Voltaje Championship (1 time, current, inaugural)
  - Alto Voltaje Cup (2024)
- Consejo Mundial de Lucha Libre
  - CMLL World Heavyweight Championship (2 times)
  - NWA World Historic Light Heavyweight Championship (1 time)
  - CMLL World Trios Championship (1 time) – with Euforia and Mephisto
  - Leyenda de Azul (2023)
  - CMLL International Gran Prix (2026)
- Kaoz Lucha Libre
  - Kaoz Heavyweight Championship (1 time, inaugural)
- Poder Y Honor
  - PYH Heavyweight Championship (1 time, inaugural, final) (Note: While he has not lost the championship nor officially been stripped of it, the championship has not been defended since 2013)
- Pro Wrestling Illustrated
  - Faction of the Year (2025) as part of the Don Callis Family
  - Ranked No. 35 of the top 500 singles wrestlers in the PWI 500 in 2022
- Mexican Independent Promotions
  - WWA World Middleweight Championship (1 time) (Note: This was the Mexico City/Monterrey version of the championship.)

== Luchas de Apuestas record ==
Winner (wager)	Loser (wager)	Location	Event	Date	Notes
Rey Hechicero (mask)	Gitano del Norte (mask)	Monterrey, Nuevo León	Live event	September 9, 2007	
Rey Hechicero (mask)	Caifán Rockero I (mask)	Monterrey, Nuevo León	Primer Festival de Lucha Libre en Monterrey	March 21, 2010	
Hechicero (mask)	Euforia (mask)	Mexico City	CMLL 91st Anniversary Show	September 14, 2024	
