= El Gallo (wrestler) =

Mexican professional wrestler

Personal information
- Born: December 15, 1984 (age 41) Guadalajara, Jalisco, Mexico
- Children: Nuevo Titan (son); Maleni (daughter)
- Family: "El Líder" (Father); Ráfaga (Brother)

Professional wrestling career
- Ring name(s): Estrella de Jalisco I El Gallo
- Billed height: 172 cm (5 ft 8 in)
- Billed weight: 93 kg (205 lb)
- Trained by: Gran Cochisse
- Debut: January 5, 2005

El Gallo (born December 15, 1984, in Guadalajara, Jalisco, Mexico) is the ring name of a Mexican professional wrestler currently working for the Mexican promotion Consejo Mundial de Lucha Libre (CMLL). El Gallo is the son of luchador El Líder and the brother of CMLL wrestler Ráfaga. He is a former three-time Occidente Light Heavyweight Champion and currently holds the Occidente Tag Team Championship with Esfinge. El Gallo's real name is not a matter of public record, as is often the case with masked wrestlers in Mexico where their private lives are kept a secret from the wrestling fans. Originally he teamed up with his brother as "Estrella de Jalisco I", while his brother was known as "Estrella de Jalisco II", but changed his ring character to El Gallo in 2006. El Gallo is Spanish for "The Rooster", a name that is reflected in his mask, which is adorned by a Cockscomb and fabric wattles on his chin. In 2012 El Gallo began being accompanied to the ring by El Gallito ("Little Rooster") a Mini-Estrella mascota version of himself.

== Personal life ==
The wrestler who would later be known as El Gallo was born on December 15, 1984, in Guadalajara, Jalisco, Mexico, son of professional wrestler known under the ring name "El Líder". Growing up, the future El Gallo and his brother would often not see their father as he would be gone from Guadalajara for weeks at a time, wrestling in Mexico City. Growing up, he played football and was a big fan of professional wrestling, especially his father and Hijo del Santo. He has two children, Nuevo Titan and Maleni.

== Professional wrestling career ==
Originally he wrestled as the masked character "Estrella de Jalisco I" ("Star of Jalisco I"), working as a regular Tag team with his younger brother who worked as "Estrella de Jalisco II". The two worked mainly in and around Guadalajara while continuing their wrestling training under Gran Cochisse.

=== El Gallo (2006–present) ===
In 2006 he adopted a new ring character, a kid friendly tecnico (professional wrestling term for those that play the "good guys") character known as "El Gallo". The Gallo, or Rooster imagery was supported by his mask, complete with a fake Cockscomb on top of his head and fabric wattles dangling from his chin. Only a few months after becoming El Gallo he won his first major victory, defeating Güero Loco in a Luchas de Apuestas, or "bet match", forcing his opponent to unmask afterwards as per Lucha libre traditions. Six months later he teamed up with Tony Rivera to win a tag team Luchas de Apuestas match over Super Maquina and Conflictus. As a result of the match Super Maquina was unmasked and Conflictus had his hair shaved off as a result. The following year El Gallo unmasked yet another wrestler when he defeated Mach 1. On February 17, 2008, El Gallo, Misterioso Jr., La Sombra, Infierno, Damián 666, Toxico, Sagrado, Maléfico, Leon Blanco and Tony Rivera competed in a torneo cibernetico elimination match for the Occidente Light Heavyweight Championship, a local championship promoted by the Guadalajara branch of Consejo Mundial de Lucha Libre (CMLL). In the end Misterioso Jr. won the match and the title, but a storyline rivalry between Misterioso Jr. and El Gallo developed, which saw El Gallo win the championship the following week. El Gallo would subsequently defend the championship against Toxico, Damián 666 and Infierno before losing the title back to Misterioso Jr. on August 31, 2008. The following month El Gallo and El Hijo del Fantasma defeated CMLL trainer Máscara Mágica and Maléfico in a Luchas de Apuestas match, forcing Maléfico to unmask and the unmasked Máscara Mágica to be shaved bald after the match. His success in 2008 led to him being selected the Occidente ("western") luchador of the year by a fan vote, earning the first ever Salvador Lutteroth González y Fausto Rodríguez Romero award. In 2009 CMLL held Torneo Tanque Dantes, a tag team tournament specifically for teams who worked primarily in Guadalajara's Arena Coliseo and its associated wrestling training school. The tournament was named after Guadalajara native and wrestling pioneer Tanque (Tank) Alfonso Dantés. The teams were paired up specifically for the tournament and did not work together on a regular basis prior to it as El Gallo was teamed up with Boomerang for the tournament. In the end El Gallo and Boomerang ended up in second place, one point behind the winning team of Palacio Negro

On November 15, 2009, El Gallo was one of eight men who put their mask on the line in a Steel cage match where the last two men in the cage would have to fight to keep their mask safe. The match came down to El Gallo and El Egipico after Infierno, Magnum, Samurai, Neutron, Leon Blanco and El Gallo's brother Ráfaga escaped the cage. Originally it looked like El Gallo would have to unmask as he was pinned, but the local wrestling commissioner restarted the match as El Gallo had a foot under the bottom rope during the pinfall, making it void. In the end El Gallo pinned his opponent, forcing El Egipico to unmask. In May 2010 El Gallo was one of several wrestlers competing in a tournament for the vacant Occidente Light Heavyweight Championship, a tournament El Gallo won by defeating Rey Trueno, Drago, Maléfico and finally Mr. Trueno to win the championship for the second time. His reign was ended on October 3, 2010, when El Felino defeated him. El Gallo regained the championship on January 30, 2010, in the semi-main event of a show in Arena Coliseo. His third reign lasted until July 11, 2011, when Okumura defeated El Gallo to win the championship. On March 11, 2012, El Gallo would unmask El Bárbaro, a wrestler who would go on to become known as Bárbaro Cavernario Months later he would win the hair of Maléfico, a wrestler he unmasked years before. At some point in 2012 he gained a Mascota called "El Gallito" ("Little Rooster"), a Mini-Estrella version of himself, wearing an identical mask as he accompanied the regular sized El Gallo to the ring. On August 4, 2013, the team of El Gallo and Black Metal defeated Halcon de Plata and Leo and then Bárbaro Cavernario and Sadico to win the 2013 Copa Express: 2013. On January 14, 2014, El Gallo defeated Arkangel de la Muerte to win the FULL World Championship, a title that originated on Chile. He held the title for 156 days before Arkangel won the title back. In early 2015 CMLL held a tournament to determine the next challengers for the Occidente Tag Team Championship, pairing El Gallo up with semi-regular partner Esfinge for the tournament. In the first round the duo defeated Pitbull I and Pitbull II, in the second round they defeated Mr. Trueno and Rey Trueno and finally Exterminador and Malefico in the finals to earn a match for the championship. On February 28, 2015, Esfinge and El Gallo defeated Olímpico and Boby Zavala to win the championship. On May 12, 2015, they successfully defended the championship against the CMLL Arena Coliseo Tag Team Champions La Comando Caribeño (Misterioso Jr. and Sagrado). In May, 2015 El Gallo competed in a qualifying match for the 2015 version of En Busca de un Ídolo as one of 16 wrestlers in the qualifying torneo cibernetico, elimination match where the last eight wrestlers would qualify for the tournament. Gallo competed against Akuma, Blue Panther Jr., Cancerbero, Canelo Casas, Delta, Disturbio, Esfinge, Flyer, Guerrero Maya Jr., Joker, Pegasso, Raziel, Sagrado, Stigma and Boby Zavala. El Gallo was the eight and final competitor eliminated from the match.

== Championships and accomplishments ==
- Consejo Mundial de Lucha Libre

- Copa Express: 2013 - with Black Metal
- Occidente Light Heavyweight Championship (3 times)
- Occidente Tag Team Championship (1 time, current) - With Esfinge
- Occidente Luchador of the Year: 2008

- Federacion Universal de Lucha Libre

- FULL World Championship (1 time)

== Luchas de Apuestas record ==
Winner (wager)	Loser (wager)	Location	Event	Date	Notes
El Gallo (mask)	Güero Loco (mask)	Guadalajara, Jalisco	Live event	April 30, 2006	
El Gallo (mask) and Tony Rivera (hair)	Super Maquina (mask) and Conflictus (hair)	Guadalajara, Jalisco	Live event	November 5, 2006	
El Gallo (mask)	Mach 1 (Note: Not the same wrestler who worked as Mach 1 in 1997.) (mask)	Guadalajara, Jalisco	Live event	December 2, 2007	
El Gallo (mask) and El Hijo del Fantasma (mask)	Máscara Mágica (hair) and Maléfico (hair)	Guadalajara, Jalisco	Live event	September 28, 2008	
El Gallo (mask)	El Egipico (mask)	Guadalajara, Jalisco	Live event	November 15, 2009	(Note: They were the last two men in an eight-man Steel Cage match that also included León Blanco, Ráfaga, Neutrón, Samurai, Magnum and Infierno.)
El Gallo (mask)	El Bárbaro (mask)	Guadalajara, Jalisco	Live event	March 11, 2012	
El Gallo (mask)	Maléfico (hair)	Guadalajara, Jalisco	Live event	August 12, 2012	
