= En Busca de un Ídolo 2015 =

2015 Consejo Mundial de Lucha Libre event

- Logo of the 4th En Busca de un Ídolo tournament
- Promotion: Consejo Mundial de Lucha Libre
- Date: May 24, 2015-August 21, 2015
- City: Mexico City, Mexico
- Venue: Arena México
- Tagline: El Desafio / The Challenge

Event chronology
← Previous; Leyenda de Plata	Next → Sin Salida

En Busca de un Ídolo chronology
← Previous; 2014	Next → —

En Busca de un Ídolo 2015 ("In Search of an Idol 2015") was a professional wrestling tournament held by the Mexican Lucha Libre (professional wrestling) promotion Consejo Mundial de Lucha Libre (CMLL) from May through August, 2015. The qualifier took place on May 24, 2015 to determine which eight wrestlers would compete in the main portion of the show. This is the fourth time since 2012 that CMLL has held an En Busca de un Ídolo tournament, making it the fourth overall tournament under that name. All tournament matches took place in CMLL's main building, Arena México on Tuesday and Friday shows. Like the first 2012 and 2014 version of the tournament was devised to focus on a group of younger wrestlers trying to prove themselves to both CMLL and the fans. The first round of the tournament ran from June 5 to July 21 with Guerrero Maya Jr., Boby Zavala, Esfinge and Disturbio all qualifying for the second round. The second round ran from July 31 to August 14 and the finals of the tournament took place on August 21 with Zavala winning the tournament.

== Tournament Prize ==
The winner of the tournament will be given the opportunity to work on the 2016 Fantastica Mania show, an event co-promoted by CMLL and New Japan Pro-Wrestling (NJPW) that takes place in Japan once a year. Additional rewards have not yet been announced, previous years winners have also received championship matches, but that has not been verified for the 2015 tournament.

== Tournament format ==
The tournament will be split into three rounds, in the first round all eight wrestlers will face off in a Round-robin tournament, each wrestling seven matches split between CMLL Tuesday and Friday shows in Arena Mexico. Wrestlers will earn points based on their in ring result, judging and an online poll. The top four point earners will move on to round two. Round two is another round-robin tournament between the top four point earners. At the end of the round the top two wrestlers will face off in the finals of the tournament. All matches except the finals will be one fall with a 10-minute time limit, the finals will be a

== Point system ==
Wrestlers can earn points in one of three ways

- Match results

- 20 Points for a victory
- 10 Points for a draw
- 0 points for a loss

- Judging

- The tournament includes four judges, referee El Tirantes, wrestler Shocker, trainer Hijo del Gladiador and a fourth judge that would rotate from show to show. The judges can award up to 10 points each based on skills displayed, the way a wrestler portray their character, their personality, their charisma, and how much of a fan response they get during their matches.

- Online Poll

- The third way to earn points for the tournament is through an online poll conducted after each match on the En Busca de un Ídolo website. The online poll could give a wrestler a maximum of 40 additional points in the tournament each week.

== Participants ==
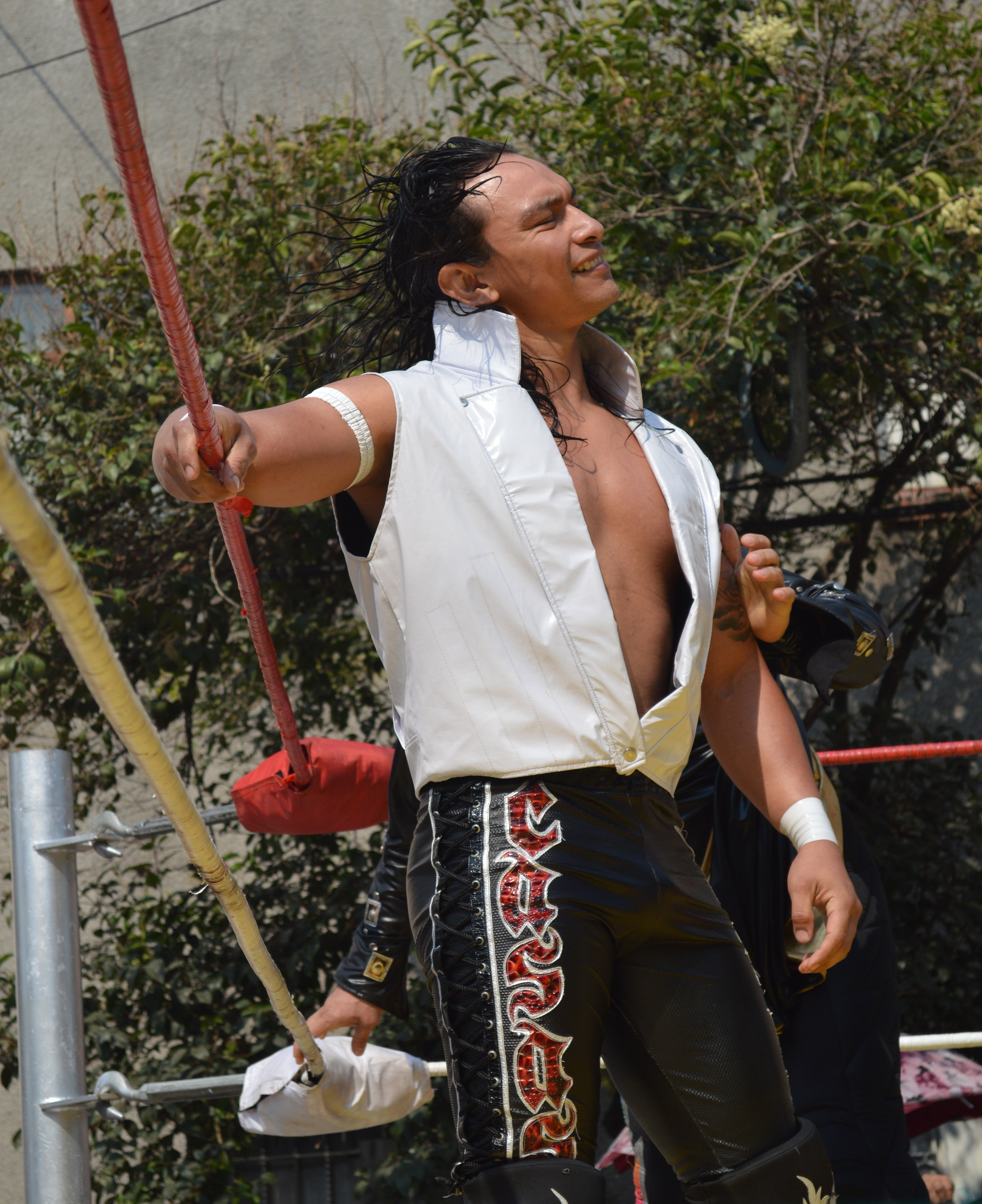
Canelo Casas, part of his uncle Negro Casas' team.

Team Negro Casas

- Blue Panther Jr.
- Canelo Casas
- Delta
- Guerrero Maya Jr.

Team Virus

- Boby Zavala
- Disturbio
- Esfinge
- Flyer

Judges

- Shocker
- Hijo del Gladiador
- El Tirantes
- 4th Judge changes from week to week

== Tournament qualifier ==
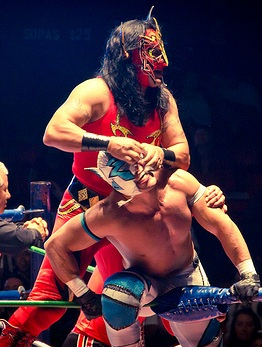
Delta (in front) qualified for the main portion of the tournament.

On May 24, 2015, 16 wrestlers competed in a torneo cibernetico elimination match, competing for eight spots in the main portion of the En Busca de un Ídolo tournament. The 16 wrestlers were Akuma, Blue Panther Jr., Cancerbero, Canelo Casas, Delta, Disturbio, Esfinge, Flyer, El Gallo, Guerrero Maya Jr., Joker, Pegasso, Raziel, Sagrado, Stigma and Boby Zavala. In the end Blue Panther Jr., Boby Zavala, Canelo Casas, Delta, Disturbio, Esfinge and Flyer, Guerrero Maya Jr. qualified for the main portion of the tournament.

#	Eliminated	Eliminated by	Source
1	Akuma	Joker	
2	Raziel	Guerrero Maya Jr.	
3	Joker	Pegasso	
4	Cancerbero	Delta	
5	Pegasso	Stigma	
6	Sagrado	Boby Zavala	
7	Stigma	Esfinge	
8	El Gallo	Canelo Casas	

== Round one ==
During the May 27, 2015 CMLL Informa show it was revealed that Negro Casas would be the trainer for Blue Panther Jr, Canelo Casas, Delta and Guerrero Maya Jr. while Virus would be the trainer for Zavala, Disturbio, Esfinge and Flyer. Three out of the four wrestlers on Virus' team were already in his wrestling class, adding Disturbio to the group. During the CMLL Informa episode the announcers pushed the storyline that Casas might have a harder time with his team, training the son of long time rival Blue Panther, Casas' nephew and the two most experienced wrestlers in the group who may not be as open to his input as a trainer. During the first round Guerrero Maya Jr. earned 100 points from winning five matches in total during the seven-week round-robin tournament, the most of any of the participants while Flyer only earned 30 points for one victory (over Blue Panther Jr.) and a draw against Canelo Casas, the least of any participant. Guerrero Maya Jr. was also the person to get the highest accumulated score from the judges, a total of 221 points, with Delta receiving the lowest collective score a total of 132 points. The online poll had Boby Zavala as the top point earner with 221 points and Blue Panther Jr as the lowest with only 53 points in total. While Flyer scored low both in matches and with the judges the fan polls were strongly in his favor during the last four weeks that it moved him into fifth position. Blue Panther Jr., who was already the lowest ranked competitor, did not work his final match of the first round, with CMLL claiming force majeure, replacing him in the match with Hechicero who wrestled against Delta but did not get any points. His no-show did not change his rankings as he could not possibly have ended higher than seventh place. For the last week of the first round it looked as if Flyer would be in third place as long as he got decent points from the judges due to his strong poll numbers, but he was forced to pull out of the match due to a foot injury. Due to this CMLL had Guerrero Maya Jr. wrestle against Tritón. By not scoring any points from the judges at all Flyer felt to fourth position. In the end Guerrero Maya Jr., Bobby Zavala, Esfinge and Disturbio all qualified for the second round. Between rounds trainer Negro Casas will team up with Guerrero Maya Jr. and Boby Zavala to take on Virus, Esfinge and Disturbio as part of the July 24 Super Viernes show.

Total points standing
Rank	Name	Match Points	Judges Points	Poll Points	Total points
1	Guerrero Maya Jr.	100	213	225	538
2	Bobby Zavala	70	221	242	533
3	Esfinge	80	197	116	393
4	Disturbio	60	193	138	391
5	Flyer	30	135	219	384
6	Carnelo Casas	80	181	61	322
7	Delta	80	165	60	305
8	Blue Panther Jr.	60	140	54	254

Match results
Round 1	Blue Panther Jr.	Boby Zavala	Canelo Casas	Delta	Disturbio	Esfinge	Flyer	Guerrero Maya Jr.	Total
Blue Panther Jr.	X	Blue Panther Jr.	Casas	Delta (Note: Blue Panther Jr. did not show up for his match, Delta fought Hechicero instead.)	Blue Panther Jr	Blue Panther Jr.	Flyer	Esfinge	60
Boby Zavala	Blue Panther Jr.	X	Draw	Delta	Disturbio	Zavala	Zavala	Zavala	70
Canelo Casas	Casas	Draw	X	Casas	Casas	Esfinge	Draw	Maya Jr.	80
Delta	Delta	Delta	Casas	X	Disturbio	Delta	Delta	Maya Jr.	80
Disturbio	Blue Panther Jr.	Disturbio	Casas	Disturbio	X	Esfinge	Disturbio	Maya Jr.	60
Esfinge	Blue Panther Jr.	Zavala	Esfinge	Delta	Esfinge	X	Esfinge	Esfinge	80
Flyer	Flyer	Zavala	Draw	Delta	Disturbio	Esfinge	X	Maya Jr. (Note: Due to a foot injury Flyer did not wrestle, he was replaced by Tritón.)	30
Guerrero Maya Jr.	Maya Jr.	Zavala	Maya Jr.	Maya Jr.	Maya Jr.	Esfinge	Maya Jr.	X	100
Total	60	70	80	80	60	80	30	100	X

Online Poll Points
Name	Wk 1	Wk 2	Wk 3	Wk 4	Wk 5	Wk 6	Wk 7	Total
Bobby Zavala	37	40	38	32	34	31	30	242
Guerrero Maya Jr.	39	36	40	39	39	14	18	225
Flyer	18	26	17	40	38	40	40	179
Disturbio	34	13	21	18	23	21	8	138
Esfinge	40	12	18	13	2	8	17	116
Carnelo Casas	5	4	16	18	11	6	1	61
Delta	4	2	15	12	10	12	5	60
Blue Panther Jr.	4	4	17	12	10	6	1	54

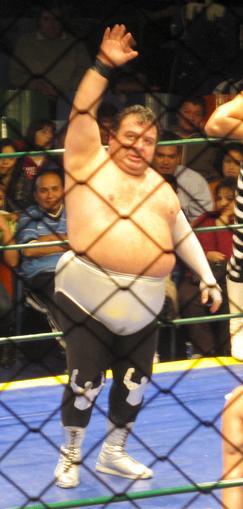
June 13 guest judge Brazo de Plata who gave everyone a "10"

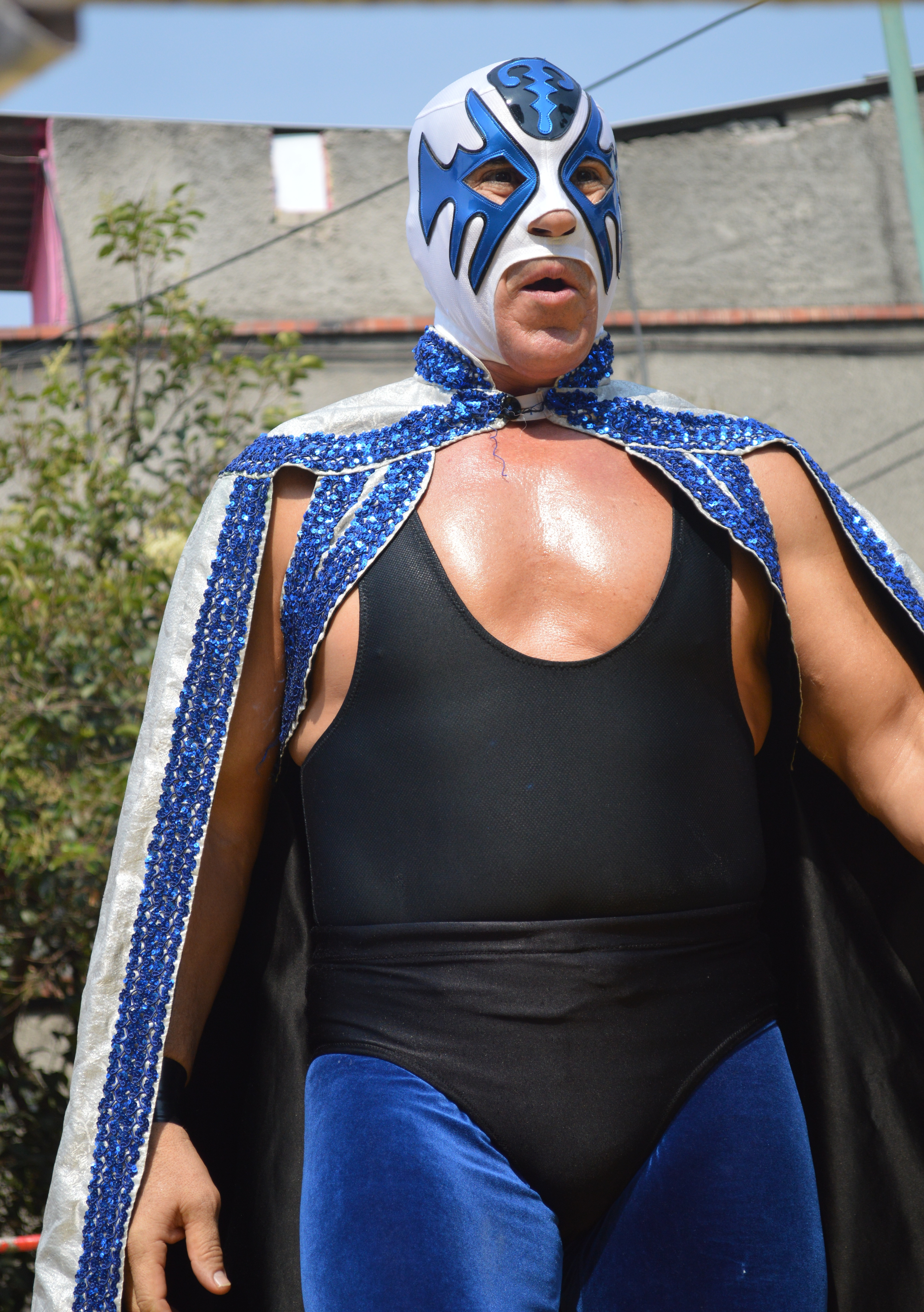
June 30 and July 21 guest judge Atlantis

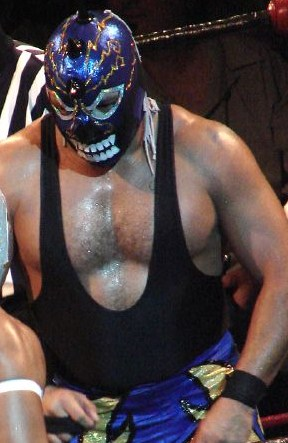
July 3 guest judge Mephisto

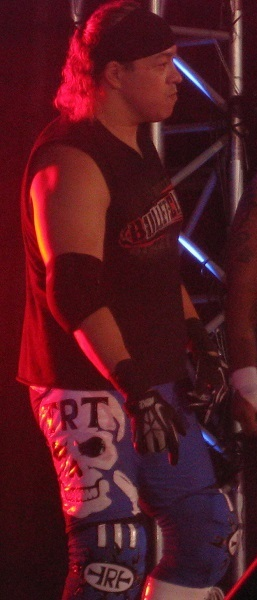
July 10 guest judge Rey Bucanero

Weekly Judge's Points breakdown
Week 1 - June 5, 2015
Wrestler	Tirantes	Hijo del Gladiador	Shocker	Máximo	Total
Boby Zavala	9	8	7	9	33
Delta	3	8	8	8	27
Guerrero Maya Jr.	4	7	7	8	26
Canelo Casas	3	7	6	7	23
Week 1 - June 9, 2015
Wrestler	Tirantes	Hijo del Gladiador	Shocker	La Sombra	Total
Disturbio	4	5	5	8 (Note: La Sombra later revealed that he meant to give Disturbio a 3 but grabbed the wrong point paddle.)	22
Esfinge	4	6	5	6	20
Blue Panther Jr.	3	5	6	4	18
Flyer	2	6	5	4	17
Week 2 - June 12, 2015
Wrestler	Tirantes	Hijo del Gladiador	Shocker	Último Guerrero	Total
Esfinge	10	8	8	6	32
Blue Panther Jr.	5	8	6	7	26
Disturbio	4	6	4	5	21
Flyer	3	6	5	4	18
Week 2 - June 16, 2015
Wrestler	Tirantes	Hijo del Gladiador	Shocker	Volador Jr.	Total
Boby Zavala	6	8	8	9	31
Guerrero Maya Jr.	6	8	8	5	27
Canelo Casas	3	6	7	6	22
Delta	2	6	6	6	20
Week 3 - June 19, 2015
Wrestler	Tirantes	Hijo del Gladiador	Shocker	Valiente	Total
Guerrero Maya Jr.	6	7	7	8	28
Disturbio	5	5	8	9	27
Esfinge	7	6	6	4	23
Delta	5	6	6	5	22
Week 3 - June 13, 2015
Wrestler	Tirantes	Hijo del Gladiador	Shocker	Brazo de Plata	Total
Boby Zavala	6	7	9	10	32
Canelo Casas	5	8	7	10	30
Blue Panther Jr.	5	6	8	10	29
Flyer	5	6	6	5	29
Week 4 - June 26, 2015
Wrestler	Tirantes	Hijo del Gladiador	Shocker	Blue Panther	Total
Boby Zavala	7	8	8	9	32
Flyer	4	8	8	8	28
Canelo Casas	6	7	6	8	27
Blue Panther Jr.	5	7	6	0 (Note: Blue Panther refused to pass judgment on his son and gave him no points.)	18
Week 4 - June 30, 2015
Wrestler	Tirantes	Hijo del Gladiador	El Felino (Note: Shocker was absent, no explanation given.)	Atlantis	Total
Esfinge	7	8	10	10	35
Guerrero Maya Jr.	7	8	8	9	32
Disturbio	6	7	10	9	32
Delta	5	7	1	9	22
Week 4 - July 3, 2015
Wrestler	Tirantes	Hijo del Gladiador	Mephisto	El Terrible	Total
Guerrero Maya Jr.	8	8	8	8	32
Delta	6	8	7	6	27
Canelo Casas	6	7	7	6	26
Disturbio	5	7	5	5	22
Week 5 - July 7, 2015
Wrestler	Tirantes	Hijo del Gladiador	Shocker	Ripper	Total
Boby Zavala	9	8	8	8	33
Esfinge	2	7	6	6	21
Blue Panther Jr.	5	6	5	4	20
Flyer	3	6	5	3	17
Week 6 - July 10, 2015
Wrestler	Tirantes	Hijo del Gladiador	Shocker	Rey Bucanero	Total
Boby Zavala	10	6	5	6	27
Canelo Casas	7	6	5	6	24
Delta	6	6	6	6	24
Flyer	5	6	6	6	23
Week 6 - July 14, 2015
Wrestler	Tirantes	Hijo del Gladiador	Shocker	La Amapola	Total
Disturbio	9	8	9	9	35
Guerrero Maya Jr.	7	8	8	9	32
Blue Panther Jr.	7	8	8	6	29
Esfinge	8	8	9	9	31
Week 7 - July 17, 2015
Wrestler	Tirantes	Hijo del Gladiador	Shocker	Diamante Azul	Total
Esfinge	8	8	8	10	34
Canelo Casas	8	7	7	7	29
Delta	6	6	5	6	23
Blue Panther Jr.	0	0	0	0	0
Week 7 - July 21, 2015
Wrestler	Tirantes	Hijo del Gladiador	Shocker	Atlantis	Total
Guerrero Maya Jr.	8	8	8	10	34
Disturbio	7	8	8	10	33
Boby Zavala	7	8	8	10	33
Flyer	0	0	0	0	0

== Round two ==
The second round of the tournament will run over three weeks, from July 31 through August 14 as Distrubio, Esfinge, Guerrero Maya Jr. and Boby Zavala will compete to qualify for the finals of the tournament.

Total points standing
Rank	Name	Match Points	Judges Points	Poll Points	Total points
1	Guerrro Maya Jr.	40	58	80	178
2	Boby Zavala	30	67	65	162
3	Esfinge	30	62	21	117
4	Disturbio	0	62	47	109

Match results
Round 2	Disturbio	Esfinge	Maya Jr.	Zavala	Total
Disturbio	X	Esfinge	Maya Jr.	Zavala	0
Esfinge	Esfinge	X	Maya Jr.	Draw	30
Guerrero Maya Jr.	Maya Jr.	Maya Jr.	X	Zavala	20
Boby Zavala	Zavala	Draw	Zavala	X	30
Total	0	30	20	30	X

Online Poll Points
Name	Wk 1	Wk 2	Total
Guerrero Maya Jr.	40	40	80
Boby Zavala	33	32	65
Disturbio	31	15	46
Esfinge	10	11	21

Weekly Judge's Points breakdown
Round 2 Week 1 - July 31, 2015
Wrestler	Tirantes	Hijo del Gladiador	Shocker	Estrellita	Total
Esfinge	8	8	9	10	35
Disturbio	7	8	9	9	33
Guerrero Maya Jr.	8	8	8	9	33
Boby Zavala	8	8	8	9	33
Round 2 Week 2 - August 7, 2015
Wrestler	Tirantes	Hijo del Gladiador	Valiente	La Máscara	Total
Boby Zavala	7	8	10	9	34
Esfinge	7	8	8	8	31
Disturbio	5	9	7	8	29
Guerrero Maya Jr.	5	7	7	6	25
Round 2 Week 3 - August 14, 2015
Wrestler	Tirantes	Hijo del Gladiador	Shocker	Volador Jr.	Total
Disturbio	8	7	8	9	32
Esfinge	0 (Note: El Titantes walked off without giving Esfinge points)	8	7	8	23
Guerrero Maya Jr.	9	7	8	8	32
Boby Zavala	9	8	8	9	34

== Finals ==
The finals took place on August 21, 2015, and saw Boby Zavala pin Guerrero Maya Jr. to win the match and the tournament. As a result, Zavala gets to not only travel to Japan for the 2016 Fantastica Mania show as well as a title match of his choice in the future.
