= Flyer (wrestler) =

Mexican professional wrestler

Personal information
- Born: October 3, 1994 (age 31) Monclova, Coahuila, Mexico
- Family: Ramón Ibarra Banda (Grandfather); Ramón Ibarra Rivera (Uncle); Adolfo Tapia Ibarra (Great Uncle); Eustacio Jiménez Ibarra (Great Uncle); Johnny Ibarra Banda (Great Uncle); Alejandro Tapia Ibarra (Great Uncle) "Desalmado" (Great Uncle); El Hijo de L.A. Park (Great-Uncle) "Extreme Boy" (Uncle) "Gemelo Muerte I" (Uncle); Ricardo Moreno Tapia (Uncle)
- Website: Facebook page

Professional wrestling career
- Ring name: Flyer
- Billed height: 176 cm (5 ft 9 in)
- Billed weight: 77 kg (170 lb)
- Trained by: Arturo Beristain; Volador Jr. Virus
- Debut: 2009

Flyer (born October 3, 1994, in Monclova, Coahuila, Mexico) is the ring name of a Mexican professional wrestler. He is the grandson of Ramón Ibarra Banda who has wrestled as "Volador" and "Super Parka" over the years and the nephew of Ramón Ibarra Rivera who has wrestled all over the world as "Volador Jr.". Flyer is best known for his work for the Mexican promotion Consejo Mundial de Lucha Libre (CMLL) as a técnico (professional wrestling term for those that portray the "good guys"). El Flyer's full birth name is not a matter of public record, as is often the case with masked wrestlers in Mexico where their private lives are kept a secret from the wrestling fans.

== Personal life ==
The man later known under the ring name Flyer was born on October 3, 1994, in Monclova, Coahuila, Mexico, as part of the Ibarra family which includes a large number of professional wrestlers. His Grandfather is Ramón Ibarra Banda who has worked both masked and unmasked as "Volador" and "Super Parka". it has not been revealed if Ibarra is his maternal or paternal Grandfather, but it has been revealed that he is the nephew of Ramón Ibarra Rivera who has wrestled on several continents as "Volador Jr". He is the Great Nephew of wrestler Adolfo Tapia Ibarra, better known as "La Parka" and the nephew of Tapia's son who wrestles as El Hijo de L.A. Park. He is the Great Nephew of Ramón Ibarra's brothers who also wrestled; Johnny Ibarra Banda, who worked as Jhony Ibarra, Alejandro Tapia Ibarra, better known as King Balam and an uncle who wrestled as "Desalmado". He is also related in some way to wrestlers Extreme Boy, Gemelo Muerte I and Gemelo Muerte II although the exactly relationship is unclear.

== Professional wrestling career ==
Flyer began training for a professional wrestling career at the age of 15, training at the local Consejo Mundial de Lucha Libre (CMLL) wrestling school in his native Guadalajara, initially training under Arturo Beristain but later also train with his uncle Volador Jr. as well as Virus. While training at the school he would occasionally fill-in for a match when a wrestler did not show and thus made his in-ring debut in 2009. While he trained in the CMLL school he was not signed with the company so when he began to wrestle on a regular basis he worked primarily on the independent circuit around Guadalajara. One of his early high-profile appearances was on November 19, 2011, where he teamed up with Aeroboy to work the Desastre Total Ultraviolento (DTU) 2nd Anniversary Show, competing in a tag team tournament. The duo defeated the teams of Ciclope and Slayer, and Dement Xtreme and Lancelot in the semi-finals and then go on to defeat the teams of Eterno and Pequeno Cobra, and Extreme Boy and Paranoiko to win the tournament. In late 2012 Flyer participated in CMLL's annual Bodybuilding contest, winning the beginners category. On January 21, 2014, Flyer won the Copa del Sol de Hidalgo as part of the Arena Aficion 62nd Anniversary celebration, defeating Maldito Jr. in the finals.

=== Consejo Mundial de Lucha Libre (2014–2023) ===
Flyer was introduced as part of CMLL's Generacion 2014 alongside Black Panther, Cachorro, Dragon Lee, Espiritu Negro, Hechicero, El Rebelde and Star Jr., a group of wrestlers making their CMLL debut around the turn of the year. Flyer's first official match for CMLL took place on January 13 where he teamed with Camaleón and Tigre Rojo Jr., losing to the trio of Canelo Casas, Espiritu Negro and Fuerza Chicana. On March 23, 2014, Flyer was one of 16 wrestlers who was given an opportunity to qualify for the 2014 En Busca de un Ídolo ("In Search of an Idol") tournament by competing in a torneo cibernetico elimination match. Flyer, alongside Black Panther, Canelo Casas, El Rebelde, Espiritu Negro, Herodes Jr., Metálico and Oro Jr. were all eliminated from the tournament. On April 18, 2014, he made his debut on CMLL's Friday night Super Viernes show in Arena Mexico, CMLL's main weekly show. In May, 2015 Flyer competed in a qualifying match for the 2015 version of En Busca de un Ídolo as one of 16 wrestlers in the qualifying torneo cibernetico elimination match where the last eight wrestlers would qualify for the tournament. Flyer had another chance to qualify for the tournament, competing against Akuma, Blue Panther Jr., Cancerbero, Canelo Casas, Delta, Disturbio, Esfinge, El Gallo, Guerrero Maya Jr., Joker, Pegasso, Raziel, Sagrado, Stigma and Boby Zavala. In the end Flyer was one of the eight survivors and thus qualified for the main portion of the tournament. During the first round all eight competitors faced off in a round-robin tournament with Flyer defeating Blue Panther Jr. and went to a double count out against Canelo Casas to earn just 30 points from matches, the lowest score of any of the eight competitors. The four judges were also harsh in their critique of Flyer giving him a total of 135, an average score of 4.8 over the 7 rounds, the lowest of any of the eight competitors. Despite his lack of in-ring success and bad feedback the public polls points carried him out of last place, giving him the maximum 40 points in weeks four, five and seven and 38 points in week six. Before the final match Flyer was positioned to advance in the tournament as long as he got more than 10 points from the judges, but before the final match against Guerrero Maya Jr. Flyer announced that he had suffered a foot injury and had to miss the match. As a result, he got zero points from the judges, ending up in fifth place, 8 points behind number 4 Disturbio and thus was eliminated from the tournament.

Flyer's last match for CMLL was on September 10, 2023.

== Championships and accomplishments ==
- Consejo Mundial de Lucha Libre
  - Mexican National Tag Team Championship (1 time) – with Atlantis Jr.
  - Mexican National Tag Team Title Tournament (2020) – with Atlantis Jr .
  - Torneo Gran Alternativa 2018 – with Volador Jr.

- CMLL Body Building: 2012 (Beginners category)

- Desastre Total Ultraviolento

- DTU Tornejo de Parejas - with Aeroboy

- Mexican Independent Circuit

- La Copa del Sol del Hidalgo

- Pro Wrestling Illustrated
  - Ranked No. 344 of the top 500 singles wrestlers in the PWI 500 in 2021
