= El Sagrado =

Mexican professional wrestler

Personal information
- Born: June 19, 1980 (age 46) Monterrey, Nuevo León, Mexico

Professional wrestling career
- Billed height: 1.77 m (5 ft 9 1/2 in)
- Billed weight: 90 kg (198 lb)
- Billed from: Monterrey, Nuevo León, Mexico
- Trained by: Chucho Villa, Flash I Diablo Velazco; Satánico
- Debut: June 8, 2003

El Sagrado (born June 19, 1980) is a Mexican professional wrestler best known for working for the Mexican promotion Consejo Mundial de Lucha Libre (CMLL). His ring name is Spanish for "The Sacred One". Working as "Sagrado" won the CMLL Arena Coliseo Tag Team Championship with Misterioso, Jr. as well as having formerly held the Mexican National Trios Championship twice, with different partners as well as the Occidente Light Heavyweight Championship on one occasion.

Like many children in Mexico, El Sagrado grew up idolizing the professional wrestling, especially El Santo. At the age of 12 he told his parents he wanted to become a professional wrestler, something his parents opposed. The young Sagrado found a way to train to become a professional wrestler without his parents knowing it, his brothers covered for him by telling his parents that he was at football practice instead. One of his younger brothers became a professional wrestler as well, using the ring name "Metatron".

Besides wrestling Sagrado also studied religion, urged by his mother to seek the priesthood when he was old enough. According to Sagrado he met Fray Tormenta, the famous Mexican wrestling priest who told him to follow his own desires, which in turn led him to become a professional wrestler. Whether this is actually true or part of the storyline build up around the "El Sagrado" character is not known, but Sagrado has stated that he met Fray Tormenta in several interviews.

== Professional wrestling career ==
Sagrado made his debut in 2000, at the age of 20, working under a mask. On his debut sacred shared a ring with one of the big names of the early 1990s, Rayo de Jalisco, Jr. and faced off against Carmelo Reyes. sacred wrestled mainly in the Monterrey Nuevoleon area where his family had moved a couple of years before. In early 2003 as part of "Consejo Mundial de Lucha Libre (CMLL)

=== El Sagrado ===
Sagrado showing in the contest earned him a new character and a promotional push by CMLL. They gave him the name "El Sagrado", a new outfit including a mask with a silver cross on it and a storyline that claimed that he was the protégé of Fray Tormenta. After a strong debut sacred soon found him lower in the cards, mainly because he did not meet the high expectations wrestling wise. Sacred himself claims that he was extremely nervous early on in his "El Sagrado" run and thus often failed to perform high risk moves correctly. In 2004 CMLL decided to quietly ignore El Sagrado's links to Fray Tormenta and introduce a new "Protégé of Fray Tormenta", Místico. Místico went on to become one of the biggest stars not just in Lucha libre but in wrestling. After finally get over his nerves and with further training El Sagrado began rising up the ranks again by 2005.

On October 7, 2005, Sagrado teamed up with Máximo and El Texano, Jr. to win the Mexican National Trios Championship from Pandilla Guerrera ("Gang of Warriors"; Doctor X, Nitro and Sangre Azteca). The trio defended the title five times including several defenses against various Pandilla Guerrera combinations of Doctor X, Nitro, Sangre Azteca, Arkangel de la Muerte and Misterioso, Jr. On April 24, 2007, the team lost the Mexican National Trios Championship to Los Perros del Mal (Damián 666, Halloween and Mr. Águila) when Texano, Jr. turned on his teammates and joined Los Perros del Mal. On June 10, 2007, Sagrado teamed with Rayman to defeat Los Junior Capos (Hijo de Cien Caras and Cien Caras, Jr.) to win the Occidente (Western) Tag Team Championship. On August 18, 2007, Sagrado became a double champion as he teamed up with Volador Jr. and La Sombra to defeat Los Perros del Mal for the Mexican National Trios Championship. Sagrado's time as double champion lasted over a year, until Texano, Jr. and El Terrible defeated Sagrado and Rayman to win the Occidente Tag Team Championship. The trio of Sagrado, Volador Jr. and La Sombra held the Mexican Trios title for 540 days, defending the title six times in that timeframe. On February 3, 2009, the newly formed Poder Mexica (Sangre Azteca, Black Warrior and Dragón Rojo, Jr.) won the titles from Sagrado's team. On July 11, 2012, El Sagrado defeated Okumura to win the Occidente Light Heavyweight Championship. On December 28, 2012, Sagrada lost the championship to Rafaga.

==== La Comando Caribeño ====
In 2015 Sagrado turned rudo and adopted a darker persona and ring gear, replacing the bright cross imagery with darker burning cross symbols on his mask and tights. In later 2014 he began to team regularly with the newest version of Comandante Pierroth and Misterioso, Jr. to form a group called La Comando Caribeño ("The Caribbean Commando"), adopting a storyline allegiance to Puerto Rico. In early 2015 La Comando began a storyline rivalry with the team of Delta and Guerrero Maya, Jr. over the CMLL Arena Coliseo Tag Team Championship. On February 28, 2015, Misterioso, Jr. and Sagrado defeated Delta and Guerrero Maya, Jr. to win the championship. In May, 2015 Sagrado competed in a qualifying match for the 2015 version of En Busca de un Ídolo, being one of 16 wrestlers competing in the qualifying torneo cibernetico, elimination match where the last eight wrestlers would qualify for the tournament. He competed against Akuma, Blue Panther Jr., Cancerbero, Canelo Casas, Delta, Disturbio, Esfinge, Flyer, El Gallo, Guerrero Maya Jr., Joker, Pegasso, Raziel, Stigma and Boby Zavala. He was the fifth man eliminated from the match, pinned by Boby Zavala.

== Championships and accomplishments ==
- Consejo Mundial de Lucha Libre
  - Mexican National Heavyweight Championship (1 time)
  - CMLL World Trios Championship (1 time) - with Gemelo Diablo I and II
  - CMLL Arena Coliseo Tag Team Championship (1 time) - with Misterioso Jr.

- Mexican National Trios Championship (2 times) – with Máximo and El Texano, Jr. (1) and Volador Jr. and La Sombra (1)

- CMLL Guadalajara
  - Occidente Light Heavyweight Championship (1 time)

- Occidente Tag Team Championship (1 time) – with Rayman

- Pro Wrestling Illustrated

- PWI ranked him #209 of the 500 best singles wrestlers of the PWI 500 in 2008

== Luchas de Apuestas record ==
El Sagrado (mask)	Mascara Magica (hair)	Guadalajara, Jalisco	Live event	February 17, 2007
