= Blue Panther Jr. =

Mexican professional wrestler

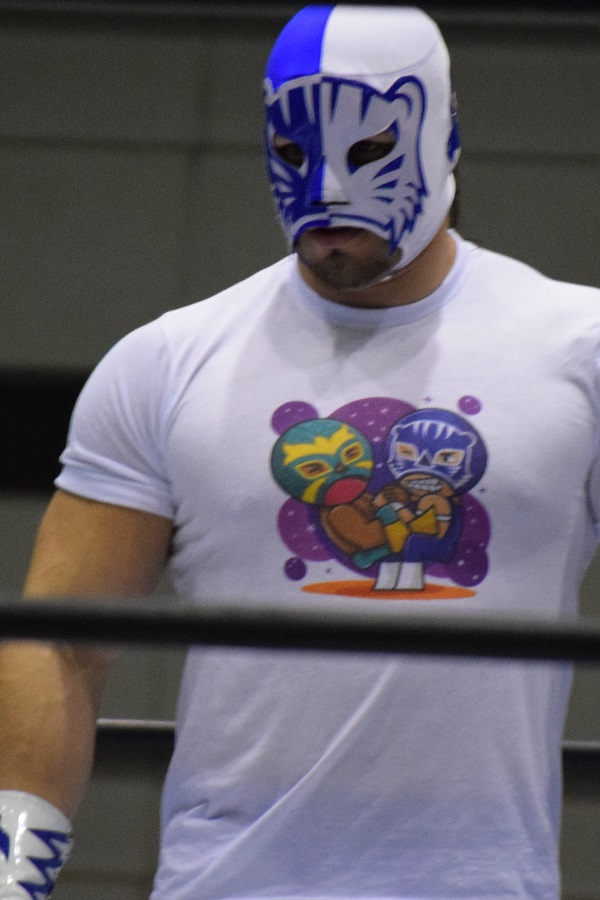
- Blue Panther Jr. in January 2017

Personal information
- Family: Blue Panther (father); Black Panther (brother); Chachorro Lagunero (brother)

Professional wrestling career
- Ring name(s): Black Panther; Black Silver; Blue Panther Jr.
- Billed height: 1.80 m (5 ft 11 in)
- Billed weight: 100 kg (220 lb)
- Trained by: Blue Panther; Franco Colombo; El Solar; Último Guerrero; Virus
- Debut: December 29, 2013

Blue Panther Jr. is the ring name of a Mexican professional wrestler, formerly known as Black Panther. He is working for the Mexican promotion Consejo Mundial de Lucha Libre (CMLL) portraying a tecnico ("Good guy") wrestling character. Blue Panther Jr's real name is not a matter of public record, as is often the case with masked wrestlers in Mexico where their private lives are kept a secret from the wrestling fans. He is the son of Genaro Vazquez Nevarez, better known as Blue Panther, and the older brother of wrestler The Panther.

== Personal life ==
Black Panther is the oldest son of professional wrestler Genaro Vazquez Nevarez, better known under the ring name Blue Panther and brother of masked wrestler The Panther. His full given name is not a matter of public record in accordance with Lucha Libre traditions where the true identities of masked wrestlers are kept private whenever possible. Both of Nevarez' sons were featured in interviews around their father well before they became professional wrestlers, but their names were never explicitly stated and they always wore the same Blue Panther mask that their father used to conceal their identifies and that of the then masked Nevarez. During interviews they were referred to as "Blue Panther Jr." and "Hijo de Blue Panther", but neither of the sons ever officially used that name. In April 2020 a younger brother was introduced to the wrestling world, using the ring name Chachoro Lagunero, "The Lagunero Puppy", wearing a version of his father's Blue Panther mask design. He is the cousin of Jesus Toral López, better known as Black Warrior, a long time wrestler who at one point also wrestled as "Black Panther"

== Professional wrestling career ==
Up until 2013 Black Panther was depicted in interviews as "Blue Panther Jr." or referred to simply as "the Son of Blue Panther". He was introduced as "Black Panther" while wearing a black and blue version of his father's Panther themed mask during a show to honor his father's 35th anniversary as a wrestler in late 2013. At the time his young brother was also introduced to the wrestling world as Cachorro with a similar mask, but no announcement of their debut date was given at the time. Black Panther made his debut on December 29, 2013, at a local show in Guadalajara, teaming with local wrestler Virgo to defeat the team of Rey Trueno and Mr. Trueno.

Black Panther participated in Consejo Mundial de Lucha Libre's 2014 La Copa Junior on January 1, 2014. La Copa Junior is a tournament exclusively for second or third-generation wrestlers competing in a torneo cibernetico elimination match. Black Panther and Chachorro were on the rudo ("Bad guy") team to even out the numbers between the two sides, but were promoted as ''tecnicos ("Good guys") subsequently. Black Panther did not eliminate any opponents during the match and was the fifth overall eliminated when he was pinned by Stigma. Following the La Copa Junior match Black Panther and Cachorro stated to team up with their father for trios (six-man) tag team matches, with the team billed as Los Divinos Laguneros ("The divine from the Lagoon", referencing their home region). They soon began a storyline rivalry with La Dinastia Casas ("The Casas Dynasty"; El Felino and his two sons Tiger and Puma), which was a continuation of a long running storyline between Blue Panther and the Casas family. Black Panther entered the 2014 Torneo Gran Alternativa ("Great Alternative") tournament, an annual a tag team tournament that has a wrestling rookie team up with an experienced wrestler for the tournament to help showcase younger wrestlers. Black Panther was teamed up with veteran wrestler Diamante Azul to participate in qualifying Block B where they lost to eventual tournament winners Cavernario and Mr. Niebla in the first round. Black Panther was one of 16 wrestlers competing in a tornero cibernetico match for one of eight spots in CMLL's 2014 En Busca de un Ídolo ("In search of an idol") tournament, but was eliminated. Black Panther, Cachorro, and Blue Panther competed in a one night Cuadrangular de Tercias (Trios four-way) tournament against the teams of Los Guerreros Laguneros (Euforia, Gran Guerrero, and Último Guerrero), El Cuatrero, Sanson, and Universo 2000 and the team of Atlantis, Diamante Azul, and Titán. The team lost to Los Guerreros, but defeated Universo 2000 and his two sons to take third place in the tournament.

=== Blue Panther Jr. (2014–present) ===
During a press conference on November 19 Black Panther announced that he was changing his ring name to "Blue Panther Jr." and adopting a new mask as well. At the same press conference Cachorro announced he was taking the name The Panther. In May, 2015 Blue Panther Jr. participated in a qualifying match for the 2015 version of En Busca de un Ídolo as one of 16 wrestlers in the qualifying torneo cibernetico elimination match where the last eight wrestlers would qualify for the tournament. He competed against Akuma, Cancerbero, Canelo Casas, Delta, Disturbio, Esfinge, Flyer, El Gallo, Guerrero Maya Jr., Joker, Pegasso, Raziel, Sagrado, Stigma and Boby Zavala. Panther Jr. was one of the eight survivors and qualified for the main portion of the tournament. During the En Busca de un Ídolo the wrestlers would face off in a round-robin first round earning points based on the outcome. After the match each wrestler would receive critique and points from a four man judging panel rating them on the match they just saw. Finally all wrestlers would be given additional points from a weekly online poll open to fans. During the first round Blue Panther Jr. defeated Disturbio and Esfinge, but lost to Boby Zavala, Canelo Casas, Flyer and Guerrero Maya Jr. The judges were often critical of Blue Panther Jr.'s performance giving him between 18 points (an average of 4.5 points per judge) and 29 points (an average of 7 points per judge). On the June 26 round his father Blue Panther was the special guest of the week, stating that he would not evaluate his son he instead gave him a "0". Blue Panther Jr. was slated to face Delta in his final 1st round match, slated to take place on the 2015 Sin Salida show on July 17, 2015. On the night Blue Panther Jr. did not show up for the match, with CMLL citing force majeure as the official explanation, replacing him with Hechicero for the match. With his absence Blue Panther Jr. got zero points from the judges, cementing his position as eighth and last of all the En Busca de un Idolo participants. On December 25, 2015 as part of CMLL's annual Infierno en el Ring show Blue Panther Jr. was one of twelve men risking their mask in the main event steel cage match. He was the seventh man to leave the cage, keeping his mask safe in the process. The match was won by Blue Panther Jr.'s younger brother The Panther as he unmasked Súper Comando. In January 2017, Blue Panther Jr. made his Japanese debut by taking part in Fantastica Mania 2017, the annual tour co-produced by CMLL and New Japan Pro-Wrestling (NJPW).
