= Pegasso =

Mexican professional wrestler

Personal information
- Born: February 25, 1978 (age 48) Puebla, Puebla, Mexico

Professional wrestling career
- Ring name(s): Hombre sin Nombre; Pegasso; Pegasso Xtreme
- Billed height: 1.70 m (5 ft 7 in)
- Billed weight: 76 kg (168 lb)
- Billed from: Puebla, Puebla
- Trained by: Gran Apache; Sombra Salvaje; Irasu; Califa; El Perverso; Satanico; Franco Colombo
- Debut: April 30, 1999

Christian Saldaña (born February 25, 1978), better known by the ring name Pegasso, is a Mexican professional wrestler, working for the Mexican promotion Consejo Mundial de Lucha Libre (CMLL). Pegasso worked from Asistencia Asesoría y Administración (AAA) from 2000 until 2008, where he was a part of the wrestling stable Real Fuerza Aérea. Pegasso's real name was not a matter of public record - as is often the case with masked wrestlers in Mexico where their private lives are kept a secret from the wrestling fans - until domestic violence allegations were made against him in 2025. The name Pegasso is Spanish for Pegasus, a winged horse from the Greek mythology. He has also wrestled as "Hombre sin Nombre" ("man without name") and "Pegasso Xtreme".

== Professional wrestling career ==
The wrestler who would later be best known as Pegasso made his professional wrestling debut on April 30, 1999, after training under Sombra Salvaje, Irasu and Califa. Initially he wrestled under the name Hombre sin Nombre (Spanish for "the man with no name"), a concept often used by Luchadors who have yet to establish a ring persona.

=== Asistencia Asesoría y Administración ===
In 2000 he began working for Asistencia Asesoría y Administración (AAA), one of Mexico's largest promotions, and was given a new ring persona named Pegasso, after the mythological horse. Initially Pegasso worked low card matches while training with AAA's head trainer Gran Apache. Pegasso wrestled on his first major show not long after signing on with AAA as he teamed with Oscar Sevilla, Path Finder and Ludxor to defeat Gran Apache, Angel Mortal, Marabunta and Mr. Condor on the undercard of the 2000 Verano de Escandalo pay-per-view event. Over the following years Pegasso made very few wrestling appearances while working with Gran Apache and other AAA trainees to improve his skills. It was not until 2006 that Pegasso began making regular appearances for AAA as he became part of a group of young high fliers called Real Fuerza Aérea in 2006. Together with Super Fly, Pegasso qualified for the finals of a tournament to crown the inaugural AAA World Tag Team Champions at the 2007 Rey de Reyes show. The match was a four corners elimination match that also included Guapos VIP (Alan Stone and Zumbido), The Mexican Powers (Crazy Boy and Joe Líder) and winners The Black Family (Dark Cuervo and Dark Ozz). Pegasso participated in the 2007 Alas de Oro but was eliminated fourth, by his own teammate Super Fly. Following the Alas de Oro Pegasso made fewer and fewer high-profile appearances for AAA, at best working the undercard of the 2008 Reina de Reinas tournament as Real Fuerza Aérea (Pegasso, Aero Star, Gato Eveready and El Ángel) lost to Los Piratas (Pirata Morgan, Pirata Morgan, Jr. El Hijo de Pirata Morgan and Barba Roja). By late 2008 Pegasso and fellow Real Fuerza Aérea member Rey Cometa left AAA. Initially the two worked for International Wrestling Revolution Group (IWRG) as Real Fuerza Aérea but soon after began working for Consejo Mundial de Lucha Libre (CMLL), Mexico's largest and oldest wrestling promotion.

=== Consejo Mundial de Lucha Libre ===
Pegasso and Rey Cometa initially used the Real Fuerza Aérea name in CMLL as well, but quickly abandoned it when AAA objected to the use of the name. When signing with CMLL Pegasso received further training by CMLL head trainers Satánico and Franco Columbo. Pegasso and Rey Cometa formed a regular team in CMLL, often working the lower end of the card. On April 7, 2009, Pegasso was one of 10 men competing for the vacant CMLL World Super Lightweight Championship but he was eliminated halfway through the match with the title going to Máscara Dorada instead. On October 18, 2009, Pegasso was one of 12 wrestlers who put his mask on the line in a 12-man Luchas de Apuestas cage match. He was the fourth person to escape the cage keeping his mask safe. Pegasso teamed with Rey Cometa and Rouge to defeat Los Guerreros Tuareg (Hooligan, Skándalo and Loco Max) in the opening match of CMLL's year end show, Sin Salida, with Pegasso scoring the deciding fall. In May, 2015 Pegasso competed in a qualifying match for the 2015 version of En Busca de un Ídolo as one of 16 wrestlers in the qualifying torneo cibernetico, elimination match where the last eight wrestlers would qualify for the tournament. He competed against Akuma, Blue Panther Jr., Cancerbero, Canelo Casas, Delta, Disturbio, Esfinge, Flyer, El Gallo, Guerrero Maya Jr., Joker, Raziel, Sagrado, Stigma and Boby Zavala. Pegasso pinned Joker during the match but ended up as the fifth man eliminated when he was pinned by Stigma. On December 25, 2015, as part of CMLL's annual Infierno en el Ring show Pegasso was one of twelve men risking their mask in the main event steel cage match. He was the third man to leave the cage, keeping his mask safe in the process.

== Multiple Pegassos ==
Pegasso is not the only Luchador to have used the name Pegasso. Two other luchadors have used a similar name in their: Pegaso who now works as Ciclón Ramírez and Pegaso (II) who is a former CMLL employee of little note.

== Personal life ==
Pegasso also works as a police officer.

On October 6, 2025, testimony from family members revealed a domestic violence case, claiming that Pegasso (exposing his real name as Christian Saldaña) had beaten his son "almost to death" for refusing to waive child support payments. This specifically stemmed from an April 2024 incident, wherein his son was hospitalized with injuries that confined him to a wheelchair and nearly lost him an eye. On October 22, 2025, the Puebla police department Saldaña was attached to claimed the accusations were being investigated by Internal Affairs. On November 19, 2025, Saldaña's hearing took place. On March 25, 2026, he was officially suspended by the police department.

== Championships and accomplishments ==
- Consejo Mundial de Lucha Libre
  - Torneo Cinco de Mayo (2023)
