= Canelo Casas =

Mexican professional wrestler

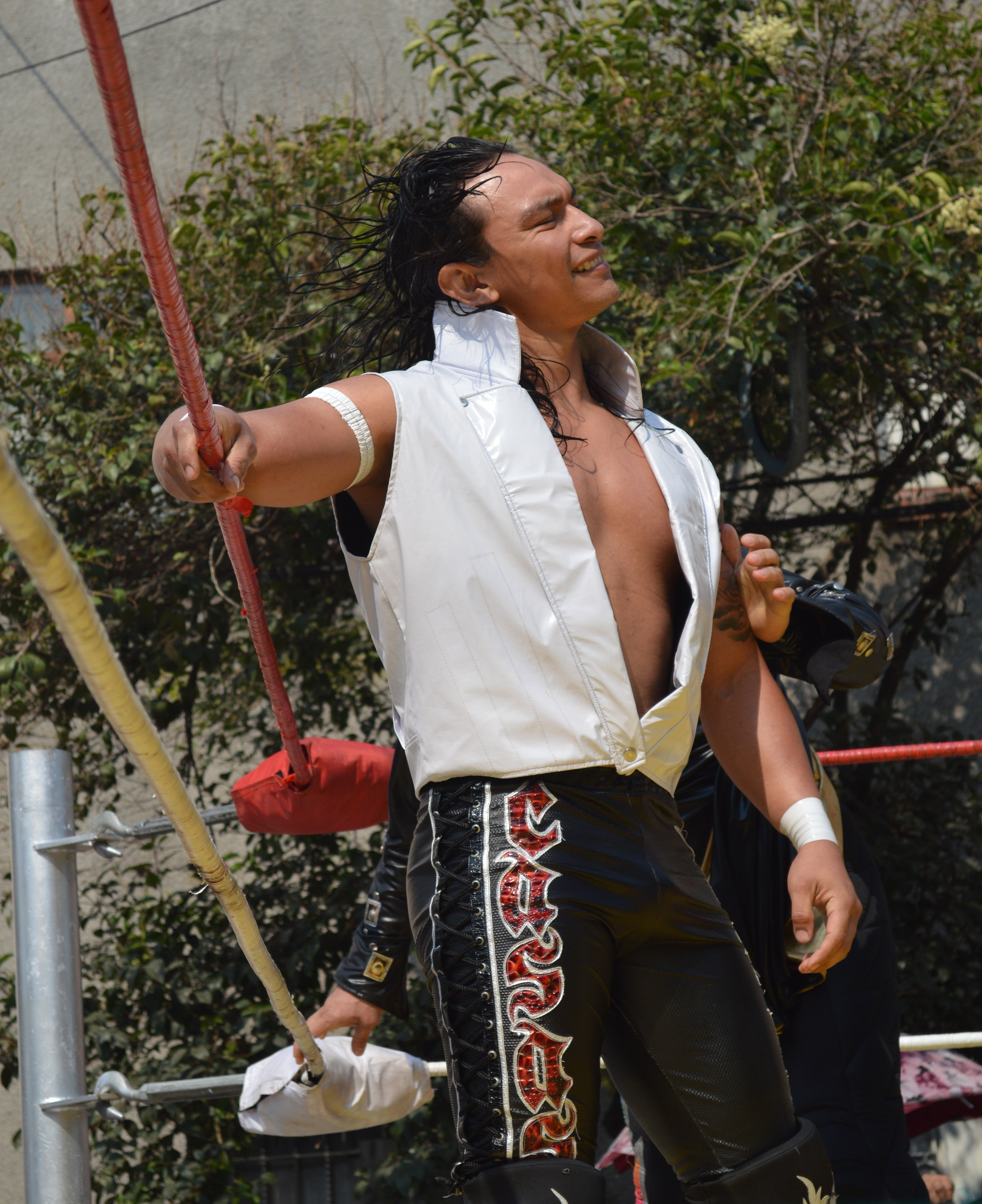
- Canelo Casas at an outdoor wrestling event

Personal information
- Born: 1982 (age 43–44) Mexico City, Mexico
- Family: Casas

Professional wrestling career
- Ring names: Bengala; Canelo Casas, Jr.; Canelo Casas
- Billed height: 185 cm (6 ft 1 in)
- Billed weight: 80 kg (176 lb)
- Trained by: Arturo Beristain; Franco Colombo; Ringo Mendoza; Hijo del Santo; Negro Casas; Pepe Casas; Arkangel de la Muerte
- Debut: March 6, 2006

Canelo Casas (born 1982 in Mexico City, Mexico, currently residing in Cuernavaca, Morelos) is the ring name of a Mexican professional wrestler currently working for the Mexican promotion Consejo Mundial de Lucha Libre (CMLL) portraying a rudo ("Bad guy") wrestling character. His birth name has not been revealed, but he is a member of the extensive Casas wrestling family and a third-generation wrestler, being the grandson of wrestler-turned-referee Pepe Casas and the nephew of Negro Casas, El Felino and Heavy Metal. Heavy Metal originally wrestled as Canelo Casas, but this Casas claims to not be a son but a nephew of the original Canelo Casas. He has previously worked as the masked character "Bengala" as well as "Canelo Casas, Jr."

== Personal life ==
Casas was born in 1982 in Mexico City, Mexico as part of the extensive "Casas wrestling family". His grand father is José Casas Granados, better known under the ring name Pepe Casas. While he uses the same ring name that Erick Casas (best known as "Heavy Metal") he claims that Erick is not his father but his uncle. His father, who is not a wrestler, is a sibling of Erick, José (best known as Negro Casas) and Jorge (known as El Felino) Casas. His cousins, sons of Jorge Casas, compete in Consejo Mundial de Lucha Libre (CMLL) under the ring names Tiger and Puma, two enmascarados, or masked wrestlers. He is the nephew of retired wrestler Princesa Blanca and active CMLL women's wrestler Dalys la Caribeña. Casas received extensive training from both his grandfather Pepe and his uncle José Casa before his in-ring debut.

== Professional wrestling career ==
Casas began his in-ring career on March 6, 2006 when he began working under a mask as the character "Bengala", keeping the fact that he was part of the Casas family from the general public. Later on he began working as Canelo Casas Jr., leading people to speculate that he was the son of the original Canelo Casas, Erick Casas. Due to the confusion he shortened his ring name to simply "Canelo Casas", in homage to his uncle. Casas would receive further training after his debut from wrestlers such as Hijo del Santo, a long time friend of Casas' uncle José. In 2010 Casas teamed up with Eddy Vega on the Mexican independent circuit to for a tag team known as Los Nuevo Sexy Boys, working together regularly from 2010 until 2012. At some point in 2010 or 2011 Canelo Casas began training at CMLL's wrestling school under trainer Arkangel de la Muerte, appearing as a student of Arkangel at Arkangel's 25th Anniversary show. He competed in a 16-man torneo cibernetico along with other Arkangel de la Muerte trainees but did not win the match. On May 25, 2013 Canelo Casas outlasted 17 other wrestlers to win Copa Poder A Poder (The Power and Power Cup") in Gimnasio Benito Juarez de Mexico City.

=== Consejo Mundial de Lucha Libre (2013–present) ===
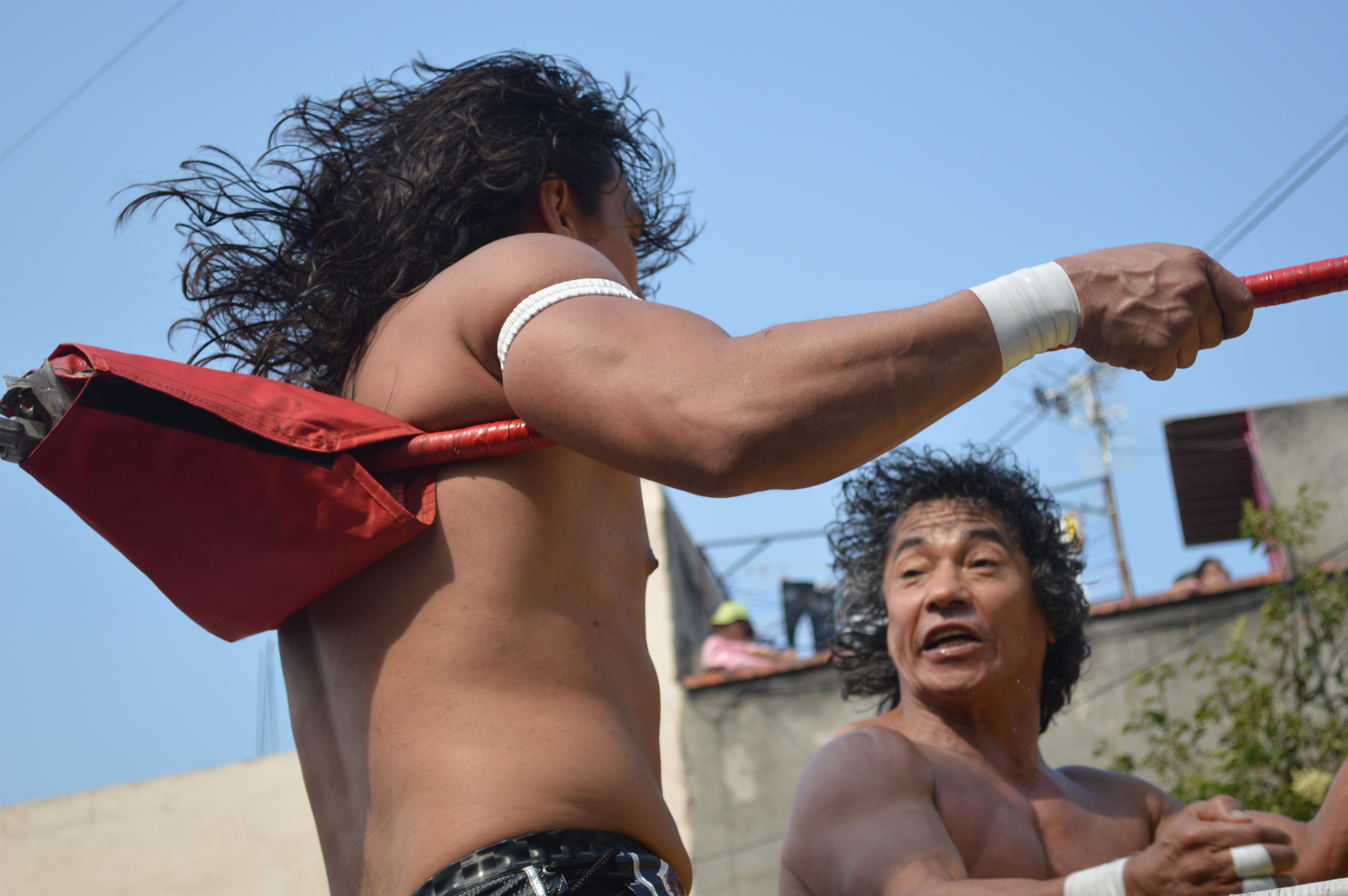
fighting against his uncle Negro Casas.

He received further training at CMLL's training school from resident trainers Arturo Beristain, Franco Colombo and Ringo Mendoza before and after making his in-ring debut for CMLL in the fall of 2013. He was one of 12 wrestlers to compete in the 2014 La Copa Junior tournament, outlasting Robin, Herodes Jr., Dragon Lee, Hijo del Signo, Oro Jr., Black Panther, Stigma, Cachorro, Hombre Bala Jr. and Guerrero Negro Jr. as he was the last man eliminated by tournament winner Super Halcón Jr. Later in the year Canelo Casas was one of eight novatos ("rookies") who competed in the 2014 Torneo Gran Alternativa ("Great Alternative Tournament"), a tag team tournament where CMLL pairs each novato up with an experienced wrestler to give the novatos more exposure to the fans. Canelo Casas was teamed up with his uncle Negro Casas for the tournament. The Casas family lost in the first round to the brother team of Dragon Lee and Rush in the first round of the tournament. Later in 2014 Canelo Casas and 15 other young wrestlers were given the chance to earn a spot in that year's En Busca de un Ídolo ("In search of an Idol") tournament by competing in a torneo cibenetico elimination match. Canelo did not earn a spot in the tournament as he was eliminated along with Black Panther, El Rebelde, Espiritu Negro, Flyer, Herodes, Jr., Metálico and Oro Jr. On December 5, 2014 Canelo Casas wrestled on his first major CMLL event as he teamed up with Disturbio, losing the opening match of the 2014 Infierno en el Ring show to Tritón and Pegasso.

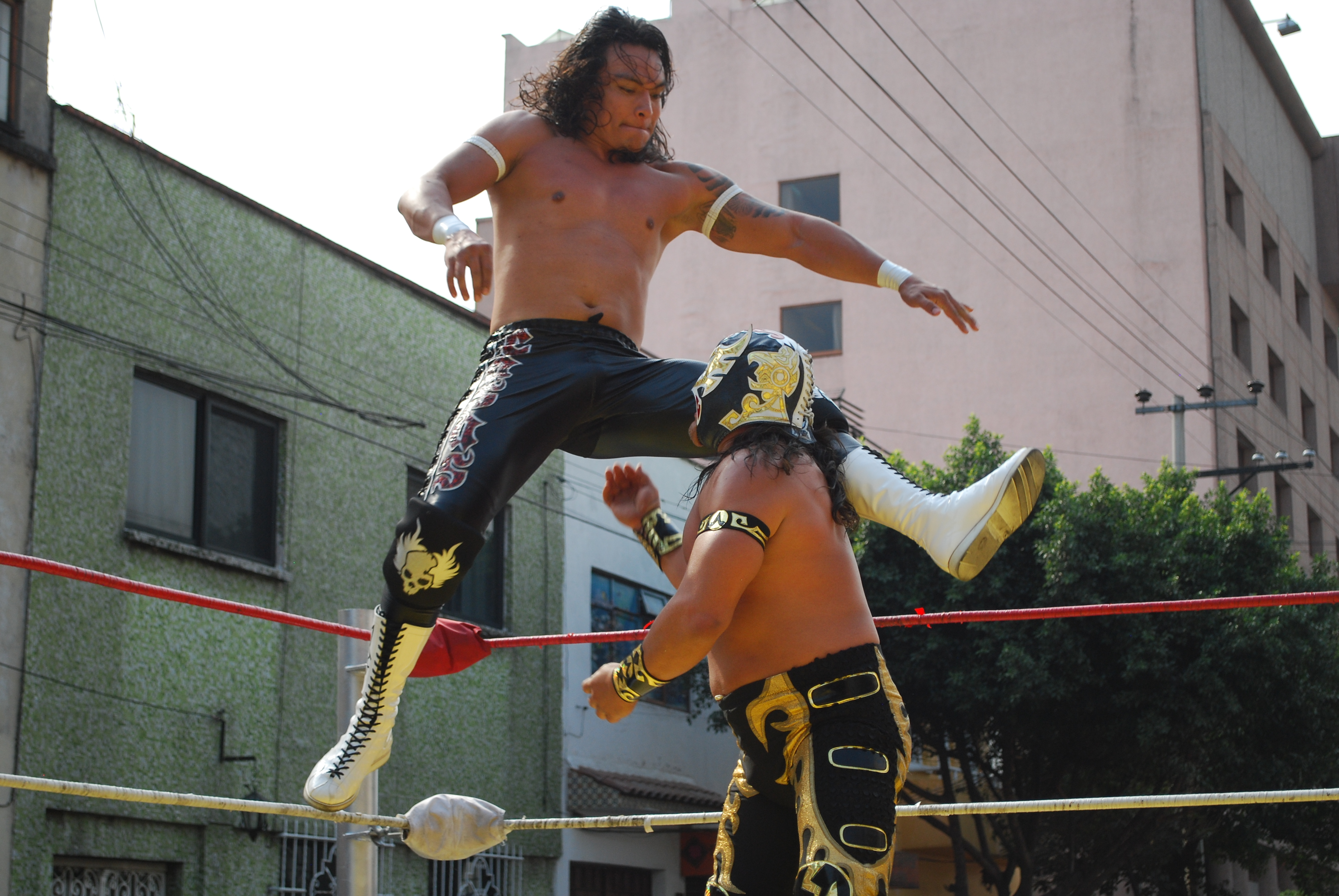
Performing a leaping Huracarrana on Último Guerrero.

In May 2015 Casas competed in a qualifying match for the 2015 version of En Busca de un Ídolo as one of 16 wrestlers in the qualifying torneo cibernetico elimination match where the last eight wrestlers would qualify for the tournament. He competed against Akuma, Blue Panther Jr., Cancerbero, Delta, Disturbio, Esfinge, Flyer, El Gallo, Guerrero Maya Jr., Joker, Pegasso, Raziel, Sagrado, Stigma, and Boby Zavala. Casas eliminated El Gallo and was among the eight wrestlers to qualify for the main portion of the tournament. During the En Busca de un Ídolo the wrestlers would face off in a round-robin first round earning points based on the outcome. After the match each wrestler would receive critique and points from a four-man judging panel rating them on the match they just saw. Finally all wrestlers would be given additional points from a weekly online poll open to fans. During the first round Casas defeated Blue Panther Jr., Delta, Disturbio, wrestled to a draw against Boby Zavala and Flyer and lost to Esfinge and Guerrero Maya Jr. His feedback from the judges was often critical of his skills, especially compared to his uncle Negro Casas and received between 22 and 30 points each week. Casas never scored highly in the weekly polls, with the lowest score being 4 points and the highest being 16 out of 40 points. Even before the final poll result for week 7 Canelo Casas was eliminated as he was at least 44 points out of fourth place.

== Luchas de Apuestas record ==
Winner (wager)	Loser (wager)	Location	Event	Date	Notes
Canelo Casas (hair)	Abdula (hair)	Cuernavaca, Morelos	Live event	November 22, 2009	
Canelo Casas (hair)	El Cholo (hair)	Mexico City	CMLL Domingo Arena Mexico	July 30, 2017	
