= Sin Salida =

2009 Consejo Mundial de Lucha Libre event

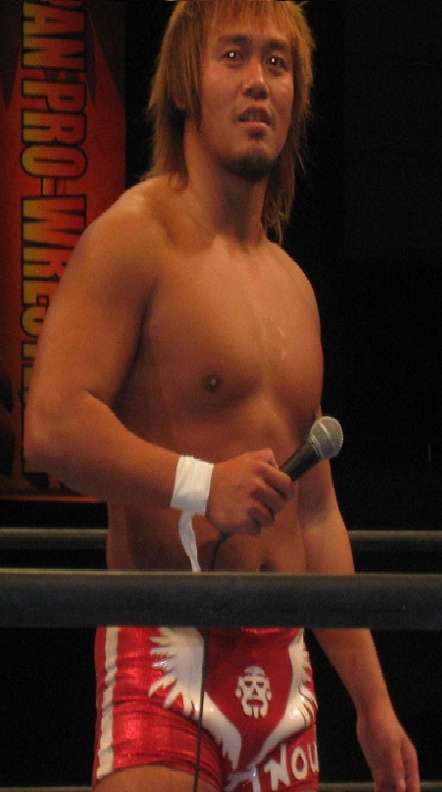
- Tetsuya Naito, lost his hair in the main event
- Promotion: Consejo Mundial de Lucha Libre (CMLL)
- Date: December 4, 2009
- City: Mexico City, Mexico
- Venue: Arena Mexico

Pay-per-view chronology
← Previous; Reyes del Aire	Next → Torneo Nacional de Parejas Increíbles

Sin Salida chronology
← Previous; First	Next → 2010

Sin Salida (Spanish for "No Escape") was a professional wrestling major show event produced by Consejo Mundial de Lucha Libre (CMLL) that took place on December 4, 2009. The main event of the event was a Lucha de Apuestas, hair vs. hair match between the teams of El Texano Jr. and El Terrible against No Limit (Yujiro and Naito), which was the latest highlight of a "Mexico vs. Japan" storyline that CMLL has presented since the summer of 2009. Also on the show was a match for the CMLL World Tag Team Championship as reigning champions Volador Jr. and La Sombra defends against Los Hijos del Averno (Mephisto and Ephesto). The show featured four additional matches, three six-man, two out of three falls, tag team matches that is the most common match form in CMLL, and one Relampago or Lightning match, a one fall match between Mini-Estrella Mascarita Dorada and Pequeño Damián 666.

== Production ==
=== Background ===
The Mexican wrestling company Consejo Mundial de Lucha Libre (Spanish for "World Wrestling Council"; CMLL) has held a number of major shows over the years using the moniker Sin Salida ("No Ext" or "No Escape"). CMLL has intermittently held a show billed specifically as Sin Salida since 2009, primarily using the name for their "end of the year" show in December, although once they held a Sin Piedad show in August as well. All Sin Salida shows have been held in Arena México in Mexico City, Mexico which is CMLL's main venue, its "home". Traditionally CMLL holds their major events on Friday Nights, which means the Sin Salida shows replace their regularly scheduled Super Viernes show. The 2009 Sin Salida show was the first show to use the name.

=== Storylines ===
The event featured six professional wrestling matches with different wrestlers involved in pre-existing scripted feuds, plots and storylines. Wrestlers were portrayed as either heels (referred to as rudos in Mexico, those that portray the "bad guys") or faces (técnicos in Mexico, the "good guy" characters) as they followed a series of tension-building events, which culminated in a wrestling match or series of matches.

== Aftermath ==
No Limit returned to Japan a few weeks after losing the Apuesta match to El Texano Jr. and El Terrible. Upon their return to New Japan Pro-Wrestling (NJPW) for their Wrestle Kingdom IV in Tokyo Dome show they defeated Team 3D (Brother Ray and Brother Devon) and Bad Intentions (Karl Anderson and Giant Bernard) to win the IWGP Tag Team Championship. Their first defense of the title was on February 14, against the team of Texano Jr. and El Terrible who travelled to Japan for the match. After departing CMLL, Naito made a return in January, promising to work in Mexico between tours with NJPW. The feud between Texano Jr. and El Terrible has since been downplayed to the extent that the team has at times teamed with La Ola Amarilla's newest representative Taichi.

The storyline between the Brazos family (Brazo de Plata and Máximo mainly) and La Peste Negra saw Máximo and Mr. Niebla being teamed for CMLL's CMLL Torneo Nacional de Parejas Increibles tournament due to the rules of the tournament pairing rudos and tecnicos together. The team worked together so well that they two worked a series of matches together under the nickname La Peste Con Amour ("The Love Plague"), hinting at Máximo turning rudo. The storyline abruptly ended in February when Mr. Niebla stopped appearing on CMLL booking.

== Results ==
No.	Results	Stipulations	Times
1	Pegasso, Rey Cometa and Rouge defeated Los Guerreros Tuareg (Hooligan, Skándalo and Loco Max)	Six-man "Lucha Libre rules" tag team match	09:45
2	Mascarita Dorada defeated Pequeño Damián 666	One fall Relampago (lightinging) match	07:02
3	Brazo de Plata, La Máscara and Máximo defeated La Peste Negra (Negro Casas and El Felino) and Misterioso Jr.	Six-man "Lucha Libre rules" tag team match	11:01
4	Místico, Héctor Garza and Jon Strongman defeated Los Guerreros del Infierno (Último Guerrero and Atlantis) and Mr. Niebla	Six-man "Lucha Libre rules" tag team match	13:56
5	Volador Jr. and La Sombra (c) defeated Los Hijos del Averno (Mephisto and Ephesto): First fall: Mephisto pinned Volador Jr. Ephesto forced La Sombra to Submit (1-0); Second fall: Volador Jr. pinned Mephisto, La Sombra pinned Ephesto (1-1); Third fall: Volador Jr. pinned Mephisto (2-1)	tag team match for the CMLL World Tag Team Championship	29:47 (02:04) (03:32) (24:11)
6	El Texano Jr. and El Terrible defeated No Limit (Yujiro and Naito): First fall: Texano Jr. pinned Yujiro, El Terrible pinned Naito (1-0); Second fall: No Limit pinned El Terrible (1-1); Third fall: El Terrible forced Naito to submit (2-1)	Tag team Lucha de Apuestas hair vs. hair match.	21:52 (04:30) (03:01) (14:21)
(c) / – the champion(s) heading into the match
