= Guerrero Maya Jr. =

Mexican, or masked professional wrestler (born 1985)

Guerrero Maya
- Guerrero Maya Jr. in July 2020

Personal information
- Born: August 8, 1985 (age 41) Atlixco, Puebla, Mexico
- Website: Guerrero Maya Jr.'s Facebook page

Professional wrestling career
- Ring name(s): Samba; Multifacético; Guerrero Maya Jr.
- Billed height: 1.78 m (5 ft 10 in)
- Billed weight: 88 kg (194 lb)
- Trained by: El Reo; El Dandy; El Satánico; Black Terry; Franco Colombo
- Debut: February 7, 2005

Guerrero Maya Jr. (Spanish for "Maya Warrior Junior", born August 8, 1985) is a Mexican professional wrestler, currently working for the Mexican promotion Consejo Mundial de Lucha Libre (CMLL). He portrays a tecnico ("good guy") wrestling character. Guerrero Maya Jr.'s real name is not a matter of public record, as is often the case with masked wrestlers in Mexico, where their private lives are kept a secret from the wrestling fans. He is the protégé and kayfabe son of Esteban Mares Castañeda, better known under the ring names Black Terry and Guerrero Maya. He has previously competed as the enmascarado characters Samba and Multifacético (the third person to use that name).

== Personal life ==
The man known under the ring name Guerrero Maya Jr. earned a degree in Business Administration from a European university before his professional wrestling career, noting that it was important to him to have a well rounded background, to combine intellect with skill. Maya Jr. does a lot of charity work through his employer Consejo Mundial de Lucha Libre (CMLL), including visiting sick children at various hospitals around Mexico, stating that he appreciates his career giving him opportunities like that. In late 2010 Guerrero Maya Jr. contracted Hepatitis A, but was able to fully recover after a month away from the ring, returning to active competition on February 1, 2011. It was not until his debut in CMLL that it was "revealed" that Guerrero Maya Jr. was the son of Esteban Mares Castañeda, who is better known under the ring names Black Terry and Guerrero Maya as they revealed that he was the son of "Guerrero Maya". (Note: It is in some dispute whether this was a storyline family relationship or not.)

== Professional wrestling career ==
After training under El Reo, El Dandy and Black Terry, he made his professional wrestling debut in 2005 on the Mexico State Independent circuit as the masked character Samba; he would receive additional training from El Satánico and Franco Columbo once he began working for CMLL.

=== International Wrestling Revolution Group (2007–2009) ===
In early 2007, he made a low card debut for International Wrestling Revolution Group (IWRG). Later that year, he was given a new ring name and mask with promotional support, becoming the tecnico ("good guy") Multifacético ("Multi-faceted"), the third wrestler to use the name and mask in IWRG. However, rather than supporting him, fans initially booed Multifacético due to his inexperience and frequent accidents. His in-ring skills improved over time, notably during his long-running feud with Black Terry; Súper Luchas Magazine stated the two put on some of the best IWRG matches in 2008. During the storyline, Multifacético defeated Black Terry to win the IWRG Intercontinental Welterweight Championship, holding it for 67 days before losing it to Fuerza Guerrera on May 29, 2008. Between February 17 and April 17, he achieved several Lucha de Apuestas ("bet match") victories against Kaminari, Cyborg and Black Terry in rapid succession, where his opponents were forced to have their hair shaved off after their loss. Multifacético competed in the Rey del Ring ("King of the Ring") tournament, a 30-man elimination tournament, where he was the second to last man eliminated by eventual winner Scorpio Jr.

=== Consejo Mundial de Lucha Libre (2009–present) ===
Multifacético stopped appearing on IWRG shows in early 2009 without any explanation. A few months later, CMLL announced that Guerrero Maya Jr., the son of retired enmascarado Guerrero Maya, was joining CMLL. This announcement was the first official "confirmation" that the former Multifacético was actually the son of Black Terry, who once played the Guerrero Maya character. Guerrero Maya Jr. made his in-ring debut on May 31, alongside a number of other new recently-signed wrestlers. Initially, he wore an aquamarine and black mask and full body suit, but later changed his color scheme and mask design to a black base with green, pink and blue colors, including a visible "M" logo reminiscent of the Multifacético mask.

Guerrero Maya Jr. posing in July 2020

Guerrero Maya Jr. received his first major opportunity on April 23, 2010, when he and Valiente participated in the Torneo Gran Alternativa ("Great Alternative Tournament"), which pairs a rookie with a veteran, but lost to Averno and Raziel in the first round. He entered the following year's Torneo Gran Alternativa on April 1, 2011, this time teaming with Máximo, but again lost in the first round to Negro Casas and Puma King. Following this, he entered the Forjando un Ídolo ("Forging an Idol") tournament along with a number of other young wrestlers. Guerrero Maya Jr. defeated Metal Blanco, but lost to Dragon Lee and Delta; due to fan voting, he earned an additional point, forcing a tie between himself and Blanco, whom he defeated to move on to the second round. He lost in the first round of the second round to Ángel de Oro. By this time, Guerrero Maya Jr. received a push, making it to the final of a tournament for the vacant CMLL World Super Lightweight Championship, which he lost to Virus. In June, he, Atlantis and Delta defeated Casas, Diamante and Hijo del Signo to win the Forjándo un Ídolo: La guerra continúa ("Forging an Idol: the war continues") tournament. Guerrero Maya Jr. was injured during the semi-final match, but worked through it to win the final, although he then had to take a couple of months off to recover from his shoulder injury.

On November 16, Atlantis announced that he was officially forming a stable named Los Reyes de la Atlantida ("The Kings of the Atlantis") with Guerrero Maya Jr. and Delta. At Sin Piedad on December 16, they defeated Los Invasores (Olímpico, Psicosis II and Volador Jr.) to win the Mexican National Trios Championship. On February 17, 2012, Guerrero Maya Jr. competed in his first Torneo Nacional de Parejas Increíbles, teaming with rudo ("bad guy") Euforia in a first round loss to Máscara Dorada and Volador Jr. On June 22, they lost the title to Los Depredadores del Aire (Black Warrior, Mr. Águila and Volador Jr.). They regained the title on October 30, but lost it to Los Invasores' Kraneo, Mr. Águila and Psicosis II on December 16. Nine days later, Guerrero Maya Jr. unsuccessfully challenged Casas for the NWA Historic Welterweight Championship at a special Christmas show, having defeated him in a series of matches leading up to it. On March 1, 2013, Guerrero Maya Jr. and Casas lost to La Sombra and Volador Jr. in the first round of the Torneo Nacional de Parejas Increíbles. On November 3, he and Delta defeated La Fiebre Amarilla (Namajague and Okumura) to win the CMLL Arena Coliseo Tag Team Championship, losing it over 400 days later to La Comando Caribeño (Misterioso Jr. and Sagrado) on February 28, 2015. On April 26, Los Reyes de la Atlantida won their record-breaking third Mexican National Trios Championship from La Peste Negra (Casas, El Felino and Mr. Niebla).

In May, Guerrero Maya Jr. competed in a qualifying match for the 2015 version of En Busca de un Ídolo with as one of 16 wrestlers in the qualifying torneo cibernetico, elimination match where the last eight wrestlers would qualify for the tournament. He competed against Akuma, Blue Panther Jr., Cancerbero, Canelo Casas, Delta, Disturbio, Esfinge, Flyer, El Gallo, Joker, Pegasso, Raziel, Sagrado, Stigma and Boby Zavala. He eliminated Raziel and was one of the survivors to qualify for the main portion of the tournament. Maya Jr. earned 100 points out of a possible 140 points by winning 5 matches, losing only to Boby Zavala and Esfinge. Maya Jr. also scored favorable points from the judges, El Tirantes, El Hijo del Gladiador, Shocker and a rotating judge, earning a total of 213 points, an average of 7.6, the second highest of the first round. With 225 points from the fan polls Guerrero Maya Jr. ended up in first place after the first round with a total of 538 points, thus qualifying for the second round of the tournament. In the finals Guerrero Maya Jr. lost to Bobby Zavala. On December 19, 2015 Guerrero Maya Jr, teaming with The Panther regained the CMLL Arena Coliseo Tag Team Championship from La Comando Caribeño, making Guerrero Maya Jr. the first wrestler in the modern age to win that championship twice. In January 2016, Guerrero Maya Jr. made his Japanese debut by taking part in the CMLL and New Japan Pro-Wrestling (NJPW) co-produced Fantastica Mania 2016 tour. On the fifth show of the tour, he and The Panther successfully defended the Arena Coliseo Tag Team Championship against Boby Z and Okumura. On December 25, 2016 Guerrero Maya Jr and The Panther lost the title against Black Terry and Negro Navarro, two independent wrestlers who do not work for CMLL, the match took place at the Lucha Memes show "Chairo 7: Hell In a Christmas Cell", a non-CMLL show.

=== U.S. appearances ===
Guerrero Maya Jr. and Stuka Jr. represented CMLL at the 2019 Crockett Cup tournament on April 27, 2019 in Concord, North Carolina. The duo lost to Royce Isaacs and Thomas Latimer in the first round of the tournament to be eliminated.

== Championships and accomplishments ==
- Consejo Mundial de Lucha Libre
  - CMLL Arena Coliseo Tag Team Championship (2 times) – with Delta, with The Panther

- Mexican National Trios Championship (3 times) – with Atlantis and Delta
- Mexican National Middleweight Championship (1 time)
- Rey del Inframundo (2025)
- Torneo Cinco de Mayo (2024)
- Forjando un Ídolo: Guerra Continúa (2011) – with Atlantis and Delta

- International Wrestling Revolution Group

- IWRG Intercontinental Welterweight Championship (1 time)

== Luchas de Apuestas record ==
Winner (wager)	Loser (wager)	Location	Event	Date	Notes
Multifacético (mask)	Kaminari (hair)	Naucalpan, State of Mexico	IWRG Live event	February 17, 2008	
Multifacético (mask)	Cyborg (hair)	Naucalpan, State of Mexico	IWRG Live event	March 16, 2008	
Multifacético (mask)	Black Terry (hair)	Naucalpan, State of Mexico	IWRG Live event	April 17, 2008	
