= CMLL 83rd Anniversary Show =

Mexican professional wrestling supercard show

- Official poster for the event depicting the four competitors in the Lucha de Apuestas matches
- Promotion: Consejo Mundial de Lucha Libre
- Date: September 2, 2016
- City: Mexico City, Mexico
- Venue: Arena México
- Attendance: Sold out (approximately 16,000)

Event chronology
← Previous; Leyenda de Plata	Next → Leyendas Mexicanas

CMLL Anniversary Shows chronology
← Previous; 82nd Anniversary	Next → 84th Anniversary

The CMLL 83rd Anniversary Show (Spanish: 83. Aniversario de CMLL) was a major professional wrestling event which was scripted and produced by the lucha libre wrestling company Consejo Mundial de Lucha Libre (CMLL; Spanish for "World Wrestling Council") that took place on September 2, 2016, in CMLL's home arena Arena México in Mexico City, Mexico. The show is the biggest show of the year for CMLL, considered their version of the Super Bowl or WrestleMania. The CMLL Anniversary Show is the longest-running annual professional wrestling shows.

The main event was a Lucha de Apuestas, or "bet match", between Dragon Lee and La Máscara where both wrestlers put their mask on the line, in the end Dragon Lee pinned La Máscara, forcing La Máscara to unmask and reveal his birth name, Felipe de Jesús Alvarado. A second Lucha de Apuesta took place, with Rey Bucanero defeating Super Crazy forcing Super Crazy to be shaved bald as a result. The show featured four additional matches, including a match for the CMLL World Trios Championship

== Production ==
=== Background ===
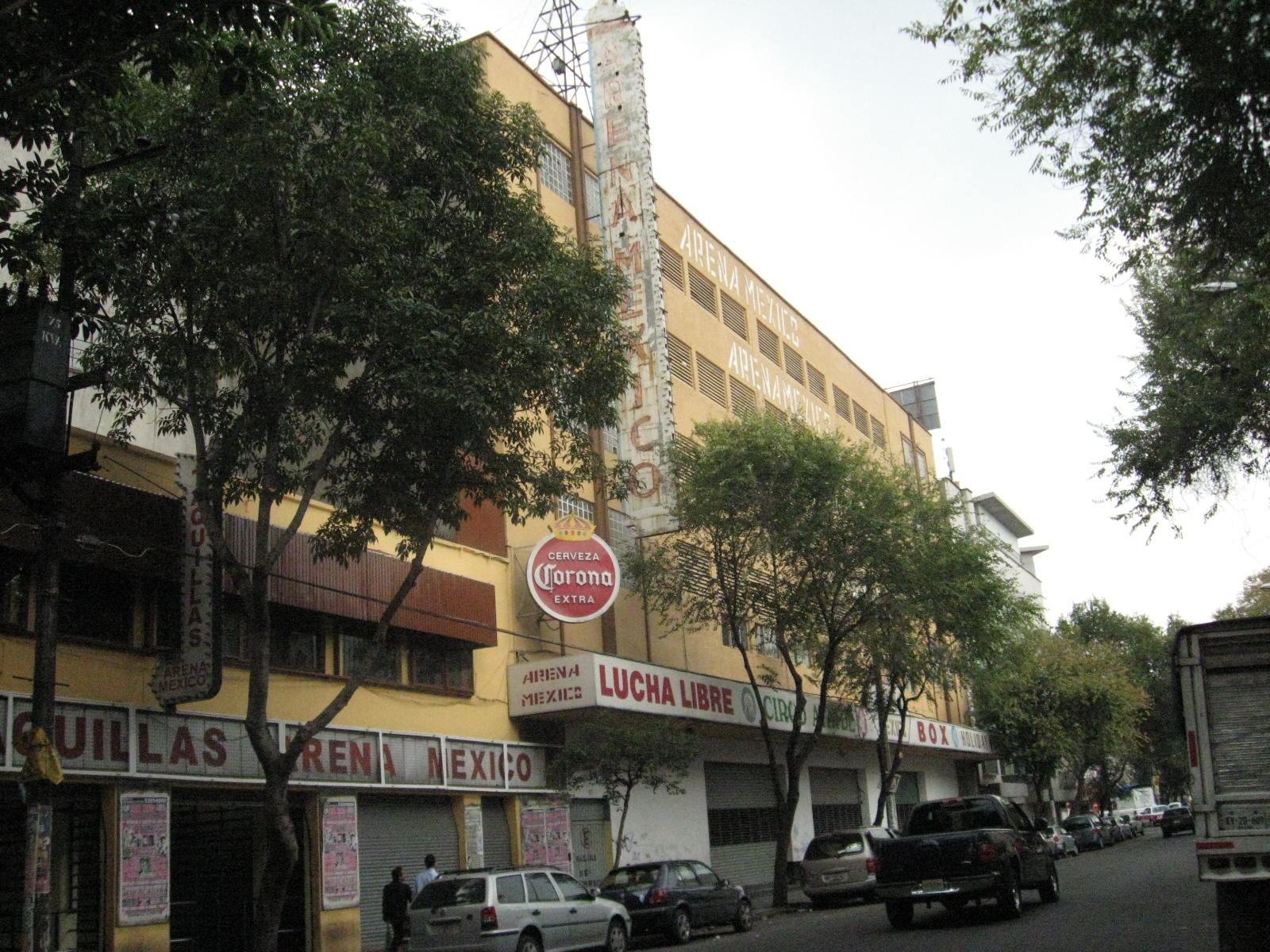
Arena México, CMLL's main venue and location of the 83rd Anniversary Show

The Mexican Lucha libre (professional wrestling) company Consejo Mundial de Lucha Libre (CMLL) started out under the name Empresa Mexicana de Lucha Libre ("Mexican Wrestling Company"; EMLL), founded by Salvador Lutteroth in 1933. Lutteroth, inspired by professional wrestling shows he had attended in Texas, decided to become a wrestling promoter and held his first show on September 21, 1933, marking what would be the beginning of organized professional wrestling in Mexico. Lutteroth would later become known as "the father of Lucha Libre" . A year later EMLL held the EMLL 1st Anniversary Show, starting the annual tradition of the Consejo Mundial de Lucha Libre Anniversary Shows that have been held each year ever since, most commonly in September. Over the years the anniversary show would become the biggest show of the year for CMLL, akin to the Super Bowl for the National Football League (NFL) or WWE's WrestleMania event. The first anniversary show was held in Arena Modelo, which Lutteroth had bought after starting EMLL. In 1942–43 Lutteroth financed the construction of Arena Coliseo, which opened in April 1943. The EMLL 10th Anniversary Show was the first of the anniversary shows to be held in Arena Coliseo. In 1956 Lutteroth had Arena México built in the location of the original Arena Modelo, making Arena México the main venue of EMLL from that point on. Starting with the EMLL 23rd Anniversary Show, all anniversary shows except for the EMLL 46th Anniversary Show have been held in the arena that would become known as "The Cathedral of Lucha Libre". On occasion EMLL held more than one show labelled as their "Anniversary" show, such as two 33rd Anniversary Shows in 1966. Over time the anniversary show series became the oldest, longest-running annual professional wrestling show. In comparison, WWE's WrestleMania is only the fourth oldest still promoted show (after CMLL's Arena Coliseo Anniversary Show and Arena México anniversary shows). EMLL was supposed to hold the EMLL 52nd Anniversary Show on September 20, 1985 but Mexico City was hit by a magnitude 8.0 earthquake. EMLL canceled the event both because of the general devastation but also over fears that Arena México might not be structurally sound after the earthquake.

When Jim Crockett Promotions was bought by Ted Turner in 1988 EMLL became the oldest still active promotion in the world. In 1991 EMLL was rebranded as "Consejo Mundial de Lucha Libre" and thus held the CMLL 59th Anniversary Show, the first under the new name, on September 18, 1992. Traditionally CMLL holds their major events on Friday Nights, replacing their regularly scheduled Super Viernes show. The 2016 show will commemorate the 83rd anniversary of CMLL. On July 29 CMLL announced that the 83rd Anniversary would take place on September 2, but did not announce any matches at that point in time. They did suggest several potential featured matches, hinting at matches between Último Guerrero and Volador Jr., Dragón Rojo Jr. and Guerrero Maya Jr. for the CMLL World Middleweight Championship, Rey Bucanero and Súper Crazy potentially facing off in a Lucha de Apuestas, or "bet match", and finally highlighting the ongoing storyline between La Máscara and the Muñoz family (Rush, Místico, Drágon Lee and Comandante Pierroth) that could also end with a Lucha de Apuestas match.

The CMLL 83rd Anniversary Show was one of three major shows held within a week of each other, produced by the three biggest lucha libre promotions in Mexico, CMLL, AAA and International Wrestling Revolution Group (IWRG). The first major show will be AAA's Triplemanía XXIV, slated to take place on Sunday August 28 in Arena Ciudad de México – AAA's biggest show of the year. CMLL's 83rd Anniversary Show will take place five days later on September 2 and finally the third largest Mexican lucha libre promotion, IWRG will hold IWRG La Hora de la Verdad in Arena Naucalpan two days later on September 4, headlines by a Lucha de Apuestas, mask vs. mask match, between Trauma I and Canis Lupus.

=== Storylines ===
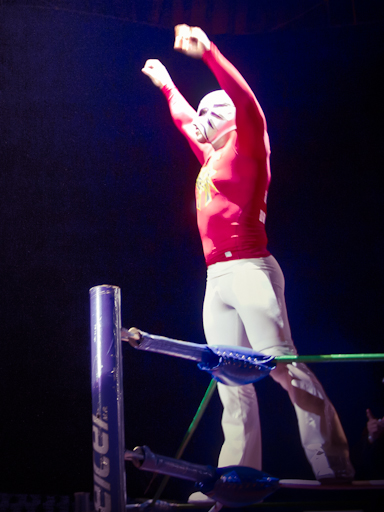
La Máscara, who was feuding with two generations of the Muñoz family leading up to the show.

The 83rd Anniversary Show featured six professional wrestling matches scripted by CMLL with some wrestlers involved in scripted feuds. The wrestlers portrayed either heels (referred to as rudos in Mexico, those that play the part of the "bad guys") or faces (técnicos in Mexico, the "good guy" characters) as they perform.

During the summer of 2014 luchadors Rush, La Máscara and La Sombra formed a group known as Los Ingobernables (Spanish for "The Unruly"), a trio that declared that they were neither rudo nor técnico, but only loyal to Los Ingobernables. When Rush was injured the group brought in Marco Corleone to take his place as part of Los Ingobernables, when Rush returned Corleone would still team with Los Ingobernables on a regular basis. Through the rest of 2014 and into 2015 the group would main event several major CMLL shows, including Rush defeating Negro Casas in a Lucha de Apuestas match at the 2014 Juicio Final show, La Sombra being a finalist in the 2014 Universal Championship tournament, and La Sombra losing to Atlantis in the main event of the CMLL 82nd Anniversary Show. In late 2015 La Sombra left CMLL to work for WWE, reducing the group to three members in total. During the February 19 Super Viernes show, Rush, La Máscara and Corleone faced Atlantis, Valiente and Rush and Corleone's former Bufete del Amor partner Máximo Sexy in a six-man tag team match. After failing to get along with his partners throughout the match, Corleone stood up for Máximo as he was being brutalized by Rush and La Máscara, leading the two to turn on him and kick him out of Los Ingobernables. On March 18 at the 2016 Homenaje a Dos Leyendas, Rush defeated Máximo Sexy in a Hair vs. Hair Lucha de Apuestas with help from his father Pierroth.

The anticipated feud between Rush and Marco Corleone never happened, instead, the remaining two original Ingobernales split up. On May 13, Los Ingobernables members were defeated by TGR (Rey Bucanero, Shocker and El Terrible) in a six-man tag team match, after which Rush and Pierroth turned on La Máscara and attacked him. After being saved by TGR, La Máscara announced he was quitting Los Ingobernables and challenged Rush to a Lucha de Apuestas match, although Rush did not respond at the time. In the following months La Máscara started to feud with the entire Muñoz family, Rush, Pierroth and Rush's brothers Místico and Drágon Lee. The various Muñoz family members challenged La Máscara to put his mask on the line against them, but each time he turned them down. On July 15, 2016 La Máscara and Drágon Lee faced off in the final moments of the 2016 Leyenda de Plata tournament. Rush entered the ring during the match, attacking La Máscara to cause a disqualification loss for his younger brother. After the Leyenda de Plata tournament the feud began to focus on La Máscara and Drágon Lee more so than the original issues between La Máscara and Rush. After Drágon Lee finally managed to defeat La Máscara he repeated his Lucha de Apuestas challenge, with La Máscara finally accepting the challenge. CMLL held a press conference on August 10, announcing the full anniversary show, including Drágon Lee facing La Máscara in the main event with their masks on the line. With the announcement CMLL also confirmed that Drágon Lee, at the age of 21, would be the youngest wrestler to ever compete in a Lucha de Apuestas match at an anniversary show.

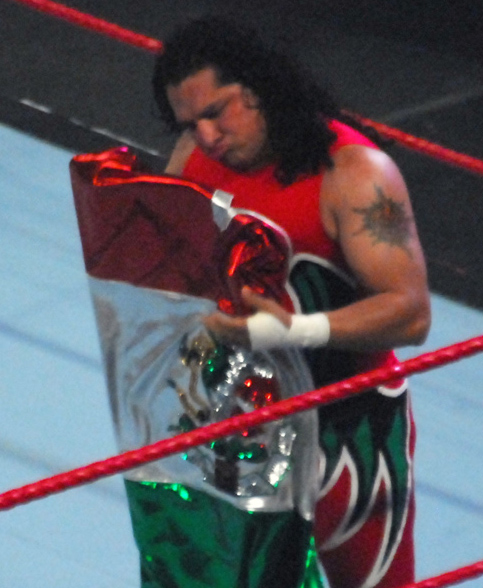
Super Crazy, facing off against Rey Bucanero in a Lucha de Apuestas match where both wrestlers put their hair on the line.

The issues between Rey Bucanero and Súper Crazy spun out of a feud between Súper Crazy and El Felino that took place in Lucha Libre Elite, a promotion closely related with CMLL. Súper Crazy and Felino faced off in the first ever Lucha de Apuestas match in Lucha Libre Elite on February 28, 2016. Súper Crazy won the match, forcing El Felino to have all his hair shaved off. Over the summer of 2016 CMLL regular Rey Bucanero voiced his displeasure with what he considered "Súper Crazy's bragging" about the Apuesta win. On the July 15 Súper Crazy made his return to CMLL after not working for the company directly for in 12 years. Súper Crazy, Máximo Sexy and Valiente defeated Rey Bucanero, El Terrible and Vangelis as the "war of words" turned physical in the ring. The following week Súper Crazy teamed up with Lucha Libre Elite representatives Golden Magic and Sharlie Rockstar to defeat Bucanero and CMLL representatives El Terrible and Shocker. Afterwards Luchas de Apuestas challenges were made but nothing was officially agreed to. The following week Súper Crazy's team won once again, frustrating Bucanero even further. On August 10 CMLL confirmed that the match between the two would be the second Lucha de Apuestas match on the 83rd Anniversary Show.

== Event ==
The opening match of the 83rd Anniversary Show was a best two-out-of-three falls six-woman "Lucha Libre rules" tag team match between the tecnica trio of Lluvia, Marcela and Princesa Sugehit and the ruda team of La Amapola, Dalys la Caribeña and Zeuxis. The first fall was won by the tecnica team when Princesa Sugehit forced La Amapola to submit to an arm bar. The ruda team evened the falls when La Amapola pinned Princesa Sugehit after executing a Devil's Wings (Lifting double underhook facebuster). During the third fall Lluvia appeared to be injured, although it was unclear if it was a legitimate injury or part of the script. In the end Daly pinned Marcela to win the third and final fall.

For the second match regular tag team partners Marco Corleone and Máximo Sexy were teamed up with Stuka Jr. to face two-thirds of Los Hijos del Infierno ("The Sons of the Inferno"; Ephesto and Mephisto) were teamed up with Shocker. The first fall lasted 5 minutes and 18 seconds before Ephesto pinned Stuka Jr. The second fall lasted around half the time of the first fall, 2:48 in total, before Marco Corleone pinned Shocker after leaping from the ramp into the ring to hit Shocker. In the break between the second and third fall the two factions attack each other, with Mephisto ending up getting his mask pulled off. The third fall lasted 3 minutes and 43 second before Máximo Sexy pinned Mephisto.

For the first of the Lucha de Apuestas matches Rey Bucanero took the first fall in less than a minute, with Super Crazy taking the second fall even faster than that to tie the match for the third and deciding fall. The third fall lasted longer than the first two falls combined, with neither wrestler gaining a distinctive advantage during the final fall. The "home town" representative Rey Bucanero finally managed to lock on a Cross armbar on Super Crazy, forcing him to submit moments later. After the match Super Crazy knelt in the middle of the ring as he had his hair shaved off.

The fourth match marked the first time that Carístico wrestled at a CMLL Anniversary Show since the CMLL 77th Anniversary Show as he teamed up with Atlantis and Máscara Dorada to take on the group known as La Peste Negra ("The Black Plague"; Bárbaro Cavernario, El Felino and Negro Casas). Carístico lost the first fall in 5:12 when Negro Casas landed a hard kick in the corner and then pinned his long time rival. The second fall, at only 2:30, was the shortest of the match and saw the tecnico team even the score. In the third and decisive fall Atlantis forced Negro Casas to submit, taking the victory for his team with a third fall that lasted 4 minutes, 23 seconds.

The semi-final match of the night marked the seventh time that The Sky Team (Místico, Valiente and Volador Jr.) defended the CMLL World Trios Championship since winning it on February 13, 2015. Their opponents, Los Guerreros Lagunero ("The Warriors of the Lagoon"; Euforia, Gran Guerrero and Último Guerrero) won the first fall of the match with a triple submission on the Sky Team members. 59 seconds into the second fall Místico pinned one of Los Guerreros to even the score amidst loud boos from the crowd. In the end Volador Jr. pinned long running rival Último Guerrero to retain their championship.

For the main event Dragon Lee had his brother Rush accompany him to the ring and working as his corner man, while La Máscara was accompanied by Shocker, who had played a peripheral role in the storyline prior to the anniversary show. During the first fall Rush helped his younger brother win the fall, pulling La Máscara's leg while the referee had his back turned. In the second fall Rush's interference was noticed by the referee causing Dragon Lee to lose the second fall of the match. After the disqualification the referee tried to make Rush leave the arena, but at first he refused. It was not until Dragon Lee pleaded with Rush to leave, fearing he would lose the match all-together if Rush did not leave, that Rush left the arena. The third fall was the longest of the match with both Dragon Lee and La Máscara executing several of their signature moves and dives out of the ring. At one point Dragon Lee rolled La Máscara up with a la Casita hold, but Rush ran back in the arena and distracted the referee to prevent the pinfall. The third fall was decided when Dragon Lee managed to execute his finishing move, the Phoenix Plex, and then pinned La Máscara.

After the match La Máscara removed his mask and stated that his real name was Felipe de Jesús Alvarado, that he had been a wrestler for 16 years and that he was 34 years old. Following the unmasking Rush and La Máscara seemed to put their differences aside, putting their past rivalry behind them. After the match Dragon Lee celebrated with his other brother Místico, who were both boo'ed by the crowd despite both of them being técnicos. Backstage after the show Rush and La Máscara met up with the third original Ingobernable, La Sombra, who was in attendance for the show.

== Results ==
No.	Results	Stipulations	Times
1	La Amapola, Dalys la Caribeña and Zeuxis defeated Lluvia, Marcela and Princesa Sugehit	Best two-out-of-three falls six-woman "Lucha Libre rules" tag team match	15:44
2	Marco Corleone, Máximo Sexy and Stuka Jr. defeated Shocker and Los Hijos del Infierno (Ephesto and Mephisto)	Best two-out-of-three falls six-man "Lucha Libre rules" tag team match	11:49
3	Rey Bucanero defeated Súper Crazy	Best two-out-of-three falls Lucha de Apuestas, hair vs. hair match	13:46
4	Atlantis, Carístico and Máscara Dorada defeated La Peste Negra (Bárbaro Cavernario, El Felino and Negro Casas)	Best two-out-of-three falls six-man "Lucha Libre rules" tag team match	12:05
5	The Sky Team (Místico, Valiente and Volador Jr.) (c) defeated Los Guerreros Lagunero (Euforia, Gran Guerrero and Último Guerrero)	Best two-out-of-three falls six-man "Lucha Libre rules" tag team match for the CMLL World Trios Championship	11:34
6	Dragon Lee defeated La Máscara	Best two-out-of-three falls Lucha de Apuestas, mask vs. mask match	22:51
(c) / – the champion(s) heading into the match
