= Leyenda de Plata (2016) =

Mexican professional wrestling tournament

- Official poster for the event, listing Negro Casas as a participant.
- Promotion: Consejo Mundial de Lucha Libre
- Date: July 15, 2016; July 22, 2016
- City: Mexico City, Mexico
- Venue: Arena México

Event chronology
← Previous; CMLL International Gran Prix	Next → CMLL 83rd Anniversary Show

Leyenda de Plata chronology
← Previous; 2015	Next → 2017

The Leyenda de Plata (2016) was professional wrestling tournament produced by the Mexican wrestling promotion Consejo Mundial de Lucha Libre (CMLLl; Spanish "World Wrestling Council") that ran from July 15, 2016, over the course of two of CMLL's Friday night shows in Arena México with the finals on July 22, 2016. The annual Leyenda de Plata tournament is held in honor of lucha libre legend El Santo and is one of CMLL's most important annual tournaments. The tournament consists of a torneo cibernetico elimination match as the first round and the winner of that match would face the previous' year's winner in the finals. For the 2016 tournament CMLL it was originally announced that the 2015 tournament winner, Negro Casas, was part of the initial field, but later replaced him with Dragon Lee to keep the original format intact.

The torneo cibernetic competitors included: Bárbaro Cavernario, Dragon Lee, Guerrero Maya Jr., La Máscara, Mephisto, Místico, the Panther, Ripper, Titán, Tritón, Virus and Volador Jr. During the final moments of the torneo cibernetico La Máscara applied the La Campana submission hold on Dragon Lee, when Lee's older brother Rush ran to the ring and attacked La Máscara to cause a disqualification. After the match, Dragon Lee challenged La Máscara to a Lucha de Apuestas match, but La Máscara did not accept the match at the time. After the challenge, La Máscara attacked Dragon Lee and stole Dragon Lee's mask. The following week La Máscara defeated Negro Casas after interference from Casas' corner man Tiger hit Casas instead.

== Production ==
=== Background ===
The Leyenda de Plata (Spanish for "the Silver Legend") is an annual lucha libre tournament scripted and promoted by the Mexican professional wrestling promotion Consejo Mundial de Lucha Libre (CMLL). The first Leyenda de Plata was held in 1998 and was in honor of El Santo, nicknamed Enmáscarado de Plata (the Silver mask) from which the tournament got its name. The trophy given to the winner is a plaque with a metal replica of the mask that El Santo wore in both wrestling and lucha films.

The Leyenda de Plata was held annually until 2003, at which point El Santo's son, El Hijo del Santo left CMLL on bad terms. The tournament returned in 2004 and has been held on an almost annual basis since then. The original format of the tournament was the Torneo cibernetico elimination match to qualify for a semi-final. The winner of the semi-final would face the winner of the previous year's tournament in the final. Since 2005 CMLL has held two cibernetico matches and the winner of each then meet in the semi-final. In 2011, the tournament was modified to eliminate the final stage as the previous winner, Místico, did not work for CMLL at that point in time The 2016 edition of La Leyenda de Plata was the 14th overall tournament held by CMLL.

=== Storylines ===
The events featured a total of number of professional wrestling matches with different wrestlers involved in pre-existing scripted feuds, plots and storylines. Wrestlers were portrayed as either heels (referred to as rudos in Mexico, those that portray the "bad guys") or faces (técnicos in Mexico, the "good guy" characters) as they followed a series of tension-building events, which culminated in a wrestling match or series of matches.

== Tournament overview ==
=== Cibernetico ===
#	Eliminated	Eliminated by
1	Tritón	Bárbaro Cavernario
2	Virus	Titán
3	Ripper	The Panther
4	Ripper	Guerrero Maya Jr.
5	Titán	Mephisto
6	Guerrero Maya Jr.	Místico
7	Mephisto	La Máscara
8	Bárbaro Cavernario	Dragon Lee
9	Volador Jr.	La Máscara
10	Místico	La Máscara
11	Dragon Lee	Disqualification
12	Winner	La Máscara

== Results ==
=== July 15, 2016 ===
No.	Results	Stipulations
1	Reina Isis and Tiffany defeated La Vaquerita and Skadi	Best two-out-of-three falls tag team match
2	Ángel de Oro, Rey Cometa and Stuka Jr. defeated Hechicero Los Hijos del Infierno (Ephesto and Luciferno)	Best two-out-of-three falls six-man tag team match
3	Máximo Sexy, Súper Crazy and Valiente defeated TGR (Rey Bucanero, El Terrible and Vangellys)	Best two-out-of-three falls six-man tag team match
4	Místico, Dragón Lee, Mephisto, Tritón, Virus and Ripper defeated Volador Jr., La Máscara, Titán, Guerrero Maya Jr., Bárbaro Cavernario and the Panther	Leyenda de Plata seeding battle royal
5	La Máscara won the 12-man elimination match	2016 Leyenda de Plata semi-final, 16-man torneo cibernetico elimination match
6	Atlantis, Diamante Azul and Rush defeated Los Guerreros Lagunero (Euforia, Gran Guerrero and Último Guerrero)	Best two-out-of-three falls six-man tag team match

=== July 22, 2016 ===
No.	Results	Stipulations	Times
1	Robin and Sensei defeated Artillero and El Cholo	Best two-out-of-three falls tag team match	—
2	Astral, Eléctrico, and Último Dragóncito defeated Demus 3:16, Mercurio, and Pierrothito	Best two-out-of-three falls six-man tag team match	—
3	Golden Magic, Sharlie Rockstar, and Súper Crazy defeated Rey Bucanero, Shocker, and El Terrible by disqualification	Best two-out-of-three falls six-man tag team match	10:25
4	Atlantis, Diamante Azul, and Stuka Jr. defeated Ephesto, Luciferno, and Mephisto	Best two-out-of-three falls six-man tag team match	12:07
5	Místico, Valiente, and Volador Jr. defeated Euforia, Gran Guerrero, and Último Guerrero	Best two-out-of-three falls six-man tag team match	12:25
6	La Máscara defeated Negro Casas	2016 Leyenda de Plata finals	08:20
