= Leyenda de Plata (2017) =

Mexican professional wrestling tournament

- Official poster for the Leyenda de Plata tournament final show
- Promotion: Consejo Mundial de Lucha Libre
- Date: October 13, 2017; October 20, 2017
- City: Mexico City
- Venue: Arena México

Event chronology
← Previous; CMLL 84th Anniversary Show	Next → Día de Muertos

Leyenda de Plata chronology
← Previous; 2016	Next → 2018

The Leyenda de Plata (2017) (Spanish for "Silver Legend") was professional wrestling tournament produced by the Mexican wrestling promotion Consejo Mundial de Lucha Libre (CMLLl; Spanish "World Wrestling Council") that ran from October 13, 2017, over the course of two of CMLL's Friday night shows in Arena México with the finals on October 20, 2017. The annual Leyenda de Plata tournament is held in honor of lucha libre legend El Santo and is one of CMLL's most important annual tournaments.

The first round of the tournament was a torneo cibernetico elimination match featuring Sansón, Puma, Mistico, Volador Jr., Guerrero Maya Jr., The Panther, Carístico, Forastero, Soberano Jr., Dragon Lee, Negro Casas, Tiger, Titán, Mephisto, Virus and Cavernario. Carístico and Volador Jr. survived the match to qualify for the finals. The following week Volador Jr. defeated Carístico to win the 2017 Leyenda de Plata tournament.

== Production ==
=== Background ===
The Leyenda de Plata (Spanish for "the Silver Legend") is an annual lucha libre tournament scripted and promoted by the Mexican professional wrestling promotion Consejo Mundial de Lucha Libre (CMLL). The first Leyenda de Plata was held in 1998 and was in honor of El Santo, nicknamed Enmáscarado de Plata (the Silver mask) from which the tournament got its name. The trophy given to the winner is a plaque with a metal replica of the mask that El Santo wore in both wrestling and lucha films.

The Leyenda de Plata was held annually until 2003, at which point El Santo's son, El Hijo del Santo left CMLL on bad terms. The tournament returned in 2004 and has been held on an almost annual basis since then. The original format of the tournament was the Torneo cibernetico elimination match to qualify for a semi-final. The winner of the semi-final would face the winner of the previous year's tournament in the final. Since 2005 CMLL has held two cibernetico matches and the winner of each then meet in the semi-final. In 2011, the tournament was modified to eliminate the final stage as the previous winner, Místico, did not work for CMLL at that point in time The 2017 edition of La Leyenda de Plata was the 15th overall tournament held by CMLL.

=== Storylines ===
The events featured a number of professional wrestling matches with different wrestlers involved in pre-existing scripted feuds, plots and storylines. Wrestlers were portrayed as either heels (referred to as rudos in Mexico, those that portray the "bad guys") or faces (técnicos in Mexico, the "good guy" characters) as they followed a series of tension-building events, which culminated in a wrestling match or series of matches.

== Tournament overview ==
=== Cibernetico ===
#	Eliminated	Eliminated by
1	Puma	Sansón
2	The Panther	Soberano Jr.
3	Tiger	Forastero
4	Virus	Dragon Lee
5	Guerrero Maya Jr.	Titán
6	Forastero	Mephisto
7	Titán	Negro Casas
8	Negro Casas	Bárbaro Cavernario
9	Mephisto	Volador Jr.
10	Dragon Lee	Sansón
11	Bárbaro Cavernario	Soberano Jr.
12	Mistico or Soberano Jr. (Note: Soberano and Mistico were eliminated at the same time making it unclear who was pinned first.)	Sansón
13	Soberano Jr. or Mistico	Sansón
14	Sansón	Carístico
15	Carístico	Winner
16	Volador Jr.	Winner

== Results ==
=== October 13, 2017 ===
No.	Results	Stipulations
1	Esfinge and Drone defeated Raziel and Cancerbero	Best two-out-of-three falls tag team match
2	Ángel de Oro, Niebla Roja and Stuka Jr. defeated Rey Bucanero, Gran Guerrero and Luciferno	Best two-out-of-three falls six-man tag team match
3	Valiente defeated Pierroth	Lighting Match
4	Rush and Los Guerreros Lagunero (Último Guerrero and Euforia) defeated Marco Corleone, Kraneo and Diamante Azul	Best two-out-of-three falls six-man tag team match
5	Carístico and Volador Jr. won the torneo cibernetico after Cavernario, Virus, Mephisto, Titán, Tiger, Negro Casas, Dragon Lee, Soberano Jr., Forastero, The Panther, Guerrero Maya Jr., Mistico, Puma, Sansón were eliminated	2017 Leyenda de Plata semi-final, 16-man torneo cibernetico elimination match

=== October 20, 2017 ===
No.	Results	Stipulations
1	Disturbio and Sangre Azteca defeated Oro Jr. and Star Jr.	Best two-out-of-three falls tag team match
2	Misterioso Jr., Pólvora, and El Sagrado defeated Guerrero Maya Jr., Pegasso, and Rey Cometa	Best two-out-of-three falls six-man tag team match
3	Nueva Generación Dinamita (El Cuatrero, Forastero, and Sansón) defeated Ángel de Oro, Niebla Roja, and Soberano Jr.	Best two-out-of-three falls six-man tag team match
4	Negro Casas, Rey Bucanero, and El Terrible defeated Pierroth, Rush, and Sam Adonis by disqualification	Best two-out-of-three falls six-man tag team match
5	Mephisto and Los Guerreros Laguneros (Gran Guerrero and Último Guerrero) defeated Diamante Azul, Místico, and Valiente	Best two-out-of-three falls six-man tag team match
6	Volador Jr. defeated Carístico	2017 Leyenda de Plata tournament final
