= CMLL 84th Anniversary Show =

Mexican professional wrestling supercard show

- Official poster for the 84th anniversary show
- Promotion: Consejo Mundial de Lucha Libre
- Date: September 16, 2017
- City: Mexico City, Mexico
- Venue: Arena México

Event chronology
← Previous; International Gran Prix	Next → Leyenda de Plata

CMLL Anniversary Shows chronology
← Previous; 83rd Anniversary	Next → 85th Anniversary

The CMLL 84th Anniversary Show (Spanish: 84. Aniversario de CMLL) was a professional wrestling pay-per-view event scripted and produced by the lucha libre wrestling company Consejo Mundial de Lucha Libre (CMLL; Spanish for "World Wrestling Council") that took place on September 16, 2017, in CMLL's home arena Arena México in Mexico City, Mexico. The show is the biggest show of the year for CMLL, considered their version of the Super Bowl or WrestleMania. The CMLL Anniversary Show is the longest-running annual professional wrestling show.

The show featured two separate Lucha de Apuestas, or "bet matches". In the first match Zeuxis defeated Princesa Sugehit, forcing her to take off her mask, and the second match saw Gran Guerrero defeat Niebla Roja to unmask him. The show featured four additional matches. Flip Gordon worked on the undercard, representing the US-based Ring of Honor through their working relationship with CMLL and Satoshi Kojima worked on the undercard with Gordon, representing the Japanese-based New Japan Pro-Wrestling through their working relationship with CMLL.

== Production ==
=== Background ===
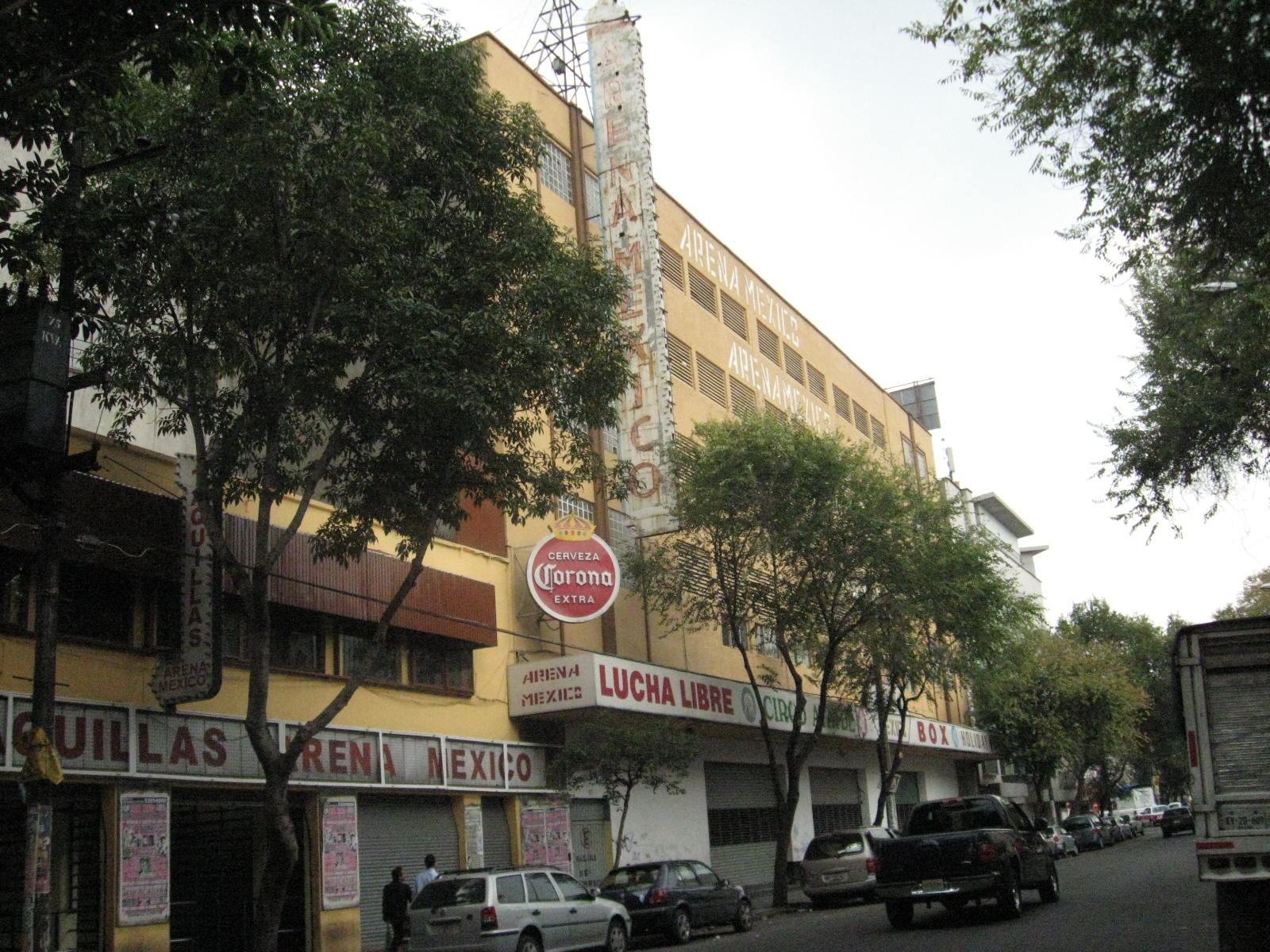
Arena México, CMLL's main venue and location of the 84th Anniversary Show

The Mexican Lucha libre (professional wrestling) company Consejo Mundial de Lucha Libre (CMLL) started under the name Empresa Mexicana de Lucha Libre ("Mexican Wrestling Company"; EMLL), founded by Salvador Lutteroth in 1933. Lutteroth, inspired by professional wrestling shows he had attended in Texas, decided to become a wrestling promoter and held his first show on September 21, 1933, marking what would be the beginning of organized professional wrestling in Mexico. Lutteroth would later become known as "the father of Lucha Libre" . A year later EMLL held the EMLL 1st Anniversary Show, starting the annual tradition of the Consejo Mundial de Lucha Libre Anniversary Shows that have been held each year ever since, most commonly in September. Over the years the anniversary show would become the biggest show of the year for CMLL, akin to the Super Bowl for the National Football League (NFL) or WWE's WrestleMania event. The first anniversary show was held in Arena Modelo, which Lutteroth had bought after starting EMLL. In 1942–43 Lutteroth financed the construction of Arena Coliseo, which opened in April 1943. The EMLL 10th Anniversary Show was the first of the anniversary shows to be held in Arena Coliseo. In 1956 Lutteroth had Arena México built in the location of the original Arena Modelo, making Arena México the main venue of EMLL from that point on. Starting with the EMLL 23rd Anniversary Show, all anniversary shows except for the EMLL 46th Anniversary Show have been held in the arena that would become known as "The Cathedral of Lucha Libre". On occasion EMLL held more than one show labelled as their "Anniversary" show, such as two 33rd Anniversary Shows in 1966. Over time the anniversary show series became the oldest, longest-running annual professional wrestling show. In comparison, WWE's WrestleMania is only the fourth oldest still-promoted show (after CMLL's Arena Coliseo Anniversary Show and Arena México anniversary shows). EMLL was supposed to hold the EMLL 52nd Anniversary Show on September 20, 1985 but Mexico City was hit by a magnitude 8.0 earthquake. EMLL canceled the event both because of the general devastation but also over fears that Arena México might not be structurally sound after the earthquake.

When Jim Crockett Promotions was bought by Ted Turner in 1988 EMLL became the oldest still active promotion in the world. In 1991 EMLL was rebranded as "Consejo Mundial de Lucha Libre" and thus held the CMLL 59th Anniversary Show, the first under the new name, on September 18, 1992. Traditionally CMLL holds their major events on Friday Nights, replacing their regularly scheduled Super Viernes show. The 2017 show will commemorate the 84th anniversary of CMLL and will, against tradition, be held on a Saturday instead of a Friday. The September 16 date coincides with the Mexican Independence Day celebrations.

=== Storylines ===
The 84th Anniversary Show featured six professional wrestling matches scripted by CMLL with some wrestlers involved in scripted feuds. The wrestlers portray either heels (referred to as rudos in Mexico, those that play the part of the "bad guys") or faces (técnicos in Mexico, the "good guy" characters) as they perform.

== Results ==
No.	Results	Stipulations	Times
1	Hechicero and Los Revolucionarios del Terror (Dragón Rojo Jr. and Pólvora) defeated Stuka Jr. and Los Panthers (Blue Panther Jr. and The Panther)	Best two-out-of-three falls six-man "Lucha Libre rules" tag team match	21:23
2	Marco Corleone, Diamante Azul and Valiente defeated Nueva Generación Dinamita (El Cuatrero, Forastero and Sansón)	Best two-out-of-three falls six-man "Lucha Libre rules" tag team match	13:21
3	La Peste Negra (Negro Casas, El Felino and Bárbaro Cavernario) defeated Sam Adonis, Kraneo and Rush	Best two-out-of-three falls six-man "Lucha Libre rules" tag team match	09:21
4	Zeuxis defeated Princesa Sugehit	Best two-out-of-three falls Lucha de Apuestas, mask vs. mask match	20:49
5	Volador Jr., Flip Gordon and Carístico defeated Kojima, Mephisto and Último Guerrero	Best two-out-of-three falls six-man "Lucha Libre rules" tag team match	16:04
6	Gran Guerrero defeated Niebla Roja	Best two-out-of-three falls Lucha de Apuestas, mask vs. mask match	18:38
