= Leyenda de Plata (2015) =

Mexican professional wrestling tournament

- Official poster for the first part of the Leyenda de Plata tournament
- Promotion: Consejo Mundial de Lucha Libre
- Date: May 15, 2015; May 22, 2015
- City: Mexico City, Mexico
- Venue: Arena México

Event chronology
← Previous; Reyes del Aire	Next → En Busca de un Ídolo

Leyenda de Plata chronology
← Previous; 2014	Next → 2016

The Leyenda de Plata (2015) was professional wrestling tournament produced by the Mexican wrestling promotion Consejo Mundial de Lucha Libre (CMLLl; Spanish "World Wrestling Council") that ran from May 15, 2015, over the course of two of CMLL's Friday night shows in Arena México with the finals on May 22, 2015. The annual Leyenda de Plata tournament is held in honor of lucha libre legend El Santo and is one of CMLL's most important annual tournaments.

The participants of the first round were: Bárbaro Cavernario, Dragon Lee, Fuego, Kamaitachi, Luciferno, Mephisto, Místico, Niebla Roja, The Panther, Titán, Virus and Volador Jr. In the end Dragon Lee pinned Virus to win the torneo cibernetico, which meant he would face the previous year's winner Negro Casas the following week. On May 22, Casas defeated Dragon Lee in the finals to win the tournament.

== Production ==
=== Background ===
The Leyenda de Plata (Spanish for "the Silver Legend") is an annual lucha libre tournament scripted and promoted by the Mexican professional wrestling promotion Consejo Mundial de Lucha Libre (CMLL). The first Leyenda de Plata was held in 1998 and was in honor of El Santo, nicknamed Enmáscarado de Plata (the Silver mask) from which the tournament got its name. The trophy given to the winner is a plaque with a metal replica of the mask that El Santo wore in both wrestling and lucha films.

The Leyenda de Plata was held annually until 2003, at which point El Santo's son, El Hijo del Santo left CMLL on bad terms. The tournament returned in 2004 and has been held on an almost annual basis since then. The original format of the tournament was the Torneo cibernetico elimination match to qualify for a semi-final. The winner of the semi-final would face the winner of the previous year's tournament in the final. Since 2005 CMLL has held two cibernetico matches and the winner of each then meet in the semi-final. In 2011, the tournament was modified to eliminate the final stage as the previous winner, Místico, did not work for CMLL at that point in time The 2015 edition of La Leyenda de Plata was the 13th overall tournament held by CMLL.

=== Storylines ===
The events featured a total of number of professional wrestling matches with different wrestlers involved in pre-existing scripted feuds, plots and storylines. Wrestlers were portrayed as either heels (referred to as rudos in Mexico, those that portray the "bad guys") or faces (técnicos in Mexico, the "good guy" characters) as they followed a series of tension-building events, which culminated in a wrestling match or series of matches.

== Tournament overview ==
=== Cibernetico ===
#	Eliminated	Eliminated by
1	Fuego	Niebla Roja
2	The Panther	Bárbaro Cavernario
3	Niebla Roja	Titán
4	Mephisto	Volador Jr.
5	Volador Jr.	Mephisto
6	Kamaitachi	Místico
7	Titán	Luciferno
8	Bárbaro Cavernario	Dragon Lee
9	Luciferno	Místico
10	Místico	Virus
11	Virus	Dragon Lee
12	Winner	Dragon Lee

== Results ==
=== May 15, 2015 ===
No.	Results	Stipulations
1	Hombre Bala Jr. and Súper Halcón, Jr. defeated Akuma and Espíritu Negro	Best two-out-of-three falls tag team match
2	Estrellita and Marcela defeated Dalys la Caribeña and Tiffany	Best two-out-of-three falls tag team match
3	Atlantis, Marco Corleone, and Máximo defeated El Felino, Negro Casas, and Thunder	Best two-out-of-three falls six-man tag team match
4	Los Guerreros Laguneros Euforia, Gran Guerrero, and Último Guerrero defeated Los Revolucionarios del Muerte (Dragón Rojo Jr., Pólvora, and Rey Escorpión)	Best two-out-of-three falls six-man tag team match
5	Dragon Lee defeated Místico, Volador Jr., Titán, The Panther, Fuego, Mephisto, Niebla Roja, Bárbaro Cavernario, Virus, Luciferno, and Kamaitachi	2015 Leyenda de Plata semi-final, 16-man torneo cibernetico elimination match

=== May 22, 2015 ===
No.	Results	Stipulations
1	Demus 3:16 and Pequeño Violencia defeated Shockercito and Último Dragóncito	Best two-out-of-three falls tag team match
2	Pegasso, Stigma, and Tritón defeated Disturbio and Los Hombres del Camuflaje (Artillero and Súper Comando)	Best two-out-of-three falls six-man tag team match
3	La Amapola, Dalys la Caribeña and La Seductora defeated Goya Kong and Lluvia, Silueta	Best two-out-of-three falls six-man tag team match
4	Dragón Rojo Jr., Pólvora, and Rey Escorpión defeated Gran Guerrero, Mephisto, and Niebla Roja	Best two-out-of-three falls six-man tag team match
5	Negro Casas defeated Dragon Lee	2015 Leyenda de Plata finals
6	Euforia, Thunder, and Último Guerrero defeated Marco Corleone, and Máximo, Volador Jr.	Best two-out-of-three falls six-man tag team match
