= Leyenda de Plata (2018) =

Mexican professional wrestling tournament

- Official poster for the Leyenda de Plata finals on November 23, 2018
- Promotion: Consejo Mundial de Lucha Libre
- Date: November 16, 2018; November 23, 2018
- City: Mexico City
- Venue: Arena México

Event chronology
← Previous; Día de Muertos	Next → Leyendas Mexicanas

Leyenda de Plata chronology
← Previous; 2017	Next → —

The Leyenda de Plata (2018) was professional wrestling tournament produced by the Mexican wrestling promotion Consejo Mundial de Lucha Libre (CMLLl; Spanish "World Wrestling Council") that ran from November 16, 2018, over the course of two of CMLL's Friday night shows in Arena México with the finals on November 23, 2018. The annual Leyenda de Plata tournament is held in honor of lucha libre legend El Santo and is one of CMLL's most important annual tournaments.

For the first part of the Leyenda de Plata tournament King Phoenix and Bárbaro Cavernario outlasted a field of 16 in a torneo cibernetico elimination match that also included Audaz, Dragón Rojo Jr., El Felino, Flyer, Kawato-San, Mephisto, Místico, Soberano Jr., Templario, Tiger, Titán, Tritón, Virus, and Volador Jr. on the November 16 Super Viernes show. The following week Cavernario defeated King Phoenix, two falls to one, to win the 2018 Leyenda de Plata tournament. The November 24, 2018 Super Viernes also celebrated the 40th anniversary of Máscara Año 2000's debut.

== Production ==
=== Background ===
The Leyenda de Plata (Spanish for "the Silver Legend") is an annual lucha libre tournament scripted and promoted by the Mexican professional wrestling promotion Consejo Mundial de Lucha Libre (CMLL). The first Leyenda de Plata was held in 1998 and was in honor of El Santo, nicknamed Enmáscarado de Plata (the Silver mask) from which the tournament got its name. The trophy given to the winner is a plaque with a metal replica of the mask that El Santo wore in both wrestling and lucha films.

The Leyenda de Plata was held annually until 2003, at which point El Santo's son, El Hijo del Santo left CMLL on bad terms. The tournament returned in 2004 and has been held on an almost annual basis since then. The original format of the tournament was the Torneo cibernetico elimination match to qualify for a semi-final. The winner of the semi-final would face the winner of the previous year's tournament in the final. Since 2005 CMLL has held two cibernetico matches and the winner of each then meet in the semi-final. In 2011, the tournament was modified to eliminate the final stage as the previous winner, Místico, did not work for CMLL at that point in time The 2018 edition of La Leyenda de Plata was the 16th overall tournament held by CMLL.

=== Storylines ===
The events featured a total of twelve professional wrestling matches with different wrestlers involved in pre-existing scripted feuds, plots and storylines. Wrestlers were portrayed as either heels (referred to as rudos in Mexico, those that portray the "bad guys") or faces (técnicos in Mexico, the "good guy" characters) as they followed a series of tension-building events, which culminated in a wrestling match or series of matches.

== Torneo Cibernetico overview ==
Rank|#	Eliminated	Eliminated by	Time
1	Kawato-San	Audaz	07:56
2	Tiger	Templario	09:35
3	Tritón	Dragón Rojo Jr.	12:20
4	Audaz	Soberano Jr.	13:28
5	Flyer	Virus	14:51
6	Titán	El Felino	18:19
7	Virus	Mephisto	19:20
8	Dragón Rojo Jr.	Bárbaro Cavernario	20:43
9	El Felino	Soberano Jr.	21:27
10	Templario	Volador Jr.	23:01
11	Mephisto	King Phoenix	24:34
12	Soberano Jr.	Bárbaro Cavernario	25:25
13	Místico	Volador Jr.	28:50
14	Volador Jr.	Bárbaro Cavernario	34:52
15	Bárbaro Cavernario and King Phoenix (winners)		34:52

== Results ==
=== November 16, 2018 ===
No.	Results	Stipulations	Times
1	Espanto Jr. and Grako defeated Astral and Eléctrico	Best two-out-of-three falls tag team match	13:30
2	La Guerrera, Lluvia, and Marcela defeated La Amapola, Dalys, and Tiffany by disqualification	Six-man "Lucha Libre rules" tag team match	11:33
3	Misterioso Jr., Okumura, and Vangellys defeated Esfinge, Guerrero Maya Jr., and Rey Cometa	Six-man "Lucha Libre rules" tag team match	—
4	Bárbaro Cavernario, Audaz, El Felino, King Phoenix, Tiger, Tritón, Virus, and Volador Jr. defeated Dragón Rojo Jr., Flyer, Kawato-San, Mephisto, Místico, Soberano Jr., Templario, and Titán	2018 Leyenda de Plata seeding battle royal	—
5	Bárbaro Cavernario and King Phoenix defeated Volador Jr., Titán, Flyer, Místico, Soberano Jr., Tritón, Audaz, Dragón Rojo Jr., El Felino, Virus, Mephisto, Templario, Kawato-San, and Tiger	16-man, 2018 Leyenda de Plata torneo cibernetico elimination match	34:52
6	Penta 0M and Los Guerreros Laguneros (Gran Guerrero and Último Guerrero_ defeated Carístico, Diamante Azul, and Valiente	Six-man "Lucha Libre rules" tag team match	09:42

=== November 23, 2018 ===
No.	Results	Stipulations	Times
1	Akuma and Espanto Jr. defeated Oro Jr. and Súper Astro Jr.	Best two-out-of-three falls tag team match	11:39
2	Black Panther, Blue Panther Jr., and Fuego defeated Kawato-San, Okumura, and Universo 2000 Jr.	Six-man "Lucha Libre rules" tag team match	12:38
3	Soberano Jr., Titán, and Tritón defeated Dark Magic, Luciferno, and Vangellys	Six-man "Lucha Libre rules" tag team match	09:37
4	Carístico, Místico, and Volador Jr. defeated Los Hijos del Infierno (Ephesto and Mephisto) and Penta 0M	Six-man "Lucha Libre rules" tag team match	11:11
5	Bárbaro Cavernario defeated King Phoenix	Best two-out-of-three falls match, 2018 Leyenda de Plata finals	20:26
6	Nueva Generación Dinamita (El Cuatrero, Forastero, and Sansón) and Máscara Año 2000 defeated Los Guerreros Laguneros (Euforia, Gran Guerrero, Templario, and Último Guerrero)	Six-man "Lucha Libre rules" tag team match	11:10
