= Leyenda de Plata (2014) =

Mexican professional wrestling tournament

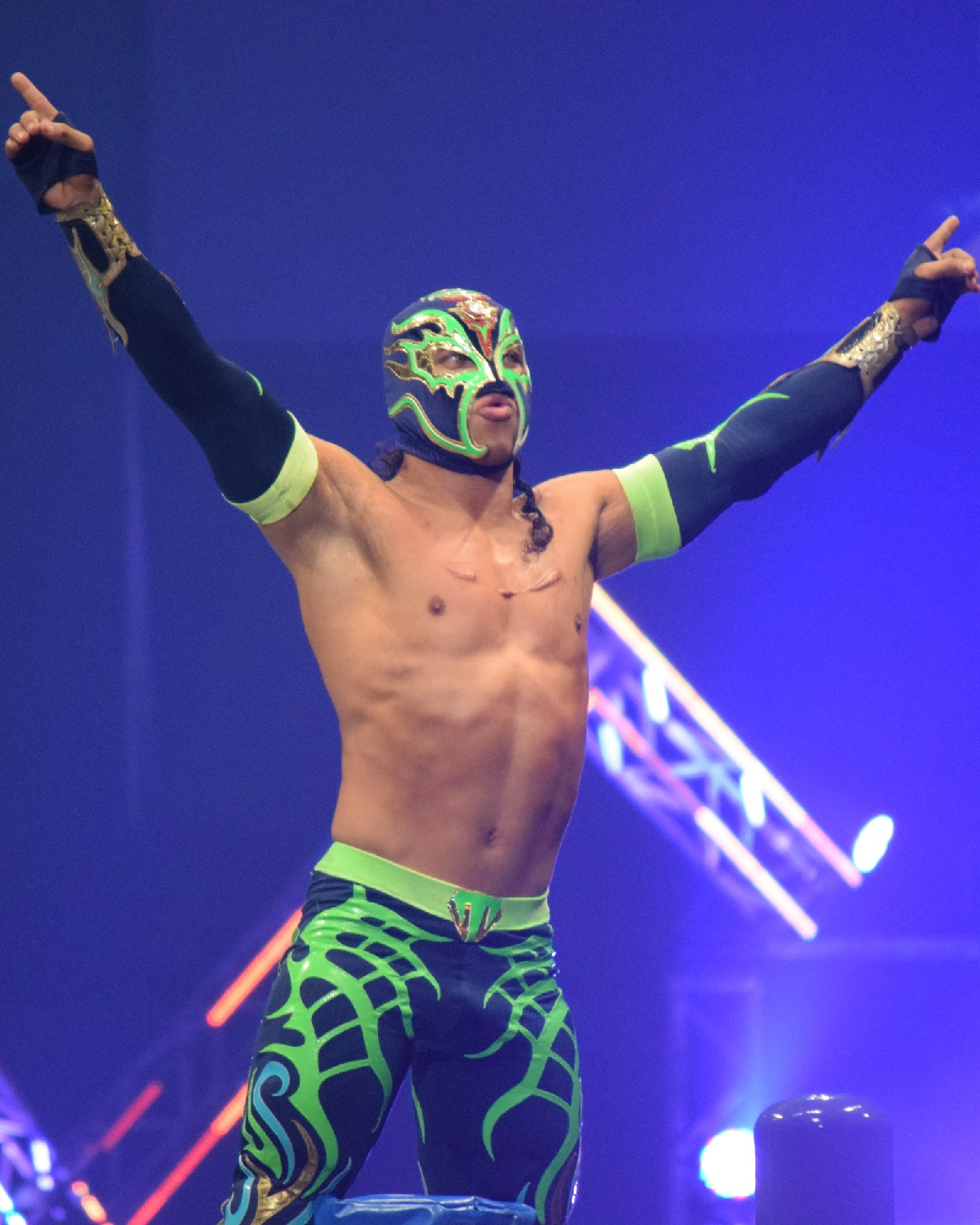
- Tournament finalist Titán
- Promotion: Consejo Mundial de Lucha Libre
- Date: December 20, 2013; December 27, 2013; January 3, 2014
- City: Mexico City, Mexico
- Venue: Arena México

Event chronology
← Previous; CMLL 80th Anniversary Show	Next → La Copa Junior

Leyenda de Plata chronology
← Previous; 2011	Next → 2015

The Leyenda de Plata (2014) was professional wrestling tournament produced by the Mexican wrestling promotion Consejo Mundial de Lucha Libre (CMLLl; Spanish "World Wrestling Council") that ran from December 20, 2013, over the course of three of CMLL's Friday night shows in Arena México with the finals on January 3, 2014. The annual Leyenda de Plata tournament is held in honor of lucha libre legend El Santo and is one of CMLL's most important annual tournaments.

After a two-year hiatus the Leyenda de Plata tournament returned in late 2013 with two qualifying Torneo cibernetico elimination matches and a final match between each elimination match winner. The first match took place on December 20, 2013, as part of CMLL's Super Viernes show and was won by Titán. The second torneo was won by Negro Casas a week later. On January 3, Casas defeated Titán to win the tournament.

== Production ==
=== Background ===
The Leyenda de Plata (Spanish for "the Silver Legend") is an annual lucha libre tournament scripted and promoted by the Mexican professional wrestling promotion Consejo Mundial de Lucha Libre (CMLL). The first Leyenda de Plata was held in 1998 and was in honor of El Santo, nicknamed Enmáscarado de Plata (the Silver mask) from which the tournament got its name. The trophy given to the winner is a plaque with a metal replica of the mask that El Santo wore in both wrestling and lucha films.

The Leyenda de Plata was held annually until 2003, at which point El Santo's son, El Hijo del Santo left CMLL on bad terms. The tournament returned in 2004 and has been held on an almost annual basis since then. The original format of the tournament was the Torneo cibernetico elimination match to qualify for a semi-final. The winner of the semi-final would face the winner of the previous year's tournament in the final. Since 2005 CMLL has held two cibernetico matches and the winner of each then meet in the semi-final. In 2011, the tournament was modified to eliminate the final stage as the previous winner, Místico, did not work for CMLL at that point in time The 2014 edition of La Leyenda de Plata was the 12th overall tournament held by CMLL.

=== Storylines ===
The events featured a total of professional wrestling matches with different wrestlers involved in pre-existing scripted feuds, plots and storylines. Wrestlers were portrayed as either heels (referred to as rudos in Mexico, those that portray the "bad guys") or faces (técnicos in Mexico, the "good guy" characters) as they followed a series of tension-building events, which culminated in a wrestling match or series of matches.

== Tournament overview ==
=== Cibernetico 1 (December 20, 2013) ===
#	Eliminated	Eliminated by
1	Okumura	Delta
2	Tritón	Tiger
3	Olímpico	Atlantis
4	Tiger	Atlantis
5	Atlantis	Averno
6	Delta	Virus
7	El Felino	La Máscara
8	Stuka Jr.	Virus
9	Virus	Disqualification
10	La Máscara	Disqualification
11	Averno	Titán
12	Winner	Titán

=== Cibernetico 2 (December 27, 2013) ===
#	Eliminated	Eliminated by
1	Pegasso	Pólvora
2	Fuego	Rey Escorpión
3	Pólvora	Máximo
4	Puma	Blue Panther
5	Guerrero Maya Jr.	Negro Casas
6	Blue Panther	Reaper
7	Reaper	Valiente
8	Máximo	Rey Escorpión
9	Valiente	Mephisto
10	Mephisto	Rey Escorpión
11	Rey Escorpión	Negro Casas
12	Winner	Negro Casas

== Results ==
=== December 20, 2013 ===
No.	Results	Stipulations
1	Leono and Pegasso defeated Los Cancerberos del Infierno (Cancerbero and Raziel)	Best two-out-of-three falls tag team match
2	Fuego, Guerrero Maya Jr., and El Sagrado defeated Boby Zavala, Misterioso Jr., and Puma	Best two-out-of-three falls six-man tag team match
3	Blue Panther, Máximo, and Brazo de Oro defeated Dragón Rojo Jr., Mr. Niebla, and Negro Casas by disqualification	Best two-out-of-three falls six-man tag team match
4	Titán defeated Atlantis, Averno, La Máscara, Olímpico, Delta, El Felino, Tritón, Tiger, Stuka Jr., Okumura, and Virus	2014 Leyenda de Plata qualifier, 16-man torneo cibernetico elimination match
5	Volador Jr. defeated Reapper	Best two-out-of-three falls match

=== December 27, 2013 ===
No.	Results	Stipulations
1	Oro Jr. and Sensei defeated Los Hombres del Camuflaje (Artillero and Súper Comando)	Best two-out-of-three falls tag team match
2	Los Cancerberos del Infierno (Cancerbero and Raziel) and Sangre Azteca defeated Hombre Bala Jr., Súper Halcón, Jr., and Tritón	Best two-out-of-three falls six-man tag team match
3	La Amapola, Dalys la Caribeña, and Tiffany defeated Estrellita, Goya Kong, and Silueta	Best two-out-of-three falls six-man tag team match
4	Negro Casas defeated Blue Panther, Guerrero Maya Jr., Valiente, Fuego, Máximo, Pegasso, Rey Escorpión, Mephisto, Pólvora, Reapper, and Puma	2014 Leyenda de Plata qualifier, 16-man torneo cibernetico elimination match
5	Atlantis, Brazo de Oro, and Volador Jr. defeated Rey Bucanero, El Terrible, and Vangellys by disqualification	Best two-out-of-three falls six-man tag team match

=== January 3, 2014 ===
No.	Results	Stipulations
1	Pequeño Violencia and Pequeño Black Warrior defeated Fantasy and Pequeño Halcón	Best two-out-of-three falls tag team match
2	Starman, Stigma, and Tritón defeated Arkángel de la Muerte, Hooligan, and Nitro	Best two-out-of-three falls six-man tag team match
3	Fuego, Guerrero Maya Jr., and Stuka Jr. defeated Boby Zavala, Okumura, and Virus by disqualification	Best two-out-of-three falls six-man tag team match
4	Máximo, Shocker, and Brazo de Oro defeated Rey Bucanero, El Terrible, and Tiger	Best two-out-of-three falls six-man tag team match
5	Negro Casas defeated Titán	2014 Leyenda de Plata finals
6	Máscara Dorada, Valiente, and Volador Jr. defeated Averno, Mephisto, and Último Guerrero	Best two-out-of-three falls six-man tag team match
