= List of CMLL World Welterweight Champions =

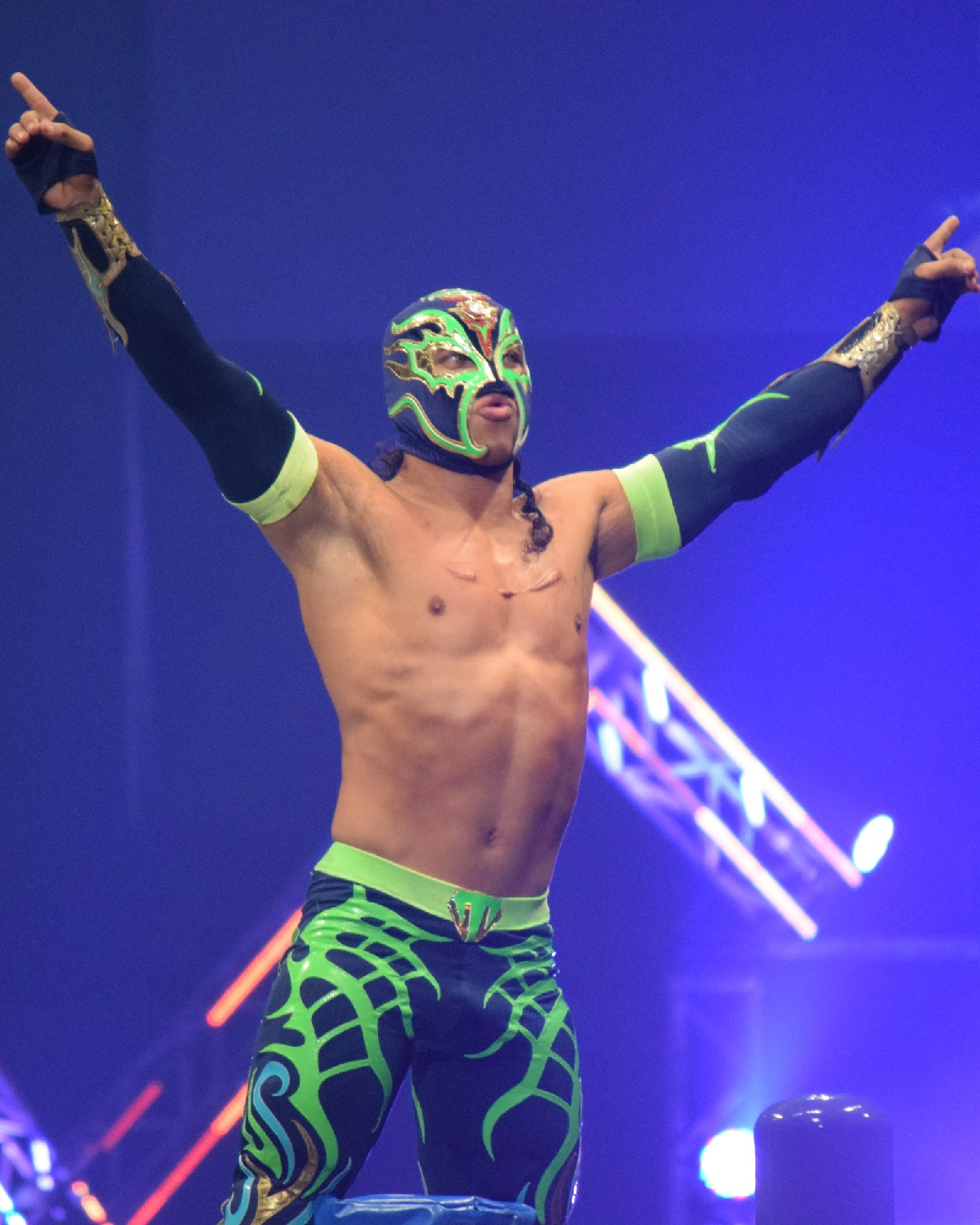
Current champion Titán

The CMLL World Welterweight Championship (Campeonato Mundial de Peso Welter CMLL in Spanish) is a professional wrestling world championship promoted by the Mexican Lucha Libre wrestling-based promotion Consejo Mundial de Lucha Libre (CMLL) since 1992. As it is a professional wrestling championship, it is not won legitimately; it is instead won via a scripted ending to a match or awarded to a wrestler because of a storyline. The official definition of the Welterweight weight class in Mexico is between 70 kg (150 lb) and 78 kg (172 lb), but is not always strictly enforced. (Note: The most recent case of this is Mephisto holding the NWA World Welterweight Championship, a belt with a 78 kg (172 lb) upper limit, despite weighing 90 kg (200 lb).) Because Lucha Libre emphasizes the lower weight classes, this division is considered more important than the normally more prestigious heavyweight division of a promotion. All title matches take place under two out of three falls rules.

The first champion to be recognized by CMLL was Fuerza Guerrera, who defeated El Khalifa in the finals of a four-man tournament that took place on February 15, 1992. In addition to being the first champion, Fuerza Guerrera is the individual to have held the championship the shortest time, at 22 days. Mephisto holds the record for the longest individual title reign, at 1,141 days, as well as the longest combined reign, 2,191 days in total.^{[G]} Titán is the current champion; he is on his first reign as CMLL World Welterweight Champion and is the 34th overall champion. He defeated Soberano Jr. on December 8, 2019, to win the title. In 1996, then reigning champion El Pantera planned on leaving CMLL to join their main rival AAA; before doing so he lost the CMLL Welterweight Title to Super Delfin in a match not sanctioned by CMLL. As CMLL knew that Pantera was leaving they used the opportunity to vacate the title, stating that Super Delfin's claim to the title was void. After El Felino became the CMLL-endorsed champion, he defeated Super Delfin to ensure that there was only one undisputed CMLL World Welterweight Champion.

== Title history ==
Key
| No. | Overall reign number |
| Reign | Reign number for the specific champion |
| Days | Number of days held |
| N/A | Unknown information |
| + | Current reign is changing daily |

| No. | Champion | Championship change | | | Reign statistics | | Notes | Ref. |
| No. | Champion | Date | Event | Location | Reign | Days | Notes | Ref. |
|---|---|---|---|---|---|---|---|---|
Consejo Mundial de Lucha Libre (CMLL)
| 1 | Fuerza Guerrera | February 15, 1992 | Sabados Arena Puebla | Puebla, Puebla | 1 | 22 | Defeated El Khalifa in the finals of a four-man tournament | ^{[G]} |
| 2 | América | March 8, 1992 | Domingos de Coliseo | Mexico City, Distrito Federal | 1 | 131 | América later held the title as Pantera and then Pantera II. | ^{[G]} |
| 3 | El Felino | July 17, 1992 | Live event | Cuernavaca, Morelos | 1 | 308 | | ^{[G]} |
| 4 | Ciclón Ramírez | May 21, 1993 | Live event | Mexico City, Distrito Federal | 1 | 313 | | ^{[G]} |
| 5 | El Felino | March 30, 1994 | Live event | Acapulco, Guerrero | 2 | 83 | | ^{[G]} |
| 6 | El Pantera | June 21, 1994 | Live event | Cuernavaca, Morelos | 2 | 633 | | ^{[G]} |
| — | Vacated | March 15, 1996 | — | — | — | — | Championship vacated when Pantera lost the title to Super Delfin without it being sanctioned by CMLL. | ^{[G]} |
| 7 | Máscara Mágica | May 21, 1996 | Martes de Coliseo | Mexico City, Distrito Federal | 1 | 73 | Defeated El Felino in the finals of a 16-man tournament. | ^{[G]} |
| 8 | Guerrero de la Muerte | August 2, 1996 | Live event | Mexico City, Distrito Federal | 1 | (Note: The exact date on which Guerrero de la Muerte lost the championship is not known, which means the title reign lasted between 517 and 547 days.) | | ^{[G]} |
| 9 | Máscara Mágica | January 1998 | Live event | N/A | 2 | (Note: The exact date on which Máscara Magica won the championship is not known, which means the title reign lasted between 6 and 36 days and his combined reigns at 79 days, at the least.) | | ^{[G]} |
| 10 | Karloff Lagarde Jr. | February 6, 1998 | Live event | Mexico City, Distrito Federal | 1 | 221 | | ^{[G]} |
| 11 | Olímpico | September 15, 1998 | Martes de Coliseo | Mexico City, Distrito Federal | 1 | 38 | | ^{[G]} |
| 12 | Halcón Negro | October 23, 1998 | CMLL Super Viernes | Mexico City, Distrito Federal | 1 | 51 | | ^{[G]} |
| 13 | Olímpico | December 13, 1998 | Live event | Mexico City, Distrito Federal | 2 | 76 | | ^{[G]} |
| 14 | Super Delfin | February 27, 1999 | Live event | Nagoya, Japan | 1 | 164 | | ^{[G]} |
| 15 | Arkangel de la Muerte | August 10, 1999 | Live event | Kawasaki, Japan | 1 | (Note: The exact date on which Arkangel de la Muerte lost the championship is not known, which means the title reign lasted between 875 and 905 days.) | | ^{[G]} |
| 16 | Nosawa | January 2001 | Live event | Acapulco, Guerrero | 1 | (Note: The exact date on which Nosawa won the championship is not known, which means the title reign lasted between 30 and 60 days and his combined reigns 203 days, at the least.) | | |
| 17 | Pantera II | March 2, 2001 | Live event | Acapulco, Guerrero | 3 | 31 | Won the title by forfeit due to Nosawa being injured. | |
| 18 | Nosawa | April 2, 2001 | Lunes Arena Puebla | Puebla, Puebla | 2 | 172 | | |
| 19 | El Felino | September 21, 2001 | CMLL Super Viernes | Mexico City, Distrito Federal | 3 | 795 | | |
| 20 | El Satánico | November 25, 2003 | Martes de Coliso | Mexico City, Distrito Federal | 1 | 91 | | |
| 21 | Mephisto | February 24, 2004 | Martes de Coliseo | Mexico City, Distrito Federal | 1 | 1,141 | | |
| 22 | Místico | April 10, 2007 | Guadalajara Martes | Guadalajara, Jalisco | 1 | 710 | | |
| 23 | Negro Casas | March 20, 2009 | Homenaje a Dos Leyendas | Mexico City, Mexico | 1 | 536 | | |
| 24 | Máscara Dorada | September 7, 2010 | CMLL Martes Arena Mexico | Mexico City, Mexico | 1 | 137 | | |
| 25 | Ryusuke Taguchi | January 22, 2011 | Fantastica Mania 2011 | Bunkyo, Tokyo, Japan | 1 | 147 | | |
| 26 | Máscara Dorada | June 18, 2011 | Dominion 6.18 | Osaka, Japan | 2 | 512 | This was a one fall match. | |
| 27 | Pólvora | November 11, 2012 | Domingos Arena Mexico | Mexico City, Mexico | 1 | 462 | | |
| 28 | Místico (II) | February 16, 2014 | Domingos Arena Mexico | Mexico City, Mexico | 1 | 276 | Not the same Místico who won the title in 2007. | |
| — | Vacated | November 19, 2014 | — | — | — | — | Vacated due to Místico suffering a severe injury from a motorcycle accident. | |
| 29 | Máscara Dorada | January 2, 2015 | CMLL Super Viernes | Mexico City, Mexico | 3 | 351 | Defeated Negro Casas in the finals of a tournament. | |
| 30 | Bushi | December 19, 2015 | Road to Tokyo Dome | Tokyo, Japan | 1 | 34 | This was a one fall match. | |
| 31 | Máscara Dorada | January 22, 2016 | Fantastica Mania 2016 | Tokyo, Japan | 4 | 103 | This was a one fall match. | |
| 32 | Mephisto | May 4, 2016 | CMLL Martes Arena Mexico | Mexico City, Distrito Federal | 2 | 1,049 | | |
| 33 | Dragon Lee | March 19, 2019 | CMLL Arena Mexico | Mexico City, Distrito Federal | 1 | 193 | | |
| — | Vacated | September 28, 2019 | — | — | — | — | Championship vacated when Dragon Lee was fired by CMLL | |
| 34 | Titán | December 8, 2019 | CMLL Arena Mexico | Mexico City, Distrito Federal | 1 | 2,261+ | Defeated Soberano Jr. in a tournament final to win the vacant championship | |

== Combined reigns ==
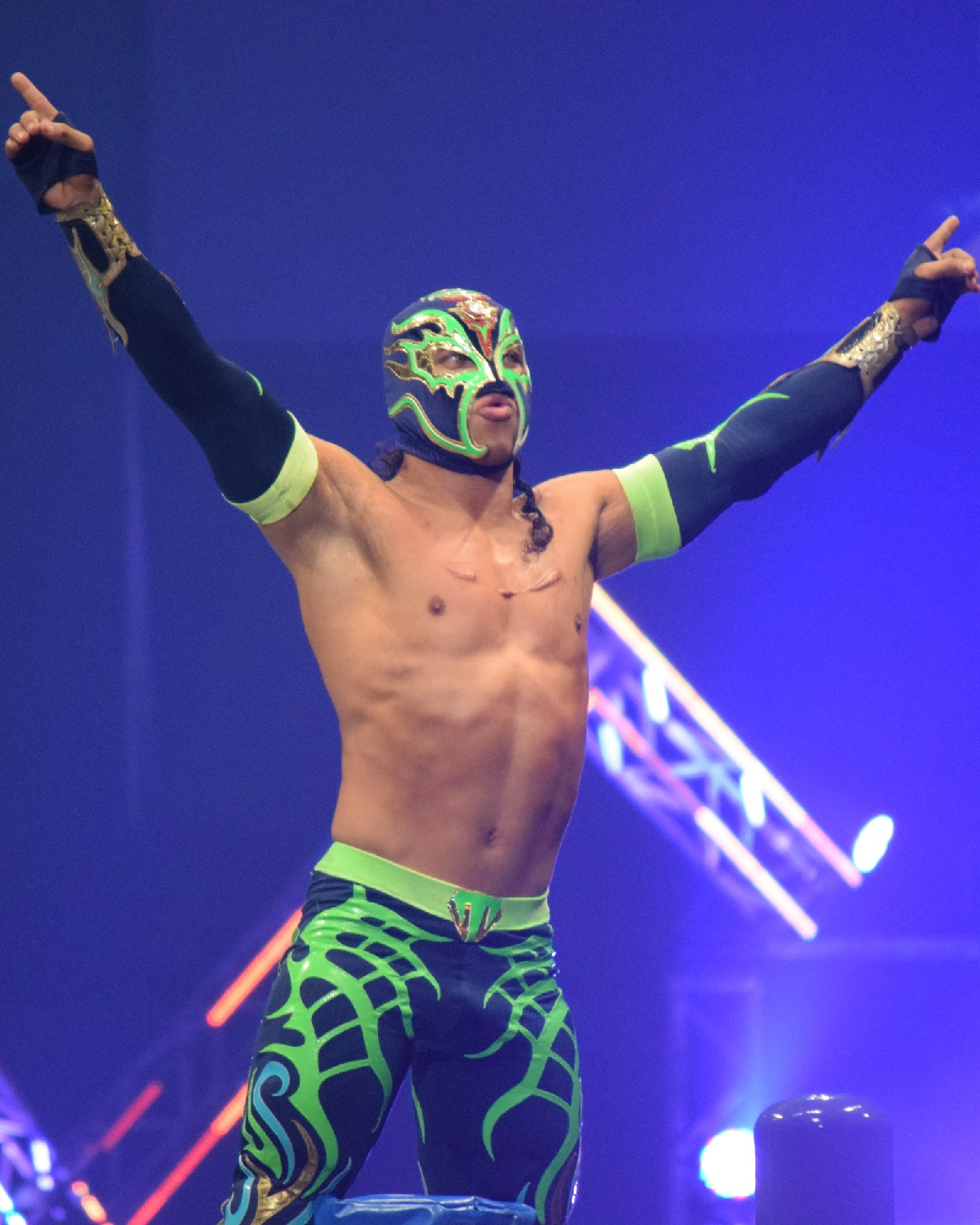
Current champion Titán

As of February 15, 2026.

| † | Indicates the current champion |
| ¤ | The exact length of the title reign is uncertain. |

| Rank | Wrestler | No. of reigns | Combined days | Refs. |
|---|---|---|---|---|
| 1 | Titán † | 1 | 2,261+ | |
| 2 | Mephisto | 2 | 2,191 | |
| 3 | El Felino | 3 | 1,186 | ^{[G]} |
| 4 | Máscara Dorada | 4 | 1,103 | |
| 5 | Arkangel de la Muerte | 1 | 875¤ | ^{[G]} |
| 6 | Pantera II | 3 | 795 | ^{[G]} |
| 7 | Místico | 1 | 710 | |
| 8 | Negro Casas | 1 | 536 | |
| 9 | Guerrero de la Muerte | 1 | 517¤ | ^{[G]} |
| 10 | Pólvora | 1 | 462 | |
| 11 | Ciclón Ramírez | 1 | 313 | ^{[G]} |
| 12 | Místico (II) | 1 | 277 | |
| 13 | Karloff Lagarde Jr. | 1 | 221 | ^{[G]} |
| 14 | Nosawa | 2 | 203¤ | ^{[G]} |
| 15 | Dragon Lee | 1 | 193 | |
| 16 | Super Delfin | 1 | 164 | ^{[G]} |
| 17 | Ryusuke Taguchi | 1 | 147 | |
| 18 | Olímpico | 2 | 114 | ^{[G]} |
| 19 | El Satánico | 1 | 91 | ^{[G]} |
| 20 | Máscara Mágica | 1 | 79¤ | ^{[G]} |
| 21 | Halcón Negro | 1 | 51 | ^{[G]} |
| 22 | Bushi | 1 | 34 | |
| 23 | Fuerza Guerrera | 1 | 22 | ^{[G]} |
