= Leyenda de Plata =

Recurring Mexican professional wrestling tournament

Leyenda de Plata Tournament
- The Leyenda de Plata trophy with the mask of El Santo on it.

Details
- Promotion: Consejo Mundial de Lucha Libre
- Date established: July 31, 1998
- Current champion: Máscara Dorada
- Date won: July 31, 2026
Statistics
- First champion: Scorpio Jr.
- Most reigns: Místico and Negro Casas (3)

The Leyenda de Plata (Spanish for "the Silver Legend") is an annual lucha libre tournament held by the Mexican professional wrestling promotion Consejo Mundial de Lucha Libre (CMLL). The tournament honors El Santo, Enmáscarado de Plata (the Silver Mask), and has been held almost every year since 1998, except for 2003 when El Hijo del Santo (El Santo's son) did not work for CMLL, and two brief hiatuses from 2009-2010 and 2019-2020. It is the most prestigious of all of CMLL's annual tournaments.

The original format of the tournament was a single Torneo cibernetico match, in which the last two wrestlers left would face off in a 1-on-1 semi-final. The winner of the semi-final would face the winner of the previous year's tournament in the finals. For the first year, El Hijo del Santo would wrestle in the final. The winner is given a plaque with a solid silver El Santo mask on it.

Starting in 2005, two Torneo cibernetico matches would be held, with one winner each; the winners would meet in the semi-final. The winner of the semi-final would still face the previous year's champion in the final. After a two-year hiatus, the tournament returned in 2011, and was modified to eliminate the final stage; instead the winners of the Torneo cibernetico matches would face off for the final. The tournament held another two-year hiatus in 2019-2020, and returned in 2021. The most Leyenda de Plata victories by a single wrestler is three, achieved by two different wrestlers; Místico in 2006, 2007 and 2008, and Negro Casas in 2000, 2014 and 2015.

== Tournament winners ==
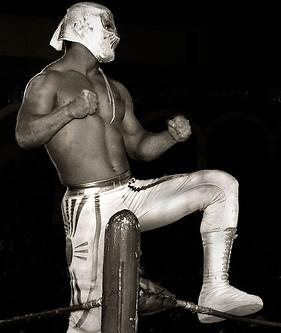
Místico, three times Leyenda de Plata winner

Year	Winner	Defeated	Date	Note
1998	Scorpio Jr.	El Hijo del Santo	July 31, 1998	
1999	El Hijo del Santo	Scorpio Jr.	December 3, 1999	
2000	Negro Casas	El Hijo del Santo	October 6, 2000	
2001	Black Warrior	Negro Casas	October 19, 2001	
2002	El Felino	Black Warrior	August 9, 2002	
2004	Perro Aguayo Jr.	El Felino	July 30, 2004	
2005	Atlantis	El Hijo del Santo	November 11, 2005	Perro Aguayo Jr. refused to defend the trophy.
2006	Místico	Atlantis	September 15, 2006	
2007	Místico (2)	Mr. Águila	June 8, 2007	
2008	Místico (3)	Perro Aguayo Jr.	July 25, 2008	
2011	Volador Jr.	Jushin Thunder Liger	October 7, 2011	
2014	Negro Casas (2)	Titán	January 3, 2014	
2015	Negro Casas (3)	Dragon Lee	May 22, 2015	
2016	La Máscara	Negro Casas	July 22, 2016	
2017	Volador Jr. (2)	Carístico	October 20, 2017	
2018	Bárbaro Cavernario	Fénix	November 23, 2018	
2021	Titán	Templario	July 30, 2021	
2022	Templario	Soberano Jr.	July 29, 2022	
2023	Máscara Dorada	Rocky Romero	July 28, 2023	
2024	Ángel de Oro	Star Jr.	July 26, 2024	
2025	Neón	Máscara Dorada	July 25, 2025	
2026	Máscara Dorada (2)	Komander	July 31, 2026	
