= Negro Casas =

Mexican professional wrestler (born 1960)

- Casas in 2013

Personal information
- Born: José Casas Ruiz; January 10, 1960 (age 66) Mexico City, Mexico
- Family: Casas; Dalys la Caribeña (m. 1990)

Professional wrestling career
- Ring name(s): Pepe Casas Jr. Negro Casas
- Billed height: 1.70 m (5 ft 7 in)
- Billed weight: 79 kg (174 lb)
- Billed from: Mexico City, Mexico
- Trained by: Pepe Casas; Raúl Reyes; Tony Sugar; Rodolfo Ruiz
- Debut: October 19, 1979

José Casas Ruiz (born January 10, 1960), better known under the ring name Negro Casas, is a Mexican professional wrestler and professional wrestling trainer signed to Lucha Libre AAA Worldwide (AAA). He is a member of the Casas wrestling family, being the son of former wrestler turned referee Pepe Casas, brother of professional wrestlers El Felino and Heavy Metal, and uncle of Puma King, Felino Jr., Canelo Casas, Rocky Casas and Danny Casas.

Casas is best known for his work in Consejo Mundial de Lucha Libre (CMLL) from 1980 to 2023. Alongside Mr. Niebla, he was a founding member of the group La Peste Negra ("The Black Plague"), which also included El Felino, Heavy Metal and Bárbaro Cavernario. Casas has also wrestled for the Universal Wrestling Association (UWA), World Wrestling Association (WWA) and International Wrestling Revolution Group (IWRG) in Mexico, the World Wrestling Federation (WWF) in the United States, and New Japan Pro-Wrestling (NJPW) in Japan. He has trained several wrestlers, including Mephisto, Kazushige Nosawa, T. J. Perkins, Rocky Romero and Ricky Marvin.

== Early life ==
Casas was born in 1960, the son of professional wrestler Pepe "Tropi" Casas, and grew up around Tlalpan. Casas described his childhood as a happy and normal one, even though his father would be away from home for long stretches as he wrestled all over Mexico and the United States. At age five, Casas' father took him to his first wrestling show, located across the border in the United States. From that moment on, Casas became hooked on wrestling, with his first idols being his father, Aníbal and El Solitario. Casas played football, soccer, volleyball and baseball in school, while also training in professional wrestling classes taught by his father and Raúl Reyes. José and his brothers, Heavy Metal and El Felino, often sat at ringside during their father's matches, pretending to be upset or cry whenever their father looked like he was getting beat up in the ring, a ploy their father had taught them to help gain crowd sympathy.

== Professional wrestling career ==
=== Early career (1979–1991) ===
José Casas unexpectedly made his professional wrestling debut in 1979 when a promoter asked him to replace his father, Pepe Casas, who had not arrived to the arena, or else Pepe would be banned from wrestling. Clad in street clothes, he wrestled and won his first match under the ring name "Pepe Casas Jr.", only to discover Pepe and Raúl Reyes waiting in the dressing room; the two had played a joke on Casas to see how he handled himself in the ring. He then adopted the ring name "Negro Casas", never wearing a mask.

On January 1, 1984, Casas defeated Black Terry to win the Universal Wrestling Association (UWA)'s World Lightweight Championship, which he held for 301 days before losing it to El Hijo del Santo. This loss was part of an intense, long running storyline between the two that drew favorable reviews and helped establish both wrestlers as future main eventers; it included Casas being shaved bald after losing to El Hijo del Santo in a Lucha de Apuestas ("bet match"). In the late 1980s, Casas began working for the Mexican-based World Wrestling Association (WWA), where he became the inaugural WWA World Welterweight Champion, holding it from sometime in 1987 until he was defeated by Tornado Negro on April 14, 1989. Despite regaining the title, Casas lost it shortly after due to leaving the WWA. He returned to the UWA in 1990 and won the UWA World Middleweight Championship from Super Astro on January 29, 1991, before losing it after 787 days to Último Dragón.

=== Empresa Mexicana de Lucha Libre/Consejo Mundial de Lucha Libre (1981–2023) ===
==== Various storylines (1981–2008) ====
At the Empresa Mexicana de Lucha Libre (EMLL, later renamed CMLL) 48th Anniversary Show on September 18, 1981, Negro Casas worked a low card match at Coliseo Naucalpan against an equally young Fuerza Guerrera; the match was well-received by the audience, who threw money into the ring to show their appreciation. Promoter Paco Alonso even entered the ring and asked the crowd to appreciate their performance, earning both men a regular job with EMLL.

On December 1, 1995, Casas defeated longtime rival El Hijo del Santo in a tournament final to win the NWA World Welterweight Championship, holding it for over 200 days. They resumed their feud in 1997, culminating in another Lucha de Apuestas between the two, which Casas lost in the main event of the CMLL 63rd Anniversary Show on September 20. Afterwards, Casas and El Hijo del Santo began teaming with each other; in early 1999, they defeated Bestia Salvaje and Scorpio Jr. for the CMLL World Tag Team Championship by disqualification, but refused to accept it as they did not win by pinfall. A few weeks later, the duo earned a pinfall victory over them to claim the title. They reigned for over 400 days until being forced to vacate it when El Hijo del Santo left CMLL. Upon his return in 2001, he and Casas defeated Rey Bucanero and Último Guerrero to regain the title, but lost it in a rematch 210 days later. Casas has stated that El Hijo del Santo was one of his favorite rivals and good friends backstage.

Casas soon began focusing on his singles career, winning the CMLL World Middleweight Championship from Emilio Charles Jr. on April 26, 2004. In 2006, Casas began teaming with rising CMLL star Místico, defeating Averno and Mephisto for the CMLL Tag Team Championship, Casas' fourth and Místico's first, on April 14. On September 17, Casas' 874-day CMLL World Middleweight Championship reign ended at the hands of Averno. Casas and Místico lost their title to Dr. Wagner Jr. and Guerrero on July 13, 2007, but regained them a week later. They eventually lost the titles to Guerrero and Atlantis, failing to regain them in subsequent rematches.

==== La Peste Negra (2008–2023) ====
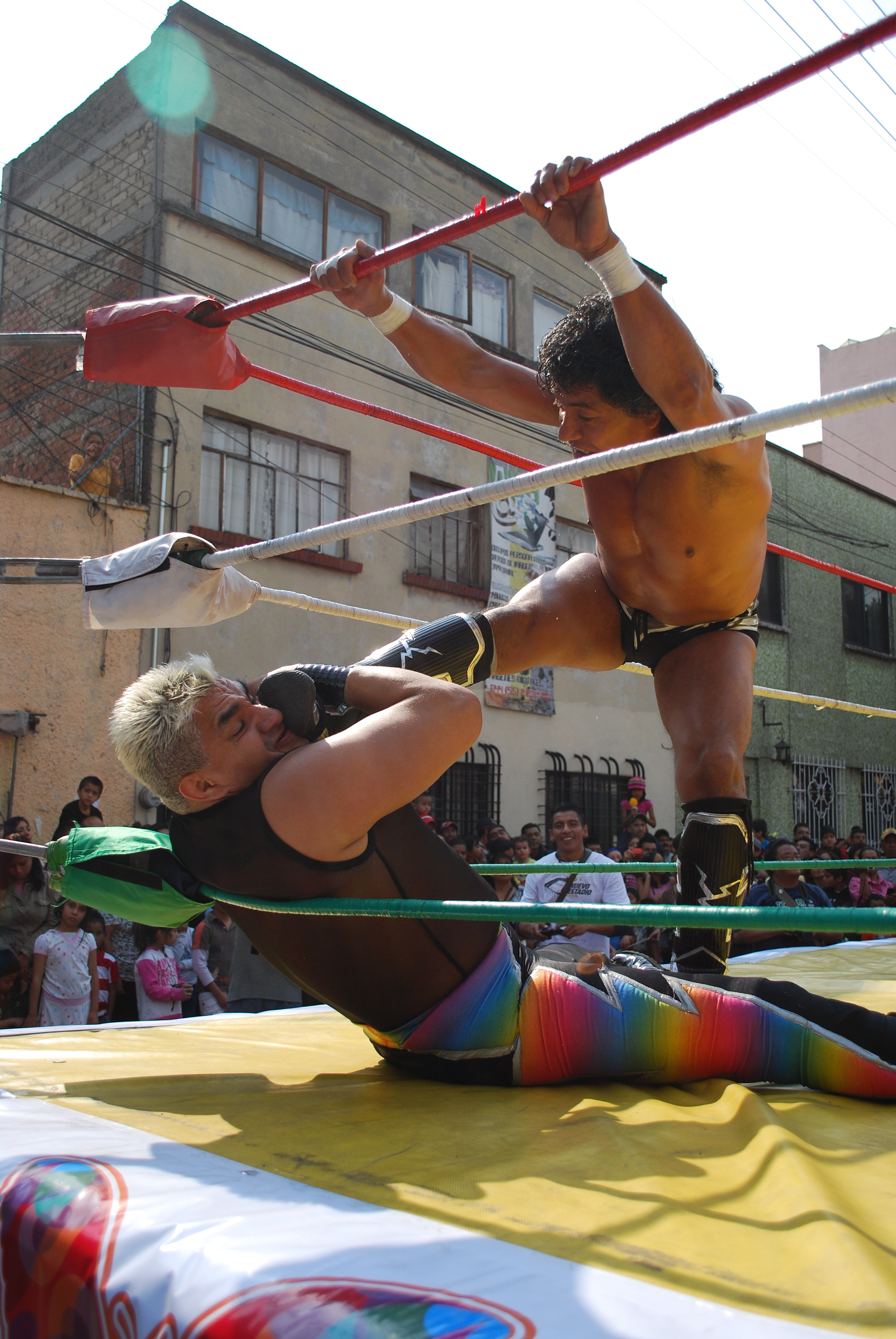
Casas during a match against Shocker in January 2013

In July 2008, the returning Mr. Niebla, alongside Casas and Heavy Metal, formed a rudo group with a more comical approach to wrestling, La Peste Negra ("The Black Plague"). They wore large afro wigs, painted their faces black and danced during their entrances, which was unusual for a serious wrestler like Casas. The following year, now-rudo El Felino joined La Peste Negra, while Heavy Metal, not comfortable with working the comedic style, was quietly phased out. La Pesta Negra's biggest triumph was Casas' title win over Místico that brought the CMLL World Welterweight Championship into the group. After the win, La Peste Negra continued their feud with Místico and his various allies, which culminated in a Lucha de Apuestas between Casas and Místico on September 18, 2009, at the CMLL 76th Anniversary Show, where Casas lost and had his hair shaved off.

On January 29, 2010, Negro Casas was paired with La Máscara in the Torneo Nacional de Pareja Increíbles ("National Incredible Pairs Tournament"), where a tecnico is paired with a rudo. They defeated El Texano Jr. and Rouge in the opening round, El Sagrado and Shocker in the second round, and Héctor Garza and Toscano in the semi-final to advance to the finals on February 5, which they lost to Atlantis and Máscara Dorada. On February 14, he defeated El Hijo del Fantasma for his second CMLL World Middleweight Championship. On October 15, Charly Manson defeated Casas in a Lucha de Apuestas to take his hair. On February 14, 2012, Casas defeated La Sombra to win the NWA World Historic Welterweight Championship for the first time. At Homenaje a Dos Leyendas ("Homage to Two Legends") on March 2, Casas and Blue Panther wrestled to a draw in a Lucha de Apuestas and were, as a result, both shaved bald. On December 25, Casas successfully defended the NWA Historic Welterweight Championship against Guerrero Maya Jr. at a special Christmas show after Maya Jr. had defeated Casas in a series of matches leading up to it. In early 2013, they were paired for the Torneo Nacional de Parejas Increibles, but lost in the first round to La Sombra and Volador Jr. On June 2, Casas lost the NWA World Historic Welterweight Championship to Dorada, ending his reign at 475 days, the longest in the title's history.

On January 3, 2014, Casas defeated Titán in the finals of the Leyenda de Plata ("The Silver Legend") tournament. On February 18, Casas, El Felino and Mr. Niebla defeated La Máscara, Rush and Titán to win the Mexican National Trios Championship. On June 13, Casas and Shocker defeated La Máscara and Rush to win the CMLL World Tag Team Championship. At El Juicio Final ("The Final Justice") on August 1, Casas lost his hair to Rush in a Lucha de Apuestas. On April 26, 2015, La Peste Negra lost the Mexican National Trios Championship to Los Reyes de la Atlantida (Atlantis, Delta and Guerrero Maya Jr.). On May 22, Casas defeated Dragon Lee to win the Leyenda de Plata, his second in a row and third overall. On February 14, 2018, CMLL vacated the CMLL World Tag Team Titles due to lack of defences since 2016.

Casas continued to compete at a high level in CMLL for several more years, including claiming Sam Adonis' hair at Sin Piedad (2018), losing his own in the main event of 2019's CMLL 86th Anniversary Show, and turning back tecnico after the 2020 dissolution of La Peste Negra. In January 2023, Casas and his wife Dalys la Caribeña unceremoniously departed CMLL, ending his 31 year long run in the company. Their stated motive was a desire to face new challenges and wrestle with their son-in-law Psycho Clown (which CMLL would have never permitted, given a 2017 incident that Psycho Clown was involved in). Rumors also circulated that CMLL were considering forcing Casas into retirement against his wishes, similar to the situation that same year between them & the original KeMonito.

=== New Japan Pro-Wrestling (1990–2022) ===
Casas made his debut for New Japan Pro-Wrestling (NJPW) on December 26, 1990, unsuccessfully challenging Jushin Thunder Liger for the IWGP Junior Heavyweight Championship. The following year, he participated in the 1991 Top of the Super Juniors tournament, scoring eight points to advance to the semi-finals, where he lost to Liger. On August 3, 1996, he participated in a tournament to unify 8 lightweight titles in NJPW's J-Crown tournament. Casas put the NWA World Welterweight Championship on the line, which he ultimately lost to Shinjiro Otani in the first round. At the Toukon Souzou New Chapter pay-per-view on October 8, 2005, he and El Felino unsuccessfully challenged Hirooki Goto and Minoru Tanaka for the IWGP Junior Heavyweight Tag Team Championship. From October to November 2008, Casas and Rocky Romero participated in the G1 Tag League as part of Block B. They finished with four points after two wins and three losses, failing to advance to the semi-finals. On May 3, 2010, Casas lost his CMLL World Middleweight Championship to Liger at Wrestling Dontaku 2010.

On October 21, 2012, Casas and Bushi, under the name "Grupo Cibernetico", lost to Suzuki-gun (Taichi and TAKA Michinoku) in the first round of the Super Junior Tag Tournament. At Power Struggle on November 11, he, Captain New Japan, Liger, Manabu Nakanishi and Tiger Mask lost to CHAOS (Jado, Takashi Iizuka, Tomohiro Ishii, Toru Yano and Yoshi-Hashi). Casas returned to NJPW in January 2020 to take part in Fantastica Mania 2020, their co-promoted tour with CMLL. There, he and Tiger participated in a family tag team tournament, defeating Ángel de Oro and Niebla Roja in the first round before losing to El Soberano Jr. and Euforia in the third place match. Casas made his Strong debut on the July 23, 2022 episode, which was also his final NJPW appearance, teaming with Adrian Quest and Lucas Riley in a loss to David Finlay, Máscara Dorada and Romero.

=== Lucha Libre AAA Worldwide (2023–present) ===
On January 21, 2023, Casas and his wife Dalys la Caribeña made their debuts for Lucha Libre AAA Worldwide (AAA) at a AAA television taping in Querétaro. On February 5, at Rey de Reyes, Casas made his AAA in-ring debut, being defeated by Hijo del Vikingo in a four-way Rey de Reyes match qualifier that also involved Myzteziz Jr. and Mecha Wolf. He would go on to win the AAA World Tag Team Championship with his son-in-law Psycho Clown in June 11, 2024.

Casas disappeared from the televised AAA product shortly after they were purchased by WWE in 2025, last appearing in the front row of the crowd for Worlds Collide in June. The prevailing presumption being that WWE considered it a liability to have a 65 year old man competing under their auspices.

Casas took 10 months off of wrestling in 2026, due to a left knee injury & the resulting stem cell treatment. It was the longest he had gone without wrestling in his 45-year career. He also entertained the possibility of retirement, the very thing that had purportedly caused his egress from CMLL 3 years prior.

== Personal life ==
José Casas is a member of an extensive wrestling family, founded by his father Pepe "Tropi" Casas and also consists of his brothers Erick, who wrestles as "Heavy Metal" and El Felino (Jorge Casas), and a brother who is not a professional wrestler. Casas' sister-in-law (Felino's wife) is former Mexican National Women's Champion Princessa Blanca. Casas' wife is the daughter of a Panamanian wrestling promoter that Casas once worked for, Dalys la Caribeña. His two daughters are training in Olympic style wrestling, also hoping to turn professional one day. José Casas does not train his daughters, entrusting that task to Ringo Mendoza, Tony Salazar, Arturo Beristain and Franco Colombo. One of Casas' daughters is married to professional wrestler Diamante. Casas also has two nephews who work as Tiger and Puma, the sons of El Felino. Wrestler Canelo Casas is also credited with being a nephew of Negro Casas, but it is unclear if he is the son of Erick Casas or the son of one of their non-wrestling brothers or sisters.

Casas is a fan of musician Juan Luis Guerra and his band "Los 4:40", which references the highest frequency in music. He adopted the nickname "4:40" in homage to them, under the suggestion of lucha journalist & commentator Alfonso Morales.

== Championships and accomplishments ==
- Cauliflower Alley Club
  - Lucha Libre Award (2024)
- Consejo Mundial de Lucha Libre
  - CMLL World Middleweight Championship (2 times)
  - CMLL World Tag Team Championship (6 times) – with El Hijo del Santo (3), Místico (2), and Shocker (1)
  - CMLL World Trios Championship (1 time) – with último Guerrero and Atlantis
  - CMLL World Welterweight Championship (1 time)
  - Mexican National Trios Championship (1 time) - with El Felino and Mr. Niebla
  - NWA World Historic Welterweight Championship (1 time)
  - NWA World Welterweight Championship (1 time) (Note: CMLL promotes three championships carrying the "NWA" label but they have not been endorsed by the National Wrestling Alliance since the late 1980s)
  - Torneo Gran Alternativa (1994) – with Héctor Garza
  - Leyenda de Plata (2000, 2014, 2015)
  - 71st Anniversary Trophy
  - Copa Bobby Bonales (2010)
  - 40th Anniversary recognition plaque
- International Wrestling Revolution Group
  - IWRG Intercontinental Middleweight Championship (1 time)
  - IWRG Intercontinental Trios Championship (1 time) – with El Felino and Heavy Metal
- Lucha Libre AAA Worldwide
  - AAA World Tag Team Championship (1 time) – with Psycho Clown
- Mexican Provincial Championships
  - Estado de Guerrero Lightweight Championship (1 time)
  - Estado de México Lightweight Championship (1 times)
- Pro Wrestling Illustrated
  - Ranked No. 33 of the 500 best singles wrestlers of the PWI 500 in 1999
  - Ranked No. 148 of the top 500 singles wrestlers of the PWI Years in 2003
- Universal Wrestling Association
  - UWA World Lightweight Championship (1 time)
  - UWA World Middleweight Championship (1 time)
- World Wrestling Association
  - WWA World Welterweight Championship (2 time, inaugural)
- Wrestling Observer Newsletter
  - Wrestling Observer Newsletter Hall of Fame (Class of 1996)

== Luchas de Apuestas record ==
Winner (wager)	Loser (wager)	Location	Event	Date	Notes
Eddy Guerrero (hair)	Negro Casas (hair)	Juarez, Chihuahua	Live event	1980s	
Negro Casas (hair)	Aristos (hair)	Mexico City	Live event	December 6, 1981	Relevos suicidas
Negro Casas (hair)	Diamante Blanco (hair)	Mexico City	Live event	February 28, 1983	
Negro Casas (hair)	Tony Ledesma (hair)	Tlalnepantla, Mexico State	Live event	December 4, 1983	
El Hijo del Santo (mask)	Negro Casas (hair)	Los Angeles, California	Live event	July 18, 1987	
Negro Casas (hair)	Black Man (hair)	Nezahualcoyotl, Mexico State	Live event	February 5, 1991	
Negro Casas (hair)	Valente Fernández (hair)	Puebla, Puebla	Live event	January 27, 1992	
Negro Casas (hair)	La Fiera (hair)	Mexico City	CMLL 60th Anniversary Show	October 1, 1993	
Negro Casas (hair)	Mocho Cota (hair)	Mexico City	Live event	September 23, 1994	
Negro Casas (hair)	Bestia Salvaje (hair)	Mexico City	Live event	October 18, 1996	
El Hijo del Santo (mask)	Negro Casas (hair)	Mexico City	CMLL 64th Anniversary Show	September 19, 1997	
Negro Casas (hair)	El Satánico (hair)	Puebla, Puebla	Live event	October 19, 1998	
Negro Casas (hair) and El Hijo del Santo (mask)	Bestia Salvaje (hair) and Scorpio, Jr. (mask)	Mexico City	Homenaje a Dos Leyendas	March 19, 1999	
Negro Casas (hair)	Bestia Salvaje (hair)	Guadalajara, Jalisco	Live event	June 26, 1999	
Negro Casas (hair)	Bestia Salvaje (hair)	Nuevo Laredo, Tamaulipas	Live event	November 6, 2000	
Negro Casas (hair)	Halcón de Oro (hair)	Reynosa, Tamaulipas	Live event	June 10, 2001	
Negro Casas (hair)	Mosco de la Merced (hair)	Tijuana, Baja California	Live event	May 9, 2002	(Note: Casas pinned Mosco de la Mercer in a six-man tag team match.)
Tarzan Boy (hair)	Negro Casas (hair)	Mexico City	CMLL 69th Anniversary Show	September 13, 2002	
El Satánico and Negro Casas (hair)	Tokyo Gurentai (hair) (Nosawa and Masada)	CMLL Live event	Mexico City	May 16, 2003	
Perro Aguayo Jr. (hair)	Negro Casas (hair)	Mexico City	CMLL Live event	June 18, 2004	(Note: This was a Steel cage match that also included Tarzan Boy, Vampiro, Pierroth, Jr. and Shocker)
Negro Casas (hair)	Okumura (hair)	Mexico City	CMLL Live event	December 5, 2004	(Note: This was a steel cage match that also included Rey Bucanero and Tarzan Boy)
Místico (mask)	Negro Casas (hair)	Mexico City	CMLL 76th Anniversary Show	September 18, 2009	
Charly Manson (hair)	Negro Casas (hair)	Mexico City	Entre el Cielo y el Infierno	October 15, 2010	
Draw	Negro Casas (hair); Blue Panther (hair)	Mexico City	Homenaje a Dos Leyendas	March 2, 2012	(Note: The match ended in a draw.)
Rush (hair)	Negro Casas (hair)	Mexico City	El Juicio Final	August 1, 2014	
Negro Casas (hair)	Super Parka (hair)	Mexico City	Sin Piedad	January 1, 2016	
Volador Jr. (hair)	Negro Casas (hair)	Mexico City	Homenaje a Dos Leyendas	March 18, 2016	
Negro Casas (hair)	Sam Adonis (hair)	Mexico City	Sin Piedad	January 1, 2018	
Último Guerrero (hair)	Negro Casas (hair)	Mexico City	CMLL 86th Anniversary Show	September 27, 2019	(Note: Last two men in a steel cage match that also included Bárbaro Cavernario, Big Daddy, Ciber the Main Man, Gilbert el Boricua, and Volador Jr.)
