= Titán (wrestler) =

Mexican professional wrestler (born 1990)

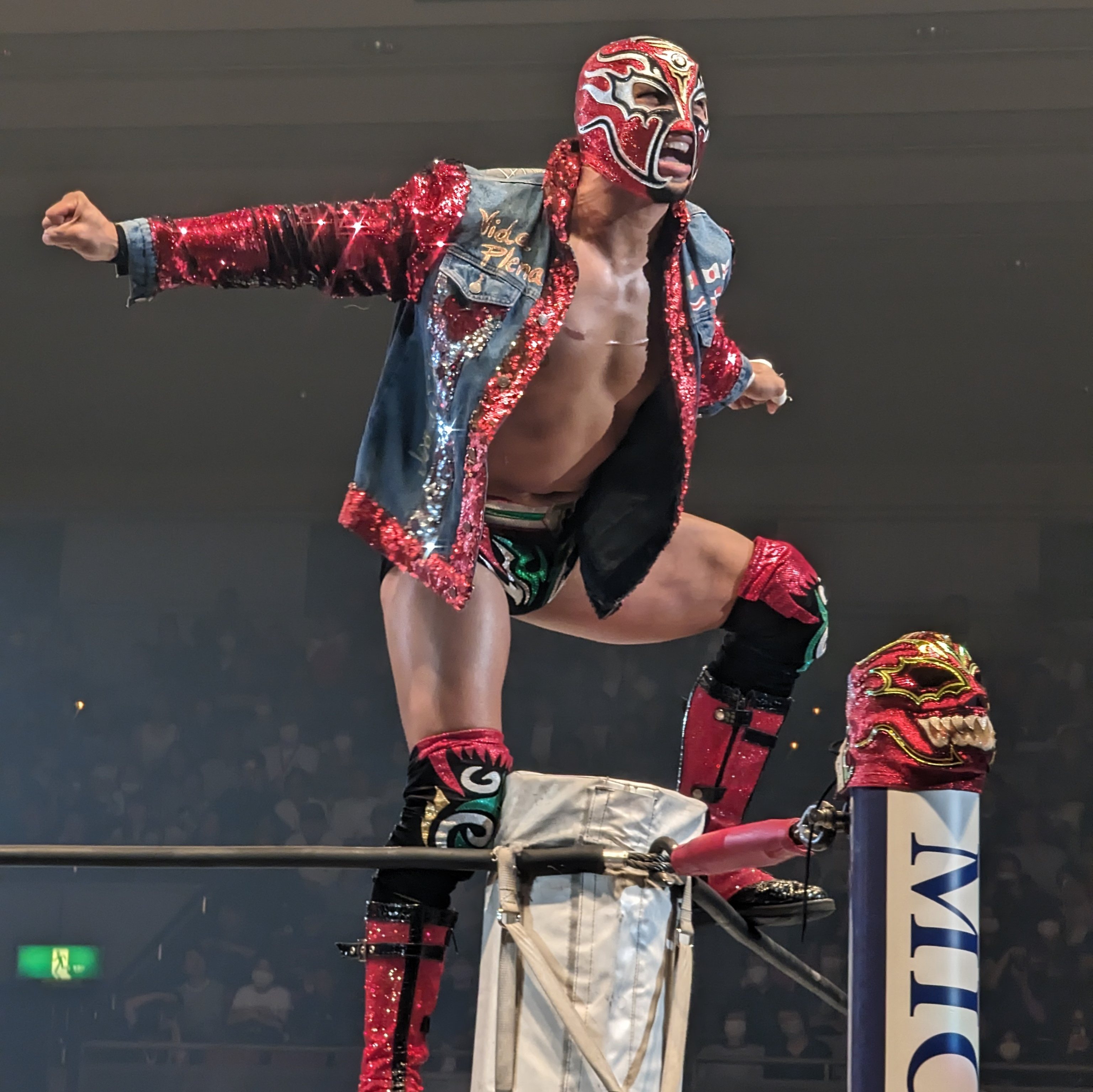
- Titán in November 2023

Personal information
- Born: October 15, 1990 (age 36) Guadalajara, Jalisco, Mexico

Professional wrestling career
- Ring names: Palacio Negro; Titán
- Billed height: 1.70 m (5 ft 7 in)
- Billed weight: 85 kg (187 lb)
- Trained by: Gran Cochisse; El Satánico
- Debut: 2008

Titán (born October 15, 1990) is a Mexican professional wrestler signed to Consejo Mundial de Lucha Libre (CMLL), where he is the current CMLL World Welterweight Champion in his first reign. He also makes appearances for New Japan Pro-Wrestling (NJPW), where he is a member of the Unbound Co. stable and is one-half of the Strong Openweight Tag Team Champions with Taiji Ishimori. Titan's real name is not a matter of public record, as is often the case with masked wrestlers in Mexico, where their private lives are concealed from the professional wrestling fans.

He began his in-ring career in 2008, working primarily in CMLL's local Guadalajara arena under the ring name Palacio Negro. In 2011, he began working more often in Mexico City, where he was given a new mask and the ring name "Titán". He is a former Mexican National Welterweight Champion, CMLL World Tag Team Champion (with Volador Jr.) and Mexican National Trios Champion (with La Máscara and Rush). He has won several CMLL tournaments, such as the 2009 Torneo Tanque Dantes (with Guerrero Samurai II), 2012 En Busca de un Ídolo, 2019 Torneo Nacional de Parejas Increíbles (with Bárbaro Cavernario) and the 2019 Reyes del Aire. Through CMLL's partnerships, Titán has also wrestled in Japan for NJPW, where he was a member of Los Ingobernables de Japón, and in the United States for Ring of Honor (ROH), All Elite Wrestling (AEW) and Major League Wrestling (MLW).

== Professional wrestling career ==
In Mexico, professional wrestlers traditionally maintain the secrecy of their true identities, not disclosing their real names or previous ring names. The listed debut dates can reflect when a wrestler began using a particular mask and name, rather than their initial entry into professional wrestling. In Titán's case, it is believed that he did not work under a different name before making his 2008 debut.

=== Consejo Mundial de Lucha Libre (2008–present) ===
==== Palacio Negro (2008–2011) ====
He debuted as "Palacio Negro" ("Dark Palace") in Guadalajara, Jalisco, the home of one of Consejo Mundial de Lucha Libre (CMLL)'s main wrestling schools. In 2009, he and Guerrero Samurai won the locally promoted Torneo Tanque Dantes ("Tank Dantes Tournament", held in honor of Alfonso "Tank" Dantés) with four wins and one loss. CMLL indicated plans of elevating Negro by booking him to win an eight-man Infierno en el Ring ("Inferno in the Ring") steel cage match on July 19, earning the rings to unmask Azrael, per the Lucha de Apuestas ("bet match") stipulation; the match also included future tag team partner Metal Blanco. He remained in Guadalajara for most of the year, continuing to train under Gran Cochisse and El Satánico. He failed to win the vacant Occidente Welterweight Championship in a torneo cibernetico on October 4, which was won by Ángel del Mal, whom he unsuccessfully challenged for it two months later.

By the end of 2010, Negro made his Mexico City debut at CMLL's primary venue, Arena México, teaming with Sagrado in a tournament to determine the number one contenders for the Mexican National Trios Championship. They advanced to the finals after defeating Los Guerreros Tuareg ("The Tuareg Warriors"; Arkangel de la Muerte, Loco Max and Skándalo) and Los Cancerberos del Infierno ("The Infernal Cerberusses"; Euforia, Nosferatu and Pólvora), but lost to Ángel de Oro, Diamante and Rush. On April 1, 2011, Negro was paired with veteran Averno in the Torneo Gran Alternativa ("Great Alternative Tournament"), defeating Black Warrior and Lestat in the first round and Negro Casas and Puma King in the quarter-finals, before losing to Blanco and Máscara Dorada in the semi-finals. Later that month, Negro and a slew of other young wrestlers entered CMLL's Forjando un Ídolo ("Forging an Idol") tournament. He only scored three points and failed to advance beyond the preliminary round, defeating Rey Cometa and losing to Ángel de Oro and Rey Escorpión. On May 24, he was the last man eliminated by Guerrero Maya Jr. in the semi-final torneo cibernetico of a tournament for the CMLL World Lightweight Championship. On August 14, Negro defeated Mr. Trueno to win the Occidente Middleweight Championship, his first professional wrestling championship. He was eliminated early in the Leyenda de Plata ("The Silver Legend") tournament on September 23 by Blanco. Seven days later, Negro was one of fourteen men putting their mask or hair on the line in an Infierno en el Ring steel cage match, where he pinned Loco Max, forcing him to be shaved bald afterward.

==== Titán (2011–present) ====
In November 2011, Negro and Blanco were repackaged with new masks and ring names, respectively becoming Titán and Tritón, new versions of characters CMLL used in the early 1990s. They briefly teamed with Shocker in his storyline rivalry against Los Reyes de la Atlantida ("The Kings of the Atlantis"; Atlantis, Delta and Guerrero Maya Jr.). At Homenaje a Dos Leyendas ("Homage to Two Legends") on March 2, 2012, Titán, Fuego and Tritón lost to Escorpión, Misterioso II and Namajague. Four days later, Titán competed in the Torneo Sangre Nueva ("New Blood Tournament"), similar in concept to Forjando un Ídolo, but was the last man eliminated by Dragon Lee. Later that month, he and Dorada lost in the first round of the Torneo Gran Alternativa to El Terrible and Euforia. In May, he entered the En Busca de un Ídolo ("In Search of an Idol") tournament, which used an online voting system. Despite winning just one of his four first round matches, fan support propelled Titán to the finals, where he defeated Euforia. Winning the tournament rewarded Titán with a CMLL World Middleweight Championship match against Dragón Rojo Jr. on July 20, which he lost. On September 4, Titán defeated Pólvora to capture the Mexican National Welterweight Championship. However, he suffered a herniated disc during a match in early 2013, forcing CMLL to vacate the title on March 20.

On June 30, Titán, La Máscara and Rush defeated Los Invasores ("The Invaders"; Kráneo, Mr. Águila and Psicosis) to win the Mexican National Trios Championship. At the CMLL 80th Anniversary Show on September 13, he, Brazo de Plata and Máximo lost to Euforia, Mephisto and Niebla Roja. On December 1, Titán regained the Mexican National Welterweight Championship from Averno. He outlasted Atlantis, Averno, Delta, El Felino, La Máscara, Okumura, Olímpico, Stuka Jr., Tiger, Tritón and Virus to qualify for the finals of the Leyenda de Plata, which he lost to Casas on January 3, 2014. On February 18, they lost the trios championship to La Peste Negra ("The Black Plague"; Casas, El Felino and Mr. Niebla). As part of a rivalry over the Mexican National Welterweight Championship, on February 20, 2015, Titán and Bárbaro Cavernario were paired for the Torneo Nacional de Parejas Increíbles ("National Incredible Pairs Tournament"), but lost to Rey Bucanero and Volador Jr. in the first round. At Homenaje a Dos Leyendas on March 20, Titán, Místico and Valiente defeated Casas, Cavernario and El Felino. On May 3, Titán lost the title to Cavernario. On March 18, 2016, Titán, Ángel de Oro and Cometa lost to Los Hijos del Averno ("The Sons of Hell"; Ephesto, Luciferno and Mephisto) at that year's Homenaje a Dos Leyendas. Later that year, he unsuccessfully challenged Mephisto for the CMLL World Welterweight Championship. At Homenaje a Dos Leyendas on March 17, 2017, Titán, Dragon Lee and Stuka Jr. defeated Los Guerreros Laguneros ("The Warriors of the Lagoon"; Euforia, Gran Guerrero and Roja).

Titán celebrating a fall with KeMonito, Stuka Jr. and Volador Jr. in June 2022

Titán was again paired with Cavernario for the Torneo Nacional de Parejas Increíbles on February 2, 2018, losing to Último Guerrero and Volador Jr. in the first round. During this time, he formed a trio with old partner Tritón and Esfinge known as La Excelencia Tapatia ("The Excellence of Guadalajara"). They unsuccessfully challenged Nueva Generación Dinamita ("New Generation Dynamite"; El Cuatrero, Forastero and Sansón) for the Mexican National Trios Championship on April 10. Throughout the rest of the year, Titán failed to win the Mexican National Welterweight Championship from Soberano Jr. on June 25, the CMLL World Welterweight Championship from Mephisto on August 28, and the CMLL World Middleweight Championship from El Cuatrero on November 6. Titán began 2019 by winning the Reyes del Aire on January 6, lastly eliminating Templario. At Homenaje a Dos Leyendas on March 15, he, Diamante Azul and Soberano Jr. defeated El Hijo del Villano III, Ephesto and Mephisto. When Titán was paired with Cavernario for that year's Torneo Nacional de Parejas Increíbles, they put aside their differences and wore a combined version of their usual ring gear, defeating Blue Panther and Máscara Año 2000 in the first round, Sansón and Soberano Jr. in the quarter-finals, Carístico and Mephisto in the semi-finals, and Guerrero and Volador Jr. to win the tournament. La Excelencia Tapatia again unsuccessfully challenged Nueva Generación Dinamita for the Mexican National Trios Championship on July 5.

Titán and Soberano Jr. outlasted Audaz, Casas, Cometa, Dulce Gardenia, Drone, Fuego, Fugaz, Star Jr., Stigma and Templario on December 3 to face each other for the vacant CMLL World Welterweight Championship the following week, with Titán becoming the 34th champion. On February 28, 2020, they participated in a tournament for the reintroduced Mexican National Tag Team Championship, defeating Sagrado and Misterioso Jr. in the first round and Ephesto and Luciferno in the quarter-finals, before losing to El Hijo del Villano III and Templario in the semi-finals. At the CMLL 87th Anniversary Show on September 25, Titán defeated Soberano Jr. to retain his title. On September 24, 2021, at the CMLL 88th Anniversary Show, Titán and Volador Jr. defeated Los Gemelos Diablo ("The Devil Twins") to win the CMLL World Tag Team Championship, but lost it to Ángel de Oro and Roja on January 23, 2022. At the CMLL 89th Anniversary Show on September 16, he, Casas and Star Jr. lost to Euforia, Hechicero and Mephisto. At the CMLL 90th Anniversary Show on September 16, 2023, Titán and Soberano Jr. lost to Lince Dorado and Samuray del Sol. On September 29, he successfully defended the CMLL World Welterweight Championship against Máscara Dorada at Noche de Campeones ("Night of Champions"). On September 6, 2024, Titán defeated Averno, Crixus, Dark Panther, El Hijo del Villano III, Gardenia, Star Jr. and Zandokan Jr. to qualify for the finals of the Copa Independencia ("Independence Cup") tournament, which he won by defeating Dorada at the CMLL 91st Anniversary Show seven days later. He also won the following year's tournament with Templario, defeating Galeón Fantasma ("Ghost Galleon"; Barboza and Difunto) in the finals at the CMLL 92nd Anniversary Show on September 19, 2025.

On January 16, 2026, Titán unsuccessfully challenged Ricochet for the AEW National Championship. On March 21, Titán announced that he suffered a right foot injury and would be sidelined for the foreseeable future, but returned to action the following month. At Lucha Kingdom on November 16, he and Taiji Ishimori defeated Ángel de Oro and Roja to win the Strong Openweight Tag Team Championship.

=== New Japan Pro-Wrestling (2013–present) ===
==== Sporadic appearances (2013–2022) ====
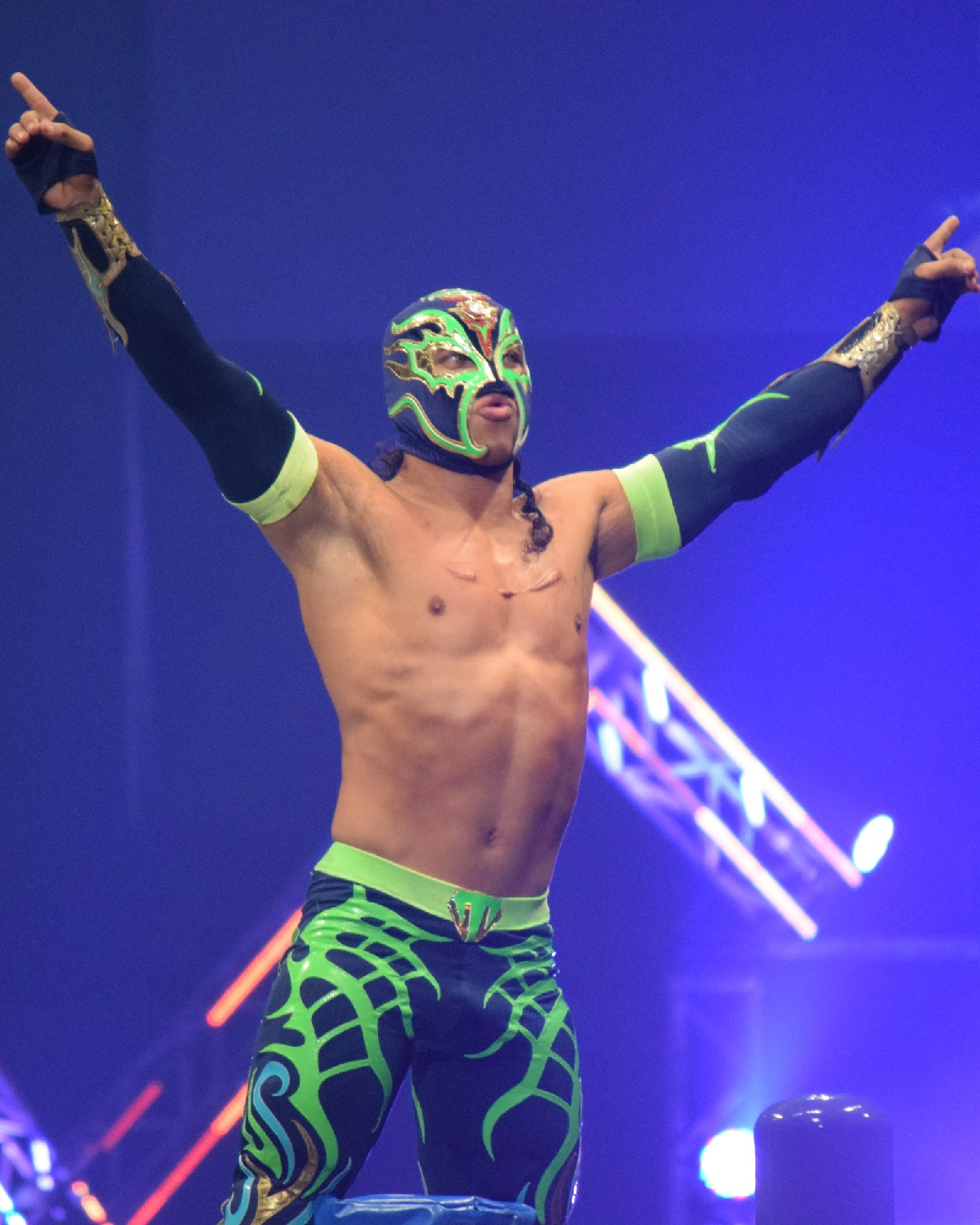
Titán in November 2016

As a result of winning the 2012 En Busca de un Ídolo, from January 18 to 20, 2013, Titán made his Japanese debut as part of the three-night Fantastica Mania 2013 tour, an annual series of shows co-promoted by CMLL and New Japan Pro-Wrestling (NJPW). Titán worked with, and against, NJPW wrestlers such as Tama Tonga, Jushin Thunder Liger, Tiger Mask, BUSHI and Ishii. He returned to NJPW later that year as the sole Mexican participant in NJPW's Best of the Super Juniors tournament, based on his performance during the Fantastica Mania tour. Titán earned six points in total by winning three of his eight matches in the tournament, failing to advance to the semi-finals.

From January 14 to 19, 2014, Titán took part in the Fantastica Mania 2014 tour, working mostly undercard matches. He unsuccessfully challenged Cavernario for the Mexican National Welterweight Championship on January 22, 2016, during the Fantastica Mania 2016 tour. On July 20, he returned to take part in the 2016 Super J-Cup, losing to Will Ospreay in the first round. On October 21, Titán and Ángel de Oro lost to Roppongi Vice (Beretta and Rocky Romero) in the first round of the 2016 Super Jr. Tag Tournament. The following year, he was invited back to NJPW for the Fantastica Mania 2017 tour in January, and both days of the G1 Special in USA tour on July 1 and 2, where he lost to, and then defeated, members of Los Ingobernables de Japón ("The Ungovernables of Japan"; L.I.J.) with various partners. Titán also participated in the 2017 Super Jr. Tag Tournament with Dragon Lee, losing in the first round to Los Ingobernables de Japón's BUSHI and Hiromu Takahashi on October 23. At Power Struggle on November 5, Titán and Lee lost to The Young Bucks (Matt Jackson and Nick Jackson).

Titán returned in January 2019 for the Fantastica Mania 2019 tour, which ended with he, Ángel de Oro and Atlantis unsuccessfully challenging Nueva Generación Dinamita for the Mexican National Trios Championship. He participated in that year's Best of the Super Juniors, finishing seventh in his block with six points. In October, alongside Volador Jr., he was invited back for the 2019 Super Junior Tag League, finishing the tournament in fourth place with a total of eight points. On November 3, Titán, Clark Connors, TJP and Volador Jr. defeated Liger, Ryusuke Taguchi, Tiger Mask and Yuya Uemura at Power Struggle. At the end of the Fantastica Mania 2020 tour in January 2020, he, Ángel de Oro and Niebla Roja failed to win the Mexican National Trios Championship from Nueva Generación Dinamita. Titán returned in May 2022 as a Block B participant for that year's Best of the Super Juniors. He finished with eight points after four wins and five losses, failing to advance to the finals.

==== Los Ingobernables de Japón (2022–2025) ====
At Declaration of Power on October 10, Titán returned to NJPW under a mask, aiding Los Ingobernables de Japón in a tag team match against United Empire. After the match, Titán revealed himself and requested to join the stable, who accepted Titán's request, making him the first full-time non-Japanese member. On November 5, Titán and stablemate BUSHI unsuccessfully challenged Catch 2/2 (Francesco Akira and TJP) for the IWGP Junior Heavyweight Tag Team Championship. Later that month, they entered the Super Jr. Tag League, but failed to advance to the finals with a total of twelve points. In February 2023, during the revived Fantastica Mania 2023 tour, Titán defeated Soberano Jr. to retain the CMLL World Welterweight Championship.

Titán, as part of the A Block, competed in the Best of the Super Juniors in May. He finished with twelve points and advanced to the semi-finals, where he defeated El Desperado. On May 28, Titán lost to Master Wato in the finals. At Dominion 6.4 in Osaka-jo Hall on June 4, Titán and stablemates BUSHI, Shingo Takagi and Tetsuya Naito defeated Just 5 Guys (Douki, Taichi, TAKA Michinoku and Yoshinobu Kanemaru). Five months later, Titán and BUSHI participated in the Super Jr. Tag League, but failed to advance to the finals with a record of five wins and four losses. At Power Struggle on November 4, he, BUSHI and Takagi lost to Intergalactic Jet Setters (Kevin Knight and Kushida) and Tama Tonga. Titán lost to Zack Sabre Jr. on August 30, 2024, at Capital Collision. In May 2025, Los Ingobernables de Japón disbanded after leader Naito and BUSHI departed NJPW. Titán and the remaining members would then form an unofficial spin-off stable, "Unaffiliated", and later aligned with Bullet Club.

==== Unbound Co. (2026–present) ====
On January 5, 2026, at New Year Dash!!, Yota Tsuji announced the dissolution of Bullet Club and Unaffiliated, replacing the alliance with Unbound Company, which was a complete merger.

=== Ring of Honor (2017–2018, 2024–2025) ===
In August 2017, Titán made his Ring of Honor (ROH) debut for the CMLL/NJPW/ROH/RevPro-promoted War of the Worlds UK tour, replacing an injured Atlantis as a CMLL representative. On the first night, he unsuccessfully challenged Kushida for the ROH World Television Championship, followed by losses on nights two and three. At Final Battle on December 15, Titán, Dragon Lee and Flip Gordon unsuccessfully challenged Bullet Club (Adam Page and The Young Bucks) for the ROH World Six-Man Tag Team Championship. He returned to ROH for one night at a television taping on June 2, 2018 (aired July 7), losing to Cody.

Titán returned to ROH on June 8, 2024, defeating Aaron Solo at a ROH Wrestling taping. He fought ROH World Television Champion Nick Wayne to a time limit draw in a Proving Ground match at Global Wars Mexico on June 26, 2025, leading to a title match at Supercard of Honor on July 11, where Titán was defeated.

=== All Elite Wrestling (2024) ===
Titán made his debut for All Elite Wrestling (AEW) on the March 9, 2024 episode of Collision (taped two days earlier), where he lost to Chris Jericho. He next appeared on the June 26 episode of Dynamite, teaming with Los Ingobernables de Japón stablemates Hiromu Takahashi and Shingo Takagi to defeat Blackpool Combat Club (Claudio Castagnoli, Jon Moxley and Wheeler Yuta) by disqualification. Four days later, at Forbidden Door Zero Hour, he, Takahashi and Yota Tsuji lost to Místico and The Lucha Brothers (Penta El Zero Miedo and Rey Fénix).

=== Major League Wrestling (2024–present) ===
On November 9, 2024, Titán made his debut for Major League Wrestling (MLW) at Lucha Apocalypto, where he unsuccessfully challenged Místico for the MLW World Middleweight Championship in a three-way match also involving Averno. At Fury Road on September 27, 2025, he lost to Volador Jr. in the first round of the Opera Cup tournament.

== The name Titán in lucha libre ==
Several luchadors have used the name Titán in lucha libre in addition to the current CMLL wrestler:

- Fishman – used the ring name in 1970 and 1971.
- Máscara Año 2000 – used the name in 1977 before adopting his more well known moniker.
- Jack Victory – the first man to work as Titán in CMLL.
- Comando Ruso – took over the name and mask in CMLL, from 1992 to 1994.

== Championships and accomplishments ==
- Consejo Mundial de Lucha Libre
  - CMLL World Welterweight Championship (1 time, current)
  - CMLL World Tag Team Championship (1 time) – with Volador Jr.
  - Mexican National Trios Championship (1 time) – La Máscara and Rush
  - Mexican National Welterweight Championship (2 times)
  - Occidente Middleweight Championship (1 time)
  - En Busca de un Ídolo (2012)
  - Reyes del Aire (2019)
  - Torneo Nacional de Parejas Increíbles (2019) – with Bárbaro Cavernario
  - Leyenda de Plata (2021)
  - Torneo Tanque Dantes (2009) – with Guerrero Samurai II
  - Copa Independencia (2024)
  - CMLL Universal Championship (2025)
  - Copa Independencia (2025) – with Templario
  - Copa Express (2014) - with Atlantis
- Desastre Total Ultraviolento
  - DTU Nexo Championship (1 time) – with Tritón
- New Japan Pro-Wrestling
  - Strong Openweight Tag Team Championship (1 time, current) – with Taiji Ishimori
- Pro Wrestling Illustrated
  - Ranked No. 75 of the top 500 singles wrestlers in the PWI 500 in 2023

== Luchas de Apuestas record ==
| Winner (wager) | Loser (wager) | Location | Event | Date | Notes |
|---|---|---|---|---|---|
| Palacio Negro (mask) | Azrael (mask) | Guadalajara, Jalisco | CMLL show | July 7, 2009 | (Note: This was an Infierno en el Ring steel cage match that also included Metal Blanco, Idolo, Virgo, Rey Trueno, Rafaga and Guerrero Samurai II.) |
| Palacio Negro (mask) | Loco Max (hair) | Guadalajara, Jalisco | CMLL show | September 30, 2011 | (Note: This was an Infierno en el Ring steel cage match that also included Metal Blanco, Toscano, Guerrero Maya, Jr., Ángel de Plata, Delta, Okumura, Leono, Yoshihashi, Leo, Maléfico, Sagrado and Pólvora.) |
