= Bárbaro Cavernario =

Mexican professional wrestler

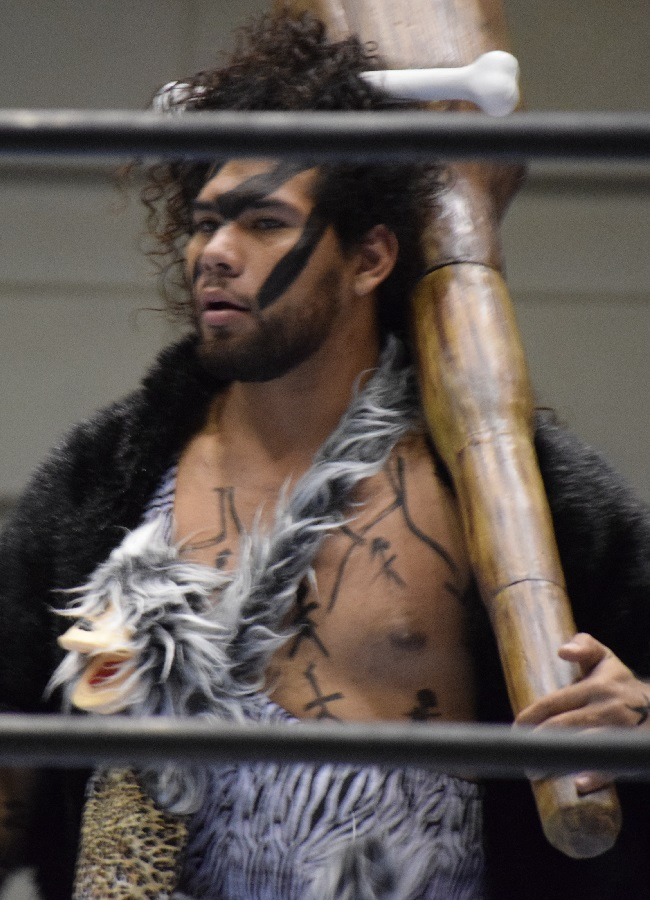
- Cavernario in January 2017

Personal information
- Born: November 6, 1993 (age 32) Zapopan, Jalisco, Mexico
- Spouse: Michelle Díaz (m. 2019)
- Children: 1

Professional wrestling career
- Ring name(s): Cavernario; Bárbaro Cavernario; Baby Cavernario; El Bárbaro
- Billed height: 1.73 m (5 ft 8 in)
- Billed weight: 89 kg (196 lb)
- Trained by: Aquiles; Apolo Dantés; Furia del Ring; Máscara Mágica
- Debut: April 25, 2008

Leonardo Moreno Ayala (born November 6, 1993), better known by his ring name Bárbaro Cavernario, is a Mexican professional wrestler, working for Mexican promotion Consejo Mundial de Lucha Libre (CMLL). He portrays a rudo ("bad guy") wrestling character.

In professional wrestling, Moreno is a two-time Occidente Middleweight Champion, a one-time Welterweight Champion, a one time Light Heavyweight Champion, and a seven-time tournament winner (En Busca de un Ídolo 2014, Gran Alternativa 2014, (Note: Cavernario's tag partner for this tournament was Mr. Niebla.) CMLL Reyes del Aire 2016, Torneo de Parejas Increíbles 2017, Leyenda de Plata 2018, Torneo de Parejas Increíbles 2019 and Leyenda Azul 2025). He was formerly a member of the wrestling group known as La Peste Negra ("The Black Plague").

== Personal life ==
Leonardo Moreno Ayala is the brother of professional wrestlers known under the ring names Demonio Maya (Mayan Demon) and Principe Daniel. Since both brothers wrestle under a mask, or as enmascarados, their full names are not a matter of public knowledge per lucha libre traditions. Moreno is studied Accounting at the University of Guadalajara to ensure he had a skill to fall back on in case he is injured and unable to wrestle. He graduated in 2018.

In 2019, Moreno married Michelle Diaz. The couple have a son together, born in 2021.

== Professional wrestling career ==
Leonardo Moreno Ayala trained for his professional wrestling career under wrestlers Furia del Ring and Aquiles alongside his brother Demonio Maya and made his professional wrestling debut in 2008. It has not been confirmed what ring name Moreno competed under at the beginning of his career; with the secrecy of masked wrestlers in Mexico, it is possible he used other ring names before he began working as the masked El Bárbaro.

=== Consejo Mundial de Lucha Libre (2012–present) ===
He made his debut for Consejo Mundial de Lucha Libre (CMLL), Mexico's biggest professional wrestling promotion, in 2012 using the masked El Bárbaro ("The Barbarian"), a generic wrestling character. In early 2012, only months into his CMLL sting El Bárbaro lost his mask when he lost a Lucha de Apuestas, or "bet match" to El Gallo and was forced to unmask. For many luchadors losing their mask tends to slow their careers down, but in Moreno's case he reworked his image and became known as Bárbaro Cavernario, a caveman character inspired by Mexican Lucha Libre legend Cavernario Galindo, adopting the furry loin cloth and boots look of Galindo, as well as using La Cavernaria as a finishing move just like the original. Growing his hair out, Moreno added a more dramatic execution to his matches, acting like a savage in the ring in between moves. The repackaged Moreno was pushed by CMLL, giving him several Lucha de Apuestas victories, which in Mexico, is an accolade held in higher regard than winning title victories. As Cavernario, he started a storyline with Guadalajara local wrestlers Javier Cruz Jr. and Leo. On June 24, Cavernario defeated Cruz Jr. in a match which saw Cruz Jr. shaved bald after the match. Only days later, he defeated Leo in a match that left Leo bald after his loss. As part of the storyline, Cruz Jr.'s well known father Javier Cruz out of retirement for the storyline. On July 15, 2012, Cavernario defeated Cruz Sr. in his third Lucha de Apuesta victory within four weeks. Weeks later, Cavernario was one of sixteen wrestlers included in a tournament for the local Occidente Middleweight Championship that was vacant at the time. Cavernario defeated Stuka Jr., Fuego, Halcon de Plata, Leo, Virus, Raziel and Sadio to qualify for the finals of the tournament. In the finals, Cavernario lost to Smaker, who became the champion. On December 16, 2012, Cavernario won the Occidente Middleweight Championship when he defeated Smaker in a rematch. He would hold the title for just over seven months, before Black Metal won the championship. Two weeks later, Cavernario regained the championship from Black Metal. On October 27, 2013, Fuego defeated Cavernario to win the title from him.

Following the loss of the championship, Cavernario began to work more matches in Mexico City, CMLL's main venue. In early 2014, Cavernario was teamed up with veteran wrestler Mr. Niebla, for CMLL's annual Gran Alternativa ("Great Alternative") tournament. The concept of the tournament saw sixteen teams, composed of a low ranked rookie teamed up with an established veteran wrestler to showcase new talent. In the first round the team defeated the father/son team of Blue Panther and Black Panther, then defeated Último Guerrero and Hechicero in the second round, and finally brothers Rush and Dragon Lee, to qualify for the finals. The finals took place on February 21, 2014, as part of CMLL's annual Homenaje a Dos Leyendas special event, which saw Cavernario and Mr. Niebla defeat Volador Jr. and Soberano Jr. to win the tournament. Following the tournament, Mr. Niebla invited Cavernaro to join a group known as La Peste Negra ("The Black Plague"), a group of wrestlers that all employed a wild, comical wrestling style that complemented Cavernario's own style. Over the summer of 2014, Cavernario was one of eight wrestlers competing in CMLL's En Busca de un Ídolo ("In search of an idol") tournament. Cavernario competed against other young wrestlers such as Hechicero, Cachorro, Dragon Lee, Guerrero Negro Jr., Super Halcón Jr., Soberano Jr. and Star Jr. The tournament consisted of a round-robin portion, where the wrestlers were given points of a scale of 0 to 10, during one match Cavernario, despite losing the actual match, was given a perfect 40 points by the four judges due to his performance in the match. The finals saw Cavernario defeat Hechnicero to win the tournament, and earn a spot on the Fantastica Mania tour next January. Two days later, Cavernario was one of eight wrestlers that put their hair or mask on the line in a steel cage match as part of a special show celebrating the 55th anniversary of the Arena Coliseo Guadalajara. After El Gallo, Rey Cometa, Boby Zavala, Sádico, Esfinge and Demonio Maya all escaped the cage, Cavernario defeated Black Metal to earn his first mask victory in his career. On September 19, 2014, in one of the feature matches of the CMLL 81st Anniversary Show, Cavernario defeated Rey Cometa in a Lucha de Apuestas match, forcing his opponent to be shaved bald after the match. On May 3, 2015, Cavernario defeated Titán to win the Mexican National Welterweight Championship. He lost the title to Rey Cometa on June 10, 2016. On July 1, Cavernario defeated Cometa in another Lucha de Apuestas between the two. On November 6, 2018, Cavernario won the Mexican National Light Heavyweight Championship for the first time winning it from Atlantis. On November 23, 2018, Cavernario won the Leyenda de Plata tournament.

Cavernario in June 2022

On January 24, 2020, at La Noche de Mr. Niebla, Cavernario and Felino faced each other on opposite sides in a Relevos increíbles six-man tag team match between members of La Peste Negra. They would repeatedly attack each other throughout the match, which ended in a disqualification when Cavernario cheated to win the final fall over Felino. Afterwards, Cavernario announced that La Peste Negra had disbanded, but Felino hoped that the stable would continue. In the weeks that followed, Cavernario and Felino were involved in multiple confrontations (including at the Torneo Nacional de Parejas Increíbles final where Felino distracted Cavernario enough that he was pinned for the third and final fall), until they agreed on a hair vs. hair match at Homenaje a Dos Leyendas. The event had to be cancelled in the wake of the COVID-19 pandemic, and it would be rescheduled the following year. They continued the feud later that year during CMLL's empty arena shows. In 2021, they were paired together for the Torneo Nacional de Parejas Increíbles, but were defeated in the first round by Ángel de Oro and Mephisto. Cavernario was later challenged by Felino for the Mexican National Light Heavyweight Championship, which happened on June 29. Cavernario was defeated by Felino who hit him with a low blow, as the referee was dealing with Negro Casas; this ended his reign at 966 days. At Homenaje a Dos Leyendas, Cavernario defeated Felino in the hair vs. hair match.

He is one of 4 people to have won both Leyenda Azul and Leyenda de Plata tournaments.

=== New Japan Pro-Wrestling (2015, 2016, 2017) ===
In January 2015, Cavernario made his New Japan Pro-Wrestling (NJPW) debut, when he worked the Fantastica Mania 2015 tour, co-produced by CMLL and NJPW. Cavernario returned to NJPW to take part in the 2015 Best of the Super Juniors. He finished with a record of three wins and four losses, failing to advance to the finals of the tournament. In January 2016, Cavernario returned to take part in the Fantastica Mania 2016 tour. On the fourth show, he successfully defended the Mexican National Welterweight Championship against Titán. In January 2017, Cavernario took part in the Fantastica Mania 2017 tour, unsuccessfully challenging Dragon Lee for the CMLL World Lightweight Championship during the January 20 event.

== Championships and accomplishments ==
- Consejo Mundial de Lucha Libre
  - CMLL World Light Heavyweight Championship (1 time)
  - CMLL World Trios Championship (1 time ) – with Dragón Rojo, Jr. and El Terrible
  - Mexican National Light Heavyweight Championship (1 time)
  - Mexican National Welterweight Championship (1 time)
  - Occidente Middleweight Championship (2 times)
  - Occidente Trios Championship (1 time) - with Demonio Maya and Príncipe Daniel
  - En Busca de un Ídolo (2014)
  - Leyenda de Azul (2025)
  - Leyenda de Plata (2018)
  - Torneo Gran Alternativa (2014) – with Mr. Niebla
  - Torneo Nacional de Parejas Increíbles (2017, 2019) – with Volador Jr., Titán
  - Reyes del Aire (2016)
  - Copa 70 Aniversario de la Arena Mexico (with Mistico, Ultimo Guerrero & Angel de Oro)
- Promociones Furia Blanca
  - Pacific Coast Tag Team Championship (w/ Espectrum)
- Pro Wrestling Illustrated
  - Ranked No. 146 of the top 500 singles wrestlers in the PWI 500 in 2019

== Luchas de Apuestas record ==
Winner (wager)	Loser (wager)	Location	Event	Date	Notes
El Gallo (mask)	El Bárbaro (mask)	Guadalajara, Jalisco	Live event	March 11, 2012	
Bárbaro Cavernario (hair)	Javier Cruz Jr. (hair)	Guadalajara, Jalisco	Live event	June 24, 2012	(Note: This match also included Leo.)
Bárbaro Cavernario (hair)	Leo (hair)	Guadalajara, Jalisco	Live event	July 1, 2012	
Bárbaro Cavernario (hair)	Javier Cruz (hair)	Guadalajara, Jalisco	Live event	July 15, 2012	
Bárbaro Cavernario (hair)	Black Metal (mask)	Guadalajara, Jalisco	Live event	June 22, 2014	(Note: Last two wrestlers in a steel cage match that also included El Gallo, Rey Cometa, Boby Zavala, Sádico, Esfinge and Demonio Maya.)
Bárbaro Cavernario (hair)	Rey Cometa (hair)	Mexico City	CMLL 81st Anniversary Show	September 19, 2014	
Bárbaro Cavernario (hair)	Rey Cometa (hair)	Mexico City	International Gran Prix	July 1, 2016	
Bárbaro Cavernario and Rush (hair)	Matt Taven and Volador Jr. (hair)	Mexico City	CMLL 85th Anniversary Show	September 14, 2018	
Bárbaro Cavernario (hair)	Felino (hair)	Mexico City	Homenaje a Dos Leyendas	September 17, 2021	
