= CMLL Leyendas Mexicanas (2019) =

2019 Mexican professional wrestling show

Leyendas Mexicanas (2019)
- Official poster for the event, depicting several of the participants
- Promotion: Consejo Mundial de Lucha Libre
- Date: December 6, 2019
- City: Mexico City, Mexico
- Venue: Arena México

Pay-per-view chronology
| ← Previous; Día de Muertos | Next → La Copa Junior |

Leyendas Mexicanas chronology
| ← Previous; 2018 | Next → — |

Leyendas Mexicanas (2019) was a professional wrestling super card show that was held on December 6, 2019. The show was produced and scripted by the Mexican professional wrestling promotion Consejo Mundial de Lucha Libre (CMLL; Spanish for "World Wrestling Council") and took place at Arena México in Mexico City, Mexico.

The show included six matches in total, with the first, third, fourth and sixth match featuring luchadors who were invited to the show for the celebration of lucha libre legends. In the main event Rayo de Jalisco Jr., Tinieblas Jr., and Villano IV defeated El Canek, Fuerza Guerrera, and Máscara Año 2000. On the undercard El Satánico defeated El Solar and the opening match saw Los Diabolicos (El Gallego, Rocky Santana, and Romano Garcia) for the third year in a row, this time losing Super Muñeco, Ricky Boy, and Skayde. In the semi-main event Bandido, Volador Jr., and Valiente defeated Nueva Generacion Dinamitas (El Cuatrero, Sansón, and Forastero), who are all nephews of Máscara Año 2000.

== Production ==
=== Background ===
The Mexican wrestling company Consejo Mundial de Lucha Libre (Spanish for "World Wrestling Council"; CMLL) first held a show under the name Leyendas Mexicanas ("Mexican Legends") in November 2017, with the 2019 show marking the third time the name has been used. The Leyendas Mexicanas shows feature various lucha libre "legends" and celebrates the history of CMLL.

As part of their celebration some wrestlers, who had previously been unmasked by losing a Lucha de Apuestas match, were given permission by the Mexico City professional wrestling commission to wear their mask again for one night. The wrestling mask has always held a sacred place in lucha libre, carrying with it a mystique and anonymity beyond what it means to wrestlers elsewhere in the world. The ultimate humiliation a luchador can suffer is to lose a Lucha de Apuestas, or bet match. Following a loss in a Lucha de Apuesta match the masked wrestler would be forced to unmask, state their real name and then would be unable to wear that mask while wrestling anywhere in Mexico. While the name was not used until 2018 CMLL has often held shows featuring and honoring "legends" of Lucha Libre, especial for anniversary shows such as Arena Coliseo 70th Anniversary Show, Blue Panther 40th Anniversary Show, Atlantis 35th Anniversary Show, Negro Casas 40th Anniversary Show that all featured "legends" booked by CMLL for special appearances.

=== Storylines ===
The event will feature a number of professional wrestling matches with different wrestlers involved in pre-existing scripted feuds, plots and storylines. Wrestlers portray as either heels (referred to as rudos in Mexico, those that portray the "bad guys") or faces (técnicos in Mexico, the "good guy" characters) as they followed a series of tension-building events, which culminate in a wrestling match or series of matches.

On November 14, 2019 Romano Garcia, also known under the ring name "Mr. Cóndor" announced that he, and his fellow Los Diabolicos (El Gallego and Rocky Santana), would compete for CMLL on December 6, 2019 as part of their major show. Los Diabolicos previous worked on both the 2017 and 2018 Leyenda Mexicanas shows, each time facing Trio Fantasia (Super Muñeco, Super Pinocho, and Super Raton). The following day Jorge Rivera Soriano, known in wrestling as Skayde revealed that he would also appear on the December 6 show. Skayde briefly worked for CMLL in the first part of 1999, 20 years prior to the Leyendas show. CMLL later confirmed that the December 6 Super Viernes show would indeed be the Leyendas Mexicanas show. In the lead up to the show, Mano Negra announced that the Leyendas Mexicanas show would be his final match at Arena México.

== Matches ==
| No. | Results | Stipulations |
|---|---|---|
| 1 | Super Muñeco, Ricky Boy, and Skayde defeated Los Diabolicos (El Gallego, Rocky Santana, and Romano Garcia) | Six-man "Lucha Libre rules" tag team match |
| 2 | Atlantis Jr., Star Jr., and Audaz defeated Tiger, Misterioso Jr. and El Sagrado | Six-man "Lucha Libre rules" tag team match |
| 3 | Negro Casas, Blue Panther, and Virus defeated Mano Negra, Super Astro, and Negro Navarro | Six-man "Lucha Libre rules" tag team match |
| 4 | El Satánico defeated El Solar | Singles match |
| 5 | Bandido, Volador Jr., and Valiente defeated Nueva Generacion Dinamitas (El Cuatrero, Sansón, and Forastero) | Six-man "Lucha Libre rules" tag team match |
| 6 | Rayo de Jalisco Jr., Tinieblas Jr., and Villano IV defeated El Canek, Fuerza Guerrera, and Máscara Año 2000 | Six-man "Lucha Libre rules" tag team match |
