= CMLL Leyendas Mexicanas (2018) =

2018 Consejo Mundial de Lucha Libre event

Leyendas Mexicanas (2018)
- Promotion: Consejo Mundial de Lucha Libre
- Date: November 30, 2018
- City: Mexico City, Mexico
- Venue: Arena México

Pay-per-view chronology
← Previous; Leyenda de Plata	Next → Sin Piedad

Leyendas Mexicanas chronology
← Previous; 2017	Next → 2019

Leyendas Mexicanas (2018) was a professional wrestling super card event produced by the Mexican Lucha Libre promotion Consejo Mundial de Lucha Libre (CMLL; Spanish for "World Wrestling Council"). The Leyendas Mexicana show took place on November 30, 2018 in Arena México, Mexico City, Mexico and celebrated the history of lucha libre in Mexico. The event saw the return of several wrestlers who had not worked for CMLL in a long time, in a couple of cases they had not worked in a CMLL ring since the 1990s.

The main event of the Leyendas Mexicanas show was a traditional six-man "Lucha Libre rules" tag team match that saw Atlantis, Blue Panther and Rayo de Jalisco Jr. defeat El Canek, Máscara Año 2000 and Villano IV. In the semi-main event Los Guerreros Laguneros (Euforia, Gran Guerrero, and Ultimo Guerrero) defended the CMLL World Trios Championship against El Sky Team (Místico and Volador Jr.) and Carístico. The six-man show also featured the one-night return of Trio Fantasia (Super Muñeco, Super Pinocho, and Super Raton), Los Diabolicos (El Gallego, Rocky Santana, and Romano Garcia), Mano Negra, El Solar, Fuerza Guerrera, Jerry Estrada, and Negro Navarro.

== Production ==
=== Background ===
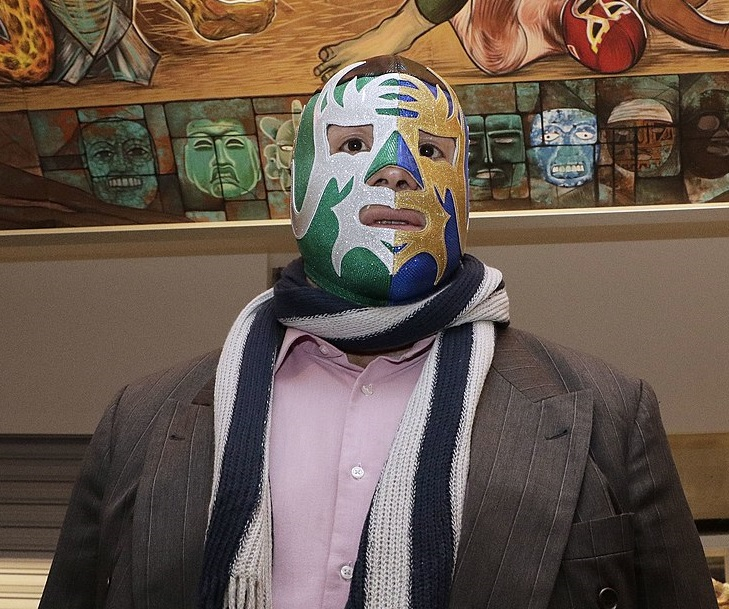
Máscara Año 2000 before the show, wearing the mask he lost in 1993.

The Mexican wrestling company Consejo Mundial de Lucha Libre (Spanish for "World Wrestling Council"; CMLL) first show under the name Leyendas Mexicanas ("Mexican Legends") in November 2017. The 2018 event became the second year in the row CMLL promoted a show under that name. The Leyendas Mexicanas show featured various lucha libre "legends" and celebrates the history of CMLL. As part of their celebration some wrestlers, who had previously been unmasked by losing a Lucha de Apuestas match, were given permission by the Mexico City professional wrestling commission to wear their mask again for one night. The wrestling mask has always held a sacred place in lucha libre, carrying with it a mystique and anonymity beyond what it means to wrestlers elsewhere in the world. The ultimate humiliation a luchador can suffer is to lose a Lucha de Apuestas, or bet match. Following a loss in a Lucha de Apuesta match the masked wrestler would be forced to unmask, state their real name and then would be unable to wear that mask while wrestling anywhere in Mexico.

For the 2018 Leyendas Mexicanas both Máscara Año 2000 and Mano Negra wore their masks for the show. Máscara Año 2000 lost a Lucha de Apuestas to Perro Aguayo on April 30, 1993 in the main event of Triplemanía I. Mano Negra lost his mask to Atlantis in the main event of the CMLL 60th Anniversary Show on October 1, 1993.

While the name was not used until 2017, CMLL has often held shows featuring and honoring "legends" of Lucha Libre, especial for anniversary shows such as Arena Coliseo 70th Anniversary Show, Blue Panther 40th Anniversary Show, Atlantis 35th Anniversary Show, Negro Casas 40th Anniversary Show that all featured "legends" booked by CMLL for special appearances.

=== Storylines ===
The event featured six professional wrestling matches with different wrestlers involved in pre-existing scripted feuds, plots and storylines. Wrestlers were portrayed as either heels (referred to as rudos in Mexico, those that portray the "bad guys") or faces (técnicos in Mexico, the "good guy" characters) as they followed a series of tension-building events, which culminated in a wrestling match or series of matches.

== Results ==
No.	Results	Stipulations	Times
1	Trio Fantasia (Super Muñeco, Super Pinocho, and Super Raton) defeated Los Diabolicos (El Gallego, Rocky Santana, and Romano Garcia)	Six-man "Lucha Libre rules" tag team match	14:41
2	Gallito, Guapito, and Microman defeated Chamuel, Mije, and Zacarias el Perico	Six-man "Micro-Estrellas" tag team match	14:39
3	La Sangre Dinamita (El Cuatrero, Forastero, and Sansón) defeated Los Ingobernables (El Terrible and Rush) and Bárbaro Cavernario	Six-man "Lucha Libre rules" tag team match	14:15
4	El Felino, Mano Negra, and El Solar defeated Fuerza Guerrera, Jerry Estrada, and Negro Navarro	Six-man "Lucha Libre rules" tag team match	17:35
5	Los Guerreros Laguneros (Euforia, Gran Guerrero, and Ultimo Guerrero) (c) defeated El Sky Team (Místico and Volador Jr.) and Carístico	Six-man "Lucha Libre rules" tag team match for the CMLL World Trios Championship	11:33
6	Atlantis, Blue Panther and Rayo de Jalisco Jr. defeated El Canek, Máscara Año 2000 and Villano IV	Six-man "Lucha Libre rules" tag team match	09:57
(c) / – the champion(s) heading into the match
