= CMLL Leyendas Mexicanas (2016) =

2016 Mexican professional wrestling show

- Promotion: Consejo Mundial de Lucha Libre
- Date: September 16, 2016
- City: Mexico City, Mexico
- Venue: Arena México

Pay-per-view chronology
← Previous; CMLL 83rd Anniversary Show	Next → Reyes del Aire

Leyendas Mexicanas chronology
← Previous; First	Next → 2017

Leyendas Mexicanas (2018) ("Mexican Legends") was a professional wrestling super card show that was held on September 16, 2016 in Arena México in Mexico City, Mexico. . The show will be produced and scripted by the Mexican professional wrestling promotion Consejo Mundial de Lucha Libre (CMLL; Spanish for "World Wrestling Council"). The show celebrated the history of lucha libre in Mexico and saw the return of several wrestlers who did not work for CMLL on a regular basis. Three out of the six matches on the show featured non-CMLL wrestlers invited for the lucha libre celebration.

== Production ==
=== Background ===
The Mexican wrestling company Consejo Mundial de Lucha Libre (Spanish for "World Wrestling Council"; CMLL) first held a show under the name Leyendas Mexicanas ("Mexican Legends") in September 2016, The Leyendas Mexicanas shows feature various lucha libre "legends" and celebrates the history of CMLL. While the name was not specifically used until 2016 CMLL has often held shows featuring and honoring "legends" of Lucha Libre, especial for anniversary shows such as Arena Coliseo 70th Anniversary Show, Blue Panther 40th Anniversary Show, Atlantis 35th Anniversary Show, Negro Casas 40th Anniversary Show that all featured "legends" booked by CMLL for special appearances.

=== Storylines ===
The event featured six professional wrestling matches with different wrestlers involved in pre-existing scripted feuds, plots and storylines. Wrestlers portray as either heels (referred to as rudos in Mexico, those that portray the "bad guys") or faces (técnicos in Mexico, the "good guy" characters) as they followed a series of tension-building events, which culminate in a wrestling match or series of matches.

== Results ==
No.	Results	Stipulations
1	Estrellita, Marcela, and Sanely defeated La Amapola, La Jarochita, and La Metálica	Six-woman "Lucha Libre rules" tag team match
2	Blue Panther, Kahoz, and Negro Navarro defeated Mano Negra, El Solar, and Súper Astro	Six-man "Lucha Libre rules" tag team match
3	Fuerza Guerrera, Negro Casas, and El Satánico defeated Atlantis, El Fantasma, and Máscara Sagrada	Six-man "Lucha Libre rules" tag team match
4	Valiente defeated Bárbaro Cavernario	VIP Lightning match - 1 fall, 10 minute time limit
5	Los Guerreros Laguneros (Euforia and Último Guerrero) and Matt Taven defeated Los Ingobernables (Pierroth, Rey Escorpión, and Rush)	Six-man "Lucha Libre rules" tag team match
6	El Canek, Dos Caras, and Rayo de Jalisco Jr. defeated Los Hermanos Dinamita (Cien Caras, Máscara Año 2000, and Universo 2000)	Six-man "Lucha Libre rules" tag team match
