= CMLL Leyendas Mexicanas =

Mexican professional wrestling show series

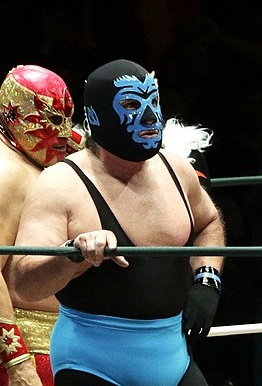
- Legends Mano Negra (front) and El Solar during the 2018 show.
- Promotions: Consejo Mundial de Lucha Libre
- First event: 2017
- Last event: 2019
- Event gimmick: veteran wrestlers return to CMLL for matches

CMLL Leyendas Mexicanas (Spanish for "Mexican Legends") is the collective name of a series of annually occurring lucha libre, or professional wrestling supercard how promoted by Mexican professional wrestling promotion Consejo Mundial de Lucha Libre (CMLL). Starting in 2017 CMLL has held specially themed shows to celebrate the history of lucha libre and features a number of lucha libre legends invited to wrestled for CMLL for the shows. There has been a total of two events promoted under that name, with a third scheduled for December 6, 2019, all taking place on special editions of CMLL's Friday night Super Viernes shows at Arena México.

The November 17, 2017 Leyendas Mexicanas show was the first of the series, but CMLL had previously held shows featuring "legends" invited specifically for the event, especially for anniversary shows such as Arena Coliseo 70th Anniversary Show, Blue Panther 40th Anniversary Show, Atlantis 35th Anniversary Show, Negro Casas 40th Anniversary Show that all featured "legends" booked by CMLL for special appearances.

As part of their celebration some wrestlers, who had previously been unmasked by losing a Lucha de Apuestas match, were given permission by the Mexico City professional wrestling commission to wear their mask again for one night. The wrestling mask has always held a sacred place in lucha libre, carrying with it a mystique and anonymity beyond what it means to wrestlers elsewhere in the world. The ultimate humiliation a luchador can suffer is to lose a Lucha de Apuestas, or bet match. Following a loss in a Lucha de Apuesta match the masked wrestler would be forced to unmask, state their real name and then would be unable to wear that mask while wrestling anywhere in Mexico. Wrestlers who worked the shows wearing their masks again include Mano Negra, Cien Caras and Máscara Año 2000.

Rayo de Jalisco Jr., Villano IV. El Canek, and Máscara Año 2000 have worked the main event of all Leyendas Mexicanas shows so far. In contrast Los Diabolicos (El Gallego, Rocky Santana, and Romano Garcia) have worked the opening match of all three shows, twice against Trio Fantasia (Super Muñeco, Super Pinocho, and Super Raton) and once against Super Muñeco, Ricky Boy, and Skayde. El Solar, Super Astro, Mano Negra, and Fuerza Guerrera have also worked all three shows, albeit not in the main event. Of the remaining leyendas, El Satánico and Negro Navarro have worked two shows and Octagón, Dos Caras, Cien Caras, Jerry Estrada, and Tinieblas Jr. have only worked one show as of the 2019 Leyendas Mexicanas event.

== Dates, venues, and main events ==
| Event | Date | City | Venue | Main Event | Ref(s). |
|---|---|---|---|---|---|
| 2016 | September 16 | Mexico City | Arena México | El Canek, Dos Caras, and Rayo de Jalisco Jr. vs. Los Hermanos Dinamita (Cien Caras, Máscara Año 2000, and Universo 2000) | |
| 2017 | November 17 | Mexico City | Arena México | Dos Caras, Rayo de Jalisco Jr., and Villano IV vs. El Canek and Los Hermanos Dinamitas (Cien Caras and Máscara Año 2000) | |
| 2018 | November 30 | Mexico City | Arena México | Atlantis, Blue Panther and Rayo de Jalisco Jr. vs. El Canek, Máscara Año 2000 and Villano IV | |
| 2019 | December 6 | Mexico City | Arena México | Rayo de Jalisco Jr., Tinieblas Jr., and Villano IV vs. El Canek, Fuerza Guerrera, and Máscara Año 2000 | |
