= CMLL Leyendas Mexicanas (2017) =

2017 Mexican professional wrestling show

- Officia poster depicting most of the "legends" appearing on the show
- Promotion: Consejo Mundial de Lucha Libre
- Date: November 17, 2017
- City: Mexico City, Mexico
- Venue: Arena México

Pay-per-view chronology
← Previous; Día de Muertos	Next → La Copa Junior

Leyendas Mexicanas chronology
← Previous —	Next → 2018

Leyendas Mexicanas (2017) was a professional wrestling super card show that was held on November 17, 2017 in Arena México in Mexico City, Mexico. . The show will be produced and scripted by the Mexican professional wrestling promotion Consejo Mundial de Lucha Libre (CMLL; Spanish for "World Wrestling Council"). The show celebrated the history of lucha libre in Mexico and saw the return of several wrestlers who had not worked for CMLL in a long time.

Four out of the six matches on the show featured non-CMLL wrestlers invited for the lucha libre celebration. In the main event, an all-legends match, Dos Caras, Rayo de Jalisco Jr., and Villano IV defeated El Canek and Los Hermanos Dinamitas (Cien Caras and Máscara Año 2000) by disqualification. On the undercard CMLL regular Negro Casas teamed up with legends Fuerza Guerrera and El Satánico to take on CMLL main stay Blue Panther and legends Mano Negra and Octagón. In the third match of the show El Solar and Súper Astro wrestled Black Terry and Virus and in the opening match Trio Fantasia (Super Muñeco, Super Pinocho, and Super Raton) defeated Los Diabolicos (El Gallego, Rocky Santana, and Romano Garcia).

== Production ==
=== Background ===
The Mexican wrestling company Consejo Mundial de Lucha Libre (Spanish for "World Wrestling Council"; CMLL) first held a show under the name Leyendas Mexicanas ("Mexican Legends") in November 2017, The Leyendas Mexicanas shows feature various lucha libre "legends" and celebrates the history of CMLL.

While the name was not used until 2017 CMLL has often held shows featuring and honoring "legends" of Lucha Libre, especial for anniversary shows such as Arena Coliseo 70th Anniversary Show, Blue Panther 40th Anniversary Show, Atlantis 35th Anniversary Show, Negro Casas 40th Anniversary Show that all featured "legends" booked by CMLL for special appearances.

=== Storylines ===
The event featured six professional wrestling matches with different wrestlers involved in pre-existing scripted feuds, plots and storylines. Wrestlers portray as either heels (referred to as rudos in Mexico, those that portray the "bad guys") or faces (técnicos in Mexico, the "good guy" characters) as they followed a series of tension-building events, which culminate in a wrestling match or series of matches.

== Event ==
In the opening match Trio Fantasia (Super Muñeco, Super Pinocho, and Super Raton) defeated Los Diabolicos (El Gallego, Rocky Santana, and Romano Garcia), Neither team had worked for CMLL on a regular basis for decades. The third fall ended in a draw between the teams of El Solar/Súper Astro and Black Terry/Virus. The teams split the first two falls between then, leading to a third fall where Virus and Solar both ended up with their shoulders pinned to the mat leading to the draw.

In the main event, an all-legends match, saw Dos Caras, Rayo de Jalisco Jr., and Villano IV face off against El Canek and Los Hermanos Dinamitas (Cien Caras and Máscara Año 2000.During the final fall of the main event, Nueva Generacion Dinamitas (El Cuatrero, Sansón, and Forastero) ran to the ring and attacked Rayo de Jalisco Jr. as he had their uncle, Cien Caras, pinned, leading to a disqualification loss for Cien Caras, Máscara Año 2000 and El Canek. Following the match Rayo de Jalisco Jr. challenged Cien Caras to a one-on-one match, which Caras subsequently accepted.

== Results ==
No.	Results	Stipulations	Times
1	Trio Fantasia (Super Muñeco, Super Pinocho, and Super Raton) defeated Los Diabolicos (El Gallego, Rocky Santana, and Romano Garcia)	Six-man "Lucha Libre rules" tag team match	17:42
2	Guerrero Maya Jr. and Los Divino Laguneros (Blue Panther Jr. and The Panther defeated Hechicero, Misterioso Jr., and El Sagrado	Six-man "Lucha Libre rules" tag team match	18:15
3	El Solar and Súper Astro vs. Black Terry and Virus ended in a draw	Tag team match	18:08
4	Fuerza Guerrera, Negro Casas, and El Satánico defeated Blue Panther, Mano Negra, and Octagón	Six-man "Lucha Libre rules" tag team match	11:56
5	Dragon Lee, Rush, Volador Jr. defeated Los Guerreros Laguneros (Euforia, Gran Guerrero, and Último Guerrero)	Six-man "Lucha Libre rules" tag team match	10:23
6	Dos Caras, Rayo de Jalisco Jr., and Villano IV defeated El Canek and Los Hermanos Dinamitas (Cien Caras and Máscara Año 2000) by disqualification	Six-man "Lucha Libre rules" tag team match	10:44
