= WWA Middleweight Championship =

Professional wrestling championship

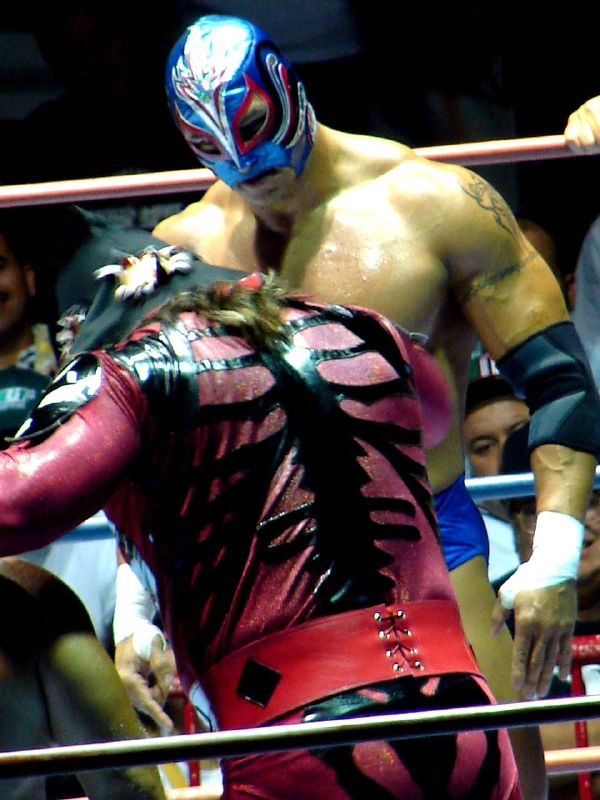
- Olímpico held one of the disputed titles at one point

Details
- Promotion: Universal Wrestling Association (UWA); Mexican Independent circuit
- Date established: 1987
- Current champions: Averno (Main Branch); Ministro de la Muerte (Mexico City/Monterrey branch)
- Date won: September 15, 2015 (Main Branch); September 28, 2014 (Mexico City/Monterrey branch)
Statistics
- First champion: Super Muñeco
- Most reigns: Mystico de Juarez, Nicho el Millonario (2 reigns) (Main Branch); Tigre Universitario (4 reigns) (Mexico City/Monterrey branch)

The WWA World Middleweight Championship (Campeonato de peso Medio WWA in Spanish) is a secondary professional wrestling championship promoted by the Mexican Lucha Libre wrestling-based promotion World Wrestling Association (WWA) since 1987. The official definition of the middleweight weight class in Mexico is between 82 kg (181 lb) and 87 kg (192 lb), but is not always strictly enforced. (Note: The most recent case of this is Mephisto holding the CMLL World Welterweight Championship, a belt with a 78 kg (172 lb) upper limit, despite weighing 90 kg (200 lb).)

As it was a professional wrestling championship, the championship was not won not by actual competition, but by a scripted ending to a match determined by the bookers and match makers. (Note: Hornbaker (2016) p. 550: "Professional wrestling is a sport in which match finishes are predetermined. Thus, win–loss records are not indicative of a wrestler's genuine success based on their legitimate abilities – but on now much, or how little they were pushed by promoters") On occasion the promotion declares a championship vacant, which means there is no champion at that point in time. This can either be due to a storyline, (Note: Duncan & Will (2000) p. 271, Chapter: Texas: NWA American Tag Team Title [World Class, Adkisson] "Championship held up and rematch ordered because of the interference of manager Gary Hart") or real life issues such as a champion suffering an injury being unable to defend the championship, (Note: Duncan & Will (2000) p. 20, Chapter: (United States: 19th Century & widely defended titles – NWA, WWF, AWA, IW, ECW, NWA) NWA/WCW TV Title "Rhodes stripped on 85/10/19 for not defending the belt after having his leg broken by Ric Flair and Ole & Arn Anderson") or leaving the company. (Note: Duncan & Will (2000) p. 201, Chapter: (Memphis, Nashville) Memphis: USWA Tag Team Title "Vacant on 93/01/18 when Spike leaves the USWA.")

Super Muñeco was the first Middleweight champion, winning it in 1987. It was defended throughout Mexico and Japan during the 1980s and 90s, but had been defended almost exclusively in Tijuana, Mexico since 2001. A separate version has been defended in the Mexico City-Monterrey area since 2002 when Blue Panther began defending a title labelled the WWA Middleweight Championship. Since the WWA titles have been largely unsanctioned since the late 1990s it means that they can be defended on any wrestling show, not just limited to WWA promoted shows.

== Title history ==
Key
No.	Overall reign number
Reign	Reign number for the specific champion
Days	Number of days held
N/A	Unknown information
†	Championship change is unrecognized by the promotion
+	Current reign is changing daily

No.	Champion	Championship change			Reign statistics		Notes	Ref.
No.	Champion	Date	Event	Location	Reign	Days	Notes	Ref.
1	Super Muñeco	1987	Live event	N/A	1			(Note: Duncan & Will (2000) p. 400, Chapter: "Mexico: WWA Middleweight Title")
Championship history is unrecorded from 1987 to July 1990.
2	Super Astro	July 1990	Live event	(Note: The location of the title change has not been captured as part of the documentation.)	1	(Note: The exact date on which Super Astro won the championship is unknown, placing the reign between 115 and 145 days.)		
3	Blue Demon Jr.	November 23, 1990	Live event	Villahermosa, Mexico	1	(Note: The exact date on which Blue Demon Jr. vacated the championship is unknown, placing his reign between 190 and 219 days.)		
—	Vacated	June 1991	—	—	—	—	Championship vacated for unknown reasons	
Championship history is unrecorded from June 1991 to March 1996.
4	Ultraman 2000	March 1996	Live event		1	(Note: The exact date on which Ultraman 2000 won, and vacated the title is unknown, placing the reign between 92 and 147 days.)		
—	Vacated	April 1996	—	—	—	—	Title vacated when Ultraman 2000 changed ring persona to "Damián 666"	
5	Piloto Suicida	July 1996	Live event	N/A	1	(Note: The exact date on which Piloto Suicida won the title is unknown, placing his title reign between 1 and 25 days.)	Unknown who Pioloto Suicida defeated to win the vacant title.	
6	The Great Sasuke	July 27, 1996	Live event	Sakata, Japan	1	10		
—	Vacated	August 16, 1996	—	—	—	—	Championship vacated August when the Great Sasuke fractured his skull during a match.	
7	El Pantera	August 17, 1996	Live event	Noshiro, Japan	1	0		
—	Vacated	August 17, 1996	—	—	—	—	Pantera surrenders the title immediately after winning it due to injury.	
8	Super Boy	August 23, 1996	Live event	Gosen, Japan	1		Defeated Naohiro Hoshikawa to win the vacant title.	
Championship history is unrecorded from August 23, 1996 to 1997.
9	Psicosis	(Note: Records do not indicate when Psicosis won the title, just that he did.)	Live event	N/A	1			
10	El Salsero	February 16, 1997	Live event	Juarez, Mexico	1	0		
Championship history is unrecorded from February 16, 1997 to 2001.
11	El Solar	2001	Live event	Juarez, Mexico	1	(Note: The exact date on which El Solar won and lost the title is unknown, placing his reign between 1 and 364 days.)		
12	Kiss	2001	Live event	Tijuana, Mexico	1	0		
Championship history is unrecorded from 2001 to June 6, 2003.
13	Raging Dawg	June 6, 2003	Live event	Tijuana, Mexico	1	84	Defeated Nicho el Millonario to win the vacant title.	
14	Nicho el Millonario	August 29, 2003	Live event	Tijuana, Mexico	2	184	Previously won the title as "Psicosis".	
15	Mystico de Juarez	February 29, 2004	Live event	Ciudad Juarez, Mexico	1	(Note: The exact date on which Mystico de Juarez was stripped of the title is unknown, placing his title reign between 1 day and 284 days.)		
—	Vacated	March 2004	—	—	—	—	Mystico is stripped of the championship for being unable to defend the title in Tijuana.	
16	Rayman	December 10, 2004	Live event	Tijuana, Mexico	1	679	Defeated Ángel Blanco Jr. to win the vacant title.	
17	Ángel Blanco Jr.	October 20, 2006	Live event	Tijuana, Mexico	1	491		
18	Místico	February 23, 2008	Live event	Ensenada, Mexico	2	(Note: The exact date on which Mystico de Juarez vacated the title is unknown, placing the title reign between 313 and 362 days.)	Defeated Nicho el Millonario to win the title.	
—	Vacated	2009	—	—	—	—	Mystico is stripped of the championship for unknown reasons.	
19	Olímpico	February 20, 2009	Live event	Puebla, Mexico	1	1,547	Defeated Ángel Blanco Jr. to win the vacant title.	
Championship history is unrecorded from February 20, 2009 to May 17, 2013.
20	T.J. Boy	May 17, 2013	Live event	Tijuana, Mexico	1	827	Defeated Steve Pain to win the title.	
21	Toxico	August 22, 2015	Live event	Lerdo, Durango	1	(Note: The exact date on which Toxico lost the championship is unknown, placing the reign between 1 day and 24 days.)		
Championship history is unrecorded from August 22, 2015 to 2015.
22	Myzteziz		Live event		1		Unclear whom he defeated to win the championship or when	
23	Averno	September 16, 2015	Live event	Nezahualcoyotl, Mexico	1	3,621		

=== Mexico City/Monterrey version ===
Key
No.	Overall reign number
Reign	Reign number for the specific champion
Days	Number of days held
N/A	Unknown information
†	Championship change is unrecognized by the promotion
+	Current reign is changing daily

No.	Champion	Championship change			Reign statistics		Notes	Ref.
No.	Champion	Date	Event	Location	Reign	Days	Notes	Ref.
1	Blue Panther	May 2002	Live event	Nuevo León	2	(Note: The exact date on which Blue Panther started to defend the title is unknown, placing his title reign between 1 day and 8 days.)		
2	Charles Lucero	May 9, 2004	Live event	Nuevo León	1	203		
3	Tigre Universitario	November 28, 2004	Live event	Nuevo León	1	182		
4	Charles Lucero	May 29, 2005	Live event	Nuevo León	2	147		
5	Tigre Universitario	October 23, 2005	Live event	Nuevo León	2	777		
6	Rey Hechicero	December 9, 2007	Live event	Nuevo León	1	140		
7	Tigre Universitario	April 27, 2008	Live event	Nuevo León	3	474		
8	Charles Lucero	August 14, 2009	Live event	Nuevo León	3	372+		
Championship history is unrecorded from August 14, 2009 to 2010.
9	Tigre Universitario	2010	Live event		4	(Note: The exact date on which Tigre Universitario won the championship is unknown, placing the reign between 1 day and 372 days.)	Unclear who he defeated to win the championship	
10	Panthro	August 22, 2010	Live event	Monterrey	1	644	Defeated Tigre Universitario to win the title.	
11	Monje Negro Jr.	May 27, 2012	Live event	Monterrey	1	644		
Championship history is unrecorded from May 27, 2012 to 2014.
12	Silver Star		Live event		1	(Note: The exact date on which Silver Star won the championship is unknown, placing the reign between 1 day and 557 days.)	Unclear who he defeated to win the title	
13	Charles Lucero	March 2, 2014	Live event	Monterrey	4	84		
Championship history is unrecorded from March 2, 2014 to 2014.
14	Potro Jr.		Live event		1	(Note: The exact date on which Potro Jr. won the championship is unknown, placing the reign between 1 day and 83 days.)	Unclear who he defeated to win the championship	
15	Ángel Dorado Jr.	May 25, 2014	Live event	Monterrey	1	126		
15	Ministro de la Muerte	September 28, 2014	Live event	Monterrey	1	3,974	Defeated 10 wrestlers in a battle royal.	
