= El Hijo de Blue Panther =

Mexican professional wrestler

Personal information
- Born: Unrevealed; 2001 (age 24–25) Torreón, Coahuila

Professional wrestling career
- Ring name(s): El Hijo de Blue Panther; Cachorro; Cachorro Lagunero
- Trained by: Blue Panther; Panterita del Ring
- Debut: August 18, 2019 (documented)

El Hijo de Blue Panther, previously known as Cachorro Lagunero, or simply Cachorro (born 2001 in Torreón) is a Mexican professional wrestler currently working for the Mexican promotion Consejo Mundial de Lucha Libre (CMLL), portraying a tecnico ("Good guy") wrestling character. His real name is not a matter of public record, as is often the case with masked wrestlers in Mexico where their private lives are kept a secret from the wrestling fans.

El Hijo de Blue Panther is the younger brother of Blue Panther Jr. and Black Panther, son of Blue Panther as well as a cousin of the late Black Warrior.

== Career ==
In interviews, he mentioned training and working smaller shows for four years in preparation for his CMLL debut. Both in Arena Olímpico Laguna in Torreón and later in the CMLL school in Mexico City. He has also described his style as more aerial than that of his brothers.

=== Consejo Mundial de Lucha Libre (2021–present) ===
Cachorro Lagunero made his debut in Arena México on May 28, 2021, during a pandemic-era show as part of a Copa Dinastías tournament, where he teamed with his father Blue Panther. Since making his debut, Cachorro has been regularly working the opening matches on CMLL TV shows, rarely getting any exposure. However, in May 2023 he scored consecutive victories over Retro and Dr. Karonte II in singles matches during Arena México Sunday shows.

October 4, 2023, as part of his father Blue Panthers 45th anniversary as a wrestler, Blue Panther announced that Cachorro would from here on out be known as Hijo de Blue Panther. This was confirmed on CMLL Informa, CMLL's weekly interview show.
