= CMLL 85th Anniversary Show =

Mexican professional wrestling show

- Promotional poster featuring various CMLL and ROH wrestlers
- Promotion: Consejo Mundial de Lucha Libre
- Date: September 14, 2018
- City: Mexico City, Mexico
- Venue: Arena México

Event chronology
← Previous; Negro Casas 40th Anniversary Show	Next → International Gran Prix

CMLL Anniversary Shows chronology
← Previous; 84th Anniversary	Next → 86th Anniversary

The CMLL 85th Anniversary Show (Spanish: 85. Aniversario de CMLL) was a major professional wrestling pay-per-view (PPV), scripted and produced by the Mexican lucha libre wrestling company Consejo Mundial de Lucha Libre (CMLL; Spanish for "World Wrestling Council") that took place on September 14, 2018. The show took place in CMLL's home arena Arena México in Mexico City, Mexico. The show is the biggest show of the year for CMLL, considered their version of the Super Bowl or WrestleMania. The CMLL Anniversary Show is the longest-running annual professional wrestling show.

The main event of the show was a tag team Lucha de Apuestas, or "bet match", where Matt Taven and Volador Jr. faced Rush and Bárbaro Cavernario, in a match where both wrestlers on the losing team have to shave themselves bald after the match. The show features five additional matches, including a match for the CMLL World Trios Championship.

== Production ==
=== Background ===
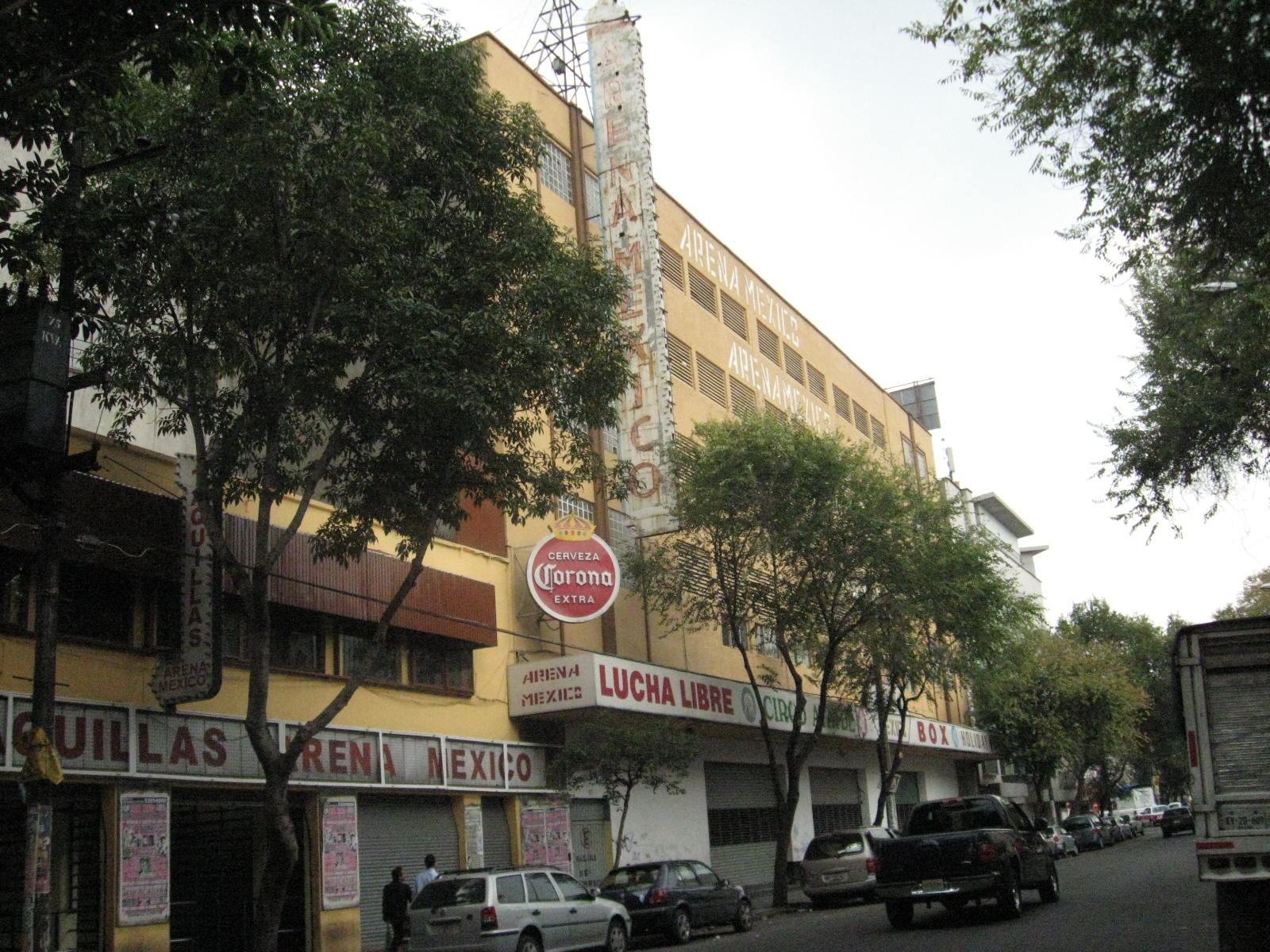
Arena México, CMLL's main venue and location of the 85th Anniversary Show

The Mexican Lucha libre (professional wrestling) company Consejo Mundial de Lucha Libre (CMLL) started out under the name Empresa Mexicana de Lucha Libre ("Mexican Wrestling Company"; EMLL), founded by Salvador Lutteroth in 1933. Lutteroth, inspired by professional wrestling shows he had attended in Texas, decided to become a wrestling promoter and held his first show on September 21, 1933, marking what would be the beginning of organized professional wrestling in Mexico. Lutteroth would later become known as "the father of Lucha Libre" . A year later EMLL held the EMLL 1st Anniversary Show, starting the annual tradition of the Consejo Mundial de Lucha Libre Anniversary Shows that have been held each year ever since, most commonly in September. Over the years the anniversary show would become the biggest show of the year for CMLL, akin to the Super Bowl for the National Football League (NFL) or WWE's WrestleMania event. The first anniversary show was held in Arena Modelo, which Lutteroth had bought after starting EMLL. In 1942–43 Lutteroth financed the construction of Arena Coliseo, which opened in April 1943. The EMLL 10th Anniversary Show was the first of the anniversary shows to be held in Arena Coliseo. In 1956 Lutteroth had Arena México built in the location of the original Arena Modelo, making Arena México the main venue of EMLL from that point on. Starting with the EMLL 23rd Anniversary Show, all anniversary shows except for the EMLL 46th Anniversary Show have been held in the arena that would become known as "The Cathedral of Lucha Libre". On occasion EMLL held more than one show labelled as their "Anniversary" show, such as two 33rd Anniversary Shows in 1966. Over time the anniversary show series became the oldest, longest-running annual professional wrestling show. In comparison, WWE's WrestleMania is only the fourth oldest still promoted show (CMLL's Arena Coliseo Anniversary Show and Arena México anniversary shows being second and third). EMLL was supposed to hold the EMLL 52nd Anniversary Show on September 20, 1985 but Mexico City was hit by a magnitude 8.0 earthquake. EMLL canceled the event both because of the general devastation but also over fears that Arena México might not be structurally sound after the earthquake.

When Jim Crockett Promotions was bought by Ted Turner in 1988 EMLL became the oldest still active promotion in the world. In 1991 EMLL was rebranded as "Consejo Mundial de Lucha Libre" and thus held the CMLL 59th Anniversary Show, the first under the new name, on September 18, 1992. Traditionally CMLL holds their major events on Friday Nights, replacing their regularly scheduled Super Viernes show.

With the partnership between Ring of Honor and CMLL this event will air live on Honor Club

=== Storylines ===
The 85th Anniversary Show featured six professional wrestling matches scripted by CMLL with some wrestlers involved in scripted feuds. The wrestlers portray either heels (referred to as rudos in Mexico, those that play the part of the "bad guys") or faces (técnicos in Mexico, the "good guy" characters) as they perform.

== Reception ==
Chris Aiken, reviewing the show for the Wrestling Observer, noted that "the show itself delivered on action." but also noted that "The tone and vibe was never on par with some previous CMLL anniversary shows" and concluded that it was "an easily enjoyable card with some great matches."

== Results ==
No.	Results	Stipulations	Times
1	La Jarochita, Marcela and Princesa Sujey defeated Dalys la Caribeña, La Maligna and Reyna Isis	Six-woman "Lucha Libre rules" tag team match	—
2	Ángel de Oro, Audaz and Niebla Roja defeated La Peste Negra (Negro Casas, El Felino) and Mephisto	Six-man "Lucha Libre rules" tag team match	11:41
3	Nueva Generación Dinamita (El Cuatrero, Forastero and Sansón) defeated Atlantis, Místico and El Soberano	Six-man "Lucha Libre rules" tag team match	—
4	The Cl4n (Ciber the Main Man, The Chris and Sharlie Rockstar) defeated Los Guerreros Laguneros (c) (Gran Guerrero, Euforia and Último Guerrero)	Six-man "Lucha Libre rules" tag team match for the CMLL World Trios Championship	11:32
5	Diamante Azul and Los Lucha Bros (King Phoenix and Penta el 0M) defeated Carístico, El Hijo de L.A. Park and L.A. Park	Six-man "Lucha Libre rules" tag team match	19:01
6	Rush and Bárbaro Cavernario defeated Matt Taven and Volador Jr.	Best two-out-of-three falls tag team Lucha de Apuestas, hair vs. hair match	23:04
(c) / – the champion(s) heading into the match

== See also ==
- 2018 in professional wrestling
