= Negro Casas 40th Anniversary Show =

Professional wrestling show

- Official poster for the event
- Promotion: Consejo Mundial de Lucha Libre
- Date: August 3, 2018
- City: Mexico City, Mexico
- Venue: Arena México
- Attendance: 16,500

Pay-per-view chronology
← Previous; Atlantis 35th Anniversary Show	Next → CMLL 85th Anniversary Show

The Negro Casas 40th Anniversary Show, or more properly Funcion Homenaje a Atlantis por sus 40 Años como luchador (Spanish for "Tribute to Negro Casas for 40 years as a wrestler") was a professional wrestling super card held on August 3, 2018. The show was produced and scripted by the Mexican professional wrestling promotion Consejo Mundial de Lucha Libre (CMLL: Spanish for "World Wrestling Council") and took place at Arena México in Mexico City, Mexico. The special edition of CMLL's Super Viernes show honored CMLL wrestler Negro Casas for reaching his 40th anniversary as a professional wrestler.

While Negro Casas was honored at the show he did not wrestle in the main event, instead he teamed up with Atlantis and Blue Panther, defeating Fuerza Guerrera, Octagón and El Solar in the fourth match of the night. In the semi-main event match Volador Jr. regained the NWA World Historic Welterweight Championship from Matt Taven. In the main event Los Lucha Bros (King Phoenix and Penta el 0M) teamed up with L.A. Park to defeat Rush and Ring of Honor representatives The Briscoe Brothers (Jay Briscoe and Mark Briscoe). The show featured three additional matches.

== Production ==
=== Background ===
Negro Casas, real name José Casas Ruiz, made his professional wrestling debut in the fall of 1978. Originally trained by his father Pepe Casas, Negro Casas would often team up with his brothers El Felino and Heavy Metal. He would later start a heated rivalry with El Hijo del Santo, a rivalry that led to Negro Casas losing a Lucha de Apuestas to El Hijo del Santo. The rivalry led to a long-term successful partnership between the two, winning the CMLL World Tag Team Championship three times. Casas lost another high-profile Lucha de Apuestas match to Místico in the main event of the CMLL 76th Anniversary Show, one of the matches that helped cement Místico as one of the top names in lucha libre. He later formed the group La Peste Negra, teaming with his brother El Felino and Mr. Niebla. Over the years Casas has won the CMLL World Tag Team championship a total of six times, CMLL World Middleweight Championship twice, CMLL World Trios Championship, CMLL World Welterweight Championship, Mexican National Trios Championship, NWA World Historic Welterweight Championship, and the NWA World Historic Welterweight Championship

=== Storylines ===
The event featured six professional wrestling matches with different wrestlers involved in pre-existing scripted feuds, plots and storylines. Wrestlers were portrayed as either heels (referred to as rudos in Mexico, those that portray the "bad guys") or faces (técnicos in Mexico, the "good guy" characters) as they followed a series of tension-building events, which culminated in a wrestling match or series of matches.

== Aftermath ==
After the NWA World Historic Welterweight Championship loss Matt Taven turned "face" (good guy) when he saved Volador Jr. after he was attacked by Rush, together the two chased Rush from the ring. Over the subsequent weeks Volador Jr. and Matt Taven build a rivalry with Rush and his partner Bárbaro Cavernario that became the main event of CMLL's biggest show of 2018, the CMLL 85th Anniversary Show. Rush and Bárbaro Cavernario won the tag team Lucha de Apuestas, or bet match, when Taven attacked Volador Jr., forcing both Volador Jr. and Taven to be shaved bald as a result.

== Results ==
No.	Results	Stipulations	Times
1	Audaz and Fuego defeated Virus and Templario	Best two-out-of-three falls tag team match	12:55
2	Ángel de Oro, Blue Panther Jr. and Niebla Roja defeated Los Hijos del Infierno (Ephesto, Luciferno and Mephisto)	Best two-out-of-three falls six-man "Lucha Libre rules" tag team match	11:45
3	Carístico, El Hijo de L.A. Park and Místico defeated Nueva Generación Dinamitas El Cuatrero, Forastero and Sansón)	Best two-out-of-three falls six-man "Lucha Libre rules" tag team match	14:30
4	Atlantis, Blue Panther and Negro Casas defeated Fuerza Guerrera, Octagón and El Solar	Best two-out-of-three falls six-man, Relevos Increíbles tag team match	11:25
5	Volador Jr. defeated Matt Taven (c)	Best two-out-of-three falls match for the NWA Historic Welterweight Championship	16:40
6	Los Lucha Bros (King Phoenix and Penta el 0M) and L.A. Park defeated Rush and The Briscoe Brothers (Jay Briscoe and Mark Briscoe) by disqualification	Best two-out-of-three falls six-man "Lucha Libre rules" tag team match	19:35
(c) / – the champion(s) heading into the match
