= Super Muñeco =

Mexican professional wrestler (1962–2022)

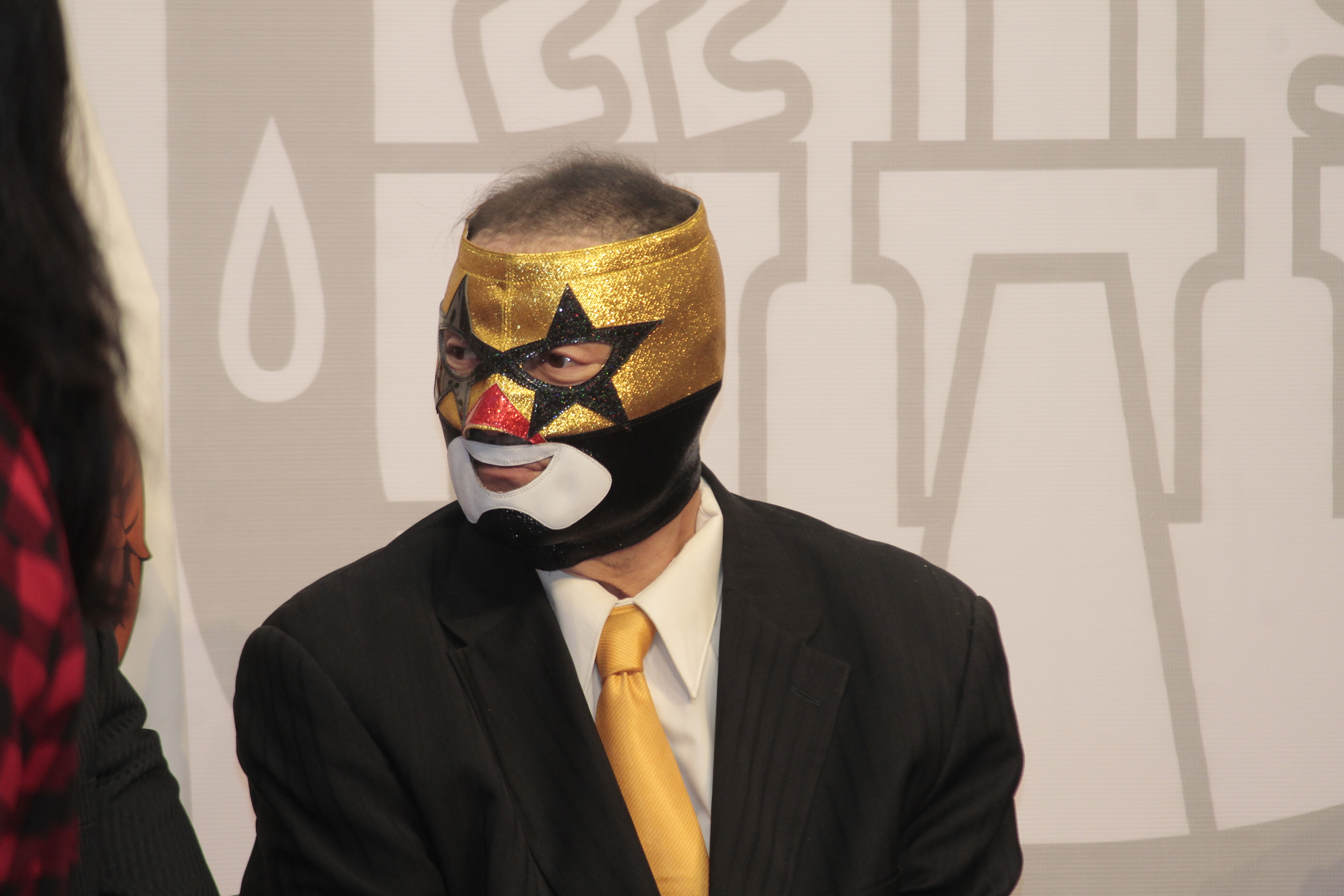
- Super Muñeco in 2018

Personal information
- Born: Hebert Alejandro Palafox Montiel; 10 April 1952 Mexico City, Mexico
- Died: 9 February 2022 (aged 69) Mexico City, Mexico

Professional wrestling career
- Ring name(s): El Sanguinario Jr. Super Muñeco
- Billed height: 1.70 m (5 ft 7 in)
- Billed weight: 98 kg (216 lb)
- Trained by: El Sanguinario
- Debut: March 22, 1982

Hebert Alejandro Palafox Montiel, best known by his ring name Super Muñeco (Super Doll) (10 April 1952 – 9 February 2022) was a Mexican professional wrestler. Super Muñeco is Spanish for "Super Doll", a comedic ring character based on a clown. Super Muñeco is best known for having the second highest number of Luchas de Apuestas "bet match" wins, having won the mask or hair of over 100 professional wrestlers. Per the tradition of masked wrestlers in Mexico, as he never lost an Apuestas match, Super's real name and identity were not revealed to the public until his death.

Super Muñeco was the son of professional wrestler El Sanguinario (The Bloodthirsty) and initially worked as Sanguinario Jr. before changing his ring persona to Super Muñeco. Muñeco's brothers wrestle or have wrestled as Sanguianrio, Jr. and Sanguinario, Jr. III, while a third brother wrestles as "Super Muñeco, Jr.". Super Muñeco was one third of the team Trío Fantasía (Fantasy Trio) along with Super Ratón and Super Pinocho, a trio with ring personas geared towards the kids in the crowd.

== Professional wrestling career ==
Muñeco made his professional wrestling debut on March 22, 1982, working under the name "Sanguinario, Jr." named after his father "El Sanguinario". Initially he teamed with his father, but did not make much headway under the "Sanguinario, Jr." name. One day in late 1983 Muñeco's girlfriend commented that it was odd he played a bloodthirsty Rudo (a villainous character or Heel) when it was so unlike who he really was. The comment set off an idea, based on a famous Mexican "Tramp Clown" called "El Tramposo", he developed a "wrestling clown" ring character called "Super Muñeco" (Super Doll in Spanish), complete with a mask that looked like a smiling clown face. With the Super Muñeco character he quickly became a Tecnico (a good guy or Face), especially popular with children. Initially, other wrestlers did not like the comedic persona nor did they like to work with and lose to "a clown" causing them to work "stiff", by actually punching him or twisting joints a bit harder than necessary to show their displeasure. In the mid-1980s Super Muñeco worked mainly at "Pavillón Azteca" and became one of the main attractions on their weekly shows. He became one of the first television stars when professional wrestling returned to regular television in the 1980s, helping the show Super Lunes (Super Monday) attract good ratings and drawing a full crowd whenever he was on the Pavillón Azteca shows.

Super Muñeco teamed up with Super Ráton (a wrestler using a Mighty Mouse ring persona) and Super Pinocho (Based on the character Pinocchio) to form Trio Fantasia, a comedy trio that became popular with fans. Together Trio Fantasia won the Distrito Federal Trios Championship and the AWWA Trios Championship. The team also worked against other teams with similar kid-oriented comedy themes, drawing full houses for their storyline feud with Los Tortugas Ninja (four men wearing Teenage Mutant Ninja Turtles costumes), the storyline even saw Trio Fantasia team up with the promising local "Coliseo 2000" to defeat Los Tortugas in a Luchas de Apuestas, mask vs. mask, match. Trio Fantasia would also unmask Los Thundercats (a trio wrestling as Leono, Panthro and Tigro from the ThunderCats cartoon). In the early 1990s Trio Fantasia began working for Asistencia Asesoría y Administración (AAA), a professional wrestling promotion with a reputation of using ring personas that were more child-friendly, such as "Los Power Raiders" (A group of Power Rangers imitators). In AAA Super Pinocho intentionally unmasked La Parka so that a photographer could get a picture of his face; This action caused him to be very unpopular with both wrestlers and promoters and he retired from wrestling. Super Ráton left AAA not long after leaving Super Muñeco as a singles competitor.

Muñeco began working a storyline against Los Payasos (the clowns), a group of Rudo clowns that were the complete opposite of everything Super Muñeco stood for. On May 22, 1994, Muñeco, Ángel Azteca, and El Hijo del Santo teamed up to win the Mexican National Trios Championship from Los Payasos. The makeshift trio held the title for four months before losing it to Los Payasos. On April 15, 1995, Super Muñeco, Rey Misterio, Jr., and Octagón defeated Los Destructores (Tony Arce, Vulcano, and Rocco Valente) to win the Mexican National Trios Title. They held it for three months before losing the championship to Fuerza Guerrera, Psicosis, and Blue Panther. After losing the Trios title Muñeco worked more as a singles wrestler, focusing on winning Luchas de Apuestas, adding mask and hair wins to his already then impressive list of wins. He worked on the Mexican Independent circuit, making appearances for various smaller promotions. Over the years he has won over 100 Luchas de Apuestas with over 80 mask wins; the most notable being the masks of rivals Coco Rojo and Coco Negro and Coco Verde of Los Payasos (although all of three may have not been the originals), Medico Asesino, Jr. and one of the numerous Hijo del Huracan Ramírez. Super Muñeco's Apuesta record is only surpassed by Estrella Blanca who has over 200 confirmed Luchas de Apuestas wins.

== Personal life and death ==
Super Muñeco was the son of Hebert Alejandro Palafox Montiel, who wrestled as El Sanguinario. One of his brothers works as Sanguinario Jr., the third to actually use the name; another brother used the name as well but now works as "El Tramposo", a "clown tramp" gimmick. The wrestler working as "Super Muñeco Jr." is not, as the name would otherwise suggest Muñeco's son, but a third brother who uses the name. Muñeco was married for over 20 years. It was his wife's suggestion that sparked the idea for Super Muñeco. Together the couple had at least one child.

He died in Mexico City on 9 February 2022, at the age of 69, from COVID-19, during the COVID-19 pandemic in Mexico.

== Championships and accomplishments ==
- Asistencia Asesoría y Administración
  - Mexican National Trios Championship (2 times) – with Ángel Azteca and El Hijo del Santo (1), Rey Misterio Jr. and Octagón (1)
- AWWA
  - AWWA World Junior Light Heavyweight Championship (1 time)
  - AWWA Trios Championship (1 time) – with Super Ratón and Super Pinocho
- Comision de Box y Lucha D.F.
  - Distrito Federal Trios Championship (1 time) – with Super Ratón and Super Pinocho)
- World Wrestling Association
  - WWA Middleweight Championship (1 time)
- Mexican local promotions
  - Caribbean Light Heavyweight Championship (1 time)
  - Centro Social Aragón Middleweight Championship (1 time)
  - Deportivo Carlos Zárante Middleweight Championship (1 time)
  - Los Reyes Estado de Mexico Middleweight Championship (1 time)
  - Plaza de Torero La Aurora Middleweight Championship (1 time)
  - Rio Verde Junior Light Heavyweight Championship (1 time)
  - San Pedro Iztacalco Welterweight Championship (1 time)
  - Veracruz Junior Light Heavyweight Championship (1 time)
  - WOWC Los Angeles Championship (1 time)

== Luchas de Apuestas record ==
Winner (wager)	Loser (wager)	Location	Event	Date	Notes
Super Muñeco (mask)	Intocable (mask)	Mexico City	Live event	N/A	
Super Muñeco (mask)	Hombre Lobo (mask)	Mexico City	Live event	N/A	
Super Muñeco (mask)	Maya Azteca (mask)	Mexico City	Live event	N/A	
Super Muñeco (mask)	Extravagante (mask)	Mexico City	Live event	N/A	
Super Muñeco (mask)	Dr. Tortura (mask)	Cuautla, Morelos	Live event	N/A	
Super Muñeco (mask)	Maquina Asesina (mask)	Mexico City	Live event	N/A	
Super Muñeco (mask)	El Guarura (mask)	N/A	Live event	N/A	
Super Muñeco (mask)	Rayos X (mask)	Oaxaca, Oaxaca	Live event	N/A	
Super Muñeco (mask)	Mago Blink (mask)	Mexico City	Live event	N/A	
Super Muñeco (mask)	Angel o Demonio(mask)	Acapulco, Guerrero	Live event	N/A	
Super Muñeco (mask)	Toro Salvaje (mask)	Xalapa, Veracruz	Live event	N/A	
Super Muñeco (mask)	Angel de la Muerte (mask)	Mexico City	Live event	N/A	
Super Muñeco (mask)	Fantasma Asesino (mask)	Camargo, Chihuahua	Live event	N/A	
Super Muñeco (mask)	Germano (mask)	Los Reyes Acaquilpan, Mexico State	Live event	N/A	
Super Muñeco (mask)	Kid Bravo (mask)	Alvarado, Veracruz	Live event	N/A	
Super Muñeco (mask)	Astro Azul (mask)	San Felipe, Baja California	Live event	N/A	
Super Muñeco (mask)	Caballero de la Muerte (mask)	Martínez de la Torre, Veracruz	Live event	N/A	
Super Muñeco (mask)	Mr. Atomo (mask)	Mexico City	Live event	N/A	
Super Muñeco (mask)	Enigma Dorado (mask)	Puebla, Puebla	Live event	N/A	
Super Muñeco (mask)	Dr. Asesino (mask)	Puebla, Puebla	Live event	N/A	
Super Muñeco (mask)	Galactus (mask)	Toluca, Mexico State	Live event	N/A	
Super Muñeco (mask)	Destroyer (mask)	N/A	Live event	N/A	
Super Muñeco (mask)	Black Star (mask)	Puebla, Puebla	Live event	N/A	
Super Muñeco (mask)	Angel de Puebla (mask)	Puebla, Puebla	Live event	N/A	
Super Muñeco (mask)	Cuervo (mask)	N/A	Live event	N/A	
Super Muñeco (mask)	Caballero Imperial (mask)	Parral, Chihuahua	Live event	N/A	
Super Muñeco (mask)	Super Camaro (mask)	Tampico, Tamaulipas	Live event	N/A	
Super Muñeco (mask)	Capitan Furia (mask)	Nogales, Sonora	Live event	N/A	
Super Muñeco (mask)	Emperador Azteca (mask)	Culiacán, Sinaloa	Live event	N/A	
Super Muñeco (mask)	The Police (mask)	Celaya, Guanajuato	Live event	N/A	
Super Muñeco (mask)	Leon de Oro (mask)	Guanajuato, Guanajuato	Live event	N/A	
Super Muñeco (mask)	Magnum (mask)	Irapuato, Guanajuato	Live event	N/A	
Super Muñeco (mask)	Guardia Imperial (mask)	Martínez de la Torre, Veracruz	Live event	N/A	
Super Muñeco (mask)	Killer Rock (mask)	Manzanillo, Colima	Live event	N/A	
Super Muñeco (mask)	Venganza India (mask)	Teziutlán, Puebla	Live event	N/A	
Super Muñeco (mask)	Zafiro Imperial (mask)	Poza Rica, Veracruz	Live event	N/A	
Super Muñeco (mask)	Kamikaze Ninja (mask)	Culiacán, Sinaloa	Live event	N/A	
Super Muñeco (mask)	Poder Galactico (mask)	Iguala, Guerrero	Live event	N/A	
Super Muñeco (mask)	Diabolico X (mask)	Tehuacán, Puebla	Live event	N/A	
Super Muñeco (mask)	Saturno(mask)	Isla Mujeres, Quintana Roo	Live event	N/A	
Super Muñeco (mask)	Tigre del Ring (mask)	Tampico, Tamaulipas	Live event	N/A	
Super Muñeco (mask)	Star Golden Falcon(mask)	Los Angeles, California	Live event	N/A	
Super Muñeco (mask)	Espantapajaros (mask)	Atlixco, Puebla	Live event	N/A	
Super Muñeco (mask)	Tigre Negro (mask)	Los Mochis, Sinaloa	Live event	N/A	
Super Muñeco (mask)	Trueno Negro (mask)	San Francisco del Rincon, Guanajuato	Live event	N/A	
Super Muñeco (mask)	Kaiser (mask)	N/A	Live event	N/A	
Super Muñeco (mask)	Principe Zaku (mask)	Oaxaca, Oaxaca	Live event	N/A	
Super Muñeco (mask)	Aguila Roja (mask)	Minatitlan, Veracruz	Live event	N/A	
Super Muñeco (mask)	Batman (mask)	Tepic, Nayarit	Live event	N/A	
Super Muñeco (mask)	Zodiaco (mask)	Cocoyoc, Morelos	Live event	N/A	
Super Muñeco (mask)	Huron (mask)	Ciudad Constitucion, Baja California Sur	Live event	N/A	
Super Muñeco (mask)	It (mask)	Villahermosa, Tabasco	Live event	N/A	
Super Muñeco (mask)	Soldado Nazi (mask)	Tepeji del Rio, Querétaro	Live event	N/A	
Super Muñeco (mask)	Sin Cara (mask)	San Juan de los Lagos, Jalisco	Live event	N/A	
Super Muñeco (mask)	Mancha Negra(mask)	Tuxtla Gutierrez, Chiapas	Live event	N/A	
Super Muñeco (mask)	El Zar de la Muerte (mask)	Mexicali, Baja California	Live event	N/A	
Super Muñeco (mask)	Mr. Kramer (mask)	Iguala, Guerrero	Live event	N/A	
Super Muñeco (mask)	Las Momias del Perú I and II (mask)	Tijuana, Baja California	Live event	N/A	
Super Muñeco (mask)	Mr. Kramer (mask)	Iguala, Guerrero	Live event	N/A	
Super Muñeco (mask)	Hijo de Black Shadow (mask)	Ciudad Juárez, Chihuahua	Live event	N/A	
Super Muñeco (mask)	Condor de Plata (mask)	N/A	Live event	N/A	
Super Muñeco (mask)	La Hormiga Azul (mask)	N/A	Live event	N/A	
Super Muñeco (mask)	Chacal (hair)	Los Reyes Acaquilpan, Mexico State	Live event	N/A	
Super Muñeco (mask)	Zafiro (hair)	N/A	Live event	N/A	
Super Muñeco (mask)	Oso Vikingo (hair)	N/A	Live event	N/A	
Super Muñeco (mask)	Rey Vudu (hair)	N/A	Live event	N/A	
Super Muñeco (mask)	Yoyo Garduño (hair)	N/A	Live event	N/A	
Super Muñeco (mask)	Rey America(hair)	N/A	Live event	N/A	
Super Muñeco (mask)	Adorable Rubí (hair)	N/A	Live event	N/A	
Super Muñeco (mask)	Principe Odin (hair)	N/A	Live event	N/A	
Super Muñeco (mask)	Comanche (hair)	N/A	Live event	N/A	
Super Muñeco (mask)	Carlos Plata (hair)	N/A	Live event	N/A	
Super Muñeco (mask)	Ray Richard (hair)	N/A	Live event	N/A	
Super Muñeco (mask)	Mohak (hair)	N/A	Live event	N/A	
Super Muñeco (mask)	Leon Rojo (mask)	N/A	Live event	N/A	
Super Muñeco (mask)	Barba Negra (mask)	N/A	Live event	N/A	
Super Muñeco (mask)	Dino Curtis (mask)	N/A	Live event	N/A	
Super Muñeco, Super Pinocho and Super Raton (masks)	Angel Mortal, El Bucles and ?? (masks)	N/A	Live event	N/A	
Super Muñeco (mask)	Killer Dog (mask)	Mexico City	Live event	June 14, 1984	
Super Muñeco (mask)	Conquistador (mask)	Mexico City	Live event	May 13, 1985	
Super Muñeco (mask)	Mazinger Z (mask)	Puebla, Puebla	Live event	February 26, 1988	
Super Muñeco (mask)	Azote Negro (mask)	Mexico City	Live event	June 20, 1986	
Super Muñeco (mask)	Nahur Kaliff (hair)	N/A	Live event	June 26, 1988	
Super Muñeco, Super Pinocho, Super Raton and Coliseo 2000 (masks)	Tortugas Ninja (I, II, III and IV) (mask)	Mexico City	Live event	December 2, 1990	
Super Muñeco (mask)	Espanto, Jr. (hair)	Torreón, Coahuila	Live event	June 2, 1991	
Super Muñeco (mask)	Popitekus (hair)	Tijuana, Baja California	Live event	June 21, 1991	
Super Muñeco, Super Pinocho and Super Raton (mask)	Los Thundercats (mask) (Leono, Panthro and Tigro)	Monterrey, Nuevo León	Live event	December 8, 1991	
Super Muñeco (mask)	Ultra Tiger (mask)	Tijuana, Baja California	Live event	April 1992	
Super Muñeco (mask)	Tornado Negro II (mask)	Huntington Park, California	Live event	December 26, 1994	(Note: Relevos suicidas: Lost match against Piloto Suicida and Sangre Fría.)
Super Muñeco (mask)	Asesino Negro (mask)	N/A	Live event	June 4, 1995	
Super Muñeco (mask)	Medico Asesino Jr. (mask)	Tijuana, Baja California	Live event	December 25, 1997	
Super Muñeco (mask)	Medico Asesino Jr. (hair)	Salem, Oregon	Live event	April 11, 1998	
Super Muñeco (mask)	El Hijo del Huracán Ramírez (mask)	Mexicali, Baja California	Live event	October 31, 1999	
Halloween (hair)	Super Muñeco (hair)	Tijuana, Baja California	Live event	November 26, 1999	(Note: Lucha del revels (Hair vs. Hair between two masked wrestlers).)
Super Muñeco (mask)	Mancha Negra (mask)	San Cristóbal de las Casas, Chiapas	Live event	June 17, 2000	
Super Muñeco (mask)	Escorpión Dorado (mask)	Poza Rica, Veracruz	Live event	March 16, 2003	
Super Muñeco, Super Pinocho and Super Raton (mask)	Los Black Hunters (I/II/III) (mask)	Cancún	Live event	May 7, 2004	
Super Muñeco (mask)	Cadaver I (mask)	Tabasco	Live event	July 1, 2004	
Super Muñeco (mask)	Fuerza Boricua (hair)	Mérida, Yucatán	Live event	May 14, 2006	(Note: This was originally scheduled for "Mask vs. Mask", but Fuerza Boricua was forced to unmask before the match by the State Athletic commission.)
Super Muñeco (mask)	Coco Negro (mask)	Tijuana, Baja California	Live event	January 19, 2007	
Super Muñeco (mask)	Halcon Rojo (mask)	Mérida, Yucatán	Live event	March 4, 2007	
Super Muñeco (mask)	Coco Rojo (mask)	Mexico City	Live event	March 10, 2007	
Super Muñeco (mask)	Bronco (hair)	Tampico, Tamaulipas	Live event	April 26, 2007	
Super Muñeco (mask)	Ku Klux Klan I (mask)	Tijuana, Baja California	Live event	June 1, 2007	(Note: Relevos Suicidas: Lost to El Hijo de Rey Misterio and Ninja.)
Super Muñeco (mask)	King Tiger (mask)	Unidad Agustin Millan, Toluca	Live event	June 28, 2007	
Super Muñeco and Super Pinocho (mask)	Coco Rojo and El Pandita (hair)	Manzanillo, Colima]	Live event	April 11, 2009	(Note: The finals of a "Losers advance" tournament/)
Super Muñeco and Axxel (mask)	Payaso Coco Verde and Payaso Cocolores (mask) (maybe not the originals!)	Guadalajara, Jalisco	Live event	December 12, 2009	
Súper Muñeco (mask)	Scorpio, Jr. (hair)	Tlalnepantla de Baz, Mexico State	Live event	October 6, 2012	(Note: Six-man tag team steel cage Masks vs. Hairs match, where Scorpio, Jr., Black Terry and Shu el Guerrero faced Súper Muñeco, Súper Pinocho and Súper Ratón.)
