= Atlantis 35th Anniversary Show =

Mexican professional wrestling supercard show

- Official poster of the event
- Promotion: Consejo Mundial de Lucha Libre
- Date: July 13, 2018
- City: Mexico City, Mexico
- Venue: Arena México
- Attendance: 15,500

Pay-per-view chronology
← Previous; Gran Alternativa	Next → Negro Casas 40th Anniversary Show

The Atlantis 35th Anniversary Show, or more properly Funcion Homenaje a Atlantis por 35 Años de carrera luchistica (Spanish for "Tribute to Atlantis for his 35 year career in wrestling") was a professional wrestling super card held on July 13, 2018. The show was produced and scripted by the Mexican professional wrestling promotion Consejo Mundial de Lucha Libre (CMLL: Spanish for "World Wrestling Council") and took place at Arena México in Mexico City, Mexico. The special edition of CMLL's Super Viernes show honored CMLL wrestler Atlantis for reaching his 35th anniversary as a professional wrestler.

While the event honored Atlantis he did not work the main event match, instead he teamed up with old partners Octagón and Rayo de Jalisco Jr. to defeat the team of Fuerza Guerrera, Máscara Año 2000 and Último Guerrero. The main event saw Los Ingobernables (Rush and El Terrible) defeat the Sky Team (Valiente and Volador Jr.) to with the CMLL World Tag Team Championship. The show featured four additional matches.

== Production ==
=== Background ===
Professional wrestler Atlantis made his in ring debut in the summer of 1983. Over the years the young, highly skilled wrestler rose through the ranks of CMLL, winning his first major Lucha de Apuestas, or "bet match", just over a year after his debut as he defeated Talismán in the main event of the EMLL 51st Anniversary Show. He would later main event the EMLL 56th Anniversary Show, teaming up with El Satánico to win the masks of Tierra Viento y Fuego and MS-1. He won his third anniversary show main event in 1991 when he defeated and unmasked Mano Negra at CMLL 60th Anniversary Show. In 2000 he deafted and unmasked Villano III in the main event of Juicio Final, in a match that was voted the Wrestling Observer match of the year. His list of high profile mask victories later included long-time rival Último Guerrero at CMLL 81st Anniversary Show and La Sombra at CMLL 82nd Anniversary Show.

=== Storylines ===
The event featured six professional wrestling matches with different wrestlers involved in pre-existing scripted feuds, plots and storylines. Wrestlers were portrayed as either heels (referred to as rudos in Mexico, those that portray the "bad guys") or faces (técnicos in Mexico, the "good guy" characters) as they followed a series of tension-building events, which culminated in a wrestling match or series of matches.

== Event ==
The fifth match of the night honored Atlantis as he teamed up with his old partners Octagón and Rayo de Jalisco Jr., neither of whom worked for CMLL on a regular basis at that point in time. To honor his partner Octagón wore an outfit where his traditional red color was replaced with the blue color associated with Atlantis. The trio faced off against Fuerza Guerrera, Máscara Año 2000 and Último Guerrero. For the night both Máscara Año 2000 and Último Guerrero wore their old wrestling masks that they had both lost years ago. After his team won Atlantis introduced his sons, Atlantis Jr. and El Hijo de Atlantis, to the CMLL crowd.

== Aftermath ==
The ongoing rivalry between Los Ingobernables and the Ibarra family (Volador Jr., L.A. Park, El Hijo de L.A. Park and Flyer) continued past the championship change, focusing more on Rush and Volador Jr. than previously. After the Negro Casas 40th Anniversary Show, Matt Taven and Bárbaro Cavernario were added to the mix, the latter stepping in to take El Terrible's place when he was injured. That feud that became the main event of CMLL's biggest show of 2018, the CMLL 85th Anniversary Show. Rush and Bárbaro Cavernario won the tag team Lucha de Apuestas, or bet match, when Taven attacked Volador Jr., forcing both Volador Jr. and Taven to be shaved bald as a result.

== Results ==
No.	Results	Stipulations
1	Metálico and Sangre Azteca defeated Príncipe Diamante and Súper Astro Jr.	Best two-out-of-three falls tag team match
2	Audaz, Fuego and Star Jr. defeated Kawato-San, Okumura and Universo 2000 Jr.	Six-man "Lucha Libre rules" tag team match
3	Dalys la Caribeña defeated La Jarochita	Lightning match (One fall, 10 minute time-limit match)
4	Carístico, Dragon Lee and Místico defeated La Peste Negra (Bárbaro Cavernario and Negro Casas) and Gran Guerrero	Six-man "Lucha Libre rules" tag team match
5	Atlantis, Octagón and Rayo de Jalisco Jr. defeated Fuerza Guerrera, Máscara Año 2000 and Último Guerrero	Six-man "Lucha Libre rules" tag team match
6	Los Ingobernables (Rush and El Terrible) defeated Sky Team (Valiente and Volador Jr.) (c)	Best two-out-of-three falls tag team match for the CMLL World Tag Team Championship
(c) / – the champion(s) heading into the match
