= Arena Coliseo 70th Anniversary Show =

Mexican professional wrestling supercard show

- Official poster for the event promoting the main event and special appearance of Rayo de Jalisco, Jr. and Universo 2000
- Promotion: Consejo Mundial de Lucha Libre
- Date: April 7, 2013
- City: Mexico City, Mexico
- Venue: Arena Coliseo

Event chronology
← Previous; Torneo Increibles de Parejas, Arena Puebla	Next → Torneo Gran Alternativa

On April 7, 2013, CMLL celebrated the Arena Coliseo's 70th Anniversary Show with a special professional wrestling event that featured a number of veteran wrestlers that did not usually work for CMLL such as Negro Navarro, Black Terry, Villano IV, Ray Mendoza, Jr., Universo 2000, Máscara Año 2000, and Rayo de Jalisco, Jr. working with a number of CMLL wrestlers. The main event of the show saw Dragón Rojo, Jr. defend the CMLL World Middleweight Championship against NWA World Historic Welterweight Champion La Sombra. The event commemorated the completion of Arena Coliseo on April 2, 1943, built by CMLL owner and founder Salvador Lutteroth. The show aired live on the Mexican television channel Terra.

== Background ==
The event featured six professional wrestling matches, in which some wrestlers are involved in pre-existing scripted feuds or storylines and others are teamed up with no particular backstory leading up to the match. Wrestlers themselves portray either villains (referred to as "Rudos" in Mexico) or fan favorites ("Tecnicos" in Mexico) as they compete in matches with pre-determined outcomes.

professional wrestling promoter Salvador Lutteroth began promoting wrestling, or Lucha libre events in Arena Modelo in 1933 as he founded Empresa Mexicana de Lucha Libre (EMLL). The building served as the main venue for Lutteroth's promotion from 1933 until the early 1940s when the success of Lucha Libre meant that Arena Model was becoming too small to accommodate the weekly shows. Lutteroth financed the building of a new arena with $40,000 that he had won in the national lottery. The building would sit on the location of República de Perú 77 in the Cuauhtémoc and was designed by Architect Francisco Bullman. Upon its completion in 1943 it was the first sports building in Mexico to have built in Air Conditioning. The building would hold 8,863 spectators for wrestling or boxing events and quickly gained the nickname the "Lagunilla Funnel" due to the design of the spectators stands in regards to the ring in the middle. The venue began hosting Boxing events only a few months after opening and for years would run both wrestling and boxing events throughout the year. The venue served as the main building for EMLL, hosting their Anniversary shows starting with their 10th Anniversary show in 1943 through their 22nd Anniversary show in 1955. From 1956 and forward Arena Coliseo became a secondary venue for EMLL, with the newly constructed Arena México taking over as the venue for all of EMLL's major shows. In 1979, for unknown reasons EMLL held their 46th Anniversary Show in Arena Coliseo instead of Arena México, marking the last major EMLL event held there. In the weeks leading up to the 70th anniversary of Arena Coliseo CMLL began promoting the history of the arena, detailing its rich history of both boxing and wrestling as well as its role in Women's wrestling in Mexico, the championship matches that had taken place in the arena over the years and the large number of Luchas de Apuestas matches that had taken place on the premises and finally the deaths of boxers and wrestlers in the actual arena.

The main event of the show would see reigning CMLL World Middleweight Champion Dragón Rojo, Jr. defend his championship against challenger La Sombra in a Best two-out-of three falls match. The two wrestlers had faced off multiple times in the past, most recently on January 20, 2013 during a CMLL/New Japan Pro-Wrestling co-promoted show in Japan called Fantastica Mania 2013. During the show La Sombra won the NWA World Historic Welterweight Championship from Dragón Rojo, Jr.

The fourth and fifth match of the show featured matches contested under best two-out-of-three falls six-man tag team rules and in each case featured one team representing CMLL and one team representing Los Independientes, or the Independent circuit that were not under contract with CMLL. Rayo de Jalisco, Jr. had worked CMLL's 2013 Homenaje a Dos Leyendas only a few weeks earlier, against Universo 2000 and the two independent, "old school" wrestlers found themselves on opposite sides once again. Rayo teamed up with CMLL regulars Atlantis and Diamante Azul while Universo 2000 teamed up with his brother Máscara Año 2000 and Ray Mendoza, Jr. On February 21, 2013, CMLL held a press conference to officially announce that the Homenaje a Dos Leyendas would pay tribute to Rayo de Jalisco ("The Lighting from Jalisco") and brought out Rayo's son, Rayo de Jalisco, Jr., as part of the announcement. Rayo de Jalisco, Jr. had not worked for CMLL since 2010 but made a special appearance due to the company honoring his father. During the press conference Rayo de Jalisco, Jr.'s long time rival Universo 2000 interrupted Rayo de Jalisco, Jr. and the two ended up challenging each other to a match that would take place at the 2013 Homenaje a Dos Leyendas, although the exact nature of the match was not announced at the time. The rivalry between the two wrestlers hailed back to at least 1997 where Universo 2000 defeated both Cien Caras and Rayo de Jalisco, Jr. to win the CMLL World Heavyweight Championship. After being masked since his debut in 1985 Universo 2000 lost a Lucha de Apuesta match to El Canek in the main event of the 71st Anniversary Show, on September 17, 2004, the match also included Rayo de Jalisco, Jr. and Dr. Wagner, Jr. and originally came about due to the Universo 2000/Rayo de Jalisco, Jr. rivalry. Following his unmasking Universo 2000 won the 2004 Leyenda de Azul (Blue legend tournament). In subsequent years both Universo 2000 and Rayo de Jalisco, Jr. left CMLL. In 2005 Rayo de Jalisco, Jr. suffered another serious injury, he injured both his knees in a match against Universo 2000's brother Máscara Año 2000, where his legs got caught on the ropes as he jumped out of the ring and he tore ligaments in both knees. The injury kept him out of the ring for almost half a year but in the end Rayo de Jalisco, Jr. was able to make a full recovery and return to the ring. The incident was used by several promoters as well as Rayo de Jalisco, Jr. himself to create more interest in matches between himself and Universo 2000, Cien Caras and Máscara Año 2000.At the Homenaje a Dos Leyendas show Rayo de Jalisco, Jr., Shocker, and Rush defeated the team of Universo 2000, Mr. Niebla and El Terrible by disqualification when Universo 2000 cheated. Ray Mendoza, Jr.'s appearance at the show was the subject of some controversy as he had held an official Retirement show a few weeks before, only to show up at the special CMLL event. He later explained that his poorly attended retirement show had ended up costing him $38,000 of his own money and thus felt he was forced to work this match to make some of the money back that he had lost.

The fourth match of the night would feature CMLL wrestlers Averno, Blue Panther, and Shocker team up to take on the "Old-school" team of Black Terry, Negro Navarro, and Villano IV. This match did not have a particular backstory, instead it paired up some CMLL wrestlers who were said to be working the classical mat style wrestling, especially Blue Panther, with three independent circuit workers who worked the same style of wrestling. The third match of the night was an all-female torneo cibernetico elimination match where the last women in the ring would be awarded the Trofeo Arena Coliseo 70 Aniversario cup. The match had the tecnica team of Marcela, Estrellita, Goya Kong, Dalys La Caribeña and Silueta take on the ruda team of La Amapola, Princesa Sugey, Princesa Blanca, Zeuxis, Tiffany. Estrellita and La Amapola had been on opposite sides of a long running feud that led to a Lucha de Apuestas match between the two at the 2013 Homenaje a Dos Leyendas show two weeks prior. The match was won by Estrellita and La Amapola was forced to have all her hair shaved off after the match. The Arena Coliseo 70th Anniversary Show marked the first time the two faced off since the Apuestas match. The second match of the night centered on the rivalry between Metálico and El Hijo del Signo as they were on opposite sides of a six-man tag team match. Metálico teamed up with fellow tecnicosHombre Bala Jr. and Super Halcón Jr. while Hijo del Signo partnered up with Nosferatu and Taurus for the match. El Hijo del Signo had begun targeting the masked Metálico in the week prior to the show, playing up the brash, arrogant rookie character that he portrayed, stating that Metálico was simply too old and useless. During their matches against each other Hijo del Signo would often go out of his way to attack Metálico, often tearing Metálico's mask apart or using other underhanded tactics to win. The opening match was announced as rookie tecnicos Oro, Jr. and Soberano Jr. would take on Espanto, Jr. and Guerrero Negro, Jr., with all four wrestlers being part of the Generacion 2012 class of wrestlers to graduate from the CMLL wrestling school.

== Event ==
During the show CMLL officials gave an award to one of the fans in attendance as he had also attended the first Arena Coliseo show 70 years prior. Oro, Jr. was originally announced for the opening match, but was replaced by Metatrón later on without any explanation given. Metatrón and Soberano Jr. defeated Espanto, Jr. and Guerrero Negro, Jr. two falls to one. During the second match of the night the storyline between Hijo del Signo and Metálico took center stage as most of the action centered on the two. In the second fall Hijo del Signo pulled Metálico's mask off, hoping to use the distraction to gain a pinfall, but instead he was disqualified when the referee saw the blatant rulebreaking by El Hijo del Signo.

Trofeo Arena Coliseo 70 Aniversario order of elimination

No.	Eliminated	By
1	Silueta	Zeuxis
2	Princesa Sugey	Estrellita
3	Zeuxis	Dalys La Caribeña
4	Dalys La Caribeña	Tiffany
5	Estrellita	La Amapola
6	Tiffany	Marcela
7	Marcela	Princesa Blanca
8	La Amapola	Goya Kong
9	Princesa Blanca	Goya Kong
10	Winner	Goya Kong

The independent wrestlers were well received by the Arena Coliseo crowd, cheering especially for the portions of the match where Blue Panther and Negro Navarro wrestled against each other. The match ended when Averno forced Black Terry to submit and Blue Panther forced Villano IV to submit to win the third fall. Afterwards the fans showed their appreciation of the match by throwing money into the ring, causing both Panther and Navarro to actually go into the seats to collect more money after the match. Both Panther and Navarro teased that they were going to continue to fight, which drew a favorable response from the crowd. Before the fifth match of the night Ray Mendoza, Jr. took the microphone and announced to the crowd that this would actually be his last match as a professional wrestler. Rayo de Jalisco and his team won both the second and third fall to win the entire match. In the main event the challenger La Sombra and the champion Dragón Rojo, Jr. quickly split the first two falls between them, tied up at 1–1. The third fall was longer than both the previous falls combined and finally saw Dragón Rojo, Jr. successfully defend the championship when he forced La Sombra to submit.

== Results ==
No.	Results	Stipulations
1	Metatrón and Soberano Jr. defeated Espanto, Jr. and Guerrero Negro, Jr.	Best two-out-of-three falls tag team match
2	Hombre Bala Jr., Metálico, and Super Halcón Jr. defeated El Hijo del Signo, Nosferatu, and Taurus by disqualification	Best two-out-of-three falls six-man lucha libre rules tag team match
3	Goya Kong defeated Marcela, Estrellita, Dalys La Caribeña, Silueta, La Amapola, Princesa Sugey, Princesa Blanca, Zeuxis, and Tiffany	10-woman Torneo cibernetico elimination match for the Trofeo Arena Coliseo 70 Aniversario
4	Averno, Blue Panther, and Shocker defeated Black Terry, Negro Navarro, and Villano IV	Best two-out-of-three falls six-man lucha libre rules tag team match
5	Atlantis, Diamante Azul and Rayo de Jalisco, Jr. defeated Ray Mendoza, Jr. and Los Hermanos Dinamita (Máscara Año 2000 and Universo 2000)	Best two-out-of-three falls six-man lucha libre rules tag team match
6	Dragón Rojo, Jr. (c) defeated La Sombra	Best two-out-of-three falls match for the CMLL World Middleweight Championship
(c) / – the champion(s) heading into the match
