= Blue Panther 40th Anniversary Show =

Mexican professional wrestling show

- Official poster for the event
- Promotion: Consejo Mundial de Lucha Libre
- Date: October 19, 2018
- City: Mexico City, Mexico
- Venue: Arena México

Pay-per-view chronology
← Previous; International Gran Prix	Next → Día de Muertos

The Blue Panther 40th Anniversary Show, or more properly Funcion Homenaje Festejano los 40 Años de Blue Panther (Spanish for "Tribute and celebration of 40 years of Blue Panther") was a professional wrestling super card held on October 19, 2018. The show was produced and scripted by the Mexican professional wrestling promotion Consejo Mundial de Lucha Libre (CMLL: Spanish for "World Wrestling Council") and took place at Arena México in Mexico City, Mexico. The special edition of CMLL's Super Viernes show honored CMLL wrestler Blue Panther for his 40th anniversary as a professional wrestler.

As part of the show Blue Panther himself helped book two of the matches on the show. Firstly a match between wrestlers who was trained in the Laguneros area (Blue Panther, Euforia, Black Warrior and Panterita del Ring and wrestlers from the Tapatía area (Máscara Año 2000, El Cuatrero, Forastero and Sansón), which was won by Blue Panther. The other featured match was the first-ever Copa Halcón Suriano torneo cibernetico elimination match. The Copa Halcón Suriano was won by Ángel de Oro who was presented with a trophy by Halcón Suriano Jr. who made his first appearance under that name, having previously worked under the name Stukita. In the main event Bárbaro Cavernario and Los Ingobernables (Rush and El Terrible) defeated Carístico, Penta el 0M, David Finlay

== Production ==
=== Background ===
Genaro Vazquez Nevarez, better known under the Ring name Blue Panther, made his professional wrestling debut on October 8, 1978. His first break came working for the Universal Wrestling Association in the early 1980s. In the UWA he won the UWA World Welterweight Championship, and the UWA World Junior Light Heavyweight Championship twice. He later moved on to Consejo Mundial de Lucha Libre (CMLL), the promotion he worked for, for most of his career. In CMLL he became involved in the storyline feud that would not only bring him to national and international attention but also helped cement his reputation as highly talented wrestler, a feud against "Love Machine" Art Barr, The feud spanned two promotions (CMLL and Asistencia Asesoría y Administración), included two high profile Lucha de Apuestas, or bet matches, where Blue Panther won the mask, and then the hair of Barr, as well as a long series of main event matches. In CMLL Blue Panther's won the CMLL World Middleweight Championship, the CMLL World Tag Team Championship with Atlantis, CMLL World Trios Championship twice, and the Mexican National Trios Championship twice. In 2007 he won the mask of Lizmark Jr., but lost his own mask the following year to Villano V. At his 35th Anniversary Show in 2013 Vazquez introduced two of his sons to the wrestling world, Blue Panther Jr. and Black Panther. For the 40th-anniversary show, Vazques was involved in booking two matches for the show, including creating the Copa Halcón Suriano in honor of his wrestling trainer.

=== Storylines ===
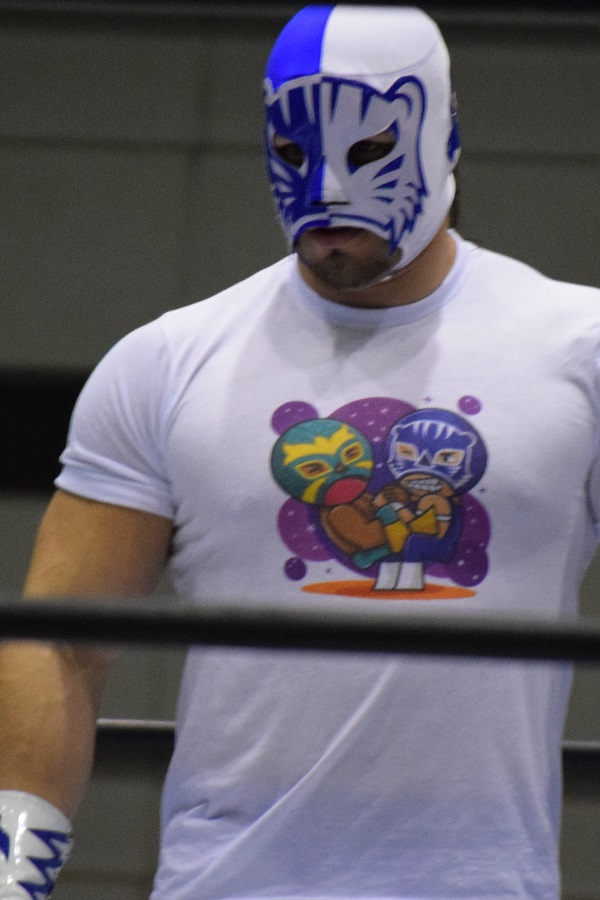
Blue Panther Jr., one of the sons of Blue Panther

The Blue Panther 40th Anniversary Show featured five professional wrestling matches with different wrestlers involved in pre-existing scripted feuds, plots and storylines. Wrestlers were portrayed as either heels (referred to as rudos in Mexico, those that portray the "bad guys") or faces (técnicos in Mexico, the "good guy" characters) as they followed a series of tension-building events, which culminated in a wrestling match or series of matches.

As part of the celebration, Blue Panther wanted to honor his trainer Halcón Suriano, who had had a hand in training many of the wrestlers from the Lagunero area. To that end, CMLL created the La Copa Halcón Suriano, a 10-man tournament where all the competitors came from the Lagunero area. As part of the celebration, CMLL announced that Stukita, the grandson of Halcón Suriano would from that point on be known as "Halcón Suriano Jr." and move from the Mini-Estrella to the regular division. Halcón Suriano Jr. would also present the trophy bearing the name of his grandfather. Soberano Jr. was originally scheduled to be part of the match, but since he was committed to working in Japan at the time he was replaced by Templario. While Templario was not actually from the Lagunero area his trainer Último Guerrero explained that he had become "adopted" by the Laguneros, which was a storyline explanation to cover for the fact that CMLL needed a replacement for Sobereano Jr.

== Event ==
In the opening match, Pegasso was the first of many wrestlers to wear a Blue Panther inspired mask and ring gear specifically for the occasion. Pegasso and Stigma defeated Cancerbero and El Coyote, two falls to one in 9 minutes and 57 seconds.

For the Copa Halcón Suriano introduction ceremony, the five tecnico participants (Ángel de Oro, Black Panther, Blue Panther Jr., Niebla Roja and Stuka Jr.) all wore masks where one side was their normal mask and the other was a replica of the Blue Panther mask. In respect rudo competitor Luciferno also wore blue and black instead of his customary red and black. During the 10-man torneo cibernetico elimination match, Blue Panther Jr. injured himself while slipping during a dive out of the ring to the floor. He was counted out due to the injury and removed from the ring by the ringside attendants. In the end Ángel de Oro pinned Dragón Rojo Jr. to win the tournament.

La Copa Halcón Suriano order of elimination

#	Eliminated	Eliminated by	Time
1	Espanto Jr.	Blue Panther Jr.	05:28
2	Black Panther	Misterioso Jr.	05:29
3	Luciferno	Stuka Jr.	09:18
4	Blue Panther Jr.	Injury	10:05
5	Misterioso Jr.	Niebla Roja	14:16
6	Stuka Jr.	Dragón Rojo Jr.	14:51
7	Templario	Ángel de Oro	16:05
8	Niebla Roja	Dragón Rojo Jr.	19:31
9	Dragón Rojo Jr.	Ángel de Oro	24:57
10	Winner	Ángel de Oro	24:57

Prior to the fourth match of the night Sofia Alonso, granddaughter of CMLL founder Salvador Lutteroth, presented Blue Panther with a plaque commemorating his 40th anniversary in professional wrestling. Afterward, Panther introduced "El Hijo de Blue Panther" (Literally "The Son of Blue Panther"), younger brother of Blue Panther Jr. and Black Panther, to the audience, revealing that Hijo de Blue Panther was preparing for an in-ring career. For the match, both Blue Panther and Máscara Año 2000 wore their wrestling masks, getting special permission from the lucha libre commission to wear their masks after losing them in 2008 and 1993 respectively. For the night Ephesto worked under his previous ring character "Panterita del Ring" as an homage to his Lagunero beginnings. In the end, Blue Panther forced Máscara Año 2000 to submit to an arm bar, winning the match for the "Laguneros'" team two falls to one.

In the main event, the Los Ingobernables team of Bárbaro Cavernario, El Terrible and Rush defeated the trio of Carístico, David Finlay and Penta 0M two falls to one after Rush pinned Penta 0M after executing a "Rush Driver" (Double underhook piledriver) on Penta 0M.

== Matches ==
No.	Results	Stipulations	Times
1	Pegasso and Stigma defeated Cancerbero and El Coyote	Best two-out-of-three falls tag team match	09:52
2	Diamante Azul, Místico and Valiente defeated Dark Magic and La Peste Negra (Negro Casas and El Felino)	Six-man "Lucha Libre rules" tag team match	09:06
3	Ángel de Oro defeated Blue Panther Jr., Black Panther, Niebla Roja and Stuka Jr., Dragón Rojo Jr., Espanto Jr., Luciferno, Misterioso Jr. and Templario	Copa Halcón Suriano torneo cibernetico elimination match	24:57
4	Los Laguneros (Blue Panther, Euforia, Black Warrior and Panterita del Ring) defeated Los Tapatía (Máscara Año 2000, El Cuatrero, Forastero and Sansón)	Best two-out-of-three falls Atómicos match	14:30
5	Bárbaro Cavernario and Los Ingobernables (Rush and El Terrible) defeated Carístico, Penta el 0M, and David Finlay	Six-man "Lucha Libre rules" tag team match	13:24
