= Blue Panther =

Mexican professional wrestler (born 1960)

- Blue Panther in 2025

Personal information
- Born: Genaro Vázquez Nevarez; September 18, 1960 (age 66) Gómez Palacio, Durango, Mexico
- Children: Blue Panther Jr. (son); Black Panther (son); El Hijo de Blue Panther (son)

Professional wrestling career
- Ring name: Blue Panther
- Billed height: 1.68 m (5 ft 6 in)
- Billed weight: 98 kg (216 lb)
- Billed from: Gómez Palacio, Durango
- Trained by: Héctor López; Halcón Suriano
- Debut: October 8, 1978

Genaro Vázquez Nevarez (born September 18, 1960) is a Mexican professional wrestler and trainer, best known under his ring name Blue Panther. He made his in-ring debut in 1978. Since then, he has worked for most major Mexican professional wrestling promotions, including the Universal Wrestling Association (UWA), Consejo Mundial de Lucha Libre (CMLL) and Asistencia, Asesoría y Administración (AAA). He was one of the first wrestlers to leave CMLL for AAA when it was created in 1992, but returned to CMLL in 1997, where he has competed ever since.

Vázquez's two oldest sons, known as Blue Panther Jr. and Black Panther, are also professional wrestlers, working for CMLL since 2013. A third son referred to as El Hijo de Blue Panther also wrestles. He was the first CMLL World Middleweight Champion and has won the Mexican National Middleweight Championship twice, the CMLL World Trios Championship twice, and the Mexican National Trios Championship. He also won the 1999 Torneo Gran Alternativa and the 2000 Leyenda de Plata tournaments. Blue Panther has also wrestled in the United States for Major League Wrestling (MLW), where he won the MLW National Openweight Championship, and Ring of Honor (ROH).

In his career, he has won the masks of such notable wrestlers as Black Man, Lizmark Jr. and Love Machine. In 2008, he lost his own mask to Villano V, and has since had his hair shaved off as a result of losses to Averno and Sam Adonis. Vázquez opened his own gym in the early 1990s, where he was one of the first Mexican professional wrestling trainers to train both men and women.

== Professional wrestling career ==
=== Early career (1978–1981) ===
Blue Panther began wrestling in northern Mexico in the late 1970s before getting noticed by wrestler and promoter René Guajardo in Monterrey. During his initial years in Monterrey, he was given several opportunities to show off his in-ring skills and work higher profile matches, in particular with Lucha de Apuestas ("bet match") wins, where he defeated and unmasked La Bestia, Simio Blanco and Oro. (Note: Finals of a losers advance tournament.) (Note: Blue Panther 30 Años (2008) p. 28 Las Máscaras y Cabelleras: Oro")

=== Universal Wrestling Association (1981–1990) ===
Guarjardo got Blue Panther booked in the Universal Wrestling Association (UWA), and in 1981, he made his debut in their main venue, the El Toreo de Cuatro Caminos bullfighting arena in Naucalpan. After wrestling on the undercard as a rudo (also referred to as a "heel", those that portray the "bad guys" in wrestling), he received his first push in 1984, winning the UWA World Welterweight Championship from veteran worker Matemático. Panther also began teaming with Black Man on a regular basis around that time, including a November 20 Lucha de Apuestas win over Los Sombras de Plata, forcing both members of the team to unmask. The team later broke up, leading to a prolonged storyline feud between the two, which included Black Man winning the UWA World Welterweight Championship from Blue Panther on February 9, 1986. The storyline built to a high-profile Lucha de Apuestas between the two at the El Toreon Cuatro Caminos. After three long falls, Blue Panther defeated Black Man, forcing him to unmask and state his real name, per lucha libre traditions.

On November 16, Blue Panther defeated Gran Hamada to win his first UWA World Junior Light Heavyweight Championship. His first reign, which lasted 190 days, was ended by El Solar on May 25, 1987. He later regained the championship on February 8, 1988. In May, Blue Panther won another significant match, unmasking Kendo in Tijuana, Baja California. On September 18, Blue Panther's second and final reign as the UWA World Junior Light Heavyweight Champion ended as the UWA bookers decided to have Gran Cochisse win the championship from him.

=== Consejo Mundial de Lucha Libre (1991–1992) ===
In 1991, Panther began working full-time for Empresa Mexicana de Lucha Libre (EMLL) as a top rudo. He began a feud with Atlantis over the NWA World Middleweight Championship, but was unsuccessful in his August title challenge. (Note: Blue Panther 30 Años (2008) p. 14 "Empresa Mexicana de Lucha Libre") Later that year, EMLL changed their name to Consejo Mundial de Lucha Libre (CMLL; "World Wrestling Council") and held tournaments for CMLL-branded championships. Blue Panther was one of sixteen competitors entered in the tournament for the CMLL World Middleweight Championship, defeating Ringo Mendoza in the opening round, El Dandy in the semi-finals and El Satánico in the finals to become the inaugural champion.

Following his victory, Blue Panther was programmed in a feud with American Love Machine, elevating his status as one of the top stars of lucha libre at the time. The storyline built to the main event of 36. Aniversario de Arena México on April 3, 1992, at Arena México, where the event drew a sold-out crowd of 18,000, prompting CMLL to use closed-circuit screens for an additional 8,000 spectators. In the third and deciding fall, Love Machine used a move called El Martinete' (a "piledriver") which, under lucha libre rules, caused him to be disqualified and lose the match; per storyline, Love Machine was not aware of the specific rule, unique to Mexico, and thus was "robbed" of the victory. After the loss, Love Machine reluctantly unmasked and revealed his real name, Art Barr. (Note: Blue Panther 30 Años (2008) p. 16 "Contra Love Machine Art Barr")

=== Asistencia, Asesoría y Administración (1992–1997) ===
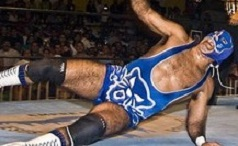
Blue Panther wearing his signature mask.

In mid-1992, then-CMLL-booker Antonio Peña left CMLL over creative differences with the owner and formed his own company, Asistencia, Asesoría y Administración (AAA). (Note: Blue Panther 30 Años (2008) p. 17 "Triple A") Panther, who was close to Peña, left CMLL to join AAA, resulting in the CMLL World Middleweight Championship being declared vacant. On July 23, Blue Panther won the Mexican National Middleweight Championship from Octagón, holding the title for 665 days until Octagón regained the championship on April 30, 1994. In July 1993, Blue Panther faced Love Machine, who joined AAA months after him, in a mask vs. hair match, during which both wrestlers changed sides. Love Machine was helped by Eddy Guerrero, turning rudo, while Blue Panther became a tecnico (a "face", those that portray the "good guys" in wrestling) as he "valiantly" fought back and defeated Love Machine. (Note: Blue Panther 30 Años (2008) p. 29 Las Máscaras y Cabelleras: Love Machine (Art Barr)") Afterwards, Barr and Guerrero formed Los Gringos Locos,'which soon became the main rudo group of AAA.

Blue Panther's second reign as Mexican National Middleweight Champion lasted a total of 609 days, from May 27, 1994 to January 26, 1996, when El Hijo del Santo won the championship. On November 6, 1994, Blue Panther, Jerry Estrada and La Parka lost to 2 Cold Scorpio, Chris Benoit and Tito Santana at AAA When Worlds Collide. On July 6, 1995, Panther, Fuerza Guerrera and Psicosis defeated Octagón, Rey Misterio Jr. and Super Muñeco to win the Mexican National Trios Championship. After the downturn of the Mexican economy, Blue Panther and Guerrera started their own promotion called Promotora Mexicana de Lucha Libre (PROMELL; later known as Promo Azteca). The Mexico City Boxing and Professional wrestling commission took control of the Mexican National Trios Championship away from AAA and awarded it to PROMELL instead, leading to the championship being vacated in 1996, before Panther won it again with Guerrera and El Signo by defeating El Brazo, Súper Brazo and Super Elektra. As the original PROMELL struggled to be profitable, Blue Panther briefly returned to AAA in 1997.

=== Return to CMLL (1997–present) ===
In 1998, Panther teamed with Dr. Wagner Jr. and his real-life nephew Black Warrior to form "Los Laguneros", defeating Bestia Salvaje, Scorpio Jr. and Zumbido in a tournament final on December 18 to win the vacant CMLL World Trios Championship. In April 1999, Panther and Último Guerrero won that year's Torneo Gran Alternativa ("Great Alternative Tournament"). The trios championship was vacated in 2002 after Black Warrior left Los Laguneros. Guerrera replaced Black Warrior on the team, which won another tournament for it; they reigned for only three months before dropping the titles to Black Warrior, Atlantis and Mr. Niebla. Blue Panther soon transitioned into a técnico and began teaming with Atlantis, Lizmark Jr. and Mr. Niebla as La Ola Azul ("The Blue Wave"), feuding with Los Guerreros del Infierno. In 2004, Atlantis and Blue Panther defeated Guerrero and Rey Bucanero to win the CMLL World Tag Team Championship, which they held until losing it to Averno and Mephisto in April 2005. When Atlantis turned rudo, Panther feuded with him intermittently, and the two often ripped at each other's masks, hinting at a possible mask vs. mask match. At the CMLL 75th Anniversary Show on September 19, 2008, Blue Panther lost his mask to Villano V, thus forcing him to state his birth name, Genaro Vázquez Nevarez.

In late 2011, Blue Panther began feuding with La Peste Negra ("The Black Plague"; Negro Casas and El Felino), leading to a hair vs. hair match between him and El Felino in the main event of Sin Piedad ("No Mercy") on December 16. A week prior to the match, Panther was disqualified in a tag team match after giving El Felino a piledriver. This led to the Distrito Federal Box y Lucha Commission announcing that Panther was suspended for two weeks, starting after the event, where El Felino was disqualified after the referee caught him going for a piledriver; as a result, El Felino was shaved bald. On March 2, 2012, at Homenaje a Dos Leyendas ("Homage to Two Legends"), Panther and Casas wrestled to a draw in a Lucha de Apuestas and were both shaved bald. In March 2013, Blue Panther was forced to team up with rudo Rey Escorpión in the 2013 Torneo Nacional de Parejas Increibles ("National Incredible Pairs Tournament"), a tournament where a rudo and tecnico team up. The two defeated Delta and Tiger in the first round, but lost to Dragón Rojo Jr. and Niebla Roja in the quarter-finals. On September 13, at the CMLL 80th Anniversary Show, Blue Panther lost his hair to Averno in a submissions-only Lucha de Apuestas.

==== Second generation Panthers (2013–present) ====
In late 2013, Blue Panther's two oldest sons made their CMLL debuts, using the ring names Black Panther and Cachorro ("Cub") and wearing a variation of their father's mask; they would later be renamed "Blue Panther Jr." and "The Panther" respectively. They became a regular trio collectively referred to as Los Divinos Laguneros ("The Divine Laguneros"). Blue Panther and The Panther teamed for the Torneo Gran Alternativa on January 31, 2014, defeating Averno and El Rebelde in the opening round, before losing to La Sombra and Oro Jr. in the second round. In mid-2017, Blue Panther became involved in a long-running storyline with American wrestler Sam Adonis, who portrayed a pro-Donald Trump and anti-Mexican ring character. Panther stood up to Adonis and defended Mexico as the two fought in a high-profile Lucha de Apuestas on August 4, which Adonis won, forcing Blue Panther to have his hair shaved off. Blue Panther and Blue Panther Jr. participated in a tournament for the vacant CMLL World Tag Team Championship on March 9, but lost in the first round to Diamante Azul and Stuka Jr.

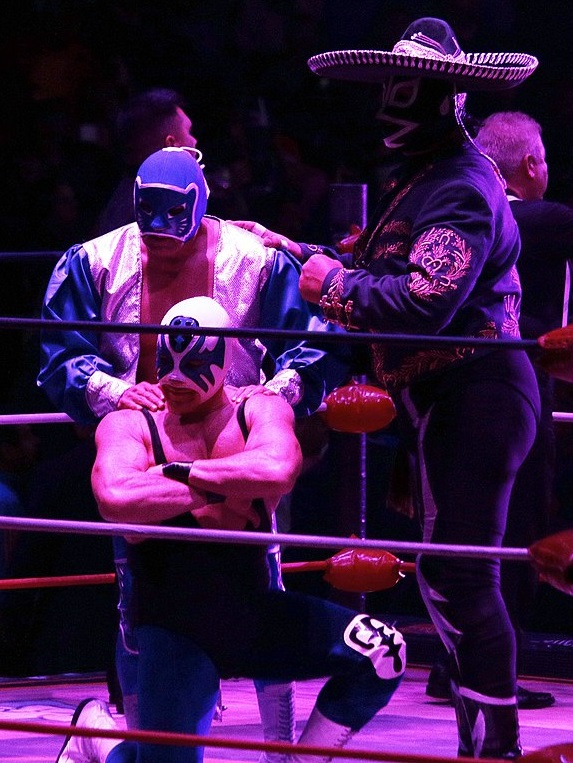
Blue Panther (left) during his 40th Anniversary celebration in October 2018 with Atlantis (kneeling) and Rayo de Jalisco Jr. (right).

In mid-2018, Vázquez announced that a third son was training for an in-ring career, introducing him as "El Hijo de Blue Panther" ("The Son of Blue Panther"). In subsequent months, The Panther changed his name to his older brother's previous one, "Black Panther". On October 19, CMLL celebrated Vázquez's career as they held the Blue Panther 40th Anniversary Show, with Panther teaming up with fellow Lagunero wrestlers Euforia, Black Warrior and Panterita del Ring to defeat Los Tapatía (Máscara Año 2000, El Cuatrero, Forastero and Sansón). On January 31, 2019, Blue Panther and Black Panther wrestled at International Wrestling Revolution Group (IWRG)'s Guerra de Dinastías ("War of the Dynasties") event, where they lost to the father/son team of El Solar and El Hijo del Solar. In April 2020, Blue Panther's third son was introduced to the wrestling world, known under the ring name "Chachorro Lagunero" ("The Lagunero Puppy").

At the CMLL 90th Anniversary Show on September 16, 2023, Blue Panther, Atlantis and Octagón defeated El Satánico, Fuerza Guerrera and Virus. On October 20, CMLL held the Blue Panther 45th Anniversary Show, where he, Blue Panther Jr., Dark Panther and El Hijo de Blue Panther (the former Chachorro Lagunero) defeated Los Guerreros Laguneros (Gran Guerrero, Stuka Jr. and Último Guerrero) and Hijo del Stuka Jr. On June 15, 2025, he and El Hijo de Blue Panther lost to Atlantis and Atlantis Jr. in the finals of the Copa Diniastias ("Dynasties Cup") tournament. At Homenaje a Dos Leyendas on March 20, 2026, Blue Panther was involved in El Satánico's retirement match, a three-way elimination match, where he was the second wrestler eliminated by Satánico. On August 18, he and Atlantis unsuccessfully challenged Los Hermanos Chávez (Ángel de Oro and Niebla Roja) for the CMLL World Tag Team Championship. The following month, he accepted Jeff Jarrett's challenge to a match at the CMLL 93rd Anniversary Show on September 18, which Blue Panther won.

=== Major League Wrestling (2025–present) ===
On November 18, 2024, Major League Wrestling (MLW) announced that Blue Panther would debut at Kings of Colosseum on January 11, 2025, where he and Dark Panther lost to Atlantis and Atlantis Jr. At Battle Riot VII on April 5, he participated in the 40-man Battle Riot for the MLW World Heavyweight Championship, but was eliminated by Hechicero. On September 21, Blue Panther defeated Último Guerrero to win the MLW National Openweight Championship. He successfully defended the title against Atlantis and Rugido in a three-way match on October 25 at Symphony of Horrors, but lost it to Austin Aries on February 7, 2026, during an MLW Fusion taping.

=== Ring of Honor (2025) ===
Blue Panther made his debut for Ring of Honor (ROH) on February 26, 2025, teaming with Blue Panther Jr. and Dark Panther to defeat Euforia, Gran Guerrero and Valiente in a match that aired on the March 6 episode of Ring of Honor Wrestling. At Global Wars Mexico on June 26, Blue Panther defeated ROH Pure Champion Lee Moriarty in a non-title match. At Supercard of Honor on July 11, he unsuccessfully challenged Moriarty for the title. After the match, Blue Panther and Moriarty shook hands.

== Professional wrestling trainer ==
Vazquez opened his own gym in the early 1990s and began training prospective professional wrestlers, being one of the first maestros to train both men and women at his gym. Over the years, he has played a part in training hundreds of wrestlers for their in-ring career. (Note: Blue Panther 30 Años (2008) p. 31 Maestro Lagunero")

- Black Fish (Note: Son of Fishman.)
- Black Panther
- Blue Panther Jr.
- Cynthia Moreno
- El Oriental
- Ephesto
- Esther Moreno
- Morphosis/Histeria
- Texano Jr.
- Veneno
- Xochitl Hamada

== Professional wrestling style ==
Over the years, Vázquez has become known for his "Ras de Lona" ("On the mat") wrestling style, focusing more on holds, takedowns and submission moves than high flying wrestling. The style is personified by his Nudo Lagunero ("The Lagunero Knot") submission move that he created. The "Nudo Lagunero" is a standing figure-four leglock, where Vázquez first wraps a prone opponent's legs across each other, then stretches the opponent's arms through the "knot" of the legs and pulls them up in the air so that all pressure is on the arms to force a submission. In addition to the more complicated Nudo, he also uses the Fujiwara armbar submission hold, where Vázquez takes a face-down opponent's arm and pulls it back while laying on their back to put the pressure on the shoulder and elbow joints. While he is mostly known for his mat style, he will, on occasion, execute a dive out of the ring, such as a Topé Suicida, where he dives head first through the ropes to hit an opponent.

== Personal life ==
Genaro Vázquez Nevarez was born on September 18, 1960, in the "Lagunero" town in Gómez Palacio, Durango, Mexico. His oldest son was born in the mid-to-late 1980s, known professionally as "Blue Panther Jr.". His second son, known under the ring name "Black Panther", was born in either 1988 or 1989. A third son was introduced in mid-2018 under the ring name "El Hijo de Blue Panther". Vázquez is the uncle of Jesus Toral Lopez, better known as the professional wrestler Black Warrior, and the great-uncle of Toral's son Warrior Jr. Vázquez owns and operates his own chiropractic clinic, where he has treated several of his fellow wrestlers, as well as patients in general.

== Championships and accomplishments ==
- Asistencia Asesoría y Administración / AAA
  - Mexican National Middleweight Championship (2 times)
- Consejo Mundial de Lucha Libre
  - CMLL World Middleweight Championship (1 time)
  - CMLL World Tag Team Championship (1 time) – with Atlantis
  - CMLL World Trios Championship (2 times) – with Black Warrior and Dr. Wagner Jr. (1), Dr. Wagner Jr. and Fuerza Guerrera (1)
  - Mexican National Trios Championship (2 times) – with Fuerza Guerrera and Psicosis (1), Fuerza Guerrera and El Signo (1)
  - Torneo Gran Alternativa: 1999 – with Último Guerrero
  - Leyenda de Azul: 2000

- Copa Bobby Bonales: 2009
- La Copa Diablo Velazco (2008)
- Torneo Cibernetico De Leyendas CMLL (2023)

- Major League Wrestling
  - MLW National Openweight Championship (1 time)
- Pro Wrestling Illustrated
  - PWI ranked him 56 of the 500 best singles wrestlers of the PWI 500 in 1998
- Universal Wrestling Association
  - UWA World Junior Light Heavyweight Championship (2 times)
  - UWA World Welterweight Championship (1 time)
- World Wrestling Association
  - WWA Middleweight Championship (1 time)
  - WWA World Welterweight Championship (1 time)
- Wrestling Observer Newsletter
  - Wrestling Observer Newsletter Hall of Fame (2023)

== Luchas de Apuestas record ==
Winner (wager)	Loser (wager)	Location	Event	Date	Notes
Blue Panther and Matemático (masks)	La Bestia and Simio Blanco (masks)	Monterrey, Nuevo León	Live event	February 28, 1979	(Note: Blue Panther 30 Años (2008) p. 28 Las Máscaras y Cabelleras: La Bestia y Simio Blanco")
Blue Panther (mask)	Oro (Note: Not the more well known Oro who worked in the late 1980s-early 1990s.) (mask)	Monterrey, Nuevo León	Live event	1980	
Blue Panther (mask)	Gorila Infernal (mask)	Xalapa, Veracruz	UWA show	February 23, 1984	(Note: Blue Panther 30 Años (2008) p. 28 Las Máscaras y Cabelleras: Gorilla Infernal")
Blue Panther (mask)	El Brillante (hair)	Querétaro, Querétaro	UWA show	June 24, 1984	(Note: Blue Panther 30 Años (2008) p. 28 Las Máscaras y Cabelleras: El Brillante")
Blue Panther (mask)	Bull Power (mask)	Puebla, Puebla	UWA show	September 7, 1984	(Note: Blue Panther 30 Años (2008) p. 28 Las Máscaras y Cabelleras: Bull Power")
Blue Panther (mask)	Luzbel (mask)	Tuxtla Gutiérrez, Chiapas	UWA show	October 18, 1984	(Note: Blue Panther 30 Años (2008) p. 28 Las Máscaras y Cabelleras: Luzbel")
Blue Panther and Black Man (masks)	Los Sombras de Plata (masks) (Sombra de Plata I and II)	Naucalpan, State of Mexico	UWA show	November 20, 1984	(Note: Blue Panther 30 Años (2008) p. 28 Las Máscaras y Cabelleras: Los Sombras de Plata")
Blue Panther (mask)	Black Man (mask)	Naucalpan, State of Mexico	UWA show	February 16, 1986	(Note: Blue Panther 30 Años (2008) p. 28 Las Máscaras y Cabelleras: Black Man")
Blue Panther (mask)	El Avispón Negro (mask)	Naucalpan, State of Mexico	UWA show	March 16, 1986	(Note: Blue Panther 30 Años (2008) p. 28 Las Máscaras y Cabelleras: El Avispón Negro")
Blue Panther (mask)	Kendo (mask)	Tijuana, Baja California	UWA show	May 1988	(Note: Blue Panther 30 Años (2008) p. 28 Las Máscaras y Cabelleras: Kendo")
Blue Panther (mask)	Love Machine (mask)	Mexico City	36. Aniversario de Arena México	April 3, 1992	
Blue Panther (mask)	Vulcano (hair)	Mexico City	AAA Sin Limite	April 9, 1993	(Note: Blue Panther 30 Años (2008) p. 29 Las Máscaras y Cabelleras: Vulcano")
Blue Panther (mask)	Love Machine (hair)	Tonalá, Jalisco	AAA Sin Limite	July 7, 1993	(Note: Blue Panther 30 Años (2008) p. 29 Las Máscaras y Cabelleras: Love Machine (Art Barr)")
Blue Panther (mask)	El Nuevo Huracán Ramírez Jr. (mask)	Cuernavaca, Morelos	CMLL show	February 3, 2000	(Note: Blue Panther 30 Años (2008) p. 29 Las Máscaras y Cabelleras: El Nuevo Huracán Ramírez Jr.") (Note: This was a Relevos suicidas match against El Hijo del Santo and Fuerza Guerrera, Blue Panther El Nuevo Huracán Ramírez Jr. lost the match and was forced to wrestle each other.)
Blue Panther (mask)	Lizmark Jr. (mask)	Mexico City	CMLL 74th Anniversary Show	September 28, 2007	(Note: Blue Panther 30 Años (2008) p. 29 Las Máscaras y Cabelleras: Lizmark Jr.") (Note: match included Perro Aguayo Jr., Atlantis, Último Guerrero, Místico, Villano V and Dr. Wagner Jr.)
Blue Panther (mask)	Tigre Universitario (mask)	Monterrey, Nuevo León	CMLL show	July 5, 2008	
Villano V (mask)	Blue Panther (mask)	Mexico City	CMLL 75th Anniversary Show	September 19, 2008	
Blue Panther (hair)	Diluvio Negro II (hair)	Monterrey, Nuevo León	Live event	December 18, 2008	(Note: Three-way match that also involved Tigre Universitario.)
Blue Panther(hair)	El Felino (hair)	Mexico City	Sin Piedad	December 16, 2011	
Draw	Blue Panther (hair); Negro Casas (hair)	Mexico City	Homenaje a Dos Leyendas	March 2, 2012	(Note: The match ended in a draw.)
Averno (hair)	Blue Panther (hair)	Mexico City	CMLL 80th Anniversary Show	September 13, 2013	
Sam Adonis (hair)	Blue Panther (hair)	Mexico City	CMLL Super Viernes	August 4, 2017	
