= Fuerza Guerrera =

Mexican Luchador enmascarado (born 1953)

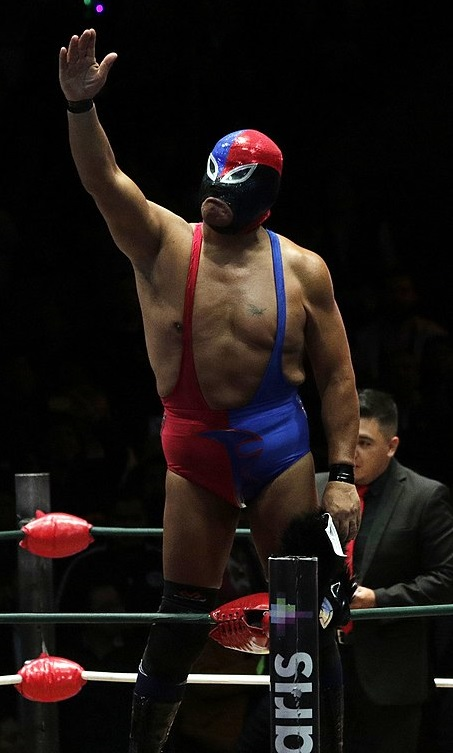
- Fuerza Guerrera in 2018

Personal information
- Born: December 13, 1953 (age 72) Mexico City, Mexico
- Family: Juventud Guerrera (son)

Professional wrestling career
- Ring names: Cachorro Gonzalez; Fuerza Guerrera
- Billed height: 1.70 m (5 ft 7 in)
- Billed weight: 82 kg (181 lb)
- Billed from: Mexico City, Distrito Federal
- Trained by: Dick Angelo; Ángel Blanco; Gallo Tapado; Raul Reyes
- Debut: 1977

Fuerza Guerrera (Note: Spanish for "Warrior Strength". Not to be mistaken for the surname Guerrero.) (born December 13, 1953) is the ring name of a Mexican professional wrestler. Throughout his career, Guerrera has worked for every major professional wrestling promotion in Mexico including Consejo Mundial de Lucha Libre (CMLL), Lucha Libre AAA World Wide (AAA), the Universal Wrestling Association (UWA), the World Wrestling Association (WWA), and the International Wrestling Revolution Group (IWRG), holding championships including the CMLL World Trios Championship, CMLL World Welterweight Championship, Mexican National Lightweight Championship, Mexican National Middleweight Championship, Mexican National Tag Team Championship, Mexican National Trios Championship, Mexican National Welterweight Championship, and NWA World Welterweight Championship. His son, Juventud Guerrera, is also a professional wrestler.

== Professional wrestling career ==
=== Early eareer (1977–1981) ===
The wrestler who would become known as Fuerza Guerrera trained for his professional wrestling career under Dick Angelo, he would later receive further training from Gallo Tapado, Raul Reyes, El Solar, El Espectro and Ángel Blanco. He made his professional wrestling debut in 1977 under the ring name Cachorro González (Spanish for "Cub González"). in his debut match he faced, and lost to, Rokambole (later Villano V) and Leopardo Negro (Villano IV) in San Pedro, Puebla. After wrestling as Chachorro González for over a year González wanted to adopt an enmascarado character by the name of "Star Wars", but the local promoter, Señor Barradas, did not want wrestlers with English names. Instead he adopted the name "Fuerza Guerrera", a name he came up with inspired by the Aztec warriors of Latin America. Fuerza Guerrera also adopted a black mask with red and blue markings – red representing passion and blue representing peace, a mask that quickly became his trademark. He made his in-ring debut as Fuerza Guerrera on December 19, 1979, in Arena Naucalpan. Since his debut Guerrera has almost always worked as a Rudo, a "bad guy" or "Heel" character, a choice he took early on as it fit with both his personality and his wrestling style.

=== Empresa Mexicana de Lucha Libre (1981–1992) ===
The combination of Guerrera's in-ring skills, natural charisma and unique mask quickly landed him a regular job working for Empresa Mexicana de Lucha Libre (EMLL), Mexico's largest wrestling promotion. On September 25, 1981, Fuerza Guerrera made his first appearance at a major EMLL show as he wrestled and defeated Negro Casas on EMLL's 48th Anniversary show. On November 6, 1983, Guerrera defeated Aguila Venezolana in a tournament final to win the vacant Mexican National Lightweight Championship, the first professional wrestling championships of his career. In May, 1984 Guerrera vacated the title when he moved from the lightweight weight class (between 63 kg (139 lb) and 70 kg (150 lb)) and into the Welterweight weight class (between 70 kg (150 lb) and 78 kg (172 lb)). On December 3, 1985, Fuerza Guerrera captured the Mexican National Welterweight Championship when he defeated Javier Cruz. Guerrera held the title for approximately 240 days before vacating the title as he left EMLL to work for other wrestling promotions in Mexico. By late 1988 Guerrera had returned to EMLL and captured the NWA World Welterweight Championship on October 4, 1988, when he defeated Solar II and won the highest ranking title in the Welterweight division at the time. Guerrera would go on to make several successful title defenses until he lost to Águila Solitaria on June 2, 1980. Guerrera regained the title three days later and went on to have an 808-day reign that included successful title defenses against Pantera II, Americo Rocca, his trainer Gallo Tapado, Misterioso and Octagón. In 1989 Guerrera also began working part-time in the Tijuana, Baja California based World Wrestling Association promotion, winning the WWA Welterweight Championship twice in 1989 and 1990.

During his title reign Fuerza Guerrera began a long running storyline feud that quickly drew big crowds as the two talented young wrestlers worked a series of very highly thought off matches. On December 14, 1990, Fuerza Guerrera and Octagón were involved in a three-way Luchas de Apuesta ("bet match"), round robin tournament along with Huracán Ramírez where their masks were on the line. In the end Guerrera managed to defeat both Octagón and Ramírez, forcing the two to face off with their mask on the line. Guerrera sat on the sideline and watched Octagón defeat Ramírez and unmask him after the match per Lucha Libre traditions. On December 15, 1991, Guerrera and Octagón were once again involved in an Apuesta match where each could potentially lose their mask. The two teamed up to take on El Hijo del Santo and Black Shadow, Jr. in a Relevos suicida match, where the losing team is forced to wrestle each other with their mask on the line. Fuerza Guerrera pinned El Hijo del Santo to keep both his and Octagón's mask safe, while Hijo del Santo would go on to unmask Black Shadow, Jr. On February 15, 1992, Fuerza Guerrera became the first ever CMLL World Welterweight Champion when he defeated El Khalifa in the finals of a 4-man tournament. Guerrera only held the title for 22 days before losing it to America.

=== Asistencia Asesoría y Administración / AAA (1992–2007) ===
In mid 1992 CMLL head booker Antonio Peña decided to break away from the promotion and start on his own, founding a company called Asistencia Asesoría y Administración, later known simply as AAA. When Peña left CMLL a lot of wrestlers, especially younger wrestlers and lower weight division wrestlers, left with him to AAA, among those to leave was Fuerza Guerrera and his rival Octagón who moved to AAA to continue their feud. One of Peña's creations was the annual Triplemanía event, starting with Triplemanía I on March 30, 1993, where Fuerza Guerrera teamed with Heavy Metal and Rambo in a loss to Octagón, El Hijo del Santo and Villano III.

In the months following Triplemanía I Fuerza's son, working under the name Juventud Guerrera, made his debut in AAA and began teaming with his father on a regular basis. On November 6, 1994, Fuerza Guerrera teamed with Madonna's Boyfriend, and Psicosis to defeat Rey Mysterio, Jr., Heavy Metal, and Latin Lover on the undercard of AAA's first ever Pay-Per-View AAA When Worlds Collide. On December 2, 1994, Fuerza and Juventud Guerrera defeated Heavy Metal and Latin Lover to win the Mexican National Tag Team Championship, a title the team held for 181 days before losing the belts to Latin Lover and Panterita del Ring. The father-son team would also win the WWA Tag Team Championship (Note: While the World Wrestling Association was not affiliated with AAA they allowed their titles to be defended on AAA shows.) Los Guerreras also teamed with Psicosos to win the WWA Trios Championship from El Hijo del Santo, Octagón and Rey Misterio, Jr. Fuerza Guerrera would also briefly hold the IWC World Middleweight Championship. In late 1995 AAA and Promo Azteca who had been co-promoting shows for about a year split up and Juventud Guerrera left AAA for Promo Azteca. Following his departure Los Guerreras were stripped of the National tag Team titles On September 6, 1996, Fuerza, Blue Panther and El Signo won the Mexican National Trios Championship, a title that would soon after become inactive as the three began working for different promotions.

In 1997 Fuerza Guerrera teamed with Jerry Estrada and Heavy Metal, losing to Héctor Garza, Perro Aguayo and El Canek at the World Wrestling Federations (WWF) 1997 Royal Rumble event, a match that came about due to the AAA/WWF working relationship at the time. This was Guerrera's only WWF appearance. On May 15, 1997, Fuerza Guerrera teamed with Mosco de la Merced to win the Mexican National Tag Team title for a third time. A couple of months later the original Mosco de la Merced left AAA and was quietly replaced by Mosco de la Merced II who took both the original wrestlers bookings and his half of the Mexican tag team title. The team held the tag team titles until losing to the father/son team of Perro Aguayo and Perro Aguayo, Jr. on June 7, 1998.

In 2001 Fuerza Guerrera made his return to CMLL, initially to team with Blue Panther and El Signo to lose the Mexican National Trios title to Mr. Niebla, Olímpico and Safari, handing the titles over to CMLL. In 2002 Guerrera, Blue Panther and Dr. Wagner, Jr. had a brief run with the CMLL World Trios Championship as they won the title by defeating Black Warrior, Mr. Niebla and Antifaz del Norte and held them for 91 days before losing the belts to Atlantis, Black Warrior and Mr. Niebla.

Following his year long stint in CMLL Fuerza Guerrera returned to AAA. At Triplemanía XIII teamed with Los Hell Brothers (Chessman and Cibernético) in main event, losing to Latin Lover, La Parka and Fuerza's career long rival Octagón. In 2007 became involved in a storyline where he would actually wrestle his own son, Juventud Guerrera for the first time in his career. The two met in a Street Fight at Triplemanía XV which saw Juventud defeat his father. Fuerza wrestled his last major match for AAA when he took part in a joint AAA/Pro Wrestling NOAH show, TripleSEM on September 3, 2007. Fuerza teamed with Antifaz and Histeria, losing to the Mexican Powers (Juventud, Joe Líder and Crazy Boy) in a match that also involved El Elegido, KENTA and Taiji Ishimori.

=== International Wrestling Revolution Group (2008–present) ===
In 2007 Fuerza Guerrera worked his final match for AAA and began working on the independent circuit and making regularly appearances for International Wrestling Revolution Group (IWRG). One of Guerrera's early IWRG appearances was at the 2008 Rey del Ring (Spanish for "King of the Ring") tournament, which was won by Scorpio, Jr. On May 5, 2008, Fuerza Guerrera defeated Multifacético to win the IWRG Intercontinental Welterweight Championship. Besides working for IWRG Fuerza Guerrera also worked on Blue Demon, Jr.'s NWA Mexico debut show, teaming with El Dandy and Hijo del Siltario in a main event loss to Blue Demon, Jr., El Hijo del Santo and Rayo de Jalisco, Jr. On June 7, 2008, Guerrera lost the IWRG Welterweight title to Black Terry only to regain it on November 16, 2008. Guerrera still works for IWRG as well as helping his son build a new wrestling promotion called "Gran Prix Championship Wrestling Super-X" (GPCW). Despite not working for the same promotion both Octagón and Fuerza Guerrera have expressed a desire for a one on one Luchas de Apuesta between the two before either of them retire from wrestling. On May 23, 2010, Guerrera lost the IWRG Intercontinental Welterweight championship to Dr. Cerebro after holding the title for 553 days.

== Personal life ==
Fuerza Guerrera's real name is not a matter of public record, as is often the case with masked wrestlers in Mexico where their private lives are kept a secret from the wrestling fans.

Fuerza Guerrera is the father of professional wrestler Juventud Guerrera. On October 9, 2018, Guerrera presented his other children as professional wrestlers, his son Fuerza Guerrera Jr/El Hijo de Fuerza Guerrera and his daughter Fuerza Guerrera/Hija de Fuerza Guerrera. He is also the uncle of professional wrestler Furia Guerrera, who after a brief stint in AAA in 1998 wrestled in the independent circuit until his murder in August 2009.

== Championships and accomplishments ==
- Asistencia Asesoría y Administración / AAA
  - Mexican National Middleweight Championship (1 time)
  - Mexican National Tag Team Championship (3 times) – with Juventud Guerrera (2), and Mosco de la Merced (I/II)
  - Mexican National Trios Championship (1 time) – with Blue Panther and Psicosis
  - IWC World Middleweight Championship (1 time)
  - Young Stars Tag Team Tournament: 1997 – with Mosco de la Merced
- Empresa Mexicana de Lucha Libre / Consejo Mundial de Lucha Libre
  - CMLL World Trios Championship (1 time) – with Blue Panther and Dr. Wagner, Jr.
  - CMLL World Welterweight Championship (1 time)
  - Mexican National Lightweight Championship (1 time)
  - Mexican National Trios Championship (1 time) – with Blue Panther and El Signo
  - Mexican National Welterweight Championship (1 time)
  - NWA World Welterweight Championship (2 times) (Note: CMLL was a member of the National Wrestling Alliance until the late 1980s but retain the use of some NWA branded titles after leaving the Alliance.)
  - Copa Ovaciones: 2001 – with El Felino
- International Wrestling Revolution Group
  - IWRG Intercontinental Welterweight Championship (2 times)
- Pro Wrestling Illustrated
  - PWI ranked him #96 of the 500 best singles wrestlers of the PWI 500 in 2002
- World Wrestling Association
  - WWA Tag Team Championship (1 time) – with Juventud Guerrera
  - WWA Trios Championship (1 time) – with Juventud Guerrera and Psicosis
  - WWA Welterweight Championship (2 times)

== Luchas de Apuestas record ==
Winner (wager)	Loser (wager)	Location	Event	Date	Notes
Los Bravos (Fuerza Guerrera (mask), El Dandy (hair) and Talisman (hair)	Los Destructores (Lemús II (mask), Tony Arce (hair) and Vulcano (hair))	Mexico City	Live event	July 5, 1985	
Fuerza Guerrera (mask)	Rocky Star (mask)	Mexico City	Juicio Final	December 1, 1989	(Note: Lost a Relevos increíbles to El Hijo del Santo and All Star.)
Fuerza Guerrera (mask)	Gallo Tapado (mask)	Mexico City	Live event	March 8, 1991	
Fuerza Guerrera (mask)	Mike Segura (hair)	Naucalpan, State of Mexico	Live event	November 4, 1999	(Note: Lost a Relevos Suicidas to El Torero and El Matador.)
Fuerza Guerrera (mask)	Justiciero (hair)	Coacalco, State of Mexico	Live event	January 19, 2003	
Fuerza Guerrera (mask and championship)	Black Terry (hair)	Naucalpan, State of Mexico	Live event	November 16, 2008	
