= El Solar =

Mexican professional wrestler

"Solar"
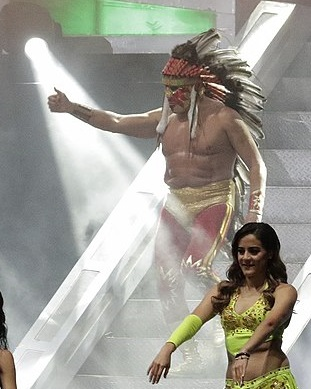
- El Solar making his entrance on November 30, 2018

Personal information
- Born: Anonymus; May 25, 1956 (age 70) Zacoalco de Torres, Jalisco, Mexico
- Family: El Solar II; El Hijo del Solar (Son)
- Website: Official Facebook Page

Professional wrestling career
- Ring name(s): Solar; Solar I El Mariachi
- Billed height: 173 cm (5 ft 8 in)
- Billed weight: 89 kg (196 lb)
- Trained by: Toño Cruz; Los Calaveras (I and II)
- Debut: May, 1975

El Solar (born May 26, 1956 in Zacoalco de Torres, Jalisco, Mexico) is the ring name of a Mexican professional wrestler who has been working since 1975. El Solar's real name is not a matter of public record, as is often the case with masked wrestlers in Mexico where their private lives are kept a secret from the wrestling fans. His brother works as El Solar II and his son has been wrestling as El Hijo del Solar since 2008.

== Professional wrestling career ==
El Solar trained under Toño Cruz and the brother team known as Los Calaveras prior to his in-ring debut in 1975. The masked Solar quickly gained a reputation for being a very talented mat wrestler and was noted for his innovative and complex submission holds that he would employ during matches. Early in his career he worked for Universal Wrestling Association (UWA), one of the two main professional wrestling companies in Mexico at the time. On May 29, 1977 El Solar defeated Villano III to win the UWA World Welterweight Championship, his first professional wrestling championship. During that period of time the UWA teamed El Solar up with Súper Astro and Ultramán to form a very popular high flying trio known as Los Cadetes del Espacio ("The Space Cadets"). On July 16, 1978, 413 days after he won the UWA World Welterweight Championship, El Solar lost the title to Bobby Lee. In 1978 or 1979 El Solar's younger brother made his wrestling debut as "Solar II", wearing almost identical ring gear and mask of his brother, with the debut El Solar often became known as "Solar I" to reduce confusion, even when he did not work in the same wrestling promotion as his brother. On May 29, 1981 El Solar won a tournament for the vacant Mexican National Middleweight Championship, holding the title for 147 days before losing it to El Satánico. On November 2, 1985 he defeated Cachorro Mendoza to win the UWA World Middleweight Championship, a title he would vacate in 1986 due to an injury. He would later also hold the UWA World Junior Light Heavyweight Championship in the UWA, his last championship with the promotion before it closed. In 1992 he became the first ever UWF Super Middleweight Champion, but only held the title for four days before losing it to Robin Hood.

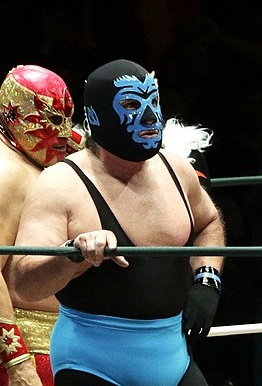
Mano Negra (front) and El Solar on November 30, 2018

In 1994 El Solar began working for Asistencia Asesoría y Administración (AAA), which had taken over the UWA's position as one of the two largest promotions in Mexico. In AAA he was given a new ring character, outfit and mask, becoming "El Mariachi" complete with a traditional sombrero and playing the trumpet as part of his entrance. He was teamed up with El Charro and El Mexicano to form the trio Los Folkloricos in AAA. The trio worked together in AAA before all three left AAA. Following his stint at El Mariachi he resumed working as El Solar, working regularly for Consejo Mundial de Lucha Libre (CMLL), Mexico's other major promotion. In CMLL he formed a team known as Los Soles de la Maldad ("The Evil Suns") teaming with El Hijo del Solitario. In the early 2000s El Solar worked primarily on the Mexican Independent circuit, especially wrestling against another seasoned pro, Negro Navarro, wrestling in a "Maestro Series" all over Mexico, drawing crowds with their "old school" matches. As part of their "Maestro Series" Solar introduced the South America Championship, a championship not backed by a promotion as such, but used to give an added air of prestige to matches between himself and El Solar. In 2008 El Solar was instrumental in the debut of his son, working as El Hijo del Solar (The Son of Solar). In 2011 Negro Navarro and El Solar began fighting over the FLMM Masters Championship, trading it back and forth on several occasions. El Solar was also one of the featured wrestlers in the short lived Lucha Libre USA show that ran for two seasons on MTV2, including winning the Lucha Libre USA Heavyweight Championship. On January 18, 2013 El Solar worked for International Wrestling Revolution Group (IWRG) and participated in their annual El Protector tournament, a tag team tournament where an experienced veteran is teamed up with a rookie wrestler for the night. El Solar teamed up with Saruman, losing to Pantera and his son El Hijo del Pantera in the first round. On May 3, 2015 he was part of IWRG's 2015 Festival de las Mascaras show, a show honoring legends of Lucha Libre, where he teamed up with Pantera I and Pantera II to defeat Canis Lupus, Eterno and Negro Navarro. In early May it was announced that El Solar would be the third member of "Team MexLeyendas" in AAA's Lucha Libre World Cup tournament, teaming up with Blue Demon Jr. and Dr. Wagner Jr.

== Championships and accomplishments ==
- Empresa Mexicana de Lucha Libre

- Mexican National Middleweight Championship (1 time)

- International Wrestling Revolution Group

- Copa Higher Power: 1998 - with Mr. Niebla, El Pantera, Shocker, Star Boy and Mike Segura

- Lucha Libre USA

- Lucha Libre USA Heavyweight Championship (1 time)

- Mexican Independent Circuit

- Americas Middleweight Championship (1 time)
- FLLM Masters Championship (3 times, current)
- UWF Super Middleweight Championship (1 time)

- Universal Wrestling Association

- UWA World Junior Light Heavyweight Championship (1 time)
- UWA World Middleweight Championship (1 time)
- UWA World Welterweight Championship (1 time)

- World Wrestling Association

- WWA Middleweight Championship (1 time)

== Luchas de Apuestas record ==
Winner (wager)	Loser (wager)	Location	Event	Date	Notes
El Solar (mask)	El Texano (hair)	N/A	Live event	N/A	
Solar I (mask)	El Hombre Lobo (mask)	N/A	Live event	N/A	
El Solar (mask)	Amenaza Blanca (mask)	N/A	Live event	February 1, 1977	
El Solar (mask)	Dr. O'Borman (mask)	Mexico City	Live event	December 9, 1979	
El Solar and Halcón 78 (masks)	Los Comandos (masks) (Comando I and Comando II)	Mexico City	Live event	August 3, 1980	
El Solar (mask)	Senior Lee (mask)	Puebla, Puebla	Live event	May 6, 1983	
Los Cadetes del Espacio (masks) (El Solar, Super Astro and Ultraman)	Los Temerarios (hair) (Black Terry, Jose Luis Feliciano and Lobo Rubio)	Naucalpan, State of Mexico	Live event	July 8, 1984	
El Solar (mask)	Hombre Verde (mask)	Monterrey, Nuevo Leon	Live event	1987	
El Solar (mask)	Destroyer (mask)	Mexico City	Live event	March 5, 1988	
El Solar (mask)	Kraken (mask)	Puebla, Puebla	Live event	July 2, 2001	
El Solar (mask)	Kiss (hair)	Tijuana, Baja California	Live event	August 3, 2001	
El Solar (mask)	El Signo (hair)	Pachuca, Hidalgo	Live event	December 17, 2002	
El Solar (mask)	Mano Negra (hair)	Tulancingo, Hidalgo	Live event	September 19, 2010	
