= Torneo Gran Alternativa (2016) =

Mexican professional wrestling tournament

- Official poster for the April 5 CMLL show with the Gran Alternativa finale.
- Promotion: Consejo Mundial de Lucha Libre
- Date: March 22, 2016 – April 5, 2016
- City: Mexico City, Mexico
- Venue: Arena México

Event chronology
| ← Previous; Homenae a Dos Leyendas | Next → Torneo Nacional de Parejas Increíbles |

Torneo Gran Alternativa chronology
| ← Previous; 2014 | Next → 2017 |

The Torneo Gran Alternativa (2016) was a professional wrestling tournament event produced by the Mexican wrestling promotion Consejo Mundial de Lucha Libre (CMLLl; Spanish "World Wrestling Council") that began on March 22, 2016 and ran over the course of three of CMLL's Tuesday night shows in Arena México through April 5. The Torneo Gran Alternativa (Great alternative tournament) concept sees a Novato or rookie team up with an experienced wrestler for a tag team tournament. The rookie winner is often elevated up the ranks of CMLL as a result of winning the tournament, but there is no specific "prize" for winning the tournament beyond a symbolic trophy.

After not holding a Gran Alternativa in 2015 CMLL brought the concept back in 2016, this time holding the first block of the tournament on their Tuesday show in Arena México as opposed to previous years where they held it on their Friday night Super Viernes shows. The 2016 tournament was the 21st Gran Alternativa tournament that CMLL has held since its inception in 1994 and was won by Esfinge and Volador Jr. as they defeated Fujin and Rey Escorpión in the finals.

== History ==
Starting in 1994 the Mexican professional wrestling promotion Consejo Mundial de Lucha Libre (CMLL) created a special tournament concept where they would team up a novato, or rookie, with a veteran for a single-elimination tag team tournament. The tournament was called El Torneo Gran Alternativa, or "The Great Alternative Tournament" and became a recurring event on the CMLL calendar. CMLL did not hold a Gran Alternativa tournament in 1997 and 2000 held on each year from 2001 through 2014, opting not to hold a tournament in 2015. The 2016 Gran Alternativa tournament will be the 21st overall Gran Alternativa tournament. All tournaments have been held in Arena México, CMLL's main venue and up until 2016 all tournaments had taken place on Friday nights, with the 2016 tournament being the first time the Gran Alternativa was held as part of CMLL's Tuesday night shows.

== Tournament background ==
The tournament features 15 professional wrestling matches with different wrestlers teaming up, some of which may be involved in pre-existing scripted feuds or storylines while others are simply paired up for the tournament. Wrestlers portray either villains (referred to as Rudos in Mexico) or fan favorites (Técnicos in Mexico) as they compete in wrestling matches with pre-determined outcomes. The tournament format follows CMLL's traditional tournament formats, with two qualifying blocks of eight teams that compete on the first and second week of the tournament and a final match between the two block winners. The qualifying blocks were one-fall matches while the tournament finals will be a best two-out-of-three-falls tag team match. Each qualifying block started with all 8 Novatos competing in a "seeding" battle royal to determine the brackets for the block.

Gran Alternativa participants

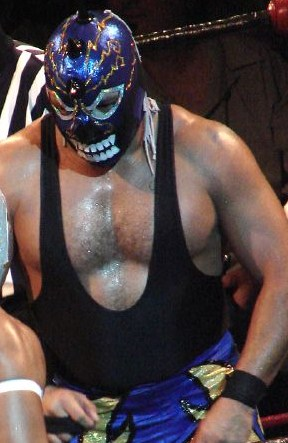
Mephisto, teamed with rookie Yago and was eliminated in the semi-finals.

| Block | Rookie | Veteran | Ref(s) |
|---|---|---|---|
| Block A | Rocky Casas | Negro Casas | |
| Block A | El Cuatrero | Rey Bucanero | |
| Block A | Flyer | Atlantis | |
| Block A | Fujin | Rey Escorpión | |
| Block A | Oro Jr. | Valiente | |
| Block A | Magia Blanca | Último Guerrero | |
| Block A | Super Halcón Jr. | Máximo Sexy | |
| Block A | Tritón | Mistico | |
| Block B | Esfinge | Volador Jr. | |
| Block B | Golden Magic | Rush | |
| Block B | Pegasso | Máscara Dorada | |
| Block B | Raijin | Comandante Pierroth | |
| Block B | Sansón | El Terrible | |
| Block B | Stigma | La Máscara | |
| Block B | Warrior Steel | Mr. Niebla | |
| Block B | Yago | Mephisto | |

Block A of the 2016 tournament marked the first time Rocky Casas, El Cuatrero, Flyer, Fuji, Magia Blanca and Super Halcón Jr. has competed in a Gran Alternativa tournament. The tournament also marked the CMLL debut of Rocky Casas and Arena México debut of Magia Blanca. Oro Jr. previously competed in both the 2013 and 2014; tournaments while Tritón was part of the 2012 tournament, and also worked the 2011 tournament under his previous identity of "Metal Blanco". For Block B the 2016 tournament marked the first time CMLL regulars Esfinge, Raijin, Sansón and Stigma competed in the tournament, with Raijin and Sansón making their CMLL debut in 2016. Warrior Steel and Yago had not worked regularly for CMLL prior to the tournament, but primarily worked for the CMLL-affiliated Lucha Elite promotion while Golden Magic had never worked a CMLL show prior to his entry in the Gran Alternativa. Pegasso was the lone rookie to have competed before, having been part of the 2010 Gran Alternativa tournament, six years prior.

On the veteran side Último Guerrero had won the tournament twice, in 1999 as a novato, and in 2008 as a veteran. In 2008 Guerrero won the tournament with Rey Escorpión as the rookie, two years later Rey Escorpión teamed up with Boby Zavala to win the 2013 tournament. Rey Bucanero won the second 1996 tournament as a rookie and Atlantis won the 2005 tournament as a vet. Block B veterans included Comandante Pierroth for the first time in his career, including previous stints in CMLL as "Poder Boricua" and "Poder Mexica". For the 2016 tournament veteran winner of the 2012 Gran Alternativa tournament El Terrible was teamed up with rookie Sansón.

== Tournament results ==
Block A of the 2016 Gran Alternativa tournament started out with all eight novatos fighting in a battle royal where the order of eliminations helped determine the team match-ups for the first round. Magia Blanca and Oro Jr. outlasted Flyer, Rocky Casas, Super Halcón Jr.Fujin, El Cuatrero and Tritón which meant that those two teams would face off in the last first round tournament match, giving them longer to rest before having to wrestle again. Due to their early elimination Flyer and Rocky Casas had to compete in the first tournament match moments after the battle royal concluded. Atlantis and Flyer defeated Rocky and Negro Casas to advance to the second round. They would be joined by Fujin and Rey Escorpión, Tritón and Místico and finally Magia Blanca and Último Guerrero. In the second round Japanese wrestler Fujin and Mexican Rey Escorpión defeated Atlantis and Flyer, which the tecnico team of Tritón and Místico defeated the rudos Magia Blanca and Último Guerrero. The final match of the March 22 show saw Fujin and Rey Escorpión defeat Tritón and Místico to qualify for the finals of the Gran Alternativa tournament.

In Block B the rookies followed the same pattern of first competing in a seeding battle royal. For the match Yago came to the ring wearing a spiked mask that resembled that of his "veteran" partner Mephisto as well as the robes normally worn by Mephisto's team Los Hijos del Infierno ("The Sons of the Inferno", Mephisto, Ephesto and Luciferno) as a sign of team unity. Golden Magic and Warrior Steel were the last two competitors, earning the rights to compete last in the tournament. Pegasso and Máscara Dorada defeated Sansón and El Terrible while Yago and Mephisto's unity and team work brought them the victory in the all-rudo match against Commandante Pierroth and Raijin. The teams of Esfinge and Volador Jr. and Golden Magic and Rush rounded out the last two teams to advance. In the second round, Yago and Mephisto continued to work well together, defeating Pegasso and Máscara Dorada to advance to the semi-finals. In the other quarter-final match Rush got himself intentionally disqualified when he pulled off Esfinge's mask in front of the referee. Afterwards, he showed little remorse over losing the match and little interest in his partner Golden Magic. In the semi-final, Mephisto pinned Volador Jr. but Esfinge ended up pinning the rudo veteran to earn his team a spot in the finals of the tournament. In the tournament finals Esfinge and Volador Jr. defeated Fujin and Rey Escorpión in the main event of the April 5 Arena México in a best two-out-of-three falls match to win the tournament. The victory marked the first time that both rookie Esfinge and veteran Volador Jr. won the Gran Alternativa tournament.

=== Tournament brackets ===
Round of 16
Atlantis and Flyer | W
Rocky Casas and Negro Casas
Fujin and Rey Escorpión | W
Super Halcón Jr. and Máximo Sexy
El Cuatrero and Rey Bucanero
Tritón and Místico | W
Magia Blanca and Último Guerrero | W
Oro Jr. and Valiente
Pegasso and Máscara Dorada | W
Sansón and El Terrible
Raijin and Commandante Pierroth
Yago and Mephisto | W
Stigma and La Máscara
Esfinge and Volador Jr. | W
Golden Magic and Rush | W
Warrior Steel and Mr. Niebla

Quarterfinals
Atlantis and Flyer
Fujin and Rey Escorpión | W
Tritón and Místico | W
Magia Blanca and Último Guerrero
Pegasso and Máscara Dorada
Yago and Mephisto | W;
Esfinge and Volador Jr. | W
Golden Magic and Rush

Semifinals
Fujin and Rey Escorpión | W
Tritón and Místico
Yago and Mephisto
Esfinge and Volador Jr. | W

Finals
Fujin and Rey Escorpión
Esfinge and Volador Jr. | W

=== Tournament shows ===
March 22, 2015 CMLL Martes

| No. | Results | Stipulations | Times |
|---|---|---|---|
| 1 | Magnus and Robin defeated Camorra and Inquisidor | Best two-out-of-three falls tag team match | 13:58 |
| 2 | Disturbio, Sangre Azteca and Skándalo defeated Hombre Bala Jr., Fuego and Star Jr. | Six-man "Lucha Libre rules" tag team match | 10:00 |
| 3 | Máscara Dorada, Stuka Jr. and Titán defeated Bobby Z and Los Guerreros Lagunero (Euforia and Gran Guerrero) | Six-man "Lucha Libre rules" tag team match | 10:00 |
| 4 | Magia Blanca and Oro Jr. defeated Flyer, Rocky Casas, Super Halcón Jr.Fujin, El Cuatrero and Tritón | Gran Alternativa 2016 seeding battle royal | 05:27 |
| 5 | Atlantis and Flyer defeated Rocky Casas and Negro Casas | Gran Alternativa 2016 first round tag team match | 02:53 |
| 6 | Fujin and Rey Escorpión defeated Super Halcón Jr. and Máximo Sexy | Gran Alternativa 2016 first round tag team match | 05:09 |
| 7 | Tritón and Místico defeated El Cuatrero and Rey Bucanero | Gran Alternativa 2016 first round tag team match | 06:43 |
| 8 | Magia Blanca and Último Guerrero defeated Oro Jr. and Valiente | Gran Alternativa 2016 first round tag team match | 06:16 |
| 9 | Fujin and Rey Escorpión defeated Atlantis and Flyer | Gran Alternativa 2016 Quarter final tag team match | 04:14 |
| 10 | Tritón and Místico defeated Magia Blanca and Último Guerrero | Gran Alternativa 2016 Quarter final tag team match | 06:59 |
| 11 | Fujin and Rey Escorpión defeated Tritón and Místico | Gran Alternativa 2016 semi-final tag team match | 04:54 |

March 29, 2016

| No. | Results | Stipulations | Times |
|---|---|---|---|
| 1 | Shockercito and Astral defeated Mercurio and Pierrothito | Best two-out-of-three falls tag team match | 14:39 |
| 2 | Canelo Casas, Misterioso Jr. and Sagrado defeated Magnus Hombre Bala Jr. and Super Halcón Jr. | Six-man "Lucha Libre rules" tag team match | 11:27 |
| 3 | Atlantis, Mistico and Valiente defeated Los Guerreros Lagunero (Euforia, Gran Guerrero and Último Guerrero) | Six-man "Lucha Libre rules" tag team match | 08:07 |
| 4 | Golden Magic and Warrior Steel defeated Esfinge, Stigma, Raijin, Yago, Pegasso and Sansón | Gran Alternativa 2016 seeding battle royal | 03:47 |
| 5 | Pegasso and Máscara Dorada defeated Sansón and El Terrible | Gran Alternativa 2016 first round tag team match | 05:03 |
| 6 | Yago and Mephisto defeated Raijin and Commandante Pierroth | Gran Alternativa 2016 first round tag team match | 04:32 |
| 7 | Esfinge and Volador Jr. defeated Stigma and La Máscara | Gran Alternativa 2016 first round tag team match | 07:25 |
| 8 | Golden Magic and Rush defeated Warrior Steel and Mr. Niebla | Gran Alternativa 2016 first round tag team match | 04:59 |
| 9 | Yago and Mephisto defeated Pegasso and Máscara Dorada | Gran Alternativa 2016 Quarter final tag team match | 03:08 |
| 10 | Esfinge and Volador Jr. defeated Golden Magic and Rush | Gran Alternativa 2016 Quarter final tag team match | 05:59 |
| 11 | Esfinge and Volador Jr. defeated Yago and Mephisto | Gran Alternativa 2016 final tag team match | 09:05 |

April 5, 2016

| No. | Results | Stipulations |
|---|---|---|
| 1 | Astral and Eléctrico defeated Pequeno Olimpico and Pequeno Nitro | Best two-out-of-three falls tag team match |
| 2 | La Amapola, La Comandante and Tiffany defeated Estrellita, Princesa Sujei and La Vaquerita | Six-man "Lucha Libre rules" tag team match |
| 3 | Nitro defeated Super Halcón Jr. | Lighting Match (One fall, 10 minute time-limit match) |
| 4 | Blue Panther, Blue Panther Jr. and The Panther defeated Disturbio, Puma and Tiger | Six-man "Lucha Libre rules" tag team match |
| 5 | Guerrero Maya Jr., Máscara Dorada and Máximo Sexy defeated Los Hijos del Infierno (Ephesto, Luciferno and Mephisto) | Six-man "Lucha Libre rules" tag team match |
| 6 | Esfinge and Volador Jr. defeated Fujin and Rey Escorpión | Gran Alternativa 2016 final tag team match |
