= CMLL Torneo Nacional de Parejas Increíbles (2016) =

2016 Consejo Mundial de Lucha Libre tournament

- Official poster for Block A of the tournament (April 15)
- Promotion: Consejo Mundial de Lucha Libre
- Date: April 15, 2016 to April 29, 2016
- City: Mexico City, Mexico
- Venue: Arena México

Event chronology
← Previous; Torneo Gran Alternativa	Next → Arena México 60th Anniversary Show

Torney Nacional de Parejas Increíbles tournaments chronology
← Previous; 2015	Next → 2017

The CMLL Torneo Nacional de Parejas Increíbles 2016 or "National Incredible Pairs Tournament 2016" was a tag team Lucha Libre tournament held by the Mexican wrestling promotion Consejo Mundial de Lucha Libre (CMLL). The tournament is based on the Lucha Libre Parejas Increíbles match concept, which pairs two wrestlers of opposite allegiance, one portraying a villain, referred to as a "rudo" in Lucha Libre wrestling terminology, and one portraying a fan favorites, or "técnico".

The tournament ran from April 15, 2016 through April 29, 2016, ending at the Arena México 60th Anniversary Show. The tournament was won by the team of Místico and Mephisto defeating the team of Carístico and Cibernético.

== History ==
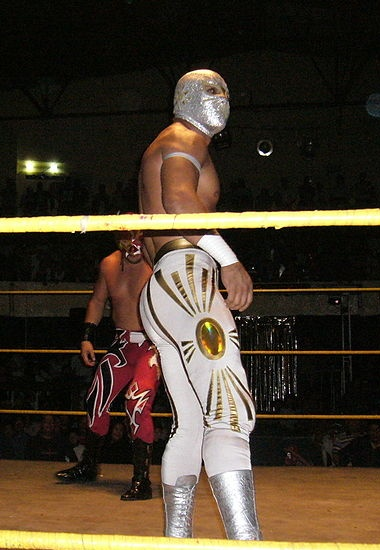
Carístico, teaming with rival Cibernético in the tournament.

The Mexican professional wrestling promotion Consejo Mundial de Lucha Libre (CMLL; "World Wrestling Council") held their first Torneo Nacional de Parejas Increíbles ("National Incredible Pairs Tournament") in 2010, from January 22 through February 5, marking the beginning of an annual tournament. CMLL has previous held Parejas Increíbles tournaments on an irregular basis and often promoted individual Parejas Increíbles and Relevos Increíbles ("Incredible Relay", with teams of three or more wrestlers). The Parejas Increíbles concept is a long-standing tradition in lucha libre and is at times referred to as a "strange bedfellows" match in English speaking countries, because a Pareja Increible consists of a face (referred to as a técnico in Lucha Libre, or a "good guy") and a heel (a rudo, those that portray "the bad guys") teamed up for a specific match, or in this case for a tournament. The 2016 tournament will be the seventh annual Parejas Increíbles tournament, and like its predecessors will be part of CMLL's regular Friday night CMLL Super Viernes ("Super Friday") shows to be held in Arena México, CMLL's main venue in Mexico City, Mexico.

For the Torneo Nacional de Parejas Increíbles tournaments, CMLL often teamed up a técnico and a rudo who are involved in a pre-existing storyline feud at the time of the tournament so that the tournament itself can be used as a storytelling device to help tell the story of escalating confrontations between two feuding wrestlers. In the 2012 Torneo Pareja Increíbles tournament, long time rivals Rush (técnico) and El Terrible (rudo) were teamed up for the tournament and ended up facing each other in the main event of the CMLL 79th Anniversary Show. Former friends turned rivals La Sombra (técnico) and Volador Jr. (rudo) teamed up for the 2013 Torneo Nacional de Parejas Increíbles and won the tournament. In the fall, La Sombra defeated Volador Jr. in a Lucha de Apuestas, or bet match, forcing Volador Jr. to unmask after the main event of the CMLL 80th Anniversary Show. In 2015, the Pareja Increíbles tournament was a direct build to CMLL's 2015 Homenaje a Dos Leyendas ("Homage to Two Legends"). The team of Máximo (técnico) and El Terrible (rudo) defeated the team of Volador Jr. (técnico) and Rey Bucanero (rudo) to win the tournament. Three weeks later, the four met again, this time with técnicos Máximo and Volador Jr. teaming up to defeat El Terrible and Rey Bucanero in the main event of the Homenaje a Dos Leyendas show, forcing the rudo team to shave their hair off.

== Tournament background ==
The tournament featured 15 professional wrestling matches with different wrestlers teaming up, some of whom were involved in pre-existing scripted feuds or storylines while others were simply paired up for the tournament. Wrestlers portrayed either rudos or técnicos as they competed in wrestling matches with pre-determined outcomes. The tournament format followed CMLL's traditional tournament formats, with two qualifying blocks of eight teams that competed during the first and second week of the tournament and a final match between the two block winners. The qualifying blocks were all one-fall matches while the tournament final was a best two-out-of-three-falls tag team match.

=== Tournament participants ===
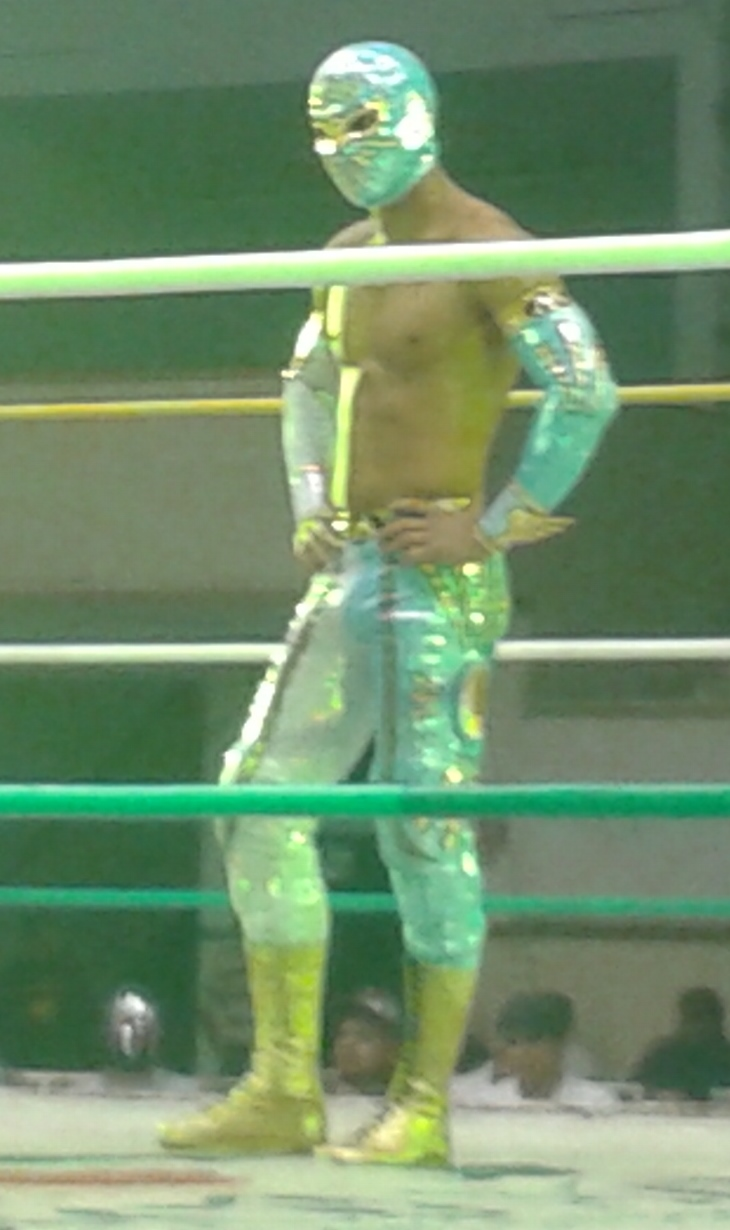
Místico teaming with the rudo Mephisto for the tournament.

CMLL announced the 2016 version of the tournament, as well as the first four teams, on their official Twitter account on March 30, 2016. Later that day, CMLL announced the entire field of sixteen teams.

Block A

- Ángel de Oro (técnico) and Pólvora (rudo)
- Blue Panther (técnico) and Ephesto (rudo)
- Marco Corleone (técnico) and Rush (rudo)
- Euforia (rudo) and Dragon Rojo Jr. (rudo)
- Máscara Dorada (técnico) and Bobby Z (rudo)
- Místico (técnico) and Mephisto (rudo)
- Súper Crazy (técnico) and El Felino (rudo)
- Volador Jr. (técnico) and Mr. Niebla (rudo)

Block B

- Atlantis (técnico) and Gran Guerrero (rudo)
- Brazo de Plata (técnico) and Kráneo (rudo)
- Carístico (técnico) and Cibernético (rudo)
- Dragón Lee (técnico) and La Máscara (rudo)
- Máximo Sexy (técnico) and El Terrible (rudo)
- The Panther (técnico) and Tiger (rudo)
- Thunder (rudo) and Último Guerrero (rudo)
- Titán (técnico) and Vangelis (rudo)

=== Ongoing storylines ===
In 2011 Rush, Marco Corleone and Máximo began teaming together regularly, forming a trio known as El Bufete del Amor ("The Law of Love"). The three defeated Los Hijos del Averno (Averno, Mephisto and Ephesto) to win the CMLL World Trios Championship. In May 2014, Marco Corleone suffered a knee injury, which forced the team to relinquish the trios championship. During the summer of 2015, Rush had begun teaming regularly with La Sombra and La Máscara to form a team called Los Ingobernables ("The Unruly"). With Corleone's injury and Rush teaming with Sombra and La Máscara on a regular basis, El Bufete was disbanded. In the winter of 2014, Rush broke his leg during a match, which led CMLL to replace him with Marco Corleone for all Ingobernables matches. When Rush returned, CMLL decided to let Corleone remain with the team, expanding it from a trio to a four-man group. In early 2016, Rush began targeting Máximo, now known as Máximo Sexy. During a match on the February 19 CMLL Super Viernes show, Corleone protected Máximo Sexy as Rush and La Máscara attacked him repeatedly. Moments later, Rush and La Máscara attacked Marco Corleone and kicked him out of Los Ingobernables. Two months after he was kicked out, Corleone was paired with his former teammate Rush in the Torneo. At the 2016 Homenaje a Dos Leyendas, Rush defeated Máximo in a Luchas de Apuestas match, forcing Máximo to shave all his hair off as a result.

== Tournament results ==
=== Tournament brackets ===
Round of 16
Máscara Dorada and Boby Z	W
Super Crazy and El Felino
Volador Jr. and Mr. Niebla	W
Blue Panther and Ephesto
Mistico and Mephisto	W
Ángel de Oro and Pólvora
Marco Corleone and Rush	W
Dragón Rojo Jr. and Euphoria
Carístico and Cibernético	W
The Panther and Tiger
Titán and Vangellys
Rey Escorpión and Último Guerrero	W
Atlantis and Gran Guerrero	W
Kráneo and Súper Porky
Máximo Sexy and El Terrible
Dragón Lee and La Máscara	W

Quarterfinals
Máscara Dorada and Boby Z
Volador Jr. and Mr. Niebla	W
Mistico and Mephisto	W
Marco Corleone and Rush
Carístico and Cibernético	W
Rey Escorpión and Último Guerrero
Atlantis and Gran Guerrero	W
Dragón Lee and La Máscara

Semifinals
Volador Jr. and Mr. Niebla
Mistico and Mephisto	W
Carístico and Cibernético	W
Atlantis and Gran Guerrero

Finals
Mistico and Mephisto	W
Carístico and Cibernético

=== Tournament shows ===
April 15, 2016 Super Viernes

No.	Results	Stipulations
1	El Cholo and Espanto Jr. defeated Bengala and Sensei	Best two-out-of-three falls tag team match
2	Demus 3:16, Pequeño Nitro and Pierrothito defeated Astral, Eléctrico and Último Dragoncito	Six-man "Lucha Libre rules" tag team match
3	Fuego, Rey Cometa and Tritón defeated Bárbaro Cavernario, Hechicero and Vangelly	Six-man "Lucha Libre rules" tag team match
4	Rush and Dragón Rojo Jr. defeated Mephisto, Pólvora, Mr. Niebla, Ephesto, Boby Z and El Felino	Torneo Nacional de Parejas Increíbles 2016 seeding battle royal
5	Máscara Dorada and Boby Z defeated Super Crazy and El Felino	Torneo Nacional de Parejas Increíbles 2016 first round tag team match
6	Volador Jr. and Mr. Niebla defeated Blue Panther and Ephesto	Torneo Nacional de Parejas Increíbles 2016 first round tag team match
7	Místico and Mephisto defeated Ángel de Oro and Pólvora Místico II	Gran Alternativa 2016 first round tag team match
8	Marco Corleone and Rush defeated and Dragón Rojo Jr.	Torneo Nacional de Parejas Increíbles 2016 first round tag team match
9	Volador Jr. and Mr. Niebla defeated Máscara Dorada and Boby Z	Torneo Nacional de Parejas Increíbles 2016 Quarter final tag team match
10	Místico and Mephisto defeated Marco Corleone and Rush	Torneo Nacional de Parejas Increíbles 2016 Quarter final tag team match
11	Místico and Mephisto defeated Volador Jr. and Mr. Niebla	Torneo Nacional de Parejas Increíbles 2016 semi-final tag team match
12	Atlantis, Carístico and Máximo Sexy defeated Rey Bucanero, Rey Escorpión and El Terrible	Six-man "Lucha Libre rules" tag team match

April 22, 2016 Super Viernes

No.	Results	Stipulations
1	Stukita and Shockercito defeated Mercurio and Pequeño Nitro	Best two-out-of-three falls tag team match
2	Esfinge, Pegasso and Tritón defeated Cuatrero, Skándalo and Virus	Six-man "Lucha Libre rules" tag team match
3	Ángel de Oro. Rey Cometa and Stuka Jr. defeated Euforia, Olímpico and Ripper	Six-man "Lucha Libre rules" tag team match
4	Atlantis and Brazo de Plata defeated Dragón Lee, Máximo Sexy, Rey Escorpión, Titán, Carístico and The Panther	Torneo Nacional de Parejas Increíbles 2016 seeding battle royal
5	Carístico and Cibernético defeated The Panther and Tiger	Torneo Nacional de Parejas Increíbles 2016 first round tag team match
6	Rey Escorpión and Último Guerrero defeated Titán and Vangellys	Torneo Nacional de Parejas Increíbles 2016 first round tag team match
7	Atlantis and Gran Guerrero defeated Kráneo and Súper Porky Místico II	TOrneo Nacional de Parejas Increíbles 2016 first round tag team match
8	Dragón Lee and La Máscara defeated Máximo Sexy and Terrible	Torneo Nacional de Parejas Increíbles 2016 first round tag team match
9	Carístico and Cibernético defeated Rey Escorpión and Último Guerrero	Torneo Nacional de Parejas Increíbles 2016 Quarter final tag team match
10	Atlantis and Gran Guerrero defeated Dragón Lee and La Máscara	Torneo Nacional de Parejas Increíbles 2016 Quarter final tag team match
11	Carístico and Cibernético defeated Atlantis and Gran Guerrero	Torneo Nacional de Parejas Increíbles 2016 semi-final tag team match
12	Máscara Dorada, Místico and Volador Jr. defeated Cavernario, El Felino and Mephisto	Six-man "Lucha Libre rules" tag team match

Arena México 60th Anniversary Show – April 29, 2016

No.	Results	Stipulations	Times
1	Los Cancerberos del Infierno (Cancerbero and Raziel defeated Flyer and Star Jr.	Best two-out-of-three falls tag team match	16:00
2	Marcela, Princesa Sugehit and Skadi defeated La Amapola, Dalys la Caribeña and Zeuxis	Best two-out-of-three falls six-woman "Lucha Libre rules" tag team match	14:20
3	Blue Panther, Hombre Bala Jr. and Stuka Jr. defeated Bobby Z, Hechicero and Kraneo	Best two-out-of-three falls six-man "Lucha Libre rules" tag team match	13:49
4	Rey Cometa defeated Cavernario	Lightning match (One fall, 10 minute time-limit match)	08:37
5	Volador Jr., Máximo Sexy and Máscara Dorada defeated Ephesto, El Felino and Rey Escorpión	Best two-out-of-three falls six-man "Lucha Libre rules" tag team match	10:40
6	Místico and Mephisto defeated Carístico and Cibernético	2016 Torneo Nacional de Parejas Increíbles tournament finals	15:36
