= CMLL International Gran Prix (2016) =

Mexican professional wrestling tournament

- Offifical poster for the 2016 International Gran Prix depicting all 16 tournament participants
- Promotion: Consejo Mundial de Lucha Libre; New Japan Pro-Wrestling
- Date: July 1, 2016
- City: Mexico City, Mexico
- Venue: Arena México

Event chronology
← Previous; Arena México 60th Anniversary Show	Next → Leyenda de Plata

International Gran Prix chronology
← Previous; 2008	Next → 2017

The CMLL International Gran Prix (2016) was a lucha libre, or professional wrestling, tournament produced and scripted by the Mexican professional wrestling promotion Consejo Mundial de Lucha Libre (CMLL; "World Wrestling Council" in Spanish) that took place on July 1, 2016 in Arena México, Mexico City, Mexico, CMLL's main venue. The 2016 International Gran Prix was the twelfth time CMLL held an International Gran Prix tournament since 1994 and the first one in eight years. All International Gran Prix tournaments have been a one-night tournament, always as part of CMLL's Friday night CMLL Super Viernes shows. The event was available as an internet pay per view (iPPV) both in and outside of Mexico.

The participants for the match were announced over a number of weeks, revealing the eight Mexican wrestlers who would face off against eight international wrestlers. In previous years, the "international" side has consisted of a combination of non-Mexican wrestlers who already worked for CMLL and foreign wrestlers brought in specifically for the tournament. The competitors for Team Mexico were announced as Diamante Azul, Máximo, Mephisto, Rey Escorpión, Rush, Shocker, Último Guerrero and Volador Jr. while "Team International" was announced as consisting of Johnny Idol, Kushida, Marco Corleone, Michael Elgin, Okumura, Sam Adonis, Tama Tonga and Tanga Roa. In the end Volador Jr. defeated Tama Tonga to win the match for Team Mexico. In the semi-final match Bárbaro Cavernario defeated Rey Cometa in a Lucha de Apuestas, or "bet match", after which Rey Cometa had all his hair shaved off as a result.

== Production ==
=== Background ===
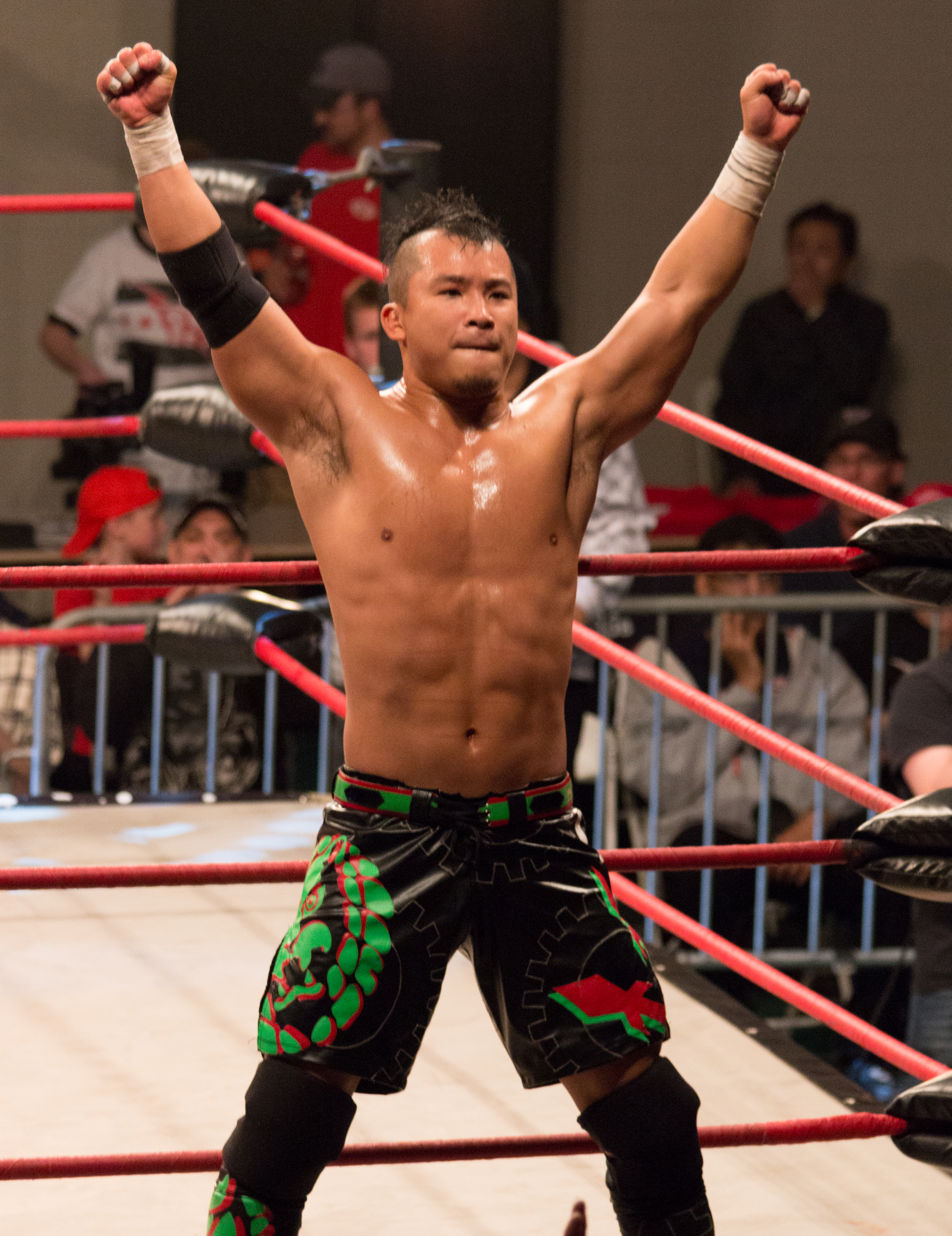
Kushida, representing Japan and New Japan Pro-Wrestling as part of "Team International".

In 1994 the Mexican professional wrestling promotion Consejo Mundial de Lucha Libre (CMLL) organized their first ever International Gran Prix tournament. The first tournament followed the standard "single elimination" format and featured sixteen wrestlers in total, eight representing Mexico and eight "international" wrestlers. Some of these international wrestlers were already working for CMLL at the time, such as King Haku and Corazon de León while others came to Mexico specifically for the tournament such as Japanese wrestler Yamato. In the end Mexican Rayo de Jalisco Jr. defeated King Haku in the finals to win the tournament. In 1995 CMLL brought the tournament back, creating an annual tournament held every year from 1995 through 1998 and then again in 2002, 2003 and finally from 2005 through 2008. The first five tournaments from 1994 through 1998 were all standard 16-man tournaments, but when CMLL brought the International Gran Prix tournament back in 2002 it was modified into a Torneo Cibernetico elimination match where an eight-man "Team Mexico" would face off against an eight-man "Team International" until only one team or wrestler survived.

Rayo de Jalisco Jr. won both the inaugural tournament as well as the 1998 International Gran Prix tournament, making him one of only two wrestlers to win the tournament twice. Último Guerrero won both the 2006 International Gran Prix and 2007 International Gran Prix, but was the last man eliminated in the 2008 International Gran Prix. Headhunter A (1995), Steel (1997) and Alex Shelley (2008) are the only "Team International" wrestlers to win a tournament prior to the 2016 International Gran Prix tournament. From 2009 through 2015 CMLL did not hold an International Gran Prix but they announced the return of the International Gran Prix in May 2016.

=== Storylines ===
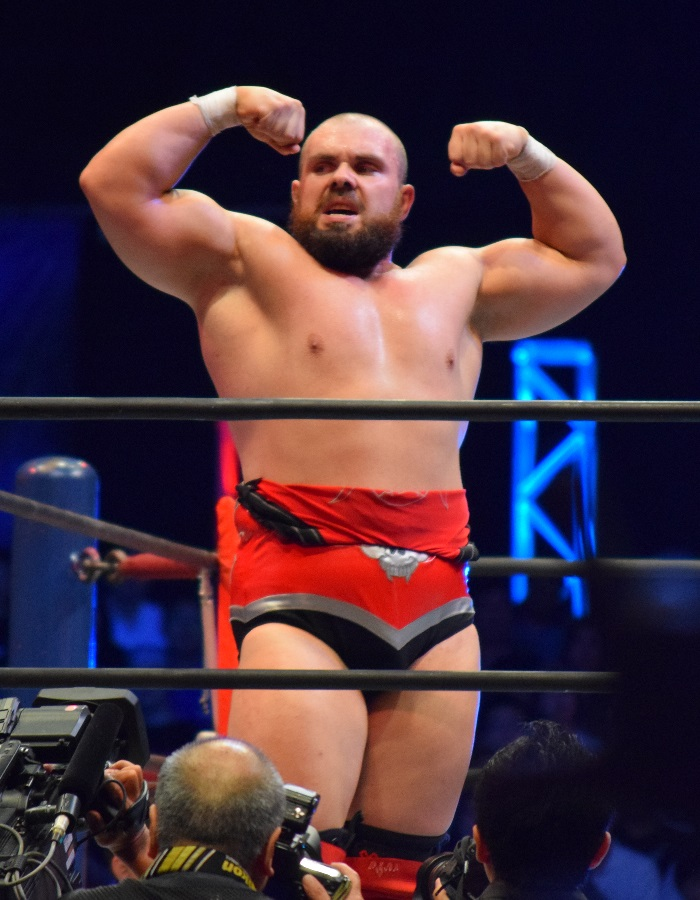
Michael Elgin, representing Canada in the tournament.

The International Gran Prix tournament and the July 1, 2016 CMLL Super Viernes show would feature several professional wrestling matches where wrestlers were matched up specifically for the tournament instead of as a result of pre-existing scripted feuds. The wrestlers themselves portrayed either heels (referred to as rudos in Mexico, those that portray the "bad guys") or faces (técnicos in Mexico, the "good guy" characters) as they perform for the fans before, during and after the matches. On June 1, 2016 CMLL held a press conference to reveal the details of the 2016 International Gran Prix. At the time CMLL officially announced "Team Mexico" which included Diamante Azul, Máximo, Mephisto, Rey Escorpión, Rush, Shocker, Último Guerrero and Volador Jr. At the time they did not announce "Team International" but it was confirmed via a promotional video that team international would be Johnny Idol (USA), Kushida (Japan), Marco Corleone (Italy), Michael Elgin (Canada), Okumura (Japan), Sam Adonis (USA), Tama Tonga (Tonga) and Tanga Roa (Tonga). Both Marco Corleone and Okumura were CMLL workers while Kushida, Elgin Tama Tonga and Tanga Roa were all sent by CMLL's Japanese business partner New Japan Pro-Wrestling (NJPW). Idol and Adonis worked on the US Independent Circuit and had worked in Mexico for Desastre Total Universal (DTU) earlier in 2016. During the June 3, Super Viernes show it was announced that the International Gran Prix would be available on internet pay per view (iPPV) in the same way they had made several of their previous major events available both in and outside of Mexico.

Marco Corleone, real name Mark Jindrak, was born and raised in the United States, but in CMLL his ring character "Marco Corleone" is portrayed as being Italian and had in the past represented Italy in previous International Gran Prix in 2006, 2007 and 2008. Okumura has worked for CMLL since XXX and has represented "Team International in the 2006, 2007 and 2008 International Gran Prix tournaments. All other "Team International" competitors are first time participants.

On the Mexican side Mephisto, Shocker, Último Guerrero and Volador Jr. have participated in previous International Gran Prix tournaments while it will be the first tournament for Diamante Azul, Máximo, Rey Escorpión and Rush. Mephisto participated in the 2002 and 2003 International Gran Prix, Shocker worked the 1996, 2003 and 2008 tournaments, Volador Jr. participated in 2002 and 2008, while Guerrero won both the 2006 and 2007 tournaments and was the last man eliminated in 2008.

The other featured match of the four-match Super Viernes show was a result of a long-running storyline between the tecnico Rey Cometa ("Comet King") and the rudo Bárbaro Cavernario ("Barbarian Caveman"). The two had originally clashed over the summer and fall of 2014, as they found themselves on opposite sides of six-man tag team matches where they would single each other out during the matches. On September 5, 2014 the two faced off in a 1-on-1 Lighting match on CMLL's Super Viernes show, a match that ended with the two wrestling to a very intense 10 minute time limit draw. After the match Rey Cometa challenged his opponent to put his hair on the line in a Luchas de Apuestas, or "bet match", Cavernario almost immediately accepted the challenge and the match was booked for the CMLL 81st Anniversary Show. Prior to this Apuestas match Rey Cometa had competed in four Apuestas matching, only losing one, where he was forced to unmask. Cavernario had competed in a total of five Apuestas matches, like Rey Cometa only losing one, which had forced him to unmask. Bárbaro Cavernario won the match, forcing Rey Cometa to be shaved bald afterwards. After that the feud between the two was settled and both moved on to other opponents.

Over the summer of 2016, the two former rivals found themselves facing off once more, rekindling the rivalry from 2014. The two faced off in a ten-minute, one fall match at the Arena México 60th Anniversary Show that ended with Rey Cometa defeating Cavernario. Afterwards Rey Cometa challenged Bárbaro Cavernario to put the Mexican National Welterweight Championship on the line at a later date, a match Bárbaro Cavernario agreed to a few weeks later. On June 10, 2016 Rey Cometa won the Mexican National Welterweight Championship as he defeated Bárbaro Cavernario two falls to one. During the introductions to a six-man tag team match on the June 17 Super Viernes show Rey Cometa dove onto Bárbaro Cavernario while still wearing the championship belt, striking Bárbaro Cavernario in the face by accident, leading to Bárbaro Cavernario being taken to the hospital to be checked out. The following week the two signed a contract for a second Lucha de Apuestas match between the two for the July 1 International Gran Prix show.

== July 1, 2016 Super Viernes results ==
No.	Results	Stipulations
1	Blue Panther, Blue Panther Jr. and the Panther defeated El Felino, Puma and Tiger	Six-man "Lucha Libre rules" tag team match
2	Atlantis, Místico and Stuka Jr. defeated Euforia, Mr. Niebla and El Terrible	Six-man "Lucha Libre rules" tag team match
3	Bárbaro Cavernario (with Zacarias) defeated Rey Cometa (with KeMonito)	Best-two-out-of-three falls Lucha de Apuestas, hair vs. hair match.
4	Volador Jr. defeated Tama Tonga to win the match for "Team Mexico"; Also in the match: Team Mexico (Diamante Azul, Máximo, La Máscara, Rey Escorpión, Rush, Shocker and Último Guerrero), Team International (Johnny Idol, Kushida, Marco Corleone, Michael Elgin, Okumura, Sam Adonis and Tanga Roa)	2016 CMLL International Gran Prix, 16-man Torneo Cibernetico
