= Arena México 60th Anniversary Show =

Mexican professional wrestling supercard show

- Official poster for the show
- Promotion: Consejo Mundial de Lucha Libre
- Date: April 29, 2016
- City: Mexico City, Mexico
- Venue: Arena México
- Attendance: 17,500

Event chronology
← Previous; Torneo Nacional de Parejas Increíbles	Next → International Gran Prix

Aniversario de Arena México chronology
← Previous; 59. Aniversario	Next →: 61. Aniversario

The Arena México 60th Anniversary Show was a major professional wrestling show produced by the Mexican lucha libre professional wrestling promotion Consejo Mundial de Lucha Libre ("World Wrestling Council"; CMLL) and took place on April 29, 2016, in Arena México, Mexico City, Mexico. The annual event commemorates the 1956 opening of Arena México, nicknamed "The Cathedral of Lucha Libre", CMLL's main venue and the largest arena ever built specifically for professional wrestling.

The show featured the finals of a three-week-long annual Torneo Nacional de Parejas Increibles tournament which saw the team of Místico and Mephisto defeat Carístico and Cibernético to win the entire 16-team tournament. On the undercard Rey Cometa defeated Cavernario, the reigning Mexican National Welterweight Champion in a non-title match.

== Production ==
=== Background ===
In 1933 professional wrestling promoter Salvador Lutteroth held his first Lucha Libre show as Empresa Mexicana de Lucha Libre ("Mexican Wrestling Enterprise"; EMLL) at Arena Modelo. Lutteroth would later move EMLL to Arena Coliseo, but that venue turned out to be too small in the long run and Lutteroth funded the creation of Arena México on calle Doctor Lavista #203, Colonia Doctores. on the intersection of Dr.Rafael Lucio, Dr. Carmona and Valle. The building was completed in 1956 and is to this day the largest arena built specifically for professional wrestling. The arena opened in April, 1956 and ever since then EMLL has celebrated the Aniversario de Arena México in April of each year. In 1991 EMLL was renamed Consejo Mundial de Lucha Libre ("World Wrestling Enterprise"; CMLL), only three years after it became the oldest, still-active professional wrestling promotion in the world. The 2016 version of the Anniversary show will be the 60th show, making it the third longest annual professional wrestling show, after the CMLL Anniversary Shows that began in 1934 and the Arena Coliseo anniversary show that began in 1944.

Over the years the Aniversario de Arena México show has hosted significant headline matches including several Lucha de Apuestas, or bet matches, where the loser of the match was forced to unmask or have their hair shaved off. The first documented example of a Lucha de Apuesta match headlining a show was at the 12. Aniversario where Huracán Ramírez defeated El Enfermero, forcing him to unmask. (Note: Records of early anniversary shows are sparse leaving the posibiity that previous anniversary shows also had Lucha de Apuestas matches featured.) In the main event of the 19. Aniversario, on May 25, 1975, Perro Aguayo defeated long time rival Ray Mendoza to force Mendoza to be shaved bald afterwards. Two years later, at the 20. Aniversario, Fishman gained one of the biggest victories of his career when he defeated El Faraón, forcing El Faraón to unmask and reveal his real name. Two years later (22. Aniversario) El Faraón and Ringo Mendoza successfully defended their hair as they defeated Alfonso Dantés and Sangre Chicana in the main event Lucha de Apuestas match. The most recent major mask match took place on April 3, 1992 at the 36. Aniversario, in the main event Blue Panther defeated American Love Machine when Love Machine was disqualified for using an illegal move that he did not realize was illegal in Mexico, forcing himself to unmask and reveal that he was actually Art Barr under the mask. The most recent major Lucha de Apuesta hair match was at the 44. Aniversario show where Shocker defeated Vampiro Canadiense, leaving the Canadian bald as a result.

In recent years the Aniversario shows have hosted part of all of one of CMLL's annual Spring tournaments. The 38. Aniversario de Arena México show, hosted the 1994 International Gran Prix tournament where Rayo de Jalisco Jr. defeated King Haku in the finals of the 16-man tournament. The 39. Aniversario featured the 1995 Gran Alternativa tournament, which was won by Shocker and Silver King when they defeated Astro Rey Jr. and Dr. Wagner Jr. The focal point of the 43 Aniversario show was the first of that year's Gran Alternativa tournament. The tournament was won by Último Guerrero and Blue Panthera as they defeated Atlantico and Mr. Niebla. It would be 11 years later before the Aniversario shows would host another tournament, as the 2010 Gran Alternativa was part of the 54. Aniversario show. That year the team of Pólvora and Héctor Garza defeated Diamante and La Sombra to qualify for the Gran Alternativa tournament two weeks later. The following year (55. Aniversario) CMLL held two matches in their Forjando un Ídolo tournament series, Hijo del Signo defeated Puma King and Diamante defeated Hombre Bala Jr. In 2012, at the 56. Aniversario show, CMLL held a round of their En Busca de un Ídolo ("In search of an Idol") tournament, where Tritón defeated Puma King and Pólvora defeated Dragon Lee.

=== Storylines ===
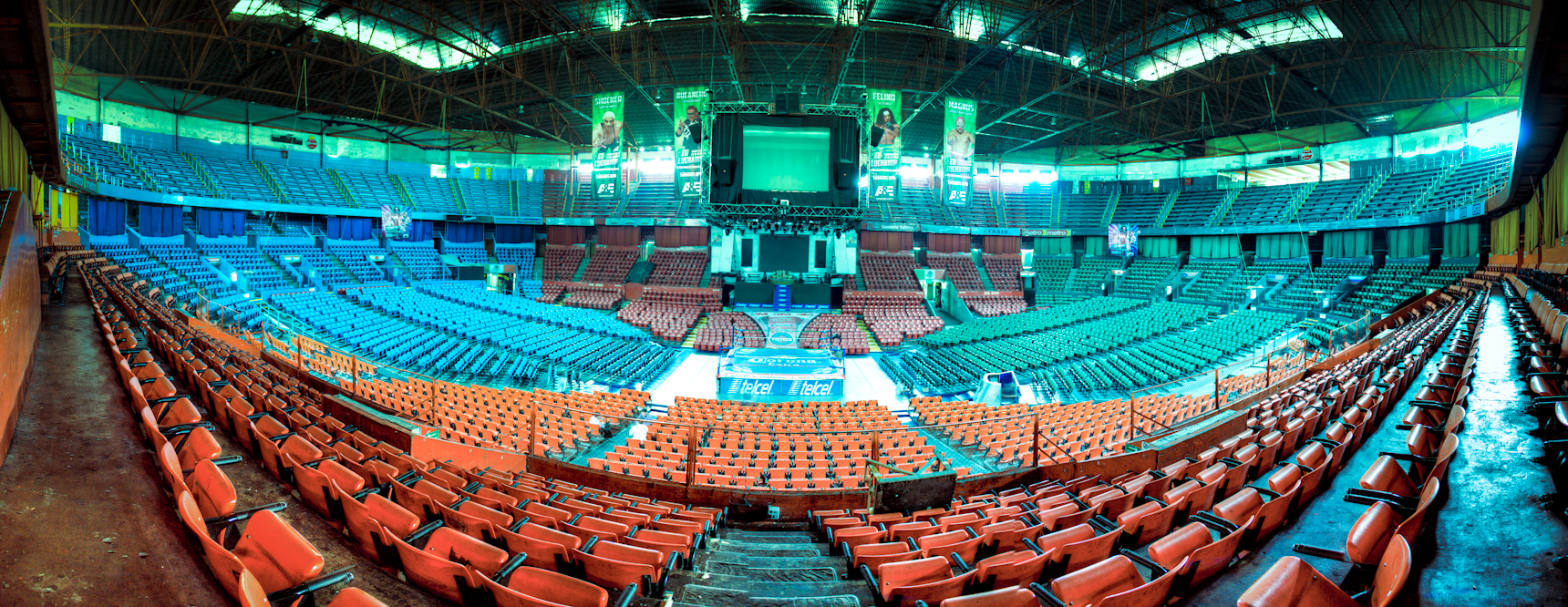
The interior of Arena México when it is set up for a professional wrestling show.

The event will feature six professional wrestling matches with different wrestlers involved in pre-existing scripted feuds, plots and storylines. Wrestlers were portrayed as either heels (referred to as rudos in Mexico, those that portray the "bad guys") or faces (técnicos in Mexico, the "good guy" characters) as they followed a series of tension-building events, which culminated in a wrestling match or series of matches.

The show is slated to feature the final match of CMLL's annual Torneo Nacional de Parejas Increibles ("National Incredible Pairs Tournament"), the seventh annual tournament held by CMLL. The Parejas Increibles concept is a long-standing tradition in lucha libre and is at times referred to as a "strange bedfellows" match in English speaking countries, referring to the fact that a Pareja Increibles consists of a técnico and a rudo are teamed up for a specific match, or in this case for a tournament. The finalist will be determined on April 15 and April 22, 2016 where CMLL will hold Blocks A and B of the tournament. The qualifying blocks are all one-fall matches while the tournament finals will be a best two-out-of-three falls tag team match.

== Results ==
No.	Results	Stipulations	Times
1	Los Cancerberos del Infierno (Cancerbero and Raziel) defeated Flyer and Star Jr.	Best two-out-of-three falls tag team match	16:00
2	Marcela, Princesa Sugehit and Skadi defeated La Amapola, Dalys la Caribeña and Zeuxis	Best two-out-of-three falls six-woman "Lucha Libre rules" tag team match	14:20
3	Blue Panther, Hombre Bala Jr. and Stuka Jr. defeated Bobby Z, Hechicero and Kraneo	Best two-out-of-three falls six-man "Lucha Libre rules" tag team match	13:49
4	Rey Cometa defeated Cavernario	Lightning match (One fall, 10 minute time-limit match)	08:37
5	Volador Jr., Máximo Sexy and Máscara Dorada defeated Ephesto, El Felino and Rey Escorpión	Best two-out-of-three falls six-man "Lucha Libre rules" tag team match	10:40
6	Místico and Mephisto defeated Carístico and Cibernético	2016 Torneo Nacional de Parejas Increibles tournament finals	15:36
