= Tama Tonga =

Tongan-American professional wrestler (born 1982)

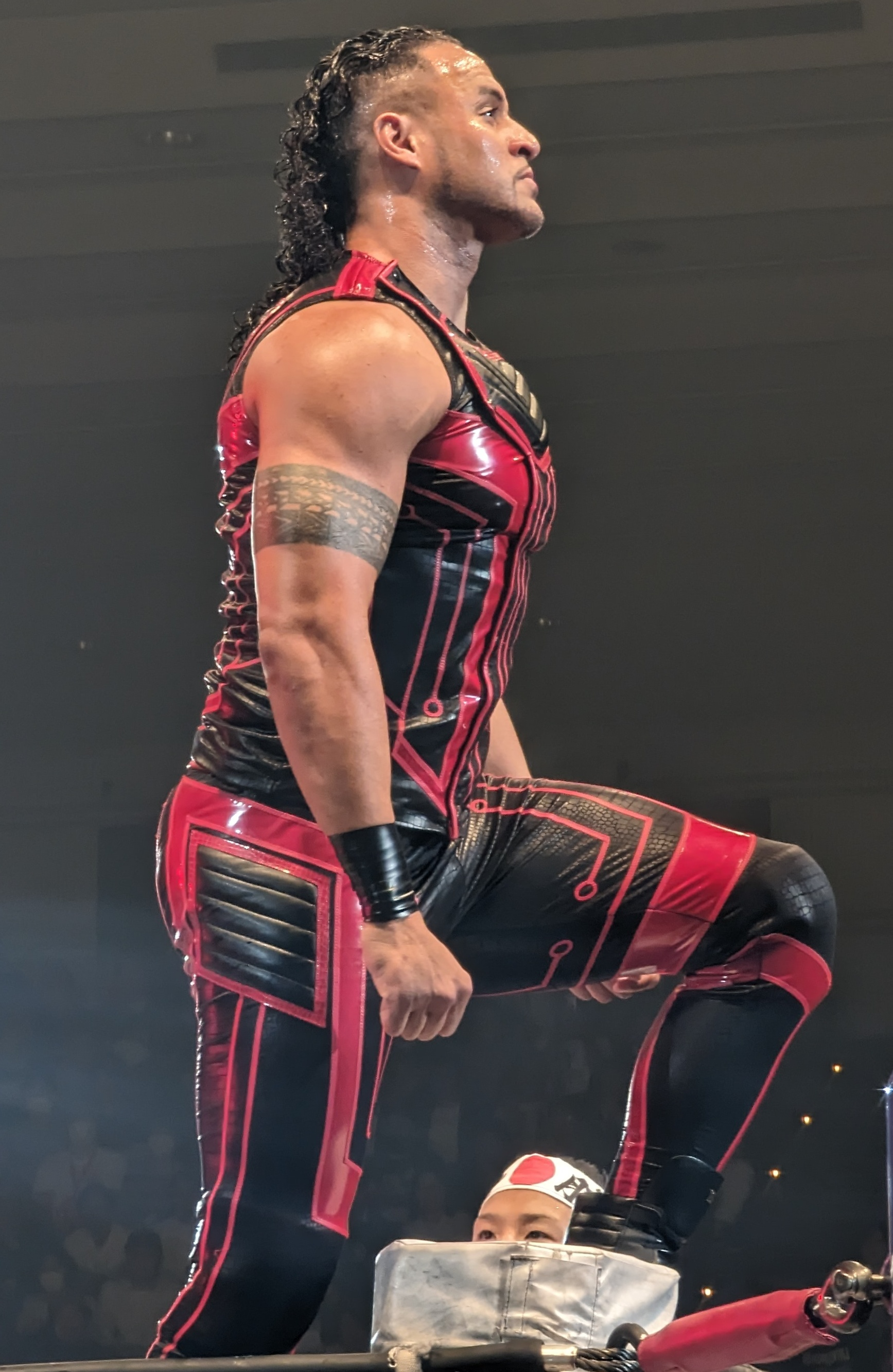
- Tonga in 2023

Personal information
- Born: Alipate Aloisio Leone; October 15, 1982 (age 44) Nukuʻalofa, Tonga
- Parent: Haku (uncle)
- Relatives: Tanga Loa (cousin); Talla Tonga (brother); Bad Luck Fale (cousin)
- Website: tamatonga.com

Professional wrestling career
- Ring name(s): Kava; King Tonga Jr. Pate Fifita; Tama Tonga; Tonga Strong Machine
- Billed height: 6 ft 0 in (183 cm)
- Billed weight: 220 lb (100 kg)
- Trained by: Dudley Boyz; Ricky Santana; Haku; Jado; Karl Anderson
- Debut: 2008
- Military service
- Allegiance: United States
- Branch: United States Air Force
- Service years: 2000–2005
- Rank: Technical sergeant

Alipate Aloisio Leone (born October 15, 1982), better known by his ring name Tama Tonga (Japanese: タマ・トンガ), is a Tongan-American professional wrestler. He is signed to WWE, where he performs on the SmackDown brand. He is a member of The MFTs tag-team and one-half of the WWE Tag Team Champions alongside his brother Talla Tonga.

From 2010 to 2024 he was in New Japan Pro-Wrestling (NJPW), where he was a founding member of Bullet Club alongside Bad Luck Fale, Karl Anderson and Prince Devitt. He was also a founding member of Guerrillas of Destiny (G.O.D.) alongside his brother Tanga Loa. Guerrillas of Destiny won the IWGP Tag Team Championship seven times, the 2020 edition of the World Tag League tournament, and due to the collaboration between NJPW and Ring of Honor (ROH), the ROH World Tag Team Championship. All totaled, between NJPW, CMLL, ROH, and WWE, Leone has held 13 World Tag Team Championships with various partners.

As a singles wrestler, Leone held the NEVER Openweight Championship four times. He has also worked with NJPW's partner promotion in Mexico, Consejo Mundial de Lucha Libre (CMLL) where he has held the CMLL World Tag Team Championship twice.

== Early life ==
Alipate Aloisio Leone was born on October 15, 1982 in Nukuʻalofa, Tonga. Leone and his younger brother Taula were adopted by their maternal aunt and her husband, professional wrestler Tonga Fifita – better known as Haku – from his native island of Tonga while they were visiting in 1991. They took him back to Poinciana, Florida where he grew up with his biological cousin and adoptive brother, fellow professional wrestler Tevita, and his older sister Vika.

After graduating from Poinciana High School, he joined the United States Air Force and was stationed for six years at Whiteman Air Force Base, serving as a B-2 Spirit mechanic. At the same time, Tevita was playing college football with the UTEP Miners. During a phone call in 2004, they decided they would become professional wrestlers once they had finished their respective obligations three years later.

== Professional wrestling career ==
=== Training and early career (2008–2010) ===
In January 2008, the brothers approached the Dudley Boyz to use the ring they had at the Team 3D Academy of Professional Wrestling and Sports Entertainment training school they operated in Kissimmee, Florida. They did not join the school at the time as they were being trained directly by their father and Ricky Santana, a family friend. To practice more frequently they eventually joined the academy proper and were partly trained by Bubba Ray Dudley and D-Von Dudley.

The brothers made their professional debut in November 2008, wrestling as a tag team under the name The Sons of Tonga (referencing their father) in Southern Championship Wrestling (Florida). They continued wrestling under the same name in World Xtreme Wrestling (WXW) and Puerto Rico's World Wrestling Council (WWC) until early 2009. Also in November 2008, they took part in a WWE tryout camp, two months later they were told that Tevita would be offered a contract by the company (he would later appear on television as Camacho) while Alipate would not.

Alipate continued wrestling as Kava in WXW during the year, winning the WXW Television Championship on 20 June 2009 though he lost it the same day. In the first part of 2010 he returned to WWC, first as a singles wrestler with the moniker King Tonga Jr. (his father had also wrestled in Puerto Rico as King Tonga). He later teamed with Idol Stevens, billed as The New American Family they briefly held the WWC World Tag Team Championship.

=== New Japan Pro-Wrestling (2010–2024) ===
==== Debut (2010–2012) ====
Leone went to Japan in 2010, initially going to New Japan Pro-Wrestling (NJPW) to train, he impressed enough to be hired by the company. He made his NJPW debut in May 2010 under the name "Tama Tonga". His debut match came as part of the 2010 Super Junior Tag Tournament, where he teamed up with Davey Richards, losing in the first round to El Samurai and Koji Kanemoto. Tonga was one of sixteen wrestlers who competed in the 2010 Best of the Super Juniors tournament. He defeated Nobuo Yoshihashi, and Akira, but lost to Ryusuke Taguchi, Fujita Hayato, Kenny Omega, Koji Kanemoto, and Taiji Ishimori, ending with four points, second to last his group.

He teamed up with Hirooki Goto, calling themselves Ara-tonga (a pun on Goto's nickname "Aramusha/Daredevil" and Tama's last name) to compete in the 2010 G1 Tag League tournament. They defeated the teams of Togi Makabe/Tomoaki Honma, and King Fale/Super Strong Machine, but lost to the teams of Manabu Nakanishi/Strong Man, Masato Tanaka/Tomohiro Ishii, and Yuji Nagata/Wataru Inoue, which meant they finished fourth in their group with four points. He also entered the 2011 G1 Tag League tournament, this time teaming up with Strong Man, calling themselves Muscle Pavilion. He had less success than the previous year with a solitary victory over the team of King Fale/Yuji Nagata, and losses against the other teams. On 4 January 2012, Tonga appeared in a dark match during Wrestle Kingdom VI (considered as NJPW's most important show), teaming with Captain New Japan to defeat Honma and Kyosuke Mikami.

==== Excursion to CMLL (2012) ====
In September 2012 it was announced that Tonga would go to Mexico from 10 October 2012 and work for NJPW's partner promotion, Consejo Mundial de Lucha Libre (CMLL). His debut match for CMLL saw him participate in the 2012 edition of CMLL's Leyenda de Azul tournament. The match was a 16-man torneo cibernetico elimination match, from which Tonga was eliminated when Atlantis and Shocker double teamed him. Following the tournament Tonga worked with a number of CMLL's top stars, including the Leyenda de Azul tournament winner Diamante Azul. On November 13, Tonga and El Terrible won the CMLL World Tag Team Championship from Atlantis and Diamante Azul. Tonga next made it to the finals of the 2012 La Copa Junior Tournament, where, on December 14, he was defeated by La Sombra in the main event of CMLL's 2012 Sin Piedad ("No Mercy") show.

==== Bullet Club and Guerrillas of Destiny (2013–2018) ====
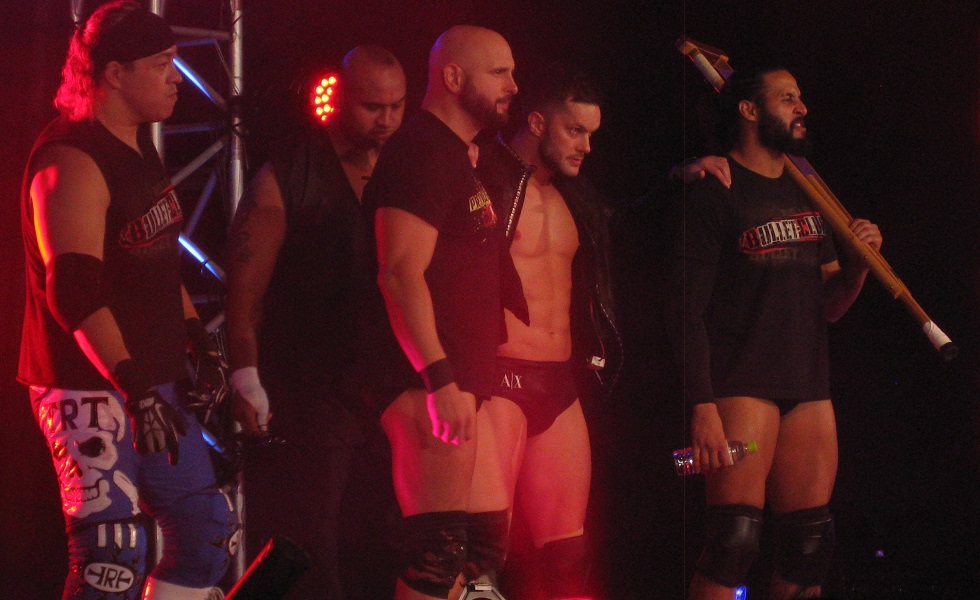
Tonga (far right) with Bullet Club in September 2013

Tonga returned to NJPW in early 2013, just in time to compete in Wrestle Kingdom 7 on January 4 where he teamed up with Captain New Japan and Wataru Inoue to defeat Jado, Tomohiro Ishii and Yoshi-Hashi by pinning Jado. On April 7, Tonga and El Terrible successfully defended the CMLL World Tag Team Championship against La Máscara and Valiente at New Japan's Invasion Attack event. On May 3 at Wrestling Dontaku 2013, Tonga followed Prince Devitt and Bad Luck Fale ringside after Karl Anderson's loss to Hiroshi Tanahashi where they all attacked Tanahashi. The four of them founded a new villainous stable named Bullet Club under Devitt's leadership.

On July 5, Tonga and El Terrible lost the CMLL World Tag Team Championship to Tanahashi and Jyushin Thunder Liger. Tonga regained the title from Tanahashi and Liger on September 14 with new partner Rey Bucanero. Tonga returned to CMLL with Bucanero in early October. On October 18, Tonga and Bucanero were stripped of the CMLL World Tag Team Championship when they were unable to defend the title against La Máscara and Rush due to Bucanero being sidelined with an injury. Tonga remained in CMLL until the end of the year.

Returning to Japan in 2014, Tonga participated almost exclusively in tag matches the next two years, He took part in the 2014 World Tag League with Bad Luck Fale in November of that year. They finished at the bottom of their block with a record of three wins and four losses. Tonga and Fale would team up again in the 2015 World Tag League for a worse result, picking up two wins for four losses to finish penultimate with four points.

On 4 January 2016, at Wrestle Kingdom 10, Tonga teamed with Fale and Yujiro Takahashi to take part in a match to determine the inaugural NEVER Openweight 6-Man Tag Team Champions, they were defeated by Jay Briscoe, Mark Briscoe and Toru Yano when Jay pinned Tonga. On February 11 at The New Beginning in Osaka, Tonga, Fale and Takahashi defeated the Briscoes and Yano in a rematch to win the NEVER Openweight 6-Man Tag Team Championship. After a three-day reign, the three lost the title back to the Briscoes and Yano at The New Beginning in Niigata. During February, Tonga accepted an offer to join WWE. However, NJPW retained him when they offered a new contract and hired his brother. On March 3, Tonga scored the biggest singles win of his career by defeating former IWGP Heavyweight Champion and reigning IWGP Tag Team Champion Togi Makabe in the first round of the 2016 New Japan Cup. The following day, he was eliminated from the tournament in the second round by Hirooki Goto.

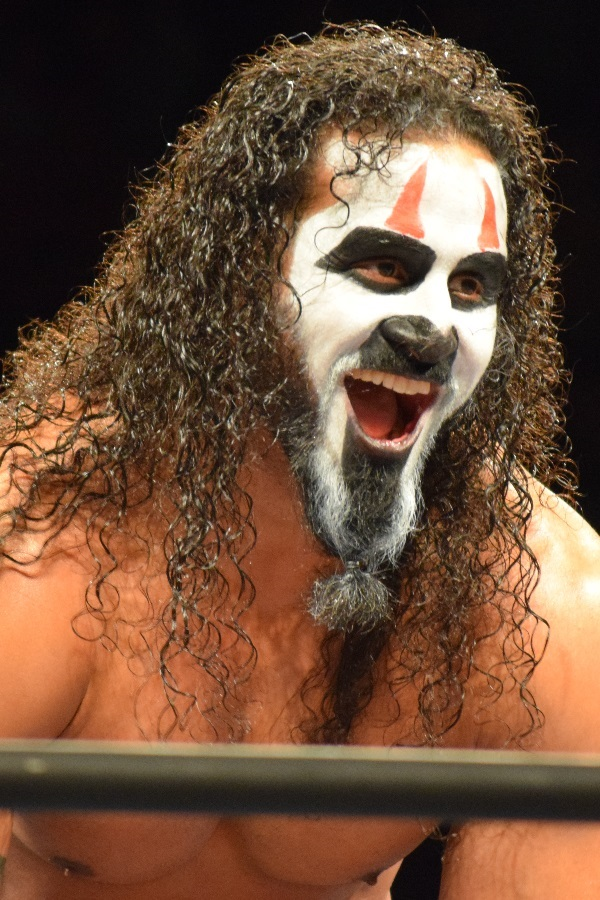
Tonga in March 2016

In March 2016, Tonga announced he would reform his tag team with Tevita in NJPW, recruiting him into the Bullet Club as Tanga Loa. The team was named "Guerrillas of Destiny" (G.O.D.). On April 10 at Invasion Attack 2016, G.O.D. defeated Makabe and Tomoaki Honma to become the new IWGP Tag Team Champions. They lost the title to Jay and Mark Briscoe on June 19 at Dominion 6.19 in Osaka-jo Hall. In late June 2016, Tonga returned to CMLL with his brother for a month-long excursion and the two competed in the 2016 International Gran Prix, where Tonga was the last eliminated, losing to winner Volador Jr.

Tonga was announced as one of the participants of the 2016 G1 Climax from 18 July 2016. NJPW's most prestigious tournament, it entitles its winner to an IWGP Heavyweight Championship title match at the next Wrestle Kingdom. Tonga's participation in the G1 was seen as a major step-up. In his third tournament match on 25 July, he scored the biggest win of his career by defeating Hiroshi Tanahashi (who had won the previous year's G1). Tonga finished the tournament on August 12 with a record of four wins and five losses.

Returning to tag team competition with G.O.D., he and his brother regained the IWGP Tag Team Championship from the Briscoe Brothers on October 10 at King of Pro-Wrestling. They reached the final of the 2016 World Tag League but lost to Makabe and Honma on December 10. On January 4, 2017, Tonga and Loa lost the IWGP Tag Team Championship to Tomohiro Ishii and Toru Yano in a three-way match, also involving Makabe and Honma. On June 11 at Dominion 6.11 in Osaka-jo Hall, Tonga and Loa defeated War Machine to win the IWGP Tag Team Championship for the third time. They lost the title back to War Machine in a no disqualification match on July 1 at G1 Special in USA.

Tonga participated in his second G1 Climax by entering the 2017 edition in July. He finished with a record of four wins and five losses. In December, G.O.D. won their block in the 2017 World Tag League with a record of five wins and two losses, advancing to the finals of the tournament. On December 11, they were defeated in the finals of the tournament by Los Ingobernables de Japón (Evil and Sanada). Six days later, G.O.D. and Bad Luck Fale defeated Evil, Sanada and Bushi to become the new NEVER Openweight 6-Man Tag Team Champions. They lost the title to Chaos (Beretta, Tomohiro Ishii and Toru Yano) in a five-team gauntlet match on January 4, 2018, at Wrestle Kingdom 12 in Tokyo Dome. The following day at New Year's Dash, they would regain the title from Chaos.

==== Bullet Club Civil War (2018–2019) ====
At The New Beginning in Sapporo, Bullet Club stablemate Cody turned on the leader of the stable, Kenny Omega. This led to there being two sides to Bullet Club; Team Cody and Team Kenny. While Tonga stayed neutral at Strong Style Evolved before a tag team match against Marty Scurll and Cody, Tama stated if he were to be on a team it would not be Team Cody. On the first night of the Wrestling Dontaku 2018 shows, G.O.D and Fale lost the NEVER Openweight 6-Man Tag Team Championship to the Super Villains (Marty Scurll and the Young Bucks). The second night, Tonga debuted the newest member to Bullet Club, Taiji Ishimori. Later, it was announced that Tonga would be competing in the G1 Climax 28.

At the G1 Special in San Francisco, Tonga, Loa, King Haku, Chase Owens, and Yujiro Takahashi defeated Chaos members Gedo, Yoshi-Hashi, and Roppongi 3K (Rocky Romero, Sho and Yoh), with Tonga pinning Gedo after a Tongan Death Grip by Haku to Gedo followed by a Gun Stun. At the end of the night, following Kenny's victory over Cody in the main event, Tonga, Loa, and Haku came out to seemingly celebrate with Kenny and the Young Bucks in a show of loyalty, only to attack The Elite, as well as fellow Bullet Club members Scurll and Hangman Page, even Owens and Takahashi, and finally Cody, when they tried to intervene. They then left the ring declaring that they were the true Bullet Club. From then on, Tonga and his associates would be announced during their entrances as members of Bullet Club OG, while the rest would be known as Bullet Club Elite.

In the 2018 G1 Climax, Tonga participated in the B Block, where he tied for last place with 6 points, down from the 8 he posted in the previous two years. However, Tonga did manage to defeat the IWGP United States Champion, Juice Robinson, as well as that year's B Block winner, Kota Ibushi. On the night of the G1 Climax finals, Tonga, Loa, and Ishimori won the NEVER Openweight 6-Man Tag Team Championship from the Super Villains in what was originally scheduled to be a showcase match but became a title match after Matt Jackson accepted a challenge from Loa to put the belts on the line. With this victory, Tonga became the first four-time NEVER Openweight 6-Man Tag Team Champion in NJPW history, and later that night, G.O.D. declared their intention to challenge the Young Bucks for the IWGP Heavyweight Tag Team Championship as well.

G.O.D. would end up dropping the tag team titles at Wrestle Kingdom 13 to Evil and Sanada in a three-way Match for the IWGP Heavyweight Tag Team Championship that also included The Young Bucks. On January 30, 2019, they lost the Never Openweight 6-Man Championship against Taguchi, Makabe, and Yano.

==== Seven-time IWGP Tag Team Champion (2019–2022) ====
On February 23, 2019, they would regain the IWGP Heavyweight Tag Team Championship by defeating Evil and Sanada at Honor Rising 2019: Day 2, starting their fifth reign. After defending the championships seven times, their reign would end when G.O.D lost to FinJuice (Juice Robinson and David Finlay) at Wrestle Kingdom 14. They would soon immediately regain the belts at The New Beginning in the USA event in Atlanta, before again losing them without a defence to Golden☆Ace (Hiroshi Tanahashi and Kota Ibushi) on a New Japan Road show in Korakuen Hall.

After the pandemic, Guerrillas of Destiny would make their return to Japan as participants of the World Tag League. They would win the tournament for the first time after defeating FinJuice in the finals. They would go on to win an IWGP Tag Team Championship match at the Tokyo Dome for the first time, defeating champions Dangerous Tekkers (Taichi and Zack Sabre Jr.) after Tanga Loa hit "ApeSh*t" (a sitout reverse piledriver) on Taichi after 19 minutes and 18 seconds. They lost the belts back to the Dangerous Tekkers on June 1.

==== Bullet Club departure, expanding of G.O.D, final days in NJPW (2022–2024) ====
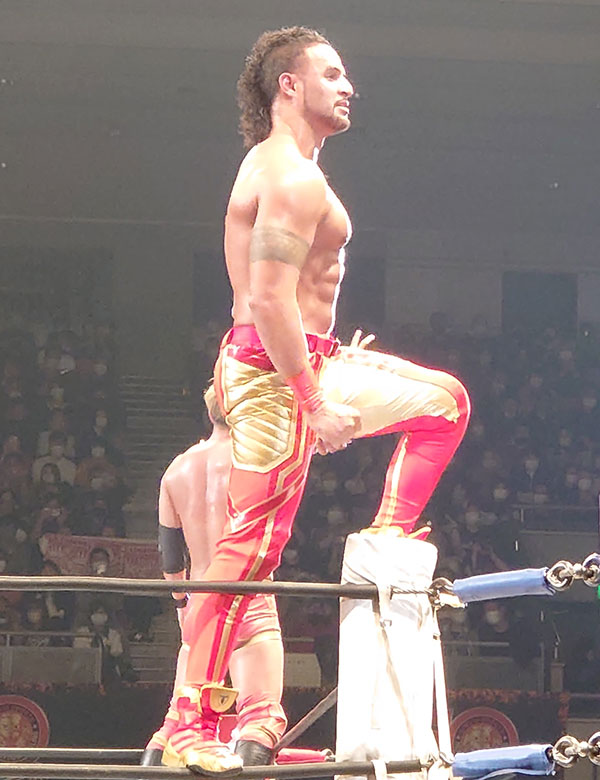
Tonga in November 2022

At No Surrender, Jay White interfered in G.O.D.'s match against former Bullet Club stablemates Karl Anderson and Doc Gallows by hitting his finishing move Bladerunner on Tonga causing them to lose the match. Afterwards, White, Chris Bey, and the Good Brothers all gave the 'too sweet' hand gesture in the middle of the ring signalling that Tonga and Loa had been kicked out of the group. In the 2022 New Japan Cup, Tonga faced Evil in the second round. During the match, House of Torture attacked Tonga, only to briefly be saved by the Japanese division of Bullet Club, before they also turned on G.O.D. and Jado. The following night, after losing to Bullet Club in a six-man tag team match, Tonga announced that Guerrillas of Destiny would become a stable. In March, Tonga, Loa and Jado formed an alliance with Ryusuke Taguchi and Master Wato (and later Hiroshi Tanahashi), and joined the Hontai stable which represents New Japan.

At Wrestling Dontaku, Tonga defeated Evil to win the NEVER Openweight Championship, his first New Japan singles championship. He lost the title to Karl Anderson at Dominion 6.12 in Osaka-jo Hall, ending his reign at 42 days. Also at the event, Tonga was announced to be a part of the G1 Climax 32 tournament in July, where he would compete in the B Block. He finished with 10 points, defeating IWGP World Heavyweight Champion Jay White to advance to the semi-finals. In the semi-finals match, Tonga was defeated by A Block winner Kazuchika Okada, therefore failing to make the finals. Due to knocking White out of the tournament, Tonga earned an IWGP World Heavyweight Championship match on October 10 at Declaration of Power, however failed to capture the title from White at the event. Tonga later defeated Anderson to regain the NEVER Openweight Championship at Wrestle Kingdom 17, becoming the first to win a NJPW title from a WWE contracted wrestler since the two companies' past partnership ended in 1985. At Wrestling Dontaku on May 3, he lost the title to David Finlay, ending his second reign at 119 days.

Two months later, Tonga would participate in the 2023 G1 Climax, competing in the C Block. Despite avenging his loss to Finlay, Tonga finished the tournament with 9 points, narrowly missing out in a place in the quarterfinals. On October 9 at Destruction in Ryogoku, Tonga defeated Finlay to win the NEVER Openweight Championship for the third time. On October 28 at Fighting Spirit Unleashed, Tonga lost the title to Shingo Takagi in his first title defense. On January 4, 2024, at Wrestle Kingdom 18, Tonga defeated Takagi to win the NEVER Openweight Championship for the fourth time. In a post-match press conference, Tonga announced he would be leaving NJPW due to his contract expiring and wanting to be closer to his family. On January 22 at The New Beginning in Nagoya, Tonga faced EVIL for the NEVER Openweight Championship. The match originally ended in a no contest, after Tonga was attacked by the House of Torture. The match was restarted into a lumberjack match, where Tonga lost the title to EVIL. Four days later, Tonga wrestled his penultimate match under his NJPW contract, where he, El Desperado, Tomoaki Honma and Yoh defeated House of Torture. Later that night, Tonga helped Shota Umino win his match against Ren Narita, alongside Desperado, following the interference from House of Torture, marking his final appearance for the promotion. At The New Beginning in Sapporo: Night 2, he wrestled his final NJPW match alongside his brother Tanga Loa against fellow G.O.D members El Phantasmo and Hikuleo, ending his near 14-year tenure with the company.

=== WWE (2024–present) ===
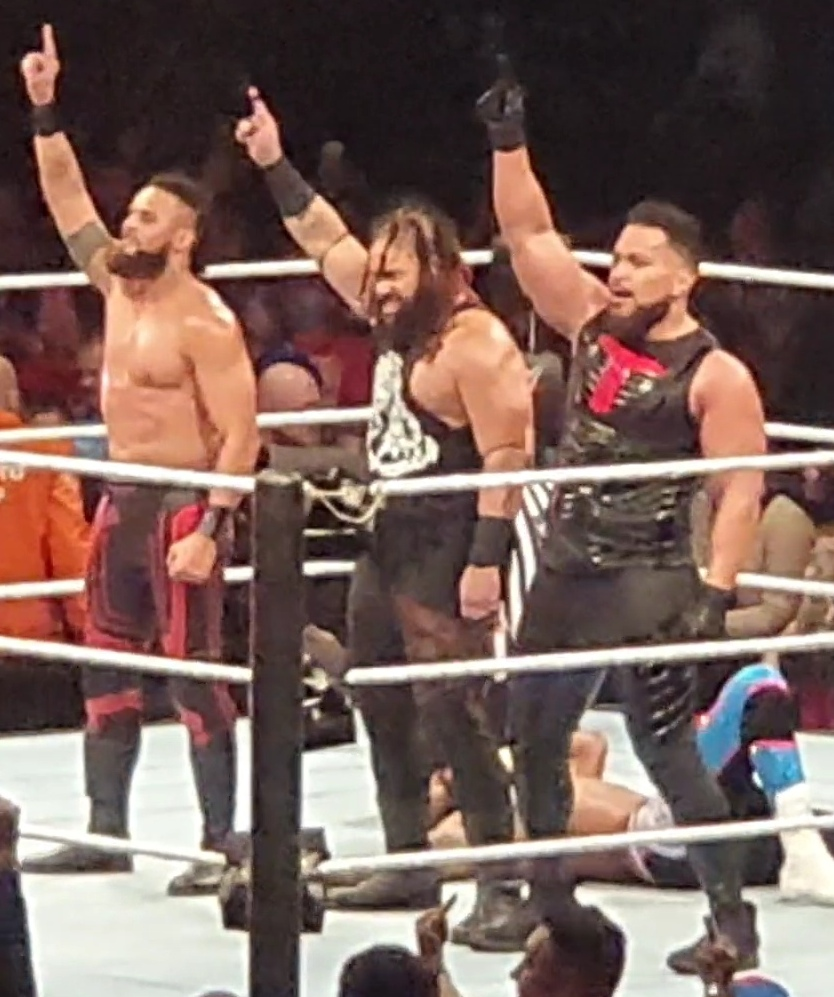
Tonga (left) with Jacob Fatu (center) and Tonga Loa (right) at a house show in November 2024

On the April 12, 2024 post-WrestleMania XL episode of SmackDown, Tonga made his debut for WWE attacking Jimmy Uso, establishing himself as a heel and in the process, becoming the newest member of The Bloodline stable. Then, The Bloodline started a feud with Kevin Owens assaulting him the following week on SmackDown and again on the April 26 episode of SmackDown, before Randy Orton made the save. As part of the stable, Tonga also received the moniker "MFT" (short for "Mother F'n Tonga") and "The Right Hand Man" (formerly used by Jey Uso). Later that night, it was announced that Orton and Owens would face The Bloodline (Sikoa and Tonga) in a tag team match at Backlash France. This would mark Tonga's in-ring debut in WWE. At the event, The Bloodline won the match following interference from Tonga's brother, the returning Tonga Loa who joined the stable. On May 10 episode of SmackDown, Tonga defeated Angelo Dawkins in the first round for the King of the Ring tournament. The following week he would defeat LA Knight in the quarterfinals, but lost to Orton in the semifinals, marking his first pinfall loss in WWE.

At Money in the Bank on July 6, Tonga along with Sikoa and the debuting Jacob Fatu defeated Cody Rhodes, Orton and Owens at in a Six-man tag team match with Sikoa pinning Rhodes. In the main event of the August 2 episode of SmackDown, the night before SummerSlam, Tonga and Fatu defeated DIY (Johnny Gargano and Tommaso Ciampa) to win the WWE Tag Team Championship marking Tonga's first title win in WWE. On the October 25 episode of SmackDown, Tonga and Loa lost the titles to The Motor City Machine Guns (Alex Shelley and Chris Sabin) ending their reign at 84 days. At Crown Jewel on November 2, Tonga along with Sikoa and Fatu defeated the original incarnation of The Bloodline Roman Reigns and The Usos in a Six-man tag team match with Sikoa pinning Reigns. At Survivor Series: WarGames on November 30, Tonga along with The Bloodline and Bronson Reed lost to Reigns, Usos, Sami Zayn and CM Punk in a WarGames match.

On the April 18 episode of SmackDown before WrestleMania 41, Tonga was assaulted by LA Knight in the parking lot and had his hand smashed through a car door. This was used to write Tonga off television as he had suffered an undisclosed injury. After a six-month hiatus, Tonga returned on the October 10 go-home episode of SmackDown before Crown Jewel: Perth with a considerably muscular frame and sporting the face paint he wore during his time with NJPW, taking out Sami Zayn and Shinsuke Nakamura in the process, thus joining the new MFT stable. On the January 23, 2026 episode of SmackDown, Sikoa and Tama won the WWE Tag Team Championship by defeating Dexter Lumis and Joe Gacy of The Wyatt Sicks. On the March 20 episode of SmackDown, Tama with JC Mateo defending the title on the behalf of Sikoa, would lose the titles to Damian Priest and R-Truth, ending their reign at 56 days. On the June 26 episode of SmackDown, the Talla and Tama separated themselves from Sikoa. On the July 31 episode of SmackDown, The Tongans returned, managed by their father, Haku, and reclaimed the MFT name. On the August 14 episode of SmackDown, The MFTs won the WWE Tag Team Championship after defeating The War Raiders (Erik and Ivar) and Damian Priest and R-Truth in a triple threat tag team match.

== Personal life ==
Leone is the cousin of Simi Taitoko ("Toks") Fale, both having spent their early childhoods in Muʻa, Tonga without meeting. They were in the NJPW dojo at the same time and realised they were related when a relative commented on a photo Fale had posted on social media.

In addition to his biological cousin, adoptive brother, and longtime tag team partner Tevita Fifita (best known under the ring name Tonga Loa), Leone's younger biological brother Taula Koloamatangi is best known for his tenure in New Japan Pro-Wrestling (NJPW) under the name Hikuleo.

Leone is also the nephew and adopted son of professional wrestler Tonga Fifita, who is best known as Haku and Meng.

He has performed alongside all of the above as members of Bullet Club (all), the Guerrillas of Destiny (his brothers), The Bloodline and currently the MFTs (his brothers).

== Championships and accomplishments ==
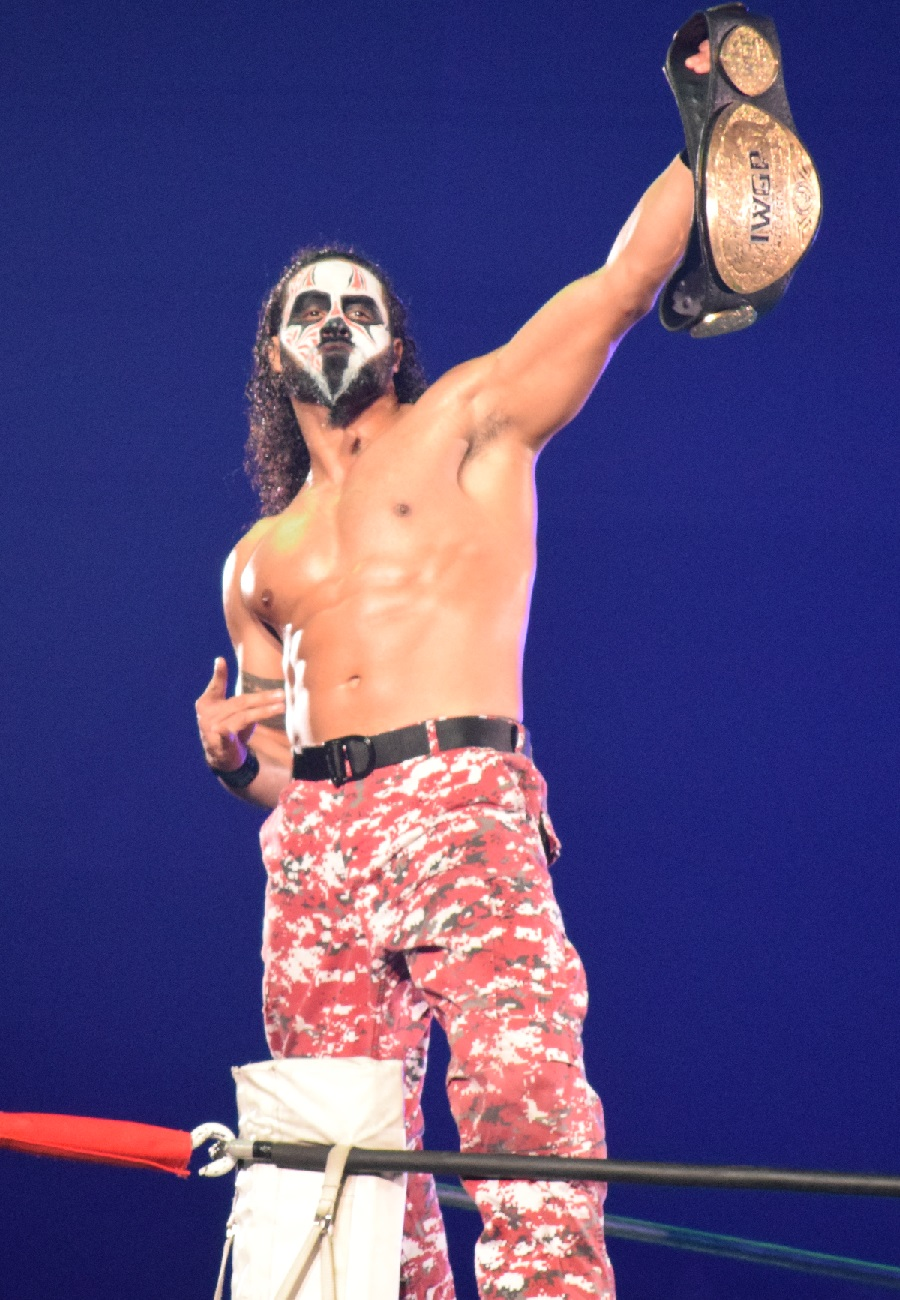
Tonga is a seven-time IWGP Tag Team Champion alongside his brother Tonga Loa

- Consejo Mundial de Lucha Libre
  - CMLL World Tag Team Championship (2 times) – with El Terrible (1) and Rey Bucanero (1)
- Jersey Championship Wrestling
  - JCW Championship (1 time)
- New Japan Pro-Wrestling
  - IWGP Tag Team Championship (7 times) – with Tanga Loa
  - NEVER Openweight Championship (4 times)
  - NEVER Openweight 6-Man Tag Team Championship (4 times) – with Bad Luck Fale and Yujiro Takahashi (1), Bad Luck Fale and Tanga Loa (2), Taiji Ishimori and Tanga Loa (1)
  - World Tag League (2020) – with Tanga Loa
- Peachstate Wrestling Alliance
  - PWA Heritage Championship (1 time)
- Pro Wrestling Illustrated
  - Faction of the Year (2024) – with The Bloodline
  - Ranked No. 94 of the top 500 singles wrestlers in the PWI 500 in 2019
  - Ranked No. 6 of the top 50 tag teams in the PWI Tag Team 50 in 2020 with Tanga Loa
- Ring of Honor
  - ROH World Tag Team Championship (1 time) – with Tanga Loa
- World Wrestling Council
  - WWC World Tag Team Championship (1 time) – with Idol Stevens
- World Xtreme Wrestling
  - WXW Television Championship (1 time)
- WrestleCircus
  - WC Big Top Tag Team Championship (1 time) – with Tanga Loa
- WWE
  - WWE Tag Team Championship (3 times, current) – with Jacob Fatu / Tonga Loa (1), Solo Sikoa (1) and Talla Tonga (1, current)
