= Oro Jr. =

Mexican professional wrestler (born 1992)

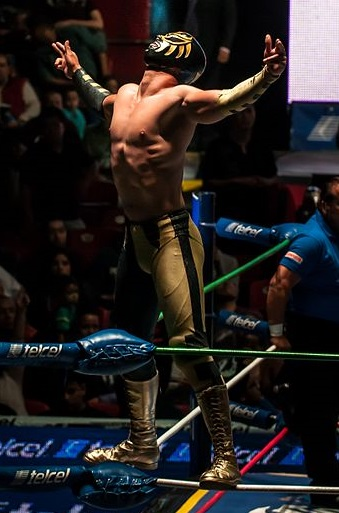
- Oro Jr. in 2013

Personal information
- Born: August 20, 1992 (age 34) Guadalajara, Jalisco, Mexico

Professional wrestling career
- Ring name: Oro Jr.
- Trained by: Hijo del Gladiador; CMLL Wrestling school
- Debut: August 14, 2012

Oro Jr. is a Mexican professional wrestler working for the Mexican promotion Consejo Mundial de Lucha Libre (CMLL), where he portrays a técnico ("Good guy") wrestling character. Oro Jr.'s real name is not a matter of public record, as is often the case with masked wrestlers in Mexico, where their private lives are kept a secret from the professional wrestling fans. It has been revealed that he is a third-generation wrestler, part of the Hernández family that also included his uncle, Oro (whom his ring name is taken from), as well as his father Plata and uncles Oro II, Plata II, Bronce II, El Calavera Jr. and Golden.

== Personal life ==
The man known under the ring name Oro Jr. is a third-generation wrestler. He is the son of Ismael Hernández Solís, who wrestled as Plata ("Silver"), and the nephew of Jesús Javier Hernández Solís, who wrestled as Oro ("Gold") until his death following a professional wrestling match. His extended family are all connected with wrestling, including uncles Oro II, Plata II, Bronce II, El Calavera Jr. and Golden, grandfather Calavera I and great uncle Calavera II. Oro Jr. never knew his uncle, as he was too young when Oro died in 1993, but heard so much about him from his father and uncles that he was inspired by him to become a professional wrestler, adopting the name "Oro Jr." in his honor instead of "Plata Jr." after his father's ring name.

== Professional wrestling career ==
=== Consejo Mundial de Lucha Libre (2012–present) ===
In Mexico, it is traditional to keep the true identify of a masked wrestler a secret, not revealing their real names and oftentimes not revealing what previous ring names they have competed under. No previous ring identities have been confirmed for Oro Jr., and it has been stated that his Consejo Mundial de Lucha Libre (CMLL) debut was also his professional wrestling debut; with the traditions of lucha libre (the professional wrestling style originally from Mexico), it is entirely possible that his debut date is for that of his ring character, not him personally, which means he could have previously worked under other names. Oro Jr. was introduced to the wrestling crowd the same night his uncle, Oro II, lost a Luchas de Apuestas ("bet match") and had to remove his mask after the match. He made his CMLL in-ring debut on August 14, 2012, in the first match of the night, teaming with Fresbee in a loss to Apocalipsis and Camorra.

Weeks later, Oro Jr. was introduced as part of Generacion 2012, a group of young wrestlers who made their debut in 2012, alongside Akuma, Espanto Jr., Genesis, Guerrero Negro Jr., Herodes Jr. and Taurus. In March 2013, Oro Jr. was one of 18 wrestlers who competed in the annual Torneo Sangre Nueva ("New Blood Tournament"), a tournament for young or low ranking wrestlers. He competed in qualifying block B on March 5 for a place in the finals; the other wrestlers in Block B included Disturbio, Genesis, Guerrero Negro Jr., Inquisidor, Robin, Sensei, Super Halcón Jr., Taurus and Zayco, who competed in a torneo cibernetico elimination match. Oro Jr. was the fifth man eliminated overall when he was pinned by Disturbio. Later that month, Oro Jr. was announced as one of the novatos, or rookies, in the 2013 Torneo Gran Alternativa ("Great Alternative Tournament"), which pairs a rookie with an experienced wrestler for a tag team tournament. On April 12, Oro Jr. and Máscara Dorada lost their first round match to Guerrero Negro Jr. and Último Guerrero. He fared significantly better in the following year's tournament on January 31, where he teamed with La Sombra; they defeated Akuma and Rey Bucanero in the first round and Blue Panther and Cachorro in the quarter-finals, before losing to Soberano Jr. and Volador Jr. in the semi-finals.

On March 24, 2014, Oro Jr. was one of sixteen wrestlers competing for a spot in that year's En Busca de un Ídolo ("In Search of an Idol") tournament. During the torneo cibernetico elimination match, Oro Jr. dove onto Metálico and landed poorly, hurting Metálico in the process. When Metálico returned from his injury a month later, he teamed up with Oro Jr., during which he began to argue with Oro Jr. after a move went wrong once again. The following week, Metálico turned rudo for the first time in his career as he attacked Oro Jr. at the end of a match against Canelo Casas, Disturbio and El Rebelde. After the match, Metálico stated that he blamed Oro Jr. for the shoulder injury that kept him out of the ring. Both wrestlers ultimately bet their wrestling masks in a Lucha de Apuestas on August 10, where Oro Jr. defeated Metálico for his first Lucha de Apuestas win, forcing him to unmask in the process. Oro Jr. and Soberano Jr. lost to El Cuatrero and Sansón in the opening match of Homenaje a Dos Leyendas ("Homage to Two Legends") on March 18, 2016. The following week, Oro Jr. and Valiente won a seeding battle royal to qualify for Block A of the Torneo Gran Alternativa, where they lost to Magia Blanca and Último Guerrero in the first round. On June 29, 2017, in that year's Torneo Gran Alternativa, he and Ángel de Oro lost to Carístico and Soberano Jr. in the first round. On December 24, in the main event of the Sin Salida ("No Escape") supercard, Oro Jr. was involved in a multi-man steel cage match where the loser would be forced to unmask. He was the third wrestler to escape the cage, watching as Starman defeated and unmasked El Hijo del Signo.

In February 2018, Oro Jr. and Magia Blanca participated in a tournament for the CMLL Arena Coliseo Tag Team Championship, but were eliminated in the first round by Los Cancerberos del Infierno (Cancerbero and Raziel). On December 3, 2019, Oro Jr. participated in the semi-final torneo cibernetico of the La Copa Junior ("The Junior Cup") tournament, where he first eliminated Leono before being eliminated near the end by Guerrero Maya Jr., the eventual winner. At Sin Salida on January 1, 2023, Oro Jr. was one of twelve wrestlers risking their mask in a steel cage match, where he was the second to escape; the match ended with Valiente Jr. defeating Apocalipsis for his mask. During a tag team match pitting Oro Jr. and Astral against Grako and Sangre Imperial on February 6, 2024, Oro Jr. attempted to perform an aerial maneuver on Imperial. However, while doing so, his right leg was caught between the second and third ropes, causing Oro Jr. to injure his knee and be carried out of the arena on a stretcher. The injury sidelined Oro Jr. for ten months, and he returned to action in December. On February 22, 2025, he was the first wrestler eliminated by El Hijo del Pantera in a tournament for the Copa Herederos ("Heirs' Cup"), which primarily featured the sons of wrestlers.

At Sin Salida on January 1, 2026, Oro Jr. again retained his mask in a multi-man steel cage match. In June, he, Brillante Jr. and Diamond formed a trio known as Las Gemas Metálicas ("The Metallic Gems").

== The Hernández wrestling family ==
The Hernández family has been in the professional wrestling business for three generations, starting with the brothers collectively known as Los Hermanos Calavera ("The Skull Brothers"). Their six sons and one grandson (Oro Jr.) either are or have been professional wrestlers at some point.

Father
Hermano Calavera II	Hermano Calavera I
Oro	Plata	Oro II	Plata II	Calavera Jr.	Bronce II	Golden
Oro Jr.

=== Oro in lucha libre ===
- Oro was the original luchador to use the name. He was such a popular wrestler and in-ring character that the name has been used by a number of other wrestlers since his death.
- Oro II, his brother Ismael Hernández Solís. He worked under the ring name Plata before Oro's death, and changed his name in honor of his brother, although he only used the name until 1995.
- Oro II (Second version), Ismael Hernández Islas, another brother who adopted the name and mask in 1995.
- Orito, a Mini-Estrella version of Oro that was active before Oro's death.
- Oro Jr. (I), Orito moved to the regular sized division and changed his name.

== Luchas de Apuestas record ==
Winner (wager)	Loser (wager)	Location	Event	Date	Notes
Oro Jr. (mask)	Metálico (mask)	Mexico City	CMLL show	August 10, 2014	
