= Torneo Gran Alternativa (2017) =

Mexican professional wrestling tournament

- Poster for the June 16, 2017 tournament final.
- Promotion: Consejo Mundial de Lucha Libre
- Date: June 2, 2017; June 9, 2017; June 16, 2017
- City: Mexico City, Mexico
- Venue: Arena México

Event chronology
← Previous; 61. Aniversario de Arena México	Next → Universal Championship

CMLL Torneo Gran Alternativa chronology
← Previous; 2016	Next → —

The Gran Alternativa 2017 is an ongoing professional wrestling tournament event produced by the Mexican wrestling promotion Consejo Mundial de Lucha Libre (CMLL; Spanish "World Wrestling Council") that began on June 2, 2017 and will take place over three editions of CMLL's Friday night Super Viernes shows. The Torneo Gran Alternativa (Great alternative tournament) was first held in 1994 and is CMLL's oldest recurring tournament. The 2017 Gran Alternativa tournament will be the 22nd tournament held. In the Gran Alternativa a Novato, or rookie wrestler, team up with an experienced or "veteran" wrestler for a tag team tournament. The rookie winner is often elevated up the ranks of CMLL as a result of winning the tournament, but there is no specific "prize" for winning the tournament beyond a symbolic trophy.

The team of novato El Soberano and veteran wrestler Carístico won the 2017 Torneo Gran Alternativa by defeating the team of Sansón and Último Guerrero in the finals on June 16, 2017. This marked the third time Carístico had won the tournament and the first time that Soberano had won the Gran Alternativa.

== History ==
Starting in 1994 the Mexican professional wrestling promotion Consejo Mundial de Lucha Libre (CMLL) created a special tournament concept where they would team up a novato, or rookie, with a veteran for a single-elimination tag team tournament. The tournament was called El Torneo Gran Alternativa, or "The Great Alternative Tournament" and became a recurring event on the CMLL calendar. CMLL did not hold a Gran Alternativa tournament in 1997 and 2000 held on each year from 2001 through 2014, opting not to hold a tournament in 2015. The 2016 Gran Alternativa tournament will be the 21st overall Gran Alternativa tournament. All tournaments have been held in Arena México, CMLL's main venue and up until 2016 all tournaments had taken place on Friday nights, with the 2016 tournament being the first time the Gran Alternativa was held as part of CMLL's Tuesday night shows. I 2017 the tournament returned to Friday nights, being held on the June 2, June 9 and June 16, 2017 Super Viernes shows,

== Tournament background ==
The tournament features 15 professional wrestling matches with different wrestlers teaming up, some of which may be involved in pre-existing scripted feuds or storylines while others are simply paired up for the tournament. Wrestlers portray either villains (referred to as Rudos in Mexico) or fan favorites (Técnicos in Mexico) as they compete in wrestling matches with pre-determined outcomes. The tournament format follows CMLL's traditional tournament formats, with two qualifying blocks of eight teams that compete on the first and second week of the tournament and a final match between the two block winners. The qualifying blocks were one-fall matches while the tournament finals will be a Best two-out-of-three falls tag team match. Each qualifying block started with all 8 Novatos competing in a "seeding" battle royal to determine the brackets for the block.

Gran Alternativa participants

Block	Rookie	Veteran	Ref(s)
Block A	El Cuatrero	Máscara Año 2000	
Block A	Esfinge	Atlantis	
Block A	Espanto Jr.	Kraneo	
Block A	Forastero	Shocker	
Block A	Pegasso	Blue Panther	
Block A	Sansón	Último Guerrero	
Block A	Star Jr.	Místico	
Block A	Stigma	Titán	
Block B	Akuma	Pierroth	
Block B	Astral	Valiente	
Block B	Canelo Casas	Negro Casas	
Block B	Drone	Niebla Roja	
Block B	Flyer	Volador Jr.	
Block B	Oro Jr.	Ángel de Oro	
Block B	Raziel	Mephisto	
Block B	Soberano	Carístico	

== Tournament results ==
=== Tournament brackets ===
Round of 16
Pegasso and Blue Panther	W
Star Jr. and Místico
Espanto Jr. and Kráneo
Sansón and Último Guerrero	W
Forastero and Shocker	W
Stigma and Titán
El Cuatrero and Máscara Año 2000
Esfinge and Atlantis	W
Canelo Casas and Negro Casas	W
Astral and Valiente	04:45
Akuma and Pierroth	W
Drone and Niebla Roja	08:07
Flyer and Volador Jr.	W
Mephisto and Raziel	06:53
Soberano Jr. and Carístico	W
Ángel de Oro and Oro Jr.	07:58

Quarterfinals
Pegasso and Blue Panther
Sansón and Último Guerrero	W
El Forastero and Shocker
Esfinge and Atlantis	W
Canelo Casas and Negro Casas	W
Akuma and Pierroth	00:00
Soberano Jr. and Carístico	W
Flyer and Volador Jr.	08:28

Semifinals
Sansón and Último Guerrero	W
Esfinge and Atlantis
Canelo Casas and Negro Casas	06:37
Soberano Jr. and Carístico	W

Finals
Sansón and Último Guerrero	19:39
Soberano (Note: CMLL changed Soberano Jr.'s name to Soberano before the tournament finals.) and Carístico	W
