= Los Metálicos =

Professional wrestling stable

Stable
- Members: Oro; Oro II; Plata; Plata II; Bronce; Bronce II; Platino; Platino II
- Debut: 1991
- Disbanded: 1993

Los Metálicos (Spanish for "The Metallic Ones") was a Mexican professional wrestling group, called a stable, who worked in Consejo Mundial de Lucha Libre (CMLL) between 1991 and 1993. The group worked as a tecnico (term used for wrestlers who portray the "good guys") faction. Most of the members of the team were brothers, part of the Hernández wrestling family, with only Bronce I, Platino I and Platino II are not related to the rest of the team. The team used metallic gimmicks such as Oro ("Gold"), Plata ("Silver"), Bronce ("Bronze"), and Platino ("Platinum") and all started out as enmascarados, or masked wrestlers with only one member being unmasked before his retirement or death.

== History ==
Los Metálicos started out with brothers Jesús Javier Hernández Silva and Ismael Hernández Solís adopting the enmascarado ("masked wrestlers) characters Oro ("Gold") and Plata ("Silver") with identical masks, only difference was that one had a gold pattern and the other had a silver pattern. The two were soon joined by a wrestler known as Platino (Platinum) to form a trio tag team known as Los Metalicos (The Metals). Platino was not a member of the Hernández but actually veteran wrestler Chamaco Valaguez under the mask. The team was quickly matched up against another trios team, a rudo ("Bad guy") trio known as Los Destructores ("The Destroyers"), with whom they had a series of very good matches. The fans quickly responded to the young team, vocally supporting the team when they wrestled, and showing appreciation for the fact that Plata and Platino were skilled high flying wrestlers and Oro had an aerial wrestling style that was unusual for the time. Oro's frequent and skilled execution of moves off the top rope helped usher in a style change in Lucha Libre as wrestlers started to incorporate more moves like planchas and topes, inspired by Oro's performances. Oro and Plata won their first professional wrestling championship just over a year after their debut, defeating Los Destructores to win the Mexican National Tag Team Championship on December 4, 1991. The following week a rematch between the two teams ended in a controversial manner and the championship was vacated. The following week Los Destructores regained the vacant title. Los Metalicos also captured the Distrito Federal Trios Championship at some point in 1991, but later lost the championship to Los Guerreros del Futuro ("The Warriors of the Future"); Damian el Guerrero, Guerrero del Futuro, and Guerrero Maya. In late 1991 Chamaco Valaguez abandoned the Platino character and retired, which led to a third Hernández being given the character.

Due to his style Oro was moved away from teaming with Los Metalicos to a singles career, which EMLL replacing him with Bronce (Bronze), a wrestling character patterned on Oro's image, but replacing gold with Bronze. Just like the original Platino Bronce was not a member of the Hernández family. EMLL put Oro in a storyline feud with veteran wrestler Mano Negra (The Black Hand). On May 23, 1993, Oro defeated Mano Negra to win the NWA World Middleweight Championship. This was the only singles title Oro held during his career. Mano Negra regained the title three weeks later on July 3. At some point during 1992 Bronce left EMLL and adopted a new ring persona. EMLL drafted a fourth Hernández brother to play the part of Bronce II. During the height of their popularity rival promoter Antonio Peña tried to lure the trio to leave EMLL and join Asistencia Asesoría y Administración (AAA) instead, but the move was never made. Instead Peña created a similarly themed trio called Las Gemas del Ring ("The Gemstones of the Ring"), consisting of three wrestlers in identical outfits and masks, except for the color of the gemstone they represented (Blue for Diamante, Silver for Brillante and golden for Zafiro). On October 26, 1993, Oro died following an in-ring mishap in one of the most infamous incidents in Lucha Libre. Following the death of the original Oro his brother Ismael Hernández Solís adopted the "Oro" ring character for about a year before retiring. Once Ismael Hernández Solís retired Ismael Hernández Islas took over the character, officially billed as Oro III. Following the deal of Oro Los Metálicos stopped working as a trio, with most of the members either retiring or adopting a different mask and character, only occasionally working under their Los Metálicos names with the exception of Oro II. In 2011 Oro III was introduced to the wrestling world; he later began working for Consejo Mundial de Lucha Libre (CMLL) as Oro, Jr.

== The Hernández wrestling family ==
The Hernández family has been in the professional wrestling business for three generations, starting with the brothers collectively known as Los Hermanos Calavera ("The Skull Brothers"), their six sons and one grandson who either are or have been professional wrestlers at some point. Oro, Plata/Oro II, and Plata II are all brothers, and Bronce II is their cousin; all of them sons of Los Hermanos Calavera ("The Skull Brothers").

Father
Hermano Calavera II	Hermano Calavera I
Oro	Plata	Oro II	Plata II	Calavera, Jr.	Bronce II	Golden
Oro, Jr.

=== Plata / Oro II ===
Plata was primarily relegated to tag team matches, teaming with Oro, Platino or Bronce, although at times he would participate in a high-profile event. In 1992 he participated in a tournament to crown a new CMLL World Middleweight Championship when the title was vacated due to previous champion Blue Panther leaving the promotion. Plata did not win the tournament. After his brother's death Plata took over the Oro character, but with far less success than his brother. In 1995 he participated in a tournament to crown a new NWA World Welterweight Championship, defeating Rey Bucanero, Jr. in the first round, but losing to El Felino in the second. Oro retired from active competition in 1995, letting one of his younger brothers take over the name Plata, working as Plata II. In 2009 the original Plata suddenly showed up in CMLL, wrestling a Luchas de Apuestas, or bet match, against Averno; Plata lost and had to unmask, revealing his real name as Ismael Hernández Solís.

=== Oro II ===
Ismael Hernández Islas, one of the younger Hernández brothers began his professional wrestling career in 1992, working under a mask, using the name "Excalibur". When his older brother retired Hernández Islas took over the ring name "Oro", becoming "Oro II" (despite being the third to use the name). Oro II would work on a regular basis for CMLL, even participating in the 2006 Reyes del Aire ("Kings of the Air") tournament, but he did not win. On March 5, 2011, Oro II was featured in the main event of the Festival Mundial de Lucha Libre (World Wrestling Festival) in a Luchas de Apuetas, mask vs. mask match against Fantasma de la Ópera (The Phantom of the Opera). Fantasma cheated to defeat Oro II, forcing him to unmask and reveal his real name. Oro II challenged Fantasma de la Ópera to a rematch, which Fantasma accepted only for Oro II to pin him unmasking Fantasma as well.

=== Plata II ===
Plata II took over after his older brother retired, but did little of note, working sporadically over the years. It is unclear if he has worked under another ring identity.

=== Bronce II ===
The wrestler that originally wrestled as "Bronce" abandoned the character, and later became known as Black Warrior. With the original Bronce gone, EMLL gave the ring character to a nephew of the Hernández brothers to keep the Los Metálicos group going. Following the death of the original Oro, Los Metálicos stopped working as a regular team, with Bronce II only occasionally working under that ring name.

=== Los Calaveras Jr. ===
Brother tag team Calavera Jr. I & Calavera Jr. II from CMLL (debuting in 2023) are members of the family. Their grandfather is Hermano Calavera II, making Los Metalicos their uncles.

== Championships and accomplishments ==
- Consejo Mundial de Lucha Libre
  - Mexican National Tag Team Championship (1 time) – Oro and Plata
  - NWA World Middleweight Championship (1 time) – Oro
- Comisión de Box y Lucha Libre Mexico Distrito Federal
  - Distrito Federal Trios Championship (1 time) – Oro, Plata and Platino

== Luchas de Apuestas record ==
Winner (wager)	Loser (wager)	Location	Event	Date	Notes
Oro II (mask)	El Depredador (mask)	Guadalajara, Jalisco	Live event	April 7, 2001	
Bronce II (mask)	Monje Maldito (hair)	Guadalajara, Jalisco	Live event	June 9, 2002	
Averno (mask)	Plata (mask)	Guadalajara, Jalisco	Live event	August 9, 2009	
Fantasma de la Ópera (mask)	Oro II (mask)	Guadalajara, Jalisco	Festival Mundial de Lucha Libre	March 4, 2011	
Oro II (hair)	Fantasma de la Ópera (mask)	Guadalajara, Jalisco	Festival Mundial de Lucha Libre	March 4, 2011	(Note: Oro II challenged Fantasma for a rematch immediately after losing his mask, Fantasma accepted and then lost the match.)
