= Oro (wrestler) =

Mexican professional wrestler (1971–1993)

- Hernández wearing his trademark wrestling mask

Personal information
- Born: Jesús Javier Hernández Silva; December 24, 1971 Guadalajara, Jalisco, Mexico
- Died: October 26, 1993 (aged 21) Mexico City, Mexico

Professional wrestling career
- Ring names: Apolo Montaño; El Doble; Oro; Rayo Mortal
- Billed height: 1.77 m (5 ft 9 1/2 in)
- Billed weight: 88 kg (194 lb)
- Trained by: El Calavera II; Diablo Velasco
- Debut: November 23, 1990

Jesús Javier Hernández Silva (December 24, 1971 – October 26, 1993), better known under the ring name Oro ("Gold"), was a Mexican professional wrestler. He was a second-generation wrestler, and several of his brothers and cousins were also professional wrestlers.

Hernández was best known for his time with Consejo Mundial de Lucha Libre (CMLL), where he won the Mexican National Tag Team Championship with his brother Plata, as well as the NWA World Middleweight Championship. He died in 1993 as a direct result of a professional wrestling match. His nephew works for CMLL as Oro Jr. as a homage to his uncle.

== Early life ==
Born in Guadalajara, Jalisco, he and his brother Esteban Hernández Silva wanted to become professional luchadores like their father, Esteban Hernandez, who wrestled as Calavera II ("The Skull II"), forming a tag team known as Los Hermanos Calavera ("The Skull Brothers") with his brother Calavera I. His father was initially reluctant of the idea of his sons becoming professional wrestlers, but he finally agreed to teach them some basic moves before sending them to the Empresa Mexicana de Lucha Libre (EMLL, later renamed Consejo Mundial de Lucha Libre (CMLL))-run gym at Arena México, where they received further training from Diablo Velasco.

== Professional wrestling career ==
The two brothers made their professional wrestling debut on November 23, 1990. Jesús Javier, at the age of 18, worked under the ring name Oro, while his brother used the name Plata ("Silver"). The duo wore near-identical masks, with the only difference being that one had a gold pattern, while the other had a silver pattern. They were soon joined by a wrestler known as Platino ("Platinum") to form a trio tag team known as Los Metalicos ("The Metals"). The team was quickly matched up against another trios team, a rudo ("bad guy") trio known as Los Destructores ("The Destroyers"), with whom they had a series of matches. The fans quickly responded to the young team, supporting them and showing appreciation for the fact that Oro had an aerial wrestling style that was unusual for the time and Plata and Platino were skilled high flying wrestlers. Oro's frequent and skilled execution of moves off the top rope helped usher in a style change in lucha libre as wrestlers started to incorporate more moves like planchas and topes, inspired by Oro's performances.

Los Metalicos (Oro and Plata) was given their first professional wrestling championship just over a year after their debut, defeating Los Destructores to win the Mexican National Tag Team Championship on December 4, 1991. The following week, a match between the two teams ended controversially and the championship was vacated, although Los Destructores regained the vacant title shortly after. Los Metalicos also captured the Distrito Federal Trios Championship at some point in 1991, but later lost it to Los Guerreros del Futuro ("The Warriors of the Future"; Damian el Guerrero, Guerrero del Futuro and Guerrero Maya). Oro's popularity earned him an invitation to travel to Japan in 1992, working for Gran Hamada's Universal Lucha Libre promotion, which showcased the lucha libre wrestling style in Japan. His skill and charisma made him an instant hit in Japan, and upon his return, Oro started to break away from the rest of Los Metalicos, being groomed for a top role in EMLL. He even teamed with two of the biggest names in Mexican professional wrestling, working with Mil Máscaras and Último Dragón.

As Oro moved away from Los Metalicos, EMLL replaced him with Bronce ("Bronze"), a wrestling character patterned on Oro's image, but using bronze instead of gold. Oro entered a storyline feud with veteran wrestler Mano Negra ("The Black Hand"), whom he defeated on May 23, 1993, to win the NWA World Middleweight Championship. Mano Negra regained the title three weeks later, on July 3. Originally, EMLL planned to escalate the storyline, which would end with the two wrestlers meeting in a Luchas de Apuestas ("bet match"), where both wrestlers would wager their mask on the outcome. At the time, however, Oro expressed a desire to spend more time with his family and travel less, wanting to retire no later than 1994; as a result, EMLL replaced Oro with Atlantis in the storyline.

== Death and memorial ==
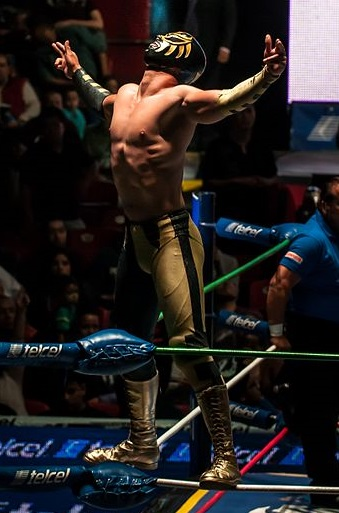
Hernández' nephew who works as Oro Jr. in honor of his uncle.

On October 26, 1993, Oro, Brazo de Plata and La Fiera faced Dr. Wagner Jr., Kahoz and Jaque Mate in a six-man tag team match at Arena Coliseo in Mexico City. Before the match, while going over the plans for it, Oro expressed his desire to take a "Kobashi bump", a reference to a head first backdrop driver which Kenta Kobashi took in a match in All Japan Pro Wrestling (AJPW). That particular bump had a dramatic effect, as it looked like Kobashi had broken his neck and Oro wanted to use the shock effect to help build the drama for their match. During the match, Kahoz clotheslined Oro, who spun and landed on his head as he had planned. His opponent tried to pick him up, but soon thereafter he collapsed and his pulse became weak. Oro was put on a stretcher at the start of the second fall while his brother screamed, "Don't fall asleep!", warning him to remain alert so that he would not lose consciousness. Oro died before being placed in a waiting ambulance, two months short of his 22nd birthday. Oro's family requested that an autopsy not be performed; however, it was believed that he died of a brain aneurysm.

The following day, the news of Oro's death headlined every lucha libre publication in Mexico. EMLL's rival promotion, Asistencia Asesoría y Administración, paid tribute to Oro during their show, something they had rarely done for a worker of their rival promotion. In 1994 and 1995, close to the date of Oro's death, EMLL held a Copa de Oro tournament, a tag team tournament where the winners were presented a trophy by Oro II. The 1994 tournament winners were Apolo Dantés and El Dandy, and the 1995 tournament was won by Chicago Express and Pierroth Jr. Each year, around the anniversary of Jesús Javier Hernández Silva's death, the lucha libre community organizes a religious mass in memory of Jesús Hernández, as well as other major lucha libre names that have died in the previous year. The mass takes place in Arena Coliseo, the arena where Oro died. A number of wrestlers have cited Oro as their inspiration for becoming a wrestler or an inspiration for them adopting a faster, more high-flying, high-risk style by the work he did in the ring.

=== Oro in Lucha Libre ===
Jesús Javier Hernández was such a popular wrestler and in-ring character that the name has been used by a number of other wrestlers over the years.

- Oro II, his brother Ismael Hernández Silva who worked as under the ring name Plata before Oro's death, changed his name in honor of his brother. Only used the name until 1995.
- Oro II (second version), Ismael Hernández Islas, another brother who adopted the name and mask in 1995.
- Orito, a Mini-Estrella version of Oro that was active before Oro's death.
- Oro Jr. (I), Orito moved to the regular sized division and changed his name.
- Oro Jr., son of Ismael Hernández Solís and nephew of the original Oro, who began working for CMLL in late 2011.

== The Hernández wrestling family ==
The Hernández family has been in the professional wrestling business for three generations, starting with the brothers collectively known as Los Hermanos Calavera ("The Skull Brothers"), their six sons and one grandson, who either are or have been professional wrestlers.

Father
Hermano Calavera II	Hermano Calavera I
Oro	Plata	Oro II	Plata II	Calavera, Jr.	Bronce II	Golden
Oro, Jr.

== Championships and accomplishments ==
- Consejo Mundial de Lucha Libre
  - Mexican National Tag Team Championship (1 time) – with Plata
  - NWA World Middleweight Championship (1 time)
- Comisión de Box y Lucha Libre Mexico Distrito Federal
  - Distrito Federal Trios Championship (1 time) – with Plata and Platino
- Pro Wrestling Illustrated
  - PWI ranked him #249 of the 500 best singles wrestlers during the PWI Years in 2003.

== See also ==
- List of premature professional wrestling deaths
