= CMLL Universal Championship (2014) =

Mexican professional wrestling tournament

- Official poster for the finals of the 2014 tournament
- Promotion: Consejo Mundial de Lucha Libre
- Date: August 15, 2014; August 22, 2014; August 29, 2014
- City: Mexico City, Mexico
- Venue: Arena México

Event chronology
← Previous; Reyes del Aire	Next → CMLL 81st Anniversary Show

CMLL Universal Championship tournaments chronology
← Previous; 2013	Next → 2015

The CMLL Universal Championship 2014 (Campeonato Universal in Spanish) was a professional wrestling tournament produced by the Consejo Mundial de Lucha Libre (CMLL) promotion, which took place over three Super Viernes shows between August 15 and 29, 2014, in Arena México, Mexico City, Mexico. The CMLL Universal Championship is an annual tournament of CMLL champions that was first held in 2009 and has been held annually ever since. Being a professional wrestling tournament, it is not won legitimately; it is instead won via predetermined outcomes to the matches that are kept secret from the general public.

== Background ==
The tournament featured 15 professional wrestling matches under single-elimination tournament rules, which means that wrestlers were eliminated when they lost a match. There were no specific storylines that built to the tournament, which has been held annually since 2009. All male "non-regional" CMLL champions at the time of the tournament were involved in the tournament. The CMLL World Mini-Estrella Championship and Mexican National Lightweight Championship are both exclusively for CMLL's Mini-Estrella division and thus not eligible for the tournament. Regionally promoted championships such as the CMLL Arena Coliseo Tag Team Championship and the Occidente championships promoted in Guadalajara, Jalisco were not included in the tournament; only titles that had been defended in CMLL's main venue Arena Mexico were included. The tournament was divided into two qualifying blocks, which took place on August 15 and August 22, while the final took place on August 29, 2014.

== 2014 Universal Championship tournament ==
When CMLL announced the 2014 tournament the following champions were eligible to participate:

Participant	Championship held
Diamante Azul	NWA World Historic Light Heavyweight Championship
Dragón Rojo Jr.	CMLL World Middleweight Championship
Euforia	CMLL World Trios Championship
El Felino	Mexican National Trios Championship
Mephisto	Mexican National Light Heavyweight Championship
Místico	CMLL World Welterweight Championship
Mr. Niebla	Mexican National Trios Championship
Negro Casas	CMLL World Tag Team Championship; Mexican National Trios Championship
Niebla Roja	CMLL World Trios Championship
Rey Escorpión	CMLL World Light Heavyweight Championship
Shocker	CMLL World Tag Team Championship
La Sombra	NWA World Historic Middleweight Championship
El Terrible	CMLL World Heavyweight Championship
Titán	Mexican National Welterweight Championship
Último Guerrero	CMLL World Trios Championship
Virus	CMLL World Lightweight Championship
Volador Jr.	NWA World Historic Welterweight Championship

- Reigning CMLL World Welterweight Champion Místico did not take part in the tournament due to an injury.

Block A

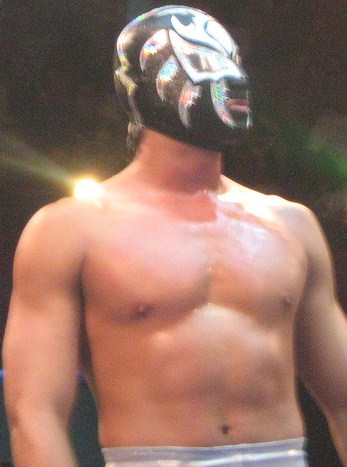
La Sombra, winner of Block A

Block A took place on August 15, 2014, and featured eight champions wrestling for a place in the finals.

Quarterfinals
Euforia	Pin
El Terrible
El Felino	Sub
Shocker
Rey Escorpión	Pin
La Sombra
Mephisto	Sub
Negro Casas

Semifinals
Euforia	Pin
Shocker
La Sombra	Pin
Negro Casas

Finals
Shocker	Pin
La Sombra

Block B

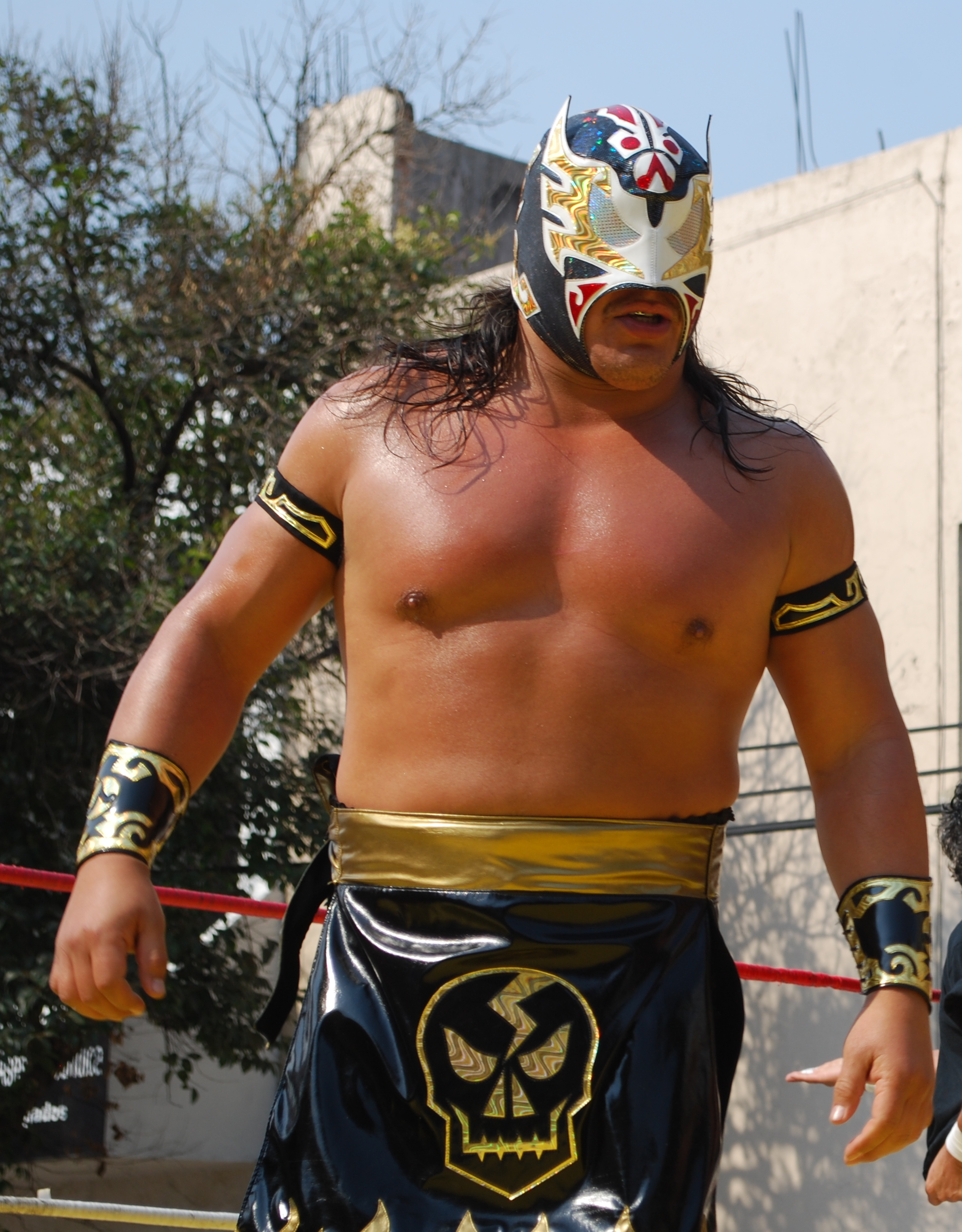
Último Guerrero, the winner of block B and the first ever two-time CMLL Universal Champion

Block B took place on August 22, 2014, and featured eight champions wrestling for a place in the finals.

Quarterfinals
Mr. Niebla	Pin
Último Guerrero
Dragón Rojo Jr.	Sub
Virus
Diamante Azul	Pin
Niebla Roja
Titán	Pin
Volador Jr.

Semifinals
Último Guerrero	Pin
Dragón Rojo Jr.
Diamante Azul	Pin
Volador Jr.

Finals
Último Guerrero	Pin
Volador Jr.

Finals

The finals of the tournament took place on August 29, 2014, and saw the 2009 Universal Champion Último Guerrero defeat the 2011 Universal Champion La Sombra to become the first two-time Universal Champion.
