= CMLL Universal Championship (2013) =

Mexican professional wrestling tournament

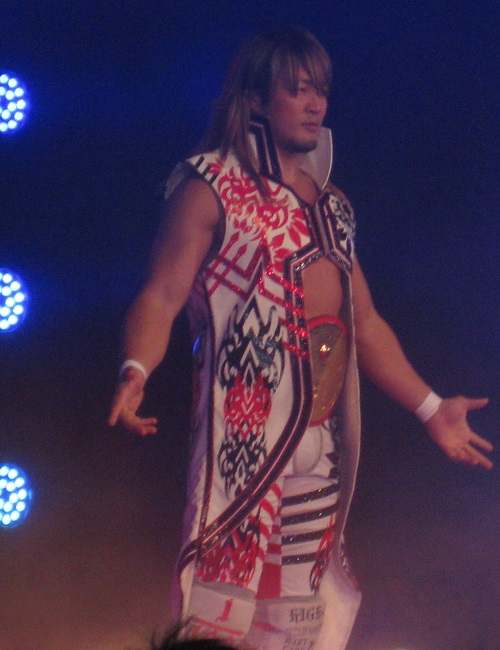
- 2013 Universal Champion, Tanahashi, wearing the title belt
- Promotion: Consejo Mundial de Lucha Libre
- Date: August 23, 2013; August 30, 2013; September 6, 2013
- City: Mexico City, Mexico
- Venue: Arena México

Event chronology
← Previous; Infierno en el Ring	Next → CMLL 80th Anniversary Show

CMLL Universal Championship tournaments chronology
← Previous; 2012	Next → 2014

The CMLL Universal Championship 2013 (Campeonato Universal in Spanish) was a professional wrestling tournament produced by the Consejo Mundial de Lucha Libre (CMLL) promotion, which took place over three shows between August 23 and September 6, 2013, in Arena México, Mexico City, Mexico. The CMLL Universal Championship is an annual tournament of CMLL champions that was first held in 2009.

== Background ==
The tournament featured 15 professional wrestling matches under single-elimination tournament rules, which means that wrestlers were eliminated when they lose a match. There were no specific storylines that build to the tournament, which has been held annually since 2009. All male "non-regional" CMLL champions at the time of the tournament were involved in the tournament with the exception of the reigning CMLL World Mini-Estrella and Mexican National Lightweight Champions, who have never taken part in the tournament. Regionally promoted championships such as the CMLL Arena Coliseo Tag Team Championship and the Occidente championships promoted in Guadalajara, Jalisco were not included in the tournament; only titles that have been defended in CMLL's main venue Arena Mexico were included. The tournament was divided into two qualifying blocks, which took place on August 23 and August 30, while the final took place on September 6, 2013.

== 2013 Universal Championship tournament ==
When CMLL announced the 2013 tournament the following champions were eligible to participate:

Participant	Championship held
Averno	Mexican National Welterweight Championship
Diamante Azul	NWA World Historic Light Heavyweight Championship
Dragón Rojo Jr.	CMLL World Middleweight Championship
Hiroshi Tanahashi	CMLL World Tag Team Championship
Jushin Thunder Liger	CMLL World Tag Team Championship
La Máscara	Mexican National Trios Championship
Máscara Dorada	CMLL World Trios Championship; NWA World Historic Welterweight Championship
Mephisto	Mexican National Light Heavyweight Championship
Místico	CMLL World Trios Championship
Pólvora	CMLL World Welterweight Championship
Rey Escorpión	CMLL World Light Heavyweight Championship
Rush	Mexican National Trios Championship
La Sombra	NWA World Historic Middleweight Championship
El Terrible	CMLL World Heavyweight Championship
Titán	Mexican National Trios Championship
Valiente	CMLL World Trios Championship
Virus	CMLL World Lightweight Championship

- Reigning CMLL World Tag Team Champion Jushin Thunder Liger did not take part in the tournament. For the third year in a row, New Japan Pro-Wrestling representative Hiroshi Tanahashi entered the tournament as an outsider.

Block A

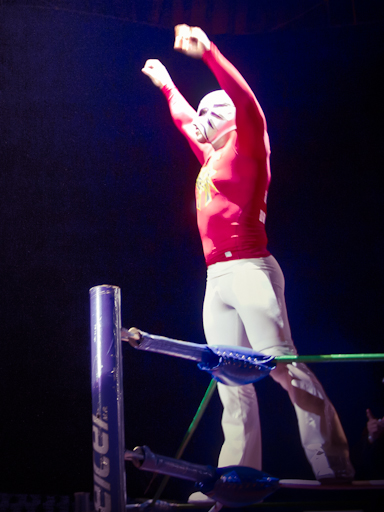
La Máscara, block A participant

Block A took place on August 23, 2013, and featured eight champions wrestling for a place in the finals.

Quarterfinals
Rush	Sub
El Terrible
La Máscara	Sub
Máscara Dorada
Averno
Rey Escorpión	Pin
Pólvora
Místico	Pin

Semifinals
Rush	Pin
La Máscara
Rey Escorpión	Pin
Místico

Finals
Rush	Pin
Rey Escorpión

Block B

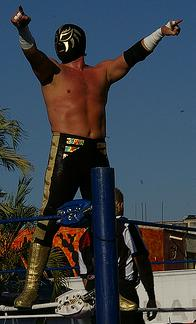
La Sombra, block B participant

Block B took place on August 30, 2013, and featured eight champions wrestling for a place in the finals. Diamante Azul was scheduled to take part in the block, but had to pull out due to an injury and was replaced by CMLL Arena Coliseo Tag Team Champion Okumura.

Quarterfinals
Dragón Rojo Jr.	Pin
Titán
Okumura
Tanahashi	Pin
Mephisto
La Sombra	Pin
Valiente
Virus	Pin

Semifinals
Dragón Rojo Jr.
Tanahashi	Sub
La Sombra	Pin
Virus

Finals
Tanahashi	Pin
La Sombra

Finals

The finals of the tournament took place on September 6, 2013, and saw Tanahashi defeat Rush two falls to one to become the 2013 Universal Champion.
