= CMLL Universal Championship (2012) =

Professional wrestling tournament

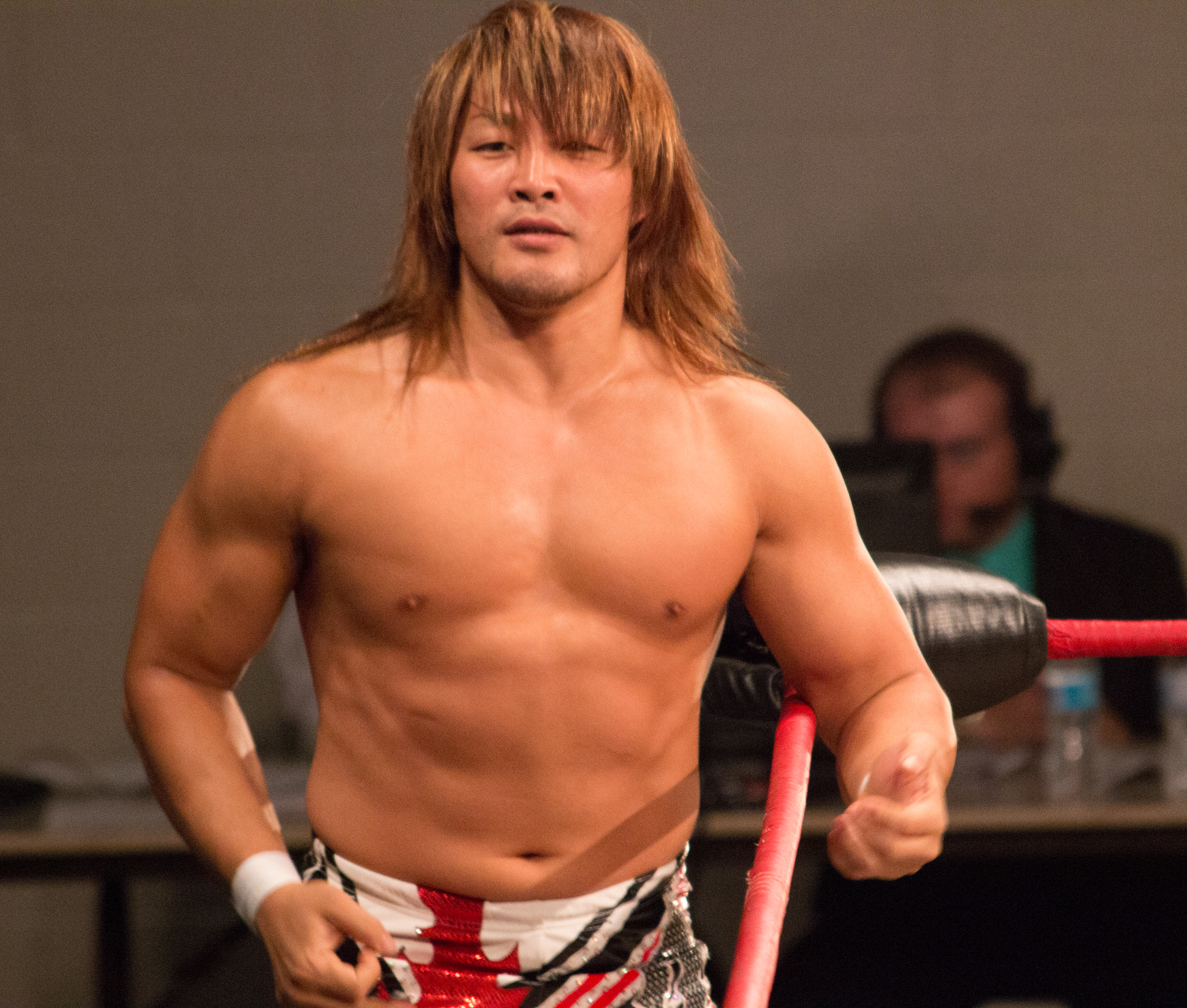
- Hiroshi Tanahashi, defeated in the finals by El Terrible
- Promotion: Consejo Mundial de Lucha Libre
- Date: August 17, 2012; August 24, 2012; August 31, 2012
- City: Mexico City, Mexico
- Venue: Arena México

Event chronology
← Previous; Infierno en el Ring	Next → CMLL 79th Anniversary Show

CMLL Universal Championship tournaments chronology
← Previous; 2011	Next → 2013

The CMLL Universal Championship 2012 (Campeonato Universal in Spanish) was a professional wrestling tournament produced by the Consejo Mundial de Lucha Libre (CMLL) promotion, which took place over three shows between August 17 and August 31, 2012, in Arena México, Mexico City, Mexico. The CMLL Universal Championship is an annual tournament of CMLL Champions that was first held in 2009.

== Background ==
The tournament featured 15 professional wrestling matches under single-elimination tournament rules, which means that wrestlers were eliminated when they lose a match. There were no specific storylines that build to the tournament, which has been held annually since 2009. All male "non-regional" CMLL champions at the time of the tournament were involved in the tournament with the exception of the reigning CMLL World Mini-Estrella and Mexican National Lightweight Champions, who have never taken part in the tournament. Regionally promoted championships such as the CMLL Arena Coliseo Tag Team Championship and the Occidente championships promoted in Guadalajara, Jalisco were not included in the tournament; only titles that have been defended in CMLL's main venue Arena Mexico were included. The tournament was divided into two qualifying blocks, which took place on August 17 and August 24, while the finals took place on August 31, 2012.

== 2012 Universal Championship tournament ==
When CMLL announced the 2012 tournament the following champions were eligible to participate:

Participant	Championship held
Atlantis	CMLL World Tag Team Championship
Black Warrior	Mexican National Trios Championship
Diamante Azul	CMLL World Tag Team Championship
Dragón Rojo Jr.	CMLL World Middleweight Championship
Marco Corleone	CMLL World Trios Championship
La Máscara	Mexican National Light Heavyweight Championship
Máscara Dorada	CMLL World Welterweight Championship
Máximo	CMLL World Trios Championship
Mr. Águila	Mexican National Trios Championship
Negro Casas	NWA World Historic Welterweight Championship
Pólvora	Mexican National Welterweight Championship
Prince Devitt	NWA World Historic Middleweight Championship
Rey Bucanero	NWA World Historic Light Heavyweight Championship
Rush	CMLL World Light Heavyweight Championship; CMLL World Trios Championship
El Terrible	CMLL World Heavyweight Championship
Virus	CMLL World Lightweight Championship
Volador Jr.	Mexican National Trios Championship

- Reigning NWA World Historic Middleweight Champion Prince Devitt and CMLL World Lightweight Champion Virus did not take part in the tournament. For the second year in a row, New Japan Pro-Wrestling representative and reigning IWGP Heavyweight Champion Hiroshi Tanahashi entered the tournament as an outsider.

Block A

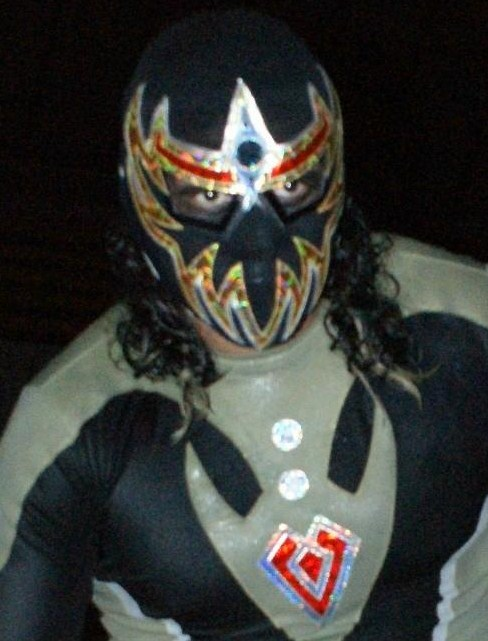
Máscara Dorada, block A participant.

Block A took place on August 17, 2012, and featured eight champions wrestling for a place in the finals.

Quarterfinals
Black Warrior
Máscara Dorada	Pin
El Terrible	Pin
Mr. Águila
Rey Bucanero
Rush	Pin
Atlantis	Pin
Negro Casas

Semifinals
Máscara Dorada
El Terrible	Pin
Rush	Pin
Atlantis

Finals
El Terrible	Pin
Rush

Block B

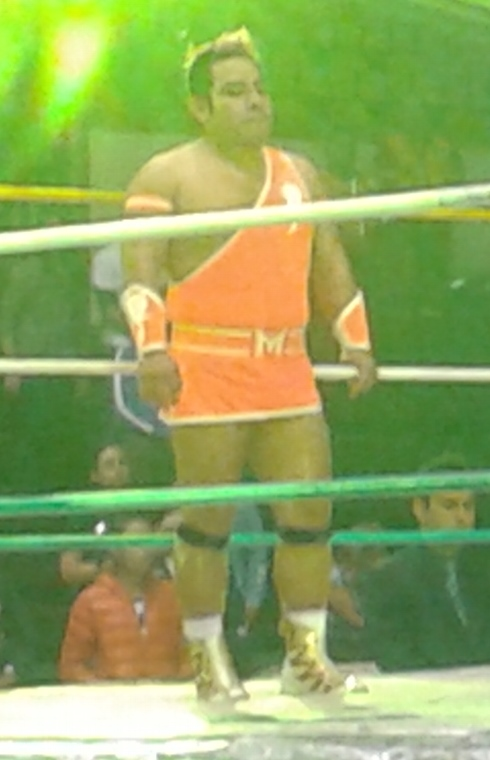
Máximo, block B participant.

Block B took place on August 24, 2012, and featured eight champions wrestling for a place in the finals.

Quarterfinals
Tanahashi	Pin
Marco Corleone
Diamante Azul	Pin
Pólvora
Dragón Rojo Jr.
La Máscara	Pin
Máximo
Volador Jr.	Pin

Semifinals
Tanahashi	Pin
Diamante Azul
La Máscara
Volador Jr.	Pin

Finals
Tanahashi	Pin
Volador Jr.

Finals

The finals of the tournament took place on August 31, 2012, and saw El Terrible defeat Tanahashi two falls to one to become the 2012 Universal Champion.
