= CMLL Universal Championship =

Recurring professional wrestling tournament

- The belt awarded to the tournament winner each year.

Details
- Promotion: Consejo Mundial de Lucha Libre
- Date established: June 22, 2009
- Current champion: Kane
- Date won: November 20, 2026
Statistics
- First champion: Último Guerrero
- Most reigns: Último Guerrero and El Terrible (2 times)
- Oldest champion: Atlantis (53 years, 18 days)
- Youngest champion: La Sombra (22 years, 12 days)
- Heaviest champion: El Terrible (106 kg (234 lb))
- Lightest champion: La Sombra (80 kg (180 lb))

The CMLL Universal Championship (Campeonato Universal in Spanish) is an annual lucha libre tournament held by the Mexican professional wrestling promotion Consejo Mundial de Lucha Libre (CMLL) since 2009. The tournament format is a "tournament of champions" with sixteen male CMLL champions participating. With the 2019 tournament CMLL has held nine tournaments in total with only two repeat winners, Último Guerrero who won in both 2009 and 2014 and El Terrible who won in 2012 and 2019.

Even though the tournament winner is given a title belt, it is not defended like a regular championship throughout the year.

== Male tournament winners ==
Year	Winner	Championship held	Date	Ref(s)
2009	Último Guerrero	CMLL World Heavyweight Championship	June 22, 2009	
2010	Jushin Thunder Liger	CMLL World Middleweight Championship	August 13, 2010	
2011	La Sombra	NWA World Historic Welterweight Championship	September 16, 2011	
2012	El Terrible	CMLL World Heavyweight Championship	August 31, 2012	
2013	Tanahashi	CMLL World Tag Team Championship	September 6, 2013	
2014	Último Guerrero (2)	CMLL World Trios Championship	August 29, 2014	
2015	Atlantis	Mexican National Light Heavyweight Championship	October 16, 2015	
2016	Valiente	CMLL World Trios Championship	October 28, 2016	
2017	Volador Jr.	NWA World Historic Welterweight Championship; CMLL World Trios Championship	July 14, 2017	
2019	El Terrible (2)	Mexican National Heavyweight Championship	February 15, 2019	
2022	Místico	NWA World Historic Middleweight Championship	April 29, 2022	
2023	Dragón Rojo Jr.	CMLL World Middleweight Championship	April 28, 2023	
2024	Máscara Dorada 2.0	NWA World Historic Welterweight Championship	April 26, 2024	
2025	Titán	CMLL World Welterweight Championship	April 25, 2025	
2026	Máscara Dorada (2)	NWA World Historic Welterweight Championship	April 24, 2026	

== Female tournament winners ==
CMLL Universal Amazons Championship
- The belt awarded to the tournament winner each year.

Details
- Promotion: Consejo Mundial de Lucha Libre
- Date established: Summer 2019
- Current champion: Persephone
- Date won: October 20, 2023
Statistics
- First champion: Dalys la Caribeña
- Most reigns: Dalys la Caribeña (1 time)

Year	Winner	Date	Ref(s)
2019	Dalys la Caribeña	August 16, 2019	
2021	La Jarochita	August 27, 2021	
2022	Lluvia	October 21, 2022	
2023	La Catalina	October 20, 2023	
2024	Persephone	October 18, 2024	
2025	India Sioux	October 17, 2025	
2026	Olympia	October 16, 2026	

== Tournament history ==
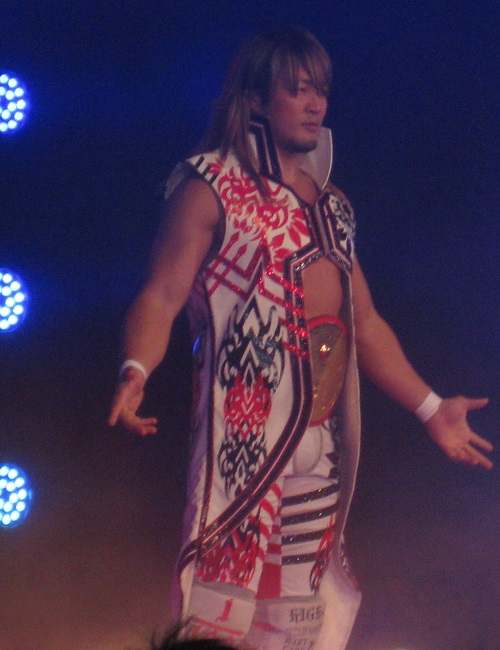
The 2013 Universal Champion Tanahashi wearing the championship belt

The Universal Championship tournament was created in 2009 to replace the Leyenda de Plata as CMLL's top tournament of the year. The Leyenda de Plata commemorated El Santo, a legend in lucha libre, but when CMLL and El Santo's son, El Hijo del Santo had a very public falling out in 2008 they decided to no longer run the annual Leyenda de Plata tournament. They came up with the concept of the Universal Championship tournament, a tournament exclusively for CMLL champions. The first Universal Championship tournament took place over three shows in June, with June 5, 2009, and June 12, 2009 CMLL Super Viernes shows each hosting a three-round block of the tournament and the June 19, 2009 Super Viernes featuring the finals as its main event. On June 19, 2009 CMLL World Heavyweight Champion, and one of the tournament favorites, Último Guerrero defeated El Texano Jr. the reigning NWA World Light Heavyweight Champion. CMLL later announced the 2010 Universal Championship, confirming that it will indeed be an annual event. The second annual Universal Championship tournament started on July 30, 2010, ended on August 13 and saw New Japan Pro-Wrestling representative and CMLL World Middleweight Champion Jushin Thunder Liger defeat CMLL World Trios Champion La Sombra to become the 2010 Universal Champion. The 2011 edition started on September 2, ended on September 16 and saw La Sombra, now the NWA World Historic Welterweight Champion, come back to defeat CMLL World Trios Champion Averno in the finals to win the tournament. In 2012, CMLL World Heavyweight Champion El Terrible defeated New Japan Pro Wrestling's IWGP Heavyweight Champion Tanahashi to win the tournament. The following year, Tanahashi, now the CMLL World Tag Team Champion, became the second Japanese winner of the tournament by defeating Mexican National Trios Champion Rush in the finals. In 2014, CMLL World Trios Champion and the 2009 Universal Champion Último Guerrero defeated the NWA World Historic Middleweight Champion and 2011 Universal Champion La Sombra to become the first two-time Universal Champion.

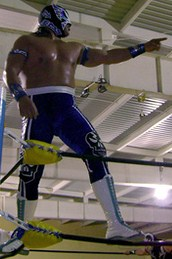
Último Guerrero, the first two-time champion (in 2009 and 2014)

40 individuals have competed in the six tournaments that have been held up to and including the 2014 Universal Championship tournament, with 13 wrestlers having appeared at only 1 tournament so far. Dragón Rojo Jr., La Máscara, La Sombra, Máscara Dorada and Mephisto have all participated in five of the six tournaments held so far. Diamante Azul previously competed in the tournament as "Metro" and is the only wrestler to compete under two different ring identities. Only one non-CMLL champion has participated in the tournament, Hiroshi Tanahashi, who held the IWGP Heavyweight Championship when he participated in 2012 and 2013, but held the CMLL World Tag Team Championship when participating in 2011. Despite holding the CMLL World Lightweight Championship Virus did not compete in the 2011 and 2012 tournaments but did participate in 2013 and 2014. Jushin Thunder Liger won the tournament in 2010 but did not compete in 2011 or 2012 despite holding CMLL championships at the time, the CMLL World Middleweight Championship and the CMLL World Tag Team Championship respectively. Prince Devitt did not participate in the 2012 tournament despite holding the NWA World Historic Middleweight Championship as he was in Japan at the time. Místico the holder of the CMLL World Welterweight Championship was unable to participate in the 2014 tournament due to an injury.
