= CMLL 80th Anniversary Show =

Mexican professional wrestling supercard show

CMLL 80th Anniversary show
- The official poster for the show advertising all six matches
- Promotion: Consejo Mundial de Lucha Libre
- Date: September 13, 2013
- City: Mexico City, Mexico
- Venue: Arena México

Event chronology
← Previous; Universal Championship Tournament	Next → Leyenda de Plata

CMLL Anniversary Shows chronology
← Previous; 79th Anniversary	Next → 81st Anniversary

The CMLL 80th Anniversary Show (Spanish: 80. Aniversario de CMLL) was a professional wrestling event produced by Consejo Mundial de Lucha Libre (CMLL) that took place on September 13, 2013, in CMLL's home arena Arena México in Mexico City, Mexico. The event commemorated the 80th anniversary of CMLL, the oldest professional wrestling promotion in the world. CMLL's anniversary show is their biggest, most important show of the year, comparable to the Super Bowl for the National Football League or WrestleMania for WWE. The CMLL Anniversary Show series is the longest-running annual professional wrestling show, starting in 1934.

For the show CMLL decided to combine two of their biggest, longest-running storyline feuds as they booked a Relevos Suicidas (Spanish for "Suicide Relay") match for the show. In a Relevos Suicidas two tag teams wrestle each other and as a result of the match one team is then forced to fight against each other under Lucha de Apuestas, or "Bet match", rules. Traditionally the losing team would be forced to wrestle for their masks as a "punishment" for losing the match, but for this show CMLL changed it so that the winning team would win the right to fight for their masks, playing off the fact that the two teams actually wanted to fight their partner in a Lucha de Apuesta match. Volador Jr. and La Sombra made up one team, former friends turned bitter rivals who were in the middle of a several-year long feud. On the other side was Atlantis and Último Guerrero, again former partners and friends who were also involved in a multiple-year spanning feud.

The show featured an additional Lucha de Apuestas match, but for the match both Blue Panther and Averno would "bet" their hair on the outcome of the match since both were unmasked. CMLL also booked a CMLL World Trios Championship match with reigning champions Los Estetas del Aire ("The Air Esthetics"; Máscara Dorada, Místico and Valiente) defending against a team known as Los Revolucionarios del Terror ("The Terror Revolutionaries"; Dragón Rojo, Jr., Pólvora and Rey Escorpión). Three additional matches rounded out the show.

== Production ==
=== Background ===
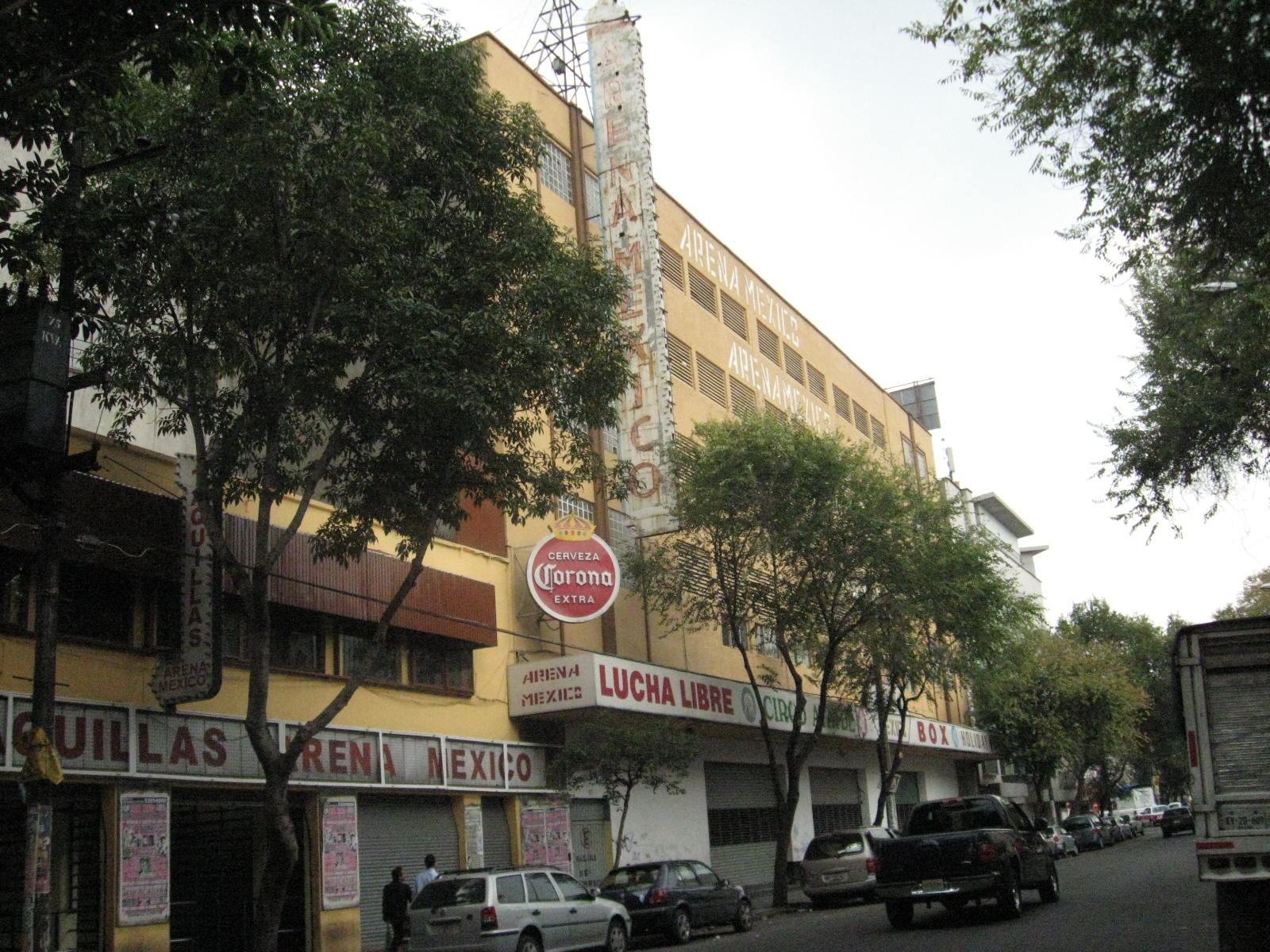
Arena México, CMLL's main venue and location of the Anniversary Show

The Mexican Lucha libre (professional wrestling) company Consejo Mundial de Lucha Libre (CMLL) started out under the name Empresa Mexicana de Lucha Libre ("Mexican Wrestling Company"; EMLL), founded by Salvador Lutteroth in 1933. Lutteroth, inspired by professional wrestling shows he had attended in Texas, decided to become a wrestling promoter and held his first show on September 21, 1933, marking what would be the beginning of organized professional wrestling in Mexico. Lutteroth would later become known as "the father of Lucha Libre" . A year later EMLL held the EMLL 1st Anniversary Show, starting the annual tradition of the Consejo Mundial de Lucha Libre Anniversary Shows that have been held each year ever since, most commonly in September.

Over the years the anniversary show would become the biggest show of the year for CMLL, akin to the Super Bowl for the National Football League (NFL) or WWE's WrestleMania event. The first anniversary show was held in Arena Modelo, which Lutteroth had bought after starting EMLL. In 1942–43 Lutteroth financed the construction of Arena Coliseo, which opened in April 1943. The EMLL 10th Anniversary Show was the first of the anniversary shows to be held in Arena Coliseo. In 1956 Lutteroth had Arena México built in the location of the original Arena Modelo, making Arena México the main venue of EMLL from that point on. Starting with the EMLL 23rd Anniversary Show, all anniversary shows except for the EMLL 46th Anniversary Show have been held in the arena that would become known as "The Cathedral of Lucha Libre". On occasion EMLL held more than one show labelled as their "Anniversary" show, such as two 33rd Anniversary Shows in 1966. Over time the anniversary show series became the oldest, longest-running annual professional wrestling show. In comparison, WWE's WrestleMania is only the fourth oldest still promoted show (CMLL's Arena Coliseo Anniversary Show and Arena México anniversary shows being second and third). EMLL was supposed to hold the EMLL 52nd Anniversary Show on September 20, 1985 but Mexico City was hit by a magnitude 8.0 earthquake. EMLL canceled the event both because of the general devastation but also over fears that Arena México might not be structurally sound after the earthquake.

When Jim Crockett Promotions was bought by Ted Turner in 1988 EMLL became the oldest still active promotion in the world. In 1991 EMLL was rebranded as "Consejo Mundial de Lucha Libre" and thus held the CMLL 59th Anniversary Show, the first under the new name, on September 18, 1992. Traditionally CMLL holds their major events on Friday Nights, replacing their regularly scheduled Super Viernes show.

=== Storylines ===
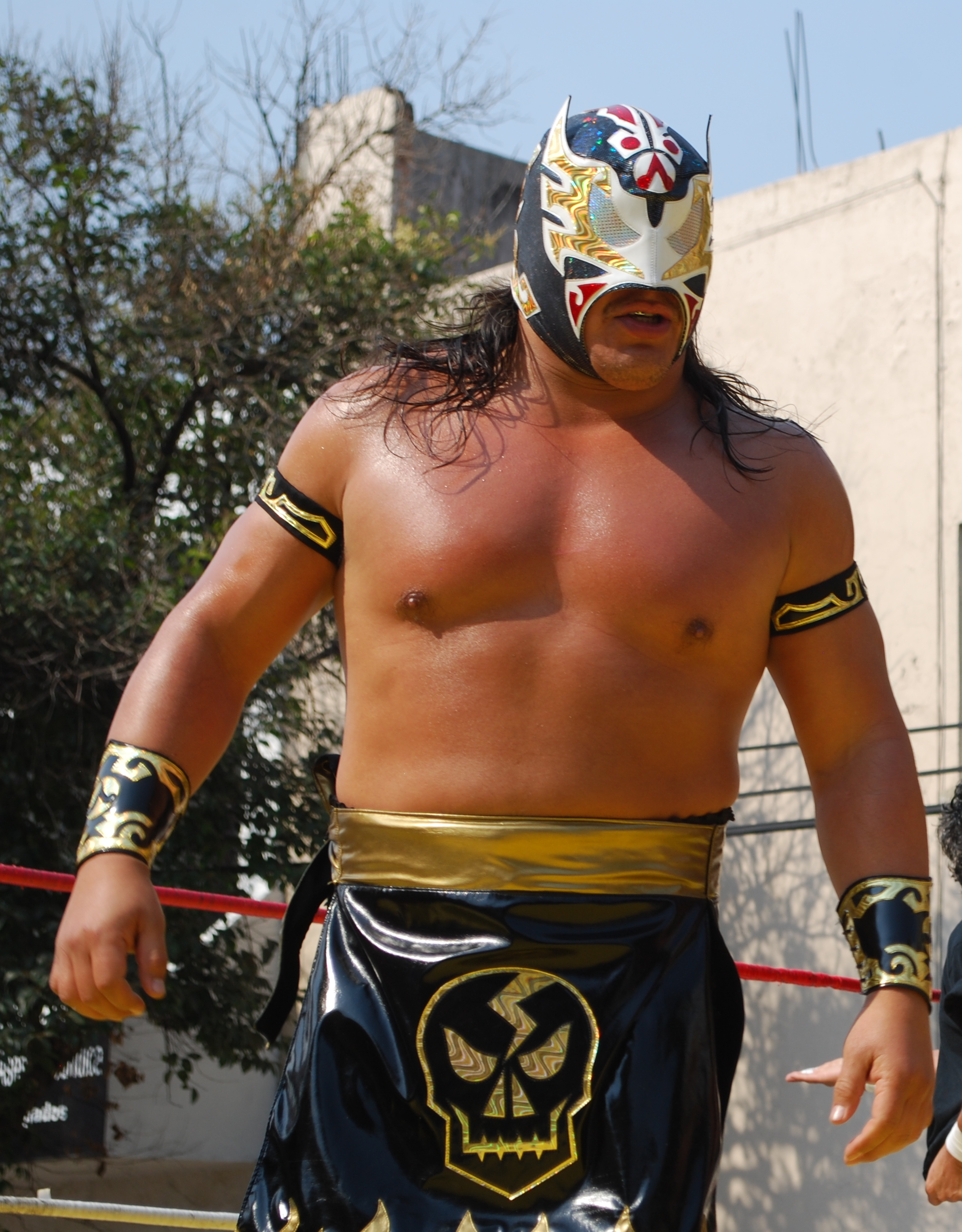
Último Guerrero, one of the participants in CMLL's biggest storyline of the year

The event featured seven professional wrestling matches with different wrestlers involved in pre-existing scripted feuds, plots and storylines. Wrestlers were portrayed as either heels (referred to as rudos in Mexico, those that portray the "bad guys") or faces (técnicos in Mexico, the "good guy" characters) as they followed a series of tension-building events, which culminated in a wrestling match or series of matches.

In the weeks following the CMLL 79th Anniversary Show, CMLL began talking about el camino de 80 Aniversario, or "The road to the 80th Anniversary", making it clear that they were intending to make build to the 80th Anniversary show a priority in the year leading up to the show. During a CMLL press conference on March 21, 2013 long time rivals Atlantis and Último Guerrero talked about their rivalry and then proceeded to sign a match for a Lucha de Apuestas but with no specific date mentioned. A Luchas de Apuestas, or bet match, is the most prestigious match form in Lucha Libre and means that the participants put their wrestling mask on the line and the loser will be forced to remove it after the match and never wrestle wearing it again. The act of signing a Luchas de Apuestas match between two of the top ranked CMLL workers without announcing a specific date has let people to speculate that it would take place at the 80th Anniversary show. CMLL officials explained that due to various prior commitment both in Mexico and in Japan and the United States they were not sure when the Lucha de Apuestas match could take place, but they wanted to get the contract signed first and then figure out the schedule. The two rivals found themselves on opposite sides in the semi-finals of the 2013 Gran Alternativa tournament. The tournament saw Atlantis team up with rookie Hombre Bala Jr. while Último Guerrero teamed up with Guerrero Negro, Jr. After both teams won their first two matches the semi-finals saw Atlantis and Hombre Bala Jr. defeat the two Guerreros to earn a spot in the finals of the tournament. In the week following his tournament victory Atlantis was quoted as saying that "Último Guerrero would look good in my trophy case". During the celebration of Atlantis' 30th anniversary as a wrestler Guerrero appeared after a match to berate Atlantis, which turned out to only be a distraction for the real Último Guerrero to attack Atlantis from behind. The two identically dressed Guerreros proceeded to beat up Atlantis and tear his mask apart. Following the match Último Guerrero introduced his brother "Gran Guerrero".

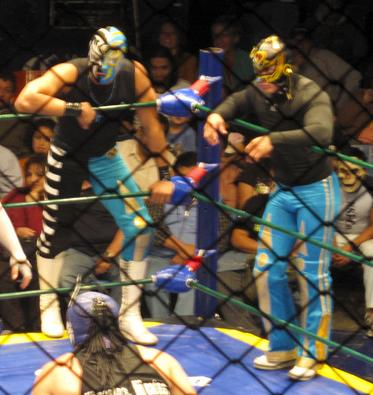
The team of La Sombra (left) and Volador Jr. (right) during a match, while they were still friends and tag team partners.

Volador Jr. and La Sombra, two of CMLL's top tecnico wrestlers had been friends and regular tag team partners for years. On January 16, 2009, La Sombra and Volador Jr., dubbed "Super Sky Team" defeated Averno and Mephisto to win the CMLL World Tag Team Championship The dupo would defend the tag team championship eight times through 2009 and 2010. Their teamwork led to them being named the "CMLL Tag Team of the year" for 2009 by the fans of CMLL. In 2010 Volador Jr. became involved in a storyline feud against Místico, who had turned rudo for the first time in his career early in 2010. At the same time La Sombra was working a separate storyline with El Felino.On the February 26 CMLL Super Viernes show it was announced that Místico, Volador Jr., La Sombra and El Felino would face off in a four-way Lucha de Apuesta match as the main event of the 2010 Homenaje a Dos Leyendas. La Sombra was the first man pinned at Dos Leyendas and El Felino was the second, forcing the two to put their masks on the line. After a long match La Sombra pinned El Felino. After the match he unmasked and announced that his real name was Jorge Luis Casas Ruiz. Following Dos Leyendas Místico announced that he was done being a rúdo and returned to the técnico side, although Volador Jr. kept suspicious of Místico. The storyline between the two cooled off for a bit, but in late May, 2010 tension resumed as Místico and Volador Jr. faced off once again over the Mexican Light Heavyweight Championship, with Volador Jr. retaining the belt. At the 2010 Sin Salida the two were on opposite sides of a Relevos incredibles, Místico teamed with Máscara Dorada and Mr. Águila while Volador Jr. teamed with Averno and Negro Casas. Averno came to the ring wearing the same combined Averno/Místico mask he had worn for the Parejas Incredibles tournament and tried to convince Místico to join the rúdo side, only to turn around and reveal that both he and Volador Jr. were wearing a combined Averno/Volador Jr. mask underneath. Volador Jr. worked as a rúdo throughout the match, losing the match for his team when he tried to cheat but was caught by the referee. Volador Jr,'s status as a rudo was cemented at a later show where he attacked his tag team partner La Sombra, tearing La Sombra's mask off in the process. Following the Super Viernes on August 13, 2010 where he attacked La Máscara Volador Jr. began being booked as rudo, although the on again, off again feud with Místico was put to the side in favor of Volador Jr. facing off against La Sombra. The feud between the two led both wrestlers to be booked in the main event of the CMLL 77th Anniversary Show, a 14-man steel cage Lucha de Apuesta, mask vs. mask match. Volador Jr. was the 10th man to leave the steel cage, keeping his mask safe. The match came down to La Sombra pinning Olímpico to unmask him. On September 18, Volador Jr. unsuccessfully challenged former partner La Sombra for the NWA World Historic Welterweight Championship, in a match, which received rave reviews.

On January 21 and 22, 2012, Volador Jr. took part in the CMLL and New Japan Pro-Wrestling (NJPW) co-produced Fantastica Mania 2012 events in Tokyo. In the main event of the second night, Volador Jr. unsuccessfully challenged La Sombra for the NWA World Historic Welterweight Championship. Later on in 2012 Volador Jr. and La Sombra were forced to team up for the 2013 Torneo Nacional de Parejas Increibles tournament, the same tournament that in 2010 was the impetus for Volador Jr.'s rudo turn. The rivals put their issues aside for the tournament defeating the teams of Guerrero Maya, Jr. and Negro Casas, La Máscara and Averno and finally Shocker and Mr. Niebla to qualify for the finals of the tournament. On March 15, 2013, at the 2013 Homenaje a Dos Leyendas show, Volador Jr. and La Sombra defeated Atlantis and Último Guerrero to win the Torneo Nacional de Parejas Increibles. The truce between La Sombra and Volador Jr. that allowed them to win the tag team tournament only lasted until the next time the two rivals were in the same ring. On Sunday February 17, 2013 La Sombra teamed up with Marco Corleone and Místico La Nueva Era against Volador Jr. Euforia and Último Guerrero. During the match Volador Jr. attacked both La Sombra and the referee, causing a disqualification before leaving the ring and his confused partners behind.

On August 2, it was announced that at the 80th Anniversary Show, Atlantis and Guerrero would team up against two other rivals, La Sombra and Volador Jr., in a Relevos Suicidas match, with the winning team advancing to the Mask vs. Mask match in the main event of the show.

== Event ==
After a build-up that lasted most of 2013, CMLL decided not to actually book Atlantis and Último Guerrero in the Mask vs. Mask main event match as they were defeated by La Sombra and Volador Jr. in the Relevos Suicidas portion of the challenge. Fans in attendance were vocal about their displeasure over the bait-and-switch move with chants of "fraude" for the rest of the event, especially when La Sombra and Volador Jr. faced off. The main event saw La Sombra defeat Volador Jr., forcing his longtime rival to unmask, revealing his real name as Ramón Ibarra Rivera.

== Aftermath ==
During the main event of the show fans started to get behind Volador Jr. cheering him on while turning on La Sombra in the process. The fan reaction kept being positive for Volador Jr. in the weeks and months after his unmasking. On November 23, 2013 Volador Jr. began showing signs of a tecnico turn by shaking hands with his opponent Místico and later on tried to save him from an attack by Los Guerreros Laguneros, before walking out on his Los Invasores partners after the match. His turn was finalized on November 29, when Los Invasores attacked him following a torneo cibernetico elimination match between Los Invasores and representatives of CMLL. In January 2014, Volador Jr. and La Sombra both returned to Japan to take part in the Fantastica Mania 2014 tour. As part of the tour one show was headlined by the first direct singles match between Volador Jr. and La Sombra, after Volador Jr.'s tecnico turn. The match ended in a ten-minute time limit draw.

While Volador Jr. enjoyed the backing of the fans La Sombra, who up until that point had been a crowd favorite, suffered a backlash from CMLL's decision to tease the Atlantis/Último Guerrero but never deliver it. La Sombra began teaming with Rush, another tecnico that was often disliked by the fans, especially after his own Lucha de Apuestas victory at the CMLL 79th Anniversary Show over El Terrible. La Sombra, Rush and La Máscara became a regular team, which were booked as tecnicos but would often be booed more than their rudo opponents. Though the three effectively became rudos, with CMLL dubbing Rush and La Sombra in particular as the two most hated men in the promotion's recent history, they refused to acknowledge themselves as such, instead calling themselves "técnicos diferentes". The trio was originally dubbed Los Indeseables ("The Undesirables"), before being renamed Los Ingobernables ("The Ungovernables"). On June 6, Volador Jr. lost the NWA World Historic Light Heavyweight Championship to La Sombra in a match where La Sombra's NWA World Historic Middleweight Championship was also at stake. The loss came as a result of outside interference from La Máscara and Rush. Volador Jr. regained the title from La Sombra on August 1, 2014 at El Juicio Final. By July 2015 the La Sombra/Volador Jr. storyline was still going strong, often featuring Volador Jr. and various partners facing off against La Sombra and other Ingobernables, including new member Marco Corleone. At the 2015 Sin Salida ("No Escape") show La Sombra, Rush and Corleone defeated Volador Jr., Diamante Azul and Atlantis, after which Volador Jr. challenged La Sombra to another Luchas de Apuestas match, an offer that was flatly refused. Diamante Azul then added to the challenge, suggesting Volador Jr. and Azul face Rush and La Sombra, with each team betting their hair and mask on the outcome of the match. The challenge was not immediately accepted by Los Ingobernables.

The other half of the Relevos Suicidas storyline would continue after the Anniversary show as the two rivals did not get any resolution to their issues at that point in time, being an ongoing storyline in the months following the show. On June 20, 2014 Atlantis won the 2014 Leyenda de Azul, scoring the last elimination over Último Guerrero. During the semi-final match of the 2014 Juicio Final show Atlantis and Último Guerrero were once again on opposite sides of the six-man tag team match. In the first fall Guerrero pulled Atlantis' mask and pinned him, when Atlantis tried to use the same tactics in the second fall he was disqualified and lost the match for his team. Following the match Guerrero insisted on CMLL officially announcing the match between the two. Moments later Juan Manual Mar, representing the CMLL executive team came to the ring and announced that the two would finally face off in a Lucha de Apuestas match for their masks at the 81st Anniversary show. In the lead up to the Anniversary show, Guerrero defeated La Sombra in the finals to win the 2014 Universal Championship, becoming the first two-time winner of the tournament. In the end Atlantis defeated Guerrero, who was then forced to unmask and reveal his real name, José Gutiérrez Hernández, as per Lucha Libre traditions.

Los Estetas del Aire (Máscara Dorada, Místico and Valiente) would remain CMLL World Trios Champions until March 28, 2014 where they lost the championship to Los Guerreros Laguneros
(Euforia, Niebla Roja and Último Guerrero). It was later announced that Máscara Dorada had signed a contract with NJPW for a year and would work regularly in Japan from that point on, breaking up Los Estetas del Aire at least for the time being. In early 2015 Místico and Valiente teamed up with Volador Jr. to form a new trio known as "Sky Team", which won the Trios Championship from Los Guerreros on February 21, 2015.

The Lucha de Apuesta between Averno and Blue Panther marked the end of the storyline between the two wrestlers, with Averno leaving CMLL to join rival promotion AAA on May 17, 2014.

== Results ==
No.	Results	Stipulations	Times
1	La Fiebre Amarilla (Namajague and Okumura) and Ishii defeated Fuego, Rey Cometa and Stuka, Jr.	Best two-out-of-three falls six-man "Lucha Libre rules" tag team match	—
2	Los Guerreros Laguneros (Euforia and Niebla Roja) and Mephisto defeated Brazo de Plata, Máximo and Titán	Best two-out-of-three falls six-man "Lucha Libre rules" tag team match	15:28
3	Marco Corleone, Rush and Vangelis defeated Negro Casas, Shoocker and El Terrible	Best two-out-of-three falls Relevos Increibles match	09:05
4	Averno defeated Blue Panther	Best two-out-of-three falls match Lucha de Apuestas submission only, hair vs. hair match	19:13
5	La Sombra and Volador Jr. defeated Atlantis and Último Guerrero	Relevos Suicidas, winners advance tag team match	05:33
6	Los Estetas del Aire (Máscara Dorada, Místico and Valiente) (c) defeated Los Revolucionarios del Terror (Dragón Rojo, Jr., Pólvora and Rey Escorpión)	Best two-out-of-three falls six-man tag team match for the CMLL World Trios Championship	—
7	La Sombra defeated Volador Jr.	Best two-out-of-three falls Lucha de Apuestas, mask vs. mask match	25:32
(c) / – the champion(s) heading into the match
