= CMLL Universal Championship (2009) =

Mexican professional wrestling tournament

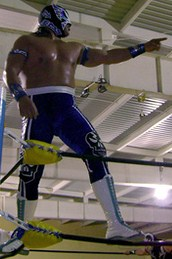
- Último Guerrero the first CMLL Universal Champion.
- Promotion: Consejo Mundial de Lucha Libre
- Date: June 5, 2009; June 12, 2009; June 19, 2009
- City: Mexico City, Mexico
- Venue: Arena México

Event chronology
← Previous; 53. Aniversario de Arena México	Next → Infierno en el Ring

CMLL Universal Championship tournaments chronology
← Previous; First	Next → 2010

The CMLL Universal Championship 2009 (Campeonato Universal in Spanish) was a professional wrestling annual tournament produced by Consejo Mundial de Lucha Libre (CMLL) that took place over three CMLL Super Viernes shows between June 5, 2009 and June 19, 2009 in Arena México, Mexico City, Mexico. The CMLL Universal Championship is an annual tournament of CMLL Champions that was first held in 2009. All officially recognized male CMLL Champions participated in a 15-match single elimination tournament. In the final CMLL World Heavyweight Champion Último Guerrero defeated NWA World Light Heavyweight Champion El Texano Jr. to become the first CMLL Universal Champion.

== Background ==
The tournament featured 15 professional wrestling matches under single elimination rules, which means that wrestlers were eliminated when they lose a match. There were no specific storylines that build to the tournament, rather it was a replacement for CMLL's annual Leyenda de Plata that CMLL last held in 2008. All male "non-regional" CMLL Champions at the time of the tournament were involved in the tournament with the exception of the reigning CMLL World Mini-Estrella and Mexican National Lightweight Champions. CMLL promoted championships such as the regional CMLL Arena Coliseo Tag Team Championship or the Occidente championships promoted in Guadalajara, Jalisco were not included in the tournament, only titles that have been defended in CMLL's main venue Arena Mexico were included. The tournament was divided into two qualifying blocks, which took place on the June 5, 2009 Super Viernes and the June 12, 2009 Super Viernes while the finals was the main event of the June 19, 2009 Super Viernes.

== 2009 Universal Championship tournament ==
=== Block A ===
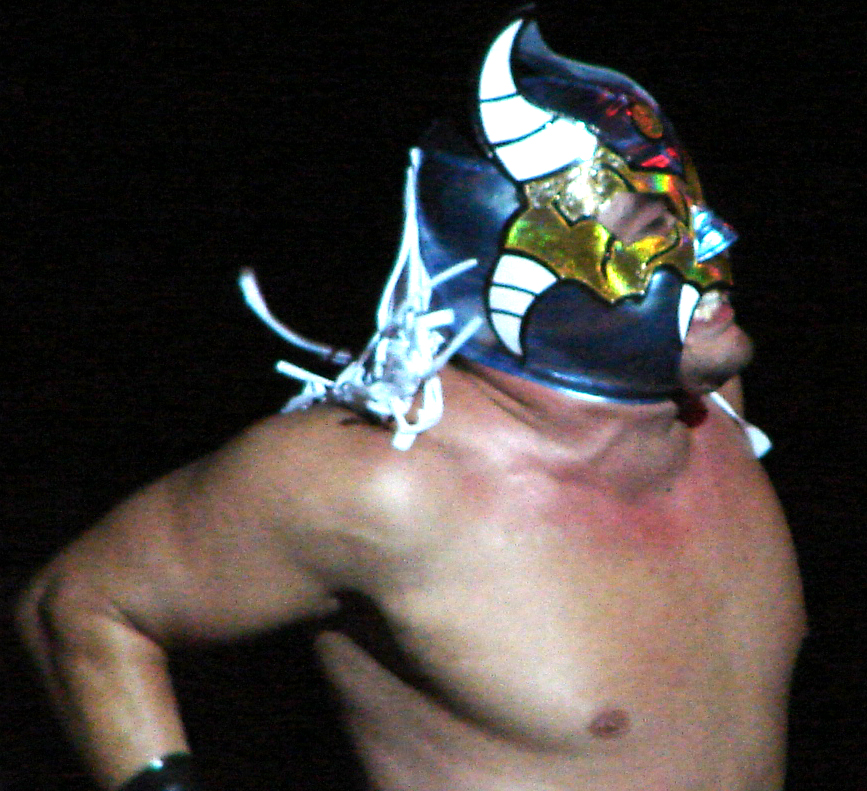
Averno, block A participant.

Block A competed on the June 5, 2009 Super Viernes with the winner advancing to the finals on June 19, 2009. Champions in the first round were.

Participant	Championship held
Black Warrior	Mexican National Trios Championship
Máscara Dorada	CMLL World Super Lightweight Championship
El Hijo del Fantasma	CMLL World Trios Championship
El Texano Jr.	NWA World Light Heavyweight Championship
Averno	NWA World Middleweight Championship; CMLL World Middleweight Championship
Dragón Rojo Jr.	Mexican National Trios Championship
La Sombra	CMLL World Tag Team Championship
Sangre Azteca	Mexican National Trios Championship; Mexican National Welterweight Championship

Block A

Quarterfinals
Black Warrior	Winner
Máscara Dorada
El Hijo del Fantasma
El Texano Jr.	Winner
Averno	Winner
Dragón Rojo Jr.
La Sombra	Winner
Sangre Azteca

Semifinals
Black Warrior
El Texano Jr.	Winner
Averno
La Sombra	Winner

Finals
El Texano Jr.	Winner
La Sombra

=== Block B ===
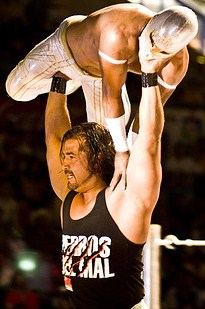
Héctor Garza (bottom) and Místico, both block B participant.

Block B competed on the June 12, 2009 Super Viernes with the winner advancing to the finals on June 19, 2009. Champions in the first round were.

Participant	Championship held
Héctor Garza	CMLL World Trios Championship
Mephisto	NWA World Welterweight Championship
Místico	Mexican National Light Heavyweight Championship
Ephesto	CMLL World Light Heavyweight Championship
Volador Jr.	CMLL World Tag Team Championship
Último Guerrero	CMLL World Heavyweight Championship
La Máscara	CMLL World Trios Championship
Negro Casas	CMLL World Welterweight Championship

Block B

Quarterfinals
Héctor Garza	Winner
Mephisto
Místico	Winner
Ephesto
Volador Jr.
Último Guerrero	Winner
La Máscara
Negro Casas	Winner

Semifinals
Héctor Garza
Místico	Winner
Último Guerrero	Winner
Negro Casas

Finals
Místico
Último Guerrero	Winner

=== Finals ===
The finals was contested under "best two out of three falls" rules and was the main event of the June 19, 2009 Super Viernes show. Último Guerrero defeated El Texano Jr. two falls to one to become the first ever Universal Champion.

== Aftermath ==
Like its predecessor the Leyenda de Plata tournament, the Universal Championship tournament trophy (in this case an actual championship belt) was not defended in the following year.
