= CMLL World Lightweight Championship =

Professional wrestling championship

- The championship belt, still reads as the "CMLL Japan Super Lightweight Championship"

Details
- Promotion: Consejo Mundial de Lucha Libre
- Date established: February 27, 1999 (Note: Duncan and Will (2000), p. 388: "Masato Yakushiji 1999/02/27 Nagoya, JPN Defeats Rencor Latino to become first champion.") (Note: MedioTiempo (June 6, 2011): "Desde entonces han existido once monarcas, siendo el último de ellos Máscara Dorada, quien lo obtuvo el 07 de abril de 2009 en otro torneo cibernético venciendo en la Final al Ángel Azteca Jr." ("Since then there have been eleven champions, the last being Máscara Dorada, who won it on April 7, 2009 in another cibernetico tournament defeating Ángel Azteca Jr. in the finals"))
- Current champion: Calavera Jr. I
- Date won: November 16, 2026

Other names
- CMLL Japan Super Lightweight Championship (1999 - 2000) (Note: Wrestling Title histories p 388 chapter name "CMLL Japan Super Lightweight Championship"); CMLL World Super Lightweight Championship (2003 - 2012)
Statistics
- First champion: Masato Yakushiji
- Most reigns: Virus (4 reigns)
- Longest reign: Stigma (1,707 days)
- Shortest reign: Ricky Marvin (between 1 day and 32 days) (Note: The exact date CMLL stopped promoting the championship has not been verified, which means the title reign lasted between 1 day and 32 days.)
- Oldest champion: Virus (42 years, 170 days)
- Youngest champion: Dragon Lee (19 years, 335 days)
- Heaviest champion: Tommy Williams (84 kg (185 lb))
- Lightest champion: Dragon Lee (75 kg (165 lb))

The CMLL World Lightweight Championship (Spanish: Campeonato Mundial de Peso Ligero del CMLL) is a professional wrestling world championship promoted by the Consejo Mundial de Lucha Libre (CMLL), a Mexican Lucha Libre wrestling promotion (franchise). Originally, CMLL promoted the "Super Lightweight" division as part of their expansion into Japan in 1999 and 2000 and later reintroduced the division in 2003, at the same time they were running a CMLL World Super Lightweight Championship in Mexico. During Máscara Dorada's reign between 2009 and 2011, the name was changed to the CMLL Lightweight Championship, adjusting the weight limit.

The first CMLL Japan Super Lightweight Champion was Masato Yakushiji, who won it on February 27, 1999. The belt that represents the championship is the original one used in Japan in 1999 and 2000 and has not been updated to reflect the change in weight divisions. As it is a professional wrestling championship, it is won not by actual competition, but by a scripted ending to a match.

== Background ==
Lucha libre, or professional wrestling, is a form of entertainment where matches are presented as being competitive, but the outcome of the matches are pre-determined by their promoters. (Note: Hornbaker (2016) p. 550: "Professional wrestling is a sport in which match finishes are predetermined. Thus, win–loss records are not indicative of a wrestler's genuine success based on their legitimate abilities - but on now much, or how little they were pushed by promoters") As part of presenting lucha libre as a genuine combat sport, promoters create championships that are used in the storylines presented on their shows, they are not won as result of genuinely competitive matches. The championship is represented by a belt for the champion to wear before or after a match. (Note: Madigan (2007) p. 115: "With the victory, Médico Asasino brought some much needed importance to the heavyweight division where the championship belt had been passed around in lackluster matches. He, in turn, wore it proudly to the ring.")

The Mexican professional wrestling promotion Consejo Mundial de Lucha Libre (CMLL; "World Wrestling Council") introduced the CMLL Japan Super Lightweight Championship in 1999 and later renamed it the CMLL World Super Lightweight Championship in 2003. Mexican regulations define several weight classes, owing to its amateur wrestling roots. The official definition of the "Super Lightweight" in Mexico is a person who weights between 70 kg (150 lb) and 73 kg (161 lb). (Note: Reglamento de Box y Lucha Libre (2001): Articulo 242: Ligero 70 kilos / Super Ligero 73 kilos" ("Article 242: Lightweight 70 Kilo / Super Lightweight 73 Kilo")) In 2011 CMLL decided to adjust the weight class, changing the name to the "CMLL World Lightweight Championship. In lucha libre the Lightweight division is for competitors who weighs between 63 kg (139 lb) and 70 kg (150 lb). CMLL has at times ignored official the weight limit, giving the championship to heavier wrestlers, for example, Dragon Lee was billed as weighing 76 kg (168 lb) when he won the championship. Up until late 2021, all championship matches promoted in Mexico took place under best two-out-of-three falls rules. On occasion, single-fall title matches would take place, especially when promoting CMLL title matches in Japan, conforming to the traditions of the local promotion.

== History ==
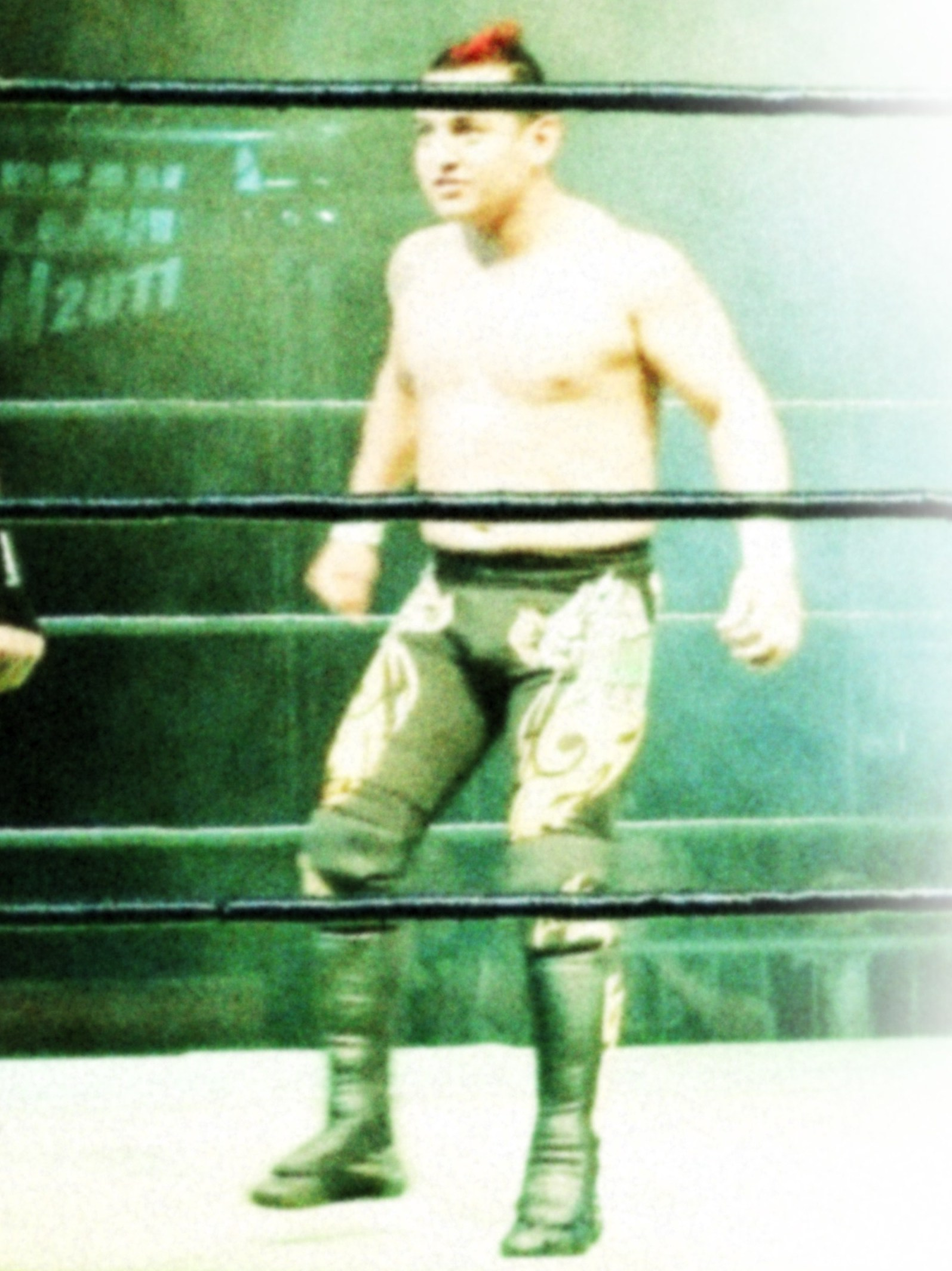
Ricky Marvin, champion when the title was called the CMLL Japan Super Lightweight Championship

In 1999, CMLL began to tour Japan, promoting a series of wrestling shows under the name "CMLL Japan". The shows featured a mixture of CMLL and Japanese wrestlers. On February 27, 1999, CMLL held a one-night tournament to determine who would be the inaugural CMLL Japan Super Lightweight Champion, marking the first time in the history of CMLL that they used a championship specifically for that weight class. (Note: The "Wrestling Title histories" book has chapters on CMLL Championships include NWA World Light Heavyweight Title, NWA World Middleweight Title, NWA World Welterweight Title, CMLL World Heavyweight Title, CMLL World Light Heavyweight Title, CMLL World Middleweight Title, CMLL World Welterweight Title, CMLL Women's World Title, CMLL World Mini-Estrella Title, CMLL World Tag Team Title, CMLL World Trios Title, Mexican National Light Heavyweight Title, Mexican National Lightweight Title, Mexican National Welterweight Title, Mexican National Women's Title, Mexican National Trios Title, Arena Coliseo Tag Team Championship) The tournament finale saw the Japanese Masato Yakushiji defeat CMLL wrestler Rencor Latino to become the first champion. (Note: MedioTiempo (June 6, 2011): "El Campeonato Mundial Ligero del CMLL nació en 1999 disputándose por primera vez en Nagoya, Japón, entre Rencor Latino (hoy Averno) y Massato Yakushiji, siendo el nipón el primer Campeón." ("The CMLL World Lightweight Championship was created in 1999 in Nagoya, Japan, in a match between Rencor Latino (today Averno) and Massato Yakushiji, where the Japanese emerged as the first champion.") The following year, CMLL promoted additional shows in Japan, during which CMLL wrestler Virus won the championship from Yakushiji. (Note: Duncan and Will (2000), p. 388: "Virus 1999/11/25 Tokyo, JPN") Virus and Ricky Marvin, a Mexican who was working for Japanese promotions at the time, exchanged the title in the fall of 2000. The last title match between the two took place in Acapulco, Guerrero, Mexico, after CMLL's last tour of Japan. The championship was discontinued by the end of 2000, as CMLL stopped promoting shows in Japan. (Note: CageMatch "Die CMLL kreierte einen Super Lightweight Title für die Japan-Touren, die sie in 1999 und 2000 veranstaltet haben. Mit dem Ende dieser Touren wurden auch die entsprechenden Titel wieder eingestellt." ("CMLL created a Super Lightweight Championship for their Japanese tours, which they held in 1999 and 2000. With the end of the tours the title in question was abandoned"))

In 2003, CMLL reinstated the super lightweight championship after a series of well-received matches between the Southern California team the Havana Brothers (Havana Brothers I, Havana Brother II and Havana Brother III) and the CMLL team of Ricky Marvin, Virus, and Volador Jr. CMLL announced they were establishing the CMLL World Super Lightweight Championship, elevating the championship from a regional to a "World" level championship. CMLL held a torneo cibernetico elimination match, which included the Havana Brothers, Sangre Azteca, Ricky Marvin, Virus, Volador Jr., Super Comando, Loco Max, Tigre Blanco, Neutro and Sombra de Plata. Havana Brother I won the tournament—and thus the championship—by eliminating Volador Jr. A few months later, Virus defeated Havana Brother I for the championship, after which the Havana Brothers stopped working for CMLL.

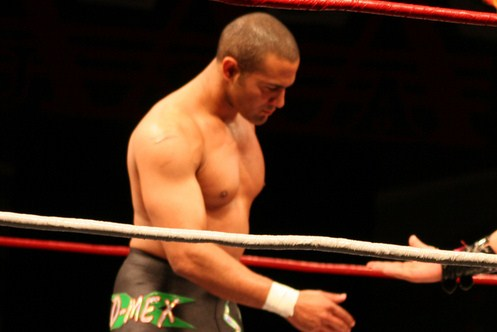
Three-time champion Rocky Romero in March 2009

In subsequent years, the championship was not defended, nor referred to by CMLL. In 2004, Havana Brother I returned to CMLL, this time working without a mask under the name Rocky Romero. CMLL openly acknowledged that Romero had previously worked as "Havana Brother I" and was a former champion as part of a buildup to a championship rematch between Romero and Virus. Romero became a two-time champion on December 10, 2004, but stopped working for CMLL shortly after the match. (Note: CageMatch: Cagematch lists no CMLL matches for Rocky Romero in 2004 after winning the championship and none in 2005 at all.) CMLL made no attempts to retrieve the championship from Romero at that time. Romero would on occasion defend the super lightweight championship on the Southern California independent circuit. In 2005, he lost the championship to Tommy Williams in a match that received no mainstream coverage; the title change was only reported on after the match. Romero regained the title from Tommy Williams and only defended it once after winning it, on a New Japan Pro-Wrestling Dojo show in California. When Romero returned to CMLL in 2008, it was as an enmascarado (masked character) called "Grey Shadow", with no public acknowledgment of his history with CMLL as he never wore nor defended the championship. (Note: CageMatch: CageMatch.net does not list any championship matches for "Grey Shadow")

The CMLL World Super Lightweight Championship was not officially declared vacant until Romero left CMLL to work for their rival AAA. CMLL held a tournament to crown a new champion, and on April 7, 2009, Máscara Dorada won a torneo cibernetico elimination match for the super lightweight championship. (Note: Súper Luchas (April 8, 2009): "Mascara Dorada obtiene el Campeonato Súper Ligero CMLL al vencer en un torneo cibernético" ("Mascara Dorada won the CMLL Super Lightweight Championship by winning a cibernetico tournament")) During Máscara Dorada's reign, the weight class was adjusted from the "Super Lightweight" to simply the "Lightweight" division, expanding the official weight limit of the championship. In 2011, Máscara Dorada vacated the championship when he announced that he was moving up to the middleweight division instead. Virus became a four-time champion on June 7, 2011, after defeating Guerrero Maya Jr. in the finals of a tournament, making him the only wrestler to have held all three versions of the championship. His fourth reign lasted from June 2011 to April 5, 2015, when he lost the championship to Dragon Lee. (Note: Terra Networks (2015): "En la tercera y definitiva, los gladiadores ofrecieron una emocionante caída que se definió de manera espectacular a favor de Dragón Lee, quien aplicó una lanza a Virus para derrotarlo y proclamarse nuevo campeón" ("In the third and final fall, the wrestlers worked an exciting and dramatic fall that came out in favor of Dragon Lee, who applied a spear to Virus to win the match and become the new champion")) On January 23, 2016, Dragon Lee defended the championship on the 2016 Fantastica Mania tour of Japan, marking the first time since 2000 that the championship was defended in Japan. (Note: njpw.co.jp (2016): "セミファイナルのCMLL世界ライト級選手権試合ドラゴン・リーvsヴィールスは、リーが変型ジャーマンスープレックスホールドで王座を防衛。" ("Semi-final CMLL World Lightweight Championship match Dragon Lee vs Virus, Lee defended the championship with a German Suplex")) The following day, Dragon Lee's first reign came to an end as he lost the championship to Kamaitachi on the final day of the Fantastica Mania tour. 40 days after winning the championship from Dragon Lee, Kamaitachi lost the championship back to Dragon Lee during CMLL's weekly Super Viernes show on March 4, 2016. (Note: Terra Networks (March 5, 2016) "Tras una larga y espectacular tercera caída, Dragon Lee venció a Kamaitachi para recuperar el título ligero del Consejo Mundial de Lucha Libre (CMLL)" ("After a long and spectacular third fall, Dragon Lee defeated Kamaitachi to regain the Consejo Mundial de Lucha Libre (CMLL) lightweight title")) On June 14, 2019, Dragon Lee announced that he was vacating the championship to focus on defending the CMLL World Welterweight Championship that he also held at the time of the announcement.

Despite lucha libre's holistic approach to weight classes when compared to other wrestling cultures, CMLL tends to harbor a noted disinterest in its Lightweight championships. With the common practice being for a champion to "move up in weight class" & vacate the belt if they impress CMLL management enough for a featured push, due to them suddenly being perceived as bigger than the division and above losing to anyone in it.

== Reigns ==
Calavera Jr. I is the current champion in his first reign. He won the title from Stigma at Lunes Classico in Puebla, Puebla on November 16, 2026, whilst already holding the Mexican National Lightweight Championship. Eleven different wrestlers have held the championship for eighteen reigns in total. Virus holds the record for most reigns, with four: two in Japan and two in Mexico. He held the title for a total of 2,046 days, more than any other champion, and his fourth reign lasted 1,398 days, the longest individual reign until Stigma surpassed it with 1,707 days (4 years of which, granted, involved no defences). Ricky Marvin had the shortest individual reign, lasting somewhere between 1 day to 32 days. The belt that represents the championship has not been updated since the days of the CMLL Japan Super Lightweight Championship; the faceplate still reads "Super Ligero" as well as "Japan".

== Title history ==
Key
No.	Overall reign number
Reign	Reign number for the specific champion
Days	Number of days held
N/A	Unknown information
+	Current reign is changing daily

No.	Champion	Championship change			Reign statistics		Notes	Ref.
No.	Champion	Date	Event	Location	Reign	Days	Notes	Ref.
Consejo Mundial de Lucha Libre (CMLL)
1	Masato Yakushiji	February 27, 1999	Live event	Nagoya, Japan	1	271	Defeated Rencor Latino to become the first champion.	
2	Virus	November 25, 1999	Live event	Tokyo, Japan	1	255		
3	Ricky Marvin	August 6, 2000	Live event	Yokohama, Japan	1	(Note: The exact date Ricky Marvin lost the championship has not been verified, which means the title reign lasted between 1 day and 113 days.)		
4	Virus	September 2, 2000	Live event	(Note: The championship information did not include the location of the match.)	2	(Note: The exact date Virus won the championship has not been verified, which means the title reign lasted between 1 day and 114 days.)		
5	Ricky Marvin	November 29, 2000	Live event	Acapulco, Guerrero, Mexico	2		Also won the Mexican National Lightweight Championship	
—	Deactivated	December 2000	—	—	—	—	Championship was abandoned when CMLL stopped promoting in Japan by the end of 2000.	
6	Havana Brother I	September 12, 2003	Live event	Mexico City, Mexico	1	94	Defeated Volador Jr. in a tournament final.	
7	Virus	November 14, 2003	Live event	Mexico City, Mexico	3	392		
8	Rocky Romero	December 10, 2004	Live event	Mexico City, Mexico	2	338	Previously held the championship under the name Havana Brother I	
9	Tommy Williams	September 15, 2005	Live event	Los Angeles, California	1	128		
10	Rocky Romero	January 21, 2006	Live event	Industry, California	3	1,168	Rocky Romero began working as "Grey Shadow" in early 2008 but the title was never officially vacated until Romero began working for Asistencia Asesoria y Administracion (AAA).	
—	Vacated	April 3, 2009	—	—	—	—	Championship confirmed vacated when CMLL announced a tournament to be held four days later.	
11	Máscara Dorada	April 7, 2009	Arena México show	Mexico City, Mexico	1	730	Won a 10-man torneo cibernetico match over Angel Azteca, Jr., Rey Cometa, Pegasso, Ángel de Oro, Tiger Kid, Polvora, Inquisidor, Super Comando and Ángel de Plata	
—	Vacated	April 7, 2011	—	—	—	—	Championship vacated after Dorada moved up to the middleweight division	
12	Virus	June 7, 2011	Arena México show	Mexico City, Mexico	4	1,398	Defeated Guerrero Maya, Jr. in a tournament final to win the vacant title.	(Note: Medio Tiempo (2016): "Virus sacó a relucir toda su experiencia ante el joven prospecto, que no se quedo atrás en lucharle al tú por tú al ahora Campeón." ("Virus brought out all his experience against the young prospect, who fought one-on-one with the now-Champion."))
13	Dragon Lee	April 5, 2015	Arena México show	Mexico City, Mexico	1	294		(Note: CMLL (April 15, 2015): "arribó como retador al Campeonato Mundial de Peso Ligero del CMLL y se retiro como el nuevo Campeón" ("he arrived as a challenger to the CMLL World Lightweight Championship and left as the new Champion"))
14	Kamaitachi	January 24, 2016	Fantastica Mania 2016	Tokyo, Japan	1	40		(Note: njpw.co.jp (January 24, 2016): "第6試合は、高橋広夢ことカマイタチが、CMLLで抗争中のドラゴン・リーのCMLL世界ライト王座に挑戦。 この一戦は非常にスピーディーで高度な技の応酬となり、最後はカマイタチがカナディアンデストロイヤーでリーを粉砕。" ("In the sixth match, Takahashi Hiroyuki Kamaitachi challenged Dragon Lee for the CMLL World Lightweight Championship. This match was very speedy and displayed advanced technique, and ended with Lee being defeated by Kamaitachi with a Canadian Destroyer."))
15	Dragon Lee	March 4, 2016	Super Viernes	Mexico City, Mexico	2	1,197		(Note: Consejo Mundial de Lucha Libre (March 4, 2016): "pero esta brillante exhibición llego a su fin cuando el originario de Tala, Jalisco aplicó un potente súplex a KAMAITACHI para recuperar el cetro" ("but this brilliant match came to an end when the native of Tala, Jalisco applied a powerful suplex to KAMAITACHI to regain the championship")) (Note: NotiMex (March 4, 2017): "Tras una larga y espectacular tercera caída, Dragon Lee venció a Kamaitachi para recuperar el título ligero del Consejo Mundial de Lucha Libre (CMLL)," ("After a long and spectacular third fall, Dragon Lee defeated Kamaitachi to regain the Consejo Mundial de Lucha Libre (CMLL) lightweight title,"))
—	Vacated	June 14, 2019	—	—	—	—	Dragon Lee vacated the championship to focus on the CMLL World Welterweight Championship.	
16	Kawato-San	June 30, 2019	Domingos Arena México	Mexico City, Distrito Federal	1	129	Defeated Audaz in a 2 out of three falls match from a tournament final to win the vacant title.	
—	Vacated	November 6, 2019	—	—	—	—	CMLL vacated the championship after Kawato-San was injured and unable to wrestle for four months.	
17	Stigma	March 15, 2022	Martes de Arena México	Mexico City, Distrito Federal	1	1,707	Defeated Suicida in a tournament final to win the title.	
18	Calavera Jr. I	November 16, 2026	Lunes Classico	Puebla, Puebla	1	2+	Calavera was reigning Mexican National Lightweight Champion at the time of this win.	

== Combined reigns ==
As of November 18, 2026.

†	Indicates the current champion
¤	The exact length of at least one title reign is uncertain, so the shortest possible length is used.

Rank	Wrestler	# of reigns	Combined days	Ref(s).
1	Virus	4	2,046¤	
2	Stigma †	1	1,707	
3	Rocky Romero	3	1,569	
4	Dragon Lee	2	1,491	
5	Máscara Dorada	1	730	
6	Masato Yakushiji	1	271	
7	Kawato-San	1	129	
8	Tommy Williams	1	128	
9	Kamaitachi	1	40	
10	Ricky Marvin	2	2¤	
11	Calavera Jr. I †	1	2+	
