= CMLL World Middleweight Championship =

Professional wrestling world championship

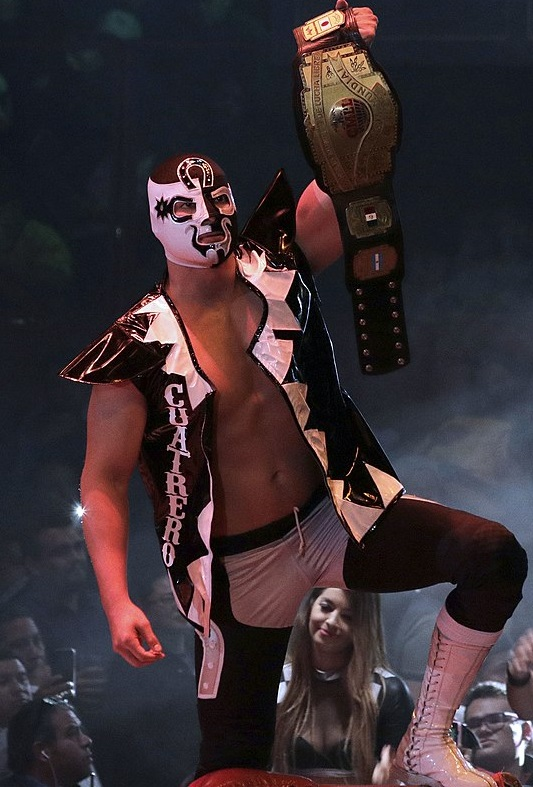
- Former champion El Cuatrero, displaying the championship belt

Details
- Promotion: Consejo Mundial de Lucha Libre
- Date established: December 18, 1991
- Current champion: Templario
- Date won: May 12, 2023
Statistics
- First champion: Blue Panther
- Most reigns: El Dandy (3 times)
- Longest reign: Dragón Rojo Jr. (5 years, 127 days days) (Note: CMLL (March 26, 2017): "Ángel de Oro resistió los movimientos más potentes del Dragón Rojo y en el momento más indicado lo atrapó con una huracarrana, con la cual puso punto final a uno de los reinados más longevos de la historia" ("Ángel de Oro resisted the most powerful moves of Dragón Rojo and at the more opportune time caught him with a huracanrana, with which he put an end to one of the longest reigns in history."))
- Shortest reign: El Dandy (63 days)
- Oldest champion: Ringo Mendoza (49 years, 169 days)
- Youngest champion: El Hijo del Fantasma (25 years, 82 days)
- Heaviest champion: Apolo Dantés (104 kg (229 lb))
- Lightest champion: Averno (79 kg (174 lb))

The CMLL World Middleweight Championship (Spanish: Campeonato Mundial de Peso Medio del CMLL) is a professional wrestling world championship promoted by the Mexican wrestling promotion Consejo Mundial de Lucha Libre (CMLL). While lighter weight classes are regularly ignored in wrestling promotions in the United States, with most emphasis placed on "heavyweights", more emphasis is placed on the lighter classes in Mexican companies. The official definition of the middleweight division in Mexico is a person between 82 kg (181 lb) and 87 kg (192 lb), but the weight limits are not strictly adhered to. As it is a professional wrestling championship, it is not won via legitimate competition; it is instead won via a scripted ending to a match or on occasion awarded to a wrestler because of a storyline.

The championship is currently held by Templario, who defeated Dragón Rojo, Jr. for the title on May 12, 2023. Dragón Rojo Jr. is the longest reigning champion in the history of the championship. Since its creation in 1991, there have been 22 individual championship reigns shared between 11 wrestlers. El Dandy is the only three-time champion; he also has the shortest reign of any champion at 63 days.

== History ==
The middleweight division was one of the first weight divisions in Mexican lucha libre to have a specific championship as the Mexican National Middleweight Championship was created in 1933. (Note: 'Duncan & Will (2000): chapter name "Mexico: National Middleweight Title" "Octavio Gaona 1937/02/06 Mexico City, MEX, Defeats Black Guzman") When the Mexican professional wrestling promotion Empresa Mexicana de Lucha Libre ("Mexican Wrestling Enterprise"; EMLL) was founded in September 1933, they became one of several Mexican promotions to promote the championship. EMLL later created the World Middleweight Championship to represent the highest level prize of the middleweight division, higher than the Mexican National Middleweight Championship. (Note: Duncan & Will (2000) p. 389: "Gus Kallio #, N/A, Kallio was awarded the title for already holding the World Middleweight Title") In 1952, EMLL joined the National Wrestling Alliance (NWA) and changed the title to the NWA World Middleweight Championship. (Note: Duncan & Will (2000) p. 389: "Championship renamed the NWA World Middleweight Title")

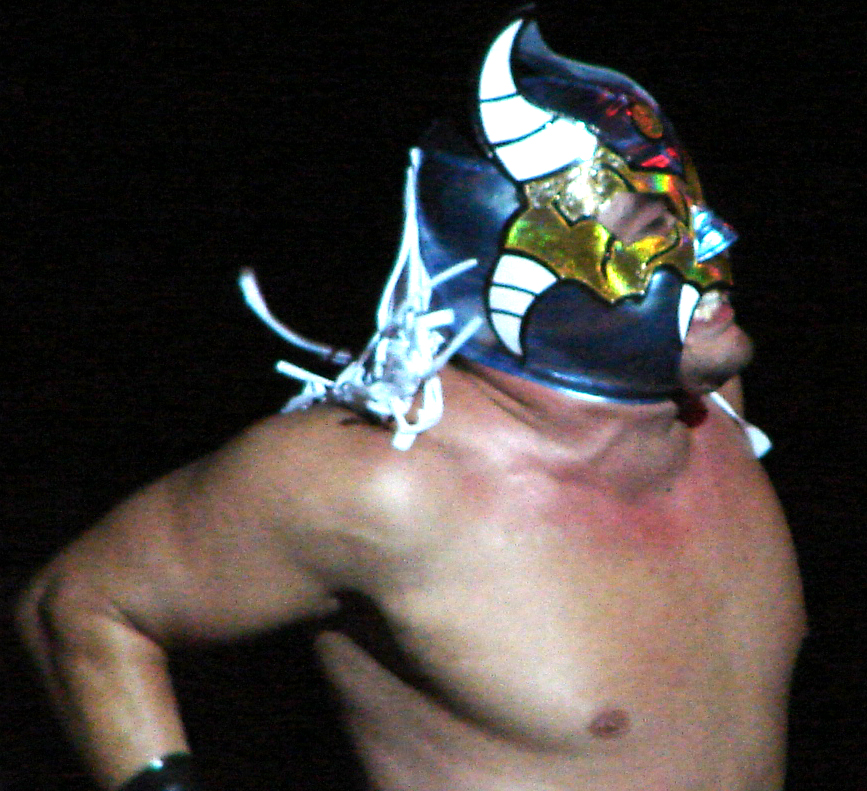
Averno, the 13th CMLL World Middleweight Champion

In the late 1980s, EMLL left the NWA over internal politics, and by 1991 they had changed their name to Consejo Mundial de Lucha Libre ("World Wrestling Council"; CMLL) to distance themselves from the NWA. (Note: Madigan (2007) p. 32: "in the late 1980s EMLL withdrew from the National Wrestling Alliance") At first, they continued to use the name "NWA World Middleweight Championship" as the name had originated with EMLL, but they soon created a series of CMLL-branded world championships, including the CMLL World Middleweight Championship, which became the third middleweight championship in the company. (Note: Duncan & Will (2000) p. 395: "Blue Panther 1991/18/12 Acapulco, MEX defeats El Satanico in a tournament final") CMLL held a one-night, eight-man tournament to determine the first middleweight champion on December 18, 1991. The tournament final saw Blue Panther defeat El Satánico to become the first new titleholder.

In June 1992, many wrestlers left CMLL to join the newly formed Asistencia Asesoría y Administración ("Assistance, Assessment, and Administration"; AAA), which significantly affected CMLL's middleweight championships. The Mexico City Boxing and Wrestling Commission allowed AAA to assume control of the Mexican National Middleweight Championship as the reigning champion Octagón had joined AAA. Meanwhile, the CMLL World Middleweight Championship was vacated after the departure of the champion, Blue Panther. CMLL held a 16-man battle royal match to reduce the field to two finalists. El Dandy and Negro Casas survived the match, and a week later El Dandy defeated Casas to become the second CMLL World Middleweight Champion. (Note: Duncan & Will (2000) p. 395: "El Dandy 1992/07/03. defeats Negro Cass in a tournament final") (Note: Record (November 19, 2011): "El otrora Diamante Negro Jr. venció al japonés Lyger y le arrebató el cinturón que avala el Consejo Mundial de Lucha Libre" ("The former Black Diamond Jr. defeated the Japanese Lyger and took the Consejo Mundial de Lucha Libre belt")) The championship has not been vacant since then.

The exodus from CMLL to AAA also meant that CMLL lost control of the Mexican National Middleweight Championship as then-reigning champion Octagón was among the wrestlers that left the promotion. The Mexico City Boxing and Wrestling Commission allowed AAA to take control of the Mexican National Middleweight Championship at that point in time. On August 12, 2010, CMLL returned the NWA World Middleweight Championship to the NWA, but immediately replaced it with the NWA World Historic Middleweight Championship to keep two "world" level championships in the middleweight division.

On May 3, 2010, Jushin Thunder Liger defeated Negro Casas to win the CMLL World Middleweight Championship. The match took place in Fukuoka, Japan, which was the first time the championship changed hands outside of Mexico and also marked the first time a non-Mexican wrestler held the championship. (Note: Súper Luchas (May 3, 2010): "En la Primera de ellas el Negro Casas expuso el titulo mundial de peso medio ante Jushin Thunder Liger, quién salió con el titulo en la cintura, por lo que por primera vez en Negro Casas pierde en Japon un titulo." ("In the first of them Negro Casas defended the middleweight championship against Jushin Thunder Liger, who left with the title around his waist, marking the first time Negro Casas lost a championship to a Japanese"))

== Reigns ==
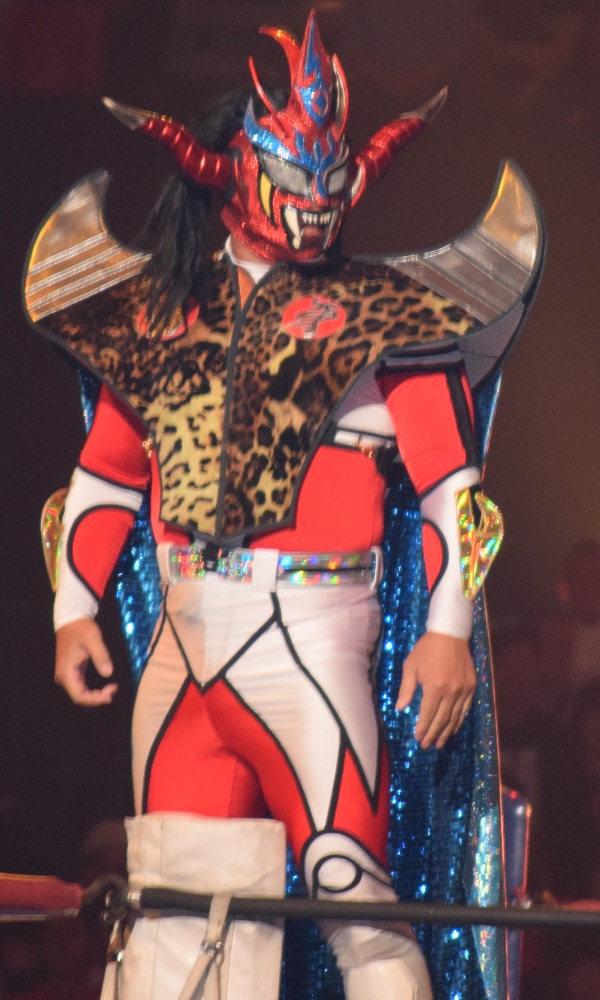
Jushin Thunder Liger, the only Japanese wrestler to hold the championship

Soberano Jr. is the current champion, having won the title on December 12, 2021 at CMLL Super Viernes. This is Soberano Jr.'s first reign as middleweight champion; he is the 20th overall champion. Dragón Rojo Jr. is the wrestler who has held the championship the longest, a total of 5 years, 127 days. El Dandy holds the record for most CMLL World Middleweight Championship reigns with three and is one of only three wrestlers to hold the title more than once, the others being Negro Casas and Emilio Charles Jr. El Dandy also held the record for the shortest reign—his second lasted only 63 days.

== Rules ==
The official definition of the middleweight division in Mexico is from 82 kg (181 lb) to 87 kg (192 lb). (Note: Comisión de Box y Lucha Libre (2001): "Articulo 242: Super Welter 82 kilos / Medio 87 kilos" ("Article 242: Super Welter 82 kilos / Middleweight 87 kilos")) In the 20th century, CMLL was generally consistent and strict about enforcing the actual weight limits, but in the 21st century the official definitions have at times been overlooked for certain champions. One example of this was when Mephisto, officially listed as 90 kg (200 lb), won the CMLL World Welterweight Championship, a weight class with an 82 kg (181 lb) upper limit.

With twelve CMLL-promoted championships labelled as "World" titles, the promotional focus shifts from championship to championship over time with no single championship consistently promoted as the "main" championship; instead CMLL's various major shows feature different weight divisions and are most often headlined by a Lucha de Apuestas ("Bet match") instead of a championship match. From 2013 until June 2016, only two major CMLL shows have featured championship matches: Sin Salida in 2013 and the 2014 Juicio Final show featuring the NWA World Historic Welterweight Championship. (Note: MedioTiempo (2001): "Volador Jr. Consiguió vencer a La Sombra y se hizo del Campeonato Welter Histórico NWA." ("Volador Jr. managed to defeat La Sombra and became the NWA Historic Welter Championship.")) (Note: Súper Luchas (June 2, 2013): "Con una 'casita' Mascara Dorada logro derrotar al 4:40 Negro Casas este domingo 2 de Junio en la Arena México" ("With a 'casita' Mascara Dorada managed to defeat the 4:40 Negro Casas this Sunday June 2 at the Arena Mexico")) Up until late 2021, all championship matches promoted in Mexico took place under best two-out-of-three falls rules. (Note: Comisión de Box y Lucha Libre p. 44 "Articulo 258. Cada combate de lucha libre tendrá como limite tres caídas; cada caída será sin limite de tiempo, ganará quien obtenga dos caídas de las tres en disputa" ("Article 258. Each wrestling match shall have as limit three falls; each fall will be without time limit. The winner will be the one to first obtain two of the three falls in the match")) On occasion, single-fall title matches took place, especially when promoting CMLL title matches in Japan, conforming to the traditions of the local promotion, illustrated by Jushin Thunder Liger winning the championship during New Japan Pro-Wrestling's Wrestling Dontaku 2010 in a single-fall match.

== Tournaments ==
=== 1991 ===
In 1991, CMLL held an eight-man, one-night tournament to crown the first ever CMLL World Middleweight Champion. In the end, Blue Panther won the championship by defeating El Satánico.

First round
Blue Panther	W
Ringo Mendoza
Espectro Jr.
El Dandy	W
Ángel Azteca	W
Emilio Charles Jr.
El Satánico	W
El Hijo de Gladiador

Semifinals
Blue Panther	W
El Dandy
Ángel Azteca
El Satánico	W

Final
Blue Panther	W
El Satánico

=== 1992 ===
Due to a large number of wrestlers leaving the company in the summer of 1992, the middleweight championship was vacated, forcing CMLL to hold a tournament. They opted to start out with a 16-man battle royal elimination match as a means to qualify for the final match the following week. Negro Casas and El Dandy outlasted a field of wrestlers that consisted of Guerrero Maya, Águila Solitaria, Ponzona, Guerrero del Futuro, Plata, Espectro de Ultratumba, Espectro Jr., Oro, Javier Cruz, Kung Fu, Kato Kung Lee, Ringo Mendoza, Bestia Salvaje and Último Dragón. The following week El Dandy defeated Casas to start his first of three championship reigns.
