= NWA World Historic Welterweight Championship =

Wrestling championship

- The belt design of all three NWA Historic championships

Details
- Promotion: Consejo Mundial de Lucha Libre
- Date established: August 12, 2010
- Current champion: Máscara Dorada 2.0
- Date won: December 15, 2023

Other name
- CMLL Historic Welterweight Championship
Statistics
- First champion: Mephisto
- Most reigns: Volador Jr. (3 reigns)
- Longest reign: Volador Jr. (4,492)
- Shortest reign: La Sombra (56 days)
- Oldest champion: Negro Casas (52 years, 34 days) (Note: PWI Almanac p. 69: "Date of birth: January 10, 1960")
- Youngest champion: La Sombra (21 years, 130 days) (Note: "Fuego en el Ring": "Fecha de nacimiento: 03 de Noviembre de 1983" ("Date of Birth: November 3, 1983"))
- Heaviest champion: Matt Taven (99 kg (218 lb))
- Lightest champion: Máscara Dorada (80 kg (180 lb)) (Note: NJPW: "体重 80kg" ("Weight 80 kg"))

The World Historic Welterweight Championship, also known as the NWA World Historic Welterweight Championship (Campeonato Mundial Historico de Peso Welter de la NWA in Spanish), is a professional wrestling championship governed by Consejo Mundial de Lucha Libre (CMLL). CMLL had held the NWA World Welterweight Championship for over 53 years even after leaving the NWA in 1989. In 2010 the National Wrestling Alliance, represented by Blue Demon Jr., the president of NWA Mexico, sent letters to CMLL telling them to stop promoting NWA-branded championships since CMLL was not part of the NWA any longer. On August 12, 2010, CMLL debuted the new NWA World Historic Welterweight Championship belt and named Mephisto, the final CMLL-recognized NWA World Welterweight Champion, as the inaugural champion. The championship was initially announced as the CMLL Historic Welterweight Championship, but when the belt was unveiled, it was labelled the "NWA World Historic Welterweight Championship".

In Mexico, the lucha libre commission's definition of the welterweight weight class is between 70 kg (150 lb) and 78 kg (172 lb). Máscara Dorada 2.0 is the current NWA World Historic Welterweight Champion, having defeated Rocky Romero on December 15, 2023. This is Máscara Dorada 2.0's first reign with the title; he is the eleventh overall champion. Volador Jr.'s third reign was the longest of any NWA World Historic Welterweight Champion at 1,631 days. Up until late 2021, all title matches took place under best two-out-of-three falls rules when in Mexico, but were defended in single fall matches in Japan.

== History ==
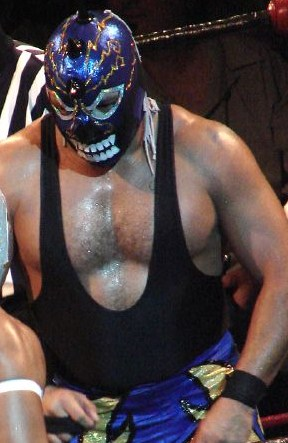
Mephisto, the last NWA World Welterweight Champion

In 1948 the Mexican wrestling promotion Empresa Mexicana de Lucha Libre (EMLL; Spanish for "Mexican Wrestling Enterprise") created the World Welterweight Championship. (Note: Duncan & Will (2000) p. 390, Chapter name "EMLL NWA Welterweight Title") When EMLL became a member of the National Wrestling Alliance (NWA) in 1952 the championship was given the "NWA" prefix and became known as the NWA World Welterweight Championship. In the late 1980s, EMLL left the National Wrestling Alliance (NWA) to avoid the politics of the NWA. (Note: Hornbakker (2006) p 305: "EMLL was a member of the NWA from 1952 to 1986, and Lutteroth controlled the Alliance world light heavyweight, middleweight and welterweight titles.") While they left the NWA they did retain control of the NWA World Welterweight Championship as their main championship of the welterweight division. They also promoted the Mexican National Welterweight Championship as a secondary title in the Welterweight division. (Note: Duncan & Will (2000) p. 392 chapter name "Mexico: National Welterweight Title) In 1992 EMLL changed their name and became known as Consejo Mundial de Lucha Libre (CMLL; "World Wrestling Council") to rebrand themselves as a separate entity after leaving the NWA. (Note: Madigan "in the late 1980s EMLL withdrew from the National Wrestling Alliance") They added a third welterweight championship to the promotion when they created the CMLL World Welterweight Championship on February 15, 1992.

After the introduction of the CMLL championship, the then-reigning NWA World Welterweight Championship Misterioso left CMLL, vacating the championship. (Note: Duncan & Will (2000) p. 390 "Vacant in 92/05 when Misterioso leaves EMLL.") For the subsequent three years, CMLL did not promote the NWA World Welterweight Championship until bringing it back in the winter of 1995. Negro Casas won the championship, holding it until August 1996 where he lost it as part of a tournament to create the J-Crown, eight championships unified as one. from 1996 through 2007 the championship was promoted in Japan, but on November 27, 2007, La Sombra defeated Hajime Ohara to bring the championship back to CMLL.

In 2010 the NWA, represented by NWA Mexico president Blue Demon Jr., reached out to CMLL and asked them to stop using the NWA-branded championships since they were not part of the NWA. Blue Demon Jr. was in the process of establishing NWA Mexico as a promotion and wanted to use the championship. (Note: Súper Luchas (March 4, 2010): "Blue Demon Jr. informó que NWA México desconoce los títulos mundiales que tienen los elementos del CMLL" ("Blue Demon Jr. Reported that NWA Mexico does not recognize the world championships controlled by CMLL")) There had been previous attempts by the NWA to gain back control of the three NWA-branded championships that CMLL used, the welterweight championship as well as the NWA World Light Heavyweight Championship and the NWA World Middleweight Championship, but in those instances, CMLL had not responded to those requests at all. The promotion did not directly respond to the latest claim; the NWA Welterweight Champion, Mephisto, commented instead, simply stating that the championships belonged to CMLL. (Note: Súper Luchas (March 12, 2010): "esos campeonatos siempre han estado en luchadores del CMLL" ("those championships have always belonged to CMLL wrestlers")) Finally, on August 12, 2010, CMLL debuted the new NWA World Historic Welterweight Championship belt and named Mephisto, the final CMLL-recognized NWA World Welterweight Champion, as the inaugural champion. The championship was initially announced as the CMLL Historic Welterweight Championship, but when the belt was unveiled, it was called the NWA World Historic Welterweight Championship.

== Reigns ==
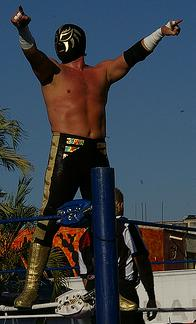
La Sombra, the youngest wrestler to win the championship

Máscara Dorada 2.0 is the current NWA World Historic Welterweight Champion, having won the title on December 15, 2023, defeating Rocky Romero He is the eleventh overall champion. Volador Jr. and La Sombra are the only two wrestlers to hold the championship at least twice. Volador Jr's second reign is the longest individual reign while La Sombra's 56-day reign in 2014 is the shortest of all championship reigns. On January 22, 2012, La Sombra became the first champion to defend the NWA World Historic Welterweight Championship outside of Mexico as he defeated Volador Jr. during the CMLL and New Japan Pro-Wrestling (NJPW) co-promoted Fantastica Mania 2012 in Tokyo, Japan. (Note: NJPW (January 22, 2012): "メインイベントは、現在のCMLLでトップ2と言われるラ・ソンブラとボラドール・ジュニアが、NWA世界ヒストリック・ウェルター王座を懸けて激突。" ("In the main event, La Sombra and Volador Jr., who are said to currently be the top 2 in CMLL, met in a match for the NWA World Historic Welterweight Championship. ")) (Note: Súper Luchas (January 22, 2012): "NWA World Historic Welterweight Title: La Sombra (c) vence a Volador Jr. (21:47) con un Moonsault Press defendiendo el título." ("NWA World Historic Welterweight Title: La Sombra (c) defeated Volador Jr. (21:47) with a Moonsault Press defending the title."))

At the age of 21 years, 130 days when he won the championship the first time, La Sombra is the youngest wrestler to win the championship. At 52 years, 34 days at the time of his title win, Negro Casas is the oldest wrestler to win the championship.

== Rules ==
As a professional wrestling championship, it is not won legitimately; it is instead won via a predefined outcome of matches. (Note: Hornbaker (2016) p. 550: "Professional wrestling is a sport in which match finishes are predetermined. Thus, win–loss records are not indicative of a wrestler's genuine success based on their legitimate abilities - but on now much, or how little they were pushed by promoters") The Championship is designated as a welterweight title, which means that the championship can officially only be competed for by wrestlers weighing between 70 kg (150 lb) and 78 kg (172 lb). (Note: Comisión de Box y Lucha Libre p. 42 "Welter77 kilos" ("Welterweight 77 Kilos")) In the 20th century Mexican wrestling enforced the weight divisions more strictly, but in the 21st century the rules have occasionally been ignored for some of the weight divisions. The heaviest welterweight champion on record is Mephisto who was announced as weighing 90 kg (200 lb), 12 kg (26 lb) above the official maximum weight limit. While the heavyweight championship is traditionally considered the most prestigious weight division in professional wrestling, CMLL places more emphasis on the lower weight divisions. (Note: Madigan (2007): "Traditionally the heavyweight division was not considered the biggest draw, nor the most important division in Mexico") Up until late 2021, all championship matches promoted in Mexico took place under best two-out-of-three falls rules, (Note: Comisión de Box y Lucha Libre p. 44 "ARTICULO 258.- Cada combate de lucha libre tendrá como limite tres caídas; cada caída será sin limite de tiempo, ganará quien obtenga dos caídas de las tres en disputa" ("ARTICLE 258.- Each wrestling match shall have as limit three falls; Each fall will be without time limit. The winner will be the one to first obtain two of the three falls in the match,")) while championship matches promoted in Japan followed the local custom and were only one fall matches.

== Title history ==
Key
No.	Overall reign number
Reign	Reign number for the specific champion
Days	Number of days held
+	Current reign is changing daily

No.	Champion	Championship change			Reign statistics		Notes	Ref.
No.	Champion	Date	Event	Location	Reign	Days	Notes	Ref.
Consejo Mundial de Lucha Libre (CMLL)
1	Mephisto	August 12, 2010	Press conference at Arena México	Mexico City	1	213	Mephisto was the final CMLL-recognized NWA World Welterweight Champion and was thus named the first NWA World Historic Welterweight Champion.	
2	La Sombra	March 13, 2011	Domingo Familiar	Mexico City	1	337		(Note: Súper Luchas (March 14, 2011): "5.- Campeonato mundial histórico NWA peso Welter: Sombra nuevo campeón al vencer a Mephisto" ("5 NWA World Historic Welterweight Championship Sombra became the new champion with a victory over Mephisto"))
3	Negro Casas	February 13, 2012	Live event	Puebla, Puebla	1	475		(Note: Cinco Radio: "obtuvo el histórico campeonato mundial welter de la NWA" ("he won the historic NWA welterweight championship "))
4	Máscara Dorada	June 2, 2013	Sin Salida	Mexico City	1	170		(Note: CMLL (June 3, 2013): "El Campeonato Mundial Histórico NWA de Peso Welter tiene un nuevo dueño: Máscara Dorada." ("The NWA Welterweight World Championship has a new owner: Máscara Dorada"))
5	Volador Jr.	November 19, 2013	Martes Popular	Mexico City	1	199		(Note: CMLL (November 20, 2013): "uego de haber transcurridos varios minutos y con una caída por bando, Máscara Dorada no pudo soportar más y tras ser impactado de forma brutal con un Canadian Destroyer perdió el título" ("After several minutes and with a fall by side, Máscara Dorada could not take any more and after being brutally hit with a Canadian Destroyer lost the title"))
6	La Sombra	June 6, 2014	Super Viernes	Mexico City	2	56	This match was also for La Sombra's NWA World Historic Middleweight Championship.	(Note: CMLL (June 6, 2014): "Pero al final con la ayuda de Rush y La Máscara; La Sombra se convierte en doble campeón." ("in the end with the help of Rush and La Máscara; La Sombra becomes a double champion"))
7	Volador Jr.	August 1, 2014	El Juicio Final	Mexico City	2	1,337		(Note: CMLL (August 2, 2014): "pero Volador reaccionó y clavó a La Sombra en la lona, el toque de espaldas fue inminente. Hay nuevo Campeón." ("but Volador reacted and drove La Sombra into the canvas, the pinfall followed. There is new Champion."))
8	Matt Taven	March 30, 2018	Super Viernes	Mexico City	1	126		
9	Volador Jr.	August 3, 2018	Negro Casas 40th Anniversary Show	Mexico City	3	1,631		
10	Rocky Romero	January 20, 2023	Super Viernes	Mexico City	1	328		
11	Máscara Dorada 2.0	December 15, 2023	Super Viernes	Mexico City	1	1,069+		

== Combined reigns ==
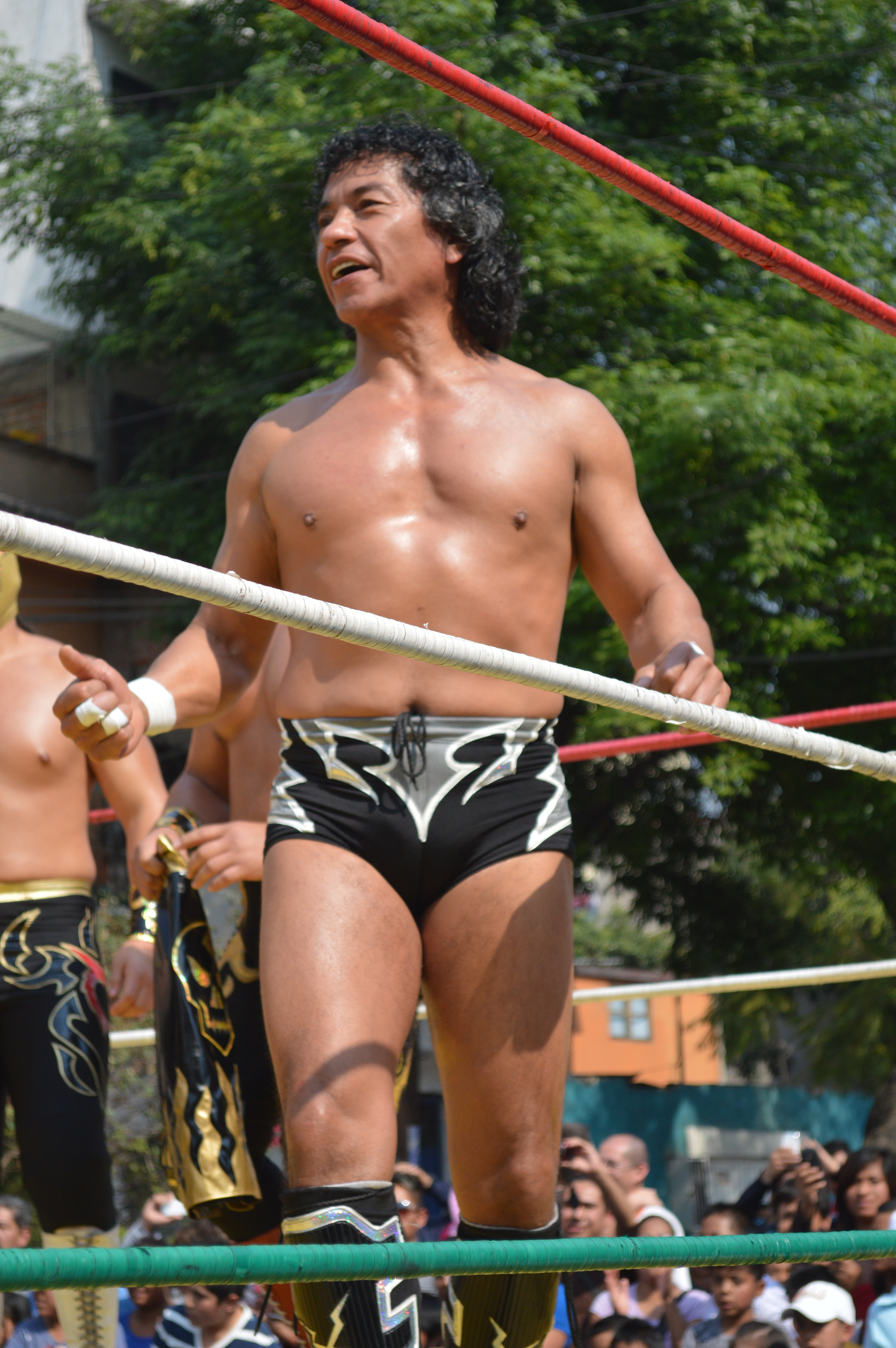
Negro Casas, the oldest wrestler to win the championship

As of October 8, 2026.

Key

†	Indicates the current champion

Rank	Wrestler	No. of reigns	Combined days	Ref(s).
1	Volador Jr.	3	3,167	
2	Máscara Dorada 2.0 †	1	1,069+	
3	Negro Casas	1	475	
4	La Sombra	2	393	
5	Rocky Romero	1	328	
6	Mephisto	1	213	
7	Máscara Dorada	1	170	
8	Matt Taven	1	126	

== Bibliography ==
- Duncan, Royal; Will, Gary (2000). Wrestling title histories: professional wrestling champions around the world from the 19th century to the present. Waterloo, ON: Archeus Communications. ISBN 0-9698161-5-4.
- Hornbaker, Tim (2016). "Statistical notes". Legends of Pro Wrestling - 150 years of headlocks, body slams, and piledrivers (Revised ed.). New York, New York: Sports Publishing. ISBN 978-1-61321-808-2.
- Madigan, Dan (2007). ""Okay... what is Lucha Libre?"". Mondo Lucha a Go Go: the bizarre & honorable world of wild Mexican wrestling. New York, New York: HarperCollins Publishers. p. 31. ISBN 978-0-06-085583-3. "featuring clearly distinguished good guys and bad guys, or técnicos and rudos"
- Hornbaker, Tim (2007). "International Expansion". National Wrestling Alliance: the untold story of the monopoly that strangled pro wrestling. ECW Press. ISBN 978-1-55022-741-3.
