= CMLL World Welterweight Championship =

Professional wrestling championship

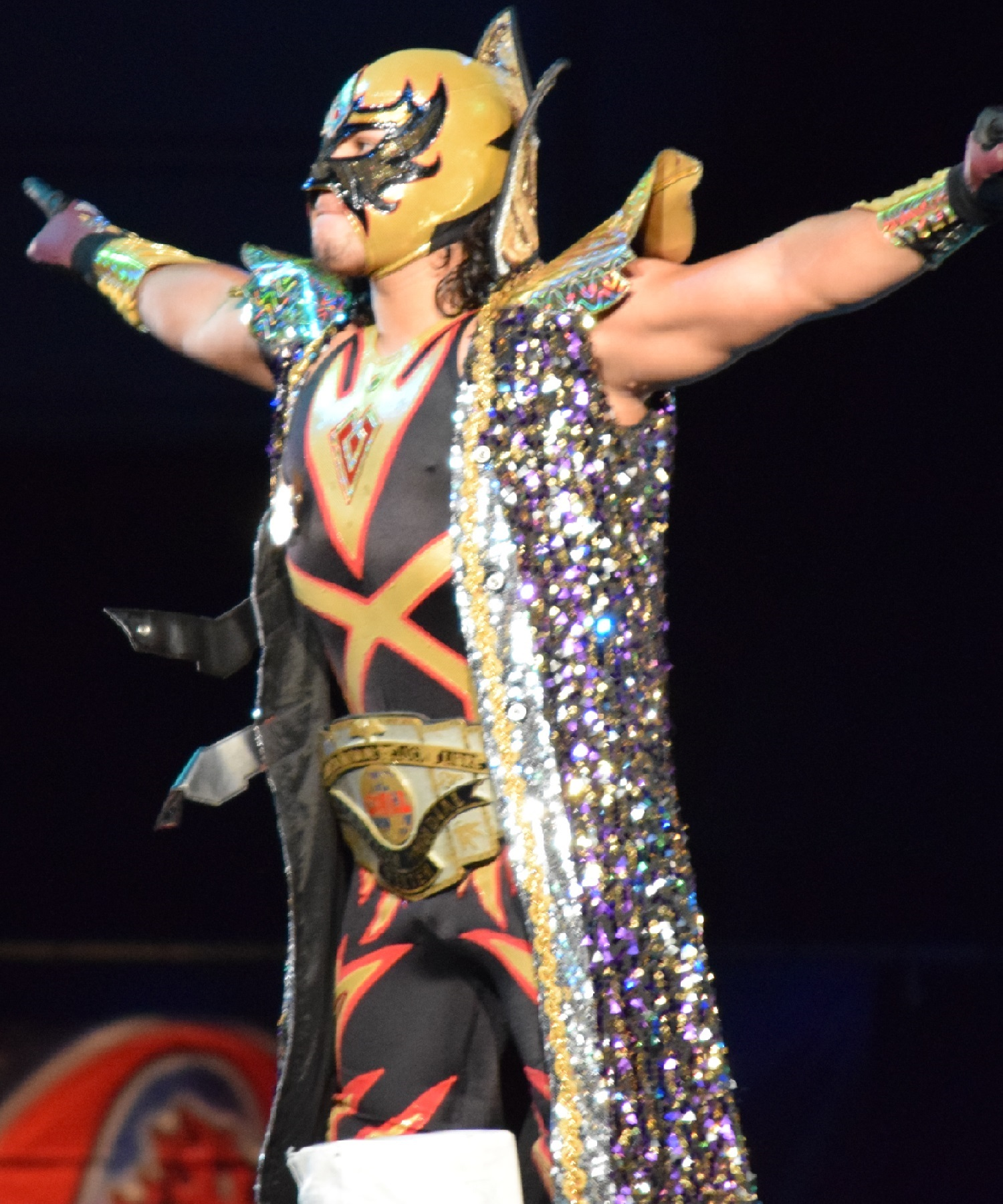
- Record four-time champion the original Máscara Dorada with the title belt in August 2015

Details
- Promotion: Consejo Mundial de Lucha Libre
- Date established: February 15, 1992
- Current champion: Titán
- Date won: December 8, 2019
Statistics
- First champion: Fuerza Guerrera
- Most reigns: Máscara Dorada (4 times)
- Longest reign: Titán (6 years, 227 days)
- Shortest reign: Fuerza Guerrera (22 days)
- Oldest champion: Negro Casas (49 years, 69 days)
- Youngest champion: Místico (21 years, 190 days)
- Heaviest champion: Olímpico (92 kg (203 lb))
- Lightest champion: Místico (76 kg (168 lb))

The CMLL World Welterweight Championship (Spanish: Campeonato Mundial de Peso Welter del CMLL) is a professional wrestling world championship in the Mexican professional wrestling promotion Consejo Mundial de Lucha Libre (CMLL). The official definition of the welterweight division in Mexico is between 70 kg (150 lb) and 78 kg (172 lb) but the official weight limits are not always adhered to. As with other professional wrestling championships, it is not won or lost competitively but is instead scripted by the bookers of a wrestling promotion. The title is awarded after the chosen wrestler "wins" a match.

Overall there has been a total of 34 official championship reigns, shared between 22 different wrestlers. Titán is the current champion, having defeated Soberano Jr. in the finals of a tournament for the vacant championship. The original Máscara Dorada is the only wrestler to hold the championship four times. Titán's first and current reign is the longest individual reign, at 2,537+ days since December 8, 2019. The championship has been defended in Mexico and Japan, with three title changes in Japan. The championship has been vacated three times, and CMLL has held three tournaments for the championship.

== History ==
In the late 1980s, CMLL left the National Wrestling Alliance (NWA) but retained control of the NWA World Welterweight Championship as their main championship of the welterweight division. They also promoted the Mexican National Welterweight Championship as a secondary title for the Welterweight division. In 1991 they decided to create a series of CMLL-branded world championships, one of which was for the welterweight division. They held a four-man tournament on February 15, 1992, to crown the first welterweight champion. The participants were Fuerza Guerrera, El Felino, América and El Khalifa; in the finals, Fuerza Guerrera defeated El Khalifa to become the first champion. On July 16, 1992, the Mexican National Welterweight Champion defeated CMLL Welterweight Champion América, vacating the Mexican National Welterweight Championship. In 1993 control of the Mexican National Welterweight Championship was transferred from CMLL to rival promotion Asistencia Asesoría y Administración (AAA).

In 1996 the championship was vacated after then-champion El Pantera lost the championship to Super Delfin while on tour in Japan. Pantera left CMLL for AAA after the tour, and lost a match to Super Delfin in Japan, intending to surrender the championship to him. CMLL knew that Pantera was leaving and nullified the championship change, choosing not to vacate the title rather than recognizing the title change. CMLL put together a 16-man tournament to crown a new champion, and Máscara Mágica defeated El Felino in the final to become the seventh official CMLL World Welterweight Champion. Máscara Mágica would later defeat Super Delfin to put an end to any questions about the lineage of the championship. In 1998 the Mexican National Welterweight Championship was returned to CMLL, making it a tertiary title behind the CMLL and NWA branded world championships. In 2010 CMLL returned the NWA World Welterweight Championship to the NWA but immediately replaced it with the NWA World Historic Welterweight Championship. In early 2015 then-champion Máscara Dorada signed a contract to work for New Japan Pro-Wrestling (NJPW) for a year, with CMLL allowing him to take the championship with him to Japan. During his tour of Japan Máscara Dorada lost the championship to Bushi, which was officially acknowledged by CMLL.

== Reigns ==
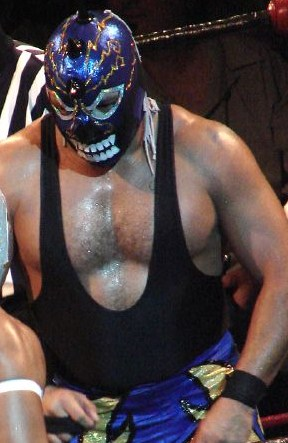
Mephisto, a two-time champion, whose first reign from 2004 to 2007 lasted 1,141 days

The championship is designated as a welterweight title, which means that the championship can officially only be competed for by wrestlers weighing between 70 kg (150 lb) and 78 kg (172 lb). In the 20th century Mexican wrestling enforced the weight divisions more strictly, but in this century the rules have occasionally been ignored for some weight divisions. The heaviest welterweight champion on record is Olímpico who was announced as weighing 92 kg (203 lb), 14 kg (31 lb) above the maximum weight limit. While the heavyweight championship is traditionally considered the most prestigious weight division in professional wrestling, CMLL places more emphasis on the lower weight divisions. (Note: Madigan (2007) p. 115: "Traditionally the heavyweight division was not considered the biggest draw, nor the most important division in Mexico") Up until late 2021, all championship matches promoted in Mexico took place under best two-out-of-three falls rules, while championship matches promoted in Japan follow the local custom, decided by a single fall.

Titán is the current champion after defeating Soberano Jr. at a CMLL show in Arena Mexico on December 8, 2019. He is the 34th overall champion and has the longest reign at 2,537+ days, surpassing the combined and individual reign records previously held by Mephisto, whose two combined reigns totaled 2,191 days, and whose longest individual reign lasted 1,141 days from 2004 to 2007. The first champion Fuerza Guerrera is also the person who has held the title the shortest time, 22 days, except possibly for Mascara Magica, whose second reign was shorter; no specific date for the start of the reign has been confirmed, so his reign may have been as short as 6 days.

== Tournaments ==
=== 1992 ===
On February 15, 1992, CMLL held a one-night, four-man tournament to crown the first ever CMLL World Welterweight Champion. The welterweight championship was the fifth CMLL branded world championship created after the CMLL World Heavyweight, CMLL World Light Heavyweight, CMLL World Trios and CMLL World Middleweight Championship. In the tournament finals Fuerza Guerrera defeated El Khalifa to win the championship.

Semifinals
Fuerza Guerrera	W
El Felino
América
El Khalifa	W

Final
Fuerza Guerrera	W
El Khalifa

=== 1996 ===
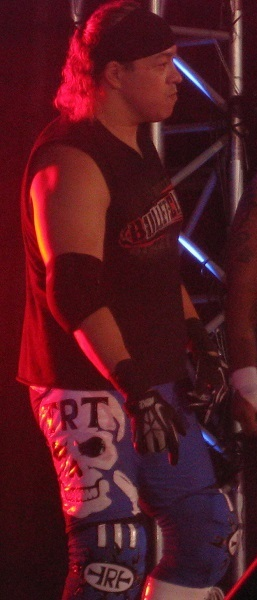
Rey Bucanero who was eliminated in the second round.

In 1996 CMLL decided not to acknowledge that La Pantera had lost the CMLL World Welterweight Championship during a tour of Japan, declaring the title vacant instead. They held a 16-man tournament from May 7 to May 21, 1996, to crown a new champion. In the finals Máscara Mágica defeated El Felino to become the seventh champion.

First round
Rey Bucanero	W
Fantastik
Black Panther	W
Olimpico
Astro Rey Jr.	W
Atlantico
Máscara Mágica	W
Guerrero Maya
Karloff Lagarde Jr.	W
Ultimatum
Ciclón Ramírez	W
Yone Genjin
El Felino	W
Alacran de Durango
Ángel Azteca	W
Zumbido

Second round
Rey Bucanero
Black Panther	W
Astro Rey Jr.
Máscara Mágica	W
Karlof Lagarde Jr.
Ciclón Ramírez	W
El Felino	W
Ángel Azteca

Semifinals
Black Panther
Máscara Mágica	W
Ciclón Ramírez
El Felino	W

Finals
Máscara Mágica	W
El Felino

=== 2014-2015 ===
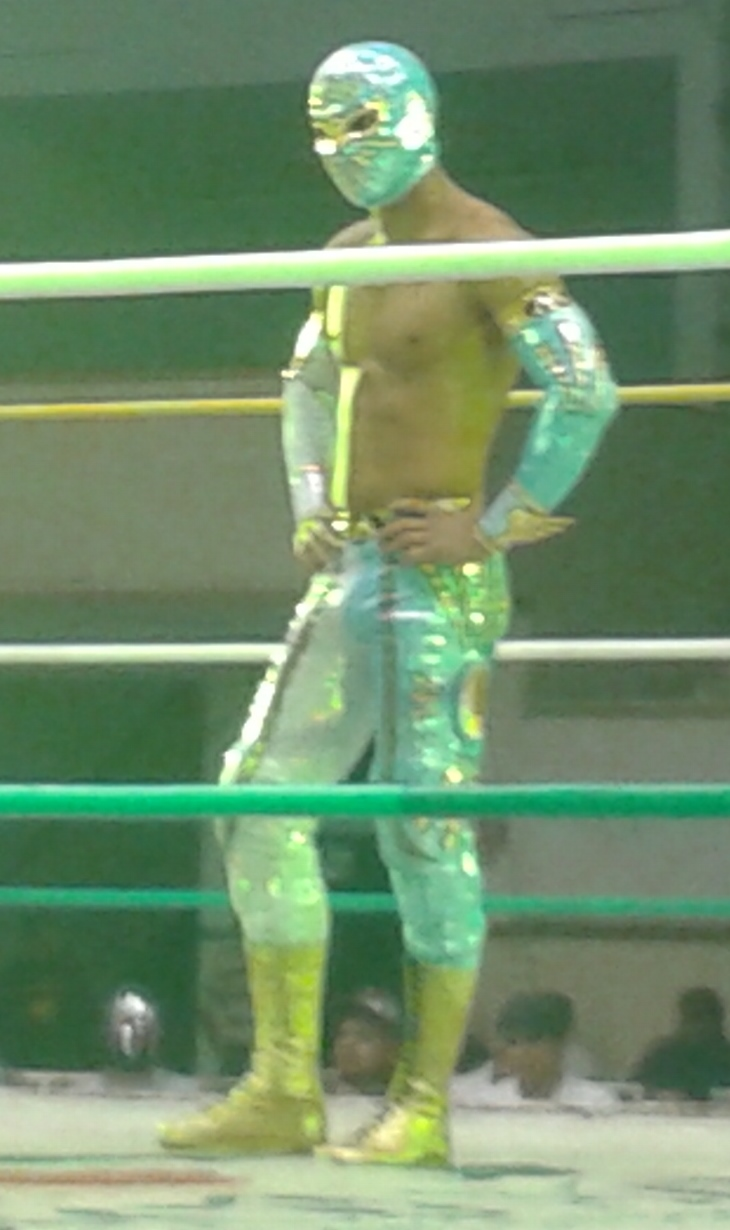
Místico, who was forced to vacate the championship in 2014

On May 2, 2015, then-reigning CMLL World Welterweight Champion Místico crashed his motorcycle, breaking the fibula and tibia in his right leg. He had surgery the following day. Due to the injury the Welterweight championship became inactive for several months, as Místico was unable to compete. During a press conference on November 19, 2014, Místico announced that he was not ready to return to the ring, which led to the CMLL World Welterweight Championship being declared vacant. On December 26, 2014, CMLL held a 10-man Torneo cibernetico elimination match to determine the next champion. Negro Casas and Máscara Dorada outlasted the other eight competitors; Delta, Fuego, Kamaitachi, Pólvora, Rey Cometa, Sangre Azteca, Titán and Tritón. A week later Máscara Dorada defeated Negro Casas to become the 29th CMLL World Heavyweight Champion.

Torneo cibernetico order of elimination

#	Eliminated	Eliminated by
1	Sangre Azteca	Tritón
2	Rey Cometa	Pólvora
3	Tritón	Delta
4	Fuego	Kamaitachi
5	Delta	Titán
6	Kamaitachi	Negro Casas
7	Pólvora	Máscara Dorada
8	Titán	Negro Casas
9	Winner	Negro Casas
9	Winner	Máscara Dorada

=== 2019 ===
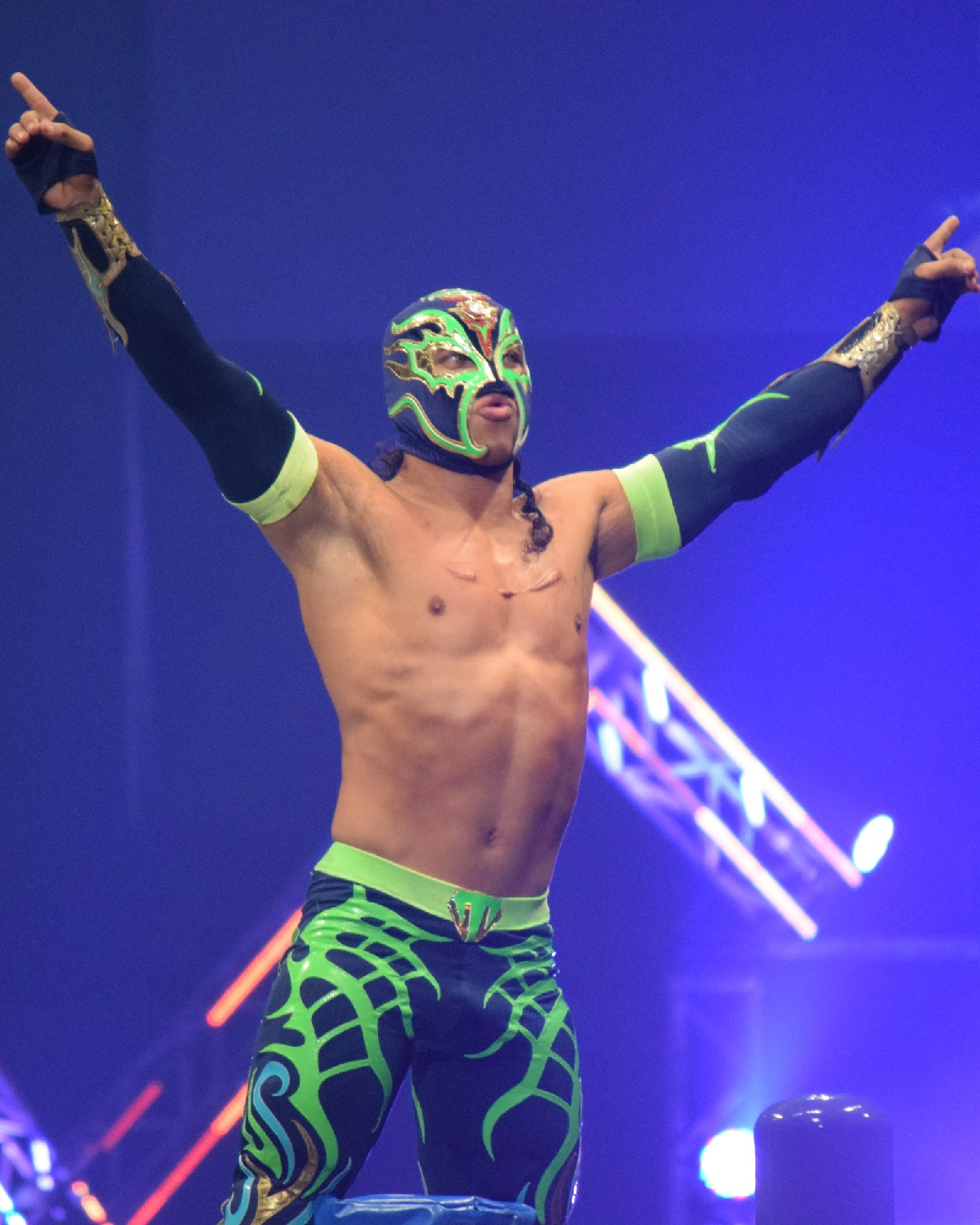
The tournament winner and 34th champion Titán.

On September 27, 2019, CMLL fired then-reigning CMLL World Welterweight Champion Dragon Lee, but at the time did not mention any plans for the championship itself. It was not until November that CMLL announced their plans, as they revealed a tournament to crown a new champion that would start on December 1, 2019. The tournament started with a 12-man torneo cibernetico elimination match to determine the two finalists. The match saw Soberano Jr. and Titán outlast Audaz, Negro Casas, Drone, Fuego, Fugaz, Dulce Gardenia, Rey Cometa, Star Jr., Stigma, and Templario to qualify for the finals the following week. The following week Titán defeated Sobreano Jr. two falls to one, to become the 34th CMLL World Welterweight Champion.

Torneo cibernetico order of elimination

#	Eliminated	Eliminated by
1	Drone	TBD
2	Fugaz	Templario
3	Rey Cometa	Dulce Gardenia
4	Fuego	Star Jr.
5	Templario	Negro Casas
6	Dulce Gardenia	TBD
7	Audaz	Soberano Jr.
8	Negro Casas	Star Jr.
9	Star Jr.	Titán
10	Winners	Titán and Soberano Jr.
