= NWA World Historic Middleweight Championship =

Professional wrestling championship

- The belt design of all three NWA Historic championships

Details
- Promotion: Consejo Mundial de Lucha Libre
- Date established: August 12, 2010
- Current champion: Volador Jr.
- Date won: July 3, 2026

Other name
- CMLL Historic Middleweight Championship
Statistics
- First champion: Averno
- Longest reign: Místico (2,263 days)
- Shortest reign: Volador Jr. (45 days)
- Oldest champion: Último Guerrero (43 years, 183 days)
- Youngest champion: La Sombra (23 years, 78 days)
- Heaviest champion: Último Guerrero (93 kg (205 lb))
- Lightest champion: Averno (73 kg (161 lb))

The World Historic Middleweight Championship, also known as the NWA World Historic Middleweight Championship (Campeonato Mundial Historico de Peso Medio de la NWA in Spanish), is a professional wrestling championship promoted by Consejo Mundial de Lucha Libre (CMLL). The official definition of the middleweight weight class in Mexico is between 82 kg (181 lb) and 87 kg (192 lb), but is not always strictly enforced. For example, previous NWA World Historic Middleweight Champion Último Guerrero is billed as weighing 95 kg (209 lb). Volador Jr. is the current champion, he is the tenth champion overall and he is in his second reign.

For over 62 years CMLL controlled the NWA World Middleweight Championship, even after leaving the National Wrestling Alliance (NWA) in the late 1980s. Up until 2010 the NWA more or less ignored CMLL's use of the championship, but in March 2010 Blue Demon Jr., the president of the newly formed NWA Mexico, sent letters to CMLL, demanding that they stop promoting the NWA-branded championships since they were not part of the organization. NWA Mexico had previously tried to reclaim the three NWA-branded championships promoted by CMLL, but was ignored by CMLL. Finally, on August 12, 2010, CMLL debuted the new NWA World Historic Middleweight Championship belt and named Averno, the final CMLL-recognized NWA World Middleweight Champion, as the inaugural champion.

== Background ==
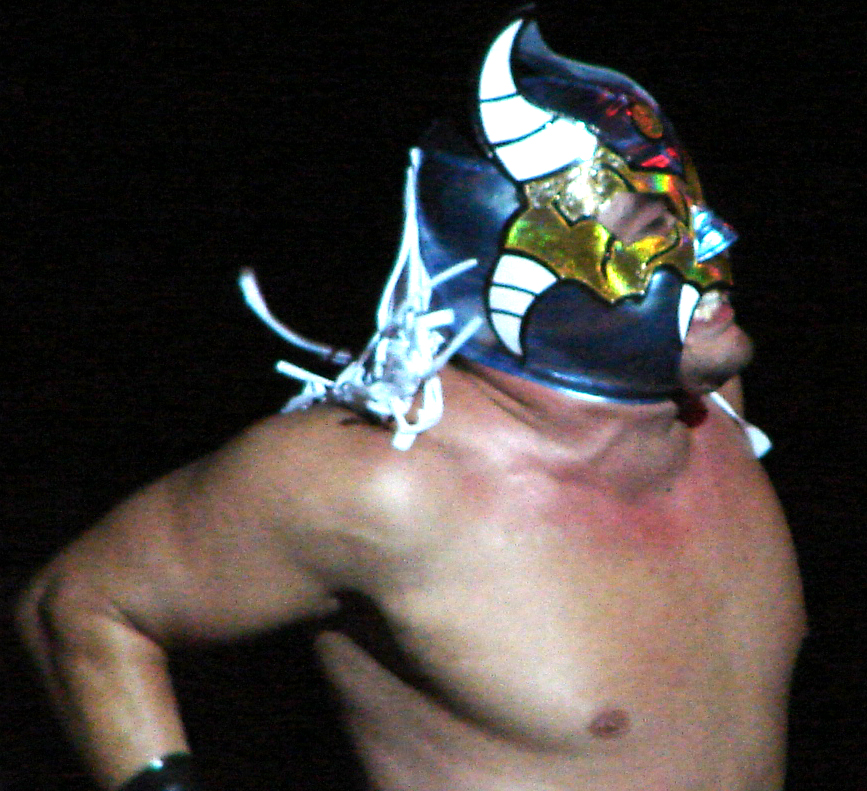
Averno, the first NWA World Historic Middleweight Champion

In 1933 the Mexican National Middleweight Championship was introduced as Yaqui Joe won it in a tournament. The same year Salvador Lutteroth founded Empresa Mexicana de Lucha Libre (EMLL; "Mexican Wrestling Enterprise") and would later be allowed to host matches for the Mexican National Middleweight Championship although they did not have exclusive rights to the championship.

In either late-1938 or early-1939 Lutteroth and EMLL declared that Gus Kallio, due to holding the National Wrestling Association World Middleweight Championship was also recognized as the World Middleweight Champion in Mexico. On February 19, 1939 Kallio lost the championship to EMLL wrestler Octavio Gaona, to create EMLL's main championship for the middleweight division. In 1952 EMLL joined the National Wrestling Alliance (NWA) and the middleweight championship was rebranded as the NWA World Middleweight Championship from that point forward. In 1989 EMLL left the NWA because the promoters did not want to deal with the internal politics of the NWA at the time. While they left the NWA they kept promoting the NWA World Middleweight Championship as well as the NWA World Light Heavyweight Championship and the NWA World Welterweight Championship that they had controlled for years.

In 1991. EMLL changed their name to "Consejo Mundial de Lucha Libre" (CMLL; "World Wrestling Council") and began to introduce a number of CMLL branded championships. On December 18, 1991, Blue Panther won the CMLL World Middleweight Championship in a tournament, giving CMLL control of three different middleweight championships at the time. In 1992, then-CMLL promoter Antonio Peña left CMLL along with a number of CMLL wrestlers, and founded rival promotion Asistencia Asesoría y Administración, later known simply as AAA. One of the wrestlers that left CMLL was Octagón, who was the reigning Mexican National Middleweight Champion. The Mexico City Boxing and Wrestling Commission granted AAA the rights to promote the Mexican National Middleweight Championship from that point on.

On December 4, 1993, Corazón de León won the NWA World Middleweight Championship on a CMLL show and then took the title with him when he began working in Japan. On November 8, 1994, Último Dragón won the championship and for the next 10 years the title was promoted primarily in Japan. On September 3, 2004, Averno defeated Zumbido to win the vacant championship, bringing it back under CMLL's control.

In March 2010, Blue Demon Jr., the president of the newly formed NWA Mexico, reached out to CMLL, demanding that they stop promoting the NWA-branded championships since they were not part of the NWA. While the NWA had previously tried to reclaim the three NWA-branded championships promoted by CMLL, those requests were ignored by CMLL. The promotion did not directly respond to the latest request either; instead the then-NWA Welterweight Champion, Mephisto, commented on the situation, simply stating that the titles belonged to CMLL. Finally, on August 12, 2010, CMLL announced that they were replacing the NWA World Middleweight Championship with the CMLL World Historic Middleweight Championship and named Averno, the final CMLL-recognized NWA World Middleweight Champion, as the inaugural champion. When Averno made his first appearance with the championship it had been rebranded as the "NWA World Historic Middleweight Championship" (Campeonato Mundial Historico de Peso Medio de la NWA in Spanish).

== Reigns ==
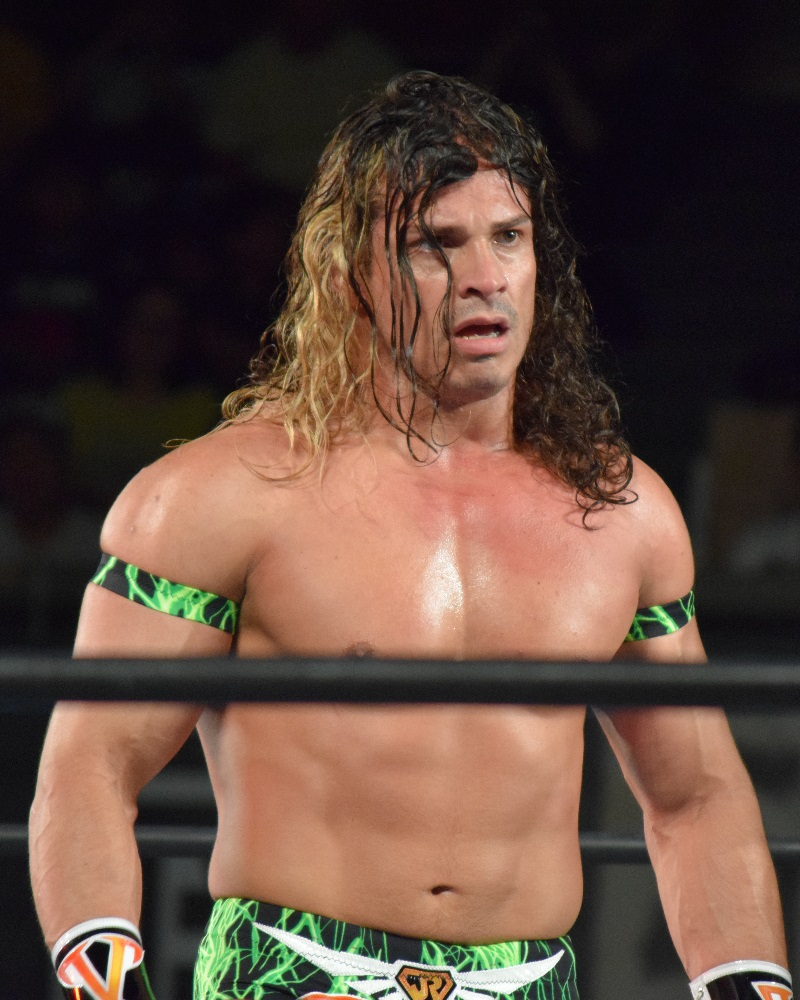
current champion Volador Jr..

Volador Jr. is the current champion in his second reign. He won the title by defeating Flip Gordon at CMLL Viernes Especatular in Mexico City, Mexico on July 3, 2026. He is the tenth overall champion, and the first wrestler to hold the championship more than once so far. The championship has been vacated once since its creation in 2010, and has been defended in both Mexico and in Japan. Volador Jr. was the shortest reigning champion, holding the title for 45 days in early 2012, while Mistico currently holds the record for the longest reign at 2,263 days (or over six years). When La Sombra defeated Dragón Rojo Jr. to win the championship during the Fantastica Mania 2013 show in Bunkyo, Tokyo, it marked the first time the championship changed hands outside of Mexico.

With his victory on August 31, 2015, Último Guerrero became the oldest wrestler to win the championship, being 43 years, 183 days old, while La Sombra was the youngest wrestler to win the championship, 23 years, 78 days old. At an official weight of 79 kg (174 lb) Averno is the lightest wrestler to hold the championship, while Último Guerrero, at 93 kg (205 lb), is the heaviest champion.

== Rules ==
The championship, being a professional wrestling championship, is not won legitimately: it is instead won via a scripted ending to a wrestling match. The official definition of the middleweight weight class in Mexico is between 82 kg (181 lb) and 87 kg (192 lb), but is not always strictly enforced. For example, the previous NWA World Historic Middleweight Champion Último Guerrero is billed as weighing 93 kg (205 lb), significantly above the official weight limit. A Up until late 2021, all championship matches promoted in Mexico took place under best two-out-of-three falls rules, while championship matches held in Japan normally conform to the one fall rule that is customary in Japanese wrestling.

== Title history ==
Key
No.	Overall reign number
Reign	Reign number for the specific champion
Days	Number of days held
+	Current reign is changing daily

No.	Champion	Championship change			Reign statistics		Notes	Ref.
No.	Champion	Date	Event	Location	Reign	Days	Notes	Ref.
Consejo Mundial de Lucha Libre (CMLL)
1	Averno	August 12, 2010	Press conference at Arena México	Mexico City, Distrito Federal	1	467	Averno was the final CMLL-recognized NWA World Middleweight Champion and was thus named the first NWA World Historic Middleweight Champion.	
2	La Máscara	November 22, 2011	Live event	Mexico City, Distrito Federal	1	84		
3	Volador Jr.	February 14, 2012	CMLL Guadalajara Martes	Guadalajara, Jalisco	1	45		
4	Prince Devitt	March 30, 2012	CMLL Super Viernes	Mexico City, Distrito Federal	1	182		
5	Dragón Rojo Jr.	September 28, 2012	CMLL Super Viernes	Mexico City, Distrito Federal	1	114		
6	La Sombra	January 20, 2013	Fantastica Mania 2013	Bunkyo, Tokyo	1	953		
7	Último Guerrero	August 31, 2015	Lunes Clasicos	Puebla, Puebla	1	1,086	`	
8	Carístico/Místico	August 21, 2018	Nuevos Valores	Guadalajara, Jalisco	1	2,263	On August 25, 2021, Carístico reverted to his ring name Místico.	
—	Vacated	October 31, 2024	—	—	—	—	Místico vacated the title in order to move up to the light heavyweight division.	
9	Flip Gordon	November 15, 2024	CMLL Viernes Especatular	Mexico City, Mexico	1	595	Defeated Villano III Jr. to win the vacant title.	
10	Volador Jr.	July 3, 2026	CMLL Viernes Especatular	Mexico City, Mexico	2	138+		
