= List of CMLL Super Viernes shows in 2014 =

List of Super Viernes professional wrestling shows in 2014

2014
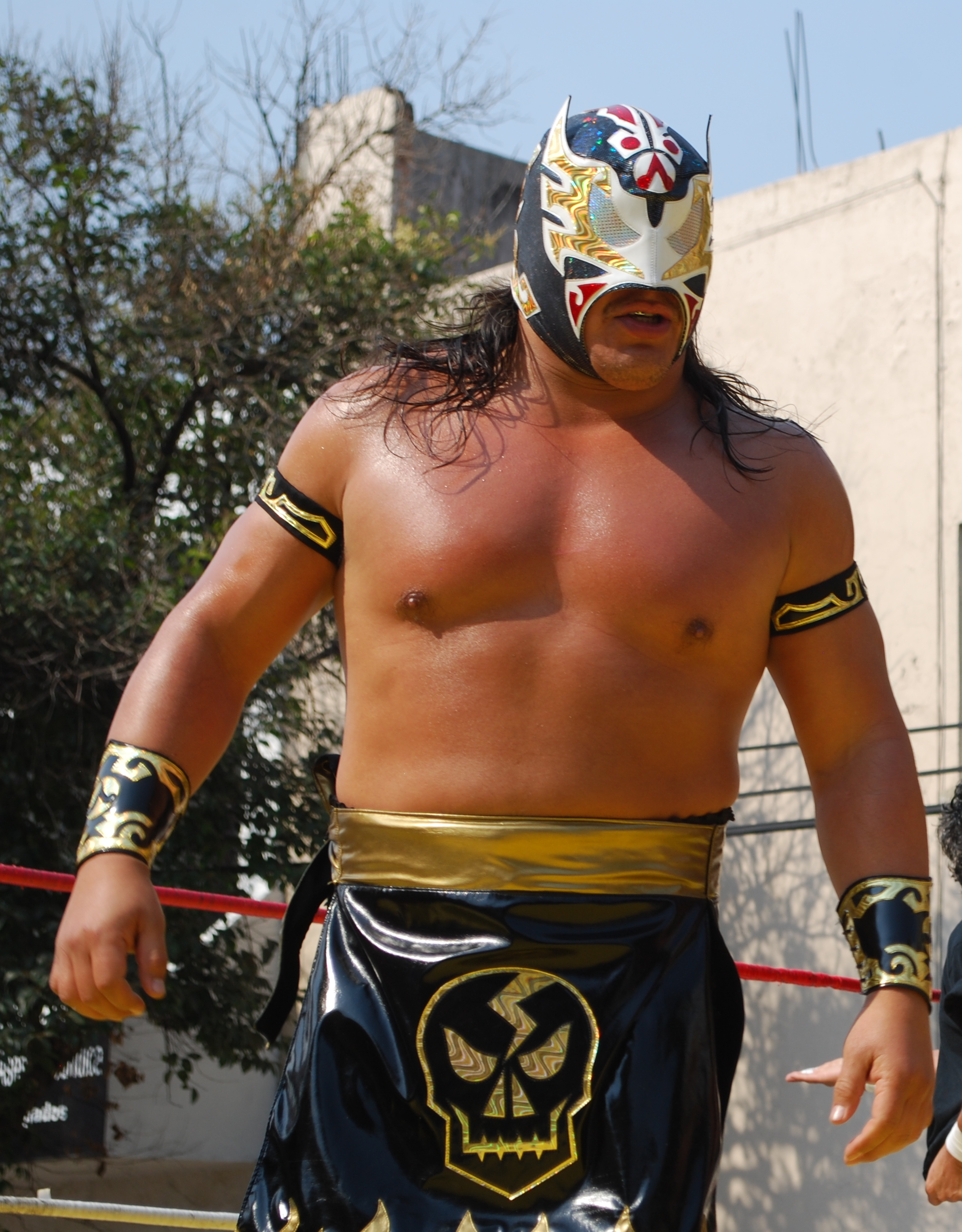
- Último Guerrero, has worked the most Super Viernes shows of 2014 with a total of 40 shows out of 48 possible.

CMLL Super Viernes shows chronology
← Previous; 2013	Next → 2015

CMLL Super Viernes was professional wrestling promotion Consejo Mundial de Lucha Libre's (CMLL) Friday night wrestling show that takes place in Arena México every Friday night unless a Pay-Per-View or a major wrestling event is scheduled to take place on that night. CMLL began holding their weekly Friday night "Super Viernes" shows as far back as 1938 and continued the tradition through 2014 as well. Some of the matches from Super Viernes were taped for CMLL's weekly shows that air in Mexico and the United States on various channels in the weeks following the Super Viernes show. CMLL presented a total of 48 Super Viernes shows. The only Fridays in 2014 to not feature a Super Viernes show was when CMLL held one of their signature events instead, which in 2014 was their annual Homenaje a Dos Leyendas, Juicio Final, CMLL 81st Anniversary Show and Infierno en el Ring. Super Viernes also hosted most of the major CMLL annual tournaments, which in 2014 included the finals of the 2013 Leyenda de Plata, Torneo Gran Alternativa, Torneo De Parejas Increibles, En Busca de un Ídolo, Leyenda de Azul, the Universal Championship and La Copa Junior VIP. The show also features a number of high profile championship matches, which so far in 2014 has included 4 championship matches, the CMLL World Trios Championship and the CMLL World Tag Team Championship changed hands and the CMLL World Tag Team Championship and CMLL World Middleweight Championship were successfully defended on the shows.

The Super Viernes events featured a number of professional wrestling matches, in which some wrestlers were involved in pre-existing scripted feuds or storylines and others were teamed up with no backstory reason as such. Wrestlers themselves portrayed either "Rudos" or fan favorites ("Tecnicos" in Mexico) as they competed in matches with pre-determined outcomes. 2014 the 41 Super Viernes shows so far will have featured 337 matches in total, 290 for the male division, 30 featuring the female division and 17 featuring the Mini-Estrellas. 131 different wrestlers appeared in matches during CMLL's Super Viernes shows. Of those 132 wrestlers 16 were Mini-Estrellas and 18 were women. Último Guerrero wrestled on 40 shows in total, the most of any individual wrestler, which meant he appeared on 83% of all the shows. Marcela was the woman most often featured on Super Viernes with 22 matches, appearing in 74% of the women's matches booked for Super Viernes. Pequeño Olímpico and Último Dragoncito were the Mini-Estrella who had the most appearances, wrestling 8 times in total each, or in 47% of all Mini-Estrella matches. Apocalipsis, Camaleón, Metálico, Inquisidor, Olímpico, Pequeño Universo 2000, Syuri and Zayco all wrestled only on one Super Viernes in 2014. (Note: The statistics are supported by the source for each show.)

== Super Viernes shows of 2014 ==
#	Date	Main Event	Ref(s).
1	January 3	Volador Jr. and Los Estetas del Aire (Máscara Dorada and Valiente) vs. Último Guerrero and Los Hijos del Averno (Averno and Mephisto)	
2	January 10	Atlantis, La Máscara and Máximo vs. Los Hijos del Averno (Averno, Ephesto and Mephisto)	
3	January 17	Atlantis, Shocker and Valiente Vs. La Peste Negra (El Felino, Mr. Niebla and Negro Casas)	
4	January 24	Reaper and Los Guerreros Lagunero (Niebla Roja and Último Guerrero) vs. Volador Jr. and Los Estetas del Aire (Máscara Dorada and Místico)	
5	January 31	Atlantis, La Máscara and Rush Vs. Mr. Niebla, Shocker and Último Guerrero	
6	February 7	Marco Corleone, Thunder and Volador Jr. vs. Los Hijos del Averno (Averno, Ephesto and Mephisto)	
7	February 14	Los Guerreros Laguneros (Euforia, Gran Guerrero and Último Guerrero) Vs. Los Estetas del Aire (Máscara Dorada, Místico and Valiente)	
8	February 21	Shocker and La Peste Negra (El Felino and Negro Casas) Vs. La Tercia Sensacion (Marco Corleone, Máximo and Rush)	
9	February 28	Los Guerreros Laguneros (Euforia, Niebla Roja and Último Guerrero) Vs. Los Estetas del Aire (Máscara Dorada, Místico and Valiente)	
10	March 7	El Terrible, Euforia and Shocker Vs. Atlantis, Marco Corleone and Rush	
11	March 14	Averno and Los Guerreros Lagunero (Gran Guerrero and Último Guerrero) Vs. La Sombra, Valiente and Volador Jr.	
–	March 21	Event replaced with the 2014 Homenaje a Dos Leyendas show.	
12	March 28	Los Guerreros Laguneros (Euforia, Niebla Roja and Último Guerrero) Vs. Los Estetas del Aire (Máscara Dorada, Místico and Valiente)	
13	April 4	Shocker and La Peste Negra (Mr. Niebla and Negro Casas) Vs. Atlantis, La Máscara and Rush	
14	April 11	Máximo, Negro Casas and Volador Jr. Vs. La Sombra, Rey Escorpión and Rush	
15	April 18	Mr. Niebla and Los Invasores (Kraneo and Ripper) Vs. Volador Jr. and Los Estetas del Aire (Místico and Valiente)	
16	April 25	Shocker and La Peste Negra (Mr. Niebla and Negro Casas) Vs. La Máscara, La Sombra and Rush	
17	May 2	Ripper and La Peste Negra (Mr. Niebla and Negro Casas) Vs. Los Indeseables (La Máscara, La Sombra and Rush)	
18	May 9	Atlantis, Máscara Dorada and Volador Jr. Vs. Los Guerreros Laguneros (Gran Guerrero, Niebla Roja and Último Guerrero)	
19	May 16	Marco Corleone, Máximo and Volador Jr. Vs. Shocker and Los Revolucionarios del Terror (Dragón Rojo Jr. and Rey Escorpión)	
20	May 23	Atlantis, Shocker and Volador Jr. Vs. Último Guerrero and Los Indeseables (La Sombra and Rush)	
21	May 30	Negro Casas, Shocker and Volador Jr. Vs. Los Indeseables (La Máscara, La Sombra and Rush)	
22	June 6	La Sombra vs. Volador Jr.	
23	June 13	Los Ingobernables (La Mascara and Rush) vs. Shocker and Negro Casas	
24	June 20	Leyenda de Azul 2014	
25	June 27	Atlantis, Mr. Niebla and Shocker vs. Último Guerrero and Los Ingobernables (La Sombra and Rush)	
26	July 4	Los Ingobernables (La Mascara, La Sombra and Rush) vs. Shocker and La Peste Negra (Mr. Niebla and Negro Casas)	
27	July 11	La Sombra vs. Shocker	
28	July 18	Los Ingobernables (La Sombra and Rush) vs. Shocker and Negro Casas	
29	July 25	Volador Jr. and La Peste Negra (Mr. Niebla and Negro Casas) defeated Los Ingobernables (La Máscara, La Sombra and Rush)	
–	August 1	Event replaced with the 2014 Juicio Final show.	
30	August 8	Negro Casas, Shocker and Último Guerrero vs. Los Ingobernables (La Mascara, La Sombra and Rush)	
31	August 15	Atlantis, Diamante Azul and Marco Corleone vs. Los Guerreros Laguneros (Gran Guerrero, Niebla Roja and Último Guerrero)	
32	August 22	Los Ingobernables (La Mascara, La Sombra and Rush) vs. Negro Casas, Rey Escorpión and Shocker	
33	August 29	Último Guerrero vs. La Sombra	
34	September 5	Los Ingobernables (La Máscara, La Sombra and Rush) vs. La Peste Negra (El Felino, Mr. Niebla and Negro Casas)	
35	September 12	Diamante Azul and Los Ingobernables (La Máscara and Rush) vs. Shocker and La Peste Negra (Mr. Niebla and Negro Casas)	
–	September 19	Event replaced with CMLL 81st Anniversary Show.	
36	September 26	Último Guerrero and La Peste Negra (Mr. Niebla and Negro Casas) Vs. Atlantis, Máscara Dorada and Valiente	
37	October 3	Diamante Azul, La Máscara and Volador Jr. vs. Mephisto, Thunder and Último Guerrero	
38	October 10	Los Ingobernables (La Máscara, La Sombra and Rush) vs. Thunder and Los Guerreros Lagunero (Euforia and Último Guerrero)	
39	October 17	Los Ingobernables (La Máscara, La Sombra and Rush) vs. Los Guerreros Lagunero (Gran Guerrero, Niebla Roja and Último Guerrero)	
40	October 24	Los Ingobernables (La Máscara, La Sombra and Rush) vs. Los Guerreros Lagunero (Gran Guerrero, Niebla Roja and Último Guerrero)	
41	October 31	Rush vs. Último Guerrero	
42	November 7	Los Ingobernables (La Máscara, La Sombra and Rush) vs. Thunder and Los Guerreros Lagunero (Euforia and Último Guerrero)	
43	November 14	Marco Corleone and Los Ingobernables (La Máscara and La Sombra) vs. Thunder and Los Guerreros Lagunero (Euforia and Último Guerrero)	
44	November 21	Atlantis, Valiente and Volador Jr. vs. Thunder and Los Guerreros Lagunero (Euforia and Último Guerrero)	
45	November 28	Atlantis, La Máscara and Volador Jr. vs. El Terrible, Thunder and Último Guerrero	
–	December 5	Event replaced with the 2014 Infierno el en Ring major event	
46	December 12	Los Ingobernables (Marco Corleone, La Máscara and La Sombra) vs. Shocker, Thunder and Último Guerrero	
47	December 19	Atlantis, Máximo and Volador Jr. vs. Shocker and TRT: La Máquina de la Destrucción (Rey Bucanero and El Terrible)	
48	December 26	Máximo, Valiente and Volador Jr. vs. Mr. Niebla, Rey Bucanero and Shocker	
