= CMLL Super Viernes (August 2014) =

Mexican professional wrestling show summary

August started out with the Mexican professional wrestling promotion Consejo Mundial de Lucha Libre (CMLL) holding a special major event called Juicio Final on Friday August 1 instead of their traditional Friday night CMLL Super Viernes show, but for the remaining four Fridays they held their traditional Super Viernes show, CMLL's main weekly show. The shows focused both on continuing storylines from Juicio Final as well as storylines building interest for their next show, the CMLL 81st Anniversary Show. At the Juicio Final show long time rivals Atlantis and Último Guerrero finally agreed to a Lucha de Apuestas, or bet match, for their wrestling masks, which they promoted as La Lucha del siglo ("The match of the century"). The shows also furthered issues between the trio known as Los Ingobernables ("The Unruly"; La Máscara, La Sombra and Rush) and their continuing rivalry with Negro Casas and his team known as La Peste Negra (El Felino and Mr. Niebla) as well as Shocker building towards a match at the 81st Anniversary Show. The August 8 Super Viernes featured the only championship match of the month as Dragón Rojo Jr. successfully defended the CMLL World Middleweight Championship against rival Rey Escorpión, continuing the feud between the two that started when Dragón Rojo Jr. left a group known as Los Revolucionarios del Terror, a group led by Rey Escorpión. August also saw the annual Universal Championship return as CMLL held the two first rounds on the 15th and 22nd. Former Universal Champions La Sombra and Último Guerrero both qualified for the finals and in the end Guerrero won, making him the first ever two time Universal Champion, The August 22, 2014 Super Viernes marked the first Super Viernes show where El Sagrado worked as a heel (referred to as a "Rudo" in Mexico (a "bad guy" character) when he teamed up with Misterioso Jr. and El Terrible, losing to the team of Blue Panther, Rey Cometa and Sagrado's rival Fuego.

The Super Viernes events featured a number of professional wrestling matches, in which some wrestlers were involved in pre-existing scripted feuds or storylines and others were teamed up with no backstory reason as such. Wrestlers themselves portrayed either "Rudos" or fan favorites ("Tecnicos" in Mexico) as they competed in matches with pre-determined outcomes. In total Super Viernes featured 38 matches. 74 wrestlers appeared in matches during August, including 8 women and 8 Mini-Estrellas wrestlers. CMLL held two matches featuring the women's division, two featuring the Mini-Estrellas and no Lightning matches. Dragón Rojo Jr., La Sombra, Máscara Dorada, Negro Casas, Rey Escorpión and Último Guerrero appeared on all four Super Viernes shows in August.

== August 1, 2014 ==
On August 1, 2014 Consejo Mundial de Lucha Libre (CMLL) held a special Jucio Final ("Final Justice") event instead of their traditional Friday night Super Viernes show.

== August 8, 2014 ==
CMLL Super Viernes
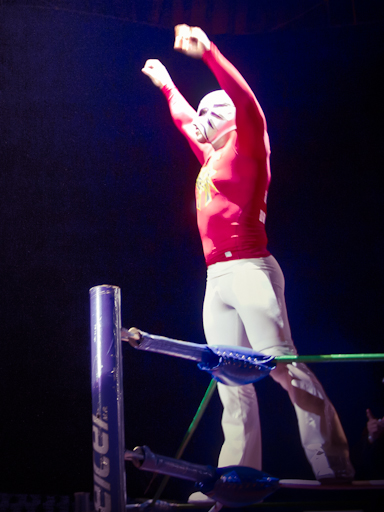
- La Máscara, part of Los Ingobernables
- Promotion: Consejo Mundial de Lucha Libre
- Date: August 8, 2014
- City: Mexico City, Mexico
- Venue: Arena México

Event chronology
← Previous; Juicio Final (2014)	Next → Super Viernes August 15, 2014

CMLL Super Viernes chronology
← Previous; Super Viernes July 25, 2014	Next → Super Viernes August 15, 2014

Mexican professional wrestling promotion held their weekly Super Vierenes show on August 8, 2014, following up on events and fall-out from their major event, El Juicio Final ("Final Justice") the previous week. The show featured six matches in total, including Negro Casas' first Arena México match after being shaved bald the prior week. Casas had lost a high-profile Lucha de Apuestas, or "bet match" to rival Rush and as a result was forced to have all his hair shaved off. In the main event of the August 8 Super Viernes Negro Casas teamed up with Último Guerrero and Shocker to take on the Rush led trio known as Los Ingobernables, which also included La Máscara and La Sombra. The match was contested under Six-man "Lucha Libre rules" tag team match with each team quickly winning a fall before the third and deciding fall. In the end the bald Casas, Shocker (who had also lost his hair to Rush) and Último Guerrero defeated the Los Ingobernables trio to gain a small measure of revenge.

Another feature match on the show centered around a several-month-long storyline between Dragón Rojo Jr. and Rey Escorpión. Up until recently Dragón Rojo Jr. had been a member of Los Revolucionarios del Terror ("The Revolutionaries of Terror") led by Rey Escorpión but after a falling out between the two Dragón Rojo Jr. changed alignment and became a tecnico (wrestling term for the "good guys"), becoming the rival of Rey Escorpión. The two had faced off numerous times on opposite sides of six-man tag team matches, including a match at Juicio Final where Rey Escorpión, Shocker and Último Guerrero had defeated Dragón Rojo Jr., Atlantis and Máscara Dorada. On August 8, 2014, Dragón Rojo Jr. put his CMLL World Middleweight Championship on the line against Rey Escorpión in a Best two-out-of-three falls match between the two. In the end Dragón Rojo Jr. proved successful on the night, defeating his rival two falls to one, keeping his championship safe. The third match of the night also features a Juicio Final rematch of sorts as La Seductora worked her first match unmasked after having lost it to the team of Marcela and Princesa Sujei a week prior. Goya Kong, Marcela and Princes Sujei proved successful, defeating La Seductora, La Amapola and Zeuxis two falls to one.

=== August 8, 2014 Results ===
No.	Results	Stipulations
1	Mercurio and Pequeño Olímpico defeated Shockercito and Stukita – two falls to one	Tag team best-two-out-of-three falls match
2	Dragon Lee and Los Reyes de la Atlantida (Delta and Guerrero Maya Jr.) defeated Arkangel de la Muerte and Los Cancerberos del Infierno (Cancerbero and Raziel) – two falls to one	Six-man "Lucha Libre rules" tag team match
3	Goya Kong, Marcela and Princesa Sujei defeated La Amapola, La Seductora and Zeuxis	Six-woman "Lucha Libre rules" tag team match
4	Máscara Dorada, Valiente and Volador Jr. defeated Hechicero and Los Hijos del Averno (Ephesto and Mephisto) – two falls to one	Six-man "Lucha Libre rules" tag team match
5	Dragón Rojo Jr. (C) defeated Rey Escorpión – two falls to one	Best two-out-of-three falls match for the CMLL World Middleweight Championship
6	Negro Casas, Shocker and Último Guerrero defeated Los Ingobernables (La Máscara, La Sombra and Rush) – two falls to one	Six-man "Lucha Libre rules" tag team match

== August 15, 2014 ==
CMLL Super Viernes
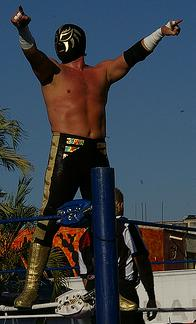
- La Sombra, qualified for the finals of the 2014 Universal Championship tournament
- Promotion: Consejo Mundial de Lucha Libre
- Date: August 15, 2014
- City: Mexico City, Mexico
- Venue: Arena México

CMLL Super Viernes chronology
← Previous; Super Viernes August 8, 2014	Next → Super Viernes August 22, 2014

The August 15, 2014 Super Viernes professional wrestling show hosted the beginning of Mexican wrestling promotion Consejo Mundial de Lucha Libre (CMLL)'s annual Universal Championship tournament, a tradition dating back to 2009. The tournament featured 16 CMLL champions with two qualifying rounds of eight to determine who would move on to the finals. Each qualifying block consisted of seven one-fall singles matches in an elimination match format to determine a finalist. For these types of tournaments CMLL usually starts out with an eight-man Battle Royal, booked to give a senese of randomness in the first round pairs. The Battle Royal determines the order with the first two wrestlers eliminating facing off in the first match of the first round, the third and fourth man eliminated would face off in the second match, the fifth and sixth man eliminated would face off in the third match and the remaining two wrestlers, the winners of the Battle Royal, would face off in the fourth and final first round match of the night. The tournament itself took up eight of the thirteen matches on the show and ended with La Sombra pinning Shocker to advance to the tournament finals two weeks later.

The main event of the August 15 show was the first in-ring meeting of Atlantis and Último Guerrero after they finally got approval to both put their masks on the line in a Lucha de Apuestas or bet match that would be the main event of the CMLL 81st Anniversary Show. The match would be the culmination of a long running storyline rivalry between the two with the August 15 match service to further the tension between the two. Atlantis teamed up with Diamante Azul and Marco Corleone to face and defeat Guerrero and his Los Guerreros Laguneros team that also included Gran Guerrero and Niebla Roja, two falls to one.

Block A Champions
Participant	Championship held
Euforia	CMLL World Trios Championship
El Felino	Mexican National Trios Championship
Mephisto	Mexican National Light Heavyweight Championship
Negro Casas	CMLL World Tag Team Championship; Mexican National Trios Championship
Rey Escorpión	CMLL World Light Heavyweight Championship
Shocker	CMLL World Tag Team Championship
La Sombra	NWA World Historic Middleweight Championship
El Terrible	CMLL World Heavyweight Championship

=== August 15, 2014 Results ===
No.	Results	Stipulations
1	Pegasso and Star Jr. defeated Disturbio and Guerrero Negro Jr.	Tag team best-two-out-of-three falls match
2	Cachorro, Dragon Lee and Tritón defeated Boby Zavala, Skándalo and Virus – two falls to none	Six-man "Lucha Libre rules" tag team match
3	Bárbaro Cavernario, Hombre sin Nombre and Vangelis defeated Ángel de Oro, Rey Cometa and Stuka Jr. – two falls to one	Six-man "Lucha Libre rules" tag team match
4	Dragón Rojo Jr., Máscara Dorada and Volador Jr. defeated Ephesto, Pólvora and Rey Bucanero – two falls to one	Six-man "Lucha Libre rules" tag team match
5	Mephisto and Negro Casas defeated Euforia, El Felino, Rey Escorpión, Shocker, La Sombra and El Terrible	Universal Championship Block A seeding Battle Royal
6	Euforia defeated El Terrible	2014 Universal Championship tournament first round match
7	Shocker defeated El Felino	2014 Universal Championship tournament first round match
8	La Sombra defeated Rey Escorpión	2014 Universal Championship tournament first round match
9	Negro Casas defeated Mephisto	2014 Universal Championship tournament first round match
10	Shocker defeated Euforia	2014 Universal Championship tournament quarterfinal match
11	La Sombra defeated Negro Casas	2014 Universal Championship tournament quarterfinal match
12	La Sombra defeated Shocker	2014 Universal Championship tournament semi-final match
13	Atlantis, Diamante Azul and Marco Corleone defeated Los Guerreros Laguneros (Gran Guerrero, Niebla Roja and Último Guerrero) by DQ – two falls to one	Six-man "Lucha Libre rules" tag team match

Universal Tournament Block A

Quarterfinals
Euforia	Pin
El Terrible
El Felino	Sub
Shocker
Rey Escorpión	Pin
La Sombra
Mephisto	Sub
Negro Casas

Semifinals
Euforia	Pin
Shocker
La Sombra	Pin
Negro Casas

Finals
Shocker	Pin
La Sombra

== August 22, 2014 ==
CMLL Super Viernes
- Official poster for Block B of the Universal Championship tournament
- Promotion: Consejo Mundial de Lucha Libre
- Date: August 22, 2014
- City: Mexico City, Mexico
- Venue: Arena México

CMLL Super Viernes chronology
← Previous; Super Viernes August 15, 2014	Next → Super Viernes August 29, 2014

The August 21, 2014 Super Viernes professional wrestling show hosted the second round of Mexican wrestling promotion Consejo Mundial de Lucha Libre (CMLL)'s annual Universal Championship tournament, a tradition dating back to 2009. The tournament featured 16 CMLL champions with two qualifying rounds of eight to determine who would move on to the finals. Each qualifying block consisted of seven one-fall singles matches in an elimination match format to determine a finalist. For these types of tournaments CMLL usually starts out with an eight-man Battle Royal, booked to give a senese of randomness in the first round pairs. The Battle Royal determines the order with the first two wrestlers eliminating facing off in the first match of the first round, the third and fourth man eliminated would face off in the second match, the fifth and sixth man eliminated would face off in the third match and the remaining two wrestlers, the winners of the Battle Royal, would face off in the fourth and final first round match of the night. The tournament itself took up eight of the thirteen matches on the show and ended with Último Guerrero defeating Volador Jr. to advance to the tournament final the following week.

The main event match was another chapter in a long running storyline feud between the group known as Los Ingobernables ("The Unruly"; La Máscara, La Sombra and Rush) and the reigning CMLL World Tag Team Champions Negro Casas and Shocker, who teamed up with Rey Escorpión for the match. Los Ingorbernables was a group that did not conform to the stricter tecnico definition that CMLL traditionally uses, referring to themselves as tecnico diferents, wrestling a rougher style and not playing to the crowd for cheers during their matches. Shocker and Negro Casas has defeated Rush and La Máscara to win the titles on a past Super Viernes and Rush had defeated both Shocker and Negro Casas in high-profile Lucha de Apuestas, or bet matches, forcing them both to have their hair shaved off as a result. On the night Los Ingobernables defeated the champions and Rey Escorpión two falls to one and Rush & La Máscara would receive a title opportunity at the CMLL 81st Anniversary Show as the storyline developed.

Block B Champions
Participant	Championship held
Diamante Azul	NWA World Historic Light Heavyweight Championship
Dragón Rojo Jr.	CMLL World Middleweight Championship
Mr. Niebla	Mexican National Trios Championship
Niebla Roja	CMLL World Trios Championship
Titán	Mexican National Welterweight Championship
Último Guerrero	CMLL World Trios Championship
Virus	CMLL World Lightweight Championship
Volador Jr.	NWA World Historic Welterweight Championship

=== August 22, 2014 Results ===
No.	Results	Stipulations
1	Demus 3:16 and Pierrothito defeated Eléctrico and Último Dragóncito – two falls to one	Tag team best-two-out-of-three falls match
2	Dark Angel, La Vaquerita and Princesa Sujei defeated La Amapola, Dalys la Caribeña and La Seductora – two falls to one	Six-man "Lucha Libre rules" tag team match
3	Blue Panther, Fuego and Rey Cometa defeated Misterioso Jr., El Sagrado and El Terrible – two falls to one	Six-man "Lucha Libre rules" tag team match
4	Atlantis, Máscara Dorada and Máximo defeated Bárbaro Cavernario, Euforia and Mephisto – two falls to one	Six-man "Lucha Libre rules" tag team match
5	Titán and Volador Jr. defeated Diamante Azul, Dragón Rojo Jr., Mr. Niebla, Niebla Roja, Último Guerrero and Virus	Universal Championship Block B seeding Battle Royal
6	Último Guerrero defeated Mr. Niebla	2014 Universal Championship tournament first round match
7	Dragón Rojo Jr. defeated Virus	2014 Universal Championship tournament first round match
8	Diamante Azul defeated Niebla Roja	2014 Universal Championship tournament first round match
9	Volador Jr. defeated Titán	2014 Universal Championship tournament first round match
10	Último Guerrero defeated Dragón Rojo Jr.	2014 Universal Championship tournament quarterfinal match
11	Volador Jr. defeated Diamante Azul	2014 Universal Championship tournament quarterfinal match
12	Último Guerrero defeated Volador Jr.	2014 Universal Championship tournament semi-final match
13	Los Ingobernables (La Máscara, La Sombra and Rush) defeated Negro Casas, Rey Escorpión and Shocker – two falls to one	Six-man "Lucha Libre rules" tag team match

Universal Tournament Block B

Quarterfinals
Mr. Niebla	Pin
Último Guerrero
Dragón Rojo Jr.	Sub
Virus
Diamante Azul	Pin
Niebla Roja
Titán	Pin
Volador Jr.

Semifinals
Último Guerrero	Pin
Dragón Rojo Jr.
Diamante Azul	Pin
Volador Jr.

Finals
Último Guerrero	Pin
Volador Jr.

== August 29, 2014 ==
CMLL Super Viernes
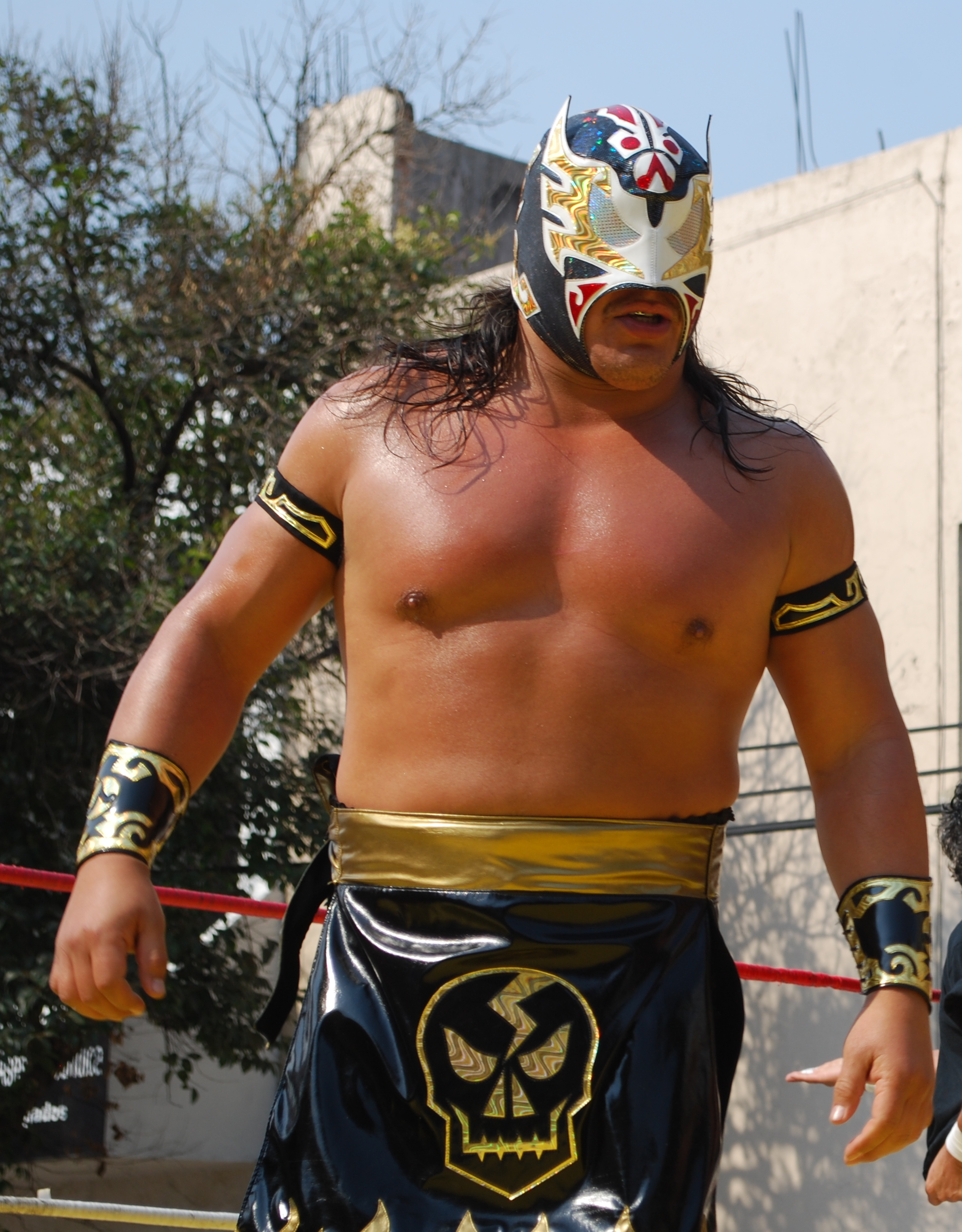
- Último Guerrero, the 2014 Universal Champion
- Promotion: Consejo Mundial de Lucha Libre
- Date: August 29, 2014
- City: Mexico City, Mexico
- Venue: Arena México

CMLL Super Viernes chronology
← Previous; Super Viernes August 22, 2014	Next → Super Viernes September 5, 2014

The August 29, 2014 Super Viernes professional wrestling show hosted the finals of Mexican wrestling promotion Consejo Mundial de Lucha Libre's (CMLL) annual Universal Championship tournament. In previous weeks Último Guerrero and La Sombra had both won their qualifying round to head to the finals of the tournament. Guerrero had previously won the 2009 Universal Championship tournament and La Sombra had won the 2011 tournament, which meant that for the first time ever there would be a two time winner of the Universal Championship. Both Guerrero and La Sombra had been involved in separate storylines up until this point, Último Guerrero continued his several-years long feud with Atlantis while La Sombra had been part of an emerging group known as Los Ingobernables that had headlined a large number of CMLL shows in 2014. The tournament finals was the only tournament match to be contested under "best two-out-of-three falls" rules and saw Último Guerrero win the first and third fall to become the first ever two time Universal Championship tournament winner. In the second to last match of the night long time rivals Negro Casas and Rush found themselves on opposite sides of a Six-man tag team match as they clashed to carry on the feud that had seen Negro Casas shaved bald less than a month ago and Casas and partner Shocker defeat Rush and La Máscara to win the CMLL World Tag Team Championship. Another issue in the semi-main event was the ongoing storyline between former partners Rey Escorpión and Dragón Rojo Jr. that began when Dragón Rojo Jr. decided to leave the Rey Escorpión led Los Revolucionarios del Terror ("The Revolutionaries of Terror") a few months prior. The betrayal led to an ongoing rivalry between the two, a rivalry that had already seen Dragón Rojo Jr. successfully defend the CMLL World Middleweight Championship against his Rey Escorpión on the August 8 Super Viernes show. Casas and Rey Escorpión were joined by Niebla Roja as they took on Rush, Dragón Rojo Jr. and Atlantis, defeating the trio by disqualification when Rush caused his team to lose after a low blow on Casas. The fourth match of the night was used to showcase a quickly developing feud between Rey Cometa and Cavernario, a storyline that would lead to a featured match on the CMLL 81st Anniversary Show only a few weeks later. Rey Cometa, Máscara Dorada and Valiente took on the group known as La Peste Negra ("The Black Plague"; Cavernario, El Felino and Mr. Niebla). In the third and deciding fall La Peste Negra's disregard for the rules got the team disqualified for excessive violence on Rey Cometa.

=== August 29, 2014 Results ===
No.	Results	Stipulations
1	Disturbio and Guerrero Negro Jr. defeated Soberano Jr. and Star Jr.	Tag team best-two-out-of-three falls match
2	Puma and La Fiebre Amarilla (Kamaitachi and Okumura) defeated Cachorro, Dragon Lee and Pegasso – two falls to one	Six-man "Lucha Libre rules" tag team match
3	Ángel de Oro, Blue Panther and Fuego defeated El Sagrado, Hombre sin Nombre and Comandante Pierroth – two falls to one	Six-man "Lucha Libre rules" tag team match
4	Máscara Dorada, Rey Cometa and Valiente defeated La Peste Negra (Bárbaro Cavernario, El Felino and Mr. Niebla) by disqualification	Six-man "Lucha Libre rules" tag team match
5	Negro Casas, Niebla Roja and Rey Escorpión defeated Atlantis, Dragón Rojo Jr. and Rush by DQ – two falls to one	Six-man "Lucha Libre rules" tag team match
6	Último Guerrero defeated La Sombra – two falls to one	Campeon Universal Del CMLL 2014 tournament final best two-out-of-three falls match

== August 2014 Super Viernes Competitors ==
Name	Shows	Dates
Ángel de Oro	2	August 15, 2014, August 29, 2014
La Amapola	2	August 8, 2014, August 22, 2014
Arkangel de la Muerte	1	August 8, 2014
Atlantis	3	August 15, 2014, August 22, 2014, August 29, 2014
Blue Panther	2	August 22, 2014, August 29, 2014
Cachorro	2	August 15, 2014, August 29, 2014
Cancerbero	1	August 8, 2014
Negro Casas	4	August 8, 2014, August 15, 2014, August 22, 2014, August 29, 2014
Bárbaro Cavernario	3	August 15, 2014, August 22, 2014, August 29, 2014
Comandante Pierroth	1	August 29, 2014
Marco Corleone	1	August 15, 2014
Dalys la Caribeña	1	August 22, 2014
Dark Angel	1	August 22, 2014
Delta	1	August 8, 2014
Demus 3:16	1	August 22, 2014
Diamante Azul	2	August 15, 2014, August 22, 2014
Disturbio	2	August 15, 2014, August 29, 2014
Dragon Lee	3	August 8, 2014, August 15, 2014, August 29, 2014
Dragón Rojo Jr.	4	August 8, 2014, August 15, 2014, August 22, 2014, August 29, 2014
Eléctrico	1	August 22, 2014
Ephesto	2	August 8, 2014, August 15, 2014
Euforia	2	August 15, 2014, August 22, 2014
El Felino	2	August 15, 2014, August 29, 2014
Fuego	2	August 22, 2014, August 29, 2014
Goya Kong	1	August 8, 2014
Gran Guerrero	1	August 15, 2014
Guerrero Maya Jr.	1	August 8, 2014
Guerrero Negro Jr.	2	August 15, 2014, August 29, 2014
Hechicero	1	August 8, 2014
Hombre sin Nombre	2	August 15, 2014, August 29, 2014
Kamaitachi	1	August 29, 2014
Marcela	1	August 8, 2014
La Máscara	2	August 8, 2014, August 22, 2014
Máscara Dorada	4	August 8, 2014, August 15, 2014, August 22, 2014, August 29, 2014
Máximo	1	August 22, 2014
Mephisto	3	August 8, 2014, August 15, 2014, August 22, 2014
Mercurio	1	August 8, 2014
Misterioso Jr.	1	August 22, 2014
Mr. Niebla	2	August 22, 2014, August 29, 2014
Niebla Roja	3	August 15, 2014, August 22, 2014, August 29, 2014
Okumura	1	August 29, 2014
Pegasso	2	August 15, 2014, August 29, 2014
Pequeño Olímpico	1	August 8, 2014
Pierrothito	1	August 22, 2014
Pólvora	1	August 15, 2014
Princesa Sujei	2	August 8, 2014, August 22, 2014
Puma	1	August 29, 2014
Raziel	1	August 8, 2014
Rey Bucanero	1	August 15, 2014
Rey Cometa	3	August 15, 2014, August 22, 2014, August 29, 2014
Rey Escorpión	4	August 8, 2014, August 15, 2014, August 22, 2014, August 29, 2014
Rush	3	August 8, 2014, August 22, 2014, August 29, 2014
El Sagrado	2	August 22, 2014, August 29, 2014
La Seductora	2	August 8, 2014, August 22, 2014
Shocker	3	August 8, 2014, August 15, 2014, August 22, 2014
Shockercito	1	August 8, 2014
Skándalo	1	August 15, 2014
Soberano Jr.	1	August 29, 2014
La Sombra	4	August 8, 2014, August 15, 2014, August 22, 2014, August 29, 2014
Star Jr.	2	August 15, 2014, August 29, 2014
Stuka Jr.	1	August 15, 2014
Stukita	1	August 8, 2014
El Terrible	2	August 15, 2014, August 22, 2014
Titán	1	August 22, 2014
Tritón	1	August 15, 2014
Último Dragóncito	1	August 22, 2014
Último Guerrero	4	August 8, 2014, August 15, 2014, August 29, 2014, August 22, 2014
Valiente	2	August 8, 2014, August 29, 2014
Vangelis	1	August 15, 2014
La Vaquerita	1	August 22, 2014
Virus	2	August 15, 2014, August 22, 2014
Volador Jr.	3	August 8, 2014, August 15, 2014, August 22, 2014
Boby Zavala	1	August 15, 2014
Zeuxis	1	August 8, 2014
