= CMLL Super Viernes (September 2014) =

In September 2014 Mexican professional wrestling promotion Consejo Mundial de Lucha Libre (CMLL) held three CMLL Super Viernes shows on Friday nights. On September 19 they replaced the regular Friday night show with their 81st Anniversary Show, CMLL's biggest show of the year and the culmination of a number of storylines built up in the previous weeks or months. Some of the matches from Super Viernes are taped for CMLL's weekly shows that air on television in Mexico in the following week. The first two Super Viernes shows focused primarily on the build towards the 81st Anniversary show, especially the Lucha de Apuestas, mask vs. mask match main event of the show between Atlantis and Último Guerrero that would be the culmination of a storyline years in the making. It was also used to feature a quickly escalating storyline between Rey Cometa and Cavernario, leading up to one of the featured matches at the Anniversary Show. The post anniversary Super Viernes show featured the first round of the La Copa Junior VIP tournament, the second such tournament of 2014, this time featuring higher ranking wrestlers than the January 1, 2014 version. The tournament would continue into October 2014.

The Super Viernes events featured a number of professional wrestling matches, in which some wrestlers were involved in pre-existing scripted feuds or storylines and others were teamed up with no backstory reason as such. Wrestlers themselves portrayed either villains (referred to as "Rudos" in Mexico) or fan favorites ("Tecnicos" in Mexico) as they competed in matches with pre-determined outcomes. In total Super Viernes featured 24 matches, 6 matches each on September 5 and 12 and 12 matches total on September 27 due to the La Copa Junior tournament starting that week. 64 wrestlers appeared in matches during September, including six women and four Mini-Estrellas wrestlers. CMLL held one match featuring the women's division, one featuring the Mini-Etrellas and one Lightning match. Fuego, La Máscara, Mr. Niebla, Negro Casas, Último Guerrero, Valiente and Volador Jr. all appeared on all three Super Viernes shows in September and all but Fuego also worked the 81st Anniversary Show.

== September 5, 2014 ==
CMLL Super Viernes
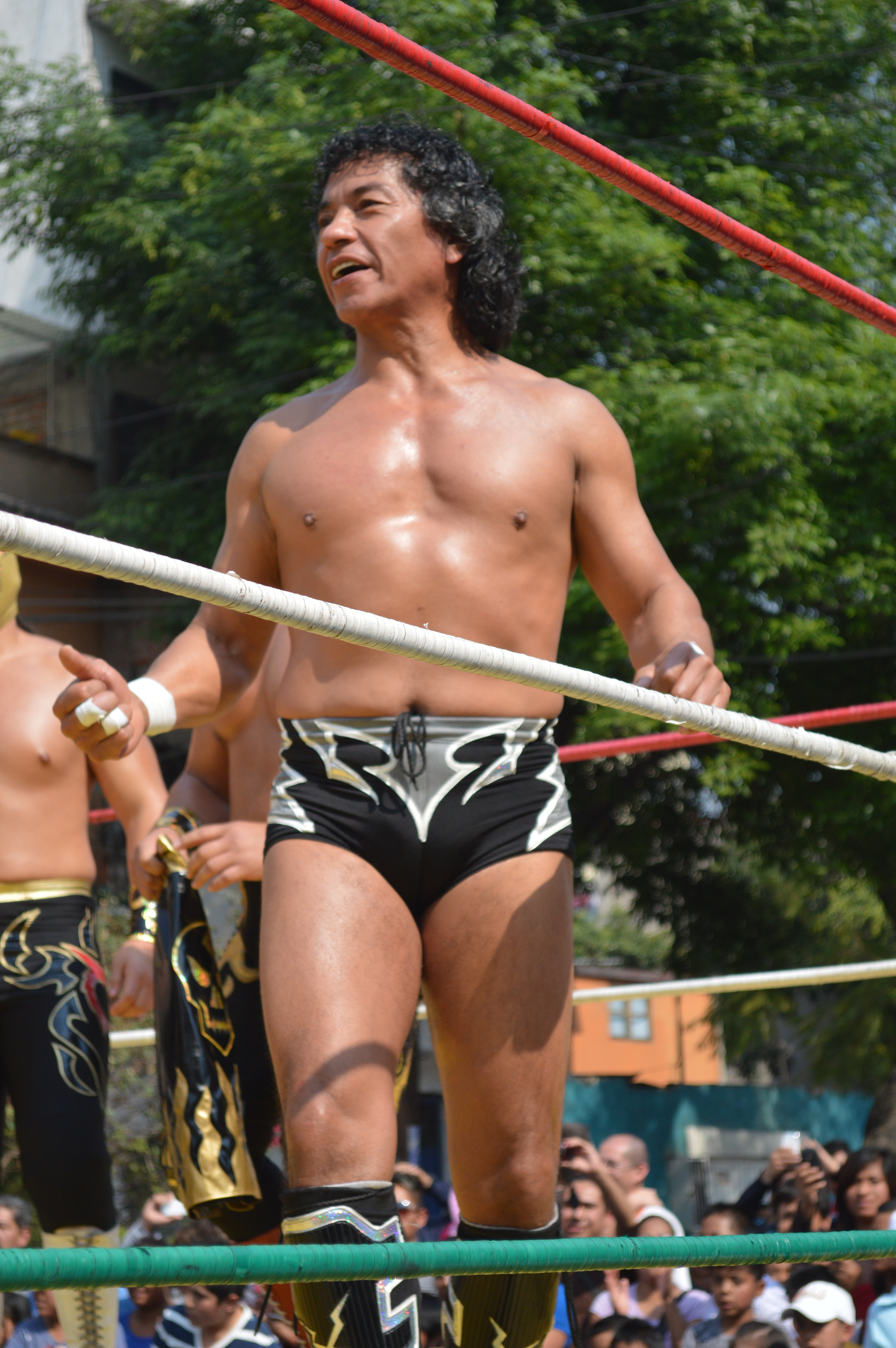
- Negro Casas, worked the main event of the September 5th show.
- Promotion: Consejo Mundial de Lucha Libre (CMLL)
- Date: September 5, 2014
- City: Mexico City, Mexico
- Venue: Arena México

CMLL Super Viernes chronology
← Previous; Super Viernes August 29, 2014	Next → Super Viernes September 12, 2014

The September 5, 2014 Super Viernes was a professional wrestling event held by Consejo Mundial de Lucha Libre (CMLL) in their home arena Arena Mexico, the promotion's main weekly show. The focal point of the September 5 edition was the buildup of the storylines going into CMLL's 81st Anniversary Show only two weeks later to get spectators to attend the actual anniversary show. The show furthered the storyline of three of the matches on the Anniversary Show. The Anniversary Main event between Atlanis and Último Guerrero saw Guerrero team up with his son Gran Guerrero and Rey Escorpión to defeat Atlantis, Dragón Rojo, Jr. and Volador Jr. in the semi-main event of the night. The team of Negro Casas and Shocker were slated to defend the CMLL World Tag Team Championship against the Los Ingobernables (The Unruly") team of La Máscara and Rush two weeks later, to which end Los Ingobernables, including La Sombra defeated the tag team champions and Mr. Niebla in the main event. The fourth match of the night, a one fall, 10 minute match, Barbaro Cavernario wrestled rival Rey Cometa to a 10-minute time limit draw. Following the match challenges were laid out for a Lucha de Apuestas, or bet match for the Anniversary Show. The match was agreed to and was later announced that both Cavernario and Rey Cometa would put their hair on the line of the outcome of their match at the 81st Anniversary show.

After the semi-main event Australian wrestler Thunder made a surprise appearance after not being seen for approximately seven months. Thunder proceeded to turnerudo by attacking Volador Jr., throwing him outside the ring. To underscore the severity of the attack CMLL organized to have Volador Jr. taken from the arena on a stretch afterwards. The following day it was announced that Thunder would appear at the 81st Anniversary Show, teaming with Mr. Niebla and Euforia to fight Volador Jr., Máscara Dorada and Valiente.

=== September 5, 2014 Results ===
No.	Results	Stipulations	Times
1	Hombre Bala Jr., Pegasso and Super Halcón Jr. defeated Canelo Casas and Los Hombres del Camoflaje (Artillero and Super Comando) – two falls to one	Six-man "Lucha Libre rules" tag team match	—
2	El Sexy Team (Dark Angel, Estrelita and Goya Kong) defeated La Comandante, Tiffany and Zeuxis – two falls to one	Six-woman "Lucha Libre rules" tag team match	—
3	TRT: La Máquina de la Destrucción (El Terrible, Rey Bucanero and Vangelis) defeated Brazo de Plata, Fuego and Stuka, Jr. – two falls to one	Six-man "Lucha Libre rules" tag team match	—
4	Barbaro Cavernario vs. Rey Cometa ended in a time limit draw	Lightning match (One fall, 10 minute time-limit match)	10:00
5	Rey Escorpión and Los Guerreros Laguneros (Gran Guerrero and Último Guerrero) defeated Atlantis, Dragón Rojo, Jr. and Volador Jr. – two falls to one	Six-man "Lucha Libre rules" tag team match	—
6	Los Ingobernables (La Máscara, La Sombra and Rush) defeated La Peste Negra (El Felino, Mr. Niebla and Negro Casas) – two falls to one	Six-man "Lucha Libre rules" tag team match	—

== September 12, 2014 ==
CMLL Super Viernes
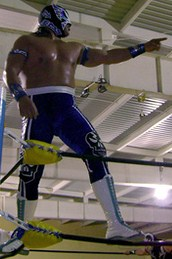
- Último Guerrero, made his last Super Viernes appearance before losing his mask
- Promotion: Consejo Mundial de Lucha Libre (CMLL)
- Date: September 12, 2014
- City: Mexico City, Mexico
- Venue: Arena México

Event chronology
← Previous; Super Viernes September 5, 2014	Next → CMLL 81st Anniversary Show

CMLL Super Viernes chronology
← Previous; Super Viernes September 5, 2014	Next → Super Viernes September 26, 2014

On September 12, 2014 Consejo Mundial de Lucha Libre (CMLL) held their weekly Super Viernes professional wrestling at their home arena Arena Mexico, presenting an event focused on continuing various storylines leading up to the CMLL 81st Anniversary Show that would take place the following Friday night in the same arena. In the main event Los Ingobernables (La Máscara and Rush) prepared for their CMLL World Tag Team Championship match by teaming with Diamante Azul to defeat champions Shocker and Negro Casas who teamed up with Mr. Niebla for the six-man tag team match. The previous week Thunder returned to CMLL after a seven-month absence and attacked Volador Jr. to signal his new rudo (bad guy) attitude. For the second week in a row Thunder came to the ring after the semi-main event and attacked Máscara Dorada, another one of his CMLL 81st Anniversary Show opponents.

=== September 12, 2014 Results ===
No.	Results	Stipulations
1	Mercurio and Pequeño Nitro defeated Shockercito and Stukita – two falls to one	Tag Team Best two-out-of-three falls match
2	Misterioso, Jr., Puma and Skándalo defeated Black Panther, Pegasso and Tritón – two falls to one	Six-man "Lucha Libre rules" tag team match
3	Barbaro Cavernario and Los Revolucionarios del Terror (Pólvora and Rey Escorpión) defeated Rey Cometa and Los Reyes de la Atlantida (Delta and Guerrero Maya, Jr.) – two falls to one	Six-man "Lucha Libre rules" tag team match
4	Fuego, Titán and Valiente defeated Ephesto, Hechicero and Niebla Roja – two falls to one	Six-man "Lucha Libre rules" tag team match
5	Marco Corleone, Máscara Dorada and Volador Jr. defeated Los Guerreros Laguneros (Eurforia, Gran Guerrero and Último Guerrero) – two falls to none	Six-man "Lucha Libre rules" tag team match
6	Diamante Azul and Los Ingobernables (La Máscara and Rush) defeated Shocker and La Peste Negra (Mr. Niebla and Negro Casas) – two falls to one	Six-man "Lucha Libre rules" tag team match

== September 19, 2014 ==
CMLL held a special show on September 19, 2014, replacing their regular Super Viernes show with the CMLL 81st Anniversary Show.

== September 26, 2014 ==
CMLL Super Viernes
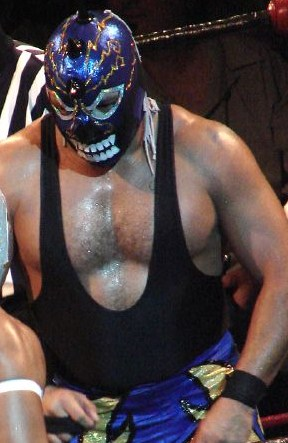
- Mephisto, qualified for the finals of the 2014 La Copa Junior VIP tournament
- Promotion: Consejo Mundial de Lucha Libre (CMLL)
- Date: September 26, 2014
- City: Mexico City, Mexico
- Venue: Arena México

Event chronology
← Previous; CMLL 81st Anniversary Show	Next → Super Viernes October 3, 2014

CMLL Super Viernes chronology
← Previous; Super Viernes September 12, 2014	Next → Super Viernes October 3, 2014

The September 26, 2014 Super Viernes professional wrestling event was the first Super Viernes held by Consejo Mundial de Lucha Libre (CMLL) after the CMLL 81st Anniversary Show the previous week. This marked the first time following his unmasking that Último Guerrero appeared in Arena México, fighting on the opposite side of the man that unmasked him, Atlantis. The newly unmasked Guerrero teamed up with the La Peste Negra ("The Black Plague") team of Mr. Niebla and Negro Casas to defeat Atlantis, Máscara Dorada and Valiente gaining a small measure of revenge for the loss a week prior. The show also hosted the first block of the La Copa Junior VIP, with the winner earning a spot it finals two weeks later. The eight competitors in Block A first faced off in a Battle Royal to determine the pairings for the actual tournament. The seeding battle royal was won by El Felino and La Máscara, which meant they would face off in the last of the four matches, while the first two faced off in the first match, the third and fourth man eliminated faced off in the second first round match and the fifth and sixth eliminated would wrestle in the third first round match of night. In the end Mephisto pinned Volador Jr. to move on to the finals of the tournament.

=== September 26, 2014 Results ===
No.	Results	Stipulations
1	Canelo Casas and Nitro defeated Esfinge and Oro, Jr. – two falls to one	Tag Team Best two-out-of-three falls match
2	Dragon Lee, Fuego and Tritón defeated Boby Zavala, Okumura and Virus – two falls to one	Six-man "Lucha Libre rules" tag team match
3	La Sombra, Marco Corleone and Stuka, Jr. defeated Rey Bucanero and Los Invasores (Kraneo and Mr. Águila) – two falls to one	Six-man "Lucha Libre rules" tag team match
4	El Felino and La Máscara defeated Guerrero Maya, Jr., Mephisto, Misterioso, Jr., Shocker, Tiger and Volador Jr.	Eight man La Copa Junior VIP Seeding Battle Royal
5	Mephisto defeated Guerrero Maya, Jr.	La Copa Junior VIP tournament First Round Match
6	Shocker defeated Misterioso, Jr.	La Copa Junior VIP tournament First Round Match
7	Volador Jr. defeated Tiger	La Copa Junior VIP tournament First Round Match
8	La Máscara defeated El Felino	La Copa Junior VIP tournament First Round Match
9	Mephisto defeated Shocker	La Copa Junior VIP tournament quarterfinal Match
10	Volador Jr. defeated La Máscara	La Copa Junior VIP tournament quarterfinal Match
11	Mephisto defeated Volador Jr.	La Copa Junior VIP tournament semi-final Match
12	Último Guerrero and La Peste Negra (Mr. Niebla and Negro Casas) defeated Atlantis, Máscara Dorada and Valiente – two falls to one	Six-man "Lucha Libre rules" tag team match

== September 2014 Super Viernes Competitors ==
Name	Shows	Dates
Artillero	1	September 5, 2014
Atlantis	2	September 5, 2014, September 26, 2014
Barbaro Cavernario	2	September 5, 2014, September 12, 2014
Black Panther	1	September 12, 2014
Brazo de Plata	1	September 5, 2014
Canelo Casas	2	September 5, 2014, September 26, 2014
Negro Casas	3	September 5, 2014, September 12, 2014, September 26, 2014
La Comandante	1	September 5, 2014
Marco Corleone	2	September 12, 2014, September 26, 2014
Dark Angel	1	September 5, 2014
Delta	1	September 12, 2014
Diamante Azul	1	September 12, 2014
Dragon Lee	1	September 26, 2014
Dragón Rojo, Jr.	1	September 5, 2014
Ephesto	1	September 12, 2014
Esfinge	1	September 26, 2014
Estrelita	1	September 5, 2014
Eurforia	1	September 12, 2014
El Felino	2	September 5, 2014, September 26, 2014
Fuego	3	September 5, 2014, September 12, 2014, September 26, 2014
Goya Kong	1	September 5, 2014
Gran Guerrero	2	September 5, 2014, September 12, 2014
Guerrero Maya, Jr.	2	September 12, 2014, September 26, 2014
Hechicero	1	September 12, 2014
Hombre Bala, Jr.	1	September 5, 2014
Kraneo	1	September 26, 2014
Máscara Dorada	2	September 12, 2014, September 26, 2014
La Máscara	3	September 5, 2014, September 12, 2014, September 26, 2014
Mephisto	1	September 26, 2014
Mercurio	1	September 12, 2014
Misterioso, Jr.	2	September 12, 2014, September 26, 2014
Mr. Niebla	3	September 5, 2014, September 12, 2014, September 26, 2014
Mr. Águila	1	September 26, 2014
Niebla Roja	1	September 12, 2014
Nitro	1	September 26, 2014
Okumura	1	September 26, 2014
Oro, Jr.	1	September 26, 2014
Pegasso	2	September 5, 2014, September 12, 2014
Pequeño Nitro	1	September 12, 2014
Pólvora	1	September 12, 2014
Puma	1	September 12, 2014
Rey Bucanero	2	September 5, 2014, September 26, 2014
Rey Cometa	2	September 5, 2014, September 12, 2014
Rey Escorpión	2	September 5, 2014, September 12, 2014
Rush	2	September 5, 2014, September 12, 2014
Shocker	2	September 12, 2014, September 26, 2014
Shockercito	1	September 12, 2014
Skándalo	1	September 12, 2014
La Sombra	2	September 5, 2014, September 26, 2014
Stuka, Jr.	2	September 5, 2014, September 26, 2014
Stukita	1	September 12, 2014
Super Comando	1	September 5, 2014
Super Halcón Jr.	1	September 5, 2014
El Terrible	1	September 5, 2014
Tiffany	1	September 5, 2014
Tiger	1	September 26, 2014
Titán	1	September 12, 2014
Tritón	2	September 12, 2014, September 26, 2014
Último Guerrero	3	September 5, 2014, September 12, 2014, September 26, 2014
Valiente	3	September 12, 2014, September 5, 2014, September 26, 2014
Virus	1	September 26, 2014
Volador Jr.	3	September 5, 2014, September 12, 2014, September 26, 2014
Boby Zavala	1	September 26, 2014
Zeuxis	1	September 5, 2014
