= CMLL Super Viernes (November 2014) =

In November 2014 the Mexican professional wrestling promotion Consejo Mundial de Lucha Libre (CMLL) will hold a total of five CMLL Super Viernes shows on Friday nights as they have not currently announced any special events to replace their regular Friday night shows. Some of the matches from Super Viernes are taped for CMLL's weekly shows that air on television in Mexico in the following week. The Super Viernes events features a varying number of professional wrestling matches, in which some wrestlers were involved in pre-existing scripted feuds or storylines and others were teamed up with no backstory reason as such. Wrestlers themselves portrayed either villains (referred to as "Rudos" in Mexico) or fan favorites ("Tecnicos" in Mexico) as they competed in matches with pre-determined outcomes.

== November 7, 2014 ==
CMLL Super Viernes
- Official poster for the first Super Viernes of November, 2014
- Promotion: Consejo Mundial de Lucha Libre
- Date: November 7, 2014
- City: Mexico City, Mexico
- Venue: Arena México

CMLL Super Viernes chronology
| ← Previous; Super Viernes October 31, 2014 | Next → Super Viernes November 14, 2014 |

Mexican Lucha libre, or professional wrestling, promotion Consejo Mundial de Lucha Libre (CMLL) held their Super Viernes show on November 7, 2014 at Arena México in Mexico City, Mexico. The Main Event of the six-match show was a six-man "Lucha Libre rules" tag team match with the trio of Los Ingobernables ("The Unruly"; La Máscara, La Sombra and Rush) faced the team of Thunder and Los Guerreros Lagunero ("The Warriors from the Lagoon"; Euforia and Último Guerrero), continuing a month-long storyline feud between the two sides. Valiente was originally scheduled to participate in the fifth match of the night but on the Tuesday before the show CMLL announced that Diamante Azul would take his place with no explanation for the substitution.

In the opening match third-generation wrestler Robin, son of Brazo de Plata and grandson of Shadito Cruz, teamed up with second-generation wrestler Star Jr., son of Star Boy to defeat the rudo (the bad guys) team of Akuma and Disturbio two falls to one to start off the show. In the second match of the night CMLL had originally announced that Cachorro would compete in a Six-man "Lucha Libre rules" tag team match, but on the night of the show he was replaced by Stigma without explanation. Stigma teamed up with Dragon Lee and Oro Jr. for a match against Nitro and La Fievre Amarilla ("The Yellow Wave"; Okumura and Kamaitachi). During the match Dragon Lee and Kamaitachi focused their attention on each other, continuing an emerging storyline feud between the two. In the end Kamaitachi pinned Dragon Lee to take the victory for his team. The fourth match of the night ended in a disqualification as Bárbaro Cavernario fouled Blue Panther about eight minutes into the match. Following the match Cavernario challenged Blue Panther to put his hair on the line in a Lucha de Apuestas, or "bet match". This challenge to a "hair vs. hair" match followed similar challenges on the previous week's Super Viernes between Blue Panther and Rey Bucanero as well as Máximo and El Felino as well as the steadily evolving storyline between the unmasked Rush and Último Guerrero. These challenges could potentially lead to a multi-man steel cage match later in the year where everyone would risk their hair on the outcome of the match. The hair challenges were repeated after the fifth match where Máximo, along with Diamante Azul and Volador Jr. defeated La Peste Negra ("The Black Plague"; Negro Casas, El Felino and Mr. Niebla). The main event marked the fifth week in a row that Los Ingobernables have faced off against Último Guerrero and various members of Los Guerreros Lagunero ("The Warriors from the Lagoon"). For this match Guerrero teamed up with Euforia and non-Lagunero wrestler Thunder to take on the Unruly trio of Rush, La Sombra and La Máscara. The Rudo trio of Guerrero, Euforia and Thunder cheated to win the third and deciding fall of the match to close the show.

=== November 7, 2014 Results ===
| No. | Results | Stipulations |
|---|---|---|
| 1 | Robin and Star Jr. defeated Akuma and Disturbio | Tag Team Best two-out-of-three falls match |
| 2 | Nitro and La Fievre Amarilla (Okumura and Kamaitachi) defeated Stigma, Dragon Lee and Oro Jr. | Six-man "Lucha Libre rules" tag team match |
| 3 | Dark Angel, La Vaquerita and Marcela defeated La Amapola, Dalys and La Comandante | Six-woman "Lucha Libre rules" tag team match |
| 4 | Blue Panther defeated Bárbaro Cavernario by disqualification | Lightning match (One fall, 10 minute time-limit match) |
| 5 | Diamante Azul, Máximo and Volador Jr. defeated La Peste Negra (Negro Casas, El Felino and Mr. Niebla) | Six-man "Lucha Libre rules" tag team match |
| 6 | Thunder and Los Guerreros Lagunero (Euforia and Último Guerrero) defeated Los Ingobernables (La Máscara, La Sombra and Rush) | Six-man "Lucha Libre rules" tag team match |

== November 14, 2014 ==
CMLL Super Viernes
- Official poster for the November 14 Super Viernes listing Rush and Vangelis as competing.
- Promotion: Consejo Mundial de Lucha Libre
- Date: November 14, 2014
- City: Mexico City, Mexico
- Venue: Arena México

CMLL Super Viernes chronology
| ← Previous; Super Viernes November 7, 2014 | Next → Super Viernes November 21, 2014 |

Mexican Lucha libre, or professional wrestling, promotion Consejo Mundial de Lucha Libre (CMLL) held their Super Viernes show on November 14, 2014 at Arena México in Mexico City, Mexico. The main event was scheduled to be a rematch from the previous week's Super Viernes as Los Ingobernables ("The Unruly"; La Máscara, La Sombra and Rush) going up against Thunder and Los Guerreros Lagunero (Euforia and Último Guerrero) after Thunder and Los Guerreros cheated to win the previous week. The day before the Super Viernes show Rush was injured during a match when he broke two bones in his leg and thus was unable to perform on the Super Viernes show. CMLL replaced him with Marco Corleone, someone who had teamed extensively with Rush in the past, even holding the CMLL World Trios Championship with La Máscara and Máximo. The makeshift duo came to the ring showing signs of unity with both La Máscara and La Sombra wearing ring gear in red, white and green, the color both of the Mexican and Italian flag for Marco Corleone. During the match Marco also displayed more of the Ingobernables aggressive style of wrestling instead of his normal tecnico ("good guy") style and attitude. In the third and deciding fall Los Ingobernables rushed in the ring when Corleone was about to pin Último Guerrero and attacked their partner. The confusion allowed Guerrero to land a low blow on Corleone to win the match. After the match Los Ingobernables left the ring, not caring that they lost while Marco Corleone took the microphone and challenged Último Guerrero to put his hair on the line in a match between the two.

The hair vs. hair or Lucha de Apuestas challenge after the main event was one of several that had been made over the previous three weeks and tied directly into the fourth match of the night, a 10-man torneo cibernetico elimination match. Vangelis was originally scheduled to appear but he was replaced by Hechicero on the night of the show with no explanation given. The rudo team (bad guys) consisted of Hechicero, Bárbaro Cavernario, El Felino, Rey Bucanero and El Terrible going against the tecnico team of Atlantis, Blue Panther, Máscara Dorada, Máximo and Volador Jr. The match includes several wrestlers who have challenged people to put their hair on the line in Lucha de Apuestas, or "bet matches" on previous Super Viernes shows. Of the group only Atlantis, Hechicero and Máscara Dorada are masked, allowing CMLL to build more tension between the seven unmasked wrestlers as they possibly prepare for a multi-man Luchas de Apuestas match at a later date. Hechicero, the replacement was the first man eliminated from the match as Máscara Dorada pinned him. Following the first elimination Atlantis and Máscara Dorada were eliminated, leaving the seven unmasked wrestlers in the match to fight it out. The order of elimination from that point on was Blue Panther, eliminated by Bárbaro Cavernario; Bárbaro Cavernario by Máximo; Felino by Máximo; Máximo by Rey Bucanero; El Terrible by Volador Jr.; Máximo by Rey Bucanero and El Terrible by Volador Jr. The match came down to Volador Jr. and Rey Bucanero, with El Terrible helping Bucanero win the match. Following the match the unmasked competitors fought in and out of the ring and finally repeated hair vs. hair challenges that had been made previously. The day after the show CMLL posted a video announcing the December 5th Infierno en el Ring show, which will feature a multi-man steel cage match where the loser would be shaved bald as a result. The video did not name specific competitors but did include footage of Negro Casas, El Felino, Máximo, Bárbaro Cavernario, Blue Panther, Último Guerrero, Rush and Volador Jr. hinting at possible competitors in the main event.

The November 14th Super Viernes show was the first time Ángel de Oro appeared on the show after he won the CMLL World Light Heavyweight Championship a few months earlier. Ángel de Oro teamed up with Mexican National Welterweight Champion Titán and Valiente taking on Mexican National Light Heavyweight Champion Mephisto teaming up with his regular partner Ephesto as well as Japanese wrestler Kamaitachi for a Six-man "Lucha Libre rules" tag team match. During the match Mephisto tried on multiple occasions to pin Ángel de Oro while using the ropes for an illegal advantage, but in the end Ángel de Oro gave Mephisto a taste of his own medicine, pinning him while HE himself held onto the ropes for leverage. After the show CMLL indicated that the interaction between Ángel de Oro and Mephisto was more than an isolated incident as they announced the two facing off in a Lightning Match on the following week's Super Viernes show. Following the third match Chavo Guerrero Jr. and Hernandez, two non-CMLL wrestlers came to the ring to promote a show called "All Elite" that featured a number of CMLL wrestlers working with wrestlers on the Mexican independent circuit. The opening match marked only the second time luchador Esfinge appeared on a Super Viernes show, having first appeared on the September 26 Super Viernes. In his second appearance he teamed up with Stigma and gained his first victory as the duo defeated Disturbio and Nitro in the first match of the night.

=== November 14, 2014 Results ===
| No. | Results | Stipulations |
|---|---|---|
| 1 | Esfinge and Stigma defeated Disturbio and Nitro | Tag Team Best two-out-of-three falls match |
| 2 | Astral, Fantasy and Último Dragoncito defeated Pequeño Nitro, Pequeño Olímpico and Pierrothito | Six-man "Lucha Libre rules" tag team match |
| 3 | Ángel de Oro, Titán and Valiente defeated Ephesto, Kamaitachi and Mephisto | Six-man "Lucha Libre rules" tag team match |
| 4 | Rey Bucanero defeated Atlantis, Bárbaro Cavernario, Blue Panther, Hechicero, El Felino, Máscara Dorada, Máximo, El Terrible and Volador Jr. | 10-man torneo cibernetico elimination match |
| 5 | Thunder and Los Guerreros Lagunero (Euforia and Último Guerrero) defeated Marco Corleone and Los Ingobernables (La Máscara and La Sombra) | Six-man "Lucha Libre rules" tag team match |

== November 21, 2014 ==
CMLL Super Viernes
- Official poster for the November 21 Super Viernes
- Promotion: Consejo Mundial de Lucha Libre
- Date: November 21, 2014
- City: Mexico City, Mexico
- Venue: Arena México

CMLL Super Viernes chronology
| ← Previous; Super Viernes November 14, 2014 | Next → Super Viernes November 28, 2014 |

Mexican Lucha libre, or professional wrestling, promotion Consejo Mundial de Lucha Libre (CMLL) will hold their next Super Viernes show on November 21, 2014 at Arena México in Mexico City, Mexico. Three of the scheduled six matches will include two or more competitors currently involved in various storylines where they have been making repeated challenges for their opponents to bet their hair in a Lucha de Apuestas all leading up to a multi-man steel cage match slated to be the main event of CMLL's 2014 Infierno en el Ring show on December 5. No names were confirmed for the show before the November 21st Super Viernes show. In the main event two rumored Infierno en el Ring competitors are on opposite sides of a Six-man "Lucha Libre rules" tag team match; Último Guerrero and Volador Jr. Guerrero will team up with Thunder and Euforia as he had for several weeks while Volador Jr. will team up with Guerrero's long time rival Atlantis as well as Valiente. Volador Jr. and Guerrero will be the only unmasked wrestlers in the match and the only two likely to compete in the Infierno en el Ring match out of that group. The previous week Marco Corleone challenged Guerrero to a hair match, but Corleone is not scheduled to appear on the show. All unmasked competitors scheduled for the third and fourth match have in some way been making "hair vs. hair" challenges in the preceding weeks, making it possible that Blue Panther, Rey Bucanero, Bárbaro Cavernario, El Felino, Máximo, Shocker, El Terrible and Vangelis could all end up in the cage match. In the fourth match of the night CMLL World Light Heavyweight Champion Ángel de Oro is set to face off against Mexican National Light Heavyweight Champion Mephisto, continuing on the storyline that was started the previous week, potentially leading to a featured match between the two at Infierno en el Ring.

=== November 21, 2014 Results ===
| No. | Results | Stipulations |
|---|---|---|
| 1 | Blue Panther Jr. and Tritón defeated Arkangel de la Muerte and El Hijo del Signo | Tag Team Best two-out-of-three falls match |
| 2 | Dragon Lee, Pegasso and Rey Cometa defeated Virus and La Fievre Amarilla (Okumura and Kamaitachi) | Six-man "Lucha Libre rules" tag team match |
| 3 | Blue Panther and Los Reyes de la Atlantida (Delta and Guerrero Maya Jr.) defeated Rey Bucanero and La Peste Negra (Bárbaro Cavernario and El Felino) | Six-man "Lucha Libre rules" tag team match |
| 4 | Ángel de Oro defeated Mephisto | Lightning match (One fall, 10 minute time-limit match) |
| 5 | Shocker and TRT: La Máquina de la Destrucción (El Terrible and Vangelis) defeated Máscara Dorada, Máximo and Titán | Six-man "Lucha Libre rules" tag team match |
| 6 | Atlantis, Valiente and Volador Jr. defeated Thunder and Los Guerreros Lagunero (Euforia and Último Guerrero) by disqualification | Six-man "Lucha Libre rules" tag team match |

== November 28, 2014 ==
CMLL Super Viernes
- Official poster of the event.
- Promotion: Consejo Mundial de Lucha Libre
- Date: November 28, 2014
- City: Mexico City, Mexico
- Venue: Arena México

Event chronology
| ← Previous; Super Viernes November 14, 2014 | Next → Infierno en el Ring (2014) |

CMLL Super Viernes chronology
| ← Previous; Super Viernes November 14, 2014 | Next → Super Viernes December 12, 2014 |

The November 28, 2014 Super Viernes lucha libre (professional wrestling) show will be the 45th Super Viernes of 2014 and the last show before CMLL holds its annual major show called Infierno en el Ring.

=== Results ===
| No. | Results | Stipulations |
|---|---|---|
| 1 | Disturbio and Metálico defeated Oro Jr. and Starman | Tag Team Best two-out-of-three falls match |
| 2 | La Comandante, Dalys la Caribeña and Tiffany defeated Estrellita, Goya Kong and Princesa Sujei | Six-man "Lucha Libre rules" tag team match |
| 3 | Negro Casas, Euforia and Niebla Roja defeated Dragón Rojo Jr., Máscara Dorada and Rey Cometa | Six-man "Lucha Libre rules" tag team match |
| 4 | El Felino defeated Rey Bucanero by disqualification | Lightning match VIP (One fall, 10 minute time-limit match) |
| 5 | Bárbaro Cavernario, Shocker and Vangelis defeated Blue Panther and La Avalanca Alvarado (Brazo de Plata and Máximo) | Six-man "Lucha Libre rules" tag team match |
| 6 | El Terrible, Thunder and Último Guerrero defeated Atlantis, La Máscara and Volador Jr. | Six-man "Lucha Libre rules" tag team match |
