= CMLL Super Viernes (October 2014) =

Mexican wrestling shows in October 2014

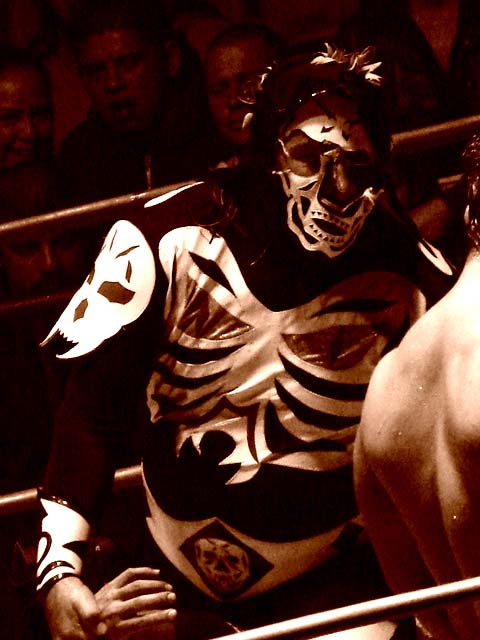
L.A. Park, who returned to CMLL after an eight-year absence.

In October 2014 the Mexican professional wrestling promotion Consejo Mundial de Lucha Libre (CMLL) held a total of five CMLL Super Viernes shows on Friday nights as there were no special events to replace their regular Friday night shows. Some of the matches from Super Viernes were taped for CMLL's weekly shows that air on television in Mexico in the following week. The first and second Super Viernes show in October featured the first and final rounds of the La Copa Junior VIP tournament, the second such tournament of 2014, which featured higher ranking wrestlers than the January 1, 2014 version. In the end Máximo defeated Mephisto to win the tournament. The October 31st Super Viernes saw the return of L.A. Park, who had not worked for CMLL since 2008, along with his son El Hijo de L.A. Park.

The Super Viernes events features a varying number of professional wrestling matches, in which some wrestlers were involved in pre-existing scripted feuds or storylines and others were teamed up with no backstory reason as such. Wrestlers themselves portrayed either villains (referred to as "Rudos" in Mexico) or fan favorites ("Tecnicos" in Mexico) as they competed in matches with pre-determined outcomes. As of October 24, 2014 77 wrestlers have or are scheduled to appear on one or several Super Viernes shows in October, working a total of 36 matches, three women's matches and two Mini-Estrellas. In all twelve women five, Mini-Estrellas and 60 male wrestlers competed. La Máscara, Máximo, Rush, La Sombra and Último Guerrero will have wrestled on all five shows in October if they make their scheduled appearance on October 31. Makoto and Narumiya were the only wrestlers to make their Super Viernes debut in October as they began their tour with CMLL.

== October 3, 2014 ==
CMLL Super Viernes
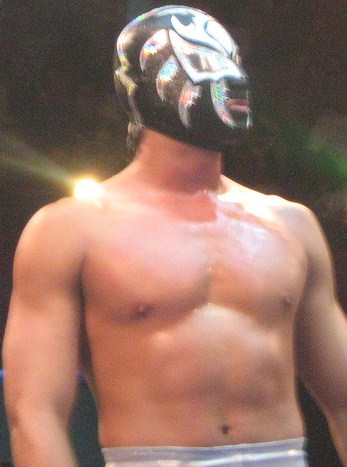
- La Sombra, caused his own elimination from the La Copa Junior VIP tournament
- Promotion: Consejo Mundial de Lucha Libre
- Date: October 3, 2014
- City: Mexico City, Mexico
- Venue: Arena México

CMLL Super Viernes chronology
← Previous; Super Viernes September 26, 2014	Next → Super Viernes October 10, 2014

Mexican professional wrestling promotion Consejo Mundial de Lucha Libre's (CMLL) October 3, 2014 Super Viernes show featured a total of twelve matches, eight of which were all related to the 2014 La Copa Junior VIP tournament. The La Copa Junior tournament is a recurring CMLL tournament featuring second or third-generation wrestlers competing against each other. Brazo de Plata (son of Shadito Cruz) was originally slated to appear, but was replaced by Ángel de Oro (son of wrestler Apolo Chávez) without an official explanation of why. The previous week Mephisto had won the first qualifying round, which the October 3 Super Viernes focusing on the second qualifying block. Block B saw the participation of Delta (son of Trueno), Euforia (Son of El Soberano), Máximo (Son of Brazo de Oro), Puma (Son of El Felino), La Sombra (son of Brilliante), Stuka, Jr. (Brother of Stuka) and Rush (son of Toro Blanco).

CMLL first held an eight man Battle Royal to determine the match order for the tournament, using the elimination order to determine the match order. In order of elimination Stuka, Jr. and Delta faced off in the first match of the first round, Puma faced Máximo in the second match and La Sombra and Ángel de Oro faced off in the third match. By virtue of being the last two men in the ring Euforia and Rush was given the longest rest as they faced off in the fourth and final match of the first round of the actual tournament. In the first round Stuka, Jr., Máximo, La Sombra and Rush all advanced. In the second round Máximo defeated Stuka, Jr. to earn his spot in the semi-finals. The other match saw Los Ingobernables ("The Unruly") team members La Sombra and Rush on opposite sides. During the week Rush had claimed that he would gladly fight against La Sombra if it came to it, but instead Rush simply laid down to allow La Sombra to pin him without actually fighting each other. In the finals La Sombra lost the match and eliminated himself from the tournament when he landed a foul, low blow, on Máximo to cause himself to be disqualified. The main event of the evening centered around the developing storyline of Australia wrestler Thunder's recent rudo turn as he teamed up with Mephisto and Último Guerrero. Their opposition consisted of Volador Jr., the person Thunder had turned on, Diamante Azul and the third Ingobernables member La Máscara. As part of the storyline behind the Los Ingobernables team was that they did not get along with anyone outside that trio and often acted more like rudos while wrestling. The Ingobernables storyline became the main reason Diamante Azul, Volador Jr. and La Máscara lost the match as Volador Jr. and La Máscara could not get along. Allowing the united rudos team to win the match, two falls to one.

=== October 3, 2014 Results ===
No.	Results	Stipulations
1	Demus 3:16 and Pierroth defeated Astral and Stukita	Tag Team Best two-out-of-three falls match
2	Cachorro, Dragon Lee and Fuego defeated Los Cancerberos del Infierno (Cancerbero, Raziel and Virus)	Six-man "Lucha Libre rules" tag team match
3	Marcela and El Sexy Team (Dark Angel and Goya Kong) defeated La Amapola, Dalys la Caribeña and Zeuxis	Six-man "Lucha Libre rules" tag team match
4	Euforia and Rush defeated Ángel de Oro, Delta, Máximo, Puma, La Sombra and Stuka, Jr.	Eight man La Copa Junior VIP Seeding Battle Royal
5	Stuka, Jr. defeated Delta	La Copa Junior VIP tournament First Round Match
6	Máximo defeated Puma	La Copa Junior VIP tournament First Round Match
7	La Sombra defeated Ángel de Oro	La Copa Junior VIP tournament First Round Match
8	Rush defeated Euforia	La Copa Junior VIP tournament First Round Match
9	Máximo defeated Stuka, Jr.	La Copa Junior VIP tournament First Round Match
10	La Sombra defeated Rush	La Copa Junior VIP tournament First Round Match
11	Máximo defeated La Sombra by disqualification	La Copa Junior VIP tournament First Round Match
12	Mephisto, Thunder and Último Guerrero defeated Diamante Azul, La Máscara and Volador Jr.	Six-man "Lucha Libre rules" tag team match

== October 10, 2014 ==
CMLL Super Viernes
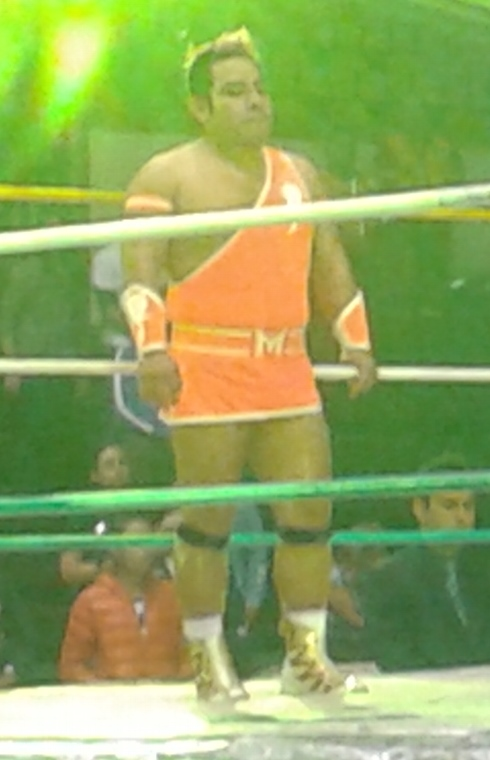
- Máximo winner of the 2014 lLa Copa Junior VIP tournament
- Promotion: Consejo Mundial de Lucha Libre
- Date: October 10, 2014
- City: Mexico City, Mexico
- Venue: Arena México

CMLL Super Viernes chronology
← Previous; Super Viernes October 3, 2014	Next → Super Viernes October 17, 2014

One of the featured matches of the Mexican wrestling promotion Consejo Mundial de Lucha Libre's (CMLL) October 10 Super Viernes show was the finals of the 2014 lLa Copa Junior VIP tournament between Mephisto and Máximo. Mephisto had qualified for the finals by winning the first qualifying block on September 26, 2014 and Máximo won the second qualifying round on October 3, 2014. Mephisto brought his father, known under the ring name Astro Rey to the ring with him while Máximo has his father Brazo de Plata, an active CMLL wrestler, in his corner. The match was the only tournament match contested under Best two-out-of-three falls rules. After splitting the first two falls between them Máximo won the third and deciding fall to win his first ever La Copa Junior tournament.

The undercard also saw the continuation of a storyline rivalry between Diamante Azul and Shocker that had been initiated a few weeks prior. In the fourth match of the night Diamante Azul teamed up with Marco Corleone and Valiente to face Kraneo, Mr. Niebla and Shocker. Throughout the match a lot of the focus was the segments where Diamante Azul and Shocker were in the ring together, trying to build interest in a future one-on-one match between the two. In the end Diamante Azul's team won two falls to one. The main event of the night saw the beginning of a storyline between two fractions as Los Ingobernables (La Máscara, La Sombra and Rush) took on and defeated Los Guerreros Lagunero (Euforia and Último Guerrero) who teamed up with Thunder for the show. Los Ingoberanables targeted Guerrero especially, possibly in a bid to faces Los Guerreros Lagunero for the CMLL World Trios Championship at some point in the future. The storyline direction was further emphasized when Los Ingobernables were booked against Los Guerreros (this time Gran Guerrero, Niebla Roja and Último Guerrero) in the main event of the follow week's Super Viernes show.

=== October 10, 2014 Results ===
No.	Results	Stipulations
1	Akuma and Disturbio defeated Robin and Soberano Jr.	Tag Team Best two-out-of-three falls match
2	Misterioso, Jr., Skándalo and Virus defeated Black Panther, Pegasso and Tritón	Six-man "Lucha Libre rules" tag team match
3	Ángel de Oro, Delta and Rey Cometa defeated Ephesto, El Felino and Hechicero	Six-man "Lucha Libre rules" tag team match
4	Diamante Azul, Marco Corleone and Valiente defeated Kraneo, Mr. Niebla and Shocker	Six-man "Lucha Libre rules" tag team match
5	Máximo defeated Mephisto	La Copa Junior VIP tournament finals
6	Los Ingobernables (La Máscara, La Sombra and Rush) defeated Thunder and Los Guerreros Lagunero (Euforia and Último Guerrero)	Six-man "Lucha Libre rules" tag team match

== October 17, 2014 ==
CMLL Super Viernes
- Promotion: Consejo Mundial de Lucha Libre
- Date: October 17, 2014
- City: Mexico City, Mexico
- Venue: Arena México

CMLL Super Viernes chronology
← Previous; Super Viernes October 10, 2014	Next → Super Viernes October 24, 2014

The October 17, 2014 Super Viernes was the third Super Vierne ("Super Friday") professional wrestling show produced by the Mexican wrestling promotion Consejo Mundial de Lucha Libre (CMLL) in October, 2014. The Super Viernes show is CMLL's main weekly show and is often the focal point of their scripted feuds or storyline development. With no announced major CMLL show at the time the episode of Super Viernes moved a number of storylines along towards their planned crescendo. The main even of the six-match show was a Six-man "Lucha Libre rules" tag team match between the team of Los Ingobernables ("The Unruly"; La Máscara, La Sombra and Rush) and Los Guerreros Lagunero ("The Warriors from the Lagoon"; Gran Guerrero, Niebla Roja and Último Guerrero). The storyline behind the match was a combination of an individual rivalry between Rush and Último Guerrero that was in the developing stages of a potential longer term storyline. The other storyline pitted Los Ingobernables against Los Guerreros as a whole, potentially leading to a match between the two factions for Los GUerreros Lagunero's CMLL World Trios Championship at a later Super Viernes show. Los Guerreros won the first fall of the match, taking the lead as the two teams faced off for the second fall. During the closing moments of the second fall Último Guerrero pretended that Rush had kicked him in the groin, playing it up to the extent that the referee believed him and unjustly awarded the match to Los Guerreros Laguneros. Following the match both Rush and Último Guerrero took the microphone and made various challenges for singles matches between the two, although at the time nothing was finalized.

The fifth match of the night, the semi-main event, was meant to feature the ongoing feud between Diamante Azul and Shocker, but at the night of the show Stuka, Jr. took his place in the match, teaming up with Máscara Dorada and Máximo. Joining Shocker was Euforia and Thunder. Thunder, a large muscular wrestler from Australia,, had returned to CMLL less than two months prior and turned rudo ("Bad guy") by attacking a couple of the high flying tecnicos ("Good guys") Volador Jr. and Máscara Dorada. On October 17 the focal point of the match quickly became Thunder tossing the smaller, lighter opponents around the ring, especially Máscara Dorada whom he pinned to win the match after a power bomb in the third and deciding fall. The third match of the night was CMLL's weekly "Lighting Match" a one fall (as opposed to all other matches on the show that were "best-two-out-of-three falls") with a 10 minute time limit. For the Lighting match CMLL rookie Dragon Lee took on and defeated the Japanese wrestler known as Kamaitachi. The second match of the night was the Super Viernes debut of Japanese female wrestlers Makoto and Narumiya who were touring with CMLL. The duo was joined by Puerto Rican wrestler Zeuxis as they took on Dark Angel, Lluvia and Marcela. In the end Makoto pinned her opponent for the third and deciding fall.

=== October 17, 2014 Results ===
No.	Results	Stipulations
1	Astral and Eléctrico defeated Demus 3:16 and Pierrothito	Tag Team Best two-out-of-three falls match
2	Makoto, Narumiya and Zeuxis defeated Dark Angel, Lluvia and Marcela	Six-woman "Lucha Libre rules" tag team match
3	Dragon Lee defeated Kamaitachi	Lightning match (One fall, 10 minute time-limit match)
4	Mr. Niebla and La Fuerza TRT (El Terrible and Vangelis) defeated Blue Panther, Fuego and Titán	Six-man "Lucha Libre rules" tag team match
5	Euforia, Shocker and Thunder defeated Máscara Dorada, Máximo and Stuka, Jr.	Six-man "Lucha Libre rules" tag team match
6	Los Guerreros Lagunero (Gran Guerrero, Niebla Roja and Último Guerrero) defeated Los Ingobernables (La Máscara, La Sombra and Rush)	Six-man "Lucha Libre rules" tag team match

== October 24, 2014 ==
CMLL Super Viernes
- Official poster for the October 24th Super Viernes
- Promotion: Consejo Mundial de Lucha Libre
- Date: October 24, 2014
- City: Mexico City, Mexico
- Venue: Arena México

CMLL Super Viernes chronology
← Previous; Super Viernes October 17, 2014	Next → Super Viernes October 31, 2014

The October 24, 2014 Super Viernes show was the fourth October Super Viernes show produced by Mexican wrestling promotion Consejo Mundial de Lucha Libre (CMLL). The show included six matches in total with a main event rematch from the previous week's show as Los Ingobernables (La Máscara, La Sombra and Rush) took on Los Guerreros Lagunero (Gran Guerrero, Niebla Roja and Último Guerrero) once again. In addition to that the show featured one tag team match, a Lightning match (One fall, 10 minute time-limit match) and four Six-man "Lucha Libre rules" tag team match. Being a professional wrestling the wrestlers engage in mock-combat to provide a scripted outcome to specific matches through plans that are not made public before the show.

The main event was the third week in a row that Los Ingobernables had faced some combination of wrestlers form Los Guerreros Lagunero and the second week in a row that La Máscara, La Sombra and Rush faced Gran Guerrero, Niebla Roja and Último Guerrero specifically as part of a longer-running storyline between the two factions. Los Ingobernables came to the ring wearing creepy masks, hoodies and pants instead of their normal wrestling gear, giving the impression of more of a street gang than a wrestling team. The majority of the in-ring action centered around Último Guerrero and Rush as they focused primarily on each other throughout the match, building to the already announced singles match between the two the following week. In the third and deciding fall La Máscara and La Sombra held Último Guerrero still, allowing Rush to run across the ring and land a foul kick on Último Guerrero in front of the referee. This led to the disqualification loss for Los Ingobernables, but the trio showed once again that they cared less about winning the match and more about inflicting pain on their opponents. Over the years Volador Jr. has made it a habit to sometimes wear ring gear that resembles various super heroes, a tradition he continued in the semi-main event as he came to the ring looking like Spider-Man as he appeared on the Future Foundation storyline. Volador Jr. teamed up with Titán and Valiente, only to lose to the trio known as La Fuerza TRT ("The TRT Power"; El Terrible, Rey Bucanero and Vangelis) who win the first and the last fall to win the whole match. The fourth match of the evening was a match type called a Match Relampago ("Lighting Match"), a one fall match with a 10 minute time limit. The Lighting Match saw former rivals Máximo and Rey Escorpión face off, playing off a longer-running storyline between the two. On August 18, 2013 Rey Escorpión defeated Máximo's father Brazo de Plata in a Lucha de Apuestas, or bet match, after which Brazo de Plata was shaved bald as a result. Brazo de Plata lost when Máximo tried to interfere and it cost his father the match. In subsequent months the feud moved on to Máximo trying to get revenge for his father against Rey Escorpión. The storyline included a match for Rey Escorpión's CMLL World Light Heavyweight Championship, won by against Máximo. In the months following the title match the focus seemed to shift away from their rivalry, but on October 25 it was rekindled as the two fought a very intense match, won by Máximo, followed by him making challenges for Rey Escorpión's championship once more. Like Volador Jr., the rudo ("the Bad guy") Mephisto had on several occasions patterned his ring gear on characters from comic books, in his case particularly super villains. For the October 25 show Mephisto wrestled in an outfit and mask that resembled a Zombie Batman character. Mephisto teamed up with regular partner Ephesto and a man who was starting to team with the two more and more, Hechicero as the team took on rookie Dragon Lee and two-thirds of Los Reyes de la Atlantida ("The kings of the Atlantis"; Delta and Guerrero Maya, Jr.). The teams split the first two falls between them in quick fashion, while the third fall was the longest of the match, longer than the first two falls combined, and saw Hechicero and Guerrero Maya, Jr. square off on several occasions, possibly sowing the seeds for a future storyline.

=== October 24, 2014 Results ===
No.	Results	Stipulations
1	Disturbio and Guerrero Negro, Jr. defeated El Soberano and Oro, Jr.	Tag Team Best two-out-of-three falls match
2	Estrellita, Lluvia and Princesa Sujei defeated La Comandante, Makoto and Narumiya	Six-man "Lucha Libre rules" tag team match
3	Ephesto, Hechicero and Mephisto defeated Dragon Lee and Los Reyes de la Atlantida (Delta and Guerrero Maya, Jr.)	Six-man "Lucha Libre rules" tag team match
4	Máximo defeated Rey Escorpión	Lightning match VIP (One fall, 10 minute time-limit match)
5	La Fuerza TRT (El Terrible, Rey Bucanero and Vangelis) defeated Titán, Valiente and Volador Jr.	Six-man "Lucha Libre rules" tag team match
6	Los Guerreros Lagunero (Gran Guerrero, Niebla Roja and Último Guerrero) defeated Los Ingobernables (La Máscara, La Sombra and Rush) by disqualification	Six-man "Lucha Libre rules" tag team match

== October 31, 2014 ==
CMLL Super Viernes
- Official poster for CMLL's Day of the Dead celebration
- Promotion: Consejo Mundial de Lucha Libre
- Date: October 31, 2014
- City: Mexico City, Mexico
- Venue: Arena México

CMLL Super Viernes chronology
← Previous; Super Viernes October 24, 2014	Next → Super Viernes November 7, 2014

The October 31, 2014 Super Viernes show was the first of Mexican professional wrestling promotion Consejo Mundial de Lucha Libre's Dia de los Muertos ("Day of the Dead") celebrations and included six matches in total. As part of their Dia de los Muerte celebrations CMLL will admit all kids in costumes for free for this specific show. CMLL will hold a second Dia de los Muerte celebration on Sunday November 2, both will include the Edcanes, CMLL's ring girls and various wrestlers dressed up, as well as turning the basement of Arena México into a haunted house attraction before each show. The main event was a best two-out-of-three falls match between Rush and Último Guerrero. CMLL rarely books singles matches for their main events unless they are for a championship or a Lucha de Apuestas match ("Bet match"), pushing the rivalry between Rush's group Los Ingobernables and Guerrero's group Los Guerreros Lagunero that had been building for several weeks further into the spotlight and beyond being merely about the CMLL World Trios Championship that Los Guerreros Lagunero held, instead making it a personal rivalry between Rush and Último Guerrero. In the fourth match of the night the remaining Ingobernables (La Máscara and La Sombra) and Guerreros Lagunero (Euforia and Gran Guerrero) were on opposite sides of a six-man "Lucha Libre rules" tag team match; Los Ingobernables will team up with Stuka, Jr. while Los Guerreros Lagunero will team up with Pólvora.

At the opening of the show CMLL's Edcanes (Ring girls) were introduced, with half of them in face and body paint resembling the Calavera figure that is associated with the Dia de los Muertos celebration and half of them dressed and painted to resemble demons of the underground. Throughout the show the demonic Edcanes and select Rudo wrestlers all acted on instructions from someone dressed as King Mictlantecuhtli, the Aztec lord of the underground, and would carry off the losing wrestlers to the "underworld", or in this case one of the side exits at Arena México. Throughout the nights the various masked Rudo wrestlers wore masks that where half their normal mask and half a demonic, evil mask while the unmasked wrestlers had their face and body painted to resemble skeletons. In the opening match the team of Los Hombres del Camoflaje ("Men in Camouflage"; Artillero and Súper Comando) defeated Hombre Bala Jr. and Súper Halcón, Jr. two falls to one, after which the losing side were the first wrestlers "condemned to the underground" by King Mictlantecuhtli.

After the fifth match of the night Diamante Azul and Thunder kept fighting until they were interrupted by the surprise appearance of L.A. Park and his son El Hijo de L.A. Park. Park made his return to CMLL after last working for them in 2008 and immediately challenged anyone in CMLL to a fight. After no one stepped forward L.A. Park and his son returned to the back. Before the main event King Mictlantecuhtli was unmasked to reveal that Último Guerrero had been commanding the underworld arm throughout the night, Guerrero would reprise the role two days later on CMLL's Sunday night show. In previous weeks Guerrero had been on the receiving end of a low blow from Rush, but on the night Guerrero demonstrated why for a long time he has been considered the top rudo wrestler in CMLL as he won the third and deciding fall of a hard-fought match by landing a low blow on Rush. Unlike Rush though Guerrero made sure the referee did not witness the rule breaking and instead pinned his opponent to win the match. Following the match Rush made angry challenges at Último Guerrero, including a challenge to defend the CMLL World Trios Championship against his team at an undetermined date in the future.

On November 6, it was announced that L.A. Park was not joining CMLL, but was only at the event to promote a partnership between CMLL and the new independent "Liga Elite" promotion.

=== October 31, 2014 Results ===
No.	Results	Stipulations
1	Los Hombres del Camoflaje (Artillero and Súper Comando) defeated Hombre Bala Jr. and Súper Halcón, Jr.	Tag Team Best two-out-of-three falls match
2	Boby Zavala and Los Cancerberos del Infierno (Raziel and Virus) defeated Dragon Lee, Pegasso and Tritón	Six-man "Lucha Libre rules" tag team match
3	Máximo, Rey Cometa and Titán defeated Hechicero and La Peste Negra (Barbaro Cavernario and El Felino)	Six-man "Lucha Libre rules" tag team match
4	Pólvora and Los Guerreros Lagunero (Euforia and Gran Guerrero) defeated Stuka, Jr. and Los Ingobernables (La Máscara and La Sombra) by disqualification	Six-man "Lucha Libre rules" tag team match
5	Thunder and La Peste Negra (Mr. Niebla and Negro Casas) defeated Atlantis, Diamante Azul and Volador Jr.	Six-man "Lucha Libre rules" tag team match
6	Último Guerrero defeated Rush	Best two-out-of-three falls match
