= CMLL Super Viernes (December 2014) =

In December 2014 the Mexican professional wrestling promotion Consejo Mundial de Lucha Libre (CMLL) held a total of three CMLL Super Viernes shows on Friday nights as the Friday December 5th slot was replaced with CMLL's major annual show Infierno en el Ring. Several of the Infierno en el Ring matches were as a direct result of matches on the previous months' Super Viernes shows. Some of the matches from Super Viernes were taped for CMLL's weekly shows that aired on television in Mexico in the following week. The Super Viernes events featured a varying number of professional wrestling matches, in which some wrestlers were involved in pre-existing scripted feuds or storylines and others were teamed up with no storyline reason as such. Wrestlers themselves portrayed either villains (referred to as "Rudos" in Mexico) or fan favorites ("Tecnicos" in Mexico) as they competed in matches with predetermined outcomes that is not known to the general public ahead of time.

== December 5, 2014 ==
On December 5, 2014 CMLL held the 2014 version of the Infierno en el Ring show, replacing the regular Super Viernes show on Friday night.

== December 12, 2014 ==
CMLL Super Viernes
- Promotion: Consejo Mundial de Lucha Libre
- Date: December 12, 2014
- City: Mexico City, Mexico
- Venue: Arena México

Event chronology
← Previous; Infierno en el Ring (2014)	Next → Super Viernes December 17, 2014

CMLL Super Viernes chronology
← Previous; Super Viernes November 28, 2014	Next → Super Viernes December 19, 2014

Mexican professional wrestling, or Lucha libre, promotion Consejo Mundial de Lucha Libre (CMLL) held their 46th CMLL Super Viernes show of 2014 on December 26, 2014 in Arena México, Mexico City, Mexico. The show was the first Super Viernes show following their 2014 Infierno en el Ring show, with some matches being a follow-up to storylines from that show. The main event was another chapter in the feud between the team known as Los Ingobernables (La Máscara and La Sombra) and Shocker and Último Guerrero, a storyline originally centering on Rush and Último Guerrero, but once Rush was injured the storyline became less focused on an individual feud. Los Ingobernables were joined by (at the time) unofficial Ingobernables member Marco Corleone, who was involved in a developing storyline with Thunder who teamed up with Shocker and Último Guerrero for the show. In the fifth match of the night Rey Bucanero, fresh off his win at the Infierno en el Ring main event continued his feud with Volador Jr.

=== December 12, 2014 Results ===
No.	Results	Stipulations	Times
1	Acero and Último Dragoncito defeated Pequeño Olímpico and Pequeño Universo 2000	Best two-out-of-three falls tag team match	—
2	Nitro and Los Cancerberos del Infierno (Cancerbero and Raziel) defeated Hombre Bala Jr., Super Halcón Jr. and Tritón	Six-man "Lucha Libre rules" tag team match	—
3	Pólvora and Los Hijos del Averno (Ephesto and Mephisto) defeated Brazo de Plata, Dragón Rojo Jr. and Titán	Six-man "Lucha Libre rules" tag team match	—
4	Valiente defeated Bárbaro Cavernario by disqualification	Lighting Match (One fall, 10-minute time limit)	09:16
5	Negro Casas and TRT: La Máquina de la Destrucción (Rey Bucanero and El Terrible) defeated Atlantis, Máximo and Volador Jr.	Six-man "Lucha Libre rules" tag team match	—
6	Marco Corleone and Los Ingobernables (La Máscara and La Sombra) defeated Shocker, Thunder and Último Guerrero	Six-man "Lucha Libre rules" tag team match	—

== December 19, 2014 ==
CMLL Super Viernes
- Promotion: Consejo Mundial de Lucha Libre
- Date: December 19, 2014
- City: Mexico City, Mexico
- Venue: Arena México

CMLL Super Viernes chronology
← Previous; Super Viernes December 12, 2014	Next → Super Viernes December 26, 2014

Mexican professional wrestling, or Lucha libre, promotion Consejo Mundial de Lucha Libre (CMLL) held their 47th CMLL Super Viernes show of 2014 on December 29, 2014 in Arena México, Mexico City, Mexico. The main event match was the continuation of a storyline that pre-dated the 2014 Infierno en el Ring show as TRT: La Máquina de la Destrucción (Rey Bucanero and El Terrible) continued their feud with Máximo and Volador Jr. for the show TRT teamed up with Shocker to defeat Máximo, Volador Jr. and Atlantis. The storyline would eventually lead to the main event of the 2015 Homenaje a Dos Leyenda.

=== December 19, 2014 Results ===
No.	Results	Stipulations
1	Magnus and Oro Jr. defeated Espiritu Negro and Súper Comando	Best two-out-of-three falls tag team match
2	Los Cancerberos del Infierno (Cancerbero, Raziel and Virus) defeated Pegasso, The Panther and Tritón	Six-man "Lucha Libre rules" tag team match
3	Dark Angel, La Vaquerita and Marcela defeated La Amapola, Dalys la Caribeña and La Seductora	Six-man "Lucha Libre rules" tag team match
4	Bárbaro Cavernario defeated Dragón Rojo Jr.	Lighting Match (One fall, 10-minute time limit)
5	Thunder and Los Guerreros Laguneros (Euforia and Último Guerrero) defeated Marco Corleone and Los Ingobernables (La Máscara and La Sombra)	Six-man "Lucha Libre rules" tag team match
6	Shocker and TRT: La Máquina de la Destrucción (Rey Bucanero and El Terrible defeated Atlantis, Máximo and Volador Jr.	Six-man "Lucha Libre rules" tag team match

== December 26, 2014 ==
CMLL Super Viernes
- Promotion: Consejo Mundial de Lucha Libre
- Date: December 26, 2014
- City: Mexico City, Mexico
- Venue: Arena México

CMLL Super Viernes chronology
← Previous; Super Viernes December 19, 2014	Next → Super Viernes January 2, 2015

Mexican professional wrestling, or Lucha libre, promotion Consejo Mundial de Lucha Libre (CMLL) held their 48th and final CMLL Super Viernes show of 2014 on December 26, 2014 in Arena México, Mexico City, Mexico. The main focus of the show was the first round of a tournament for the vacant CMLL World Welterweight Championship. The participants were; Negro Casas, Delta, Fuego, Kamaitachi, Máscara Dorada, Pólvora, Rey Cometa, Sangre Azteca, Titán and Tritón. In the end Negro Casas and Máscara Dorada survived the elimination match and would meet on the following Super Viernes on January 2 to determine the next champion.

=== December 26, 2014 Results ===
No.	Results	Stipulations
1	Flyer and Starman defeated Akuma and El Hijo del Signo	Best two-out-of-three falls tag team match
2	Okumura, Puma and Virus defeated Hombre Bala Jr., Oro Jr. and Super Halcón Jr.	Six-man "Lucha Libre rules" tag team match
3	Brazo de Plata, Guerrero Maya Jr. and The Panther defeated Hechicero and Los Hijos del Averno (Ephesto and Mephisto)	Six-man "Lucha Libre rules" tag team match
4	Máscara Dorada and Negro Casas defeated Delta, Fuego, Kamaitachi, Pólvora, Rey Cometa, Sangre Azteca, Titán and Tritón	Torneo cibernetico 10-man elimination match for the vacant CMLL World Welterweight Championship
5	Mr. Niebla, Rey Bucanero and Shocker defeated Máximo and the Sky Team (Valiente and Volador Jr.)	Six-man "Lucha Libre rules" tag team match
