= Halcón Suriano Jr. =

Mexican professional wrestler

Stukita
Personal information
- Born: May 8, 1994 (age 32) Torreón, Coahuila, Mexico

Professional wrestling career
- Ring name(s): Principe Halcon; Principe Halcon, Jr. Stukita; Halcón Suriano Jr. Tigre Universitario Jr.
- Billed height: 1.62 m (5 ft 4 in)
- Billed weight: 65 kg (143 lb)
- Trained by: Halcón Suriano, Jr. CMLL Wrestling School
- Debut: May 6, 2007

Halcón Suriano Jr./Stukita (born May 8, 1994) is a Mexican professional wrestler, formerly under contract with the promotion Consejo Mundial de Lucha Libre (CMLL). Until the fall of 2018 he worked under the name "Stukita" in CMLL's Mini-Estrella division. Working in the Mini-Estrellas division did not mean that Stukita is a dwarf as several wrestlers who are just shorter in stature work in the "Mini" division.

The name "Stukita" was the diminutive form of "Stuka", as he portrayed a smaller version of wrestlers Stuka and Stuka, Jr. He is a third-generation wrestler with both his father and grandfather being professional wrestlers before him, which he honors by working under the name 'Halcón Suriano Jr." His real name is not a matter of public record, as is often the case with masked wrestlers in Mexico where their private lives are kept a secret from the wrestling fans.

== Personal life ==
Halcón Suriano Jr. is a third-generation professional wrestler, his grandfather Juan José Espinoza Meza wrestled under the ring name "Halcón Suriano" ("Falcon Suriano") until his death in 1993. His father and three of his uncles are or were also professional wrestlers, his father worked under the name Halcón Suriano, Jr. and his uncles as Pequeño Halcón ("Little Falcon"), Príncipe Halcón ("Prince Falcon") and Caballero Halcón ("Falcon Knight"). He is the cousin of Pequeño Halcón, who is the son of the original Pequeño Halcón.

== Professional wrestling career ==
Stukita was trained for a professional wrestling career at a very young age after having grown up in the business watching his father, grandfather and uncles all perform in the ring. Most of his initial training was done by his, deeming him ready for his debut a few days before his thirteenth birthday. Initially he worked under the ring name Principe Halcon, or sometimes Principe Halcon, Jr. after his uncle since his father was already working as "Halcón Suriano Junior" at the time and he did not want to go with "El Niete de Halcón Suriano" ("The Grandson of Halcón Suriano"). He worked on the Mexican Independent circuit around his native Torreón, Coahuila and primarily in the Mini-Estrella division against other wrestlers of short stature or actual little people as is the tradition in Lucha Libre.

=== Stukita (2008–2018) ===
In 2008 he decided to take a new ring identity, one less reliant on his family connections. He became "Stukita", looking and wrestling like a smaller version of Stuka and CMLL wrestler Stuka, Jr. Technically he was the mini of the original Stuka since he did not work for CMLL at the time, but wears a mask identical to Stuka, Jr.'s regular mask. As Stukita he began a storyline feud with fellow Mini-Estrella Indio Loco, that escalated to the point that their issues had to be settled in a Luchas de Apuestas, or bet match where Stukita put his mask on the line and Indio Loco put his hair on the line. The match took place on March 28, 2010, in Torreon. Stukita won the match, his first major victory as he forced Indio Loco to have all his hair shaved off after the match. In most places he worked as a Mini-Estrella, even winning the UWF World Minis Championship from Mini Laredo Kid, but at the time he also worked with regular-sized wrestlers, winning the Federacion Internacional de Lucha Libre (FILL) Lightweight Championship. He also teamed up with his father on several occasions. On August 11, 2012 he was one of 56 competitors in the second annual "Amigo de Siempre" ("Friend forever") Battle Royal, but did not win, instead the victory went to Axxel.

In mid-2012 Stukita began training at CMLL's wrestling school, the first step to becoming a regular wrestler for CMLL, Mexico's largest and the world's oldest wrestling promotion. Stukita trained alongside fellow Mini-Estrella Pequeño Valiente for an eventual CMLL debut. Even though neither Mini-Estrella had made their in-ring debut Stukita and Pequeño Valiente both attended CMLL's celebration of the 20th anniversary of their Mini-Estrellas division, making their first CMLL public appearance. At the time no in-ring debut date was given for the two, but current CMLL Mini-Estrellas were expressing a hope that they would join soon to bolster their division. CMLL holds an annual Bodybuilding contest, open to both CMLL wrestlers and those attending the CMLL wrestling school. On November 28, 2012, Stukita competed in the "Minis" category of the contest and won, placing ahead of CMLL World Mini-Estrella Champion Pequeño Olímpico as well as his cousin Pequeño Halcón. Stukita made his in-ring debut on December 25, 2012, teaming with Shockercito and Fantasy, losing to the team of Demus 3:16, Pequeño Olímpico and Pequeño Black Warrior, although Stukita did win the second fall for his team.

=== Halcón Suriano Jr. (2018–2024) ===
On October 17, 2018 it was announced that Stukita would be known as "Halcón Suriano Jr." from that point on, in honor of his grandfather. He was slated to present the Copa Halcón Suriano trophy as part of the Blue Panther 40th Anniversary Show. His final CMLL match was a tag team victory on March 15, 2024, defeating Emperador Jr. & Platino Kid alongside Leono. By the end of the year, he had changed his name to Tigre Universitario Jr. and debuted for Lucha Libre AAA Worldwide.

== Championships and accomplishments ==
- Consejo Mundial de Lucha Libre
  - CMLL Bodybuilding Contest: 2012 – Mini-Estrella Category
- Federacion Internacional de Lucha Libre
  - FILL Lightweight Championship (1 time)
- Mexican independent circuit
  - UWF World Minis Championship (1 time)
  - Northern Lightweight Championship (1 time)

== Luchas de Apuestas record ==
Winner (wager)	Loser (wager)	Location	Event	Date	Notes
Stukita (mask)	Indio Loco (hair)	Tijuana, Baja California	El Deportivo 'Lee Roy' show	March 28, 2010	
