= CMLL 81st Anniversary Show =

Mexican professional wrestling supercard show

CMLL 81st Anniversary show
- The official poster for the event
- Promotion: Consejo Mundial de Lucha Libre
- Date: September 19, 2014; Air date: September 19, 2014 (Terra.com); October 19, 2014 (SamuraiTV)
- City: Mexico City, Mexico
- Venue: Arena México
- Attendance: Over 17,000
- Tagline(s): "La lucha del siglo" ("The match of the century"); Sin Salida ("No Escape")

Event chronology
| ← Previous; Universal Championship | Next → La Copa Junior VIP |

CMLL Anniversary Shows chronology
| ← Previous; 80th Anniversary | Next → 82nd Anniversary |

The CMLL 81st Anniversary Show (Spanish: 81. Aniversario de CMLL) was a major professional wrestling event produced by Consejo Mundial de Lucha Libre (CMLL) that took place on September 19, 2014, in CMLL's home arena Arena México in Mexico City, Mexico. The event commemorated the 81st anniversary of the creation of CMLL, which is the oldest professional wrestling promotion in the world. CMLL's anniversary show is their biggest, most important show of the year, comparable to the Super Bowl for the National Football League or WrestleMania for World Wrestling Entertainment. The CMLL Anniversary Show series is the longest-running annual professional wrestling show, starting in 1934.

The main event of the show was a best two-out-of-three falls Lucha de Apuestas, or "bet match" between perennial rivals Atlantis and Último Guerrero, with both wrestlers putting their mask on the line. The show featured five more matches. The show made CMLL only the second promotion in the Americas, after WWE, to draw a $1 million gate.

== Production ==
=== Background ===
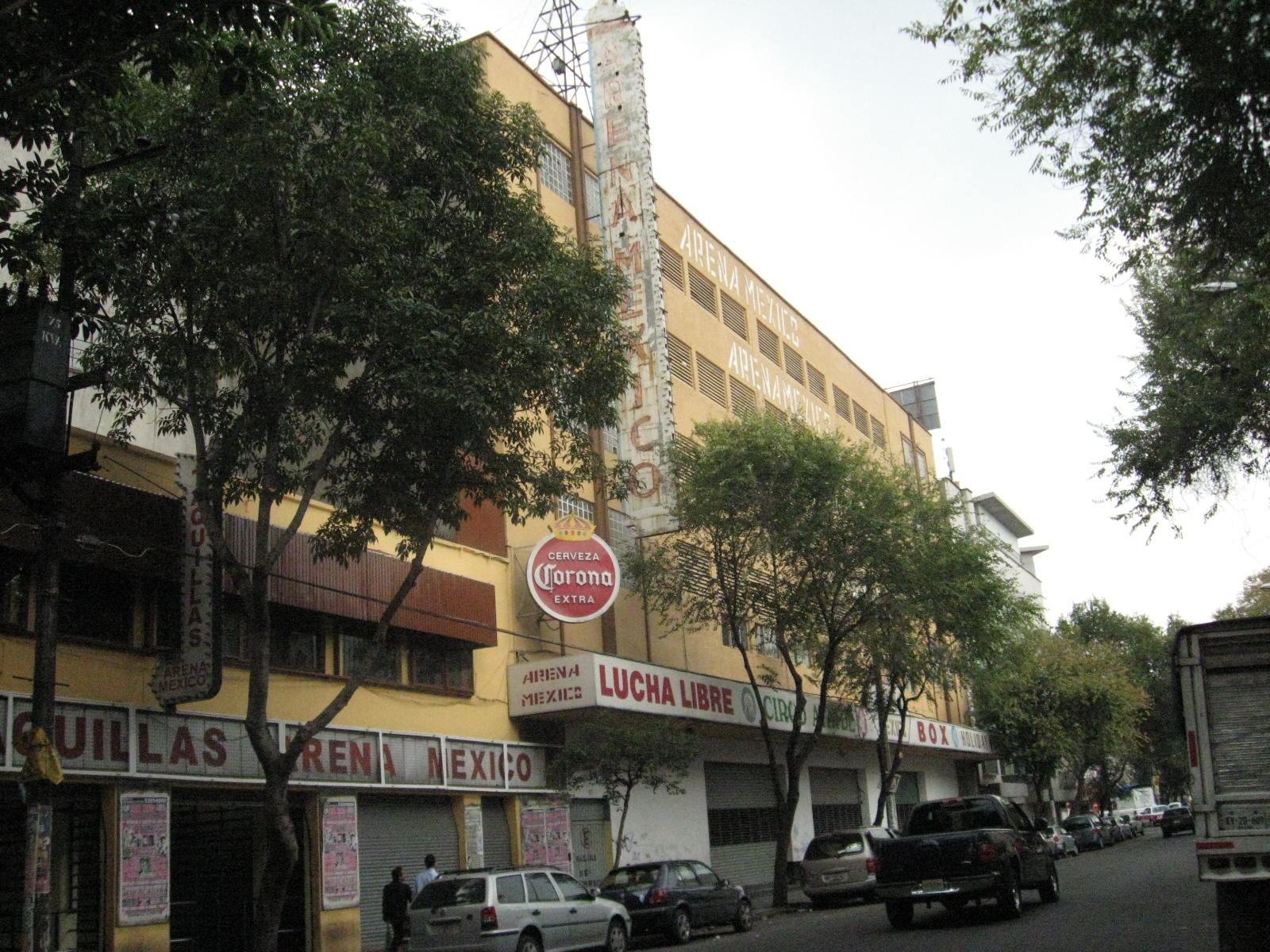
Arena México, CMLL's main venue and location of the 81st Anniversary Show

The Mexican Lucha libre (professional wrestling) company Consejo Mundial de Lucha Libre (CMLL) started out under the name Empresa Mexicana de Lucha Libre ("Mexican Wrestling Company"; EMLL), founded by Salvador Lutteroth in 1933. Lutteroth, inspired by professional wrestling shows he had attended in Texas, decided to become a wrestling promoter and held his first show on September 21, 1933, marking what would be the beginning of organized professional wrestling in Mexico. Lutteroth would later become known as "the father of Lucha Libre" . A year later EMLL held the EMLL 1st Anniversary Show, starting the annual tradition of the Consejo Mundial de Lucha Libre Anniversary Shows that have been held each year ever since, most commonly in September.

Over the years the anniversary show would become the biggest show of the year for CMLL, akin to the Super Bowl for the National Football League (NFL) or WWE's WrestleMania event. The first anniversary show was held in Arena Modelo, which Lutteroth had bought after starting EMLL. In 1942–43 Lutteroth financed the construction of Arena Coliseo, which opened in April 1943. The EMLL 10th Anniversary Show was the first of the anniversary shows to be held in Arena Coliseo. In 1956 Lutteroth had Arena México built in the location of the original Arena Modelo, making Arena México the main venue of EMLL from that point on. Starting with the EMLL 23rd Anniversary Show, all anniversary shows except for the EMLL 46th Anniversary Show have been held in the arena that would become known as "The Cathedral of Lucha Libre". On occasion EMLL held more than one show labelled as their "Anniversary" show, such as two 33rd Anniversary Shows in 1966. Over time the anniversary show series became the oldest, longest-running annual professional wrestling show. In comparison, WWE's WrestleMania is only the fourth oldest still promoted show (CMLL's Arena Coliseo Anniversary Show and Arena México anniversary shows being second and third). EMLL was supposed to hold the EMLL 52nd Anniversary Show on September 20, 1985 but Mexico City was hit by a magnitude 8.0 earthquake. EMLL canceled the event both because of the general devastation but also over fears that Arena México might not be structurally sound after the earthquake.

When Jim Crockett Promotions was bought by Ted Turner in 1988 EMLL became the oldest still active promotion in the world. In 1991 EMLL was rebranded as "Consejo Mundial de Lucha Libre" and thus held the CMLL 59th Anniversary Show, the first under the new name, on September 18, 1992. Traditionally CMLL holds their major events on Friday Nights, replacing their regularly scheduled Super Viernes show.

=== Storylines ===
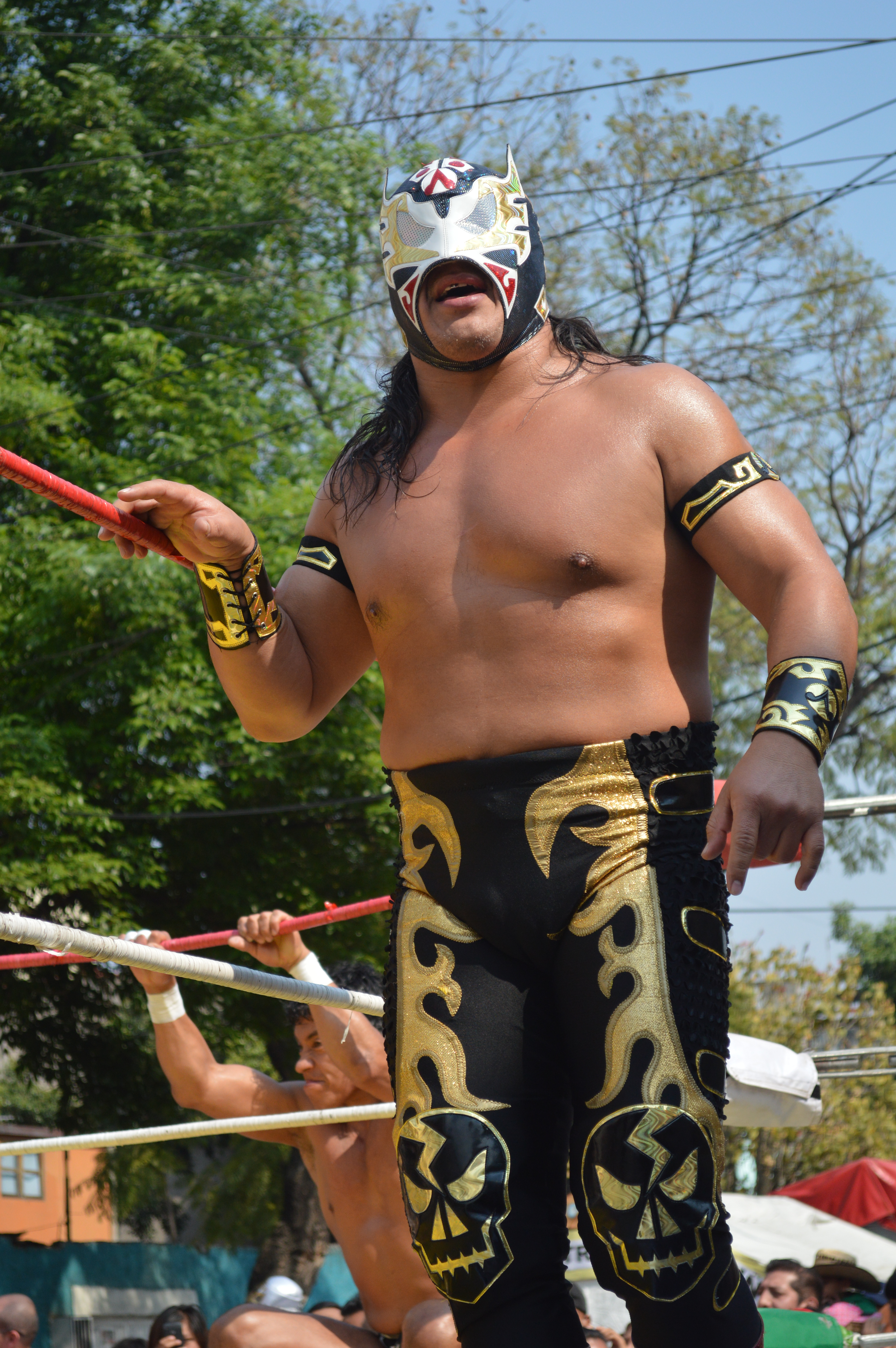
Último Guerrero, one of the participants in the main event.

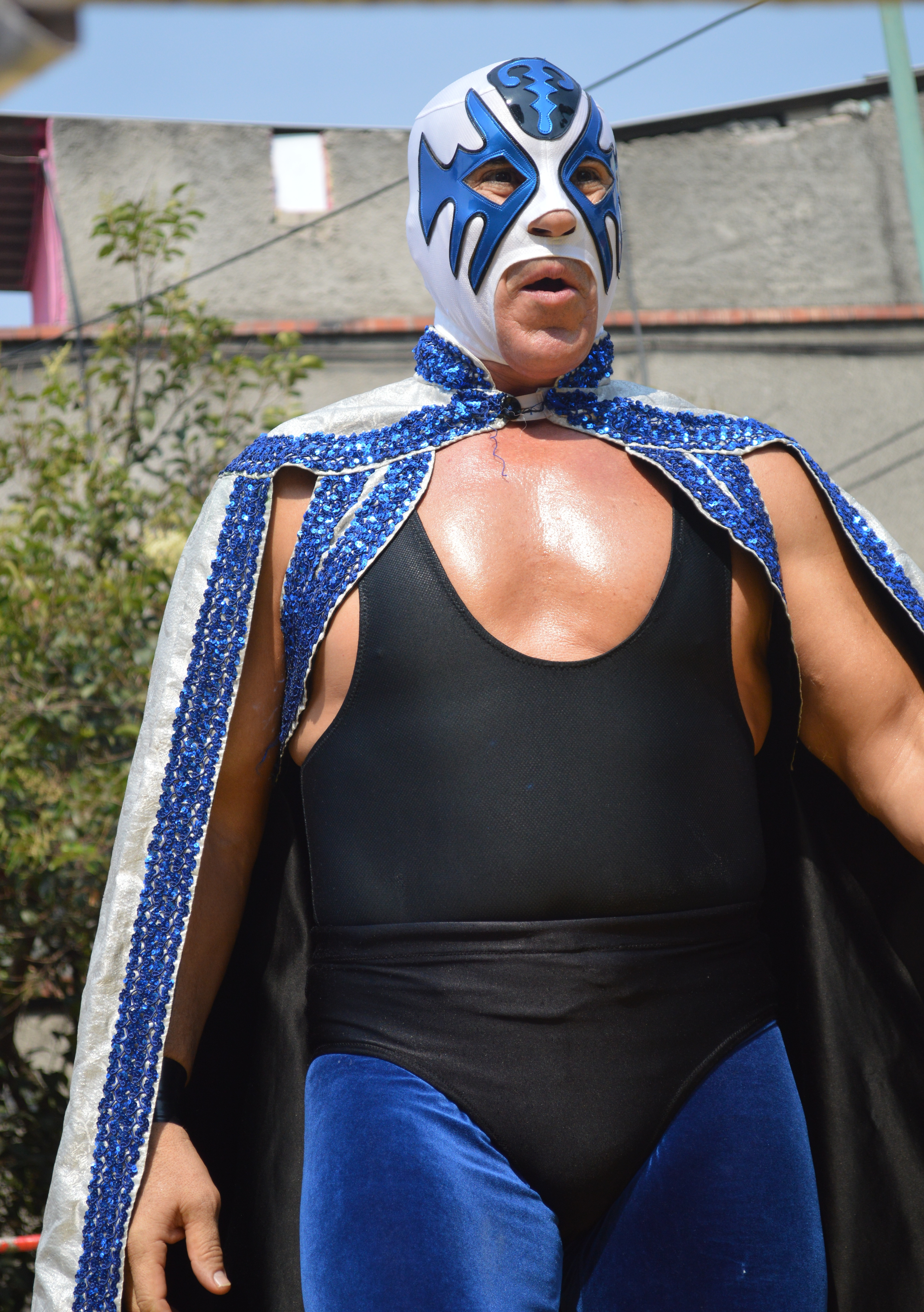
Atlantis, the other participant in the main event match.

The event featured six professional wrestling matches with different wrestlers involved in pre-existing scripted feuds, plots and storylines. Wrestlers were portrayed as either heels (referred to as rudos in Mexico, those that portray the "bad guys") or faces (técnicos in Mexico, the "good guy" characters) as they followed a series of tension-building events, which culminated in a wrestling match or series of matches.

The main event match for the 81st Anniversary show was the culmination of a storyline feud between Atlantis and Último Guerrero that had its start several years prior. In 2005 Atlantis was a well established, veteran tecnico who held the CMLL World Tag Team Championship with Blue Panther. During a match on June 25, 2005 against Guerrero and Rey Bucanero Atlantis turned on his partner during the match and cost them the titles. Following the match the now Rudo Atlantis joined up the group Los Guerreros del Infierno ("The Infernal Warriors"), who renamed the group Los Guerreros de la Atlantida ("The Warriors of Atlantis") out of respect for their new co-leader. Atlantis, Último Guerrero and Negro Casas won the CMLL World Trios Championship and held it for 166 days, before losing it on January 1, 2009, to El Hijo del Fantasma, Héctor Garza and La Máscara. On November 2, 2009, Atlantis won his fourth CMLL World Tag Team Championship, this time teaming with Último Guerrero to defeat Místico and Negro Casas for the championship. They later lost the Tag Team championship to Averno and Mephisto on February 1, 2010. In late 2009 it was rumored that Los Guerreros de la Atlantida had split up, but when Atlantis and Último Guerrero teamed up on CMLL's Sin Salida show, to prove that the rumors were not true. On November 2, 2010, Guerrero and Dragón Rojo, Jr., who replaced an injured Atlantis, defeated Mr. Águila and Héctor Garza to win the CMLL World Tag Team Championship. After the title win, Rojo, Jr. was made an official member of Los Guerreros de la Atlantida. Following Dragón Rojo's induction into the group Atlantis teamed less and less with his team mates. In June, 2011 Atlantis replaced an injured Shocker and teamed with the tecnico team of Delta and Guerrero Maya, Jr. in the Forjando un Ídolo tournament, which they eventually went on to win. After weeks of tension between Atlantis and Último Guerrero, CMLL held a press conference on August 11, where Atlantis officially turned technico and left Los Guerreros de la Atlantida. Guerrero and Atlantis faced each other in a big grudge match on September 23, which saw Atlantis pick up the win. On the August 3 Super Viernes show, Guerrero and Rojo, Jr. lost the CMLL World Tag Team Championship to Atlantis and Diamante Azul, ending their reign at 640 days, the longest reign in the title's history. On November 16, Atlantis announced that he was officially forming a stable named Los Reyes de la Atlantida ("The Kings of Atlantis") with Delta and Guerrero Maya, Jr. to help him combat Los Guerreros del Infierno. On the August 3 Super Viernes show, Atlantis and Diamante Azul defeated Dragón Rojo, Jr. and Último Guerrero to win the CMLL World Tag Team Championship. In early 2013 the long running feud between Atlantis and Último Guerrero came to the forefront of CMLL booking once more. The two were booked for the 2013 Torneo Nacional de Parejas Increibles tournament, forcing the two rivals to team up. Before their qualifying round both Atlantis and Gurrero stated that they would put their differences aside for the sake of the tournament. Atlantis and Guerrero displayed the teamwork they had developed by being partners in Los Guerreros del Atlantida for several years as they defeated the teams of Valiente and Pólvora, Diamante Azul and Euforia and finally Dragón Rojo, Jr. and Niebla Roja to qualify for the finals of the tournament. The finals took place as part of the 2013 Homenaje a Dos Leyendas show and saw La Sombra and Volador, Jr. win the match and the tournament. Following the loss a frustrated Atlantis attacked Último Guerrero and tore his mask apart. Atlantis subsequently made a Luchas de Apuestas challenge to Último Guerrero that was not immediately accepted. The two rivals officially signed the contract for the mask vs. mask match on March 21, but did not announce an actual date for the match. At the same press conference it was announced that CMLL would commemorate Atlantis' 30 year anniversary as a wrestler with a special Super Viernes show on May 3. During the celebration of Atlantis' 30th anniversary as a wrestler Guerrero appeared after a match to berate Atlantis, which turned out to be a distraction for the real Último Guerrero to attack Atlantis from behind. The two identically dressed Guerreros proceeded to beat up Atlantis and tear his mask apart. Following the match Último Guerrero introduced his brother "Gran Guerrero". The much anticipated and hyped Mask vs. Mask match between Guerrero and Atlantis at the 80th Anniversary Show on September 13 never came to fruition as the two were defeated in a Relevos Suicidas match by La Sombra and Volador Jr., who instead advanced to the Lucha de Apuestas against each other. During the semi-final match of the 2014 Juicio Final show Atlantis and Último Guerrero were once again on opposite sides of the six-man tag team match. In the first fall Guerrero pulled Atlantis' mask and pinned him, when Atlantis tried to use the same tactics in the second fall he was disqualified and lost the match for his team. Following the match Guerrero insisted on CMLL officially announcing the match between the two. Moments later Juan Manual Mar, representing the CMLL executive team came to the ring and announced that the two would finally face off in a Lucha de Apuestas match for their masks at the 81st Anniversary show.

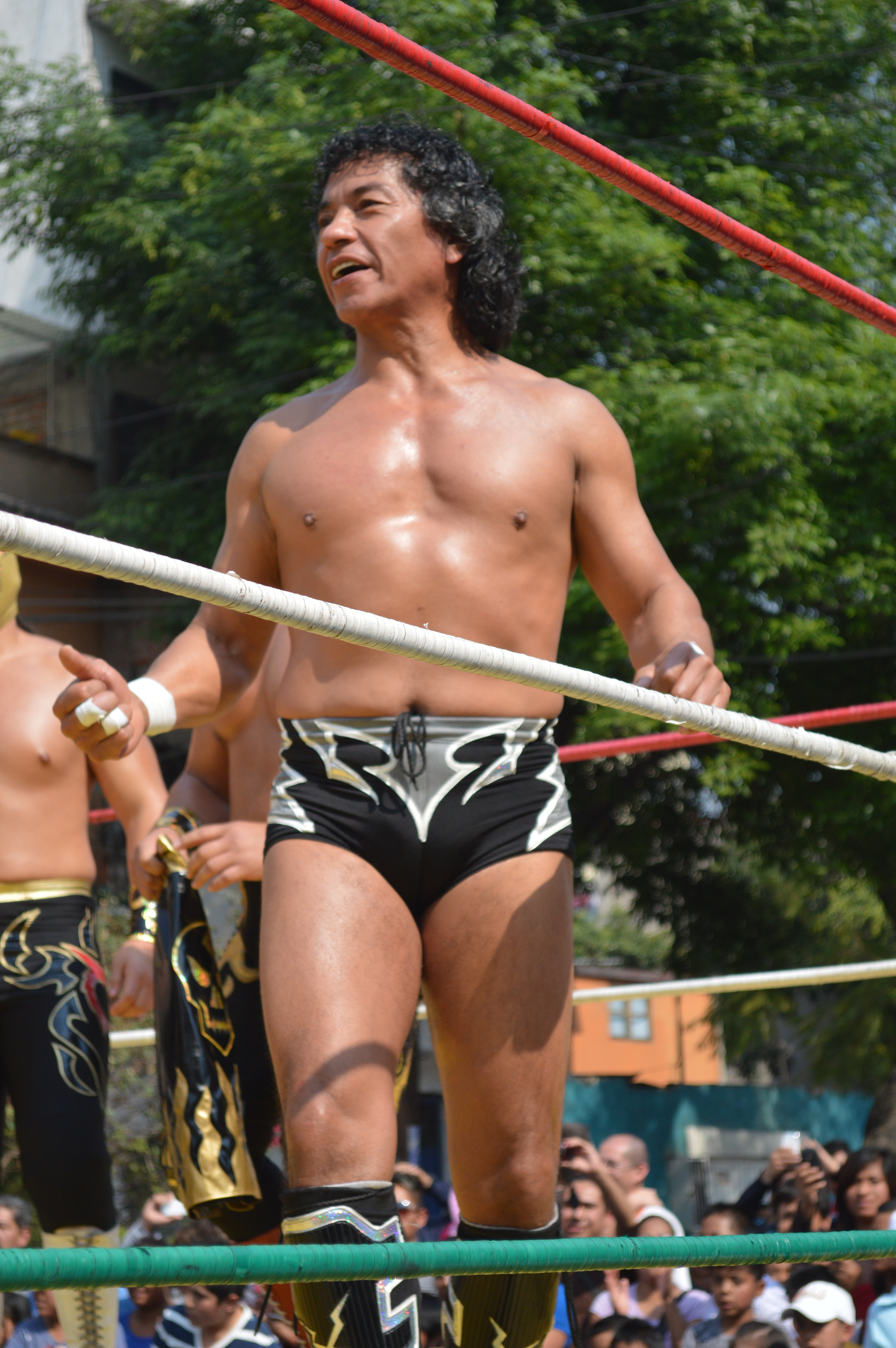
Negro Casas half of defending CMLL World Tag Team Champions.

One of the main storylines of 2014 for CMLL was the emergence of Los Ingobernables ("The Ungovernable" or "The Unruly") as a team, a storyline that had driven the main event of CMLL's two previous major shows Juicio Final and Homenaje a Dos Leyendas. The storyline stretched back into 2013 where the rudo Negro Casas began a rivalry with the tecnico Rush, a tecnico that worked a rougher, harder style and often experienced that the fans would boo him during his matches. By the end of 2013 the storyline began to also include Shocker, who turned rudo and sided with Casas in the feud. The storyline evolved over time and Rush, Casa and Shocker all agreed to a three-way match under Lucha de Apuestas ("Bet match") rules where the loser would be shaved bald. Later on Negro Casas dropped out of the match, declaring that he would rather face the winner and let Rush and Shocker fight each other at the 2014 Homenaje a Dos Leyendas show. Rush defeated Shocker, forcing Shocker to be shaved bald after the event and immediately set his sights on Negro Casas. While Rush had displayed less of a tecnico attitude during his matches against especially Shocker and Casas he never turned rudo as such. Following the Homenaje show Rush began teaming more and more with La Sombra, who was also displaying a more rudo attitude, announcing themselves as "técnicos diferentes" ("A different kind of good guy"). Soon after they were joined by La Máscara, to become a trio known as Los Indeseables ("The Undesirables"), later renamed Ingobernables ("Ungovernables"). Rush and La Máscara held the CMLL World Tag Team Championship at the time of the Ingorbernables creation, but would later lose the title to Negro Casas and Shocker. Following the title loss the focal point became a Luchas de Apuestas match between Rush and Negro Casas that was the main event of the 2014 Juicio Final show, a match that Rush won by underhanded means, forcing Negro Casas to be shaved bald. Following Juicio Final Los Ingorbernables became positioned to challenge La Peste Negra (Casas, El Felino and Mr. Niebla) for the Mexican National Trios Championship, but on September 6, 2014 CMLL announced that Rush and La Mascara would challenge Negro Casas and Shocker for the CMLL World Tag Team Championship as part of the 81st Anniversary show.

2014 marked the year where Cavernario moved from working primarily in CMLL's secondary venues in Guadalajara, Jalisco to working full-time in Mexico City, CMLL's most important venues, gaining national exposure. His first major exposure on a national level was when he was teamed up with veteran wrestler Mr. Niebla for the 2014 Gran Alternativa ("Great Alternative") tournament, a tournament specifically designed to showcase younger wrestlers. Cavernario and Mr. Niebla was successful and won the tournament and the two worked so well together that Cavernario was invited to join Mr. Niebla's group La Peste Negra. Over the summer of 2014 Cavernario was one of 8 wrestlers competing in CMLL's En Busca de un Ídolo ("In search of an idol") tournament, actually ending up winning the entire tournament when he defeated Hechicero in the finals. Later on Cavernario began a rivalry with Rey Cometa as they found themselves on opposite sides of six-man tag team matches where they would single each other out during the matches. On September 5, 2014 the two faced off in a 1-on-1 Lighting match on CMLL's Super Viernes show, a match that ended with the two wrestling to a very intense 10 minute time limit draw. After the match Rey Cometa challenged his opponent to put his hair on the line in a Luchas de Apuestas match, the young Cavernario almost immediately accepted the challenge and the match was booked for the 81st Anniversary Show as the second Apuestas match of the night. The following day CMLL officially announced that Rey Cometa and Cavernario would meet in the 4th match of the show. Prior to this Apuestas match Rey Cometa had competed in four Apuestas matching, only losing one, where he was forced to unmask. Cavernario had competed in a total of five Apuestas matches, like Rey Cometa only losing one, which had forced him to unmask. The previously injured tecnico Thunder reappeared in CMLL after a 7-month absence during the semi-main event of the September 5 Super Viernes show, coming to the ring during the third fall of a match between the tecnico team of Atlantis, Dragón Rojo, Jr. and Volador Jr. fighting rivals Gran Guerrero, Rey Escorpión and Último Guerrero. Initially he acted like he was helping the good guys out, only to turn on Volador Jr. attacking him during the match. While the act caused the team of the Guerreros and Rey Escorpión to lose by disqualification it became clear that Último Guerrero was ordering Thunder to continue to attack Volador Jr. even after the bell had rung. The intensity of the attack was underlined by Volador Jr. having to be taken from the arena on a stretcher. The following day it was announced that the returning and now rudo Thunder would team up with Mr. Niebla and Euforia in the third match of the night, facing his newfound victim Volador Jr. who would team up with Máscara Dorada and Valiente in what would be the first in-ring meeting between these newfound rivals.

On Monday August 18 CMLL announced the second match of the show, an eight-woman elimination match called La Copa 81 Aniversario ("The 81st Anniversary Cup"). The announced participants included the then reigning CMLL World Women's Champion Marcela, the Mexican National Women's Champion Estrellita, CMLL-Reina International Champion La Amapola, Dalys la Caribeña, Goya Kong, Princesa Sugehit, Tiffany and Zeuxis. The exact teams or format was not announced at the time. On Monday August 25 CMLL announced another match, the opening match of the show, which was to be a Best two out of three falls tag team match featuring the brother duo of Puma and Tiger taking on the rookie team of Cachorro and Dragon Lee. The match would mark the first Anniversary Show appearance of both Cachorro and Dragon Lee as both had made their debut less than a year ago as well as Tiger, who while having been in CMLL for a number of years, had yet to wrestle a match on an Anniversary Show. Puma had wrestled on the CMLL 79th Anniversary Show two years prior where he defeated and unmasked Rey Cometa in one of the feature matches. Throughout 2014 Tiger and Puma had developed a storyline rivalry with another team of second-generation brothers, Cachorro and Black Panther, a storyline that also included Tiger and Puma's father El Felino and Cachorro and Black Panther's father Blue Panther. Cachorro and Dragon Lee had not teamed on a regular basis before the match was announced, in fact the two had faced off in friendly competition in CMLL's La Copa Junior and En Busca de un Ídolo ("In search of an idol") tournaments. On September 6 CMLL announced a change to the match, adding Blue Panther and El Felino to the two sides, making it a traditional Six-man "Lucha Libre rules" tag team match and an extension of the long running storyline between Los Divinos Laguneros ("The Divine from the Lagoon", Blue Panther, Cachorro and Black Panther) and La Dinastia Casas (The Casas Dynasty", Felino, Tiger, Puma).

== Event ==
Before the wrestling portion of the show began La Sonora Dinamita performed for the fans in the arena as well as anyone viewing the event live on the Internet. After the show the ring announcers Miguel Linares, Leonardo Magadan and Jesus Zuniga taped various introduction segments to be used when the Anniversary show would be broadcast on television at a later date. Fans were still entering the building during the first match as there were large areas of empty seats during this match, something that would change over time as Arena México looking to be at more or less full capacity by the time the third match started.

Cachorro, one of the participants in the opening match came to the ring wearing a special wrestling mask, with half the mask being inspired by the blue/white design that his father Blue Panther originally wore and the other half a more ornate, black and white mask of his other partner Dragon Lee. Cachorro removed the mask before the actual match and wrestled wearing his regular designed mask. The tecnico team of Panther, Cachorro and Dragon Lee won the first fall when Blue Panther forced the rudo team captain El Felino to submit after applying a Standing figure four leglock, one of Blue Panther's signature moves known as El Nudo Lagunero ("The Lagoon Knot"). In the second fall of the match Puma pinned Cachorro, then Tiger pinned Blue Panther to even the match to one fall each, going to the third and deciding factor. In the third fall Cachorro forced Tiger to submit to an armbar followed by Dragon Lee pinning Puma to win the third and deciding fall for his side.

The second match of the night featured CMLL's women's wrestling division as eight ladies competed for the La Copa 81 Aniversario ("81st Anniversary Cup") trophy in an elimination match. Dalys la Caribeña, one of the eight participants, came to the ring dressed like a winged Greek character, complete with a Greek soldier's helmet, leather strap outfit and both her face and body painted in black and red colors. She removed the attached wings and the metal helmet before the match. The teams were divided between the four tecnicas (Marcela, Estrellita, Princesa Sigehit and Goya Kong) facing off against the ruda team (La Amapola, Tiffany, Dalys and Zeuxis). After several minutes of wrestling, with all participants taking turns in the ring Tiffany was the first wrestler eliminated when Princesa Sugehit pinned her. Moments later the sides were evened out when La Amapola pinned the Mexican National Women's Champion Estrellita to eliminate her. From that point each elimination came quickly after each other, generally alternating between the two sides with Dalys, then Princesa Sugeith, then Goya Kong and finally La Amapola being eliminated leaving only Zeuxis and Marcela, the CMLL Women's World Champion. In the end Zeuxis completed the upset by defeating Marcel after also being instrumental in eliminating Princesa Sugeith and Goya Kong, winning the match. After the match Zeuxis posed with a trophy while celebrating her victory.

After the second match of the evening CMLL officials came to the ring to have a minute of applause from the audience in honor of Manuel Robles that had died earlier in the day at an advanced age. Robles started his wrestling career in the late 1940s alongside his three brothers, who became known as Sugi Sito, Huroki Sito and Panchito Robles. Robles was the father of head of CMLL booking Juan Manuel Mar, also referred to as Panico as well as the grandfather of CMLL luchadors Skándalo and Stigma who both worked for CMLL as well.

Volador Jr. had a long-standing tradition of dressing up like various super heroes for significant matches, especially Marvel Comics super heroes such as Spider-Man, Venom and Iron Man, and for the 81st Anniversary continued the tradition coming to the ring dressed in black with a giant white skull on his chest to resemble the character The Punisher. While he wore a mask during his introductions, Volador Jr. removed it for the match as he was no longer allowed to wrestle while masked, due to a loss he suffered at the previous anniversary show. Mr. Niebla, along with his Mascota Perico came to the ring dressed in garb resembling members of the Rock band Kiss, with Mr. Niebla's mask resembling the face paint that Gene Simmons wears when performing on stage. This was Thunder's first match as a rudo, showcasing a new mask that was primarily black with a few red and yellow highlights. Before the match Thunder attacked Volador Jr. again and threw him outside the ring. To sell the brutality of Thunder's attack Volador Jr. was on the floor for the majority of the first fall, leaving Máscara Dorada and Valiente to wrestle the first fall by themselves. During the first fall Thunder stayed on the apron, seemingly more focused on Volador Jr. than the other opponents. The first fall was won by Valiente and Dorada when Valiente pinned Euforia while Máscara Dorada pinned Mr. Niebla. Between the falls Volador Jr. returned to the match, ready to fight. During the second fall Thunder finally entered the ring, throwing his opponents around to showcase his greater size and strength compared to his opponents. At one point Dorada, Valiente, Eurforia and Mr. Niebla were all on the floor when Thunder grabbed Volador Jr. by the trunks and the throat and tossing him over the top rope onto the other four wrestlers. The brutality of his actions got Thunder's team disqualified, losing the match in two falls, something that did not bother Thunder as he was more interested in showing his physical dominance against the smaller opponents.

== Results ==
| No. | Results | Stipulations | Times |
|---|---|---|---|
| 1 | Los Divinos Laguneros (Blue Panther and Cachorro) and Dragon Lee defeated La Dinastia Casas (El Felino, Puma and Tiger) – two falls to one: First fall: Blue Panther forced El Felino to submit (1:0); Second fall: Puma pinned Cachorro, Tiger pinned Blue Panther (1:1); Third fall: Cachorro forced Tiger to submit, Dragon Lee pinned Puma (2:1) | Six-man "Lucha Libre rules" tag team match | 19:57 |
| 2 | Zeuxis defeated La Amapola, Dalys la Caribeña, Estrellita, Marcela, Goya Kong, Princesa Sugehit and Tiffany | La Copa 81 Aniversario, eight-woman Torneo cibernetico elimination match | 20:49 |
| 3 | Máscara Dorada, Valiente and Volador Jr. defeated Mr. Niebla, Euforia and Thunder – two falls to none by disqualification: First Fall: Valiente pinned Euforia, Máscara Dorada pinned Mr. Niebla (1:0); Second Fall: Thunder is disqualified (2:0) | Six-man "Lucha Libre rules" tag team match | 09:05 |
| 4 | Cavernario defeated Rey Cometa – two falls to one: First fall: Cavernario pinned Rey Cometa (1:0); Second fall: Rey Cometa pinned Cavernario (1:1); Third fall: Cavernario forced Rey Cometa to submit (2:1) | Best two-out-of-three falls Lucha de Apuestas hair vs. hair match. | 17:27 |
| 5 | Negro Casas and Shocker (c) defeated Los Ingobernables (La Mascara and Rush) – two falls to one: First fall: Rush pinned Shocker, La Mascara forced Casas to submit (1:0); Second fall: Shocker pinned La Mascara, Casas pinned Rush (1:1); Third fall: Shocker forced La Mascara to submit, Casas pinned Rush (2:1) | Best two-out-of-three falls tag team match for the CMLL World Tag Team Championship | 20:42 |
| 6 | Atlantis defeated Último Guerrero – two falls to one: First fall: Guerrero pinned Atlantis (1:0); Second fall: Atlantis forced Guerrero to submit (1:1); Third fall: Atlantis forced Guerrero to submit (2:1) | Best two-out-of-three falls Lucha de Apuestas mask vs. mask match | 17:53 |
(c) / – the champion(s) heading into the match

La Copa 81 Aniversario Order of elimination

| Elimination | Wrestler | Eliminated by |
|---|---|---|
| 1 | Tiffany | Princesa Sugehit |
| 2 | Estrellita | La Amapola |
| 3 | Dalys la Caribeña | Goya Kong |
| 4 | Princesa Sugehit | Zeuxis |
| 5 | Goya Kong | La Amapola |
| 6 | La Amapola | Marcela |
| 7 | Marcela | Zeuxis |
| Winner: | Zeuxis | |
