= Infierno en el Ring (2016) =

Mexican professional wrestling event

- Official poster of the event showin all 10 steel cage match competitors
- Promotion: Consejo Mundial de Lucha Libre
- Date: December 25, 2016
- City: Mexico City, Mexico
- Venue: Arena México
- Tagline(s): 10 Amazonas en jaula

Pay-per-view chronology
← Previous; Leyenda de Azul	Next → Sin Piedad

Infierno en el Ring chronology
← Previous; 2015	Next → —

Infierno en el Ring (2016) (Spanish for "Inferno in the Ring") was a major professional wrestling event produced and scripted by the Mexican lucha libre promotion Consejo Mundial de Lucha Libre (CMLL) that took place on Friday December 25, 2016 in Arena México, Mexico City, Mexico. The show replaced CMLL's regularly scheduled CMLL Super Viernes show as is tradition with most of CMLL's signature events. The 2016 event marked the eight time CMLL has held a show under that name with previous shows in 2008, 2009, 2010, 2012, 2013, 2014 and 2015. Each of the shows has featured a main event, multi-man steel cage match, contested under Lucha de Apuestas, or bet match rules referred to as Infierno en el Ring. According to the rules the loser of the match, the last person to remain in the cage, would be forced to have his hair shaved off per Lucha Libre traditions.

The 2016 Infierno en el Ring event was the second time that female competitors were in the steel cage as La Jarochita, Sanely, Princesa Sugehit, La Vaquerita, Metálica and Zeuxis put their mask on the line while Marcela, Estellita, Dalys and La Amapola risked their hair on the outcome of the match. After eight women escaped the ring Zeuxis pinned La Vaquerita, forcing her to unmask and reveal her real name, Isabel Ordóñez Martínez, per lucha libre traditions. The show featured four additional matches and was shown live on CMLL's YouTube channel.

== Production ==
=== Background ===
The Mexican wrestling company Consejo Mundial de Lucha Libre (Spanish for "World Wrestling Council"; CMLL) has held a number of major shows over the years using the moniker Infierno en el Ring ("Inferno in the Ring"), all of which were main evented by a multi-man steel cage match, the eponymous Infierno en el Ring match. CMLL has use the Infierno en el Ring match on other shows, but will intermittently hold a show billed specifically as Infierno en el Ring, with the first such show held in 2008. The show has been an annual feature since 2012, with 2016 being the fifth year in a row CMLL held an Infierno en el Ring show. In 2012 and 2013 it was a summer show, but since 2014 it has been held in December.

All Infierno en el Ring shows have been held in Arena México in Mexico City, Mexico which is CMLL's main venue, its promotional "home". In 2016 the show was held on December 25 as part of CMLL's Christmas/New Year's celebrations that also included Sin Piedad on January 1, 2017. A few days after the press conference it was announced that the show would be streamed live on CMLL's YouTube channel, something CMLL normally did not do for their Sunday shows.

=== Storylines ===
The event featured five professional wrestling matches with different wrestlers involved in pre-existing scripted feuds, plots and storylines. Wrestlers portrayed as either heels (referred to as rudos in Mexico, those that portray the "bad guys") or faces (técnicos in Mexico, the "good guy" characters) as they followed a series of tension-building events, which culminated in a wrestling match or series of matches.

== Results ==
No.	Results	Stipulations	Times
1	Astral and Shockercito defeated Pequeño Olímpico and Pierrothito	Best two-out-of-three falls tag team match	11:40
2	Boby Z, Vangellys and Virus defeated Drone, Johnny Idol and Star Jr.	Best two-out-of-three falls six-woman "Lucha Libre rules" tag team match	12:23
3	Gran Guerrero, Rey Bucanero and El Terrible defeated Stuka Jr., Titán and Valiente	Best two-out-of-three falls six-man "Lucha Libre rules" tag team match	19:24
4	Atlantis, Marco Corleone and Volador Jr. defeated La Peste Negra (Bárbaro Cavernario, El Felino and Negro Casas)	Best two-out-of-three falls six-man "Lucha Libre rules" tag team match	09:07
5	Zeuxis defeated La Vaquerita; Also in the cage: La Jarochita, Sanely, Princesa Sugehit, Marcela, Estellita, Dalys, La Amapola and Metálica	10-Woman steel cage elimination match contested under Lucha de Apuestas, mask vs. hair match	25:01

Cage match escape order

#	Name	Time
1	La Amapola	06:06
2	Metálica	09:20
3	Sanely	11:37
4	Dalys	13:39
5	La Jarochita	15:03
6	Marcela	16:16
7	Estrellita	17:15
8	Princesa Sugehit	21:51
