= Infierno en el Ring (2015) =

Mexican professional wrestling supercard show

- Official poster for the show depicting the twelve wrestlers in the main event along with Carístico and Cibernético
- Promotion: Consejo Mundial de Lucha Libre
- Date: December 25, 2015
- City: Mexico City, Mexico
- Venue: Arena México
- Tagline(s): 12 Mascaras en juego en Jaula (12 masks on the line in the cage)

Pay-per-view chronology
← Previous; Universal Championship	Next → Sin Piedad

Infierno en el Ring chronology
← Previous; 2014	Next → 2016

Infierno en el Ring (2015) (Spanish for "Inferno in the Ring") was a major professional wrestling pay-per-view (PPV) event that will be produced by the Mexican lucha libre promotion Consejo Mundial de Lucha Libre (CMLL) that took place on Friday December 25, 2015 in Arena México, Mexico City, Mexico. The show replaced CMLL's regularly scheduled CMLL Super Viernes show as is tradition with most of CMLL's signature events. The 2015 event marked the seventh time CMLL has held a show under that name with previous shows in 2008, 2009, 2010, 2012, 2013 and 2014. Each of the shows were main evented by a multi-man steel cage match, contested under Lucha de Apuestas, or bet match rules referred to as Infierno en el Ring. According to the rules the loser of the match, the last person to remain in the cage, would be forced to have his hair shaved off per Lucha Libre traditions.

The main event of the show saw 12 men put their mask on the line in the cage, with Súper Comando ending up being unmasked as a result of his loss. The show was offered as an internet-Pay Per View, but suffered major issues during the first three matches of the show. The show featured five matches in total, including the CMLL debut of Cibernético who worked for CMLL's main rival AAA for over 20 years.

== Production ==
=== Background ===
The Mexican wrestling company Consejo Mundial de Lucha Libre (Spanish for "World Wrestling Council"; CMLL) has held a number of major shows over the years using the moniker Infierno en el Ring ("Inferno in the Ring"), all of which were main evented by a multi-man steel cage match, the eponymous Infierno en el Ring match. CMLL has use the Infierno en el Ring match on other shows, but will intermittently hold a show billed specifically as Infierno en el Ring, with the first such show held in 2008. It is not an annually recurring show, but instead held intermittently sometimes several years apart and not always in the same month of the year either. All Infierno en el Ring shows have been held in Arena México in Mexico City, Mexico which is CMLL's main venue, its "home". Traditionally CMLL holds their major events on Friday Nights, which means the Infierno en el Ring shows replace their regularly scheduled Super Viernes show. For 2015 the show will be held on December 25, part of CMLL's Christmas celebrations. A few days after the press conference it was announced that the show would be available as an Internet Pay Per View both in and outside of Mexico, the second ever Internet PPV promoted by CMLL after the CMLL 82nd Anniversary Show.

=== Storylines ===
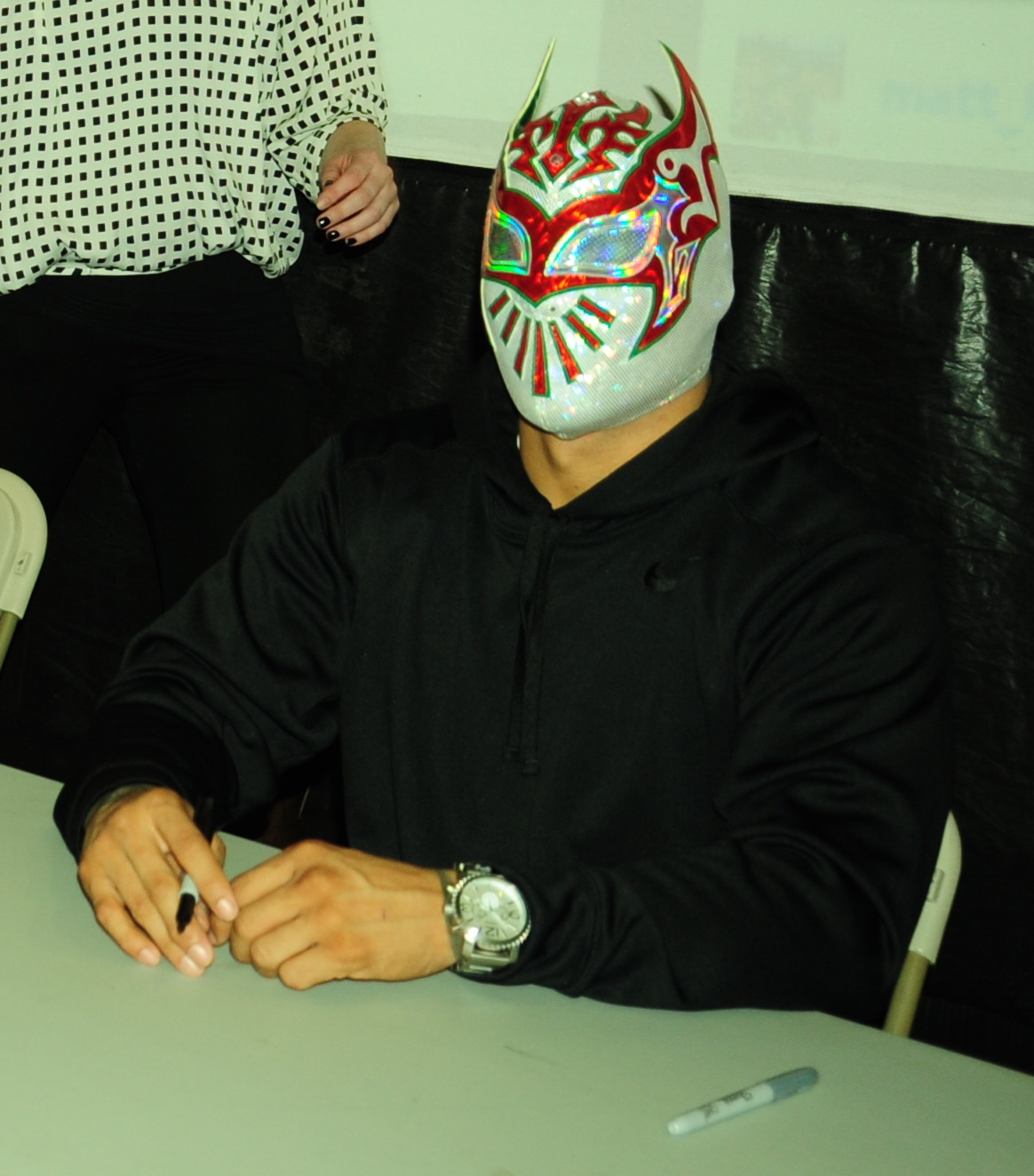
Carístico, the original Místico, teaming with the current Místico on the show.

The event featured five professional wrestling matches with different wrestlers involved in pre-existing scripted feuds, plots and storylines. Wrestlers portrayed as either heels (referred to as rudos in Mexico, those that portray the "bad guys") or faces (técnicos in Mexico, the "good guy" characters) as they followed a series of tension-building events, which culminated in a wrestling match or series of matches.

The road to the Infierno en el RIng cage match saw a number of different rivalries either initiate or intensify as the twelve men risking their masks built to the December 25 show. One of the focal points of the match was the storyline rivalry that had developed between the young tecnico The Panther and the more experienced rudo Súper Comando during a match on CMLL's Super Viernes show where The Panther teamed up with Hombre Bala Jr. and Super Halcón Jr. to defeat Súper Comando, his brother Artillero (collectively known as Los Hombres del Camoflaje; Spanish for "Men in Camouflage") and Sangre Azteca by disqualification due to excessive violence from the rudo team. In subsequent weeks the two face off several times, with Súper Comando using illegal tactics to beat up the Panther and at time tear Panther's mask up.

The storyline between the third-generation of the Casas family, specifically Puma and Tiger and the second-generation of the Panther family, Blue Panther Jr. and The Panther, played off the long running rivalry between Negro Casas (Uncle of Puma and Tiger) and Blue Panther, the father of both Panthers. The rivalry between the two families had been going on for years, with the storyline returning to the forefront of CMLL programming in the fall of 2015, expanding the number of wrestlers feuding throughout the fall. In early December CMLL announced that Súper Comando, The Panther, Blue Panther Jr., Puma and Tiger would join 7 other wrestlers, Cancerbero, Esfinge, Fuego, Pegasso, Raziel, Sangre Azteca and Tritón in the main event of the 2015 Infierno en el Ring show. During a press conference featuring all 12 competitors Puma made reference to Súper Comando being an "old man", something the 34-year old Súper Comando objected to, stating that he might have to teach Puma a lesson during the cage match. The week before the cage match all twelve wrestlers faced off in a torneo cibernetico elimination match, which saw The Panther and Súper Comando face off several times and also saw Súper Comando and Puma clash despite being on the same team. Puma was partially responsible for Súper Comando being eliminated from the match. In the end Puma pinned Tritón to win the match.

== Event ==
The event was supposed to be broadcast live on internet-Pay Per View but due to technical difficulties the first two matches were not shown at all and the third match was only partially transmitted. During the event CMLL stated on Twitter that the problem was not on their end but with the PPV provide Cleeng. The transmission was reestablished during the third match of the night.

The third match of the night, between the teams of Máximo Sexy, Super Parka and Valiente fighting against Negro Casas, Kamaitachi and Cavernario ended in a disqualification when Kamaitachi landed an illegal low kick to Máximo Sexy's groin, causing the disqualification in the final fall. Following the match CMLL match makers came to the ring and signed two Luchas de Apuestas matches for the following week's Sin Piedad show, Kamaitacho against Máximo Sexy and Super Parka against Negro Casas.

== Results ==
No.	Results	Stipulations	Times
1	Estrellita, Lluvia and La Vaquerita defeated Dalys, Tiffany and La Seductora	Best two-out-of-three falls six-woman "Lucha Libre rules" tag team match	—
2	Blue Panther, Brazo de Plata and Stuka Jr. defeated Kraneo, Pólvora and Vangellys	Best two-out-of-three falls six-man "Lucha Libre rules" tag team match	—
3	Máximo Sexy, Super Parka and Valiente defeated Negro Casas, Kamaitachi and Cavernario by disqualification	Best two-out-of-three falls six-man "Lucha Libre rules" tag team match	—
4	Cibernético, Volador Jr. and Último Guerrero defeated Carístico, Místico and Rush	Best two-out-of-three falls six-man "Lucha Libre rules" tag team match	10:23
5	The Panther defeated Súper Comando; Also in the cage: Blue Panther Jr., Cancerbero, Esfinge, Fuego, Pegasso, Puma, Raziel, Sangre Azteca, Tiger and Tritón	12-man steel cage elimination match contested under Lucha de Apuestas, mask vs. mask match rules.	23:35

Cage match escape order

- Esfinge (05:06)
- Puma (06:10)
- Pegasso (07:03)
- Cancerbero (07:58)
- Tritón (08:41)
- Tiger (10:04)
- Blue Panther Jr. (11:09)
- Sangre Azteca (13:11)
- Fuego (15:23)
- Raziel (17:39)
