= Infierno en el Ring (2014) =

Mexican professional wrestling supercard show

- Promotion: Consejo Mundial de Lucha Libre
- Date: December 5, 2014
- City: Mexico City, Mexico
- Venue: Arena México
- Tagline(s): 10 Caballeras en juego en Jaula; 10 scalps on the line in the cage

Pay-per-view chronology
| ← Previous; Día de Muertos | Next → Pequeño Reyes del Aire |

Infierno en el Ring chronology
| ← Previous; 2013 | Next → 2015 |

Infierno en el Ring (2014) (Spanish for "Inferno in the Ring") was a major professional wrestling event produced by the Mexican lucha libre promotion Consejo Mundial de Lucha Libre (CMLL) and took place on Friday December 5, 2014 in Arena México, Mexico City, Mexico. The show replaced CMLL's regularly scheduled CMLL Super Viernes show as is tradition with most of CMLL's signature events. The 2014 even marked the sixth time CMLL has held a show under that name with previous shows in 2008, 2009, 2010, 2012 and 2013. Each of the shows have been main evented by a multi-man steel cage match, contested under Lucha de Apuestas, or bet match rules referred to as Infierno en el Ring. According to the rules the loser of the match, the last person to remain in the cage, will be forced to have his hair shaved off per Lucha Libre traditions. The event itself was announced on November 14. Five days later CMLL announced the 10 wrestlers competing in the main event; Blue Panther, El Felino, Shocker, El Terrible, Rey Bucanero, Máximo, Bárbaro Cavernario, Último Guerrero, Volador Jr. and Marco Corleone. The show featured an additional four matches.

== Production ==
=== Background ===
The Mexican wrestling company Consejo Mundial de Lucha Libre (Spanish for "World Wrestling Council"; CMLL) has held a number of major shows over the years using the moniker Infierno en el Ring ("Inferno in the Ring"), all of which were main evented by a multi-man steel cage match, the eponymous Infierno en el Ring match. CMLL has use the Infierno en el Ring match on other shows, but will intermittently hold a show billed specifically as Infierno en el Ring, with the first such show held in 2008. It is not an annually recurring show, but instead held intermittently sometimes several years apart and not always in the same month of the year either. All Infierno en el Ring shows have been held in Arena México in Mexico City, Mexico which is CMLL's main venue, its "home". Traditionally CMLL holds their major events on Friday Nights, which means the Infierno en el Ring shows replace their regularly scheduled Super Viernes show. The 2014 Infierno en el Ring show was the sixth show to use the name.

=== Storylines ===
The event featured five professional wrestling matches with different wrestlers involved in pre-existing scripted feuds, plots and storylines. Wrestlers were portrayed as either heels (referred to as rudos in Mexico, those that portray the "bad guys") or faces (técnicos in Mexico, the "good guy" characters) as they followed a series of tension-building events, which culminated in a wrestling match or series of matches. During a press conference on November 19 CMLL announced all 10 participants in the main event match; Blue Panther, El Felino, Shocker, El Terrible. Rey Bucanero, Máximo, Bárbaro Cavernario, Último Guerrero, Volador Jr. and Marco Corleone.

== Results ==
| No. | Results | Stipulations |
|---|---|---|
| 1 | Tritón and Pegasso defeated Canelo Casas and Disturbio | Best two-out-of-three falls tag team match |
| 2 | Fuego, Rey Cometa and Stuka Jr. defeated Virus and La Fiebre Amarilla (Okumura and Kamaitachi) | Best two-out-of-three falls six-man "Lucha Libre rules" tag team match |
| 3 | Brazo de Plata, Dragón Rojo Jr. and Titán defeated Vangelis and Los Invasores (Mr. Águila and Kraneo) | Best two-out-of-three falls six-man "Lucha Libre rules" tag team match |
| 4 | La Máscara, Máscara Dorada and Valiente defeated Thunder and Los Guerreros Lagunero (Euforia and Gran Guerrero) | Best two-out-of-three falls six-man "Lucha Libre rules" tag team match |
| 5 | Rey Bucanero defeated El Felino; Also in the match: Bárbaro Cavernario, Blue Panther, Marco Corleone, Máximo, Shocker, El Terrible, Último Guerrero and Volador Jr. | 10-man steel cage elimination match contested under Lucha de Apuestas, hair vs. hair match rules. |
