= Homenaje a Dos Leyendas (2016) =

Mexican professional wrestling supercard show

- Official poster for the show featuring the four wrestlers risking their hair
- Promotion: Consejo Mundial de Lucha Libre
- Date: March 18, 2016
- City: Mexico City, Mexico
- Venue: Arena México

Pay-per-view chronology
← Previous; Fantastica Mania	Next → Torneo Gran Alternativa

Homenaje a Dos Leyendas chronology
← Previous; 2015	Next → 2017

Homenaje a Dos Leyendas (2016) (Spanish for "Homage to Two Legends") was a professional wrestling pay-per-view show event, scripted and produced by Consejo Mundial de Lucha Libre (CMLL; "World Wrestling Council"). The Dos Leyendas show took place on March 18, 2016 in CMLL's main venue, Arena México, Mexico City, Mexico. The event was to honor and remember CMLL founder Salvador Lutteroth, who died in March 1987. Starting in 1999 CMLL honored not just their founder during the show, but also a second lucha libre legend, making it their version of a Hall of Fame event. For the 2016 show CMLL commemorated the life and career of wrestler Lizmark. This was the 18th March show held under the Homenaje a Dos Leyendas name, having previously been known as Homenaje a Salvador Lutteroth from 1996 to 1998.

The Dos Leyendas show featured two Lucha de Apuestas, hair vs. hair matches in the main event and the fourth match of the show. In the main event Volador Jr. defeated Negro Casas, which meant Casas had his hair shaved off. In the other Apuesta match Rush defeated former tag team partner Máximo Sexy, forcing Máximo to be shaved bald afterwards per lucha libre traditions. The show featured three Six-man "Lucha Libre rules" tag team match and a tag team match.

== Production ==
=== Background ===
Since 1996 the Mexican wrestling company Consejo Mundial de Lucha Libre (Spanish for "World Wrestling Council"; CMLL) has held a show in March each year to commemorate the passing of CMLL founder Salvador Lutteroth who died in March 1987. For the first three years the show paid homage to Lutteroth himself, from 1999 through 2004 the show paid homage to Lutteroth and El Santo, Mexico's most famous wrestler ever and from 2005 forward the show has paid homage to Lutteroth and a different leyenda ("Legend") each year, celebrating the career and accomplishments of past CMLL stars. Originally billed as Homenaje a Salvador Lutteroth, it has been held under the Homenaje a Dos Leyendas ("Homage to two legends") since 1999 and is the only show outside of CMLL's Anniversary shows that CMLL has presented every year since its inception. All Homenaje a Dos Leyendas shows have been held in Arena México in Mexico City, Mexico, which is CMLL's main venue, its "home". Traditionally CMLL holds their major events on Friday Nights, which means the Homenaje a Dos Leyendas shows replace their regularly scheduled Super Viernes show. The 2016 show will be the 21st overall Homenaje a Dos Leyendas show.

=== Storylines ===
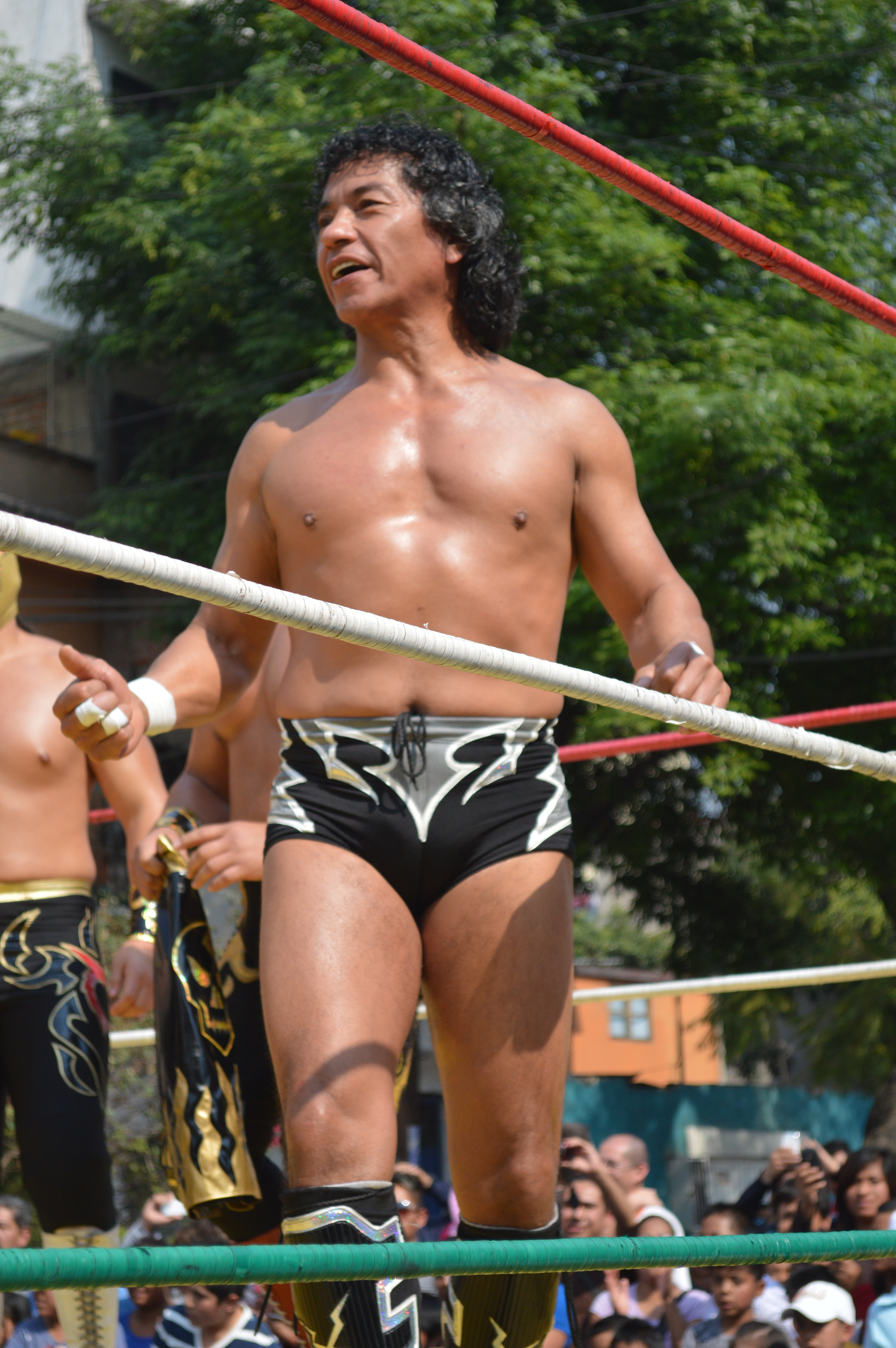
Negro Casas, who lost his hair in the main event

The Homenaje a Dos Leyendas show featured six professional wrestling matches with different wrestlers involved in pre-existing scripted feuds, plots and storylines. Wrestlers were portrayed as either heels (referred to as rudos in Mexico, those that portray the "bad guys") or faces (técnicos in Mexico, the "good guy" characters) as they followed a series of tension-building events, which culminated in a wrestling match or series of matches.

On September 11, 2015, Ramón Ibarra Banda, better known as Super Parka returned to CMLL after an almost eight-year absence to team with his son Volador Jr. A couple of months later Super Parka began working a storyline feud against Negro Casas, one of CMLL's resident veteran rudos. The story line eventually led to the two captaining a team of three, facing off during the 2015 Infierno en el Ring. Super Parka teamed with Máximo Sexy and Valiente while Casas teamed up with Kamaitachi and Bárbaro Cavernario. After Super Parka's team won the match both Super Parka and Casas laid out a Lucha de Apuestas challenge, daring each other to put their hair on the line for a special "bet match" between the two. Moments later CMLL officials came to the ring to sign the contract for the following week's Sin Piedad ("No Mercy") show. Casas defeated Super Parka, forcing Super Parka to have all his hair shaved off as a result. Casas' nephew Puma helped his uncle win the match, much to the displeasure of Volador Jr. who was in his father's corner. Volador Jr. vowed to get revenge for what he described as the Casas family's cheating ways. The first time Volador Jr. faced off against Negro Casas after Sin Pieda Puma and his brother Tiger interfered in the match, helping their uncle win the match. The story line between Volador Jr. and Negro Casas led to Volador Jr. defending the NWA World Historic Welterweight Championship against Negro Casas on February 15, 2016. On February 24 CMLL held a press conference where Volador Jr. and Negro Casas both agreed to put their hair on the line in a Lucha de Apuestas match, officially announcing the main event of the 2016 Homenaje a Dos Leyendas show.

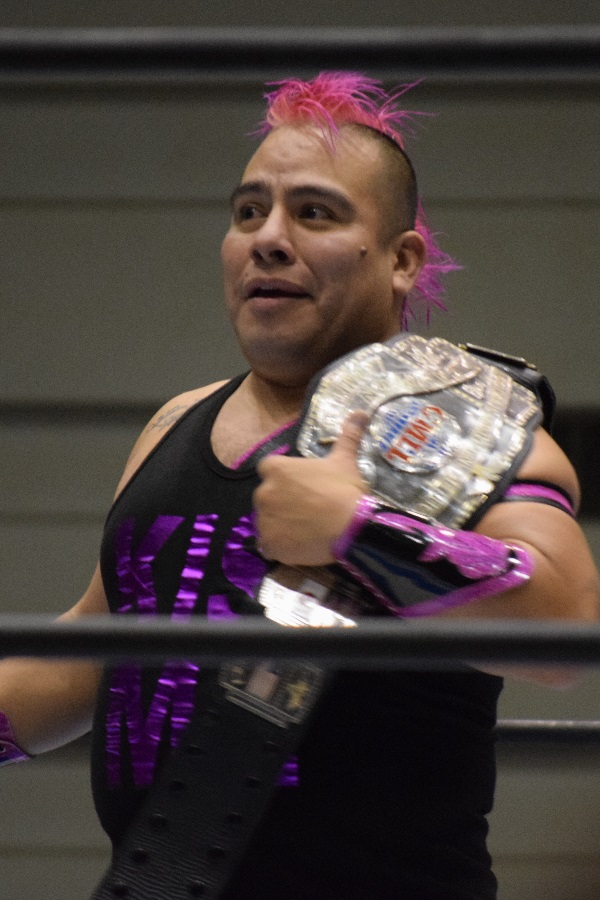
Máximo Sexy who lost his hair at the 2016 Dos Leyendas show.

In 2011 Rush, Marco Corleone and Máximo formed the trio El Bufete del Amor ("The Law of Love"), defeating Los Hijos del Averno (Averno, Mephisto and Ephesto) to win the CMLL World Trios Championship. In May 2014 Marco Corleone suffered a knee injury, which forced the team to relinquish the trios championship. During the summer of 2015 Rush had begun teaming regularly with La Sombra and La Máscara to form a team called Los Ingobernables ("The Unruly"). With Corleone's injury and Rush teaming with Sombra and La Máscara on a regular basis El Bufete was disbanded. In the winter of 2014 Rush broke his leg during a match, which led CMLL to replace him with Marco Corleone for all Ingobernables matches. When Rush returned they decided to let Corleone remain with the team, expanding from a trio to a four-man group. In early 2016 Rush began targeting Máximo, now known as Máximo Sexy. During a match on the February 19 CMLL Super Viernes show Corleone protected Máximo Sexy as Rush and La Máscara attacked him repeated. Moments later Rush and La La Máscara attacked Marco Corleone and kicked him out of Los Ingobernables. During the CMLL press conference on February 25 Corleone and Máximo Sexy announced that they would be reforming El Bufete del Amor and would be looking for a third man to complete the trio. During the press conference Máximo Sexy challenged Rush to a Lucha de Apuestas match, which Rush agreed to, signing a contract during the press conference.

=== Homage to Salvador Lutteroth and Lizmark ===
In September 1933 Salvador Lutteroth González founded Empresa Mexicana de Lucha Libre (EMLL), which would later be renamed Consejo Mundial de Lucha Libre. Over time Lutteroth would become responsible for building both Arena Coliseo in Mexico City and Arena Mexico, which became known as "The Cathedral of Lucha Libre". Over time EMLL became the oldest wrestling promotion in the world, with 2018 marking the 85th year of its existence. Lutteroth has often been credited with being the "father of Lucha Libre", introducing the concept of masked wrestlers to Mexico as well as the Luchas de Apuestas match. Lutteroth died on September 5, 1987. EMLL, late CMLL, remained under the ownership and control of the Lutteroth family as first Salvador's son Chavo Lutteroth and later his grandson Paco Alonso took over ownership of the company.

The life and achievements of Salvador Lutteroth is always honored at the annual Homenaje a Dos Leyenda' show and since 1999 CMLL has also honored a second person, a Leyenda of lucha libre, in some ways CMLL's version of their Hall of Fame. For the 2016 show CMLL commemorated the life and career of Juan Baños (December 18, 1950 – December 16, 2015) best known as the masked wrestler Lizmark. Baños made his in-ring debut on March 14, 1976, wearing the blue and silver mask that he would wrestle under for most of his career, and using the name Lizmark, inspired by the German battleship Bismarck. Lizmark quickly became one of the innovators in lucha libre, incorporating flashy, high flying moves into the matches, a style that is common today but in the 1970s was new and exciting. During his 37-year long career Lizmark won the Mexican National Light Heavyweight Championship, CMLL World Tag Team Championship with Atlantis, the CMLL World Trios Championship Atlantis and Mr. Niebla the Mexican National Middleweight Championship on two occasions, the Mexican National Welterweight Championship, the NWA World Light Heavyweight Championship four times, the NWA World Middleweight Championship, the NWA World Welterweight Championship, and the WWA World Light Heavyweight Championship. His sons followed in his footsteps, wrestling as Lizmark Jr. and El Hijo del Lizmark. He was part of the Class of 2001 inducted into the Wrestling Observer Newsletter Hall of Fame.

== Results ==
No.	Results	Stipulations	Times
1	El Cuatrero and Sansón defeated Oro Jr. and Soberano Jr.	Best two-out-of-three falls tag team match	21:05
2	Ángel de Oro, Rey Cometa and Titán defeated Los Hijos del Infierno (Ephesto, Luciferno and Mephisto	Six-man "Lucha Libre rules" tag team match	10:27
3	Dragon Lee, Máscara Dorada, Místico and Valiente defeated La Ola Amarilla (Okumura, Kamaitachi, Fujin and Raijin)	Best two-out-of-three Atómicos "Lucha Libre rules" tag team match	16:38
4	Rush defeated Máximo Sexy	Best two-out-of-three falls Lucha de Apuestas, hair vs. hair match	15:00
5	Atlantis, Marco Corleone and Brazo de Plata defeated Cibernético, Mr. Niebla and Último Guerrero	Six-man "Lucha Libre rules" tag team match	08:06
6	Volador Jr. defeated Negro Casas	Best two-out-of-three falls Lucha de Apuestas, hair vs. hair match	17:14
