= Infierno en el Ring =

Mexican annual professional wrestling show

Infierno en el Ring is the name of an annual professional wrestling super show or pay-per-view (PPV) event held by the Mexican professional wrestling promotion Consejo Mundial de Lucha Libre (CMLL) since 2008. The term Infierno en el Ring is also the "brand name" used by CMLL for a multi-man steel cage match where the last man in the cage is either forced to unmask or have his hair shaved off. Before 2008 the Infierno en el Ring match was the main event of other shows such as the Entre Torre Infernal show in 2000 and the CMLL 74th Anniversary Show in 2007. At least 74 matches have taken place as of the 2026 Sin Salida event, which took place on January 2, 2026.

== Match type ==
The Infierno en el Ring match is a steel cage match where all the competitors are locked in the cage during the match. After a certain time interval, between three and eight minutes traditionally, the wrestlers are allowed to escape the cage by climbing over the top and to the floor. The last two wrestlers remaining in the cage then wrestled against each other under Lucha de Apuestas (bet match) rules inside the steel cage. Whoever loses the match is forced to either unmask or have their hair shaved off per Lucha Libre traditions.

== History ==
The very first Infierno en el Ring was actually promoted as Torre Infernal, Spanish for "Infernal Tower" and was the main event of CMLL's Entre Torre Infernal ("In the Infernal Tower") pay-per-view (PPV) and featured four wrestlers who all put their hair on the line in the match. Máscara Año 2000 lost when Perro Aguayo pinned him. Subsequently, CMLL began promoting all multi-man Steel cage matches that had Lucha de Apuesta (bet match) rules as Infierno en el Ring. CMLL would use the Infierno en el Ring concept the following year as the main event of the CMLL 69th Anniversary Show where 7 wrestlers risked either their hair or their mask on the outcome of the match. In addition the winning side would earn the rights to the name Los Infernales as well. So far the match at the 69th Anniversary Show is the only match to feature a mixture of hair or masks being bet as well as an additional stipulation. In the end El Satánico pinned Máscara Mágica, forcing him to unmask as well as earning his team the rights to be known as Los Infernales.

The next Infierno en el Ring match took place three years after the Anniversary event, on July 18, 2004 and featured six unmasked, main event level wrestlers risking their hair. The finals came down to Perro Aguayo Jr. and his mentor Negro Casas and saw Aguayo Jr. betray Casas, leaving his mentor to have his hair shaved off after the match. This turn was the catalyst to Perro Aguayo Jr. forming the Perros del Mal stable. CMLL repeated the event the following year on June 17 as the main event of a CMLL Super Viernes show. The match featured 9 men in total as the storyline between Los Perros del Mal and other CMLL rudos (bad guys) heated up, with CMLL's top fan favorite Místico added to the match. In the end Damián 666 escaped the cage, leaving Máscara Magica to lose his second Infierno en el Ring match and had his hair shaved off.

The 2006 Infierno en el Ring match was the first to carry the stipulation that the last two wrestlers would have to wrestle in a regular match instead of escaping the cage. The match took place on July 14, 2006 and featured only masked wrestlers, mainly mid-card level wrestlers all risking their masks in the match. In the end the young Misterioso II defeated the experienced Pantera to unmask him.

The Infierno en el Ring concept was used instead of the traditional big singles match CMLL usually books for their Anniversary shows as they booked an eight-man Infierno en el Ring match as the main event of the CMLL 74th Anniversary Show in 2007. The main event saw all eight men put their masks on the line in the cage, ending with Blue Panther pinning Lizmark Jr. to win the match. The following year CMLL introduced an event called Infierno en el Ring, dedicating an entire event to the cage match. That year's cage match saw 10 wrestlers risk their hair in the match. The finals saw El Texano Jr. defeat Heavy Metal, costing him all his hair.

CMLL used the Infierno en el Ring eight times during 2009, the most of any year. They started the year off with a special Mini-Estrella match, featuring 13 masked Mini-Estrellas facing off. The finals came down to Pierrothito and Shockercito with Pierrothito taking the victory. CMLL held another Mini-Estrellas only cage match on March 3, 2009 in Puebla, Puebla where Mascarita Dorada defeated Sombrita in the final two That was followed by a match that saw Mini-Estrellas and regular sized competitors mixed together for an Infierno en el Ring on August 18, 2009 where Mini-Estrella Pierrothito pinned regular sized competitor Mr. Ráfaga to become the only man to win two Infierno en el Ring matches. CMLL also held their annual Infierno en el Ring event in 2009, this time a 15-man cage match with everyone putting their hair on the line. The match served as the start of the "Mexico vs. Japan" storyline that ran for the rest of 2009 as New Japan Pro-Wrestling visitor Naito pinned Toscano to take Toscano's hair. The fifth and last Infierno en el Ring match in 2009 took place on October 18, 2009 and featured a mixture of young wrestlers trying to make a name for themselves and experienced mid-card wrestlers with the prime of their careers behind them. The final saw the young rudo (bad guy) Pólvora pin the experienced tecnico (good guy) Tigre Blanco to unmask him.

CMLL held the Infierno en el Ring supercard on June 18, 2010. The match featured 12 wrestlers who put their mask on the line in the match. Like the October, 2009 match this cage match featured a mixture of young wrestlers looking to climb up the ranks of CMLL and experienced mid-card wrestlers. The match was the first time two tecnicos ended up as the finalists and saw Ángel de Oro pin Fabián el Gitano to unmask him

With one exception in 2025, 2016 featured the final regular Infierno en el Ring event to be promoted as such. Subsequently, all Infierno en el Ring matches have taken place on shows going by other names, most commonly the annual New Year's Day Sin Salida event.

So far, twenty-three of the 74 matches have featured every wrestler putting their mask on the line and twenty-four have all risked their hair, with the remaining 27 events featuring mixed bets. Seven of the 74 matches have featured CMLL's Mini-Estrella division, one has mixed minis with lightweights, three featured all female competitors and the rest have featured CMLL's regular male division. The first match had the fewest participants with just four, while two of the 2020s' Sin Salida matches featured 16, the most of any event so far. Ten of the matches are of dubious relevance to CMLL, having taken place in independent arenas that CMLL had leased its talent & branding out to. Of the 30 matches to take place in Guadalajara, 23 have focused exclusively on its insular local roster. Excluding such (Note: In the Guadalajara editions; Jocker is 3-1, Exterminador is 2-1, Frezzer is 1-2, Star Black, Palacio Negro, Esfinge & Ráfaga are all 2-0, El Alteño is 1-1-1, Malefico is 1-1, and Carlo Roggi is 0-2.), thirteen wrestlers have been part of the final two for multiple matches;

- Shockercito has been in the final pair an unmatched 4 times (Note: on official CMLL cards) for a record of 2-2, having lost both his mask & then his hair
- brothers Brazo de Oro (Note: at least one of these matches took place on a co-promoted/sponsored event) & Brazo de Platino (Note: all of Platino's losses have been at sponsored shows) have both individually lost 0-4
- Shocker is undefeated at 3-0
- Pierrothito & Princesa Blanca are both undefeated at 2-0
- Negro Casas's record is 1-2
- Máscara Magica has lost both of his finals at 0-2
- Satánico, Máscara Año 2000 & Cesar Dantes are level at 1-1
- Rey Bucanero & El Felino are also 1-1, but with the unique distinction of being the same final pair twice and trading the win

== Dates, venues and results ==
Event	Date	City	Venue	Participants	Outcome
Entre Torre Infernal	August 4, 2000	Mexico City, Mexico	Arena Mexico	4	Máscara Año 2000 had his hair shaved off by Villano III as he was the last man in the cage.
CMLL 68th Anniversary Show	September 28, 2001	Mexico City, Mexico	Arena Mexico	7	Máscara Mágica was unmasked by Satanico as he was the last man in the cage.
CMLL Domingos De Coliseo	June 16, 2002	Mexico City, Mexico	Arena Coliseo	8	Solar II was unmasked by Super Kendo.
co-promoted event	April 16, 2003	Tlalnepantla, Mexico	Arena Lopez Mateos	6	Brazo de Oro had his hair shaved off after losing to Nitro.
co-promoted event	June 20, 2003	Madero, Tamaulipas	Centro de Convenciones de Madero	6	Yankee Star was unmasked by Rayo de Jalisco Jr..
CMLL Domingos De Coliseo	November 30, 2003	Mexico City, Mexico	Arena Coliseo	4	Satánico had his hair shaved off after losing to Máscara Año 2000.
CMLL Guadalajara Domingos	March 21, 2004	Guadalajara, Jalisco	Arena Coliseo de Guadalajara	6	Scorpio Jr. had his hair shaved off after losing to Shocker.
CMLL Domingo	June 18, 2004	Mexico City, Mexico	Arena Mexico	6	Negro Casas had his hair shaved off after losing to Perro Aguayo Jr..
co-promoted event	September 25, 2004	Madero, Tamaulipas	Centro de Convenciones de Madero	6	Bestia Salvaje had his hair shaved off after losing to Shocker.
co-promoted event	November 20, 2004	Acapulco, Guerrero	Auditorio Teotihuacan, Centro de Convenciones	6	Brazo de Oro had his hair shaved off after losing to Villano IV.
CMLL Domingos De Coliseo	December 5, 2004	Mexico City, Mexico	Arena Coliseo	4	Okumura had his hair shaved off after losing to Negro Casas.
co-promoted event	December 18, 2004	Toluca, Mexico	???	6	Brazo de Platino had his hair shaved off after losing. (Note: winner unknown; other participants were Brazo de Oro, Brazo de Plata, Villano III, Villano IV & Villano V.)
CMLL Super Viernes	June 17, 2005	Mexico City, Mexico	Arena Mexico	9	Máscara Mágica had his hair shaved off after losing to Damián 666.
co-promoted event	December 10, 2005	Guadalajara, Jalisco	Feria Zapopum	8	Cesar Dantes had his hair shaved off after losing to Máximo.
CMLL Super Viernes	July 14, 2006	Mexico City, Mexico	Arena Mexico	12	Pantera was unmasked by Misterioso II.
CMLL	July 16, 2006	Guadalajara, Jalisco	Arena Coliseo de Guadalajara	6	Brazo de Oro had his hair shaved off after losing to Cesar Dantes.
CMLL	December 25, 2006	Guadalajara, Jalisco	Arena Coliseo de Guadalajara	8	Golden was unmasked by Infierno.
co-promoted event	April 22, 2007	Monterrey, Nuevo Leon	Arena Solidaridad	11	Enrique Aguilera and Ramiro Ramirez had their hair shaved off.
CMLL 74th Anniversary Show	September 28, 2007	Mexico City, Mexico	Arena Mexico	8	Lizmark Jr. was unmasked by Blue Panther.
CMLL Guadalajara Domingos	December 16, 2007	Guadalajara, Jalisco	Arena Coliseo de Guadalajara	8	Brazo de Oro had his hair shaved off after losing to Exterminador.
CMLL Guadalajara Martes	February 19, 2008	Guadalajara, Jalisco	Arena Coliseo de Guadalajara	8	Tony Rivera had his hair shaved off after losing to Malefico.
Infierno en el Ring (2008)	June 13, 2008	Mexico City, Mexico	Arena Mexico	10	Heavy Metal had his hair shaved off after losing to El Texano Jr..
co-promoted event	July 16, 2008	Madero, Tamaulipas	Centro de Convenciones de Madero	10	Brazo de Platino had his hair shaved off after losing to Oro Nergro.
La Hora Cero	January 11, 2009	Mexico City, Mexico	Arena Mexico	13	Shockercito was unmasked by Pierrothito.
CMLL Guadalajara Viernes	February 6, 2009	Guadalajara, Jalisco	Arena Coliseo de Guadalajara	11	La Medusa had her hair shaved off after losing to Princesa Blanca.
CMLL en Arena Puebla	March 6, 2009	Puebla, Puebla	Arena Puebla	14	Sombrita was unmasked by Mascarita Dorada.
CMLL Guadalajara Domingos	July 19, 2009	Guadalajara, Jalisco	Arena Coliseo de Guadalajara	8	Azazel was unmasked by Palacio Negro.
Infierno en el Ring (2009)	July 31, 2009	Mexico City, Mexico	Arena Mexico	15	Toscano had his hair shaved off after losing to Naito.
CMLL Guadalajara Domingos	August 14, 2009	Guadalajara, Jalisco	Arena Coliseo de Guadalajara	15	Mr. Ráfaga was unmasked by Pierrothito.
CMLL Domingos Arena Mexico	October 18, 2009	Mexico City, Mexico	Arena Mexico	12	Tigre Blanco was unmasked by Pólvora.
CMLL Guadalajara Domingos	November 15, 2009	Guadalajara, Jalisco	Arena Coliseo de Guadalajara	8	El Egipcio was unmasked by El Gallo.
CMLL Guadalajara Domingos	April 25, 2010	Guadalajara, Jalisco	Arena Coliseo de Guadalajara	8	Guerrero Samurai II was unmasked by Ráfaga.
Infierno en el Ring (2010)	July 18, 2010	Mexico City, Mexico	Arena Mexico	12	Fabián el Gitano was unmasked by Ángel de Oro.
CMLL 77th Anniversary Show	September 3, 2010	Mexico City, Mexico	Arena Mexico	10	Olímpico was unmasked by La Sombra.
co-promoted event	November 19, 2010	Chilpancingo, Guerrero	Plaza de Toros Belisario Arteaga	10	Brazo de Platino had his hair shaved off after losing to Apolo Estrada Jr..
CMLL 78th Anniversary Show	September 30, 2011	Mexico City, Mexico	Arena Mexico	10	Rey Bucanero had his hair shaved off after losing to El Felino.
CMLL Guadalajara Viernes	September 30, 2011	Guadalajara, Jalisco	Arena Coliseo de Guadalajara	14	Loco Max had his hair shaved off after losing to Palacio Negro.
co-promoted event	March 3, 2012	Nezahualcoyotl, Mexico	Arena Neza	6	Brazo de Platino had his hair shaved off after losing to Ray Mendoza, Jr..
CMLL Puebla TV	May 28, 2012	Puebla, Puebla	Arena Puebla	12	Karissma was unmasked by Puma King.
Infierno en el Ring (2012)	June 29, 2012	Mexico City, Mexico	Arena Mexico	10	Goya Kong was unmasked by Princesa Blanca.
CMLL Guadalajara Domingos	September 9, 2012	Guadalajara, Jalisco	Arena Coliseo de Guadalajara	8	In Memoriam was unmasked by Esfinge.
CMLL Guadalajara TV	November 6, 2012	Guadalajara, Jalisco	Arena Coliseo de Guadalajara	12	Pequeño Warrior had his hair shaved off after losing to Shockercito.
Sin Salida (2013)	June 2, 2013	Mexico City, Mexico	Arena Mexico	10	Pequeño Violencia had his hair shaved off after losing to Shockercito.
Arena Puebla 60th Anniversary	July 15, 2013	Puebla, Puebla	Arena Puebla	10	Leono had his hair shaved off after losing to Espíritu Maligno.
Infierno en el Ring (2013)	July 19, 2013	Mexico City, Mexico	Arena Mexico	10	Mr. Águila had his hair shaved off after losing to Shocker.
Arena Coliseo 71st Anniversary Show	April 6, 2014	Mexico City, Mexico	Arena Coliseo	10	Pequeño Halcón was unmasked by Astral.
CMLL Guadalajara Domingos	June 22, 2014	Guadalajara, Jalisco	Arena Coliseo de Guadalajara	8	Black Metal was unmasked by Bárbaro Cavernario.
Infierno en el Ring (2014)	December 5, 2014	Mexico City, Mexico	Arena Mexico	10	El Felino had his hair shaved off after losing to Rey Bucanero.
CMLL Guadalajara Viernes	March 27, 2015	Guadalajara, Jalisco	Arena Coliseo de Guadalajara	8	Sadico had his hair shaved off after losing to Jocker (formerly In Memoriam).
CMLL Guadalajara Domingos	June 14, 2015	Guadalajara, Jalisco	Arena Coliseo de Guadalajara	12	Espectrum was unmasked by Esfinge.
Infierno en el Ring (2015)	December 25, 2015	Mexico City, Mexico	Arena Mexico	12	Super Comando was unmasked by The Panther.
CMLL Guadalajara Domingos	December 27, 2015	Guadalajara, Jalisco	Arena Coliseo de Guadalajara	10	Mr. Apolo & El Alteño went to a draw, so both had their hair shaved off.
CMLL Guerreros del Ring	December 28, 2015	Puebla, Puebla	Arena Puebla	10	Police Man had his hair shaved off after losing to Stigma.
CMLL Guadalajara Domingos	June 26, 2016	Guadalajara, Jalisco	Arena Coliseo de Guadalajara	10	El Gitano was unmasked by Star Black.
Infierno en el Ring (2016)	December 25, 2016	Mexico City, Mexico	Arena Mexico	10	La Vaquerita was unmasked by Zeuxis.
CMLL Guadalajara Domingos	December 25, 2016	Guadalajara, Jalisco	Arena Coliseo de Guadalajara	10	Frezzer was unmasked by Star Black.
CMLL Guadalajara Domingos	June 25, 2017	Guadalajara, Jalisco	Arena Coliseo de Guadalajara	10	Guerrero de la Muerte was unmasked by Gran Kenut.
Sin Salida (2017)	December 25, 2017	Mexico City, Mexico	Arena Mexico	10	Hijo del Signo was unmasked by Starman.
CMLL	December 29, 2017	Guadalajara, Jalisco	Arena Coliseo de Guadalajara	10	El Alteño had his hair shaved off after losing to Frezzer.
CMLL Guadalajara Domingos	April 29, 2018	Guadalajara, Jalisco	Arena Coliseo de Guadalajara	10	Carlo Roggi had his hair shaved off after losing to El Alteño.
CMLL Guadalajara Domingos	November 4, 2018	Guadalajara, Jalisco	Arena Coliseo de Guadalajara	10	Destructor was unmasked by Avispón Negro Jr..
CMLL Guadalajara Domingos	August 11, 2019	Guadalajara, Jalisco	Arena Coliseo de Guadalajara	10	El Chakal had his hair shaved off after losing to Paymon.
CMLL 86th Anniversary Show	September 27, 2019	Mexico City, Mexico	Arena Mexico	7	Negro Casas had his hair shaved off after losing to Último Guerrero.
CMLL Guadalajara Domingos	December 1, 2019	Guadalajara, Jalisco	Arena Coliseo de Guadalajara	8	Frezzer had his hair shaved off after losing to Jocker.
CMLL Guadalajara Domingos	February 16, 2020	Guadalajara, Jalisco	Arena Coliseo de Guadalajara	10	Paladin was unmasked by Demonio Maya.
CMLL Martes De Glamour	December 14, 2021	Guadalajara, Jalisco	Arena Coliseo de Guadalajara	8	Carlo Roggi had his hair shaved off after losing to Jocker.
Sin Salida (2022)	January 1, 2022	Mexico City, Mexico	Arena Mexico	11	Disturbio had his hair shaved off after losing to Dulce Gardenia.
Sin Salida (2023)	January 1, 2023	Mexico City, Mexico	Arena Mexico	12	Apocalipsis was unmasked by Valiente Jr..
CMLL Viernes De Locura	December 29, 2023	Guadalajara, Jalisco	Arena Coliseo de Guadalajara	13	Black Boy was unmasked by Exterminador.
Sin Salida (2024)	January 1, 2024	Mexico City, Mexico	Arena Mexico	16	Shockercito had his hair shaved off after losing to Mercurio.
Sin Salida (2025)	January 1, 2025	Mexico City, Mexico	Arena Mexico	12	Kaligua was unmasked by Full Metal.
Infierno en el Ring (2025)	January 3, 2025	Guadalajara, Jalisco	Arena Coliseo de Guadalajara	12	Exterminador had his hair shaved off after losing to Malefico.
Arena Coliseo Guadalajara 66th Anniversary	June 24, 2025	Guadalajara, Jalisco	Arena Coliseo de Guadalajara	8	Mr. Trueno & Rey Trueno were unmasked by Ráfaga & Gallero.
Sin Salida (2026)	January 2, 2026	Mexico City, Mexico	Arena Mexico	16	Robin was unmasked by Calavera Jr. I.

== Also known as ==
CMLL is not the only Mexican wrestling promotion to promote multi-man steel cage matches under Lucha de Apuesta rules. In Asistencia Asesoría y Administración (AAA) such a match is referred to as Domo de la Muete ("Dome of Death") and in International Wrestling Revolution Group (IWRG) they promote an annual Castillo del Terror ("Castle of Terror") with similar rules.
