= Sin Piedad (2016) =

Mexican professional wrestling supercard show

- Official poster for the event depicting all four men risking their hair at the event.
- Promotion: Consejo Mundial de Lucha Libre
- Date: January 1, 2016
- City: Mexico City, Mexico
- Venue: Arena México

Pay-per-view chronology
← Previous; Infierno en el Ring	Next → La Copa Junior

Sin Piedad chronology
← Previous; 2012	Next → 2017

Sin Piedad (2016) (Spanish for "No Mercy") was an internet professional wrestling pay-per-view (iPPV) event produced by the Mexican Lucha Libre promotion Consejo Mundial de Lucha Libre (CMLL), which took place on January 1, 2016 in Arena México, Mexico City, Mexico. The show replaced CMLL's regular Friday night show Super Viernes ("Super Friday"). The 2016 Sin Piedad was the twelfth event under that name that CMLL has promoted, the first one to be held on New Year's Day.

The original main event match between Thunder and Último Guerrero was changed eight days before the show. The main event was replaced with two Luchas de Apuestas, or bet matches, each with the competitors risking their hair. The first of the two Apuestas matches saw Máximo Sexy face off against Kamaitachi and the second match featured lucha libre veterans Negro Casas and Super Parka.

== Production ==
=== Background ===
The Mexican wrestling company Consejo Mundial de Lucha Libre (Spanish for "World Wrestling Council"; CMLL) has held a number of major shows over the years using the moniker Sin Piedad ("No Pity" or "No Mercy"). CMLL has intermittently held a show billed specifically as Sin Piedad since 2000, primarily using the name for their "end of the year" show in December, although once they held a Sin Piedad show in August as well. CMLL has on occasion used a different name for the end-of-year show but Sin Piedad is the most commonly used name. All Sin Piedad shows have been held in Arena México in Mexico City, Mexico which is CMLL's main venue, its "home". The 2016 Sin Piedad will be the first show to be held on New Year's Day and the first time CMLL has promoted a "name" show on that day, previously having promoted whatever regular house shows they happened to have on that day.

Starting in 2011 through 2014 CMLL has been promoting a New Year's Day show with bigger, more prominent and promoted matches as part of the show although they did not specifically promote the shows under a special name, they were simply a special version of their weekly Saturday, Sunday, Tuesday and Wednesday shows that they hold in Arena Mexico on a regular basis. Starting in 2011 CMLL added at least one high profile match to their shows, slowly building them into a special event. in 2011 the show featured the annual Reyes del Aire ("Kings of the Air") tournament, won by Ángel de Oro. In 2012 the January 1 show saw Hombre Bala Jr. and Super Halcón Jr. defeated the team known as Los Rayos Tapatío in a Luchas de Apuestas, masks vs masks match in what turned out to be Los Rayos last match in CMLL. The main event of the 2012 was the finals of a tournament for the vacant CMLL World Heavyweight Championship which was El Terrible defeat Rush 17th heavyweight champion. The 2013 start of the year show was highlighted first by then CMLL World Welterweight Champion Pólvora successfully defending against Titán and then the team of Boby Zavala and Disturbio defeated Leono and Tigre Blanco, forcing Leono and Blanco to have their hair shaved off as a result. The 2014 show, the last January 1 show without a specific title saw Super Halcón Jr. win that year's La Copa Junior tournament. Late in the show Mephisto defeated Atlantis to retain the Mexican National Light Heavyweight Championship in the main event. CMLL did not hold a show on January 1, 2015.

=== Storylines ===
The event featured six professional wrestling matches with different wrestlers involved in pre-existing scripted feuds, plots and storylines. Wrestlers were portrayed as either heels (referred to as rudos in Mexico, those that portray the "bad guys") or faces (técnicos in Mexico, the "good guy" characters) as they followed a series of tension-building events, which culminated in a wrestling match or series of matches.

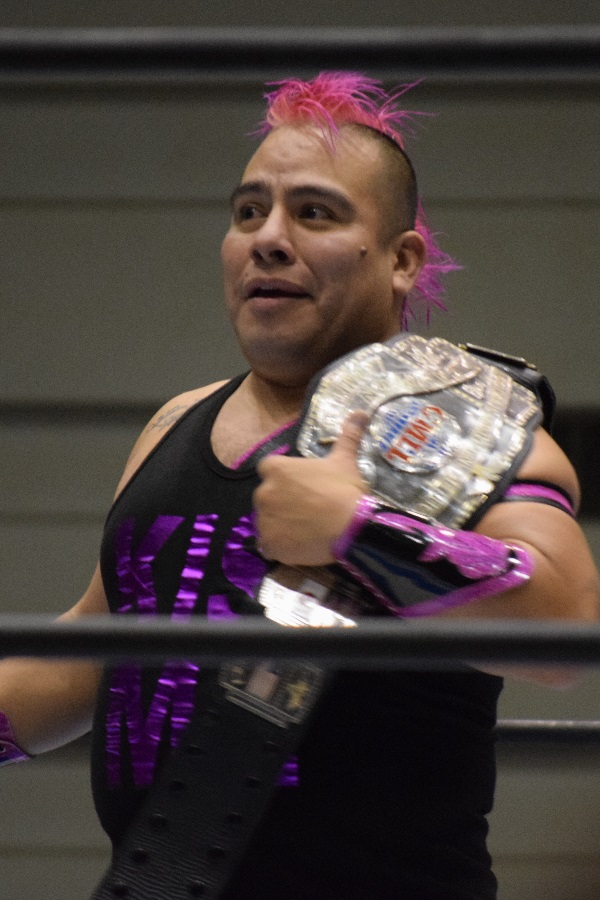
Máximo Sexy, risked his hair at the Sin Piedad show against Kamaitachi

For years CMLL has had a working agreement with Japanese promotion New Japan Pro-Wrestling (NJPW), which has included NJPW sending one or more young wrestlers to Mexico to gain further experience as part of their training. Since 2009 one or more NJPW rookies has stayed with CMLL for an extended period of time, with Hiromu Takahashi travelling to Mexico in early 2014. He was given a wrestling mask and the ring name Kamaitachi, making him part of La Fievre Amarilla ("The Yellow Fever") along with Okumura, a long time CMLL rudo. Over the almost two years Kamaitachi competed for CMLL he developed a long running storyline rivalry with Dragon Lee, with the Dragon Lee taking Kamatachi's mask in a Luchas de Apuestas match at the 2015 Homenaje a Dos Leyendas show. On December 4, 2015 Kamaitachi appeared to have defeated Dragon Lee to win the CMLL World Lightweight Championship when he pinned Dragon Lee, but Lee's corner man Máximo Sexy pointed out that Lee had his foot on the ropes and the match was restarted. Moments later Dragon Lee won the match, promoting Kamaitachi to attack Máximo Sexy, with the storyline being that Kamaitachi was angry that Máximo cost him the title. In subsequent weeks Kamaitachi and Máximo Sexy were on opposite sides of six-man tag team matches, furthering the rivalry between the two. During the 2015 Infierno en el Ring show CMLL officials held an in ring contract signing between Kamaitachi and Máximo Sexy for a Lucha de Apuestas match between the two for the following week's Sin Piedad show. In the week leading up to the Sin Piedad show it was revealed that Máximo Sexy had suffered a knee injury, but would work through it for the Sin Piedad show, it is unclear if the knee injury was part of the storyline or a legitimate injury suffered by Máximo Sexy.

== Results ==
No.	Results	Stipulations	Times
1	La Amapola, Dalys and Zeuxis defeated Estrellita, La Vaquerita and Princesa Sujei	Best two-out-of-three falls six-woman "Lucha Libre rules" tag team match	09:47
2	Los Cancerberos del Infierno (Cancerbero, Raziel and Virus) defeated Blue Panther Jr., Esfinge and The Panther	Best two-out-of-three falls six-man "Lucha Libre rules" tag team match	13:43
3	Los Revolucionarios del Terror (Dragón Rojo Jr., Pólvora and Thunder) defeated Atlantis, Marco Corleone and Valiente	Best two-out-of-three falls six-man "Lucha Libre rules" tag team match	10:56
4	Máximo Sexy (with Hombre Bala Jr.) defeated Kamaitachi (with Okumura)	Best two-out-of-three falls Lucha de Apuestas, hair vs. hair match	23:22
5	Cibernético, Último Guerrero, and Volador Jr. defeated Carístico, Místico and Rush	Best two-out-of-three falls six-man, Relevos Increíbles tag team match	09:57
6	Negro Casas (with Puma) defeated Super Parka (with Volador Jr.)	Best two-out-of-three falls Lucha de Apuestas, hair vs. hair match	12:49

== See also ==
- 2016 in professional wrestling
