= Sanely =

Professional wrestler

Personal information
- Born: Unrevealed (Note: Traditionally Mexican sources will not report on the birth name of a masked wrestler who has never been unmasked in the ring.); 1981 (age 44–45) Torreón, Coahuila, Mexico
- Parent: Mano Negra (father)
- Relatives: El Rebelde (grandfather); Mano Negra Jr. (brother); Black Warrior (brother-in-law)
- Website: Facebook page

Professional wrestling career
- Ring names: Sanely; Zanely; Zanelli
- Billed height: 65 kg
- Trained by: Black Warrior; Arturo Beristain; Shocker; Último Guerrero
- Debut: December 25, 2015

Sanely (born in 1981) is a Mexican professional wrestler. She is working for Consejo Mundial de Lucha Libre (CMLL) as a tecnica (those that portray the "good guys" in professional wrestling) and is a former Mexican National Women's Champion. Outside of her wrestling career Sanely is a trained Psychologist and a physical fitness trainer.

She is a second-generation professional wrestler, the daughter of Jesús Reza Rosales, better known as Mano Negra, the sister of Mano Negra Jr. and the sister-in-law of Black Warrior. Her mask and her black and blue wrestling gear color scheme is based on her father's mask.

== Personal life ==
Sanely was born in 1991, in Torreón, Coahuila, Mexico. She is the daughter of Jesús Reza Rosales, better known as professional wrestler Mano Negra. and granddaughter of Jesús Reza García, known as "El Rebelde". Her brother is known as Mano Negra Jr. and her brother-in-law is best known under the ring name Black Warrior.

Growing up Sanely and her brother would often play around in the wrestling ring prior to shows with the children of El Felino, Mocho Cota, Kung Fu, Kato Kung Lee. When she asked her father to train her he refused, worried about the conditions that female wrestles had to perform under in Mexico at the time. Instead he insisted she got a college degree, which led to her earning a degree in psychology from National Autonomous University of Mexico (Universidad Nacional Autónoma de México; UNAM). In early 2019 it was revealed that Sanely would be participating in a UNAM conference on sports psychology called Anticípada a la Jugada ("Anticipate the games"). She was a special guest for the event, participating in a workshop called "One day after tomorrow: Psychological Aspects of Sports Retreat".

== Professional wrestling career ==
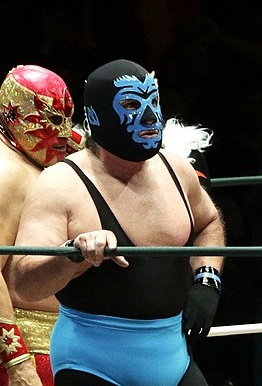
Sanely's father Mano Negra (front), wearing the mask that inspired Sanely's mask and ring gear.

Sanely did not begin to train for a professional wrestling career in mid 2015, training under El Solar initially. Her first in-ring appearance took place in November 2015 as part of Consejo Mundial de Lucha Libre's (CMLL) annual bodybuilding competition under the name "Zanelly". She made her actual in-ring debut on December 25, 2015, teaming with Gema to defeat Pasion Crystal and Reyna Isis on a show in Puebla, After working on the independent circuit for about six months, Zanelly, now billed as "Sanely", made her CMLL debut on July 25, 2016. Sanely and Lluvia defeated the CMLL World Women's Champion Dalys la Caribeña and the Mexican National Women's Champion Zeuxis. Starting with CMLL full time also meant that she began training at the CMLL wrestling school full time, under Arturo Beristain, Shocker and Último Guerrero SJe quickly earned the nickname "La Dama del Guante Negro" ("The Lady of the Black Glove") due to wearing a long black glove in homage to her father.

On December 25, 2016, Sanely was one of ten women who put their mask on the line in a Lucha de Apuestas ("Bet match") steel cage match, the main event of CMLL's 2016 Infierno en el Ring event. Sanely escaped the ring to keep her mask safe as the match ended with Zeuxis pinning La Vaquerita to unmask her. CMLL hed the La Copa NAtalia Vazquez in July 2017, a 14-woman torneo cibernetico elimination match to honor one of the founders of women's wrestling in Mexico. Sanely was the third wrestler eliminated from the tournament that was won by Princesa Sugehit.

Sanely, and most of the CMLL female roster competed for the recently created RO Wrestling Women's Championship in a one-night tournament held on November 24, 2018. Sanely and Princesa Sugehit outlasted Bastet, Dalys la Caribeña, Lillith Dark and Pequeno Azul to qualify for the finals. In the end Sanely defeated Princesa Sugeith to win the ROW Women's Championship. On February 16, 2019, Sanely successfully defended the ROW Women's Championship against Lluvia and Reina Obscura on a show in Ecatepec, Mexico State.

== Championships and accomplishments ==
- Consejo Mundial de Lucha Libre

- Mexican National Women's Championship (1 time)
- Copa Herederes (2025)
