= Hiromu Takahashi =

Japanese professional wrestler (born 1989)

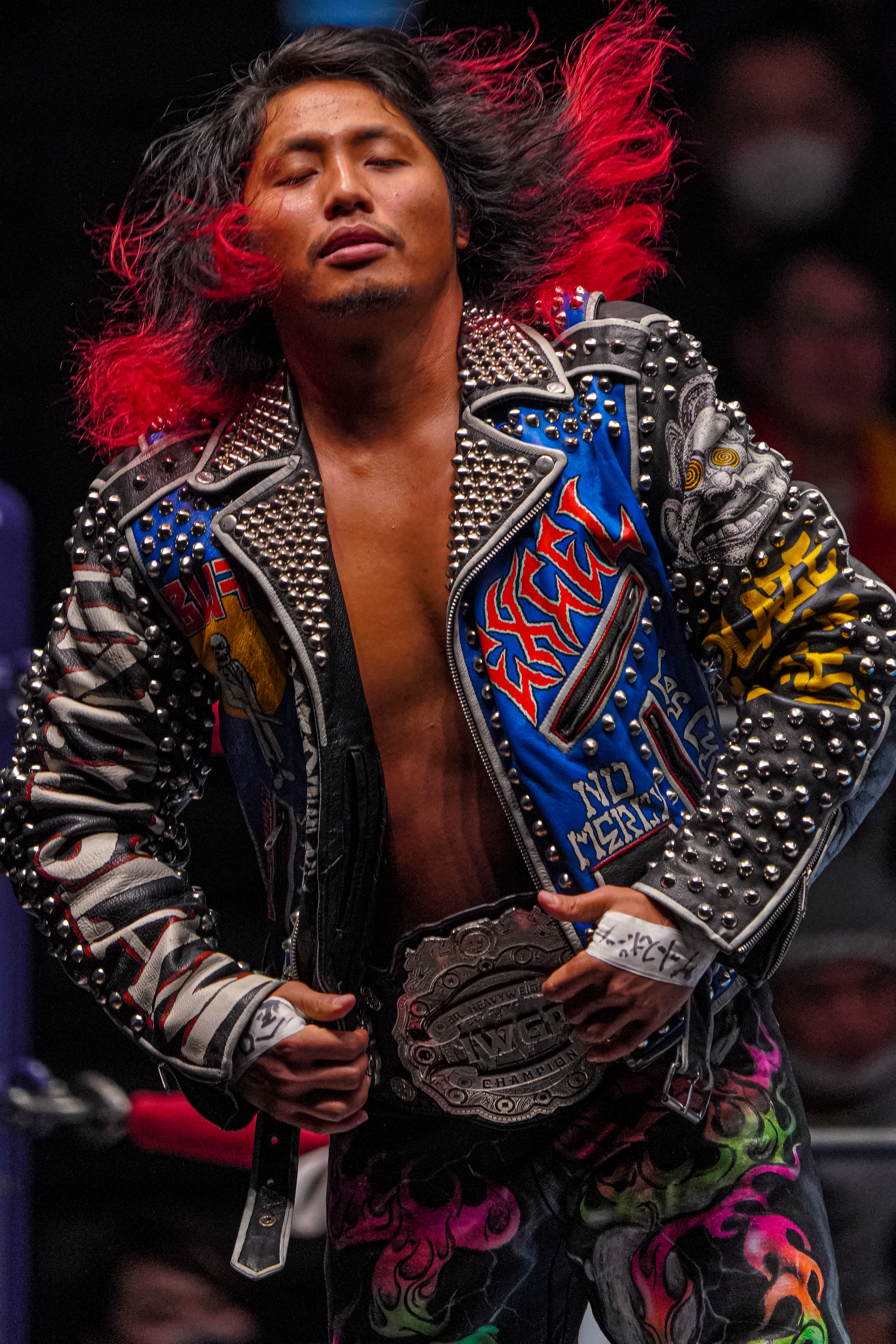
- Takahashi in 2020

Personal information
- Born: December 4, 1989 (age 36) Hachiōji, Tokyo, Japan

Professional wrestling career
- Ring name(s): Hiromu Takahashi; Kamaitachi; Kyoki
- Billed height: 1.71 m (5 ft 7 1/2 in)
- Billed weight: 88 kg (194 lb)
- Trained by: NJPW Dojo; Tetsuya Naito; Jado; Hiroyoshi Tenzan
- Debut: August 24, 2010

Hiromu Takahashi (高橋 広夢, Takahashi Hiromu; ring name: 高橋 ヒロム) (born December 4, 1989) is a Japanese professional wrestler. He is signed to WWE, where he performs on the SmackDown brand under the ring name Kyoki (狂奇, Kyōki) and is one-half of Bakusai alongside Shinsuke Nakamura. He is best known for his sixteen-year tenure with New Japan Pro-Wrestling (NJPW).

Takahashi made his debut for NJPW on August 28, 2010, and worked as a "Young Lion" for three years. In January 2014, Takahashi, renamed Kamaitachi (カマイタチ, Kamaitachi), was sent to the Mexican Consejo Mundial de Lucha Libre (CMLL) promotion to further his wrestling training and gain international experience, a tradition with NJPW "Young Lions". In January 2016, he won his first professional wrestling championship, the CMLL World Lightweight Championship. After leaving CMLL, he worked for the American promotion Ring of Honor (ROH) until the fall of 2016, with Takahashi returning to NJPW in November, once again working under his real name. Upon his return, Takahashi became a five-time IWGP Junior Heavyweight Champion, a one-time NEVER Openweight 6-Man Tag Team Champion with Yota Tsuji and Bushi, and a record four-time Best of the Super Juniors tournament winner (2018, 2020, 2021, 2022). He also wrestled for All Elite Wrestling (AEW) and Pro Wrestling Noah, where he won the GHC Junior Heavyweight Championship.

He departed NJPW in February 2026 and signed with WWE that August as Kyoki (狂奇, Kyōki).

== Early life ==
Takahashi was born on December 4, 1989, in Hachiōji, a city in Tokyo. At the age of 12, he became a fan of professional wrestling, especially Masahiro Chono, who inspired Takahashi to work hard in school to become a member of the track and field team.

== Professional wrestling career ==
=== New Japan Pro-Wrestling (2010–2026) ===
==== Young Lion and foreign excursion (2010–2016) ====
Takahashi attended New Japan Pro-Wrestling's (NJPW) annual open tryout test in May 2009 and passed, being accepted into the NJPW Dojo. He made his in-ring debut at NEVER.1 on August 24, 2010, losing to Kyosuke Mikami in a short opening match. Takahashi followed the traditions of NJPW's "Young Lions" (their term for rookies), wrestling in all black trunks and boots, usually losing the majority of their matches as part of their ongoing training regimen. He lost every match he competed in until he and Tomoaki Honma defeated King Fale and Mikami on February 6, 2011. His pay-per-view debut was a loss to Tama Tonga at The New Beginning on February 20. Exactly six months after his debut, Takahashi won his first singles match against Dramatic Dream Team (DDT)'s Kazuki Hirata at NEVER.5. On April 7, Takahashi was given an opportunity to compete for a spot in the annual Best of the Super Juniors tournament, participating in the "Road to the Super Juniors" tournament, but lost in the first round to DDT's Keisuke Ishii. Takahashi, Honma and Manabu Nakanishi defeated Gedo, Jado and Killer Rabbit at Wrestling Dontaku 2011 on May 3, followed by a loss to Koji Kanemoto at Dominion 6.18 on June 18. Three days later, Takahashi, Mikami and Takaaki Watanabe lost to Madoka, Shinobu and Tsuyoshi Kikuchi in the first round of the "J Sports Crown Openweight 6 Man Tag Tournament".

In May 2012, Takahashi replaced Black Tiger for the 2012 Best of Super Juniors. He finished the tournament with only two points after seven losses and one win at the end over Taka Michinoku, faling to advance to the semi-finals. At Destruction on September 23, he and Wataru Inoue lost to Laughter7 (Katsuyori Shibata and Kazushi Sakuraba). He participated in a tournament to determine the inaugural NEVER Openweight Champion on November 15, losing to Shiori Asahi in the first round. On January 4, 2013, Takahashi competed in his first January 4 Tokyo Dome Show in a dark match at Wrestle Kingdom 7, teaming with Jushin Thunder Liger and Tiger Mask in a loss to Bushi, Kushida and Ryusuke Taguchi. Four months later, he competed in that year's Best of the Super Juniors, but scored no points after losing all eight of his tournament matches. NJPW often sends their "Young Lions" on a learning excursion outside Japan, and in June, it was announced that Takahashi would travel to the United Kingdom, where he worked regularly for a number of local British independent wrestling promotions.

==== Joining Los Ingobernables de Japón (2016–2019) ====
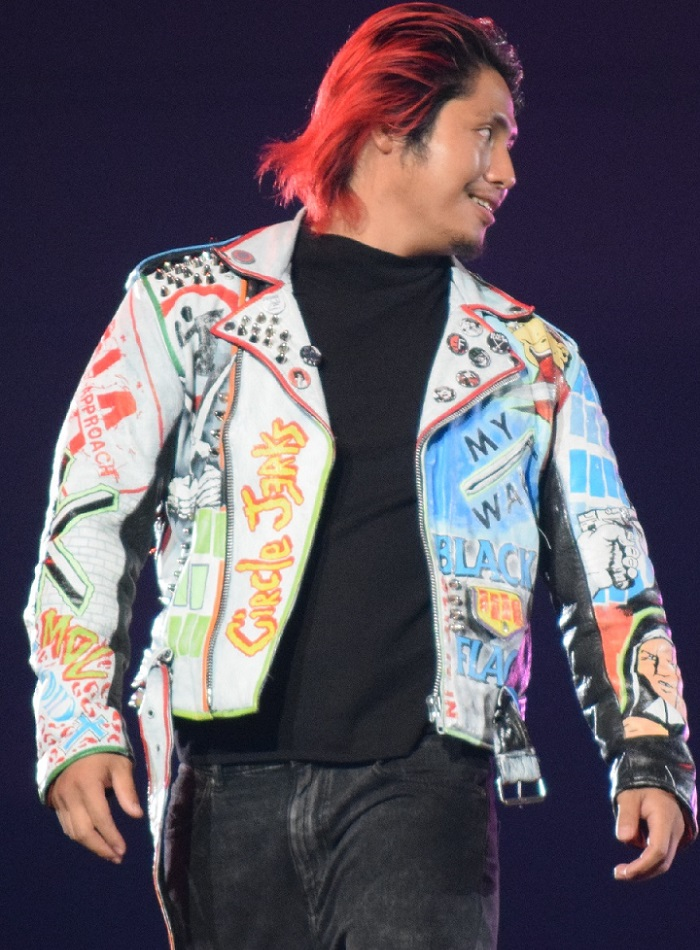
Takahashi returned from excursion at Power Struggle in November 2016, challenging Kushida for the IWGP Junior Heavyweight Championship

In August 2016, a cryptic video started appearing on NJPW programming featuring a time bomb counting down to November 5, 2016, the day of Power Struggle. At the event, Takahashi, under his real name, made a surprise appearance after Kushida defeated Bushi for the IWGP Junior Heavyweight Championship, challenging him to a match at Wrestle Kingdom 11 in Tokyo Dome. On December 10, Takahashi accepted Tetsuya Naito's offer to join the Los Ingobernables de Japón (L.I.J.) stable. At the event on January 4, 2017, Takahashi defeated Kushida to win the title for the first time. He successfully defended the title against longtime rival Dragon Lee at The New Beginning in Osaka on February 11, Taguchi at NJPW's 45th anniversary show on March 6, Kushida at Sakura Genesis 2017 on April 9 (in one minute and 56 seconds), and Ricochet on April 29. Takahashi suffered his first loss since returning on May 17, losing to Lee in his opening match in the 2017 Best of the Super Juniors. He finished the tournament with a record of four wins and three losses, failing to advance to the finals. At Dominion 6.11 in Osaka-jo Hall on June 11, he lost the title back to tournament winner Kushida.

In late 2017, Takahashi started teaming regularly with L.I.J. stablemate Bushi in NJPW's junior tag team division. They entered the 2017 Super Jr. Tag Tournament in October, defeating Lee and Titán in the first round, before being eliminated in the semi-finals by Roppongi 3K (Sho and Yoh). At Wrestle Kingdom 12 on January 4, 2018, he competed in a fatal-four-way match for the title, which was won by Will Ospreay. He unsuccessfully challenged Ospreay for the title on February 10 at The New Beginning in Osaka. Months later, Takahashi competed in the 2018 Best of the Super Juniors, winning his block with five wins and two losses, defeating Kushida to advance to the finals. On June 4, Takahashi defeated Taiji Ishimori to win the tournament. At Dominion 6.9 in Osaka-jo-Hall five days later, Takahashi defeated Ospreay to win his second IWGP Junior Heavyweight Championship. On July 7, at G1 Special in San Francisco, he successfully defended his title against Lee. After the match, it was reported that Takahashi suffered a broken neck due to a botched Phoenix-Plex, which would cause him to miss 9 to 12 months of action due to the severity of the injury. As a result, the title was declared vacant on August 20.

==== Junior division success (2019–2024) ====
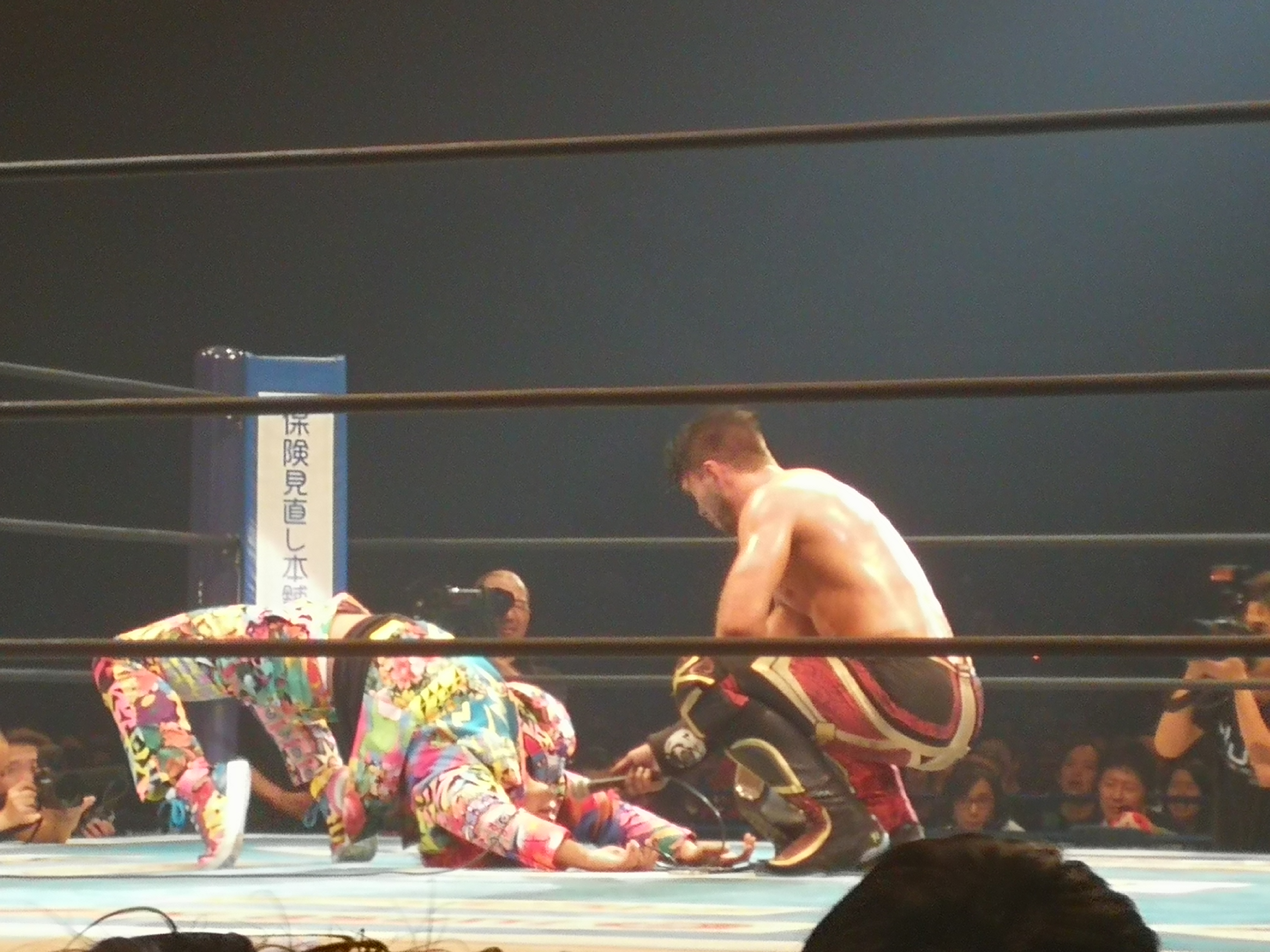
Takahashi (left) returned from a severe neck injury at Power Struggle in November 2019, challenging Will Ospreay (right) for the IWGP Junior Heavyweight Championship

At Power Struggle on November 3, 2019, Takahashi returned from injury, challenging Ospreay for the IWGP Junior Heavyweight Championship at Wrestle Kingdom 14 on January 4, 2020, which he won for the third time in his career. On the second night of the event, Takahashi and Ryu Lee defeated Liger and Naoki Sano in what was Liger's retirement match, with Takahashi pinning Liger. At The New Beginning in Osaka on February 9, he defeated Lee to retain the title. On June 16, Takahashi entered the New Japan Cup, defeating Honma, Toru Yano and Tomohiro Ishii to advance to the semi-finals on July 3, where he lost to Kazuchika Okada. At Sengoku Lord in Nagoya on July 25, Takahashi unsuccessfully challenged Evil for both his IWGP Heavyweight Championship and IWGP Intercontinental Championship. At Summer Struggle in Jingu on August 29, he lost the IWGP Junior Heavyweight Championship to Ishimori, ending his reign at 238 days. On December 11, Takahashi won the 2020 Best of the Super Juniors, defeating El Desperado in the finals.

On Night 1 of Wrestle Kingdom 15 on January 4, 2021, Takahashi defeated Super J-Cup winner El Phantasmo to face Ishimori for the IWGP Junior Heavyweight Championship on Night 2, winning it for the fourth time. However, he vacated the title on February 25, after suffering a torn pectoral muscle in a match the week prior. He returned at Wrestle Grand Slam in Tokyo Dome on July 25, challenging the winner of the IWGP Junior Heavyweight Championship match between El Desperado and Robbie Eagles. On Night 2 of Wrestle Grand Slam in MetLife Dome on September 5, he failed to win the title from the winner, Eagles. On December 15, Takahashi defeated Yoh to win the 2021 Best of the Super Juniors, his third time winning the tournament, becoming the second wrestler to win back-to-back finals after Tiger Mask IV in 2004 and 2005. He lost his title match to El Desperado on Night 1 of Wrestle Kingdom 16 on January 4, 2022. During the New Japan Cup in March, Takahashi defeated Sho, Minoru Suzuki and Evil in the first three rounds, but lost to L.I.J. stablemate Shingo Takagi in the quarterfinals. He failed to win Evil's NEVER Openweight Championship on April 9 at Hyper Battle. On June 3, Takahashi defeated El Desperado in the finals of the 2022 Best of the Super Juniors, winning the tournament for a third consecutive time and becoming the only wrestler to win it four times. He unsuccessfully challenged Ishimori for the IWGP Junior Heavyweight Championship on June 21.

Takahashi in April 2023

On January 4, 2023, at Wrestle Kingdom 17, Takahashi defeated El Desperado, Ishimori and Master Wato in a four-way match to win his fifth IWGP Junior Heavyweight Championship. He successfully defended the title against Yoh on February 5 at The New Beginning in Sapporo, and Eagles on April 8 at Sakura Genesis. Following the main event, Takahashi challenged new IWGP Heavyweight Champion Sanada for his title, which he accepted on the condition that his Just 5 Guys stablemate Yoshinobu Kanemaru challenged for Takahashi's title first. He retained the title against Kanemaru later that month, but failed to win Sanada's title at Wrestling Dontaku 2023 on May 3. At Dominion 6.4 in Osaka-jo Hall on June 4, he retained his title against Wato. At Destruction in Ryōgoku on October 9, Takahashi retained the title in a three-way match against Mike Bailey and Yoh, after which he was attacked by a returning Ishimori. At Power Struggle on November 4, after successfully defending his title against Ishimori, Takahashi challenged El Desperado to a title match at Wrestle Kingdom 18 on January 4, 2024, where he lost the title, ending his reign at 365 days. He lost to Mustafa Ali at Windy City Riot on April 12. The following month, he entered the 2024 Best of the Super Juniors, but failed to advance to the semi-finals with six wins and three losses. At Dominion 6.9 in Osaka-jo Hall on June 9, Takahashi, Bushi and Yota Tsuji defeated Hiroshi Tanahashi, Oleg Boltin and Yano for the NEVER Openweight 6-Man Tag Team Championship, but lost it in a rematch the following week. He then defeated Ali at Capital Collision on August 30.

==== Teaming with Tetsuya Naito and departure (2024–2026) ====
On December 8, Takahashi and L.I.J. stablemate Naito defeated Gabe Kidd and Sanada to win the 2024 World Tag League. Due to the IWGP Tag Team Championship being vacant at the time, they instead decided to face each other in a singles match at Wrestle Kingdom 19 on January 4, 2025, which Naito won. They failed to win the titles in a three-way tag team match the following night at Wrestle Dynasty, which was won by The Young Bucks. At Battle in the Valley on January 11, Takahashi, Mayu Iwatani and Yuka Sakazaki defeated House of Torture (Evil and Sho) and Sumie Sakai in Sakai's retirement match. At The New Beginning in Osaka on February 11, Takahashi and Naito defeated The Young Bucks to win the IWGP Tag Team Championship, but lost it to Callum Newman and Jeff Cobb on April 5 at Sakura Genesis. After Naito's departure and the disbandment of L.I.J., Takahashi, Daiki Nagai, Takagi, Titán and Tsuji formed "Unaffiliated" and aligned with Bullet Club. After Wrestle Kingdom 20, at New Year Dash!! on January 5, David Finlay and Tsuji announced the dissolution of Bullet Club and Unaffiliated, replacing the alliance with Unbound Company, which was a complete merger.

On February 3, 2026, NJPW announced that Takahashi would be leaving the promotion, with his final match taking place on February 11 at The New Beginning in Osaka. At the event, Takahashi and Ishimori defeated Francesco Akira and Jakob Austin Young. After the main event between Tsuji and Jake Lee, Takahashi bid the fans farewell and embraced his Unbound Co. stablemates, officially ending his sixteen-year tenure with NJPW.

=== Consejo Mundial de Lucha Libre (2014–2017) ===
Takahashi traveled to Mexico for his excursion in January 2014 to work with NJPW's partner promotion, Consejo Mundial de Lucha Libre (CMLL). He adopted the masked heel (or rudo) character Kamaitachi, named after a Japanese supernatural monster resembled by his mask, being paired with CMLL's resident Japanese worker Okumura as part of La Fiebre Amarilla ("The Yellow Fever"). On January 31, they teamed with Sangre Azteca to defeat Fuego, Super Halcón Jr. and Tritón in Takahashi's Mexico debut. On July 13, Kamaitachi and Okumura unsuccessfully challenged Delta and Guerrero Maya Jr. for the CMLL Arena Coliseo Tag Team Championship. On December 26, he participated in a torneo cibernetico to determine one of the challengers for the vacant CMLL World Welterweight Championship, but was the sixth wrestler eliminated.

In early 2015, Kamaitachi started a storyline rivalry with Dragon Lee after having faced each other many times the previous year. They were paired for the Torneo Nacional de Parejas Increíbles ("National Incredible Teams Tournament"), in which rivals are forced to team up, but lost in the first round to Mephisto and La Máscara on February 20, after which Kamaitachi stole Lee's mask. The rivalry culminated on March 20 at Homenaje a Dos Leyendas ("Homage to Two Legends"), where Kamaitachi was defeated by Lee in a Lucha de Apuestas ("bet match"). Per stipulation, Kamaitachi unmasked following the loss, revealing himself as Hiromu Takahashi. On May 1 and 15, Kamaitachi respectively participated in the Reyes del Aire ("Kings of the Air") and Leyenda de Plata ("The Silver Legend") tournaments, but failed to win both. Over the following months, Kamaitachi unsuccessfully challenged Lee for the CMLL World Lightweight Championship on four occasions. At Infierno en el Ring ("Inferno in the Ring") on December 25, Kamaitachi, Bárbaro Cavernario and Negro Casas lost to Máximo Sexy, Super Parka and Valiente. The following week, at Sin Piedad ("No Mercy") on January 1, 2016, Kamaitachi lost to Máximo in a hair vs. hair Lucha de Apuestas, forcing him to be shaved bald as a result.

On January 23, Takahashi, billed as Kamaitachi, made a surprise return to NJPW during the CMLL and NJPW co-produced Fantastica Mania 2016 tour, attacking Lee and challenging him to a title match, marking his first NJPW appearance since May 2013. The following day of the tour, Kamaitachi defeated Lee to win his first professional wrestling title, the CMLL World Lightweight Championship. After the match, Kamaitachi stated that he was not yet returning to NJPW, but would travel back to CMLL. On March 4, back in Mexico City, Kamaitachi lost the title back to Lee. At Homenaje a Dos Leyendas on March 18, he, Okumura, Fujin and Raijin lost to Lee, Máscara Dorada, Místico and Valiente. The following month, it was reported that Takahashi was done with CMLL and had moved to the United States. He made a one-night return on November 12, 2017, teaming with Los Ingobernables de Japón stablemate Tetsuya Naito and Rush in a loss to Diamante Azul, Marco Corleone and Volador Jr.

=== Ring of Honor (2016–2018, 2023) ===
Takahashi in 2018

On April 30, 2016, Kamaitachi made his debut for Ring of Honor (ROH), replacing Roderick Strong in his match against A. C. H., but lost. At Best In The World on June 24, he lost to Kyle O'Reilly by submission. Later that night, Kamaitachi formed an alliance with ROH World Tag Team Champions The Addiction (Christopher Daniels and Frankie Kazarian), attacking Jay White at ringside during their title defense. At Death Before Dishonor XIV on August 19, he was part of a fatal four-way match to determine the number one contender for the ROH World Television Championship, which was won by Donovan Dijak. At All Star Extravaganza VIII on September 30, Kamaitachi lost to his old CMLL rival, the debuting Dragon Lee. On October 29, in his last appearance at the time, Kamaitachi and The Addiction lost to Hechicero, Okumura and Último Guerrero in the first round of a tournament to determine the inaugural ROH World Six-Man Tag Team Champions.

Under his real name, Takahashi participated in the ROH/NJPW co-promoted Honor Rising: Japan, War of the Worlds UK and Global Wars tours throughout 2017. At the ROH 16th Anniversary Show on March 9, 2018, he defeated Flip Gordon. On the June 29, 2023 episode of Ring of Honor Wrestling, Takahashi returned to ROH after five years, teaming with Bushi and Shingo Takagi to unsuccessfully challenge Mogul Embassy (Bishop Kaun, Brian Cage and Toa Liona) for the ROH World Six-Man Tag Team Championship.

=== Pro Wrestling Guerrilla (2016) ===
Kamaitachi debuted for Pro Wrestling Guerrilla (PWG) on May 20, 2016, replacing an injured Zack Sabre Jr. in a loss to Michael Elgin. On September 3, he was eliminated by Trevor Lee in the first round of the Battle of Los Angeles tournament.

=== Return to CMLL (2023–2025) ===
On July 26, 2023, it was announced that Takahashi would return to CMLL to compete in that year's International Grand Prix tournament on August 18. He was the last wrestler eliminated by Místico, sparking a feud between the two. Takahashi challenged Místico for the NWA World Historic Middleweight Championship on August 27, but the match ended in a draw after a double pin, thus Místico retained the title. At Fantastica Mania Mexico on June 21, 2024, Takahashi lost to Místico in their rematch. At the following year's edition of Fantastica Mania Mexico on June 20, 2025, Takahashi teamed with Los Ingobernables de Japón stablemates Shingo Takagi and Titán to defeat United Empire (Francesco Akira, TJP and Templario), in what was L.I.J.'s final match as a faction before stablemates Bushi and Tetsuya Naito left NJPW.

=== All Elite Wrestling (2023–2025) ===
Takahashi was scheduled to make his All Elite Wrestling (AEW) debut at Forbidden Door on June 26, 2022, to team with Shingo Takagi, Darby Allin and Sting against El Phantasmo, Hikuleo and The Young Bucks, but was pulled from the card after suffering from a fever. Takahashi debuted for AEW at Forbidden Door on June 25, 2023, teaming with stablemates Bushi and Takagi to defeat United Empire (Jeff Cobb, Kyle Fletcher and TJP) on Zero Hour. He returned on the June 26, 2024 episode of Dynamite, where he, Takagi and Titán fought Blackpool Combat Club (Claudio Castagnoli, Jon Moxley and Wheeler Yuta) to a no contest due to both teams brawling outside of the ring. On August 24, 2025, at Forbidden Door, Takahashi unsuccessfully challenged Fletcher for the AEW TNT Championship.

=== Pro Wrestling Noah (2024–2026) ===
Takahashi made his Pro Wrestling Noah debut at Sunny Voyage on July 28, 2024, teaming with AMAKUSA, Naomichi Marufuji and Takashi Sugiura to defeat All Rebellion (Alejandro, Cristobal, Kaito Kiyomiya and Kenoh). On September 8, 2025, he defeated YO-HEY to win the GHC Junior Heavyweight Championship. At Wrestle Odyssey on October 11, he successfully defended the title against Eita. The following month, he won the 2025 Jr. Grand Prix, defeating Kai Fujimura in the finals. On January 1, 2026, at Noah The New Year 2026, Takahashi lost the GHC Junior Heavyweight Championship to AMAKUSA, ending his reign at 115 days.

=== WWE (2026–present) ===
Takahashi made his WWE debut on the August 21, 2026, episode of SmackDown as Kyoki, where he was revealed as the new tag team partner of Shinsuke Nakamura. He made his televised in-ring debut two weeks later on SmackDown with Nakamura as "Bakusai", defeating Kit Wilson and The Miz. On the November 13 episode of SmackDown, Bakusai challenged the MFTs (Talla Tonga and Tama Tonga) for the WWE Tag Team Championship but the match ended in a no contest after both teams were attacked by the War Raiders (Erik and Ivar).

== Other media ==
In January 2023, Takahashi made his acting debut in the Kamen Rider franchise, portraying Joseph Rando in Kamen Rider Outsiders.

== Championships and accomplishments ==
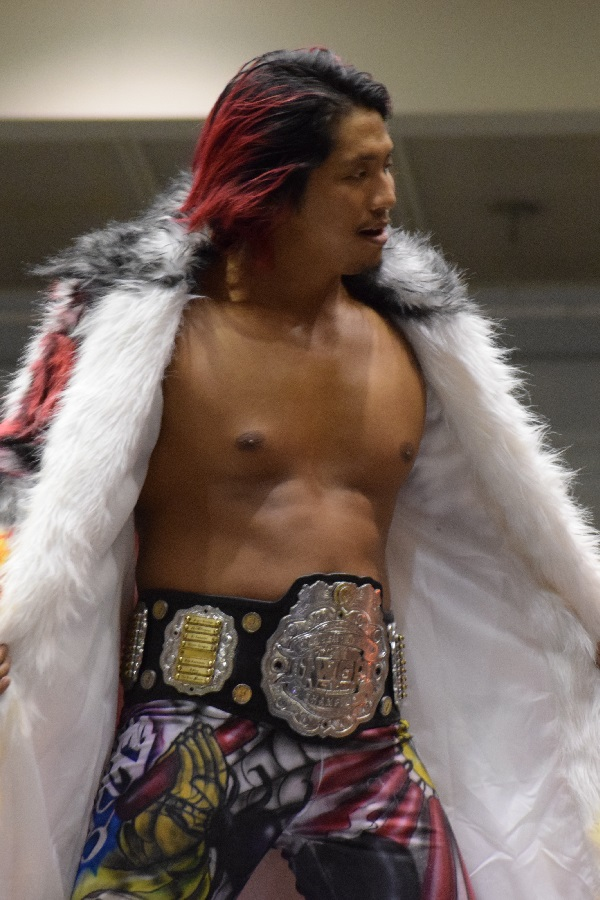
Takahashi is a five-time IWGP Junior Heavyweight Champion

- Consejo Mundial de Lucha Libre
  - CMLL World Lightweight Championship (1 time)
- DDT Pro-Wrestling
  - Ironman Heavymetalweight Championship (3 times)
- New Japan Pro-Wrestling
  - IWGP Tag Team Championship (1 time) – with Tetsuya Naito
  - IWGP Junior Heavyweight Championship (5 times)
  - NEVER Openweight 6-Man Tag Team Championship (1 time) – with Yota Tsuji and Bushi
  - Best of the Super Juniors (2018, 2020, 2021, 2022)
  - World Tag League (2024) – with Tetsuya Naito
- Pro Wrestling Noah
  - GHC Junior Heavyweight Championship (1 time)
  - Jr. Grand Prix (2025)
- Pro Wrestling Illustrated
  - Ranked No. 27 of the top 500 singles wrestlers in the PWI 500 in 2018
- Tokyo Sports
  - Fighting Spirit Award (2020)
  - Outstanding Performance Award (2023)
- Wrestling Observer Newsletter
  - Best Gimmick (2017) as part of Los Ingobernables de Japón
  - Non-Heavyweight MVP (2020)

== Luchas de Apuestas record ==
Winner (wager)	Loser (wager)	Location	Event	Date	Notes
Dragon Lee (mask)	Kamaitachi (mask)	Mexico City	Homenaje a Dos Leyendas	March 20, 2015	
Máximo Sexy (hair)	Kamaitachi (hair)	Mexico City	Sin Piedad	January 1, 2016	
