= Star Black (wrestler) =

Mexican professional wrestler

Personal information
- Born: October 18, 1993 (age 32) Guadalajara, Jalisco, Mexico

Professional wrestling career
- Ring name: Star Black
- Billed height: 1.80 m (5 ft 11 in)
- Billed weight: 95 kg (209 lb)
- Trained by: El Satánico; Gran Cochisse; Magnum
- Debut: April 22, 2015

Star Black (born October 18, 1993) is the ring name of a Mexican professional wrestler. He works for the Mexican wrestling promotion Consejo Mundial de Lucha Libre (CMLL), portraying a tecnico ("Good guy") wrestling character. His real name is not a matter of public record, as is often the case with masked wrestlers in Mexico where their private lives are kept a secret from the wrestling fans.

== Professional wrestling career ==
On June 6, 2023, at CMLL Martes de Arena Mexico, Star Black defeated El Sagrado for the Mexican National Heavyweight Championship.

== Championships and accomplishments ==
- Consejo Mundial de Lucha Libre
  - Mexican National Heavyweight Championship (1 time)
  - Occidente Heavyweight Championship (1 time)
  - Occidente Welterweight Championship (1 time)
  - Occidente Trios Championship (1 time) – with Explosivo and Fantástico
  - Torneo De Pareijas Increibles (2019) – with Difunto
  - Occidente Trios Title Tournament (2021) – with Explosivo and Fantastico

== Luchas de Apuestas record ==
Winner (wager)	Loser (wager)	Location	Event	Date	Notes
Star Black (mask)	El Gitano (mask)	Guadalajara, Jalisco	CMLL Guadalajara Domingos	June 26, 2016	(Note: This was a ten-way steel cage match, also involving Capitan Cobra, Cosmos, Explosivo, Linterna, Mr. Brisa, Relampago, Reycko and Thunder Boy)
Star Black (mask)	Frezzer (mask)	Guadalajara, Jalisco	CMLL Guadalajara Domingos	December 25, 2016	(Note: This was a ten-way steel cage match, also involving Infierno, Leon Blanco, Magnum, Mr. Trueno, Nautilius, Neutron, Pitbull I, and Rafaga.)
Star Black (mask)	Nautilius (mask)	Guadalajara, Jalisco	CMLL Guadalajara Domingos	June 11, 2017	
Star Black (mask)	Exterminador (hair)	Guadalajara, Jalisco	CMLL Guadalajara Domingos	September 10, 2017	
Star Black (mask)	Nautilius (hair)	Guadalajara, Jalisco	CMLL Guadalajara Domingos	January 7, 2018	
