= Infierno en el Ring (2013) =

Professional wrestling event which took place on July 19, 2013

- Official poster for the event
- Promotion: Consejo Mundial de Lucha Libre
- Date: July 19, 2013
- City: Mexico City, Mexico
- Venue: Arena México

Pay-per-view chronology
← Previous; Sin Salida	Next → Universal Championship

Infierno en el Ring chronology
← Previous; 2012	Next → 2014

Infierno en el Ring (2013) (Spanish for "Inferno in the Ring") was a major professional wrestling event produced by Consejo Mundial de Lucha Libre (CMLL), which took place on July 19, 2013 in Arena México, Mexico City, Mexico. The 2013 Infierno en el Ring replaced CMLL's regularly scheduled Friday night Super Viernes show. The 2013 Infierno en el Ring was the fifth show promoted under that name, the 15th time CMLL have promoted an Infierno en el Ring cage match as part of their events. The main event of the show was the eponymous Infierno en el Ring match that CMLL traditionally has traditionally held approximately once a year. The Infierno en el Ring match is a multi-person Steel Cage match contested under Lucha de Apuestas, or bet match, rules which means that the loser of the match would be forced to unmask or have their hair shaved off per Lucha Libre traditions. At the 2013 event 10 wrestlers participated, all unmasked, making it one of the few Infierno en el Ring matches to only have wrestlers risk their hair on the outcome of the match. The participants included Averno, Blue Panther, Brazo de Plata, Máximo, Mr. Águila, Negro Casas, Rey Bucanero, Rey Escorpión, Rush and Shocker. In the end Shocker pinned Mr. Águila to win the match.

== Production ==
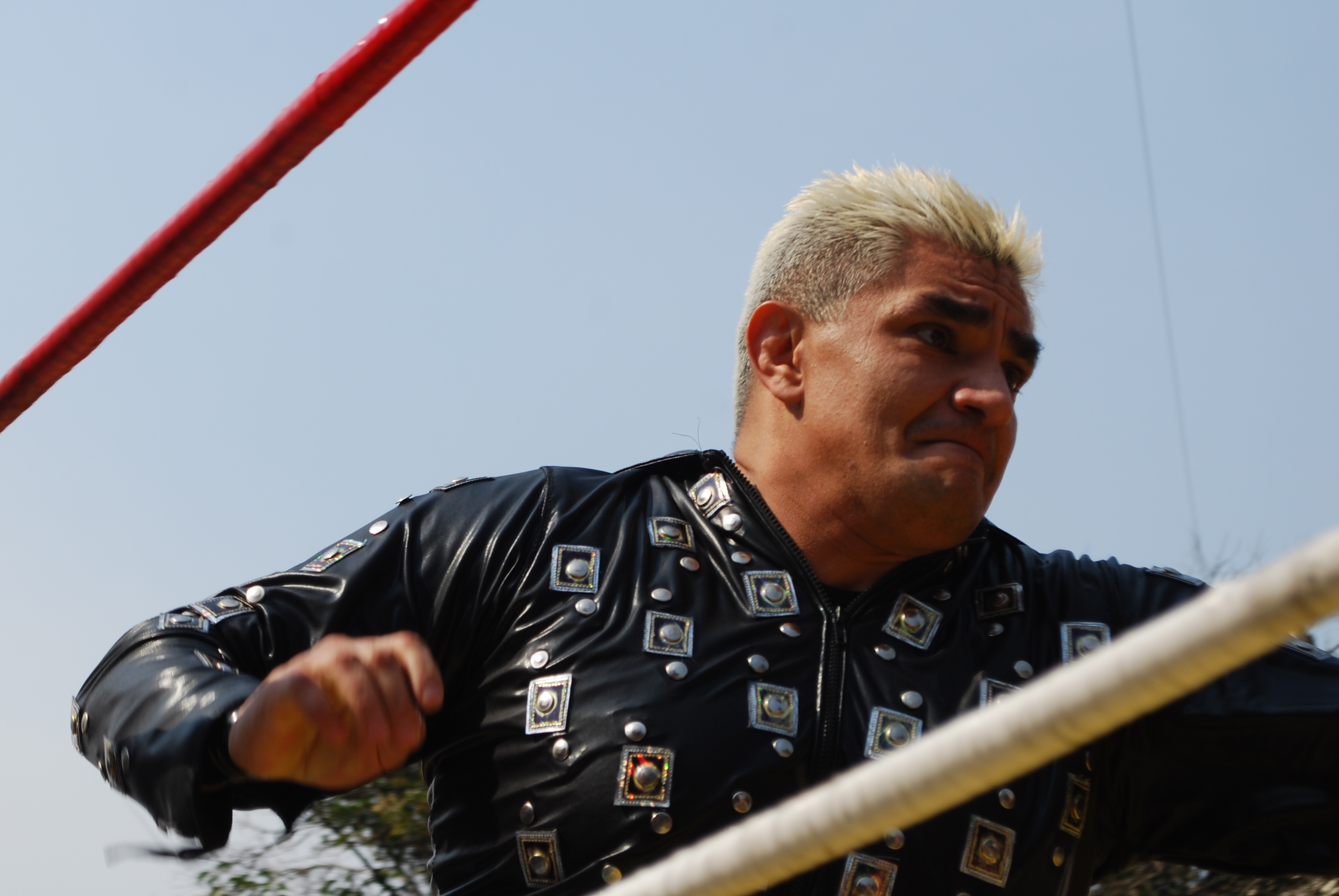
Shocker, winner of the main event

=== Background ===
The Mexican wrestling company Consejo Mundial de Lucha Libre (Spanish for "World Wrestling Council"; CMLL) has held a number of major shows over the years using the moniker Infierno en el Ring ("Inferno in the Ring"), all of which were main evented by a multi-man steel cage match, the eponymous Infierno en el Ring match. CMLL has use the Infierno en el Ring match on other shows, but will intermittently hold a show billed specifically as Infierno en el Ring, with the first such show held in 2008. It is not an annually recurring show, but instead held intermittently sometimes several years apart and not always in the same month of the year either. All Infierno en el Ring shows have been held in Arena México in Mexico City, Mexico which is CMLL's main venue, its "home". Traditionally CMLL holds their major events on Friday Nights, which means the Infierno en el Ring shows replace their regularly scheduled Super Viernes show. The 2013 Infierno en el Ring show was the fifth show to use the name.

=== Storylines ===
The event featured six professional wrestling matches with different wrestlers involved in pre-existing scripted feuds, plots and storylines. Wrestlers were portrayed as either heels (referred to as rudos in Mexico, those that portray the "bad guys") or faces (técnicos in Mexico, the "good guy" characters) as they followed a series of tension-building events, which culminated in a wrestling match or series of matches.

== Results ==
No.	Results	Stipulations
1	Diamante, Sagrado and Tritón defeated Puma and Los Guerreros Tuareg (Arkángel de la Muerte and Skándalo)	Best two-out-of-three falls six-man tag lucha libre rules team match
2	Dalys la Caribeña, Goya Kong and Marcela defeated Tiffany and Las Ladies de Polanco (Princesa Blanca and Princesa Sugehit)	Best two-out-of-three falls six-man tag lucha libre rules team match
3	Niebla Roja and Los Hijos del Averno (Ephesto and Mephisto) defeated La Máscara, Stuka Jr. and Titán	Best two-out-of-three falls six-man tag lucha libre rules team match
4	Comandante Pierroth and La Peste Negra (El Felino and Mr. Niebla) defeated Atlantis, Diamante Azul and Thunder	Best two-out-of-three falls six-man tag lucha libre rules team match
5	Místico, Máscara Dorada Valiente defeated Volador Jr. and Los Guerreros del Infierno (Euforia and Último Guerrero)	Best two-out-of-three falls six-man tag lucha libre rules team match
6	Shocker defeated Mr. Águila; Also in the match Averno, Blue Panther, Brazo de Plata, Máximo, Negro Casas, Rey Bucanero, Rey Escorpión and Rush	10-man Infierno en el Ring, Lucha de Apuesta Hair vs. Hair Steel cage match

=== Order of elimination ===
#	Name'
1	Rush
2	Rey Bucanero
3	Blue Panther
4	Negro Casas
5	Averno
6	Brazo de Plata
7	Maximo
8	Rey Escorpión
