= Infierno en el Ring (2009) =

Mexican professional wrestling supercard show

Infierno en el Ring 2009
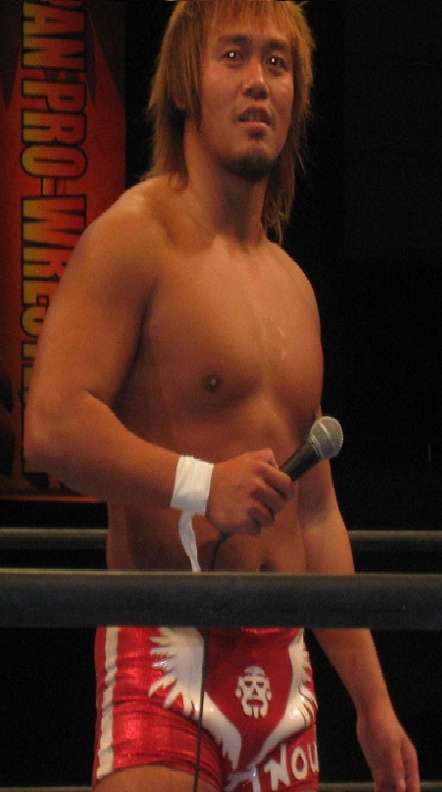
- Tetsuya Naito, won the main event match.
- Promotion: Consejo Mundial de Lucha Libre
- Date: July 31, 2009
- City: Mexico City, Mexico
- Venue: Arena México

Pay-per-view chronology
← Previous; Universal Championship	Next → CMLL 76th Anniversary Show

Infierno en el Ring chronology
← Previous; 2008	Next → 2010

Infierno en el Ring 2009 (Spanish for "Inferno in the Ring") was a professional wrestling major show event produced by Consejo Mundial de Lucha Libre (CMLL) that took place on July 31, 2009 in Arena Mexico, Mexico City, Mexico. The show consisted of five matches, the main event being the traditional CMLL Infierno en el Ring multi-man Steel Cage match where all the competitors risked their hair. This year 15 man participated in the steel cage match, which was the highest number ever for a CMLL Lucha de Apuestas (bet match). The match saw Naito pin Toscano to win the match; afterwards Toscano's hair was shaved off in the middle of the ring. The undercard saw three Six-man tag team matches, which is the most common match format in Lucha Libre.

The show was broadcase live on Mexican Radio and televised on the Televisa Deportiva Network. Some of the matches aired as part of CMLL's regular weekly wrestling shows.

== Production ==
=== Background ===
The Mexican wrestling company Consejo Mundial de Lucha Libre (Spanish for "World Wrestling Council"; CMLL) has held a number of major shows over the years using the moniker Infierno en el Ring ("Inferno in the Ring"), all of which were main evented by a multi-man steel cage match, the eponymous Infierno en el Ring match. CMLL has use the Infierno en el Ring match on other shows, but will intermittently hold a show billed specifically as Infierno en el Ring, with the first such show held in 2008. It is not an annually recurring show, but instead held intermittently sometimes several years apart and not always in the same month of the year either. All Infierno en el Ring shows have been held in Arena México in Mexico City, Mexico which is CMLL's main venue, its "home". Traditionally CMLL holds their major events on Friday Nights, which means the Infierno en el Ring shows replace their regularly scheduled Super Viernes show. The 2009 Infierno en el Ring show was the second show to use the name.

=== Storylines ===
The event featured four professional wrestling matches with different wrestlers involved in pre-existing scripted feuds, plots and storylines. Wrestlers were portrayed as either heels (referred to as rudos in Mexico, those that portray the "bad guys") or faces (técnicos in Mexico, the "good guy" characters) as they followed a series of tension-building events, which culminated in a wrestling match or series of matches.

The first indications of who would be involved in the 2009 Infierno en el Ring cage match came when Naito commented that one of his goals while working in Mexico was to win the hair of Héctor Garza. On July 10, 2009 Black Warrior made a challenge to Héctor Garza on behalf of Naito, since he did not speak Spanish. Shortly after the challenge it was announced by CMLL that nine wrestlers would participate in cage match: Naito, Yujiro, Black Warrior, Shocker, El Texano Jr., Negro Casas, El Terrible and Tarzan Boy but not Héctor Garza. On July 17, 2009, after losing a match to Blue Panther, Máximo and Toscano, Black Warrior challenged Blue Panther to put his hair on the line as well. Days later CMLL announce the final line-up for the cage match, 15 men in total were announced, the largest number for any CMLL cage match ever. Besides those already announced CMLL added Blue Panther, Máxmio, Ray Mendoza Jr., Heavy Metal, Shigeo Okumura and Mictlán.

Three further matches were announced, all of them traditional Lucha Libre Six-man tag team matches, involving some wrestlers who were working storyline feuds against each other. In the opening match CMLL Arena Coliseo Tag Team Champions Flash and Stuka Jr. would team up with Metálico to take on Los Infernales ("The Infernal Ones"; Virus and Euforia) and Skandalo. Flash and Stuka Jr. had been feuding with Los Infernales over the Arena Coliseo Tag Team titles since Flash and Stuka Jr. won them.

The next match announced was Los Hijos del Averno ("the Sons of Hell"), the team of Averno, Mephisto and Ephesto facing El Hijo del Fantasma, La Máscara and El Sagrado. Hijo del Fantasm and La Mascara, along with Héctor Garza, were the CMLL World Trios Champions, a title Los Hijos del Inferno had been vocal about challenging for in the weeks leading up to Infierno en el Ring. With Garza booked for the main event Hijo del Fantama and la Mascara were teamed up with El Sagrado for a three on three match.

The last undercard match announced was Místico teaming up with the CMLL World Tag Team Champions La Sombra and Volador Jr. to form a team called Los Terroristas del Aire ("The Terrorists of the Air") to face Atlantis, Último Guerrero and Mr. Niebla. Both Último Guerrero and Mr. Niebla had made several mask challenges towards Místico, without a match being announced yet; while Guerrero and Atlantis also wanted to face Sombra and Volador Jr. for the tag team titles at some point.

== Event ==
=== Undercard matches ===
The opening match of the show was a six-man tag team match, best two out of three falls between the técnico team of Flash, Stuka Jr. and Metálico against the rudos Virus, Euforia and Skandalo. After just over five minutes of action Flash rolled Virus up with La Magistra Cradle to win the first fall. The Rúdo team evened the score minutes later when Virus, Euforia and Skandalo applied a triple team submission move to make Flash submit, tying the teams at one fall each. The final fall saw Euforia pin Metalico and Skandalo defeat Stuka Jr. to win the match for the Rúdo team two to one.

In the second match of the night Los Hijos del Avernoquickly won the first fall against Hijo del Fantasm, La Máscara and El Sagrado when the trio performed a triple Powerbomb on Hijo del Fantasm for the pinfall. La Máscara evened the score for his team when he made Averno submit after applying a pendulum submission hold known as a Campana on him. During the third fall Averno pulled the mask off La Máscara which caused a disqualification, in Lucha Libre the intentional removal of an opponent's mask during the match is an automatic disqualification. The disqualification cost lost Hijos del Averno the match two falls to one.

In the third and final undercard match saw Los Terroristas del Aire face off against Atlantic, Último Guerrero and Mr. Niebla. Místico, Volador Jr. and La Sombra all wore masks that were composites of all three masks to show their team unity. During the first fall Místico and Último Guerrero found themselves on the floor, outside the ring as Volador Jr. landed a Guillotine legdrop off the top rope on Mr. Niebla while La Sombra performed a back flip off the top rope, called a Moonsault, on Atlantis for the double pinfall. The second fall saw Último Guerrero intentionally pull his own mask off and put it in Místico's hands so it looked like Místico pulled the mask off him. The ploy worked as the referee disqualified Místico's team despite their protests. In the final fall Místico turned the tables on the rudos but throwing his mask to Último Guerrero and draw an unwarranted disqualification for their second fall.

=== Main event matches ===
The fourth match of the evening was the Infierno en el Ring cage match where 15 competitors all put their hair on the line. After all the participants had entered the ring it was announced that it was not allowed to escape the cage until five minutes into the match. Mictlán was the first wrestler to escape the cage as he was straddling the top of the cage when the five-minute time limit expired, Heavy Metal escaped less than a minute later. Over the next couple of minutes Blue Panther, Shigeo Okumura, El Terrible and Máximo all escaped the cage by climbing up the side and over the top to the floor. Shocker, Texano Jr., Ray Mendoza Jr. and Negro Casas were next to escape leaving only five men in the ring: Héctor Garza, Black Warrior, Toscano, Yujiro and Naito. At one point Garza had climbed to the top of the cage and could have left the cage but instead he opted to vault backwards off the top of the cage onto the four remaining competitors, performing a Moonsault. After knocking everyone else down, Garza easily climbed the cage and escaped. Black Warrior was the first of the four to get back to his feet and escaped the cage while Yujiro and Naito stopped Toscano from leaving. After beating up Toscano for a moment both Yujiro and Naito started to climb up opposite sides of the cage. Toscano managed to jump up and stop Naito from leaving the ring, but Yujiro was too fast to be stopped, leaving Natio and Toscano as the final two men.

Naito and Toscano faced off in a regular one on one match to see who would have their hair shaved off. After just over four minutes and thirty seconds Naito pinned Toscano using a Dragon Suplex into a pinning combination for the victory. After the match Toscano was shaved completely bald.

== Results ==
No.	Results	Stipulations	Times
1	Virus, Euforia and Skandalo defeated Los Bombardieros (Flash and Stuka Jr.) and Metálico: Flash pinned Virus (1-0); Virus, Euforia and Skandalo made Flash submit (1-1); Euforia pinned Metalico / Skanaldo defeated Stuka Jr. (2-1)	Six-man "Lucha Libre rules" tag team match	11:11 (05:44) (02:45) (02:45)
2	El Hijo del Fantasma, La Máscara and El Sagrado defeated Los Hijos del Averno (Averno, Mephisto and Ephesto): Los Hijos del Averno pinned Hijo del Fantasma (1-0); La Máscara pinned Averno (1-1); Los Hijos del Averno were disqualified for unmasking La Máscara. (2-1)	Six-man "Lucha Libre rules" tag team match	14:14 (03:22) (03:37) (07:15)
3	Los Terroristas del Aire (Místico, La Sombra and Volador Jr.) defeated Atlantis, Mr. Niebla and Último Guerrero: Volador Jr. pinned Mr. Niebla / La Sombra pinned Atlantis (1-0); Místico was disqualified (1-1); Último Guerrero was disqualified (2-1)	Six-man "Lucha Libre rules" tag team match	09:45 (01:45) (05:05) (02:52)
4	Naito defeated Toscano; Also in the match: Shocker, Héctor Garza, Negro Casas, Black Warrior, El Terrible, El Texano Jr., Yujiro, Shigeo Okumura, Blue Panther, Máximo, Ray Mendoza Jr., Heavy Metal and Mictlán	15-man Infierno en el Ring, Lucha de Apuestas hair vs. hair Steel cage match	15:30

#	Name	Time
1	Mictlán	05:00
2	Heavy Metal	05:07
3	Blue Panther	06:20
4	Shigeo Okumura	06:22
5	El Terrible	07:18
6	Máximo	07:45
7	Shocker	09:18
8	El Texano Jr.	10:10
9	Ray Mendoza Jr.	10:56
10	Negro Casas	11:28
11	Héctor Garza	14:49
12	Black Warrior	15:20
13	Yujiro	15:23
