= Infierno en el Ring (2008) =

Mexican professional wrestling supercard show

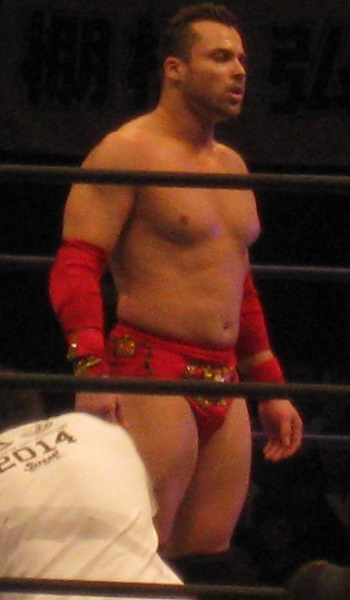
- Alex Koslov, one of 10 men risking their hair in the main event of Infierno en el Ring
- Promotion: Consejo Mundial de Lucha Libre
- Date: June 13, 2008
- City: Mexico City, Mexico
- Venue: Arena México

Pay-per-view chronology
← Previous; Reyes del Aire	Next → Leyenda de Plata

Infierno en el Ring chronology
← Previous; First	Next → 2009

Infierno en el Ring (2008) (Spanish for "Inferno in the ring") was a professional wrestling Pay-Per-View (PPV) produced by Consejo Mundial de Lucha Libre (CMLL), which took place on June 13, 2008 in Arena México, Mexico City, Mexico. The main event was the eponymous Infierno en el Ring match that CMLL traditionally holds at least once a year. In 2008 the match was given its own event, whereas previously it had been a part of other events. The Infierno en el Ring match is a multi-man Steel Cage match where all the competitors risked their hair, with the last wrestler in the ring being shaved bald. The 2008 event saw ten men risk their hair: Heavy Metal, El Texano Jr., Damián 666, Mr. Águila, El Terrible, Perro Aguayo Jr., Shocker, Marco Corleone, Negro Casas and Alex Koslov. The event also featured 5 Six-man "Lucha Libre rules" tag team match, including the finals of a tournament to determine the next holders of the CMLL World Trios Championship as Los Ángleles (Spanish for "The Angels; Héctor Garza, El Hijo del Fantasma and La Máscara faced Blue Panther, Dos Caras Jr. and Místico.

== Production ==
=== Background ===
The Mexican wrestling company Consejo Mundial de Lucha Libre (Spanish for "World Wrestling Council"; CMLL) has held a number of major shows over the years using the moniker Infierno en el Ring ("Inferno in the Ring"), all of which were main evented by a multi-man steel cage match, the eponymous Infierno en el Ring match. CMLL has use the Infierno en el Ring match on other shows, but will intermittently hold a show billed specifically as Infierno en el Ring, with the first such show held in 2008. It is not an annually recurring show, but instead held intermittently sometimes several years apart and not always in the same month of the year either. All Infierno en el Ring shows have been held in Arena México in Mexico City, Mexico which is CMLL's main venue, its "home". Traditionally CMLL holds their major events on Friday Nights, which means the Infierno en el Ring shows replace their regularly scheduled Super Viernes show. The 2008 Infierno en el Ring show was the first show to use the name.

=== Storylines ===
The event featured five professional wrestling matches with different wrestlers involved in pre-existing scripted feuds, plots and storylines. Wrestlers were portrayed as either heels (referred to as rudos in Mexico, those that portray the "bad guys") or faces (técnicos in Mexico, the "good guy" characters) as they followed a series of tension-building events, which culminated in a wrestling match or series of matches.

== Results ==
No.	Results	Stipulations	Times
1	Flash, Stuka Jr. and Máscara Purpura defeated Los Guerreros Tuareg (Arkangel de la Muerte, Loco Max and Skándalo) (two falls to one): First fall: Loco Max forced Máscara Purpura to submit, Skándalo pinned Flash (1-0); Second fall: Stuka Jr. pinned Arkangel de la Muerte (1-1); Third fall: Máscara Purpura pinned Arkangel de la Muerte (2-1)	Six-man "Lucha Libre rules" tag team match	11:18 (05:08) (09:03) (11:18)
2	La Triada del Terror (Averno, Ephesto and Mephisto) defeated Grey Shadow, El Sagrado and Valiente (two falls to one): First fall:Mephisto forced Valiente to submit, Averno forced Grey Shadow to submit (1-0); Second fall: Grey Shadow forced Mephisto to submit, Valiente forced Ephesto to submit (1-1); Third fall: Ephesto pinned El Sagrado (2-1)	Six-man "Lucha Libre rules" tag team match	11:15 (03:57) (08:05) (11:15)
3	Dr. Wagner Jr., La Sombra and Volador Jr. defeated Los Guerreros de Atlantida (Atlantis, Rey Bucanero and Último Guerrero) (two falls to one): First fall: Rey Bucanero pinned Dr. Wagner Jr. (1-0); Second fall: Volador Jr. pinned Último Guerrero, La Sombra pinned Rey Bucanero (1-1); Third fall: Dr. Wagner Jr. pinned Atlantis (2-1)	Six-man "Lucha Libre rules" tag team match	14:15 (02:14) (06:24) (14:15)
4	Los Ángeles (Héctor Garza, El Hijo del Fantasma and La Máscara) defeated Blue Panther, Dos Caras Jr. and Místico (two falls to one): First fall: Dos Caras Jr. pinned La Máscara, Blue Panther forced Hijo del Fantasma to submit (1-0); Second fall: La Máscara pinned Blue Panther (1-1); Third fall: Héctor Garza pinned Místico (2-1)	Six-man "Lucha Libre rules" tag team match for the vacant CMLL World Trios Championship	20:47 (07:12) (12:36) (20:47)
5	El Texano Jr. defeated Heavy Metal; Also in the match: Damián 666, Mr. Águila, El Terrible, Perro Aguayo Jr., Shocker, Marco Corleone, Negro Casas and Alex Koslov	10-man Infierno en el Ring, Lucha de Apuesta hair vs. hair Steel cage match	21:41

=== Infierno en el Ring order of escape ===
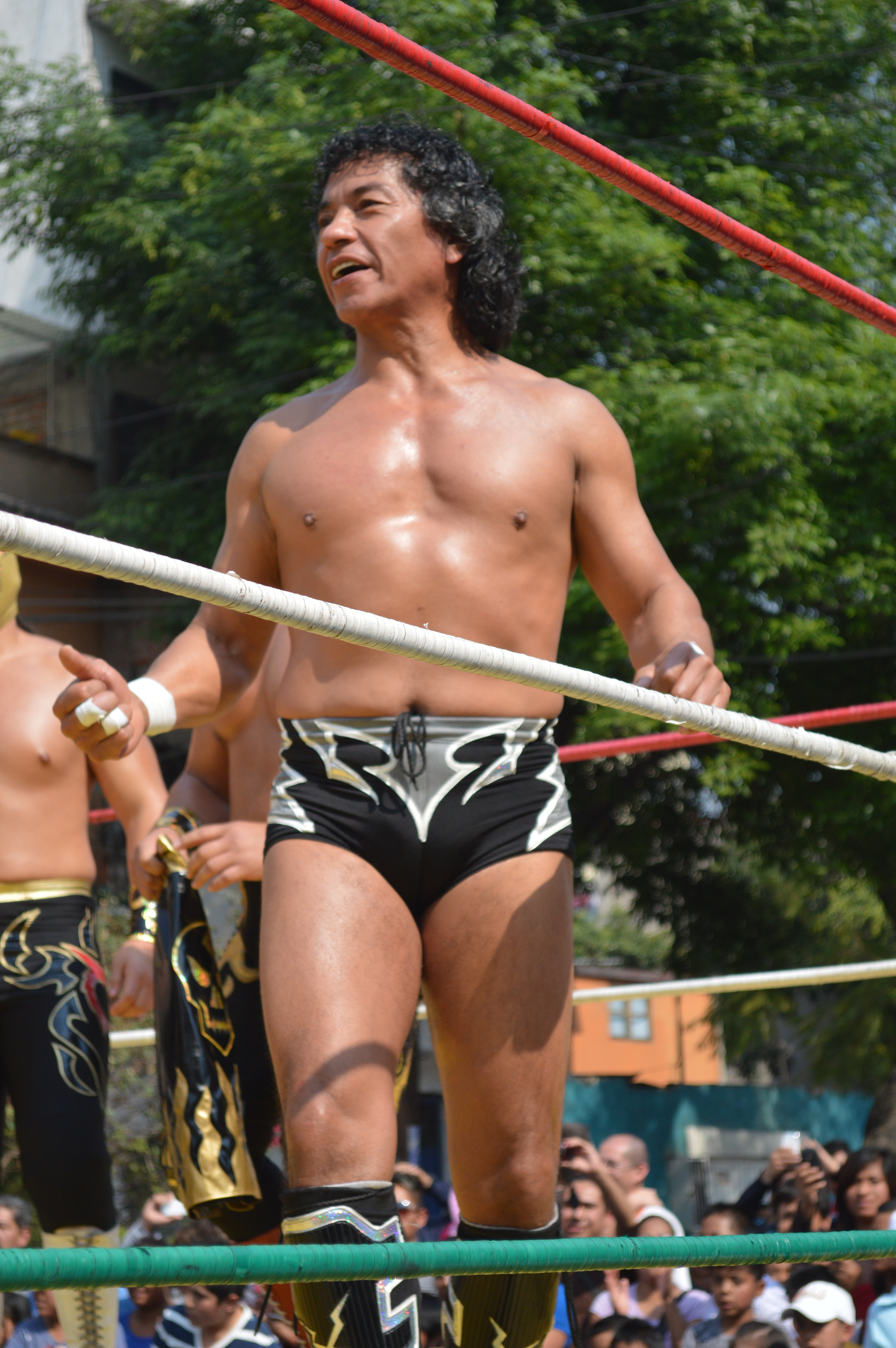
Negro Casas, the second to last man to escape the cage.

Order	Wrestler	Time
1	Alex Koslov	07:15
2	Damián 666	09:16
3	Marco Corleone	09:47
4	El Terrible	11:34
5	Mr. Águila	12:09
6	Shocker	12:20
7	Negro Casas	16:29
8	Perro Aguayo Jr.	18:06
