= Infierno en el Ring (2010) =

Mexican professional wrestling show

- Promotion: Consejo Mundial de Lucha Libre
- Date: July 18, 2010
- City: Mexico City, Mexico
- Venue: Arena México

Pay-per-view chronology
← Previous; Torneo Bicentenario	Next → Universal Championship

Infierno en el Ring chronology
← Previous; 2009	Next → 2012

Infierno en el Ring (2010) (Spanish for "Inferno in the ring") was a professional wrestling supercard produced by Consejo Mundial de Lucha Libre (CMLL), which took place on June 18, 2010 in Arena Mexico, Mexico City, Mexico. Previous year's Infierno en el Ring events have been held on Fridays, replacing CMLL's regularly scheduled Super Viernes show, but in 2010 the event was held on Sunday night instead. The 2010 Infierno en el Ring is the third show under that name and the 13th time CMLL have promoted an Infierno en el Ring cage match.

The main event of the show will be the eponymous Infierno en el Ring match that CMLL traditionally has traditionally held approximately once a year and which has headlined its own specific show since 2008. The Infierno en el Ring match is a multi-man Steel Cage match contested under Lucha de Apuestas, or bet match, rules which means that the loser of the match would be forced to unmask per. Lucha Libre traditions. At the 2010 event 12 wrestlers will put their mask on the line in the match: Ángel de Oro, Ángel de Plata, Ángel Azteca Jr., Diamante, Fabián el Gitano, Sensei, Hooligan, Monster, Puma King, Tiger Kid, Doctor X and Histeria. The match saw Ángel de Oro pin Fabián el Gitano to unmask him. The show also featured three Six-man "Lucha Libre rules" tag team match and a tag team match to open the show.

== Production ==
=== Background ===
The Mexican wrestling company Consejo Mundial de Lucha Libre (Spanish for "World Wrestling Council"; CMLL) has held a number of major shows over the years using the moniker Infierno en el Ring ("Inferno in the Ring"), all of which were main-evented by a multi-man steel cage match, the eponymous Infierno en el Ring match. CMLL has used the Infierno en el Ring match on other shows, but will intermittently hold a show billed specifically as Infierno en el Ring, with the first such show held in 2008. It is not an annually recurring show, but instead held intermittently sometimes several years apart and not always in the same month of the year either. All Infierno en el Ring shows have been held in Arena México in Mexico City, Mexico, which is CMLL's main venue, its "home". Traditionally CMLL holds their major events on Friday nights, which means the Infierno en el Ring shows replace their regularly scheduled Super Viernes show. The 2010 Infierno en el Ring show was the third show to use the name.

=== Storylines ===
The event featured five professional wrestling matches with different wrestlers involved in pre-existing scripted feuds, plots and storylines. Wrestlers were portrayed as either heels (referred to as rudos in Mexico, those that portray the "bad guys") or faces (técnicos in Mexico, the "good guy" characters) as they followed a series of tension-building events, which culminated in a wrestling match or series of matches.

The foundation of the 12-man steel cage match storyline began around April, 2010 with a developing rivalry between the tecnico (good guy) Fabián el Gitano and the rudo (bad guy) Doctor X on CMLL's secondary shows in Guadalajara, Jalisco. After a month of mask challenges between the two the feud was finally featured in CMLL's main venue, Arena Mexico in late May, indicating that a potential Lucha de Apuestas, mask vs. mask match, could be happening soon. Throughout May and June several other mid-card wrestlers became involved in storylines that saw Apuesta challenges made. The team of Ángel de Oro, Ángel de Plata and Sensei challenged the team of Puma King, Tiger Kid and Arkangel de la Muerte to an Apuesta match after Arkangel cheated to win a trios match. When the Infierno en el Ring match was finally announced Arkangel de la Muerte was not among the participants, instead his Los Guerreros Tuareg teammate Hooligan was in addition to Ángel Azteca Jr., Diamante and Los Invasores members Monster and Histeria. Histeria's inclusion in the match was a bit of a surprise as he was also scheduled to participate in a 10-man Lucha de Apuesta match on June 12, only 6 days before Infierno en el Ring, with the booking either revealing that Histeria was keeping his mask, or announced as a misdirection to make Histeria's mask loss on June 12 more of a surprise.

The announced undercard featured three Six-man "Lucha Libre rules" tag team match, the most common match form in CMLL. These matches feature a combination of ongoing storylines, emerging storylines or seemingly random teams. In the semi-main event Místico teams up with Shocker and Brazo de Plata to take on Jushin Thunder Liger, Atlantis and Héctor Garza. The two main focal points in the match is Místico's rivalry with New Japan Pro-Wrestling's Jushin Thunder Liger who's on tour with CMLL, potentially building to a title match between the two over the CMLL World Welterweight Championship which Liger holds. The other storyline featured in the semi-main event is the feud between Brazo de Plata and Héctor Garza. Plata and Garza used to team together, with Garza even helping Brazo de Plata losing some of his considerable weight. In May, 2010 Héctor Garza turned rudo on his friends, attacking them during a match and ever since he has been at odds with Brazo de Plata.

In the third match of the night Mexican National Welterweight Champion Valiente teamed up with the reigning CMLL Arena Coliseo Tag Team Champions Stuka Jr. and Fuego. They will take on the team of Misterioso II, who was looking for a title match with Valiente and Virus and Euforia who represented the group Los Cancerberos del Infierno, which has been trying to take the Arena Coliseo Tag Team Championship away from the current champions.

== Event ==
The show opened with the man who was unmasked the last time CMLL held an Infierno en el Ring match, Tigre Blanco teaming up with the rookie Metatron to take on the team of Inquisidor and El Cholo, who had been paired up for the show. The tecnico team of Tigre and Metatron won the first fall when Metatron pinned Inquisidor and Tigre Blanco pinned Cholo. In the second fall the rudo team tied up the score 1-1 when Cholo pinned Metatron and Inquisidor pinned Tigre Blanco. The third fall was the longest of the match and saw Tigre Blanco win the match for his team.

The second match of the night saw two substitutes take place compared to the original card. Luna Mágica was originally scheduled to team with Lady Apache and Marcela, but was replaced with Dalys la Caribeña, the wife of Negro Casas who made her wrestling debut in 2010. On the Rudo side Mima Shimoda was supposed to team up with Las Zorras ("The Foxes"; Princesa Blanca and Princesa Sujei), but instead they teamed up with La Seductora without any explanations of why the replacements were made. Las Zorras took the first fall after Princesa Sujei pinned Lady Apache following a Torbellino splash and Princesa Blanca pinned Dalys. In the second fall the tecnicas regained momentum when Marcela executed what was described as a "brutal Michinoku Driver" on La Seductora and pinned her. In the final fall Dalys la Caribeña uses the Casas trademark La Casita cradle to gain the three count and the victory for her team. Following the match Lady Apache and Marcela hugged, showing no signs of animosity despite being booked for a singles match against each other on the following Super Viernes.

Misterioso II and Los Cancerberos both improved their chances of gaining a championship match down the line as they defeated Mexican National Welterweight Champion Valiente and CMLL Arena Coliseo Tag Team Champions Stuka Jr. and Fuego two falls to one. Misterioso pinned Fuego and Virus pinned Stuka Jr. In the second fall the champions Valiente took out Virus with a Topé suicida while Stuka Jr. pinned Misteriosos after a Plancha style splash. Despite a moment of miscommunication where Misterioso kicked Euforia the team still managed to win the match when Misterioso pinned Fuego. Following the match the rudos shook hands, clearing up any misunderstandings between them.

The fourth match saw two replacements made just like the second match of the night had. On the tecnico side Máximo replaced his father Brazo de Plata, teaming with Místico and Shocker while Héctor Garza was replaced by Último Guerrero teaming up with fellow Los Guerreros del Atlantidad member Atlantis and Jushin Thunder Liger. Liger almost won the first fall for his team when he applied a submission move on Máximo, but before Máximo could submit Místico and Shocker surprised Los Guerreros by rolling them up for the pinfall victory. Liger's team gained a measure of revenge when Liger pinned Shocker after a Ligerbomb. The third and deciding fall came when Místico used his trademark La Mística submission hold, giving the tecnicos the 2–1 victory.

The CMLL crew took less than 15 minutes to set up the steel cage for the main event, which was fast for the type of cage that CMLL uses. After the cage was assembled the participants for the Infierno en el Ring match came to the ring, tecnicos first (Ángel de Oro, Ángel de Plata, Ángel Azteca Jr., Diamante, Fabián el Gitano and Sensei) followed by the rudos (Doctor X, Hooligan, Puma King, Tiger Kid, Monster and Histeria). Before the match it was announced that there would be a three-minute time limit where wrestlers were not allowed to escape the cage. Once the bell rings all 12 wrestlers began fighting, some pairing up against the wrestlers they had been feuding with for a while, Dr. X and Fabián el Gitano, Los Ángeles and Puma King and Tiger Kid. The theme of the match was "every man for himself", demonstrated by Hooligan as he was the first man to escape after the time limit expired, distracting his teammate Doctor X in order to escape the cage. Ángel de Oro and Ángel de Plata both climbed the cage at the same time, only to have Ángel de Plata pull his brother off the cage so he could escape himself. While the other wrestlers were preoccupied Monster saw an opening and climbed out of the cage, the third man to escape the match. Moments later Sensei becomes the fourth man to escape the cage, keeping his mask safe. The brother team of Puma King and Tiger Kid are the next to try to escape the cage, but like with the Ángel brothers Tiger Kid prevented his brother from escaping so that he could get out of the cage himself. Out next was Ángel Azteca Jr. who climbed over the cage to ensure he would not have to fight for his mask that night. Puma King and Ángel de Oro seemed to work together to escape the cage, only for Puma King to double cross Ángel de Oro so that Puma King could escape the cage. With Diamante's escape there are only four wrestlers left in the ring. Histeria quickly abandons fellow rudo Doctor X to escape the cage, saving his match for the second time in a week. In the cage Ángel de Oro accidentally hit Fabián el Gitano when he was trying to hit Doctor X. This gave the Doctor an opening to escape the cage, choosing to leave the cage instead of trying to punish his rival Fabián el Gitano further.

Since Ángel de Oro and Fabián el Gitano were the last two men left in the cage they were forced to wrestle against each other under Lucha de Apuesta rules inside the cage. After a short match between the two Ángel de Oro pinned Fabián, earning his first mask victory of his career. Following the match Fabián el Gitano unmasked, then announced that he real name was Emilio Fabian Fernandez de Leon born in Mexico City, 38 years old and had 16 years of wrestling experience. Following Ángel de Oro's victory his brother Ángel de Plata came to the ring to congratulate his brother without any signs of resentment for the actions taken during the match.

=== Results ===
No.	Results	Stipulations	Times
1	Tigre Blanco and Metatron defeated Inquisidor and El Cholo – two falls to one	Tag team match	14:12
2	Lady Apache, Dalys la Caribeña and Marcela defeated Las Zorras (Princesa Blanca and Princesa Sujei) and La Seductora – two falls to one	Six-man "Lucha Libre rules" tag team match	16:34
3	Misterioso II and Los Cancerberos del Infierno (Virus and Euforia) defeated Valiente, Stuka Jr. and Fuego – two falls to one	Six-man "Lucha Libre rules" tag team match	19:43
4	Místico, Shocker and Máximo defeated Jushin Thunder Liger and Los Guerreros del Atlantidad (Atlantis and Último Guerrero) – two falls to one	Six-man "Lucha Libre rules" tag team match	12:56
5	Ángel de Oro defeated Fabián el Gitano; Also in the match: Ángel de Plata, Ángel Azteca Jr., Diamante, Sensei, Hooligan, Monster, Puma King, Tiger Kid, Doctor X and Histeria	12-man Infierno en el Ring, Lucha de Apuestas mask vs. mask Steel cage match	23:18

#	Name	Time
1	Hooligan	05:13
2	Ángel de Plata	06:35
3	Monster	07:43
4	Sensei	08:41
5	Tiger Kid	09:37
6	Ángel Azteca Jr.	11:03
7	Puma King	11:50
8	Diamante	12:35
9	Histeria	15:17
10	Doctor X	17:31
