= La Vaquerita =

Mexican professional wrestler

Personal information
- Born: Isabel Ordóñez Martínez; May 16, 1978 (age 48) Guadalajara, Jalisco, Mexico

Professional wrestling career
- Ring name(s): Alaska; Gypsy; La Vaquerita
- Billed height: 1.55 m (5 ft 1 in)
- Billed weight: 56 kg (123 lb)
- Trained by: Arkangel de la Muerte; Diablo Velasco; Franco Colombo; Gran Cochisse; Virus
- Debut: June 1993

Isabel Ordóñez Martínez, better known under her ring name La Vaquerita (Spanish for "The Little Cowgirl"; born May 16, 1978, in Guadalajara, Jalisco, Mexico) is the ring name of a Mexican professional wrestler working for the Mexican promotion Consejo Mundial de Lucha Libre (CMLL) portraying a ruda ("bad girl") wrestling character. La Vaquerita's real name was not a matter of public record until she lost her mask at the 2016 Infierno en el Ring show. She was the first holder of the Lucha POP Women's Championship and made her debut for CMLL in late 2012.

== Professional wrestling career ==
La Vaquerita became interested in professional wrestling by pure chance, passing by Arena Coliseo in her native Guadalajara, Jalisco she noticed that they had female wrestlers on the card and became interested. She went to renowned wrestling trainer Diablo Velasco who lived in Guadalajara and got accepted into his wrestling school. According to Vaquerita she was the last female wrestler to be trained by Diablo Velasco before he retired in 1997. She began working as a professional wrestler in 1993 at the age of only 16, as she was a last minute replacement when wrestler Miss Janeth was injured and the promoter was a woman short for the show. Even after her debut she continued her training under Velasco when she was not booked on shows. Initially she worked under the ring name Gypsy, a wrestling masked character. Later on she would adopt the ring name "Alaska" as she worked primarily in and around Guadalajara. At one point during either her time as Gypsy or Alaska she took an extended sabbatical from wrestling to have a child.

=== La Vaquerita (2008–present) ===
After having worked as Alaska for some years La Vaquerita decided to change her name in 2008, inspired by some of the cheers and chants she got when she wore leather chaps to the ring during a match she decided to change her ring character and mask when her wrestling license was up for renewal anyway, giving birth to the "La Vaquerita" (The Cowgirl") ring character. She continued to work on the independent circuit, but started to work more and more outside of Guadalajara, working for promotions such as Xtreme Latin American Wrestling (XLAW), Los Perros del Mal, International Wrestling Revolution Group (IWRG) and Desastre Total Ultraviolento (DTU), normally working as a tecnica, a wrestler portraying the "good guys", also referred to as "a face". Vaquerita often faced off against Chica Tormenta and Keira, the latter of whom she developed a long running rivalry.

On January 29, 2011, she worked a Mixed tag team match, teaming with male wrestler La Hormiga, losing to AAA wrestler Sexy Star and Zumbi, marking her first time wrestling against someone from one of the "big two" promotions in Mexico, AAA and Consejo Mundial de Lucha Libre. On January 30, 2011, she defeated Keira, Megan and Ashley to win DTU's Trofeo Promociones RAD tournament. In March she teamed up with Cerebro Negro and Comando Negro to win a four team intergender tournament on a DTU show. La Vaquerita was one of six women from the independent circuit who was given a chance to compete for a match against the then reigning AAA Reina de Reinas Champion through DTU's relationship with AAA. La Vaquerita saw herself lose to constant rival Keira. She was one of seven women vying for the newly created Pro-Lucha POP Women's Championship during Pro-Wrestling POP's debut show. La Vaquerita and rival Keira survived a Battle Royal to continue on to the finals of the tournament where La Vaquerita pinned her longtime rival to win the championship. In July, 2011 La Vaquerita had an opportunity to become a double champion as she competed for the vacant DTU Chica Tercera Caida Championship, but lost to Vaneli in the torneo cibernetico, elimination match. She had her first successful POP Women's Championship on August 27, 2011, as she defeated both Keira and Lolita. A few months later she was one of 15 men and women who risked their mask or hair on the outcome of a steel cage match, where the last person remaining in the cage would be either unmasked or shaved bald. The match also included female wrestlers Chica Tormenta, Herejia, Keira, Vaneli and male wrestlers Chucho el Roto, Epitafio, Iron Love, Mr. Potro, Ronny el Italiano, Ronny Ventura, Trauma I, Trauma II, Yakuza and the loser Mexico Bronco who was shaved bald after the match. On October 2, 2011, La Vaquerita put her POP Women's Championship on the line against Chica Tormenta's Lucha Libre Feminil Junior Championship in a match that ended in a double pin, thus both champions left with their titles. La Vaquerita followed up with a third and a fourth successful defense against Vaneli and Yuki Star. On February 19, 2012, during the debut show of the Daga Dynamite Dojo X-Project promotion La Vaquerita's 204-day-long run with the Pro-Lucha POP Women's Championship came to an end when she lost to Canadian LuFisto, two falls to one.

=== Conejo Mundial de Lucha Libre (2012–present) ===
In late 2012 La Vaquerita wrestled a try-out match for CMLL, working as a ruda (bad guy character) for the first time, teaming with CMLL regulars Mima Shimoda and Zeuxis as they lost to Marcela, Dalys La Caribeña and Lady Afrodita in a match designed to give the CMLL officials a chance to evaluate her work. At the time she did not sign a contract with CMLL. Her try-out was successful and by early 2013 she started working more shows for CMLL, including a match on CMLL's main show CMLL Super Viernes scheduled for April 12. On September 8, La Vaquerita and Zeuxis won a tournament for the Reina World Tag Team Championship in Kawasaki, Japan. They lost the title to Aki Shizuku and Aliya on November 2. On December 25, 2016, she lost a steel cage match in the main event of the 2016 Infierno en el Ring show when she was pinned by Zeuxis. As a result she was forced to unmask and reveal her birth name; Isabel Ordóñez Martínez.

== Championships and accomplishments ==
- Desastre Total Ultraviolento
  - Trofeo Promociones RAD (2011)
- Pro-Lucha POP
  - Pro-Lucha POP Women's Championship (1 time)
- Reina Joshi Puroresu
  - Reina World Tag Team Championship (1 time) – with Zeuxis
  - Reina World Tag Team Championship Tournament (2013)

== Luchas de Apuestas record ==
Winner (wager)	Loser (wager)	Location	Event	Date	Notes
Zeuxis (mask)	La Vaquerita (mask)	Mexico City	Infierno en el Ring	December 25, 2016	(Note: Last two wrestlers in a 10-woman steel cage match that also included La Jarochita, Sanely, Princesa Sugehit, Marcela, Estellita, Dalys, La Amapola and Metálica)
Reyna Isis (mask)	La Vaquerita (hair)	Mexico City	Homenaje a Dos Leyendas	March 18, 2022	
