= CMLL Día de Muertos (2020) =

Major Mexican professional wrestling show

- Promotion: Consejo Mundial de Lucha Libre
- Date: October 30, 2020
- City: Mexico City, Mexico
- Venue: Arena México

Event chronology
← Previous; Mexican National Women's Tag Team Championship tournament	Next → La Copa Junior VIP

Día de Muertos chronology
← Previous; 2019	Next → 2021

The CMLL Día de Muertos (2020) (Spanish for "Day of the Dead") was a professional wrestling supercard event, scripted and produced by the Mexican lucha libre promotion Consejo Mundial de Lucha Libre (CMLL), held to celebrate the Mexican Day of the Dead celebration. The shows took place on October 30, 2020, in CMLL's main venue, Arena México, in Mexico City, Mexico. Traditionally, several wrestlers will wear the traditional Día de Muertos face and body paint for the event. From around the mid-point of each show, the losing wrestlers will be dragged to El Inframundo ("The Underworld"; in actuality, a side entrance in the arena) by a group of wrestlers dressed up as minions of the ruler of the underworld. This will be the seventh year that CMLL celebrates the Día de Muertos in such a manner.

Sansón was meant to defend the Rey del Inframundo ("King of the Underworld") championship that he won at the 2017 Día de Muertos show and successfully defended on the 2018 and 2019 shows. However, he tested positive for COVID-19 and the championship was vacated. El Terrible defeated Euforia to win the vacant championship.

== Production ==
=== Background ===
The October 31, 2014 Día de Muertos show was the first of Mexican professional wrestling promotion Consejo Mundial de Lucha Libre's Dia de los Muertos ("Day of the Dead") celebrations in 2014 and began a tradition of CMLL holding a major show to celebrate the Latin American holiday. As part of their Dia de los Muerte celebrations CMLL admitted all children in costumes for free for the show. CMLL held a second Dia de los Muerte celebration on Sunday November 2 as well. Both shows included the Edcanes, CMLL's ring girls and various wrestlers dressed up in traditional Día de Muertos garb. In 2014, CMLL also turned the basement of Arena México into a haunted house attraction before each show. CMLL has held one or more shows to celebrate the holiday annually since 2014, with 2020 marking the seventh year in a row.

=== Storylines ===
The 2020 Día de Muertos shows featured a number professional wrestling matches scripted by CMLL with some wrestlers involved in scripted feuds. Wrestlers portray either heels (referred to as rudos in Mexico, those that play the part of the "bad guys") or faces (técnicos in Mexico, the "good guy" characters) as they perform.

At the 2017 Día de Muertos show, Sansón outlasted El Cuatrero, Diamante Azul, Forastero, Hechicero, Místico, Soberano Jr. and Valiente in a torneo cibernetico elimination match to become the first ever Rey del Inframundo ("King of the Underworld"). While Sansón was given a championship belt to symbolize his victory it is not a championship, but a tournament trophy that is not defended outside of the annual tournament in the vein of CMLL's Leyenda de Plata or Leyenda de Azul tournaments. In 2018, Sansón successfully defended the Rey del Inframundo championship against Templario. In 2019, Sansón defended the Rey del Inframundo championship for a second time as he defeated Star Jr.

== Matches ==
No.	Resultsyes	Stipulations	Times
1	Chamuel and Guapito defeated Atomo and Microman	Best two-out-of-three falls tag team match	12:24
2	Audaz, Espíritu Negro and Rey Cometa defeated Dark Magic, Okumura and Vangellys	Best two-out-of-three falls six-man tag team match	13:37
3	Reyna Isis (c) defeated Lluvia	Best two-out-of-three falls Singles match for the Mexican National Women's Championship	16:12
4	Ángel de Oro, Forastero and Niebla Roja defeated El Soberano Jr., Negro Casas and Titán	Best two-out-of-three falls six-man tag team match	24:09
5	El Terrible defeated Euforia	Best two-out-of-three falls match for the CMLL Rey del Inframundo Championship	19:31
(c) / – the champion(s) heading into the match
