= CMLL Día de Muertos =

Mexican wrestling shows

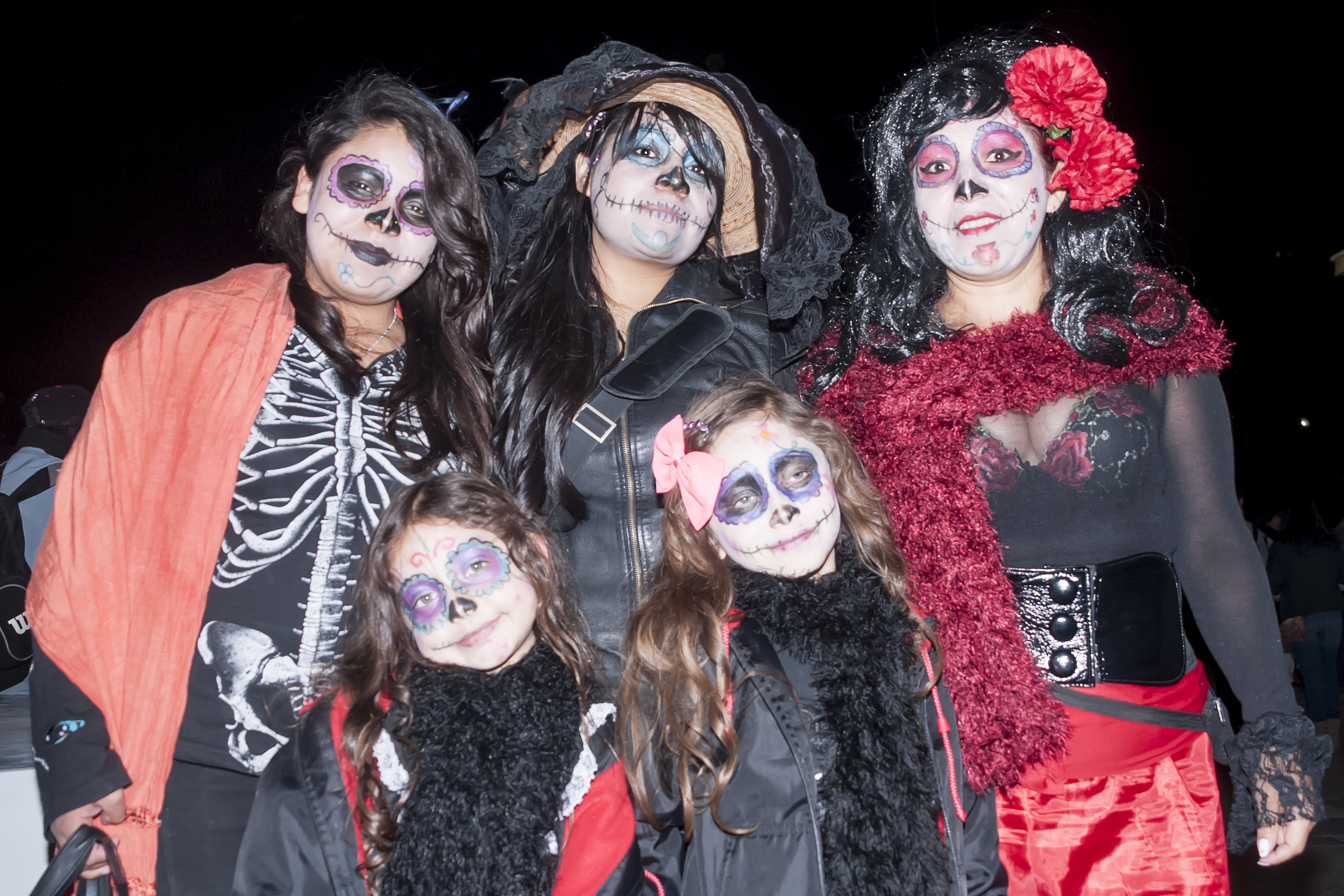
Several wrestlers and CMLL ring girls wear the traditional Calavera face paint during the shows.

CMLL Día de Muertos (Spanish for "Day of the Dead") is the collective name of a series of annually occurring lucha libre (or professional wrestling) supercard shows promoted by Mexican professional wrestling promotion Consejo Mundial de Lucha Libre (CMLL). Starting in 2014, CMLL has held specially themed shows to celebrate Día de Muertos with a special edition of their CMLL Super Viernes show closest to November 2. Some years the celebrations extended to shows held on Saturday and Sunday as well but the focal point has been the Friday night shows in Arena México. There has been a total of eleven events promoted focusing on the Día de Muertos celebration, with the first taking place in 2014.

The October 31, 2014 Día de Muertos show was the first of CMLL's Dia de los Muertos celebrations and began a tradition of CMLL holding a major show to celebrate the Latin American holiday. As part of their Dia de los Muerte celebrations CMLL admitted all children in costumes for free for the show. CMLL held a second Dia de los Muerte celebration on Sunday November 2 as well. Both shows included the Edcanes, CMLL's ring girls and various wrestlers dressed up in traditional Día de Muertos garb. In 2014, CMLL also turned the basement of Arena México into a haunted house attraction before each show.

== Dates, venues, and main events ==
Event	Date	City	Venue	Main Event	Ref(s).
2014	October 31	Mexico City	Arena México	Último Guerrero vs. Rush	
2015	October 30	Mexico City	Arena México	Volador Jr. vs. La Sombra for the NWA World Historic Welterweight Championship	
2016	October 29	Mexico City	Arena México	Valiente vs. Volador Jr. for the 2016 Universal Championship	
2017	November 3	Mexico City	Arena México	Carístico, Rush and Volador Jr. vs. Los Guerreros Laguneros (Euforia, Gran Guerrero and Último Guerrero)	
2018	November 2	Mexico City	Arena México	Diamante Azul, L. A. Park and Michael Elgin vs. King Phoenix, Penta 0M and Último Guerrero in a six-man Relevos increíbles match	
2019	November 1	Mexico City	Arena México	La Alianza de Plata y Oro (Carístico and Místico) vs. Los Guerreros Lagunero (Euforia and Gran Guerrero) (c) for the CMLL World Tag Team Championship	
2019	November 3	Mexico City	Arena México	Nueva Generacion Dinamitas (El Cuatrero and Forastero) and Gran Guerrero vs. Carístico, Místico and Soberano Jr.	
2020	October 30	Mexico City	Arena México	El Terrible vs. Euforia for the vacant CMLL Rey del Inframundo Championship	
2021	November 2	Mexico City	Arena México	Felino vs. Místico vs. Volador Jr. vs. Valiente vs. Ángel de Oro vs. Gran Guerrero vs. Templario vs. Atlantis Jr. vs. Gemelo Diablo I vs. Gemelo Diablo II	
2021	November 5	Mexico City	Arena México	El Terrible vs. Atlantis Jr. for the CMLL Rey del Inframundo Championship	
2022	November 4	Mexico City	Arena México	El Terrible vs. Stuka Jr. for the CMLL Rey del Inframundo Championship	
2023	November 3	Mexico City	Arena México	Stuka Jr. vs. El Barbaro Cavernario for the CMLL Rey del Inframundo Championship	
2024	November 1	Mexico City	Arena México	Los Depredadores (Magia Blanca, Rugido & Volador Jr.) vs. Esfinge, Mistico & Neon	
2025	October 31	Mexico City	Arena México	El Sky Team (Mascara Dorada, Mistico & Neon) vs. Barbaro Cavernario, Hechicero & Volador Jr.	
2026	October 30	Mexico City	Arena México	Guerrero Maya Jr. vs. Xelhua vs. Calavera Jr. I vs. Rafaga Jr. for the CMLL Rey del Inframundo Championship	
(c) – refers to the champion(s) heading into the match
