= CMLL Día de Muertos (2014) =

Mexican professional wrestling supercard show

- Official poster for CMLL's Day of the Dead celebration
- Promotion: Consejo Mundial de Lucha Libre
- Date: October 31, 2014
- City: Mexico City, Mexico
- Venue: Arena México

Event chronology
← Previous; La Copa Junior VIP	Next → Infierno en el Ring

CMLL Día de Muertos chronology
← Previous; First	Next → 2015

CMLL Super Viernes chronology
← Previous; October 24, 2014	Next → November 7, 2014

The CMLL Día de Muertos (2014) (Spanish for "Day of the Dead") was a professional wrestling supercard event, scripted and produced by the Mexican Lucha Libre promotion Consejo Mundial de Lucha Libre (CMLL). The show took place on October 31, 2014 in CMLL's main venue, Arena México, in Mexico City, Mexico and celebrated the Mexican Day of the Dead celebration. Many of the wrestlers working the show wore the traditional Día de Muertos face and body paint for the Día de Muerto event. From the fourth match on the losing wrestlers were dragged to El Inframundo ("The Underworld"), a side entrance in the arena, by a group of wrestlers dressed up as minions of the ruler of the underworld.

The main event was a best two-out-of-three falls match between Rush and Último Guerrero. CMLL rarely books singles matches for their main events unless they are for a championship or a Lucha de Apuestas match ("Bet match"). In this case CMLL was pushing the rivalry between Rush's group Los Ingobernables and Guerrero's group Los Guerreros Lagunero that had been building for several weeks further into the spotlight, making it more than being merely about the CMLL World Trios Championship that Los Guerreros Lagunero held. In the fourth match of the night the remaining Ingobernables (La Máscara and La Sombra) and Guerreros Lagunero (Euforia and Gran Guerrero) were on opposite sides of a six-man "Lucha Libre rules" tag team match; Los Ingobernables will team up with Stuka Jr. while Los Guerreros Lagunero teamed up with Pólvora.

== Production ==
The October 31, 2014 Día de Muertos show was the first of Mexican professional wrestling promotion Consejo Mundial de Lucha Libre's Dia de los Muertos ("Day of the Dead") celebrations in 2014 and began a tradition of CMLL holding a major show to celebrate the Latin American holiday. As part of their Dia de los Muerte celebrations CMLL admitted all kids in costumes for free for the show. CMLL held a second Dia de los Muerte celebration on Sunday November 2 as well. Both shows included the Edcanes, CMLL's ring girls and various wrestlers dressed up in traditional Día de Muertos garb. In 2014, CMLL also turned the basement of Arena México into a haunted house attraction before each show.

== Event ==
The 2014 Dia de Muertos show featured six professional wrestling matches scripted by CMLL with some wrestlers involved in scripted feuds. Wrestlers portray either heels (referred to as rudos in Mexico, those that play the part of the "bad guys") or faces (técnicos in Mexico, the "good guy" characters) as they perform.

At the opening of the show CMLL's Edcanes (Ring girls) were introduced, with half of them in face and body paint resembling the Calavera figure that is associated with the Dia de los Muertos celebration and half of them dressed and painted to resemble demons of the underground. Throughout the show the demonic Edcanes and select Rudo wrestlers all acted on instructions from someone dressed as King Mictlantecuhtli, the Aztec lord of the underground, and would carry off the losing wrestlers to the "underworld", or in this case one of the side exits at Arena México. Throughout the nights the various masked Rudo wrestlers wore masks that where half their normal mask and half a demonic, evil mask while the unmasked wrestlers had their face and body painted to resemble skeletons. In the opening match the team of Los Hombres del Camoflaje ("Men in Camouflage"; Artillero and Súper Comando) defeated Hombre Bala Jr. and Super Halcón Jr. two falls to one, after which the losing side were the first wrestlers "condemned to the underground" by King Mictlantecuhtli.

After the fifth match of the night Diamante Azul and Thunder kept fighting until they were interrupted by the surprise appearance of L.A. Park and his son El Hijo de L.A. Park. Park made his return to CMLL after last working for them in 2008 and immediately challenged anyone in CMLL to a fight. After no one stepped forward L.A. Park and his son returned to the back. Before the main event King Mictlantecuhtli was unmasked to reveal that Último Guerrero had been commanding the underworld arm throughout the night, Guerrero would reprise the role two days later on CMLL's Sunday night show. In previous weeks Guerrero had been on the receiving end of a low blow from Rush, but on the night Guerrero demonstrated why for a long time he has been considered the top rudo wrestler in CMLL as he won the third and deciding fall of a hard fought match by landing a low blow on Rush. Unlike Rush though Guerrero made sure the referee did not witness the rule breaking and instead pinned his opponent to win the match. Following the match Rush made angry challenges at Último Guerrero, including a challenge to defend the CMLL World Trios Championship against his team at an undetermined date in the future.

== Aftermath ==
On November 6, it was announced that L.A. Park was not joining CMLL, but was at the event to promote a partnership between CMLL and the new independent "Liga Elite" promotion.

== Results ==
No.	Results	Stipulations
1	Los Hombres del Camoflaje (Artillero and Súper Comando) defeated Hombre Bala Jr. and Super Halcón Jr.	Tag Team Best two-out-of-three falls match
2	Boby Zavala and Los Cancerberos del Infierno (Raziel and Virus) defeated Dragon Lee, Pegasso and Tritón	Six-man "Lucha Libre rules" tag team match
3	Máximo, Rey Cometa and Titán defeated Hechicero and La Peste Negra (Bárbaro Cavernario and El Felino)	Six-man "Lucha Libre rules" tag team match
4	Pólvora and Los Guerreros Laguneros (Euforia and Gran Guerrero) defeated Stuka Jr. and Los Ingobernables (La Máscara and La Sombra) by disqualification	Six-man "Lucha Libre rules" tag team match
5	Thunder and La Peste Negra (Mr. Niebla and Negro Casas) defeated Atlantis, Diamante Azul and Volador Jr.	Six-man "Lucha Libre rules" tag team match
6	Último Guerrero defeated Rush	Best two-out-of-three falls match
