= CMLL Día de Muertos (2015) =

Mexican professional wrestling supercard show

- Official poster for CMLL's Day of the Dead celebration
- Promotion: Consejo Mundial de Lucha Libre
- Date: October 30, 2015
- City: Mexico City, Mexico
- Venue: Arena México

Event chronology
← Previous; Universal Championship	Next → Infierno en el Ring

CMLL Día de Muertos chronology
← Previous; 2014	Next → 2016

The CMLL Día de Muertos (2015) (Spanish for "Day of the Dead") was a professional wrestling pay-per-view (PPV), scripted and produced by the Mexican Lucha Libre promotion Consejo Mundial de Lucha Libre (CMLL). The show took place on October 30, 2015 in CMLL's main venue, Arena México, in Mexico City, Mexico and celebrated the Mexican Day of the Dead celebration. Many of the wrestlers working the show wore the traditional Día de Muertos face and body paint for the Día de Muerto event. From the fourth match on the losing wrestlers were dragged to El Inframundo ("The Underworld"), a side entrance in the arena, by a group of wrestlers dressed up as minions of the ruler of the underworld.

In the main event of the show Volador Jr. successfully defended the NWA World Historic Welterweight Championship against long time rival La Sombra, in what turned out to be La Sombra's last major CMLL show appearance before joining WWE. The show featured five additional matches.

== Production ==
=== Background ===
The October 31, 2014 Día de Muertos show was the first of Mexican professional wrestling promotion Consejo Mundial de Lucha Libre's Dia de los Muertos ("Day of the Dead") celebrations in 2014 and began a tradition of CMLL holding a major show to celebrate the Latin American holiday. As part of their Dia de los Muerte celebrations CMLL admitted all kids in costumes for free for the show. CMLL held a second Dia de los Muerte celebration on Sunday November 2 as well. Both shows included the Edcanes, CMLL's ring girls and various wrestlers dressed up in traditional Día de Muertos garb. In 2014, CMLL also turned the basement of Arena México into a haunted house attraction before each show. CMLL has held one or more shows to celebrate the holiday annually since 2014, with 2015 marking the second year in a row.

=== Storylines ===
The 2015 Dia de Muertos show featured six professional wrestling matches scripted by CMLL with some wrestlers involved in scripted feuds. Wrestlers portray either heels (referred to as rudos in Mexico, those that play the part of the "bad guys") or faces (técnicos in Mexico, the "good guy" characters) as they perform.

== Matches ==
No.	Results	Stipulations	Times
1	Mercurio and Universito 2000 defeated Acero and Último Dragoncito	Best two-out-of-three falls tag team match	12:45
2	Esfinge, Oro Jr. and The Panther defeated Raziel, Skándalo and Súper Comando by disqualification	Best two-out-of-three falls six-man tag team match	10:30
3	La Amapola, Dalys la Caribeña, and Zeuxis defeated La Vaquerita, Marcela and Princesa Sugehit	Best two-out-of-three falls six-man tag team match	12:17
4	Boby Z, Dragón Rojo Jr. and Thunder defeated Euforia, Gran Guerrero, and Mr. Niebla	Best two-out-of-three falls six-man tag team match	12:12
5	Los Ingobernables (La Máscara, Marco Corleone, and Rush) defeated Máximo Sexy, Super Parka and Valiente	Best two-out-of-three falls six-man tag team match	10:55
6	Volador Jr. (C) defeated La Sombra	Best two-out-of-three falls match for the NWA World Historic Welterweight Championship	24:59
