= CMLL Día de Muertos (2019) =

Major Mexican professional wrestling show

- Promotion: Consejo Mundial de Lucha Libre
- Date: November 1, 2019; November 3, 2019
- City: Mexico City, Mexico
- Venue: Arena México

Event chronology
← Previous; Torneo Gran Alternativa	Next → Leyendas Mexicanas

Día de Muertos chronology
← Previous; 2018	Next → 2020

The 2019 CMLL Día de Muertos was a lineup of two professional wrestling supercard events, scripted and produced by the Mexican Lucha Libre promotion Consejo Mundial de Lucha Libre (CMLL). The shows were held on November 1 and November 3, 2019, at Arena México, in Mexico City, Mexico, as the CMLL’s sixth annual celebration of the Mexican Day of the Dead. Many of the wrestlers working the shows wore traditional Día de Muertos face and body paint for the event. The losing wrestlers from each show were taken to El Inframundo ("The Underworld"; a side entrance in the arena) by a group of wrestlers dressed up as minions of the ruler of the underworld.

As part of the shows, Sansón defended the Rey del Inframundo ("King of the Underworld") championship that he won at the 2017 Día de Muertos show and successfully defended on the 2018 show. The November 3 show featured a singles match between Micro-Estrellas Microman and Chamuel.

== Production ==
=== Background ===
Consejo Mundial de Lucha Libre held its inaugural Día de Muertos show on October 31, 2014. As part of the promotion campaign, children in costumes were admitted to the show for free. They held a second event on November 2, 2014. Both included their ring girls, known as Edcanes, and various wrestlers dressed in traditional Día de Muertos garb. They also held a haunted house attraction in the basement of Arena México before each show. CMLL has held shows to celebrate the holiday annually since then, making 2019 the sixth year.

=== Storylines ===
The 2019 Dia de Muertos shows featured twelve professional wrestling matches scripted by CMLL, with the wrestlers each portraying either heels or faces as they performed. The show starred the Mexican god of death, Amotlamini, portrayed by a young wrestler named Retro, who directed his underlings throughout the show.

At the 2017 Día de Muertos show, Sansón outlasted El Cuatrero, Diamante Azul, Forastero, Hechicero, Mistico, Soberano Jr., and Valiente in a torneo cibernetico elimination match to become the first-ever Rey del Inframundo ("King of the Underworld"). Sansón was given a championship belt as a tournament trophy, which is not defended outside of the Dia de Muertos tournament.

The following year, at the 2018 Día de Muertos show, Sansón successfully defended the Rey del Inframundo championship against Templario. On October 18, CMLL announced that Sansón would be defending the Rey del Inframundo title on the November 1 show, with the challenger to be determined by an elimination match held on October 29. CMLL later announced the 10 wrestlers who would compete in the torneo cibernetic: Rey Cometa, Universo 2000 Jr., Audaz, Disturbio, Dulce Gardenia, Pólvora, Star Jr., Tiger, Black Panther, and Virus.

During the press conference, CMLL announced that the Micro-Estrellas Microman and Chamuel would face off on the November 3 Día de Muertos show, continuing their existing feud that saw Microman defeat and unmask Chamuel at the CMLL 86th Anniversary Show.

== Results ==
=== November 1 ===
No.	Results	Stipulations
1	Akuma and Espanto Jr. defeated Magnus and Príncipe Diamante	Best two-out-of-three falls tag team match
2	Dalys, La Metálica, and Reyna Isis defeated La Jarochita, Lluvia, and Princesa Sugehit	Best two-out-of-three falls six-woman tag team match
3	Atlantis Jr., Flyer, and Fugaz defeated Hechicero, El Hijo del Villano III, and Templario	Best two-out-of-three falls six-man tag team match
4	Sansón (c) defeated Star Jr.	Best two-out-of-three falls match for the CMLL Rey del Inframundo Championship
5	Bárbaro Cavernario, Negro Casas, and Último Guerrero defeated Ángel de Oro, Niebla Roja, and Stuka Jr.	Best two-out-of-three falls six-man tag team match
6	La Alianza de Plata y Oro (Carístico and Místico) defeated Los Guerreros Lagunero (Euforia and Gran Guerrero) (c)	Best two-out-of-three falls tag team match for the CMLL World Tag Team Championship
(c) / – the champion(s) heading into the match

=== November 3 ===
No.	Results	Stipulations
1	Fantasy and Kaligua defeated Pequeño Universo 2000 and Pequeño Violencia	Best two-out-of-three falls tag team match
2	Estrellita, Sanely, and Silueta defeated La Comandante, La Infernal, and La Seductora	Best two-out-of-three falls six-woman tag team match
3	Átomo, El Gallito, and Microman defeated Chamuel, El Guapito, and Perico Zakarías	Best two-out-of-three falls six-man tag team match
4	El Hijo del Villano III defeated Guerrero Maya Jr. by disqualification	Lighting Match, one fall, 10 minute time limit singles match
5	Diamante Azul, Dulce Gardenia, and Valiente defeated Los Hijos del Infierno (Ephesto, Luciferno, and Mephisto)	Best two-out-of-three falls six-man tag team match
6	Nueva Generacion Dinamitas (El Cuatrero and Forastero), and Gran Guerrero defeated Carístico, Místico, and Soberano Jr.	Best two-out-of-three falls six-man tag team match
