= Torneo Gran Alternativa (2007) =

Mexican professional wrestling tournament

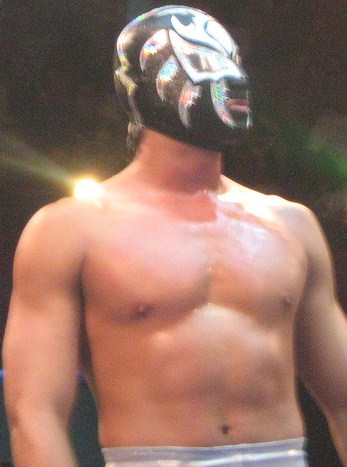
- La Sombra, the 2007 rookie winner of the Gran Alternativa
- Promotion: Consejo Mundial de Lucha Libre
- Date: June 29, 2007
- City: Mexico City, Mexico
- Venue: Arena México

Event chronology
← Previous; Leyenda de Plata	Next → Pequeños Reyes del Aire

CMLL Torneo Gran Alternativa chronology
← Previous; 2006	Next → 2008

The Torneo Gran Alternativa (2007) (Spanish for "Great Alternative Tournament") was the first CMLL Torneo Gran Alternativa professional wrestling tournament held by the Mexican professional wrestling promotion Consejo Mundial de Lucha Libre (CMLL; Spanish for "World Wrestling Council"). The tournament was held on June 29, 2007, in Mexico City, Mexico at CMLL's main venue, Arena México. The Gran Alternativa tournament features tag teams composed of a rookie, or novato, and a veteran wrestler for an elimination tournament. The idea is to feature the novato wrestlers higher on the card that they usually work and help elevate one or more up the ranks. CMLL made the Torneo Gran Alternativa an annual event in 1995, only skipping it four times between 1994 and 2017. since it is a professional wrestling tournament, it is not won or lost competitively but instead by the decisions of the bookers of a wrestling promotion that is not publicized prior to the shows to maintain the illusion that professional wrestling is a competitive sport.

The 2007 Gran Alternativa tournament was the 13th overall tournament held. Veteran Último Guerrero and rookie Euforia qualified for the finals by defeating Villaño V and Super Comando in the first round and Dos Caras Jr. and Valiente in the second round. 2004 winner Místico teamed with rookie La Sombra to defeat Marco Corleone and Flash in the first round, then Dr. Wagner Jr. and Máscara Purpura, before toppling Guerrero and Euforia in the finals, making Místico the first rookie winner to also win the Gran Alternativa as a veteran. Soon after his tournament victory, La Sombra teamed with El Sagrado and Volador Jr. to win the Mexican National Trios Championship as well as holding one-half of the CMLL World Tag Team Championship with Volador Jr.

== History ==
Starting in 1994 the Mexican professional wrestling promotion Consejo Mundial de Lucha Libre (CMLL) created a special tournament concept where they would team up a novato, or rookie, with a veteran for a single-elimination tag team tournament with the purpose of increasing the profile of the rookie wrestler.

CMLL had used a similar concept in August 1994 where Novato Shocker teamed up with veterans Ringo Mendoza and Brazo de Plata to defeat novato Apolo Dantés and veterans Gran Markus Jr. and El Brazo in the finals of a six-man tag team tournament. CMLL would later modify the concept to two-man tag teams instead, creating a tournament that would be known as El Torneo Gran Alternativa, or "The Great Alternative Tournament", which became a recurring event on the CMLL calendar. CMLL did not hold a Gran Alternativa tournament in 1997 and 2000, but held on each year from 2001 through 2007.

== Tournament brackets ==
Quarterfinals
Stuka Jr. and Negro Casas
Máscara Purpura and Dr. Wagner Jr.	W
Super Nova and Heavy Metal
La Sombra and Místico	W
Flash and Marco Corleone
Valiente and Dos Caras Jr.	W
Euforia and Último Guerrero	W
Super Comando and Villaño V

Semifinals
Máscara Purpura and Dr. Wagner Jr.
La Sombra and Místico	W
Valiente and Dos Caras Jr.
Euforia and Último Guerrero	W

Finals
La Sombra and Místico	W
Euforia and Último Guerrero

== Aftermath ==
La Sombra, teaming with El Sagrado and Volador Jr., would go on to win the Mexican National Trios Championship following his Gran Alternativa tournament win. He would later also hold the CMLL World Tag Team Championship team with Volador Jr., the CMLL World Trios Championship with Máscara Dorada and La Máscara, the NWA World Welterweight Championship and NWA World Historic Middleweight Championship once, and then NWA World Historic Welterweight Championship twice. In 2015 La Sombra lost his mask to Atlantis in the main event of the CMLL 82nd Anniversary Show, after which he revealed that he had signed a contract with WWE, the largest wrestling promotion in the world.
