= Road Rager (2022) =

All Elite Wrestling two-part television special

- Promotion: All Elite Wrestling
- Date: June 15, 2022 (aired June 15, 2022 and June 17, 2022)
- City: St. Louis, Missouri
- Venue: Chaifetz Arena
- Attendance: 4,731

Event chronology
← Previous; 2021	Next → Final

AEW Dynamite special episodes chronology
← Previous; Dynamite 3 Year Anniversary	Next → Blood & Guts

AEW Rampage special episodes chronology
← Previous; Slam Dunk	Next → Royal Rampage

The 2022 Road Rager was the second annual and final Road Rager professional wrestling television special produced by All Elite Wrestling (AEW). It was held on June 15, 2022, in St. Louis, Missouri at the Chaifetz Arena, encompassing the broadcasts of AEW's weekly television programs, Wednesday Night Dynamite, which aired live on TBS, and Friday Night Rampage, which aired on tape delay on June 17 on TNT. The 2022 event expanded upon the previous year, which was only held as a special episode of Dynamite. This would be the final Road Rager as an event was not held in 2023.

== Production ==
Other on-screen personnel
Role	Name
Commentators	Jim Ross (Dynamite)
Commentators	Excalibur (both shows)
Commentators	Tony Schiavone (Dynamite)
Commentators	Taz (Rampage)
Commentators	Chris Jericho (Rampage)
Commentators	William Regal (Hair vs. Hair & Moxley vs Garcia)
Commentators	Stokely Hathaway (TBS Title match)
Ring announcer	Dasha Gonzalez
Referees	Aubrey Edwards
Referees	Bryce Remsburg
Referees	Paul Turner
Referees	Rick Knox
Referees	Stephon Smith
Interviewers	Lexy Nair
Interviewers	Mark Henry

=== Storylines ===
Road Rager featured professional wrestling matches that involved different wrestlers from pre-existing scripted feuds and storylines. Wrestlers portrayed heroes, villains, or less distinguishable characters in scripted events that built tension and culminated in a wrestling match or series of matches. Storylines were produced on AEW's weekly television program, Dynamite, the supplementary online streaming shows, Dark and Elevation, and The Young Bucks' YouTube series Being The Elite.

== Reception ==
=== Television ratings ===
Dynamite averaged 761,000 television viewers on TBS and a 0.28 rating in the 18-49 demographic, AEW's key demographic. This was down from the 939,000 viewership total of the previous week's episode.

Rampage averaged 331,000 television viewers on TNT, with a 0.10 rating in the 18-49 demographic. This was also down from the 476,000 viewership total of the previous week.

== Results ==
=== Dynamite (aired June 15) ===
No.	Results	Stipulations	Times
1	Chris Jericho defeated Ortiz by pinfall	Hair vs. Hair match	11:45
2	Wardlow defeated 20 Plaintiffs (with Mark Sterling)	20-on-1 Handicap match	4:09
3	Will Ospreay defeated Dax Harwood by pinfall	Singles match	13:40
4	Miro defeated Ethan Page (with Dan Lambert) by submission	AEW All-Atlantic Championship Tournament Semifinals	9:25
5	Toni Storm defeated Dr. Britt Baker, D.M.D. (with Jamie Hayter and Rebel) by pinfall	Singles match	7:35
6	The Young Bucks (Matt Jackson and Nick Jackson) defeated Jurassic Express (Jungle Boy and Luchasaurus) (c)	Tag team ladder match for the AEW World Tag Team Championship	14:50
(c) / – the champion(s) heading into the match

=== Rampage (aired June 17) ===
No.	Results	Stipulations	Times
1	Jon Moxley (with William Regal) defeated Dante Martin by submission	Singles match	11:58
2	Gunn Club (Austin Gunn and Colten Gunn) and Max Caster (with Billy Gunn and Anthony Bowens) defeated Ruffin It (Leon Ruff and Bear Country (Bear Beefcake and Bear Bronson)) by pinfall	Six-man tag team match	1:16
3	Jade Cargill (c) (with Stokely Hathaway) defeated Willow Nightingale by pinfall	Singles match for the AEW TBS Championship	6:04
4	Darby Allin defeated Bobby Fish by pinfall	Singles match	11:48
(c) / – the champion(s) heading into the match
