= CMLL Universal Championship (2015) =

Mexican professional wrestling tournament

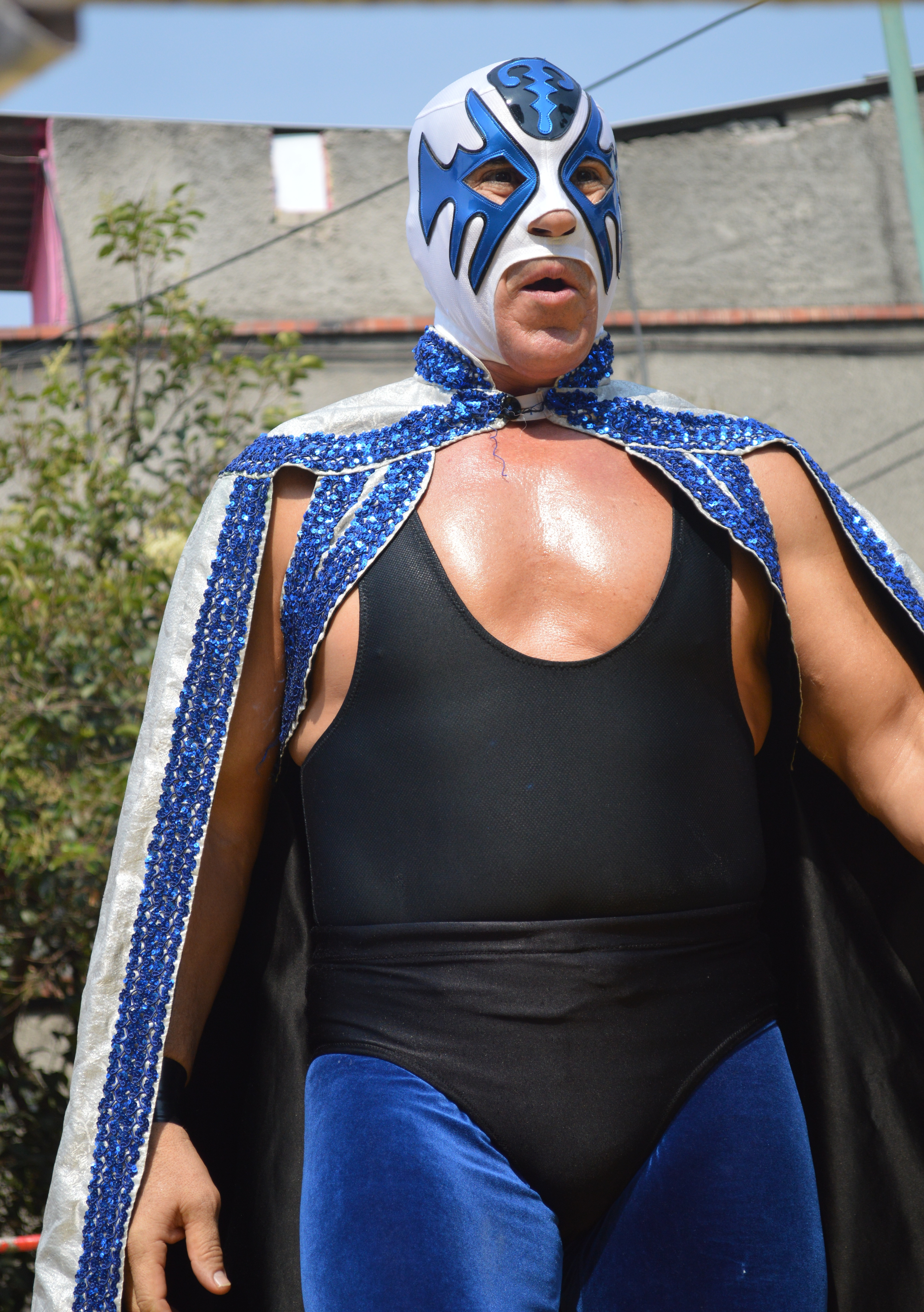
- Atlantis, holder of the Mexican National Light Heavyweight Championship and tournament winner.
- Promotion: Consejo Mundial de Lucha Libre
- Date: October 2, 2015 to October 16, 2015
- City: Mexico City, Mexico
- Venue: Arena México

Event chronology
← Previous; CMLL 82nd Anniversary Show	Next → Día de Muertos

CMLL Universal Championship tournaments chronology
← Previous; 2014	Next → 2016

The CMLL Universal Championship 2015 (Campeonato Universal in Spanish) is an ongoing professional wrestling tournament, originally announced by the Consejo Mundial de Lucha Libre (CMLL) promotion as starting in August 2015. CMLL started the tournament in October, with no explanation for the change to the schedule. Traditionally the Universal Championship tournament takes place over three Super Viernes. The CMLL Universal Championship is an annual tournament of CMLL champions that was first held in 2009, making the 2015 version the seventh overall tournament. Being a professional wrestling tournament, it is not won legitimately; it is instead won via predetermined outcomes to the matches that is kept secret from the general public.

== Background ==
The tournament will feature 15 professional wrestling matches under single-elimination tournament rules, which means that wrestlers would be eliminated from the tournament when they lose a match. All male "non-regional" CMLL champions at the time of the tournament are eligible to participate in the tournament. The CMLL World Mini-Estrella Championship and Mexican National Lightweight Championship are both exclusively for CMLL's Mini-Estrella division and thus not eligible for the tournament. Regionally promoted championships such as the CMLL Arena Coliseo Tag Team Championship and the Occidente championships promoted in Guadalajara, Jalisco have not been included in the tournament in the past; only titles that have been defended in CMLL's main venue Arena Mexico were included, although exceptions have been made to allow New Japan Pro-Wrestling (NJPW) champions to compete if they were in Mexico at the time. At the time of the tournament being announced CMLL World Welterweight Champion Máscara Dorada was working full-time for NJPW, which meant he would not participate in the tournament.

== 2015 Universal Championship tournament ==
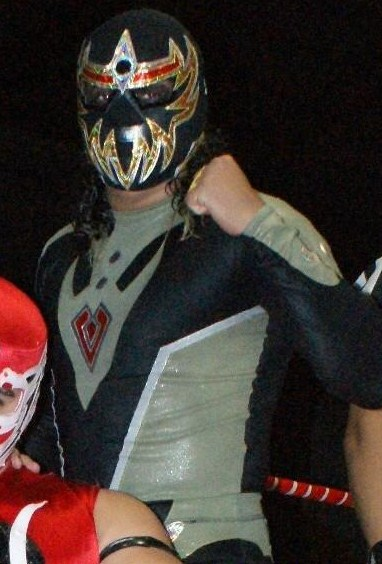
Máscara Dorada, the current CMLL World Welterweight Champion, only champion not in the tournament.

Block A (October 2, 2015)

Participant	Championship held	'Ref.
Ángel de Oro	CMLL World Light Heavyweight Championship	
Bárbaro Cavernario	Mexican National Welterweight Championship	
Dragon Lee	CMLL World Lightweight Championship	
Dragón Rojo, Jr.	CMLL World Middleweight Championship	
Luciferno	Mexican National Trios Championship	
Rey Bucanero	NWA World Historic Light Heavyweight Championship	
Shocker	CMLL World Tag Team Championship	
Último Guerrero	NWA World Historic Middleweight Championship	

Block B (October 9, 2015)

Participant	Championship held	'Ref.
Atlantis	Mexican National Light Heavyweight Championship	
Negro Casas	CMLL World Tag Team Championship	
Ephesto	Mexican National Trios Championship	
Máximo	CMLL World Heavyweight Championship	
Mephisto	Mexican National Trios Championship	
Místico	CMLL World Trios Championship	
Valiente	CMLL World Trios Championship	
Volador Jr.	CMLL World Trios Championship; NWA World Historic Welterweight Championship	

=== Tournament brackets ===
Block A

Quarterfinals
Último Guerrero	Pin
Rey Bucanero
Dragón Rojo Jr.
Bárbaro Cavernario	Pin
Dragon Lee	Pin
Luciferno
Ángel de Oro	Pin
Shocker

Semifinals
Último Guerrero	Pin
Bárbaro Cavernario
Luciferno
Shocker	Pin

Finals
Último Guerrero	Pin
Shocker

Block B

Quarterfinals
Ephesto	Pin
Mephisto
Místico	Pin
Valiente
Volador Jr.	Pin
Maximo
Negro Casas
Atlantis	Pin

Semifinals
Mephisto	Pin
Místico
Volador Jr.
Atlantis	Pin

Finals
Mephisto
Atlantis	Pin

Atlantis def. Ultimo Guerrero in the Finals to win the Tournament.
