= Road Rager (2021) =

All Elite Wrestling television special

- Promotional poster featuring various AEW wrestlers
- Promotion: All Elite Wrestling
- Date: July 7, 2021
- City: Miami, Florida
- Venue: James L. Knight Center
- Attendance: 3,738

Road Rager chronology
← Previous; First	Next → 2022

AEW Dynamite special episodes chronology
← Previous; Blood & Guts	Next → Fyter Fest

The 2021 Road Rager was the inaugural Road Rager professional wrestling television special produced by All Elite Wrestling (AEW). It was held on July 7, 2021, in Miami, Florida at the James L. Knight Center and was broadcast live on TNT as a special episode of AEW's weekly television program, Dynamite. The event marked AEW's resumption of live touring during the COVID-19 pandemic, following a year of producing shows at Daily's Place in Jacksonville, Florida, also becoming the first major wrestling promotion to resume live touring during the pandemic. As such, it was the first of four episodes in AEW's "Welcome Back" tour. At the time, it was the largest attended wrestling event during the pandemic outside of WWE's WrestleMania 37 in April and AEW's own Double or Nothing in May.

Five matches were contested at the event. In the main event, The Young Bucks (Matt Jackson and Nick Jackson) defeated Eddie Kingston and Penta El Zero Miedo in a Street Fight to retain the AEW World Tag Team Championship. In other prominent matches, Andrade El Idolo (making his AEW in-ring debut) defeated Matt Sydal and The Pinnacle (Wardlow, Dax Harwood, and Cash Wheeler) defeated The Inner Circle (Jake Hager, Santana and Ortiz). The event was also notable for the AEW debut appearance of Malakai Black, formerly Aleister Black in WWE.

== Production ==
Other on-screen personnel
Role	Name
Commentators	Jim Ross
Commentators	Excalibur
Commentators	Tony Schiavone
Commentators	Don Callis (Main event)
Ring announcer	Justin Roberts
Referees	Aubrey Edwards
Referees	Bryce Remsburg
Referees	Mike Posey
Referees	Paul Turner
Referees	Rick Knox

=== Background ===
Due to the COVID-19 pandemic that began effecting the industry in mid-March 2020, All Elite Wrestling (AEW) held the majority of their programs from Daily's Place in Jacksonville, Florida; these events were originally held without fans, but the company began running shows at 10–15% capacity in August, gradually increasing as time went on, before eventually running full capacity shows in May 2021. Also in May, AEW announced that they would be returning to live touring, beginning with a special episode of Dynamite titled Road Rager on July 7, in turn becoming the first major professional wrestling promotion to resume live touring during the pandemic. Road Rager was announced to be held in Miami, Florida at the James L. Knight Center and was the first of a four-week span of special Dynamite episodes as part of AEW's "Welcome Back" tour, which continued with the two-part Fyter Fest on July 14 and 21 and concluded with Fight for the Fallen on July 28.

=== Storylines ===
Road Rager featured professional wrestling matches that involved different wrestlers from pre-existing scripted feuds and storylines. Wrestlers portrayed heroes, villains, or less distinguishable characters in scripted events that built tension and culminated in a wrestling match or series of matches. Storylines were produced on AEW's weekly television program, Dynamite, the supplementary online streaming shows, Dark and Elevation, and The Young Bucks' YouTube series Being The Elite.

== Reception ==
Dave Meltzer of the Wrestling Observer Newsletter reported that AEW had initially only made 1,200 tickets available, which was when stricter COVID-19 restrictions were still in place. However, after those initial tickets sold out, AEW increased available tickets to 3,500; the venue has a maximum capacity of around 4,800. PWInsider later reported that AEW were a few hundred tickets short of a full sell out. Despite not fully selling out, Meltzer said that Road Rager was still the largest attended wrestling event during the pandemic up to that point outside of WWE's WrestleMania 37 in April and AEW's own Double or Nothing in May.

=== Television ratings ===
Road Rager averaged 871,000 television viewers on TNT and a 0.33 rating in AEW's key demographic. This was down from the previous week's Fan Appreciation Night.

== Results ==
No.	Results	Stipulations	Times
1	Cody Rhodes (with Arn Anderson) defeated Q. T. Marshall (with The Factory (Nick Comoroto and Aaron Solo))	South Beach Strap match Match could only be won by touching all four turnbuckles in succession.	10:40
2	The Pinnacle (Wardlow, Dax Harwood, and Cash Wheeler) (with Tully Blanchard) defeated The Inner Circle (Jake Hager, Santana and Ortiz) (with Konnan)	Six-man tag team match	10:00
3	Andrade El Ídolo (with Vickie Guerrero) defeated Matt Sydal	Singles match	6:00
4	Orange Cassidy and Kris Statlander defeated The Blade and The Bunny	Mixed tag team match	8:25
5	The Young Bucks (Matt Jackson and Nick Jackson) (c) (with Brandon Cutler) defeated Eddie Kingston and Penta El Zero Miedo	Street Fight for the AEW World Tag Team Championship	14:10
(c) / – the champion(s) heading into the match

== See also ==
- 2021 in professional wrestling
