= CMLL Día de Muertos (2016) =

Mexican professional wrestling show

- Official poster for CMLL's Day of the Dead celebration
- Promotion: Consejo Mundial de Lucha Libre
- Date: October 28, 2016
- City: Mexico City, Mexico
- Venue: Arena México

Event chronology
← Previous; Universal Championship	Next → Leyenda de Azul

CMLL Día de Muertos chronology
← Previous; 2015	Next → 2017

The CMLL Día de Muertos (2016) (Spanish for "Day of the Dead") is a professional wrestling supercard event, scripted and produced by the Mexican Lucha Libre promotion Consejo Mundial de Lucha Libre (CMLL). The show took place on October 28, 2016 in CMLL's main venue, Arena México, in Mexico City, Mexico and celebrated the Mexican Day of the Dead celebration. Many of the wrestlers working the show wore the traditional Día de Muertos face and body paint for the Día de Muerto event. From the fourth match on the losing wrestlers were dragged to El Inframundo ("The Underworld"), a side entrance in the arena, by a group of wrestlers dressed up as minions of the ruler of the underworld.

The main event was the finals of the 2016 Universal Championship tournament and saw Valiente defeat Volador Jr. to win the annual tournament. The show featured five additional matches.

== Production ==
=== Background ===
The October 31, 2014 Día de Muertos show was the first of Mexican professional wrestling promotion Consejo Mundial de Lucha Libre's Dia de los Muertos ("Day of the Dead") celebrations in 2014 and began a tradition of CMLL holding a major show to celebrate the Latin American holiday. As part of their Dia de los Muerte celebrations CMLL admitted all kids in costumes for free for the show. CMLL held a second Dia de los Muerte celebration on Sunday November 2 as well. Both shows included the Edcanes, CMLL's ring girls and various wrestlers dressed up in traditional Día de Muertos garb. In 2014, CMLL also turned the basement of Arena México into a haunted house attraction before each show. CMLL has held one or more shows to celebrate the holiday annually since 2014, with 2016 marking the third year in a row.

=== Storylines ===
The 2016 Dia de Muertos show featured six professional wrestling matches scripted by CMLL with some wrestlers involved in scripted feuds. Wrestlers portray either heels (referred to as rudos in Mexico, those that play the part of the "bad guys") or faces (técnicos in Mexico, the "good guy" characters) as they perform.

== Matches ==
No.	Results	Stipulations
1	Apocalipsis and Metálico defeated Bengala and Flyer	Best two-out-of-three falls tag team match
2	Disturbio, Okumura, and Virus defeated Oro Jr., Pegasso, and Soberano Jr.	Best two-out-of-three falls six-man tag team match
3	Estrellita, Marcela, and Sanely defeated La Amapola, Dalys la Caribeña, and La Metálica by disqualification	Best two-out-of-three falls six-man tag team match
4	Carístico, Dragon Lee, and Místico defeated Los Hijos del Infierno (Ephesto, Luciferno, and Mephisto)	Best two-out-of-three falls six-man tag team match
5	Los Ingobernables (La Máscara, Comandante Pierroth, and Rush) defeated Los Guerreros Laguneros (Euforia, Niebla Roja, and Último Guerrero)	Best two-out-of-three falls for the Rel del Inframundo championship
6	Valiente defeated Volador Jr.	Best two-out-of-three falls match, 2016 Universal Championship finals
