= AEW Road Rager =

All Elite Wrestling television special series

- AEW Road Rager logo
- Promotions: All Elite Wrestling
- First event: 2021
- Last event: 2022

AEW Road Rager was an annual professional wrestling television special produced by the American promotion All Elite Wrestling (AEW) in the summer. Established in 2021, the inaugural event aired as a special episode of the promotion's flagship weekly television program, Wednesday Night Dynamite. In 2022, it was expanded to a two-part event, with the second part airing as a special episode of Friday Night Rampage. The 2022 event would be the final Road Rager as the event was not held in 2023.

== History ==
Due to the COVID-19 pandemic that began effecting the industry in mid-March 2020, All Elite Wrestling (AEW) held the majority of their programs from Daily's Place in Jacksonville, Florida; these events were originally held without fans, but the company began running shows at 10–15% capacity in August, gradually increasing as time went on, before eventually running full capacity shows in May 2021. Also in May, AEW announced that they would be returning to live touring, beginning with a special episode of Dynamite titled Road Rager on July 7, in turn becoming the first major professional wrestling promotion to resume live touring during the pandemic. Road Rager was announced to be held in Miami, Florida at the James L. Knight Center and was the first of a four-week span of special Dynamite episodes as part of AEW's "Welcome Back" tour, which continued with the two-part Fyter Fest on July 14 and 21 and concluded with Fight for the Fallen on July 28.

== Events ==
#	Event	Date	City	Venue	Main event	Ref.
1	Road Rager (2021)	Dynamite; July 7, 2021	Miami, Florida	James L. Knight Center	The Young Bucks (Matt Jackson and Nick Jackson) (c) vs. Eddie Kingston and Penta El Zero Miedo in a Street Fight for the AEW World Tag Team Championship	
2	Road Rager (2022)	Night 1: Dynamite; June 15, 2022	St. Louis, Missouri	Chaifetz Arena	Jurassic Express (Jungle Boy and Luchasaurus) (c) vs. The Young Bucks (Matt Jackson and Nick Jackson) in a Tag team ladder match for the AEW World Tag Team Championship	
2	Road Rager (2022)	Night 2: Rampage; June 15, 2022 (aired June 17)	St. Louis, Missouri	Chaifetz Arena	Darby Allin vs. Bobby Fish	
(c) – refers to the champion(s) heading into the match

== See also ==
- List of All Elite Wrestling special events
- List of AEW Dynamite special episodes
- List of AEW Rampage special episodes
