= CMLL Día de Muertos (2018) =

Mexican professional wrestling show

- Official poster for the event
- Promotion: Consejo Mundial de Lucha Libre
- Date: November 2, 2018
- City: Mexico City, Mexico
- Venue: Arena México
- Tagline: Dioses en Guerra (Gods at War)

Event chronology
← Previous; Blue Panther 40th Anniversary Show	Next → Leyenda de Plata

Día de Muertos chronology
← Previous; 2017	Next → 2019

The CMLL Día de Muertos (2018) (Spanish for "Day of the Dead") is a professional wrestling pay-per-view event, scripted and produced by the Mexican Lucha Libre promotion Consejo Mundial de Lucha Libre (CMLL). The show took place on November 2, 2018, in CMLL's main venue, Arena México, in Mexico City, Mexico and celebrated the Mexican Day of the Dead celebration. Many of the wrestlers working the show wore the traditional Día de Muertos face and body paint for the Día de Muerto event. From the fourth match on the losing wrestlers were dragged to El Inframundo ("The Underworld"), a side entrance in the arena, by a group of wrestlers dressed up as minions of the ruler of the underworld.

As part of the show Sansón successfully defended the Rey del Inframundo ("King of the Underworld") championship that he won at the 2017 Día de Muertos show against challenger Templario. The main event was a Relevos increíbles (Miss-matched team match) where the technico (those that portray the "good guys") King Phoenix teamed with his brother Penta 0M and Último Guerrero, who are both rudos ("the bad guys"), losing to the team of Diamante Azul, L.A. Park, and Michael Elgin. The show featured four additional matches.

== Production ==
=== Background ===
The October 31, 2014 Día de Muertos show was the first of Mexican professional wrestling promotion Consejo Mundial de Lucha Libre's Dia de los Muertos ("Day of the Dead") celebrations in 2014 and began a tradition of CMLL holding a major show to celebrate the Latin American holiday. As part of their Dia de los Muerte celebrations CMLL admitted all kids in costumes for free for the show. CMLL held a second Dia de los Muerte celebration on Sunday November 2 as well. Both shows included the Edcanes, CMLL's ring girls and various wrestlers dressed up in traditional Día de Muertos garb. In 2014, CMLL also turned the basement of Arena México into a haunted house attraction before each show. CMLL has held one or more shows to celebrate the holiday annually since 2014, with 2018 marking the fifth year in a row.

=== Storylines ===
The 2018 Dia de Muertos show features six professional wrestling matches scripted by CMLL with some wrestlers involved in scripted feuds. Wrestlers portray either heels (referred to as rudos in Mexico, those that play the part of the "bad guys") or faces (técnicos in Mexico, the "good guy" characters) as they perform.

At the 2017 Día de Muertos show, Sansón outlasted El Cuatrero, Diamante Azul, Forastero, Hechicero, Mistico, Soberano Jr. and Valiente in a torneo cibernetico elimination match to become the first ever Rey del Inframundo ("King of the Underworld"). While Sansón was given a championship belt to symbolize his victory it is not a championship, but a tournament trophy that is not defended outside of the annual tournament in the vein of CMLL's Leyenda de Plata or Leyenda de Azul tournaments. On the October 26, 2018 CMLL Super Viernes show 12 wrestlers competed in the first round of the 2018 Rey del Inframundo tournament, with Templario winning the match over a field that included Audaz, Black Panther, El Cuatrero, Esfinge, Flyer, Forastero, Guerrero Maya Jr., Kawato San, Tiger, Tritón, and Virus, thus qualifying for the final match against Sansón on November 2.

== Matches ==
No.	Results	Stipulations
1	El Coyote and Grako defeated Oro Jr. and Súper Astro Jr.	Best two-out-of-three falls tag team match
2	Átomo, Gallito, and Microman defeated Chamuel, Mije, and Perico Zakarías	Best two-out-of-three falls six-man tag team match
3	Hechicero, Rey Bucanero, and El Terrible defeated Ángel de Oro, Audaz, and Stuka Jr.	Best two-out-of-three falls six-man tag team match
4	Atlantis, El Hijo de L.A. Park, and Místico defeated Bárbaro Cavernario and Los Hijos del Infierno (Ephesto and Mephisto)	Best two-out-of-three falls six-man tag team match
5	Sansón (c) defeated Templario	Best two-out-of-three falls for the Rey del Inframundo championship
6	Diamante Azul, L.A. Park, and Michael Elgin defeated King Phoenix, Penta 0M, and Último Guerrero	Six-man Relevos increíbles match
(c) / – the champion(s) heading into the match

== See also ==
- 2018 in professional wrestling
