= CMLL Universal Championship (2016) =

Mexican professional wrestling tournament

- Official poster for Block A, mistakenly listing Cavernario as a participant.
- Promotion: Consejo Mundial de Lucha Libre
- Date: October 14, 2016 to October 28, 2016
- City: Mexico City, Mexico
- Venue: Arena México

Event chronology
| ← Previous; Reyes del Aire | Next → Día de Muertos |

CMLL Universal Championship tournaments chronology
| ← Previous; 2015 | Next → 2017 |

The CMLL Universal Championship (2016) (Spanish: Campeonato Universal) was a professional wrestling tournament produced and scripted by Consejo Mundial de Lucha Libre (CMLL). The tournament took place from October 14, 2016 and ran for three Super Viernes shows with the finals on October 28, 2016. The CMLL Universal Championship is an annual tournament exclusively for wrestlers holding CMLL-recognized champions; first held in 2009, making the 2016 version the eight overall tournament. Being a professional wrestling tournament, it is not won legitimately; it is instead won via predetermined outcomes to the matches that is kept secret from the general public.

The 2016 tournament saw CMLL World Trios Champion Valiente defeat his regular Trios partner Volador Jr. in the finals of the tournament to win his first Universal Championship tournament.

== Background ==
The tournament featured 15 professional wrestling matches under single-elimination tournament rules, which means that wrestlers would be eliminated from the tournament when they lose a match. All male "non-regional" CMLL champions at the time of the tournament are eligible to participate in the tournament. The CMLL World Mini-Estrella Championship and Mexican National Lightweight Championship are both exclusively for CMLL's Mini-Estrella division and thus not eligible for the tournament. Regionally promoted championships such as the CMLL Arena Coliseo Tag Team Championship and the Occidente championships promoted in Guadalajara, Jalisco have not been included in the tournament in the past; only titles that have been defended in CMLL's main venue Arena Mexico are normally included, although exceptions have been made to allow New Japan Pro-Wrestling (NJPW) champions to compete if they were in Mexico at the time. For the 2016 version of the tournament only 15 out of the 16 participants had competed in at least one Universal Championship tournament before, only Rey Cometa (the Mexican National Welterweight Champion) was a first time competitor. Atlantis (Mexican National Light Heavyweight Champion) and Último Guerrero (NWA World Historic Middleweight Champion) were the only former tournament winners to participate in the 2016 tournament. Mephisto's (CMLL World Welterweight Champion and Mexican National Trios Champion) participation made him the only wrestler to participate in seven out of the eight Universal Championship tournaments up until that point. Negro Casas (CMLL World Tag Team Champion), La Máscara (CMLL World Light Heavyweight Champion), Último Guerrero and Volador Jr. (NWA World Historic Welterweight Champion and CMLL World Trios Champion) all marked their sixth Universal Championship tournament. CMLL originally announced that Cavernario would be part of the tournament, despite having lost the Mexican National Welterweight Championship to Rey Cometa on June 10, 2016. They later corrected the participant list, replacing Cavernario with Rey Cometa.

=== Eligible champions ===
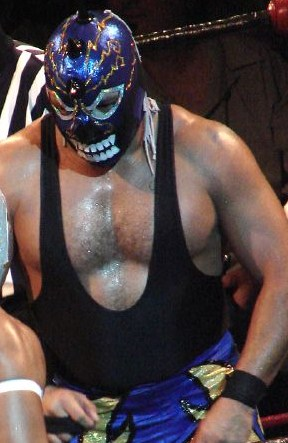
Mephisto, double champion and the only 7 time tournament participant

| Champion | Championship held | Block | Ref(s) |
|---|---|---|---|
| Atlantis | Mexican National Light Heavyweight Championship | Block B | |
| Negro Casas | CMLL World Tag Team Championship | Block A | |
| Dragon Lee | CMLL World Lightweight Championship | Block B | |
| Dragón Rojo, Jr. | CMLL World Middleweight Championship | Block B | |
| Ephesto | Mexican National Trios Championship | Block B | |
| Lucifierno | Mexican National Trios Championship | Block B | |
| La Máscara | CMLL World Light Heavyweight Championship | Block B | |
| Máximo Sexy | CMLL World Heavyweight Championship | Block A | |
| Mephisto | CMLL World Welterweight Championship; Mexican National Trios Championship | Block A | |
| Místico | CMLL World Trios Championship | Block A | |
| Rey Cometa | Mexican National Welterweight Championship | Block A | |
| Rey Bucanero | NWA World Historic Light Heavyweight Championship | Block B | |
| Shocker | CMLL World Tag Team Championship | Block A | |
| Último Guerrero | NWA World Historic Middleweight Championship | Block A | |
| Valiente | CMLL World Trios Championship | Block A | |
| Volador Jr. | CMLL World Trios Championship; NWA World Historic Welterweight Championship | Block B | |

== Tournament ==
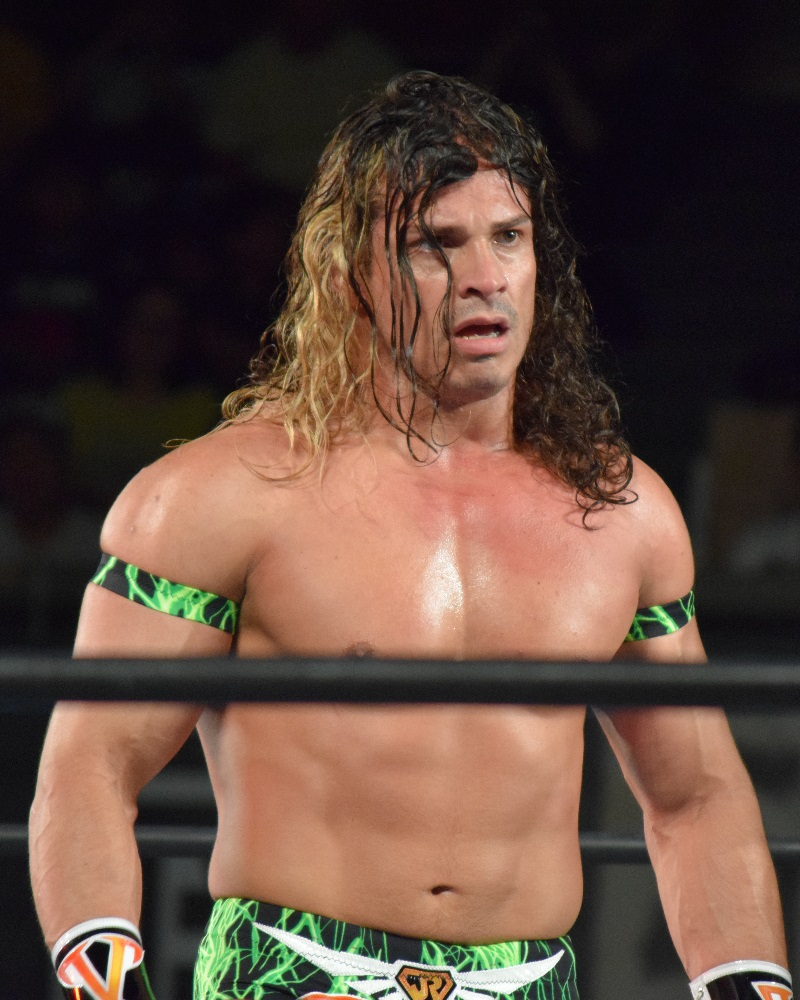
Volador Jr., double champion and tournament finalist

First round
Máximo Sexy | W
Rey Cometa
Negro Casas
Valiente | W
Último Guerrero | W
Místico
Shocker | W
Mephisto
Dragon Lee | W
Luciferno
Ephesto
La Máscara | W
Dragón Rojo Jr.
Volador Jr. | W
Rey Bucanero
Atlantis | W

Second round
Máximo Sexy
Valiente | W
Último Guerrero | W
Shocker
Dragon Lee
La Máscara | W
Volador Jr. | W
Atlantis

Semifinals
Valiente | W
Último Guerrero
La Máscara
Volador Jr. | W

Finals
Valiente | W
Volador Jr.
