= CMLL 82nd Anniversary Show =

Mexican professional wrestling supercard show

- Official poster for the show depicting the main event competitors Atlantis (left, white and blue mask) and La Sombra (right, black and red mask)
- Promotion: Consejo Mundial de Lucha Libre
- Date: September 18, 2015
- City: Mexico City, Mexico
- Venue: Arena México
- Attendance: 14,300

Event chronology
← Previous; Sin Salida	Next → Universal Championship

CMLL Anniversary Shows chronology
← Previous; CMLL 81st Anniversary Show	Next → CMLL 83rd Anniversary Show

The CMLL 82nd Anniversary Show (Spanish: 82. Aniversario de CMLL) was a major professional wrestling pay-per-view (PPV) event produced by the lucha libre wrestling company Consejo Mundial de Lucha Libre (CMLL; Spanish for "World Wrestling Council") that took place on September 18, 2015, in CMLL's home arena Arena México in Mexico City, Mexico. The event commemorated the 82nd anniversary of the creation of CMLL, which is the oldest still-active professional wrestling promotion in the world. CMLL's anniversary shows are their biggest, most important show of the year, comparable to the Super Bowl for the National Football League or WrestleMania for WWE. The CMLL Anniversary Show series is the longest-running annual professional wrestling show, starting in 1934.

In May 2015 CMLL announced that they were holding a contest for kids to write a story that included CMLL and its wrestlers in some way. As part of the announcement, they also revealed that the 2015 Anniversary show would be held on September 18, but was later changed to September 4, before going back to 18. The main event of the show saw Atlantis and La Sombra facing off in a Lucha de Apuestas, or "Bet match", with both men risking their wrestling mask on the outcome of the match.

== Production ==
=== Background ===
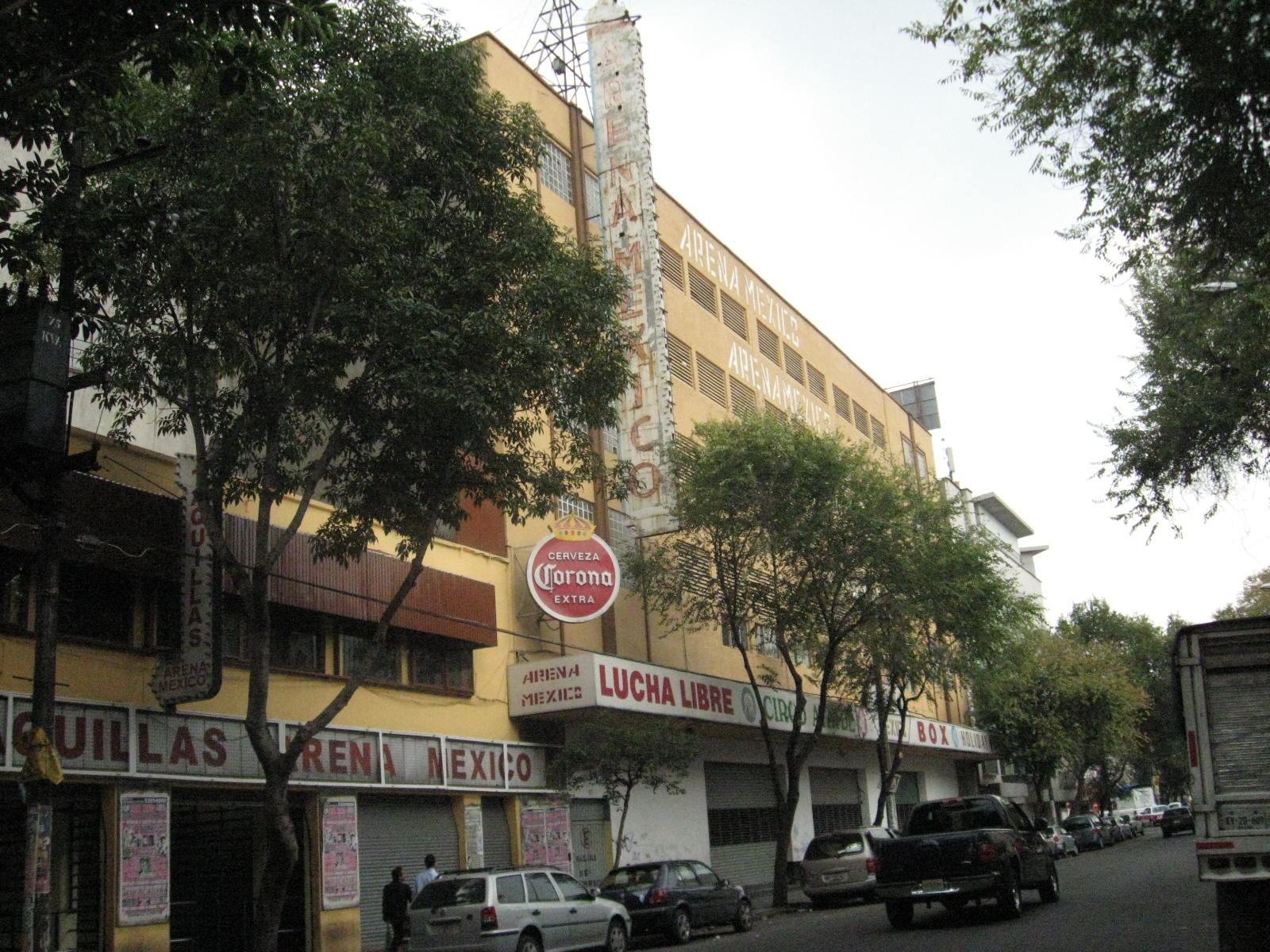
Arena México, CMLL's main venue and location of the 82nd Anniversary Show

The Mexican Lucha libre (professional wrestling) company Consejo Mundial de Lucha Libre (CMLL) started out under the name Empresa Mexicana de Lucha Libre ("Mexican Wrestling Company"; EMLL), founded by Salvador Lutteroth in 1933. Lutteroth, inspired by professional wrestling shows he had attended in Texas, decided to become a wrestling promoter and held his first show on September 21, 1933, marking what would be the beginning of organized professional wrestling in Mexico. Lutteroth would later become known as "the father of Lucha Libre" . A year later EMLL held the EMLL 1st Anniversary Show, starting the annual tradition of the Consejo Mundial de Lucha Libre Anniversary Shows that have been held each year ever since, most commonly in September.

Over the years the anniversary show would become the biggest show of the year for CMLL, akin to the Super Bowl for the National Football League (NFL) or WWE's WrestleMania event. The first anniversary show was held in Arena Modelo, which Lutteroth had bought after starting EMLL. In 1942–43 Lutteroth financed the construction of Arena Coliseo, which opened in April 1943. The EMLL 10th Anniversary Show was the first of the anniversary shows to be held in Arena Coliseo. In 1956 Lutteroth had Arena México built in the location of the original Arena Modelo, making Arena México the main venue of EMLL from that point on. Starting with the EMLL 23rd Anniversary Show, all anniversary shows except for the EMLL 46th Anniversary Show have been held in the arena that would become known as "The Cathedral of Lucha Libre". On occasion EMLL held more than one show labelled as their "Anniversary" show, such as two 33rd Anniversary Shows in 1966. Over time the anniversary show series became the oldest, longest-running annual professional wrestling show. In comparison, WWE's WrestleMania is only the fourth oldest still promoted show (CMLL's Arena Coliseo Anniversary Show and Arena México anniversary shows being second and third). EMLL was supposed to hold the EMLL 52nd Anniversary Show on September 20, 1985 but Mexico City was hit by a magnitude 8.0 earthquake. EMLL canceled the event both because of the general devastation but also over fears that Arena México might not be structurally sound after the earthquake.

When Jim Crockett Promotions was bought by Ted Turner in 1988 EMLL became the oldest still active promotion in the world. In 1991 EMLL was rebranded as "Consejo Mundial de Lucha Libre" and thus held the CMLL 59th Anniversary Show, the first under the new name, on September 18, 1992. Traditionally CMLL holds their major events on Friday Nights, replacing their regularly scheduled Super Viernes show. For the show CMLL, together with Telcel announced a free ticket drawing contest starting in July. On August 3, 2015, during a live CMLL broadcast the announcers stated that the 82nd Anniversary Show would take place on September 4, 2015, moving it forward two weeks in time compared to the date mentioned in the contest announcements. However, following negative feedback from fans, the show was moved back to September 18 just three days later.

=== Storylines ===
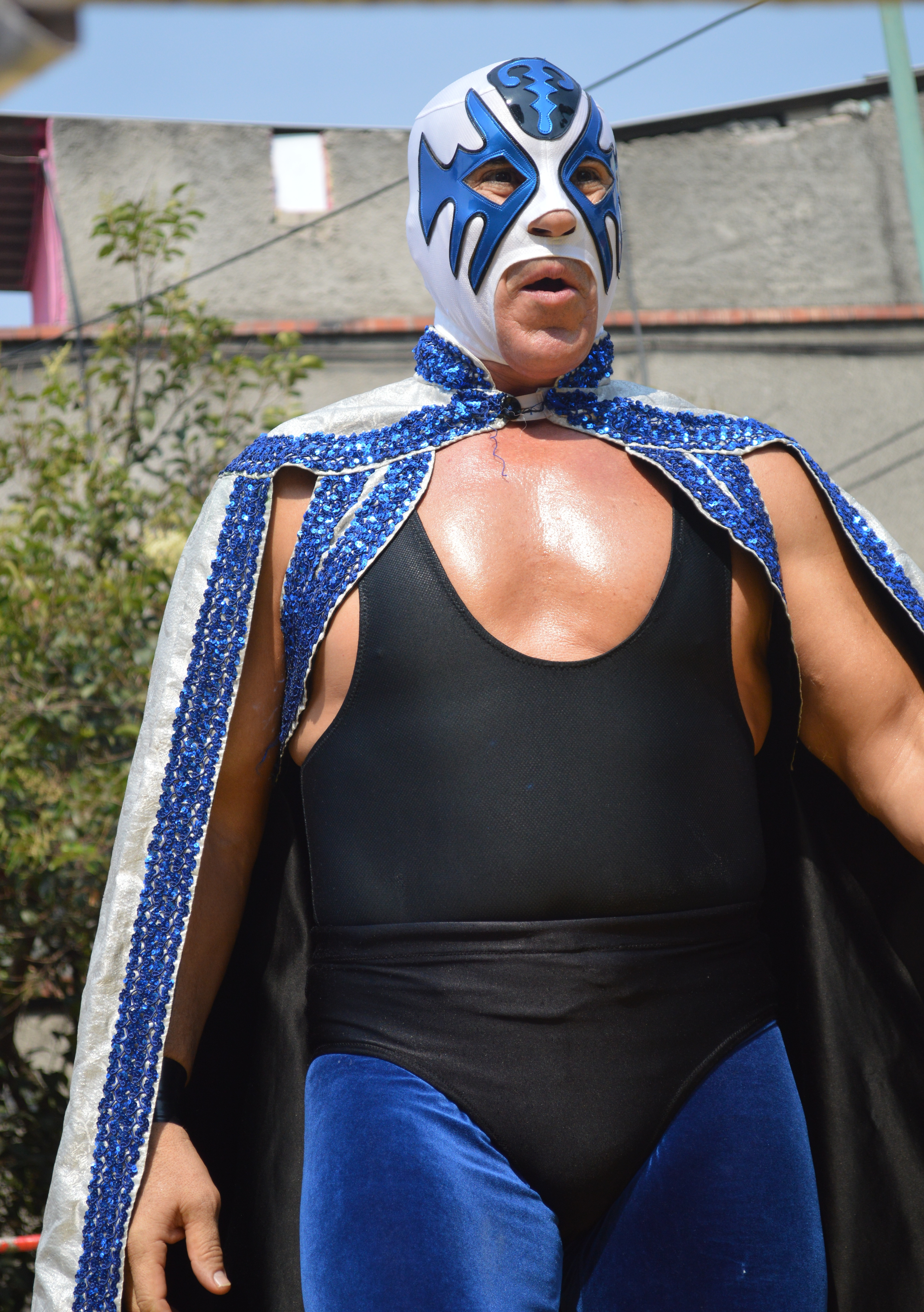
Atlantis, kept his mask in the main event of the CMLL 81st Anniversary Show, risking it again one year later.

The 82nd Anniversary show featured six professional wrestling matches with different wrestlers involved in pre-existing, scripted feuds, and storylines. Wrestlers were portrayed as either heels (referred to as rudos in Mexico, those that portray the "bad guys") or faces (técnicos in Mexico, the "good guy" characters) as they followed a series of tension-building events, which culminated in a wrestling match or series of matches.

At the CMLL 80th Anniversary Show in 2013 the team of La Sombra and Volador Jr. faced off against Atlantis and Último Guerrero, in a Relevos Suicidas ("Suicide Relay") match where the winning team would face off against each other in a Lucha de Apuestas, or "bet match", in the main event of the show. The match paired long time rivals Sombra and Volador against another pair of rivals in Atlantis and Guerrero with both rivalries stretching back several years at that point. In the end La Sombra and Volador Jr. won the match and the right to wrestle for their masks later on in the show. In the end La Sombra defeated Volador Jr., forcing him to unmask and reveal his real name per lucha libre traditions. During the show the fans voiced their displeasure of being denied the Atlantis/Último Guerrero match, the biggest storyline of that year and booed the técnico La Sombra as a way to show their displeasure of the "bait and switch" tactics. After the 80th Anniversary the fan support led to Volador Jr. becoming a técnico and La Sombra stated to work a more aggressive, rudo-style of wrestling. In 2014 he joined together with Rush and La Máscara to form Los Ingobernables ("The Unruly"), a trio that straddled the definition of rudo and tecnico, only getting along with members of Los Ingobernables even if paired up with tecnico wrestlers, while generally working against rudo wrestlers. CMLL did finally deliver the Atlantis vs. Último Guerrero Lucha de Apuestas a year later at the CMLL 81st Anniversary Show where Atlantis defeated and unmasked Último Guerrero in the main event. Over the summer of 2015 Los Ingobernables started to wrestle against tecnico teams instead of generally facing rudo teams as they had been up to that point. In August, 2015 Los Ingobernables found themselves facing off against Atlantis on multiple occasions, often with La Sombra going out of his way to attack Atlantis, tearing Atlantis' mask apart during matches to show his disdain for the veteran tecnico. On August 19, 2015 CMLL held a press conference where they announced that the winner of the main event of the 80th Anniversary, La Sombra, would put his mask on the line against the winner of the main event of the 81st Anniversary Show, Atlantis, in the main event of CMLL's 82nd Anniversary Show on September 18, 2015. After the press conference both wrestlers stressed the fact that they were looking forward to a singles match between the two and hoping that no one would be added to the match in the way CMLL handled the 80th Anniversary Show.

On August 26, Dark Angel revealed that would wrestle in her last CMLL match at the 82nd Anniversary, leaving the promotion after working for them for over 10 years. Dark Angel, real name Sarah Stock, began working in Mexico in the early 2000s as the enmascarada character Dark Angel. Initially she worked on the independent circuit, especially for the all women's wrestling promotion Lucha Libre Feminil out of Monterrey, Nuevo León. In Nueva Leon she developed a long running storyline rivalry with Princesa Sugehit, a rivalry that later led to a Lucha de Apuestas match between the two, with Princesa Sugehit unmasking the Canadian Dark Angel. In 2005 CMLL relaunched their women's division and brought in a number of female wrestlers, including Dark Angel. On September 16, 2005 Dark Angel lost to Marcela on the CMLL 72nd Anniversary Show in the finals of a tournament for the vacant CMLL World Women's Championship. In 2006 she defeated La Amapola, one of her biggest CMLL rivals in a Lucha de Apuestas match to unmask La Amapola. Over the years she faced or teamed with almost every single female competitor to work for CMLL and won female division of the annual CMLL body building contest for eight of the nine years she entered it. In 2015 Stock was invited to be a guest trainer at the WWE Performance Center training facilities in Florida, which later led to her signing a contract to work for them full-time. It was announced that her last match in CMLL would be against the woman who took her mask 11 years earlier, Princesa Sugehit.

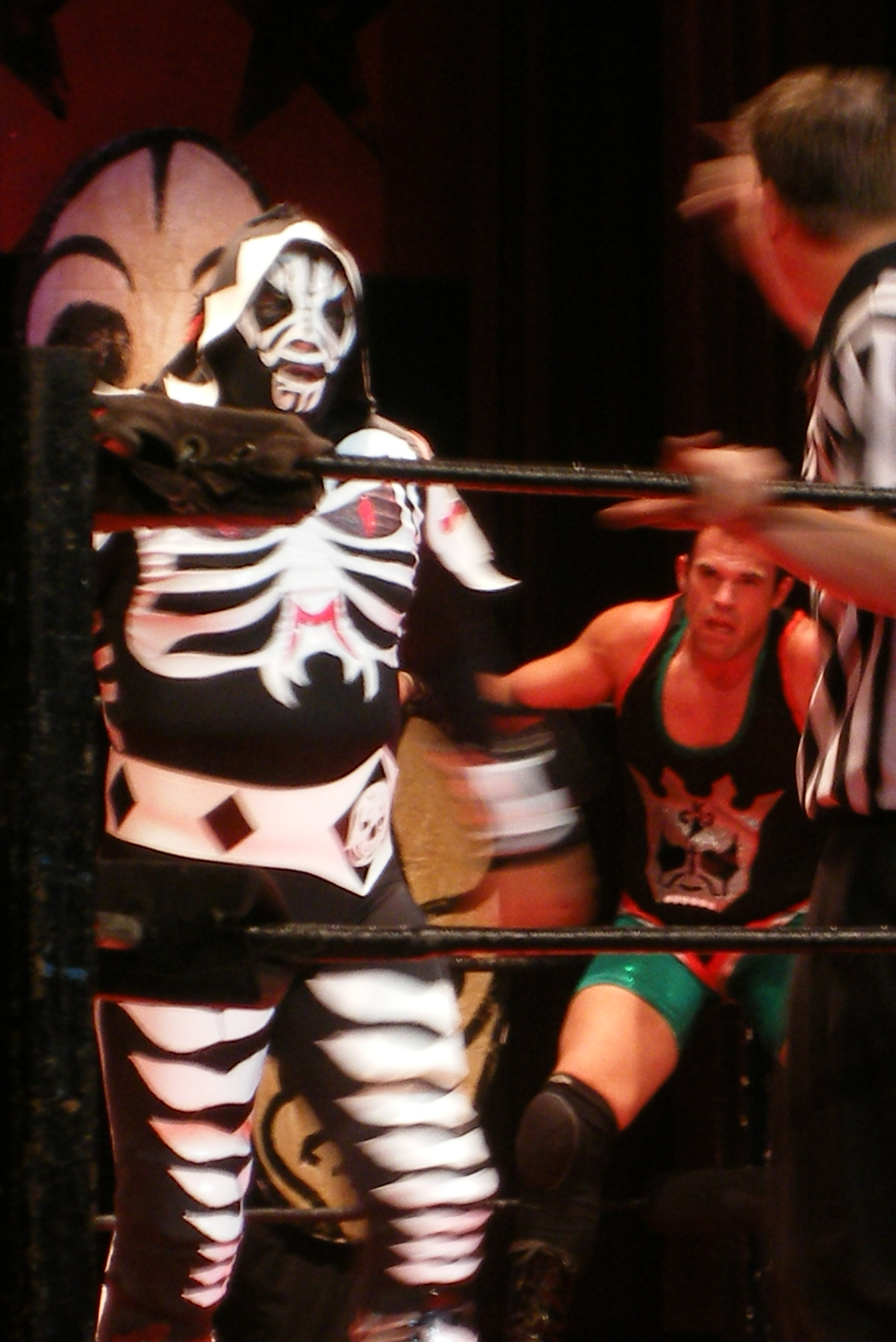
L.A. Park, worked for CMLL a few weeks before being fired.

During the August 19 CMLL Press conference it was revealed that former CMLL wrestlers Dr. Wagner Jr. and L.A. Park would both return to the company almost exactly seven years after they were both fired for breaking CMLL's rules during a match on the CMLL 75th Anniversary Show. In the weeks leading up to the announcement L.A. Park had wrestled against CMLL mainstay Rush on several occasions, normally ending in an inconclusive manner via disqualifications etc. L.A. Park had also been antagonistic of La Sombra, especially after La Sombra unmasked Park's nephew Volador Jr., leading to a family feud of sorts between the two. Both Park and Dr. Wagner Jr. made their in-ring return to CMLL on the August 28 Super Viernes show on opposite sides of the main event. Dr Wagner Jr. teamed with Los Ingobernables members Rush and La Sombra to face off against Atlantis, L.A. Park and Volador Jr. during the match Park and Rush primarily fought each other, La Sombra and Altlantis fought both inside and outside the ring and Dr. Wagner Jr. focused primarily on Volador Jr. Initially Los Ingobernales were a bit weary of Dr. Wagner Jr. but later started to work more with him. When the 82nd Anniversary Show matches were announced the following week CMLL booked a Relevos Increibles match, or "Incredible relays" match with Park teaming up with Último Guerrero and Volador Jr. to take on Dr. Wagner Jr., Rush and Thunder, in a match where the teams are mixed along the tecnico/rudo lines. In the main event of that Friday's Super Viernes, La Sombra and Dr. Wagner Jr. teamed up once more, taking on Atlantis and L.A. Park, in a match that once again turned into an out-of-control fight between the two sides. In the end Atlantis and L.A. Park won the match, but were both unmasked afterwards in a small measure of revenge by La Sombra and Dr. Wagner Jr. Following the match L.A. Park took the microphone and insulted the fans in the arena. Originally CMLL announced that L.A. Park and Volador Jr would team up with Super Parka, Volador Jr.'s father and L.A. Park's brother the following week, but by Monday CMLL removed L.A. Park from that match as well as removing him from the 82nd Anniversary Show, replacing him with Shocker instead. No official explanation was given for why CMLL severed their working relationship with L.A. Park at that time, but was later explained that his expletive laden speech was what caused CMLL to fire him. On September 11 CMLL announced that Dr. Wagner Jr. was off the. anniversary show, replacing him in the match with Marco Corleone. Revealing that Dr. Wagner Jr. made the choice to leave CMLL, calling the company to tell them he was no longer interested in working for CMLL.

== Reception ==
Wrestling Observer Figure Four online website stated that the main event "was great due to Sombra but Atlantis did a great job considering his age with multiple dives". But did also state that this was a "one match show". The also stated that the Dark Angel vs. Princesa Sujei match had "some good wrestling but it went too long and they went past their peak". ESTO, a Mexican sports magazine, wrote in an editorial that Atlantis "made his legendary status clear" with the victory and that both wrestlers worked a "spectacular" match.

== Results ==
No.	Results	Stipulations	Times
1	Disturbio, Puma and Virus defeated Esfinge, Fuego and The Panther – two falls to one	Best two-out-of-three falls six-man "Lucha Libre rules" tag team match	20:00
2	Los Revolucionarios del Terror (Rey Escorpión, Dragón Rojo Jr. and Pólvora) defeated Máximo, Guerrero Maya Jr. and Stuka Jr. – two falls to one	Best two-out-of-three falls six-man "Lucha Libre rules" tag team match	20:20
3	Dark Angel defeated Princesa Sugehit	Singles match	16:46
4	Dragon Lee and Sky Team (Místico and Valiente) defeated La Peste Negra (Negro Casas, El Felino and Mr. Niebla) – two falls to one	Best two-out-of-three falls six-man "Lucha Libre rules" tag team match	14:32
5	Shocker, Último Guerrero, Volador Jr. defeated Los Ingobernables (Marco Corleone and Rush) and Thunder by disqualification – two falls to one	Best two-out-of-three falls six-man Relevos Increibles match	15:38
6	Atlantis defeated La Sombra – two falls to one	Best two-out-of-three falls Lucha de Apuestas, mask vs. mask match	28:30
