= CMLL Día de Muertos (2017) =

Mexican professional wrestling event

- Official poster for the event
- Promotion: Consejo Mundial de Lucha Libre
- Date: November 3, 2017
- City: Mexico City, Mexico
- Venue: Arena México

Event chronology
← Previous; Leyenda de Plata	Next → Leyendas Mexicanas

Día de Muertos chronology
← Previous; 2016	Next → 2018

The CMLL Día de Muertos(2017) (Spanish for "Day of the Dead") is professional wrestling supercard event scripted and produced by the Mexican Lucha Libre promotion Consejo Mundial de Lucha Libre (CMLL). The show took place on November 3, 2017 at CMLL's main venue, Arena México, in Mexico City, Mexico and celebrated the Mexican Day of the Dead holiday that ends on November 2 each year. For the event several wrestlers wore traditional Día de Muertos face and body paint. From the fourth match on the losing wrestlers would be dragged to El Inframundo ("The Underworld"), a side entrance in the arena. by a group of wrestlers dressed up as minions of the ruler of the underworld.

The main event was a Six-man "Lucha Libre rules" tag team match where Los Guerreros Laguneros (Euforia, Gran Guerrero and Último Guerrero) defeated Carístico, Rush and Volador Jr. by disqualification. The semi-main event was an eight-man elimination match for the Rey del Inframundo ("King of the Underworld") Championship, a championship created specifically for the show. The match was won by Sansón, lastly eliminating his long-time rival Soberano Jr. Also on the show, reigning CMLL World Women's Champion Dalys la Caribeña successfully defended her championship against four-time champion Marcela. The show included three additional matches.

== Production ==
=== Background ===
The October 31, 2014 Día de Muertos show was the first of Mexican professional wrestling promotion Consejo Mundial de Lucha Libre's Dia de los Muertos ("Day of the Dead") celebrations in 2014 and began a tradition of CMLL holding a major show to celebrate the Latin American holiday. As part of their Dia de los Muerte celebrations CMLL admitted all kids in costumes for free for the show. CMLL held a second Dia de los Muerte celebration on Sunday November 2 as well. Both shows included the Edcanes, CMLL's ring girls and various wrestlers dressed up in traditional Día de Muertos garb. In 2014, CMLL also turned the basement of Arena México into a haunted house attraction before each show. CMLL has held one or more shows to celebrate the holiday annually since 2014, with 2018 marking the fourth year in a row.

=== Storylines ===
The Dia de Muertos show featured six professional wrestling matches scripted by CMLL with some wrestlers involved in scripted feuds. The wrestlers portray either heels (referred to as rudos in Mexico, those that play the part of the "bad guys") or faces (técnicos in Mexico, the "good guy" characters) as they perform.

== Results ==
No.	Results	Stipulations
1	Astral and Robin defeated Artillero and Espanto Jr.	Best two-out-of-three falls tag team match
2	Drone, Esfinge and Rey Cometa defeated La Dinastia Casas (Puma and Tiger) and Virus	Six-man "Lucha Libre rules" tag team match
3	La Peste Negra (Bárbaro Cavernario and Negro Casas) and Shocker defeated Ángel de Oro, Niebla Roja and Stuka Jr.	Six-man "Lucha Libre rules" tag team match
4	Dalys la Caribeña (c) defeated Marcela	Best two-out-of-three falls match for the CMLL World Women's Championship
5	Sansón defeated El Cuatrero, Diamante Azul, Forastero, Hechicero, Místico, Soberano Jr. and Valiente	Eight-man torneo cibernetico elimination match for the Rey del Inframundo Championship
6	Los Guerreros Laguneros (Euforia, Gran Guerrero and Último Guerrero) defeated Carístico, Rush and Volador Jr. by disqualification	Six-man "Lucha Libre rules" tag team match
(c) / – the champion(s) heading into the match

=== Rey del Inframundo order of elimination ===
Order	Wrestler	Eliminated by
1	Forastero	Valiente
2	Valiente	Hechicero
3	Hechicero	Diamante Azul
4	Diamante Azul	El Cuatrero and Sansón
5	Mistico	Sansón
6	El Cuatrero	El Soberano Jr.
7	El Soberano Jr.	Sansón
1	Winner	Sansón

== See also ==
- 2017 in professional wrestling
