= Andrade El Idolo =

Mexican professional wrestler (born 1989)

Andrade El Ídolo
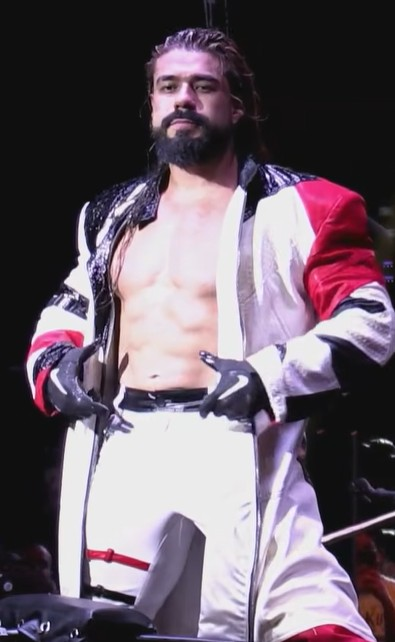
- Andrade in February 2026

Personal information
- Born: Manuel Alfonso Andrade Oropeza; November 3, 1989 (age 37) Gómez Palacio, Durango, Mexico
- Spouse: Ashley Fliehr (m. 2022; div. 2024)
- Children: 1
- Relatives: Espanto Jr. (uncle); Espanto Jr. (II) (cousin); Brillante Jr. (II) (cousin)

Professional wrestling career
- Ring name(s): Andrade; Andrade "Cien" Almas; Andrade El Ídolo; Brillante; Brillante Jr. Guerrero Azteca; La Sombra; Manny Andrade; Rey Azteca
- Billed height: 5 ft 9 in (175 cm)
- Billed weight: 230 lb (104 kg)
- Billed from: Gómez Palacio, Durango, Mexico
- Trained by: Brillante Sr. El Satánico; Franco Columbo; Moro III; Stuka
- Debut: October 3, 2003

Manuel Alfonso Andrade Oropeza (born November 3, 1989) is a Mexican professional wrestler. As of January 2026, he is signed to All Elite Wrestling (AEW), where he performs under the ring name Andrade El Ídolo and is a member of the United Empire. He also makes appearances on the independent circuit and for partner promotion New Japan Pro-Wrestling (NJPW).

A third-generation professional wrestler, Andrade made his debut a month before his 14th birthday and worked under the name Brillante Jr. in reference to his father, who wrestled as Brillante. He spent eight years wrestling for Consejo Mundial de Lucha Libre (CMLL) under the name La Sombra (Spanish for "The Shadow"), where he won the 2007 Torneo Gran Alternativa tournament and the 2011 Universal Championship, as well as simultaneously holding the CMLL World Tag Team Championship, Mexican National Trios Championship, and NWA World Historic Welterweight Championship. He was one of the founding members of the Los Ingobernables ("the Ungovernables") stable, and won the masks of El Felino, Olímpico, and Volador Jr. by defeating them in Lucha de Apuestas matches before losing his own mask to Atlantis. While working for CMLL, Andrade also made appearances for New Japan Pro-Wrestling (NJPW) as part of a working agreement between CMLL and NJPW, winning the IWGP Intercontinental Championship.

After close to a decade with CMLL, Andrade joined WWE in 2015. He initially wrestled for its NXT brand under the ring name Andrade "Cien" Almas, winning the NXT Championship. In April 2018, he joined WWE's main roster where his ring name was shorted to simply Andrade. Andrade held the WWE United States Championship for several months in 2019–2020. He departed WWE in March 2021, debuting in AEW that July as Andrade El Ídolo. Andrade departed AEW in December 2023 and returned to WWE the following month at the Royal Rumble, winning the WWE Speed Championship in June 2024. He departed WWE for a second time in September 2025, making his return to AEW that October but was removed from television due to violating a non-compete clause set by WWE after his departure that expired in December. In the same month, he announced his return to NJPW as a member of the United Empire and would win the IWGP Global Heavyweight Championship. He officially returned to AEW in January 2026 and would go on to win the AEW National Championship.

== Early life ==
Manuel Alfonso Andrade Oropeza was born in Gómez Palacio, Durango, on November 3, 1989. He is the son of Jose Andrade Salas, who wrestles as Brillante. He became part of the third generation of the Andrade family to compete in lucha libre. His grandfather, José Andrade, wrestled under the name "El Moro", while his uncles wrestle or wrestled under the names Diamante/Moro III (Sergio Andrade), Zafiro/Pentagoncito (real name unrevealed), Kevin (Juan Andrade), Espanto Jr./Pentagón (Jesús Andrade), and Espiritu Magico (Juan Andrade), and his younger cousins work in CMLL as the current Espanto Jr., Brillante Jr. and Lady Shadow as of 2023. (Note: In Lucha Libre it is a tradition to not reveal the birth name of masked wrestlers who have never been unmasked, newspapers do not report on or speculate about the name of a masked wrestler. The tradition is not upheld outside of Mexico so if masked wrestlers were to sign a contract with a non-Mexican company they will on occasion reveal the real name of a masked wrestler.)

== Professional wrestling career ==
=== Early career (2003–2007) ===
With his father, uncles and grandfather being involved in running a local lucha libre promotion and school in Durango, Andrade began training for a professional career from an early age, initially by playing around with his father and uncles before training seriously. He made his professional wrestling debut on October 3, 2003, a month before his 14th birthday, after his father signed a waiver for the local boxing and wrestling commission to issue him a license. He began working for his family's wrestling promotion under the ring name Brillante Jr., in honor of his father, from 2003 through early 2007. During this time period, he got involved in a storyline rivalry with his uncle, who wrestled as "Zafiro", defeating him in his first ever headline match, a Lucha de Apuestas ("bet match"), forcing Zafiro to have all his hair shaved off after the match. He later won another Lucha de Apuestas, forcing the masked wrestler Camorra to unmask in the middle of the ring and reveal his real name. (Note: Not the same Camorra that has worked for CMLL for years.) On occasion, Andrade also competed as the enmascarado (masked) characters "Guerrero Azteca" ("Aztec Warrior") and "Rey Azteca" ("Aztec King").

=== Consejo Mundial de Lucha Libre (2007–2015) ===
==== Championship success (2007–2010) ====
Andrade signed with Consejo Mundial de Lucha Libre (CMLL) in 2007 and, after training under head trainer El Satánico, made his CMLL in-ring debut on February 27 under his father's name "Brillante". In June, he was rechristened as "La Sombra" ("The Shadow"); CMLL had other wrestlers work under the name in the 1980s and 1990s, but the latest La Sombra was not promoted as having any relation to the previous incarnations, although the relationship was later subtly acknowledged when he began wrestling in a black and silver version of his father's mask. La Sombra quickly received a push as he and main técnico ("good guy") Místico defeated Euforia and Último Guerrero to win that month's Torneo Gran Alternativa ("Great Alternative Tournament"), where a rookie teams with a veteran. On August 13, he, El Sagrado and Volador Jr. defeated Los Perros del Mal (Damián 666, Halloween and Mr. Águila) for the Mexican National Trios Championship. At the CMLL 74th Anniversary Show on September 28, he, Alex Koslov and El Sagrado defeated Ephesto, Sangre Azteca and Toscano.

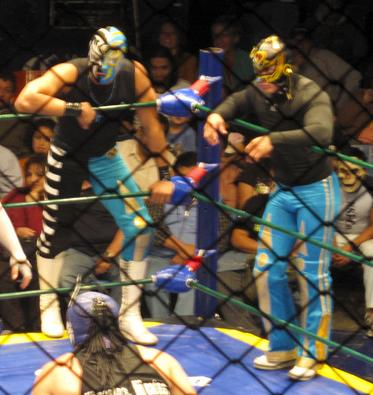
La Sombra (left) and Volador Jr. (right) in November 2009

At the age of 18, La Sombra defeated Hajime Ohara on November 27 to become the youngest NWA World Welterweight Champion, which he defended throughout 2008 against the likes of Mephisto and Ephesto. He, Koslov and Máximo lost to Los Perros del Mal at the CMLL 75th Anniversary Show on September 19. La Sombra became a triple champion on January 16, 2009, as he and Volador Jr., dubbed "Super Sky Team", defeated Averno and Mephisto for the CMLL World Tag Team Championship. This lasted until his team lost the Mexican National Trios Championship to Poder Mexica (Azteca, Black Warrior and Dragón Rojo Jr.) on February 3. On May 27, La Sombra lost the NWA World Welterweight Championship to Mephisto. For being a champion, he participated in the Universal Championship tournament on June 5, defeating Azteca in the first round and Averno in the quarter-finals, but lost to Texano Jr. in the semi-finals. At Sin Salida ("No Escape") on December 4, Super Sky Team successfully defended the title against Ephesto and Mephisto. On January 22, 2010, La Sombra and Dragón Rojo Jr. participated in the Torneo Nacional de Parejas Increibles ("National Incredible Pairs Tournament"), where a técnico is paired with a rúdo ("bad guy"), but lost to Atlantis and Máscara Dorada in the first round.

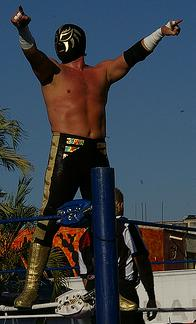
La Sombra posing at an outdoor event in May 2010

During the third fall of a singles match against El Felino on February 2, El Felino's son Puma King appeared in an El Felino outfit and mask, distracting both the referee and La Sombra long enough for El Felino to hit a low blow on and pin La Sombra. On February 19, he defeated El Felino in a lightning match (a one fall, 10 minute time limit match) by disqualification after Puma King interfered. In the main event of Homenaje a Dos Leyendas ("Homage to Two Legends") on March 19, he, El Felino, Místico and Volador Jr. fought in a four-way Lucha de Apuestas. La Sombra and El Felino were the first two men pinned, respectively, forcing the two to compete with their masks on the line; La Sombra pinned El Felino, forcing him to unmask. After winning a non-title match, La Sombra, Dorada and La Máscara defeated La Ola Amarilla (Hiroshi Tanahashi, Okumura and Taichi) for the CMLL World Trios Championship on May 21. On July 12, at the Promociones Gutiérrez 1st Anniversary Show, La Sombra and Histeria were one of five pareja increibles teams who put their mask on the line, with the losing team being forced to wrestle each other for their masks, facing Atlantis and Olímpico, Místico and El Oriental, El Alebrije and Volador Jr. and Averno and Guerrero. They retained their masks as the first team to escape the match.

==== Feud with Volador Jr. (2010–2014) ====
La Sombra and Volador Jr. lost the CMLL World Tag Team Championship to Los Invasores (Mr. Águila and Héctor Garza) four days later. He defeated Mephisto, Texano Jr. and Guerrero en route to the finals of the Universal Championship tournament on August 14, but lost to Jushin Thunder Liger after interference from Okumura. Five days prior, Volador Jr. turned rúdo by attacking La Sombra and tore his mask off, provoking a feud between the two. On August 30, he unsuccessfully challenged Volador Jr. for the Mexican National Light Heavyweight Championship. At the CMLL 77th Anniversary Show on September 13, La Sombra was one of fourteen men putting their mask on the line in a steel cage Lucha de Apuestas. In the end, La Sombra pinned Olímpico and forced him to unmask. On September 27, he failed to win Liger's CMLL World Middleweight Championship. La Sombra participated in the La Copa Junior ("The Junior Cup") tournament on December 10, respectively defeating Mephisto and Olímpico before losing to Dragón Rojo Jr. in the semi-finals.

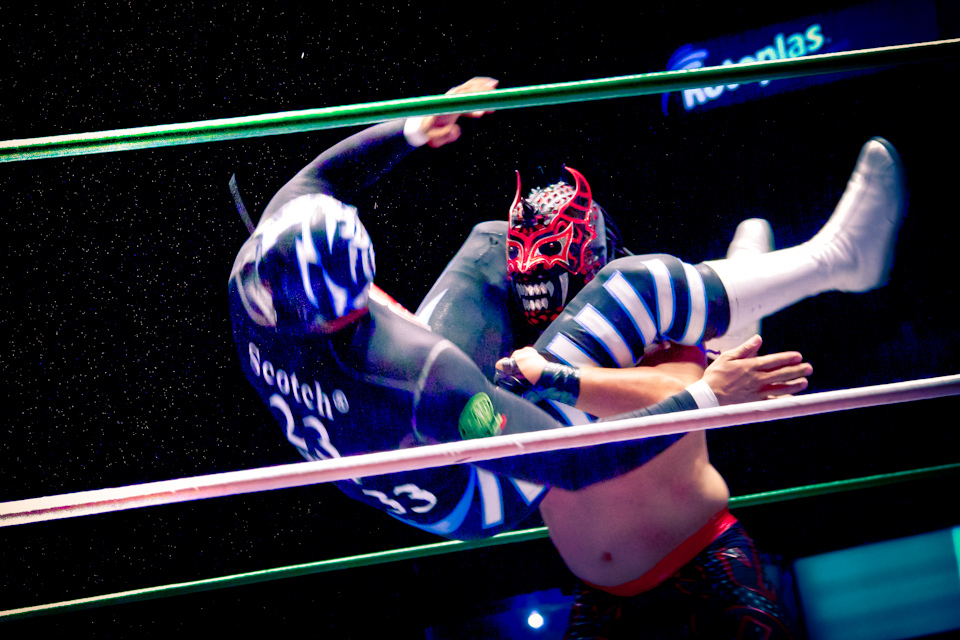
La Sombra wrestling Mephisto in December 2011

On March 13, 2011, La Sombra defeated Mephisto to win the NWA World Historic Welterweight Championship, making his first successful defense against Psicosis on April 10. On July 15, La Generación Dorada lost their championship to Los Hijos del Averno (Averno, Ephesto and Mephisto). Two months later, he won that year's Universal Championship tournament, defeating Ángel de Oro, Diamante, Rey Bucanero and lastly Averno on September 16. On February 13, 2012, he lost his championship after 337 days to Negro Casas. Four days later, he and Mr. Águila participated in the Torneo Nacional de Parejas Increíbles, defeating Máximo and Mephisto in the first round and Dorada and Volador Jr. in the quarter-finals, before losing to Atlantis and Mr. Niebla in the semi-finals. La Sombra failed to win Dragón Rojo Jr.'s CMLL World Middleweight Championship on April 30 and May 20. At the CMLL 79th Anniversary Show on September 14, he, Ángel de Oro and Titán defeated Namajague, Okumura and Taichi. On December 2, he unsuccessfully challenged for El Terrible's CMLL World Heavyweight Championship. He defeated Tama Tonga to win the La Copa Junior at Sin Piedad ("No Mercy") on December 14.

On February 15, 2013, La Sombra defeated Volador Jr. to win the Reyes del Aire ("Kings of the Air") tournament. They briefly put their issues aside for the Torneo Nacional de Parejas Increibles, defeating Casas and Guerrero Maya Jr., Averno and La Máscara and Shocker and Mr. Niebla to qualify for the finals on March 15 at Homenaje a Dos Leyendas, which they won by defeating Atlantis and Último Guerrero. La Sombra made it to the semi-finals of the Universal Championship tournament against Hiroshi Tanahashi on August 30, but lost after Volador Jr. interfered. On September 13, at the CMLL 80th Anniversary Show, La Sombra and Volador Jr. defeated Atlantis and Guerrero in a Relevos Suicidas match to advance to a mask vs. mask Lucha de Apuestas against each other in the main event, where La Sombra was victorious, forcing Volador Jr. to unmask. The main event was negatively received by the fans, who anticipated a match between Atlantis and Guerrero, resulting in loud "fraud" chants. After the match, the fans rallied behind Volador Jr., while booing and heckling La Sombra, the supposed técnico.

==== Los Ingobernables (2014–2015) ====
La Sombra formed a partnership with Rush and began working as a rúdo; the two refused to acknowledge themselves as such, referring to themselves as técnicos diferentes ("a different kind of good guy"). On June 6, 2014, with help from Rush and La Máscara, La Sombra, defending his NWA World Historic Middleweight Championship, defeated Volador Jr. to win the NWA World Historic Welterweight Championship. The trio was eventually named Los Ingobernables ("The Ungovernables"). He lost the title in a rematch on August 1 at Juicio Final ("Final Judgment"). After losing to Guerrero in the finals of the Universal Championship tournament on August 29, he failed to regain the title on October 6. After co-winning a torneo cibernetico with Bucanero on March 1, 2015, they fought for the vacant NWA World Light Heavyweight Championship the following week, which Bucanero won. On May 1, La Sombra won the Reyes del Aire.

On July 21, La Sombra and Rush were involved in an incident in Guadalajara, where the two attacked fans who were throwing beers at them during a match. The next day, Jalisco's Boxing and Wrestling Commission suspended them from wrestling in the state for three months, followed by CMLL pulling them from Super Viernes three days later without an official explanation. By August, Los Ingobernables faced off against Atlantis on multiple occasions, with La Sombra targeting Atlantis and tearing his mask apart. On August 31, he lost the NWA World Historic Middleweight Championship after two-and-a-half years to Guerrero. In the main event of the CMLL 82nd Anniversary Show on September 18, La Sombra lost his mask to Atlantis in a Lucha de Apuestas, thus forcing him to unmask and reveal his real name. Tensions between La Sombra and Rush led to a match between the two on November 13, which Rush won. After the match, which turned out to be La Sombra's last with CMLL, the two founding Los Ingobernables members made peace with each other.

=== New Japan Pro-Wrestling (2010–2015) ===
In May 2010, La Sombra embarked on his first tour of Japan for New Japan Pro-Wrestling (NJPW), participating in the annual Best of the Super Juniors tournament. With only three wins and a total of six points, he did not advance to the semi-finals. In November, La Sombra and Máscara Dorada took part in the Super J Tag League, winning two out of their four matches in the group stage and finishing third in their block, missing the finals. At Wrestle Kingdom V in Tokyo Dome on January 4, 2011, La Sombra and Dorada defeated Héctor Garza and Jushin Thunder Liger, who Sombra pinned. However, he failed to win Liger's CMLL World Middleweight Championship on January 22 at Fantastica Mania 2011. La Sombra returned in August to take part in the G1 Climax. He started with wins over Wataru Inoue and Strong Man, before losing his remaining seven matches in the tournament, finishing eighth out of the ten wrestlers in his block. In January 2012, he defeated Volador Jr. to retain the NWA World Historic Welterweight Championship during the Fantastica Mania 2012 tour. In April, he took part in the New Japan Cup, defeating Yoshi-Hashi in the first round before losing to Hirooki Goto in the second round.

During the second night of the Fantastica Mania 2013 tour in January 2013, La Sombra unsuccessfully challenged Shinsuke Nakamura for the IWGP Intercontinental Championship. However, he defeated Dragón Rojo Jr. to win the NWA World Historic Middleweight Championship on the third and final night. On May 31, La Sombra defeated Nakamura in Mexico City become the first Mexican IWGP Intercontinental Champion. On June 28, he retained the title against Volador Jr., who was disqualified when the referee noticed Volador Jr. holding La Sombra's mask after unmasking him. He lost the title back to Nakamura in Japan on July 20. Months later, La Sombra took part in the 2013 World Tag League, where he and Tetsuya Naito finished with a record of three wins and three losses, failing to advance to the semi-finals. In January 2014, La Sombra took part in the five-day Fantastica Mania 2014 tour. He returned in November to take part in the 2014 World Tag League, teaming with Naito once more. The team finished in the middle of their block with four wins and three losses. In January 2015, La Sombra took part in a tag team tournament during the Fantastica Mania 2015 tour, losing to Atlantis and Dorada in the first round.

=== WWE (2015–2021) ===
==== NXT (2015–2018) ====
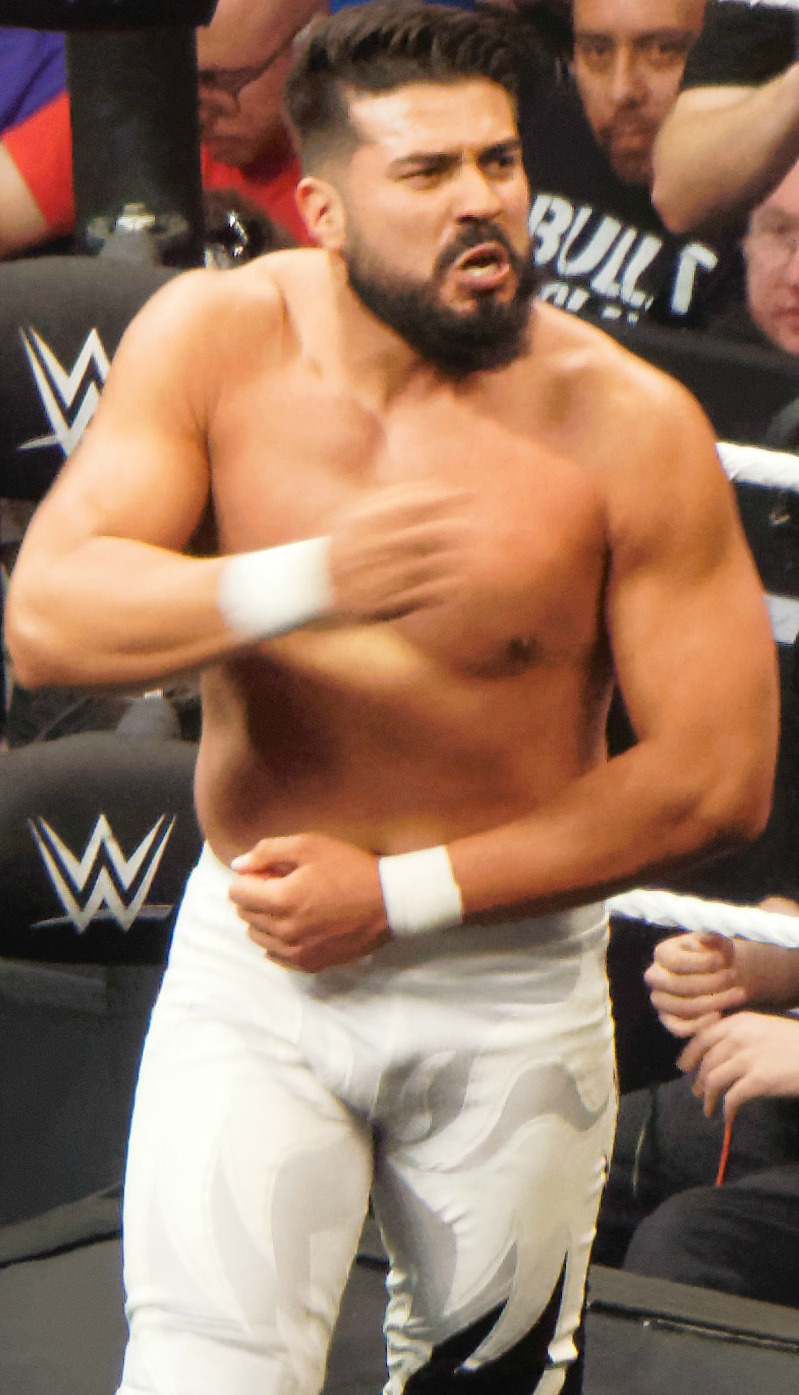
Manny Andrade at NXT TakeOver: Dallas in April 2016

On November 19, 2015, Andrade signed a developmental contract with WWE and reported to the WWE Performance Center in Orlando, Florida. He made his WWE in-ring debut at an NXT house show in Tampa on January 8, 2016, under the name "Manny Andrade", defeating Riddick Moss. In May, he was given the new ring name Andrade "Cien" ("100") Almas. At NXT TakeOver: The End on June 8, he defeated Tye Dillinger. At NXT TakeOver: Brooklyn II on August 20, Almas lost to debutant Bobby Roode. On the October 5 episode of NXT, after losing to The Revival in the first round of the Dusty Rhodes Tag Team Classic, Almas took out his frustration by attacking his tag team partner Cedric Alexander, turning heel in the process. By defeating No Way Jose on December 14 episode of NXT, Almas qualified for a fatal four-way match to determine a new number one contender to the NXT Championship, but was the first wrestler eliminated by Roderick Strong. He lost to Strong at NXT TakeOver: San Antonio on January 28, 2017, and the debuting Aleister Black at NXT TakeOver: Orlando on April 1.

On the July 19 episode of NXT, Almas appeared with an unidentified woman and attacked Cezar Bononi before threatening No Way Jose, but fled away when Jose ran back into the ring. After being absent from in-ring competition, Almas returned accompanied by the woman, who turned out to be his new manager Zelina Vega, defeating Jose on the August 9 episode of NXT and pacting a match at NXT TakeOver: Brooklyn III against Johnny Gargano on August 19, which Almas won. Almas returned on the October 11 episode of NXT, again defeating Gargano.

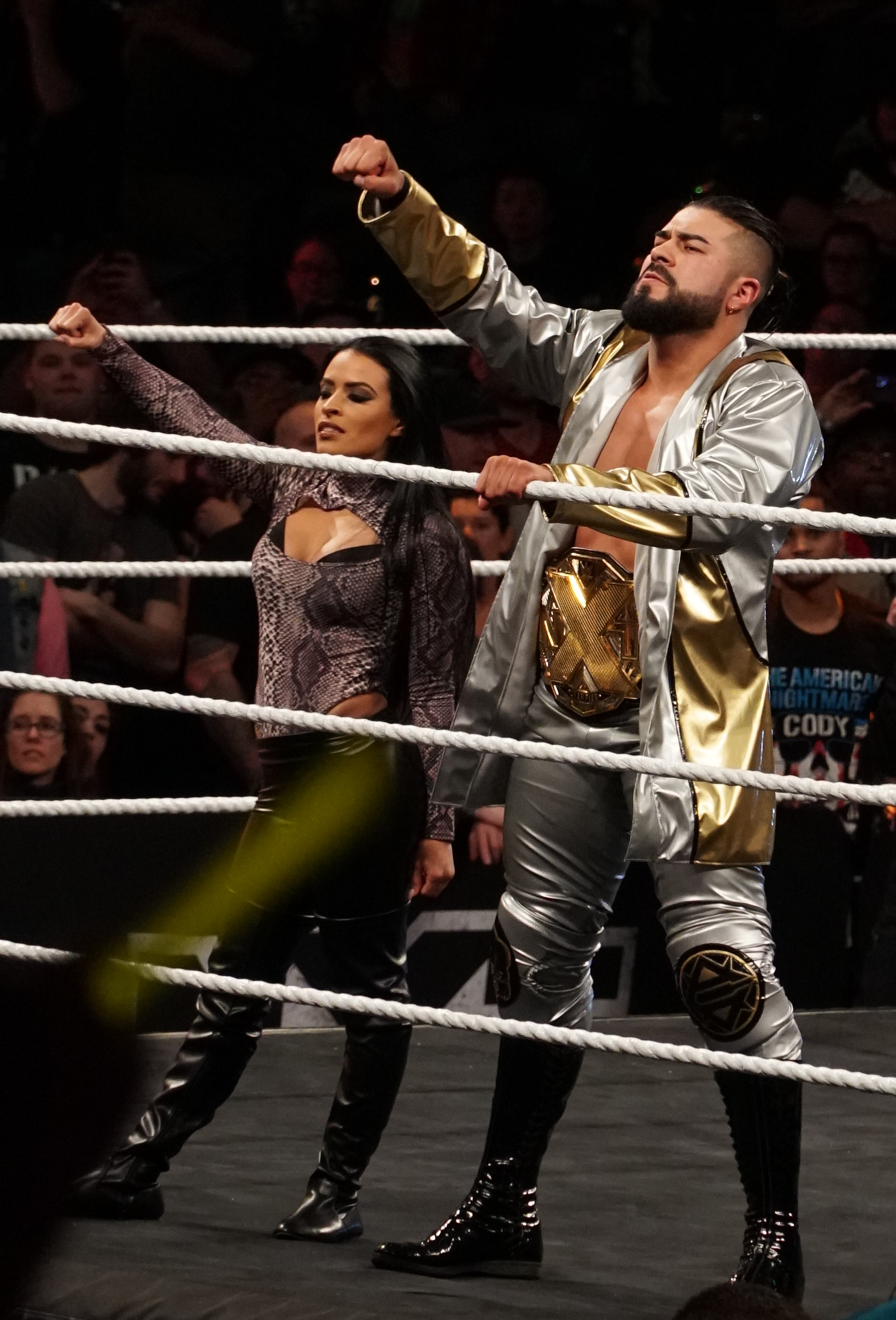
Almas (right) as the NXT Champion alongside his manager Zelina Vega at NXT TakeOver: New Orleans in April 2018

Shortly after, Almas began feuding with NXT Champion Drew McIntyre, leading to general manager William Regal scheduling a championship match at NXT TakeOver: WarGames on November 18, where Almas defeated McIntyre to become the new NXT Champion. On January 27, 2018, at NXT TakeOver: Philadelphia, Almas successfully defended the title against Gargano. The match was highly acclaimed, earning five stars from Wrestling Observer Newsletter journalist Dave Meltzer, making it the first match in NXT history to receive a five-star rating. At Royal Rumble the next night, Almas made his first main roster appearance, entering the Royal Rumble match as a surprise entrant at number 7, in which he eliminated Kofi Kingston before being eliminated by Randy Orton. On the February 21 episode of NXT, Almas retained the title against Gargano after interference from Tommaso Ciampa, forcing Gargano to leave NXT in storyline. At NXT TakeOver: New Orleans on April 7, Almas lost the NXT Championship to Black, ending his reign at 140 days. On the April 18 episode of NXT, Almas accompanied Vega during her first televised match against Candice LeRae, which she lost; this turned out to be Almas' and Vega's last appearances on NXT.

==== Various feuds (2018–2019) ====
On April 17, 2018, Almas, alongside Vega, was drafted to SmackDown brand as part of the Superstar Shake–up. A month later, in his in-ring debut, Almas defeated a local wrestler on the May 15 episode of SmackDown Live. He feuded with Sin Cara, defeating him on the July 10 episode of SmackDown Live and in a rematch five days later at the Extreme Rules kickoff show. On the July 17 episode of SmackDown Live, Almas suffered his first loss on the main roster to then–WWE Champion AJ Styles in a non–title match. Throughout August, Almas and Vega started a feud with Rusev and Lana, whom they defeated in various singles matches. They defeated Rusev and Lana in a mixed tag team match on the SummerSlam kickoff show on August 19, but lost a rematch two days later on SmackDown Live. On the November 6 episode of SmackDown Live, Almas lost to Rey Mysterio in a Survivor Series qualifying match.

In January 2019, his ring name was shortened to Andrade. He participated in the Royal Rumble on January 27, being eliminated near the end by Braun Strowman. A match between Andrade and Mysterio scheduled for the Fastlane kickoff show on March 10 was cancelled in favor of both men competing in a fatal four-way match for the United States Championship on the main show, where Samoa Joe retained in a match also involving R-Truth. At WrestleMania 35 on April 7, Andrade failed to win the André the Giant Memorial Battle Royal after accidentally eliminating himself while eliminating Apollo Crews. On April 15, Andrade and Vega were drafted to the Raw brand as part of the Superstar Shake-up, but were moved back to the SmackDown brand on April 23. At Money in the Bank on May 19, Andrade failed to win the namesake ladder match. At Super ShowDown on June 7, Andrade failed to capture the Intercontinental Championship from Finn Bálor. In August, he competed in the King of the Ring tournament, defeating Crews in the first round, but lost to Chad Gable in the quarterfinals.

==== United States Champion and teaming with Angel Garza (2019–2021) ====
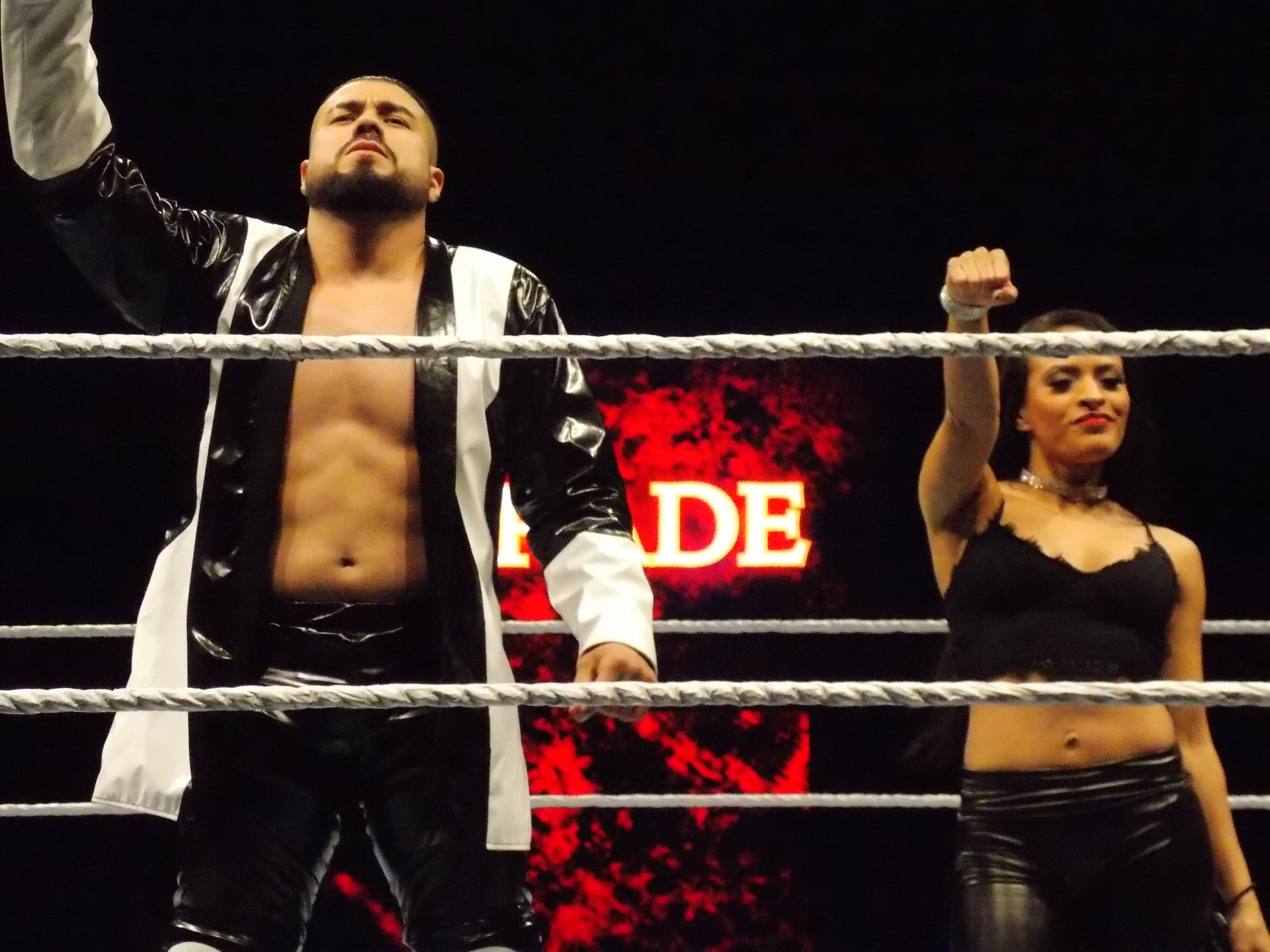
Almas, accompanied by Vega, prior to a match in August 2019

As part of the 2019 draft, Andrade and Vega were drafted to Raw. On December 26, at a house show in Madison Square Garden, Andrade defeated Mysterio to win the United States Championship. Entering 2020, Andrade successfully defended the title against Mysterio on the January 6 and 20 episodes of Raw, as well as Humberto Carrillo at Royal Rumble on January 26. The next day, Andrade was suspended for 30 days for violating WWE's Wellness Policy. He was written off television via Carrillo delivering a hammerlock DDT on Andrade onto cement on Raw. During his absence, Vega introduced her new associate, Angel Garza (Carrillo's cousin). Andrade returned at Super ShowDown on February 27, where he was eliminated by R-Truth in a gauntlet match for the Tuwaiq Trophy. At Elimination Chamber on March 8, he again retained his title against Carrillo.

Andrade and Garza were scheduled to face The Street Profits (Angelo Dawkins and Montez Ford) for the Raw Tag Team Championship at WrestleMania 36, but Andrade was removed from the match due to an injury and was replaced by Austin Theory. On the April 13 episode of Raw, Andrade, Garza and Theory attacked Akira Tozawa, creating a new faction, only for Theory to be kicked out of the faction on the May 18 episode of Raw. The following week on Raw, Andrade lost the United States Championship to Crews, ending his reign at 151 days. He failed to regain the title from Crews at Backlash on June 14. Andrade and Garza unsuccessfully challenged The Street Profits for their title at SummerSlam on August 23 and Clash of Champions on September 27. On the October 12 episode of Raw, Andrade lost to Garza before allowing him and Vega to be attacked by The Fiend and Alexa Bliss, splitting up the team in what was Andrade's final appearance in his first WWE tenure. In March 2021, Andrade requested his release from WWE and was initially denied, but WWE eventually granted his release on March 21.

=== Lucha Libre AAA Worldwide (2021–2022) ===
On May 2, 2021, at Lucha Libre AAA Worldwide (AAA)'s Rey de Reyes ("King of Kings"), Andrade appeared via video package, challenging AAA Mega Champion Kenny Omega to a championship match at Triplemanía XXIX, which was then made official. At the event on August 14, Andrade, accompanied by Ric Flair, failed to win the title. He returned at Triplemanía XXX: Monterrey on April 30, 2022, teaming with Cibernético and Deonna Purrazzo in a loss to Bandido, Pagano and Taya.

=== All Elite Wrestling (2021–2023) ===
Andrade, under the new ring name "Andrade El Ídolo", made his debut for All Elite Wrestling (AEW) on the June 4, 2021 episode of Dynamite, allying himself with Vickie Guerrero, who would serve as his manager. At Road Rager on July 7, Andrade defeated Matt Sydal in his AEW in-ring debut. Later that month, Andrade ended his affiliation with Vickie, introducing Chavo Guerrero as his new "executive consultant", only to attack Chavo after defeating Pac on the September 10 episode of Rampage. On the October 6 episode of Dynamite, he competed in a Casino Ladder match for an opportunity at the AEW World Championship, which was won by Adam Page. At Full Gear on November 13, Andrade and Malakai Black lost to Cody Rhodes and Pac. He lost to Rhodes in an Atlanta Street Fight on the December 1 episode of Dynamite.

In January 2022, Andrade joined the Hardy Family Office, which was renamed the Andrade Hardy Family Office (AHFO). He unsuccessfully challenged Sammy Guevara for the AEW TNT Championship twice over the next two months. At Revolution on March 6, Andrade teamed with stablemates Matt Hardy and Isiah Kassidy in a loss to Darby Allin, Guevara and Sting. On the following episode of Dynamite, Andrade kicked Hardy out of the AHFO. The stable quietly disbanded at Double or Nothing on May 29, as Andrade introduced a debuting Rush as his tag team partner as part of La Faccion Ingobernable (LFI). At All Out on September 4, he failed to win the Casino Ladder match. On October 5, it was reported that Andrade was sent home after a legitimate backstage altercation with Guevara. On November 28, Andrade revealed that he underwent surgery for a torn pectoral muscle, sidelining him for an unknown period of time.

Andrade returned from injury as a face on the debut episode of Collision on June 17, 2023, defeating Buddy Matthews. In November, he was announced as a participant in the inaugural Continental Classic. Participating in the Blue League, Andrade finished the tournament with nine points after three wins and two losses, narrowly failing to qualify for the semi-finals after losing a tiebreaker to Eddie Kingston. Andrade made his final appearance on AEW programming in his first tenure at Worlds End on December 30, losing to Miro. His contract would expire at the end of 2023, which was confirmed by Tony Khan on the post-show media scrum.

=== Independent circuit (2021–2023) ===
On June 12, 2021, Andrade made his first post-WWE appearance for RGR Lucha Libre, teaming with Piloto Suicda and VIP to defeat El Hijo del Santo, Misterioso and Rey Leon. At Ric Flair's Last Match on July 31, 2022, Andrade teamed with Ric Flair in Flair's retirement match to defeat Jay Lethal and Jeff Jarrett. On August 6, he lost to Carlito in the main event of World Wrestling Council (WWC)'s 49th anniversary show. On December 9, 2023, Andrade made his debut for Game Changer Wrestling (GCW) at Highest In The Room 2, defeating Joey Janela.

=== Return to CMLL (2023, 2026) ===
On December 15, 2023, Oropeza, under his Andrade persona, made his return to CMLL after eight years, teaming with Ángel de Oro and Soberano Jr. to defeat Atlantis Jr., Mistico and Star Jr. He reignited his feud with Volador Jr., leading to a singles match on December 29, which Andrade lost. On September 18, 2026, Andrade returned to CMLL after nearly three years, defeating Volador Jr. at the CMLL 93rd Anniversary Show.

=== Return to WWE (2024–2025) ===
Andrade made his return to WWE on January 27, 2024, at the Royal Rumble as a surprise entrant in the Royal Rumble match, where he was eliminated by Bronson Reed, after which he signed with the Raw brand. On the April 5 episode of SmackDown, Andrade saved Rey Mysterio from an attack by Dominik Mysterio and Santos Escobar, establishing himself as a face. The next night, Andrade and Rey defeated Dominik and Escobar on Night 1 of WrestleMania XL. On April 26, Andrade was drafted to the SmackDown brand during the WWE Draft. During a WWE Speed taping on June 7, Andrade defeated Ricochet to win the WWE Speed Championship, which he lost on the November 15 taping to Dragon Lee (his win and loss were aired on June 14 and November 20). At Money in the Bank on July 6, Andrade failed to win the namesake ladder match. Following the event, Andrade feuded with Carmelo Hayes, with the two having won three matches against each other by the end of September. Their game seven match on October 25, which was also for a United States Championship opportunity, ended in a no contest after special guest referee LA Knight attacked both men, ending their best-of-seven series match at three wins, three losses and one draw each. Andrade failed to win the title in a triple threat match at Crown Jewel on November 2, after Knight pinned Hayes.

On June 7, 2025, at Money in the Bank, Andrade competed in his second consecutive Money in the Bank ladder match, but failed to win. He then formed a tag team with Rey Fénix, competing in a six-pack tag team Tables, Ladders, and Chairs match for the WWE Tag Team Championship on Night 2 of SummerSlam on August 3, but lost in what was Andrade's final match in WWE. Andrade departed WWE on September 13, reportedly "due to numerous WWE Wellness violations over the last year". Andrade would later dispute the report, stating that he felt uncomfortable with remaining in WWE following his divorce with Charlotte Flair and requested his release after being asked to return to Lucha Libre AAA Worldwide following WWE's acquisition of the promotion.

On October 16, it was reported by Wrestling Observer Newsletter that Andrade had violated a non-compete clause due to his appearance for AEW, which took effect upon his termination from WWE. In a November interview with DeporTV, Andrade claimed that his lawyers were in discussions with WWE regarding the clause, which would keep him out of the ring for up to a year. On December 22, Fightful Select reported that the clause had been waived and Andrade was free to sign elsewhere.

=== Return to AEW (2025–present) ===
==== Don Callis Family (2025–2026) ====
On October 1, 2025, at the sixth anniversary episode of Dynamite, Andrade El Ídolo made his surprise return to AEW as a heel, where he attacked Kenny Omega and joined the Don Callis Family. However, he was removed from television and creative plans after WWE sent a cease-and-desist letter to AEW that claimed that his appearance violated a non-compete clause that took effect upon his termination.

After his non-compete clause was waived in December, Andrade returned to AEW television on the January 7, 2026 episode of Dynamite, officially re-signing with the promotion and resuming his role as a member of the Don Callis Family. Andrade defeated Swerve Strickland and Omega in back-to-back matches on Dynamite to advance to an AEW World Championship number one contender's match at Grand Slam Australia on February 14, which he lost to Adam Page. In the following months, Andrade began teasing a face turn by showing respect to Darby Allin after losing to him at Dynasty on April 12, while also displaying increasing frustration with Don Callis and the rest of the Don Callis Family. At Forbidden Door on June 28, Andrade cemented his face turn after betraying the Don Callis Family and MJF in their steel cage match against Mark Briscoe's team.

==== United Empire (2026–present) ====
Andrade making his entrance as the AEW National Champion in August 2026

At Redemption on July 26, Andrade defeated Mark Davis to win the AEW National Championship and his first championship in AEW. At Grand Slam Mexico on August 5, Andrade defeated Komander and Tommaso Ciampa in a three-way match to become the first entrant in the Casino Gauntlet match at All In on August 30, where he won the match and earned a future AEW World Championship opportunity. After All In, Andrade was acknowledged as a member of the United Empire in AEW after predominantly representing the stable in New Japan Pro-Wrestling. Over the following weeks on Dynamite and Collision, Andrade would successfully defend his National Championship against the likes of Gabe Kidd, The Beast Mortos, Daniel Garcia, and Michael Oku. On September 26 at All Out, Andrade successfully defended his title against Pac, which would later be Pac's last match before his death the following day. On October 17 at WrestleDream, Andrade successfully defended his title against Tommaso Ciampa but would lose the title to Ciampa in a rematch Rock & Wrestling Rager special episode of Collision on November 7, ending his reign at 104 days.

=== Return to independent circuit (2025–present) ===
On October 3, 2025, Andrade defeated DMT Azul to win that year's The Crash Heavyweight Championship at a The Crash Lucha Libre event. Despite being under a non-compete clause, WWE allowed Andrade to wrestle for WWC on December 13, where he defeated Xavant to win the WWC Universal Heavyweight Championship. On February 7, 2026, Andrade appeared for the German Wrestling Federation (GWF) at Global Warning, defeating Rambo for the GWF World Championship. Andrade vacated the WWC Universal Heavyweight Championship on March 12, ending his reign at 89 days. He lost the GWF World Championship on April 19 at Mystery Mayhem to Ahura, ending his reign at 71 days. On May 15, Andrade defeated Guanchulo to win the Wrestling Knockout Chile (WKC) Championship.

=== Return to NJPW (2025–present) ===
On December 22, 2025, Orapeza made his first NJPW appearance since 2015 through a pre-recorded video, and his first appearance under his Andrade persona. He was revealed as a new member of the United Empire and announced as one of the mystery partners for their ten-man tag team match at Wrestle Kingdom 20 on January 4, 2026, where he and the group defeated Bullet Club War Dogs (David Finlay, Drilla Moloney and Gabe Kidd) and Unaffiliated (Hiromu Takahashi and Shingo Takagi). At The New Beginning in Osaka on February 11, Andrade defeated Kidd to earn an IWGP Global Heavyweight Championship match against Yota Tsuji at The New Beginning USA on February 27, where he failed to win the title. On Night 1 of Wrestling Dontaku on May 3, Andrade replaced an injured Kidd and defeated Tsuji in a rematch to win the title, but lost it 42 days later to Shota Umino at Dominion 6.14 in Osaka-jo Hall on June 14 in a three-way match also involving Moloney.

== Professional wrestling persona ==
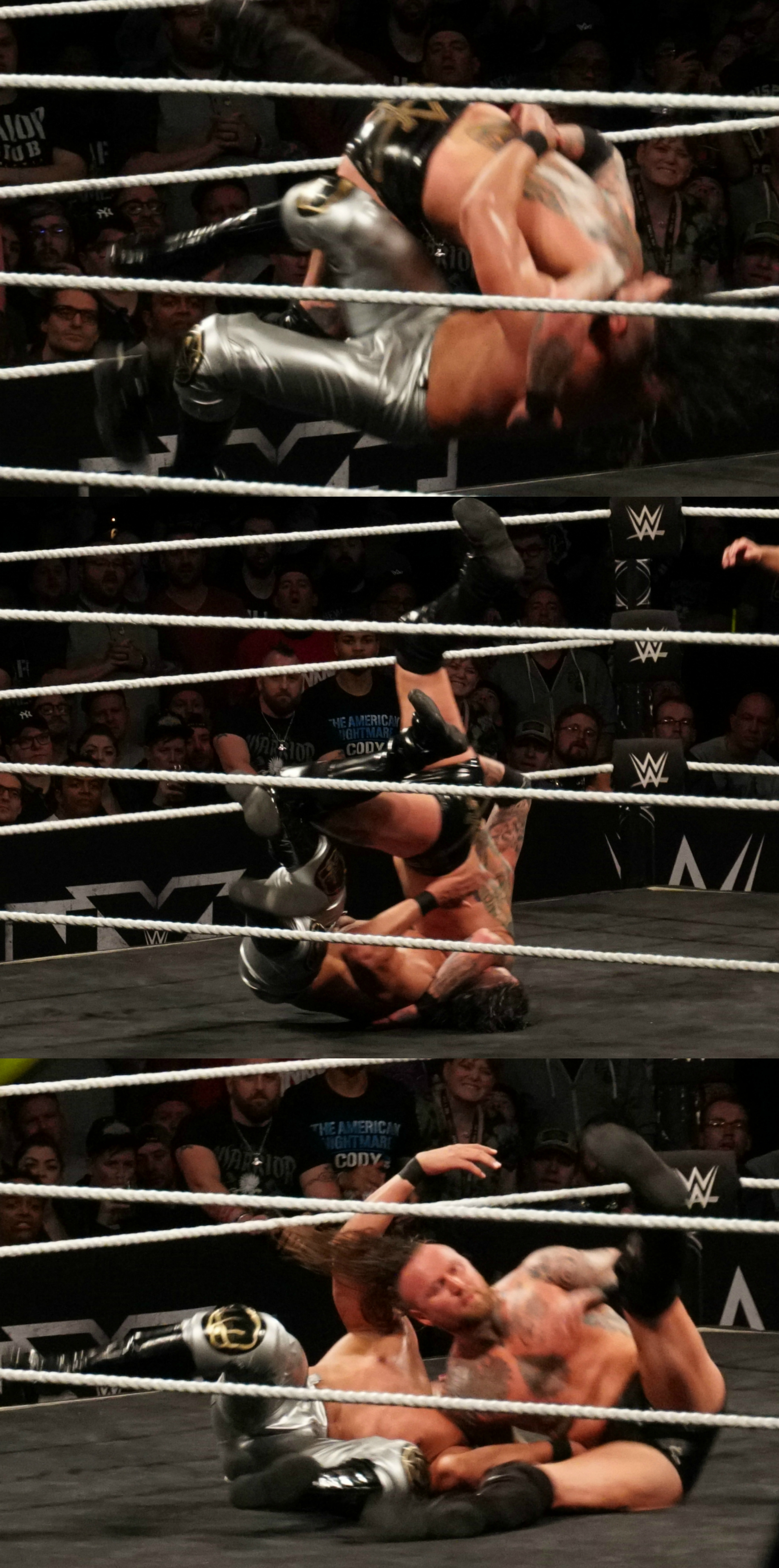
Almas performs a hammerlock DDT on Aleister Black

From 2007 through 2014, Andrade portrayed the masked character "La Sombra", a heroic, young, high-flying wrestler who used a lot of lucha libre moves, especially dives off the top rope and occasionally out of the ring to the floor. At the time, he often used a split-legged corkscrew senton dive off the top rope to finish his matches. When he turned from a face to a heel character in 2014, he developed a more individual personality, acting cockier, more laid back in the ring, and unimpressed with his opponents by adopting a more arrogant tranquilo attitude that became synonymous with all the Los Ingobernables members. As a heel, he began using the Sombra Driver (sometimes referred to as the Shadow Driver), a schoolboy suplex, that illustrated his transition from high-flyer to a more power-based wrestler.

Initially, the Andrade "Cien" Almas character was portrayed as a face, although without much depth to the character. His heel turn in 2016 saw a return of the arrogant tranquilo character he had used with success while working as "La Sombra", now bolstered by the presence of manager Zelina Vega, who helped him win matches by unfair means. After his heel turn, Andrade often used a running double knee smash against an opponent sitting in the corner of the ring, or sometimes on an opponent leaning against the ring post on the outside of the ring. After his heel turn, he began using a hammerlock DDT (which he named La Sombra) as a finisher. As of his debut at Road Rager in mid-2021, Andrade would enter the ring wearing a white suit with black stripes and a black skeleton mask, resembling DC Comics supervillain Black Mask. He began using a butterfly neckbreaker (which he named The Message in WWE and NJPW and The DM in AEW) as a finisher in early 2024. Starting in 2026, he would take a selfie with a female extra talent posing as a fan in the front row during his matches as a recurring gag.

== Other media ==
=== Video games ===
Maxxine Dupri in video games
Year	Title	Notes	Ref.
2018	WWE 2K19	Video game debut	
2019	WWE 2K20		
2020	WWE 2K Battlegrounds	Downloadable content	
2023	AEW Fight Forever		
2025	WWE 2K25		

== Personal life ==
In February 2019, Andrade began dating fellow professional wrestler Charlotte Flair. The couple got engaged on January 1, 2020, and married on May 27, 2022, in Torreón. In June 2024, Flair filed for divorce, which was finalized that October. In February 2025, Andrade revealed that he had a son.

== Championships and accomplishments ==
In AEW, Andrade is a one-time AEW National Champion

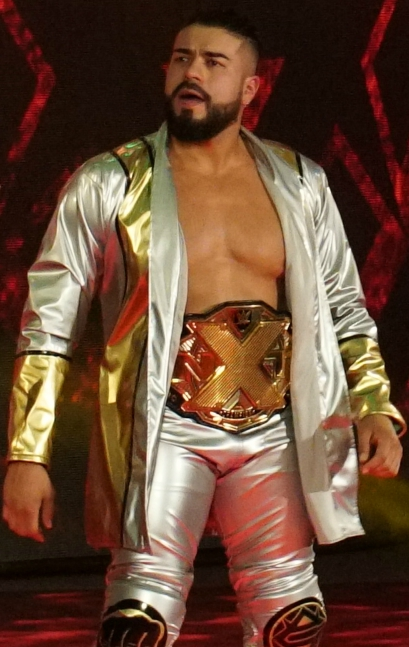
In WWE, Andrade is a one-time NXT Champion

- All Elite Wrestling
  - AEW National Championship (1 time)
- CBS Sports
  - NXT Match of the Year (2018) vs. Johnny Gargano at NXT TakeOver: Philadelphia
- Cinta de Oro Promotions
  - IOCW Championship (1 time)
- Consejo Mundial de Lucha Libre
  - CMLL Universal Championship (2011)
  - CMLL World Tag Team Championship (1 time) – with Volador Jr.
  - CMLL World Trios Championship (1 time) – with Máscara Dorada and La Máscara
  - Mexican National Trios Championship (1 time) – with El Sagrado and Volador Jr.
  - NWA World Welterweight Championship (1 time)
  - NWA World Historic Middleweight Championship (1 time)
  - NWA World Historic Welterweight Championship (2 times)
  - La Copa Junior (2012)
  - Cuadrangular de Parejas (2014) – with Omar Brunetti
  - Reyes del Aire (2013, 2015)
  - Torneo Corona (2008) – with Metalik
  - Torneo Gran Alternativa (2007) – with Místico
  - Torneo Nacional de Parejas Increibles (2013) – with Volador Jr.
  - CMLL Bodybuilding Contest (2008 - Intermediate; 2012 – Advanced)
  - CMLL Tag Team of the Year (2009) – with Volador Jr.
  - CMLL Técnico of the Year (2010)
  - CMLL Trio of the Year (2010) – with Máscara Dorada and La Máscara
- German Wrestling Federation
  - GWF World Championship (1 time)
- Lucha Libre Azteca
  - Azteca Championship (1 time)
- New Japan Pro-Wrestling
  - IWGP Global Heavyweight Championship (1 time)
  - IWGP Intercontinental Championship (1 time)
- Pro Wrestling Illustrated
  - Faction of the Year (2025) as part of the Don Callis Family
  - Ranked No. 13 of the top 500 singles wrestlers in the PWI 500 in 2018
- RGR Lucha Libre
  - RGR Supremo Championship (1 time)
- The Crash Lucha Libre
  - The Crash Heavyweight Championship (1 time, current)
- World Wrestling Council
  - WWC Universal Heavyweight Championship (1 time)
- Wrestling Knockout Chile
  - WKC Championship (1 time, current)
- WWE
  - NXT Championship (1 time)
  - WWE United States Championship (1 time)
  - WWE Speed Championship (1 time)
  - NXT Year-End Award for Match of the Year (2018) vs. Johnny Gargano for the NXT Championship at NXT TakeOver: Philadelphia
  - WWE Speed Championship #1 Contender Tournament (May 29–June 14, 2024)
- World Series Wrestling
  - WSW Tag Team Championship (1 time) – with Henare

== Luchas de Apuestas record ==
Winner (wager)	Loser (wager)	Location	Event	Date	Notes
Brillante Jr. (mask)	Zafiro (hair)	Gómez Palacio, Durango, Mexico	Live event	2006	
Brillante Jr. (mask)	Camorra (mask)	Torreón, Coahuila, Mexico	Live event	September 7, 2006	
La Sombra (mask)	El Felino (mask)	Mexico City	Homenaje a Dos Leyendas	March 19, 2010	(Note: First two men eliminated in a Relevos Suicida match that also included Místico and Volador Jr.)
La Sombra (mask)	Olímpico (mask)	Mexico City	CMLL 77th Anniversary Show	September 3, 2010	(Note: La Sombra and Olímpico were the last two men in a steel cage match that also included Atlantis, Último Guerrero, Jyushin Thunder Liger, Mr. Niebla, Averno, Mephisto, Ephesto, Místico, Volador Jr., Psicosis, Histeria and El Alebrije.)
La Sombra (mask)	Volador Jr. (mask)	Mexico City	CMLL 80th Anniversary Show	September 13, 2013	(Note: Sombra and Volador Jr. lost a Relevos suicida match to Atlantis and Último Guerrero to qualify for the Lucha de Apuestas match.)
Atlantis (mask)	La Sombra (mask)	Mexico City	CMLL 82nd Anniversary Show	September 18, 2015	
