= List of CMLL Super Viernes shows in 2019 =

List of Super Viernes professional wrestling shows in 2019

2019
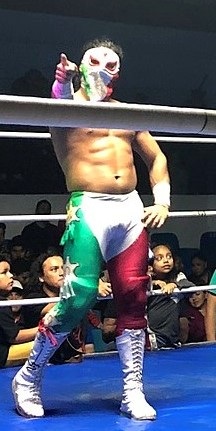
- Bandido, who made his CMLL debut on the last Super Viernes show.

CMLL Super Viernes shows chronology
← Previous; 2018	Next → 2020

CMLL Super Viernes is professional wrestling promotion Consejo Mundial de Lucha Libre's (CMLL) Friday night wrestling show that takes place in Arena México. The show is held every Friday night unless a Pay-Per-View or a supercard wrestling event is scheduled to take place on that night. CMLL began holding their weekly Friday night "Super Viernes" shows as far back as 1938 and continued the tradition through 2019. Some of the matches from Super Viernes were taped for CMLL's weekly shows that air in Mexico and the United States on various channels in the weeks following the Super Viernes show. The Super Viernes events featured a number of professional wrestling matches, in which some wrestlers were involved in pre-existing scripted feuds or storylines and others were teamed up with no backstory reason as such. Wrestlers themselves portrayed either "Rudos" or fan favorites ("Tecnicos" in Mexico) as they competed in matches with pre-determined outcomes.

CMLL presented a total of 49 Super Viernes shows. The only Fridays in 2019 to not feature a Super Viernes show was when CMLL held one of their signature events instead, which were annual Homenaje a Dos Leyendas, Juicio Final, and the CMLL 86th Anniversary Show. Super Viernes also hosted most of the major CMLL annual tournaments, which in 2019 included the, Torneo Gran Alternativa, Torneo de Parejas Increibles, the Universal Championship, Copa Dinastias, International Gran Prix, and La Copa Junior. The show also features a number of high-profile championship matches, a total of eight championship matches, with the NWA World Historic Welterweight Championship changed hands twice while both the CMLL World Tag Team Championship and CMLL World Trios Championship both change hands once. Super Viernes also saw successful defenses of the Mexican National Heavyweight Championship, CMLL World Middleweight Championship, the Rey del Inframundo title and the CMLL World Trios Championship. (Note: The statistics are supported by the source for each show.)

== Super Viernes shows of 2019 ==
#	Date	Main Event	Ref(s).
1	January 4	Nueva Generación Dinamitas (El Cuatrero, Forastero, Sansón) (c) vs. Ángel de Oro, Niebla Roja, Soberano Jr. in a six-man tag team match for the Mexican National Trios Championship	
2	January 11	Euforia, Niebla Roja, Valiente vs. La Bestia del Ring, Rush, Villano IV in a relevos increíbles match	
3	January 18	Diamante Azul, Niebla Roja, Valiente vs. Ephesto, Gilbert el Boricua, Mephisto	
4	January 25	Diamante Azul, King Phoenix, Penta 0M vs. La Bestia del Ring, Rush, El Terrible in a relevos increíbles match	
5	February 1	El Terrible vs. Dragon Lee in a CMLL Universal Championship semifinal	
6	February 8	Niebla Roja vs. Último Guerrero in a CMLL Universal Championship semifinal	
7	February 15	El Terrible vs. Niebla Roja in a CMLL Universal Championship final	
8	February 22	Carístico, Místico, Volador Jr. vs. Nueva Generación Dinamitas (El Cuatrero, Forastero, Sansón)	
9	March 1	La Bestia del Ring, Rush, El Terrible vs. Ángel de Oro, Niebla Roja, Volador Jr.	
10	March 8	Ángel de Oro, Carístico, Niebla Roja vs. La Bestia del Ring, Rush, El Terrible	
–	March 15	Replaced with the 2019 Homenaje a Dos Leyendas show	
11	March 22	Carístico, Diamante Azul, Volador Jr. vs. Los Guerreros Laguneros (Euforia, Gran Guerrero, Último Guerrero)	
12	March 29	Carístico, Valiente, Volador Jr. vs. Naito, Rush, El Terrible in a relevos increíbles match	
13	April 5	Gilbert el Boricua, La Bestia del Ring, El Terrible vs. Carístico, Valiente, Volador Jr.	
14	April 12	Volador Jr. vs. Gilbert el Boricua	
15	April 19	Último Guerrero and Volador Jr. vs. El Cuatrero and Místico in a Torneo Nacional de Parejas Increíbles tournament semifinal	
16	April 26	Bárbaro Cavernario and Titán vs. Último Guerrero and Volador Jr. in the Torneo Nacional de Parejas Increíbles 2019 final match	
17	May 3	Carístico, Valiente, Volador Jr. vs. La Bestia del Ring, Rush, El Terrible	
18	May 10	Dragon Lee, Místico, Volador Jr. vs. Bárbaro Cavernario, Mr. Niebla, Negro Casas	
19	May 17	Bárbaro Cavernario, and Nueva Generación Dinamitas (El Cuatrero and Sansón) vs. Carístico, Místico, Valiente	
20	May 24	Místico vs. Bárbaro Cavernario	
–	May 31	Replaced with the 2019 Juicio Final show	
21	June 7	La Bestia del Ring and Rush vs. Flyer and Volador Jr. in a Copa Dinastias semifinal tag team match	
22	June 14	Austin Theory, Carístico, and Volador Jr. vs. Rush and La Peste Negra (Bárbaro Cavernario and Negro Casas) in a Six-man tag team match	
23	June 21	Ángel de Oro and Niebla Roja vs. La Bestia del Ring and Rush in a Best two-out-of-three falls tag team match Copa Dinastias tournament final	
24	June 28	Carístico, Valiente, Volador Jr. vs. Bárbaro Cavernario, Mr. Niebla, Negro Casas	
25	July 5	Carístico, Valiente, Volador Jr. vs. Gilbert el Boricua, La Bestia del Ring, El Terrible	
26	July 12	Último Guerrero vs. Ciber the Main Man	
27	July 19	Jushin Thunder Liger vs. Carístico vs. Negro Casas vs. Último Guerrero in a Relevo CMLL match (Billed as the Jushin Thunder Liger Mexican Retirement Show)	
28	July 26	Nueva Generación Dinamitas (El Cuatrero, Forastero, Sansón) vs. Carístico, Místico, Volador Jr.	
29	August 2	Nueva Generación Dinamitas (El Cuatrero, Forastero, Sansón) vs. Carístico, Místico, Volador Jr.	
30	August 9	Los Guerreros Laguneros (Euforia and Gran Guerrero) and Forastero vs. Diamante Azul, Dragon Lee, Volador Jr.	
31	August 16	Dragon Lee, Místico, Último Guerrero vs. Carístico, Ciber the Main Man, Valiente in a relevos increíbles match	
32	August 23	Bárbaro Cavernario, Diamante Azul, Último Guerrero vs. Ciber the Main Man, The Chris, Valiente in a relevos increíbles match	
33	August 30	Team Mexico (Bárbaro Cavernario, El Cuatrero, Diamante Azul, Dragon Lee, Rush, Volador Jr. and Soberano Jr.) and Team Resto del Mundo (Big Daddy, Jay Briscoe, Delirious, Luke Hawx, Kenny King, Mecha Wolf 450, Matt Taven and Oraculo)	
34	September 6	Carístico, Dragon Lee, Místico vs. Nueva Generación Dinamitas (El Cuatrero, Forastero, Sansón)	
35	September 13	Bárbaro Cavernario, Ciber the Main Man, Diamante Azul vs. Gilbert el Boricua, Sansón, Último Guerrero	
36	September 20	Carístico, Místico, Valiente vs. Los Guerreros Laguneros (Euforia and Gran Guerrero) and Negro Casas	
–	September 27	Replaced with the CMLL 86th Anniversary Show	
37	October 4	Los Guerreros del Infierno (Euforia and Gran Guerrero) (c) vs.. Los Hermanos Chávez (Ángel de Oro and Niebla Roja) in a Best two-out-of-three falls tag team match for the CMLL World Tag Team Championship	
38	October 11	Carístico, Místico, and Volador Jr. vs. Nueva Generación Dinamitas (El Cuatrero and Sansón) and Último Guerrero in a Six-man tag team match	
39	October 18	Star Jr. and Valiente vs. Fugaz and Místico in the 2019 Gran Alternativa tournament final	
40	October 25	Carístico, Diamante Azul, Místico vs. Los Guerreros Laguneros (Euforia and Gran Guerrero) and Negro Casas	
41	November 1	La Alianza de Plata y Oro (Carístico and Místico) vs. Los Guerreros Lagunero (Euforia and Gran Guerrero) (c) in a Best two-out-of-three falls tag team match for the CMLL World Tag Team Championship (CMLL's 2019 Día de Muertos show)	
42	November 8	Carístico, Místico, Volador Jr. vs. Nueva Generación Dinamitas (El Cuatrero, Forastero, Sansón)	
43	November 15	Gran Guerrero, Negro Casas, Último Guerrero vs. Místico, Soberano Jr., Volador Jr.	
44	November 22	Gran Guerrero, Negro Casas, Último Guerrero vs. Místico, Soberano Jr., Volador Jr.	
45	November 29	Carístico, Felino, Último Guerrero vs. Ángel de Oro, Bárbaro Cavernario, Volador Jr. in a relevos increíbles match	
46	December 6	Rayo de Jalisco Jr., Tinieblas Jr., and Villano IV vs. El Canek, Fuerza Guerrera, and Máscara Año 2000 in a six-man tag team match (CMLL's 2019 Leyendas Mexicanas show)	
47	December 13	Carístico, Negro Casas, Valiente vs. Los Guerreros Laguneros (Euforia and Último Guerrero) and Soberano Jr. in a relevos increíbles match	
48	December 20	Carístico, Diamante Azul, Volador Jr. vs. Gilbert el Boricua, Negro Casas, Último Guerrero	
49	December 27	Nueva Generación Dinamitas (El Cuatrero and Forastero), and Gilbert el Boricua vs. Carístico, Bandido, Volador Jr.	
