= List of CMLL Super Viernes shows in 2020 =

List of Super Viernes professional wrestling shows in 2020

2020
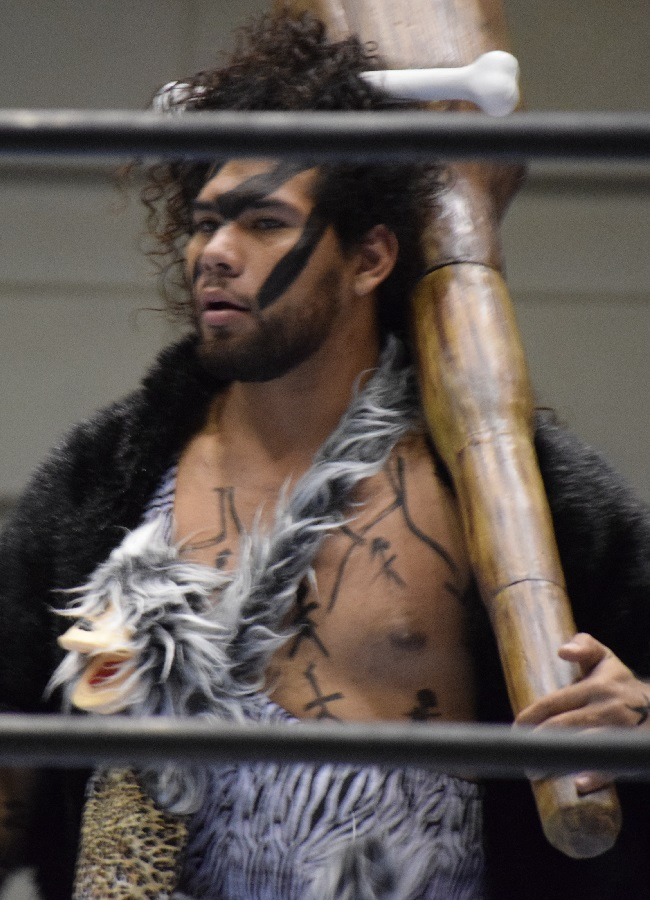
- Bárbaro Cavernario, featured in one of the major storylines of the early part of 2020

CMLL Super Viernes shows chronology
| ← Previous; 2019 | Next → 2021 |

CMLL Super Viernes is professional wrestling promotion Consejo Mundial de Lucha Libre's (CMLL) Friday night wrestling show that takes place in Arena México. The show is held every Friday night unless a Pay-Per-View or a supercard wrestling event is scheduled to take place on that night. CMLL began holding their weekly Friday night "Super Viernes" shows as far back as 1938 and continue the tradition through 2020 as well. Some of the matches from Super Viernes were taped for CMLL's weekly shows that air in Mexico and the United States on various channels in the weeks following the Super Viernes show. The Super Viernes events featured a number of professional wrestling matches, in which some wrestlers were involved in pre-existing scripted feuds or storylines and others were teamed up with no backstory reason as such. Wrestlers themselves portrayed either "Rudos" or fan favorites ("Tecnicos" in Mexico) as they competed in matches with predetermined outcomes.

The March 20 show was cancelled due to the COVID-19 pandemic, with the possibility that further Friday night shows would be cancelled for the same reason. It was originally scheduled to be CMLL's annual Homenaje a Dos Leyendas show. Super Viernes also hosted most of the major CMLL annual tournaments, which in 2020 so far has included the Torneo Nacional de Parejas Increíbles and the Mexican National Tag Team Championship tournament. (Note: The statistics are supported by the source for each show.)

== Super Viernes shows of 2020 ==
| # | Date | Main Event | Ref(s). |
|---|---|---|---|
| 1 | January 3 | Euforia, Gran Guerrero, and Último Guerrero vs. Ángel de Oro, Carístico, and Niebla Roja | |
| 2 | January 10 | Gran Guerrero, Shocker, and El Terrible vs. Diamante Azul, Místico, and Volador Jr. | |
| 3 | January 17 | Diamante Azul, Místico, and Volador Jr. vs. Gran Guerrero, Shocker, and El Terrible | |
| 4 | January 24 | El Felino, Último Guerrero, and Diamante Azul vs. Carístico, Bárbaro Cavernario and Valiente in a Relevos increíbles six-man tag team match (Billed as La Noche de Mr. Niebla) | |
| 5 | January 31 | Carístico, Bárbaro Cavernario, and Valiente vs. Diamante Azul, El Felino, and Último Guerrero in a six-man relevos increíbles match | |
| 6 | February 7 | Carístico, Valiente, and Volador Jr. vs. El Cuatrero, Forastero, and Sansón | |
| 7 | February 14 | Carístico and Forastero vs. Bandido and Último Guerrero in a Torneo Nacional de Parejas Increíbles semifinal match | |
| 8 | February 21 | Bárbaro Cavernario and Volador Jr. vs. Ángel de Oro and Sansón in a 2020 Torneo Nacional de Parejas Increíbles semifinal match | |
| 9 | February 28 | Carístico and Forastero vs. Bárbaro Cavernario and Volador Jr. in a 2020 Torneo Nacional Increible de Parejas final, best two-out-of-three tag team match | |
| 10 | March 6 | Carístico, Valiente, and Volador Jr. defeated Bárbaro Cavernario and Los Guerreros Lagunero (Euforia and Último Guerrero) in a Best two-out-of-three falls six-man tag team match | |
| 11 | March 13 | El Felino, Negro Casas, and Volador Jr. defeated Carístico, Bárbaro Cavernario, and Diamante Azul in a six-man relevos increíbles match | |
| – | March 20 | Cancelled due to the COVID-19 pandemic, originally scheduled to be the 2020 Homenaje a Dos Leyendas | |
| | March 27 | Cancelled due to the COVID-19 pandemic | |
| | April 3 | Cancelled due to the COVID-19 pandemic | |
| | April 10 | Cancelled due to the COVID-19 pandemic | |
| | April 17 | Cancelled due to the COVID-19 pandemic | |
| | April 24 | Cancelled due to the COVID-19 pandemic | |
| | May 1 | Cancelled due to the COVID-19 pandemic | |
| | May 8 | Cancelled due to the COVID-19 pandemic | |
| | May 15 | Cancelled due to the COVID-19 pandemic | |
| | May 22 | Cancelled due to the COVID-19 pandemic | |
| | May 29 | Cancelled due to the COVID-19 pandemic | |
| | June 5 | Cancelled due to the COVID-19 pandemic | |
| | June 12 | Cancelled due to the COVID-19 pandemic | |
| | June 19 | Cancelled due to the COVID-19 pandemic | |
| | June 26 | Cancelled due to the COVID-19 pandemic | |
| | July 3 | Cancelled due to the COVID-19 pandemic | |
| | July 10 | Cancelled due to the COVID-19 pandemic | |
| | July 17 | Cancelled due to the COVID-19 pandemic | |
| | July 24 | Cancelled due to the COVID-19 pandemic | |
| | July 31 | Cancelled due to the COVID-19 pandemic | |
| | August 7 | Cancelled due to the COVID-19 pandemic | |
| | August 14 | Cancelled due to the COVID-19 pandemic | |
| | August 21 | Cancelled due to the COVID-19 pandemic | |
| | August 28 | Cancelled due to the COVID-19 pandemic | |
| 12 | September 4 | Bárbaro Cavernario vs. El Felino | |
| 13 | September 11 | Los Guerreros Laguneros (Euforia and Gran Guerrero) and Sansón vs. Bandido, Flyer, and Volador Jr. | |
| 14 | September 18 | Volador Jr. vs. Gran Guerrero | |
| – | September 25 | Replaced by the CMLL 87th Anniversary Show | |
| | October 2 | Mexican National Women's Tag Team Championship tournament Block A | |
| | October 9 | Mexican National Women's Tag Team Championship tournament Block B | |
| | October 16 | Mexican National Women's Tag Team Championship tournament finals | |
| | October 23 | CMLL Rey del Inframundo qualifier | |
| | October 30 | 2020 Día de Muertos show | |
| | November 6 | To be announced | |
| | November 13 | To be announced | |
| | November 20 | To be announced | |
| | November 27 | To be announced | |
| | December 4 | To be announced | |
| | December 11 | To be announced | |
| | December 18 | To be announced | |
| | December 25 | To be announced | |
