= Copa Dinastías (2019) =

2019 professional wrestling tournament

- The poster for the finals of the tournament
- Promotion: Consejo Mundial de Lucha Libre
- Date: June 7, 2019; June 14, 2019; June 21, 2019
- City: Mexico City, Mexico
- Venue: Arena México

Event chronology
← Previous; Juicio Final	Next → Jushin Thunder Liger Mexican Retirement Show

Copa Dinastías (2019) (Spanish for "The Dynasties Cup) is a professional wrestling held by the Mexican professional wrestling company Consejo Mundial de Lucha Libre (CMLL) from June 7 through June 21, 2019. For the tournament, eight tag teams competed in a single elimination tournament, with the preliminary rounds taking place on June 7 and 14, with the final match on June 21. All teams were made up of family members.

The finals came down to the father/son team of La Bestia del Ring and Rush facing Los Hermanos Chavez (The Chavez Brothers) Ángel de Oro and Niebla Roja. After three falls, Los Hermanos Chavez won the match and the cup.

== Production ==
=== Background ===
For many Lucha libre is a family tradition, with second, third and fourth-generation wrestlers competing over the years. The Mexican professional wrestling company Consejo Mundial de Lucha Libre (CMLL; "World Wrestling Council") features a number of relatives on their roster and have for decades held various tournaments based on family relationships. The most widely promoted tournament is the La Copa Junior, a tournament for second, or more, generation wrestlers competing. In 1995, CMLL held a Second Generation Tag Team Tournament, where each team member was a second-generation wrestler, albeit not related to each other.

=== Storylines ===
The Copa Dinastías tournament featured various professional wrestling matches with different wrestlers involved in pre-existing scripted feuds, plots and storylines. Wrestlers were portrayed as either heels (referred to as rudos in Mexico, those that portray the "bad guys") or faces (técnicos in Mexico, the "good guy" characters) as they followed a series of tension-building events, which culminated in a wrestling match or series of matches.

Tournament participants

- Ángel de Oro and Niebla Roja – brothers
- La Bestia del Ring and Rush – father/son
- Dragon Lee and Místico – brothers
- Euforia and Soberano Jr. – father/son
- El Felino and Negro Casas – brothers
- Gran Guerrero and Último Guerrero – brothers
- Máscara Año 2000 and Sansón – uncle/nephew
- Volador Jr. and Flyer uncle/nephew

Tournament brackets

Quarterfinals
La Familia Real (Flyer and Volador Jr.)	W
La Peste Negra (El Felino and Negro Casas)
Los Ingobernables (La Bestia del Ring and Rush)	W
Euforia and Soberano Jr.
Hermanos Chavez (Ángel de Oro and Niebla Roja)	W
Los Guerreros del Infierno (Gran Guerrero and Último Guerrero)
Hermanos Muñoz (Dragon Lee and Místico)	W
Los Dínamitas (Máscara Año 2000 and Sansón)

Semifinals
Los Ingobernables	W
La Familia Real
Hermanos Chavez	W
Hermanos Muñoz

Finals
Los Ingobernables
Hermanos Chavez	W

== Super Viernes shows ==
=== June 7, 2019 ===
No.	Results	Stipulations	Times
1	El Coyote and Grako defeated Eléctrico and Oro Jr.	Best two-out-of-three falls tag team match	12:19
2	Black Panther, Blue Panther, and Blue Panther Jr. defeated Disturbio, Kawato San, and Virus	Six-man "Lucha Libre rules" tag team match	16:29
3	Audaz, Stuka Jr., and Valiente defeated Rey Bucanero and Los Hijos del Infierno (Ephesto and Mephisto)	Six-man "Lucha Libre rules" tag team match	11:07
4	Bárbaro Cavernario defeated Templario	Lightning match (One fall, 10 minute time limit)	09:45
5	Gilbert el Boricua and Los Guerreros Lagunero (Gran Guerrero and Último Guerrero) defeated Carístico and Los Hermanos Chavez (Ángel de Oro and Niebla Roja)	Six-man "Lucha Libre rules" tag team match	13:57
6	La Bestia del Ring and Soberano Jr. defeated El Felino and Flyer	Copa Dinastias seeding battle royal	01:24
7	Flyer and Volador Jr. defeated El Felino and Negro Casas	Copa Dinastias quarterfinal tag team match	06:34
8	La Bestia del Ring and Rush defeated Euforia and Soberano Jr.	Copa Dinastias quarterfinal tag team match	07:10
9	La Bestia del Ring and Rush defeated Flyer and Volador Jr.	Copa Dinastias semifinal tag team match	05:36

=== June 14, 2019 ===
No.	Results	Stipulations	Times
1	Magia Blanca and Star Jr. defeated La Ola Negra (Akuma and Espanto Jr.)	Best two-out-of-three falls tag team match	10:25
2	Esfinge, Rey Cometa, and Tritón defeated Kawato San, Pólvora, and Tiger by disqualification	Six-man "Lucha Libre rules" tag team match	10:52
3	Atlantis Jr., Soberano Jr., and Valiente defeated El Hijo del Villano III and Sangre Dinamita (El Cuatrero and Forastero)	Six-man "Lucha Libre rules" tag team match	14:09
4	Euforia defeated Rey Bucanero	Lightning match (One fall, 10 minute time limit)	08:47
5	Dragon Lee and Sansón defeated Ángel de Oro and Gran Guerrero	Copa Dinastias seeding battle royal	01:24
6	Ángel de Oro and Niebla Roja defeated Gran Guerrero and Último Guerrero	Copa Dinastias quarterfinal tag team match	05:51
7	Dragon Lee and Místico defeated Máscara Año 2000 and Sansón	Copa Dinastias quarterfinal tag team match	04:40
8	Ángel de Oro and Niebla Roja defeated Dragon Lee and Místico	Copa Dinastias semifinal tag team match	12:35
9	Austin Theory, Carístico, and Volador Jr. defeated Rush and La Peste Negra (Bárbaro Cavernario and Negro Casas)	Six-man "Lucha Libre rules" tag team match	09:32

=== June 21, 2019 ===
No.	Results	Stipulations	Times
1	La Ola Negra (Espíritu Negro and El Hijo del Signo) defeated Robin and Súper Astro Jr.	Best two-out-of-three falls tag team match	10:28
2	Drone, Fuego, and Tritón defeated Disturbio, Tiger, and Virus	Six-man "Lucha Libre rules" tag team match	14:17
3	Hechicero, Kawato San, and Templario defeated Audaz, Flyer, and Soberano Jr.	Six-man "Lucha Libre rules" tag team match	16:53
4	Negro Casas defeated Titán	Lightning match (One fall, 10 minute time limit)	06:32
5	Gilbert el Boricua and The Cl4n (Ciber the Main Man and The Chris) defeated Los Guerreros Lagunero (Euforia, Gran Guerrero, and Último Guerrero)	Six-man "Lucha Libre rules" tag team match	13:11
6	Ángel de Oro and Niebla Roja defeated La Bestia del Ring and Rush	Best two-out-of-three falls tag team match Copa Dinastias tournament final	21:15
