= List of CMLL Super Viernes shows in 2021 =

List of Super Viernes professional wrestling shows in 2021

2020

CMLL Super Viernes shows chronology
← Previous; 2020	Next → 2022

CMLL Super Viernes is professional wrestling promotion Consejo Mundial de Lucha Libre's (CMLL) Friday night wrestling show that takes place in Arena México. The show is held every Friday night unless a Pay-Per-View or a supercard wrestling event is scheduled to take place on that night. CMLL began holding their weekly Friday night "Super Viernes" shows as far back as 1938 and continue the tradition through 2020 as well. Some of the matches from Super Viernes were taped for CMLL's weekly shows that air in Mexico and the United States on various channels in the weeks following the Super Viernes show. The Super Viernes events featured a number of professional wrestling matches, in which some wrestlers were involved in pre-existing scripted feuds or storylines and others were teamed up with no backstory reason as such. Wrestlers themselves portrayed either "Rudos" or fan favorites ("Tecnicos" in Mexico) as they competed in matches with predetermined outcomes.

== Super Viernes shows of 2021 ==
#	Date	Main Event	Ref(s).
1	September 3	Volador Jr. vs. Gemelo Diablo I vs. Audaz vs. Cancerbero vs. Dragon Rojo Jr. vs. Guerrero Maya Jr. vs. Hechicero vs. Mephisto vs. Místico vs. Star Jr. vs. Último Guerrero vs. Valiente in a Copa Indepencia Twelve Man Elimination Semi Final Match	
2	September 10	Gran Guerrero vs. Gemelo Diablo II vs. Atlantis Jr. vs. Negro Casas vs. Black Panther vs. El Terrible vs. Euforia vs. Fugaz vs. Virus vs. Stuka Jr. vs. Rey Cometa vs. Ángel de Oro in a Copa Indepencia Twelve Man Elimination Semi Final Match	
3	October 1	Místico, Volador Jr. and Atlantis Jr. vs. Hechicero, Euforia and Dragon Rojo Jr. in a Best Two Out Of Three Falls Six Man Tag Team Match	
4	October 8	Dark Silueta vs.La Amapola vs. Jarochita vs. Lluvia vs. Marcela vs. Princesa Sugehit vs. Reina Isis vs. Avispa Dorada vs. Dalys la Caribena vs. Sonya vs. Stephanie Vaquer vs. Momo Kohgo vs. Tsukasa Fujimoto vs. Tsukushi in a CMLL International Women's Grand Prix Torneo Cibernetico Match	
5	October 15	Los Guerreros Laguneros (Gran Guerrero and Último Guerrero) and Templario vs. Místico, Volador Jr. and Titán in a Best Two Out Of Three Falls Six Man Tag Team Match	
6	October 22	Volador Jr. and Titán vs. Templario and TJP in a Best Two Out Of Three Falls Tag Team Match	
7	October 29	Los Guerreros Laguneros (Gran Guerrero and Último Guerrero) and Templario vs. Místico, Volador Jr. and Titán in a Best Two Out Of Three Falls Six Man Tag Team Match	
8	November 5	El Terrible (c) vs. Atlantis Jr. for the CMLL Rey Del Inframundo Championship	
9	November 12	Hechicero (c) vs. Bárbaro Cavernario in a Best Two Out Of Three Falls Match for the CMLL World Heavyweight Championship	
10	November 19	United Empire (Jeff Cobb and TJP) vs. Atlantis Jr. and Volador Jr. in a Best Two Out Of Three Falls Tag Team Match	
11	November 26	Volador Jr. (c) vs. TJP in a Best Two Out Of Three Falls Match for the NWA World Historic Welterweight Championship	
12	December 3	Soberano Jr. vs. Templario vs. Dragón Rojo, Jr. vs. Espíritu Negro vs. Felino Jr. vs. Guerrero Maya Jr. vs. Star Jr. vs. Virus in a CMLL World Middleweight Championship #1 Contendership Torneo Cibernetico	
13	December 10	Averno, El Terrible and Ángel de Oro vs. Místico, Fugaz and Star Jr. in a Best Two Out Of Three Falls Six Man Tag Team Match	
14	December 17	Averno, Bárbaro Cavernario and Templario vs. Místico, Volador Jr. and Soberano Jr. in a Best Two Out Of Three Falls Six Man Tag Team Match	
