= Verano de Escándalo (2022) =

2022 Lucha Libre AAA Worldwide event

- Promotional poster featuring various AAA luchadores and luchadoras
- Promotion: Lucha Libre AAA Worldwide
- Date: August 5, 2022
- City: Aguascalientes, Mexico
- Venue: Arena San Marcos

Event chronology
| ← Previous; Triplemanía XXX | Next → Super Series |

Verano de Escándalo chronology
| ← Previous; 2021 | Next → 2023 |

Verano de Escándalo (Spanish for "Summer of Scandal") was a major professional wrestling event that was produced by the Mexican Lucha Libre AAA Worldwide (AAA) promotion, which took place on August 5, 2022, at Arena San Marcos in Aguascalientes, Mexico. The Verano de Escándalo event is a regular summer event for AAA since 1997, with the promotion only skipping the event in 2012, 2013, 2016, and 2020. The 2022 event marked the 22nd time AAA has used that name for an event.

== Production ==
=== Background ===
In September 1997 Mexican professional wrestling, company Asistencia Asesoría y Administración, later known as simply AAA and then Lucha Libre AAA Worldwide, added a new major event to their schedule as they held the first ever Verano de Escándalo ("Summer of Scandal") show on September 14, 1997. The Verano de Escándalo show became an annual event from 1997 until 2011, usually held in September, with few exceptions. In 2012 AAA changed their major event schedule as they pushed Triplemanía XX to August instead of holding the show in June or July as had been the case up until 2012. With the change to the schedule AAA did not hold a Verano de Escándalo show in 2012 and 2013. In 2014 the show was put back on the schedule, but held in June instead, filling the void left when Triplemanía was moved. AAA did not hold a Verano de Escándalo in 2016, instead holding the Lucha Libre World Cup in June. A Verano de Escándalo show was not held in 2020 due to the COVID-19 pandemic. The 2022 Verano de Escándalo show was the 22nd show in the series.

=== Storylines ===
The 2022 Verano de Escándalo show featured six professional wrestling matches with different wrestlers involved in pre-existing, scripted feuds, plots, and storylines. Wrestlers portrayed either heels (referred to as rudos in Mexico, those that portray the "bad guys") or faces (técnicos in Mexico, the "good guy" characters) as they followed a series of tension-building events, which culminated in a wrestling match or series of matches.

== Results ==
| No. | Results | Stipulations | Times |
|---|---|---|---|
| 1 | Mr. Iguana, Aramís, and Niño Hamburguesa (with Micro Man) defeated El Imperio de Las Shotas (Jessy, Dulce Canela, and La Diva Salvaje) | Trios match | — |
| 2 | Nueva Generación Dinamita (El Cuatrero, Sansón, and Forastero) defeated La Empresa (DMT Azul, Puma King and Sam Adonis) (c) | Trios match for the AAA World Trios Championship | — |
| 3 | Bandido defeated Rey Horus, Laredo Kid and Willie Mack | Four-way match | 11:59 |
| 4 | Charly Manson, Pagano, and Psycho Clown defeated Los Vipers (Cibernético, Psicosis, and Abismo Negro Jr.) | Trios match | 14:48 |
| 5 | Lady Shani defeated El Hijo del Tirantes | Lucha de Apuestas Hair vs. Hair match | 16:24 |
| 6 | Taya and Los Lucha Bros (Fénix and Pentagón Jr.) defeated Chik Tormenta, Taurus, and Hijo del Vikingo | Trios tag team match | 15:06 |
(c) / – the champion(s) heading into the match

== See also ==
- 2022 in professional wrestling
