= Niebla Roja =

Mexican professional wrestler (born 1986)

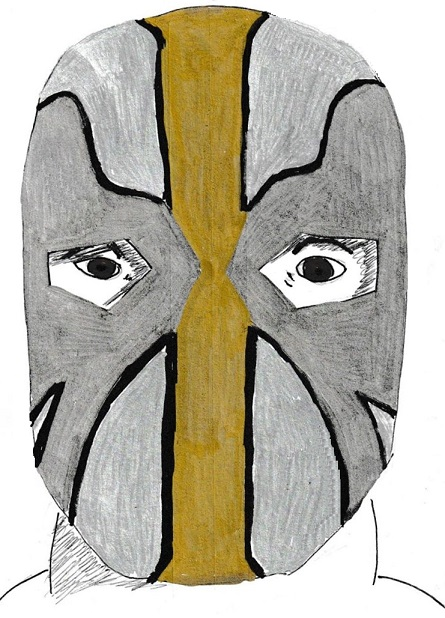
- The mask that Niebla Roja wore when wrestling as Ángel de Plata

Personal information
- Born: Sergio Raymundo Chávez Velasco; March 20, 1986 (age 40) Torreón, Coahuila, Mexico
- Children: 1
- Family: Apolo Chávez (father); Ángel de Oro (brother)

Professional wrestling career
- Ring name(s): Ángel de Plata; Guerrero Inca; Niebla Roja
- Billed height: 1.76 m (5 ft 9 1/2 in)
- Billed weight: 84 kg (185 lb)
- Billed from: Torreón, Coahuila, Mexico
- Trained by: Gran Cochisse; El Satánico; Corsario Rojo; Cóndor de Oro; Diabólico I Último Guerrero
- Debut: 2006

Sergio Raymundo Chávez Velasco (born March 20, 1986), better known by his ring name Niebla Roja (Spanish for "Red Mist"), is a Mexican professional wrestler. He is signed to Consejo Mundial de Lucha Libre (CMLL), where he is one-half of the current CMLL World Tag Team Champions in his first reign.

A second-generation wrestler, Chávez is the son of retired wrestler Apolo Chávez, and the brother of Miguel Ángel Chávez Velasco, who is also a professional wrestler under the ring name Ángel de Oro. He joined CMLL in 2008 under the name Ángel de Plata ("Silver Angel"), which he used until adopting his current ring name in 2012. He is a former CMLL World Light Heavyweight Champion, CMLL World Trios Champion with Euforia and Último Guerrero as part of Los Guerreros Laguneros, a group he worked with until 2017, and Strong Openweight Tag Team Champion. Chávez wrestled in the main event of the CMLL 84th Anniversary Show, losing the match and his mask to Gran Guerrero. He is also the winner of the 2017 La Copa Junior VIP and 2019 Copa Dinastías with Ángel de Oro. He has also wrestled for New Japan Pro-Wrestling (NJPW).

== Professional wrestling career ==
=== Early career (2006–2008) ===
Sergio Chávez made his professional wrestling debut in 2006 after training under Corsario Rojo, Cóndor de Oro and Diabólico I. He initially wrestled in the local Gómez Palacio, Durango area under the ring name Guerrero Inca ("Incan Warrior"), frequently working opposite his younger brother Ángel de Oro as the two developed a feud without revealing they were related. Sergio suffered an injury in early 2008 and was sidelined until December.

=== Consejo Mundial de Lucha Libre (2008–present) ===
==== Ángel de Plata (2008–2012) ====
Sergio made his first appearance for Consejo Mundial de Lucha Libre (CMLL) alongside his brother at Homenaje a Dos Leyendas ("Homage to Two Legends") on March 21, 2008, where they accompanied Héctor Garza to the ring for his Lucha de Apuestas ("bet match"). He received further training from Gran Cochisse in Guadalajara and El Satánico in Mexico City until making his official debut on December 29 under the new ring character Ángel de Plata, complementing his brother's character. They teamed under the name Los Ángeles Celestiales ("The Celestial Angels"), often alongside Ángel Azteca Jr., who used a similar ring character. On April 7, 2009, Ángel de Plata participated in a ten-man torneo cibernetico for the vacant CMLL World Lightweight Championship, which was won by Máscara Dorada. On September 25, he was paired with Garza in the Torneo Gran Alternativa ("Great Alternative Tournament"), where an experienced wrestler teams up with a newcomer; they defeated Averno and Pólvora in the first round before losing to La Ola Amarilla (Naito and Okumura) in the semi-finals.

Los Ángeles Celestiales lost to Los Cancerberos del Infierno (Euforia, Pólvora and Virus) in the first round of a tournament to crown new Mexican National Trios Champions on December 22. On July 18, 2010, Ángel de Plata was one of twelve men who put their mask on the line in the main event of Infierno en el Ring ("Inferno in the Ring"), a steel cage Lucha de Apuestas. He was able to escape the cage, watching as his brother won the match and unmasked Fabián el Gitano. He entered the Reyes del Aire ("Kings of the Air") tournament on January 1, 2011, eliminating Puma King before being eliminated at the same time as Arkangel de la Muerte. In the first round of that year's Torneo Gran Alternativa on March 25, he and Blue Panther lost to El Hijo del Signo and Mr. Niebla. The following month, he competed in the Forjando un Ídolo ("Forging an Idol") tournament as part of Group Delta, but failed to advance past the first round with zero points after losses to Magnus, Fuego and Pólvora. In October, Ángel de Plata was sidelined due to a rupture of his abdominal muscles that extended down into his leg, sustained after a dive onto Raziel during a match.

==== Niebla Roja and Los Guerreros Laguneros (2012–2017) ====
On March 30, 2012, he returned from injury in the Torneo Gran Alternativa under a new rudo character, Niebla Roja ("Red Mist"), complete with a new mask and attire. Paired with Último Guerrero, they defeated La Máscara and Pegasso in the first round but lost to Dragon Lee and Rush in the quarter-finals. On July 6, Roja was named the newest member of Guerrero's stable, Los Guerreros del Infierno. At the CMLL 79th Anniversary Show on September 14, he, Ephesto and Mephisto defeated Delta, Stuka Jr. and Valiente. He was forced to team with then-rival Dragón Rojo Jr. in the Torneo Nacional de Parejas Increíbles ("National Incredible Pairs Tournament") on March 8, 2013, defeating the teams of El Terrible and Rush and Blue Panther and Rey Escorpión before losing in the semi-finals to Atlantis and Guerrero. At the CMLL 80th Anniversary Show on September 13, he, Euforia and Mephisto defeated Brazo de Plata, Máximo and Titán. The first round of the 2014 Torneo Nacional de Parejas Increíbles on March 14 saw Roja and Stuka Jr. lose to Atlantis and Euforia.

After winning a non-title match at Homenaje a Dos Leyendas on March 21, Roja, Euforia and Guerrero defeated Los Estetas del Aire (Dorada, Místico and Valiente) seven days later to win the CMLL World Trios Championship, marking Roja's first professional wrestling championship. This allowed Roja to participate in the Universal Championship tournament on August 22, where he lost to Diamante Azul in the first round. In early 2015, Roja feuded with now-técnico Dragón Rojo Jr. over the CMLL World Middleweight Championship, which he failed to win on February 3. Ten days later, he, Euforia and Guerrero lost their championship to Sky Team (Místico, Valiente and Volador Jr.). On February 27, he and Dragón Rojo Jr. lost to El Terrible and Máximo in the first round of that year's Torneo Nacional de Parejas Increíbles.

At Homenaje a Dos Leyendas on March 17, 2017, Los Guerreros Laguneros lost to Dragon Lee, Stuka Jr. and Titán. During this time, Roja entered a major storyline where he accidentally caused stablemates Euforia and Gran Guerrero to lose matches due to miscommunication. He entered the Reyes del Aire ("Kings of the Air") tournament on April 7, eliminating Místico before being the third to last wrestler eliminated by Volador Jr. As the storyline progressed, Roja refused to participate in double or triple teaming an opponent, a common rudo practice by Los Guerreros. On May 19, Roja officially turned técnico by kicking Los Guerreros leader Último Guerrero in the face during a match, resulting in both Guerreros attacking him, tearing off his Guerrero-inspired mask and demanding Roja to come up with a new one.

==== Los Hermanos Chávez (2017–present) ====
Roja and Drone lost to Akuma and Pierroth in the first round of that year's Torneo Gran Alternativa on June 9. The next day, Roja won the vacant CMLL World Light Heavyweight Championship in a ten-man torneo cibernetico, last eliminating Bárbaro Cavernario. He entered that year's Universal Championship tournament on July 7, defeating Soberano Jr. in the first round and Místico in the quarter-finals, before losing to Último Guerrero in the semi-finals. Ten days later, he unsuccessfully challenged Guerrero for the NWA World Historic Middleweight Championship. The storyline with Los Guerreros culminated in a Lucha de Apuestas in the main event of the CMLL 84th Anniversary Show on September 16, where Roja lost to Gran Guerrero, thus being forced to unmask and state his legal name: Sergio Raymundo Chávez Velasco. On October 24, he successfully defended his title against Cavernario. On December 1, Roja defeated eleven other wrestlers to win the La Copa Junior VIP ("The Junior VIP Cup") tournament.

During the Torneo Nacional de Parejas Increíbles on February 2, 2018, Roja and Guerrero defeated Blue Panther and Sam Adonis in the first round, but lost to Místico and Mephisto in the quarter-finals. At Homenaje a Dos Leyendas on March 16, he, Atlantis and Matt Taven defeated Los Guerreros. Alongside Soberano Jr., Roja and Ángel de Oro failed to win the Mexican National Trios Championship from Nueva Generación Dinamita (El Cuatrero, Forastero and Sansón) on April 22. On May 11, he and Astral lost in the first round of the Torneo Gran Alternativa to Akuma and Euforia. On July 17, Roja retained the CMLL World Light Heavyweight Championship against Sansón. At the CMLL 85th Anniversary Show on September 14, he, Ángel de Oro and Audaz defeated La Peste Negra (El Felino and Negro Casas) and Mephisto. On November 18, Roja defeated Rey Bucanero, following a brief feud between the two, in a Lucha de Apuestas to shave him bald. The brothers and Soberano Jr. again failed to win the Mexican National Trios Championship on January 4, 2019. Later that month, Roja retained his title against Luciferno.

Roja entered the Universal Championship tournament on February 8, defeating Mephisto, Volador Jr. and Último Guerrero en route to the following week's finals, which he lost to El Terrible after interference from La Bestia del Ring. This led to Los Hermanos Chávez winning a Lucha de Apuestas at Homenaje a Dos Leyendas on March 15 against Los Ingobernables (El Terrible and La Bestia del Ring), both of whom were then shaved bald. On April 9, he, Ángel de Oro and Soberano Jr. failed to win Nueva Generación Dinamita's Mexican National Trios Championship in their third attempt. Ten days later, Roja and El Terrible lost to Guerrero and Volador Jr. in the first round of the Torneo Nacional de Parejas Increíbles, in part due to miscommunication between the two. On September 27, he, Ángel de Oro and Mephisto defeated Euforia, Gran Guerrero and Soberano Jr. at the CMLL 86th Anniversary Show. Roja's partner for the Torneo Gran Alternativa on October 11 was Magia Blanca, losing to Guerrero and Furia Roja in the first round. Roja successfully defended the CMLL World Light Heavyweight Championship against Guerrero three days later and Mephisto on November 18. He and El Felino participated in the Torneo Nacional de Parejas Increíbles on February 14, 2020, defeating Dulce Gardenia and Okumura in the first round before losing to Carístico and Forastero in the quarter-finals.

On March 26, 2021, after months of teasing a rudo turn due to crowd rejection and an alliance with El Terrible (teaming as Terriblemente Chavez), Roja and Ángel de Oro solidified their turn and they formed Los Nuevos Ingobernables. On January 23, 2022, Los Hermanos Chávez defeated Titán and Volador Jr. to win the CMLL World Tag Team Championship. He entered the Universal Championship tournament on April 22, defeating El Sagrado and Hechicero before a semi-finals loss to Titán. On July 15, Roja lost the CMLL World Light Heavyweight Championship to Cavernario. On September 2, he was the last wrestler eliminated by Místico in the semi-final torneo cibernetico of the Copa Independencia ("Independence Cup") tournament.

At the CMLL 91st Anniversary Show on September 13, 2024, Los Hermanos Chávez and Soberano Jr. defeated Neón, Star Jr. and Templario. They retained their championship against Rocky Romero and Volador Jr. at Homenaje a Dos Leyendas on March 21, 2025, and El Hijo del Villano III and Villano III Jr. at the CMLL 92nd Anniversary Show on September 19. On November 14, they defeated United Empire (Templario and TJP) for the Strong Openweight Tag Team Championship. On January 27, 2026, Roja failed to win Atlantis Jr.'s NWA World Historic Light Heavyweight Championship. At the CMLL 93rd Anniversary Show on September 18, they retained the CMLL World Tag Team Championship in a fatal four-way match against El Hijo del Villano III and Villano III Jr., El Sky Team (Máscara Dorada and Neón) and Los Hermanos Calavera (Calavera Jr. I and Calavera Jr. II). At Lucha Kingdom on November 16, they lost the Strong Openweight Tag Team Championship to Unbound Co. (Taiji Ishimori and Titán) in a three-way match also involving Francesco Akira and Templario.

=== New Japan Pro-Wrestling (2014–2020) ===
Roja made his debut in Japan in January 2014, participating in the New Japan Pro-Wrestling (NJPW) and CMLL co-produced Fantastica Mania 2014 tour. He returned in January 2018 for the Fantastica Mania 2018 tour, successfully defending the CMLL World Light Heavyweight Championship against Gran Guerrero. He and Ángel de Oro also participated in the "CMLL Brothers Tag Team Tournament", losing to Gran and Último Guerrero in the first round. Roja returned for the Fantastica Mania 2020 tour in January 2020, where he and his brother participated in the "CMLL Family Tag Tournament" and lost to El Cuatrero and Sansón in the finals. At the end of the tour, they teamed with Titán and unsuccessfully challenged Nueva Generación Dinamita for the Mexican National Trios Championship.

== Personal life ==
Sergio Chávez was born in Torreón on March 20, 1986, the son of professional wrestler Apolo Chávez and brother of Miguel Ángel Chávez Velasco, better known under the ring name Ángel de Oro. Sergio is the father to a son. During the COVID-19 pandemic, when he was unable to wrestle, he moved to the United States and worked various odd jobs.

== Championships and accomplishments ==
- Consejo Mundial de Lucha Libre
  - CMLL World Light Heavyweight Championship (1 time)
  - CMLL World Tag Team Championship (1 time, current) – with Ángel de Oro
  - CMLL World Trios Championship (1 time) – with Euforia and Último Guerrero
  - Copa Dinastías (2019) – with Ángel de Oro
  - La Copa Junior (2017 VIP)
- Lucha Libre Voz
  - Voz Ultra Championship (1 time, inaugural)
- New Japan Pro Wrestling
  - Strong Openweight Tag Team Championship (1 time) – with Ángel de Oro
- Pro Wrestling Illustrated
  - Ranked No. 116 of the top 500 singles wrestlers in the PWI 500 in 2022

== Lucha de Apuestas record ==
Winner (wager)	Loser (wager)	Location	Event	Date	Notes
Gran Guerrero (mask)	Niebla Roja (mask)	Mexico City	CMLL 84th Anniversary Show	September 16, 2017	
Niebla Roja (hair)	Furia Roja (hair)	Guadalajara, Jalisco	CMLL Guadalajara Martes	June 12, 2018	
Niebla Roja (hair)	Rey Bucanero (hair)	Mexico City	Domingo Arena Mexico	November 18, 2018	
Los Hermanos Chavez (hair) (Ángel de Oro and Niebla Roja)	Los Ingobernables (hair) (El Terrible and La Bestia del Ring)	Mexico City	Homenaje a Dos Leyendas	March 15, 2019	
