= CMLL Universal Championship (2019) =

2019 Consejo Mundial de Lucha Libre event

- Poster for the February 15 tournament final
- Promotion: Consejo Mundial de Lucha Libre
- Date: February 2, 2019; February 9, 2019; February 16, 2019
- City: Mexico City, Mexico
- Venue: Arena México

Event chronology
← Previous; Fantastica Mania	Next → Homenaje a Dos Leyendas

CMLL Universal Championship tournaments chronology
← Previous; 2017	Next → —

The CMLL Universal Championship (2019) (Spanish: Campeonato Universal) was a professional wrestling tournament produced and scripted by Consejo Mundial de Lucha Libre (CMLL; "World Wrestling Council"). The tournament started on February 2, 2019 and ran for three Super Viernes shows with the final held on February 14, 2019 at Arena México in Mexico City, Mexico.

The CMLL Universal Championship is an annual tournament exclusively for wrestlers who hold a CMLL-recognized championship at the time of the tournament. The tournament was first held in 2009, but not held in 2018 for unexplained reasons, making the 2019 version the tenth overall tournament. Being a professional wrestling tournament, it is not won legitimately; it is instead won via predetermined outcomes to the matches that is kept secret from the general public. In the finals of the 2019 tournament Mexican National Heavyweight Champion El Terrible defeated the CMLL World Light Heavyweight Champion Niebla Roja to become a two-time tournament winner.

== Background ==
The tournament featured 15 professional wrestling matches under single-elimination tournament rules, which means that wrestlers would be eliminated from the tournament when they lose a match. All male "non-regional" CMLL champions at the time of the tournament were eligible to participate in the tournament. The CMLL World Mini-Estrella Championship is exclusively for CMLL's Mini-Estrella division and thus not eligible for the tournament. Regionally promoted championships such as the CMLL Arena Coliseo Tag Team Championship and the Occidente championships promoted in Guadalajara, Jalisco have not been included in the tournament in the past; only titles that have been defended in CMLL's main venue Arena Mexico, although exceptions have been made to allow New Japan Pro-Wrestling (NJPW) champions to compete if they were in Mexico at the time. Both Euforia and Eléctrico were eligible for the tournament, but neither champion participated.

=== Eligible champions ===
Champion	Championship held	Block	Ref(s)
Bárbaro Cavernario	Mexican National Light Heavyweight Championship	A	
Carístico	NWA World Historic Middleweight Championship	A	
El Cuatrero	CMLL World Middleweight Championship; Mexican National Trios Championship; Occidente Trios Championship	B	
Diamante Azul	CMLL World Tag Team Championship	B	
Dragon Lee	CMLL World Lightweight Championship	A	
Eléctrico	Mexican National Lightweight Championship	N/A	
Euforia	CMLL World Trios Championship	N/A	
Forastero	Mexican National Trios Championship; Occidente Trios Championship	A	
Gran Guerrero	CMLL World Trios Championship	A	
Mephisto	CMLL World Welterweight Championship	B	
Niebla Roja	CMLL World Light Heavyweight Championship	B	
Sansón	Mexican National Trios Championship; Occidente Trios Championship	B	
Soberano Jr.	Mexican National Welterweight Championship	B	
Stuka Jr.	NWA World Historic Light Heavyweight Championship	A	
El Terrible	Mexican National Heavyweight Championship	A	
Último Guerrero	CMLL World Heavyweight Championship; CMLL World Trios Championship	B	
Valiente	CMLL World Tag Team Championship	A	
Volador Jr.	NWA World Historic Welterweight Championship	B	

== Tournament ==
First round
El Terrible	W
Stuka Jr.	02:31
Valiente	05:16
Gran Guerrero	W
Dragón Lee	W
Forastero	04:45
Carístico	W
Cavernario	03:23
Último Guerrero	W
Diamante Azul	03:14
El Cuatrero	W
Soberano Jr.	04:42
Niebla Roja	W
Mephisto	03:40
Volador Jr.	W
Sansón	03:21

Second round
El Terrible	W
Gran Guerrero	03:38
Dragón Lee	W
Carístico	05:00
Último Guerrero	W
El Cuatero	04:02
Niebla Roja	W
Volador Jr.	05:04

Semifinals
El Terrible	W
Dragón Lee	10:06
Último Guerrero	06:00
Niebla Roja	W

Finals
El Terrible	W
Niebla Roja
