= DMT Azul =

Mexican professional wrestler (born 1982)

Personal information
- Born: December 20, 1982 (age 43) Mexico City, Mexico

Professional wrestling career
- Ring name(s): Diamante Azul; DMT Azul; El Romano; Metro (III)
- Billed height: 1.83 m (6 ft 0 in)
- Billed weight: 97 kg (214 lb)
- Trained by: Tony Salazar; Franco Columbo
- Debut: 2007

DMT Azul (born December 20, 1982) is a Mexican professional wrestler. He wrestles on the Mexican independent circuit, including for International Wrestling Revolution Group (IWRG), where he is the current IWRG Intercontinental Heavyweight Champion in his second reign. He is best known for his time with Consejo Mundial de Lucha Libre (CMLL) and Lucha Libre AAA Worldwide (AAA).

He originally wrestled under the ring name El Romano until 2009, when he was given a new ring name and mask, Metro; the name had been used by at least three other CMLL wrestlers before 2009. The "Metro" ring character was sponsored by the Mexico City Metro newspaper, incorporating the newspaper's logo and color scheme (red and gold) in the mask and wrestling trunks. In early 2012, he was given a new image and ring name, dropping the sponsored ring name to become Diamante Azul ("Blue Diamond") instead. He is a former NWA World Historic Light Heavyweight Champion, CMLL World Tag Team Champion with Atlantis and the winner of the 2012 Leyenda de Azul tournament. In AAA, he was a part of the La Empresa ("The Enterprise") stable alongside Puma King and Sam Adonis, with whom he won the AAA World Trios Championship. He has also wrestled in Japan for New Japan Pro-Wrestling (NJPW).

== Professional wrestling career ==
=== Early career (2007–2009) ===
After training under Tony Salazar and Franco Columbo at Consejo Mundial de Lucha Libre (CMLL)'s wrestling school in Mexico City, he debuted in 2007 under the ring name "El Romano" (Spanish for "The Roman"), wearing a mask fashioned after a Galea or Roman Soldier helmet. Initially planned to team with long-time CMLL wrestlers Calígula and Méssala, both of whom used similar ring characters, he only worked intermittently as El Romano in 2007 and 2008, disappearing for long stretches of time to receive further training from Salazar and Columbo.

=== Consejo Mundial de Lucha Libre (2007–2009) ===
==== Metro (2009–2012) ====
In January 2009, he was repackaged under a new mask as the técnico ("good guy") character "Metro", sponsored by the major Mexico City newspaper of the same name, incorporating its logo and red and gold color scheme in both the mask and the trunks worn. On January 6, 2010, Metro won his first professional wrestling championship, as he, Máscara Dorada and Stuka Jr. defeated Poder Mexica (Dragón Rojo Jr., Misterioso Jr. and Sangre Azteca) in a tournament final for the vacant Mexican National Trios Championship. At Sin Salida ("No Escape") on June 6, he, Rush and Stuka Jr. defeated Histeria, Maniaco and Monsther. For holding a championship, Metro was slotted into that year's Universal Championship tournament on August 6, but lost to Héctor Garza in the first round. On November 18, Dorada relinquished his part of the Mexican National Trios Championship, leading to Metro and Stuka Jr.'s new partner being determined in an online poll that was won by Delta. They lost the championship to Ángel de Oro, Diamante and Rush on January 9, 2011.

The following month, Metro was paired with rúdo ("bad guy") Rey Bucanero in the Torneo Nacional de Parejas Increíbles ("National Incredible Pairs Tournament"), which forced rivals to team up. They defeated Azteca and El Alebrije in the first round and Mr. Águila and Rush in the quarter-finals, before losing to Blue Panther and Dragón Rojo Jr. in the semi-finals. At Homenaje a Dos Leyendas ("Homage to Two Legends") on March 18, he, Diamante and Stuka Jr. defeated Euforia, Okumura and Raziel. On July 29, he competed in the Leyenda de Azul ("The Blue Legend") tournament, but was the first wrestler eliminated from the torneo cibernetico by Psicosis. At the CMLL 78th Anniversary Show on September 30, Metro participated in the semi-final of the Leyenda de Plata ("The Silver Legend") tournament, where he eliminated Virus before being eliminated by Mephisto. Following his elimination, he attacked fellow participant and former tag team partner Dorada, allowing eventual winner Jushin Thunder Liger to eliminate him.

==== Diamante Azul (2012–2021) ====
On February 16, 2012, Metro was repackaged as "Diamante Azul" ("Blue Diamond"), complete with a blue mask, trunks and cape that closely resembled both Blue Demon and Blue Demon Jr.'s ring gear. He made his televised debut under the name on March 2, teaming with La Máscara and Marco Corleone to defeat Bucanero, Último Guerrero and Volador Jr. by disqualification at Homenaje a Dos Leyendas. According to Azul, the design of his mask and ring gear was his own original idea. After unsuccessfully challenging Los Guerreros (Guerrero and Dragón Rojo Jr.) for the CMLL World Tag Team Championship on May 1 alongside Blue Panther, Azul captured the title with Atlantis on August 3. He entered the Universal Championship tournament on August 24, defeating Pólvora in the first round before losing to Hiroshi Tanahashi in the quarter-finals. On September 10, he unsuccessfully challenged El Terrible for the CMLL World Heavyweight Championship. Six days later, they successfully defended the title against La Peste Negra (El Felino and Mr. Niebla). On October 12, Azul outlasted fifteen wrestlers to win that year's Leyenda de Azul ("The Blue Legend") tournament. On November 13, he and Atlantis lost the CMLL World Tag Team Championship to El Terrible and Tama Tonga. He aligned with Euforia for that year's Torneo Nacional de Parejas Increíbles on March 8, 2013, defeating Ángel de Oro and Ephesto in the first round, but lost to Atlantis and Guerrero in the quarter-finals.

Azul defeated Bucanero on June 4 to win the NWA World Historic Light Heavyweight Championship, retaining it against Guerrero on July 22 and Vangelis on August 6. On February 7, 2014, he and Black Panther lost to Bárbaro Cavernario and Mr. Niebla in the first round of the Torneo Gran Alternativa ("Great Alternative Tournament"), in which a rookie teams with a more experienced wrestler. He was forced to team with Bucanero in the Torneo Nacional de Parejas Increíbles on March 14, defeating Brazo de Plata and Kraneo in the first round and Blue Panther and Negro Casas in the quarter-finals, before losing in the semi-finals to Atlantis and Euforia. On May 12 and 27, he respectively defeated Ripper and El Terrible to retain the title. In that year's Universal Championship tournament on August 22, Azul defeated Niebla Roja in the first round, but lost to Volador Jr. in the quarter-finals. He also retained the title on September 14 against Euforia. However, on February 22, 2015, Azul was stripped of the title after three months of inactivity due to moving to France. He returned in June, but soon went into a four-month hiatus before returning in November. Another extended hiatus followed until Azul made his full-time return at a Lucha Libre Elite (LLE) event on May 21, 2016, failing to win the Elite Heavyweight Championship in a battle royal. On June 5, he and Atlantis unsuccessfully challenged for Casas and Shocker's CMLL World Tag Team Championship. On November 1, he, Máscara Dorada and Místico failed to win the Mexican National Trios Championship from Los Hijos del Infierno (Ephesto, Luciferno and Mephisto). During the Leyenda de Azul on November 18, he and Euforia were simultaneously disqualified and eliminated for unmasking each other.

At the same time, Azul feuded with Los Ingobernables (La Máscara, Pierroth and Rush), specifically with Pierroth. Paired for the Torneo Nacional de Parejas Increíbles on February 10, 2017, they defeated Corleone and Kraneo in the first round before losing to Carístico and Mephisto in the quarter-finals. The feud led to a mask vs. mask Lucha de Apuestas ("bet match") in the main event of Homenaje a Dos Leyendas on March 17, where Azul defeated Pierroth, forcing him to unmask. He entered the Universal Championship tournament on July 7 as a replacement for the injured Atlantis, defeating Ephesto in the first round but losing to Guerrero in the quarter-finals. On August 21, he unsuccessfully challenged Corleone for the CMLL World Heavyweight Championship. On September 1, Azul last eliminated Michael Elgin to win the International Grand Prix. At the CMLL 84th Anniversary Show on September 16, he, Corleone and Valiente defeated Nueva Generación Dinamita (El Cuatrero, Forastero and Sansón). On October 22, Azul and El Terrible outlasted ten other wrestlers to face each other for the vacant Mexican National Heavyweight Championship the following week, which the latter won. On January 15 and 26, 2018, Azul failed to win both Corleone and El Terrible's respective championships.

Azul and Pierroth placed their differences aside for that year's Torneo Nacional de Parejas Increíbles on February 2, defeating Bucanero and Valiente in the first round before losing to Guerrero and Volador Jr. in the quarter-finals. On May 27, he again failed to win El Terrible's title. At the CMLL 85th Anniversary Show on September 14, Azul and The Lucha Brothers (King Phoenix and Penta El Zero M) defeated Carístico, El Hijo de L.A. Park and L. A. Park. On October 16, Azul and Guerrero faced each other for the vacant CMLL World Heavyweight Championship after co-winning a torneo cibernetico the previous week, which Guerrero won. On November 18, Azul and Valiente defeated El Terrible and Rush for the CMLL World Tag Team Championship. He lost to Guerrero in the first round of the Universal Championship tournament on February 8, 2019. At Homenaje a Dos Leyendas on March 15, he, Soberano Jr. and Titán defeated Ephesto, Mephisto and Templario. At Juicio Final ("Final Justice") on May 31, they lost the title to Euforia and Gran Guerrero. At the CMLL 86th Anniversary Show on September 27, he, Dulce Gardenia and Titán defeated Bucanero, El Hijo del Villano III and Hechicero by disqualification. Azul teamed with rookie Retro in the Torneo Gran Alternativa on October 4, losing in the first round to Difunto and Último Guerrero.

For the 2020 Torneo Nacional de Parejas Increíbles on February 14, Azul and Gilbert el Boricua defeated Guerrero Maya Jr. and Universo 2000 Jr. in the first round, before losing in the quarter-finals to Bandido and Guerrero. On September 25, Azul defeated El Terrible to capture the Mexican National Heavyweight Championship for the first time. Azul was a finalist in that year's Leyenda de Azul on November 27, but was eliminated by Ángel de Oro after a low blow from El Terrible. On April 10, 2021, he unsuccessfully challenged Guerrero for the CMLL World Heavyweight Championship. In May, Azul announced his departure from CMLL as he felt his career was going nowhere, ending his twelve-year tenure with the promotion.

=== New Japan Pro-Wrestling (2012) ===
On November 11, 2012, New Japan Pro-Wrestling (NJPW) announced Diamante Azul and Rush as participants in the 2012 World Tag League, joining Group B under the name CMLL Asesino ("CMLL Assassins"). They finished in last place with a record of two wins and four losses, failing to advance to the semi-finals.

=== Lucha Libre AAA Worldwide (2021–2025) ===
Diamante Azul made his debut for Lucha Libre AAA Worldwide (AAA) at Rey de Reyes ("King of Kings") on May 1, 2021, attacking Chessman, Pagano and Psycho Clown. He allied himself with Puma King and Sam Adonis, forming the stable La Empresa ("The Enterprise"). At Triplemanía XXIX on August 14, La Empresa defeated the trio, who were billed as Team AAA. At Héroes Inmortales XIV ("Immortal Heroes XIV") on October 9, they defeated Dave the Clown and Psycho Circus (Murder Clown and Psycho Clown) in a steel cage match after interference from Estrellita, having attacked Monster Clown before the match to prevent him from competing. At Triplemanía Regia II on December 4, they defeated Chessman, Dave the Clown and Murder Clown. On March 5, 2022, La Empresa defeated Los Mercenarios (Rey Escorpión, Taurus and Villano III Jr.) to capture the AAA World Trios Championship, but lost it to Nueva Generación Dinamita in a dark match at Verano de Escándalo ("Summer of Scandal") on August 5. Following the event, Azul left AAA and continued to work as an independent wrestler.

Azul returned to AAA at Triplemanía XXXI: Monterrey on April 16, 2023, teaming with Blue Demon Jr. in the Guerra de Rivalidades ("War of Rivalries") tournament, where the losers would advance to a Lucha de Apuestas in the finals. Both men kept their masks safe by defeating L. A. Park and Rush in the first round. On March 22, 2025, at Rey de Reyes, Azul defeated Aero Star, Cibernético and Taurus to qualify for the four-way finals of the titular tournament, which was won by Niño Hamburguesa; it also involved El Hijo de Dr. Wagner Jr. and El Mesías.

=== Independent circuit (2021–present) ===
On May 2, 2021, Diamante Azul made his surprise debut for International Wrestling Revolution Group (IWRG), where he and El Hijo de Canis Lupus won a battle royal to face each other for the Rey del Ring ("King of the Ring") championship the following week. His ring name was also slightly tweaked to DMT Azul. During the match, Azul was disqualified for performing a piledriver (a banned move in Mexico) on Lupus, who won the title as a result. At a The Crash Lucha Libre event on March 24, 2023, he defeated El Mesías, Pierroth Jr. and Texano Jr. in a fatal four-way match to become the number one contender for The Crash Heavyweight Championship, at the time held by L. A. Park. On May 5, Azul defeated Blue Demon Jr., EC3 and Matt Taven to win the now-vacant title.

At El Castillo del Terror ("The Castle of Terror") on November 2, 2023, Azul defeated Galeno del Mal, Hijo del Pirata Morgan, Ivan Rokov and Vito Fratelli to win the IWRG Intercontinental Heavyweight Championship. Prior to the match, he received a special ring introduction from Drake Bell. On November 8, 2024, at The Crash XIII Aniversario, Azul and Raj Dhesi unsuccessfully challenged El Hijo de Dr. Wagner Jr. and Galeno del Mal for The Crash Tag Team Championship. He lost the title to Dr. Wagner Jr. in a steel cage ladder match at Guerreros de Acero ("Warriors of Steel") on January 1, 2025. On October 3, Azul lost The Crash Heavyweight Championship to Andrade El Idolo. After defeating Pig Destroyer and Pirata Morgan to become the number one contender, Azul won his second IWRG Intercontinental Heavyweight Championship on October 30 at El Castillo del Terror by defeating Dr. Wagner Jr. in a four-way casket match also involving Chessman and Morgan. He successfully defended the title against Chessman on February 1, 2026, at Caravana de Campeones ("Caravan of Champions").

== Metro: A shared identity ==
Several CMLL wrestlers have worked under the sponsored ring name "Metro", which was introduced for young wrestlers who had yet to establish their own ring character. The most recent Metro was generally referred to as "Metro (III)" in writing, but none of them are officially numbered nor promoted as separate wrestlers.

- Metro (I) – The first Metro who used the name in 2005 and 2006; later wrestled under the name Fabián el Gitano.
- Metro (Guadalajara) – Worked as Metro around the same time as Metro I, but only in CMLL's farm league in Guadalajara; now works under the ring name Azazel.
- Metro (II) – Worked as Metro in 2006 and 2007; currently wrestles as Neutrón.

== Personal life ==
The wrestler later known as Diamante Azul was born in Mexico City on December 20, 1982. His birth name is not a matter of public record, as is often the case with masked wrestlers in Mexico, where their private lives are kept a secret from wrestling fans.

In early 2015, it was reported that Azul had moved to France in November the previous year, causing him to take a hiatus from wrestling. When he made his full-time return in mid-2016, Azul said he was processing his French citizenship and had been teaching Olympic wrestling there. In a June 2017 interview with 24 Horas, Azul revealed that he was in a relationship with a French woman, had three children, and had aspirations of opening a French pastry shop in Mexico.

== Other media ==
Diamante Azul was a participant in Univision's 2026 reality television show Garra vs Veneno: Guerreros Mundiales ("Claw vs Venom: World Warriors").

== Championships and accomplishments ==
- Consejo Mundial de Lucha Libre
  - CMLL World Tag Team Championship (2 times) – with Atlantis (1) and Valiente (1)
  - Mexican National Trios Championship (1 time) – with Stuka Jr. and Máscara Dorada/Delta
  - Mexican National Heavyweight Championship (1 time)
  - NWA World Historic Light Heavyweight Championship (1 time)
  - Occidente Heavyweight Championship (1 time)
  - International Gran Prix (2017)
  - Leyenda de Azul (2012)
  - Torneo Parejas Increíbles Puebla (2019) – with Tiger
- International Wrestling Revolution Group
  - IWRG Intercontinental Heavyweight Championship (2 times, current)
- Lucha Libre AAA Worldwide
  - AAA World Trios Championship (1 time) – with Puma King and Sam Adonis
- Producciones TC
  - TC Heavyweight Championship (1 time, current)
- Pro Wrestling Illustrated
  - Ranked No. 126 of the top 500 singles wrestlers in the PWI 500 in 2014
- The Crash Lucha Libre
  - The Crash Heavyweight Championship (1 time)

== Luchas de Apuestas record ==
Winner (wager)	Loser (wager)	Location	Event	Date	Notes
Diamante Azul (mask)	Pierroth (mask)	Mexico City	Homenaje a Dos Leyendas	March 17, 2017	
