= El Soberano =

Mexican professional wrestler

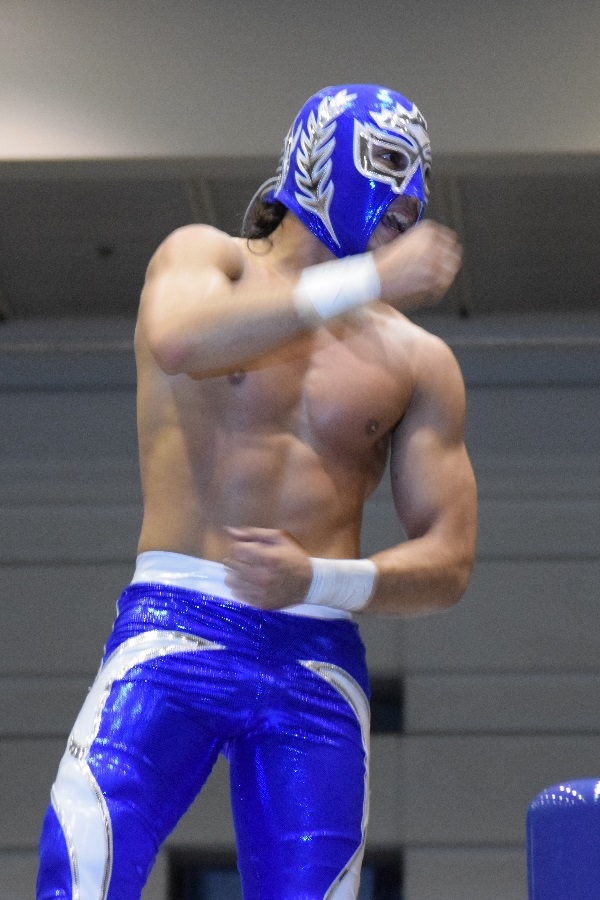
- Soberano Jr. in January 2017

Personal information
- Born: Unrevealed; August 12, 1993 (age 33) Torreón, Coahuila, Mexico
- Family: Euforia (father); Pablo Moreno Román (grandfather)

Professional wrestling career
- Ring name(s): Hijo del Soberano; Soberano Jr. El Soberano
- Billed height: 1.80 m (5 ft 11 in)
- Billed weight: 75 kg (165 lb)
- Trained by: Soberano; Euforia; El Satánico; Franco Columbo; Virus
- Debut: December 24, 2007

El Soberano (Spanish for "the Sovereign"; born August 12, 1993), or Soberano Jr., is a Mexican professional wrestler signed to both Consejo Mundial de Lucha Libre (CMLL) and New Japan Pro-Wrestling (NJPW). A third-generation wrestler, he is the son of Euforia and grandson of Pablo Moreno Román, also known under the ring name El Soberano.

Soberano Jr. is a former one-time CMLL World Middleweight Champion and one-time Mexican National Welterweight Champion. He is also the winner of several tournaments in CMLL, including the 2013 Torneo Sangre Nueva, the 2017 La Copa Junior Nuevo Valores and Torneo Gran Alternativa, the 2021 Leyenda de Azul, and the 2023 La Copa Junior VIP. Outside of Mexico, Soberano Jr. has wrestled in Japan for NJPW, in the United States for Ring of Honor (ROH), and in the United Kingdom for Revolution Pro Wrestling (RevPro).

== Personal life ==
Soberano Jr. was born in Torreón on August 12, 1993, the son of professional wrestler Euforia. As Soberano Jr. is a masked wrestler, his birth name is not a matter of public record, a tradition in lucha libre where their personal lives are kept a secret from the public. His grandfather, Pablo Moreno Román, also wrestled under the ring name "El Soberano". His uncle, Pablo Moreno Leon, wrestled as "Stranger" until his death in 2000.

== Professional wrestling career ==
=== Early career (2007–2010) ===
After training under his father and grandfather, Soberano Jr. made his professional wrestling debut at the age of 13 on December 24, 2007, initially wrestling on the local independent circuit in Torreón. Early in his career, he worked as "Hijo del Soberano" before adopting his grandfather's ring name. When he joined Consejo Mundial de Lucha Libre (CMLL) in 2010, he received additional training from El Satánico, Franco Columbo and Virus.

=== Consejo Mundial de Lucha Libre (2010–present) ===
==== Early years (2010–2017) ====
Prior to his in-ring debut, Soberano Jr. competed in CMLL's annual bodybuilding contest on November 25, 2010, ranking third in the beginners category. He made his debut at Arena México on June 7, 2011, teaming with Trueno against Apocalipsis and Semental. On March 6, 2012, Soberano Jr. participated in the Torneo Sangre Nueva ("The New Blood Tournament"), featuring sixteen wrestlers classified as rookies, but failed to win the eight-man semi-final torneo cibernetico. However, after outlasting nine other wrestlers on February 26, 2013, Soberano Jr. defeated Taurus on March 12 to win that year's Torneo Sangre Nueva. On April 19, Soberano Jr. was paired with La Sombra in the Torneo Gran Alternativa ("Great Alternative Tournament"), where a rookie teams with a more experienced wrestler. They defeated El Terrible and Herodes Jr. in the first round and Rush and Sensei in the quarter-finals, but lost to Bobby Zavala and Rey Escorpión in the semi-finals.

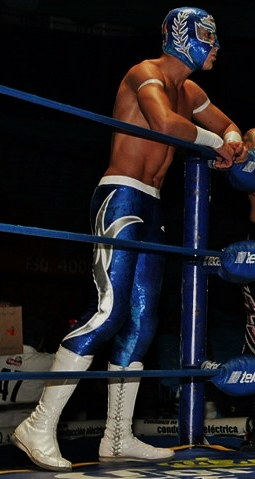
Soberano Jr. in February 2013

From January 31 to February 14, 2014, Soberano Jr. and Volador Jr. competed in the following year's Torneo Gran Alternativa, defeating Espanto Jr. and Mephisto in the first round, El Terrible and Guerrero Negro Jr. in the quarter-finals and La Sombra and Oro Jr. in the semi-finals, before losing in the finals to La Peste Negra (Bárbaro Cavernario and Mr. Niebla). In May, he finished in sixth place in the En Busca de un Ídolo ("In Search of an Idol") tournament. He then formed the tag team Los Principes del Ring ("The Princes of the Ring") with Star Jr., being involved in a feud with veteran wrestlers Cholo and Ramstein that led to a Lucha de Apuestas ("bet match") on January 6, 2015, where the losers were forced to unmask and reveal their real names. They defeated Cholo and Ramstein, both of whom abided to the stipulation. On March 18, 2016, Soberano Jr. and Oro Jr. lost to El Cuatrero and Sansón in the opening match of Homenaje a Dos Leyendas ("Homage to Two Legends").

==== Mexican National Welterweight Champion (2017–2021) ====
Soberano Jr. received a push in early 2017, outlasting Canelo Casas, Drone, El Cuatrero, El Hijo del Signo, Espanto Jr., Oro Jr. and The Panther on April 14 to qualify for the finals of the La Copa Junior Nuevo Valores ("The New Values Junior Cup") tournament, designated for second-generation wrestlers; he won by defeating Sansón two weeks later. On May 12, Soberano Jr. defeated Rey Cometa for the Mexican National Welterweight Championship, his first professional wrestling championship. The following month, Soberano Jr. paired with Carístico to win that year's Torneo Gran Alternativa, respectively defeating the teams of Ángel de Oro and Oro Jr., Flyer and Volador Jr., Canelo Casas and Negro Casas and Sansón and Último Guerrero.

Holding a title made Soberano Jr. eligible for the Universal Championship tournament, but he lost to Niebla Roja in the opening round on July 7. On October 2, he made his first successful title defense against Cavernario. Eleven days later, he competed in the semi-final torneo cibernetico of the Leyenda de Plata ("The Silver Legend") tournament, but was eliminated near the end by Sansón. At Día de Muertos ("Day of the Dead") on November 3, he was the last wrestler eliminated by Sansón in a torneo cibernetico for the Rey del Inframundo ("King of the Underworld") championship, having previously eliminated El Cuatrero. In early 2018, Soberano Jr. was paired with Hechicero for the Torneo Nacional de Parejas Increíbles ("National Incredible Pairs Tournament"), where a técnico (face) teams with a rúdo (heel). Despite no significant rivalry between the two, they were named the "dark horse" team of the tournament, but lost to Mephisto and Místico in the first round on February 2. On February 26, he unsuccessfully challenged Mephisto for the CMLL World Welterweight Championship. Four days later, he and Atlantis lost to Gran Guerrero and Último Guerrero in the first round of a tournament for the CMLL World Tag Team Championship.

Soberano Jr. aligned with Ángel de Oro and Roja in their feud against Nueva Generación Dinamita (El Cuatrero, Forastero and Sansón), but unsuccessfully challenged them for the Mexican National Trios Championship on April 22. Meanwhile, Soberano Jr. made further successful defenses of his title against Magia Blanca on May 1 and Titán on June 25. At the CMLL 86th Anniversary Show on September 14, he, Atlantis and Místico lost to Nueva Generación Dinamita. Entering 2019, the Soberano Jr., Ángel de Oro and Roja trio again failed to win their Mexican National Trios Championship on January 4. On February 8, he lost to El Cuatrero in the first round of that year's Universal Championship tournament. At Homenaje a Dos Leyendas on March 15, he, Diamante Azul and Titán defeated Ephesto, Mephisto and Templario. On April 9, he, Ángel de Oro and Roja failed to win the trios championship from Nueva Generación Dinamita in their third attempt. Three days later, Soberano Jr. and long-time rival Sansón were forced to team in the Torneo Nacional de Parejas Increíbles, defeating Rey Bucanero and Tritón in the first round before losing in the quarter-finals to Cavernario and Titán.

Soberano Jr. and his father Euforia (right) celebrating after winning the Copa Dinastías in June 2022

On June 2 and July 22, Soberano Jr. successfully defended the Mexican National Welterweight Championship against Negro Casas. At the CMLL 86th Anniversary Show on September 27, he, Euforia and Gran Guerrero lost to Ángel de Oro, Mephisto and Roja. On October 6, he retained the title against Templario when their match ended in a draw, followed by a third successful defense over Casas on November 29. Two days later, he and Titán outlasted ten other wrestlers to face each other for the vacant CMLL World Welterweight Championship on December 8, which Titán won. On February 21, 2020, he and Templario lost to Cavernario and Volador Jr. in the first round of the Torneo Nacional de Parejas Increíbles. Seven days later, he and Titán entered a tournament for the reintroduced Mexican National Tag Team Championship, respectively defeating El Sagrado and Misterioso Jr. and Ephesto and Luciferno before losing to El Hijo del Villano III and Templario in the semi-finals. On September 25, he failed to win Titán's title at the CMLL 87th Anniversary Show. At some point in early 2021, Soberano Jr. suffered an undisclosed injury that kept him out of action for seven months, making his return on November 26 to win the Leyenda de Azul ("The Blue Legend") tournament. On December 1, his 1,664-day Mexican National Welterweight Championship reign ended when he vacated the title to participate in a tournament for the now-vacant CMLL World Middleweight Championship.

==== CMLL World Middleweight Champion and various feuds (2021–2023) ====
On December 10, Soberano Jr. defeated Templario in the finals to become the new CMLL World Middleweight Champion. They were paired for the Torneo Nacional de Parejas Increíbles on February 25, 2022, defeating Cavernario and Titán in the quarter-finals, but lost to Averno and Místico in the semi-finals. He lost the title to Dragón Rojo Jr. on April 2.

On May 17, Soberano Jr. failed to win Templario's Mexican National Middleweight Championship after suffering an injury three minutes into the match. Three days later, he entered the La Copa Junior, defeating Roja in the first round before losing to Místico in the semi-finals. In their rematch on May 31, Templario retained the title. On June 24, he and Euforia defeated Gran Guerrero and Último Guerrero to win the family-oriented Copa Dinastías ("Dynasties Cup") tournament. After winning a semi-final torneo cibernetico, Soberano Jr. advanced to the finals of the Leyenda de Plata on July 29, losing to Templario. Following the match, he challenged Templario to a mask vs. mask Lucha de Apuestas at the CMLL 89th Anniversary Show on September 16, which the latter accepted. However, it never occurred as Templario withdrew from the event due to injury, with Soberano Jr.'s other rival Dragón Rojo Jr. offering to take his place. At the event, they lost a Relevos Suicidas match to Atlantis Jr. and Stuka Jr., who advanced to the Lucha de Apuestas against each other. On December 16, he partnered with Halcón Suriano Jr. for the Torneo Gran Alternativa, defeating Neón and Stuka Jr. in the first round before losing in the semi-finals to Gran Guerrero and Raider.

Soberano Jr. was eliminated by Templario during the Reyes del Aire VIP ("Kings of the Air VIP") tournament on January 27, 2023. The following month, both men were once again paired for the Torneo Nacional de Parejas Increíbles, defeating Atlantis Jr. and Guerrero in the first round and Dragón Rojo Jr. and Titán in the semi-finals, before losing in the finals to Averno and Místico on February 17. He and Dragón Rojo Jr. then advanced to the finals of the La Copa Junior VIP on May 26, with Soberano Jr. winning the tournament. At the CMLL 90th Anniversary Show on September 16, he and Titán lost to Lince Dorado and Samuray del Sol. On October 20, Soberano Jr. and Euforia unsuccessfully challenged Ángel de Oro and Roja for the CMLL World Tag Team Championship.

==== Rúdo turn (2023–present) ====
On November 3, following a loss to Máscara Dorada and Mistico, Soberano Jr., aided by Euforia, attacked partner Volador Jr. and declared he was joining the rúdo side. He solidified his turn by cheating to defeat Volador Jr. in a singles match the following week. On February 6, 2024, he was eliminated by Místico in the Reyes del Aire. The next month, Soberano Jr. and Atlantis Jr. defeated Disturbio and Virus and Hechicero and Stuka Jr. to advance to the finals of that year's Torneo Nacional de Parejas Increíbles at Homenaje a Dos Leyendas on March 29, which they lost to Dorada and Rocky Romero after Soberano Jr. betrayed and unmasked his partner. At the CMLL 91st Anniversary Show on September 13, he teamed with Ángel de Oro and Roja to defeat Neón, Star Jr. and Templario. On September 27, at Noche de Campeones ("Night of Champions"), he unsuccessfully challenged Atlantis Jr. for his NWA World Historic Light Heavyweight Championship. In March 2025, Soberano Jr. revealed that he would undergo surgery the following month due to an injury, sidelining him for seven months.

Soberano Jr. returned from injury on November 7. Commenting on his return match, Dave Meltzer of the Wrestling Observer Newsletter called Soberano Jr. a "huge star, probably more than most recognized", noting that he was cheered by the female fans despite being a rúdo. Later that month, he defeated Ángel de Oro, Euforia, Hechicero and Último Guerrero to qualify for the three-way finals of the Leyenda de Azul on November 28, which Cavernario won. He unsuccessfully challenged for Místico's CMLL World Light Heavyweight Championship on December 12, and Atlantis Jr.'s title in a three-way match also involving Averno on February 13, 2026. In August, Soberano Jr. began feuding with Bandido after both men were simultaneously disqualified from the International Gran Prix for tearing each other's masks off. He accused Bandido of turning his back on CMLL twice to "represent a television network", stating that he "went with the competition" (referring to All Elite Wrestling) when offered another opportunity at Arena México. At the CMLL 93rd Anniversary Show on September 18, Soberano Jr. defeated Bandido. At Noche de Campeones on September 25, he failed to win the NWA World Historic Light Heavyweight Championship from Averno.

=== New Japan Pro-Wrestling (2017–present) ===
In January 2017, Soberano Jr. made his New Japan Pro-Wrestling (NJPW) debut by taking part in Fantastica Mania 2017, the annual tour co-produced by NJPW and CMLL. He returned for the following year's Fantastica Mania 2018 tour, successfully defending the Mexican National Welterweight Championship against Sansón during the sixth night on January 19, 2018. In October, Soberano Jr. and Volador Jr. were revealed as participants in the 2018 Super Junior Tag League. They finished in last place and failed to advance to the finals with a record of two wins and five losses. In January 2019, Soberano Jr. participated in the Fantastica Mania 2019 tour. He returned in August to compete in the Super J-Cup, defeating Romero in the first round before losing to Carístico in the quarter-finals.

On February 27, 2023, during the fifth night of the Fantastica Mania 2023 tour, Soberano Jr. unsuccessfully challenged Titán for the CMLL World Welterweight Championship. At Fighting Spirit Unleashed on October 28, he teamed with Adrian Quest, Romero and Tiger Mask in a loss to Atlantis, Atlantis Jr., Hiroshi Tanahashi and Místico. The following month, Soberano Jr. was paired with Atlantis Jr. for the 2023 World Tag League as part of Block B. Finishing with a record of three wins, three losses and one draw (in their match with Hirooki Goto and Yoshi-Hashi), they failed to advance to the finals. On December 20, Soberano Jr. announced that he signed a one-year deal with NJPW. At the Battle in the Valley pay-per-view on January 13, 2024, he and Romero lost to Dorada and Volador Jr. On February 27, 2026, during the seventh night of the Fantastica Mania 2026 tour, he unsuccessfully challenged Místico for the CMLL World Light Heavyweight Championship.

=== Ring of Honor (2018–2019, 2025) ===
On March 3, 2018, Soberano Jr. made his debut for Ring of Honor (ROH) at Manhattan Mayhem in a loss to Punishment Martinez. At Masters of the Craft on April 14, 2019, he lost to Rush. At Summer Supercard on August 9, he teamed with Carístico and Stuka Jr. to defeat Bárbaro Cavernario, Hechicero and Templario. Soberano Jr. returned to ROH on the February 20, 2025 episode of Ring of Honor Wrestling, where he, Cavernario and Hechicero defeated Dark Panther, Fuego and Sammy Guevara.

=== Revolution Pro Wrestling (2018) ===
Soberano Jr. appeared for Revolution Pro Wrestling (RevPro) at Summer Sizzler on August 17, 2018, in a loss to Titán. Two days later, he unsuccessfully challenged David Starr for the Undisputed British Cruiserweight Championship.

== Championships and accomplishments ==
- Consejo Mundial de Lucha Libre
  - CMLL World Middleweight Championship (1 time)
  - Mexican National Welterweight Championship (1 time)
  - Torneo Gran Alternativa (2017) – with Carístico
  - Torneo Sangre Nueva (2013)
  - La Copa Junior (Nuevo Valores 2017)
  - La Copa Junior VIP (2023)
  - Copa Dinastías (2022) – with Euforia
  - Cuadrangular De Dinastias (2024) – with Euforia
  - Leyenda de Azul (2021)
  - Copa 73 Aniversario de la Arena Puebla (2026)
- Indy Wrestling
  - Copa Indy Wrestling (2026)
- Pro Wrestling Illustrated
  - Ranked No. 84 of the top 500 singles wrestlers in the PWI 500 in 2026

== Luchas de Apuestas record ==
Winner (wager)	Loser (wager)	Location	Event	Date	Notes
Los Principes del Ring (masks) (Soberano Jr. and Star Jr.)	Cholo and Ramstein (masks)	Mexico City	CMLL Martes de Arena Mexico	January 6, 2015	
