= Gran Guerrero =

Mexican professional wrestler (born 1993)

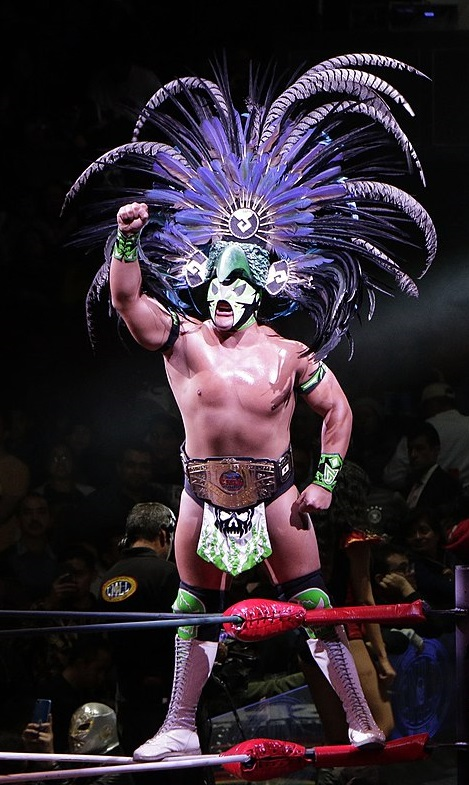
- Gran Guerrero during an entrance in 2018

Personal information
- Born: 1993 (age 32–33) Gómez Palacio, Durango, Mexico
- Relative: Último Guerrero (brother)
- Website: Facebook

Professional wrestling career
- Ring names: Gran Guerrero; Taurus; Último Guerrero Jr.
- Billed height: 1.75 m (5 ft 9 in)
- Billed weight: 95 kg (209 lb)
- Trained by: Virus; Arkangel de la Muerte; Franco Columbo; Último Guerrero
- Debut: 2010

Gran Guerrero (born 1993) is a Mexican professional wrestler signed to Consejo Mundial de Lucha Libre (CMLL), where he is a member of the Los Guerreros Laguneros stable. His real name is not a matter of public record, as is often the case with masked wrestlers in Mexico, where their private lives are kept a secret from the wrestling fans.

He was originally introduced under the ring name Último Guerrero Jr. in 2009 as the storyline son of Último Guerrero, and later made his wrestling debut under the name Taurus. In 2013, he was re-introduced under the ring name "Gran Guerrero", officially acknowledging that he was Guerrero's younger brother. Gran Guerrero's highest-profile match of his career was a Lucha de Apuestas ("bet match") victory over Niebla Roja in the main event of the CMLL 84th Anniversary Show, forcing his opponent to unmask after his loss. He is a one-time and longest reigning CMLL World Heavyweight Champion, one-time CMLL World Tag Team Champion and two-time CMLL World Trios Champion with Guerrero and Euforia. He has also wrestled in Japan for New Japan Pro-Wrestling (NJPW), and in the United States for Ring of Honor (ROH).

== Professional wrestling career ==
=== Early career (2009–2012) ===
In February 2009, Último Guerrero introduced "Último Guerrero Jr." to the public, revealing that he was training for a professional wrestling career. At the time, he was introduced as Guerrero's son, although it is typical for masked wrestlers to be presented as blood relatives without a true familial connection, merely paying for the rights to use the mask and name. It was later confirmed that a blood relationship existed between them, though not as father and son.

He made his in-ring debut as "Taurus" to hide his family relationship, wrestling sporadically for local independent promotions in 2010 and 2011 before regularly appearing for International Wrestling Revolution Group (IWRG), especially at events featuring wrestlers attending their training school, Futuro Idolos de Lucha Libre (FILL). He competed in the 13th, 14th, and 17th Torneo FILL, all of which he failed to win. On July 23, he lost to Maquina Infernal in the Copa Higher Power tournament. On March 11, 2012, Taurus teamed with older brother Último Guerrero for the first time in Toryumon Mexico's Copa Toyota tournament, where a rookie and veteran pair up. The brothers defeated El Hijo del Fantasma and Magnus in the first round before losing to the team of Último Dragón and Angélico in the finals.

=== Consejo Mundial de Lucha Libre (2012–present) ===
==== Taurus (2012–2013) ====
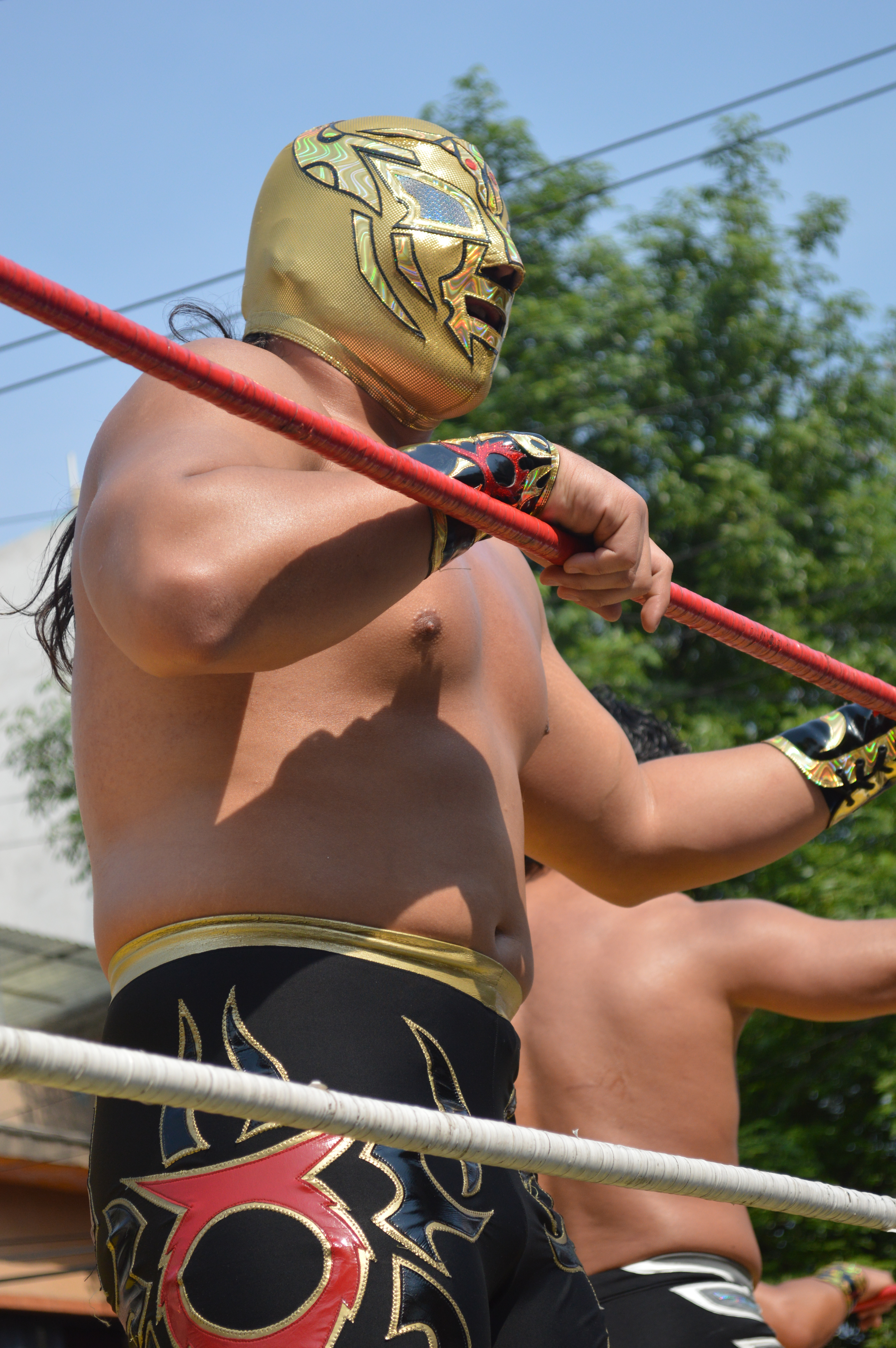
Taurus in January 2013

Taurus made his Consejo Mundial de Lucha Libre (CMLL) debut as part of Generacion 2012, a group of young wrestlers who made their debut in 2012, involving Guerrero Negro Jr., Espanto Jr., Akuma, Herodes Jr., Oro Jr. and Génesis. In his first match on June 18, Taurus, Bobby Zavala and Hooligan lost to Leono, Metálico and Sensei. Taurus was the last of the group to debut on CMLL's main show, Super Viernes, as he teamed with Zayco to lose to Leono and Metálico on September 28. On October 14, Taurus worked a Toryumon benefit show for injured wrestler Electrico, where he, El Hijo del Medico Asesino and El Hijo del Signo defeated Magnus, Mr. Rolling and Platino. In early 2013, Taurus teamed up with Zumba to compete in Toryumon's 16th 2Torneo Juvenil Copa Dragon ("Young Dragon Tournament"), defeating Akuma and Guerrero Negro Jr. in the quarter-finals, but losing to Los Hermanos Celestick in the semi-finals.

Less than two months later, CMLL held their second annual Torneo Sangre Nueva ("The New Blood Tournament"), which focused on younger wrestlers in hopes of promoting them to higher levels of competition. Taurus participated in "Block B" on March 5; the field also included Genesis, Oro Jr., Robin, Sensei, Super Halcón Jr., Disturbio, Guerrero Negro Jr., Inquisidor and Zayco. He won the torneo cibernetico elimination match, eliminating Sensei and Guerrero Negro Jr. to earn a spot in the finals the following week against Soberano Jr., who defeated Taurus to win the tournament. Shortly after, Taurus was announced as one of the novatos ("rookies') in the Torneo Gran Alternativa ("Great Alternative Tournament"), which pairs a rookie with an experienced wrestler. On April 12, he and veteran Averno defeated La Máscara and Stigma in the first round, but lost to Atlantis and Hombre Bala Jr. in the second round.

==== Gran Guerrero (2013–present) ====
On May 3, Taurus was re-introduced as "Gran Guerrero" and helped his brother Último Guerrero attack Atlantis and tear his mask apart, joining Los Guerreros del Infierno. They and Niebla Roja defeated then-CMLL World Trios Champions Los Estetas del Aire (Máscara Dorada, Místico and Valiente) at Homenaje a Dos Leyendas ("Homage to Two Legends") on March 21, 2014. On February 27, 2015, Gran Guerrero and tecnico Stuka Jr. teamed in the Torneo Nacional de Parejas Increíbles ("National Incredible Pairs Tournament"), defeating Blue Panther and Felino in the first round before losing to El Terrible and Máximo in the quarter-finals. He failed to win Ángel de Oro's CMLL World Light Heavyweight Championship on March 1 and La Sombra's NWA World Historic Middleweight Championship on June 29. For the following year's Torneo Nacional de Parejas Increíbles on April 22, 2016, he and Atlantis defeated Brazo de Plata and Kraneo in the first round and Dragon Lee and La Máscara in the quarter-finals, but lost to Carístico and Cibernético in the semi-finals. At the CMLL 83rd Anniversary Show on September 2, Los Guerreros Laguneros unsuccessfully challenged El Sky Team (Místico, Valiente and Volador Jr.) for the CMLL World Trios Championship. On November 18, he competed in the Leyenda de Azul ("The Blue Legend") tournament, which his brother won.

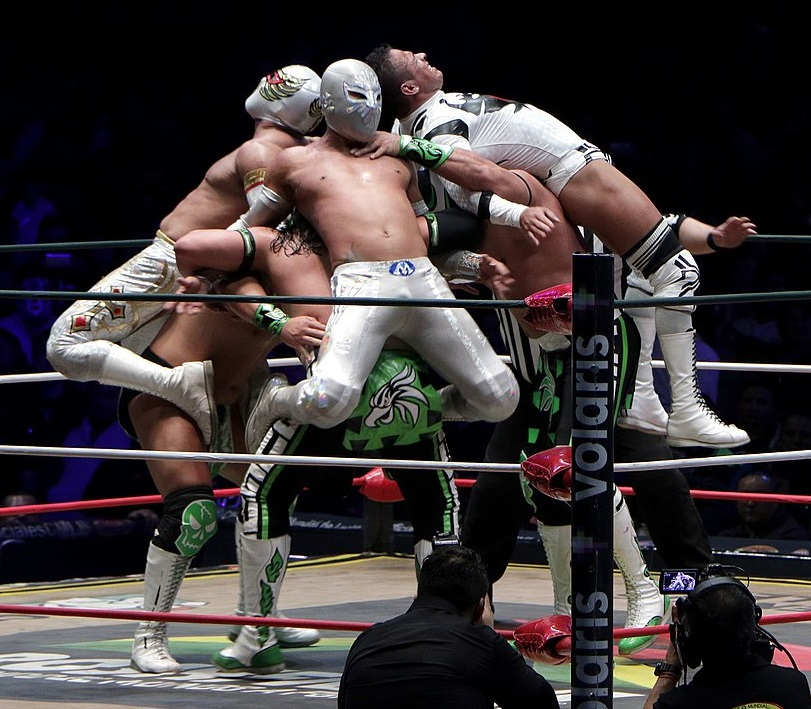
Gran Guerrero, Último Guerrero and Euforia performing a triple team move on their opponents in November 2018

At Homenaje a Dos Leyendas on March 17, 2017, Los Guerreros lost to Lee, Stuka Jr. and Titán. During this time, Roja entered a storyline where he accidentally caused fellow teammates Euforia and Gran Guerrero to lose matches due to miscommunication. On May 19, he left the stable, kicking Último Guerrero in the face during a match, resulting in both Guerreros attacking Roja, tearing off his mask and demanding him to come up with a new one. On June 6, Gran Guerrero was the second wrestler eliminated by Rey Bucanero in a torneo cibernetico for the vacant CMLL World Heavyweight Championship. The rivalry between the Guerreros and Roja culminated in a Lucha de Apuestas ("bet match") in the main event of the CMLL 84th Anniversary Show on September 16, where Gran Guerrero defeated Roja, forcing him to unmask afterward. During the Torneo Nacional de Parejas Increíbles on February 2, 2018, they defeated Blue Panther and Sam Adonis in the first round, but lost to Místico and Mephisto in the quarter-finals. On July 1, Los Guerreros defeated El Sky Team for the CMLL World Trios Championship. They lost it to former Lucha Libre AAA Worldwide stars "The Cl4n" (Ciber the Main Man, The Chris and Sharlie Rockstar) at the CMLL 85th Anniversary Show on September 14, but regained it on September 28. On October 2, Gran Guerrero unsuccessfully challenged Carístico for the NWA World Historic Middleweight Championship. Seven days later, he failed to win a torneo cibernetico to determine the next challengers for the CMLL World Heavyweight Championship, although he was able to eliminate Volcano.

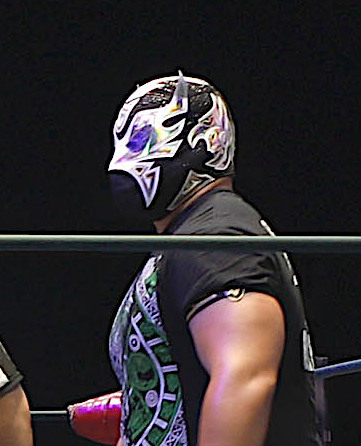
Guerrero in 2020

Gran Guerrero participated in the Universal Championship tournament on February 1, 2019, defeating Valiente in the first round, but lost to El Terrible in the quarter-finals. They retained the title at Homenaje a Dos Leyendas on March 15 against Caristico, Lee and Volador Jr. At Juicio Final ("Final Judgement") on May 31, Gran Guerrero and Euforia defeated Diamante Azul and Valiente for the CMLL World Tag Team Championship, becoming a double champion. At the CMLL 86th Anniversary Show on September 27, they and Soberano Jr. lost to Ángel de Oro, Mephisto and Roja. On October 14, Gran Guerrero unsuccessfully challenged Roja for the CMLL World Light Heavyweight Championship. On November 1, they lost the title to Caristico and Místico at Día de Muertos ("Day of the Dead"). Los Guerreros lost the CMLL World Trios Championship to Nueva Generación Dinamita (El Cuatrero, Forastero and Sansón) on March 26, 2021, after which Euforia left the group. On September 10, Gran Guerrero outlasted eleven wrestlers to advance to the finals of the Copa Independencia ("Independence Cup") tournament, which he lost to Volador Jr. seven days later at Homenaje a Dos Leyendas. On March 4, 2022, he participated in a tournament for the Mexican National Heavyweight Championship, defeating El Sagrado in the quarter-finals and El Terrible in the semi-finals, before losing to Euforia in the finals.

Gran Guerrero defeated Hechicero on November 7 to win the CMLL World Heavyweight Championship for the first time in his career. After being eliminated by Euforia in that month's Leyenda de Azul, he made his first successful title defense against Euforia on December 5. That same month, he and Raider participated in the Torneo Gran Alternativa, defeating Valiente and Valiente Jr. and Halcón Suriano Jr. and Soberano Jr. en route to the finals, which they lost to Místico and Panterita del Ring Jr. On April 21, 2023, he was the last wrestler eliminated by Dragón Rojo Jr. in the ten-way semi-finals of the Universal Championship tournament. He made further successful defenses against Yota on May 14 and Euforia on November 17. On March 15, 2024, he and Euforia lost to Ángel de Oro and Flip Gordon in the first round of the Torneo Nacional de Parejas Increíbles. On August 27, he again retained the title against Yota, who got himself disqualified. On April 11, 2025, Gran Guerrero lost to Akuma in the first round of the Universal Championship tournament. After seven successful defenses, Gran Guerrero lost his championship to Claudio Castagnoli on November 28, ending his record-setting reign at 1,117 days.

=== New Japan Pro-Wrestling (2015–2019) ===
In January 2015, Gran Guerrero made his New Japan Pro-Wrestling (NJPW) debut, taking part in the CMLL and NJPW co-produced Fantastica Mania 2015 tour. He and Último Guerrero participated in the tour's one night tag team tournament on January 17, defeating Stigma and Volador Jr. in the first round and Cometa and Stuka Jr. in the semi-finals, before losing to Atlantis and Máscara Dorada in the finals. The next day, Gran Guerrero unsuccessfully challenged Volador Jr. for the NWA World Historic Welterweight Championship.

Gran Guerrero returned to Japan for a six-man tag team match during the Super J-Cup finals on August 21, 2016, in which he, Euforia and Último Guerrero lost to Carístico, Titán and Volador Jr. During the Fantastica Mania 2018 tour in January 2018, Gran Guerrero unsuccessfully challenged Niebla Roja for the CMLL World Light Heavyweight Championship. The Guerrero brothers subsequently won the tour's "Brothers tag team tournament", defeating Ángel de Oro and Roja in the first round, followed by defeating Dragon Lee and Místico in the finals. Gran Guerrero last competed for NJPW as part of the Fantastica Mania 2019 tour in January 2019.

=== Ring of Honor (2025) ===
Guerrero made his debut for Ring of Honor (ROH) on the February 27, 2025 episode of ROH Wrestling, teaming with Euforia and Rocky Romero in a loss to Atlantis, Esfinge and Fuego. The following week, he, Euforia and Valiente lost to Los Divinos Laguneros (Blue Panther, Blue Panther Jr. and Dark Panther).

== Personal life ==
Gran Guerrero was born in 1993 in Gómez Palacio, Durango, Mexico. His real name is not a matter of public record, as is often the case with masked wrestlers in Mexico who have not been unmasked. It is traditional for an enmascarado to conceal their private lives from wrestling fans, supported by the media generally not reporting on masked wrestlers birth names. He was originally presented as the son of José Gutiérrez Hernández (Último Guerrero) in 2009, but it was later confirmed that he was, actually, the 20-year younger brother of Gutiérrez.

== Championships and accomplishments ==
Gran Guerrero is a former CMLL World Trios Champion

- Consejo Mundial de Lucha Libre
  - CMLL World Heavyweight Championship (1 time)
  - CMLL World Tag Team Championship (1 time) – with Euforia
  - CMLL World Trios Championship (2 times) – with Euforia and Último Guerrero
- Federación Mundial de Lucha Libre
  - FMLL Tag Team Championship (1 time) – with Último Guerrero
- New Japan Pro-Wrestling
  - CMLL's Brother Tag Team Tournament (2018) – with Último Guerrero
- Pro Wrestling Illustrated
  - Ranked No. 173 of the top 500 singles wrestlers in the PWI 500 in 2021
- Toryumon Mexico
  - Dragon Scramble (2013)

== Lucha de Apuestas record ==
Winner (wager)	Loser (wager)	Location	Event	Date	Notes
Gran Guerrero (mask)	Niebla Roja (mask)	Mexico City	CMLL 84th Anniversary Show	September 16, 2017	
