= El Cuatrero =

Mexican professional wrestler (born 1996)

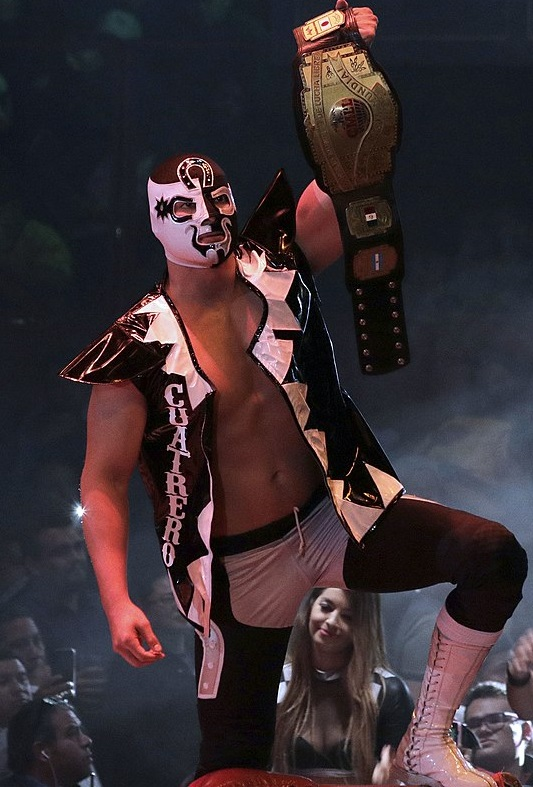
- El Cuatrero holding the CMLL World Middleweight Championship in the air, November 2018

Personal information
- Born: Rogelio Reyes N. 1996 (age 29–30) Lagos de Moreno, Jalisco, Mexico
- Family: Cien Caras (father); Sansón (brother); Máscara Año 2000 (uncle); Universo 2000 (uncle); Forastero (cousin); Universo 2000 Jr. (cousin); Máscara Año 2000 Jr. (cousin)

Professional wrestling career
- Ring names: El Cuatrero; Máscara Universal
- Billed height: 185 cm (6 ft 1 in)
- Billed weight: 94 kg (207 lb)
- Trained by: Universo 2000; Último Guerrero; Virus; Franco Columbo
- Debut: 2010

Rogelio Reyes N. (born 1996), better known by his ring name El Cuatrero, is a Mexican professional wrestler. He is best known for his work with Consejo Mundial de Lucha Libre (CMLL).

He is the son of legendary professional wrestler Cien Caras, and the nephew of Máscara Año 2000 and Universo 2000. Cuatrero, his brother Sansón and their cousin Forastero form a trio known as Nueva Generación Dinamita ("New Generation Dynamite"), presented as the successors to Los Hermanos Dinamita, which was formed by Cien Caras, Máscara Año 2000 and Universo 2000. His ring name is Spanish for "The Horsethief" or "The Cattle Rustler", which is reflected in his cowboy-inspired ring gear and mask.

El Cuatrero is a former CMLL World Middleweight Champion, Mexican National Trios Champion and Occidente Trios Champion (holding both titles with Sansón and Forastero). At one point, he held four championships simultaneously in CMLL, as he and Sansón also held the CMLL Arena Coliseo Tag Team Championship. He also won the mask of Ángel de Oro in the main event of Homenaje a Dos Leyendas in March 2018. In Lucha Libre AAA Worldwide (AAA), he is a former AAA World Tag Team Champion and AAA World Trios Champion with his brother and cousin.

On March 10, 2023, El Cuatrero was arrested on an arrest warrant in Mexico City and charged with attempted femicide and domestic violence against his former girlfriend and fellow professional wrestler Stephanie Vaquer. In May 2026, Cuatrero was found guilty and sentenced to 12 years and eight months in prison.

== Early life ==
Rogelio Reyes N. was born in 1996, the son of professional wrestler Carmelo Reyes González, better known under the ring name Cien Caras ("100 Faces"). His older brother, known as Sansón ("Samson"), was born in 1994. His uncles Jesús (known as Máscara Año 2000) and Andrés Reyes González (Universo 2000) were also professional wrestlers. Several of the Reyes sons followed their fathers into professional wrestling, including Forastero, Universo 2000 Jr. and Máscara Año 2000 Jr. Initially, Carmelo Reyes did not want his sons to become professional wrestlers, wanting them to get an education instead. He reluctantly agreed that they could learn lucha Libre from their uncle Andrés, but only as a hobby, not a career. During their training, Carmelo noticed how seriously both sons took the business and reluctantly agreed to let them become professional wrestlers.

There is a long tradition of wrestlers paying for the right to use a ring name in Mexican wrestling, including being allowed to portray a second or third-generation wrestler without being related to the originator of the ring character. It has been confirmed that wrestlers Cien Caras Jr. and El Hijo de Cien Caras are unrelated to the Reyes family, while it is unclear if Hijo de Máscara Año 2000 is actually a blood relative or if the relationship is purely fictional. Carmelo Reyes later stated that he allowed the "Cien Caras" name to be rented by other wrestlers as his sons were very young and might not want to become professional wrestlers.

== Professional wrestling career ==
While the El Cuatrero name was first used in 2014, Sansón said that he and his brother made their in-ring debut around the year 2010 and worked locally in Lagos de Moreno while finishing school. In an interview, Cuatrero said that he wrestled briefly as "Máscara Universal", but his father did not like the name and instead suggested he change it to "El Cuatrero" ("The Cattle Rustler"); the character was inspired by the cowboy gimmick that his father and his uncles had used during their careers. During their time working locally in Lagos de Moreno, the duo won their first Lucha de Apuestas ("bet match") against Los Centellas (I and II), who were forced to unmask, per lucha libre traditions.

=== Consejo Mundial de Lucha Libre (2014–2021) ===
The Reyes brothers wrestled locally until working in Guadalajara for the local Consejo Mundial de Lucha Libre (CMLL) promoters at Arena Coliseo in early 2014; they trained at the CMLL wrestling school under Último Guerrero, Virus and Franco Colombo. The Reyes brothers made their CMLL debut alongside Universo 2000 on March 25, 2014, losing to Blue Panther, Sagrado and Valiente. On January 30, 2015, El Cuatrero and Sansón competed in a tournament to determine the number one contenders for the local Occidente Tag Team Championship, but were eliminated by Flash and Flash II in the first round. Months later, the brothers teamed with Jocker in a tournament for the championship, but lost to Furia Roja, Mr. Trueno and Ray Trueno in the finale on May 3. On November 1, El Cuatrero, Sansón and their cousin Forastero defeated them to capture the Occidente Trios Championship.

El Cuatrero made his Mexico City debut at CMLL's main venue, Arena México, on January 5, 2016, where he was the third wrestler eliminated in the semi-final torneo cibernetico of the La Copa Junior ("The Junior Cup") tournament. At that point, the Reyes brothers began being referred to as Nueva Generación Dinamita ("New Generation Dynamite"; NGD), a reference to their heritage. On March 18, they defeated Soberano Jr. and Oro Jr. in the opening match of Homenaje a Dos Leyendas ("Homage to Two Legends"). Four days later, El Cuatrero was paired with Rey Bucanero in the annual Torneo Gran Alternativa ("Great Alternative Tournament"), where younger wrestlers team up with established veterans, losing to Místico and Tritón in the first round. A year later, on June 2, 2017, El Cuatrero was paired with his uncle Máscara Año 2000 for that year's Torneo Gran Alternativa, but lost in the first round by Atlantis and Esfinge. Despite early limited success, Nueva Generación Dinamita's booking experienced a turning point on July 22, when he and Sansón defeated Black Terry and Negro Navarro to win the CMLL Arena Coliseo Tag Team Championship. Three days later, the trio defeated Los Hijos del Infierno (Ephesto, Luciferno and Mephisto) to win the Mexican National Trios Championship, making El Cuatrero a triple champion. On September 16, they lost to Diamante Azul, Marco Corleone and Valiente at the CMLL 84th Anniversary Show. On November 24, the trio won the family-oriented Copa Dinastías ("Dynasties Cup") tournament, defeating the trios of Blue Panther, Blue Panther Jr. and The Panther, and then Dragon Lee, Místico and Pierroth.

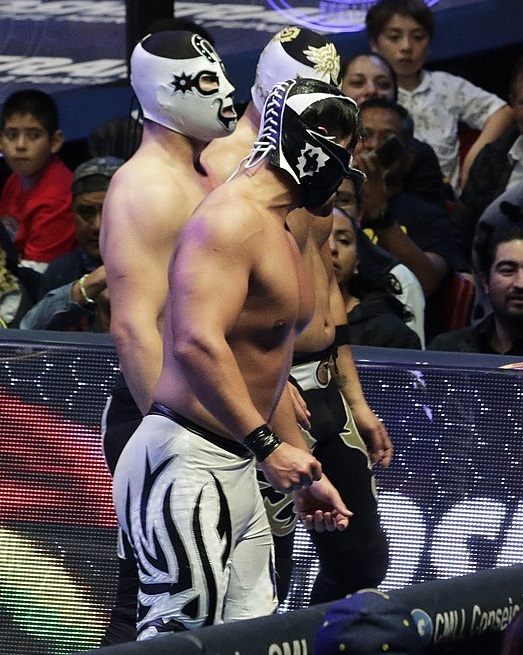
Sansón, El Cuatrero and Forastero outside the ring in November 2018

On January 19, 2018, at Fantastica Mania 2018, El Cuatrero defeated Ángel de Oro, as part of an ongoing storyline feud between the two, to win the CMLL World Middleweight Championship, holding four championships simultaneously. Challenges for a mask vs. mask Lucha de Apuestas soon followed and was made official for Homenaje a Dos Leyendas. They were paired for the Torneo Nacional de Parejas Increíbles ("National Incredible Pairs Tournament"), in which a rudo (the "bad guy") and a tecnico (the "good guy") team up, but lost to Atlantis and Mr. Niebla in the first round on February 9. On February 14, Nueva Generación Dinamita announced that they were giving up the CMLL Arena Coliseo Tag Team Championship to focus on winning the more prestigious CMLL World Tag Team Championship. In the main event of Homenaje a Dos Leyendas on March 16, El Cuatrero defeated Ángel de Oro, forcing him to remove his mask and state his birth name. On April 22, Nueva Generación Dinamita defeated Ángel de Oro, his brother Niebla Roja and Soberano Jr. to retain the Mexican National Trios Championship. El Cuatrero made his first and second successful defense of the CMLL World Middleweight Championship, respectively, against Ángel de Oro on June 1 and July 16. At the CMLL 85th Anniversary Show on September 14, Nueva Generación Dinamita defeated Atlantis, Místico and Soberano Jr. On October 26, El Cuatrero was involved in a torneo cibernetico to determine the number one contender for the Rey del Inframundo ("King of the Underworld") championship, where he eliminated Audaz and Flyer, before being the second to last wrestler eliminated by Esfinge. On November 6, Cuatrero made his third successful title defense against Titán.

At Sin Piedad ("No Mercy") on January 1, 2019, El Cuatrero, Forastero and Templario lost to Lee, Penta 0M and King Phoenix. Three days later, Nueva Generación Dinamita again retained their title over Ángel de Oro, Roja and Soberano Jr. On February 4, El Cuatrero participated in the Universal Championship tournament, where all sixteen participants held a CMLL-recognized championship, defeating perennial rival Soberano Jr. in the first round before losing to Último Guerrero in the quarter-finals. At Homenaje a Dos Leyendas on March 15, Nueva Generación Dinamita defeated Bárbaro Cavernario, Gilbert el Boricua and Negro Casas. They made yet another successful title defense against the Ángel de Oro, Roja and Soberano Jr. trio on April 9. For the Torneo Nacional de Parejas Increíbles nine days later, El Cuatrero was paired with Místico, defeating Hechicero and Stuka Jr. in the first round and Atlantis and Casas in the quarter-finals, before losing to Guerrero and Volador Jr. in the semi-finals. At the CMLL 86th Anniversary Show on September 27, Nueva Generación Dinamita successfully defended the Mexican National Trios Championship against Carístico, Místico and Valiente. On December 12, El Cuatrero made his fourth successful CMLL World Middleweight Championship defense against Carístico.

El Cuatrero and Sansón unsuccessfully challenged Carístico and Místico for the CMLL World Tag Team Championship at Sin Piedad on January 1, 2020. On February 21, he and Valiente lost to Atlantis Jr. and Casas in the first round of that year's Torneo Nacional de Parejas Increíbles. Three days later, El Cuatrero and Sansón won the Torneo de Parejas Familiares ("Family Team Tournament"), defeating the uncle/nephew team of Rey Bucanero and Drone in the first round, the father/son team of Euforia and Soberano Jr. in the second round, and the Gran Guerrero/Último Guerrero brothers in the finals. At the CMLL 87th Anniversary Show on September 25, Nueva Generación Dinamita retained the Mexican National Trios Championship against Virus, Cancerbero and Raziel. On March 26, 2021, they defeated Los Guerreros Laguneros (Euforia, Gran Guerrero and Último Guerrero) to win the CMLL World Trios Championship. On August 10, CMLL announced the departure of Nueva Generación Dinamita, effectively vacating both the CMLL World Trios Championship and the CMLL World Middleweight Championship.

=== New Japan Pro-Wrestling (2018–2020) ===
El Cuatrero made his debut for New Japan Pro-Wrestling (NJPW) in January 2018 as part of the NJPW and CMLL co-produced Fantastica Mania 2018 tour. On January 19, El Cuatrero defeated Ángel de Oro to win the CMLL World Middleweight Championship. 2019 was the first year that all three members of Nueva Generación Dinamita participated in the Fantastica Mania 2019 tour, capping off the tour with a successful Mexican National Trios Championship defense against Ángel de Oro, Atlantis, and Titán on the last day. During the Fantastica Mania 2020 tour in January 2020, Cuatrero and his brother participated in the family tag team tournament, where they ended up defeating Los Hermanos Chavez (Ángel de Oro and Niebla Roja) in the finals. On the final day of the tour, January 20, NGD successfully defended the Mexican National Trios Championship against Los Hermanos Chávez and Titán.

=== Lucha Libre AAA Worldwide (2021–2023) ===
Nueva Generación Dinamita made their debut for Lucha Libre AAA Worldwide (AAA) on August 14, 2021, at Triplemanía XXIX, attacking Mr. Iguana, Aramís and Octagon Jr.. The trio entered a feud with El Poder del Norte (Tito Santana, Carta Brava Jr. and Mocho Cota Jr.), leading to a No Disqualification match at Héroes Inmortales XIV on October 9, which NGD won. At Triplemanía Regia II on December 4, they won a three-way match against El Poder del Norte and Los Vipers (Abismo Negro Jr., Arez and Psicosis) to become the number one contenders for the AAA World Trios Championship. On August 5, 2022, at Verano de Escándalo, Nueva Generación Dinamita defeated La Empresa (DMT Azul, Puma King and Sam Adonis) to win the titles. After Cuatrero's femicide case in March 2023, he was replaced by Hijo de Máscara Año 2000, who held the titles with Sansón and Forastero until losing them at Verano de Escándalo on July 21, 2023.

=== Independent circuit (2014–2026) ===
While working for CMLL, Cuatrero, like all CMLL workers, was allowed to take independent circuit work on days he was not booked for a CMLL show or appearance. On February 19, 2017, Cuatrero and Sansón unsuccessfully challenged Black Terry and Negro Navarro for the CMLL Arena Coliseo Tag Team Championship at a Lucha Memes show in Puebla. NGD also successfully defended the Mexican National Trios Championship against Los Kamikazes del Aire (Alas de Acero, Aramis, and Iron Kid) at a subsequent Lucha Memes show.

As part of CMLL's collaboration with The Crash Lucha Libre, Nueva Generación Dinamita appeared on several The Crash shows over the years. In their initial appearance for The Crash, Nueva Generación Dinamita lost to La Rebelión Amarilla (Bestia 666, Jacob Fatu and Mecha Wolf 450). The team returned to The Crash for their VII Anniversary Show on November 3, 2018, where they lost to Los Lucha Bros (Penta El 0M and The King) in a match for The Crash Tag Team Championship that also included Reno Scum (Adam Thornstowe and Luster the Legend). They returned to The Crash in December, losing to Bestia 666 and Garza Jr. In 2019, Cuatrero and Sansón began an extended storyline against Los Traumas (Trauma I and Trauma II). In June, Sansón was forced to team up with Trauma I to face Cuatrero and Trauma I in a relevos increíbles ("incredible pairs" match), where the regular partners refused to wrestle against each other. In the end, Sansón and Trauma I won after Trauma II hit El Cuatrero during the match. This was followed by a tag team match where NGD defeated Los Traumas by disqualification as part of their ongoing storyline.

On June 26, 2019, Cuatrero, Forastero and Sansón appeared at International Wrestling Revolution Group (IWRG)'s annual Festival de las Máscaras show. The trio defeated their cousin Máscara Año 2000 Jr., who teamed up with Capo del Sur and Capo del Norte.

== Femicide case and prosecution ==
On March 4, 2023, CMLL wrestler Stephanie Vaquer filed a domestic violence criminal complaint against Reyes, who had worked with her in the past for Consejo Mundial de Lucha Libre (CMLL). According to the complaint, Cuatrero forced onto her by choking her and throwing her against a wall. On March 9, CMLL released a statement stating that they "energetically condemn any form of violence against women and reiterate our commitment to promote a life free of violence and harassment in our staff and attendees to our arenas." On March 10, after a show for AAA in the city of Aguascalientes, Reyes was arrested on an arrest warrant in Mexico City and charged with attempted femicide and domestic violence. Although he was denied parole in June 2024, he was released in March 2025, pending the further prosecution of Reyes by the prosecutor's office of Mexico City. A rumored motion of forgiveness from Vaquer was vigorously denied by the office. In May 2026, Reyes was found guilty and sentenced to 12 years and eight months in prison.

== Championships and accomplishments ==
- Consejo Mundial de Lucha Libre

- CMLL World Middleweight Championship (1 time)
- CMLL World Trios Championship (1 time) – with Forastero and Sansón
- CMLL Arena Coliseo Tag Team Championship (1 time) – with Sansón
- Mexican National Trios Championship (1 time) – with Sansón and Forastero
- Occidente Trios Championship (1 time) – with Sansón and Forastero
- La Copa Dinastia (2017) – with Sansón and Forastero
- Torneo de parejas familiares (2020) – with Sansón

- Lucha Libre AAA Worldwide
  - AAA World Trios Championship (1 time) – with Forastero and Sansón
- New Japan Pro-Wrestling
  - Torneo de Parejas Familiares (2020) – with Sansón
- Pro Wrestling Illustrated
  - Ranked No. 225 of the top 500 singles wrestlers in the PWI 500 in 2021
- Other titles
  - Vive Latino Championship (1 time)

== Luchas de Apuestas record ==
Winner (wager)	Loser (wager)	Location	Event	Date	Notes
El Cuatrero and Sansón (masks)	Los Centellas (I and II)	N/A	Live show	N/A	
El Cuatrero (mask)	Ángel de Oro (mask)	Arena Mexico	Homenaje a Dos Leyendas	March 16, 2018	
El Cuatrero (mask)	Fresero Jr. (hair)	Arena Lopez Mateos	Live show	February 25, 2023	(Note: 8-man cage match also featuring Sansón, Forastero, Hijo de Máscara Año 2000, Demonio Infernal, Trauma I & Trauma II)
El Cuatrero (mask)	Los Centellas (I and II)	Gimnasio Benito Juárez, Cuautitlán	Live show	March 28, 2026	(Note: 8-man match also featuring Hijo de Máscara Año 2000, Hijo de L.A. Park, L.A. Park Jr., Trauma I, Trauma II & Venum)
