= Forastero =

Mexican professional wrestler

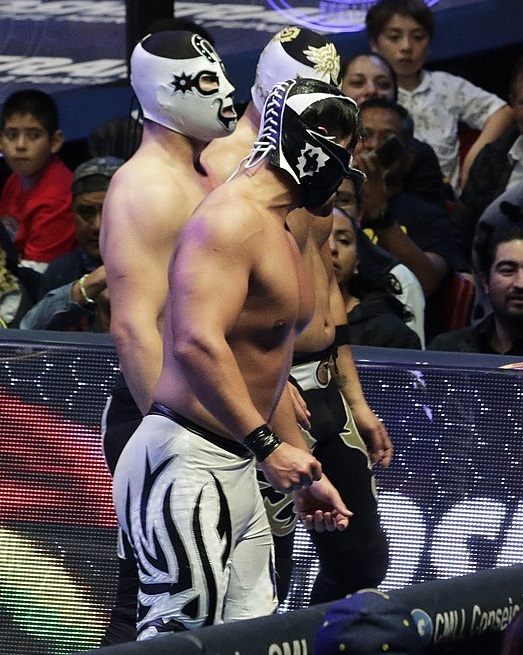
- Forastero (in front), El Cuatrero (middle) and Sansón (back) outside the ring in November 2018

Personal information
- Born: July 30, 1994 (age 32) Lagos de Moreno, Jalisco, Mexico
- Family: Cien Caras (uncle); Máscara Año 2000 (uncle); Universo 2000 (uncle); Hijo de Máscara Año 2000 (cousin); Universo 2000 Jr. (cousin); Sansón (cousin); El Cuatrero (cousin)

Professional wrestling career
- Billed height: 187 cm (6 ft 2 in)
- Billed weight: 93 kg (205 lb)
- Trained by: Cien Caras; Máscara Año 2000; Universo 2000; Franco Columbo; Virus; Último Guerrero
- Debut: February 15, 2015

Forastero (Spanish: "Outsider"; born July 30, 1994) is the ring name of a Mexican professional wrestler signed to WWE, where he performs in its sister promotion Lucha Libre AAA Worldwide (AAA). He is best known for his work with Consejo Mundial de Lucha Libre (CMLL).

He is a second-generation professional wrestler, being a part of the Reyes family that includes his uncles Cien Caras, Máscara Año 2000 and Universo 2000, as well as cousins El Cuatrero, Sansón, Máscara Año 2000 Jr., and Universo 2000 Jr. His birth name is not a matter of public record, which is a strong tradition for masked wrestlers in Mexico, as their private lives are concealed from wrestling fans.

Forastero regularly teams up with his cousins El Cuatrero and Sansón under the name Nueva Generación Dinamita ("New Generation Dynamites"), continuing the family tradition started by Los Hermanos Dinamita (Cien Caras, Máscara Año 2000 and Universo 2000). They have held the AAA World Tag Team Championship, the AAA World Trios Championship, the CMLL Arena Coliseo Tag Team Championship, the CMLL World Trios Championship, the Mexican National Trios Championship and the Occidente Trios Championship.

== Personal life ==
Forastero was born on July 30, 1994, in Lagos de Moreno, Jalisco, Mexico. At the time of his birth, his maternal uncles Carmelo (known under the ring name Cien Caras), Jesús (Máscara Año 2000) and Andrés Reyes González (Universo 2000), were established professional wrestling headliners in Mexico. As Forastero is a masked professional wrestler, his birth name is not a matter of public record, a tradition in lucha libre where the personal lives of masked wrestlers are concealed from the public. While neither of his parents were wrestlers, he followed in the footsteps of his uncles and received training from all three of them prior to, and following his in-ring debut; several of his cousins such as El Cuatrero, Sansón, Universo 2000 Jr. and Máscara Año 2000 Jr. are also wrestlers. Prior to starting his wrestling career, Forastero briefly played baseball until he suffered a hand injury.

== Professional wrestling career ==
Forastero made his in-ring debut on February 15, 2015, for Leyendas Inmortales de la Lucha Libre (LILL), teaming with his cousins El Cuatrero and Sansón to defeat El Hijo del Mr. Mexico, Mr. Jack Jr. and Tyson la Bestia.

=== Consejo Mundial de Lucha Libre (2015–2021) ===
Twelve days later, Forastero made his debut for Consejo Mundial de Lucha Libre (CMLL) as he teamed up with Flash I and Flash II to defeat his cousins Cuatrero, Sansón, and Rafaga. Initially, Forastero would often face off against his cousins. In April, he was paired with El Hijo del Calavera and Magnum for a tournament to determine the next Occidente Trios Champions. They defeated Dragol, Ebola and Exterminador in the first round, but lost to El Cuatrero, Sansón and Jocker. During the summer, Forastero competed in his first-ever Lucha de Apuestas (or "bet match"), the most prestigious match type in lucha libre. Forastero put his mask on the line in a 12-man steel cage match where the last person in the cage would be forced to unmask. He escaped the cage midway through the match, which was eventually lost by Espectrum, who unmasked afterward. By August, Forastero began teaming with his cousins on a regular basis, with the trio adopting the name La Sangre Dinamita ("Dynamite Blood") and later Nueva Generación Dinamita (NGD; "New Generation Dynamites"), both homages to the Reyes' brothers team, known as Los Hermanos Dinamita. On November 1, NGD defeated Furia Roja, Mr. Trueno and Rey Trueno to win the Occidente Trios Championship.

Forastero made his Mexico City debut in Arena México on October 21, 2016, teaming with his cousins against Blue Panther Jr., Esfinge and The Panther. On April 21, 2017, Forastero was one of 16 second-generation wrestlers in that year's La Copa Junior ("The Junior Cup"), his first major tournament. He eliminated Stigma, but was eliminated by Blue Panther Jr. near the end of the match. Two months later, Forastero and Shocker competed in the 2017 Gran Alternativa tournament, where a rookie is paired with a veteran wrestler for a tag team tournament. The two defeated Stigma and Titán in the first round, but lost to Esfinge and Atlantis in the second round. On July 25, Nueva Generación Dinamita won the Mexican National Trios Championship to their collections by defeating Los Hijos del Infierno ("The Sons of the Inferno"; Ephesto, Luciferno and Mephisto). The trio won CMLL's La Copa Dinastía in November, defeating the trios of Blue Panther, Blue Panther Jr. and The Panther and Dragon Lee, Místico and Pierroth. On March 2, 2018, Forastero and Sansón entered a tournament for the vacant CMLL World Tag Team Championship, but were eliminated in the first round by Lee and Místico. At the CMLL 85th Anniversary Show on September 14, the Dinamitas defeated Atlantis, Soberano Jr. and Místico as part of CMLL's most important show of the year.

In early 2019, Forastero participated in the Universal Championship tournament, where all 16 participants held a championship recognized by CMLL. He lost to Dragon Lee in the opening round. For the 2019 Torneo Nacional de Parejas Increíbles ("National Incredible Teams Tournament), where a rudo (the "bad guy") and a técnico (the "Good guy") team up, Sansón was paired with Flyer. The odd couple were eliminated by Carístico and Mephisto in the first round . As part of the 66th anniversary of Arena Puebla, NGD successfully defended the Mexican National Trios Championship against Los Ingobernables (El Terrible, La Bestia del Ring, and Rush), in what was their tenth overall title defense. Forastero and Carístico were teamed up for the 2020 version of the Torneo Nacional de Parejas Increíbles, qualifying for the finals by defeating Mephisto and Titán, El Felino and Niebla Roja, and Bandido and Último Guerrero in the preliminary block. Two weeks later, on February 28, 2020, Forastero and Carístico defeated Bárbaro Cavernario and Volador Jr. in the finals. On March 26, 2021, they defeated Los Guerreros Laguneros to win the CMLL World Trios Championship. On August 10, CMLL announced the departure of Nueva Generación Dinamita.

=== New Japan Pro-Wrestling (2019–2020) ===
In January 2019, the three members of Nueva Generación Dinamita participated in the annual New Japan Pro-Wrestling (NJPW) and CMLL co-promoted Fantastica Mania tour of Japan, successfully defending the Mexican National Trios Championship against Ángel de Oro, Atlantis, and Titán on January 21, the tour's last day. The following year, during the Fantastica Mania 2020 tour, NGD successfully defended the Mexican National Trios Championship against Los Hermanos Chavez and Titán.

=== Lucha Libre AAA Worldwide (2021–present) ===
Nueva Generación Dinamita made their debut for Lucha Libre AAA Worldwide (AAA) on August 14, 2021, at Triplemanía XXIX, attacking Mr. Iguana, Aramís and Octagon Jr.. The trio entered a feud with El Poder del Norte (Tito Santana, Carta Brava Jr. and Mocho Cota Jr.), leading to a No Disqualification match at Héroes Inmortales XIV on October 9, which NGD won. At Triplemanía Regia II on December 4, they won a three-way match against El Poder del Norte and Los Vipers (Abismo Negro Jr., Arez and Psicosis) to become the number one contenders for the AAA World Trios Championship. On August 5, 2022, at Verano de Escándalo, Nueva Generación Dinamita defeated La Empresa (DMT Azul, Puma King and Sam Adonis) to win the titles. After El Cuatrero's attempted femicide and domestic violence case against Stephanie Vaquer in March 2023, Forastero and Sansón continued to hold the titles, with Hijo de Máscara Año 2000 replacing Cuatrero, until losing them to Los Vipers at Verano de Escándalo on July 21, 2023.

=== Independent circuit (2015–present) ===
While working for CMLL, Forastero, like all CMLL workers, was allowed to take independent circuit bookings on days he was not needed by the company. NGD successfully defended the Mexican National Trios Championship against Los Kamikazes del Aire (Alas de Acero, Aramís, and Iron Kid) at a subsequent Lucha Memes show. On June 16, 2019, Forastero, Cuatrero and Sansón appeared at the International Wrestling Revolution Group (IWRG)'s annual Festival de las Máscaras show. The trio defeated their cousin Máscara Año 2000 Jr., who was teaming with Capo del Sur and Capo del Norte, who both use ring characters inspired by the original Los Dinamitas.

== Championships and accomplishments ==
- Consejo Mundial de Lucha Libre

- CMLL World Trios Championship (1 time) – with El Cuatrero and Sansón
- Mexican National Trios Championship (1 time) – with El Cuatrero and Sansón
- Occidente Trios Championship (1 time) – with El Cuatrero and Sansón
- La Copa dinastía (2017) – with El Cuatrero and Sansón
- Torneo Nacional de Parejas Increíbles (2020) – with Carístico

- Lucha Libre AAA Worldwide
  - AAA World Trios Championship (1 time) – with El Cuatrero and Sansón
  - AAA World Tag Team Championship (2 times) - with Sanson
- Pro Wrestling Illustrated
  - Ranked No. 201 of the top 500 singles wrestlers in the PWI 500 in 2021
