= Sansón (wrestler) =

Mexican professional wrestler

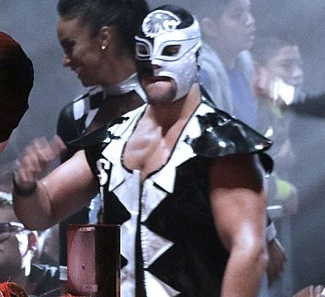
- Sansón, prior to a match in November 2018

Personal information
- Born: Rodrigo Reyes; 1994 (age 31–32) Lagos de Moreno, Jalisco, Mexico
- Family: Cien Caras (father); El Cuatrero (brother); Máscara Año 2000 (uncle); Universo 2000 (uncle); Hijo de Máscara Año 2000 (cousin); Universo 2000 Jr. (cousin); Forastero (cousin)

Professional wrestling career
- Billed height: 187 cm (6 ft 2 in)
- Billed weight: 93 kg (205 lb)
- Trained by: Último Guerrero; Virus; Franco Columbo
- Debut: September 10, 2010

Sansón (Spanish: "Samson"; born 1994) is the ring name of a Mexican luchador enmascarado (or masked professional wrestler) who is signed to WWE, where he performs in its sister promotion Lucha Libre AAA Worldwide (AAA). He is best known for his work with Consejo Mundial de Lucha Libre (CMLL).

While his real name has not been revealed, in keeping with other Mexican masked professional wrestler's traditions, his paternal last name is known as he is the son of Carmelo Reyes González, better known under the ring name Cien Caras. He is the nephew of professional wrestlers Máscara Año 2000 and Universo 2000. Sansón regularly teams up with his brother El Cuatrero and cousin Forastero as a trio known as Nueva Generación Dinamita ("New Generation Dynamite"), after his father and uncles' group Los Hermanos Dinamita. His ring name is Spanish for Samson, which is reflected in the stylized lion's head logo used on his mask and tights.

At one point, Sansón held three different CMLL championships because he had won the Occidente Trios Championship and the Mexican National Trios Championship with the other members of Nueva Generación Diniamita and the CMLL Arena Coliseo Tag Team Championship with his brother. In AAA, he has held the AAA World Tag Team Championship and AAA World Trios Championship with his brother and cousin. While he is the son of Cien Caras, he is not related to the wrestlers who used the names Cien Caras Jr. and El Hijo de Cien Caras.

== Personal life ==
Sansón was born in 1994 in Lagos de Moreno in the central Mexican state of Jalisco, son of professional wrestler Carmelo Reyes González, better known under the ring name Cien Caras ("100 Faces"). As Sansón is an enmascarado (or "masked professional wrestler"), his real name is not a matter of public record, a tradition in Mexican Lucha libre where masked wrestlers' private lives are concealed from the wrestling fanbase. His younger brother, known under the ring name El Cuatrero, was born two years later in 1996. His uncles Jesús (known as Máscara Año 2000) and Andrés (Universo 2000) were also professional wrestlers. Several second-generation Reyes family would later become wrestlers as well, including Forastero, Universo 2000 Jr. and Máscara Año 2000 Jr. At first, Carmelo Reyes did not want his sons to follow in his footsteps, hoping they would get a good education and steady jobs. He eventually agreed that his sons could practice lucha Libre with their uncle Andrés, but only as a hobby. During their training, Carmelo noticed how serious they took up their hobby and finally gave them his blessing to become professional wrestlers.

In lucha libre, there is a long history of wrestlers paying for the rights to use a ring name and be portrayed as a second or third-generation wrestler without actually being related, which can lead to some confusion around who are legitimately second or third-generation wrestlers. It has been confirmed that wrestlers Cien Caras Jr. and El Hijo de Cien Caras are not related to the Reyes family, while it is unclear if Hijo de Máscara Año 2000 is a blood relative or a fictional relative. Reyes later stated that he allowed the "Cien Caras" name to be rented by other wrestlers as his sons were very young at the time, and that he was unsure they would become professional wrestlers.

== Professional wrestling career ==
Both Sansón and El Cuatrero made their in-ring debut around 2010 and worked locally in Lagos de Moreno while continuing their education. He chose the ring name Sansón to honor his father, as Carmelo Reyes had originally worked under that ring name himself when he made his debut in 1974. During their time in Lagos de Moreno, the duo won their first Lucha de Apuestas (or "bet match"), defeating Los Centellas (I and II) and unmasking them.

=== Consejo Mundial de Lucha Libre (2014–2021) ===
In early 2014, the Reyes brothers started working in Guadalajara for the local Consejo Mundial de Lucha Libre (CMLL) promoters at Arena Coliseo, as well as training at the CMLL wrestling school under trainers Último Guerrero, Virus and Franco Colombo. They made their CMLL debut on March 25, 2014, teaming with their uncle Universo 2000 in a loss to the trio of Blue Panther, Sagrado and Valiente. While working in Guadalajara, on January 30, 2015, Cuatrero and Sansón competed in a tournament to determine the number one contenders for the local Occidente Tag Team Championship, but the two were eliminated by the team of Flash and Flash II. The brothers teamed up with Jocker for a trios tournament, with the winners being crowned the new Occidente Trios Champions. The team made it all the way to the final match of the tournament, but were defeated by Furia Roja, Mr. Trueno and Ray Trueno on March 5. On November 11, Cuatrero and Sansón teamed up with their cousin Forastero to win the Occidente Trios Championship.

Sansón's first match at Arena México, CMLL's main venue, took place on January 12, 2016, where he and his brother competed in the 2016 version of the La Copa Junior tournament. During the match, he eliminated Soberano Jr. before being eliminated by Esfinge. At that point, the Reyes brothers began being referred to as Nueva Generación Dinamita (Spanish for "New Generation Dynamite"), a reference to their heritage. Nueva Generación Dinamita worked their first major show for CMLL, Homenaje A Dos Leyendas ("Homage to Two Legends"), on March 18, defeating Soberano Jr. and Oro Jr. in the opening match. Both Sansón and El Cuatrero then participated in the annual Torneo Gran Alternativa ("Great Alternativa Tournament"), where younger wrestlers team up with established veteran wrestlers for a tag team tournament. Sansón was paired with El Terrible, but they lost to Pegasso and Máscara Dorada in the first round. On April 22, 2017, Sansón participated in his second La Copa Junior tournament, winning his qualifying block by lastly eliminating Blue Panther Jr. The following week, Sansón lost to Sobreano Jr., the only wrestler he eliminated the previous year. CMLL kept pairing Sansón and Sobreano Jr. opposite each other as they both progressed to the finals of the 2017 Gran Alternativa. On June 16, Soberano Jr. and Carístico defeated Sansón and Último Guerrero to win the tournament.

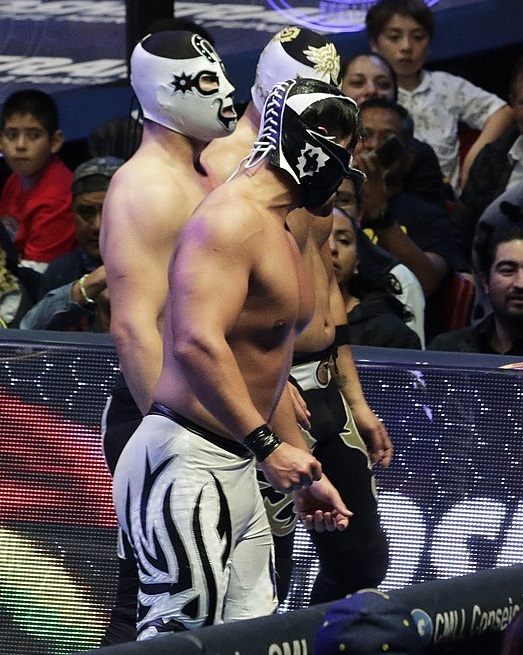
Sansón, alongside El Cuatrero (middle) and Forastero outside the ring in November 2018

On July 22, Sansón and El Cuatrero defeated Black Terry and Negro Navarro to win the CMLL Arena Coliseo Tag Team Championship, CMLL's second highest ranked tag team championship. Three days later, the trio defeated Los Hijos del Infierno (Ephesto, Luciferno and Mephisto) to win the Mexican National Trios Championship, making Sansón a triple champion. During the 2017 Leyenda de Plata tournament, Sansón gained a measure of revenge against rival Soberano Jr., eliminating him from the tournament before being eliminated himself. On November 3, during CMLL's 2017 Dia de Los Muertos celebrations, Sansón outlasted seven other wrestlers: El Cuatrero, Diamante Azul, Forastero, Hechicero, Valiente. Carístico and rival Soberano Jr., to win the Rey del Inframundo ("King of the Underworld") tournament. NGD eventually won CMLL's La Copa Dinastia, defeating the trios of Blue Panther, Blue Panther Jr., The Panther and Dragon Lee, Místico and Pierroth. On February 14, 2018, Nueva Generación Dinamita announced that they were relinquishing the CMLL Arena Coliseo Tag Team Championship, with the storyline given that they were focusing on winning the CMLL World Tag Team Championship. Subsequently, Sansón and Forastero entered the tournament for the vacant championship, but lost to Lee and Místico in the first round. At the CMLL 85th Anniversary Show on September 14, the Dinamitas defeated Atlantis, Soberano Jr. and Mistico as part of CMLL's most important show of the year.

As the holder of the CMLL World Middleweight Championship, on February 8, 2019, Sansón participated in the Universal Championship tournament, where all 16 participants held a championship recognized by CMLL; he lost to Volador Jr. in the opening round. For the 2019 Torneo Nacional de Parejas Increíbles ("National Incredible Teams Tournament"), where a rudo (the "bad guy") and a tecnico (the "Good guy") team up, Sansón was paired with long-time rival Soberano Jr. The odd couple defeated Tritón and Rey Bucanero in the first round before losing to eventual tournament winners Titán and Bárbaro Cavernario. As part of the 66th anniversary of Arena Puebla, NGD successfully defended the Mexican National Trios Championship against Los Ingobernables (El Terrible, La Bestia del Ring and Rush), in what was their tenth overall championship defense. At Sin Piedad on January 1, 2020, Sansón and Cuatrero unsuccessfully challenged Místico and Carístico for the CMLL World Tag Team Championship. On February 24, Sansón and El Cuatrero won the Torneo de parejas familiares ("Family Team Tournament") as they defeated the uncle/nephew team of Bucanero and Drone in the first round, the father/son team of Euforia and Soberano Jr. in the second round, and finally the Gran Guerrero/Último Guerrero brothers in the finals. On March 26, 2021, they defeated Los Guerreros Laguneros to win the CMLL World Trios Championship. On August 10, CMLL announced the departure of Nueva Generación Dinamita.

=== New Japan Pro-Wrestling (2018–2020) ===
In January 2018, Sansón made his Japanese debut as part of the New Japan Pro-Wrestling (NJPW) and CMLL co-promoted Fantastica Mania 2018 tour. During the sixth night of the tour on January 19, he unsuccessfully challenged Soberano Jr. for the Mexican National Welterweight Championship. In January 2019, the three members of Nueva Generación Dinamita participated in the Fantastica Mania 2019 tour, successfully defending the Mexican National Trios Championship against Ángel de Oro, Atlantis, and Titán on January 21, the tour's last day. During the Fantastica Mania 2020 tour, Sansón and his brother participated in the family tag team tournament, where they defeated Los Hermanos Chavez (Ángel de Oro and Niebla Roja) in the finals. On January 20, the final day of the tour, NGD successfully defended the Mexican National Trios Championship against Los Hermanos Chavez and Titán.

=== Lucha Libre AAA Worldwide (2021–present) ===
Nueva Generación Dinamita made their debut for Lucha Libre AAA Worldwide (AAA) on August 14, 2021, at Triplemanía XXIX, attacking Mr. Iguana, Aramís and Octagon Jr.. The trio entered a feud with El Poder del Norte (Tito Santana, Carta Brava Jr. and Mocho Cota Jr.), leading to a No Disqualification match at Héroes Inmortales XIV on October 9, which NGD won. At Triplemanía Regia II on December 4, they won a three-way match against El Poder del Norte and Los Vipers (Abismo Negro Jr., Arez and Psicosis) to become the number one contenders for the AAA World Trios Championship. On August 5, 2022, at Verano de Escándalo, Nueva Generación Dinamita defeated La Empresa (DMT Azul, Puma King and Sam Adonis) to win the titles. After El Cuatrero's attempted femicide and domestic violence case against Stephanie Vaquer in March 2023, Sansón and Forastero continued to hold the titles, with Hijo de Máscara Año 2000 replacing Cuatrero, until losing them to Los Vipers at Verano de Escándalo on July 21, 2023.

=== Independent circuit (2014–2019) ===
While working for CMLL, Sansón, like all their contracted wrestlers, was allowed to take independent circuit bookings on days he was not needed by CMLL. On February 19, 2017, Sansón and El Cuatrero unsuccessfully challenged Black Terry and Negro Navarro for the CMLL Arena Coliseo Tag Team Championship on a Lucha Memes show in Puebla. NGD also successfully defended the Mexican National Trios Championship against Los Kamikazes del Aire (Alas de Acero, Aramis, and Iron Kid) at a subsequent Lucha Memes show.

As part of CMLL's collaboration with The Crash Lucha Libre, Nueva Generación Dinamita has performed on several The Crash shows over the years. In their initial appearance for The Crash, Nueva Generación Dinamita lost to La Rebelión Amarilla (Bestia 666, Jacob Fatu and Mecha Wolf 450). The team returned to The Crash for their VII Anniversary Show on November 3, where they lost to Los Lucha Bros (Penta El 0M and The King) in a match for The Crash Tag Team Championship that also included Reno Scum (Adam Thornstowe and Luster the Legend). They returned to The Crash in December, losing to Bestia 666 and Garza Jr. in the main event. In 2019, Sansón and Cuatrero worked an extended storyline against Los Traumas (Trauma I and Trauma II) in The Crash. In June, Sansón was forced to team up with Trauma I to face Cuatrero and Trauma II in a relevos increíbles ("incredible pairs" match), where the regular partners refused to wrestle against each other. In the end, Sansón and Trauma I won after Trauma II hit El Cuatrero during the match. This was followed by a tag team match where NGD defeated Los Traumas by disqualification as part of their ongoing storyline.

On June 16, 2019, Sansón appeared at the International Wrestling Revolution Group (IWRG)'s annual Festival de las Máscaras show. The trio defeated their cousin Máscara Año 2000 Jr., teaming with Capo del Sur and Capo del Norte, who both use ring characters inspired by the original Los Dinamitas.

== Championships and accomplishments ==
- Consejo Mundial de Lucha Libre

- CMLL World Trios Championship (1 time) - with El Cuatrero and Forastero
- CMLL Arena Coliseo Tag Team Championship (1 time) – with El Cuatrero
- Mexican National Trios Championship (1 time) – with El Cuatrero and Forastero
- Occidente Trios Championship (1 time) – with El Cuatrero and Forastero
- La Copa Dinastia (2017) – with Sansón and Forastero
- Torneo de parejas familiares (2020) – with El Cuatrero
- El Rey del Inframundo (2017)

- Lucha Libre AAA Worldwide
  - AAA World Trios Championship (1 time) - with El Cuatrero and Forastero
  - AAA World Tag Team Championship (2 times) - with Forastero
- New Japan Pro-Wrestling
  - Torneo de Parejas Familiares (2020) – with El Cuatrero
- Pro Wrestling Illustrated
  - Ranked No. 200 of the top 500 singles wrestlers in the PWI 500 in 2021

== Luchas de Apuestas record ==
Winner (wager)	Loser (wager)	Location	Event	Date	Notes
El Cuatrero and Sansón (masks)	Los Centellas (I and II; Masks)	N/A	Live show	N/A	
