= CMLL 87th Anniversary Show =

2020 Consejo Mundial de Lucha Libre show

- Official poster depicting the defending champions
- Promotion: Consejo Mundial de Lucha Libre
- Date: September 25, 2020
- City: Mexico City, Mexico
- Venue: Arena México
- Tagline: Noche de Campeones (EN: Night of Champions)

Event chronology
| ← Previous; Homenaje a Dos Leyendas (Cancelled) | Next → Mexican National Women's Tag Team Championship tournament |

Consejo Mundial de Lucha Libre Anniversary Shows chronology
| ← Previous; 86th Anniversary | Next → 88th Anniversary |

The CMLL 87th Anniversary Show (Spanish: 87. Aniversario de CMLL) was a professional wrestling pay-per-view event, scripted and produced by the Mexican lucha libre wrestling company Consejo Mundial de Lucha Libre (CMLL; Spanish for "World Wrestling Council") that took place on September 25, 2020, in CMLL's home arena Arena México, Mexico City, Mexico. The event was also billed as "Night of Champions", where the fans decided the opponents of the defending champions at the event. No fans were in attendance at Arena México due to limitations from the COVID-19 pandemic, but the show was broadcast as an internet pay-per-view on Ticketmaster Live.

The show is normally the biggest show of the year for CMLL, considered their version of the Super Bowl or WrestleMania. This is the 93rd EMLL/CMLL Anniversary Show as there were two shows held in 1963, 1966, 1972, 1975, 1977, but none in 1985 (earthquake). The CMLL Anniversary Show series is the longest-running annual professional wrestling show, starting in 1934.

== Production ==
=== Background ===
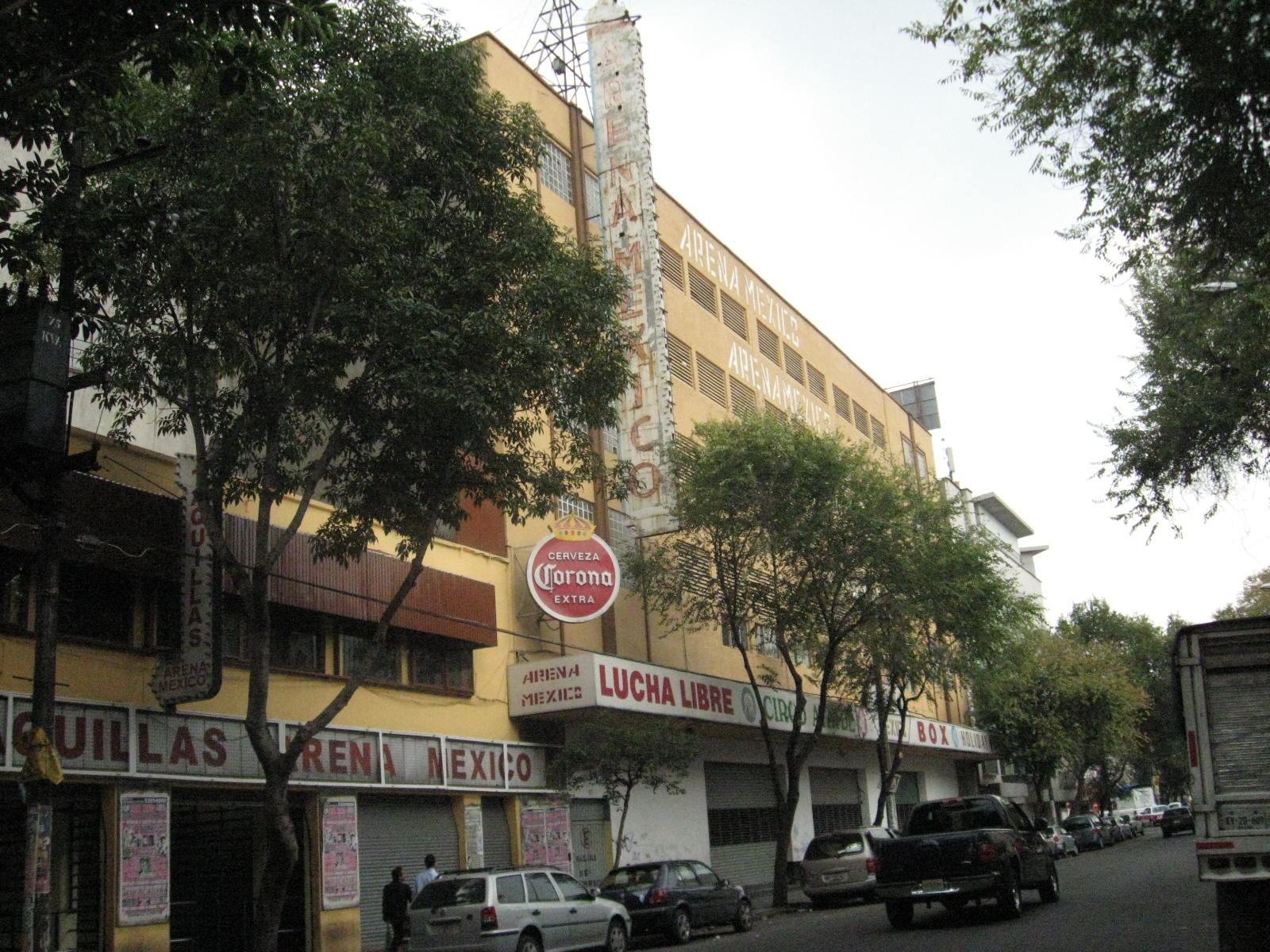
Arena México, CMLL's main venue and location of the 87th Anniversary Show

The Mexican Lucha libre (professional wrestling) company Consejo Mundial de Lucha Libre (CMLL) started out under the name Empresa Mexicana de Lucha Libre ("Mexican Wrestling Company"; EMLL), founded by Salvador Lutteroth in 1933. Lutteroth, inspired by professional wrestling shows he had attended in Texas, decided to become a wrestling promoter and held his first show on September 21, 1933, marking what would be the beginning of organized professional wrestling in Mexico. Lutteroth would later become known as "the father of Lucha Libre" . A year later EMLL held the EMLL 1st Anniversary Show, starting the annual tradition of the Consejo Mundial de Lucha Libre Anniversary Shows that have been held each year ever since, most commonly in September.

Over the years the anniversary show would become the biggest show of the year for CMLL, akin to the Super Bowl for the National Football League (NFL) or WWE's WrestleMania event. The first anniversary show was held in Arena Modelo, which Lutteroth had bought after starting EMLL. In 1942–43 Lutteroth financed the construction of Arena Coliseo, which opened in April 1943. The EMLL 10th Anniversary Show was the first of the anniversary shows to be held in Arena Coliseo. In 1956 Lutteroth had Arena México built in the location of the original Arena Modelo, making Arena México the main venue of EMLL from that point on. Starting with the EMLL 23rd Anniversary Show, all anniversary shows except for the EMLL 46th Anniversary Show have been held in the arena that would become known as "The Cathedral of Lucha Libre". On occasion EMLL held more than one show labeled as their "Anniversary" show, such as two 33rd Anniversary Shows in 1966. Over time the anniversary show series became the oldest, longest-running annual professional wrestling show. In comparison, WWE's WrestleMania is only the fourth oldest still promoted show (CMLL's Arena Coliseo Anniversary Show and Arena México anniversary shows being second and third). EMLL was supposed to hold the EMLL 52nd Anniversary Show on September 20, 1985, but Mexico City was hit by a magnitude 8.0 earthquake. EMLL canceled the event both because of the general devastation but also over fears that Arena México might not be structurally sound after the earthquake.

When Jim Crockett Promotions was bought by Ted Turner in 1988 EMLL became the oldest still active promotion in the world. In 1991 EMLL was rebranded as "Consejo Mundial de Lucha Libre" and thus held the CMLL 59th Anniversary Show, the first under the new name, on September 18, 1992. Traditionally CMLL holds their major events on Friday Nights, replacing their regularly scheduled Super Viernes show.

CMLL stopped promoting shows in March 2020 due to guidelines issued by the Mexican government due to the COVID-19 pandemic. This meant that CMLL did not hold any shows between March 14 and July 30, 2020. CMLL later announced that they would return to promoting their CMLL Super Viernes shows every Friday, starting on September 4. The September 4th, 11th and 19th Super Viernes shows would be empty arena matches, broadcast as internet Pay-Per-View (iPPV) events on Ticketmaster Live, followed by the 87th Anniversary show, held on September 25 as an empty arena iPPV. CMLL announced that the show would be a "Night of Champions" show where fans could vote on who they would want to challenge for various CMLL championships.

=== Storylines ===
The 87th Anniversary Show will feature seven professional wrestling matches scripted by CMLL with some wrestlers involved in scripted feuds. The wrestlers portray either heels (referred to as rudos in Mexico, those that play the part of the "bad guys") or faces (técnicos in Mexico, the "good guy" characters) as they perform. For the 87th Anniversary Show, CMLL announced that they would let the fans vote for who would challenge reigning CMLL champions at the "Night of Champions" themed show. CMLL also announced that the total number of votes for each match would determine the order of matches on the show, with the highest vote getting earning the main event sport regardless of their normal card position. The championships chosen for the polls were:

CMLL Championships

| Championship | Current champion(s) | Date won | Defenses | Ref(s). |
|---|---|---|---|---|
| CMLL World Micro-Estrellas Championship | Chamuel | December 25, 2019 | 0 | |
| CMLL World Tag Team Championship | La Alianza de Plata y Oro (Carístico and Místico) | November 1, 2019 | 0 | |
| CMLL World Trios Championship | Los Guerreros Lagunero (Euforia, Gran Guerrero and Último Guerrero) | September 28, 2018 | 3 | |
| CMLL World Women's Championship | Marcela | March 11, 2016 | 5 | |
| NWA World Historic Welterweight Championship | Volador Jr. | August 4, 2018 | 3 | |
| Mexican National Trios Championship | Nuevo Generacion Dinamitas (El Cuatrero, Forastero and Sansón) | July 25, 2017 | 14 | |
| Mexican National Women's Championship | La Metálica | December 29, 2018 | 2 | |

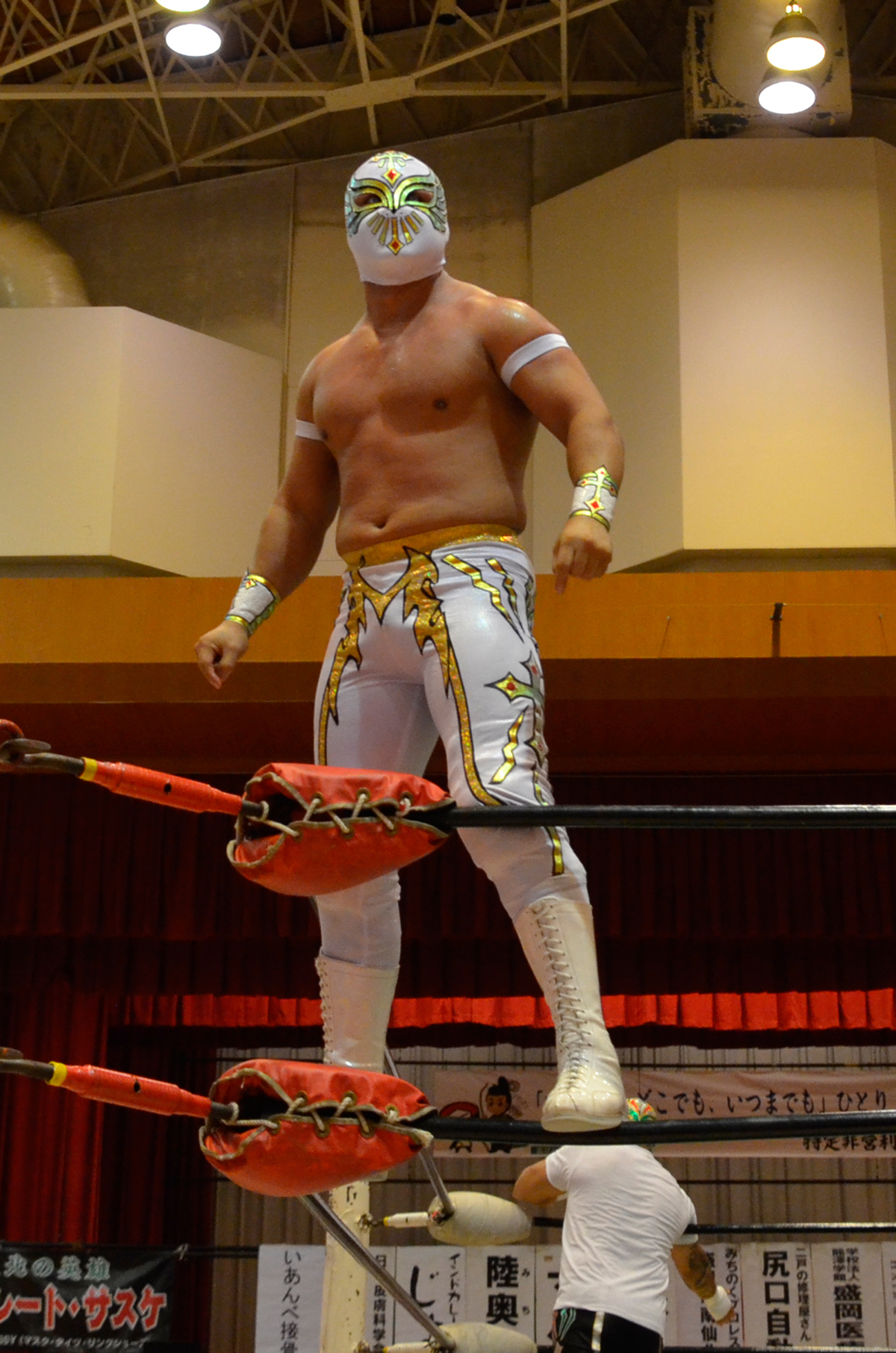
Carístico, who along with Místico defended the CMLL World Tag Team Championship in the main event.

When the votes were tabulated the total votes defined the match order as:

1. CMLL World Micro-Estrellas Championship match - 34,049 votes
2. CMLL World Trio Championship match - 34,989 votes
3. NWA World Historic Welterweight Championship match - 35,037 votes
4. CMLL World Women's Championship match - 35,525 votes
5. Mexican National Women's Championship match - 36,581 votes
6. Mexican National Trios Championship match - 36,196 votes
7. CMLL World Tag Team Championship match - 37,251 votes

CMLL World Micro-Estrellas Championship poll

1. Microman - 45.06%
2. El Gallito - 34.91%
3. El Guapito - 20.03%

CMLL World Trio Championship poll

1. Hechicero, El Terrible, and Templario - 64.55% (22,606 votes)
2. Los Hijos del Infierno (Ephesto, Luciferno and Mephisto) - 23.03% (8,044 votes)
3. Audaz, Star Jr., and Titán - 12.43% (4,339 votes)

NWA World Historic Welterweight Championship poll

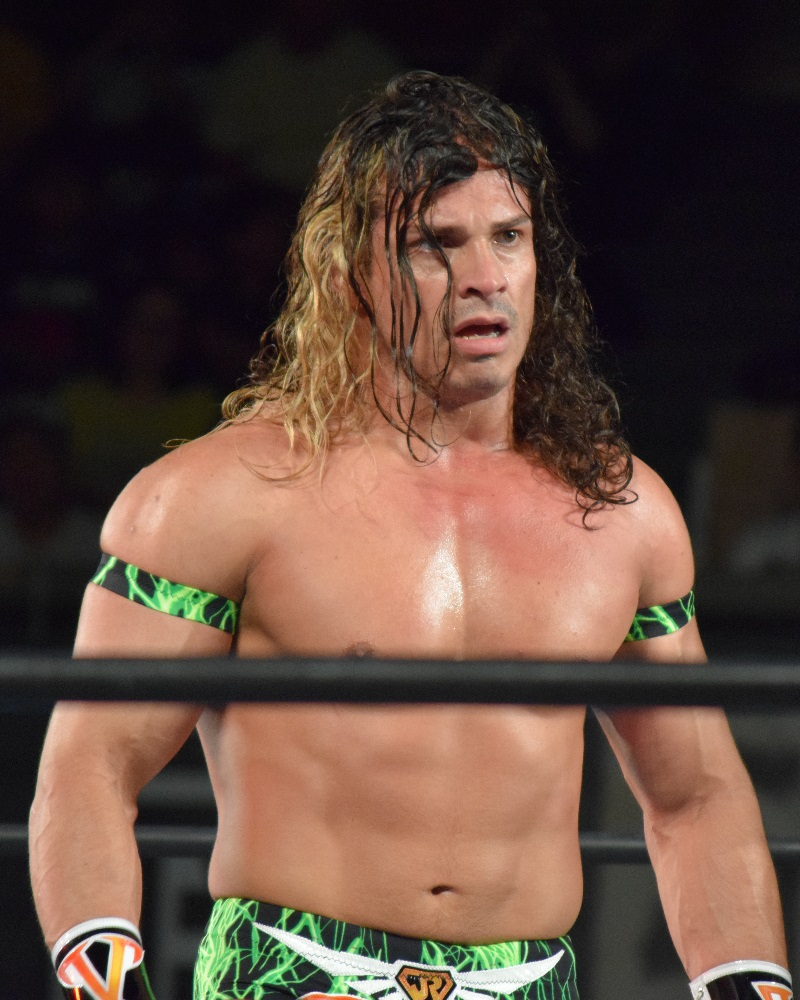
NWA World Historic Welterweight Champion Volador Jr.

1. Bandido - 66.76% (23,397 votes)
2. Templario - 21.60% (7,555 votes)
3. Soberano Jr. - 11.64% (4,085 votes)

CMLL World Women's Championship poll

1. Princesa Sugehit - 44.64% (15,892 votes)
2. Dalys - 37.74% (13,403 votes)
3. La Amapola - 17.62% (6,230 votes)

Mexican National Women's Championship poll

1. Lluvia - 36.32% (12,235 votes)
2. Reyna Isis - 31.23% (11,445 votes)
3. La Jarocita - 18.59% (6,805 votes)
4. Estrellita - 13.95% (5,096 votes)

Mexican National Trios Championship poll

1. Los Cancerberos del Infierno (Cancerbero, Raziel, and Virus) - 39.14% (14,222 votes)
2. Negro Casas, El Felino, and Tiger- 27.44% (9,922 votes)
3. Blue Panther, Blue Panther Jr., and Black Panther- 17.92% (6,462 votes)
4. El Valiente, Guerrero Maya Jr., and Esfinge - 15.50% (5,590 votes)

CMLL World Tag Team Championship poll

1. Rey Cometa and Espíritu Negro - 52.23% (19,522 votes)
2. Diamante Azul and Stuka Jr. - 21.68% (8,047 votes)
3. Ángel de Oro and Niebla Roja - 16.01% (5,938 votes)
4. Atlantis Jr. and Flyer- 10.08% (3,744 votes)

The team of Cavernario, El Terrible, and Hechicero was originally announced as one of the fan poll options for the CMLL World Trios Championship, but Cavernario suffered a knee injury during the main event of the September 4 Super Viernes show and needed surgery as a result. CMLL held a fan poll to determine a replacement for Caverario, necessitated by the team leading the overall poll. Voters chose Templario over Vangelis or Dark Magic, to replace Cavernario. Templario was also listed in the polls for the NWA World Historic Welterweight Championship but was far behind the top vote-getter. In the end the team of Templario, El Terrible, and Hechicero won the vote, with enough votes to have them work the second match of the night.

The right to challenge for the CMLL World Women's Championship was originally won by Princesa Sugehit, but on September 16 Sugehit announced that she had tested positive for COVID-19 and thus was forced to isolate and could not compete in the anniversary show. CMLL opted to have the second-highest vote winner, Dalys, challenge for the title instead, while Pricesa Sugehit was promised a championship match in October once she was out of quarantine.

La Metálica's challenger was a choice between Lluvia, Reyna Isis, La Jarocita, and La Estrellita. The fan vote selected Lluvia to wrestle for the Mexican National Women's Championship. On September 21 it was revealed that Lluvia had tested positive for COVID-19, albeit asymptomatic, and thus was not able to compete. In her place, Reyna Isis was given the match due to her position as the first runner-up in the fan vote. It was announced that Lluvia would get her championship match at a later date after her quarantine was over.

On September 23, CMLL announced that both Bandido and Último Guerrero had both tested positive for COVID-19 and were off the show. As the runner up in the NWA World Historic Welterweight Championship Templario was announced as Bandido's replacement. As Guerrero was taken off the show, CMLL replaced the CMLL World Trios Championship match with a match for the CMLL World Welterweight Championship, with Titán defending against the reigning Mexican National Welterweight Champion Soberano Jr. Both championship matches were announced as taking place at some point in October.

== Results ==
| No. | Results | Stipulations | Times |
|---|---|---|---|
| 1 | Chamuel (c) defeated Microman | Singles match for the CMLL World Micro-Estrellas Championship | 13:14 |
| 2 | Titán (c) defeated Soberano Jr. | Singles match for the CMLL World Welterweight Championship | 25:24 |
| 3 | Reyna Isis defeated La Metálica (c) | Singles match for the Mexican National Women's Championship | 17:19 |
| 4 | Nueva Generación Dinamita (El Cuatrero, Forastero and Sansón) (c) defeated Los Cancerberos del Infierno (Virus, Raziel and Cancerbero) | Six team match for the Mexican National Trios Championship | 17:07 |
| 5 | Marcela (c) defeated Dalys by disqualification | Singles match for the CMLL World Women's Championship | 14:45 |
| 6 | Volador Jr. (c) defeated Templario | Singles match for the NWA World Historic Welterweight Championship | 19:35 |
| 7 | La Alianza de Plata y Oro (Carístico and Místico) (c) defeated AtrapaSueños (Rey Cometa and Espíritu Negro) | Tag team match for the CMLL World Tag Team Championship | 13:22 |
(c) / – the champion(s) heading into the match
