= Homenaje a Dos Leyendas (2021) =

2021 professional wrestling show

- Original promotional poster featuring Salvador Lutteroth, Sangre Chicana, Bárbaro Cavernario and El Felino
- Promotion: Consejo Mundial de Lucha Libre
- Date: September 17, 2021
- City: Mexico City, Mexico
- Venue: Arena México

Pay-per-view chronology
← Previous; Mexican National Tag Team Championship tournament	Next → CMLL 88th Anniversary Show

Homenaje a Dos Leyendas chronology
← Previous; 2019	Next → —

Homenaje a Dos Leyendas (2021) (Spanish for "Homage to Two Legends") was a professional wrestling supercard event, produced and scripted by Consejo Mundial de Lucha Libre (CMLL; Spanish for "World Wrestling Council"), that took place on September 17, 2021. It was originally scheduled to take place on March 20, 2020, but on March 14, CMLL announced that due to guidelines issued by the Mexican government, the Homenaje a Dos Leyendas show would be postponed to a future date. The show, like all of CMLL's major shows took place in Arena México, Mexico City, Mexico, CMLL's home venue. The event was to honor and remember CMLL founder Salvador Lutteroth, who died in March 1987. Starting in 1999, CMLL honored not just their founder during the show, but also a second lucha libre legend, making it their version of a Hall of Fame event. For the 2021 show, CMLL commemorated the life and career of wrestler Sangre Chicana. Due to the COVID-19 pandemic, this was the first show to be held in September; it is the 22nd show under the Homenaje a Dos Leyendas name, having previously been known as Homenaje a Salvador Lutteroth from 1996 to 1998.

The main event of the show was a Lucha de Apuestas ("Bet match") which saw Bárbaro Cavernario defeat his former La Peste Negra stablemate El Felino, resulting in Felino being shaved bald per lucha libre traditions. In the semi-main event, Volador Jr. defeated Gran Guerrero in the final of the Copa Independencia.

== Production ==
=== Background ===
Since 1996, the Mexican wrestling company Consejo Mundial de Lucha Libre (Spanish for "World Wrestling Council"; CMLL) has held a show in March each year to commemorate the passing of CMLL founder Salvador Lutteroth who died in March 1987. For the first three years the show paid homage to Lutteroth himself, from 1999 through 2004 the show paid homage to Lutteroth and El Santo, Mexico's most famous wrestler ever and from 2005 forward the show has paid homage to Lutteroth and a different leyenda ("Legend") each year, celebrating the career and accomplishments of past CMLL stars. Originally billed as Homenaje a Salvador Lutteroth, it has been held under the Homenaje a Dos Leyendas ("Homage to two legends") since 1999 and is the only show outside of CMLL's Anniversary shows that CMLL has presented every year since its inception. All Homenaje a Dos Leyendas shows have been held in Arena México in Mexico City, Mexico, which is CMLL's main venue, its "home". Traditionally CMLL holds their major events on Friday Nights, which means the Homenaje a Dos Leyendas shows replace their regularly scheduled Super Viernes show. The 2020 show will be the 26th overall a Homenaje a Dos Leyendas show produced by CMLL.

=== Storylines ===
The Homenaje a Dos Leyendas show will feature six professional wrestling matches with different wrestlers involved in pre-existing scripted feuds, plots and storylines. Wrestlers were portrayed as either heels (referred to as rudos in Mexico, those that portray the "bad guys") or faces (técnicos in Mexico, the "good guy" characters) as they followed a series of tension-building events, which culminated in a wrestling match or series of matches.

The La Peste Negra ("The Black Plague") was founded in 2008 by Mr. Niebla, Negro Casas and Heavy Metal, with El Felino replacing Heavy Metal later that year. In early 2014 Mr. Niebla made Bárbaro Cavernario and Herodes Jr. members of the team as well, with Herodes Jr. leaving the group not long after. On December 23, 2019, Mr. Niebla died, leading to CMLL holding La Noche de Mr. Niebla ("Mr. Niebla night") on January 24, 2020 in his honor. The main event was a Relevos increíbles six-man tag team match where El Felino and Bárbaro Cavernario were booked on opposite teams. In the lead up to the show, Mexican sports newspaper Ovaciones mentioned a feud between Felino and Cavernario, a storyline that had not been pushed up until that point, in fact El Felino had been working a storyline feud with Ángel de Oro prior. During the Noche de Mr. Niebla show, both wrestlers would be involved in several confrontations, with Cavernario cheating to win the final fall against his stablemate. After the show Cavernario stated that there would be no La Peste Negra without Mr. Niebla, while Felino was hoping that the group would continue. On the following week's Super Viernes show, the two were on opposite sides in the main event again, this time Cavernario pretended that El Felino had hit him with an illegal low blow so that the referee would disqualify El Felino's team. A week later the two rivals met in a best two-out-of-three falls match, which ended in Cavernario being disqualified for failing to release his hold when instructed to do so by the referee. Following the match, the third Peste Negra member, Negro Casas, came to the ring and sided with El Felino. Challenges for a Lucha de Apuestas, or hair vs. hair match, followed. Days after the challenges were laid out, the two met with CMLL officials to sign the contract for their Lucha de Apuestas match for the main event of the 2020 Homenaje a Dos Leyendas show. Cavernaro was teamed up with Volador Jr. for the 2020 Torneo Nacional de Parejas Increíbles and qualified for the finals of the tournament. During the third and deciding fall of the finals, against Carístico and Forastero, Felino came to ringside and distracted Cavernerio enough that he was pinned and his team lost the match. The March 13 Super Viernes show was originally scheduled to be the last Friday show before Homenaje a Dos Leyendas, and saw El Felino, Negro Casas, and Volador Jr. defeat Cavernario, Carístico, and Diamante Azul in two straight falls, as El Felino pinned Cavernario for both falls.

The Los Guerreros Lagunero (Spanish for "The Warrior of the Lagoon") trio of Euforia, Gran Guerrero, and Último Guerrero won the CMLL World Trios Championship from The Cl4n (Ciber the Main Man, The Chris and Sharlie Rockstar) on September 14, 2018. In the 18 months between their championship victory and the Homenaje a Dos Leyendas show, Los Guerreros successfully defended the trios championship a total of three times. First against Carístico, Místico, and Volador Jr. on November 30, 2018; then against Carístico, Dragon Lee, and Volador Jr. on March 15, 2019 and finally against Carístico, Soberano Jr., and Stuka Jr. on May 28. During the Homenaje a Dos Leyendas press conference, CMLL announced that Los Guerreros would make their fourth championship defense against the team of Carístico, Valiente, and Volador Jr.

From 1999 until 2001, CMLL promoted a number of shows and championships in Japan under the name "CMLL Japan". One such championship was the CMLL Japan Women's Championship, which was active until June 2001 when then champion Chikako Shiratori retired. Following the end of CMLL Japan, CMLL partnered with various all-female promotions in Japan, sending CMLL representatives to Japan and hosting Japanese wrestlers in Mexico. During that time CMLL recognized the CMLL-Reina International Championship, and the CMLL-Reina International Junior Championship, promoted by their Japanese partners Universal Woman's Pro Wrestling Reina and later on Reina X World/Reina Joshi Puroresu until the promotion disbanded. In early 2020, CMLL co-promoted a series of all-female show in Japan partnering with the Japanese Lady's Ring wrestling magazine. On the second CMLL Lady's Ring show Dalys la Caribeña defeated Mina Shirakawa to win the newly created CMLL-Lady's Ring Women's Championship, later referred to as the CMLL Japan Women's Championship. During the February 13 Homenaje a Dos Leyendas press conference, CMLL announced that Dalys would make her first championship defense against Princesa Sugehit on the show.

=== Homage to Salvador Lutteroth and Sangre Chicana ===
In September 1933, Salvador Lutteroth founded Empresa Mexicana de Lucha Libre (EMLL), which would later be renamed Consejo Mundial de Lucha Libre. Over time Lutteroth would become responsible for building both Arena Coliseo in Mexico City and Arena Mexico, which became known as "The Cathedral of Lucha Libre". Over time EMLL became the oldest wrestling promotion in the world, with 2018 marking the 85th year of its existence. Lutteroth has often been credited with being the "father of Lucha Libre", introducing the concept of masked wrestlers to Mexico as well as the Luchas de Apuestas match. Lutteroth died on September 5, 1987. EMLL, later CMLL, remained under the ownership and control of the Lutteroth family as first Salvador's son Chavo Lutteroth and later his grandson Paco Alonso took over ownership of the company.

The life and achievements of Salvador Lutteroth is always honored at the annual Homenaje a Dos Leyendas show and since 1999 CMLL has also honored a second person, a Leyenda of lucha libre, in some ways CMLL's version of their Hall of Fame. For the 2021 show, CMLL will honor the life and career of Andrés Durán Reyes, better known under the ring name Sangre Chicana (Spanish for "Chicano Blood"). Reyes worked as a professional wrestler from 1973 until 2019 where he retired for health reasons. He had a reputation for wild, blood soaked brawls against longtime rivals such as Fishman, El Cobarde, El Faraón, El Satánico and Perro Aguayo. During his career he won several championships, including the NWA World Middleweight Championship twice, CMLL World Trios Championship, Mexican National Middleweight Championship, Mexican National Tag Team Championship, Mexican National Light Heavyweight Championship, AAA Americas Heavyweight Championship, and UWA World Light Heavyweight Championship amongst others.

=== Change of card ===
Aside from the hair vs. hair match, the matches on the card were either rescheduled or thrown out.

The Micro-Estrellas match between Átomo, El Gallito, Microman and Chamuel, Guapito and Zacarías el Perico took place in June 2021, with Átomo and Guapito switching sides. It ended in a win for Gallito, Guapito and Microman.

The match between Diamante Azul, Stuka Jr., Titán and Mephisto, Negro Casas, and El Terrible did not take place. Although five of the six men are still contracted to CMLL, El Terrible became involved in a new storyline as the leader of the reformed Los Ingobernables, and in May 2021, Azul had left CMLL to join Lucha Libre AAA Worldwide (AAA).

The match between Ángel de Oro, Flip Gordon, Niebla Roja and Nueva Generacion Dinamita (El Cuatrero, Forastero and Sansón) did not take place. By the time the rescheduled show was about to happen, Gordon was unable to enter Mexico due to travel restrictions, Ángel de Oro and Niebla Roja turned rudo in March 2021 and in August, Nueva Generacion Dinamita left CMLL to join AAA.

In Dalys la Caribeña's first defense of the CMLL-Lady's Ring Japan Women's Championship, she defeated Princesa Sugehit in a best two-out-of-three falls match taped sometime before it was broadcast on June 26, 2021. Dalys would be involved in the 2021 Homenaje a Dos Leyendas show, teaming with La Jarochita and Lluvia in a best two-out-of-three falls match against Marcela, Stephanie Vaquer and Dark Silueta.

The trios match between El Sky Team (Carístico, Valiente and Volador Jr.) and Los Guerreros Laguneros (Euforia, Gran Guerrero and Último Guerrero) for the CMLL World Trios Championship did not take place. El Sky Team did not receive their title shot again while Los Guerreros Laguneros were champions, but did receive a title shot in June 2021 from Nueva Generacion Dinamita, who defeated the Guerreros earlier that March. However, Nueva Generacion Dinamita vacated the title in April, so El Sky Team's title shot could be seen as unofficial. Volador Jr. and Gran Guerrero would be involved in the 2021 Homenaje a Dos Leyendas show, as they both advanced to the Copa Independencia final, by winning a twelve man elimination match on the Super Viernes shows.

== Results ==
No.	Results	Stipulations	Times
1	Los Depredadores (Diamond, Magia Blanca and Magnus) defeated Disturbio, El Coyote and Sangre Imperial	Six-man "Lucha Libre rules" tag team match	12:27
2	Dark Silueta, Marcela and Stephanie Vaquer defeated Dalys la Caribeña, La Jarochita and Lluvia	Six-woman "Lucha Libre rules" tag team match	12:05
3	Euforia, Hechicero and Místico defeated Atlantis Jr., Negro Casas and Último Guerrero by disqualification	Six-man "Lucha Libre rules" tag team match	19:10
4	Volador Jr. defeated Gran Guerrero	Copa Independencia final	19:05
5	Bárbaro Cavernario defeated El Felino	Best two-out-of-three falls Lucha de Apuestas, hair vs. hair match	10:49
