= La Noche de Mr. Niebla =

Professional wrestling show

- Official poster for the event
- Promotion: Consejo Mundial de Lucha Libre
- Date: January 24, 2020
- City: Mexico City, Mexico
- Venue: Arena México

Pay-per-view chronology
← Previous; Reyes del Aire	Next → Torneo Nacional de Parejas Increíbles

La Noche de Mr. Niebla (Spanish for "Mr. Niebla Night") was a major professional wrestling supercard show, produced and scripted by the Mexican Lucha Libre promotion Consejo Mundial de Lucha Libre (CMLL). The Sin Piedad show took place on January 24, 2020, in Arena México, Mexico City, Mexico, CMLL's main venue. The event was in homage of Mr. Niebla, a long time CMLL wrestler who died on December 23, 2019. It was the last CMLL event held before the start of the COVID-19 pandemic, which began in mid-March 2020.

The main event featured the storyline break up of La Peste Negra, a group Mr. Niebla help found, as Bárbaro Cavernario and El Felino attacked each other repeatedly during the Relevos increíbles six-man tag team match that saw Felino and his partners Último Guerrero, and Diamante Azul defeat Cavernario, Carístico, and Valiente by disqualification due to a foul from Cavernaro on El Felino.

== Production ==
=== Background ===
Professional wrestler Efrén Tiburcio Márquez, commonly known under the ring name Mr. Niebla, died on December 23, 2019, from complications of a blood infection after dealing with health issues for several months leading up to his death. Prior to his death, CMLL had announced that they were holding a benefit show for Mr. Niebla on January 4 to help pay for his latest medical expenses, but with Mr. Niebla's passing it became a tribute show, El Ultimo Vuelo del Rey del Guaguanco ("The last dance of the King of Guaguanco"), with the money collected going to his family. The show was held at Deportivo Pavón in Mexico City and was streamed on +LuchaTV's YouTube channel.

No.	Results	Stipulations
1	Bluesman and Mini Tigre Blanco defeated Blazer and Dazael	Best two-out-of-three falls tag team match
2	Full Metal, Látigo Negro, and Príncipe Odín Jr. defeated Caballero Dragón, Rey Sicario, and Yoruba	Best two-out-of-three falls six-man tag team match
3	Drone defeated Súper Astro Jr., Star Jr., Sonic, Leono, Bengala, Templario, El Hijo del Signo, Tiger, Akuma, Sagrado, El Coyote, Demonio Infernal, and Tackle	Copa Mr. Niebla torneo cibernetico elimination match
4	Perico Zacarías defeated Microman	Singles match
5	Kráneo, Retro, Stuka Jr., and Volcano defeated Guerrero Maya Jr., Nitro, Olímpico, and Tyson La Bestia	Best two-out-of-three falls six-man tag team match
6	Ángel de Oro, Atlantis Jr., Niebla Roja, and Shocker defeated El Felino, Gran Guerrero, Mephisto, and Rey Bucanero	Best two-out-of-three falls six-man tag team match

=== Storylines ===
The event featured six professional wrestling matches with different wrestlers involved in pre-existing scripted feuds, plots and storylines. Wrestlers were portrayed as either heels (referred to as rudos in Mexico, those that portray the "bad guys") or faces (técnicos in Mexico, the "good guy" characters) as they followed a series of tension-building events, which culminated in a wrestling match or series of matches.

While the January 4 show was a benefit show for Mr. Niebla's family, CMLL later announced that they would hold a Friday night tribute show to Mr. Niebla on January 24, 2020. CMLL announced that Olímpico, Rey Bucanero, and Shocker would all wear their masks for one night, after having previously lost them in a Lucha de Apuestas (bet match). Shocker had in fact lost his mask to Mr. Niebla in 1999. For the main event, CMLL booked La Peste Negra team members El Felino and Bárbaro Cavernario on opposite teams in a Relevos increíbles six-man tag team match between members of Mr. Niebla's stable.

== Aftermath ==
The developing feud between Felino and Bárbaro Cavernario led to the dissolution of La Peste Negra as well as the two being booked in the main event of the 2020 Homenaje a Dos Leyenas show, with both men risking their hair in a Lucha de Apuestas match.

== Results ==
No.	Results	Stipulations	Times
1	La Ola Negra (Akuma and Espanto Jr.) defeated Halcón Suriano Jr. and Magia Blanca	Best two-out-of-three falls team match	11:39
2	Drone, Fuego and Guerrero Maya Jr. defeated Olímpico, Tiger, and Virus	Best two-out-of-three falls six-man tag team match	11:56
3	Soberano Jr., Star Jr., and Titán defeated Rey Bucanero, Shocker, and El Terrible	Best two-out-of-three falls six-man tag team match	11:47
4	Nueva Generacion Dinamitas (Sansón, El Cuatrero, and Forastero) defeated Ángel de Oro, Niebla Roja, and Stuka Jr.	Best two-out-of-three falls six-man tag team match	—
5	Místico defeated Gran Guerrero by disqualification	Best two-out-of-three falls match	—
6	El Felino, Último Guerrero, and Diamante Azul defeated Carístico, Bárbaro Cavernario and Valiente by disqualification	Relevos increíbles six-man tag team match	—

== See also ==
- 2020 in professional wrestling
