= Micro Gemelo Diablo I =

Mexican professional wrestler

Professional wrestling career
- Ring name: Micro Gemelo Diablo I

Micro Gemelo Diablo I is the ring name of a Mexican professional wrestler. He previously competed for the Mexican Consejo Mundial de Lucha Libre (CMLL) wrestling promotion, where he was one of the competitors in CMLL's Micro-Estrella ("Micro-Star") division where he competed with and against other wrestlers with dwarfism. He performs alongside Micro Gemelo Diablo II as part of the tag team Los Micro Gemelos Diablo. Prior to their departures from CMLL, both Micro Gemelos Diablo were also two-thirds of the trio Los Micro Malditos alongside Micro Sagrado. Micro Gemelo Diablo I was the second holder of the CMLL World Micro-Estrellas Championship. His real name is not a matter of public record, as is often the case with masked wrestlers in Mexico where their private lives are kept a secret from the professional wrestling fans.

He began his career on December 3, 2021, fighting at a CMLL trios match.

== Professional wrestling career ==
On October 30, 2022, Micro Gemelo Diablo I defeated Chamuel for the CMLL World Micro-Estrellas Championship.

Los Micro Gemelos Diablo were originally intended to portray a new version of KeMonito (taking turns in the suit), but legal issues with the original KeMonito waylaid those plans & resulted in the pushing of a less experienced luchador. Frustrations over the situation caused the team to leave CMLL and appear at Lucha Libre AAA Worldwide's Triplemanía XXXII.

== Championships and accomplishments ==
- Consejo Mundial de Lucha Libre
  - CMLL World Micro-Estrellas Championship (1 time)
