= CMLL Universal Amazons Championship (2019) =

2019 Mexican professional wrestling tournament

- Poster for the August 16 tournament final show
- Promotion: Consejo Mundial de Lucha Libre
- Date: August 2, 2019; August 9, 2019; August 16, 2019
- City: Mexico City, Mexico
- Venue: Arena México

Event chronology
← Previous; Jushin Thunder Liger Mexican Retirement Show	Next → International Gran Prix

CMLL Universal Championship tournaments chronology
← Previous; 2019 (male)	Next → —

The CMLL Universal Amazons Championship (2019) (Spanish: Campeonato Universal de Amazonas) is a professional wrestling tournament produced and scripted by Consejo Mundial de Lucha Libre (CMLL; "World Wrestling Council"). The tournament started on August 2, 2019, and ran for three Super Viernes shows with the final held on August 14, 2019, at Arena México in Mexico City, Mexico.

2019 marked the first year that CMLL held a women's version of their annual Universal Championship tournament, with the intention to make the Universal Amazons Championship an annual event as well. In the finals Dalys la Caribeña defeated La Metálica to win the tournament, as well as a championship match for the CMLL World Women's Championship at the CMLL 86th Anniversary Show. The winner of the tournament was presented with a championship belt instead of a trophy, to match the Universal Championship tournament winners.

== Tournament background ==
In 2009 the Mexican professional wrestling promotion Consejo Mundial de Lucha Libre (CMLL) held their first ever Universal Championship tournament featuring 16 champions from the promotion's male division. The tournament became an annually recurring tournament from that point on.

During the summer of 2019 CMLL announced that they were introducing a "Universal Amazons Championship" tournament as well, with the idea of it being an annual tournament for the women's division. Like the male counterpart, the winner of the Universal Amazons Championship is given a belt as a trophy, identical to the male belt but with a green leather strap instead of a red. At the time of the first tournament, CMLL only promoted two championships for the women's division, so CMLL was unable to hold an "all champions" tournament, instead opting to give the winner a match for the CMLL World Women's Championship at a later date. The winner would also serve as the flag bearer for Team Mexico at the 2019 International Gran Prix.

== Tournament participants ==
Block A

- La Amapola
- Avispa Dorada
- La Guerrera
- La Infernal
- La Maligna
- La Metálica (Mexican National Women's Champion)
- Marcela (CMLL World Women's Champion)
- Sanely
- La Seductora
- Tiffany

Block B

- La Comandante
- Dalys la Caribeña
- La Jarochita
- Lluvia
- La Magnifica
- Mystique
- Silueta
- Skadi
- Reyna Isis
- Stephanie Vaquer

== Tournament ==
The first block of the Universal Amazons Championship took place on August 2, 2019, as part of CMLL's Friday night Super Viernes show.

Block A torneo cibernetico

#	Eliminated	Eliminated by	Time
1	La Infernal	La Amapola	07:26
2	La Guerrera	La Seductora	09:54
3	La Maligna	Sanely	12:48
4	La Seductora	Marcela	14:32
5	Sanely	Tiffany	15:50
6	La Amapola	Tiffany (double pin)	18:49
7	Tiffany	La Amapola (double pin)	18:49
8	Avispa Dorada	Marcela	20:04
9	Marcela	La Metálica	21:42
10	Winner	La Metálica	21:42

The second block of the tournament took place on August 11, 2019.

Block B torneo cibernetico

#	Eliminated	Eliminated by	Time
1	La Comandante	Skadi	09:38
2	Stephanie Vaquer	La Jarochita	11:17
3	Mystique	La Magnifica	13:32
4	Skadi	Lluvia	15:52
5	Silueta	Reyna Isis	19:03
6	La Magnifica	La Jarochita	19:55
7	Lluvia	Dalys la Caribeña	21:13
8	Reyna Isis	La Jarochita	24:03
9	La Jarochita	Dalys la Caribeña	24:27
10	Winner	Dalys la Caribeña	24:27

The finals of the tournament took place on August 16, 2019, and saw Daly defeat La Metálica to win the tournament.

== Aftermath ==
Daly was originally scheduled to face Marcela for the CMLL World Women's Championship at the CMLL 86th Anniversary Show, but due to Marcela suffering an injury in the weeks leading up to the show, that match was cancelled. Instead Daly faced La Metálica in a rematch of the Universal Amazonas tournament finals, this time with the Mexican National Women's Championship instead. La Metálica won the match, albeit in controversial fashion, to retain the championship. Dalys la Caribeña did challenge Marcela for the world title on December 25, 2019, but lost the match.
