= CMLL World Micro-Estrellas Championship =

Professional wrestling midget championship

- The Micro-Estrellas championship belt

Details
- Promotion: Consejo Mundial de Lucha Libre
- Date established: December 11, 2019
- Current champion: keMalito
- Date won: January 1, 2025
Statistics
- First champion: Chamuel
- Longest reign: Chamuel (1040 days)
- Shortest reign: Tengu (683+ days)

The CMLL World Micro-Estrellas Championship (Campeonato Mundial Micro-Estrellas de CMLL in Spanish) is a professional wrestling championship promoted by the Mexican lucha libre wrestling-based promotion Consejo Mundial de Lucha Libre (CMLL; Spanish for "World Wrestling Council"). The championship is exclusively competed for in the Micro-Estrellas, or Micros, division where all competitors have dwarfism.

The championship was revealed on December 11, 2019. It is the first Mexican-based championship solely for wrestlers with dwarfism. As it is a professional wrestling championship, it is not won legitimately; it is instead won via a scripted ending to a match or awarded to a wrestler because of a storyline. Chamuel was the inaugural champion. He won a six-man torneo cibernetico elimination match on December 25, 2019.

== Background ==
The origins of the Micro-Estrella division lies in midget wrestling, which in Mexico was popularized in the 1970s when promoters used the American concept and had a number of Mexicans with dwarfism, individuals with an adult height of less than 147 centimetres (4 ft 10 in), perform as a "special attraction" on lucha libre shows. In the early days, popular wrestlers included Gran Nikolai, Pequeno Goliath and Arturito. By the 1980s midget wrestling was less popular in Mexico, especially since few new wrestlers had joined the division. (Note: Chapter You ain't seen nothing yet: the minis) In the early 1990s Consejo Mundial de Lucha Libre (CMLL), created a new concept, the Mini-Estrella division. The division was created by Antonio Peña, who worked for CMLL at the time; he came up with the idea of using both wrestlers with dwarfism and wrestlers who were simply very short, and to have those Mini-Estrellas work as smaller versions of popular wrestlers of the time. Peña and CMLL created the CMLL World Mini-Estrella Championship in 1992, which is considered the official birth of the division. CMLL's Mini-Estrellas division featured a number of skilled, high-flying wrestlers, which helped make the concept an immediate success, replacing midget wrestling with the Mini-Estrellas division in Mexico.

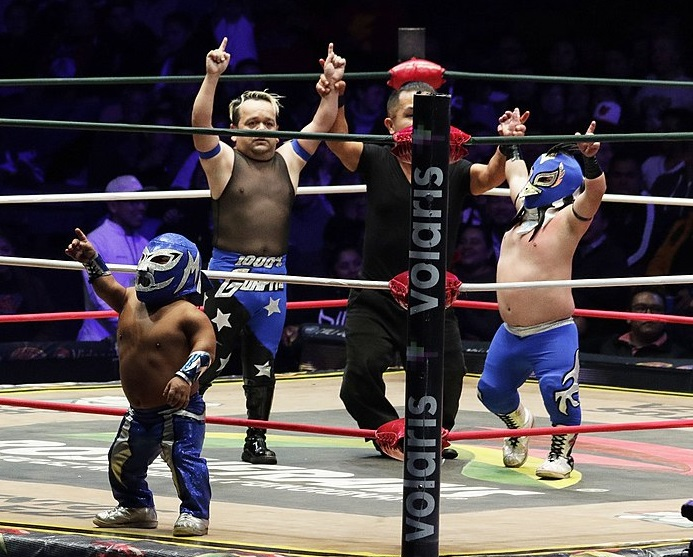
Three of the micro-estrellas and a micro-estrella referee in a CMLL ring

On April 30, 2017, CMLL began promoting a series of matches for the Micro-Estrellas ("Micro Stars") division, with all competitors being people with dwarfism. In the first match in the new division, Microman and Gallito defeated the team of Mije and Zacarías el Perico. The match even had a micro referee, as would the Micro-Estrella matches going forward. Prior to the match Gallito, Mije and Zacarías had worked as mascotas for various CMLL wrestlers and got physically involved in matches, but they hardly ever wrestled. In subsequent years the Micro-Estrellas became a regular feature on CMLL shows, leading to the first Micro-Estrellas lucha de apuestas, mask vs. mask match between Microman and Chamuel at the CMLL 86th Anniversary Show. In that match, Chamuel lost and was forced to unmask. On the December 11, 2019, Informa show CMLL introduced the CMLL World Micro-Estrellas Championship and unveiled the size-appropriate championship belt. Chamuel was the first CMLL World Micro-Estrellas Champion, having won a six-man torneo cibernetico elimination match on December 25, 2019, to become the inaugural champion.

As with all professional wrestling championships, matches for the CMLL World Micro-Estrellas Championship are not won or lost competitively, but by a pre-planned ending to a match, with the outcome determined by the CMLL bookers and match makers. (Note: Hornbaker (2016) p. 550: "Professional wrestling is a sport in which match finishes are predetermined. Thus, win–loss records are not indicative of a wrestler's genuine success based on their legitimate abilities – but on now much, or how little they were pushed by promoters") On occasion the promotion declares a championship vacant, which means there is no champion at that time. This can either be due to a storyline (Note: Duncan & Will (2000) p. 271, Chapter: Texas: NWA American Tag Team Title [World Class, Adkisson] "Championship held up and rematch ordered because of the interference of manager Gary Hart") or real-life issues such as a champion suffering an injury (Note: Duncan & Will (2000) p. 20, Chapter: (United States: 19th Century & widely defended titles – NWA, WWF, AWA, IW, ECW, NWA) NWA/WCW TV Title "Rhodes stripped on 85/10/19 for not defending the belt after having his leg broken by Ric Flair and Ole & Arn Anderson") or leaving the company. (Note: Duncan & Will (2000) p. 201, Chapter: (Memphis, Nashville) Memphis: USWA Tag Team Title "Vacant on 93/01/18 when Spike leaves the USWA.") The championship is the first exclusively for people with dwarfism in Mexico. Similar championships have been promoted in the United States, such as the NWA World Midget's Championship, (Note: Duncan & Will (2000) p. 397, chapter North America: NWA World Midget's title.) and Mini-Estrella championships have been promoted in Mexico since 1992, but those are not exclusively for wrestlers with dwarfism.

== Title history ==
Key
No.	Overall reign number
Reign	Reign number for the specific champion
Days	Number of days held

No.	Champion	Championship change			Reign statistics		Notes	Ref.
No.	Champion	Date	Event	Location	Reign	Days	Notes	Ref.
Consejo Mundial de Lucha Libre (CMLL)
1	Chamuel	December 25, 2019	CMLL Navidad	Mexico City, Mexico	1	1,040	Defeated Microman, El Gallito, Zacarías el Perico, Guapito, and Átomo	
2	Micro Gemelo Diablo I	October 30, 2022	CMLL Domingos Arena Mexico	Mexico City, Mexico	1	657		
—	Vacated	August 17, 2024	—	—	—	—	Micro Gemelo Diablo I vacated the title after leaving CMLL.	
3	Tengu	January 1, 2025	CMLL Sin Salida	Mexico City, Mexico	1	268	Tengu defeated KeMalito to win the vacant title.	
4	KeMalito	September 26, 2025	CMLL Noche de Campeones	Mexico City, Mexico	1	415+		

== Combined reigns ==
As of November 15, 2026.

†	Indicates the current champion

Rank	Wrestler	No. of reigns	Combined days
1	Chamuel (wrestler)	1	1,040
2	Micro Gemelo Diablo I	1	657
3	KeMalito †	1	415+
4	Tengu	1	268

== Tournaments ==
=== 2019 ===
CMLL held a six-man torneo cibernetico elimination match featuring Microman, Chamuel El Gallito, Zacarías el Perico, Guapito, and Átomo on December 25, 2019 to determine the first CMLL World Micro-Estrellas Champion. The first wrestler eliminated was Átomo, pinned by Zacarías. Eliminations two through four were: Guapito (by El Gallito), Zacarías (by Microman) and El Gallito (by Chamuel). In the end Chamuel pinned longtime rival Microman to win the match and the championship.

#	Eliminated	Eliminated by
1	Átomo	Zacarías el Perico
2	Guapito	El Gallito
3	Zacarías el Perico	Microman
4	El Gallito	Chamuel
5	Microman	Chamuel
6	Chamuel – Winner	

== Bibliography ==
- Duncan, Royal; Will, Gary (2000). Wrestling title histories: professional wrestling champions around the world from the 19th century to the present. Waterloo, ON: Archeus Communications. ISBN 0-9698161-5-4.
- Hornbaker, Tim (2016). "Statistical notes". Legends of Pro Wrestling - 150 years of headlocks, body slams, and piledrivers (Revised ed.). New York, New York: Sports Publishing. p. 550. ISBN 978-1-61321-808-2.
- Madigan, Dan (2007). Mondo Lucha a Go Go: the bizarre & honorable world of wild Mexican wrestling. New York, New York: HarperCollins Publishers. ISBN 978-0-06-085583-3.
