= Chamuel (wrestler) =

Mexican professional wrestler

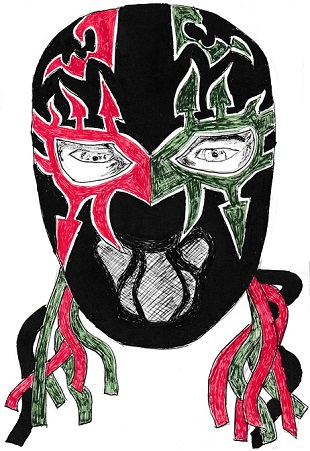
- Artist rendition of the mask Chamuel wore until he lost it in September 2019.

Personal information
- Born: José Francisco García Cruz; August 12, 1993 (age 33) Texmelucan, Puebla, Mexico

Professional wrestling career
- Ring name: Chamuel
- Billed height: 1.28 m (4 ft 2 in)
- Debut: 2012

José Francisco García Cruz (born August 12, 1993) is a Mexican professional wrestler, who works under the ring name Chamuel. He works for the Mexican promotion Consejo Mundial de Lucha Libre (CMLL), where he portrays a heel (known as a rudo in lucha libre, the antagonists of professional wrestling). He is one of the competitors in CMLL's Micro-Estrella ("Micro-Star") division, where he competes with and against other wrestlers with dwarfism. His ring name is based on Camael, the archangel of strength, courage and war from Christian and Jewish mythology.

From his debut in 2012 until 2017, he worked primarily on the Mexican independent circuit as a mascota and with occasional tag team partner Henry, portraying an "evil doll" in the style of Chucky. In 2017, he joined CMLL, and in 2019, he lost his mask to Microman at the CMLL 86th Anniversary Show. He is the first holder of the CMLL World Micro-Estrella Championship.

== Professional wrestling career ==
=== Early career (2012–2017) ===
Chamuel made his professional wrestling début in 2012, working as the tag team partner of regular-sized wrestler Henry. The two portrayed a masked monster/doll duo, with Chamuel initially wearing a mask resembling a ventriloquist's dummy, which was later changed to an evil clown mask. In his first recorded match, Chamuel and Henry teamed up with Monsther and Chucky to defeat Gran Alebrije, Pequeño Cuije, Don Pollo and Pollito. By 2012, Chamuel regularly worked for the local promotion in Pachuca. On February 21, Chamuel defeated Chucky in a Lucha de Apuestas ("bet match") that saw him win the evil doll's mask. Two months later, he won the mask of Gallito Feliz. In July, he was one of eight men risking their mask on the outcome of a steel cage match, but kept his mask safe by escaping the cage early. In October, Chamuel won the hair of El Loquito in a three-way match that also included Mostruolin. Chamuel ended 2012 by surviving another steel cage match with his mask, watching as The Medic's II was unmasked at the end of the match.

=== Consejo Mundial de Lucha Libre (2017–present) ===
In mid-2017, Chamuel was hired by Consejo Mundial de Lucha Libre (CMLL) to be part of their newly created "Micro-Estrellas" (Micro Stars) division. In his debut, Chamuel teamed up with Mije, only to lose to Microman and El Gallito. For the first anniversary of the Micro-Estrellas division, CMLL held an eight-micros torneo cibernetico elimination match, featuring the entire active Micro-Estrella division at the time. Chamuel teamed up with Angelito, El Gallito and Mije to take on Microman, Atomo, Guapito and Zacarías el Perico. In the end, Microman pinned Chamuel to win the tournament.

Following the anniversary, Microman and Chamuel began a long-running storyline feud, which often saw Chamuel either tear Microman's mask open or steal it during a match. The Micro-Estrellas made their début at a major CMLL show on November 11, 2018, when Microman, Atomo and Gallito defeated Chamuel, Mije and Zacarías two falls to one at Día de Muertos ("Day of the Dead"). In a rematch at Homenaje a Dos Leyendas ("Homage to Two Legends") on March 15, 2019, Microman's team was victorious over Chamuel's. The Microman/Chamuel feud led to the first one-on-one match in the Micro division on August 30, as part of CMLL's International Gran Prix. Chamuel lost via disqualification for throwing his mask to Microman in an attempt to deceive the referee. The feud between the two led to a mask vs. mask Lucha de Apuestas at the CMLL 86th Anniversary Show on September 27, marking the first time in 32 years that two "Micros" had a Lucha de Apuestas. Microman won the third and deciding fall, forcing Chamuel to unmask and reveal his real name, per lucha libre traditions.

On December 25, 2019, Chamuel outlasted Microman, El Gallito, Guapito, Zacarías and Átomo in a torneo cibernetico to win the newly created CMLL World Micro-Estrellas Championship, lastly eliminating Microman. At the CMLL 87th Anniversary Show on September 25, 2020, he made his first successful title defense against Microman. Chamuel retained the title against Micro Gemelo Diablo I on March 15, 2022, only to lose it in a rematch on October 30. He failed to regain the title from Micro Gemalo Diablo I on May 31, 2024. On April 16, 2026, Chamuel participated in CMLL's first standalone event in the United States at Palms Slam Fest, teaming with Tengu in a loss to KeMalito and Periquito Sacaryas.

=== Independent circuit (2017–present) ===
While working for CMLL, Chamuel, like all CMLL wrestlers, is allowed to take independent circuit bookings on days he is not needed by the company. Chamuel's independent circuit appearances usually sees him team with, and face off against, other CMLL Micro-Estrellas. On September 15, 2018, Microman, and Gallito defeated Chamuel and Zacarías in a match at the Benito Juarez ExpoMuseo in Mexico City. The Micro-Estrellas also made a special appearance for The Crash Lucha Libre, one of Mexico's largest independent promotions, with Microman and Gallito once again defeating Chamuel and Zacarías in their March 2, 2019 match.

== Reception ==
While the CMLL 86th Anniversary Show, in general, was given mediocre reviews the match between Micro Man and Chamuel was well received. Richard Gallegos of the Voices of Wrestling stated that "Microman and Chamuel saved the night with their fantastic Apuestas Match", and a Cage Side Seats review named it the "match of the night".

== Championships and accomplishments ==
- Consejo Mundial de Lucha Libre
  - CMLL World Micro-Estrella Championship (1 time)

== Luchas de Apuestas record ==
Winner (wager)	Loser (wager)	Location	Event	Date	Notes
Chamuel (mask)	Chucky (mask)	Pachuca, Hidalgo, Mexico	Arena Aficion show	February 21, 2012	
Chamuel (mask)	Gallito Feliz (mask)	Pachuca, Hidalgo, Mexico	Arena Aficion show	April 10, 2012	
Chamuel (mask)	El Loquito (hair)	Pachuca, Hidalgo, Mexico	Arena Aficion show	October 2, 2012	
Microman (mask)	Chamuel (mask)	Mexico City	CMLL 86th Anniversary Show	September 27, 2019	
