= Mije (wrestler) =

Mexican professional wrestler

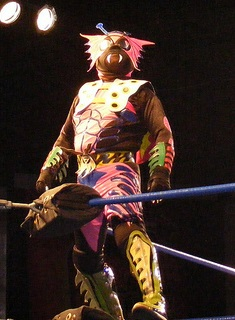

Personal information
- Born: Unrevealed (Note: Traditionally Mexican sources will not report on the birth name of a masked wrestler who has never been unmasked in the ring.); June 27, 1969 (age 57) Huehotzingo, Puebla, Mexico

Professional wrestling career
- Ring names: Cuije; Baby Rabit; Pequeño Cuije; Mije
- Billed height: 1.1 m (3 ft 7 in)
- Billed weight: 32 kg (71 lb)
- Trained by: El Mohicano; Los Jibaritos; El Alebrije
- Debut: 1998

Mije (born June 27, 1969) is a Mexican professional wrestler best known for his time with Consejo Mundial de Lucha Libre (CMLL), where he portrayed a heel (or rudo, the antagonists of professional wrestling). He was one of the competitors in CMLL's Micro-Estrella ("Micro-Star") division, where he competed with and against other wrestlers with dwarfism.

He started his career working as a Mascota, a smaller version of a regular-sized wrestler, paired with El Alebrije, working under the name Cuije in AAA. Cuije and El Alebrije would occasionally team up and won the AAA Mascot Tag Team Championship, holding the record for the longest reign with that championship. The duo also competed in Chikara's King of Trios tournament. He began working for CMLL in 2010 as part of the Los Invasores group, remaining there until 2025. His name was changed to Mije in 2012 following a lawsuit against AAA over the copyright of the characters Cuije and El Alebrije.

== Professional wrestling career ==
=== AAA (1998–2009) ===
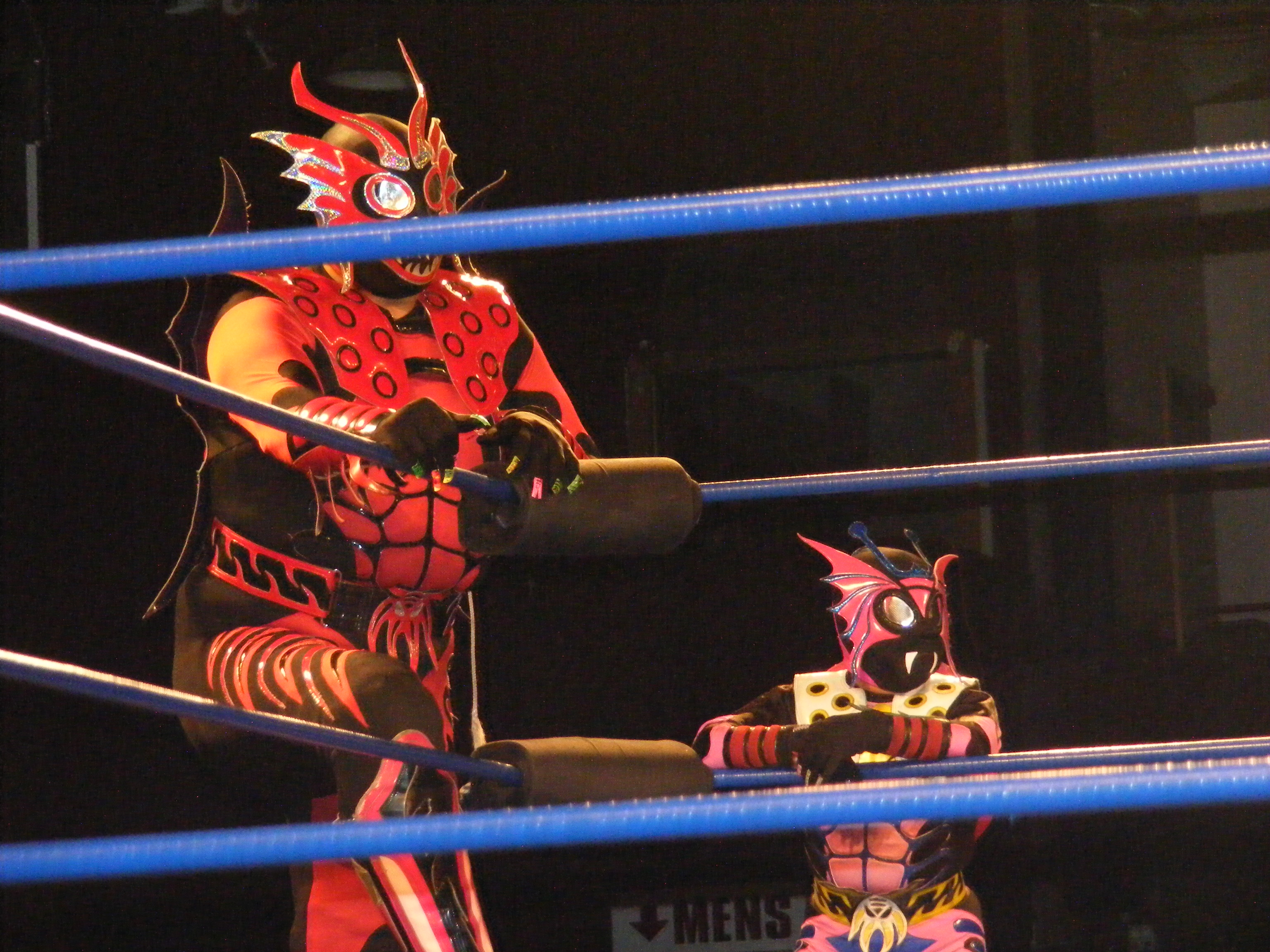
Alebrije and Cuije during a match.

In 1998, the Mexican professional wrestling promotion AAA introduced the wrestling character El Alebrije, a bright and colorful comedic character based on the Alebrije figures. AAA paired up El Alebrije with a mascota, a smaller version of the character portrayed by a little person, called Cuije. The duo often faced Monsther and his diminutive sidekick, Chucky, as part of a long-running storyline feud between the two teams.

During this period of time, Cuije rarely wrestled, with his first recorded match taking place in April 2002 in Monterrey, where he lost to Chucky. On August 31, 2003, the colorful duo teamed with Máscara Sagrada and Mascarita Sagrada in a loss to Los Headhunters (I and II) and Los Mini Head Hunters (I and II) at Verano de Escándalo ("Summer of Scandal"). On August 20, 2004 Cuije and El Alebrije won the AAA Mascot Tag Team Championship by defeating champions Máscara Sagrada/Mascarita Sagrada, as well as Monsther/Chucky and Psicosis/Mini Psicosis. They would defend the championship in subsequent years, primarily against Chucky and Monsther. Their final official AAA Mascota Tag Team Championship match took place on December 2, 2007, where they defeated Chucky and Monsther and the team of Guapito and Scorpio Jr.

=== Independent circuit (2009–2010) ===
In April 2009, Cuije and El Alebrije left AAA, citing their dissatisfaction with the amount of opportunities they were given in recent years. After leaving AAA, Alebrije, with Cuije at his side, began working on the Mexican independent circuit, especially for International Wrestling Revolution Group (IWRG) and Perros del Mal Producciones.

While Cuije and El Alebrije continued to use the names they were given by AAA, the company claimed that they owned the characters. To try and address this issue, the team began working as "Pequeño Cuije" ("Little Cuije") and "Gran Alebrije" ("Big Alebrije") when appearing for Extreme Air Wrestling. El Alebrije and Cuije made their first appearance for the Philadelphia, Pennsylvania-based Chikara as part of the 2010 King of Trios tournament that ran from April 23 to 25 at The Arena; Cuije wrestled alongside Alebrije and El Oriental as Team Perros del Mal. After defeating "Team Delicioso" (Curry Man, El Hijo del Ice Cream and Ice Cream Jr.) in their opening round match, Team Perros del Mal was eliminated in the quarterfinals by Der Bruderschaft des Kreuzes (Ares, Claudio Castagnoli and Tursas). Cuije and El Alebrije were never officially stripped of the AAA Mascot Tag Team Championship, and on November 23, 2011, the team lost a match to El Pulpito and El Pulpo in Rio Bravo, Tamaulipa, where Los Pulpos were given the championship belts, even though the match was not officially recognized by AAA.

=== Consejo Mundial de Lucha Libre (2010–2025) ===
On April 12, 2010, a contingent of former AAA wrestlers including Cuije, El Alebrije, Histeria, Psicosis II and Maniaco appeared at a Consejo Mundial de Lucha Libre (CMLL) show in Puebla. The group drove into the arena in a black SUV and attacked El Hijo del Fantasma, La Máscara and La Sombra after they had just finished wrestling. Brazo de Plata, Místico and Jon Strongman tried to help out, but were kept away by CMLL rudos Averno, El Texano Jr. and El Terrible. Following the attack, the former AAA wrestlers returned to the SUV and left the arena. After weeks of run-ins, the group, dubbed Los Independientes ("The Independents"; named after the independent circuit), wrestled their first match for CMLL on April 26, where El Alebrije, Histeria and Psicosis defeated El Hijo del Fantasma, La Máscara and La Sombra, as Cuije helped them cheat throughout the match. While Los Invasores disbanded the following year, Alebrije and Cuije became a regular fixture on CMLL shows, often with Cuije clashing with fellow mascotas KeMonito and Zacarías el Perico; brawls between any of the Mascotas usually drew a loud reaction from the crowd.

In January 2012, CMLL repackaged Cuije, Alebrije, and Histeria with new ring characters. Alebrije returned to performing under the Kraneo gimmick, while Cuije was renamed Mije since AAA claimed the copyright ownership of the names and characters. In early 2017, CMLL recruited Mije and fellow mascota Zacarías to help establish a Micro-Estrellas ("Micro-Stars") division, featuring only wrestlers with dwarfism. The first match of the Micro-Estrellas division took place on April 30, 2017, which saw Microman and El Gallito defeat Mije and Zacarías in a special featured match. Mije and the Micro-Estrellas would appear on various CMLL shows, as well as making special appearances on the Mexican independent circuit for The Crash Lucha Libre, Promociones El Cholo, and Desastre Total Ultraviolento. For the first anniversary of the Micro-Estrellas division, CMLL held an eight-micros torneo cibernético elimination match, featuring the entire active Micro-Estrella division at the time; Mije, Angelito, Chamuel and El Gallito fought Átomo, Guapito, Microman and Zacarías. In the end, Microman pinned Chamuel to win the tournament, while Mije was the third man eliminated from the match.

On November 2, 2018, as part of the Día de Muertos ("Day of the Dead") supercard, Mije, Chamuel and Zacarías lost to Átomo, El Gallito and Microman two falls to one. Four weeks later, the Micro-Estrellas also appeared at Leyendas Mexicanas ("Mexican Legends") on November 30, where Mije, Chamuel and Zacarías lost to Microman, El Gallito and Guapito in the second match of the night. At Homenaje a Dos Leyendas ("Homage to Two Legends") on March 15, 2019, Mije, Chamuel and Zacarías el Perico were once again defeated. Mije quietly left CMLL in 2025, followed by Kraneo the following year.

== Reception ==
Súper Luchas magazine described the Micro-Estrellas division debut match between Microman and El Gallito vs. Mije and Zacarías as "an encounter with a fall that literally stole the night."

== Championships and accomplishments ==
- AAA

- AAA Mascot Tag Team Championship (1 time) – with El Alebrije
