= El Gallito =

Mexican professional wrestler

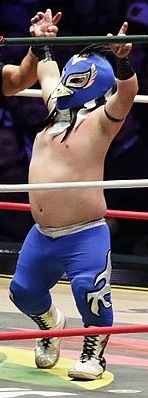
- El Gallito after winning a match on November 30, 2018

Personal information
- Born: Unrevealed (Note: Traditionally Mexican sources will not report on the birth name of a masked wrestler who has never been unmasked in the ring.); October 26, 1991 (age 34)

Professional wrestling career
- Ring names: Gallito Tapatio; El Gallito
- Billed height: 1.15 m (3 ft 9 in)
- Trained by: Máscara Mágica; Magnum; Último Guerrero
- Debut: 2012

El Gallito (born October 26, 1991) is a Mexican professional wrestler. He is known for his time with the Mexican Consejo Mundial de Lucha Libre (CMLL) promotion where he portrayed a face (known as a tecnico, the "good guys" of professional wrestling). He was one of the competitors in CMLL's Micro-Estrella (Spanish for "Micro-Star") division where he competed with and against other wrestlers with dwarfism.

He started his professional wrestling career as a mascota companion for the regular-sized wrestler El Gallo, on who El Gallito's ring persona, masks and tights are patterned on. In 2017 he became an active wrestler in the Micro-Estrella division. He was originally known as El Gallito Tapatio, Spanish for "The Little Rooster from Guadalajara", later shortened to just "The Little Rooster".

== Professional wrestling career ==
El Gallito ("The Little Rooster") started his professional wrestling career as a mascota for El Gallo ("The Rooster") in 2012. As a mascota, he portrayed a diminutive version of El Gallo and competed as the same rooster character as him.. The rooster imagery was supported by his mask, complete with a fake cockscomb on top of his head and fabric wattles dangling from his chin. As a mascota he would accompany El Gallo to the ring; the character was created primarily to appeal to children and assist El Gallo to portray a tecnico character (called a face, the protagonists in professional wrestling).

=== Consejo Mundial de Lucha Libre (2017–2022) ===
In early 2017 CMLL recruited El Gallito and his fellow mascotas Mije and Zacarías el Perico to help establish a Micro-Estrellas ("Micro-Stars") division, featuring only wrestlers with dwarfism. The first match of the Micro-Estrellas division took place on April 30, 2017, and saw El Gallito and Microman defeat Mije and Zacarías in a special featured match. For the first anniversary of the Micro-Estrellas division, CMLL held an eight-micros torneo cibernetico elimination match, featuring the entire active Micro-Estrella division at the time. Gallito, Mije, Angelito, and Chamuel took on Microman, Atomo, Guapito, and Zacarías, which saw Microman pin Chamuel to win the tournament while Galliot was the fourth to be eliminated from the match.

For the 2018 Día de Muertos ("Day of the Dead") supercard show Gallito, Microman, and Atomo defeated Mije, Chamuel, and Zacarías two falls to one. Four weeks later the Micro-Estrellas also appeared at CMLL's Leyendas Mexicanas ("Mexican Legends") show where Gallito, Microman, and Guapito defeated Mije, Chamuel, and Zacarías in the second match of the night. At the 2019 version of the Homenaje a Dos Leyendas ("Homage to two legends") show El Gallito and his team once again won their match. With the popularity of the Micro-Estrellas division, CMLL introduced the CMLL World Micro-Estrellas Championship in December 2019. El Gallito and five other Micro-Estrellas (Chamuel, Atomo, Microman, Guapito, and Zacarías) were involved in the elimination match to determine the first champion on December 25. El Gallito was the second-to-last man eliminated from the match. In the end, Chamuel pinned Microman to eliminate him and win the championship. He left CMLL in February 2022.

=== Independent circuit (2017–present) ===
While working for CMLL, El Gallito, like all wrestlers employed by the company, is allowed to take independent circuit bookings on days he is not needed for their shows. El Gallito's independent circuit appearances usually sees him team with, and face off against, other CMLL Micro-Estrellas. His first non-CMLL match was on June 14, 2017, on a Promociones El Cholo show in Tijuana, Baja California, and saw El Gallito and Microman defeat Mije and Zacarías by disqualification. On September 15, 2018, El Gallito and Microman defeated Chamuel and Zacarías in a match at the Benito Juarez ExpoMuseo in Mexico City. The Micro-Estrellas also competed at Desastre Total Ultraviolento's 11th Anniversary Show, which saw Gallito and Microman defeating Mije and Zacarías. They also made a special appearance for The Crash Lucha Libre, one of Mexico's largest independent promotions, with El Gallito and Microman once again defeating Chamuel and Zacarías in their March 2, 2019 match.

== Reception ==
Súper Luchas magazine described the Micro-Estrellas division debut match between Microman and El Gallito vs. Mije and Zacarías, as "an encounter with a fall that literally stole the night."
