= CMLL International Gran Prix (2019) =

2019 Consejo Mundial de Lucha Libre professional wrestling show

- Official poster for the show
- Promotion(s): Consejo Mundial de Lucha Libre; The Crash Lucha Libre; Ring of Honor
- Date: August 30, 2019
- City: Mexico City, Mexico
- Venue: Arena México

Event chronology
← Previous; Universal Amazons Championship	Next → Global Wars Espectacular

International Gran Prix chronology
← Previous; 2018	Next → 2021

The CMLL International Gran Prix (2019) was a lucha libre, or professional wrestling, tournament produced and scripted by the Mexican professional wrestling promotion Consejo Mundial de Lucha Libre (CMLL; "World Wrestling Council" in Spanish) which took place on August 30, 2019 in Arena México, Mexico City, Mexico, CMLL's main venue. The 2019 International Gran Prix was the sixteenth time CMLL has held an International Gran Prix tournament since 1994. All International Gran Prix tournaments have been a one-night tournament, always as part of CMLL's Friday night CMLL Super Viernes shows.

The International Gran Prix saw the team of (Cavernario, Negro Casas, El Cuatrero, Diamante Azul, Dragon Lee, Rush, Soberano Jr. and Volador Jr. represented Mexico while Big Daddy, Jay Briscoe, Delirious, Luke Hawx, Kenny King, Mecha Wolf 450, Matt Taven and Oraculo represented the United States or Puerto Rico. The match came down to Negro Casas and Volador Jr., both representing Mexico, which saw Volador Jr. take advantage of the situation to pin Casas to claim the International Gran Prix trophy for a second time. On the undercard the storyline between Último Guerrero and Ciber the Main Man, also drawing in Gilbert el Boricua as part of the evolving storyline.

== Production ==
=== Background ===
In 1994, the Mexican professional wrestling promotion Consejo Mundial de Lucha Libre created the International Gran Prix tournament which took place on April 15 that saw Rayo de Jalisco Jr. defeat King Haku to win the tournament. the tournament became annual tournament but after the 1998 tournament, the tournament became inactive. in 2002, the tournament returned with new rules. (Mexico and International group vs another Mexican and International group and then Mexicans vs Japanese and finally Mexico vs International) the 2019 tournament will be 16th in the series. The tournament traditionally sees a team of Mexican born CMLL wrestlers face off against foreign-born wrestlers, for the 2019 tournament this meant wrestlers from the United States or Puerto Rico.

=== Storylines ===
The 2019 Gran Prix show will feature an undisclosed number of professional wrestling matches scripted by CMLL with some wrestlers involved in scripted feuds. The wrestlers portray either heels (referred to as rudos in Mexico, those that play the part of the "bad guys") or faces (técnicos in Mexico, the "good guy" characters) as they perform.

Team Resto del Mundo

- Big Daddy
- Jay Briscoe (USA, Ring of Honor; Participated in 2018)
- Delirious (USA, Ring of Honor; replaced Mark Briscoe who was injured)
- Luke Hawx (USA, The Crash)
- Kenny King (USA, Ring of Honor; Participated in 2017)
- Mecha Wolf 450 (Puerto Rico, The Crash)
- Matt Taven (USA, Ring of Honor; participated in 2017 and 2018)
- Oraculo (USA, The Crash)

Team Mexico

- Cavernario
- Negro Casas
- El Cuatrero
- Diamante Azul (Won the 2017 Gran Prix)
- Dragon Lee
- Rush
- Soberano Jr.
- Volador Jr. (Won the 2016 Gran Prix)

== Results ==
No.	Results	Stipulations
1	La Jarochita and Marcela defeated Dalys la Caribeña and La Metálica	Best two-out-of-three falls tag team match
2	Atlantis Jr., Audaz, and Flyer defeated El Hijo del Villano III, Rey Bucanero, and Tiger	Six-man "Lucha Libre rules" tag team match
3	Chamuel defeated Microman by disqualification	Singles match
4	Sangre Dinamita (El Cuatrero and Sansón) and Templario defeated Ángel de Oro, Niebla Roja, Valiente	Six-man "Lucha Libre rules" tag team match
5	Ciber the Main Man, Gilbert el Boricua, and Titán defeated Carístico, Místico, and Último Guerrero	Six-man "Lucha Libre rules" tag team match
6	Volador Jr. won the International Gran Prix by pinning Negro Casas; Also in the match: Team Mexico (Cavernario, El Cuatrero, Diamante Azul, Dragon Lee, Rush, and Soberano Jr.) and Team Resto del Mundo (Big Daddy, Jay Briscoe, Delirious, Luke Hawx, Kenny King, Mecha Wolf 450, Matt Taven and Oraculo)	2019 International Gran Prix, 16-man torneo cibernetico elimination match
