= Kira (wrestler) =

Mexican professional wrestler

Personal information
- Born: Unrevealed; July 30, 2003 (age 23) Torreón, Coahuila

Professional wrestling career
- Ring name(s): Estrellita Lagunera; Centella; Andrómeda; Kira
- Billed height: 1.50 m (4 ft 11 in)
- Billed weight: 45 kg (99 lb)
- Trained by: Gran Jefe III; Gran Jefe IV (Tarantula); Hijo de Halcón Suriano; Halcón Suriano Jr.
- Debut: 2010

Kira (born July 30, 2003, in Torreón, Coahuila) is a Mexican professional wrestler working for the Mexican promotion Consejo Mundial de Lucha Libre (CMLL). Her real name is not a matter of public record, as is often the case with masked wrestlers in Mexico where their private lives are kept a secret from the wrestling fans.

== Career ==
=== Local (2012–2023) ===
She made her debut in her hometown of Torreón at only nine years old, but only in exhibitions against her father and older trainers. Under the name Estrellita Lagunera she was a part of a big wrestling dynasty in Comarca Lagunera-area, Los Gran Jefes. She was the groups only female member, and is the daughter of wrestler Gran Jefe III. During this time she was part of the trio group La Tribu Lagunera, where she played an evil character. Their rivals during this time in the late 2010s were Linda Llamarada and Diosa Quetzal, two much older and more experienced female wrestlers. They feuded over the Mataleon Universal Tag Team Championships, in local promotion Mataleon.

In her younger years she wrestled only in Comarca Lagunera: Torreón and Gómez Palacio. Locally she was very early praised for her daredevil aerial style of wrestling, performing moves such as springboards and her finisher being a 450 splash, moves very few women in wrestling perform. Some of the clips her moves went viral on Facebook and Twitter. During the latter part of the 2010s she also wrestled for the Monterrey based promotion Lucha Libre Feminil, a wrestling promotion dedicated solely to female professional wrestling.

She participated in the TV show Little Big Shots, showing off her wrestling with father and trainer Gran Jefe III.

On August 19, 2018, she won the UWF World Women's Championship against Perla Lagunera in the arena Terraza Elma in Apodaca, Nuevo León. She defended the title six times before losing it again to Perla Lagunera (later known as Artemiz) August 19, 2019. In a 2019 interview she claimed her biggest career goal was working for Consejo Mundial de Lucha Libre. In 2020 she signed a contract with Kaoz Lucha Libre, at the time the major promotion in the Monterrey and Regiomontano-area.

She later claimed the local Arena Colon Women's Championship in 2022, a title she held for a year, defending it three times, before vacating it when moving to Mexico City.

In February 2023 she moved to Mexico City to pursue a more professional wrestling career and started working independent dates in the area, for International Wrestling Revolution Group among other places and throughout the whole country, also in The Crash Lucha Libre. She has also wrestled in Colombia.

=== Lucha Libre AAA Worldwide (2023) ===
On July 8, 2023, at 19 years old, she made her debut in Lucha Libre AAA Worldwide during a TV-show in Orizaba, Veracruz with the new ring name Centella. Her debut was described a success, once again gaining attention for her aerial style, performing moves such as the dragonrana and asai moonsault from the top rope. Centella worked one more TV match for AAA, in San Pedro Garza García on August 20, where she was defeated by Sexy Star II in a triple threat match also involving Lady Maravilla.

In interviews she claimed that working for AAA had been a dream, that the name Centella was given to her by the promotion and that they also changed some details to her attire and wrestling mask. She also stated that she would like to challenge for the AAA World Mixed Tag Team Championships together with Komander as they have a similar aerial style and had known each other for a long time.

Centella was scheduled to work a singles match against Chik Tormenta on September 23 at a TV-show in Gimnasio Juan de la Barrera in Mexico City, but however didn't show up for the match. Speculation started immediately that she had decided to jump to rival promotion Consejo Mundial de Lucha Libre ahead of their new female version of the tournament for CMLL Universal Championship called Campeonato Universal de Amazonas.

=== Consejo Mundial de Lucha Libre (2023–present) ===
On Tuesday, September 27, just four days after walking out of AAA, she made her debut for CMLL at one of their Guadalajara events under the new ring name Andrómeda during a lucha atómicos (4v4) match. October 8, she made her debut in Arena México during a non-televised Sunday show, where she and Lady Shadow where defeated by Persephone and Miss Guerrera in the opening match. On October 13 she participated in Block B to crown the new CMLL Universal Amazonas Champion. During the elimination match, she eliminated Nautica with a 450 splash before being eliminated herself due to a Spanish fly from the eventual winner Zeuxis. As Andrómeda in CMLL, she wears her original Estellita Lagunera mask and gear.

== Championships and accomplishments ==
- Consejo Mundial de Lucha Libre

- Mexican National Women's Tag Team Championship (1 time) – with Skadi
