= La Metálica =

Mexican female professional wrestler

Personal information
- Born: Unrevealed (Note: Traditionally Mexican sources will not report on the birth name of a masked wrestler who has never been unmasked in the ring.); November 13, 1994 (age 32) Mexico City, Mexico

Professional wrestling career
- Ring names: Felina Metálica; La Metálica
- Billed height: 1.60 m (5 ft 3 in)
- Billed weight: 52 kg (115 lb)
- Trained by: Rocky Santana; Sadico; Judas el Traidor; Terrorista; Negro Navarro; Justiciero; Robin Maravilla
- Debut: May 13, 2009

La Metálica (born November 13, 1994) is a Mexican professional wrestler signed to Consejo Mundial de Lucha Libre (CMLL). Her given name is not a matter of public record, as is often the case with masked wrestlers in Mexico, where their private lives are kept concealed from the general public. Prior to joining CMLL, she wrestled for seven years under the ring name Felina Metálica ("The Metalic Feline"). She is a former Mexican National Women's Champion.

== Professional wrestling career ==
=== Early career (2009–2016) ===
La Metálica's birth name has not been revealed, nor reported on, which is a tradition in Mexico when a wrestler has not been unmasked. She made her in-ring debut on May 13, 2009, after having trained under Rocky Santana, Sadico, Judas el Traidor, Terrorista, Negro Navarro, Justiciero and Robin Maravilla. One of her early high-profile matches was at the Arena Lopez Mateos 45th Anniversary Show on July 8, 2012, where she, Keira and Sadica defeated Ice Queen, La Hielera and La Vaquerita. Felina Metálica's first documented championship match took place on January 26, 2014, at a Toryumon Mexico show, unsuccessfully challenging Baby Star for the North Women's Championship.

After winning a four-way match against Mystique, Paloma Rouse and Star Fire, Metálica defeated Crazy Star, Reina Dorada and Yuca la Potranquita in another four-way match on June 15 to win the vacant Producciones Sánchez Women's Championship. On November 1, she unsuccessfully challenged Ludark Shaitan for the Fusion Ichiban Kawai Women's Championship in a coffin match. On April 23, 2016, she outlasted La Heronina, Lilith Dark, Star Pink and Zuka to win the Copa WMC Feminil. At Casta de Campeones ("Breed of Champions") on July 15, Metálica successfully defended her title in a five-way match against Lady Maravilla, La Magnífica, Zeuxis and Zuzu Divine.

=== Consejo Mundial de Lucha Libre (2016–present) ===
By September 2016, Felina Metálica began working for Consejo Mundial de Lucha Libre (CMLL), Mexico's largest professional wrestling company, under the ring name "La Metálica". Her first CMLL match took place at Leyendas Mexicanas ("Mexican Legends") on September 16, where she, La Amapola and La Jarochita lost to Estrellita, Marcela and Sanely. The following month, on October 28, La Metálica also wrestled on CMLL's annual Día de Muertos show, where she, La Amapola and Dalys la Caribeña lost to Estrellita, Marcela, and Sanely once more. While under contract with CMLL, the company allowed La Metálica to work on the Mexican independent circuit when she was not needed for CMLL shows. One such independent show match saw La Metálica, La Heroina, Ludark Shaitan, and La Magnifica all risk their masks in a Lucha de Apuestas, or "bet match". La Heroina won the match, pinning La Magnifica who then had to unmask.

She finished 2016 by being one of ten women to risk either their mask or their hair in a steel cage match in the main event of the 2016 Infierno en el Ring supercard show. La Metálica was the second woman to escape the cage, keeping her mask safe while Zeuxis pinned La Vaquerita to win the match. In July 2017, CMLL celebrated female wrestler Natalia Vazquez, one of the pioneers of women's professional wrestling, by holding the Copa Natalia Vazques. The 14-woman torneo cibernetico match saw La Metálica become the second wrestler eliminated. For the CMLL 85th Anniversary Show, La Jarochita, Marcela and Princesa Sugehit defeated Dalys, Metálica and Reyna Isis on the undercard of CMLL's biggest show of the year.

On December 9, 2018, La Metálica defeated Princesa Sugehit in a best two-out-of-three falls match to win the Mexican National Women's Championship, ending Princesa Sugehit's 672-day reign as champion. In April 2019, La Metálica had an opportunity to become a double champion, but Marcela successfully defended the CMLL World Women's Championship. In August CMLL introduced the Universal Amazons Championship tournament, the female equivalence of the CMLL Universal Championship, one of CMLL's biggest tournaments of the year. La Metálica outlasted Marcela, Avispa Dorada, La Amapola, La Guerrera, La Infernal, La Seductora, Maligna, Sanely and Tiffany to qualify for the finals of the tournament. She lost to Dalys in the finals two weeks later. Dalys originally earned a CMLL World Women's Championship match against Marcela, but the champion was injured in the weeks leading up to the show. Instead. La Metálica replaced her, defending the Mexican National Women's Championship at the CMLL 86th Anniversary Show on September 27. The end saw La Metálica awkwardly pin Dalys for a three-count even though Dalys clearly did not have her shoulders down. At the 2019 Día de Muertos show on November 1, Dalys, La Metálica, and Reyna Isis defeated La Jarochita, Lluvia, and Princesa Sugehit, two falls to one. At the CMLL 87th Anniversary Show on September 25, 2020, she lost the Mexican National Women's Championship to Isis. The following month, La Metálica and La Amapola competed in a tournament for the Mexican National Women's Tag Team Championship, defeating La Magnifica and La Silueta in the first round, Isis and Tiffany in the semi-finals, and Marcela and Skadi in the quarterfinals, before losing in the finals to Las Chicas Indomables (La Jarochita and Lluvia). At Día de Muertos on November 5, 2021, they unsuccessfully challenged Las Chicas Indomables for the titles.

== Championships and accomplishments ==
- Consejo Mundial de Lucha Libre

- Mexican National Women's Championship (1 time)
- Torneo Increibles de Amazonas (2025) - with Skadi

- Innovacion de Lucha Libre Mexicana

- DZ Women's Championship (1 time)

- Producciones Sánchez

- Producciones Sánchez Women's Championship (1 time)

- Wrestling Martín Calderón

- Copa WMC Femenil (2016)
