= CMLL 86th Anniversary Show =

2019 Consejo Mundial de Lucha Libre show

- Official poster for the event.
- Promotion: Consejo Mundial de Lucha Libre
- Date: September 27, 2019
- City: Mexico City, Mexico
- Venue: Arena México

Event chronology
← Previous; Global Wars Espectacular	Next → Torneo Gran Alternativa

CMLL Anniversary Shows chronology
← Previous; 85th Anniversary	Next → 87th Anniversary

The CMLL 86th Anniversary Show (Spanish: 86. Aniversario de CMLL) was a major professional wrestling event, scripted and produced by the Mexican lucha libre wrestling company Consejo Mundial de Lucha Libre (CMLL; Spanish for "World Wrestling Council") that took place on September 27, 2019, in CMLL's home arena Arena México in Mexico City, Mexico. The show was the biggest show of the year for CMLL, considered their version of the Super Bowl or WrestleMania. This was the 92nd EMLL/CMLL Anniversary Show (There were two in 1963, 1966, 1972, 1975, 1977, but not held in 1985). The CMLL Anniversary Show series is the longest-running annual professional wrestling show, starting in 1934.

In the main event, Último Guerrero defeated Negro Casas in a steel cage Lucha de Apuestas match that also included Ciber the Main Man, Gilbert el Boricua, Volador Jr., Bárbaro Cavernario, and Big Daddy. As a result of his loss, Casas had all his hair shaved off. The show also featured a mask vs. mask match, the first in the CMLL Micro-Estrella division as Microman defeated Chamuel to unmask him. The show feature five more matches

== Production ==
=== Background ===
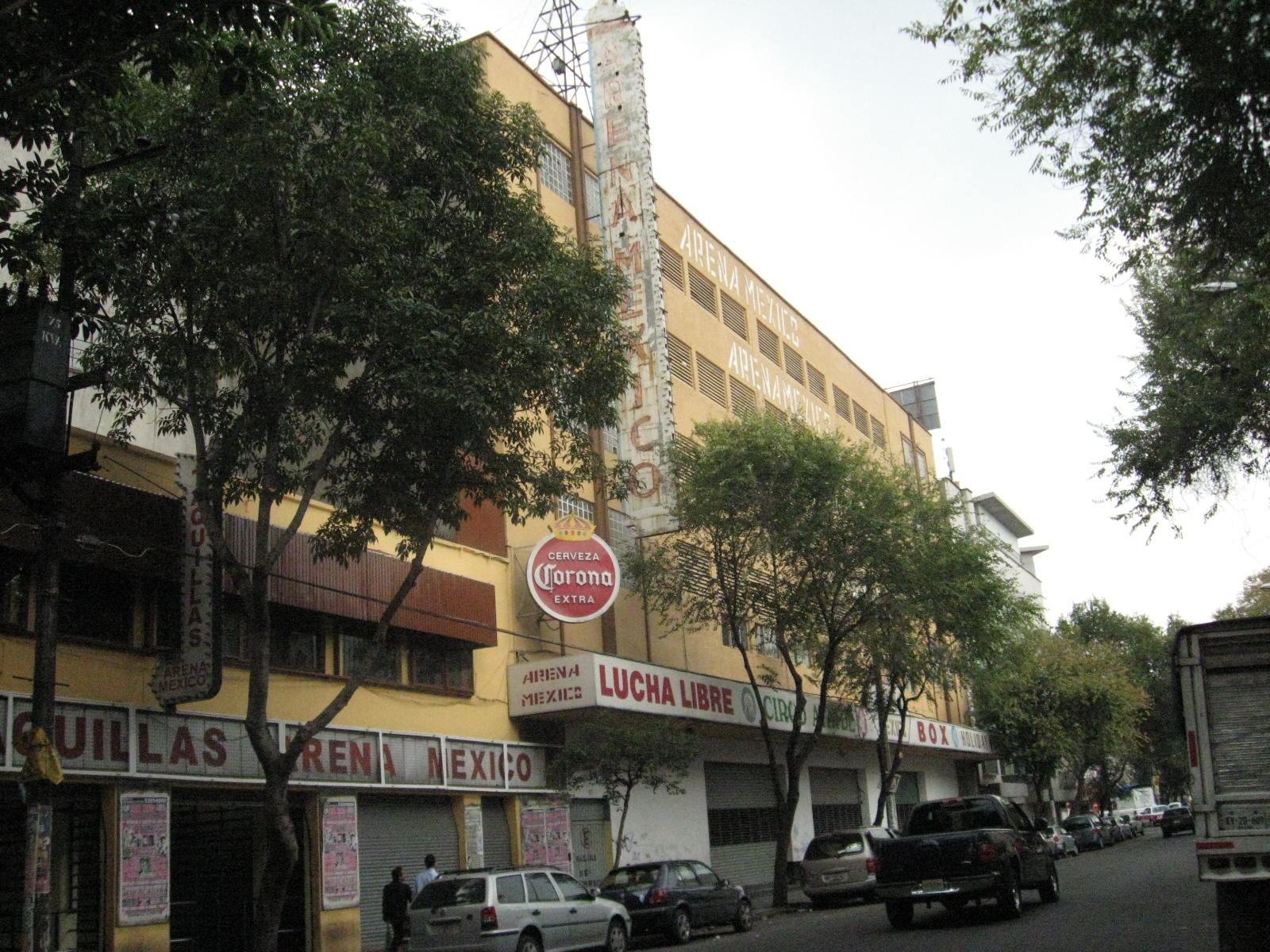
Arena México, CMLL's main venue and location of the 86th Anniversary Show

The Mexican Lucha libre (professional wrestling) company Consejo Mundial de Lucha Libre (CMLL) started out under the name Empresa Mexicana de Lucha Libre ("Mexican Wrestling Company"; EMLL), founded by Salvador Lutteroth in 1933. Lutteroth, inspired by professional wrestling shows he had attended in Texas, decided to become a wrestling promoter and held his first show on September 21, 1933, marking what would be the beginning of organized professional wrestling in Mexico. Lutteroth would later become known as "the father of Lucha Libre" . A year later EMLL held the EMLL 1st Anniversary Show, starting the annual tradition of the Consejo Mundial de Lucha Libre Anniversary Shows that have been held each year ever since, most commonly in September.

Over the years the anniversary show would become the biggest show of the year for CMLL, akin to the Super Bowl for the National Football League (NFL) or WWE's WrestleMania event. The first anniversary show was held in Arena Modelo, which Lutteroth had bought after starting EMLL. In 1942–43 Lutteroth financed the construction of Arena Coliseo, which opened in April 1943. The EMLL 10th Anniversary Show was the first of the anniversary shows to be held in Arena Coliseo. In 1956 Lutteroth had Arena México built in the location of the original Arena Modelo, making Arena México the main venue of EMLL from that point on. Starting with the EMLL 23rd Anniversary Show, all anniversary shows except for the EMLL 46th Anniversary Show have been held in the arena that would become known as "The Cathedral of Lucha Libre". On occasion EMLL held more than one show labelled as their "Anniversary" show, such as two 33rd Anniversary Shows in 1966. Over time the anniversary show series became the oldest, longest-running annual professional wrestling show. In comparison, WWE's WrestleMania is only the fourth oldest still promoted show (CMLL's Arena Coliseo Anniversary Show and Arena México anniversary shows being second and third). EMLL was supposed to hold the EMLL 52nd Anniversary Show on September 20, 1985, but Mexico City was hit by a magnitude 8.0 earthquake. EMLL canceled the event both because of the general devastation but also over fears that Arena México might not be structurally sound after the earthquake.

When Jim Crockett Promotions was bought by Ted Turner in 1988 EMLL became the oldest still active promotion in the world. In 1991 EMLL was rebranded as "Consejo Mundial de Lucha Libre" and thus held the CMLL 59th Anniversary Show, the first under the new name, on September 18, 1992. Traditionally CMLL holds their major events on Friday Nights, replacing their regularly scheduled Super Viernes show.

In early July 2019 Paco Alonso, then-CMLL president, died leaving his daughter Sofia Alonso to take over his position as president of CMLL, the fourth generation Alonso/Lutteroth family member to control the promotion since her great-grandfather Salvador Lutteroth founded the promotion in 1933.

=== Storylines ===
The 86th Anniversary Show featured seven professional wrestling matches scripted by CMLL with some wrestlers involved in scripted feuds. The wrestlers portray either heels (referred to as rudos in Mexico, those that play the part of the "bad guys") or faces (técnicos in Mexico, the "good guy" characters) as they perform.

On November 20, 2018 Marcela started her fifth reign with the CMLL World Women's Championship as she defeated Dalys la Caribeña to win it, ending Dalys' reign at 983 days. During the summer of 2019 CMLL announced that they were creating the Universal Amazons Championship tournament, where the winner would get a match for the CMLL World Women's Championship. Dalys and La Metálica both qualified for the finals, which took place on August 19, 2019, and say Dalys win the tournament and earn a match against Marcela. When CMLL later announced the 86th Anniversary Show date, they also confirmed that Dalys would be given her championship match as part of the show. On September 25, 2019, on CMLL Informa, it was announced that Marcela will not be able to participate in the Anniversary Show due to an ankle injury and will be replaced by the Mexican National Women Champion La Metálica.

== Results ==
No.	Results	Stipulations	Times
1	Stigma, Audaz, and Rey Cometa defeated Misterioso Jr., Tiger, and Virus	Six-man "Lucha Libre rules" tag team match	14:02
2	Dulce Gardenia, Diamante Azul, and Titán defeated El Hijo del Villano III, Hechicero, and Rey Bucanero by disqualification	Six-man "Lucha Libre rules" tag team match	13:38
3	La Metálica (c) defeated Dalys la Caribeña	Best two-out-of-three falls match for the Mexican National Women's Championship	13:51
4	Mephisto and Los Hermanos Chávez (Ángel de Oro and Niebla Roja) defeated Soberano Jr. and Los Guerreros Lagunero (Gran Guerrero and Euforia)	Relevos increíbles Six-man "Lucha Libre rules" tag team match	11:11
5	Microman defeated Chamuel	Micro-Estrellas Lucha de Apuestas, mask vs. mask match	09:44
6	Nueva Generación Dinamita (El Cuatrero, Forastero, and Sansón) (c) defeated Carístico, Místico, and Valiente	Six-man "Lucha Libre rules" tag team match for the Mexican National Trios Championship	14:06
7	Último Guerrero defeated Negro Casas; Also in the match: Bárbaro Cavernario, Big Daddy, Ciber the Main Man, Gilbert el Boricua, and Volador Jr.	Seven-man Luchas de Apuestas, hair vs hair, Steel Cage match	13:23
(c) / – the champion(s) heading into the match

== Reception ==
In a review on Cage Side Seats it was said that the show "was an overall enjoyable event" and rated the show a "B+" overall. The top match of the night was the Micro-estrellas mask match. Richard Gallegos of the "Voices of Wrestling" had a much different opinion on the show, stating that the "CMLL 86th Aniversario was a masterclass in ineptitude." and calling it "a Worst Show of the Year Contender." but did add that "Microman and Chamuel saved the night with their fantastic Apuestas Match".
