= Guapito =

Mexican professional wrestler

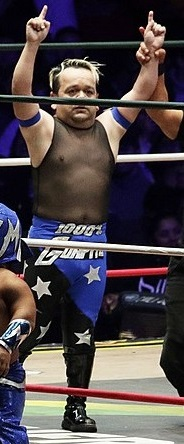
- Guapito after winning a match on November 30, 2018

Personal information
- Born: Armando Mercado García; August 27, 1981 (age 44)

Professional wrestling career
- Ring names: Madrox/Mandrox; Guapito
- Billed height: 1.25 m (4 ft 1 in)
- Debut: 2006

Armando Mercado García (born August 27, 1981) is a Mexican professional wrestler, who works under the ring name Guapito ("The Little Handsome One"). Until 2021 he worked for the Mexican Consejo Mundial de Lucha Libre (CMLL) promotion where he portrayed a face (known as a técnico in Mexico, the protagonists of professional wrestling). He was one of the original competitors in CMLL's Micro-Estrella ("Micro-Star") division where he competed with and against other wrestlers with dwarfism.

He began his career in 2006 working as the masked mascota companion Madrox, sometimes spelled Mandrox, working for AAA as part of their "Los Alienígenas" group. In 2007 he began working as Guapito ("The Little Handsome One"), playing a vain, self-obsessed "Guapo" character as he worked as a mascota for Shocker and Scorpio Jr. who portrayed similar characters. In 2017 Guapito made his debut in CMLL's Micro-Estrella division.

== Professional wrestling career ==
=== AAA (2006–2009) ===
García's first job in professional wrestling involved him playing the role of "Mandrox" (sometimes spelled "Madrox"), a masked mascota, a diminutive version of a regular-sized wrestler, for an AAA group known as "Los Alienígenas". The group consisted of Alliens, Mungo, and Kriptor along with Mandrox, all of whom wore alien inspired masks and bodysuits, essentially pretending to be extraterrestrial wrestlers, communicating mainly with clicking sounds. The group worked primarily with El Alebrije and his diminutive mascota Cuije.

In 2007, AAA began teasing that the Los Guapos VIP group would introduce a new leader to replace Shocker, who had left AAA. García was introduced by AAA under the ring name "Guapito", complete with bleach blonde hair, and expensive-looking suits as the leader/mascota of Los Guapos VIP. Guapito and Scorpio Jr. unsuccessfully challenged Cuije and El Alebrije for the AAA Mascot Tag Team Championship on December 2, 2007. In 2008 most of Los Guapos VIP (Scorpio Jr., Zumbido, and Guapito) left AAA to work on the independent circuit, but Guapito returned to AAA shortly after without any explanation. At the 2008 Guerra de Titanes show, Guapito accompanied El Brazo for a six-man steel cage match, where the last person in the cage would get his hair shaved off. The match came down to El Brazo and El Elegido when Guapito entered the cage to help out. As Elegido climbed out, El Brazo attacked Guapito, hoping to leave the diminutive Guapito in the cage to get his hair shaved off. Instead Guapito was able to climb out, forcing El Brazo to be shaved bald.

=== Independent circuit (2009–2017) ===
On September 14, 2013, as part of International Wrestling League's third anniversary show Guapito, El Gallito and Feliz lost to Chamuel. At the Federación Universal de Lucha Libre Guerra de Leyendas show the team of El Divo, El Hijo de Máscara Sagrada, Lady Apache, and Mascarita Sagrada defeated Guapito, Hator, Rossy Moreno, and Scorpio Jr.

=== Consejo Mundial de Lucha Libre (2017–2021) ===
In early 2017 CMLL hired Guapito to help establish a Micro-Estrellas ("Micro-Stars") division, featuring only wrestlers with dwarfism. The first match of the Micro-Estrellas division took place on April 30, 2017, and saw El Gallito and Microman defeat Mije and Zacarías el Perico in a special featured match, with Guapito refereeing the match. By October 2017, Guapito transitioned from being the Micro-Estrella referee to being a competitor, making his debut in the division on October 17. For the first anniversary of the Micro-Estrellas division, CMLL held an eight-micros torneo cibernético elimination match, featuring the entire active Micro-Estrella division at the time. Guapito, Microman, Átomo, and Zacarías took on Mije, Angelito, Chamuel, and El Gallito, which saw Microman pin Chamuel to win the tournament while Guapito was the fifth man eliminated from the match. The Micro-Estrellas appeared at CMLL's Leyendas Mexicanas ("Mexican Legends") supercard show where Guapito, Microman, and El Gallito defeated Mije, Chamuel and Zacarías in the second match of the night. At the 2019 Homenaje a Dos Leyendas ("Homage to two legends") show, Guapito and his team once again won.

Guapito, Zaracias, and Chamuel teamed up once again for the Arena Coliseo 76th Anniversary show, but once against lost to the trio of Átomo, Gallito, and Microman. With the popularity of the Micro-Estrellas division, CMLL introduced the CMLL World Micro-Estrellas Championship in December 2019. Guapito and five other Micro-Estrellas (Chamuel, Átomo, Gallito, Microman, and Zacarías) were involved in the elimination match to determine the first champion on December 25. Guapito was the second man eliminated, as he was pinned by El Gallito. In the end, Chamuel defeated Microman to win the championship.

Guapito wrestled his last match for CMLL in November 2021, and solidifed his free agency in February 2021 by appearing on an independent card that featured AAA luchadors (a practice disallowed under CMLL's policies). He has since had occasional AAA appearances.

== Luchas de Apuestas record ==
| Winner (wager) | Loser (wager) | Location | Event | Date | Notes |
|---|---|---|---|---|---|
| Guapito (hair) | El Brazo (hair) | Oriziba, Mexico | Guerra de Titanes | December 6, 2008 | (Note: This was a steel cage match that Guapito was not originally involved in, but at the end entered the cage to help El Brazo. El Brazo turned on his, but Guapito escaped the cage and El Brazo had his hair shaved off.) |
