= Skadi (wrestler) =

Mexican professional wrestler (born 1996)

Personal information
- Born: November 14, 1996 (age 29) Mexico City, Mexico
- Parent: Marcela (mother)

Professional wrestling career
- Ring name: Skadi
- Billed height: 5 ft 6 in (168 cm)
- Trained by: Marcela; Rey Mercurio; Virus
- Debut: April 14, 2012

Skadi (born November 14, 1996) is a Mexican professional wrestler. She works for Consejo Mundial de Lucha Libre (CMLL), where she portrays a técnica (the "good" characters, or faces) wrestling character.

Skadi is a second-generation professional wrestler, the daughter of Marcela, with whom she has also teamed up. Her real name is not a matter of public record as is often the case with masked wrestlers in Mexico.

== Professional wrestling career ==
On March 8, 2024, Skadi and Andrómeda defeated defending Mexican National Women's Tag Team Champions Las Chicas Indomables (La Jarochita and Lluvia) to win the titles.

== Championships and accomplishments ==
- Consejo Mundial de Lucha Libre

- Mexican National Women's Tag Team Championship (1 time) - with Andrómeda
- International Gran Prix De Amazonas (2026)
- Copa 82 Aniversario Arena Coliseo Cibernético
- Torneo Increibles de Amazonas (2025) - with La Metálica
