= KeMonito =

Mexican professional wrestling manager

Kemonito
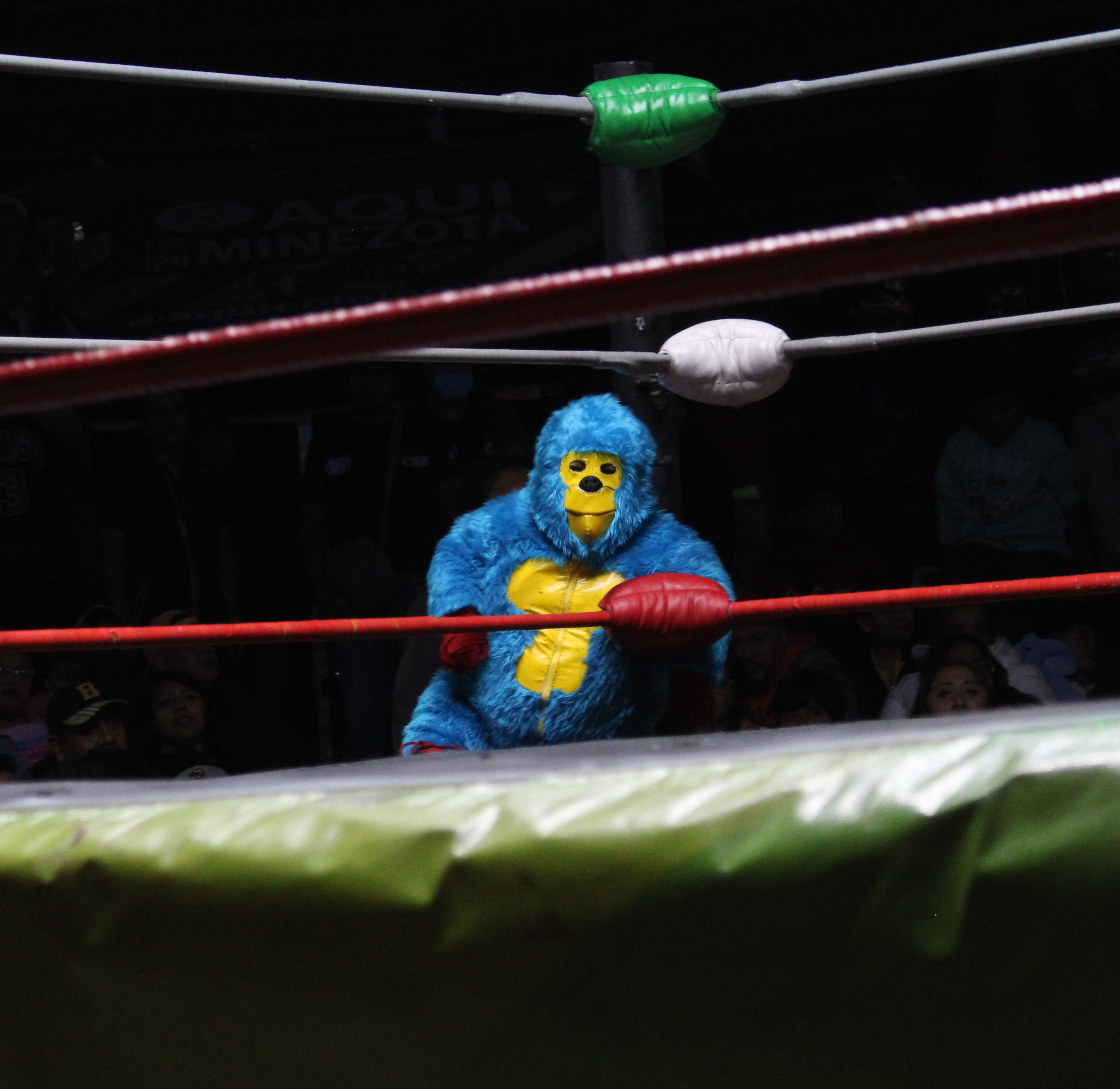
- KeMonito in January 2025

Personal information
- Born: Jesús Juárez Rosales; July 3, 1967 (age 59) Guadalajara, Jalisco, Mexico
- Children: Microman (son)

Professional wrestling career
- Ring name(s): Alushe; El Centavito; Duende Maya; KeMonito; QueMoniito
- Billed height: 0.80 m (2 ft 7 1/2 in)
- Billed weight: 45 kg (99 lb)
- Billed from: City of Anahuac, Xibalba (As Alushe)
- Trained by: Diablo Velazco
- Debut: 1988

Jesús Juárez Rosales (born July 3, 1967), better known by his ring name KeMonito, is a Mexican professional wrestling mascot. He is best known for his work with Consejo Mundial de Lucha Libre (CMLL), where he portrayed a técnico ("Good guy") wrestling character. As KeMonito, he accompanied and helped various técnicos in CMLL, a role he used to fill for Tinieblas under the name "Alushe". As KeMonito, he wore a full bodysuit that resembles that of a monkey with blue fur and yellow skin; as Alushe, he wore a furry full bodysuit resembling an Ewok. Due to his diminutive stature, he never worked as a full-time wrestler. His son, known as Microman, followed in his father's footsteps.

== Personal life ==
KeMonito was born Jesús Juárez Rosales on July 3, 1967, in Guadalajara, Jalisco, Mexico. Despite having never being unmasked, his birth name became public record, because of a legal issue between him and Consejo Mundial de Lucha Libre (CMLL). Due to his dwarfism, KeMonito only grew to 0.80 m (2 ft 7 1/2 in) tall and weight 45 kg (99 lb). His son, known as Microman, was born on September 30, 1998, and followed in his father's footsteps.

== Professional wrestling career ==
The man who would later perform as both Alushe and KeMonito was trained by Diablo Velazco, presumably for a career as a Midget professional wrestler (later referred to as a Mini-Estrella in lucha libre), but due to his diminutive stature, 0.80 m (2 ft 7 1/2 in), he never worked as a full-time wrestler.

=== Alushe (1988–2005) ===
In 1988, Tinieblas introduced a new sidekick/partner/mascota in the form of Alushe, wearing a furry full body suit including a mask that made him resemble an Ewok from Return of the Jedi. His name, image and playful character was inspired by the legend of the Alux, a Maya mythical sprite. The diminutive sidekick was added to appeal to the children in the audience and given an intricate storyline background to help sell the "mythical" nature of the Alushe creature. According to his fictional back story he is a Mayan elf born in the year 1767 in the city of Anahuac in Xibalba, the Mayan version of hell and made his debut in 1988 at the age of 221 years. Over the years, Alushe would accompany Tinieblas to the ring and in a comedic fashion play the foil to various rudo (wrestlers who portray the "bad guy" characters) opponents of Tinieblas, often in a comedic fashion. He never worked as an actual wrestler, not even when Consejo Mundial de Lucha Libre (CMLL) created the Mini-Estrellas division, choosing to remain a mascota, who would get involved in his "Masters" matches. As Alushe, he has outwitted and at times even pinned much larger opponents, feats that within the fictional world of professional wrestling were accepted even though they clearly broke the suspension of disbelief principles professional wrestling operates under. While he did not compete regularly as a wrestler, he did get involved in a Luchas de Apuestas (or "Bet match"), where all competitors would wager either their mask or their hair on the outcome of the match. On April 7, 2004, Alushe defeated a Mini-Estrella known as Pequeño Sadam (Little Sadam) and forced him to unmask. At one point Pierroth Jr.'s group Los Boricuas kidnapped Alushe and in a comedic segment, threatened to boil him in a giant pot and eat him if Tinieblas and Tinieblas Jr. did not agree to their terms. Instead of boiling him, realizing he would probably not smell or taste good, Pierroth offered Alushe women, candy, and money to join his team as long as he swore allegiance to Puerto Rico. He took the offer and for a short while joined Los Boricuas, wearing Puerto Rican inspired clothes as he helped the rudo team cheat. The storyline did not last long as Alushe was back by Tinieblas' side with no explanation a short while later. In 2005, Tinieblas and Alushe had a falling out and Tinieblas gave the costume and name to someone else. The replacement did not prove as successful as the original Alushe, nor have the same longevity as Tinieblas started a search for a new Alushe in 2010.

=== KeMonito (2005–2023) ===
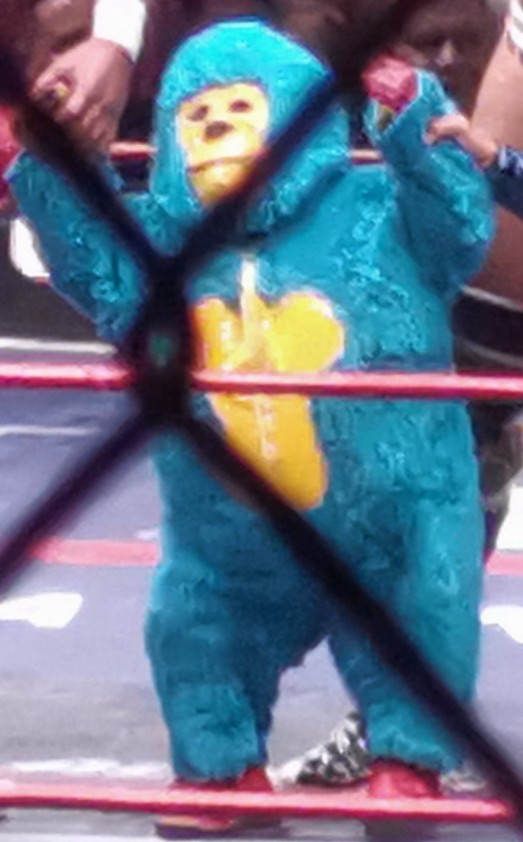
KeMonito in June 2022

The mascota who had been known as Alushe up until 2005 was given a new ring name and costume by CMLL when Tinieblas took the original name and costume away from him, coming up with the name "Qué Monito" (Spanish for "That Little Monkey" and slang for "How Cute"), later it would morph into, "K-Monito" and then finally "Ke Monito" or "KeMonito". He was given a new costume, a bodysuit resembling a fuzzy blue chimpanzee or gorilla. As KeMonito, he accompanied a number of CMLL's mid and top level técnicos to the ring to help counter act any cheating their opponents may resort to. In this role, he was known for his association with Shocker, Místico and Atlantis. Over the years, he became a constant thorn in the side of the group Los Guerreros del Infierno, especially their leader Último Guerrero, who took great pleasure in throwing the diminutive KeMonito around the ring, even at times kicking him off the ring apron to the floor. Los Guerreros del Infierno even introduced their own "Evil KeMonito" called Ultimonito who would fight KeMonito. In 2010, popular Lucha Libre AAA World Wide (AAA) mascota Cuije joined CMLL as part of Los Invasores and started a feud with KeMonito. Cuije would later change his name to Mije due to a name dispute with AAA. In 2011, CMLL introduced another mascota as La Peste Negra ("The Black Plague") added the mascota Zacarías, a little person in a parrot costume. Over time, the three CMLL mascotas have developed a long running rivalry between each other and brawls between any of the mascotas usually draws a loud reaction from the crowd.

Towards the end of the 2010s, KeMonito considered retirement, owing to health issues. However, he has claimed that he was persuaded by higher-ups in the promotion to continue performing as the mascota. During the COVID-19 pandemic, KeMonito had become the focus of viral memes; his image was used by Grupo Bimbo, and he alleges that CMLL pocketed the money that he was owed from the advertising campaign. Additionally, CMLL did not use him in their empty arena shows and KeMonito claims that the promotion reduced his pay when he returned. By 2023, KeMonito publicly spoke of retiring, with the intention of doing so at the CMLL 90th Anniversary Show. Privately, CMLL were not against this, but had preferred him to have retired quietly, as they wanted the KeMonito character to be timeless. CMLL would later introduce a new mascota character named "KeMalito", who was meant to be a new rival for KeMonito. Around this time, KeMonito had not appeared on a show in months, and he knew that it was likely that he would be replaced by another Mini-Estrella. In September 2023, KeMonito, while also revealing his birth name, filed a lawsuit to CMLL over non-payment, labor abuse, and even discrimination due to his condition. The promotion claimed they have the rights of the KeMonito character. Soon afterwards, KeMonito held a press conference and announced that he had left the promotion. A year later, CMLL began a storyline between KeMonito and KeMalito. This KeMonito is a Mini-Estrella formerly known as Chaneque, but the promotion still refers to him as the original, despite the successor being taller, more agile and wearing a different costume compared to KeMonito.

=== QueMoniito (2023–present) ===
In 2023, Juárez adopted the ring name "QueMoniito", an altered spelling of the original name of KeMonito, and began working on the Mexican independent circuit. He primarily does autograph signings and sells merchandise based on his image.

== In popular culture ==
The Alushe character often appeared on a television show called The Adventures of Capulina, often defending Capulina against various enemies. Alushe and Tinieblas also appeared on the television show Burbujas ("Bubbles") where they defeated Ecoloco, the show's antihero character.

KeMonito was the subject of a short documentary film entitled KeMonito: La última caída ("KeMonito: The Final Fall"), released in 2023.

=== Meme ===
KeMonito became part of an internet meme in the second part of the 2010s, growing in popularity right into 2020, where people would edit KeMonito into various pictures, especially scenes from films such as Once Upon a Time in Hollywood, Forrest Gump or Back to the Future. Another subject of the KeMonito Memes is to insert him into sports scenes, such as diving onto an association football player, or where the blue furry KeMonito replaces the trophy during a victory celebration. Some memes incorporate a video of KeMonito being kicked out of the wrestling ring by Último Guerrero, sending him flying to the floor, often with the comment that KeMonito represented the meme poster and Guerrero representing life, kicking them hard. The memes even celebrated KeMonito's birthday on March 4, even though his actual birthdate is July 3.

== Luchas de Apuestas record ==
Winner (wager)	Loser (wager)	Location	Event	Date	Notes
Alushe (mask)	Pequeño Sadam (mask)	Nuevo Laredo, Tamaulipas	Live event	April 7, 2003	
