= Zacarías el Perico =

Mexican professional wrestler

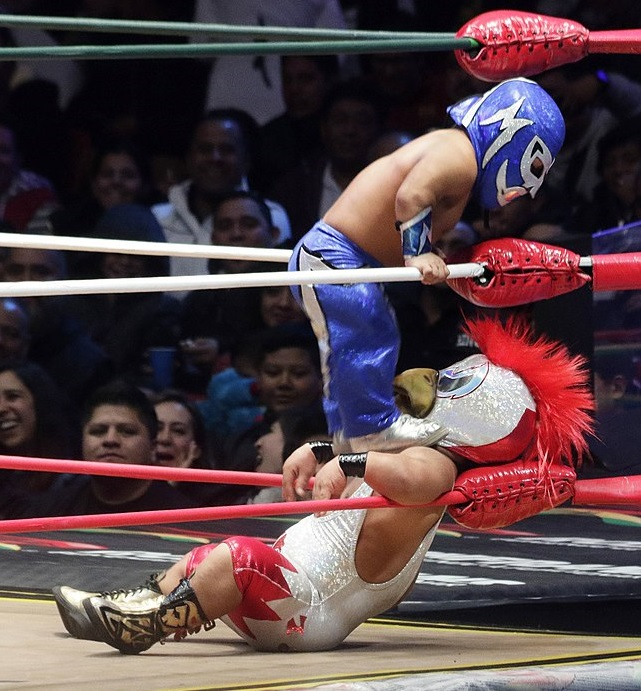
- Zacarías el Perico, on the ground, with Microman standing on his chest

Personal information
- Born: 1989 (age 36–37) Gómez Palacio, Durango, Mexico

Professional wrestling career
- Ring names: Atomo; KeMorito; Mini Máximo / Pequeño Maximo'; Perico; Ultimonito; Zacarías
- Billed height: 1.14 m (3 ft 9 in)
- Debut: 2007

Zacarías el Perico, sometimes just referred to as Zacarías, is a Mexican professional wrestler who works for the Mexican promotion Consejo Mundial de Lucha Libre (CMLL) in their Micro-Estrellas division. He was initially a maskek mascot of the La Peste Negra group, helping them cheat against their opponents, but transitioned to a full-time Micro-Estrella wrestler in April 2017.

For years he worked under dual identities as he also performed for CMLL under the name Mini Máximo/Pequeño Maximo, a smaller version of Máximo, but transitioned to working solely as Zacarías in 2012. As Mini Máximo he portrayed a face (called a técnico in Mexico, the protagonists of wrestling) wrestling character, while Zacarías is a heel (A rudo, the antagonists in wrestling) wrestling character.

== Professional wrestling career ==
The wrestler later known as Zacarías started his professional wrestling career in 2007, working under the ring name KeMorito, an "evil version" of Consejo Mundial de Lucha Libre (CMLL) Mini-Estrella Mascota KeMonito. He would later begin working for CMLL as "Ultimonito", a deliberate imitation of KeMonito as he would help Los Guerreros del Infierno as they went out of their way to punish the tecnico ("Good guy") KeMonito. Tzuki had originally played the role, but by mid-2007 CMLL needed someone else to play the part. After the Ultimonito character was abandoned he worked as a regular Mini-Estrella under the name "Atomo", although due to his very short stature did not work frequently as an active competitor.

=== Mini Máximo (2008–2012) ===
He returned in 2008 under a new ring character, reintroduced as "Mini Máximo", sometimes referred to as "Pequeño Maximo", a mini version of the exótico professional wrestler character Máximo, imitating the real Maximo down to the bright pink hair and effeminate mannerisms during matches. Maximo was only associated with Mini Máximo for a brief period of time, enough to introduce him, after which CMLL kept the two characters separated. in December 2008, Mini Máximo won his first Lucha de Apuestas, or "bet match" defeating La Novia de Chucky ("The Bride of Chucky", a male masked wrestler) and forcing his opponent to remove his mask per match stipulation. He was 1 of 16 Mini-Estrellas to compete in a 2011 Ruleta de la Muerte torneo, ("Roulette of Death tournament"). In a Ruleta de la Muerte tag teams face off in a single-elimination tournament, but unlike traditional "winner advances" events, it is the losing team that advances in this case. The due that loses the tag team match final must immediately wrestle against each other in a Lucha de Apuestas match, where either their mask or their hair is on the line. Mini Máximo teamed up with Pequeño Halcón in the fight to keep their mask or hair (in Mini Máximo's case) safe. In the first round, they defeated the team of CMLL World Mini-Estrella Champion Pequeño Olímpico and Shockercito, protecting their mask and hair.

=== Zacarías (2011–present) ===
==== La Peste Negra (2011–2017) ====
In 2011, the professional wrestling group La Peste Negra ("The Black Plague"), consisting of Negro Casas, Mr. Niebla, and El Felino, added Rey Bucanero ("King Buccaneer") to their group when Mr. Niebla was injured. When he teamed with La Peste Negra, Bucanero wore ring gear that looked more like Jack Sparrow from the Pirates of the Caribbean film series than he usually did. He also introduced a mascota corner-man, a little person wearing a fabric parrot mask, and a feathered full-body suit making him appear as an anthropomorphic parrot. The mascota was initially called "Perico" (Spanish for parakeet) and would accompany members of La Peste Negra to the ring occasionally helped them cheat during matches. Later, Rey Bucanero would leave the group when Mr. Niebla returned but Perico remained with La Peste Negra as the comedic parrot character suited La Peste Negra better. Later he changed his name to Zacarías, at times referred to as Perico Zacarías. Over time, Zacarías has developed a long-running rivalry with fellow Mini mascotas Mije and KeMonito, and brawls between any of the Mascotas usually drew a loud reaction from the crowd.

==== Micro-Estrella division (2017–present) ====
In early 2017 CMLL recruited Zacarías and fellow mascota Mije to help establish a Micro-Estrellas ("Micro-Stars") division, featuring only wrestlers with dwarfism. The first match of the Micro-Estrellas division took place on April 30, 2017, and saw Microman and El Gallito defeat Mije and Zacarías in a special featured match. For the first anniversary of the Micro-Estrellas division, CMLL held an eight-micros torneo cibernetico elimination match, featuring the entire active Micro-Estrella division at the time. Zacarías, Microman, Atomo, and Guapito took on Mije, Angelito, Chamuel, and El Gallito take on, and Zacarías. In the end, Microman pinned Chamuel to win the tournament. For the 2018 Día de Muertos ("Day of the Dead") supercard show Zacarías, Mije, and Chamuel lost to Microman, Atomo, and El Gallito, two falls to one. Four weeks later the Micro-Estrellas also appeared at CMLL's Leyendas Mexicanas ("Mexican Legends") show where Zacarías, Mije, and Chamuel lost to Microman, El Gallito and Guapito in the second match of the night. At the 2019 Homenaje a Dos Leyendas ("Homage to two legends") show Zacarías and his team once again lost to Microman's team.

Zaracias, Chamuel, and Guapito joined forces once again for the Arena Coliseo 76th Anniversary show, but once against lost to the trio of Atomo, Gallito, and Microman. With the popularity of the Micro-Estrellas division, CMLL introduced the CMLL World Micro-Estrellas Championship in December 2019. Zacarías and five other Micro-Estrellas (Chamuel, Átomo, Gallito, Guapito, and Microman) were involved in the elimination match to determine the first champion on December 25. Zacarías pinned and eliminated Átomo, but was later eliminated himself by Microman. In the end, Chamuel pinned Microman to win the championship.

=== Independent circuit (2017–present) ===
While working for CMLL, Zacarías, like all CMLL workers, is allowed to take independent circuit bookings on days he is not needed by CMLL. His independent circuit appearances usually see him team with, and face off against, other CMLL Micro-Estrellas. On June 14, 2017, at a Promociones El Cholo show in Tijuana, Baja California, Mije and Zacarías lost to Microman and El Gallito by disqualification. On September 15, 2018, Chamuel and Zacarías lost to Microman and Gallito in a match at the Benito Juarez ExpoMuseo in Mexico City. The Micro-Estrellas also competed at Desastre Total Ultraviolento's 11th Anniversary Show, which saw Microman and Gallito defeating Mije and Zacarías. They also made a special appearance for The Crash Lucha Libre, one of Mexico's largest independent promotions, with Microman and Gallito once again defeating Chamuel and Zacarías in their March 2, 2019 match. For the 2020 Homenaje a Mr. Niebla show on January 4, 2020, Zacarías, dressed like the recently deceased Mr. Niebla, defeated Microman in a singles match.

== Reception ==
Súper Luchas magazine described the Micro-Estrellas division debut match between Microman and El Gallito vs. Mije and Zacarías, as "an encounter with a fall that literally stole the night."

== Luchas de Apuestas record ==
Winner (wager)	Loser (wager)	Location	Event	Date	Notes
Mini Máximo (hair)	La Novia de Chucky (mask)	Gómez Palacio, Durango	Live event	December 2008	

== See also ==
- List of exóticos
