= Microman (wrestler) =

Mexican professional wrestler

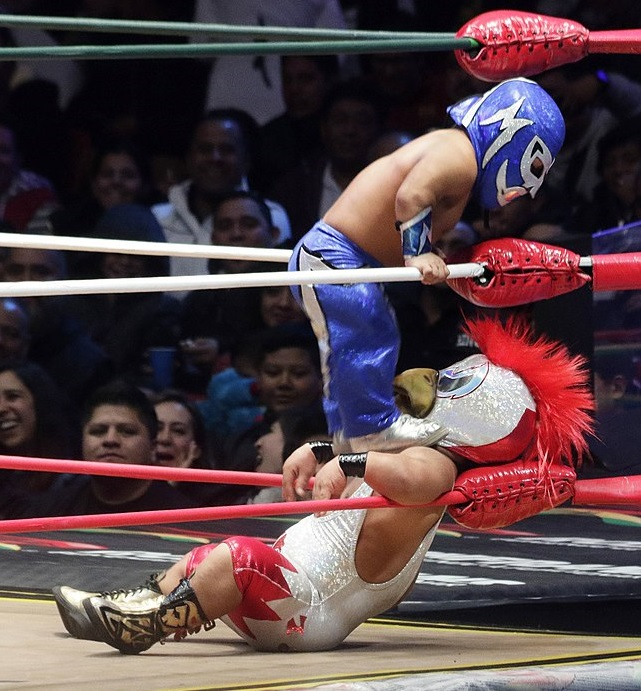
- Microman (in blue) standing on the chest of Zacarías el Perico during a match

Personal information
- Born: Unrevealed (Note: Traditionally Mexican sources will not report on the birth name of a masked wrestler who has never been unmasked in the ring.); September 30, 1998 (age 27) Mexico City, Mexico
- Parent: KeMonito (father)

Professional wrestling career
- Ring names: Micro Man; Microman
- Billed height: 1.0 m (3 ft 3 in)
- Billed weight: 28 kg (62 lb)
- Trained by: Último Guerrero; Virus
- Debut: April 30, 2017

Microman (also stylized as Micro Man; born September 30, 1998) is the ring name of a Mexican professional wrestler, who is currently under contract with Mexican promotion Lucha Libre AAA Worldwide (AAA). He also wrestles on the independent circuit.

He previously worked for the Mexican professional wrestling promotion Consejo Mundial de Lucha Libre (CMLL). Microman has dwarfism and competed in CMLL's little people-exclusive Micro-Estrellas ("Micro Stars") division. He has also wrestled for Game Changer Wrestling (GCW) and Major League Wrestling (MLW). He is the son of KeMonito, also a little person, who works as a mascota in CMLL. His real name is not a matter of public record, as is often the case with masked wrestlers in Mexico, where their private lives are kept concealed from professional wrestling fans.

Microman's debut on April 30, 2017, also marked the debut of the CMLL Micro-Estrellas division, with Microman being one of the featured performers in the group of little people. He won his first Lucha de Apuestas, mask vs, mask match, at the CMLL 86th Anniversary Show when he defeated and unmasked Chamuel. During his initial training CMLL wanted him to work as a mascota, but he insisted that he wanted to wrestle despite his diminutive stature of 1 m (3 ft 3 1/2 in).

== Personal life ==
Microman was born on September 30, 1998, in Mexico City, Mexico, the son of professional wrestling mascota KeMonito (Jesús Juárez Rosales). Growing up he idolized Mascarita Dorada, who, unlike his father, was an active professional wrestler, despite his dwarfism. During his childhood he would watch as his 0.8 m (2 ft 7 1/2 in) tall father was thrown around by average-sized wrestlers and the toll it took on his body, making him decide that he did not want to be a mascota.

He initially studied computer science in school but stopped to begin training for a professional wrestling career. When he was old enough to start training Microman asked his father for permission to train to be a wrestler, which in turn led KeMonito to ask his longtime friend Último Guerrero, head trainer at CMLL's wrestling school, to train his son. Guerrero initially expressed concerns as there were no other similarly sized wrestlers training at the school at that time. After being convinced of Microman's dedication he finally agreed to train him for an in-ring career.

== Professional wrestling career ==
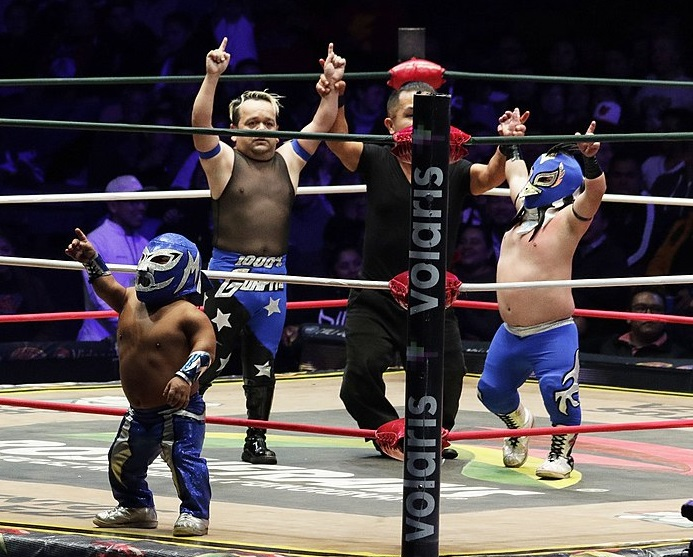
Microman (in front) along with Guapito (back, left) and El Gallito (back, right) after winning a match

=== Consejo Mundial de Lucha Libre (2017–2021) ===
At the time Microman completed his training CMLL did not have any other active little people wrestlers, but decided to have several of their mascotas as well as little people wrestlers from the independent circuit, join a newly created "Micro-Estrellas" (Micro Stars) division. Microman and El Gallito defeated Zacarías el Perico and Cuije in the first-ever Micro-Estrellas match at one of CMLL's "Kids' day" shows. As part of the division, CMLL also hired a Micro-Estrella referee. While most matches in CMLL were best-two-out-of-three falls matches, the early Micro-Estrella matches were one fall, but later moved to the traditional two-out-of-three falls format. Microman and the Micro-Estrellas would appear on various CMLL shows, as well as make special appearances on the Mexican independent circuit, such as The Crash Lucha Libre, Promociones El Cholo, or Desastre Total Ultraviolento. At 1.00 m (3 ft 3 1/2 in) tall, Microman was the shortest wrestler in Mexico when he made his debut.

For the first anniversary of the Micro-Estrellas division, CMLL held an eight-micros torneo cibernetico elimination match, featuring the entire active Micro-Estrella division at the time. Microman teamed up with Atomo, Guapito, and Zacarías to take on Angelito, Chamuel, El Gallito, and Mije. In the end Microman pinned Chamuel to win the tournament. Following the anniversary Microman and Chamuel began a long-running storyline feud, which often saw Chamuel either tear Microman's mask open or steal it during a match. The Micro-Estrellas made their debut at a major CMLL show on November 11, 2018, when Microman, Atomo, and Gallito defeated Chamuel, Mije, and Zacarías two falls to one on the Día de Muertos show. The Microman/Chamuel feud led to the first one-on-one match in the Micro division on August 30, 2019, as part of CMLL's International Gran Prix. The match ended in a disqualification as Chamuel was disqualified for throwing his mask to Microman in an attempt to fool the referee. The feud between the two led to a Lucha de Apuestas, mask vs. mask match, between the two as part of the CMLL 86th Anniversary Show. The match was the first time in 32 years that two "Micros" had a Lucha de Apuestas match. Microman won the third and deciding fall, forcing Chamuel to unmask and reveal his real name per lucha libre traditions. With the success of the Micro-Estrellas, CMLL introduced the CMLL World Micro-Estrellas Championship in December 2019. Microman and five other Micro-Estrellas (Chamuel, Atomo, Gallito, Guapito, and Zacarías) were involved in the elimination match to determine the first champion on December 25. In the end Chamuel pinned Microman to eliminate him and win the championship. At the CMLL 87th Anniversary Show on September 25, 2020, Microman unsuccessfully challenged Chamuel for the championship. In November 2021, Microman announced his departure from CMLL.

=== Independent circuit (2017–present) ===
While working for CMLL, Microman, like all CMLL workers, was allowed to take independent circuit bookings on days he was not needed by CMLL. Microman's independent circuit appearances usually saw him team with and face off against other CMLL Micro-Estrellas. His first non-CMLL match was on June 14, 2017, at a Promociones El Cholo show in Tijuana, Baja California which saw Microman and El Gallito defeat Mije and Zacarías by disqualification. On September 15, 2018, Microman, and Gallito defeated Chamuel and Zacarías in a match at the Benito Juarez ExpoMuseo in Mexico City. The Micro-Estrellas also competed at Desastre Total Ultraviolento's 11th Anniversary Show, which featured Microman and Gallito defeating Mije and Zacarías. They also made a special appearance for The Crash Lucha Libre, one of Mexico's largest independent promotions, with Microman and Gallito once again defeating Chamuel and Zacarías in their March 2, 2019 match. For the 2020 Homenaje a Mr. Niebla show on January 4, 2020, Zacarías, dressed like the recently deceased Mr. Niebla, defeated Microman.

=== Major League Wrestling (2022–2023) ===
In February 2022, Microman signed with Major League Wrestling (MLW), making his debut on the February 24 episode of Fusion, where he teamed with Aramis and El Dragon to defeat Arez, Gino Medina and Mini Abismo Negro. At Battle Riot IV on June 23 (aired November 3) Microman entered the 40-man Battle Riot match for a future MLW World Heavyweight Championship match, which was won by Jacob Fatu. He also failed to win the following year's edition of the match on the April 25, 2023 episode of MLW Underground Wrestling.

=== Game Changer Wrestling (2024–2025) ===
Microman made his debut for Game Changer Wrestling (GCW) in a seven-way scramble match at No Compadre on January 12, 2024, which was won by Shane Mercer. The next night, at 56 Birdz, he unsuccessfully challenged Joey Janela for the GCW Extreme Championship. He received his first victory at Feel No Ways on February 4, defeating Mini Abismo Negro. On April 6, at Joey Janela's Spring Break: Clusterfuck Forever, Microman won the Clusterfuck Battle Royal by last eliminating Nick Gage. He competed in a Gauntlet of Survival match for the GCW World Championship at Cage of Survival 3 on June 2, where he eliminated John Wayne Murdoch, before being eliminated by Mercer. At No Compadre on March 29, 2025, Microman unsuccessfully challenged Effy for the title what it final appearances on the promotion.

== Reception ==
Microman was voted the first runner up for the 2017 Wrestling Observer Newsletter Rookie of the Year award, second to only Katsuya Kitamura. While the CMLL 86th Anniversary Show in general was given mediocre reviews the match between Microman and Chamuel was well received. Richard Gallegos of the Voices of Wrestling stated that "Microman and Chamuel saved the night with their fantastic Apuestas Match", and a Cageside Seats review named the match the "match of the night". CBS News described Microman as the "pequeña gran estrella de la Lucha Libre", or "Little big star of professional wrestling" in a 2018 article. Súper Luchas magazine described his, and the Micro Estrellas debut, as "an encounter with a fall that literally stole the night."

== Championships and accomplishments ==
- Consejo Mundial de Lucha Libre

- Primero Aniversario de Micro-Estrella torneo cibernetico

- Lucha Libre AAA Worldwide
  - Copa Triplemanía XXX: Monterrey
- Game Changer Wrestling
  - Clusterfuck Battle Royal (2024)
- Pro Wrestling Illustrated
  - Ranked No. 396 of the top 500 singles wrestlers in the PWI 500 in 2024

== Luchas de Apuestas record ==
Winner (wager)	Loser (wager)	Location	Event	Date	Notes
Microman (mask)	Chamuel (mask)	Mexico City, Mexico	CMLL 86th Anniversary Show	September 27, 2019	
Microman (MLW career)	Gino Medina (MLW career)	Norcross, Georgia	MLW Super Series	September 18, 2022	(Note: This was a six-man tag team Loser Leaves Town match where Microman was teamed with Laredo Kid and Komander and Medina was teamed with Mini Abismo Negro and Taurus. Since Microman pinned Medina, Medina was forced to leave MLW; had Microman been pinned or submitted, he would have been forced to leave.)
Microman (mask)	Danhausen (mask)	Dallas, Texas	GCW Crime Wave	June 29, 2024	
