= Homenaje a Dos Leyendas (2019) =

2019 Consejo Mundial de Lucha Libre event

- Official poster for the 2019 Homenaje a Dos Leyendas show
- Promotion: Consejo Mundial de Lucha Libre
- Date: March 15, 2019
- City: Mexico City, Mexico
- Venue: Arena México

Pay-per-view chronology
← Previous; Universal Championship	Next → Torneo Nacional de Parejas Increíbles

Homenaje a Dos Leyendas chronology
← Previous; 2018	Next → 2020

Homenaje a Dos Leyendas (2019) (Spanish for "Homage to Two Legends") is a major professional wrestling supercard event, produced and scripted by Consejo Mundial de Lucha Libre (CMLL; Spanish for "World Wrestling Council") that took place on March 15, 2019. The show, like all of CMLL's major shows took place in Arena México, Mexico City, Mexico, CMLL's home venue. The event was to honor and remember CMLL founder Salvador Lutteroth, who died in March 1987. Starting in 1999 CMLL honored not just their founder during the show, but also a second lucha libre legend, making it their version of a Hall of Fame event. For the 2019 show CMLL commemorated the life and career of wrestler Blue Demon. This was the 21st March show held under the Homenaje a Dos Leyendas name, having previously been known as Homenaje a Salvador Lutteroth from 1996 to 1998.

The main event of the show was a tag team Lucha de Apuestas, or bet match, where Los Hermanos Chavez (Ángel de Oro and Niebla Roja) defeated Los Ingobernables (El Terrible and La Bestia del Ring), which meant that both Los Ingobernables members had to have all their hair shaved off while standing in the middle of the ring. In the semi-main event CMLL World Trios Champions Los Guerreros Laguneros (Euforia, Gran Guerrero and Último Guerrero) retained the championship against the team of Carístico, Dragon Lee and Volador Jr. The undercard featured four Six-man "Lucha Libre rules" tag team matches, including micro-estrella division competitors Átomo, El Gallito and Microman defeated Chamuel, Mije and Zacarias el Perico.

== Production ==
=== Background ===
Since 1996 the Mexican wrestling company Consejo Mundial de Lucha Libre (Spanish for "World Wrestling Council"; CMLL) has held a show in March each year to commemorate the passing of CMLL founder Salvador Lutteroth who died in March 1987. For the first three years the show paid homage to Lutteroth himself, from 1999 through 2004 the show paid homage to Lutteroth and El Santo, Mexico's most famous wrestler ever and from 2005 forward the show has paid homage to Lutteroth and a different leyenda ("Legend") each year, celebrating the career and accomplishments of past CMLL stars. Originally billed as Homenaje a Salvador Lutteroth, it has been held under the Homenaje a Dos Leyendas ("Homage to two legends") since 1999 and is the only show outside of CMLL's Anniversary shows that CMLL has presented every year since its inception. All Homenaje a Dos Leyendas shows have been held in Arena México in Mexico City, Mexico, which is CMLL's main venue, its "home". Traditionally CMLL holds their major events on Friday Nights, which means the Homenaje a Dos Leyendas shows replace their regularly scheduled Super Viernes show. The 2019 show will be the 25th overall a Homenaje a Dos Leyendas show produced by CMLL.

=== Storylines ===
The Homenaje a Dos Leyendas show featured six professional wrestling matches with different wrestlers involved in pre-existing scripted feuds, plots and storylines. Wrestlers were portrayed as either heels (referred to as rudos in Mexico, those that portray the "bad guys") or faces (técnicos in Mexico, the "good guy" characters) as they followed a series of tension-building events, which culminated in a wrestling match or series of matches.

The storyline that led to the main event of the 2019 Homenaje a Dos Leyendas show started during the 2019 Universal Championship tournament. Both Niebla Roja and El Terrible won their tournament block and faced off in the finals on February 15, 2019. For the match Niebla Roja had his brother, Ángel de Oro, in his corner while La Bestia del Ring from Los Ingobernables accompanied Terrible for the match. During the match La Bestia helped El Terrible defeat Niebla Roja, leaving to all four wrestlers fighting after the match. On February 19 it was announced that Los Hermanos Chavez (Ángel and Roja) would face El Terrible and La Bestia del Ring in the main event of the 2019 Homenaje a Dos Leyendas show, where both teams would "bet" their hair in a Lucha de Apuestas match.

=== Homage to Salvador Lutteroth and Blue Demon ===
In September 1933 Salvador Lutteroth González founded Empresa Mexicana de Lucha Libre (EMLL), which would later be renamed Consejo Mundial de Lucha Libre. Over time Lutteroth would become responsible for building both Arena Coliseo in Mexico City and Arena Mexico, which became known as "The Cathedral of Lucha Libre". Over time EMLL became the oldest wrestling promotion in the world, with 2018 marking the 85th year of its existence. Lutteroth has often been credited with being the "father of Lucha Libre" introducing the concept of masked wrestlers to Mexico as well as the Luchas de Apuestas match. Lutteroth died on September 5, 1987. EMLL, late CMLL, remained under the ownership and control of the Lutteroth family as first Salvador's son Chavo Lutteroth and later his grandson Paco Alonso took over ownership of the company.

The life and achievements of Salvador Lutteroth is always honored at the annual Homenaje a Dos Leyenda' show and since 1999 CMLL has also honored a second person, a Leyenda of lucha libre, in some ways CMLL's version of their Hall of Fame. For the 2019 show, CMLL will honor the life and career of Blue Demon as well. Blue Demon, real name Alejandro Muñoz Moreno (April 24, 1922 – December 16, 2000), was one of the most popular and well-known names in the golden age of Lucha Libre as well as Lucha films, considered one of the "big three" of the golden age (the other two being El Santo and Mil Máscaras) and an icon of lucha libre. During his 41-year career, Blue Demon won a number of championships, including the Mexican National Tag Team Championship with Black Shadow, the Mexican National Welterweight Championship three times, and the NWA World Welterweight Championship twice. He was also part of the Class of 1996 inductees in the Wrestling Observer Newsletter Hall of Fame. Muñoz' adopted son made his debut as Blue Demon Jr. in 1985, continuing the legacy. CMLL holds a Leyenda de Azul tournament on a semi-regular basis in honor of Blue Demon, with the most recent taking place in 2017. His movie career began in 1961 with La Furia del Ring (The Fury of the Ring) and spanned until 1970 where he starred in Misterio en las Bermudas (Mystery in Bermuda). He would later also be the focus of a 1989 documentary called Blue Demon, el Campeón (Blue Demon, The Champion).

== Matches ==
No.	Results	Stipulations
1	Vangellys, Pólvora, and El Hijo del Villano III defeated Audaz and La Excelencia Tapatia (Tritón and Esfinge)	Six-man "Lucha Libre rules" tag team match
2	Átomo, El Gallito and Microman defeated Chamuel, Mije and Zacarias el Perico	Six-man "Lucha Libre rules" tag team match
3	Diamante Azul, Titán, and El Soberano defeated Los Hijos del Infierno (Mephisto and Ephesto), and Templario	Six-man "Lucha Libre rules" tag team match
4	Nueva Generacion Dinamitas (Sansón, El Cuatrero, and Forastero) defeated La Peste Negra (Negro Casas and Bárbaro Cavernario) and Gilbert el Boricua	Six-man "Lucha Libre rules" tag team match
5	Los Guerreros Laguneros (Euforia, Gran Guerrero and Último Guerrero) (c) defeated Carístico, Dragon Lee and Volador Jr.	Six-man "Lucha Libre rules" tag team match for the CMLL World Trios Championship
6	Los Hermano Chavez (Ángel de Oro and Niebla Roja) defeated Los Ingobernables (El Terrible and La Bestia del Ring)	Best two-out-of-three falls Lucha de Apuestas, hair vs. hair match
(c) / – the champion(s) heading into the match
