= Fantastica Mania 2020 =

Japanese/Mexican professional wrestling show series

- Poster for the tour
- Promotions: Consejo Mundial de Lucha Libre; New Japan Pro-Wrestling
- Date: January 10, 2020; January 11, 2020; January 12, 2020; January 13, 2020; January 16, 2020; January 17, 2020; January 19, 2020; January 20, 2020
- City: Osaka; Ehime; Kyoto; Aichi; Tokyo; Tokyo; Tokyo; Tokyo
- Venue: Edion Arena Osaka; Item Ehime; KBS Hall; Nagyoa Congress Center event hall; Korakuen Hall; Korakuen Hall; Korakuen Hall; Korakuen Hall
- Attendance: 1,052 (Jan 10); 931 (Jan 11); 781 (Jan 12); 1,534 (Jan 13); 1,423 (Jan 16); 1,534 (Jan 17); 1,601 (Jan 19); 1,593 (Jan 20)

Event chronology
← Previous; 2019	Next → 2023

Consejo Mundial de Lucha Libre event chronology
← Previous; Sin Piedad	Next → Reyes del Aire

New Japan Pro-Wrestling event chronology
← Previous; New Year Dash!!	Next → The New Beginning USA; The New Beginning in Sapporo

Fantastica Mania 2020 was a professional wrestling show tour, scripted and co-produced by the Japanese New Japan Pro-Wrestling (NJPW) promotion and the Mexican Consejo Mundial de Lucha Libre (CMLL) promotion. The tour started on January 10 and ran until January 21, 2020, with shows taking place in Osaka, Ehime, Kyoto, Aichi, and four shows in Tokyo at Korakuen Hall.

The 2020 tour was the tenth year in a row that NJPW and CMLL has co-promoted shows in Japan under the Fantastica Mania name. With a total of eight shows, the tour tied the 2018 tour and the 2019 tour as the longest in Fantastica Mania history. Select events were shown on Fighting TV Samurai and TV Asahi, or live on NJPW World with subsequent video-on-demand options.

== Background ==
The 2020 Fantastica Mania tour was the tenth year in a row where Japanese wrestling promotion New Japan Pro-Wrestling (NJPW) promoted a series of shows with their Mexican partner promotion Consejo Mundial de Lucha Libre (CMLL). Due to the co-promotional nature of the shows, they rarely feature any development in ongoing NJPW or CMLL storylines, instead the shows generally focus on inter-promotional matches between CMLL and NJPW.

The 2020 tour included 8 shows, the same as the 2019 tour. Starting on Friday January 11 in Osaka at the Edion Arena Osaka, the show then runs through Ehime (January 12), Kyoto (January 13), Aichi (January 16) and four shows in Tokyo at the Korakuen Hall (January 17, 19, 20 and 21). The shows from Korakuen Hall were streamed live on NJPW World.

== Storylines ==
Each of the 2020 Fantastica Mania shows features a number of professional wrestling matches scripted by CMLL and NJPW with some wrestlers involved in scripted feuds. Wrestlers portray either heels (referred to as rudos in Mexico, those that play the part of the "bad guys") or faces (técnicos in Mexico, the "good guy" characters) as they perform.

The CMLL participants for the 2020 tour were announced on October 16, 2019, and included:

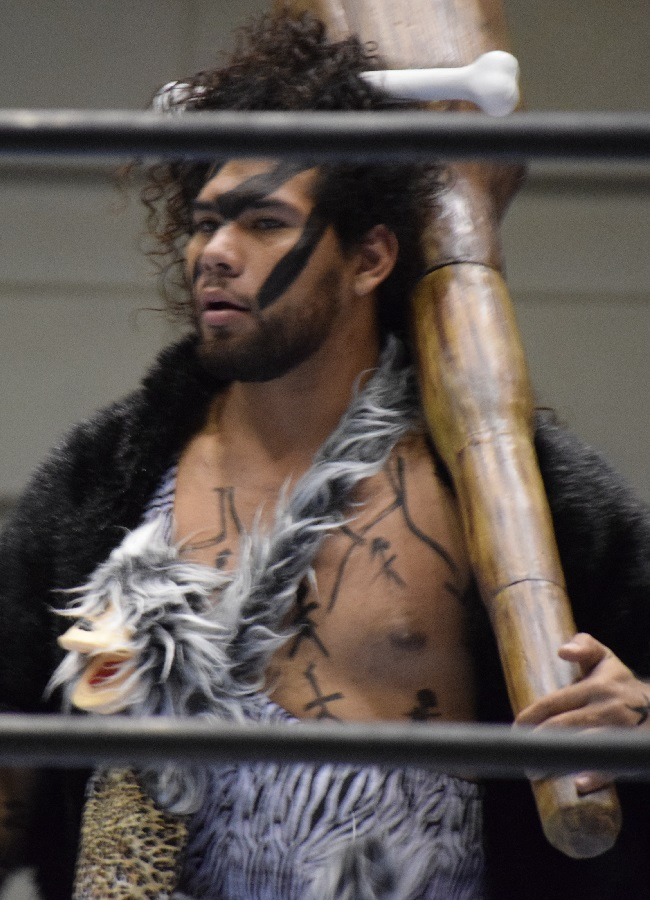
Bárbaro Cavernario during the 2017 Fantastica Mania tour.

Rank	# of tours	Show(s)
Ángel de Oro	3	2019 2018 2015
Audaz	1	2019
Bárbaro Cavernario	5	2019 2018 2017 2016 2015
Carístico	2	2019 2011
Negro Casas	0	
El Cuatrero	2	2019 2018
Dulce Gardenia	0	
Euforia	2	2017 2013
Forastero	1	2019
Flyer	1	2019
Fuego	3	2018 2016 2014
Guerrero Maya Jr.	1	2016
Luciferno	0	
Niebla Roja	2	2018 2014
Okumura	9	2019 2018 2017 2016 2015 2014 2013 2012 2011
Sansón	2	2019 2018
Soberano Jr.	3	2019 2018 2017
Stuka Jr.	4	2017 2016 2015 2014
Tiger	0	
Titán	5	2019 2017 2016 2014 2013
Último Guerrero	6	2019 2018 2017 2016 2015 2014

The 2020 tour marked the Fantasticamania debut for CMLL wrestlers Negro Casas, Dulce Gardenia, Lucifierno and Tiger. Casas was originally scheduled for the 2018 tour but had to miss it due to injury. For the first time in six years neither Volador Jr. nor Místico participated in the tour. Okumura is the only wrestler to participate in every Fantastica Mania tour, in part because of his role of liaison and translator for those that only speak Spanish on the CMLL contingent. Okumura and Carístico are the only two 2020 participants who were also on the first tour, at the time Carístico was known as "Místico".

== Results ==
=== January 10 ===
Retired wrestler Jushin Thunder Liger and NJPW chairman Naoki Sugabayashi joined the regular commentary team for the NJPW World broadcast of the event. Before the main event, Sugabayashi presenented OKUMURA with a plaque, commemorating his 25 professional wrestling anniversary.

No.	Results	Stipulations	Times
1	Ryusuke Taguchi and Fuego defeated Suzuki-Gun (Douki and Yoshinobu Kanemaru)	Tag Team match	08:00
2	Namajague, Luciferno and Euforia defeated Yuya Uemura, Guerrero Maya Jr. and Audaz	Six-man tag team match	08:34
3	Flyer and Soberano Jr. defeated Tiger and Negro Casas	Tag team match	06:30
4	Titán, Niebla Roja and Ángel de Oro defeated Forastero, El Cuatrero and Sansón	Six-man tag team match	10:10
5	Los Ingobernables de Japón (Bushi, Hiromu Takahashi and Tetsuya Naito) defeated Yota Tsuji, Hiroshi Tanahashi and Dulce Gardenia	Six-man tag team match	10:08
6	OKUMURA, Bárbaro Cavernario and Último Guerrero defeated Stuka Jr., Carístico and Satoshi Kojima	Six-man tag team match - Okumura 25th anniversary match	11:30

=== January 11 ===
No.	Results	Stipulations	Times
1	Guerrero Maya Jr. and Yota Tsuji defeated Suzuki-Gun (Yoshinobu Kanemaru and DOUKI)	Tag Team match	10:26
2	Fuego and Ryusuke Taguchi defeated Luciferno and Tiger	Tag Team match	06:58
3	Namajague, Negro Casas, and OKUMURA defeated Audaz, Fluer, and Stuka Jr.	Six-man tag team match	11:13
4	Ángel de Oro, Niebla Roja, and Titán defeated Nueva Generacion Dinamitas (Sansón, El Cuatrero, and Forastero)	Six-man tag team match	13:10
5	Los Ingobernables de Japón (EVIL, Hiromu Takahashi, and BUSHI) defeated Dulce Gardenia, Hiroshi Tanahashi, and Yuya Uemura	Six-man tag team match	12:18
6	Los Guerreros Lagunero (Euforia and Último Guerrero) defeated Carístico, Satoshi Kojima, and Soberano Jr. vs. Bárbaro Cavernario	Six-man tag team match	11:10

=== January 12 ===
No.	Results	Stipulations
1	Audaz and Yuya Uemura defeated Suzuki-Gun (Yoshinobu Kanemaru and DOUKI)	Tag Team match
2	Luciferno and Namajague defeated Fuego and Ryusuke Taguchi	Tag Team match
3	Negro Casas, OKUMURA, and Tiger defeated Guerrero Maya Jr., Soberano Jr., and Stuka Jr.	Six-man tag team match
4	Nueva Generacion Dinamitas (Sansón, El Cuatrero, and Forastero) defeated Ángel de Oro, Niebla Roja, and Titán	Six-man tag team match
5	Los Ingobernables de Japón (EVIL, Hiromu Takahashi, and BUSHI) defeated Dulce Gardenia, Hiroshi Tanahashi, and Yota Tsuji	Six-man tag team match
6	Bárbaro Cavernario and Los Guerreros Lagunero (Euforia and Último Guerrero) defeated Carístico, Satoshi Kojima, and Soberano Jr.	Six-man tag team match

=== January 13 ===
No.	Results	Stipulations	Times
1	Guerrero Maya Jr. and Yota Tsuji defeated Suzuki-Gun (DOUKI and Namajague)	Tag Team match	09:16
2	Luciferno and Tiger defeated Fuego and Ryusuke Taguchi	Tag Team match	09:02
3	Audaz, Flyer, and Stuka Jr. defeated Yoshinobu Kanemaru, Negro Casas, and OKUMURA	Six-man tag team match	07:54
4	Nueva Generacion Dinamitas (Sansón, El Cuatrero, and Forastero) defeated Ángel de Oro, Niebla Roja, and Titán	Six-man tag team match	10:52
5	Los Ingobernables de Japón (EVIL, Hiromu Takahashi, and BUSHI) defeated Dulce Gardenia, Hiroshi Tanahashi, and Yuya Uemura	Six-man tag team match	12:43
6	Carístico, Satoshi Kojima, and Soberano Jr. defeated Bárbaro Cavernario and Los Guerreros Lagunero (Euforia and Último Guerrero)	Six-man tag team match	13:01

=== January 16 ===
No.	Results	Stipulations	Times
1	Fuego and Ryusuke Taguchi defeated Suzuki-Gun (Namajague and DOUKI)	Tag Team match	07:22
2	Audaz and Guerrero Maya Jr. defeated Luciferno and Yoshinobu Kanemaru	Tag Team match	10:18
3	Los Ingobernables de Japón (EVIL, Shingo Takagi, and BUSHI) defeated Flyer, Dulce Gardenia, and Hiroshi Tanahashi	Six-man tag team match	11:01
4	Forastero and OKUMURA defeated Titán and Stuka Jr.	Tag Team match	09:06
5	Último Guerrero and Bárbaro Cavernario defeated Satoshi Kojima and Carístico	Tag Team match	13:03
6	Nueva Generacion Dinamitas (Sansón and El Cuatrero) defeated Euforia and Soberano Jr.	CMLL Family Tag Tournament first round match	09:30
7	Los Hermanos Chavez (Ángel de Oro and Niebla Roja) defeated Dinastia Casas (Negro Casas and Tiger)	CMLL Family Tag Tournament first round match	12:55

=== January 17 ===
No.	Results	Stipulations	Times
1	Fuego and Ryusuke Taguchi defeated Luciferno and DOUKI	Tag Team match	07:58
2	OKUMURA and Suzuki-Gun (Namajague and Yoshinobu Kanemaru) defeated Stuka Jr., Flyer, and Guerrero Maya Jr.	Six-man tag team match	09:41
3	Los Ingobernables de Japón (EVIL, Shingo Takagi, and BUSHI) defeated Audaz, Dulce Gardenia, and Hiroshi Tanahashi	Six-man tag team match	10:44
4	Titán defeated Forastero	Singles match	13:20
5	Satoshi Kojima and Carístico defeated Último Guerrero and Bárbaro Cavernario	Tag Team match	11:45
6	Euforia and Soberano Jr. defeated Dinastia Casas (Negro Casas and Tiger)	CMLL Family Tag Tournament third place match	08:41
7	Nueva Generacion Dinamitas (Sansón and El Cuatrero) defeated Los Hermanos Chavez (Ángel de Oro and Niebla Roja)	CMLL Family Tag Tournament final	12:21

=== January 19 ===
No.	Results	Stipulations	Times
1	Luciferno and Namajague defeated Audaz and Yota Tsuji	Tag Team match	07:45
2	Soberano Jr., Flyer, and Guerrero Maya Jr. defeated Tiger and Suzuki-Gun (Yoshinobu Kanemaru and DOUKI)	Six-man tag team match	07:30
3	Ángel de Oro, Niebla Roja, and Titán defeated Nueva Generacion Dinamitas (Sansón, El Cuatrero, and Forastero)	Six-man tag team match	12:26
4	Stuka Jr. (c) defeated OKUMURA	Singles match for the NWA World Historic Light Heavyweight Championship	10:24
5	Los Ingobernables de Japón (EVIL, Shingo Takagi, and BUSHI) defeated Dulce Gardenia, Fuego, and Ryusuke Taguchi	Six-man tag team match	12:03
6	Último Guerrero (c) defeated Satoshi Kojima	Singles match for the CMLL World Heavyweight Championship	13:18
7	Carístico, Hiroshi Tanahashi and Tiger Mask defeated Negro Casas, Euforia and Bárbaro Cavernario	Six-man tag team match - Black Cat memorial match	11:31
(c) / – the champion(s) heading into the match

=== January 20 ===
No.	Results	Stipulations	Times
1	Fuego and Ryusuke Taguchi defeated Suzuki-Gun (Yoshinobu Kanemaru and DOUKI)	Tag Team match	07:12
2	Tiger Mask defeated Tiger	Singles match	06:54
3	Flyer, Audaz, and Guerrero Maya Jr. defeated Euforia, Luciferno, and Namajague	Six-man tag team match	08:02
4	Los Ingobernables de Japón (EVIL, Shingo Takagi, and BUSHI) defeated Dulce Gardenia, Hiroshi Tanahashi, and Yuya Uemura	Six-man tag team match	11:30
5	Último Guerrero, Negro Casas and OKUMURA defeated Satoshi Kojima, Soberano Jr. and Stuka Jr.	Six-man tag team match	10:48
6	Nueva Generacion Dinamitas (Sansón, El Cuatrero and Forastero) (c) defeated Ángel de Oro, Niebla Roja and Titán	Six-man tag team match for the Mexican National Trios Championship	14:30
7	Carístico (c) defeated Bárbaro Cavernario	Singles match for the NWA World Historic Middleweight Championship	16:06
(c) / – the champion(s) heading into the match

== See also ==
- 2020 in professional wrestling
