= Fantastica Mania =

Consejo Mundial de Lucha Libre and New Japan Pro-Wrestling event series

- Promotions: Consejo Mundial de Lucha Libre; New Japan Pro-Wrestling; Revolution Pro Wrestling; Major League Wrestling
- First event: Fantastica Mania 2011
- Event gimmick: Inter-promotional matches between CMLL and NJPW; Inter-promotional matches between CMLL and RevPro

Fantastica Mania (also stylized as Fantasticamania) is a series of annual professional wrestling shows co-promoted by Mexican professional wrestling promotion Consejo Mundial de Lucha Libre (CMLL) and Japanese New Japan Pro-Wrestling (NJPW), with Revolution Pro Wrestling (RevPro) also co-promoting Fantastica Mania shows in the UK with CMLL. Fantastica Mania is a series of two to seven shows that have taken place in Japan, in January/February of each year since 2011. Since its inception in 2011, 83 Fantastica Mania shows have taken place.

== Event history ==
The Fantastica Mania event series was a result of the working relationship between Japanese-based New Japan Pro-Wrestling (NJPW) and Mexican Consejo Mundial de Lucha Libre (CMLL) who had been exchanging wrestlers for short or long periods of time for several years before 2011. In late 2010 NJPW and CMLL announced that they would co-promote two shows in January 2011 under the name Fantastica Mania. The shows would take place in Japan organized by NJPW with CMLL sending a number of their wrestlers to Japan to work the shows. In 2011 and 2012 some CMLL wrestlers toured with NJPW prior or after the shows, while some of the wrestlers flew in just for the show. In 2014, the Fantastica Mania tour was expanded to five days, with events for the first time scheduled to take place outside of Tokyo's Korakuen Hall, in Osaka and Kyoto. In 2015, Fantastica Mania was held over six shows in Osaka, Takamatsu, Kyoto and Tokyo. In 2016, Fantastica Mania was again held over six shows in Kōchi, Kyoto, Osaka and Tokyo. The following year, the tour expanded to seven shows, held in Osaka, Matsuyama, Kyoto, Nagoya and Tokyo. In 2018, the tour is set to include eight shows.

As of the conclusion of the 2017 Fantastica Mania tour 78 individual wrestlers have competed in 207 matches split over 31 shows in total. Gedo, Jyushin Thunder Liger and Okumura have worked at least one match on each of the seven tours. King Fale, Kenny Omega and Toru Yano have only worked on one show in total. The Fantastica Mania events have hosted 24 championship matches, with five title changes; Ryusuke Taguchi defeated Máscara Dorada to win the CMLL World Welterweight Championship, Apollo 55 (Prince Devitt and Ryusuke Taguchi) defeated Golden☆Lovers (Kota Ibushi and Kenny Omega) to win the IWGP Junior Heavyweight Tag Team Championship, La Sombra defeated Dragón Rojo Jr. to win the NWA World Historic Welterweight Championship, Máscara Dorada defeated Bushi to win the CMLL World Welterweight Championship and Kamaitachi defeated Dragon Lee to win the CMLL World Lightweight Championship. The CMLL World Heavyweight Championship, CMLL World Middleweight Championship, IWGP Tag Team Championship, CMLL World Trios Championship, CMLL World Welterweight Championship, NWA World Historic Welterweight Championship, IWGP Intercontinental Championship, Mexican National Light Heavyweight Championship, CMLL World Light Heavyweight Championship, Mexican National Welterweight Championship and Arena Coliseo Tag Team Championship were all successfully defended. Fantastica Mania has hosted one Lucha de Apuestas, or bet match; while the Luchas de Apuestas match is the most important match type in CMLL, NJPW hardly ever promotes matches of this type. The match saw Tiger Mask put his mask on the line against Tomohiro Ishii, who lost and had his hair shaved off after the match.

== Japanese shows ==
Year	Date	City	Venue	Main event
2011	January 22	Tokyo	Korakuen Hall	Shinsuke Nakamura, Tetsuya Naito and Averno vs. Hiroshi Tanahashi, Prince Devitt and Místico
2011	January 23	Tokyo	Korakuen Hall	Golden☆Lovers (Kota Ibushi and Kenny Omega) vs. Apollo 55 (Prince Devitt and Ryusuke Taguchi) for the IWGP Junior Heavyweight Tag Team Championship
2012	January 21	Tokyo	Korakuen Hall	Kazuchika Okada and Volador Jr. vs. Hiroshi Tanahashi and La Sombra
2012	January 22	Tokyo	Korakuen Hall	La Sombra (c) vs. Volador Jr. for the NWA World Historic Welterweight Championship
2013	January 18	Tokyo	Korakuen Hall	Hiroshi Tanahashi and La Sombra vs. Misterioso Jr. and Shinsuke Nakamura
2013	January 19	Tokyo	Korakuen Hall	Shinsuke Nakamura (c) vs. La Sombra for the IWGP Intercontinental Championship
2013	January 20	Tokyo	Korakuen Hall	Atlantis, Hiroshi Tanahashi and Prince Devitt vs. Euforia, Kazuchika Okada and Mephisto
2014	January 14	Osaka	Bodymaker Colosseum	El Desperado, Hiroshi Tanahashi and Místico vs. Kazuchika Okada, Mephisto and Rey Escorpión
2014	January 15	Kyoto	KBS Hall	El Desperado, Hiroshi Tanahashi and La Sombra vs. Kazuchika Okada, Niebla Roja and Último Guerrero
2014	January 17	Tokyo	Shin-Kiba 1st Ring	La Sombra vs. Volador Jr.
2014	January 18	Tokyo	Korakuen Hall	Mephisto (c) vs. Místico for the Mexican National Light Heavyweight Championship
2014	January 19	Tokyo	Korakuen Hall	Volador Jr. (c) vs. Máscara Dorada for the NWA World Historic Welterweight Championship
2015	January 13	Osaka	Bodymaker Colosseum	Atlantis, Hiroshi Tanahashi and Volador Jr. vs. Gran Guerrero, Kazuchika Okada and Último Guerrero
2015	January 14	Takamatsu	Takamatsu-shi Sōgō Taiikukan	Hiroshi Tanahashi, Máscara Dorada and Tiger Mask vs. Ryusuke Taguchi, La Sombra and Tetsuya Naito
2015	January 15	Kyoto	KBS Hall	Atlantis, Hiroshi Tanahashi and Volador Jr. vs. Gran Guerrero, Shinsuke Nakamura and Último Guerrero
2015	January 17	Tokyo	Shin-Kiba 1st Ring	Atlantis and Máscara Dorada vs. Los Guerreros Laguneros (Gran Guerrero and Último Guerrero)
2015	January 18	Tokyo	Korakuen Hall	Atlantis vs. Último Guerrero
2015	January 19	Tokyo	Korakuen Hall	Máscara Dorada vs. La Sombra
2016	January 17	Kōch	Kochi Sunpia Chres	Hiroshi Tanahashi, Jyushin Thunder Liger and Místico vs. Gedo, Kazuchika Okada and Último Guerrero
2016	January 19	Kyoto	KBS Hall	Hiroshi Tanahashi, Juice Robinson and Volador Jr. vs. Kazuchika Okada, Mephisto and Shinsuke Nakamura
2016	January 20	Osaka	Edion Arena Osaka	Dragon Lee and Hiroshi Tanahashi vs. Kazuchika Okada and Virus
2016	January 22	Tokyo	Korakuen Hall	Mephisto and Último Guerrero vs. Místico and Volador Jr.
2016	January 23	Tokyo	Korakuen Hall	Hiroshi Tanahashi, Místico and Volador Jr. vs. Kazuchika Okada, Mephisto and Último Guerrero
2016	January 24	Tokyo	Korakuen Hall	Volador Jr. (c) vs. Mephisto for the NWA World Historic Welterweight Championship
2017	January 13	Osaka	Edion Arena Osaka	Hechicero, Kazuchika Okada and Will Ospreay vs. Hiroshi Tanahashi, Máximo Sexy and Ryusuke Taguchi
2017	January 14	Matsuyama	Item Ehime	Euforia, Kazuchika Okada and Will Ospreay vs. Hiroshi Tanahashi, Kushida and Místico
2017	January 15	Kyoto	KBS Hall	David Finlay, Hiroshi Tanahashi and Volador Jr. vs. Kazuchika Okada, Último Guerrero and Will Ospreay
2017	January 16	Nagoya	Nagoya Congress Center	Bárbaro Cavernario, Kazuchika Okada and Will Ospreay vs. Dragon Lee, Hiroshi Tanahashi and Kushida
2017	January 20	Tokyo	Korakuen Hall	Dragon Lee (c) vs. Bárbaro Cavernario for the CMLL World Lightweight Championship
2017	January 21	Tokyo	Korakuen Hall	Máximo Sexy (c) vs. Hechicero for the CMLL World Heavyweight Championship
2017	January 22	Tokyo	Korakuen Hall	Último Guerrero vs. Volador Jr.
2018	January 12	Nagoyo	Nagoya Congress Center	Atlantis, Hiroshi Tanahashi and Místico vs. Chaos (Gedo and Kazuchika Okada) and Último Guerrero
2018	January 14	Kyoto	KBS Hall	Hiroshi Tanahashi, Místico and Niebla Roja vs. Gran Guerrero, Kazuchika Okada and Último Guerrero
2018	January 15	Takamatsu	Takamatsu City Gymnasium	Atlantis, Hiroshi Tanahashi and Niebla Roja vs. Chaos (Gedo and Kazuchika Okada) and Gran Guerrero
2018	January 16	Osaka	Edion Arena Osaka	Atlantis, Hiroshi Tanahashi and Volador Jr. vs. Chaos (Gedo and Kazuchika Okada) and El Bárbaro Cavernario
2018	January 17	Toyama	Techno Hall	Hiroshi Tanahashi, Místico and Volador Jr. vs. El Bárbaro Cavernario, Kazuchika Okada and Último Guerrero
2018	January 19	Tokyo	Korakuen Hall	Niebla Roja (c) vs. Gran Guerrero for the CMLL World Light Heavyweight Championship
2018	January 21	Tokyo	Korakuen Hall	Volador Jr. (c) vs. Barbaro Cavernario for the NWA World Historic Welterweight Championship
2018	January 22	Tokyo	Korakuen Hall	Los Guerreros Laguneros (Gran Guerrero and Último Guerrero) vs. Dragon Lee and Místico in a CMLL Brothers Tag Tournament Final Match
2019	January 11	Osaka	Osaka Prefectural Gymnasium	Los Ingobernables de Japón (Bushi, Shingo Takagi, El Terrible, and Tetsuya Naito) vs. Fujin, Raijin, Satoshi Kojima, and Toa Henare
2019	January 12	Ehime	Texport Imabari	Los Ingobernables de Japón (Bushi, Shingo Takagi, El Terrible, and Tetsuya Naito) vs. Fujin, Raijin, Satoshi Kojima, and Toa Henare
2019	January 13	Kyoto	KBS Hall	Los Ingobernables de Japón (Bushi, Shingo Takagi, El Terrible, and Tetsuya Naito) vs. Fujin, Raijin, Satoshi Kojima, and Toa Henare
2019	January 14	Gifu	Gifu Industrial Hall	Los Ingobernables de Japón (Bushi, Shingo Takagi, El Terrible, and Tetsuya Naito) vs Fujin, Raijin, Satoshi Kojima, and Toa Henare
2019	January 16	Chiba	Makuhari Messe	Dragon Lee and Místico vs. La Familia Real (Flyer and Volador Jr.)
2019	January 18	Tokyo	Korakuen Hall	Fujin, Raijin, Satoshi Kojima, and Toa Henare vs. Los Ingobernables de Japón (Bushi, Shingo Takagi, El Terrible, and Tetsuya Naito)
2019	January 20	Tokyo	Korakuen Hall	Místico and Dragon Lee vs. Los Guerreros Laguneros (Gran Guerrero and Último Guerrero)
2019	January 21	Tokyo	Korakuen Hall	Volador Jr. vs. Carístico
2020	January 10	Osaka	Edion Arena Osaka	Stuka Jr., Carístico and Satoshi Kojima vs. OKUMURA, Bárbaro Cavernario and Último Guerrero
2020	January 11	Ehime	Item Ehime	Carístico, Satoshi Kojima, and Soberano Jr. vs. Bárbaro Cavernario and Los Guerreros Lagunero (Euforia and Último Guerrero)
2020	January 12	Kyoto	KBS Hall	Carístico, Satoshi Kojima, and Soberano Jr. vs. Bárbaro Cavernario and Los Guerreros Lagunero (Euforia and Último Guerrero)
2020	January 13	Aichi	Nagoya Congress Center	Carístico, Satoshi Kojima, and Soberano Jr. vs. Bárbaro Cavernario and Los Guerreros Lagunero (Euforia and Último Guerrero)
2020	January 16	Tokyo	Korakuen Hall	Los Hermanos Chavez (Ángel de Oro and Niebla Roja) vs. Dinastia Casas (Negro Casas and Tiger)
2020	January 17	Tokyo	Korakuen Hall	Nueva Generacion Dinamitas (Sansón and El Cuatrero) vs. Los Hermanos Chavez (Ángel de Oro and Niebla Roja) for the CMLL Family Tag Tournament final
2020	January 19	Tokyo	Korakuen Hall	Carístico, Hiroshi Tanahashi and Tiger Mask vs. Negro Casas, Euforia and Bárbaro Cavernario
2020	January 20	Tokyo	Korakuen Hall	Carístico (c) vs. Bárbaro Cavernario for the NWA World Historic Middleweight Championship
2023	February 22	Takamatsu	Takamatsu City General Gymnasium	Hiroshi Tanahashi and Místico vs. Atlantis Jr. and Último Guerrero
2023	February 23	Kyoto	KBS Hall	Atlantis Jr. and Templario vs. Volador Jr. and Místico
2023	February 24	Osaka	Osaka Municipal Central Gymnasium	Atlantis Jr. and Ultimo Guerrero vs. Magia Blanca and Volador Jr.
2023	February 26	Chiba	Makuhari Messe International Conference Hall	Atlantis Jr. and Ultimo Guerrero vs. Bushi and Titán
2023	February 27	Tokyo	Korakuen Hall	Titán (c) vs. Soberano Jr. for the CMLL World Welterweight Championship
2023	February 28	Tokyo	Korakuen Hall	Atlantis Jr. vs. Místico
2024	February 12	Osaka	Edion Arena Osaka	Hiroshi Tanahashi, Máscara Dorada and Místico vs. Francesco Akira, Stuka Jr. and Último Guerrero
2024	February 13	Osaka	Osaka Prefectural Kadoma Sports Center	Hiroshi Tanahashi, Templario and Volador Jr. vs. Douki, Rocky Romero and Soberano Jr.
2024	February 14	Takamatsu	Takamatsu City General Gymnasium	El Desperado, Hechicero and Último Guerrero vs. Atlantis Jr., Hiroshi Tanahashi and Místico
2024	February 16	Nagoya	Nagoya Congress Center	Los Guerreros Laguneros (Ultimo Guerrero and Stuka Jr.) vs. Los Ingobernables de Japon (Bushi and Titán) in the semifinals of the Interfaction Tag Team Tournament
2024	February 17	Chiba	Mahukari Messe International Conference Hall	Los Guerreros Laguneros (Último Guerrero and Stuka Jr.) vs. Los Depredadores (Magnus and Volador Jr.) in the finals of the Interfaction Tag Team Tournament
2024	February 18	Tokyo	Korakuen Hall	Volador Jr. vs. Rocky Romero
2024	February 19	Tokyo	Korakuen Hall	Máscara Dorada vs. Stuka Jr.
2025	February 19	Osaka	Osaka Prefectural Kadoma Sports Center	El Desperado, Atlantis Jr. and Místico vs. Bone Soldier Jr., Averno and Último Guerrero
2025	February 20	Takamatsu	Takamatsu City General Gymnasium	El Desperado, Máscara Dorada and Místico vs. Bone Soldier Jr., Soberano Jr. and Averno
2025	February 21	Osaka	Edion Arena Osaka	El Desperado, Templario and Místico vs. Bone Soldier Jr., Averno and Volador Jr.
2025	February 22	Nagoya	Aichi Prefectural Gymnasium	El Desperado, Templario and Místico vs. Bone Soldier Jr., Averno and Volador Jr.
2025	February 24	Kyoto	KBS Hall	Hiroshi Tanahashi, Neón and Místico vs. Mascara Kantansu Tomato, Zandokan Jr. and Averno
2025	February 26	Chiba	Mahukari Messe International Conference Hall	Bone Soldier Jr., Templario, Atlantis Jr. and Místico vs. El Desperado, Averno, Último Guerrero and Volador Jr.
2025	February 27	Tokyo	Korakuen Hall	Templario vs. Volador Jr.
2025	February 28	Tokyo	Korakuen Hall	Místico (c) vs. Averno for the MLW World Middleweight Championship
2026	February 18	Tokyo	Yoyogi National Gymnasium #2	El Sky Team (Místico and Máscara Dorada) vs. Sho and Último Guerrero in the quarterfinals of the Fantastica Mania Tag Team Tournament
2026	February 21	Kochi	Chres Gymnasium	El Desperado and El Sky Team (Místico and Máscara Dorada) vs. Sho, Soberano Jr., and Hechicero
2026	February 22	Osaka	ATC Hall	El Sky Team (Místico and Máscara Dorada) vs. Los Viajeros del Espacio (Valiente Jr. and Futuro) in the semifinals of the Fantastica Mania Tag Team Tournament
2026	February 23	Aichi	Aichi Budokan	Místico and El Desperado vs. Sho and Soberano Jr.
2026	February 24	Osaka	Edion Arena Osaka #2	El Sky Team (Místico and Máscara Dorada) vs. Averno and Magnus in the finals of the Fantastica Mania Tag Team Tournament
2026	February 26	Tokyo	Korakuen Hall	Máscara Dorada vs. Hechicero
2026	February 27	Tokyo	Korakuen Hall	Místico (c) vs. Soberano Jr. for the CMLL World Light Heavyweight Championship
2026	(c) – refers to the champion(s) heading into the match			

== Mexico ==
=== 2023 ===
Fantastica Mania Mexico (2023)
- Promotion(s): Consejo Mundial de Lucha Libre; New Japan Pro-Wrestling
- Date: June 30, 2023
- City: Mexico City, Mexico
- Venue: Arena México
- Attendance: 10,000
- Tagline: 50th Aniversario Del El Satánico

Event chronology
← Previous (CMLL) 50th Aniversario Del El Satánico (NJPW) AEW x NJPW: Forbidden Door	Next → (CMLL) Grand Prix Internacional (NJPW) Independence Day

Fantastica Mania Mexico, also promoted as CMLL Presenta NJPW Fantastica Mania México 2023, was a professional wrestling event produced by New Japan Pro Wrestling (NJPW) and Consejo Mundial de Lucha Libre (CMLL), which took place on June 30, 2023, at the Arena México in Mexico City, Mexico. It was the 12th edition of the Fantastica Mania event series and first in Mexico. The event also celebrated the 50th anniversary of El Satánico.

Six matches were contested at the event. In the main event, Rocky Romero defeated Volador Jr. to retain the NWA World Historic Welterweight Championship. In other prominent matches, Máscara Dorada 2.0 defeated El Desperado, Tiger Mask vs El Satánico ended in a time-limit draw in a match relámpago and in the opening contest, Las Infernales (Dark Silueta, Zeuxis and Lluvia) defeated La Catalina, La Jarochita and Stephanie Vaquer.

==== Results ====
No.	Results	Stipulations	Times
1	Las Infernales (Dark Silueta, Zeuxis and Lluvia) defeated La Catalina, La Jarochita and Stephanie Vaquer 2-1	Lucha de Amazonas	5:34
2	Douki and Okumura defeated Audaz and Capitán Suicida 2-1	2-out-of-3 falls tag team match	10:54
3	Tiger Mask vs. El Satánico ended in a time-limit draw	Match Relámpago	10:00
4	Máscara Dorada 2.0 defeated El Desperado 2-1	2-out-of-3 falls match	12:35
5	Los Ingobernables de Japon (Bushi, Tetsuya Naito and Titán) defeated Atlantis Jr., Místico and Soberano Jr. 2-1	2-out-of-3 falls six-man tag team match	18:28
6	Rocky Romero (c) (with Tiger Mask) defeated Volador Jr. (with Máscara Dorada 2.0) 2-1	2-out-of-3 falls match for the NWA World Historic Welterweight Championship	22:02
(c) / – the champion(s) heading into the match

=== 2024 ===
Fantastica Mania Mexico (2024)
- Promotion(s): Consejo Mundial de Lucha Libre; New Japan Pro-Wrestling
- Date: June 21, 2024
- City: Mexico City, Mexico
- Venue: Arena México

Event chronology
← Previous (CMLL) Fantastica Mania: UK (NJPW) Dominion	Next → (CMLL) Fantastica Mania: USA (NJPW) Forbidden Door

The 2024 Fantastica Mexico event, also promoted as CMLL Presenta NJPW Fantastica Mania México 2024 was the second annual Fantastica Mania Mexico professional wrestling event produced by New Japan Pro Wrestling (NJPW) and Consejo Mundial de Lucha Libre (CMLL), which took place on June 21, 2024 at the Arena México in Mexico City, Mexico. It was the 16th edition of the Fantastica Mania event series and second in Mexico.

==== Results ====
No.	Results	Stipulations	Times
1	Los Viajeros Del Espacio (Futuro, Max Star and Vegas) defeated Astro Boy, Dr. Karonte and Dr. Karonte II 2-0	Two out of three falls trios match	7:20
2	Los Depredadores (Magnus and Rugido) defeated The Wolf Zaddies (Che Cabrera and Bad Dude Tito) 2-1	Two out of three falls tag team match	8:21
3	Stephanie Vaquer (c) defeated La Catalina by pinfall	Singles match for the NJPW Strong Women's Championship; The winner faced Mercedes Moné at Forbidden Door	14:09
4	Rocky Romero and Taiji Ishimori (with Zacarías) defeated Máscara Dorada and Templario 2-1	Two out of three falls tag team match	14:25
5	Zack Sabre Jr. and Michael Oku (with Amira) defeated Averno and Volador Jr. (with KeMalito) 2-0	Two out of three falls tag team match	11:58
6	Místico defeated Hiromu Takahashi	Singles match	23:42
(c) / – the champion(s) heading into the match

=== 2025 ===
Fantastica Mania Mexico (2025)
- Promotion(s): All Elite Wrestling; Consejo Mundial de Lucha Libre; New Japan Pro-Wrestling; Revolution Pro Wrestling; Ring of Honor
- Date: June 20, 2025
- City: Mexico City, Mexico
- Venue: Arena México

Event chronology
← Previous (AEW and CMLL) Grand Slam Mexico (NJPW) Dominion (RevPro) British J-Cup (ROH) Global Wars Mexico	Next → (AEW) All In (CMLL) Grand Prix International (NJPW) Death Pain Invitational (RevPro) Revolution Rumble (ROH) Supercard of Honor

The 2025 Fantastica Mania Mexico event, also promoted as CMLL Presenta NJPW Fantastica Mania México 2025 was the third annual Fantastica Mania Mexico professional wrestling event. It was produced by Consejo Mundial de Lucha Libre (CMLL) and also featured wrestlers from partner promotions New Japan Pro Wrestling (NJPW), All Elite Wrestling (AEW), Ring of Honor (ROH) and Revolution Pro Wrestling (RevPro). The event took place on June 20, 2025 at the Arena México in Mexico City, Mexico and was the 19th edition of the Fantastica Mania event series, third to take place in Mexico, and the first to involve AEW and ROH – as part of a week-long collaboration between the three promotions – and RevPro.

==== Results ====
No.	Results	Stipulations	Times
1	Red Velvet defeated Kira by pinfall	Singles match	7:06
2	La Jarochita defeated Thunder Rosa by pinfall	Singles match	9:07
3	Los Depredadores (Rugido and Magnus) and Gideón Fantasma (Difunto and Zandokan Jr.) defeated Rocky Romero, Robbie X and CRU (Action Andretti and Lio Rush) by pinfall	Eight-man tag team match	15:51
4	Mercedes Moné (c) defeated La Catalina by submission	Singles match for the CMLL Women's World Championship	12:48
5	Yota defeated Ultimo Guerrero by disqualification	Singles match	14:36
6	Hiromu Takahashi, Shingo Takagi and Titán defeated United Empire (TJP, Francesco Akira and Templario) by pinfall	Trios match	15:31
7	Neón defeated Kevin Knight by pinfall	Lightning match	9:33
8	Ricochet defeated Volador Jr. by pinfall	Singles match	9:52
9	Bandido and Hologram defeated El Sky Team (Mistico and Máscara Dorada) by pinfall	Tag team match	15:58
(c) / – the champion(s) heading into the match

=== 2026 ===
Fantastica Mania Mexico (2026)
- Promotion(s): Consejo Mundial de Lucha Libre; New Japan Pro-Wrestling
- Date: June 19, 2026
- City: Mexico City, Mexico
- Venue: Arena México

Event chronology
← Previous (CMLL) Global Wars Cincinnati (NJPW) Dominion 6.15 in Osaka-jo Hall	Next → (CMLL and NJPW) Forbidden Door

The 2026 Fantastica Mexico event, also promoted as CMLL Presenta NJPW Fantastica Mania México 2026 was the third annual Fantastica Mania Mexico professional wrestling event produced by New Japan Pro Wrestling (NJPW) and Consejo Mundial de Lucha Libre (CMLL), which took place on June 19, 2026 at the Arena México in Mexico City, Mexico. It was the 22nd edition of the Fantastica Mania event series and second in Mexico.

==== Results ====
No.	Results	Stipulations	Times
1	Los Viajeros del Espacio (Valiente Jr., Max Star, and Futuro) defeated Shoma Kato and Los Demonios Samurais (Okumura and Yutani) by pinfall	Trios match	10:19
2	India Sioux (c) defeated Rina by pinfall	Singles match for the CMLL Japan Women's Championship	11:31
3	Templario and El Sky Team (Máscara Dorada and Neón) (with KeMalito) defeated Unbound Co. (Taiji Ishimori, Robbie X, and Titán) by pinfall	Trios match	11:15
4	Los Hermanos Chavez (Ángel de Oro and Niebla Roja) (c) defeated House of Torture (Sanada and Dick Togo) by pinfall	Tag team match for the CMLL World Tag Team Championship	13:02
5	El Phantasmo defeated Bárbaro Cavernario by pinfall	Singles match	14:09
6	Konosuke Takeshita and Hechicero defeated Los Guerreros Laguneros (Último Guerrero and Gran Guerrero) by pinfall	Tag team match	12:29
7	Místico, Blue Panther, and Tiger Mask defeated Averno, Volador Jr., and Black Tiger	Trios match	12:37
(c) / – the champion(s) heading into the match

== UK ==
=== 2023 ===
Fantastica Mania UK (2023)
- Promotion(s): Consejo Mundial de Lucha Libre; Revolution Pro Wrestling
- Date: September 23, 2023
- City: Manchester, England
- Venue: Love Factory

Event chronology
← Previous (CMLL) CMLL 90th Anniversary Show (RevPro) 11 Year Anniversary Show	Next → (CMLL) Noche de Campeones (RevPro) Risky Business

Fantastica Mania UK was a professional wrestling event produced by Revolution Pro Wrestling (RevPro) and Consejo Mundial de Lucha Libre (CMLL), which took place on September 23, 2023, at the Love Factory in Manchester, England. It was the 13th edition of the Fantastica Mania event series, and first to feature RevPro. The event was held between two shows on the same night.

==== Show 1 ====
No.	Results	Stipulations	Times
1	Magia Blanca defeated Levi Muir by pinfall	Singles match	6:07
2	Audaz, Ricky Knight Jr. and Zak Knight defeated Lykos Gym (Kid Lykos and Kid Lykos II) and Sangre Imperial by pinfall	Tag team match	10:28
3	Titán defeated Robbie X by pinfall	Singles match	11:04
4	Wild Boar defeated Capitán Suicida by pinfall	Singles match	9:53
5	Subculture (Mark Andrews and Flash Morgan Webster) (c) defeated Okumura and Zandokan Jr. by pinfall	Tag team match for the Undisputed British Tag Team Championship	13:42
6	Último Guerrero, Trent Seven and Hechicero defeated Atlantis Jr., Guerrero Maya Jr. and Michael Oku by pinfall	Trios match	18:10
(c) / – the champion(s) heading into the match

==== Show 2 ====
No.	Results	Stipulations	Times
1	Levi Muir and Trent Seven defeated Guerrero Maya Jr. and Capitan Suicida	Tag team match	16:02
2	Sangre Imperial, Wild Boar and Okumura defeated Audaz, Ricky Knight Jr. and Zak Knight by pinfall	Trios match	12:46
3	Robbie X defeated Magia Blanca by pinfall	Singles match	7:32
4	Subculture (Mark Andrews and Flash Morgan Webster) and Titán (with Dani Luna) defeated Zandokan Jr. and Lykos Gym (Kid Lykos and Kid Lykos II) by pinfall	Trios match	13:05
5	Último Guerrero defeated Atlantis Jr. by pinfall	Singles match	11:13
6	Michael Oku (c) defeated Hechicero by submission	Singles match for the Undisputed British Heavyweight Championship	21:38
(c) / – the champion(s) heading into the match

=== 2024 ===
Fantastica Mania UK (2024)
- Promotion(s): Consejo Mundial de Lucha Libre; Revolution Pro Wrestling
- Date: May 19, 2024
- City: London, England
- Venue: York Hall

Pay-per-view chronology
← Previous; Homenaje a Dos Leyendas (CMLL); Epic Encounter (RevPro)	Next → Fantastica Mania Mexico (CMLL); 12 Year Anniversary Show (RevPro)

The 2024 Fantastica Mania UK event was the second annual Fantastica Mania UK professional wrestling event produced by Revolution Pro Wrestling (RevPro) and Consejo Mundial de Lucha Libre (CMLL), which took take place on May 17, 2024, at the York Hall in London, England. It was the 15th edition of the Fantastica Mania event series, and second to feature RevPro. The event was held between two shows on the same night.

==== Show 1 ====
No.	Results	Stipulations	Times
1	Stephanie Vaquer defeated Kanji by pinfall	Singles match	14:05
2	Bárbaro Cavernario defeated Robbie X by pinfall	Singles match	11:10
3	Atlantis, Atlantis Jr. and Dulce Gardenia defeated Okumura and Lykos Gym (Kid Lykos and Kid Lykos II) by pinfall	Trios match	12:38
4	Luke Jacobs and Grizzled Young Veterans (James Drake and Zack Gibson) defeated Máscara Dorada, Futuro and Neón by pinfall	Trios match	15:38
5	Hechicero defeated Connor Mills by pinfall	Singles match	16:23
6	Ángel de Oro and Último Guerrero defeated Michael Oku and Zozaya by pinfall	Tag team match	18:17
7	Gabe Kidd, Magnus and Templario defeated Místico, Ricky Knight Jr., and JJ Gale by pinfall	Trios match	15:24

==== Show 2 ====
No.	Results	Stipulations	Times
1	Ángel de Oro defeated Zozaya by pinfall	Singles match	12:24
2	Okumura, Bárbaro Cavernario and Hechicero defeated Robbie X, Dulce Gardenia and Futuro by pinfall	Trios match	13:32
3	Máscara Dorada defeated Gabe Kidd and Magnus by pinfall	Three-way match	9:42
4	Stephanie Vaquer defeated Rhio by pinfall	Singles match for the NJPW Strong Women's Championship	12:00
5	Neón defeated Jordon Breaks (c) by pinfall	Singles match for the Undisputed British Cruiserweight Championship	8:58
6	Grizzled Young Veterans (James Drake and Zack Gibson) (c) defeated Atlantis and Atlantis Jr. by pinfall	Tag team match for the Undisputed British Tag Team Championship	11:36
7	Místico defeated Templario by submission	Singles match	20:40
8	Michael Oku (c) defeated Último Guerrero by pinfall	Singles match for the Undisputed British Heavyweight Championship	17:37
(c) / – the champion(s) heading into the match

=== 2025 ===
Fantastica Mania UK (2025)
- Promotion(s): Consejo Mundial de Lucha Libre; Revolution Pro Wrestling
- Date: October 18, 2025
- City: Wolverhampton, England
- Venue: The Hangar

Pay-per-view chronology
← Previous; Noche de Campeones (CMLL); 13 Year Anniversary Show (RevPro)	Next → International Women's Grand Prix (CMLL); Uprising (RevPro)

The 2025 Fantastica Mania UK event was the third annual Fantastica Mania UK professional wrestling event produced by Revolution Pro Wrestling (RevPro) and Consejo Mundial de Lucha Libre (CMLL). The event took place on October 18, 2025, at The Hangar in Wolverhampton, England. It was the 20th edition of the Fantastica Mania event series, and the third to feature RevPro. The event was held between two shows on the same night.

==== Show 1 ====
No.	Results	Stipulations	Times
1	Esfinge defeated Robbie X by pinfall	Singles match	8:45
2	Connor Mills defeated Xelhua by submission	Singles match	9:25
3	Jay Joshua defeated Difunto by pinfall	Singles match	9:01
4	Fuego and Nino Bryant defeated Okumura and Felino Jr. by pinfall	Tag team match	10:16
5	Titán defeated JJ Gale by pinfall	Singles match	7:39
6	Hechicero defeated Chris Ridgeway by pinfall	Singles match	18:11
7	Michael Oku and El Sky Team (Místico and Máscara Dorada) (with Amira Blair) defeated Kaven, Trew, and Lacey (Will Kaven, Mark Trew, and Kieron Lacey) by pinfall	Trios match	12:56
8	Sha Samuels defeated Último Guerrero by pinfall	Singles match	10:05

==== Show 2 ====
No.	Results	Stipulations	Times
1	David Francisco and Okumura defeated JJ Gale and Fuego by pinfall	Tag team match	6:57
2	Esfinge defeated Leon Cage by pinfall	Singles match	9:29
3	Robbie X and Felino Jr. defeated The Flyinf Bryant Brothers (Zander Bryant and Leland Bryant) by pinfall	Tag team match	8:51
4	Titán defeated Difunto by submission	Singles match	12:21
5	Último Guerrero and Diamond Eyes (Connor Mills and Jay Joshua) defeated CPF (Danny Black, Joe Lando, and Maverick Mayhem) by pinfall	Trios match	12:02
6	Máscara Dorada defeated Lio Rush by pinfall	Singles match	15:29
7	Hechicero defeated Xelhua by pinfall	Singles match	23:05
8	Místico (c) defeated Michael Oku (with Amira Blair) by submission	Singles match for the CMLL World Light Heavyweight Championship	21:26
(c) / – the champion(s) heading into the match

=== 2026 ===
Fantastica Mania UK (2026)
- Promotion(s): Consejo Mundial de Lucha Libre; Revolution Pro Wrestling
- Date: October 17, 2026
- City: Wolverhampton, England
- Venue: The Hangar

Pay-per-view chronology
← Previous; 93rd Anniversary Show (CMLL); Raw Deal (RevPro)	Next → TBD (CMLL); TBD (RevPro)

The 2026 Fantastica Mania UK event is the fourth annual Fantastica Mania UK professional wrestling event produced by Revolution Pro Wrestling (RevPro) and Cones Mundial de Lucha Libre (CMLL). The event took place on October 17, 2026, at The Hangar in Wolverhampton, England. It will be the 24th edition of the Fantastica Mania event series, and the fourth to feature RevPro. The event will be held across two shows on the same night

==== Show 1 ====
No.	Results	Stipulations
1	Okumura and Top Tier (Josh Holly and James Ellis) defeated Fuego, Isaac Murray and Chicago Desailly by pinfall	Trios match
2	Cameron Khai defeated Max Star by pinfall	Undisputed British Cruiserweight Tournament semifinals match
3	Jay Joshua defeated Black Tiger by pinfall	Singles match
4	Luke Jacobs and Último Guerrero defeated The Flying Bryant Brothers (Leland Bryant and Zander Bryant) by submission	Tag team match
5	Titán defeated Leon Cage by pinfall	Undisputed British Cruiserweight Tournament semifinals match
6	Hechicero defeated Nino Bryant by pinfall	Singles match
7	Zandokan Jr. defeated JJ Gale by pinfall	Singles match
8	El Sky Team (Místico and Máscara Dorada) defeated CPF (Danny Black and Joe Lando) by submission	Tag team match

==== Show 2 ====
No.	Results	Stipulations
1	Okumura and Top Tier (Josh Holly and James Ellis) defeated Fuego, Elvin Naryan, and Owen Swain by pinfall	Trios match
2	Leon Cage defeated Max Star by pinfall	Singles match
3	Black Tiger defeated Maverick Mayhem by pinfall	Singles match
4	Máscara Dorada defeated Will Kaven (with Mark Trew and Kieron Lacey) by pinfall	Singles match
5	Cameron Khai defeated Titán by pinfall	Undisputed British Cruiserweight Tournament final for the vacant Undisputed British Cruiserweight Championship
6	Connor Mills (c) defeated Zandokan Jr. by pinfall	Singles match for the Undisputed British Heavyweight Championship
7	Hechicero defeated Liam Slater (with HMD) by pinfall	Singles match for the CMLL World Heavyweight Championship
8	Michael Oku and Místico (with Amira Blair) defeated Luke Jacobs and Último Guerrero by pinfall	Tag team match
(c) / – the champion(s) heading into the match

== USA ==
=== 2024 ===
Fantastica Mania USA
- Promotion(s): New Japan Pro-Wrestling; Consejo Mundial de Lucha Libre
- Date: July 13, 2024
- City: San Jose, California, United States
- Venue: Mt. Pleasant High School

Pay-per-view chronology
← Previous; Forbidden Door (NJPW); Fantastica Mania: Mexico (CMLL)	Next → Tamashii XI (NJPW); 91st Anniversary Show (CMLL)

The 2024 Fantastica Mania: USA event, also promoted as NJPW Presents CMLL Fantastica Mania 2024 – Lucha Libre USA was the inaugural Fantastica Mania USA professional wrestling event produced by New Japan Pro-Wrestling (NJPW) and Consejo Mundial de Lucha Libre (CMLL), which took place at Mt. Pleasant High School in San Jose, California. It was the 17th edition of the Fantastica Mania event series, and first to take place in the United States of America.

==== Results ====
No.	Results	Stipulations	Times
1	The DKC defeated Viento, Adrian Quest, and Cucuy by pinfall	Four-way match for the Copa Fantastica trophy	8:33
2	CozyMax (Satoshi Kojima and Shigeo Okumura) (c) defeated Rugido and Magnus by pinfall	Tag team match for the MLW World Tag Team Championship	9:30
3	Willow Nightingale defeated Lluvia and Viva Van by pinfall	Three-way match for the vacant CMLL World Women's Championship	10:06
4	Hechicero and Virus defeated TMDK (Zack Sabre Jr. and Bad Dude Tito) by submission	Tag team match	13:51
5	Yota Tsuji defeated Bárbaro Cavernario by pinfall	Singles match	14:06
6	Gabe Kidd (c) defeated Último Guerrero by pinfall	Singles match for the Strong Openweight Championship	12:12
7	Místico and Douki defeated Rocky Romero and Volador Jr. by submission	Relevos Increíbles	24:31
(c) / – the champion(s) heading into the match

=== 2026 ===
The 2026 Fantastica Mania USA event was the second Fantastica Mania USA professional wrestling event co-produced by Major League Wrestling (MLW), New Japan Pro-Wrestling (NJPW) and Consejo Mundial de Lucha Libre (CMLL). It took place on April 12, 2026, at Festival Hall in Charleston, South Carolina. It was the 21st edition of the Fantastica Mania event series, the second to take place in the United States of America, and the first to feature Major League Wrestling (MLW). It aired as a four-week event as episodes of MLW Fusion from July 18 to August 8, which included the Blood and Thunder special.

== See also ==
- List of New Japan Pro-Wrestling pay-per-view events
