= Fantastica Mania 2014 =

Japanese/Mexican professional wrestling show series

- Promotional poster featuring CMLL and NJPW wrestlers taking part in the events
- Promotion(s): Consejo Mundial de Lucha Libre; New Japan Pro-Wrestling
- Date: January 14, 2014; January 15, 2014; January 17, 2014; January 18, 2014; January 19, 2014
- City: Osaka, Japan (January 14); Kyoto, Japan (January 15); Tokyo, Japan (January 17, 18 and 19)
- Venue: Bodymaker Colosseum (January 14); KBS Hall (January 15); Shin-Kiba 1st Ring (January 17); Korakuen Hall (January 18 and 19)
- Attendance: 1,300 (January 14); 1,000 (January 15); 300 (January 17); 1,900 (January 18); 1,900 (January 19)

Event chronology
← Previous; 2013	Next → 2015

Consejo Mundial de Lucha Libre event chronology
← Previous; Pequeños Reyes del Aire	Next → Gran Alternativa

New Japan Pro-Wrestling event chronology
← Previous; New Year Dash!!	Next → The New Beginning in Hiroshima

Fantastica Mania 2014 was a series of five professional wrestling events co-produced by Japanese promotion New Japan Pro-Wrestling (NJPW) and Mexican promotion Consejo Mundial de Lucha Libre (CMLL) taking place between January 15 and 19, 2014.

2014 was the fourth year in which NJPW and CMLL come together to produce Fantastica Mania events, but the first time they held five events in one year, compared to two events in 2011 and 2012 and three in 2013. 2014 also marked the first time Fantasticamania events were held outside of Tokyo's Korakuen Hall, with the January 14 taking place in Osaka, Osaka at the Bodymaker Colosseum, the January 15 event in Kyoto, Kyoto at the KBS Hall and the January 17 event in Tokyo's Shin-Kiba 1st Ring, while the January 18 and 19 events were still held in Korakuen Hall.

2014 marked the first time some of the Fantastica Mania events were broadcast on pay-per-view (PPV).

== Background ==
The events featured five to seven professional wrestling matches on each event with different wrestlers involved in pre-existing scripted feuds or storylines. Wrestlers portray either villains (referred to as heels in general or rudos in Mexico) or fan favorites (faces or técnicos in Mexico) as they compete in wrestling matches with pre-determined outcomes.

Following the success of Fantastica Mania 2013, then New Japan Pro-Wrestling (NJPW) president Naoki Sugabayashi announced that in 2014 he would like to take the event outside of Tokyo, naming Osaka and Nagoya as possible candidates. Fantastica Mania 2014 was officially announced on October 25, 2013, during the first day of NJPW's "Road to Power Struggle" tour, with events scheduled to take place in Osaka, Kyoto and Tokyo. On October 31, NJPW announced that the January 17 Shin-Kiba 1st Ring event would feature only CMLL luchadores, which would have made it the first Fantastica Mania event to not feature any NJPW wrestlers. NJPW wrestlers Taichi and Taka Michinoku were, however, later announced for the event. On November 7, NJPW announced the sixteen CMLL wrestlers taking part in the tour. A promotional poster released for the tour advertised NJPW wrestlers Bushi, Hiroshi Tanahashi, Jyushin Thunder Liger and Shinsuke Nakamura as taking part in the tour. The cards for all five events were released on January 6, 2014. On January 10, NJPW announced that the January 14 and 18 events would be broadcast live on pay-per-view (PPV) in Japan and internationally on internet pay-per-view (iPPV) through Niconico and Ustream, making them the first Fantastica Mania events available on PPV. On January 16, the tour ending January 19 event was also announced as a PPV.

== Results ==
=== January 14 ===
No.	Results	Stipulations	Times
1	Suzuki-gun (Taichi and Taka Michinoku) defeated Bushiroad and Titán	Tag team match	09:15
2	Niebla Roja, Okumura (with Mima Shimoda) and Vangellys defeated Fuego, Rey Cometa and Stuka Jr.	Six-man tag team match	06:40
3	Jyushin Thunder Liger and Máximo defeated Gedo and Jado	Tag team match	10:26
4	Tetsuya Naito and Volador Jr. defeated Kushida and Máscara Dorada	Tag team match	08:36
5	Shinsuke Nakamura and Último Guerrero defeated Rush and La Sombra	Tag team match	12:25
6	El Desperado, Hiroshi Tanahashi and Místico defeated Kazuchika Okada, Mephisto and Rey Escorpión	Six-man tag team match	10:17

=== January 15 ===
No.	Results	Stipulations	Times
1	Bushiroad and Titán defeated Gedo and Jado	Tag team match	08:55
2	Fuego, Rey Cometa and Stuka Jr. defeated Okumura (with Mima Shimoda), Rey Escorpión and Vangellys	Six-man tag team match	07:33
3	Suzuki-gun (Taichi and Taka Michinoku) defeated Jyushin Thunder Liger and Máximo	Tag team match	09:51
4	Máscara Dorada and Tetsuya Naito defeated Kushida and Volador Jr.	Tag team match	11:32
5	Místico and Rush defeated Mephisto and Shinsuke Nakamura	Tag team match	12:13
6	El Desperado, Hiroshi Tanahashi and La Sombra defeated Kazuchika Okada, Niebla Roja and Último Guerrero	Six-man tag team match	11:40

=== January 17 ===
No.	Results	Stipulations	Times
1	Fuego, Rey Cometa and Stuka Jr. defeated Okumura (with Mima Shimoda), Taichi and Taka Michinoku	Six-man tag team match	08:36
2	Mephisto and Vangellys defeated Máscara Dorada and Titán	Tag team match	10:35
3	Rey Escorpión (c) defeated Máximo	Singles match for the CMLL World Light Heavyweight Championship	09:48
4	Místico and Rush defeated Los Guerreros Laguneros (Niebla Roja and Último Guerrero)	Tag team match	10:44
5	La Sombra vs. Volador Jr. ended in a draw	Match Relampago VIP	10:00
(c) / – the champion(s) heading into the match

=== January 18 ===
No.	Results	Stipulations	Times
1	Máximo defeated Jado and Taichi	Three-way match	09:35
2	Okumura (with Mima Shimoda) and Yujiro Takahashi defeated Rey Cometa and Stuka Jr.	Tag team match	06:57
3	Niebla Roja, Rey Escorpión, Vangellys (with La Comandante) and Yoshi-Hashi defeated Fuego, Kushida, Tiger Mask and Titán	Eight-man tag team match	08:56
4	El Desperado and Máscara Dorada defeated Bushiroad and Volador Jr.	Tag team match	08:13
5	Shinsuke Nakamura defeated Rush	Singles match	10:18
6	Kazuchika Okada (with Gedo), Tomohiro Ishii and Último Guerrero defeated Hiroshi Tanahashi, La Sombra and Tetsuya Naito	Six-man tag team match	19:42
7	Mephisto (c) (with Okumura) defeated Místico (with La Sombra)	Singles match for the Mexican National Light Heavyweight Championship	14:05
(c) / – the champion(s) heading into the match

=== January 19 ===
No.	Results	Stipulations	Times
1	Máscara Don and Máximo defeated Suzuki-gun (Taichi and Taka Michinoku)	Tag team match	10:16
2	Rey Cometa and Stuka Jr. defeated Okumura (with Mima Shimoda) and Yoshi-Hashi	Tag team match	04:46
3	Bushiroad, El Desperado, Fuego, Tiger Mask and Titán defeated Gedo, Jado, Niebla Roja, Toru Yano and Vangellys	Ten-man tag team match	09:57
4	Rush and Tetsuya Naito defeated Rey Escorpión and Tomohiro Ishii	Tag team match	12:38
5	La Sombra defeated Último Guerrero	Singles match	11:54
6	Hiroshi Tanahashi, Kota Ibushi and Místico defeated Mephisto, Shinsuke Nakamura and Yujiro Takahashi	Six-man tag team match	11:51
7	Volador Jr. (c) (with Máximo) defeated Máscara Dorada (with El Desperado)	Singles match for the NWA World Historic Welterweight Championship	17:59
(c) / – the champion(s) heading into the match

== See also ==
- 2014 in professional wrestling
