= Fuego (wrestler) =

Mexican professional wrestler

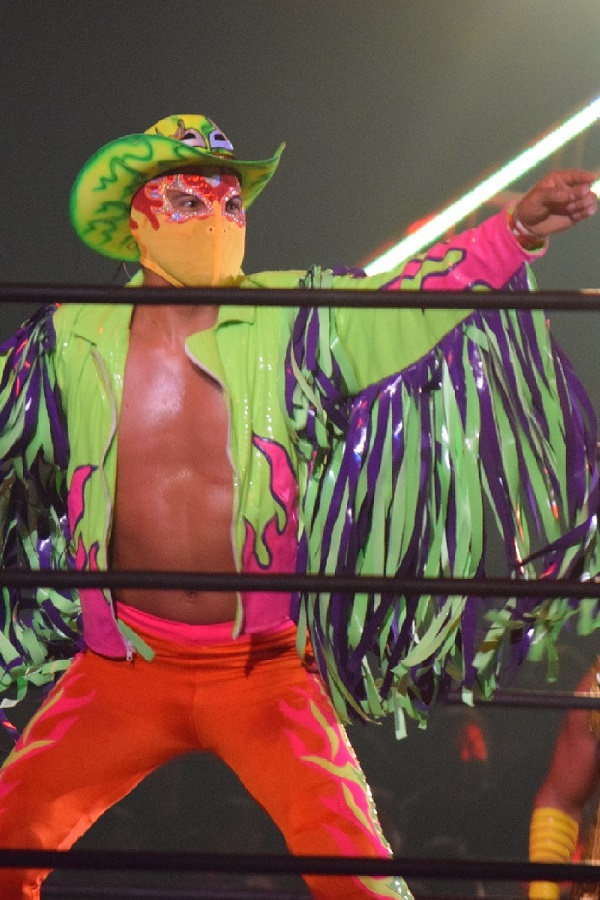
- Fuego in November 2016

Personal information
- Born: December 11, 1981 (age 44) Oaxaca, Oaxaca, Mexico

Professional wrestling career
- Ring name(s): Flash; Fuego; Pelón Encapuchado
- Billed height: 1.77 m (5 ft 9 1/2 in)
- Billed weight: 78 kg (172 lb)
- Trained by: Charito de Oro; Skayde; El Cholo
- Debut: 2003

Fuego (born December 11, 1981) is a Mexican professional wrestler signed to Consejo Mundial de Lucha Libre (CMLL). His real name is not a matter of public record, as is often the case with masked wrestlers in Mexico, where their private lives are kept a secret from the wrestling fans.

He used the ring character Flash, inspired by the comic book character The Flash, from his debut in 2003 until November 2009, when he changed his ring name to Fuego (Spanish for "Fire"). Fuego is a one-time CMLL Arena Coliseo Tag Team Champion with Stuka Jr., having held the title for a record four-and-a-half years, and a one-time Occidente Middleweight Champion. He has also wrestled for New Japan Pro-Wrestling (NJPW) in Japan, and Major League Wrestling (MLW) and Ring of Honor (ROH) in the United States.

== Professional wrestling career ==
While in high school, he noticed his friends becoming popular, prompting him to seek something similar for himself. At the age of 18, he traveled to La Merced in Mexico City and met Charito de Oro, who trained him for a career in professional wrestling. He made his debut in 2003, immediately adopting the ring name Flash and an outfit and mask that was patterned after the comic book character The Flash.

=== Consejo Mundial de Lucha Libre (2004–present) ===
==== Flash (2004–2009) ====
After only a year of professional experience, Flash was offered and accepted a contract with the Mexican promotion Consejo Mundial de Lucha Libre (CMLL), making his debut in April 2004 at a show in Puebla. On December 15, 2006, Flash appeared on his first major show, Sin Piedad ("No Mercy"), where he and Súper Nova defeated Los Hombres del Camuflaje ("Men in Camoflauge"; Artillero and Súper Comando) by disqualification. On June 29, 2007, Flash was paired with Marco Corleone in the Torneo Gran Alternativa ("Great Alternative Tournament"), a tournament where a newcomer teams with an experienced wrestler; they lost to Dos Caras Jr. and Valiente in the first round.

By 2008, Flash had begun teaming with Stuka Jr. on a semi-regular basis, especially on CMLL's "lower level" shows away from Arena México. They were one of sixteen teams entered into a tournament for the revived CMLL Arena Coliseo Tag Team Championship, with the first three rounds commencing on June 22. Flash and Stuka Jr. defeated Astro Boy and Molotov in the first round, Los Guerreros Tuareg ("The Tuareg Warriors"; Nitro and Skándalo) in the quarter-final, and Bronco and Diamante Negro in the semi-final. On June 28, they defeated Los Infernales (Euforia and Nosferatu) in the final to win the championship. They made their first successful title defense on December 14 against Los Infernales. At La Hora Cero ("Zero Hour") on January 11, 2009, Los Infernales defeated Flash and Stuka Jr. in a non-title match. Flash and Stuka Jr. teamed with Metálico in a loss to Euforia, Skándalo and Virus on July 31 at Infierno en el Ring ("Inferno in the Ring"). On October 12, Flash took part in the Reyes del Aire ("Kings of the Air") tournament, but was the first wrestler eliminated from the torneo cibernetico by Sangre Azteca.

==== Fuego (2009–present) ====
At a CMLL press conference on November 19, it was announced that Flash had changed his name to "Fuego" ("Fire"), adopting a "fire" inspired outfit. He also began wearing a neon orange and electric yellow cowboy hat and used the song "El Coco No" as his entrance theme. On March 19, 2010, Fuego, Ángel de Oro and Stuka Jr. lost to Poder Mexica ("Mexican Power"; Dragón Rojo Jr., Misterioso II and Azteca) in the opening match of Homenaje a Dos Leyendas ("Homage to Two Legends"). He unsuccessfully competed in the Reyes del Aire on January 1, 2011, but was able to eliminate Raziel. On March 25, Fuego was paired with Atlantis in that year's Torneo Gran Alternativa, competing in Block A, where they lost to Diamante and La Sombra in the first round. At the CMLL 78th Anniversary Show on September 30, Fuego participated in the semi-final of the Leyenda de Plata ("The Silver Legend") tournament, where he scored the first elimination over El Hijo del Signo, before being the third wrestler eliminated by Azteca. At Homenaje a Dos Leyendas on March 2, 2012, Fuego, Titán and Tritón lost to Misterioso II, Namajague and Rey Escorpión.

On March 3, 2013, Fuego and Stuka Jr. lost the CMLL Arena Coliseo Tag Team Championship to La Fievre Amarilla ("The Yellow Fever"; Namajague and Okumura), ending their reign after four-and-a-half years. At the CMLL 80th Anniversary Show on September 13, they teamed with Rey Cometa in a loss to Namajague, Okumura and Tomohiro Ishii. On October 27, Fuego won his first singles title, defeating Bárbaro Cavernario for the Occidente Middleweight Championship, but lost it to Demonio Maya on April 27, 2014. On June 15, he unsuccessfully challenged Virus for the CMLL World Light Heavyweight Championship. At the CMLL 82nd Anniversary Show on September 18, Fuego, Esfinge and The Panther lost to Disturbio, Puma King and Virus. On December 25, at Infierno en el Ring, Fuego was one of twelve men risking their mask in the main event steel cage match, but kept it safe as the ninth man to leave the cage. On February 24, 2018, Fuego and Star Jr. participated in a tournament for the CMLL Arena Coliseo Tag Team Championship, defeating Akuma and Templario in the first round, but lost to La Dinastia Casas ("The Casas Dynasty"; Puma and Tiger) in the quarter-final. He and Audaz defeated Templario and Virus on August 3 at the Negro Casas 40th Anniversary Show.

On February 28, 2020, Fuego and Dulce Gardenia lost to El Hijo del Villano III and Templario in the first round of a tournament for the reintroduced Mexican National Tag Team Championship. Due to the COVID-19 pandemic, Fuego did not wrestle for the entirety of 2020 and 2021, returning to the ring on October 15, 2022, to team with Los Depredadores ("The Predators"; Magia Blanca and Magnus) and defeat Bestia Negra, Difunto and Zandokan Jr. In late 2023, Fuego worked under the ring character Pelón Encapuchado, a reference to the Mexican candy Pelón Pelo Rico. On April 27, 2025, Fuego was part of an eight-man torneo cibernetico for the Campeonato Embajador de los Ninos ("Children's Ambassador Championship"), but was the first wrestler eliminated by Fugaz. The following year, on April 26, 2026, Fuego defeated Dragon de Fuego, Dragon Legendario, El Hijo del Pantera, Fugaz, Max Star, Pantera Jr. and Rey Pegasus to win the championship.

=== New Japan Pro-Wrestling (2014–2020) ===
From January 14 to 19, 2014, Fuego made his Japanese debut for the New Japan Pro-Wrestling (NJPW) and CMLL co-produced Fantastica Mania 2014 tour. He primarily worked undercard matches, often teaming with Rey Cometa and Stuka Jr. From June 28 to July 13, Fuego worked another tour with NJPW opposite Máscara Dorada. Fuego returned on October 25, where he and Ryusuke Taguchi lost to El Desperado and Taichi in the first round of the 2014 Super Jr. Tag Tournament. Fuego remained with NJPW until the Power Struggle pay-per-view on November 8, where he and Tiger Mask lost to BUSHI and Dorada on the pre-show.

Fuego made his return to Japan for the Fantastica Mania 2016 tour in January 2016. On October 21, Fuego and Taguchi took part in the 2016 Super Jr. Tag Tournament, defeating Jushin Thunder Liger and Tiger Mask in the first round. Nine days later, in the semi-finals, they were eliminated after losing to Roppongi Vice (Beretta and Rocky Romero). At Power Struggle on November 5, Fuego, Ángel de Oro, Titán and Taguchi lost to David Finlay, Liger, Ricochet and Tiger Mask. Fuego then participated in the Fantastica Mania 2018 and Fantastica Mania 2020 tours in January 2018 and 2020, respectively.

=== Major League Wrestling (2024) ===
Fuego appeared for Major League Wrestling (MLW) at Azteca Lucha on May 11, 2024, where he teamed with Star Jr. in a loss to Averno and Magnus.

== Personal life ==
Outside of wrestling, Fuego works as a dental prosthetist to support his wife and two children.

== Not to be mistaken for ==
Several wrestlers have used the ring name "Flash", most notably a wrestler from Guadalajara, Jalisco, who held the Mexican National Lightweight Championship under that name. The Guadalajara Flash passed the name on to his sons, who wrestle as Flash I and Flash II or, alternately, Hijo de Flash I and Hijo de Flash II.

== Championships and accomplishments ==
- Consejo Mundial de Lucha Libre

- CMLL Arena Coliseo Tag Team Championship (1 time) – with Stuka Jr.
- Occidente Middleweight Championship (1 time)
- Campeonato Embajador de los Ninos (2026)

== Luchas de Apuestas record ==
Winner (wager)	Loser (wager)	Location	Event	Date	Notes
Flash (mask)	Hooligan II (mask)	Cuernavaca, Morelos	Live event	September 1, 2005	(Note: Relevos suicida match: lost to Spider-Man and Hooligan III and were forced to wrestle against each other.)
