= Fantastica Mania 2019 =

Japanese/Mexican professional wrestling show series

- Promotion(s): New Japan Pro-Wrestling; Consejo Mundial de Lucha Libre
- Date: January 11, 2019; January 12, 2019; January 13, 2019; January 14, 2019; January 16, 2019; January 20, 2019; January 21, 2019
- City: Jan. 11: Osaka, Japan; Jan. 12: Imabari, Japan; Jan. 13: Kyoto, Japan; Jan. 14: Gifu, Japan; Jan. 16: Chiba, Japan; Jan. 18, 20, 21: Tokyo, Japan
- Venue: Jan. 11: Osaka Prefectural Gymnasium #2; Jan. 12: Texport Imabari; Jan. 13: KBS Hall; Jan. 14: Gifu Industrial Hall; Jan. 16: Makuhari Messe; Jan. 18, 20, 21: Korakuen Hall
- Attendance: Jan. 11: 1,082; Jan. 12: 1,090; Jan. 13: 801; Jan. 14: 1,607; Jan. 16: 1,015; Jan. 18: 1,526; Jan. 20: 1,560; Jan. 21: 1,582

Event chronology
← Previous; 2018	Next → 2020

Consejo Mundial de Lucha Libre event chronology
← Previous; Reyes del Aire	Next → Universal Championship

New Japan Pro-Wrestling event chronology
← Previous; New Year Dash!!	Next → Road to The New Beginning

Fantastica Mania 2019 was a professional wrestling tour, scripted and co-produced by the Japanese New Japan Pro-Wrestling (NJPW) promotion and the Mexican Consejo Mundial de Lucha Libre (CMLL) promotion. The tour started on January 11 and ran until January 21, 2019, with shows taking place in Osaka, Ehime, Kyoto, Gifu, Chiba and Tokyo.

The 2019 tour was the ninth time that NJPW and CMLL co-promoted shows in Japan under the Fantastica Mania name. With a total of eight shows scheduled, the tour tied the 2018 tour as the longest in Fantastica Mania history at that point in time. The four initial shows featured six matches each night, while the four latter shows featured seven. Select events were shown on Fighting TV Samurai and TV Asahi, or live on NJPW World with subsequent video-on-demand options.

== Background ==
The 2019 Fantastica Mania tour was the ninth year in a row where Japanese wrestling promotion New Japan Pro-Wrestling (NJPW) promoted a series of shows with their Mexican partner Consejo Mundial de Lucha Libre (CMLL). Due to the co-promotional nature of the shows, they rarely featured any development in ongoing NJPW or CMLL storylines, opting instead to focus on inter-promotional matches. The Fantastica Mania shows featured various professional wrestling matches planned out by CMLL and NJPW, with some wrestlers involved in scripted feuds. The wrestlers portray either heels (referred to as rudos in Mexico, those that play the part of the "bad guys") or faces (técnicos in Mexico, the "good guy" characters) as they perform.

For the 2019 tour El Desperado, Sho and Yoh all competed under the ring personas they used during their training excursions with CMLL. El Desperado reprised his role as Namajague, CMLL's version of the Japanese folklore demon Namahage. Sho and Yoh, collectively known as Roppongi 3K, worked under the names Raijin and Fujin respectively.

Highlighted matches on the tour include Carístico – a técnico – teaming with rudos in various relevos increíbles tag matches, as well as the four-team CMLL Family Tag Tournament, with the winners facing the winners of last year's CMLL Brothers Tag Tournament, Los Guerreros Laguneros (Último Guerrero and Gran Guerrero). The January 20 show was the only show to feature a championship match, as La Nueva Generación Dinamita (Sansón, Cuatrero and Forastero) defended the Mexican National Trios Championship against Atlantis, Titán and Ángel de Oro. The 2019 tour also featured the in-ring debut of Atlantis Jr., the son of Atlantis, working every show on the tour.

The January 18 show hosted a memorial match in honor of Mexican wrestler Black Cat, who died of a heart attack on January 28, 2006. In this match, the team of Satoshi Kojima, Toa Henare, Raijin and Fujin defeated Los Ingobernables (Terrible, Tetsuya Naito, Bushi and Shingo Takagi). In the tour's last night, on January 21, the characters from the Japanese movie "My Dad is a Heel Wrestler" squared off in a special tag team match, with the team of Dragon George (Kazuchika Okada) and SweetGorilla Maruyama (Togi Makabe) defeating the team of Gokiburi Mask (Hiroshi Tanahashi) and Ginbae Mask (Ryusuke Taguchi).

== Results ==
=== January 11 ===
No.	Results	Stipulations	Times
1	Templario and Bullet Club (Taiji Ishimori and Gedo) defeated Audaz, Ryusuke Taguchi and Tiger Mask	Six-man tag team match	7:44
2	Forastero and Suzuki-gun (Taichi and Yoshinobu Kanemaru) defeated Titán, Flyer and Jushin Thunder Liger	Six-man tag team match	7:32
3	Sansón and Okumura defeated Atlantis and Atlantis Jr.	Tag team match	10:16
4	Místico, Dragon Lee and Ángel de Oro defeated Los Guerreros Laguneros (Último Guerrero and Gran Guerrero) and Cuatrero	Six-man tag team match	12:13
5	Carístico, Bárbaro Cavernario and Namajague defeated Volador Jr., Soberano Jr. and Kushida	Relevos increíbles six-man tag team match	8:37
6	Los Ingobernables (Terrible, Tetsuya Naito, Bushi and Shingo Takagi) defeated Satoshi Kojima, Toa Henare, Raijin and Fujin	Eight-man tag team match	14:14

=== January 12 ===
No.	Results	Stipulations	Times
1	Audaz, Ryusuke Taguchi and Kushida defeated Templario and Bullet Club (Taiji Ishimori and Gedo)	Six-man tag team match	8:00
2	Titán and Flyer defeated Forastero and Taichi	Tag team match	8:29
3	Sansón, Okumura and Yoshinobu Kanemaru defeated Atlantis, Atlantis Jr. and Tiger Mask	Six-man tag team match	9:53
4	Último Guerrero, Bárbaro Cavernario and Cuatrero defeated Místico, Ángel de Oro and Soberano Jr.	Six-man tag team match	15:42
5	Volador Jr., Dragon Lee and Jushin Thunder Liger defeated Carístico, Gran Guerrero and Namajague	Relevos increíbles six-man tag team match	8:30
6	Los Ingobernables (Terrible, Tetsuya Naito, Bushi and Shingo Takagi) defeated Satoshi Kojima, Toa Henare, Raijin and Fujin	Eight-man tag team match	14:51

=== January 13 ===
No.	Results	Stipulations	Times
1	Templario and Bullet Club (Taiji Ishimori and Gedo) defeated Audaz, Ryusuke Taguchi and Jushin Thunder Liger	Six-man tag team match	5:30
2	Ángel de Oro and Kushida defeated Cuatrero and Taichi	Tag team match	8:31
3	Atlantis, Flyer and Atlantis Jr. defeated Sansón, Okumura and Yoshinobu Kanemaru	Six-man tag team match	9:24
4	Místico, Titán and Soberano Jr. defeated Último Guerrero, Bárbaro Cavernario and Forastero	Six-man tag team match	16:16
5	Carístico, Gran Guerrero and Namajague defeated Volador Jr., Dragon Lee and Tiger Mask	Relevos increíbles six-man tag team match	10:38
6	Los Ingobernables (Terrible, Tetsuya Naito, Bushi and Shingo Takagi) defeated Satoshi Kojima, Toa Henare, Raijin and Fujin	Eight-man tag team match	14:31

=== January 14 ===
No.	Results	Stipulations	Times
1	Audaz, Ryusuke Taguchi and Tiger Mask defeated Templario and Bullet Club (Taiji Ishimori and Gedo)	Six-man tag team match	7:21
2	Cuatrero and Taichi defeated Ángel de Oro and Flyer	Tag team match	8:06
3	Atlantis, Atlantis Jr. and Kushida defeated Sansón, Okumura and Yoshinobu Kanemaru	Six-man tag team match	7:43
4	Dragon Lee, Titán and Soberano Jr. defeated Gran Guerrero, Bárbaro Cavernario and Forastero	Six-man tag team match	14:03
5	Místico, Volador Jr. and Jushin Thunder Liger defeated Último Guerrero, Carístico and Namajague	Relevos increíbles six-man tag team match	9:47
6	Los Ingobernables (Terrible, Tetsuya Naito, Bushi and Shingo Takagi) defeated Satoshi Kojima, Toa Henare, Raijin and Fujin	Eight-man tag team match	15:36

=== January 16 ===
No.	Results	Stipulations	Times
1	Forastero and Bullet Club (Taiji Ishimori and Gedo) defeated Titán, Ryusuke Taguchi and Kushida	Six-man tag team match	7:41
2	Raijin and Fujin defeated Los Ingobernables de Japón (Bushi and Shingo Takagi)	Tag team match	10:21
3	Ángel de Oro, Soberano Jr. and Audaz defeated Bárbaro Cavernario, Okumura and Namajague	Six-man tag team match	12:10
4	Los Ingobernables (Terrible and Tetsuya Naito) defeated Satoshi Kojima and Toa Henare	Tag team match	12:02
5	Carístico, Jushin Thunder Liger and Tiger Mask defeated Los Guerreros Laguneros (Último Guerrero, Gran Guerrero and Templario)	Six-man tag team match	11:21
6	La Nueva Generación Dinamita (Sansón and Cuatrero) defeated Atlantis and Atlantis Jr.	CMLL Family Tag Tournament 2019 semifinal match	9:52
7	Místico and Dragon Lee defeated La Familia Real (Volador Jr. and Flyer)	CMLL Family Tag Tournament 2019 semifinal match	14:35

=== January 18 ===
No.	Results	Stipulations	Times
1	Audaz, Ryusuke Taguchi and Jushin Thunder Liger defeated Templario and Bullet Club (Taiji Ishimori and Gedo)	Six-man tag team match	6:31
2	Titán and Ángel de Oro defeated Forastero and Okumura	Tag team match	8:41
3	Satoshi Kojima, Toa Henare, Raijin and Fujin defeated Los Ingobernables (Terrible, Tetsuya Naito, Bushi and Shingo Takagi)	Eight-man tag team match	11:43
4	Los Guerreros Laguneros (Último Guerrero and Gran Guerrero) defeated Atlantis and Atlantis Jr.	Tag team match	11:44
5	Carístico and Namajague defeated La Familia Real (Volador Jr. and Flyer)	Relevos increíbles tag team match	9:49
6	Bárbaro Cavernario defeated Soberano Jr.	Singles match	15:40
7	Místico and Dragon Lee defeated La Nueva Generación Dinamita (Sansón and Cuatrero)	CMLL Family Tag Tournament 2019 final match	14:05

=== January 20 ===
No.	Results	Stipulations	Times
1	Bullet Club (Taiji Ishimori and Gedo) defeated Flyer and Ryusuke Taguchi	Tag team match	8:20
2	Titán and Ángel de Oro defeated El Cuatrero and Templario	Tag team match	11:30
3	Los Ingobernables de Japón (Tetsuya Naito, Bushi and Shingo Takagi) defeated Toa Henare, Raijin and Fujin	Six-man tag team match	11:17
4	La Nueva Generación Dinamita (Sansón and Forastero) and Okumura defeated Atlantis, Atlantis Jr. and Jushin Thunder Liger	Six-man tag team match	10:12
5	Carístico, Bárbaro Cavernario and Namajague defeated Volador Jr., Soberano Jr. and Audaz	Relevos increíbles six-man tag team match	11:11
6	Terrible defeated Satoshi Kojima	Singles match	11:00
7	Místico and Dragon Lee defeated Los Guerreros Laguneros (Último Guerrero and Gran Guerrero)	CMLL Brothers Tag Tournament 2018 winner vs. CMLL Family Tag Tournament 2019 winner	17:11

=== January 21 ===
No.	Results	Stipulations	Times
1	Bárbaro Cavernario and Templario defeated Flyer and Audaz	Tag team match	9:35
2	Atlantis Jr. defeated Okumura	Singles match	7:39
3	Satoshi Kojima, Toa Henare and Roppongi 3K (Sho and Yoh) vs. Los Ingobernables (Terrible, Tetsuya Naito, Bushi and Shingo Takagi) ended in a no contest	Eight-man tag team match	12:15
4	La Nueva Generación Dinamita (Sansón, Cuatrero and Forastero) (c) defeated Atlantis, Titán and Ángel de Oro	Six-man tag team match for the Mexican National Trios Championship	14:28
5	Los Guerreros Laguneros (Último Guerrero and Gran Guerrero) and Namajague defeated Místico, Dragon Lee and Soberano Jr.	Six-man tag team match	13:25
6	Dragon George and SweetGorilla Maruyama defeated Gokiburi Mask and Ginbae Mask	Tag team match	13:05
7	Volador Jr. defeated Carístico	Singles match	17:55
(c) / – the champion(s) heading into the match

== See also ==
- 2019 in professional wrestling
