= Fantastica Mania 2017 =

Japanese/Mexican professional wrestling show series

- Promotional poster for the third and fourth shows of the tour, featuring both CMLL and NJPW wrestlers
- Promotion(s): Consejo Mundial de Lucha Libre; New Japan Pro-Wrestling
- Date: January 13, 2017; January 14, 2017; January 15, 2017; January 16, 2017; January 20, 2017; January 21, 2017; January 22, 2017
- City: Osaka (Jan 13); Matsuyama (Jan 14); Kyoto (Jan 15); Nagoya (Jan 16); Tokyo (Jan 20–22)
- Venue: Edion Arena Osaka (Jan 13); Item Ehime (Jan 14); KBS Hall (Jan 15); Nagoya Congress Center (Jan 16); Korakuen Hall (Jan 20–22)
- Attendance: 1,015 (Jan 13); 1,104 (Jan 14); 778 (Jan 15); 1,402 (Jan 16); 1,515 (Jan 20); 1,559 (Jan 21); 1,592 (Jan 22)

Event chronology
← Previous; 2016	Next → 2018

Consejo Mundial de Lucha Libre event chronology
← Previous; Sin Piedad	Next → Torneo Nacional de Parejas Increíbles

New Japan Pro-Wrestling event chronology
← Previous; New Year Dash!!	Next → Road to the New Beginning; The New Beginning in Sapporo

Fantastica Mania 2017 was a professional wrestling tour, co-produced by the Japanese New Japan Pro-Wrestling (NJPW) promotion and the Mexican Consejo Mundial de Lucha Libre (CMLL) promotion. The tour took place between January 13 and 22, 2017, with shows taking place in Osaka, Matsuyama, Kyoto, Nagoya and Tokyo, Japan. The 2017 shows were the seventh time that NJPW and CMLL co-promoted shows in Japan under the Fantastica Mania name.

With seven shows, the 2017 tour was the longest in Fantastica Mania history. The shows featured seven matches each, including two matches contested for championships owned by CMLL.

== Background ==
The 2017 Fantastica Mania tour was the seventh year in a row where Japanese wrestling promotion New Japan Pro-Wrestling (NJPW) promoted a series of shows in Japan alongside their Mexican partner promotion Consejo Mundial de Lucha Libre (CMLL). The 2017 tour was shows 25 to 31, a total of seven shows.

The tour was officially announced on October 24, 2016. Originally, NJPW confirmed the locations of six shows with a seventh pending confirmation. The seventh show was officially announced on November 4. The shows take place in Osaka, Kyoto and Tokyo, all of which had previously hosted Fantastica Mania events, as well as Matsuyama and Nagoya, which host their first events. The three final shows in Tokyo would air live through NJPW's internet streaming site, NJPW World.

NJPW announced the CMLL wrestlers taking part in the tour on October 30. Included were returning wrestlers Atlantis, Bárbaro Cavernario, Dragon Lee, Euforia, Hechicero, Máximo Sexy, Místico, Okumura, Stuka Jr., Titán, Último Guerrero and Volador Jr. and debuting wrestlers Blue Panther Jr., Ephesto, Raziel and Soberano Jr. Also announced for the tour was CMLL ring announcer Evan. On November 21, Rush was added to the tour, three days after he had made his surprise return to NJPW as part of the 2016 World Tag League.

The cards for the events were released by the two promotions on January 5, 2017, (Mexican time) and January 6 (Japanese time). The tour would include two title matches, contested for championships owned by CMLL. On January 20, Dragon Lee would defend the CMLL World Lightweight Championship against Bárbaro Cavernario and on January 21, Máximo Sexy would defend the CMLL World Heavyweight Championship against Hechicero.

== Results ==
=== January 13 ===
No.	Results	Stipulations	Times
1	Henare and Soberano Jr. defeated Jado and Raziel	Tag team match	08:30
2	Ephesto, Gedo and Okumura (with Mima Shimoda) defeated Jyushin Thunder Liger, Stuka Jr. and Tiger Mask	Six-man tag team match	07:22
3	Los Ingobernables de Japón (Evil and Sanada) defeated Blue Panther Jr. and David Finlayv	Tag team match	08:00
4	Dragon Lee and Titán defeated Los Ingobernables de Japón (Bushi and Hiromu Takahashi)	Tag team match	07:47
5	Bárbaro Cavernario and Los Guerreros Laguneros (Euforia and Último Guerrero) defeated Kushida and Sky Team (Místico and Volador Jr.)	Six-man tag team match	14:19
6	Atlantis and Mascara Don defeated Los Ingobernables (Rush and Tetsuya Naito)	Tag team match	09:39
7	Hiroshi Tanahashi, Máximo Sexy and Ryusuke Taguchi defeated Chaos (Kazuchika Okada and Will Ospreay) and Hechicero	Six-man tag team match	12:02

=== January 14 ===
No.	Results	Stipulations	Times
1	Ephesto and Jado defeated Henare and Jyushin Thunder Liger	Tag team match	07:51
2	Gedo and Raziel defeated David Finlay and Soberano Jr.	Tag team match	07:13
3	Los Ingobernables de Japón (Bushi, Evil and Sanada) defeated Blue Panther Jr., Ryusuke Taguchi and Tiger Mask	Six-man tag team match	08:52
4	Dragon Lee and Stuka Jr. defeated Bárbaro Cavernario and Okumura (with Mima Shimoda)	Tag team match	05:53
5	Hechicero and Último Guerrero defeated Máximo Sexy and Volador Jr.	Tag team match	14:27
6	Los Ingobernables (Hiromu Takahashi, Rush and Tetsuya Naito) defeated Atlantis, Mascara Don and Titán	Six-man tag team match	09:31
7	Hiroshi Tanahashi, Kushida and Místico defeated Chaos (Kazuchika Okada and Will Ospreay) and Euforia	Six-man tag team match	13:50

=== January 15 ===
No.	Results	Stipulations	Times
1	Blue Panther Jr. and Henare defeated Ephesto and Raziel	Tag team match	07:41
2	Jado and Okumura (with Mima Shimoda) defeated Jyushin Thunder Liger and Stuka Jr.	Tag team match	06:20
3	Los Ingobernables de Japón (Bushi, Hiromu Takahashi and Sanada) defeated Kushida, Ryusuke Taguchi and Titán	Six-man tag team match	10:44
4	Dragon Lee and Tiger Mask defeated Bárbaro Cavernario and Gedo	Tag team match	08:34
5	Euforia and Hechicero defeated Máximo Sexy and Místico	Tag team match	11:15
6	Los Ingobernables (Evil, Rush and Tetsuya Naito) defeated Atlantis, Mascara Don and Soberano Jr.	Six-man tag team match	10:12
7	David Finlay, Hiroshi Tanahashi and Volador Jr. defeated Chaos (Kazuchika Okada and Will Ospreay) and Último Guerrero	Six-man tag team match	12:45

=== January 16 ===
No.	Results	Stipulations	Times
1	Jado & Gedo and Raziel defeated Henare, Jyushin Thunder Liger and Tiger Mask	Six-man tag team match	08:40
2	David Finlay and Stuka Jr. defeated Ephesto and Okumura	Tag team match	04:21
3	Los Ingobernables de Japón (Bushi and Sanada) defeated Ryusuke Taguchi and Soberano Jr.	Tag team match	09:33
4	Los Ingobernables de Japón (Evil and Tetsuya Naito) defeated Blue Panther Jr. and Mascara Don	Tag team match	07:38
5	Los Guerreros Laguneros (Euforia and Último Guerrero) and Hechicero defeated Máximo Sexy and Sky Team (Místico and Volador Jr.)	Six-man tag team match	12:18
6	Los Ingobernables (Hiromu Takahashi and Rush) defeated Atlantis and Titán	Six-man tag team match	07:53
7	Dragon Lee, Hiroshi Tanahashi and Kushida defeated Bárbaro Cavernario and Chaos (Kazuchika Okada and Will Ospreay)	Six-man tag team match	13:03

=== January 20 ===
No.	Results	Stipulations	Times
1	Blue Panther Jr. and Henare defeated Ephesto and Will Ospreay	Tag team match	06:36
2	Jyushin Thunder Liger, Soberano Jr. and Tiger Mask defeated Jado & Gedo and Raziel	Six-man tag team match	06:40
3	Hechicero and Okumura (with Mima Shimoda) defeated Máximo Sexy and Stuka Jr.	Tag team match	06:34
4	Los Ingobernables (Bushi, Evil, Rush, Sanada and Tetsuya Naito) defeated Atlantis, David Finlay, Hiroshi Tanahashi, Kushida and Ryusuke Taguchi	Ten-man tag team match	10:35
5	Los Guerreros Laguneros (Euforia and Último Guerrero) and Kazuchika Okada defeated Juice Robinson and Sky Team (Místico and Volador Jr.)	Six-man tag team match	13:32
6	Hiromu Takahashi defeated Titán	Singles match	14:57
7	Dragon Lee (c) (with Soberano Jr.) defeated Bárbaro Cavernario (with Hechicero)	Singles match for the CMLL World Lightweight Championship	20:20
(c) / – the champion(s) heading into the match

=== January 21 ===
No.	Results	Stipulations	Times
1	Ephesto, Jado & Gedo and Raziel defeated Blue Panther Jr., Henare, Jyushin Thunder Liger and Tiger Mask	Eight-man tag team match	06:51
2	Stuka Jr. defeated Okumura (with Mima Shimoda)	Singles match	07:55
3	Bárbaro Cavernario and Chaos (Kazuchika Okada and Will Ospreay) defeated Kushida, Ryusuke Taguchi and Soberano Jr.	Six-man tag team match	09:42
4	Los Ingobernables de Japón (Bushi, Evil, Hiromu Takahashi, Sanada and Tetsuya Naito) defeated David Finlay, Dragon Lee, Hiroshi Tanahashi, Juice Robinson and Titán	Ten-man tag team match	08:57
5	Los Guerreros Laguneros (Euforia and Último Guerrero) defeated Sky Team (Místico and Volador Jr.)	Tag team match	13:39
6	Rush defeated Atlantis	Singles match	10:46
7	Máximo Sexy (c) (with Stuka Jr.) defeated Hechicero (with Bárbaro Cavernario)	Singles match for the CMLL World Heavyweight Championship	15:59
(c) / – the champion(s) heading into the match

=== January 22 ===
No.	Results	Stipulations	Times
1	Bárbaro Cavernario and Jado & Gedo defeated Blue Panther Jr., Henare and Soberano Jr.	Six-man tag team match	07:44
2	Jyushin Thunder Liger, Stuka Jr. and Tiger Mask defeated Hechicero, Okumura (with Mima Shimoda) and Raziel	Six-man tag team match	06:58
3	Los Ingobernables de Japón (Bushi and Hiromu Takahashi) defeated Dragon Lee and Titán	Tag team match	09:07
4	Chaos (Kazuchika Okada and Will Ospreay) and Ephesto defeated Juice Robinson, Máximo Sexy and Ryusuke Taguchi	Six-man tag team match	08:17
5	Los Ingobernables (Evil, Rush, Sanada and Tetsuya Naito) defeated Atlantis, David Finlay, Hiroshi Tanahashi and Kushida	Eight-man tag team match	09:58
6	Místico defeated Euforia	Singles match	11:24
7	Volador Jr. defeated Último Guerrero	Singles match	15:50

== See also ==
- 2017 in professional wrestling
