= Fantastica Mania 2015 =

Japanese/Mexican professional wrestling show series

- Official poster of the last Fantastica Mania show of 2015 with images of Místico, Último Guerrero, Mr. Niebla and Volador Jr., Volador Jr. is depicted as masked even though he had lost it in 2013
- Promotion(s): Consejo Mundial de Lucha Libre; New Japan Pro-Wrestling
- Date: January 13, 2015; January 14, 2015; January 15, 2015; January 17, 2015; January 18, 2015; January 19, 2015
- City: Osaka, Japan (Jan 13); Takamatsu, Japan (Jan 14); Kyoto, Japan (Jan 15); Tokyo, Japan (Jan 17-19)
- Venue: Osaka Prefectural Gymnasium (Bodymaker Colosseum) (Jan 13); Takamatsu-shi Sōgō Taiikukan (Jan 14); KBS Hall (Jan 15); Shin-Kiba 1st Ring (Jan 17); Korakuen Hall (Jan 18 and 19)
- Attendance: 1,300 (Jan 13); 1,000 (Jan 14); 850 (Jan 15); 300 (Jan 17); 1,950 (Jan 18); 1,950 (Jan 19)

Event chronology
← Previous; 2014	Next → 2016

Consejo Mundial de Lucha Libre event chronology
← Previous; Pequeño Reyes del Aire	Next → Torneo Nacional de Parejas Increíbles

New Japan Pro-Wrestling event chronology
← Previous; New Year Dash!!	Next → The New Beginning in Osaka

The Fantastica Mania 2015 event was a series of six professional wrestling events in Japan, co-produced by the Japanese promotion New Japan Pro-Wrestling (NJPW) and the Mexican promotion Consejo Mundial de Lucha Libre (CMLL) and took place between January 13 and 19, 2015.

The 2015 shows were the fifth time that NJPW and CMLL have co-promoted shows in Japan under the Fantastica Mania name. The 2015 event featured six shows in total, one more than the Fantastica Mania 2014 series, and the most shows of any year to date. The 2015 show was the first time the joint show was being held in Takamatsu and Kyoto while it had previously held shows in both Tokyo and Osaka.

== Background ==
The events featured six to eight professional wrestling matches on each event. The 2015 Fantastica Mania series of shows were the fifth year in a row where Japanese wrestling promotion New Japan Pro-Wrestling (NJPW) has promoted a series of shows in Japan along with their Mexican partner promotion Consejo Mundial de Lucha Libre (CMLL). The 2015 series of shows were show 13 through 18, a total of 6 shows, the highest number of any year up until that point. The show in Takamatsu, Japan on January 14 will be the first time Fantastiamaniac takes place in Takamatsu. In the summer of 2014 Bárbaro Cavernario won the 2014 2014 version of the En Busca de un Ídolo ("In search of a Idol") tournament and as part of winning the tournament he was guaranteed participation in the 2015 Fantastica Mania series of matches. When CMLL and NJPW made the announcement of the six dates in 2015 they also announced Bárbaro Cavernario and Último Guerrero as the first two Mexican competitors for the series of shows. On November 21 CMLL announced the full field of 17 CMLL wrestlers going to Japan; Atlantis, La Sombra, Volador Jr., Místico, Gran Guerrero, Mr. Niebla, Máscara Dorada, Pólvora, Mephisto, Okumura, Ángel de Oro, Stuka Jr., Rey Cometa, Tritón and Stigma. The 2015 tour would be the first time that Bárbaro Cavernario, Gran Guerrero, Mr. Niebla, Pólvora, Ángel de Oro, Tritón and Stigma would work the Fantastica Mania events; and also the first year that Máximo would not be on the Fantastica Mania shows. On December 12, it was announced that NJPW wrestlers Hiroshi Tanahashi, Shinsuke Nakamura, Tetsuya Naito and Kazuchika Okada would also be taking part in the tour. The full cards for all six events were released on January 6, 2015.

== Results ==
=== January 13 ===
No.	Results	Stipulations	Times
1	Rey Cometa and Tritón defeated La Peste Negra (Bárbaro Cavernario and Mr. Niebla)	Tag team match	5:59
2	Ángel de Oro vs. Okumura ended in a draw	Match Relampago	10:00
3	Gedo and Pólvora defeated Jyushin Thunder Liger and Místico	Tag team match	10:09
4	Stigma, Stuka Jr. and Tiger Mask defeated Mephisto, Shinsuke Nakamura and Yoshi-Hashi	Six-man tag team match	11:39
5	Ryusuke Taguchi, La Sombra and Tetsuya Naito defeated Captain New Japan, Kushida and Máscara Dorada	Six-man tag team match	10:16
6	Atlantis, Hiroshi Tanahashi and Volador Jr. defeated Gran Guerrero, Kazuchika Okada and Último Guerrero	Six-man tag team match	17:31

=== January 14 ===
No.	Results	Stipulations	Times
1	Okumura (with Mima Shimoda) and Yoshi-Hashi defeated Ángel de Oro and Kushida	Tag team match	9:06
2	Jyushin Thunder Liger and Stuka Jr. defeated Gedo and Mephisto	Tag team match	11:00
3	La Peste Negra (Bárbaro Cavernario and Mr. Niebla) defeated Sho Tanaka and Stigma	Tag team match	7:38
4	Kazuchika Okada and Pólvora defeated Místico and Tritón	Tag team match	9:53
5	Gran Guerrero, Shinsuke Nakamura and Último Guerrero defeated Atlantis, Captain New Japan and Volador Jr.	Six-man tag team match	11:04
6	Ryusuke Taguchi, La Sombra and Tetsuya Naito defeated Hiroshi Tanahashi, Máscara Dorada and Tiger Mask	Six-man tag team match	13:49

=== January 15 ===
No.	Results	Stipulations	Times
1	Bárbaro Cavernario and Yoshi-Hashi defeated Kushida and Yohei Komatsu	Tag team match	9:16
2	Mr. Niebla and Okumura (with Mima Shimoda) defeated Ángel de Oro and Stigma	Tag team match	8:31
3	Gedo and Pólvora defeated Místico and Tiger Mask	Tag team match	9:40
4	Kazuchika Okada (with Gedo) and Mephisto defeated Captain New Japan and Stuka Jr.	Tag team match	8:25
5	Ryusuke Taguchi, La Sombra and Tetsuya Naito defeated Jyushin Thunder Liger, Máscara Dorada and Tritón	Six-man tag team match	11:17
6	Gran Guerrero, Shinsuke Nakamura and Último Guerrero defeated Atlantis, Hiroshi Tanahashi and Volador Jr.	Six-man tag team match	11:46

=== January 17 ===
No.	Results	Stipulations	Times
1	Rey Cometa and Stuka Jr. defeated La Peste Negra (Bárbaro Cavernario and Mr. Niebla)	Tag team match; Fantastica Mania 2015 Tag Tournament first round match	4:10
2	Los Guerreros Laguneros (Gran Guerrero and Último Guerrero) defeated Stigma and Volador Jr.	Tag team match; Fantastica Mania 2015 Tag Tournament first round match	9:32
3	Mephisto and Pólvora defeated Místico and Tritón	Tag team match; Fantastica Mania 2015 Tag Tournament first round match	7:09
4	Atlantis and Máscara Dorada defeated La Sombra and Tetsuya Naito	Tag team match; Fantastica Mania 2015 Tag Tournament first round match	8:05
5	Los Guerreros Laguneros (Gran Guerrero and Último Guerrero) defeated Rey Cometa and Stuka Jr.	Tag team match; Fantastica Mania 2015 Tag Tournament semifinal match	8:13
6	Atlantis and Máscara Dorada defeated Mephisto and Pólvora	Tag team match; Fantastica Mania 2015 Tag Tournament semifinal match	4:27
7	Ángel de Oro (c) (with Rey Cometa) defeated Okumura (with Mima Shimoda and Pólvora)	Singles match for the CMLL World Light Heavyweight Championship	12:13
8	Atlantis and Máscara Dorada defeated Los Guerreros Laguneros (Gran Guerrero and Último Guerrero)	Tag team match; Fantastica Mania 2015 Tag Tournament final match	16:54
(c) / – the champion(s) heading into the match

=== January 18 ===
No.	Results	Stipulations	Times
1	Ángel de Oro, Jyushin Thunder Liger and Tiger Mask defeated Chaos (Gedo, Tomohiro Ishii and Yoshi-Hashi)	Six-man tag team match	10:40
2	Bárbaro Cavernario and Okumura (with Mima Shimoda) defeated Kushida and Tritón (with Rey Cometa)	Tag team match	7:29
3	Ryusuke Taguchi, La Sombra and Tetsuya Naito defeated Captain New Japan, Mascara Don and Máscara Dorada	Six-man tag team match	10:24
4	Volador Jr. (c) (with Tritón) defeated Gran Guerrero (with Bárbaro Cavernario)	Singles match for the NWA World Historic Welterweight Championship	10:24
5	Mephisto (c) (with Yujiro Takahashi) defeated Stuka Jr. (with Ángel de Oro)	Singles match for the Mexican National Light Heavyweight Championship	13:06
6	Hiroshi Tanahashi, Místico and Stigma defeated Kazuchika Okada, Pólvora and Shinsuke Nakamura	Six-man tag team match	11:56
7	Último Guerrero defeated Atlantis	Singles match	18:05
(c) / – the champion(s) heading into the match

=== January 19 ===
No.	Results	Stipulations	Times
1	Jyushin Thunder Liger, Kushida, Stuka Jr. and Tiger Mask defeated Gedo, Okumura (with Mima Shimoda), Tomohiro Ishii and Yoshi-Hashi	Eight-man tag team match	9:28
2	Ryusuke Taguchi and Tetsuya Naito defeated Captain New Japan and Tritón	Tag team match	6:51
3	Bullet Club (Mephisto and Yujiro Takahashi) defeated Ángel de Oro and Stigma	Tag team match	10:22
4	Bárbaro Cavernario defeated Rey Cometa	Singles match	11:28
5	Místico defeated Pólvora	Singles match	11:47
6	Atlantis, Hiroshi Tanahashi, Kota Ibushi and Volador Jr. defeated Gran Guerrero, Kazuchika Okada, Shinsuke Nakamura and Último Guerrero	Eight-man tag team match	12:54
7	La Sombra defeated Máscara Dorada	Singles match	18:23

== See also ==
- 2015 in professional wrestling
