= Fantastica Mania 2016 =

Japanese/Mexican professional wrestling show series

- Promotional poster featuring Hiroshi Tanahashi, Máscara Dorada and Místico
- Promotion(s): Consejo Mundial de Lucha Libre; New Japan Pro-Wrestling
- Date: January 17, 2016; January 20, 2016; January 23, 2016; January 24, 2016
- City: Kōchi (Jan 17); Kyoto (Jan 19); Osaka (Jan 20); Tokyo (Jan 22–24)
- Venue: Kochi Sunpia Chres (Jan 17); KBS Hall (Jan 19); Edion Arena Osaka (Jan 20); Korakuen Hall (Jan 22–24)
- Attendance: 1,214 (Jan 17); 820 (Jan 19); 1,025 (Jan 20); 1,566 (January 22); 1,593 (January 23); 1,599 (January 24)

Event chronology
← Previous; 2015	Next → 2017

Consejo Mundial de Lucha Libre event chronology
← Previous; La Copa Junior	Next → Homenaje a Dos Leyendas

New Japan Pro-Wrestling event chronology
← Previous; New Year Dash!!	Next → The New Beginning in Osaka

Fantastica Mania 2016 was a series of six professional wrestling events in Japan, co-produced by the Japanese promotion New Japan Pro-Wrestling (NJPW) and the Mexican promotion Consejo Mundial de Lucha Libre (CMLL), which took place between January 17 and 24, 2016. The 2016 shows were the sixth time that NJPW and CMLL had co-promoted shows in Japan under the Fantastica Mania name.

Much like the previous year, the 2016 tour featured six shows in total. The first five events featured seven matches each with the final event featuring eight matches. Six of the matches were contested for championships owned by CMLL. The 2016 tour was the first time the joint show was held in Kōchi, Kōchi, while it had previously been held in the other three cities; Kyoto, Osaka and Tokyo.

== Background ==
The 2016 Fantastica Mania series was the sixth year in a row where Japanese wrestling promotion New Japan Pro-Wrestling (NJPW) had promoted a series of shows in Japan along with their Mexican partner promotion Consejo Mundial de Lucha Libre (CMLL). The 2016 series of shows were show 19 through 24, a total of six shows. The final three shows aired live on NJPW World. The opening show in Kōchi, Kōchi on January 17 would be the first time Fantastica Mania had taken place in the city. The tour was announced October 24, 2015, with the CMLL participants announced on November 16. The tour marks the NJPW debuts of Bobby Z, Dragon Lee, Guerrero Maya Jr., Hechicero, The Panther and Virus. Returning CMLL participants include Atlantis, Bárbaro Cavernario, Fuego, Mephisto, Místico, Okumura, Stuka Jr., Titán, Último Guerrero and Volador Jr. CMLL ring announcer Evan was also announced for the tour. Máscara Dorada, who signed with NJPW during the Fantastica Mania 2015 tour, would also take part in the 2016 tour. The most notable CMLL wrestlers missing the tour were Marco Corleone, La Máscara, Rush and La Sombra of Los Ingobernables. Three days after the CMLL participants were revealed, the reason for La Sombra missing the tour was announced; he had signed with WWE.

For the first time in Fantastica Mania history, the entire tour not only sold out, but did so a month in advance. The cards for all six events were released on January 6, 2016. It was announced that the events would mark NJPW rookies Sho Tanaka and Yohei Komatsu's final appearances for the promotion, before leaving on an indefinite learning excursion to CMLL. Meanwhile, the January 24 event would include Máscara Dorada's final match under a NJPW contract. The card for the final event was changed on January 23 with the addition of a title match featuring Kamaitachi, NJPW's previous rookie sent on a learning excursion. His surprise return on the January 23 event marked his first NJPW appearance since May 2013.

== Results ==
=== January 17 ===
No.	Results	Stipulations	Times
1	Kushida and Stuka Jr. defeated Sho Tanaka and Yohei Komatsu	Tag team match	09:01
2	Bobby Z and Okumura (with Mima Shimoda) defeated Guerrero Maya Jr. and The Panther	Tag team match	08:45
3	Fuego and Titán defeated Bárbaro Cavernario and Yoshi-Hashi	Tag team match	09:10
4	Hechicero and Virus defeated Dragon Lee and Jay White	Tag team match	09:55
5	Los Ingobernables de Japón (Bushi, Evil and Tetsuya Naito) defeated Atlantis, Juice Robinson and Máscara Dorada	Six-man tag team match	09:12
6	Ryusuke Taguchi and Volador Jr. defeated Mephisto and Shinsuke Nakamura	Tag team match	10:26
7	Hiroshi Tanahashi, Jyushin Thunder Liger and Místico defeated Gedo, Kazuchika Okada and Último Guerrero	Six-man tag team match	15:43

=== January 19 ===
No.	Results	Stipulations	Times
1	Fuego and Ryusuke Taguchi defeated Sho Tanaka and Yohei Komatsu	Tag team match	07:49
2	The Panther defeated Okumura (with Mima Shimoda)	Singles match	08:01
3	Guerrero Maya Jr. defeated Bobby Z	Singles match	06:18
4	David Finlay, Dragon Lee, Jyushin Thunder Liger and Titán defeated Bárbaro Cavernario, Hechicero, Virus and Yoshi-Hashi	Eight-man tag team match	09:21
5	Los Ingobernables de Japón (Bushi, Evil and Tetsuya Naito) defeated Atlantis, Máscara Dorada and Stuka Jr.	Six-man tag team match	07:16
6	Kushida and Místico defeated Gedo and Último Guerrero	Tag team match	09:39
7	Kazuchika Okada, Mephisto and Shinsuke Nakamura defeated Hiroshi Tanahashi, Juice Robinson and Volador Jr.	Six-man tag team match	15:21

=== January 20 ===
No.	Results	Stipulations	Times
1	Jyushin Thunder Liger and Stuka Jr. defeated Sho Tanaka and Yohei Komatsu	Tag team match	08:33
2	Bobby Z defeated The Panther	Singles match	08:14
3	Okumura (with Mima Shimoda) defeated Guerrero Maya Jr.	Singles match	08:12
4	Bárbaro Cavernario, Gedo, Hechicero and Yoshi-Hashi defeated Jay White, Kushida, Ryusuke Taguchi and Titán	Eight-man tag team match	09:43
5	Los Ingobernables de Japón (Bushi, Evil and Tetsuya Naito) defeated Atlantis, Fuego and Máscara Dorada	Six-man tag team match	11:01
6	Mephisto, Shinsuke Nakamura and Último Guerrero defeated Juice Robinson, Místico and Volador Jr.	Six-man tag team match	13:02
7	Dragon Lee and Hiroshi Tanahashi defeated Kazuchika Okada and Virus	Tag team match	15:47

=== January 22 ===
No.	Results	Stipulations	Times
1	Fuego and Stuka Jr. defeated Sho Tanaka and Yohei Komatsu	Tag team match	05:40
2	Bobby Z, Gedo, Hechicero, Okumura (with Mima Shimoda) and Yoshi-Hashi defeated David Finlay, Guerrero Maya Jr., Jyushin Thunder Liger, Kushida and The Panther	Ten-man tag team match	10:13
3	Los Ingobernables de Japón (Evil and Tetsuya Naito) defeated Atlantis and Juice Robinson	Tag team match	07:59
4	Bárbaro Cavernario (c) (with Hechicero) defeated Titán	Singles match for the Mexican National Welterweight Championship	10:57
5	Máscara Dorada (with Atlantis) defeated Bushi (c) (with Tetsuya Naito)	Singles match for the CMLL World Welterweight Championship	13:33
6	Kazuchika Okada, Shinsuke Nakamura and Virus defeated Dragon Lee, Hiroshi Tanahashi and Ryusuke Taguchi	Six-man tag team match	15:09
7	Mephisto and Último Guerrero defeated Místico and Volador Jr.	Tag team match	18:28
(c) / – the champion(s) heading into the match

=== January 23 ===
No.	Results	Stipulations	Times
1	Máscara Dorada and Titán defeated Sho Tanaka and Yohei Komatsu	Tag team match	07:38
2	Gedo, Hechicero and Yoshi-Hashi defeated Fuego, Juice Robinson and Kushida	Six-man tag team match	08:05
3	Guerrero Maya Jr. and The Panther (c) defeated Bobby Z and Okumura (with Mima Shimoda)	Tag team match for the Arena Coliseo Tag Team Championship	10:42
4	Bárbaro Cavernario and Shinsuke Nakamura defeated Ryusuke Taguchi and Stuka Jr.	Tag team match	07:41
5	Los Ingobernables de Japón (Bushi, Evil and Tetsuya Naito) defeated Atlantis, Jyushin Thunder Liger and Tiger Mask	Six-man tag team match	06:20
6	Dragon Lee (c) defeated Virus	Singles match for the CMLL World Lightweight Championship	07:05
7	Kazuchika Okada, Mephisto and Último Guerrero defeated Hiroshi Tanahashi, Místico and Volador Jr.	Six-man tag team match	15:45
(c) / – the champion(s) heading into the match

=== January 24 ===
No.	Results	Stipulations	Times
1	Guerrero Maya Jr. and The Panther defeated Sho Tanaka and Yohei Komatsu	Tag team match	05:10
2	Fuego, Kushida, Stuka Jr. and Tiger Mask defeated Bobby Z, Hechicero, Okumura (with Mima Shimoda) and Yoshi-Hashi	Eight-man tag team match	08:09
3	Jyushin Thunder Liger defeated Virus	Singles match	07:55
4	Los Ingobernables de Japón (Bushi, Evil and Tetsuya Naito) defeated Atlantis, Máscara Dorada and Ryusuke Taguchi	Six-man tag team match	07:23
5	Bárbaro Cavernario, Kazuchika Okada and Shinsuke Nakamura defeated Hiroshi Tanahashi, Juice Robinson and Titán	Six-man tag team match	13:06
6	Kamaitachi (with Okumura) defeated Dragon Lee (c) (with Stuka Jr.)	Singles match for the CMLL World Lightweight Championship	18:33
7	Místico defeated Último Guerrero	Singles match	17:23
8	Volador Jr. (c) (with Fuego) defeated Mephisto (with Virus)	Singles match for the NWA World Historic Welterweight Championship	21:06
(c) / – the champion(s) heading into the match

== See also ==
- 2016 in professional wrestling
