= Audaz (wrestler) =

Mexican professional wrestler

Personal information
- Born: Unrevealed; November 27, 1997 (age 28) Oaxaca, Oaxaca

Professional wrestling career
- Ring name(s): Chapulín; Fiero; Audaz
- Billed height: 1.70 m (5 ft 7 in)
- Billed weight: 80 kg (180 lb)
- Trained by: Furia Poblana; Virus; Arkángel de la Muerte; Último Guerrero
- Debut: 2011

Audaz (Spanish for "Audacious", born November 27, 1997, in Oaxaca City) is a Mexican professional wrestler working for the promotion Consejo Mundial de Lucha Libre (CMLL), portraying a tecnico ("Good guy") wrestling character. His real name is not a matter of public record, as is often the case with masked wrestlers in Mexico where their private lives are kept a secret from the wrestling fans.

His billed nickname is El Avión Humano (Spanish for The Human Plane).

His father was also a wrestler, going by the name Furia Poblana. Audaz also has a brother who has worked for CMLL occasionally in Guadalajara, and in IWRG among other places under the ring names Fire Man and later Ei Bi Ci (or Ei Bi Si). His uncle has also worked under the ring name Fiero.

== Career ==
Before getting into lucha libre, Audaz was a centre-back for Mexican football team Jaguares de Chiapas in their youth academy. He made his debut under the ring name Fiero in 2011.

=== Fiero (2011–2018) ===
After working locally for a few years, he made his way to Mexico City in 2015. He worked for International Wrestling Revolution Group (IWRG) and Toryumon México, a promotion ran by Último Dragón, as well as on the independent scene. Around this time he started training at the Consejo Mundial de Lucha Libre school.

In 2016 he would make his debut for Consejo Mundial de Lucha Libre, wrestling twice in July that year. He participated in an honorary multi-man elimination match for deceased wrestler Doctor X, as part of a showcase for students of Arkángel de la Muerte. He also worked an opening match in Arena México.

Throughout 2017 he wrestled frequently for the promotion, most often in the opening matches, impressing fans with his high-flying aerial style and creativity. In On Christmas Day in 2017 he participated in a Lucha de Apuestas-steel cage match at the annual CMLL Sin Salida event, marking his first appearance on a major show. Fiero escaped the cage and kept his mask in a match that was eventually lost by Hijo del Signo.

=== Audaz (2018–) ===
In 2018, CMLL changed his name and mask to that of Audaz. Audaz is a recycled character owned by CMLL. The original Audaz, whose real name was Doménico Bazán León was a great star for the promotion in the 1970s, as well as a musician and actor. He died in June 2020. Although the gimmick change sparked some criticism from fans, the original Audaz endorsed Fiero and approved of his in ring work, even though they never had the chance to meet in person.

He participated in Torneo Gran Alternativa (2018), with partner Kraneo. They were eliminated in the second round. Audaz would also appear at the CMLL Día de Muertos (2018) pay-per-view-event, as well as competing in the Leyenda de Plata (2018). On January 6, 2019, he wrestled in the annual CMLL Reyes del Aire, a multi-man tournament for aerial style wrestlers. Also in January 2019, Audaz was chosen as one of the CMLL representatives for the Fantastica Mania 2019 tour in Japan, where he worked opening multi-man matches often against Young Lions of New Japan Pro-Wrestling.

Throughout 2018 and 2019, Audaz had many matches against long term rival Templario, but they also teamed up in 2019 for the annual Parejas Increíbles tournament, where rivals team up to wrestle tag-team matches for a trophy. They were eliminated first round by Atlantis and Negro Casas. During 2019 he also began a rivalry with Kawato San (Master Wato, then on excursion in Mexico). In June 2019, Kawato defeated Audaz for the vacant CMLL World Lightweight Championship, after they both each won their respective qualifier matches. Later in 2019, Audaz would be in an elimination-match for the vacant CMLL World Welterweight Championship. He managed to survive until the last 4, when he was eliminated by the eventual winner Soberano Jr.

In January, he returned to Japan for Fantastica Mania 2020, where he once again worked tag-team and trios matches. In 2021, post-pandemic, Audaz would compete in a qualifier for a number one contendership for the Mexican National Trios Championship together with Los Atrapasueños, Rey Cometa and Espíritu Negro. The team were defeated first round. Later that same year, Audaz also competed for the Copa Independencia, a new tournament to celebrate 211 years of Mexican independence.

In January 2022, he once again competed in the Sin Salida steel-cage match for hairs or masks and survived. Disturbio lost his hair. The same year Audaz also competed in the annual Leyenda de Plata but was eliminated in the semi-final.

In January 2023 he suffered a motorcycle accident which resulted in several foot injuries. He kept on wrestling for CMLL after a recovery period of about two months but through this time he felt he couldn't do himself justice in the ring until the summer of 2023.

In 2023 he participated in a tournament for the vacated Mexican National Middleweight Championship, but was eliminated by Guerrero Maya Jr. in the first qualifier. September 1, 2023, he once again competed for the Copa Independencia. In September 2023, during the first edition of Fantastica Mania in the United Kingdom, a collaboration with British promotion Revolution Pro Wrestling, Audaz was chosen as one of the CMLL representatives in what was CMLL's first ever official event in the United Kingdom. Throughout the event he worked trios matches where he teamed with Ricky Knight Jr. and Zak Knight and on the first show. They managed to defeat the team of Kid Lykos, Kid Lykos II and Sangre Imperial. On the second show, however, they were defeated by Shigeo Okumura, Wild Boar and Sangre Imperial.
