= Fantastica Mania 2018 =

Japanese/Mexican professional wrestling show series

- 2018 poster showing both CMLL and NJPW competitors on the tour
- Promotion: Consejo Mundial de Lucha Libre; New Japan Pro-Wrestling
- Date: January 12, 2018; January 14, 2018; January 15, 2018; January 16, 2018; January 17, 2018; January 19, 2018; January 21, 2018; January 22, 2018
- City: Nagoya; Kyoto; Takamatsu; Osaka; Toyama; Tokyo
- Attendance: 1554 (Jan 12)

Event chronology
← Previous; 2017	Next → 2019

Consejo Mundial de Lucha Libre event chronology
← Previous; Sin Piedad	Next → Torneo Nacional de Parejas Increíbles

New Japan Pro-Wrestling event chronology
← Previous; New Year Dash!!	Next → Road to The New Beginning

Fantastica Mania 2018 was a professional wrestling tour, co-produced by the Japanese New Japan Pro-Wrestling (NJPW) promotion and the Mexican Consejo Mundial de Lucha Libre (CMLL) promotion. The tour took place between January 12 and 22, 2018, with shows taking place in Nagoya, Kyoto, Takamatsu, Osaka, Toyama and Tokyo, Japan. The 2018 tour was the eight time that NJPW and CMLL co-promoted shows in Japan under the Fantastica Mania name. With eight shows, the 2018 tour was the longest in Fantastica Mania history. The shows generally featured seven matches each night, with several shows being shown at least in part on SamuraiTV, and the last three shows were shown in full as part of the NJPW World streaming content.

The eight shows featured a total of 66 matches, four of which for CMLL championships including Soberano Jr., Niebla Roja and Volador Jr. successfully defending their championships, and El Cuatrero defeating Ángel de Oro to win the CMLL World Middleweight Championship. The focal point of the last two show was the "CMLL Brothers tag team tournament, won by Gran Guerrero and Último Guerrero, that also included El Cuatrero/Sansón, Ángel de Oro/Niebla Roja, and Dragon Lee/Místico.

== Background ==
The 2018 Fantastica Mania tour was the eight year in a row where Japanese wrestling promotion New Japan Pro-Wrestling (NJPW) promoted a series of shows with their Mexican partner promotion Consejo Mundial de Lucha Libre (CMLL). Due to the co-promotional nature of the shows, they rarely feature any development in ongoing NJPW or CMLL storylines, instead of focusing on inter-promotional matches. Negro Casas had originally been announced as a participant, but he was injured during a match against Sam Adonis as CMLLs Sin Piedad event on January 1. NJPW main-stay Rocky Romero took Casas' place on the tour.

== Results ==
=== January 12 ===
No.	Results	Stipulations	Times
1	Drone defeated Disturbio	Singles match	06:53
2	Okumura and Puma (with Mima Shimoda) defeated Fuego and Star Jr.	Tag Team match	09:44
3	Chaos (Rocky Romero, SHO and YOH) and El Cuatrero defeated Ángel de Oro, Jushin Thunder Liger, Ryusuke Taguchi and Tiger Mask	Eight-man tag team match	09:41
4	Soberano Jr., Niebla Roja and Volador Jr. defeated Bárbaro Cavernario, Gran Guerrero and Sansón	Six-man tag team match	09:26
5	Los Ingobernables de Japón (BUSHI, Hiromu Takahashi and Tetsuya Naito) and Rush defeated Dragon Lee, Hirai Kawato, KUSHIDA and Satoshi Kojima	Eight-man tag team match	12:45
6	Atlantis, Hiroshi Tanahashi and Místico defeated Chaos (Gedo and Kazuchika Okada) and Último Guerrero	Six-man tag team match	10:57

=== January 14 ===
No.	Results	Stipulations	Times
1	Star Jr. defeated Disturbio	Singles match	06:22
2	Okumura and Sansón (with Mima Shimoda) defeated Soberano Jr. and Fuego	Tag Team match	12:07
3	Chaos (Rocky Romero, SHO and YOH) and Puma defeated Drone, Jushin Thunder Liger, KUSHIDA and Tiger Mask	Eight-man tag team match	12:18
4	Ángel de Oro, Atlantis and Volador Jr. defeated Bárbaro Cavernario, El Cuatrero and Gedo	Six-man tag team match	11:13
5	Los Ingobernables de Japón (BUSHI Hiromu Takahashi and Tetsuya Naito) and Rush defeated Dragon Lee, Hirai Kawato, Ryusuke Taguchi and Satoshi Kojima	Eight-man tag team match	14:03
6	Gran Guerrero, Kazuchika Okada and Último Guerrero defeated Hiroshi Tanahashi, Místico and Niebla Roja	Six-man tag team match	14:49

=== January 15 ===
No.	Results	Stipulations	Times
1	Drone defeated Puma	Singles match	07:17
2	Ángel de Oro and Star Jr. defeated Disturbio and El Cuatrero	Tag Team match	10:45
3	Fuego, Jushin Thunder Liger, Ryusuke Taguchi and Tiger Mask defeated Chaos (Rocky Romero, SHO and YOH) and Okumura (with Mima Shimoda)	Eight-man tag team match	10:12
4	Bárbaro Cavernario, Sansón and Ultimo Último Guerrero defeated Soberano Jr., Místico and Volador Jr.	Six-man tag team match	13:01
5	Los Ingobernables de Japón (BUSHI, Hiromu Takahashi and Tetsuya Naito) and Rush defeated Dragon Lee, Hirai Kawato, KUSHIDA and Satoshi Kojima	Eight-man tag team match	12:42
6	Atlantis, Hiroshi Tanahashi and Niebla Roja defeated Chaos (Gedo and Kazuchika Okada) and Gran Guerrero	Six-man tag team match	12:36

=== January 16 ===
No.	Results	Stipulations	Times
1	Drone and Star Jr. defeated Disturbio and Puma	Tag Team match	07:30
2	Soberano Jr., Jushin Thunder Liger, Ryusuke Taguchi and Tiger Mask defeated Chaos (Rocky Romero, SHO and YOH) and Sansón	Eight-man tag team match	10:52
3	El Cuatrero and Okumura (with Mima Shimoda) defeated Ángel de Oro and Fuego	Tag Team match	08:28
4	Los Ingobernables de Japón (BUSHI and Hiromu Takahashi) defeated Dragon Lee and Hirai Kawato	Tag Team match	11:31
5	Gran Guerrero and Último Guerrero defeated Místico and Niebla Roja	Tag Team match	10:46
6	KUSHIDA and Satoshi Kojima defeated Los Ingobernables (Rush and Tetsuya Naito)	Tag Team match	13:58
7	Chaos (Gedo and Kazuchika Okada) and Bárbaro Cavernario defeated Atlantis, Hiroshi Tanahashi and Volador Jr.	Six-man tag team match	12:23

=== January 17 ===
No.	Results	Stipulations	Times
1	Disturbio defeated Star Jr.	Singles match	08:33
2	Okumura and Puma (with Mima Shimoda) defeated Drone and Fuego	Tag Team match	08:45
3	Chaos (Rocky Romero, SHO and YOH) and Sansón defeated Soberano Jr., Jushin Thunder Liger, KUSHIDA and Tiger Mask	Eight-man tag team match	12:09
4	Ángel de Oro, Atlantis and Niebla Roja defeated El Cuatrero, Gedo and Gran Guerrero	Six-man tag team match	11:01
5	Los Ingobernables de Japón (BUSHI, Hiromu Takahashi and Tetsuya Naito, Rush) defeated Dragon Lee, Hirai Kawato, Ryusuke Taguchi and Satoshi Kojima	Eight-man tag team match	14:22
6	Hiroshi Tanahashi, Místico and Volador Jr. defeated Bárbaro Cavernario, Kazuchika Okada and Último Guerrero	Six-man tag team match	11:51

=== January 19 ===
No.	Results	Stipulations	Times
1	Okumura (with Mima Shimoda) defeated Fuego	Singles match	06:45
2	Los Ingobernables de Japón (BUSHI, Hiromu Takahashi and Tetsuya Naito) and Rush defeated Dragon Lee, Hirai Kawato, Satoshi Kojima and Star Jr.	Eight-man tag team match	15:46
3	Disturbio, Bárbaro Cavernario, Puma and Último Guerrero defeated Atlantis, Drone, Místico and Volador Jr.	Eight-man tag team match	12:33
4	El Cuatrero defeated Ángel de Oro (c)	Singles match for the CMLL World Middleweight Championship Match	11:43
5	Soberano Jr. (c) defeated Sansón	Singles match for the Mexican National Welterweight Championship Match	11:47
6	Niebla Roja (c) defeated Gran Guerrero	Singles match for the CMLL World Light Heavyweight Championship	16:18
(c) / – the champion(s) heading into the match

=== January 21 ===
No.	Results	Stipulations	Times
1	Disturbio and Puma defeated Drone and Star Jr.	Tag Team match	09:16
2	Soberano Jr., Fuego and Ryusuke Taguchi defeated Roppongi 3K (SHO and YOH) and Okumura (with Mima Shimoda)	Six-man tag team match	11:06
3	Los Ingobernables de Japón (BUSHI, Hiromu Takahashi and Tetsuya Naito) and Rush defeated Atlantis, Hirai Kawato, KUSHIDA and Satoshi Kojima	Eight-man tag team match	11:58
4	Gran Guerrero and Último Guerrero defeated Ángel de Oro and Niebla Roja	CMLL Brothers Tag Tournament first round match	15:22
5	Dragon Lee and Místico defeated Nueva Generacion Dinaita (El Cuatrero and Sansón)	CMLL Brothers Tag Tournament first round match	10:25
6	Volador Jr. (c) defeated Bárbaro Cavernario	Singles match for the NWA World Historic Welterweight Championship Match	22:07
(c) / – the champion(s) heading into the match

=== January 22 ===
No.	Results	Stipulations	Times
1	Fuego and Ryusuke Taguchi defeated Disturbio and Puma	Tag Team match	08:52
2	Chaos (Rocky Romero, SHO and YOH) and Okumura (with Mima Shimoda) defeated KUSHIDA, Jushin Thunder Liger, Star Jr. and Tiger Mask	Eight-man tag team match	10:59
3	Nueva Generacion Dinaita (El Cuatrero and Sansón) defeated Ángel de Oro and Niebla Roja	CMLL Brothers Tag Tournament third place match	09:30
4	Bárbaro Cavernario and Gedo defeated Atlantis and Hirai Kawato	Tag Team match	09:14
5	Los Ingobernables de Japón (BUSHI, Hiromu Takahashi and Tetsuya Naito) defeated Drone, Soberano Jr. and Volador Jr.	Six-man tag team match	08:37
6	Rush defeated Satoshi Kojima	Singles match	10:11
7	Gran Guerrero and Último Guerrero defeated Dragon Lee and Místico	CMLL Brothers Tag Tournament final match	18:42

== See also ==
- 2018 in professional wrestling
