= Fantastica Mania 2013 =

Japanese/Mexican professional wrestling show series

- Promotional poster featuring CMLL wrestlers taking part in the events.
- Promotion(s): Consejo Mundial de Lucha Libre; New Japan Pro-Wrestling
- Date: January 18, 2013; January 19, 2013; January 20, 2013
- City: Tokyo, Japan
- Venue: Korakuen Hall
- Attendance: 1,650 (January 18); 1,750 (January 19); 1,950 (January 20)

Event chronology
| ← Previous; 2012 | Next → 2014 |

Consejo Mundial de Lucha Libre event chronology
| ← Previous; Pequeños Reyes del Aire | Next → Reyes del Aire |

New Japan Pro-Wrestling event chronology
| ← Previous; Wrestle Kingdom 7 | Next → The New Beginning |

Fantastica Mania 2013 is the name of three professional wrestling major shows that took place on January 18, 19 and 20, 2013 in Korakuen Hall in Tokyo, Japan. The event was the third ever co-promoted events between Japanese New Japan Pro-Wrestling (NJPW) and the Mexican Consejo Mundial de Lucha Libre (CMLL) and featured matches with wrestlers from both promotions. 2013 was the first year that Fantastica Mania included three dates, compared to only two previously. The events featured title defenses of both CMLL and NJPW championships.

== Background ==
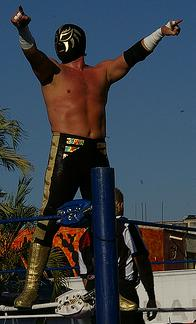
La Sombra, participated in headlining matches on all three shows.

The events featured six or seven professional wrestling matches on each event with different wrestlers involved in pre-existing scripted feuds or storylines. Wrestlers portray either villains (referred to as heels in general or rudos in Mexico) or fan favorites (Faces or técnicos in Mexico) as they compete in wrestling matches with pre-determined outcomes.

Consejo Mundial de Lucha Libre (CMLL) wrestler Titán was the first man announced for the show, as he earned his spot by winning the En Busca de un Ídolo ("In search of an idol") tournament. Rey Bucanero was originally announced as part of the shows, but on December 19, 2012, New Japan announced that he had been sidelined with a knee injury and would be replaced by Rey Escorpión on the shows. On January 15, 2013, New Japan announced that Místico II would be unable to wrestle at the events due to a dislocated shoulder, but would still attend to sign autographs. His spot in the matches would be filled by Atlantis. The matches were not rearranged due to the substitution but instead simply had Atlantis substitute Mistico without considering ongoing CMLL storylines.

== Results ==
=== January 18 ===
| No. | Results | Stipulations | Times |
|---|---|---|---|
| 1 | Tama Tonga (NJPW) and Titán (CMLL) defeated Euforia (CMLL) and Okumura (CMLL) (with Mima Shimoda) | Tag team match | 08:17 |
| 2 | Rey Escorpión (CMLL), Tomohiro Ishii (NJPW) and Yujiro Takahashi (NJPW) defeated Bushi, Diamante (CMLL) and Ryusuke Taguchi (NJPW) | Six-man tag team match | 08:29 |
| 3 | Rush (CMLL) defeated Yoshi-Hashi (NJPW) | Singles match | 11:08 |
| 4 | Taichi (NJPW), Taka Michinoku (NJPW) and Volador Jr. (CMLL) defeated La Máscara (CMLL), Máscara Dorada (CMLL) and Máximo (CMLL) | Six-man tag team match | 09:38 |
| 5 | Gedo (NJPW), Jado (NJPW) and Mephisto (CMLL) defeated Atlantis (CMLL), Jyushin Thunder Liger (NJPW) and Tiger Mask (NJPW) | Six-man tag team match | 11:21 |
| 6 | Prince Devitt (NJPW) defeated Dragón Rojo Jr. (CMLL) | Singles match | 10:21 |
| 7 | Hiroshi Tanahashi (NJPW) and La Sombra (CMLL) defeated Misterioso Jr. (CMLL) and Shinsuke Nakamura (NJPW) | "Black Cat Memorial Match" tag team match | 13:41 |

=== January 19 ===
| No. | Results | Stipulations | Times |
|---|---|---|---|
| 1 | Máximo (CMLL) and Tama Tonga (NJPW) defeated Suzuki-gun (Taichi (NJPW) and Taka Michinoku (NJPW)) | Tag team match | 10:07 |
| 2 | Gedo (NJPW), Jado (NJPW) and Misterioso Jr. (CMLL) defeated Jyushin Thunder Liger (NJPW), Tiger Mask (NJPW) and Titán (CMLL) | Six man tag team match | 09:42 |
| 3 | Mephisto (CMLL) and Okumura (CMLL) defeated Diamante (CMLL) and Máscara Dorada (CMLL) | Tag team match | 09:38 |
| 4 | Dragón Rojo Jr. (CMLL), Tomohiro Ishii (NJPW) and Yoshi-Hashi (NJPW) defeated Bushi (NJPW), Prince Devitt (NJPW) and Ryusuke Taguchi (NJPW) | Six-man tag team match | 09:29 |
| 5 | Atlantis (CMLL) defeated Euforia (CMLL) | Singles match | 07:30 |
| 6 | Kazuchika Okada (NJPW), Rey Escorpión (CMLL) and Volador Jr. (CMLL) defeated Hiroshi Tanahashi (NJPW), La Máscara (CMLL) and Rush (CMLL) | Six-man tag team match | 10:44 |
| 7 | Shinsuke Nakamura (c) (NJPW) defeated La Sombra (CMLL) | Singles match for the IWGP Intercontinental Championship | 13:29 |
(c) / – the champion(s) heading into the match

=== January 20 ===
| No. | Results | Stipulations | Times |
|---|---|---|---|
| 1 | Taichi (NJPW) defeated Máximo (CMLL) | Singles match | 08:40 |
| 2 | Tomohiro Ishii (NJPW) defeated Bushi (NJPW), Diamante (CMLL), Gedo (NJPW), Jado (NJPW), Jyushin Thunder Liger (NJPW), Máscara Dorada (CMLL), Misterioso Jr. (CMLL), Okumura (CMLL), Tiger Mask (NJPW), Titán (CMLL) and Yoshi-Hashi (NJPW) | 12-man Torneo cibernetico elimination match | 19:41 |
| 3 | Rush (CMLL) defeated Rey Escorpión (CMLL) | Singles match | 09:38 |
| 4 | La Sombra (CMLL) defeated Dragón Rojo Jr. (CMLL) (c) | Singles match for the NWA World Historic Welterweight Championship | 11:58 |
| 5 | La Máscara (CMLL) (c) defeated Volador Jr. (CMLL) | Singles match for the Mexican National Light Heavyweight Championship | 14:40 |
| 6 | Atlantis (CMLL), Hiroshi Tanahashi (NJPW) and Prince Devitt (NJPW) defeated Euforia (CMLL), Kazuchika Okada (NJPW) and Mephisto (CMLL) | Six man tag team match | 09:58 |
(c) / – the champion(s) heading into the match

Torneo cibernetico elimination order

| Order | Wrestler | Eliminated by | Time |
|---|---|---|---|
| 1 | Gedo | Jyushin Thunder Liger | 07:32 |
| 2 | Jyushin Thunder Liger | Misterioso Jr. | 07:49 |
| 3 | Misterioso Jr. | Titán | 08:49 |
| 4 | Titán | Jado | 09:55 |
| 5 | Jado | Tiger Mask | 10:47 |
| 6 | Diamante | Okumura | 11:33 |
| 7 | Okumura | Máscara Dorada | 12:27 |
| 8 | Máscara Dorada | Yoshi-Hashi | 13:55 |
| 9 | Yoshi-Hashi | Tiger Mask | 14:53 |
| 10 | Tiger Mask | Tomohiro Ishii | 16:43 |
| 11 | Bushi | Tomohiro Ishii | 19:41 |
| 12 | Tomohiro Ishii | Winner | 19:41 |

== See also ==
- 2013 in professional wrestling
