= Fantastica Mania 2012 =

Japanese/Mexican professional wrestling show series

- Promotional poster for the event
- Promotion(s): Consejo Mundial de Lucha Libre; New Japan Pro-Wrestling
- Date: January 21, 2012; January 22, 2012
- City: Tokyo, Japan
- Venue: Korakuen Hall
- Attendance: 1,950 (January 21); 1,950 (January 22)

Event chronology
← Previous; 2011	Next → 2013

Consejo Mundial de Lucha Libre event chronology
← Previous; Sin Piedad	Next → Reyes del Aire

New Japan Pro-Wrestling event chronology
← Previous; Wrestle Kingdom VI in Tokyo Dome	Next → The New Beginning

Fantastica Mania 2012 was the name of two professional wrestling major shows produced that took place on January 21 and January 22, 2012 in Korakuen Hall in Tokyo, Japan. The event was the second ever co-promoted events between Japanese New Japan Pro-Wrestling (NJPW) and the Mexican Consejo Mundial de Lucha Libre (CMLL) and featured matches with wrestlers from both promotions.

The main event of the first night, a tag team match, where New Japan wrestler Kazuchika Okada and CMLL wrestler Volador Jr. defeated IWGP Heavyweight Champion Hiroshi Tanahashi and NWA World Historic Welterweight Champion La Sombra, built to not only Volador Jr. challenging for the NWA World Historic Welterweight Championship on the second night, but also to Okada challenging for the IWGP Heavyweight Championship on February 12 at New Japan's The New Beginning pay-per-view. The first night also featured New Japan wrestler Kushida submitting CMLL World Welterweight Champion Máscara Dorada on his way to a title match on the second night, and an appearance from CMLL World Women's Champion Ayumi Kurihara. During the second night both Máscara Dorada and La Sombra successfully defended their CMLL championships.

== Background ==
Each of the events featured six professional wrestling matches, some with different wrestlers involved in pre-existing scripted feuds or storylines while other matches were the first time some wrestlers faced off. The Fantastica Mania events was the result of several years of co-operation between New Japan Pro-Wrestling and Consejo Mundial de Lucha Libre, which had seen both companies exchange wrestlers for various events.

== Results ==
=== January 21 ===
No.	Results	Stipulations	Times
1	Suzuki-gun (Taichi and Taka Michinoku) defeated Danshoku Dino and Máximo	Tag team match	08:04
2	Okumura and Yoshi-Hashi (with Mima Shimoda) defeated King Fale and Tama Tonga	Tag team match	11:27
3	Prince Devitt, Ryusuke Taguchi and Tiger Mask defeated Gedo, Jado and Misterioso Jr.	Six-man tag team match	12:50
4	Hirooki Goto and Kushida defeated Máscara Dorada and Rush	Tag team match	10:24
5	Diamante, Jyushin Thunder Liger and Tetsuya Naito defeated Mephisto, Shinsuke Nakamura, Yujiro Takahashi	"Black Cat Memorial Match" Six man tag team match	13:33
6	Kazuchika Okada and Volador Jr. defeated Hiroshi Tanahashi and La Sombra	Tag team match	12:33

=== January 22 ===
No.	Results	Stipulations	Times
1	Prince Devitt, Ryusuke Taguchi, Tama Tonga and Tiger Mask defeated Gedo, Jado, Okumura and Yoshi-Hashi (with Mima Shimoda)	Eight-man tag team match	10:11
2	Jyushin Thunder Liger and Máximo defeated Misterioso Jr. and Taichi	Tag team match	08:15
3	Máscara Dorada (c) defeated Kushida	Singles match for the CMLL World Welterweight Championship	13:22
4	Hirooki Goto defeated Rush	Singles match	09:49
5	Kazuchika Okada, Mephisto and Shinsuke Nakamura defeated Diamante, Hiroshi Tanahashi and Tetsuya Naito	Six-man tag team match	14:24
6	La Sombra (c) defeated Volador Jr.	Singles match for the NWA World Historic Welterweight Championship	21:47
(c) / – the champion(s) heading into the match

== See also ==
- 2012 in professional wrestling
