= Fantastica Mania 2011 =

Japanese/Mexican professional wrestling show series

- Official poster for the January 23rd Fantastica Mania
- Promotion: Consejo Mundial de Lucha Libre / New Japan Pro-Wrestling
- Date: January 22, 2011; January 23, 2011
- City: Tokyo, Japan
- Venue: Korakuen Hall
- Attendance: 1,800 (January 22); 2,005 (January 23)

Event chronology
← Previous; First	Next → 2012

Consejo Mundial de Lucha Libre event chronology
← Previous; Reyes del Aire	Next → Pequeños Reyes del Aire

New Japan Pro-Wrestling event chronology
← Previous; Wrestle Kingdom V in Tokyo Dome	Next → The New Beginning

Fantastica Mania 2011 was the name of two professional wrestling major shows produced that took place on January 22 and January 23, 2011, in Korakuen Hall in Tokyo, Japan. The event was the first ever co-promoted events between Japanese New Japan Pro-Wrestling (NJPW) and the Mexican Consejo Mundial de Lucha Libre (CMLL) and features matches with wrestlers from both promotions and both NJPW and CMLL championships being defended.

On the first night NJPW wrestler Ryusuke Taguchi defeated Máscara Dorada to win the CMLL World Welterweight Championship, marking the first time that a NJPW wrestler had won that particular title. Night one also saw NJPW representatives successfully defend the CMLL World Middleweight Championship and the IWGP Tag Team Championship against CMLL challengers. On night two La Sombra, Máscara Dorada and La Mascara successfully defended the CMLL World Trios Championship on the undercard while Apollo 55 (Prince Devitt and Ryusuke Taguchi) defeated Golden☆Lovers (Kota Ibushi and Kenny Omega) bringing the IWGP Junior Heavyweight Tag Team Championship back to the promotion after being held by the DDT team since October 2010. Also on night two Tiger Mask defeated longtime rival Tomohiro Ishii in a Lucha de Apuestas, forcing Ishii to have his hair shaved off.

== Background ==
Each of the events featured six professional wrestling matches, some with different wrestlers involved in pre-existing scripted feuds or storylines while other matches were the first time some wrestlers faced off. The Fantastica Mania events was the result of several years of co-operation between New Japan Pro-Wrestling and Consejo Mundial de Lucha Libre, which had seen both companies exchange wrestlers for various events.

== Results ==
=== January 22 ===
No.	Results	Stipulations	Times
1	Taichi defeated Máximo	Singles match	12:39
2	Ryusuke Taguchi defeated Máscara Dorada (c) – two falls to one	Two out of three falls match for the CMLL World Welterweight Championship	11:20
3	Jyushin Thunder Liger (c) defeated La Sombra – two falls to one	Two out of three falls match for the CMLL World Middleweight Championship	16:28
4	Bad Intentions (Karl Anderson and Giant Bernard) (c) defeated Atlantis and Okumura	Tag Team match for the IWGP Tag Team Championship	13:06
5	Dragón Rojo, Jr. and Tomohiro Ishii defeated La Máscara and Tiger Mask	Tag Team match	10:06
6	Shinsuke Nakamura, Tetsuya Naito and Averno defeated Hiroshi Tanahashi, Prince Devitt and Místico	"Black Cat Memorial Match" Six-man tag team match	14:33
(c) / – the champion(s) heading into the match

=== January 23 ===
No.	Results	Stipulations	Times
1	Jado and Gedo defeated Danshoku Dino and Máximo	Tag Team match	10:39
2	Bad Intentions (Karl Anderson and Giant Bernard) and Jyushin Thunder Liger defeated Atlantis, Dragón Rojo, Jr. and Taichi	Six-man tag team match	11:08
3	La Generacion Dorada (La Sombra, Máscara Dorada and La Máscara) (c) defeated La Ola Amarillo (Yujiro Takahashi, Tetsuya Naito and Okumura)	Two out of three falls six-man tag team match for the CMLL World Trios Championship	24:27
4	Tiger Mask defeated Tomohiro Ishii	Lucha de Apuestas, mask vs. hair match	12:16
5	Místico defeated Averno – two falls to one	Two out of three falls match	16:50
6	Apollo 55 (Prince Devitt and Ryusuke Taguchi) defeated Golden☆Lovers (Kota Ibushi and Kenny Omega) (c)	Tag Team match for the IWGP Junior Heavyweight Tag Team Championship	16:32
(c) / – the champion(s) heading into the match

== See also ==
- 2011 in professional wrestling
