= Torneo Gran Alternativa (2019) =

Mexican professional wrestling tournament

- Poster for the October 18 tournament final show
- Promotion: Consejo Mundial de Lucha Libre
- Date: October 4, 2019; October 11, 2019; October 19, 2019
- City: Mexico City, Mexico
- Venue: Arena México
- Tagline(s): El Trampolín al Estrellato ("The springboard to the stars")

Event chronology
← Previous; CMLL 86th Anniversary Show	Next → CMLL Día de Muertos

Torneo Gran Alternativa chronology
← Previous; 2018	Next → 2020

The Torneo Gran Alternativa 2019 was professional wrestling tournament produced by the Mexican wrestling promotion Consejo Mundial de Lucha Libre (CMLLl; Spanish "World Wrestling Council") that ran from October 4, 2019, over the course of three of CMLL's Friday night shows in Arena México, and end of October 18. The Torneo Gran Alternativa (Great alternative tournament) concept sees a Novato or rookie team up with an experienced wrestler for a tag team tournament. The rookie winner is often elevated up the ranks of CMLL as a result of winning the tournament, but there is no specific "prize" for winning the tournament beyond a symbolic trophy.

The 2019 tournament was the 24th Gran Alternativa tournament that CMLL has held since its inception in 1994. Block A saw rookie Fugaz and veteran Místico qualify for the finals. Rookie Star Jr. and veteran Valiente won block B to set up the finals for October 18, which were won by Star Jr. and Valiente

== History ==
Starting in 1994 the Mexican professional wrestling promotion Consejo Mundial de Lucha Libre (CMLL) created a special tournament concept where they would team up a novato, or rookie, with a veteran for a single-elimination tag team tournament. The tournament was called El Torneo Gran Alternativa, or "The Great Alternative Tournament" and became a recurring event on the CMLL calendar. CMLL did not hold a Gran Alternativa tournament in 1997 and 2000 held on each year from 2001 through 2014, opting not to hold a tournament in 2015. The 2019 Gran Alternativa tournament was the 21st overall Gran Alternativa tournament. All tournaments have been held in Arena México, CMLL's main venue and has taken place on Friday nights, with the 2016 tournament being the only time the Gran Alternativa was held on Tuesday nights. The 2019 Gran Alternativa tournament was the 24th tournament held by CMLL in the 25 years since the first installment.

== Tournament background ==
The tournament featured 15 professional wrestling matches with different wrestlers teaming up, some of which were involved in pre-existing scripted feuds or storylines while others are simply paired up for the tournament. Wrestlers portrayed either villains (referred to as Rudos in Mexico) or fan favorites (Técnicos in Mexico) as they competed in wrestling matches with pre-determined outcomes. The tournament format follows CMLL's traditional tournament formats, with two qualifying blocks of eight teams that compet in the first and second week of the tournament and a final match between the two block winners. The qualifying blocks are one-fall matches while the tournament finals is a best two-out-of-three-falls tag team match. Each qualifying block starts with all 8 Novatos competing in a "seeding" battle royal to determine the brackets for the block.

Gran Alternativa participants

Block	Rookie	Veteran	Ref(s)
Block A	Arkalis	Stuka Jr.	
Block A	El Coyote	El Terrible	
Block A	Difunto	Último Guerrero	
Block A	Dulce Gardenia	Volador Jr.	
Block A	Espíritu Negro	Mr. Niebla	
Block A	Fugaz	Místico	
Block A	Grako	Mephisto	
Block A	Retro	Diamante Azul	
Block B	Akuma	Euforia	
Block B	Espanto Jr.	Bárbaro Cavernario	
Block B	Furia Roja	Gran Guerrero	
Block B	Magia Blanca	Niebla Roja	
Block B	Sonic	Ángel de Oro	
Block B	Súper Astro Jr.	Titán	
Block B	Star Jr.	Valiente	
Block B	Yago	Negro Casas	

Of all Group A participants, only El Coyote and Espíritu Negro had participated in previous Gran Alternativa tournaments, in 2018 and 2014 respectively. The remaining six rookies made their tournament debut in 2019. Four of the eight veterans in Group A had previously won one or more Gran Alternativa tournaments. Último Guerrero has won three (1999, 2008 and 2011), the first as a rookie and the remaining as a veteran. Volador Jr. has won the second most tournaments, winning both the 2018 and the 2016 tournaments. El Terrible won the 2012 tournament and Mr. Niebla won the 2014 tournaments, While Diamante Azul, Mephisto, Místico, and Stuka Jr. have all participated before but never won the tournament.

== Tournament ==
=== Tournament brackets ===
Round of 16
El Coyote and El Terrible	W
Grako and Mephisto
Dulce Gardenia and Volador Jr.	W
Espíritu Negro and Mr. Niebla
Fugaz and Místico	W
Arkalis and Stuka Jr.
Difunto and Último Guerrero	W
Retro and Diamante Azul
Bárbaro Cavernario & Espanto Jr.	W
Sonic and Ángel de Oro
Súper Astro Jr. and Titán	W
Yago and Negro Casas
Furia Roja and Gran Guerrero	W
Magia Blanca and Niebla Roja
Star Jr. and Valiente	W
Akuma and Euforia

Quarterfinals
El Coyote and El Terrible
Dulce Gardenia and Volador Jr.	W
Fugaz and Místico	W
Difunto and Último Guerrero
Espanto Jr. and Bárbaro Cavernario	W
Súper Astro Jr. and Titán
Furia Roja and Gran Guerrero
Star Jr. and Valiente	W

Semifinals
Dulce Gardenia and Volador Jr.
Fugaz and Místico	W
Espanto Jr. and Bárbaro Cavernario
Star Jr. and Valiente	W

Finals
Fugaz and Místico
Star Jr. and Valiente	W

=== Tournament shows ===
==== October 4 Super Viernes ====
No.	Results	Stipulations	Times
1	La Seductora and Reyna Isis defeated La Magnifica and Silueta	Best two-out-of-three falls tag team match	16:47
2	Esfinge, Guerrero Maya Jr., and Rey Cometa defeated Dark Magic, Okumura, and Vangellys	Six-man "Lucha Libre rules" tag team match	15:37
3	Templario defeated Soberano Jr.	Singles match	14:02
4	Bárbaro Cavernario, El Cuatrero, and El Hijo del Villano III defeated Flyer, Titán, and Valiente	Six-man "Lucha Libre rules" tag team match	13:02
5	Retro and Difunto defeated Arkalis, El Coyote, Dulce Gardenia, Espíritu Negro, Grako, Retro, and Fugaz	Gran Alternativa 2019 seeding battle royal	03:57
6	El Coyote and El Terrible defeated Grako and Mephisto	Gran Alternativa 2019 first round tag team match	06:18
7	Dulce Gardenia and Volador Jr. defeated Espíritu Negro and Mr. Niebla	Gran Alternativa 2019 first round tag team match	06:41
8	Fugaz and Místico defeated Arkalis and Stuka Jr.	Gran Alternativa 2019 first round tag team match	03:56
9	Difunto and Último Guerrero defeated Retro and Diamante Azul	Gran Alternativa 2019 first round tag team match	02:11
10	Dulce Gardenia and Volador Jr. defeated El Coyote and El Terrible	Gran Alternativa 2019 Quarter final tag team match	04:22
11	Fugaz and Místico defeated Difunto and Último Guerrero	Gran Alternativa 2019 Quarter final tag team match	02:05
12	Fugaz and Místico defeated Dulce Gardenia and Volador Jr.	Gran Alternativa 2019 Semi-final tag team match	07:03
13	Los Guerreros del Infierno (Euforia and Gran Guerrero) (c) defeated Los Hermanos Chávez (Ángel de Oro and Niebla Roja)	Best two-out-of-three falls tag team match for the CMLL World Tag Team Championship	12:14
(c) / – the champion(s) heading into the match

==== October 11 Super Viernes ====
No.	Results	Stipulations	Times
1	Espíritu Negro and Grako defeated Eléctrico and Príncipe Diamante	Best two-out-of-three falls tag team match	04:49
2	Átomo, El Gallito, and Microman defeated Chamuel, El Guapito, and Perico Zacarías by disqualification	Six-man "Lucha Libre rules" tag team match	13:19
3	El Felino defeated Rey Cometa	Lighting match (Singles match, 10 minute time limit)	07:30
4	Atlantis, Atlantis Jr., and Audaz defeated Hechicero, El Hijo del Villano III, and Mr. Niebla	Six-man "Lucha Libre rules" tag team match	10:07
5	Akuma and Star Jr. defeated Espanto Jr., Furia Roja, Magia Blanca, Sonic., Súper Astro Jr. and Yago	Gran Alternativa 2019 seeding battle royal	01:50
6	Espanto Jr. and Bárbaro Cavernario defeated Sonic and Ángel de Oro	Gran Alternativa 2019 first round tag team match	06:09
7	Súper Astro Jr. and Titán defeated Yago and Negro Casas	Gran Alternativa 2019 first round tag team match	06:13
8	Furia Roja and Gran Guerrero defeated Magia Blanca and Niebla Roja	Gran Alternativa 2019 first round tag team match	05:25

==== October 18 Super Viernes ====
No.	Results	Stipulations	Times
1	Pequeño Nitro and Pierrothito defeated Angelito and Fantasy	Best two-out-of-three falls tag team match	14:13
2	Black Panther and Blue Panther Jr.) and Pegasso defeated Misterioso Jr., Okumura, and Sagrado	Six-man "Lucha Libre rules" tag team match	10:11
3	Rey Cometa defeated Stigma	Lighting match (Singles match, 10 minute time limit)	05:59
4	Nueva Generacion Dinamitas (El Cuatrero, Forastero, and Sansón) defeated Atlantis Jr., Audaz, and Soberano Jr.	Six-man "Lucha Libre rules" tag team match	22:27
5	Ángel de Oro, Carístico, and Diamante Azul defeated Los Guerreros Laguneros (Euforia, Gran Guerrero, and Último Guerrero)	Six-man "Lucha Libre rules" tag team match	10:42
6	Star Jr. and Valiente defeated Fugaz and Místico	2019 Gran Alternativa tournament final	17:42
