= Copa Nuevos Valores =

Mexican professional wrestling tournament

- Official poster for the tournament final
- Promotion: Consejo Mundial de Lucha Libre
- Date: April 3, 2018; April 10, 2018; April 17, 2018
- City: Mexico City, Mexico
- Venue: Arena México

Event chronology
← Previous; Homenaje a Dos Leyendas	Next →: 75. Aniversario de Arena Coliseo

The Copa Nuevos Valores (Spanish for "New Values Cup") was a professional wrestling tournament promoted by the Mexican lucha libre promotion Consejo Mundial de Lucha Libre (CMLL) held between April 3 and April 17, 2018, at Arena México. The tournament was held to give prominence to 16 younger, lower ranked wrestlers who worked for CMLL at the time. As a professional wrestling tournament it was won not by actual competition, but by a scripted ending to a match.

The final match saw Magia Blanca defeat Flyer to win the tournament and earn a match for the Mexican National Welterweight Championship held by Soberano Jr. at the time. The tournament also included Astral, El Coyote, Fugaz, Grako, Jorge Kebrada, Maquiavelo, Príncipe Daniel, Príncipe Diamante, Príncipe Odin Jr., Retro, Reyko, Sangre Imperial, Súper Astro Jr. and Yago.

== History ==
The Mexican professional wrestling company Consejo Mundial de Lucha Libre (Spanish for "World Wrestling Council"; CMLL for short) has a long history of promoting tournaments focusing on the younger or lower ranked wrestlers on their rosters, primarily as a means to showcase select wrestlers in an attempt to elevate one or more wrestlers up the ranks of CMLL. In 1994 CMLL introduced the Gran Alternativa ("The Great Alternative") tournament, a tag team tournament where a relative rookie would team up with a veteran wrestler for a tournament. The tournament concept was so successful that it became an annual event on CMLL's event calendar from that point forward.

In 1996 CMLL introduced La Copa Junior, a tournament for second or third-generation wrestlers, often lower ranked, again to showcase at least one of the competitors in the tournament. The La Copa Junior has been held intermittently since 1996 although not on an annual schedule. In 2014 CMLL held both a regular version of La Copa Junior, and a "VIP" version focusing more on well established second-generation wrestlers, distinguishing itself from the tournament that focuses on younger wrestlers. In 2011 CMLL held the Forjando un Ídolo ("Forging an Idol") tournament, featuring 16 low-to-mid card wrestlers competing in the tournament. The tournament was won by Ángel de Oro and signaled his ascent up the ranks of CMLL. In both 2012 and 2013 CMLL held the Torneo Sangre Nueva (literally "the New Blood Tournament"), featuring younger, lower ranked wrestlers in the traditional tournament format. In early 2018 CMLL decided to hold a new tournament focusing on their lower ranked or younger competitors called the Torneo Nuevos Valores ("New Values Cup") featuring 16 competitors who had yet to get many opportunities in CMLL, in a three-week long tournament. Audaz and Templario were originally announced for the tournament, but were replaced by Astral and Príncipe Odin Jr. later on without any explanation.

== Tournament ==
The tournament featured 15 professional wrestling matches spread out over three shows. The tournament format followed CMLL's traditional tournament formats, with two qualifying blocks of eight wrestlers that competed during the first and second week of the tournament and a final match between the two block winners. The qualifying blocks were all one-fall matches while the tournament final was a best two-out-of-three-falls match.

=== Tournament participants ===
Name	Age	CMLL debut	Block	Notes	Ref(s)
Astral	29	2009	A	Originally worked in the Mini-Estrella division until 2018	
El Coyote	Unknown	2013	B		
Flyer	23	2014	A	Grandson of Super Parka	
Fugaz	22	2017	B		
Grako	Unknown	2017	A		
George Kebrada	27	2017	A		
Magia Blanca	24	2015	B		
Maquiavelo	Unknown	2017	B		
Príncipe Daniel	22	2016	B		
Príncipe Diamante	21	2015	B		
Príncipe Odin Jr.	36	2005	B	Used the name "Artillero" from 2005-January 2018	
Reyko	Unknown	2014	B		
Retro	Unknown	2016	A		
Sangre Imperial	Unknown	2016	A	Son of Sangre Chicana	
Súper Astro Jr.	21	2018	A	Son of Súper Astro	
Yago	29	2016	A		

=== Tournament brackets ===
Round of 16
Astral
Súper Astro Jr.	W
Retro
Yago	W
Flyer	W
Grako
Sangre Imperial	W
George Kebrada
Reyko
Magia Blanca	W
Fugaz
El Coyote	W
Príncipe Diamante	W
Maquiavelo
Príncipe Daniel	W
Príncipe Odin Jr.

Quarterfinals
Súper Astro Jr.
Yago	W
Flyer	W
Sangre Imperial
Magia Blanca	W
El Coyote
Príncipe Diamante	W
Príncipe Daniel

Semifinals
Yago
Flyer	W
Magia Blanca	W
Príncipe Diamante

Finals
Flyer
Magia Blanca	W

=== Tournament shows ===
==== April 3, 2018 ====
No.	Results	Stipulations
1	Bengala and Oro Jr. defeated Apocalipsis and Inquisidor	Best two-out-of-three falls tag team match
2	Angelito, Stukita, and Último Dragóncito defeated Pequeño Olímpico, Pequeño Violencia, and Pierrothito	Best two-out-of-three falls six-man tag team match
3	La Amapola, Dalys la Caribeña, and Tiffany defeated Kaho Kobayashi, La Vaquerita, and Marcela	Best two-out-of-three falls six-man tag team match
4	George Kebrada and Sangre Imperial defeated Flyer, Grako, Retro, Yago, Astral, and Súper Astro Jr.	Copa Nuevos Valores seeding battle royal
5	Súper Astro Jr. defeated Astral	Copa Nuevos Valores first round match
6	Yago defeated Retro	Copa Nuevos Valores first round match
7	Flyer defeated Grako	Copa Nuevos Valores first round match
8	Sangre Imperial defeated George Kebrada	Copa Nuevos Valores first round match
9	Yago defeated Súper Astro Jr.	Copa Nuevos Valores quarterfinal match
10	Flyer defeated Sangre Imperial	Copa Nuevos Valores quarterfinal match
11	Flyer defeated Yago	Copa Nuevos Valores semifinal match
12	Mr. Niebla and Los Hijos del Infierno (Ephesto and Mephisto) defeated Diamante Azul, Dragon Lee, and Soberano Jr.	Best two-out-of-three falls six-man tag team match

==== April 10, 2018 ====
No.	Results	Stipulations
1	Magnus and Robin defeated Akuma and Metálico	Best two-out-of-three falls tag team match
2	Eléctrico, Fuego, and Pegasso defeated Disturbio, Hijo del Signo, and Nitro	Best two-out-of-three falls six-man tag team match
3	Principe Daniel and Príncipe Odín Jr. defeated El Coyote, Fugaz, Príncipe Diamante, Maquiavelo, Reyko, and Magia Blanca	Copa Nuevos Valores seeding battle royal
4	Magia Blanca defeated Reyko	Copa Nuevos Valores first round match
5	El Coyote defeated Fugaz	Copa Nuevos Valores first round match
6	Príncipe Diamante defeated Maquiavelo	Copa Nuevos Valores first round match
7	Principe Daniel defeated Príncipe Odín Jr.	Copa Nuevos Valores first round match
8	Magia Blanca defeated El Coyote	Copa Nuevos Valores quarterfinal match
9	Príncipe Diamante defeated Principe Daniel	Copa Nuevos Valores quarterfinal match
10	Magia Blanca defeated Príncipe Diamante	Copa Nuevos Valores semifinal match
11	Diamante Azul, Místico, and Niebla Roja defeated La Peste Negra (El Felino and Mr. Niebla) and Rey Bucanero	Best two-out-of-three falls six-man tag team match
12	Dragon Lee defeated Mephisto	Best two-out-of-three falls match

==== April 17, 2018 ====
No.	Results	Stipulations
1	Acero and Aéreo defeated Angelito and Pequeño Universo 2000	Best two-out-of-three falls tag team match
2	Metálico and Los Cancerberos del Infierno (Cancerbero and Raziel) defeated Eléctrico, Magnus, and Robin	Best two-out-of-three falls six-man tag team match
3	Audaz, Star Jr., and Súper Astro Jr. defeated Disturbio, Universo 2000 Jr., and Virus by disqualification	Best two-out-of-three falls six-man tag team match
4	Drone and OneAtos Style (Esfinge, and Tritón) defeated Kawato San, Okumura, and Sagrado	Best two-out-of-three falls six-man tag team match
5	Magia Blanca defeated Flyer	Best two-out-of-three falls match, Copa Nuevos Valores final match
6	Carístico, Dragon Lee, and Rush defeated Los Guerreros Laguneros (Euforia and Gran Guerrero) and Rey Bucanero	Best two-out-of-three falls six-man tag team match

== Aftermath ==
As a result of winning the tournament, Magia Blanca was awarded a championship match in his weight division. On May 1, 2018, Magia Blanca wrestled Soberano Jr. for the Mexican National Welterweight Championship but lost two falls to one. The two finalists, Magica Blanca and Flyer, faced off in CMLL's next tournament, the Gran Alternativa tournament, where Flyer gained a measure of revenge and he and Volador Jr. defeated Magia Blanca and Atlantis from the tournament. On May 24 it was revealed that Magia Blanca had suffered a knee injury during a match and would not be able to work for six to nine months.
