= CMLL Torneo Nacional de Parejas Increíbles (2018) =

2018 Consejo Mundial de Lucha Libre tournament

- Official poster for the tournament finals
- Promotion: Consejo Mundial de Lucha Libre
- Date: February 2, 2018; February 9, 2018; February 23, 2018
- City: Mexico City, Mexico
- Venue: Arena México

Event chronology
← Previous; Fantastica Mania	Next → Homenaje a Dos Leyendas

CMLL Torneo Nacional de Parejas Increíbles tournaments chronology
← Previous; 2017	Next → 2019

The CMLL Torneo Nacional de Parejas Increíbles 2018 or "National Incredible Pairs Tournament 2018" is a tag team Lucha Libre tournament held by the Mexican wrestling promotion Consejo Mundial de Lucha Libre (CMLL). The tournament is based on the Lucha Libre Parejas Increíbles match concept, which pairs two wrestlers of opposite allegiance, one portraying a villain, referred to as a "rudo" in Lucha Libre wrestling terminology, and one portraying a fan favorites, or "técnico". The 2018 version of the tournament was the ninth time in a row that CMLL held the tournament since the first tournament in 2010. The winners are presented with a trophy but not given any other tangible reward for the victory.

The finals were originally scheduled to take place on Friday, February 16, 2018, but due to an earthquake hitting Mexico City on that day the show was canceled while the building was inspected for structural damage. The finals took place on March 23 instead. The 16-team tournament was won by the team of Rush and El Terrible, who had been long-time rivals from 2011 to 2013, and had previously teamed up for the 2012, 2013 and 2017 tournaments. The duo defeated Volador Jr. and Último Guerrero in the finals of the three-week tournament. After the tournament El Terrible joined Rush's group called Los Ingobernables and together they won the CMLL World Tag Team Championship

== History ==
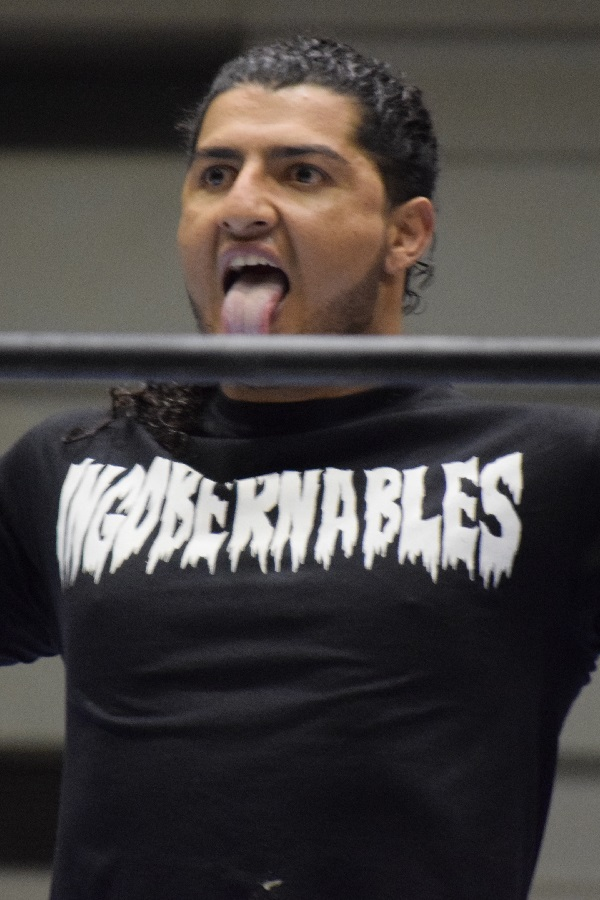
Rush, the tecnico winner of the 2018 tournament.

The Mexican professional wrestling promotion Consejo Mundial de Lucha Libre (CMLL; "World Wrestling Council") held their first Torneo Nacional de Parejas Increíbles ("National Incredible Pairs Tournament") in 2010, from January 22 through February 5, marking the beginning of an annual tournament. CMLL has previous held Parejas Increíbles tournaments on an irregular basis and often promoted individual Parejas Increíbles and Relevos Increíbles ("Incredible Relay", with teams of three or more wrestlers). The Parejas Increíbles concept is a long-standing tradition in lucha libre and is at times referred to as a "strange bedfellows" match in English speaking countries, because a Pareja Increible consists of a face (referred to as a técnico in Lucha Libre, or a "good guy") and a heel (a rudo, those that portray "the bad guys") teamed up for a specific match, or in this case for a tournament. The 2018 tournament was the ninth annual Parejas Increíbles tournament, and like its predecessors held as part of CMLL's regular Friday night CMLL Super Viernes ("Super Friday") shows.

== Tournament ==
The tournament featured 15 professional wrestling matches with different wrestlers teaming up, some of whom were involved in pre-existing scripted feuds or storylines while others were simply paired up for the tournament. For the Torneo Nacional de Parejas Increíbles tournaments, CMLL often teamed up a técnico (those that portray the "good guys" in wrestling, also known as faces) and a rudo (the "bad guy" or heels) who are involved in a pre-existing storyline feud at the time of the tournament so that the tournament itself can be used as a storytelling device to help tell the story of escalating confrontations between two feuding wrestlers. The tournament format followed CMLL's traditional tournament formats, with two qualifying blocks of eight teams that competed during the first and second week of the tournament and a final match between the two block winners. The qualifying blocks were all one-fall matches while the tournament final was a best two-out-of-three-falls tag team match.

=== Tournament participants ===
Block A

- Ángel de Oro (T) and El Cuatrero (R)
- Atlantis (T) and Mr. Niebla (R)
- Blue Panther Jr. (T) and Máscara Año 2000 (R)
- Carístico (T) and Euforia (R)
- Marco Corleone (T) and Shocker (R)
- Dragon Lee (T) and Sansón (R)
- Rush (T) and El Terrible (R)
- Stuka Jr. (T) and Forastero (R)

Block B

- Blue Panther (T) and Sam Adonis (R)
- Diamante Azul (T) and Comandante Pierroth (R)
- Místico (T) and Mephisto (R)
- Niebla Roja (T) and Gran Guerrero (R)
- Soberano Jr. (T) and Hechicero (R)
- Titán (T) and Bárbaro Cavernario (R)
- Valiente (T) and Rey Bucanero (R)
- Volador Jr. (T) and Último Guerrero (R)

=== Ongoing storylines ===
The team of Rush and El Terrible had teamed together in two previous Parejas Increíbles tournaments, both as part of a long, heated storyline feud between the two that ran from 2011 through 2012. The storyline saw El Terrible defeat Rush to win the vacant CMLL World Heavyweight Championship, The two were teamed up for the 2012 Torneo Nacional de Parejas Increíbles as CMLL continued to build the feud. The two were able to work together well enough to make it to the finals of the tournament but lost to Atlantis and Euforia in the finals when they were unable to get along. After the loss Rush made a Lucha de Apuestas challenge to El Terrible. The storyline culminated on September 14 in the main event of CMLL's 79th Anniversary Show, where El Terrible lost and as a result, shaved bald. In March, 2013 El Terrible and Rush teamed up for the 2013 Torneo de Parejas Increíbles and were teamed up again for the 2017 Torneo de Parejas Increíbles unsuccessfully as they were eliminated Atlantis and Euforia in the second round.

=== Tournament brackets ===
Round of 16
Atlantis and Mr. Niebla	W
Ángel de Oro and El Cuatrero	07:03
El Terrible and Rush	W
Forastero and Stuka Jr.	07:50
Carístico and Euforia	W
Dragon Lee and Sansón	05:55
Marco Corleone and Shocker	W
Blue Panther Jr. and Máscara Año 2000	03:34
Gran Guerrero and Niebla Roja	W
Blue Panther & Sam Adonis	05:17
Mephisto and Místico	W
El Soberano Jr. & Hechicero	06:01
Último Guerrero and Volador Jr.	W
Bárbaro Cavernario and Titán	04:36
Diamante Azul and Pierroth	W
Rey Bucanero and Valiente	02:45

Quarterfinals
Atlantis and Mr. Niebla	07:41
El Terrible and Rush	W
Carístico and Euforia	W
Marco Corleone and Shocker	02:45
Gran Guerrero and Niebla Roja	05:57
Mephisto and Místico	W
Diamante Azul and Pierroth	04:33
Último Guerrero and Volador Jr.	W

Semifinals
El Terrible and Rush	W
Carístico and Euforia	02:00
Mephisto and Místico	07:41
Último Guerrero and Volador Jr.	W

Finals
El Terrible and Rush	W
Volador Jr. and Último Guerrero	19:41

=== Tournament shows ===
==== February 2, 2018 ====
No.	Results	Stipulations	Times
1	El Coyote and Templario defeated Astral and Eléctrico	Best two-out-of-three falls tag team match	11:37
2	Audaz, Pegasso, and Rey Cometa defeated Kawato San, Misterioso Jr., and Virus by disqualification	Best two-out-of-three falls six-man tag team match	14:19
3	Diamante Azul and Valiente defeated Niebla Roja, Blue Panther, Soberano Jr., Místico, Volador Jr., and Titán	Torneo Nacional de Parejas Increíbles seeding battle royal	02:08
4	Gran Guerrero and Niebla Roja defeated Blue Panther and Sam Adonis	Torneo Nacional de Parejas Increíbles first round match	05:17
5	Mephisto and Místico defeated Hechicero and Soberano Jr.	Torneo Nacional de Parejas Increíbles first round match	06:01
6	Último Guerrero and Volador Jr. defeated Bárbaro Cavernario and Titán	Torneo Nacional de Parejas Increíbles first round match	04:36
7	Diamante Azul and Pierroth defeated Rey Bucanero and Valiente	Torneo Nacional de Parejas Increíbles first round match	02:45
8	Mephisto and Místico defeated Gran Guerrero and Niebla Roja	Torneo Nacional de Parejas Increíbles quarterfinal match	05:57
9	Último Guerrero and Volador Jr. defeated Diamante Azul and Pierroth	Torneo Nacional de Parejas Increíbles quarterfinal match	04:33
10	Último Guerrero and Volador Jr. defeated Mephisto and Místico	Torneo Nacional de Parejas Increíbles semifinal match	07:41
11	Ángel de Oro, Atlantis, and Carístico defeated Euforia, El Cuatrero, and Sansón by disqualification	Best two-out-of-three falls six-man tag team match	09:30

==== February 9, 2018 ====
No.	Results	Stipulations	Times
1	El Hijo del Signo and Yago defeated Magia Blanca and Magnus	Best two-out-of-three falls tag team match	12:14
2	La Amapola, Dalys la Caribeña, and Zeuxis defeated Kaho Kobayashi, Marcela, and Princesa Sugehit	Best two-out-of-three falls six-man tag team match	13:22
3	Máscara Año 2000 and Shocker defeated Mr. Niebla, El Terrible, Euforia, El Cuatrero, Sansón, and Forastero	Torneo Nacional de Parejas Increíbles seeding battle royal	04:26
4	Atlantis and Mr. Niebla defeated Ángel de Oro and El Cuatrero	Torneo Nacional de Parejas Increíbles first round match	07:03
5	Rush and El Terrible defeated Forastero and Stuka Jr.	Torneo Nacional de Parejas Increíbles first round match	07:50
6	Carístico and Euforia defeated Dragon Lee and Sansón	Torneo Nacional de Parejas Increíbles first round match	05:55
7	Marco Corleone and Shocker defeated Blue Panther Jr. and Máscara Año 2000	Torneo Nacional de Parejas Increíbles first round match	03:34
8	Rush and El Terrible defeated Atlantis and Mr. Niebla	Torneo Nacional de Parejas Increíbles quarterfinal match	07:41
9	Carístico and Euforia defeated Marco Corleone and Shocker	Torneo Nacional de Parejas Increíbles quarterfinal match	02:45
10	Rush and El Terrible defeated Carístico and Euforia	Torneo Nacional de Parejas Increíbles semifinal match	02:00
11	Diamante Azul, Místico, and Volador Jr. defeated Bárbaro Cavernario, Kráneo, and Último Guerrero	Best two-out-of-three falls six-man tag team match	06:48

==== February 23, 2018 ====
No.	Results	Stipulations	Times
1	Mercurio and Pierrothito defeated Stukita and Último Dragoncito	Best two-out-of-three falls tag team match	11:13
2	La Dinastia Casas (Puma and Tiger) and Kawato-San defeated Fuego, Stigma and Tritón	Best two-out-of-three falls six-man tag team match	13:53
3	Soberano Jr. vs. Niebla Roja ended in a time limit draw	Lighting Match (One fall, 10 minute time-limit match)	10:00
4	Diamante Azul, Marco Corleone and Stuka Jr. defeated Los Guerreros Laguneros (Euforia and Gran Guerrero) and Kraneo	Best two-out-of-three falls six-man tag team match	11:17
5	Ángel de Oro, Atlantis and Dragon Lee defeated Nueva Generación Dinamita (El Cuatrero, Forastero and Sansón)	Best two-out-of-three falls six-man tag team match	07:46
6	Rush and El Terrible defeated Volador Jr. and Último Guerrero	Torneo Nacional de Parejas Increíbles tournament finals	19:41

== Aftermath ==
After the victory both Rush invited El Terrible to join Los Ingobernables, an offer El Terrible immediately accepted, joining forces with Rush and El Bestia del Ring. On July 13, Rush and El Terrible defeated Volador Jr. and Valiente to win the CMLL World Tag Team Championship as part of an ongoing storyline between Los Ingobernables and Volador Jr. and his family.
