= Torneo Gran Alternativa (2018) =

Mexican professional wrestling tournament

- Official poster for the tournament final CMLL Super Viernes show
- Promotion: Consejo Mundial de Lucha Libre
- Date: May 4, 2018; May 11, 2018; May 18, 2018
- City: Mexico City, Mexico
- Venue: Arena México

Event chronology
← Previous; 62. Aniversario de Arena México	Next → Atlantis 35th Anniversary Show

Torneo Gran Alternativa chronology
← Previous; 2017	Next → 2019

The Torneo Gran Alternativa 2018 was a professional wrestling tournament event produced by the Mexican wrestling promotion Consejo Mundial de Lucha Libre (CMLLl; Spanish "World Wrestling Council") that began on May 4, 2018 and ran over the course of three of CMLL's Friday night shows in Arena México through May 18. The Torneo Gran Alternativa (Great alternative tournament) concept sees a Novato or rookie team up with an experienced wrestler for a tag team tournament. The rookie winner is often elevated up the ranks of CMLL as a result of winning the tournament, but there is no specific "prize" for winning the tournament beyond a symbolic trophy.

The 2018 tournament was the 23rd Gran Alternativa tournament that CMLL has held since its inception in 1994 and was won by Flyer and his uncle Volador Jr. as they defeated Último Guerrero and Templario in the finals. The tournament victory helped elevate Flyer in the ranks as he began working higher on CMLL shows after the tournament victory. The finals of the 2018 tournament also served as the catalyst for the return of L.A. Park and his son El Hijo de L.A. Park's return to CMLL.

== History ==
Starting in 1994 the Mexican professional wrestling promotion Consejo Mundial de Lucha Libre (CMLL) created a special tournament concept where they would team up a novato, or rookie, with a veteran for a single-elimination tag team tournament. The tournament was called El Torneo Gran Alternativa, or "The Great Alternative Tournament" and became a recurring event on the CMLL calendar. CMLL did not hold a Gran Alternativa tournament in 1997 and 2000 held on each year from 2001 through 2014, opting not to hold a tournament in 2015. The 2016 Gran Alternativa tournament will be the 21st overall Gran Alternativa tournament. All tournaments have been held in Arena México, CMLL's main venue and has taken place on Friday nights, with the 2016 tournament being the only time the Gran Alternativa was held on Tuesday nights. The 2018 Gran Alternativa tournament was the 23rd tournament held by CMLL in the 24 years since the first installment.

== Tournament background ==
The tournament featured 15 professional wrestling matches with different wrestlers teaming up, some of which were involved in pre-existing scripted feuds or storylines while others are simply paired up for the tournament. Wrestlers portrayed either villains (referred to as Rudos in Mexico) or fan favorites (Técnicos in Mexico) as they competed in wrestling matches with pre-determined outcomes. The tournament format followed CMLL's traditional tournament formats, with two qualifying blocks of eight teams that competed in the first and second week of the tournament and a final match between the two block winners. The qualifying blocks were one-fall matches while the tournament finals was a best two-out-of-three-falls tag team match. Each qualifying block started with all 8 Novatos competing in a "seeding" battle royal to determine the brackets for the block.

Gran Alternativa participants

Block	Rookie	Veteran	Ref(s)
Block A	Eléctrico	Místico	
Block A	Espanto Jr.	Hechicero	
Block A	Flyer	Volador Jr.	
Block A	Magica Blanca	Atlantis	
Block A	Maquiavelo	Ephesto	
Block A	Robin	Ángel de Oro	
Block A	Yago	Mephisto	
Block A	El Hijo del Signo	El Terrible	
Block B	Akuma	Euforia	
Block B	Astral	Niebla Roja	
Block B	Audaz	Kraneo	
Block B	Star Jr.	Carístico	
Block B	El Coyote	Bárbaro Cavernario	
Block B	Principe Diamante	Valiente	
Block B	Templario	Último Guerrero	
Block B	Universo 2000 Jr.	Máscara Año 2000	

The 2018 tournament marked the first time that Audaz, El Coyote, Magia Blanca, Maquiavelo, Principe Diamante, Templario and Universo 2000 Jr. competed in a Gran Alternativa tournament. While this was also Eléctrico's first Gran Alternativa, he had worked for CMLL since 2006 in the Mini-Estrellas division and only been moved up to the main division in early 2018. Of the remaining novatos El Hijo del Signo was the oldest (age 33 or 34) of the rookies and also the novato with the longest CMLL tenure, having competed in both the 2011 and 2012 tournaments. Audaz, at age 20, was the youngest novato in the 2018 tournament. Espanto Jr. had competed in three previous Gran Alternativa tournaments in 2013, 2014 and 2017. Magia Blanco came into the Gran Alternativa with the most momentum of all the rookies by having won the Copa Nueva Valores ("New Values Cup") rookie tournament by beating Flyer in the finals on April 17, followed by a very well received Mexican National Welterweight Championship match against El Soberano on May 1 which he lost.

On the veterans side, all competitors had taken part in the Gran Alternativa tournament before, although Bárbaro Cavernario made his first appearance as a veteran after having won the 2014 tournament as a rookie, teaming with Mr. Niebla. Of all the veterans Carístico and Último Guerrero have had the most success in the Gran Alternativa, with both having won the tournament as a rookie and then twice more as a veteran, with Carístico winning the previous year's tournament with Soberano. (Note: Between 2004 and 2011 Carístico competed under the name "Místico", a name that was later given to a new Místico.) Último Guerrero and Atlantis had both competed in 14 Gran Alternativa tournaments prior to the 2018 version, and at 55 years of age Atlantis was the oldest competitor in the tournament. Other previous winners included Volador Jr. (2016) and El Terrible (2012). Ephesto competed in the 2006 tournament under the name "Hombre Sin Nombre" but 2018 marked the first time he competed as "Ephesto" after having played the character since 2007.

== Tournament results ==
The 2018 tournament was split out over three Super Viernes shows, with a qualifying block on May 4 and May 11. Block A started with the eight novatos competing in a Battle royal to determine the first round tag team match ups. CMLL often employs a "Seeding battle royal" for their tag team tournaments, where the first two wrestlers eliminated would be in the first tournament match, the third and fourth man eliminated would meet in the second tournament match, the fifth and sixth man matchup in the third first-round match and the last two wrestlers would meet in the fourth and final first-round match. Flyer and El Hijo del Signo were the last two men in the match, earning the longst rest between matches. The first tag team match of the tournament was also the longest tournament match of the night, as Eléctrico and Místico defeated Espanto Jr. and Hechicero in nine minutes, six seconds. Yago and Mephisto, Magia Blanca and Atlantis and the team of Flyer and Volador Jr. all moved to the second round. In the second round Yago and Mephisto defeated Eléctrico and Místico in 6:52 while Flyer got a small measure of revenge against Copa Nueva Valores winner Magica Blanca, as Flyer and Volador Jr. defeated Magica Blanca and Atlantis. In the final block A match Flyer and Volador Jr. defeated Yago and Mephisto to qualify for the finals.

Block B of the Gran Alternativa took place a week later, and saw Templario and Universo 2000 Jr. outlast Star Jr., Audaz, El Coyote, Astral, Akuma and Príncipe Diamante in the seeding battle royal to set the match order for the night. The novato/veteran teams of Akuma and Euforia, Carístico and Star Jr., Audaz and Kráneo, and Templario and Último Guerrero all advanced to the quarterfinal round of the tournament. 2017 Gran Alternativa winner Carístico and novato Star Jr. advanced to the semi-finals with a victory over Akuma and Euforia. In the other quarterfinal Último Guerrero, who like Carístico had already won three Gran Alternativa tournaments and his trainee Templario defeated Templarios long time rival Audaz and veteran Kráneo to move on. In the second tournament final Templario and Último Guerrero defeated Star Jr. and Carístico when Templario pinned Carístico.

The final Gran Alternativa tournament match was held on May 18 and was the only best two-out-of-three falls match of the tournament. The two teams split the first two falls between them, leading to the third and final fall where both team members had to be pinned to end the match. In the final moments of the match novato Flyer pinned veteran Último Guerrero after executing a Moonsault side slam off the rope, followed by Volador Jr. pinning Templario after rolling him up with a rana. After the match was over Flyer and Volador Jr. were attacked by Los Ingobernables, Rush, El Terrible and La Bestia del Ring to continue an ongoing rivalry between Rush and Volador Jr. moments later Volador Jr,'s uncle L.A. Park and cousin El Hijo de L.A. Park made their surprise return to CMLL by running to the ring and chasing off Los Ingobernables. After Flyer and Volador Jr. were given their Gran Alternativa tournament L.A. Park made a challenge to Rush for a Lucha de Apuestas match.

=== Tournament brackets ===
Round of 16
Eléctrico and Místico	W
Espanto Jr. and Hechicero	09:06
Yago and Mephisto	W
Robin and Ángel de Oro	04:21
Magia Blanca and Atlantis	W
Maquiavelo and Ephesto	06:16
Flyer and Volador Jr.	W
El Hijo del Signo and El Terrible	05:20
Akuma and Euforia	W
Astral and Niebla Roja
Star Jr. and Carístico	W
El Coyote and Bárbaro Cavernario
Audaz and Kraneo	W
Príncipe Diamante and Valiente
Templario and Último Guerrero	W
Máscara Año 2000 and Universo 2000 Jr.

Quarterfinals
Eléctrico and Místico	06:52
Yago and Mephisto	W
Magia Blanca and Atlantis	02:51
Flyer and Volador Jr.	W
Akuma and Euforia
Star Jr. and Carístico	W
Audaz and Kraneo
Templario and Último Guerrero	W

Semifinals
Yago and Mephisto	07:49
Flyer and Volador Jr.	W
Star Jr. and Carístico
Templario and Último Guerrero	W

Finals
Flyer and Volador Jr.	W
Templario and Último Guerrero

== Aftermath ==
The tournament victory helped establish Flyer as a wrestler on the rise in CMLL, but it was the aftermath of the tournament that had the biggest impact both on Flyer's career and CMLL's direction in 2018. The appearance of L.A. Park and El Hijo de L.A. Park marked a period where CMLL began to work with more "independent" wrestlers, allowing wrestlers not under permanent contract to work on CMLL shows. The biggest change was that CMLL would allow independent wrestlers to also work for their rival Lucha Libre AAA Worldwide (AAA), which had not been allowed every before in the history of the company. In addition to L.A. Park and El Hijo de L.A. Park, this change in approach allowed Penta El 0M, Fénix, Cibernético (Billed as "Ciber Main Man"), El Zorro ("The Crizh") and Charly Manson ("Scharlie Rockstar") to all work for CMLL and become parts of major storylines over the summer of 2018.

The appearance of L.A. Park led to a protracted storyline feud between La Familia Real ("The Royal Family"; L.A. Park, Volador Jr., Flyer and El Hijo de L.A. Park) against Los Ingobernables (Rush, El Terrible and El Bestia del Ring) that played out over the summer of 2018. The main focus was building a rivalry between Rush and L.A. Park, believed to be leading to a Lucha de Apuestas, or bet match, at the CMLL 85th Anniversary Show. The storyline build saw Rush and El Terrible defeat Volador Jr. and Valiente to win the CMLL World Tag Team Championship on July 13, 2018.

== Tournament shows ==
May 4, 2018 Super Viernes

No.	Results	Stipulations	Times
1	Mercurio, Pequeño Violencia and Pierrothito defeated Fantasy, Shockercito and Último Dragoncito	Best two-out-of-three falls tag team match	14:27
2	Lluvia, Marcela and Princesa Sugehith defeated La Amapola, La Seductora and Tiffany	Six-man "Lucha Libre rules" tag team match	14:39
3	Blue Panther, Kraneo and Valiente defeated La Sangre Dinamita (El Cuatrero, Sansón and Forastero)	Six-man "Lucha Libre rules" tag team match	12:15
4	Rush defeated Último Guerrero	Lighting Match (One fall, 10 minute time-limit match)	08:39
5	El Hijo del Signo and Flyer defeated Eléctrico, Espanto Jr., Magia Blanca, Maquiavelo, Robin and Yago	Gran Alternativa 2018 seeding battle royal	02:27
6	Eléctrico and Místico defeated Espanto Jr. and Hechicero by disqualification	Gran Alternativa 2018 first round tag team match	09:06
7	Yago and Mephisto defeated Ángel de Oro and Robin	Gran Alternativa 2018 first round tag team match	04:21
8	Atlantos and Magia Blanca defeated Ephesto and& Maquiavelo	Gran Alternativa 2018 first round tag team match	06:16
9	Flyer and Volador Jr. defeated Hijo del Signo and El Terrible	Gran Alternativa 2018 first round tag team match	05:20
10	Yago and Mephisto defeated Eléctrico and Místico	Gran Alternativa 2018 Quarter final tag team match	06:52
11	Flyer and Volador Jr. defeated Atlantis and Magia Blanca	Gran Alternativa 2018 Quarter final tag team match	02:51
12	Flyer and Volador Jr. defeated Yago and Mephisto	Gran Alternativa 2018 Semi-final tag team match	07:49

May 11, 2018 Super Viernes

No.	Results	Stipulations
1	Mercurio and Pequeño Violencia defeated Acero and Aéreo	Six-man "Lucha Libre rules" tag team match
2	Fuego, Pegasso and Stigma defeated Los Cancerberos del Infierno (Cancerbero and Raziel) and Disturbio	Six-woman "Lucha Libre rules" tag team match
3	Los Revolucionarios del la Muerte (Dragón Rojo Jr. and Pólvora) and Hechicero defeated One Atos Style (Esfinge, Titán and Tritón)	Six-man "Lucha Libre rules" tag team match
4	Negro Casas defeated Soberano Jr.	Six-man "Lucha Libre rules" tag team match
5	Templario and Universo 2000 Jr. defeated Star Jr., Audaz, El Coyote, Astral, Akuma and Príncipe Diamante	Gran Alternativa 2018 seeding battle royal
6	Akuma and Euforia defeated Astral and Niebla Roja	Gran Alternativa 2018 first round tag team match
7	Carístico and Star Jr. defeated Bárbaro Cavernario and El Coyote	Gran Alternativa 2018 first round tag team match
8	Audaz and Kráneo defeated Príncipe Diamante and Valiente	Gran Alternativa 2018 first round tag team match
9	Templario and Último Guerrero defeated Máscara Año 2000 and Universo 2000 Jr.	Gran Alternativa 2018 first round tag team match
10	Carístico and Star Jr. defeated Akuma and Euforia	Gran Alternativa 201Quarterfinalal tag team match
11	Templario and Último Guerrero defeated Audaz and Kráneo	Gran Alternativa 2018 Quarterfinal tag team match
12	Templario and Último Guerrero defeated Carístico and Star Jr.	Gran Alternativa 2018 Semi-final tag team match
13	Ángel de Oro, Místico and Volador Jr. defeated Los Hijos del Infierno (Ephesto, Luciferno and Mephisto)	Six-man "Lucha Libre rules" tag team match

May 18, 2018 Super Viernes

No.	Results	Stipulations
1	Astral and Eléctrico defeated Espanto Jr. and El Hijo del Signo	Best two-out-of-three falls tag team match
2	Okumura, Puma and Tiger defeated Blue Panther Jr., Drone and The Panther	Six-man "Lucha Libre rules" tag team match
3	Guerrero Maya Jr. defeated Fuego	Lighting Match (One fall, 10 minute time-limit match)
4	La Sangre Dinamita (El Cuatrero, Forastero and Sansón) defeated Ángel de Oro, Místico and Soberano Jr.	Six-man "Lucha Libre rules" tag team match
5	Los Ingobernables (La Bestia del Ring, Rush and El Terrible) defeated Atlantis, Diamante Azul and Kráneo	Six-man "Lucha Libre rules" tag team match
6	Flyer and Volador Jr. defeated Templario and Último Guerrero	Gran Alternativa 2018 final, tag team match
