= La Hora Cero =

Mexican professional wrestling event

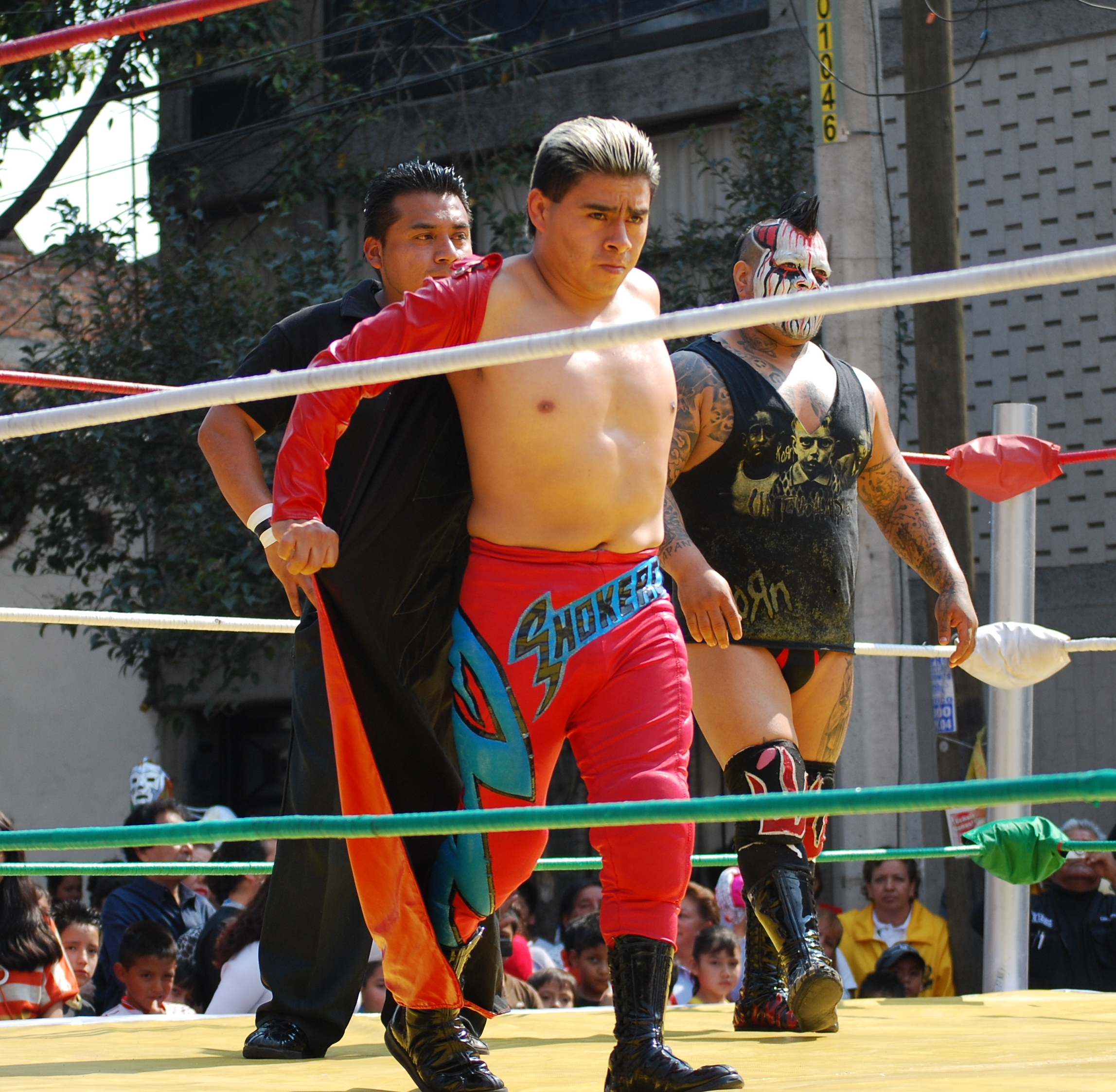
- Shockercito, after he was unmasked.
- Promotion: Consejo Mundial de Lucha Libre
- Date: January 11, 2009
- City: Mexico City, Mexico
- Venue: Arena Mexico

Pay-per-view chronology
← Previous; Pequeños Reyes del Aire	Next → Torneo Tanque Dantes

La Hora Cero (Spanish for "Zero Hour") was a professional wrestling major show event produced by Consejo Mundial de Lucha Libre (CMLL), which took place on January 11, 2009 in Arena Mexico, Mexico City, Mexico. Six matches took place at La Hora Cero, with the main event being a multi-man Steel Cage where the last man in the cage would lose his mask. 13 Mini-Estrella (the Spanish term for dwarf wrestlers) took part in the match; the match ended with Shockercito and Pierrothito being the last two men in the cage; Pierrothito subsequently pinned Shockercito to win the match. Following the match Shockercito was unmasked per Lucha Libre traditions. The show also featured four under card matches.

== Background ==
The event featured six professional wrestling matches with different wrestlers involved in pre-existing scripted feuds or storylines. Wrestlers portray either villains (referred to as Rudos in Mexico) or fan favorites (Técnicos in Mexico) as they compete in wrestling matches with pre-determined outcomes.

== Results ==
No.	Results	Stipulations
1	Pegasso and Rey Cometa defeated Los Romanos (Caligula and Messala) by Count Out	Tag team match.
2	Los Infernales (Euforia and Nosferatu) defeated Flash and Stuka Jr.	Tag team match.
3	Blue Panther, Marco Corleone and Shocker defeated Los Hijos del Averno (El Terrible, El Texano Jr. and Ephesto) (two falls to one)	Six-man "Lucha Libre rules" tag team match
4	Black Warrior, Mr. Niebla and Rey Bucanero defeated Místico, La Sombra and Volador Jr. (two falls to one)	Six-man "Lucha Libre rules" tag team match
5	Pierrothito defeated Shockercito; Also in the match: Cosmico, Eléctrico, Nino de Acero, Fantasy, Mascarita Dorada, Pequeño Ninja, Pequeno Olimpico, Pequeño Black Warrior, Tzuki, Ultimo Dragoncito and Universito 2000	13-man Steel Cage "elimination" match.

Cage match order of escape

#	Name
1	Cosmico
2	Electrico
3	Fantasy
4	Pequeño Ninja
5	El Nino de Acero
6	Tzuki
7	Pequeño Olimpico
8	Universito 2000
9	Pequeño Black Warrior
10	Ultimo Dragoncito
11	Mascarita Dorada
