= Juicio Final (2019) =

2019 Consejo Mundial de Lucha Libre event

- Official poster listing all seven matches
- Promotion: Consejo Mundial de Lucha Libre
- Date: May 31, 2019
- City: Mexico City, Mexico
- Venue: Arena México

Event chronology
| ← Previous; 63. Aniversario de Arena México | Next → Copa Dinastías |

Juicio Final chronology
| ← Previous; 2014 | Next → — |

Juicio Final (2019) (Spanish for "Final Judgement" 2019) was a professional wrestling supercard produced by Consejo Mundial de Lucha Libre (CMLL), which took place on May 31, 2019, at Arena México in Mexico City, Mexico. The 2019 Juicio Final event was the fifteenth event promoted under the Juicio Final chronology.

The main event, a Lucha de Apuesta ("Bet match"), saw Último Guerrero defeat Máscara Año 2000, forcing him to have all his hair shaved off as a result of his loss. The seven-match show also featured an additional Lucha de Apuesta where Mexican female wrestler La Amapola defeated Japanese women's wrestling star Kaho Kobayashi. Also on the show, Los Guerreros Laguneros (Euforia and Gran Guerrero) defeated Diamante Azul and Valiente to win the CMLL World Tag Team Championship and Virus defeated Metálico in a Lucha de Apuesta where the loser was forced to retire from wrestling.

== Production ==
=== Background ===
For decades Arena México, the main venue of the Mexican professional wrestling promotion Consejo Mundial de Lucha Libre (CMLL), would close down in early December and remain closed into either January or February to allow for renovations as well as letting Circo Atayde occupy the space over the holidays. As a result, CMLL usually held a "end of the year" supercard show on the first or second Friday of December in lieu of their normal Super Viernes show. 1955 was the first year where CMLL used the name "El Juicio Final" ("The Final Judgement") for their year-end supershow. Until 2000 the Jucio Final name was always used for the year end show, but since 2000 has at times been used for shows outside of December. It is not an annually recurring show, but instead held intermittently sometimes several years apart and not always in the same month of the year either. All Juicio Final shows have been held in Arena México in Mexico City, Mexico which is CMLL's main venue, its "home".

=== Storylines ===
The Juicio Final event featured seven professional wrestling matches with different wrestlers involved in pre-existing scripted feuds and storylines. Wrestlers portrayed heels (referred to as rudos in Mexican lucha libre, those that portray the "bad guys") or faces (técnicos in Mexican lucha libre, the "good guy" characters) as they participated in a series of tension-building events, which culminated in a wrestling match or series of matches.

== Results ==
| No. | Results | Stipulations | Times |
|---|---|---|---|
| 1 | Black Panther, Blue Panther Jr., and Rey Cometa defeated Kawato-San, Misterioso Jr., and Disturbio by disqualification | Best two-out-of-three falls six-man tag team match | 09:25 |
| 2 | Ángel de Oro, Niebla Roja, and Soberano Jr. defeated Los Hijos del Infierno (Ephesto, Luciferno, and Mephisto) | Best two-out-of-three falls six-man tag team match | 12:19 |
| 3 | Virus defeated Metálico | Lucha de Apuestas, career vs. career match | 20:15 |
| 4 | La Amapola defeated Kaho Kobayashi | Best two-out-of-three-falls Lucha de Apuestas, hair vs. hair match | 09:58 |
| 5 | Los Guerreros Laguneros (Euforia and Gran Guerrero) defeated Diamante Azul and Valiente (c) | Best two-out-of-three falls tag team match for the CMLL World Tag Team Championship | 13:24 |
| 6 | Carístico, Místico, and Volador Jr. defeated La Peste Negra (Bárbaro Cavernario, Mr. Niebla, and Negro Casas) | Best two-out-of-three falls six-man tag team match | 07:06 |
| 7 | Último Guerrero (with Gran Guerrero) defeated Máscara Año 2000 (with Disturbo) | Best two-out-of-three falls Lucha de Apuestas, hair vs. hair match | 10:05 |
(c) / – the champion(s) heading into the match
