= Último Guerrero =

Mexican professional wrestler (born 1972)

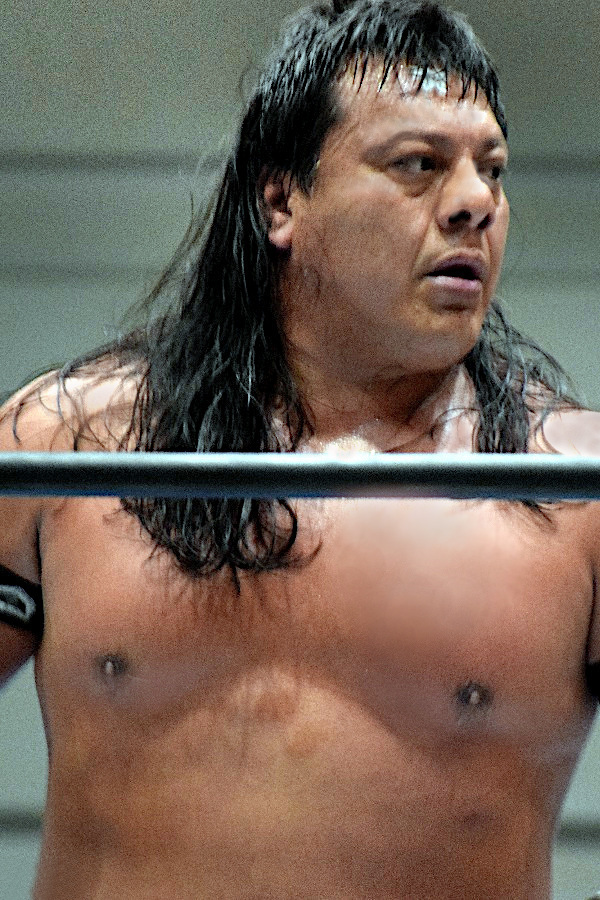
- Guerrero in 2017

Personal information
- Born: José Gutiérrez Hernández; March 1, 1972 (age 54) Gómez Palacio, Durango, Mexico

Professional wrestling career
- Ring name(s): Cóndor Dorado; El Flanagan; Último Guerrero
- Billed height: 1.77 m (5 ft 10 in)
- Billed weight: 93 kg (205 lb)
- Billed from: Gómez Palacio, Durango, Mexico
- Trained by: Toñito El Detector/Tinito; Halcón Suriano Gran Markus; Asterión
- Debut: June 14, 1990

José Gutiérrez Hernández (born March 1, 1972), better known by his ring name Último Guerrero (Spanish for "Last Warrior"), is a Mexican professional wrestler. He is signed to Consejo Mundial de Lucha Libre (CMLL), where he is the leader of the Los Guerreros Laguneros stable and part of the CMLL booking committee. He also makes appearances for partner promotion New Japan Pro-Wrestling (NJPW).

Guerrero debuted in 1990 and joined CMLL in 1997, where he has held several titles, including the CMLL World Heavyweight Championship twice, the CMLL World Light Heavyweight Championship and NWA World Historic Middleweight Championship once, the CMLL World Trios Championship five times, and the CMLL World Tag Team Championship six times. He is a two-time CMLL Universal Championship tournament winner and three-time Torneo Gran Alternativa winner, also winning the CMLL International Gran Prix twice and the Leyenda de Azul once. He has also wrestled for Total Nonstop Action Wrestling (TNA) in the United States, where he won the 2008 World X Cup as part of Team Mexico, as well as Ring of Honor (ROH), All Elite Wrestling (AEW) and Major League Wrestling (MLW), where he won the MLW National Openweight Championship.

Hernández is the older brother of Gran Guerrero, who was initially billed as his storyline son. He is not related to the professional wrestling legend Gory Guerrero or any of his children; "Guerrero" in this case is the Spanish word for warrior and not the surname of the character. He wrestled under a mask for the majority of his career until losing it in a Lucha de Apuestas ("bet match") to Atlantis in September 2014, being forced to unmask and reveal his birth name.

== Professional wrestling career ==
=== Early career (1990–1997) ===
Gutiérrez's father started bringing him to professional wrestling shows at the Torreón Bullring before he was a year old; his mother nurtured the interest by buying him wrestling toys, masks and small rings. At the age of 15, he began practicing amateur wrestling at the "Gimnasio El Ranchero" arena in Sacramento, Gómez Palacio, and was such a regular attendee that he was asked to fill in for an absentee opening match wrestler during a scheduled show. He wrestled that night without wrestling boots as "Cóndor Dorado" ("Golden Condor"), impressing trainer Toñito El Detector enough to be accepted as a student into his professional wrestling class. Despite only having one semester left, he dropped out of high school to focus fully on his wrestling pursuits, which brought him under the tutalege of Torreón fixtures Gran Markus, Asterión and Halcón Suriano at the Palacio de los Deportes.

Shortly after his debut, he adopted the gimmick of "Flanagan", based on Héctor Suárez's titular character, to match his friend and training partner Super Punk. After working as a tag team in Durango-based local promotions for several years, they received their first break in Promo Azteca on the invitation of Super Punk's older brother Panterita del Ring; Fuerza Guerrera and Blue Panther offered the two lodging under a ring at a gym in Iztapalapa for two years. At the behest of Promo Azteca's co-owner, Ricardo Reyes, the duo changed their names in 1996, with Gutiérrez adopting the name "Último Guerrero" ("Last Warrior") and Super Punk becoming "Último Rebelde"; they started using a British hooligan-inspired gimmick with visual cues from The Road Warriors. In late 1997, the team was scheduled to lose their masks in a Lucha de Apuestas ("bet match"), however, Guerrero saved them by joining Consejo Mundial de Lucha Libre (CMLL).

=== Consejo Mundial de Lucha Libre (1997–present) ===
==== Early years (1997–1999) ====
Upon his CMLL debut, Último Guerrero experienced moderate success working lower card matches, usually the first-to-third match on the show. At the CMLL 65th Anniversary Show on September 11, 1998, Guerrero defeated Mr. Águila in his first Lucha de Apuestas at CMLL's main arena, Arena México, forcing his opponent to unmask and reveal his real name. In 1999, he and Blue Panther won the Torneo Gran Alternativa ("Great Alternative Tournament"), in which a young wrestler teams with a veteran. On May 21, Guerrero unsuccessfully challenged The Great Sasuke for the NWA World Middleweight Championship.

==== Los Infernales (1999–2001) ====
In 1999, Guerrero and Rey Bucanero joined El Satánico's reformed Los Infernales stable. In the summer of 2000, he and Bucanero last defeated Mr. Niebla and Villano IV in a sixteen-team tournament to win the vacant CMLL World Tag Team Championship. During Satánico's storyline feud against Tarzan Boy, Guerrero and Bucanero turned on Satánico; each wrestler claimed that they deserved the name Los Infernales and Satánico was holding them back. In response, during a televised segment, Satánico recruited two other wrestlers to even the numbers, which was presented as if he used his "Satanic powers" to turn wrestler Rencor Latino into Averno ("Hell") and Astro Rey Jr. into Mephisto. When Tarzan Boy was injured and unable to wrestle, Guerrero and Bucanero recruited Máscara Mágica to even the numbers. The storyline between the two factions culminated when all seven wrestlers fought in a steel cage match at the CMLL 68th Anniversary Show on September 28, 2001, where the winning side would gain the rights to the Los Infernales name. In the end, Satánico pinned Mágica to gain the rights and his mask.

==== Los Guerreros del Infierno (2001–2005) ====
Guerrero, Bucanero and Tarzan Boy subsequently became known collectively as Los Guerreros del Infierno ("The Infernal Soldiers"). After a match with an inconclusive finish in October, Guerrero and Bucanero lost the CMLL World Tag Team Championship to El Hijo del Santo and Negro Casas on November 2, but regained it on May 31, 2002. Los Guerreros del Infierno then began feuding with Shocker and Vampiro Canadiense, whom they successfully defended the title against at the CMLL 69th Anniversary Show on September 13. On December 13, at Sin Piedad ("No Mercy"), Guerrero defeated Shocker to win the CMLL World Light Heavyweight Championship, his first singles title in CMLL. Los Guerreros lost and regained the title from L.A. Par-K and Shocker in early 2004, but Bucanero suffered a knee injury and was temporarily replaced by Black Warrior; they lost the title to Atlantis and Blue Panther on June 25. In early 2005, Guerrero began a feud with Místico, sparking a tag program pitting him and Bucanero against Místico and Dr. Wagner Jr.

==== Los Guerreros de la Atlantida (2005–2011) ====
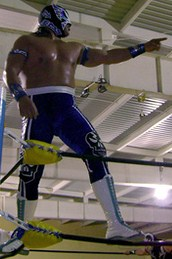
Último Guerrero in December 2010

In late 2005, Guerrero aligned with the now-rudo Atlantis, and Los Guerreros was renamed Los Guerreros de la Atlantida ("The Warriors of the Atlantis"). He and Tarzan Boy eventually ejected Bucanero from the group, tearing up his tights. On July 14, 2006, Bucanero defeated Guerrero for the CMLL World Light Heavyweight Championship, ending his three-and-a-half year reign. On July 13, 2007, Guerrero and Dr. Wagner Jr. defeated Casas and Místico for the CMLL World Tag Team Championship, but lost it in a rematch the following week, marking the shortest reign in the title's history. On July 18, 2008, he and Dragón Rojo Jr. defeated Dos Caras Jr. and Metalik in the finals of that year's Torneo Gran Alternativa. On August 5, Guerrero, Atlantis and Casas defeated El Hijo del Fantasma, Héctor Garza and La Máscara for the CMLL World Trios Championship, which they successfully defended against Alex Shelley, Chris Sabin and Sonjay Dutt at the CMLL 75th Anniversary Show on September 19.

On December 22, Guerrero defeated Dos Caras Jr. to win his first CMLL World Heavyweight Championship. They lost the tag team titles back to El Hijo del Fantasma, Garza and La Máscara on January 18, 2009. Guerrero made his first successful title defense against Garza on February 16. At Homenaje a Dos Leyendas ("Homage to Two Legends") on March 20, he defeated Villano V in a Lucha de Apuestas, forcing him to unmask and reveal his real name, Ray Mendoza Jr. On April 2, Guerrero retained the title against him at an independent show in Gómez Palacio, marking the first time the CMLL World Heavyweight Championship was defended on a non-CMLL show. On June 19, Guerrero defeated Texano Jr. to win the Universal Championship tournament. He retained the title against Garza on July 27 (via countout) and August 17. At the CMLL 76th Anniversary Show on September 18, Guerrero, Atlantis, Garza and Warrior lost to La Ola Amarilla (Jushin Thunder Liger, Naito, Okumura and Yujiro). Guerrero retained the title against Liger seven days later. After another successful defense against Garza on January 22, 2010, Guerrero was paired with tecnico Stuka Jr. for the following week's Torneo Nacional de Parejas Increíbles ("National Incredible Pairs Tournament"), defeating Brazo de Plata and Ray Mendoza Jr. in the first round, but lost to Garza and Toscano in the quarter-finals. At Homenaje a Dos Leyendas on March 19, he, Atlantis and Bucanero lost to Casas, Garza and Máximo. For that year's Torneo Gran Alternativa on April 23, Guerrero and Puma King defeated Pegasso and Toscano in the first round and Durango Kid and Texano Jr. in the quarter-finals, before losing to Delta and Volador Jr. in the semi-finals.

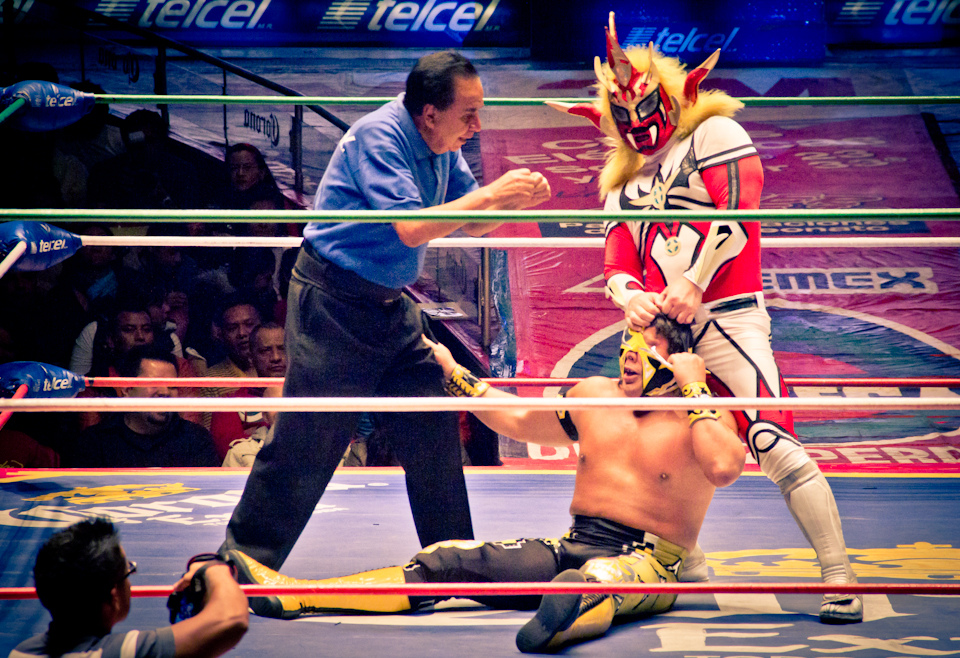
Jushin Thunder Liger tearing at Guerrero's mask in December 2011

At the Promociones Gutiérrez 1st Anniversary Show on July 12, Guerrero partnered with Averno in a match where ten men from five pareja incredibles ("incredible pairs") teams put their mask on the line, with the losing team being forced to wrestle each other for their masks; they faced Atlantis and Olímpico, Místico and El Oriental, Histeria and La Sombra and Volador Jr. and El Alebrije. They were the third team to escape the match. On September 3, Guerrero again retained his mask in a 14-man steel cage Lucha de Apuestas in the main event of the CMLL 77th Anniversary Show, being the eighth to leave the cage. On November 2, Guerrero and Dragón Rojo Jr. defeated Los Invasores (Garza and Mr. Águila) to win the CMLL World Tag Team Championship, after which he officially joined Los Guerreros de la Atlantida. For the Torneo Nacional de Parejas Increíbles on February 11, 2011, Guerrero and Ángel de Oro defeated El Terrible and Toscano in the first round, but lost to Blue Panther and Dragón Rojo Jr. in the quarter-finals. On April 8, he became the first three-time Torneo Gran Alternativa winner alongside Escorpión. Meanwhile, he retained his title against Mr. Niebla, Goto, and Rush. After weeks of tension between Guerrero and Atlantis, CMLL held a press conference on August 11, where Atlantis turned tecnico and left Los Guerreros de la Atlantida. The next day, Guerrero lost the CMLL World Heavyweight Championship to Garza, ending his reign at 963 days.

==== Feud with Atlantis (2011–2014) ====
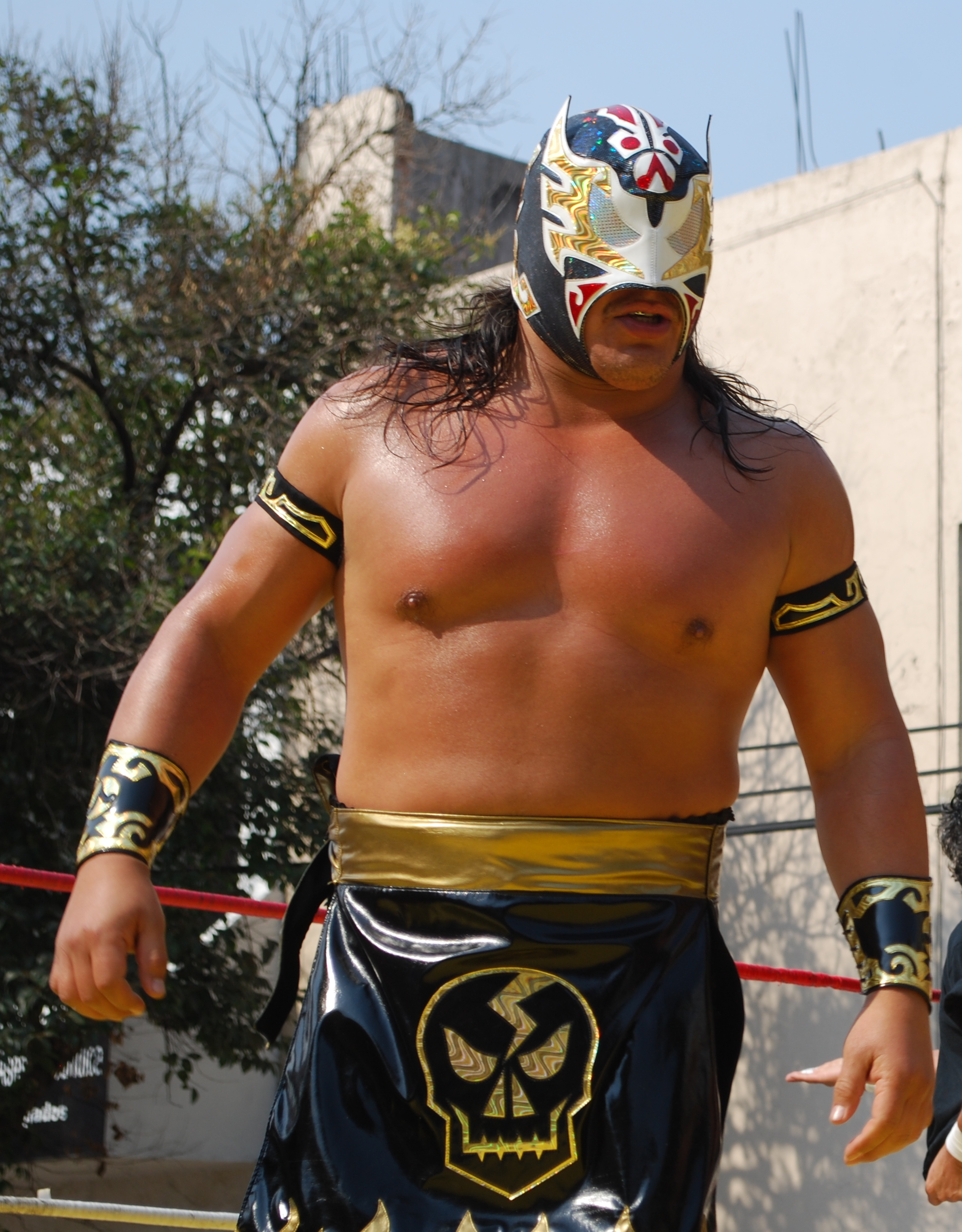
Guerrero in January 2013

Guerrero lost to Atlantis in their grudge match on September 23. He teamed with Marco Corleone for the Torneo Nacional de Parejas Increíbles on February 24, 2012, defeating El Hijo del Fantasma and Misterioso II in the first round and Escorpión and Warrior in the quarter-finals, before losing to Dragon Lee and Rush in the semi-finals. At Homenaje a Dos Leyendas on March 2, he, Bucanero and Volador Jr. lost to Corleone, Diamante Azul and La Máscara. Later that month, Guerrero introduced Niebla Roja as his partner in the Torneo Gran Alternativa on March 30; they defeated La Máscara and Pegasso in the first round before losing to Lee and Rush in the quarter-finals. In July, he fired Escorpión from Los Guerreros del Infierno, replacing him with Roja and Euforia. On August 3, Guerrero and Dragón Rojo Jr. lost the CMLL World Tag Team Championship to Atlantis and Azul, ending their reign at 640 days. At the CMLL 79th Anniversary Show on September 14, he, Casas and Dragón Rojo Jr. defeated Atlantis, Místico and Prince Devitt.

In early 2013, Guerrero and Atlantis were forced to put their differences aside for the Torneo Nacional de Parejas Increibles, defeating Valiente and Pólvora, Azul and Euforia and Dragón Rojo Jr. and Roja en route to the finals, which they lost to La Sombra and Volador Jr. at Homenaje a Dos Leyendas on March 15. After the match, Atlantis attacked Guerrero and tore his mask apart. He then challenged Guerrero to a Lucha de Apuestas, which was not immediately accepted. They officially signed a contract for the mask vs. mask match on March 21, albeit with no date announced. On May 3, Guerrero introduced his brother, "Gran Guerrero", as the two attacked Atlantis and tore his mask apart. He unsuccessfully challenged Azul for the NWA World Historic Light Heavyweight Championship on July 22 and Escorpión for the CMLL World Light Heavyweight Championship on August 19. At the CMLL 80th Anniversary Show on September 13, Guerrero and Atlantis teamed in a Relevos Suicidas match for the mask vs. mask match opportunity, but lost to La Sombra and Volador Jr., who advanced to the Lucha de Apuestas against each other.

After defeating CMLL World Trios Champions Los Estetas del Aire (Máscara Dorada, Místico and Valiente) at Homenaje a Dos Leyendas on March 21, 2014, Guerrero, Euforia and Roja won their titles in a rematch seven days later. On June 20, Guerrero was the last wrestler eliminated by Atlantis in the Leyenda de Azul ("The Blue Legend") tournament. On August 29, Guerrero defeated La Sombra to become the first two-time winner of the Universal Championship tournament. In their highly anticipated mask vs. mask match, Guerrero lost to Atlantis in the main event of the CMLL 81st Anniversary Show on September 19, thus being forced to unmask and reveal his birth name, José Gutiérrez Hernández.

==== Los Guerreros Laguneros (2014–present) ====
Los Guerreros Laguneros lost their championship to Sky Team (Místico, Valiente and Volador Jr.) on February 13, 2015. On February 27, he and Atlantis reunited for the Torneo Nacional de Parejas Increibles, defeating Ángel de Oro and Hechicero in the first round and Rush and Shocker in the quarter-finals, before losing in the semi-finals to El Terrible and Máximo. On July 17, Guerrero won Escorpión's hair in a Lucha de Apuestas at Sin Salida ("No Escape"). He defeated La Sombra on August 31 to capture the NWA World Historic Middleweight Championship. At the CMLL 82nd Anniversary Show on September 18, he, Shocker and Volador Jr. defeated Corleone, Rush and Thunder, who would cost Guerrero in the finals of the Universal Championship tournament on October 16 against Atlantis. At the CMLL 83rd Anniversary Show on September 2, 2016, Los Guerreros failed to regain the trios championship from Sky Team. Two months later, Guerrero defeated Valiente to win the Leyenda de Azul. As part of the Torneo Nacional de Parejas Increíbles on February 17, 2017, he and Valiente defeated Dragon Lee and La Máscara, Místico and Casas and Atlantis and Euforia to advance to the following week's finals, which Bárbaro Cavernario and Volador Jr. won.

Guerrero retained his NWA World Historic Middleweight Championship against Matt Taven at Homenaje a Dos Leyendas on March 17, Atlantis on April 14 and Carístico on May 1. He teamed with Sansón for the following month's Torneo Gran Alternativa, defeating Espanto Jr. and Kraneo in the first round, Blue Panther and Pegasso in the quarter-finals and Atlantis and Esfinge in the semi-finals, but lost to Carístico and Soberano Jr. in the finals on June 16. The next month, Guerrero entered the Universal Championship tournament, defeating Corleone in the first round, Azul in the quarter-finals and Roja, who had since deflected from Los Guerreros, in the semi-finals. He lost to Volador Jr. in the finals on July 14. Three days later, he retained the title against Roja. At the CMLL 84th Anniversary Show on September 16, he, Mephisto and Satoshi Kojima lost to Carístico, Flip Gordon and Volador Jr. On February 9, 2018, Guerrero and Volador Jr. teamed in the Torneo Nacional de Parejas Increíbles, defeating Cavernario and Titán in the first round, Azul and Pierroth in the quarter-finals and Mephisto and Místico in the semi-finals, before losing to El Terrible and Rush in the finals later that month. On March 16, Los Guerreros lost to Atlantis, Roja and Taven at Homenaje a Dos Leyendas. On May 7, Guerrero and Carístico unsuccessfully challenged Valiente and Volador Jr. for the CMLL World Tag Team Championship. Four days later, Guerrero entered the Torneo Gran Alternativa with Templario, defeating Máscara Año 2000 and Universo 2000 Jr., Audaz and Kraneo and Carístico and Star Jr. en route to the finals, which they lost to Flyer and Volador Jr. on May 18.

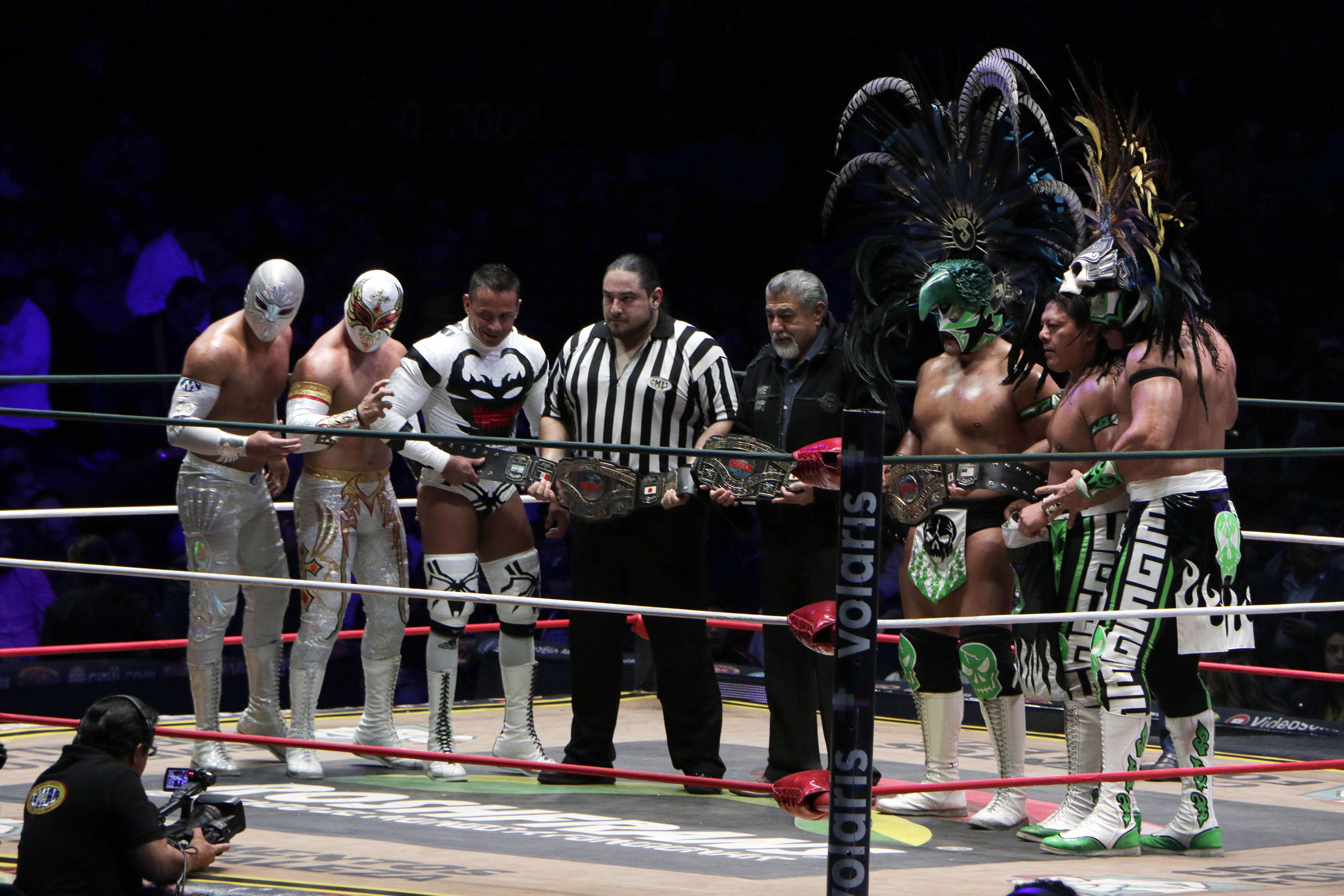
CMLL World Trios Champions Los Guerreros Laguneros (right) and challengers Carístico, Místico and Volador Jr. (left) before a match in November 2018

On July 1, Los Guerreros defeated Sky Team for Guerrero's fourth CMLL World Trios Championship reign, although he lost the NWA World Historic Middleweight Championship to Carístico on August 21. At the same time, Los Guerreros feuded with former Lucha Libre AAA Worldwide stars "The Cl4n" (Ciber the Main Man, The Chris and Sharlie Rockstar), whom they lost the title to at the CMLL 85th Anniversary Show on September 14, but regained it two weeks later. On October 16, Guerrero defeated Azul to win his second CMLL World Heavyweight Championship, making his first successful defense against Sansón on November 19. During this time, he recruited Templario as the fourth member of Los Guerreros. At Homenaje a Dos Leyendas on March 15, 2019, they successfully defended the trios title against Carístico, Dragon Lee and Volador Jr. At Juicio Final ("Final Justice") on May 31, he won a Lucha de Apuestas against Máscara Año 2000, who was forced to be shaved bald. Guerrero then became involved in a multi-man storyline including Big Daddy, Casas, Cavernario, Ciber the Main Man, Gilbert el Boricua and Volador Jr., all of whom fought in a steel cage match at the CMLL 86th Anniversary Show on September 27, where Guerrero pinned Casas to shave him bald. In September 2020, Guerrero was pulled from the CMLL 87th Anniversary Show after testing positive for COVID-19. On March 26, 2021, Los Guerreros lost the CMLL World Trios Championship to Nueva Generación Dinamita (El Cuatrero, Forastero and Sansón), causing Euforia to leave the group. At the CMLL 88th Anniversary Show on September 24, Guerrero lost the CMLL World Heavyweight Championship to Hechicero.

During a six-man tag team match on January 22, 2022, while on opposing sides, Último Guerrero turned on Templario by ripping his mask, ending his time with Los Guerreros. At the CMLL 89th Anniversary Show on September 16, Guerrero and Averno lost to Atlantis Jr. and Stuka Jr. in the finals of the Cuadrangular Eliminatorio de Parejas Increíbles ("Incredible Pairs Elimination Quadrangular"), where the winners advanced to the main event in a Lucha de Apuestas. Guerrero and Atlantis participated in the Torneo Nacional de Parejas Increíbles on February 10, 2023, losing to Averno and Místico in the first round. At the CMLL 90th Anniversary Show on September 16, he and Averno lost to Ángel de Oro and Volador Jr. At Homenaje a Dos Leyendas on March 29, 2024, Guerrero, Blue Panther, Místico and Volador Jr. defeated Bryan Danielson, Claudio Castagnoli, Jon Moxley and Matt Sydal. He teamed with Atlantis Jr. and Volador Jr. to defeat Kojima, Orange Cassidy and Rocky Romero at the CMLL 91st Anniversary Show on September 16. On September 19, 2025, at the CMLL 92nd Anniversary Show, he and Averno were the second team eliminated by Esfinge and Valiente in a three-way elimination tag team match where the winners advanced to a Lucha de Apuestas in the main event. After Castagnoli became CMLL World Heavyweight Champion, Guerrero unsuccessfully challenged him for the title twice. At Homenaje a Dos Leyendas on March 20, 2026, Guerrero competed in a torneo cibernetico for the Copa Infernal, where he eliminated Euforia, who then distracted the referee to help Averno eliminate him for the victory.

=== New Japan Pro-Wrestling (2003–present) ===
In 2003, Último Guerrero made his debut for New Japan Pro-Wrestling (NJPW) as part of the "Strong Energy" tour from April 18 to 29, teaming with Rey Bucanero and facing the likes of Jado & Gedo, AKIRA, Heat and Super Crazy. He returned at Wrestle Kingdom IV on January 4, 2010, where he and Averno unsuccessfully challenged Apollo 55 (Prince Devitt and Ryusuke Taguchi) for the IWGP Tag Team Championship. At Destruction '11 on October 10, 2011, Guerrero again returned to team with Shinsuke Nakamura in a loss to Hirooki Goto and Tama Tonga.

From January 14 to 19, 2014, Guerrero worked the Fantastica Mania 2014 tour, co-produced by NJPW and CMLL. In January 2015, Guerrero took part in the Fantastica Mania 2015 tour, where he defeated Atlantis in a rematch. In January 2018, during the Fantastica Mania 2018 tour, he and Gran Guerrero won the inaugural CMLL Brothers tag team tournament, defeating Ángel de Oro and Niebla Roja and Dragon Lee and Místico. Guerrero successfully defended the CMLL World Heavyweight Championship against Satoshi Kojima in January 2020 during the Fantastica Mania 2020 tour. In February 2023, during the revived Fantastica Mania 2023 tour, Guerrero and Atlantis Jr., under the Los Guerreros de la Atlantida name, won the Interfaction Tag Team Tournament by defeating Los Depredadores (Magia Blanca and Volador Jr.) in the first round and Los Ingobernables de Japón (BUSHI and Titán) in the finals. At Lonestar Shootout on November 10, Guerrero, Hechicero and Rocky Romero lost to Atlantis, Máscara Dorada and Tiger Mask. During the Fantastica Mania 2024 tour in February 2024, he and Stuka Jr. defeated Los Depredadores in the finals of that year's Interfaction Tag Team Tournament. In February 2026, Guerrero and SHO lost to El Sky Team (Dorada and Místico) in the first round of the Fantastica Mania 2026 Tag Team Tournament.

=== Total Nonstop Action Wrestling (2008) ===
In 2008, the Orlando, Florida-based Total Nonstop Action Wrestling (TNA) invited Último Guerrero and Rey Bucanero, along with Averno and Volador Jr. to compete in the 2008 TNA World X Cup Tournament, making them that year's "Team Mexico" entrants, with Guerrero serving as the team captain. Guerrero and Bucanero defeated Team Japan's "Speed Muscle" (Masato Yoshino and Naruki Doi). In the second round, Guerrero lost to Team TNA's Kaz. Team Mexico was eliminated in a 12-man elimination match at Victory Road on July 13, however, Volador Jr. won an Ultimate X match later that night, earning enough points for Team Mexico to win the entire tournament, becoming the 2008 World X Cup holders.

=== Ring of Honor (2016–2019) ===
On October 29, 2016, through CMLL's working relationship with Ring of Honor (ROH), Guerrero made his ROH debut in Baltimore, teaming with Hechicero and Okumura in a tournament to determine the inaugural ROH World Six-Man Tag Team Champions. They defeated The Addiction (Christopher Daniels and Frankie Kazarian) and Kamaitachi in the first round, but lost to The Kingdom (Matt Taven, T. K. O'Ryan and Vinny Marseglia) in the semi-finals. He returned at the Best in the World pay-per-view on June 23, 2017, teaming with El Terrible to defeat Taven and Marseglia. In August, he participated in the War of the Worlds UK tour, promoted by CMLL, NJPW, ROH and Revolution Pro Wrestling (RevPro). On the first night, Guerrero and Bucanero lost to The Addiction. They then defeated Místico and Titán on the second night and The Briscoes (Jay Briscoe and Mark Briscoe) on the third. At Manhattan Mayhem on March 3, 2018, he and Jay Lethal lost to Dalton Castle and Volador Jr. Guerrero made his final ROH appearance at Unauthorized on November 3, 2019, defeating Jonathan Gresham.

=== All Elite Wrestling (2024) ===
Guerrero made his All Elite Wrestling (AEW) debut on the June 22, 2024 episode of Collision (taped two days earlier), where he lost to Kazuchika Okada in a AEW Continental Championship eliminator match.

=== Major League Wrestling (2024–2025) ===
On April 2, 2024, Major League Wrestling (MLW) announced that Último Guerrero would make his debut at Azteca Lucha in Chicago on May 11, losing to Atlantis Jr. At Holiday Rush on December 24, Guerrero unsuccessfully challenged Satoshi Kojima for the MLW World Heavyweight Championship. At Battle Riot VII on April 5, 2025, he participated in the 40-man Battle Riot for the title, where he eliminated Atlantis before being eliminated by Mr. Thomas.

At a CMLL vs. MLW event in Arena México on May 2, Guerrero defeated Matthew Justice to win the MLW National Openweight Championship. He made his first successful title defense against Bárbaro Cavernario and Zandokan Jr. in a three-way match on May 10 at Azteca Lucha. After the match, Guerrero was attacked backstage by Alexander Hammerstone. This led to him retaining the title against Hammerstone in a three-way match also involving Justice at Summer of the Beasts on June 26. Guerrero was then announced as a participant in the Opera Cup tournament, defeating Esfinge in the first round at Fightland on September 13. On September 21, Guerrero lost the title to Blue Panther. He lost to Místico in the tournament quarter-final at Slaughterhouse on October 4.

== Personal life ==
Despite not finishing high school due to his wrestling training, Gutiérrez studied welding and completed four distinct courses: electric, oxyacetylene, torch cutting and sheet metal work. He used this to provide for himself when he first arrived in Mexico City in 1995, constructing animal cages for a veterinary supply factory in La Merced that Fuerza Guerrera had secured him employment at. It also helped him secure his spot in Promo Azteca, where he was put in charge of building, assembling and dismantling the lighting rigs.

Many sources mistakenly list Hooligan and Ephesto as brothers of José Gutiérrez, but they are not blood relatives. Gutiérrez, Ephesto and Hooligan trained together and became close friends, often referring to each other as "brother" without having any blood relationship. Hooligan and Ephesto are brothers, which is why Ephesto is sometimes mistaken for Gutiérrez's brother as well. In 2008, Último Guerrero introduced "Último Guerrero Jr." to the wrestling world. While it is not uncommon for fake relatives to be promoted in lucha libre, it is believed that Último Guerrero Jr. is indeed the son of Último Guerrero. Later on, Guerrero Jr. would be reintroduced as Gran Guerrero, with the storyline explanation being that Gran Guerrero was the much younger brother of Último Guerrero.

On May 19, 2017, footage emerged of Daniel Alvarado (Brazo de Platino) and other members of the Alvarado family, notably his nephews José (Máximo Sexy), Felipe Alvarado (La Máscara), Psycho Clown and Robin, destroying a Ford Mustang belonging to Gutiérrez. The vandalism was reportedly motivated by the fact that Gutiérrez had spoken out against Felipe Alvarado as a possible head of the wrestlers' union after the death of Alvarado's father. The head of the CMLL wrestlers' union had been in the Alvarado family for over a decade, and the Alvarado family believed it should go to someone in their family. The following day, CMLL reportedly fired both Felipe and José Alvarado.

He is married to Lluvia, and is the step-father to her daughter Tabata. He also has at least two daughters named Sheila and Paola, and a son with Lluvia born circa-2017.

== Championships and accomplishments ==
- Consejo Mundial de Lucha Libre
  - CMLL World Heavyweight Championship (2 times)
  - CMLL World Light Heavyweight Championship (1 time)
  - CMLL World Tag Team Championship (6 times) – with Rey Bucanero (3), Dr. Wagner Jr. (1), Atlantis (1) and Dragón Rojo Jr. (1)
  - CMLL World Trios Championship (5 times) – with Atlantis and Tarzan Boy (1), Atlantis and Negro Casas (1), Euforia and Niebla Roja (1) and Euforia and Gran Guerrero (2)
  - NWA World Historic Middleweight Championship (1 time)
  - Carnaval Incredible Tournament (2000) – with Rey Bucanero and Mr. Niebla
  - Copa de Arena Mexico: 1999 – with El Satánico and Rey Bucanero
  - Copa Bobby Bonales (2014)
  - International Gran Prix (2006, 2007)
  - Leyenda de Azul (2016)
  - Torneo Gran Alternativa (1999 – with Blue Panther), (2008 – with Dragón Rojo Jr.), (2011 – with Rey Escorpión)
  - Universal Championship (2009, 2014)
  - Torneo Siglo XXI 2000
  - CMLL Rudo of the Year (2009)
  - CMLL Tag Team of the Year (2010) – with Atlantis
  - Copa Herdez (2010) - with Rey Bucanero
  - Torneo de Parejas Increibles Internacionales (2016) - with Atlantis
  - Copa 70 Aniversario de la Arena Mexico (with Mistico, Ángel de Oro and Bárbaro Cavernario)
- Federacion Mundial de Lucha Libre
  - Champion du Monde (1 time)
- International Wrestling Revolution Group
  - Copa Higher Power (1999) – with Astro Rey Jr., Máscara Mágica, Rey Bucanero and El Satánico
- Lucha Libre Azteca
  - Azteca Championship (2 times)
- Major League Wrestling
  - MLW National Openweight Championship (1 time)
- New Japan Pro-Wrestling
  - CMLL's Brother Tag Team Tournament (2018) – with Gran Guerrero
  - Interfaction Tag Team Tournament (2023 – with Atlantis Jr.), (2024 – with Stuka Jr.)
- Pro Wrestling Illustrated
  - Ranked No. 10 of the top 500 singles wrestlers in the PWI 500 in 2009
- Toryumon Mexico
  - Copa Mundial (2014)
  - Copa NSK (2013)
- Total Nonstop Action Wrestling
  - TNA World X Cup (2008) – with Volador Jr., Rey Bucanero and Averno
- Universal Wrestling Entertainment
  - UWE Tag Team Championship (1 time) – with Atlantis
- World Wrestling Association
  - WWA World Tag Team Championship (1 time) – with Perro Aguayo Jr.
- Wrestling Observer Newsletter
  - Best Tag Team of the Decade (2000–2009) – with Rey Bucanero
  - Wrestling Observer Newsletter Hall of Fame (Class of 2019)
- Miscellaneous
  - Laguna Tag Team Championship (1 time) - with Super Punk

== Luchas de Apuestas record ==
Winner (wager)	Loser (wager)	Location	Event	Date	Notes
Último Guerrero (mask)	Mr. Águila (mask)	Mexico City, Mexico	CMLL 65th Anniversary Show	September 11, 1998	
Último Guerrero (mask)	Difunto II (mask)	Monterrey, Nuevo León	Live event	August 3, 2001	
Último Guerrero (mask)	Cuchillo (hair)	Mexico City, Mexico	Live event	November 17, 2002	
Último Guerrero (mask)	Stuka (hair)	Gómez Palacio, Durango	Live event	June 10, 2006	
Último Guerrero (mask)	Guerrero Zulú (mask)	Chiapas, Mexico	Live event	September 29, 2007	
Último Guerrero (mask)	Super Parka (hair)	Monterrey, Nuevo León	Live event	November 3, 2007	
Último Guerrero (mask)	Villano V (mask)	Mexico City, Mexico	2009 Homenaje a Dos Leyendas	March 20, 2009	
Último Guerrero (mask)	Scorpio Jr. (hair)	Toluca, Mexico State	Live event	November 19, 2010	(Note: This was a Ruleta Rusa (Russian roulette) match that also included Toscano, Místico, El Sagrado, Misterioso II, El Felino and Shigeo Okumura)
Atlantis (mask)	Último Guerrero (mask)	Mexico City, Mexico	CMLL 81st Anniversary Show	September 19, 2014	
Último Guerrero (hair)	Rey Escorpión (hair)	Mexico City	Sin Salida (2015)	July 17, 2015	
Último Guerrero (hair)	Scorpio Jr. (hair)	Pachuca, Hidalgo	Live event	November 3, 2016	(Note: Last two wrestlers in a steel cage match that also included Lizmark Jr., El Terrible, Vangelis, and Alan Stone.)
Último Guerrero (hair)	Corsario Negro Jr. (hair)	Ciudad Nezahualcóyotl, State of Mexico	FILLM event	November 3, 2018	
Último Guerrero (hair)	Máscara Año 2000 (hair)	Mexico City	Juicio Final	May 31, 2019	
Último Guerrero (hair)	Negro Casas (hair)	Mexico City	CMLL 86th Anniversary Show	September 27, 2019	(Note: Last two men in a steel cage match that also included Bárbaro Cavernario, Big Daddy, Ciber the Main Man, Gilbert el Boricua, and Volador Jr.)
