= Súper Astro Jr. =

Mexican professional wrestler

Personal information
- Born: June 12, 1996 (age 29) Mexico City, Mexico
- Parent: Súper Astro (father)

Professional wrestling career
- Ring names: King Star; Súper Astro Jr.
- Billed height: 1.60 m (5 ft 3 in)
- Billed weight: 75 kg (165 lb)
- Trained by: Lizmark; El Solar; Súper Astro; Virus; Franco Columbo
- Debut: August 17, 2014

Súper Astro Jr. (Spanish for "Super Star Jr.", born June 12, 1996) is the ring name (Note: Traditionally, Mexican sources will not report on the birth name of a masked wrestler who has never been unmasked in the ring.) of a Mexican professional wrestler who worked for Consejo Mundial de Lucha Libre (CMLL) as a tecnico (the protagonist or face characters in professional wrestling). He is a second-generation wrestler, son of Súper Astro and wears the same mask as his father. He originally worked under the name King Star but later adopted his father's name.

== Early life ==
Súper Astro Jr., born June 12, 1996, son of Juan Zezatti Ramírez, better known as the professional wrestler Súper Astro. Súper Astro Jr.'s real name has not been revealed, nor reported on, which is a tradition in Lucha Libre when a wrestler has not been unmasked.

Growing up he was interested in various sports, not just professional wrestling, and originally focused on baseball. At age 12 he was given an opportunity to play baseball at the highest national level for his age, but personal circumstances prevented it from happening, instead it encouraged him to focus on wrestling. While professional wrestling is his focus, he also plays baseball in the local Cuemanco baseball league as a third baseman. He previously worked as an auto mechanic and later on as a physiotherapist before dedicating his focus to wrestling full time.

== Professional wrestling career ==
=== Early career (2014–2018) ===
He started out his professional wrestling career in 2014, at the age of 17 or 18. He initially wrestled under the ring name "King Star" and wore a mask that did not resemble that of his father, allowing him to get in-ring experience without the pressure of the Súper Astro.

In 2015 he adopted the "Súper Astro Jr." name, earning the nickname "'Heredero de un legado galáctico'" (Spanish for 'Heir to a galactic legacy). His first confirmed match as Súper Astro Jr. took place on December 11, 2015, as he teamed up with Mimo to defeat Ejecutor and Tromba on an independent circuit show in Mexico City. He briefly worked for International Wrestling Revolution Group (IWRG), one of Mexico's more well known local wrestling promotions. He was one of 16 men risking their wrestling mask on the outcome of a match for a Promociones R.A. show in Zaragoza, Puebla. In the end Comandante R2 and Cosaco Loco lost the match and Súper Astro Jr. retained his mask.

=== Consejo Mundial de Lucha Libre (2018–2021) ===
In 2018 he began working full time for Consejo Mundial de Lucha Libre (Spanish for "World Wrestling Council"; CMLL), with his first appearance for CMLL being the Copa Nueva Valores ("New values cup") tournament. In the first round he defeated Astral, followed by a loss in the quarter-finals to Yago.CMLL Martes Arena Mexico - TV-Show @ Arena Mexico in Mexico City, Distrito Federal, Mexiko The 2018 Día de Muertos was his first major CMLL show appearance, teaming with Oro Jr. in the opening match, losing to the team of El Coyote and Grako. His first championship opportunity in CMLL came on June 23, 2019, as he and nine other wrestlers competed in a torneo cibernetico elimination match for the vacant CMLL World Lightweight Championship, but was eliminated early on in the match. For the 2019 Gran Alternativa ("Great Alternative") tournament he was teamed up with veteran wrestler Titán for the tournament. The duo defeated Negro Casas and Yago in the first round, but lost to Espanto Jr. and Bárbaro Cavernario in the quarter-finals.

=== Independent circuit ===
CMLL allows their wrestlers to compete on the Independent circuit as long as it does not interfere with their CMLL bookings. Through this arrangement Súper Astro Jr. has been able to work his fathers Tortas Súper Astro shows, teaming with Super Muñeco to defeat Ciclon Infernal and Dragosth on one Tortas Súper Astro show, while he and Kawato-San defeated Imposible and Ricky Marvin on a subsequent. On November 24, 2019, Súper Astro Jr. competed in the "super indy" "Battle of Coacalco" tournament against wrestlers from various promotions across Mexico. He lost to Iron Kid in the first round of the tournament.

== Championships and accomplishments ==
- Pro Wrestling Illustrated
  - Ranked No. 463 of the top 500 singles wrestlers in the PWI 500 in 2019
