= Euforia (wrestler) =

Mexican professional wrestler

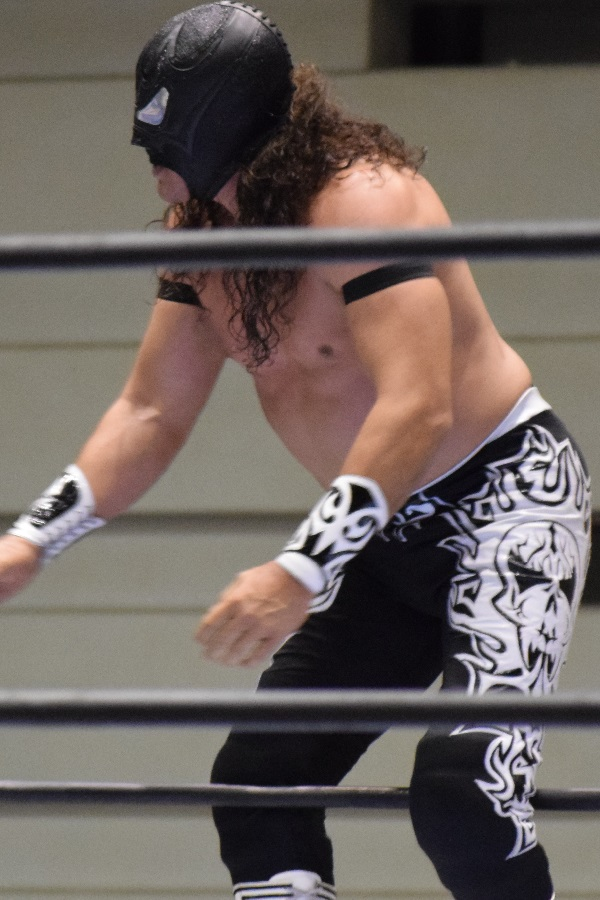
- Euforia in January 2017

Personal information
- Born: December 5, 1974 (age 51) Torreón, Coahuila, Mexico
- Children: El Soberano Jr.
- Parent: El Soberano
- Relatives: Stranger (brother); El Hijo del Soberano (brother)

Professional wrestling career
- Ring names: Soberano Jr.; Euforia
- Billed height: 1.86 m (6 ft 1 in)
- Billed weight: 97 kg (214 lb)
- Trained by: El Satánico; Diabólico; El Soberano
- Debut: May 28, 1990; 2007 (as Euforia)

"¡Místico retuvó su título ante Averno en la funcíón de Navidad!". Consejo Mundial de Lucha Libre (in Spanish). December 25, 2021. Archived from the original on January 20, 2022.

José Leobardo Moreno León (born December 5, 1974), better known by his ring name Euforia, is a Mexican professional wrestler. He is signed to Consejo Mundial de Lucha Libre (CMLL), where he is a member of the Los Infernales stable. A second generation wrestler, Euforia is the father of Soberano Jr., who also wrestles in CMLL.

He began wrestling in 1990 and initially joined CMLL in 2006, before returning full time the following year as Euforia. He was formerly a part of Los Cancerberos del Infierno, under the leadership of Virus, while also forming a tag team with Nosferatu. He was also formerly a part of Los Guerreros del Infierno/Los Guerreros Laguneros, under the leadership of Último Guerrero. Euforia is a five-time CMLL World Trios Champion, one-time CMLL World Tag Team Champion and one-time Mexican National Heavyweight Champion. He has won several tournaments in CMLL, including the Torneo Gran Alternativa (with El Terrible in 2012 and El Coyote in 2021), Torneo Nacional de Parejas Increibles (with Atlantis in 2014), Leyenda de Azul (in 2022) and Copa Dinastías (in 2022 and 2026). He has also wrestled in Japan for New Japan Pro-Wrestling (NJPW), and in the United States for Ring of Honor (ROH).

== Personal life ==
Jose Leobardo Moreno Leon was born on December 5, 1974, in Torreón, Coahuila, Mexico, son of Pablo Moreno Román. Moreno was a professional wrestler known under the ring name "El Soberano" ("the Sovereign"). Euforia's older brother, Pablo Moreno Leon, wrestled under the ring name Stranger until his death in 2000. A younger brother works under the ring name "El Hijo del Soberano" ("The son of El Soberano"). Euforia's son, born on August 12, 1993, followed in his father's and grandfather's footsteps and became a professional wrestler in 2007. He was originally known as "El Nieto del Soberano" ("The Grandson of El Soberano"), but is better known under the ring names El Soberano Jr. / El Soberano, both of which are used interchangeably.

== Professional wrestling career ==
Moreno made his professional wrestling debut on May 28, 1990, under the name "Soberano Jr." ("Sovereign Jr."). He wrestled for many years alongside both his father and his brother on the Mexican independent circuit, especially around his home region in Torreón, Coahuila.

=== Consejo Mundial de Lucha Libre (2006–present) ===
==== Soberano Jr. (2006) ====
Soberano made his Consejo Mundial de Lucha Libre (CMLL) debut on April 23, 2006, in the second match of the show. He only wrestled a limited number of matches, all at Arena Coliseo, before disappearing from CMLL shows.

==== Los Infernales (2007–2009) ====
In 2007, Soberano Jr. returned to CMLL, now repackaged as "Euforia", a darker rudo character (a "heel", those that portray the villains in wrestling) that was paired with El Satánico and Nosferatu to form Los Nuevos Infernales ("The New Infernals"), the latest incarnation of Los Infernales. On June 29, Euforia was one of eight novatos ("rookies") that participated in the Torneo Gran Alternativa ("Great Alternative Tournament"), where an experienced wrestler teams up with a newcomer. He and top rudo Último Guerrero defeated the teams of Súper Comando and Villano V and Dos Caras Jr. and Valiente to earn a spot in the finals, where they lost to La Sombra and Místico. Euforia wrestled in the opening match of the CMLL 74th Anniversary Show on September 28, where he, Loco Max and Nosferatu lost to Metálico, Stuka Jr. and Valiente.

Los Nuevos Infernales entered a tournament for the vacant CMLL Arena Coliseo Tag Team Championship on June 15; Euforia and Nosferatu defeated Los Rayos Tapatio, Metálico and Metalik and Ángel Azteca Jr. and Máscara Purpura en route to the finals on June 28, where they lost to Flash and Stuka Jr. Following this, Los Nuevo Infernales began a long running rivalry with Flash and Stuka Jr., unsuccessfully challenging them for the titles on December 14, but defeating the champions in a non-title match at the La Hora Cero ("Zero Hour") pay-per-view on January 11, 2009. By mid-2009, Euforia began teaming with Nosferatu less frequently, and Nosferatu was replaced by Skándalo in a trios match that saw Euforia, Skándalo and Virus defeat Flash, Stuka Jr. and Metalico at Infierno en el Ring ("Inferno in the Ring") on July 31.

==== Los Cancerberos del Infierno (2009–2012) ====
On November 18, CMLL presented a new rudo group, Los Cancerberos del Infierno ("The Infernal Cerberi"), which was led by Virus and consisted of Euforia and Pólvora, as well as two new characters, Raziel and Cancerbero. In late 2009, Euforia, Pólvora and Virus competed in a tournament to crown new Mexican National Trios Champions, defeating Los Ángeles Celestiales (Ángel Azteca Jr., Ángel de Plata and Ángel de Oro) in the first round, before losing to Máscara Dorada, Metro and Stuka Jr. in the second round. Los Ángeles Celestiales and Los Cancerberos del Infierno developed a rivalry that saw them face off on various CMLL shows, including Super Viernes.

On January 22, 2010, Euforia entered the inaugural Torneo Nacional de Parejas Increíbles ("National Incredible Pairs Tournament"), in which a tecnico and rudo are paired together; each team represented the region they trained in. Euforia and Ephesto, the only "all rudo" team in the group, lost to Averno and Místico in the first round. At Homenaje a Dos Leyendas ("Homage to Two Legends") on March 18, 2011, he, Okumura and Raziel lost to Diamante, Metro and Stuka Jr. On February 17, 2012, he and Guerrero Maya Jr. lost to Dorada and Volador Jr. in the first round of that year's Torneo Nacional de Parejas Increíbles. For the Torneo Gran Alternativa on March 30, Euforia and CMLL World Heavyweight Champion El Terrible defeated Dorada and Titán in the first round, Blue Panther and Rey Cometa in the quarter-finals and Dragon Lee and Rush in the semi-finals. On April 13, they defeated Atlantis and Tritón in the finals to win the tournament. Also that month, he entered the En Busca de un Ídolo ("In Search of an Idol") tournament/reality television show, making it to the finals before losing to Titán.

==== Los Guerreros Laguneros (2012–2021) ====
On July 6, Euforia was named the newest member of Último Guerrero's Los Guerreros del Infierno stable. During the Leyenda de Azul ("The Blue Legend") torneo cibernetico on October 12, he eliminated Diamante before being eliminated by La Sombra. On January 22, 2013, Euforia participated in a torneo cibernetico as part of a tournament to determine the number one contenders for the CMLL World Light Heavyweight Championship. However, he was disqualified in the end when the referee believed that he ripped off Volador Jr.'s mask, although it had actually been done by Rey Escorpión. He and Diamante Azul were paired for the Torneo Nacional de Parejas Increibles on March 8, defeating Ángel de Oro and Ephesto in the first round before losing to Atlantis and Guerrero in the quarter-finals. On September 13, Euforia, Mephisto and Niebla Roja defeated Brazo de Plata, Máximo and Titán at the CMLL 80th Anniversary Show. Euforia and Atlantis participated in the Torneo Nacional de Parejas Increibles on March 14, 2014, defeating Roja and Stuka Jr. in the first round, El Terrible and Marco Corleone in the quarter-finals and Azul and Rey Bucanero in the semi-finals. At Homenaje a Dos Leyendas on March 21, they defeated Escorpión and Máximo in the finals.

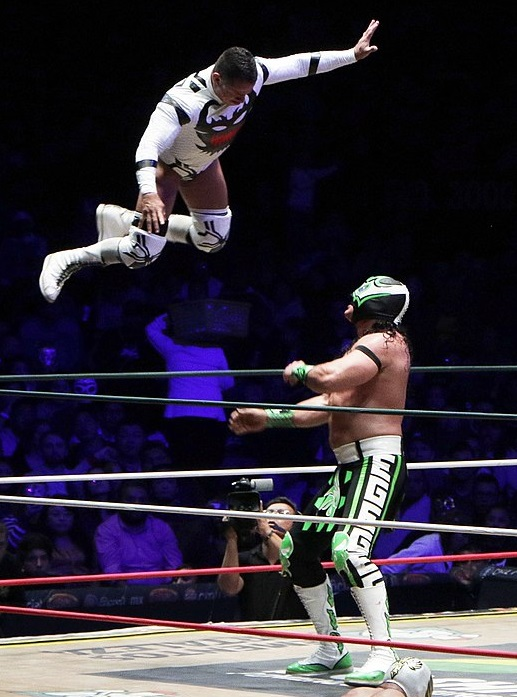
Euforia attempting to catch Volador Jr. in November 2018

Euforia won his first title on March 28, as he, Guerrero and Roja defeated Los Estetas del Aire (Dorada, Místico and Valiente) for the CMLL World Trios Championship. This allowed him to participate in the Universal Championship tournament on August 15, where he defeated El Terrible in the first round, but lost to Shocker in the quarter-finals. On September 14, he unsuccessfully challenged Azul for the NWA World Historic Light Heavyweight Championship. Five days later, at the CMLL 81st Anniversary Show, he, Mr. Niebla and Thunder lost to Dorada, Valiente and Volador Jr. by disqualification. On October 3, he lost to Rush in the first round of the La Copa Junior VIP ("The Junior VIP Cup") tournament. Euforia, Guerrero and Roja lost the championship to Sky Team (Místico, Valiente and Volador Jr.) on February 13, 2015. The following week, he and Valiente lost to La Sombra and Negro Casas in the first round of the Torneo Nacional de Parejas Increibles. At Homenaje a Dos Leyendas on March 20, he, Guerrero and Thunder defeated Los Ingobernables (La Máscara, La Sombra and Rush). On July 27, Euforia failed to win Máximo's CMLL World Heavyweight Championship. Los Guerreros Laguneros failed to regain the title from Sky Team at the CMLL 83rd Anniversary Show on September 2, 2016. During the Leyenda de Azul on November 18, he and Azul were simultaneously disqualified and eliminated for unmasking each other.

At Homenaje a Dos Leyendas on March 17, 2017, Los Guerreros Laguneros lost to Dragon Lee, Stuka Jr. and Titán. Euforia participated in the Reyes del Aire ("Kings of the Air") tournament on April 17, eliminating Carístico and Volador Jr. before being the last wrestler eliminated by Ángel de Oro. On June 6, he was eliminated by Kraneo in a torneo cibernetico for the vacant CMLL World Heavyweight Championship. He was also eliminated by Kenny King in the International Gran Prix on September 1. Euforia was a finalist in the Leyenda de Azul on December 22, lastly being eliminated by Rush. He and Carístico participated in the Torneo Nacional de Parejas Increibles on February 9, 2018, defeating Lee and Sansón in the first round and Corleone and Shocker in the quarter-finals, but lost to El Terrible and Rush in the semi-finals. On March 16, Los Guerreros Laguneros lost to Atlantis, Matt Taven and former stablemate Roja at Homenaje a Dos Leyendas. On May 11, Euforia paired with rookie Akuma for that year's Torneo Gran Alternativa, defeating Astral and Roja in the first round before losing to Carístico and Star Jr. in the quarter-finals. On July 1, Los Guerreros Laguneros ended Sky Team's 1,223-day reign with the CMLL World Trios Championship. They subsequently began a storyline feud with former Lucha Libre AAA Worldwide stars "The Cl4n" (Ciber the Main Man, The Chris and Sharlie Rockstar), whom they lost the title to at the CMLL 85th Anniversary Show on September 14, only to regain it on September 28. On March 16, 2019, Los Guerreros Laguneros retained the CMLL World Trios Championship against Caristico, Dragon Lee and Volador Jr. at Homenaje a Dos Leyendas.

At Juicio Final ("Final Judgement") on May 31, Euforia and Gran Guerrero defeated Azul and Valiente for the CMLL World Tag Team Championship, becoming a double champion. At the CMLL 86th Anniversary Show on September 27, they teamed with Euforia's son, Soberano Jr., in a loss to Ángel de Oro, Mephisto and Roja. Euforia reunited with Akuma for that year's Torneo Gran Alternativa, losing to Star Jr. and Valiente in the first round on October 11. On November 1, he and Guerrero lost the title to Carístico and Místico at Día de Muertos ("Day of the Dead"). On October 23, 2020, Euforia and El Terrible outlasted Atlantis Jr., Azul, Mephisto, Rey Bucanero, Soberano Jr., Stuka Jr., Templario and Valiente to face each other for the vacant Rey del Inframundo ("King of the Underworld") championship the following week at Día de Muertos, which El Terrible won. Following the event, he briefly feuded with stablemate Último Guerrero, unsuccessfully challenging him for the CMLL World Heavyweight Championship on November 27. On March 26, 2021, Los Guerreros Laguneros lost the CMLL World Trios Championship to Nueva Generación Dinamita (El Cuatrero, Forastero and Sansón), resulting in Euforia turning on Guerrero and leaving the stable.

==== Second stint with Los Infernales (2021–present) ====
Euforia (right) and his son Soberano Jr. celebrating after winning the Copa Dinastías in June 2022

At the CMLL 88th Anniversary Show on September 24, Euforia rejoined the reformed Los Infernales alongside El Satánico, Mephisto and Hechicero, who had defeated Guerrero for the CMLL World Heavyweight Championship. On March 4, 2022, Euforia participated in a tournament for the Mexican National Heavyweight Championship, defeating Guerrero in the quarter-finals and Star Black in the semi-finals, before defeating Gran Guerrero in the finals to win the title. However, he lost it in his first defense on April 1 to El Terrible, failing to regain the title on June 21. On August 19, he unsuccessfully challenged stablemate Hechicero for the CMLL World Heavyweight Championship. At the CMLL 89th Anniversary Show on September 16, Los Infernales defeated Negro Casas, Star Jr. and Titán. At Noche de Campeones ("Night of Champions") on September 30, Los Infernales defeated El Sagrado and Los Gemelos Diablo (Gemelo Diablo I and Gemelo Diablo II) to win the CMLL World Trios Championship. On November 25, Euforia won the Leyenda de Azul, lastly eliminating Ángel de Oro. On December 5, he failed to win the CMLL World Heavyweight Championship from Gran Guerrero.

On June 2, 2023, Los Infernales lost the CMLL World Trios Championship to Atlantis Jr., Star Jr. and Volador Jr., after which Hechicero attacked Mephisto and left Los Infernales. Euforia again failed to win the title from Guerrero on November 17. They were paired for the Torneo Nacional de Parejas Increibles on March 15, 2024, but lost to Ángel de Oro and Flip Gordon in the first round. On September 13, at the CMLL 91st Anniversary Show, Euforia lost to Hechicero in a four-way Lucha de Apuestas, which also included Esfinge and Valiente. Per stipulation, Euforia was forced to unmask and revealed his identity, José Leobardo Moreno León. At Noche de Campeones on September 27, Los Infernales, with Averno replacing Hechicero, defeated Máscara Dorada, Neón and Star Jr. to win the CMLL World Trios Championship. On February 18, 2025, Euforia failed to win Guerrero's title in his third attempt. On May 16, Los Infernales lost their championship to El Sky Team (Dorada, Místico and Neón).

On February 27, 2026, Euforia challenged for the CMLL World Heavyweight Championship in a three-way match involving Akuma and new champion Claudio Castagnoli, who retained the title. At Homenaje a Dos Leyendas on March 20, Euforia competed in a torneo cibernetico for the Copa Infernal, where he eliminated Toscano before being eliminated by Último Guerrero. He then distracted the referee, Olímpico, so Averno could eliminate Guerrero for the victory. On May 1, he and Averno unsuccessfully challenged Bishop Dyer and Donovan Dijak for the MLW World Tag Team Championship.

=== New Japan Pro-Wrestling (2013–2020) ===
In January 2013, Euforia made his Japanese debut, when he took part in the three-day Fantastica Mania 2013 tour, co-promoted by CMLL and New Japan Pro-Wrestling (NJPW) in Tokyo. During the first night on January 18, he teamed with Okumura in a loss to Tama Tonga and Titán. The following night, Euforia was defeated in a singles match by Atlantis. During the third and final night, in a six-man tag team main event, Euforia, Kazuchika Okada and Mephisto lost to Atlantis, Hiroshi Tanahashi and Prince Devitt.

Euforia returned to NJPW for a six-man tag team match during the Super J-Cup finals on August 21, 2016, in which he, Gran Guerrero and Último Guerrero lost to Carístico, Titán and Volador Jr. He then participated in the Fantastica Mania 2017 tour in January 2017. Euforia returned to Japan in January 2020 for the Fantastica Mania 2020 tour, where he and his son Soberano Jr. participated in a family tag team tournament. They lost to El Cuatrero and Sansón in the first round, but defeated Negro Casas and Tiger in the third place match.

== Championships and accomplishments ==
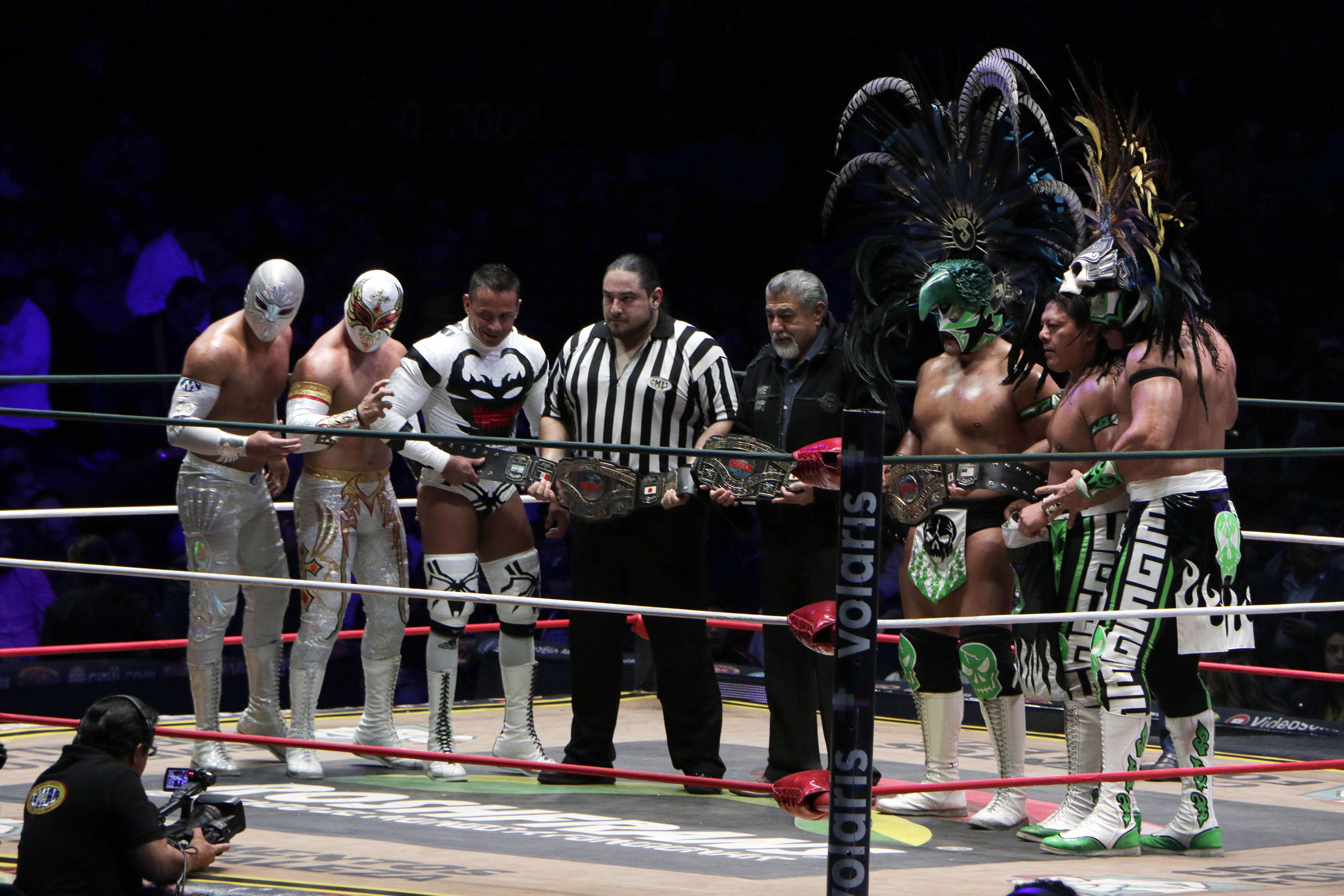
Champions Los Guerreros Lagunero (right) and challengers Carístico, Místico, and Volador Jr. (left) before a match in November 2018.

- Consejo Mundial de Lucha Libre
  - CMLL World Tag Team Championship (1 time) – with Gran Guerrero
  - CMLL World Trios Championship (5 times) – with Niebla Roja and Último Guerrero (1), Gran Guerrero and Último Guerrero (2), Hechicero and Mephisto (1), Averno and Mephisto (1)
  - Mexican National Heavyweight Championship (1 time)
  - CMLL Torneo Gran Alternativa (2012) – with El Terrible
  - CMLL Torneo Gran Alternativa (2021) – with El Coyote
  - CMLL Torneo Nacional de Parejas Increibles (2014) – with Atlantis
  - Copa Dinastías (2022) – with Soberano Jr.
  - Copa Dinistías (2026 - Padres)
  - Leyenda de Azul (2022)
  - Cuadrangular De Dinastias (2024) - with Soberano Jr.
- Pro Wrestling Illustrated
  - Ranked No. 161 of the top 500 singles wrestlers in the PWI 500 in 2021

== Luchas de Apuestas record ==
Winner (wager)	Loser (wager)	Location	Event	Date	Notes
Hechicero (mask)	Euforia (mask)	Mexico City, Mexico	CMLL 91st Anniversary Show	September 13, 2024	
