= Magia Blanca =

Mexican professional wrestler

Personal information
- Born: June 26, 1993 (age 33) Torreón, Coahuila, Mexico
- Family: Bandido (cousin); Myzteziz Jr. (cousin); Gravity (cousin)

Professional wrestling career
- Ring names: Monaguillo I; Magia Blanca; Magnifico I; El Principe
- Billed height: 1.70 m (5 ft 7 in)
- Billed weight: 78 kg (172 lb)
- Trained by: Indio Chirikawa; Stuka; Tony Arellano; Último Guerrero
- Debut: June 19, 2011

Magia Blanca (born June 26, 1993) is a Mexican professional wrestler, previously known by the ring name Magnifico I. He is working with Consejo Mundial de Lucha Libre (CMLL), where he is a former Mexican National Welterweight Champion.

He is a fourth-generation wrestler, the nephew of Apóstol Jr. and cousin of wrestlers Bandido, Gravity and Myzteziz Jr. His real name is not a matter of public record as is often the case with masked wrestlers in Mexico.

== Career ==
Magia Blanca made his in-ring debut on June 19, 2011, in his hometown of Torreón, then under the ring name Magnifico I. Along with his cousin Magnifico II, they formed the group Los Magnificos. The first mach they had was against Vientos Negros. Soon, they founded the trio Reyes del Aire with another relative, Angelikal. The trio wrestled extensively high on the match cards in Coahuila and Durango in 2012 and 2013, published on Ivoox.

=== Consejo Mundial de Lucha Libre (2015–) ===
In 2015, he was signed to Consejo Mundial de Lucha Libre (CMLL) and he was repackaged as Magia Blanca (Spanish for "White Magic"), without changing the design of the mask. After spending the fall of 2015 wrestling at the promotions's minor events in Puebla and Guadalajara, he made his debut in Mexico City on March 22, 2016, during the La Gran Alternativa tournament, which pits an experienced wrestler against a rookie. Magia Blanca teamed up with his trainer Último Guerrero and they made it to the quarter-finals. In 2018, he won the Copa Nuevos Valores tournament, a tournament for new talent in CMLL. In the finals, he defeated Flyer, which earned him a title match against Soberano Jr. over the Mexican National Welterweight Championship. However, Magia Blanca lost that bout two fall to one. At the Gran Alternativa tournament, Flyer gained a measure of revenge where he and Volador Jr. defeated Magia Blanca and Atlantis from the tournament. On May 24 it was revealed that Magia Blanca had suffered a knee injury during a match and would not be able to work for six to nine months.

In 2022, Magia Blanca became part of the stable Los Depredadores alongside Diamond, Magnus, Rugido and Volador Jr. On June 24, 2022, he won the National Welterweight Championship, since Soberano Jr. vacated the title to move up to middleweight. Magia Blanca defeated nine other wrestlers in a tournament to become the new champion. On March 5, 2025, he was kicked out of Los Depredadores. He reigned for almost 4 years & accrued 7 successful defences, before losing the title to Capitán Suicida on Match 31, 2026.

Magia Blanca is also a trainer himself. In February 2026, his students Tornado & Rey Pegasus won that year's Torneo de Escuelas tournament. Blanca officially formed a trio team with them shortly thereafter.

== Championships and accomplishments ==
- Consejo Mundial de Lucha Libre
  - Mexican National Welterweight Championship (1 time)
  - Copa Nuevos Valores (2018)
