= Electrico (wrestler) =

Mexican professional wrestler

Eléctrico
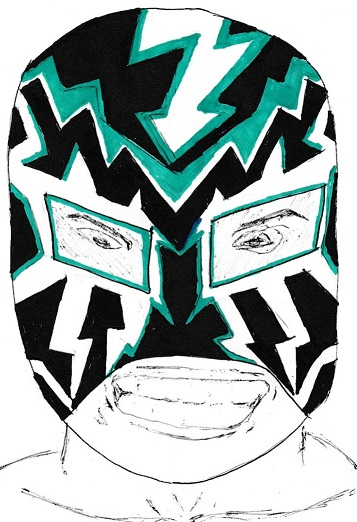
- Artist rendition of Electrico's mask

Personal information
- Born: August 21, 1986 (age 39) Mexico

Professional wrestling career
- Ring name(s): Cosmico; Eléctrico
- Billed height: 1.64 m (5 ft 4 1/2 in)
- Billed weight: 72 kg (159 lb)
- Trained by: Panchito Villalobos; Ringo Mendoza; Arturo Beristain; Satánico
- Debut: July 6, 2006

Eléctrico (born August 21, 1986) is a Mexican professional wrestler, who works for Consejo Mundial de Lucha Libre (CMLL). He is a former and the longest reigning Mexican National Lightweight Champion. Eléctrico's real name is not a matter of public record, as is often the case with masked wrestlers in Mexico where their private lives are kept a secret from the wrestling fans.

From 2006 to 2018 Eléctrico worked in CMLL's Mini-Estrellas division, however that does not mean that Eléctrico has dwarfism as several short wrestlers work in the "Mini" division. In 2018 he was moved from the Mini-Estrellas division to the "regular sized" division. During his career he has won the mask of Pequeño Black Warrior and also won the 2014 Pequeño Reyes del Aire tournament.

== Professional wrestling career ==
Eléctrico began his training at the age of just 15, training under Tony Salazar and Panchito Villalobos and later received further training by Ringo Mendoza, Arturo Beristain and Satánico when he began training at Consejo Mundial de Lucha Libre's (CMLL) wrestling school in Guadalajara, Jalisco. Records are unclear on whether Eléctrico worked as a professional wrestler before he made his debut for CMLL. Since he is masked, his true name is not known, nor are any former ring names he may have used before joining CMLL.

=== Mini-Estrella (2006–2018) ===
He made in-ring his debut for CMLL on July 7, 2006 wrestling as "Eléctrico" an masked wrestler character in CMLL's Mini-Estrellas division who wrestles as a técnico (those who portray "good guy"). While some Mini-Estrellas often wrestle as smaller versions of regular sized wrestlers Eléctrico does not have a larger counterpart. Eléctrico briefly wrestled using a different mask and the name "Cosmico" but soon after reverted to wrestling as Eléctrico and another wrestler was given the Cosmico character instead. The two Mini-Estrellas even teamed up on occasion. In 2008 Eléctrico won the CMLL Physical Fitness contest for the minis division, crediting his mother with instilling in him the work ethic that allowed him to get in good enough shape to win the competition. On September 19, 2008 he was one of 10 wrestlers to compete in a torneo cibernetico where the winner would qualify for the finals of a tournament for the vacant Mexican National Lightweight Championship, but was eliminated by eventual cibernetico winner Mascarita Dorada.

On January 11, 2009 Eléctrico wrestled in the main event of CMLL's La Hora Cero ("Zero Hour") pay-per-view (PPV) as he was one of the 13 Mini-Estrellas that put their mask on the line in a Steel Cage match. Eléctrico was the second wrestler to escape the cage and thus keep his mask safe. In the end Pierrothito pinned Shockercito, forcing him to unmask. Just under two months later, on March 6, 2009, Eléctrico participated in another multi-man cage match where the loser would be unmasked. As with the La Hora Cero match Eléctrico escaped the cage early in the match, leaving Sombrita to be pinned by Mascarita Dorada. On September 18, 2009 Eléctrico wrestled on his first CMLL Anniversary Show, CMLL's biggest and most important show of the year, as he wrestled on the undercard of CMLL's 76th Anniversary Show. Eléctrico teamed with Pequeño Olímpico and Bam Bam as they took on Pierrothito, Pequeño Black Warrior and Pequeño Damián 666 in a six-man "Lucha Libre rules" tag team match. Eléctrico won the match for his team as he forced Pierrothito to submit in the second fall of the match. As a result of his victory over Pierrothito Eléctrico earned a shot at Pierrothito's Mexican National Lightweight Championship the following week. The match was featured on the undercard of the 2009 Torneo Gran Alternativa and saw Pierrothito successfully defend the championship against Eléctrico. He participated in his first ever Pequeño Reyes del Aire ("Little Kings of the Air") tournament on March 7, 2010 but was eliminated halfway through the match before Pequeño Nitro won the tournament. In August CMLL began a "Bicentennial tournament" specifically for the Mini-Estrella division, both to celebrate the 200th anniversary of Mexico as a nation and the 18th anniversary of CMLL's Mini-Estrella division. The prize of the tournament was an opportunity to leave the Mini-Estrellas division and work with the regular male wrestlers of CMLL. Eléctrico was part of the first of two torneo cibernetico elimination matches and was the lastman eliminated as he was pinned by Demus 3:16 pinned him. On December 3, 2010, at Sin Piedad Eléctrico defeated Pequeño Warrior in a Lucha de Apuesta to take his mask.

During a Toryumon Mexico show on August 19, 2012, Eléctrico broke his leg when he hit the steel guard rail outside the ring while performing a high flying, high-risk move. He was in a cast for around 6 weeks, having severely limited mobility while recovering. On October 14, 2010, Toryumon Mexico and CMLL held a joint benefit event for Eléctrico in the same building where he broke his leg. The proceeds from the tickets and an auction of wrestling memorabilia and wrestling gear went to Eléctrico to cover for the fact that he was not able to work. The leg injury required a metal plate and four screws to fix the break, which forced him to spend seven months rehabilitating his injury. During his time off Eléctrico put his electrical engineering degree to use teaching in school. He made his return to the ring on April 1, 2013 in Puebla, Puebla.

On August 13, 2013 Eléctrico defeated Pequeño Nitro in a tournament final to win the vacant Mexican National Lightweight Championship. On January 4, 2014 Eléctrico outlasted 9 other wrestlers to win the 2014 version of the Pequeño Reyes del Aire ("Little Kings of the Air") tournament when Astral was the last man eliminated. Eléctrico was one of 10 Mini-Estrellas who put their mask on the line in a steel cage match in the main event of the Arena Coliseo 71st Anniversary Show. He was the second to last wrestler to leave the catch, watching from the floor as Astral defeated Pequeño Halcón to unmask him. On October 10, 2014 Eléctrico challenged long time tag team partner Astral for the CMLL World Mini-Estrella Championship, losing two falls to one. Eléctrico made his first championship defense approximately 18 months when he defeated Principe Diamante on February 28, 2016 to retain the championship. It would be another six months before Electrico defended the championship, this time defeating Fantasy on August 16, 2016.

=== Regular division (2018–present) ===
On January 12, 2018 it was announced that Eléctrico would no longer compete in the Mini-Estrella division but would from then on compete against CMLL's main male roster. He later revealed that he had requested the move out of the Mini-Estrellas division a year before the move was approved. At the time CMLL did not announce any decisions on the Mexican National Lightweight Championship, which at the time had been exclusively for the Mini-Estrellas division for several years. Eléctrico made his regular roster debut on January 21 teaming with Oro Jr. and Starman to defeat Akuma, Espanto Jr. and Sangre Azteca. In May 2018 Eléctrico competed in his first ever Torneo Gran Alternativa ("Great Alternative tournament"), a tag team tournament where a relative newcomer would be teamed up with an established "veteran". Eléctrico was teamed up with veteran Místico for the tournament, defeating the team of rookie Espanto Jr. and veteran Hechicero in the first round before being eliminated from the tournament by Yago and Mephisto.

He was given his first opportunity to win a championship in the "regular" division in June 2019 as he was one of 10 wrestlers competing for the vacant CMLL World Super Lightweight Championship, but Eléctrico along with El Hijo del Villano III, Flyer, Principe Diamante, Sonic, Star Jr., Súper Astro Jr. and Halcón Suriano Jr. were eliminated from the torneo cibernetico by Audaz and eventual tournament winner Kawato-San. Eléctrico defended the Mexican National Lightweight Championship on August 5, 2019, marking the first time since 2004 that the championship was defended in the regular division, as he defeated Virus.

On December 11, 2021, Eléctrico lost the Mexican National Lightweight Championship to Panterita del Ring Jr.

== Championships and accomplishments ==
- Consejo Mundial de Lucha Libre
  - Mexican National Lightweight Championship (1 time)
  - Mexican National Lightweight Championship Tournament (2013)
  - Pequeño Reyes del Aire (2014)
  - CMLL Bodybuilding Contest - Minis Category (2008)
  - CMLL Bodybuilding Contest - Intermediate Category (2011, 2013)

== Luchas de Apuestas record ==
Winner (wager)	Loser (wager)	Location	Event	Date	Notes
Eléctrico (mask)	Pequeño Black Warrior (mask)	Mexico City	Sin Piedad	December 3, 2010	
