= CMLL Torneo Nacional de Parejas Increíbles (2014) =

2014 Consejo Mundial de Lucha Libre tournament

- Poster for Block B on March 14
- Promotion: Consejo Mundial de Lucha Libre (CMLL)
- Date: March 7, 2014; March 14, 2014; March 21, 2014
- City: Mexico City, Mexico
- Venue: Arena México

Event chronology
← Previous; Torneo Gran Alternativa	Next → Homenaje a Dos Leyendas

CMLL Torneo Nacional de Parejas Increibles tournaments chronology
← Previous; 2013	Next → 2015

The CMLL Torneo Nacional de Parejas Increíbles 2014 or "National Incredible Pairs Tournament 2014" was the fifth of a series of Lucha Libre (professional wrestling) tournaments for tag teams traditionally held early in the year. The tournament was based on the Lucha Libre Parejas Increíbles match type where two wrestlers of opposite allegiance, portraying either villains, referred to as "Rudos" in Lucha Libre wrestling terminology, or fan favorites, or "Technicos". At times some of the team members were part of pre-existing scripted feuds or storylines with each other. The tournament was won by the team of Atlantis and Euforia, marking the fourth time Atlantis has won the tournament.

== Tournament ==
Consejo Mundial de Lucha Libre (CMLL) held their fourth annual Torneo Nacional De Parejas Increíbles tournament between March 7 and March 21, 2014, starting with two opening round groups where the winner of each group will advance to the finals. The finals took place at the 2014 Homenaje a Dos Leyendas, which was the only tournament match contested under best two-out-of-three falls rules. The tournament featured teams of wrestlers who would not usually team up, in fact most of the teams were on opposite sides of the Tecnico/Rudo (Fan favorite/villain) divide and were oftentimes direct rivals.

=== Tournament participants ===
Key

Symbol	Meaning
(T)	This wrestler is a Tecnico
(R)	This wrestler is a Rudo

Block A (March 7, 2014)

- Místico (T) and Reaper (R)
- Titán (T) and El Felino (R)
- Maximo (T) and Rey Escorpión (R)
- Rey Cometa (T) and Pólvora (R)
- La Sombra (T) and Último Guerrero (R)
- Valiente (T) and Vangelis (R)
- Volador Jr. (T) and Averno (R)
- La Máscara (T) and Ephesto (R)

Block B (March 11, 2014)

- Atlantis (T) and Euforia (R)
- Stuka Jr. (T) and Niebla Roja (R)
- Marco Corleone (T) and El Terrible (R)
- Máscara Dorada (T) and Mephisto (R)
- Blue Panther (T) and Negro Casas (R)
- Delta (R) and Mr. Águila (R)
- Diamante Azul (T) and Rey Bucanero (R)
- Brazo de Plata (T) and Kráneo (R)

=== Tournament results ===
First round
Místico and Reaper	W
Titán and El Felino
Rey Cometa and Pólvora
Maximo and Rey Escorpión	W
Valiente and Vangelis
*La Sombra and Último Guerrero	W
Volador Jr. and Averno	W
La Máscara (T) and Ephesto
Atlantis and Euforia	W
Stuka Jr. (T) and Niebla Roja
Máscara Dorada (T) and Mephisto
Marco Corleone and El Terrible	W
Blue Panther and Negro Casas	W
Delta and Mr. Águila
Brazo de Plata and Kráneo
Diamante Azul and Rey Bucanero	W

Second round
Místico and Reaper
Maximo and Rey Escorpión	W
La Sombra and Último Guerrero	W
Volador Jr. and Averno
Atlantis and Euforia	W
Marco Corleone and El Terrible
Blue Panther and Negro Casas
Diamante Azul and Rey Bucanero	W

Semifinals
Maximo and Rey Escorpión	W
La Sombra and Último Guerrero
Atlantis and Euforia	W
Diamante Azul and Rey Bucanero

Finals
Maximo and Rey Escorpión
Atlantis and Euforia	W
