= Torneo Gran Alternativa (2011) =

Mexican professional wrestling tournament

- Official poster for the show, advertising Último Guerrero and Escorpión vs. Metal Blanco and Máscara Dorada in the finals
- Promotion: Consejo Mundial de Lucha Libre
- Date: March 25, 2011 to April 8, 2011
- City: Mexico City, Mexico
- Venue: Arena México

Event chronology
← Previous; Homenaje a Dos Leyendas	Next → Forjando un Ídolo

Torneo Gran Alternativa chronology
← Previous; 2010	Next → 2012

The Torneo Gran Alternativa (2011) was a professional wrestling tournament event held by the Mexican professional wrestling promotion Consejo Mundial de Lucha Libre (CMLL) that took place from March 25 until April 8, 2011 over the course of three CMLL Super Viernes shows. The Torneo Gran Alternativa (Spanish for "the Great Alternative tournament) concept sees a Novato or rookie team up with an experienced wrestler for a tag team tournament. The rookie winner is often elevated up the ranks of CMLL as a result of winning the tournament, but there is no specific "prize" awarded for winning the tournament beyond a symbolic trophy.

The tournament was won by rookie Escorpión and veteran Último Guerrero as they defeated rookie Metal Blanco and veteran Máscara Dorada in the finals. Following the victory Escorpión took the ring name Rey Escorpión ("Scorpion King") and became a member of Último Guerrero's Los Guerreros del Infierno faction in CMLL.

== History ==
Starting in 1994 the Mexican professional wrestling promotion Consejo Mundial de Lucha Libre (CMLL) created a special tournament concept where they would team up a novato, or rookie, with a veteran for a single-elimination tag team tournament. The tournament was called El Torneo Gran Alternativa, or "the Great Alternative Tournament" and became a recurring event on the CMLL calendar. CMLL did not hold a Gran Alternativa tournament in 1997 and 2000 held on each year from 2001 through 2011. The 2011 Gran Alternativa tournament was the 17th overall Gran Alternativa tournament. All tournaments have been held in Arena México, CMLL's main venue and as part of the CMLL Super Viernes show.

== Tournament background ==
The tournament will feature 15 professional wrestling matches with different wrestlers teaming up, some of which may be involved in pre-existing scripted feuds or storylines while others are simply paired up for the tournament. Wrestlers portray either villains (referred to as Rudos in Mexico) or fan favorites (Técnicos in Mexico) as they compete in wrestling matches with pre-determined outcomes. The tournament format follows CMLL's traditional tournament formats, with two qualifying blocks of eight teams that compete on the first and second week of the tournament and a final match between the two block winners. The qualifying blocks were one-fall matches while the tournament finals will be a best two-out-of-three falls tag team match. Each qualifying block started with all 8 Novatos competing in a "seeding" battle royal to determine the brackets for the block.

2012 Gran Alternativa participants

Block	Rookie	Veteran
Block A	Ángel de Plata	Blue Panther
Block A	Diamante	La Sombra
Block A	Escorpión	Último Guerrero
Block A	Fuego	Atlantis
Block A	Hijo del Signo	Mr. Niebla
Block A	Magnus	Brazo de Plata
Block A	Mortiz	El Terrible
Block A	Rey Cometa	Toscano
Block B	Dragon Lee	Volador Jr.
Block B	Guerrero Maya Jr.	Máximo
Block B	Hombre Bala Jr.	La Máscara
Block B	Lestat	Black Warrior
Block B	Metal Blanco	Máscara Dorada
Block B	Puma King	Negro Casas
Block B	Tiger Kid	Mephisto
Block B	Palacio Negro	Averno

On the rookie side Fuego, then known as "Flash" had participated in the 2007Gran Alternativa and was the "rookie" with the longest time between appearances, four years. Rey Cometa had previously participated in the Gran Alternativa 2009 and 2010. Ángel de Plata, Diamante, Guerrero Maya Jr., Puma King and Tiger (As "Tiger Kid") had also competed in the tournament as rookies in previous years. It was the first Gran Alternativa tournament for rookies Escorpión, Hijo del Signo, Magnus, Mortiz, Dragon Lee, Hombre Bala Jr., Lestat, Metal Blanco and Palacio Negro. The veteran field include former Gran Alternativa winners Último Guerrero (both as a rookie and a vet), Negro Casas, Blue Panther, La Sombra, Atlantis and La Máscara (who won as a team).

== Tournament results ==
Block A took place on Friday night March 25, 2011, and saw rookie Escorpión and Último Guerrero defeat three other teams to win their block. The following week Block B took place and was won by Máscara Dorada and Metal Blanco. The finals of the tournament were held on April 8, 2011 where Escorpión and Último Guerrero defeated Máscara Dorada and Metal Blanco two falls to one to win the entire tournament.

=== Tournament brackets ===
First round
Hijo del Signo and Mr. Niebla	W
Ángel de Plata and Blue Panther
Diamante and La Sombra	W
Atlantis and Fuego
Escorpión and Último Guerrero	W
Magnus and Brazo de Plata
Mortiz and El Terrible	W
Rey Cometa and Toscano
Dragon Lee and Volador Jr.	W
Hombre Bala Jr. and La Máscara
Máscara Dorada and Metal Blanco	W
Mephisto and Tiger Kid
Negro Casas and Puma King	W
Guerrero Maya Jr. and Máximo
Averno and Palacio Negro	W
Black Warrior and Lestat

Quarter-finals
Hijo del Signo and Mr. Niebla	W
Diamante and La Sombra
Escorpión and Último Guerrero	W
Mortiz and El Terrible
Dragon Lee and Volador Jr.	W
Máscara Dorada and Metal Blanco
Negro Casas and Puma King	W
Averno and Palacio Negro

Semifinals
Diamante and La Sombra	W
Escorpión and Último Guerrero
Máscara Dorada and Metal Blanco	W
Averno and Palacio Negro

Finals
Escorpión and Último Guerrero	W
Máscara Dorada and Metal Blanco

=== Tournament shows ===
March 25, 2011 Super Viernes

No.	Results	Stipulations
1	Camorra and Semental defeated Bengala and Leono	Best two out of three falls tag team match
2	Dark Angel, Goya Kong and Marcela defeated La Amapola, Mima Shimoda and Princesa Sujei	Six-man "Lucha Libre rules" tag team match
3	Mortiz and Rey Cometa defeated Ángel de Plata, Diamante, Hijo del Signo, Escorpión, Fuego and Magnus	Gran Alternativa 2011 seeding battle royal
4	El Hijo del Signo and Mr. Niebla defeated Ángel de Plata and Blue Panther	Gran Alternativa 2011 first round tag team match
5	Diamante and La Sombra defeated Atlantis and Fuego	Gran Alternativa 2011 first round tag team match
6	Escorpión and Último Guerrero defeated Brazo de Plata and Magnus	Gran Alternativa 2011 first round tag team match
7	El Terrible and Mortiz defeated Rey Cometa and Toscano	Gran Alternativa 2011 first round tag team match
8	Diamante and La Sombra defeated El Hijo del Signo and Mr. Niebla	Gran Alternativa 2011 quarter final tag team match
9	Escorpión and Último Guerrero defeated El Terrible and Mortiz	Gran Alternativa 2011 quarter final tag team match
10	Escorpión and Último Guerrero defeated Diamante and La Sombra	Gran Alternativa 2011 semi-final tag team match
11	Black Warrior, Máscara Dorada and Rush defeated Los Hijos del Averno (Averno and Mephisto) and Hirooki Goto	Six-man "Lucha Libre rules" tag team match

April 1, 2011 Super Viernes

No.	Results	Stipulations
1	Horus and Robin defeated Bronco and Cholo	Best two out of three falls tag team match
2	Los Guerreros Tuareg (Dr. X, Hooligan and Nitro) defeated Metálico, Starman and Tigre Blanco	Six-man "Lucha Libre rules" tag team match
3	Lestat and Palacio Negro defeated Dragon Lee, Guerrero Maya Jr., Hombre Bala Jr., Metal Blanco, Puma King and Tiger Kid	Gran Alternativa 2011 seeding battle royal
4	Dragon Lee and Volador Jr. defeated Hombre Bala Jr. and La Máscara	Gran Alternativa 2011 first round tag team match
5	Máscara Dorada and Metal Blanco defeated Mephisto and Tiger Kid	Gran Alternativa 2011 first round tag team match
6	Negro Casas and Puma King defeated Guerrero Maya Jr. and Maximo	Gran Alternativa 2011 first round tag team match
7	Averno and Palacio Negro defeated Black Warrior and Lestat	Gran Alternativa 2011 first round tag team match
8	Máscara Dorada and Metal Blanco defeated Dragon Lee and Volador Jr.	Gran Alternativa 2011 quarter final tag team match
9	Averno and Palacio Negro defeated Negro Casas and Puma King	Gran Alternativa 2011 quarter final tag team match
10	Máscara Dorada and Metal Blanco defeated Averno and Palacio Negro by disqualification	Gran Alternativa 2011 semi-final tag team match
11	Brazo de Plata, Rush and Strong Man defeated Hirooki Goto and Los Invasores (Mr. Águila and Olímpico)	Six-man "Lucha Libre rules" tag team match

April 8, 2011 Super Viernes

No.	Results	Stipulations
1	Metálico and Trueno defeated Inquisidor and Tiger Kid	Best two out of three falls tag team match
2	Ángel de Plata, Pegasso and Rey Cometa defeated Los Guerreros Tuareg (Arkangel de la Muerte, Nitro and Skándalo)	Six-man "Lucha Libre rules" tag team match
3	El Hijo del Signo defeated Guerrero Maya Jr.	Lightning match (One fall, 10 minute time-limit match)
4	Misterioso II, Okumura and Pólvora defeated Metro, Stuka Jr. and Valiente	Six-man "Lucha Libre rules" tag team match
5	La Sombra, Rush and Strong Man defeated Atlantis, Hirooki Goto and Negro Casas	Six-man "Lucha Libre rules" tag team match
6	Escorpión and Último Guerrero defeated Máscara Dorada and Metal Blanco	Gran Alternativa 2011 final tag team match

== Aftermath ==
In the weeks following the Gran Alternativa tournament, Escorpión modified his name to "Rey Escorpión" ("Scorpion King"), to help emphasize his rise in the ranks of CMLL. He would also join Último Guerrero's faction Los Guerreros del Infierno ("The Warriors of the Inferno") alongside Dragón Rojo Jr. Early in 2012 Rey Escorpión's rise in CMLL continued as he started a feud with Black Warrior, which grew in intensity over the following months. He participated in the 2012 Torneo Nacional De Parejas Increibles where he teamed up with rival Black Warrior, furthering the storyline between the two as their inability to get along caused them to be eliminated by Marco Corleone and Último Guerrero. The storyline with Black warrior reached its conclusion on June 1, 2012, when Rey Escorpión defeated his opponent in a Luchas de Apuestas match, forcing Black Warrior to have his hair shaved off after the match. Rey Escorpión teamed up with rookie Boby Zavala to win the 2013 Gran Alternativa tournament, defeating Hombre Bala Jr. and Atlantis in the finals.

Metal Blanco and Palacio Negro both received new ring name and masks, becoming known as Tritón and Titán respectively. Metal Blanco, as Tritón, would compete n the 2012 Gran Alternativa tournament with no reference to his 2011 participation. He teamed up with Atlantis and made it to the finals before losing to tournament winners Euforia and El Terrible. Palacio Negro, as Titán, also took part in the tournament, teaming with Máscara Dorada, again with no reference to his previous tournament participation.
