= Homenaje a Dos Leyendas (2014) =

Mexican professional wrestling supercard show

- The official poster of the event
- Promotion: Consejo Mundial de Lucha Libre (CMLL)
- Date: March 21, 2014
- City: Mexico City, Mexico
- Venue: Arena México

Pay-per-view chronology
← Previous; CMLL Torneo Nacional de Parejas Increíbles	Next → En Busca de un Ídolo

Homenaje a Dos Leyendas chronology
← Previous; 2013	Next → 2015

Homenaje a Dos Leyendas (2014) (Spanish for "Homage to Two Legends") was a professional wrestling supercard show event, scripted and produced by Consejo Mundial de Lucha Libre (CMLL; "World Wrestling Council"). The Dos Leyendas show took place on March 21, 2014 in CMLL's main venue, Arena México, Mexico City, Mexico. The event was to honor and remember CMLL founder Salvador Lutteroth, who died in March 1987. Starting in 1999 CMLL honored not just their founder during the show, but also a second lucha libre legend, making it their version of a Hall of Fame event. For the 2014 show CMLL commemorated the life and career of wrestler and lucha film star Rayo de Jalisco Sr. This was the 16th March show held under the Homenaje a Dos Leyendas name, having previously been known as Homenaje a Salvador Lutteroth from 1996 to 1998.

The main event was a Lucha de Apuestas hair vs. hair match between longtime rivals Rush and Shocker. Rush won the match, two falls to one, and forced Shocker to have his head shaved completely bald after the match. The show featured a second Lucha de Apuestas match featuring female wrestlers Marcela and Dalys where Dalys lost both the match and her hair. The show also hosted the finals of the 2014 Torneo Nacional de Parejas Increibles tournament Atlantis and Euforia defeated Máximo and Rey Escorpión. The show featured three additional matches.

== Production ==
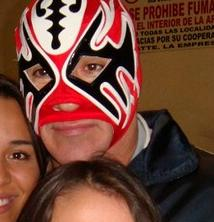
Atlantis, along with Euforia, won the 2014 ''Torneo Nacional de Parejas Increibles

=== Background ===
Since 1996 the Mexican wrestling company Consejo Mundial de Lucha Libre (Spanish for "World Wrestling Council"; CMLL) has held a show in March each year to commemorate the passing of CMLL founder Salvador Lutteroth who died in March 1987. For the first three years the show paid homage to Lutteroth himself, from 1999 through 2004 the show paid homage to Lutteroth and El Santo, Mexico's most famous wrestler ever and from 2005 forward the show has paid homage to Lutteroth and a different leyenda ("Legend") each year, celebrating the career and accomplishments of past CMLL stars. Originally billed as Homenaje a Salvador Lutteroth, it has been held under the Homenaje a Dos Leyendas ("Homage to two legends") since 1999 and is the only show outside of CMLL's Anniversary shows that CMLL has presented every year since its inception. All Homenaje a Dos Leyendas shows have been held in Arena México in Mexico City, Mexico, which is CMLL's main venue, its "home". Traditionally CMLL holds their major events on Friday Nights, which means the Homenaje a Dos Leyendas shows replace their regularly scheduled Super Viernes show. The 2014 show was the 16th overall Homenaje a Dos Leyendas show and the 19th Homenaje show held in March since 1996.

=== Storylines ===
The Homenaje a Dos Leyendas show featured six professional wrestling matches with different wrestlers involved in pre-existing scripted feuds, plots and storylines. Wrestlers were portrayed as either heels (referred to as rudos in Mexico, those that portray the "bad guys") or faces (técnicos in Mexico, the "good guy" characters) as they followed a series of tension-building events, which culminated in a wrestling match or series of matches.

=== Homage to Salvador Lutteroth and Cien Caras ===
In September 1933 Salvador Lutteroth González founded Empresa Mexicana de Lucha Libre (EMLL), which would later be renamed Consejo Mundial de Lucha Libre. Over time Lutteroth would become responsible for building both Arena Coliseo in Mexico City and Arena Mexico, which became known as "The Cathedral of Lucha Libre". Over time EMLL became the oldest wrestling promotion in the world, with 2018 marking the 85th year of its existence. Lutteroth has often been credited with being the "father of Lucha Libre", introducing the concept of masked wrestlers to Mexico as well as the Luchas de Apuestas match. Lutteroth died on September 5, 1987. EMLL, late CMLL, remained under the ownership and control of the Lutteroth family as first Salvador's son Chavo Lutteroth and later his grandson Paco Alonso took over ownership of the company.

The life and achievements of Salvador Lutteroth is always honored at the annual Homenaje a Dos Leyenda' show and since 1999 CMLL has also honored a second person, a Leyenda of lucha libre, in some ways CMLL's version of their Hall of Fame. For the 2014 show CMLL commemorated the life and career of Carmelo Reyes González, generally known under the ring name Cien Caras (Spanish for "One Hundred Faces"). Reyes and his brothers, known as Universo 2000 and Máscara Año 2000 formed Los Hermanos Dinamitas and was a major rudo group throughout the 1990s in both CMLL and AAA. Two of Carmelo Reyes' sons also followed in his footsteps, known as the masked wrestlers, known as El Cuatrero and Sansón. He lost his mask to Rayo de Jalisco Jr. in 1990 in a match where thousands of fans were turned away at the door. During his 34 year career Reyes has won the CMLL World Heavyweight Championship, Mexican National Heavyweight Championship, Mexican National Tag Team Championship twice, with Sangre Chicana and Máscara Año 2000, Mexican National Trios Championship with Máscara Año 2000 and Universo 2000, NWA World Light Heavyweight Championship, WWA World Heavyweight Championship, and IWC World Heavyweight Championship in Mexico,) and the NWA Americas Tag Team Championship with Victor Rivera and the *NWA Texas Tag Team Championship with Jose Lothario in the US.

== Results ==
No.	Results	Stipulations
1	TRT: La Máquina de la Destrucción (Rey Bucanero, El Terrible and Vangelis) defeated Brazo de Plata, Stuka, Jr. and Titán	six-man "Lucha Libre rules" tag team match
2	Ephesto, Mephisto and Negro Casas defeated Blue Panther, La Sombra and Volador Jr.	Six-man "Lucha Libre rules" tag team match
3	Atlantis and Euforia defeated Maximo and Rey Escorpión	Finals of the 2014 Torneo Nacional de Parejas Increibles
4	Marcela defeated Dalys	Best two-out-of-three falls Lucha de Apuestas hair vs. hair match
5	Los Guerreros del Infierno (Gran Guerrero, Niebla Roja and Último Guerrero) defeated Máscara Dorada, Místico and Valiente	Six-man "Lucha Libre rules" tag team match
6	Rush defeated Shocker	Best two-out-of-three falls Lucha de Apuestas hair vs. hair match.
