= CMLL Torneo Nacional de Parejas Increíbles (2013) =

2013 Mexican professional wrestling tournament

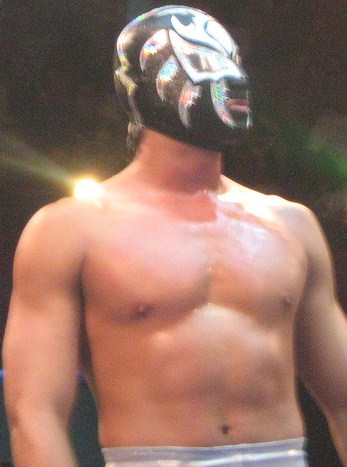
- La Sombra (along with Volador Jr.) won the 2013 tournament
- Promotion: Consejo Mundial de Lucha Libre (CMLL)
- Date: March 1, 2013; March 8, 2013; March 15, 2013
- City: Mexico City, Mexico
- Venue: Arena México

Event chronology
| ← Previous; Reyes del Aire | Next → Torneo Sangre Nueva |

CMLL Torneo Nacional de Parejas Increíbles tournaments chronology
| ← Previous; 2012 | Next → 2014 |

The CMLL Torneo Nacional de Parejas Increíbles 2013 or "National Incredible Pairs Tournament 2013" was the fourth of a series of Lucha Libre (professional wrestling) tournaments for Tag Teams traditionally held early in the year. The tournament was based on the Lucha Libre Parejas Increíbles match type where two wrestlers of opposite allegiance, portraying either villains, referred to as "Rudos" in Lucha Libre wrestling terminology or fan favorites, or "tecnicos". At times some of the team members were part of a pre-existing scripted feuds or storylines with each other. The tournament was won by the team of La Sombra and Volador Jr.

== Tournament ==
Consejo Mundial de Lucha Libre (CMLL) will hold their fourth annual Torneo Nacional De Parejas Increíbles tournament between March 1 and March 15, 2013, starting with two opening round groups where the winner of each group will advance to the finals. The finals will take place at the 2013 Homenaje a Dos Leyendas and be the only tournament match contested under best two-out-of-three falls rules. The tournament will feature teams of wrestlers who do not usually team up, in fact most of the teams are on opposite sides of the Tecnico/Rudo (Fan favorite/villain) divide and were oftentimes direct rivals. As in 2012, the 2013 tournament abandoned the "Regional" approach and combined teams more based on storylines than what region they would represent. Of the 32 participants it was the first Torneo Nacional de Parejas Increíbless tournament for Niebla Roja and Tiger.

=== Tournament Participants ===
Key

| Symbol | Meaning |
|---|---|
| (T) | This wrestler is a Tecnico |
| (R) | This wrestler is a Rudo |

Block A (March 1, 2013)

- Marco Corleone (T) and Kraneo (R)
- Guerrero Maya Jr. (T) and Negro Casas (R)
- El Hijo del Fantasma (T) and El Felino (R)
- Máscara Dorada (T) and Mephisto (R)
- Máximo (T) and Mr. Águila (R)
- La Máscara (T) and Averno (R)
- Shocker (T) and Mr. Niebla (R)
- La Sombra (T) and Volador Jr. (R)

Block B (March 8, 2013)

- Ángel de Oro (T) and Ephesto (R)
- Atlantis (T) and Último Guerrero (R)
- Blue Panther (T) and Rey Escorpión (R)
- Delta (T) and Tiger (R)
- Diamante Azul (T) and Euforia (R)
- Dragón Rojo Jr. (R) and Niebla Roja (R)
- Valiente (T) and Pólvora (R)
- Rush (T) and El Terrible (R)

=== Team rivalries ===
The concept of the Parejas Increíbles tournament oftentimes sees two wrestlers who either have history together or are currently working a storyline feud against each other, which in the 2013 tournament is the case in several instances.

Block A

Some of the teams were simply put together from opposite sides of the tecnico/rudo divide and not because of some past or current storyline. In Block A the team of Marco Corleone was originally scheduled to team up with Olímpico, who did not have any direct storyline between the two, Corleone's team El Bufete del Amor ("The Law of Love") (Corleone, Rush and Maximo) were at the time involved in a series of matches against the Los Invasores group for the CMLL World Trios Championship, but not so much Olímpico as it was against Volador Jr., Mr. Águila and Kraneo. The team was later changed so that Corleone was forced to team up with his rival Kraneo, playing off the running storyline between El Bufete and Los Invasores. The team of Hijo del Fantasma and El Felino as well as the team of Máscara Dorada and Mephisto did not have a particular storyline reason to be teamed up. La Máscara was paired up with Averno, someone he had a long running storyline against, a storyline that included La Máscara unmasked Averno at the 2011 Juicio Final event. Guerrero Maya Jr. and Negro Casas met in a series of trios matches in late 2012 leading up to Guerrero Mayo Jr. wrestling, and losing to, Negro Casas in a match for Casas' NWA World Historic Welterweight Championship, but not much interaction since then. In the weeks and months leading up to the tournament Máximo and Mr. Águila often found themselves on opposite sides in Trios matches, Máximo with the rest of El Bufete del Amor and Mr. Águila with the rest of Los Invasores. The two teams have met on a few occasions with El Bufete's CMLL World Trios Championship on the line, while Los Invasores Mexican National Trios Championship being passed over compared to the more prestigious CMLL title. The team of Shocker Mr. Niebla were no strangers to each other, having actually worked together as a regular tag team in the late 1990s. In 1998 the two defeated Dr. Wagner Jr. and Emilio Charles Jr. to win the CMLL World Tag Team Championship and would subsequently defend the tag team championship against teams such as Blue Panther and Black Warrior, Bestia Salvaje and Scorpio Jr. and the Hermanas Dinamita (Cien Caras and Universo 2000). In October 1998 Mr. Niebla suffered an injury during a match, an injury that was so severe that Mr. Niebla was forced to vacate the Tag Team title. Upon his return Mr. Niebla continued to team with Shocker but the team were not able to win the Tag Team title back. On September 24, 1999, at the CMLL 66th Anniversary Show, the team of Nr. Niebla and Shocker faced Atlantis and Villano III in a Relevos suicida match, a match where the losing team would fight each other for their mask. In the main event match of CMLL's 66th Anniversary show, Atlantis and Villano III defeated the much less experienced team, afterwards Mr. Niebla defeated Shocker to unmask him. In the years since Shocker's unmasking the two have wrestled each other on numerous occasions, both in CMLL and other promotions. In the period leading up to the Parejas Increíbles tournament it was speculated that the two may finally wrestle each other in another match where Shocker's hair and Mr. Niebla's mask is on the line, but such a match had not been made official before the tournament was announced.

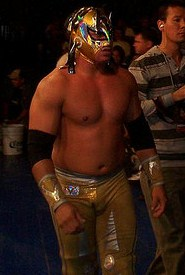
Volador Jr. teamed up with longtime rival La Sombra for the tournament.

La Sombra and Volador Jr. originally worked together as a very successful tag team, including holding the CMLL World Tag Team Championship from January 16, 2009, until July 16, 2010. Up until the end of their run as champions there was no problems between the two, but during the spring of 2010 Volador Jr. began exhibiting more rudo tendencies. During the 2010 "Torneo Nacional de Pareja Increíbles" tournament longtime tecnico Místico clashed with Volador Jr., turning rudo. Over the following months the rivalry between Volador Jr. and Místico also drew in La Sombra as well as El Felino, leading to the 2010 Homenaje a Dos Leyendas show where Místico and El Felino would team up to face Volador Jr. and La Sombra in a match contested under Relevos Suicida rules, with the first two wrestlers eliminated by pinfall, submission, disqualification or count out would have to face each other in a Lucha de Apuesta match with their mask on the line. The match came down to La Sombra and El Felino, with La Sombra taking the victory. In subsequent weeks Místico returned to the tecnico side, while Volador Jr. became a rudo, a turn that was cemented during a match on July 16, 2010, where Volador Jr. turned on La Sombra and cost them the match and the CMLL World Tag Team Championship to the team of Mr. Águila and Héctor Garza on July 23, 2010. Later on Volador Jr. attacked La Sombra and tore his mask off and beat him up. The feud between the two led both wrestlers to be booked in the main event of the CMLL 77th Anniversary Show, a 14-man steel cage Lucha de Apuesta, mask vs. mask match. Volador Jr. was the 10th man to leave the steel cage, keeping his mask safe. The match came down to La Sombra pinning Olímpico to unmask him. Their rivalry extended into 2013 when La Sombra successfully defended the NWA World Historic Welterweight Championship during the second day of the Fantastica Mania 2013 series of events in Japan. The two had faced off again only weeks before their Torneo Nacional de Pareja Increíbles participation when La Sombra defeated Volador Jr. to become the 2013 CMLL Reyes del Aire#CMLL Reyes del Aire 2013 Reyes del Aire.

Block B

Like Block A, Block B saw several teams with a storied past, none more so than the team of Rush and El Terrible. Their past rivalry had started when El Terrible defeated Rush in the finals of a tournament to determine a holder of the CMLL World Heavyweight Championship on January 1, 2012. The two were also paired up for the 2012 Torneo Nacional de Parejas Torneo Nacional de Pareja Increíbles, and in the weeks leading up to the tournament Rush stated that he was willing to set aside his differences with El Terrible as he wanted to win the Parejas Increibles tournament, despite the two having developed a heated rivalry over the last number of months. After getting along and qualifying for the final match Rush and El Terrible's miscommunication and dissension allowed their opponents to win the match and the tournament. Following the match Rush took a microphone and berated both El Terrible and the fans for their actions that night and then followed it up by challenging El Terrible to a Luchas de Apuestas, hair vs. hair match at a later date. El Terrible did not accept the challenge at that point in time. The two faced off in the main event of the CMLL 79th Anniversary Show in a Lucha de Apuestas, hair vs. hair match that was won by Rush. The storyline continued to develop in the months following the anniversary event and included El Terrible successfully defending the CMLL World Heavyweight Championship against Rush on January 22, 2013.

The team of Atlantis and Último Guerrero is the team with one of the longest back stories, going back all the way to 2005. At the time Atlantis was a tecnico, but came to the aid of rudo Último Guerrero during a match to signal his move to the rudo side, joining Los Guerreros del Infierno ("The Warriors from Hell"), actually causing them to change the name of the group to Los Guerreros de la Atlantida (the Warriors of Atlantis). Over the following years Guerrero and Atlantis acted as co-captains of the group, functioning as unit without any signs of problems.

On February 25, 2011, Atlantis and Máscara Dorada defeated Blue Panther and Dragón Rojo Jr. in the finals to win the 2010 Torneo Nacional de Parejas Increíbles for the second year in a row. In June, Atlantis replaced an injured Shocker and teamed with the tecnico team of Delta and Guerrero Maya Jr. in the Forjando un Ídolo tournament, which they eventually went on to win. After weeks of tension between Atlantis and Último Guerrero, CMLL held a press conference on August 11, where Atlantis officially turned technico and left Los Guerreros de la Atlantida. Since the turn Atlantis and Guerrero faced off on opposite sides of trios, tag and singles matches, often with inconclusive results or as a result of underhanded tactics from either side. In the week before their Torneo Parejas Increíbles participation the two faced off in the main event of that week's Super Viernes, a match that saw the storyline between the two once again become the focal point of the match, leading into their Parejas Incredibles match the following week.

While both Dragón Rojo Jr. and Niebla Roja were both rudos and had once both been part of Los Guerreros del Infierno the team was still considered a Pareja Increíbles due to the rudo vs. rudo rivalry that had developed between Los Guerreros del Infierno and Los Revolucionarios del Terror ("The Revolutionaries of Terror"), a group that had split from Los Guerreros in 2012. On April 8, 2011, Último Guerrero teamed up with Rey Escorpión, to win the 2011 CMLL Torneo Gran Alternativa#Gran Alternativa 2011 and subsequently invited Escorpión to join his Los Guerreros del Infierno group. In May, Guerrero became a member of the CMLL booking committee. Through the summer of Rey Escorpión began to develop problems with the rest of Los Guerreros, particularly Último Guerrero and new Guerrero Euforia. The tension let to Escorpión being kicked out of the group, although the confrontations never turned to an actual fight. On August 31, 2012, during CMLL's weekly Super Viernes Show Rey Escorpión teamed with his former Los Guerreros teammates to win a Cuadrangular de Tercias tournament, actually winning the tournament despite not getting along. Two weeks later the team were unsuccessful in their challenge for the CMLL World Trios Championship, which only furthered the issues between Escorpión and Los Guerreros. The tension finally erupted into a physical encounter as Dragón Rojo Jr. turned on Los Guerreros, siding with Rey Escorpión as they beat up Euforia after a match on the October 5th Super Viernes show. Afterwards Escorpión and Dragón Rojo Jr. announced that they were forming their own group, targeting Los Guerreros del Infierno. A few days later it was announced that Pólvora was joining the two to form a trio called Los Revolucionarios del Terror.

While Valiente and Pólvora did not have a long running storyline the two had clashed several times in the weeks before the tournament, culminating in Pólvora successfully defending the CMLL World Welterweight Championship against Valiente on February 3, 2013. Some of the teams were simply paired together, not because of any existing storyline, but because they were Increíbles by being on opposite sides of the tecnico/rudo divide. These teams included Ángel de Oro and Ephesto, Blue Panther and Rey Escorpión, Delta and Tiger and finally Diamante Azul and Euforia.

=== Tournament results ===
First round
La Máscara and Averno | W
El Hijo de Fantasma and El Felino
Guerrero Maya Jr. and Negro Casas
La Sombra and Volador Jr. | W
Máximo and Mr. Águila
Máscara Dorada and Mephisto | W
Shocker and Mr. Niebla | W
Marco Corleone and Kraneo
Dragón Rojo Jr. and Niebla Roja | W
Rush and El Terrible
Delta and Tiger
Blue Panther and Rey Escorpión | W
Atlantis and Último Guerrero | W
Valiente and Pólvora
Ángel de Oro and Ephesto
Diamante Azul and Euforia | W

Second round
La Máscara and Averno
La Sombra and Volador Jr. | W
Mascara Dorada and Mephisto
Shocker and Mr. Niebla | W
Dragón Rojo Jr. and Niebla Roja | W
Blue Panther and Rey Escorpión
Atlantis and Último Guerrero | W
Diamante Azul and Euforia

Semifinals
La Sombra and Volador Jr. | W
Shocker and Mr. Niebla
Dragón Rojo Jr. and Niebla Roja
Atlantis and Último Guerrero; | W

Finals
La Sombra and Volador Jr. | W
Atlantis and Último Guerrero
