= Homenaje a Dos Leyendas (2011) =

Mexican professional wrestling supercard show

- Official poster for the event (note the 2010 typo)
- Promotion: Consejo Mundial de Lucha Libre
- Date: March 18, 2011
- City: Mexico City, Mexico
- Venue: Arena México
- Attendance: 10,500

Pay-per-view chronology
← Previous; Torneo Nacional de Parejas Increíbles	Next → Torneo Gran Alternativa

Homenaje a Dos Leyendas chronology
← Previous; 2010	Next → 2012

Homenaje a Dos Leyendas (2011) (Spanish for "Homage to Two Legends") was a professional wrestling supercard show event, scripted and produced by Consejo Mundial de Lucha Libre (CMLL; "World Wrestling Council"). The Dos Leyendas show took place on March 18, 2011 in CMLL's main venue, Arena México, Mexico City, Mexico. The event was to honor and remember CMLL founder Salvador Lutteroth, who died in March 1987. Starting in 1999 CMLL honored not just their founder during the show, but also a second lucha libre legend, making it their version of a Hall of Fame event. For the 2011 show CMLL commemorated the life and career of wrestler Ángel Blanco, grandfather of then-CMLL wrestler Höruz. This was the 13th March show held under the Homenaje a Dos Leyendas name, having previously been known as Homenaje a Salvador Lutteroth from 1996 to 1998.

The main event of the show was a Tag team Lucha de Apuestas match with both teams risking their hair on the outcome of the match. The match saw the team of El Terrible and El Texano Jr. defeat the father / son team of Brazo de Plata and Máximo. After the match both Brazo de Oro and Máximo were forced to stand in the middle of the ring and have their hair shaved off. In the semi-main event Averno successfully defended the NWA World Historic Middleweight Championship against longtime rival Máscara Dorada.

== Production ==
=== Background ===
Since 1996 the Mexican wrestling company Consejo Mundial de Lucha Libre (Spanish for "World Wrestling Council"; CMLL) has held a show in March each year to commemorate the passing of CMLL founder Salvador Lutteroth who died in March 1987. For the first three years the show paid homage to Lutteroth himself, from 1999 through 2004 the show paid homage to Lutteroth and El Santo, Mexico's most famous wrestler ever and from 2005 forward the show has paid homage to Lutteroth and a different leyenda ("Legend") each year, celebrating the career and accomplishments of past CMLL stars. Originally billed as Homenaje a Salvador Lutteroth, it has been held under the Homenaje a Dos Leyendas ("Homage to two legends") since 1999 and is the only show outside of CMLL's Anniversary shows that CMLL has presented every year since its inception. All Homenaje a Dos Leyendas shows have been held in Arena México in Mexico City, Mexico, which is CMLL's main venue, its "home". Traditionally CMLL holds their major events on Friday Nights, which means the Homenaje a Dos Leyendas shows replace their regularly scheduled Super Viernes show. The 2011 show was the 16th overall Homenaje a Dos Leyendas show.

=== Storylines ===
The Homenaje a Dos Leyendas show featured six professional wrestling matches with different wrestlers involved in pre-existing scripted feuds, plots and storylines. Wrestlers were portrayed as either heels (referred to as rudos in Mexico, those that portray the "bad guys") or faces (técnicos in Mexico, the "good guy" characters) as they followed a series of tension-building events, which culminated in a wrestling match or series of matches.

Consejo Mundial de Lucha Libre (CMLL) held a press conference on February 24, 2011 and announced the first match for the 2011 Homenaje a Dos Leyendas would be a "hair vs. hair" Tag team Lucha de Apuestas, or "Bet match", between Brazo de Plata and Máximo and the team of El Terrible and El Texano Jr.

Averno won the original NWA World Middleweight Championship on November 30, 2007, when he defeated Místico. On August 12, 2010, CMLL replaced the championship with the NWA World Historic Middleweight Championship after they returned the original to the National Wrestling Alliance (NWA) per their request. By virtue of being the last holder of the original championship, CMLL named Averno the first holder of the NWA World Historic Middleweight Championship. Averno made one successfully defense of the championship prior to Homenaje a Dos Leyendas, defeating Charly Manson on a September 12, 2010, show in Mexico City.

=== Homage to Salvador Lutteroth and Ángel Blanco ===
In September 1933 Salvador Lutteroth González founded Empresa Mexicana de Lucha Libre (EMLL), which would later be renamed Consejo Mundial de Lucha Libre. Over time Lutteroth would become responsible for building both Arena Coliseo in Mexico City and Arena Mexico, which became known as "The Cathedral of Lucha Libre". Over time EMLL became the oldest wrestling promotion in the world, with 2018 marking the 85th year of its existence. Lutteroth has often been credited with being the "father of Lucha Libre", introducing the concept of masked wrestlers to Mexico as well as the Luchas de Apuestas match. Lutteroth died on September 5, 1987. EMLL, late CMLL, remained under the ownership and control of the Lutteroth family as first Salvador's son Chavo Lutteroth and later his grandson Paco Alonso took over ownership of the company.

The life and achievements of Salvador Lutteroth is always honored at the annual Homenaje a Dos Leyenda' show and since 1999 CMLL has also honored a second person, a Leyenda of lucha libre, in some ways CMLL's version of their Hall of Fame. For the 2011 show CMLL commemorated the life and career of José Ángel Vargas Sánchez (August 2, 1938 – April 26, 1986), known in lucha libre circules under the ring name Ángel Blanco (Spanish for "White Angel"). Vargas made his debut in 1960 and wrestled until his death in 1986. Vargas was killed in a car accident on the way to a show. Several of Vargas' relatives have worked under the ring names "Ángel Blanco Jr." or "El Hijo de Ángel Blanco". One of Vargas' grandsons, Moisés Neftalí Vargas, has worked under the names Horus and later Rey Salomón Jr. During his wrestling career Vargas was closely linked with Dr. Wagner, with the two forming La Ola Blanca ("The White Wave"), a very successful tag team in the 1960s. On December 8, 1972, he lost his mask to El Solitario. During his career he won the Mexican National Tag Team Championship, and the NWA Americas Tag Team Championship with Dr. Wagner. He also won the Mexican National Cruiserweight Championship, Mexican National Heavyweight Championship, and the NWA World Light Heavyweight Championship in singles competition.

== Aftermath ==
Following his successful title defense against Máscara Dorada at Dos Leyendas, Averno made two successful NWA World Historic Middleweight Championship defenses against La Máscara on July 4 and 27, before losing the championship to La Máscara on November 22.

== Results ==
No.	Results	Stipulations	Times
1	Astral, Electrico and Ultimo Dragoncito defeated Pierrothito, Pequeño Violencia and Pequeño Nitro	Best two-out-of-three falls six-man tag team match	16:06
2	Diamante, Metro and Stuka Jr. defeated Okumura and Los Cancerberos del Infierno (Raziel and Euforia) via disqualification	Best two-out-of-three falls six-man tag team match	09:07
3	Los Guerreros del Atlantida (Atlantis, Dragon Rojo Jr. and Último Guerrero) defeated Ángel de Oro, Blue Panther and Valiente	Best two out of three falls six-man tag team match	10:31
4	La Peste Negra (El Felino, Mr. Niebla and Negro Casas) defeated La Sombra, Rush and Toscano	Best two out of three falls six-man tag team match	16:06
5	Averno (c) defeated Máscara Dorada	Best two out of three falls match for the NWA World Historic Middleweight Championship	20:06
6	El Terrible and El Texano Jr. defeated Brazo de Plata and Máximo	Best two-out-of-three falls tag team Lucha de Apuestas hair vs. hair match.	17:50
(c) / – the champion(s) heading into the match
