= CMLL Torneo Nacional de Parejas Increíbles (2011) =

2011 Consejo Mundial de Lucha Libre tournament

CMLL Torneo Nacional De Parejas Increíbles (2011)
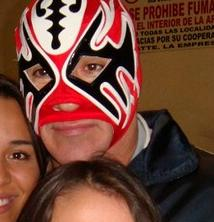
- Atlantis, one half of the tournament winners.
- Promotion: Consejo Mundial de Lucha Libre (CMLL)
- Date: February 11, 2011; February 18, 2011; February 25, 2011
- City: Mexico City, Mexico
- Venue: Arena México

Event chronology
← Previous; Pequeños Reyes del Aire	Next → Homenaje a Dos Leyendas

CMLL Torneo Nacional de Parejas Increíbles tournaments chronology
← Previous; 2010	Next → 2012

The CMLL Torneo Nacional de Parejas Increíbles 2011 or "National Incredible Pairs Tournament 2011" was the second annual Lucha Libre (professional wrestling) tournament for Tag Teams, traditionally held early in the year. The tournament is based on the Lucha Libre Parejas Increíbles match type where two wrestlers of opposite allegiance, portraying either villains, referred to as "Rudos" in Lucha Libre wrestling terminology or fan favorites, or "Technicos". At times the team members will be part of a pre-existing scripted feuds or storylines with each other. Each year there has been at least one exception to the "Tecnico teams with a Rudo" rule, but the majority of the teams has been actual Parejas Increíbles. in 2010 and 2011 each team represented the region where they were raised or where they learned to wrestle which also excluded any non-Mexican competitors from the tournament. The teams represented the four most important regions of Lucha Libre in Mexico Mexico, Guadalajara, Jalisco, the La Laguna Region and Monterrey, Nuevo León. The team of Máscara Dorada and Atlantis won the tournament for the second year in a row.

== Tournament ==
Consejo Mundial de Lucha Libre (CMLL) held the second annual Torneo Nacional De Parejas Increíbles tournament in January 2011. The tournament featured teams of wrestlers who do not usually team up, in fact most of the teams are on opposite sides of the Tecnico/Rudo (Fan favorite/villain) divide and were oftentimes direct rivals. The participating teams would all represent the region where they were raised or where they learned to wrestle. The 16 teams represented Mexico, Guadalajara, Jalisco, the La Laguna Region and Monterrey, Nuevo León in the tournament. The tournament was a standard single-elimination Tag Team, split into two brackets of eight teams, the two matches for the two brackets took place on the February 11, 2011 and February 18, 2011 CMLL Super Viernes shows and the final match was held on the February 25, 2011 Super Viernes.

=== Tournament participants ===
Key

Symbol	Meaning
(T)	This wrestler is a Tecnico
(R)	This wrestler is a Rudo

Mexico City

- Brazo de Plata (T) and Olímpico (R)
- El Hijo del Fantasma (T) and Mephisto (R)
- La Mascara (T) and El Felino (R)
- Maximo (T) and Negro Casas (R)
- Metro (T) and Rey Bucanero (R)
- Sangre Azteca (T) and El Alebrije (R)
- Valiente (T) and Psicosis (R)

Guadalajara

- Máscara Dorada (T) and Atlantis (R)
- Rush (T) and Mr. Águila (R)

La Laguna

- Ángel de Oro (T) and Último Guerrero (R)
- Blue Panther (T) and Dragón Rojo Jr. (R)
- Stuka Jr. (T) and Ephesto (R)
- La Sombra (T) and Misterioso Jr. (R)

Nuevo León

- Delta (T) and Héctor Garza (R)
- Diamante (T) and Volador Jr. (R)
- Toscano (T) and El Terrible (R)

=== Block A ===
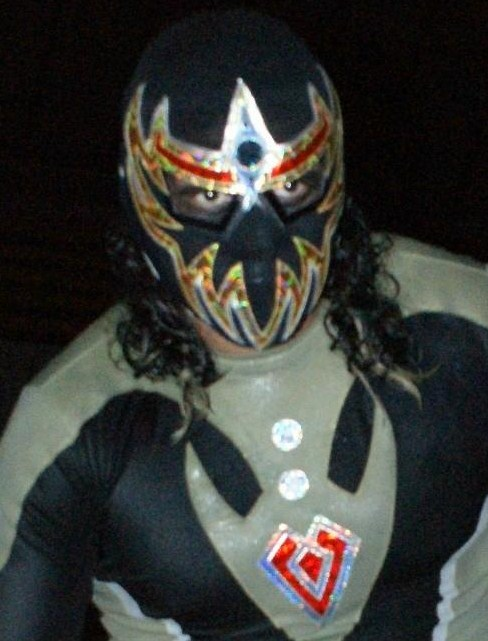
Máscara Dorada: One half of the tournament winners.

To determine the team match-ups in the tournament a representative of each team entered a Battle royal where the order of elimination determined when the team would wrestle in the first round – the first two wrestlers eliminated would face off, then the next two and the next two, with the final two men in the ring facing off in the last of the opening round matches. The first Battle Royal, on February 11, included Ángel de Oro. Delta, Dragón Rojo Jr., Metro, Olímpico, Rush, Sangre Azteca and El Terrible. The match ended with Delta and Dragón Rojo Jr. as the last two wrestlers in the ring, which meant their teams would meet in the final first round match that evening. Due to the order of elimination the team of Rush and Mr. Águila faced off against Brazo de Plata and Olímpico in the first match of the actual tournament, a match Rush and Mr. Águila wins in around 4 minutes. Further first round matches saw Metro and Rey Bucanero defeat Sangre Azteca and El Alebrije, Ángel de Oro and Último Guerrero defeat the team of Toscano and El Terrible and finally Battle Royal survivor Dragón Rojo Jr. teamed up with Blue Panther to defeat Delta and Héctor Garza to advance in the tournament. The second round of Block A had Metro and Bucanero defeat Rush and Mr. Águila and Blue Panther and Dragón Rojo Jr. eliminated Ángel de Oro and Último Guerrero to earn a spot in the semifinal match. Blue Panther and Dragón Rojo Jr. continued their winning ways in the semifinal as they defeated Metro and Rey Bucanero to earn their way to the final match that would be a best two-out-of-three falls match that would take place on February 25, 2011.

=== Block B ===
Block B saw the return of the 2010 Tournament winners Máscara Dorada and Atlantis, who was the only team to reunite from the 2010 tournament. The second block matches took place on February 18 and again started with a battle royal to determine the order of matches. The Battle Royal included ended with Maximo and Máscara Dorada being the last two men in the ring.

In the first match of the actual tournament La Sombra and Misterioso Jr. overcame the team of El Hijo del Fantasma and Mephisto, as they were unable to get along as a team. Diamante and Volador Jr. defeated Stuka Jr. and Ephesto, Valiente and Psicosis II overcame La Mascara and El Felino and finally the returning champions, Máscara Dorada and Atlantis, defeated Maximo and Negro Casas to continue their success. In the second round Diamante and Volador Jr. defeated La Sombra and Misterioso Jr. as Volador Jr. pinned his former CMLL World Tag Team Championship partner. In the other match Atlanta and Dorada defeated El Felino and La Mascara as the two let the long running tension between their respective families influence their teamwork. In the semifinal Atlantis and Dorada proved why they were the last year's winners as they worked as a well organized team in victory over Volador Jr. and Diamante.

=== Finals ===
The finals took place on Friday February 25, 2011 and featured what was described as "teacher against teacher (Atlantis and Blue Panther), Young against Youth (Dorada and Rojo), Warrior against Warrior" (Both Atlantis and Rojo were members of Los Guerreros del Infierno or "The Infernal Warriors"). At the end of the first fall Máscara Dorada forced Dragón Rojo Jr. to the floor, then leap over the top rope onto Rojo Jr.. executing a difficult, high risk move. While the two young wrestlers were on the floor Atlantis pinned Blue Panther to take the first fall of the match for his team. In the second fall Dragón Rojo Jr. kicks Dorada out of the ring and is then almost pinned by Atlantis, but Panther saved his Rudo partner, putting aside their issues for the good of the tournament. The second fall comes to an end as Blue Panther forces Atlantis to submit. The first two falls came quickly, while the third fall was prolonged, seeing both teams have the advantage at different times during the match. At one point Máscara Dorada uses the tension of the top rope to propel him over fifteen feet over the floor as he flips onto Dragón Rojo Jr. on the floor, flawlessly executing a move known as an Asai Moonsault. The deciding fall comes when Atlantis forces Blue Panther to submit simultaneously with Dorada forcing Rojo Jr. to submit as well to win the tournament for the second time in a row.

=== Tournament Brackets ===
First round
Rush and Mr. Águila	W
Brazo de Plata and Olímpico
Sangre Azteca and El Alebrije
Metro and Rey Bucanero	W
Toscano and El Terrible
Ángel de Oro and Último Guerrero	W
Delta and Héctor Garza
Blue Panther and Dragón Rojo Jr.	W
La Sombra and Misterioso Jr.	W
El Hijo del Fantasma and Mephisto
Diamante and Volador Jr.	W
Stuka Jr. and Ephesto
Valiente and Psicosis
La Mascara and El Felino	W
Máscara Dorada and Atlantis	W
Maximo and Negro Casas

Second round
Rush and Mr. Águila
Metro and Rey Bucanero	W
Ángel de Oro and Último Guerrero
Blue Panther and Dragón Rojo Jr.	W
La Sombra and Misterioso Jr.
Diamante and Volador Jr.	W
La Mascara and El Felino
Máscara Dorada and Atlantis	W

Semifinals
Metro and Rey Bucanero
Blue Panther and Dragón Rojo Jr.	W
Diamante and Volador Jr.
Máscara Dorada and Atlantis	W

Finals
Blue Panther and Dragón Rojo Jr.
Máscara Dorada and Atlantis	W

=== Aftermath ===
The repeat winners Máscara Dorada and Atlantis did not actually team up again after the tournament was over, nor did they have any storyline between them as a fall out of the tournament. In August 2011 Atlantis turned Tecnico and as a result the team was not able to team up for a third time in 2012. None of the other Parejas Increibles pairings extended into a longer-running storyline between the two partners.
