= Rey Escorpión =

Mexican professional wrestler (born 1979)

Personal information
- Born: Fabián Núñez Napoles; January 20, 1979 (age 47) Guaymas, Sonora, Mexico

Professional wrestling career
- Ring name(s): Escorpión Negro; Escorpión Negro Jr. Escorpión/Scorpión; Rey Escorpión
- Billed height: 1.75 m (5 ft 9 in)
- Billed weight: 95 kg (209 lb)
- Trained by: El Satánico; Fobia; Mocho Cota; Rambo; Rey Misterio, Sr.
- Debut: March 20, 1999

Fabián Núñez Napoles (born January 20, 1979) is a Mexican professional wrestler, better known by the ring name Rey Escorpión. He is currently working for Lucha Libre AAA Worldwide (AAA), where he portrays a rudo ("bad guy") character. He is a former AAA World Tag Team Champion with Texano Jr., and a former third of the AAA World Trios Champions with La Hiedra and Texano Jr. He worked for Consejo Mundial de Lucha Libre (CMLL) from 2009 to 2016 and prior to that worked for Lucha Libre AAA Worldwide (AAA) in 2008, where he was known as Escorpión Negro. Núñez ring name is Spanish for "Scorpion King".

While working for CMLL Núñez won the CMLL World Light Heavyweight Championship as well as winning the annual Torneo Gran Alternativa tournament twice, with Último Guerrero and Boby Zavala respectively. He was a member of Los Guerreros del Infierno group from 2011 to 2012, but in late 2012 he left that group to form his own faction called Los Revolucionarios del Terror ("The Revolutionaries of Terror") alongside Dragón Rojo Jr. and Pólvora.

== Professional wrestling career ==
Núñez trained for his professional wrestling career under Mocho Cota before his professional debut in 1999, and later received further training from El Satánico and Fobia as he was trying to establish himself on the Mexican independent circuit. Early in his career, Núñez worked under the ring name Escorpión Negro or Escorpión Negro Jr. (despite not being the son of a wrestler called Escorpión Negro). In 2006, he began a storyline feud against Hombre Sin Miedo ("The Man Without Fear") that would span several months. On June 10, 2006, Escorpión Negro lost a Lucha de Apuestas, or "bet match", to Hombre Sin Miedo and thus was forced to remove his mask and reveal his birth name. Three months later, he gained a small measure of revenge by defeating Hombre Sin Miedo to win the AAA Northern Middleweight Championship. He held it for just over a month before Hombre Sin Miedo regained the championship.

=== Lucha Libre AAA Worldwide (2008–2009) ===
Escorpión began working intermittently for Lucha Libre AAA Worldwide (AAA) starting around 2000, working primarily on smaller shows when AAA toured northern Mexico. During this period, he held the AAA Northern Middleweight Championship. In 2008 then-members of the AAA group Los Guapos ("The Handsome Ones") Scorpio Jr. and Zumbido left the AAA promotion to join International Wrestling Revolution Group (IWRG) instead. Following their departure, Escorpión Negro was introduced as a new member of Los Guapos VIP, joining El Brazo and Decnis to complete the team. Escorpión Negro and the rest of Los Guapos VIP teamed with Pirata Morgan in a loss to the team of El Alebrije, Brazo de Plata, El Elegido, and Pimpinela Escarlata on the undercard of the 2008 Verano de Escándalo show.

=== Consejo Mundial de Lucha Libre (2009–2016) ===
After leaving AAA, Núñez began working for Consejo Mundial de Lucha Libre (CMLL), the other major wrestling promotion in Mexico. In CMLL, he worked as either Escorpión or Scorpión and primarily appeared in the opening match of shows. On January 1, 2011, Escorpión participated in that year's version of Reyes del Aire ("Kings of the Air") but was eliminated as the third man from the Torneo cibernetico elimination match when Rey Cometa pinned him. Following the tournament, Escorpión started a storyline rivalry with Loco Max. The storyline between the two wrestlers kept building until March 14, where the two faced off in a Luchas de Apuestas ("Bet Match") where the loser of the match would be shaved bald. Escorpión lost the match to Loco Max and had his hair shaved off after the match to comply with the stipulation. A few weeks later, Escorpión entered the 2011 Torneo Gran Alternativa tournament, a tag team tournament that teams a rookie with an experienced wrestler. Escorpión was teamed up with Último Guerrero, who had won the Gran Alternativa tournament twice before. The duo defeated the teams of Magnus and Brazo de Plata, Mortiz and El Terrible, and Diamante and La Sombra to earn a spot in the final match. On April 8, 2011, Escorpión and Guerrero defeated Máscara Dorada and Metal Blanco to win the Gran Alternativa tournament.

Shortly after his Gran Alternativa victory, Escorpión changed his name to Rey Escorpión ("Scorpion King") and joined Último Guerrero's Los Guerreros del Infierno group along with Dragón Rojo Jr. He then entered the Forjando Un Idolo ("Forging an idol"), a tournament to help identify a young, rising CMLL luchador. The tournament featured four qualifying blocks where the top two point earners would move on to the "Playoffs" round. Rey Escorpión placed second in "Group Bravo", with victories over Rey Cometa and Palacio Negro to earn six points. He lost in the first match of the "Playoff" round to Delta on May 13, 2011. Following the completion of the Forjando un Idolo, CMLL booked all the group finalists in a Trios tournament where the two top would team up with their "Mentor". Rey Escorpión teamed up with tournament winner Ángel de Oro and Último Guerrero, but did not make it to the finals of the tournament. In September 2011, Rey Escorpión competed in that year's version of the Leyenda de Plata tournament, but did not make it past the qualifying Torneo cibernetico match held as part of the CMLL 79th Anniversary Show, as he was eliminated by Olímpico.

Rey Escorpión began 2012 with another tournament appearance, participating in the 2012 Reyes del Aire tournament; he was the third-to-last man eliminated when he was pinned by Máscara Dorada. Following the tournament, Rey Escorpión started a feud with Black Warrior, which grew in intensity over the following months. He participated in the 2012 Torneo Nacional De Parejas Increibles, a tag team tournament where a rudo and a tecnico ("good guy") are forced to team up. The tournament saw Rey Escorpión team up with rival Black Warrior, furthering the storyline between the two as their inability to get along caused them to be eliminated by Marco Corleone and Último Guerrero. The storyline with Black Warrior reached its conclusion on June 1, 2012, when Rey Escorpión defeated his opponent in a Luchas de Apuestas match, forcing Black Warrior to have his hair shaved off after the match.

Following the conclusion of the storyline with Black Warrior, Rey Escorpión began to develop problems with the rest of Los Guerreros, particularly Último Guerrero and new Guerrero Euforia. The tension let to Escorpión being kicked out of the group, although the confrontations never turned to an actual fight. On August 31, 2012, during CMLL's weekly Super Viernes show Rey Escorpión teamed with his former Los Guerreros team mates to win a Cuadrangular de Tercias tournament, actually winning the tournament despite not getting along. Two weeks later, the team were unsuccessful in their challenge for the CMLL World Trios Championship, which only furthered the issues between Escorpión and Los Guerreros. The tension finally erupted into a physical encounter as Dragón Rojo Jr. turned on Los Guerreros, siding with Rey Escorpión as they attacked Euforia after a match on the October 5th Super Viernes show. Afterward, Escorpión and Dragón Rojo Jr. announced that they were forming their own group, targeting Los Guerreros del Infierno. The team of Rey Escorpión, Dragón Rojo Jr., and Pólvora was unveiled as Los Revolucionarios del Terror ("The Revolutionaries of Terror").

On January 22, 2013, Escorpión survived a torneo cibernetico to advance to a final match for the vacant CMLL World Light Heavyweight Championship against the other survivor, Volador Jr. On January 29, Escorpión defeated Volador Jr. to become the new CMLL World Light Heavyweight Champion. Rey Escorpión was forced to team up with the tecnico Blue Panther to partake in the Torneo Nacional de Parejas Increibles tournament in March 2013. The two defeated Delta and Tiger in the first round, but lost to the team of Dragón Rojo Jr. and Niebla Roja in the quarter-finals. After having won the 2011 Gran Alternativa as a rookie, Rey Escorpión participated in the 2013 Gran Alternativa tournament as the experienced wrestler, teaming with rookie Boby Zavala. The two competed in qualifying Block B that took place on the April 19 Super Viernes show. The team defeated Leono and Blue Panther in the first round, Espanto Jr. and Mr. Niebla in the second round, and defeated Soberano Jr. and La Sombra in the semi-finals to earn the last spot in the finals of the tournament the following week at the Arena Mexico 57th Anniversary Show. For the finals Zavala was made an honorary member of Los Revolucionarios, and the two defeated Hombre Bala Jr. and Atlantis to win the tournament.

In July 2014, Dragón Rojo Jr. quit Los Revolucionarios del Terror, but returned to the stable on May 8, 2015. On October 28, Escorpión lost the CMLL World Light Heavyweight Championship to Ángel de Oro. On July 17, Escorpión was defeated by Último Guerrero in a Lucha de Apuestas in the main event of Sin Salida, having all his hair shaved off a result. On June 27, Rey Escorpión turned on Los Revolucionarios del Terror and joined Los Ingobernables. However, by October, Rey Escorpión had left CMLL and Los Ingobernables.

=== New Japan Pro-Wrestling (2013–2014) ===
In January 2013, Escorpión made his Japanese debut, when he took part in the three-day Fantastica Mania 2013 event, co-promoted by CMLL and New Japan Pro-Wrestling in Tokyo. During the first night on January 18, he teamed with Tomohiro Ishii and Yujiro Takahashi to defeat Bushi, Diamante, and Ryusuke Taguchi in a six-man tag team match, pinning Diamante for the win. The following night, Escorpión, Kazuchika Okada, and Volador Jr. defeated Hiroshi Tanahashi, La Máscara, and Rush in another six-man tag team match, with Escorpión once again scoring the pinfall win for his team, this time over Rush. During the third and final night, Escorpión was defeated by Rush in a singles match.

In January 2014, Escorpión returned to Japan to take part in the five-day Fantastica Mania 2014 tour. During the third event of the tour, on January 17, Escorpión successfully defended the CMLL World Light Heavyweight Championship against Máximo.

=== Lucha Libre Elite (2016–2017) ===
In 2016, CMLL began working together with Lucha Libre Elite, a promotion that held shows in Arena Mexico and used a lot of CMLL-contracted wrestlers combined with wrestlers from International Wrestling Revolution Group (IWRG). As part of the collaboration, LLE launched the "Liga Elite" tournament, where Rey Escorpión was added when several US-based wrestlers were unable to compete for LLE. In the fall of 2016, CMLL stopped working with LLE, withdrawing most of its wrestlers from the LLE shows. As part of the split, Rey Escorpión stopped working for CMLL, and mainly focused on LLE where he was one of the top rudo wrestlers. On November 18, he lost the finals of the Liga Elite to Caristico.

=== Lucha Libre AAA Worldwide (2017–present) ===
After 8 years of absence, Rey Escorpión made his return to AAA during Triplemanía XXV where he attacked El Mesías and Pagano. Later he started a storyline feud with Psycho Clown. On November 19, Rey Escorpión got an opportunity for the AAA Latin American Championship against El Hijo del Fantasma, but Psycho Clown cost him the victory as part of their escalating storyline. At the 2018 Rey de Reyes event he won the Rey de Reyes tournament. On March 25, Rey Escorpión and El Texano Jr., defeated Dark Cuervo and Dark Escoria, to win the AAA World Tag Team Championship, his first AAA title.

=== Pro Wrestling Noah (2023) ===
Escorpión made his Pro Wrestling Noah debut at Majestic on May 4, 2023, losing to Dralístico. He made his next and final appearance on July 15, as he, Dante Leon and HAYATA lost to Dralístico, AMAKUSA and Ninja Mack.

== Personal life ==
Núñez is the father of a son who suffers from Legg–Calvé–Perthes disease and has had to undergo a number of surgeries to correct the problems. CMLL and Núñez have held at least one fundraising event to help pay for the expenses.

== Championships and accomplishments ==
- Consejo Mundial de Lucha Libre
  - CMLL World Light Heavyweight Championship (1 time)
  - Gran Alternativa (2011, 2013) – with Último Guerrero and Boby Zavala
- Lucha Libre AAA Worldwide
  - AAA Northern Middleweight Championship (1 time)
  - AAA World Trios Championship (1 time) – with La Hiedra, Taurus and Texano Jr.
  - AAA World Tag Team Championship (1 time) - with El Texano Jr.
  - Rey de Reyes (2018)
- Kaoz Lucha Libre
  - Kaoz Heavyweight Championship (1 time)
- Pro Wrestling Illustrated
  - PWI ranked him #97 of the top 500 singles wrestlers in the PWI 500 in 2014

== Luchas de Apuestas record ==
Winner (wager)	Loser (wager)	Location	Event	Date	Notes
Escorpión Negro (mask)	Monje Negro Jr. (hair)	Monterrey, Nuevo León	Live event	October 28, 2001	
Hombre Sin Miedo (mask)	Escorpión Negro (mask)	Nuevo Laredo, Tamaulipas	Live event	June 10, 2006	
Escorpión Negro (hair)	Babe Rap (hair)	Monclova, Coahuila	Live event	2008	
Loco Max (hair)	Escorpión (hair)	Puebla, Puebla	CMLL show	March 14, 2011	
Escorpión (hair)	Black Warrior (hair)	Mexico City	CMLL show	June 1, 2012	
Rey Escorpión (hair)	Criss Boy (hair)	Emiliano Zapata, Morelos	Live event	April 20, 2013	
Rey Escorpión (hair)	Brazo de Plata (hair)	Mexico City	Super Viernes	August 18, 2013	
Último Guerrero (hair)	Rey Escorpión (hair)	Mexico City	Sin Salida	July 17, 2015	
Psycho Clown (mask)	Rey Escorpión (hair)	Mexico City	Triplemanía XXIX	August 14, 2021	
