= CMLL Torneo Nacional de Parejas Increíbles (2010) =

2010 Consejo Mundial de Lucha Libre tournament

CMLL Torneo Nacional De Parejas Increíbles (2010)
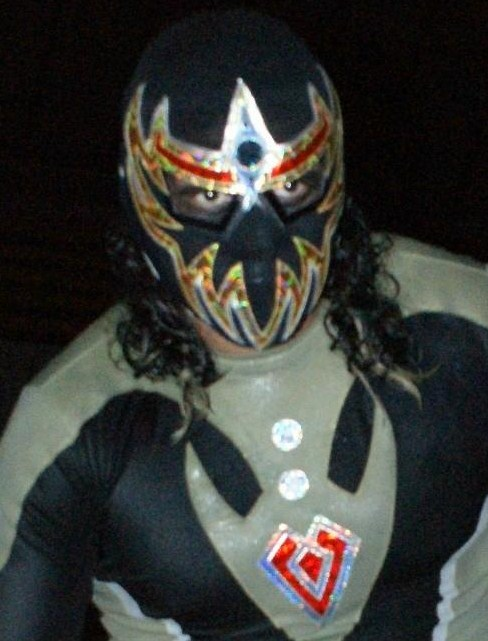
- Máscara Dorada: One half of the tournament winners
- Promotion: Consejo Mundial de Lucha Libre (CMLL)
- Date: January 30, 2010; January 6, 2010; January 13, 2010
- City: Mexico City, Mexico
- Venue: Arena México

Event chronology
← Previous; Sin Salida	Next → Pequeños Reyes del Aire

CMLL Torneo Nacional de Parejas Increíbles tournaments chronology
← Previous; First	Next → 2011

The CMLL Torneo Nacional De Parejas Increíbles 2010 or "National Incredible Pairs Tournament 2010" was the first of a series of Lucha Libre (professional wrestling) tournaments for Tag Teams traditionally held early in the year. The tournament was based on the Lucha Libre Parejas Increíbles match type where two wrestlers of opposite allegiance, portraying either villains, referred to as "Rudos" in Lucha Libre wrestling terminology or fan favorites, or "Technicos". At times some of the team members were part of a pre-existing scripted feuds or storylines with each other. There were some exceptions to the "Tecnico teams with a Rudo" rule, but the majority of the teams has been actual Parejas Increíbles. In this tournament each team represented the region where they were born or where they learned to wrestle which also excluded any non-Mexican competitors from the tournament. The teams represented the four most important regions of Lucha Libre in Mexico Mexico, Guadalajara, Jalisco, the La Laguna Region and Monterrey, Nuevo León. The team of Máscara Dorada and Atlantis won the 2010 tournament.

== Tournament ==
Consejo Mundial de Lucha Libre (CMLL) introduced their annual Torneo Nacional De Parejas Increíbles tournament in January 2010. The tournament would feature teams of wrestlers who do not usually team up, in fact most of the teams are on opposite sides of the Tecnico/Rudo (Fan favorite/villain) divide and were often direct rivals. The participating teams would all represent the region where they were raised or where they learned to wrestle. The 16 teams represented Mexico, Guadalajara, Jalisco, the La Laguna Region and Monterrey, Nuevo León in the tournament. The tournament was a standard single-elimination Tag Team, split into two brackets of eight teams, the two matches for the two brackets took place on the January 22, 2010 Super Viernes and the January 29, 2010 Super Viernes and the final match was held on the February 5, 2010 Super Viernes as the semi-main event of the show.

=== Tournament participants ===
Three of the teams in the 2010 tournament were not actually Increíbles as Rudos El Felino and Sangre Azteca teamed up, Rudos Ephesto and Euforia were paired as well as tecnicos El Sagrado and Shocker and Héctor Garza and Toscano, done to fit the "Regional" approach. The following teams were part of the 2010 Torneo Nacional De Parejas Increíbles, listed by the city/area they represented:

Key

Symbol	Meaning
(T)	This wrestler is a Tecnico
(R)	This wrestler is a Rudo

Mexico City

- Brazo de Plata (T) and Ray Mendoza Jr. (R)
- El Felino (R) and Sangre Azteca (R)
- El Hijo del Fantasma (T) and Mephisto (R)
- La Mascara (T) and Negro Casas (R)
- Maximo (T) and Mr. Niebla (R)
- Místico (T) and Averno (R)
- Valiente (T) and Rey Bucanero (R)

Guadalajara

- Máscara Dorada (T) and Atlantis (R)
- Rouge (T) and El Texano Jr. (R)
- El Sagrado (T) and Shocker (R)

La Laguna

- Blue Panther (T) and Misterioso Jr. (R)
- Ephesto (R) and Euforia (R)
- La Sombra (T) and Dragón Rojo Jr. (R)

Monterrey, Nuevo León

- Héctor Garza (T) and Toscano (T)
- Stuka Jr. (T) and Último Guerrero (R)
- Volador Jr. (T) and El Terrible (R)

=== Block A ===
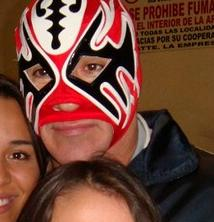
Atlantis one half of the tournament winners.

To determine the team match-ups in the tournament a representative of each team entered a Battle royal where the order of elimination determined when the team would wrestle in the first round – the first two wrestlers eliminated would face off, then the next two and the next two, with the final two men in the ring facing off in the last of the opening round matches.

The first Battle Royal, on January 22, included El Terrible, El Hijo del Fantasma, Averno, Dragón Rojo Jr., Euforia, Máscara Dorada, Máximo and Misterioso II. The match ended with El Terrible and El Hijo del Fantasma as the last two wrestlers in the ring, which meant their teams would meet in the final first round match that evening. After the match order was determined the actual tournament began. The first match saw Atlantis and Máscara Dorada defeat Dragón Rojo Jr. and La Sombra. While Atlantis is a Rudo the team got along without any problems, Atlantis wore his old Tecnico style white mask and wrestled a more tecnico style to complement Máscara Dorada. The second match saw Máximo and Mr. Niebla form a team that quickly earned the nickname La Peste con Amour ("the Love Plague") born from Mr. Niebla being part of La Peste Negra ("the Black Plague") and Máximo's Exótico ring character. The team won when Máximo kissed Blue Panther or Misterioso II, distracting him long enough for Mr. Niebla to sneak up behind him to roll him up for the pinfall. The third first round match paired longtime rivals Místico, CMLL's top Tecnico up with Averno, one of CMLL's top Rudos together to face Euforia and Averno's regular partner Ephesto. Místico and Averno came out with a surprising show of unity as they both wore masks that melded their own masks with their partner's mask, the arch-enemies got along in the match, handily winning it. The last match saw El Terrible and Volador Jr. defeat Hijo del Fantasma and Mephisto to earn their way to the quarter-finals.

Atlantis and Máscara Dorada defeated La Pestre con Amour when Máximo tried to kiss Atlantis to distract him, but ended up kissing Mr. Niebla instead, distracting Mr. Niebla so he lost to a quick roll-up and pinfall. The most talked about storyline of the evening took place in the second quarter final match as Místico and Averno took on Volador Jr. and El Terrible. Up until that night Místico and Volador Jr. (Along with La Sombra had formed a trio called "Super Sky Team", but on the night of January 22 that partnership ended in a surprising fashion. During the match Místico wrestled a much more aggressive, Rudo style especially when in the ring with Volador Jr. Mistico would tear up Volador's mask and win by cheating. Following the match Místico kept attacking Volador Jr. The semi-final match once again saw Místico continue his newly found Rudo ways, tearing at Máscara Dorada's mask and wrestling a more brutal style than he usually wrestled. In the end Atlantis forced Averno to submit to win a place in the finals of the match. Initially it was thought that Místico's rudo tactics were just because he was teamed up with Averno, leaving his true allegiance up in the air at that moment.

=== Block B ===
The second block matches took place on January 29 and again started with a battle royal to determine the order of matches. The match included El Sagrado, Ray Mendoza Jr., Stuka Jr.La Máscara, Rush, Sangre Azteca, Toscano and Valiente with Ray Mendoza Jr. and Stuka Jr. being the last two men in the ring. In the first round El Sagrado and Shocker defeated Rey Bucanero and Valiente, taking full advantage of the fact that they were able to get along without problems. Negro Casas and La Mascara defeated El Texano Jr. and Rush despite the two being involved in a long going rivalry between the Casas family and the Alvarado wrestling family (La Mascara is the son of Jesús Alvarado Nieves better known under the ring name Brazo de Oro). Héctor Garza and Toscano defeated El Felino and Sangre Azteca. In the final first round match Último Guerrero and Stuka Jr. defeated Ray Mendoza Jr. and Brazo de Plata as Mendoza and Brazo de Plata were unable to put their animosity aside for the night. The longest first round match went 05:11 while the shortest match was 03:52. In the second round La Mascara and Negro Casas defeated Shocker and El Sagrado while Garza and Toscano defeated the bracket favorites Último Guerrero and Stuka Jr. While Toscano and Garza were both Tecnicos (fan favorites) and had teamed before it was the Rudo (villain)/tecnico team of Negro Casas and La Mascara who worked best together and won the semi-final match, earning the right to face Atlantis and Máscara Dorada the following week for the Parejas Increibles Nacional tournament trophy.

=== Finals ===
La Máscara and Negro Casas were clearly the crowd favorites in the finals of the Pareja Increíbles Nacional tournament as they were on their "home turf" in Mexico City. La Máscara and Casas faced Atlantis and Máscara Dorada, representing Guadalajara, Jalisco. Unlike the preliminary rounds matches that were only one fall matches the finals featured the traditional Mexican best two out of three falls. La Máscara and Casas won the first fall when Casas pinned Atlantis after 08:07. Atlantis forced Negro Casas to submit and Máscara Dorada forced La Máscara to submit to claim the second fall after 3 minutes and 32 seconds of wrestling. The final fall went 12:30, taking the entire match to the 24:09 mark and saw Atlantis force Negro Casas to submit, followed by La Máscara being counted out as he was outside the ring for more than 20 seconds giving Atlantis and Máscara Dorada the victory and the trophy for the Parejas Increíbles Nacional tournament. The tournament was deemed a success by several magazines and websites as it managed to change up the status quo of CMLL.

=== Tournament brackets ===
First round
Máscara Dorada and Atlantis	W
La Sombra and Dragón Rojo Jr.
Blue Panther and Misterioso Jr.
Máximo and Mr. Niebla	W
Místico and Averno	W
Ephesto and Euforia
El Hijo del Fantasma and Mephisto
El Terrible and Volador Jr.	W
El Sagrado and Shocker	W
Valiente and Rey Bucanero	W
El Texano Jr. and Rouge
La Máscara and Negro Casas	W
El Felino and Sangre Azteca
Héctor Garza and Toscano	W
Stuka Jr. and Último Guerrero	W
Brazo de Plata and Ray Mendoza Jr.

Second round
Máscara Dorada and Atlantis	W
Máximo and Mr. Niebla
Místico and Averno	W
El Terrible and Volador Jr.
El Sagrado and Shocker
La Máscara and Negro Casas	W
Héctor Garza and Toscano
Stuka Jr. and Último Guerrero	W

Semifinals
Máscara Dorada and Atlantis	W
Místico and Averno
La Máscara and Negro Casas	w
Stuka Jr. and Último Guerrero

Finals
Máscara Dorada and Atlantis	W
La Máscara and Negro Casas

=== Aftermath ===
The tournament winners Atlantis and Máscara Dorada did not team up after the tournament ended until they were reunited for the 2011 Torneo Nacional De Parejas Increíbles, which they would also win. The only team in the tournament that would actually continue to team up was La Peste Con Amour as Maximo and Mr. Niebla would team up throughout February and March, teasing both Maximo turning Rudo and Mr. Niebla turning Tecnico. The two would team up until mid to late March 2010 when Mr. Niebla suffered a knee injury and the storyline was dropped.

The biggest storyline to come from the tournament was the apparent Rudo turn of CMLL's top Tecnico Místico, a turn that was cemented during the February 5, 2010 Super Viernes where he faced Volador Jr. in a brutal match that saw Místico work a full-fledged Rudo style. In the second fall Místico pulled his mask off and threw it to Volador Jr. in an attempt to get Volador Jr. disqualified. The end came when Volador Jr. reversed Místico's La Mística and won by applying the same move to Místico. Following the match Místico angrily proclaimed “¡Yo soy la máxima figura de la lucha libre!”. ("I am the greatest figure in wrestling"). On February 12, 2010 Místico lost the Mexican National Light Heavyweight Championship to Volador Jr. losing two falls to one. In April, 2010 Místico announced that he was done being a Rúdo and returned to the Técnico side, although Volador Jr. kept suspicious of Místico. The storyline between the two cooled off for a bit, but in late May, 2010 tension resumed as Místico and Volador Jr. faced off once again over the Mexican Light Heavyweight Championship, with Volador Jr. retaining the belt. At the 2010 Sin Salida the two were on opposite sides of a Relevos Increibles, Místico teamed with Máscara Dorad and Mr. Águila while Volador Jr. teamed with Averno and Negro Casas. Averno came to the ring wearing the same combined Averno/Místico mask he had worn for the Parejas Increibles tournament and tried to convince Místico to join the rúdo side, only to turn around and reveal that both he and Volador Jr. were wearing a combined Averno/Volador Jr. mask underneath. Volador Jr. worked as a rúdo throughout the match, losing the match for his team when he tried to cheat but was caught by the referee. The storyline between Místico and Volador Jr. would continue to build, but remained unresolved when Místico left CMLL to join World Wrestling Federation as "Sin Cara".
