= CMLL Torneo Nacional de Parejas Increíbles =

Consejo Mundial de Lucha Libre tournament

Torneo Nacional de Parejas Increíbles
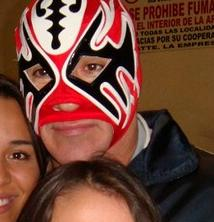
- Atlantis has won the tournament four times, with three different partners.

Details
- Promotion: Consejo Mundial de Lucha Libre
- Date established: January 30, 2010
- Current champions: Atlantis and Euforia
- Date won: March 21, 2014
Statistics
- First champions: Atlantis and Máscara Dorada
- Most reigns: Team: Atlantis and Máscara Dorada (2); Individual: Atlantis (4)
- Longest reign: N/A
- Shortest reign: N/A
- Oldest champion: Atlantis (50 years)

The CMLL Torneo Nacional de Parejas Increíbles or "National Incredible Pairs Tournament" is an annual Lucha Libre (professional wrestling) tournament for Tag Teams traditionally held early in the year. The tournament is based on the Lucha Libre Parejas Increíbles match type where two wrestlers of opposite allegiance, portraying either heels (villains), referred to as "Rudos" in Lucha Libre wrestling terminology or faces (fan favorites), or "Tecnicos" team together.

== Torneo Nacional de Parejas Increíbles Tournament winners ==
Key

Symbol	Meaning
(T)	This wrestler is a Face, or Técnico.
(R)	This wrestler is a Heel, or Rudo.

Year	Winners	Dates	Note
2010	Máscara Dorada (T) and Atlantis (R)	January 22, 2010 – February 5, 2010	
2011	Máscara Dorada (T) (2) and Atlantis (R) (2)	February 11, 2011 – February 25, 2011	
2012	Atlantis (T) (3) and Mr. Niebla (R)	February 17, 2012 – March 2, 2012	
2013	La Sombra (T) and Volador Jr. (R)	March 1, 2013 – March 15, 2013	
2014	Atlantis (T) (4) and Euforia (R)	March 7, 2014 – March 21, 2014	
2015	Máximo (T) and El Terrible (R)	February 20, 2015 – March 6, 2015	
2016	Místico (T) and Mephisto(R)	April 15, 2016 – April 29, 2016	
2017	Bárbaro Cavernario(R) and Volador Jr. (T) (2)	February 10, 2017 – February 24, 2017	
2018	El Terrible (R) (2) and Rush (R)	February 9, 2018 – February 23, 2018	
2019	Titán (T) and Bárbaro Cavernario (R) (2)	April 12, 2019 – April 26, 2019	
2020	Carístico (T) and Forastero (R)	February 14, 2020 – February 28, 2020	
2021	Templario(R) and Volador Jr. (T) (3)	June 11, 2021 – June 25, 2021	
2022	Stuka Jr.(R) and Atlantis Jr. (T)	February 25, 2022	
2023	Averno(R) and Místico (T) (2)	February 10, 2023 – February 17, 2023	
2024	Rocky Romero(R) and Mascara Dorada (T)	March 15, 2024 – March 29, 2024	

== Tournament history ==
CMLL has held ten tournaments so far since in 2010 with each consisting of 16 teams competing in a single elimination tournament with 8 teams competing in the first three rounds of the tournament in one night and the final match held a week after Block B has wrestled. The teams are announced ahead of time but the match order and the pairing of teams for the tournament is determined by a Battle royal with a competitor from each team that determines the match order, i.e. the first two wrestlers eliminated will have to face off in the first match of the first round and so on. The "Seeding Battle Royal" is common practice for a number of CMLL Tag Team tournaments but not generally used much outside of CMLL. Each finalist team will have to wrestle and win three times in one night to qualify for the finale. In 2010 and 2011 the tournament final was held on CMLL's weekly Super Viernes, but in 2012 the finale was held during the 2012 Homenaje a Dos Leyendas Super show instead as it replaced Super Viernes. The 2013 Torneo Nacional de Parejas Increíbles started on Friday March 1 and ran until March 15, 2013, with the final taking place on the 2013 Homenaje a Dos Leyendas. The 2014 Torneo has been announced as starting on February 20 and if it stays with the traditional format will hold the finals on March 6, 2015.

Over the course of the five tournaments so far 57 individual wrestlers have competed in the 70 matches and only four individuals have won the tournament, Atlantis has been on the winning team for four of the five tournaments and a finalist in the fifth, first with Máscara Dorada twice and then with Mr. Niebla and Euforia. Dorada is the only other repeat champion and the team of Máscara Dorada and Atlantis and the teams of El Hijo del Fantasma and Mephisto and Averno and La Mascara are the only team to appear in more than one tournament, both competed in the 2010 and 2011 tournaments. El Felino, Maximo, Mephisto, La Sombra. El Terrible, Último Guerrero and Valiente are the only wrestlers to work all six tournaments. Eight wrestlers have competed in five tournaments, 14 have appeared in four, seven wrestlers in three, five wrestlers in two and finally 15 wrestlers have only participated in one tournament so far. Of the 52 people 4 has appeared both as a Tecnico and a Rudo, Atlantis was a Rudo for 2010 and 2011 but a Tecnico in 2012 and 2013, Volador Jr. was a Tecnico in 2010 and a Rudo since then, Héctor Garza has one appearance on either side of the face/heel divide as does Sangre Azteca. Two competitors have appeared in different tournaments under different ring personas, first Kraneo who worked as "El Alebrije" in 2011 and Kraneo in 2012 and secondly Diamante Azul, who participated in the 2011 tournament under his previous ring identity of "Metro" and in the 2013 under his current ring character Diamante Azul. Rush worked under the name "Rouge" in 2010 and Rush in 2011 and since then, this does not signify two different ring personas, just a slight name change. (Note: The statistics are supported by the source for each show.)

At times the team members will be part of a pre-existing scripted feuds or storylines with each other. Each year there has been at least one exception to the "Tecnico teams with a Rudo" rule, but the majority of the teams has been actual Parejas Increíbles. In 2010 and 2011 each team represented the region where they were raised or where they learned to wrestle which also excluded any non-Mexican competitors from the tournament. The teams represented the four most important regions of Lucha Libre in Mexico Mexico, Guadalajara, Jalisco, the La Laguna Region and Monterrey, Nuevo León. In 2012 the Regional aspect was dropped and a non-Mexican competitor, Marco Corleone, participated.
