= Gran Metalik =

Mexican professional wrestler

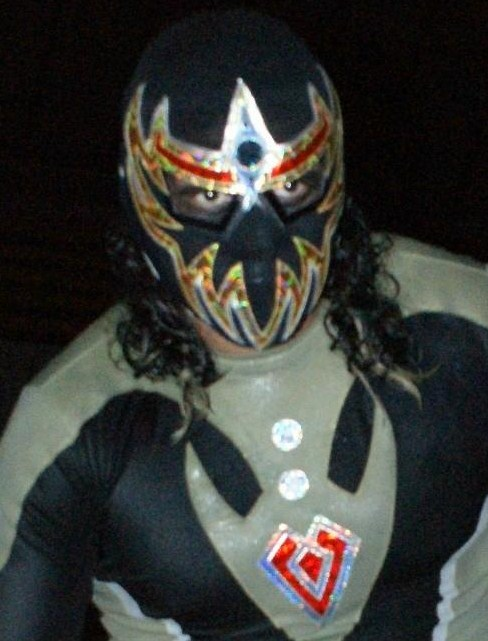
- Metalik in 2010

Personal information
- Born: August 24, 1988 (age 38) Guadalajara, Jalisco, Mexico
- Children: 3

Professional wrestling career
- Ring name(s): Gran Metalik; Máscara Dorada (I); Metalik; Plata II
- Billed height: 5 ft 9 in (1.75 m)
- Billed weight: 175 lb (79 kg)
- Billed from: Guadalajara, Jalisco, Mexico
- Trained by: Gran Cochisse; El Satánico
- Debut: July 14, 2005

Metalik (born August 24, 1988) is a Mexican professional wrestler who performs on the independent circuit. He is best known for his time in WWE from 2016 to 2021 under the ring name Gran Metalik, and in Consejo Mundial de Lucha Libre (CMLL) from 2008 to 2016 under the ring name Máscara Dorada. His real name has not been officially documented, as is often the case with masked wrestlers in Mexico, where their private lives are concealed from the fans.

He made his debut in 2005, originally under the masked persona Plata II, before using the ring name Metalik. In 2008, he adopted the "Máscara Dorada" character, modeled after Mini-Estrella Mascarita Dorada, the first instance of a regular-sized wrestler being given a character based on a mini. At one point, Dorada was a quadruple CMLL champion, holding the Mexican National Trios Championship, CMLL World Trios Championship, CMLL World Super Lightweight Championship and CMLL World Welterweight Championship at the same time. He is a four-time CMLL World Welterweight Champion and won the Torneo Nacional de Parejas Increíbles with Atlantis back-to-back in 2010 and 2011. After a decade of working for CMLL in his native Mexico, he worked full-time for the Japanese promotion New Japan Pro-Wrestling (NJPW) from January 2015 until returning to CMLL a year later in February 2016.

In the summer of 2016, he competed in the American promotion WWE's Cruiserweight Classic tournament, after which he signed with WWE and was assigned to their brand 205 Live. He was then paired with masked wrestlers Kalisto and Lince Dorado as Lucha House Party; they were promoted to the Raw brand in November 2018, before moving to the SmackDown brand in October 2019. He is a one-time WWE 24/7 Champion. After requesting his release and departing WWE in November 2021, he began working on the independent circuit. He subsequently returned to NJPW and CMLL, also making appearances for Impact Wrestling, All Elite Wrestling (AEW) and Ring of Honor (ROH).

== Professional wrestling career ==
=== Consejo Mundial de Lucha Libre (2005–2016) ===
==== Early years (2005–2008) ====
After training with Gran Cochisse and El Satánico, he made his professional wrestling debut on July 14, 2005. He initially used the ring persona Plata II, a copy of the original Plata that wrestled in the 1990s, before being repackaged as Metalik, a variation of the "metal-based" look he had used as Plata II. He worked mainly for Consejo Mundial de Lucha Libre (CMLL)'s Guadalajara branch throughout 2008, winning the Occidente Welterweight Championship and the hair of Jeque in a Lucha de Apuestas. Metalik and Metálico entered a tournament for the vacant CMLL Arena Coliseo Tag Team Championship on June 15, defeating Los Hombres del Camuflaje (Artillero and Súper Comando) in the first round, but lost to Los Nuevos Infernales (Euforia and Nosferatu) in the quarter-finals. On July 18, he was paired with Dos Caras Jr. in the Torneo Gran Alternativa ("Great Alternative Tournament"), where a newcomer teams with a veteran, making it to the finals in a loss to Dragón Rojo Jr. and Último Guerrero.

==== Máscara Dorada (2008–2016) ====
In late 2008, CMLL announced the creation of a "large" version of mini wrestler Mascarita Dorada, Máscara Dorada ("Golden Mask"). Minis were often traditionally patterned after existing wrestlers, but this mini was created prior to the "regular-sized" wrestler. Metalik redebuted as Dorada on November 7, teaming with La Máscara and La Sombra to defeat Jauria del Terror (Averno, Ephesto and Mephisto). On April 7, 2009, he outlasted nine other wrestlers in a torneo cibernetico to win the vacant CMLL World Super Lightweight Championship. For holding a title, Dorada entered the inaugural Universal Championship tournament on June 5, losing to Black Warrior in the first round. He made his first successful title defense against Virus on August 9. At the CMLL 76th Anniversary Show on September 18, he, El Hijo del Fantasma and El Sagrado defeated Poder Mexica (Dragón Rojo Jr., Misterioso Jr. and Sangre Azteca). On December 1, he unsuccessfully challenged Negro Casas for the CMLL World Welterweight Championship.

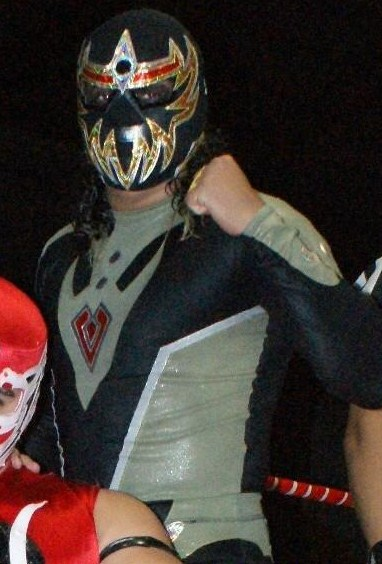
Dorada in December 2010

On January 6, 2010, Dorada, Metro and Stuka Jr. defeated Poder Mexica in a tournament final for the vacant Mexican National Trios Championship, becoming a double champion. He and rudo Atlantis won the Torneo Nacional de Parejas Increibles ("National Incredible Pairs Tournament") that ran from January 22 to February 5, defeating Dragón Rojo Jr. and La Sombra, Máximo and Mr. Niebla, Averno and Místico and finally Casas and La Máscara. He, El Hijo del Fantasma and Valiente lost to El Terrible, Mephisto and Texano Jr. at Homenaje a Dos Leyendas ("Homage to Two Legends") on March 19. On April 12, Dorada retained his title against Dragón Rojo Jr. After winning a non-title match, Dorada, La Máscara and La Sombra (later known as La Generación Dorada) defeated La Ola Amarilla (Hiroshi Tanahashi, Okumura and Taichi) for the CMLL World Trios Championship on May 21, becoming a triple champion. In the Universal Championship tournament on July 30, he defeated Stuka Jr. in the first round before losing to Guerrero in the quarter-finals. At the CMLL 77th Anniversary Show on September 3, he, Blue Panther and La Máscara defeated Poder Mexica. Four days later, Dorada defeated Casas for the CMLL World Welterweight Championship, becoming the first quadruple champion in CMLL history. On September 13, he received the opportunity to hold five championships, but failed to win the CMLL World Tag Team Championship from Los Invasores (Héctor Garza and Mr. Águila) alongside Místico. On November 18, Dorada relinquished his part of the Mexican National Trios Championship, which his partners continued to hold with Delta.

Dorada and Atlantis won their second consecutive Torneo Nacional de Parejas Increibles on February 25, 2011, lastly defeating Blue Panther and Dragón Rojo Jr. At Homenaje a Dos Leyendas on March 18, Dorada failed to win Averno's NWA World Historic Middleweight Championship after interference from Mephisto. He then paired with Metal Blanco for the Torneo Gran Alternativa, defeating Mephisto and Tiger Kid in the first round, Dragon Lee and Volador Jr. in the quarter-finals and Averno and Palacio Negro in the semi-finals. On April 7, Dorada vacated the CMLL World Super Lightweight Championship, moving to the middleweight division. He and Blanco lost to Guerrero and Escorpión in the finals the next day. On July 15, La Generación Dorada lost the CMLL World Trios Championship to Los Hijos del Averno. On August 15, he successfully defended the CMLL World Welterweight Championship against Mephisto. Dorada was eliminated by Tanahashi in the first round of the Universal Championship tournament on September 9 and Jushin Thunder Liger in the semi-final torneo cibernetico of the Leyenda de Plata ("The Silver Legend") tournament at the CMLL 78th Anniversary Show on September 30. He again retained the title over Mephisto on November 4. Later that month, he and Shocker unsuccessfully challenged Dragón Rojo Jr. and Guerrero for the CMLL World Tag Team Championship. For the 2012 Torneo Nacional de Parejas Increíbles on February 17, Dorada and Volador Jr. defeated Euforia and Guerrero Maya Jr. in the first round before losing to La Sombra and Mr. Águila in the quarter-finals. On May 22, he successfully defended his title against Psicosis. He competed in that year's Universal Championship tournament on August 17, defeating Black Warrior in the first round, but lost to El Terrible in the quarter-finals. On November 11, Dorada lost the CMLL World Welterweight Championship to Pólvora.

In May 2013, Dorada formed the stable Los Estetas del Aire ("The Air Esthetes") with Místico and Valiente. At Sin Salida ("No Escape") on June 3, Dorada defeated Casas to win his first NWA World Historic Welterweight Championship. On June 16, they defeated Los Guerreros Laguneros (Euforia, Niebla Roja and Último Guerrero) in a tournament final for the CMLL World Trios Championship. Two days later, Dorada retained his title against Averno. On August 23, he lost to La Máscara in the first round of that year's Universal Championship tournament. At the CMLL 80th Anniversary Show on September 13, Los Estetas del Aire successfully defended their title against Dragón Rojo Jr., Escorpión and Pólvora. Dorada lost his title to Volador Jr. on November 19. At Homenaje a Dos Leyendas on March 21, 2014, Los Estetas del Aire lost a non-title match to Los Guerreros Laguneros, who defeated them for the championship seven days later. At the CMLL 81st Anniversary Show on September 19, he, Valiente and Volador Jr. defeated Euforia, Mr. Niebla and Thunder by disqualification. On December 26, Dorada and Casas outlasted Azteca, Delta, Fuego, Kamaitachi, Pólvora, Rey Cometa, Titán and Tritón to advance to the finals of a tournament for the vacant CMLL World Welterweight Championship, which Dorada won for a third time the following week.

Dorada left CMLL in January 2015 by signing a one-year contract with Japanese partner promotion New Japan Pro-Wrestling (NJPW), before returning on February 1, 2016. Later that month, he retained the title against Mephisto. At Homenaje a Dos Leyendas on March 18, Dorada, Dragon Lee, Místico and Valiente defeated Fujin, Kamaitaichi, Okumura and Raijin. He made another successful title defense against Bárbaro Cavernario on March 28. During the next night's Torneo Gran Alternativa, Dorada and Pegasso defeated El Terrible and Sansón in the first round before losing to Mephisto and Yago in the quarter-finals. He and Bobby Z participated in the Torneo Nacional de Parejas Increíbles on April 15, defeating El Felino and Super Crazy in the first round, but lost to Mr. Niebla and Volador Jr. in the quarter-finals. On May 3, Dorada's fourth reign as CMLL World Welterweight Champion ended in a loss to Mephisto. At the CMLL 83rd Anniversary Show on September 2, he, Atlantis and Carístico defeated La Peste Negra (Casas, Cavernario and El Felino). On November 1, he, Diamante Azul and Místico unsuccessfully challenged Los Hijos del Infierno for the Mexican National Trios Championship. On November 11, Dorada wrestled his last match for CMLL, teaming with Atlantis and Azul to defeat La Peste Negra.

=== New Japan Pro-Wrestling (2010–2016) ===
On May 8, 2010, Dorada made his NJPW debut as he and Valiente lost to Apollo 55 (Prince Devitt and Ryusuke Taguchi) in the first round of the Super J Tag Tournament. In November, he and La Sombra took part in the Super J Tag League, winning two out of their four matches in the group stage and finishing third in their block, missing the finals. They defeated Héctor Garza and Jushin Thunder Liger at Wrestle Kingdom V in Tokyo Dome on January 4, 2011. Dorada lost the CMLL World Welterweight Championship to Taguchi on January 22 during the NJPW and CMLL co-promoted Fantastica Mania 2011 tour. He returned in April as a rudo, primarily teaming with members of Chaos. At Wrestling Dontaku 2011 on May 3, he unsuccessfully challenged Liger for the CMLL World Middleweight Championship. Later that month, Dorada entered the 2011 Best of the Super Juniors tournament, winning four out of his eight matches in the round-robin stage, finishing sixth out of the nine wrestlers in his block. At Dominion 6.18 on June 18, Dorada regained the CMLL World Welterweight Championship from Taguchi. Three days later, Dorada, Hiroshi Tanahashi and KUSHIDA defeated Brian Kendrick, Gedo and Jado in the first round of the J Sports Crown Openweight 6 Man Tag Tournament, but lost to Bad Intentions (Giant Bernard and Karl Anderson) and Liger in the second round the next day.

Dorada returned to NJPW at Wrestle Kingdom VI on January 4, 2012, teaming with Liger, KUSHIDA and Tiger Mask to defeat Atlantis, Taichi, Taka Michinoku and Valiente. During the Fantastica Mania 2012 tour later that month, he successfully defended the CMLL World Welterweight Championship against KUSHIDA. He also participated in the Fantastica Mania 2013 tour in January 2013. Dorada returned for another tour opposite Bullet Club from September 23 to the Destruction pay-per-view on September 29, where he pinned fellow CMLL worker and Bullet Club member Rey Bucanero in an eight-man tag team match. On January 19, 2014, Dorada unsuccessfully challenged Volador Jr. for the NWA World Historic Welterweight Championship in the main event of the Fantastica Mania 2014 tour's final show. From April to July, Dorada worked an extended tour with NJPW that included a two-day tour of Taiwan, the Wrestling Dontaku 2014 tour, the 2014 Best of the Super Juniors, where he missed the semi-finals with a record of three wins and four losses, and the Kizuna Road 2014 tour. On October 25, he and Bushi lost to reDRagon (Bobby Fish and Kyle O'Reilly) in the first round of the 2014 Super Jr. Tag Tournament. Dorada remained with NJPW until November 8, with he and Bushi defeating Fuego and Tiger Mask in the dark match of Power Struggle.

In January 2015, during the Fantastica Mania 2015 tour, Dorada and Atlantis won the Fantastica Mania 2015 Tag Tournament. On the tour's final event, it was revealed that Dorada signed a one-year contract with NJPW. After suggesting the unification of his CMLL World Welterweight Championship and the IWGP Junior Heavyweight Championship, Dorada challenged reigning champion Kenny Omega on February 11 at The New Beginning in Osaka. At The New Beginning in Sendai three days later, Dorada and Time Splitters (Alex Shelley and KUSHIDA) defeated Omega, whom he pinned, and The Young Bucks. However, Dorada failed to win Omega's title at Invasion Attack 2015 on April 5. At Wrestling Dontaku 2015 on May 3, he, Liger, Tiger Mask and Yuji Nagata defeated Captain New Japan, KUSHIDA, Manabu Nakanishi and Taguchi. Dorada then entered the 2015 Best of the Super Juniors, where he finished third in his block with a record of five wins and two losses. At Destruction in Okayama on September 23, he and Liger lost to reDRagon. Dorada lost the CMLL World Welterweight Championship to Bushi on December 19, but regained it during the Fantastica Mania 2016 tour on January 22, 2016. Dorada's final match under his NJPW contract took place two days later.

=== WWE (2016–2021) ===
==== Cruiserweight division (2016–2018) ====
On June 13, 2016, WWE announced Dorada, under the ring name Gran Metalik, as a participant in the upcoming Cruiserweight Classic tournament. He subsequently credited Finn Bálor (formerly Prince Devitt in NJPW) as being the reason he was invited to the tournament and revealed that he was only working the Cruiserweight Classic matches with WWE, still working full-time with CMLL beyond that. In the midst of the tournament, on July 15, it was reported that Metalik had signed a full-time contract with WWE. He defeated Alejandro Saez in the first round, Tajiri in the second round, and Akira Tozawa in the quarter-finals. On September 14, the last day of the tournament, Metalik defeated Zack Sabre Jr. to advance to the finals, where he lost to T.J. Perkins. He then began working on the Raw brand's cruiserweight division. On the September 19 episode of Raw, Metalik made his main roster debut in a loss to The Brian Kendrick in a fatal four-way match to determine the number one contender for the WWE Cruiserweight Championship at Clash of Champions, also involving Cedric Alexander and Rich Swann. On the February 14, 2017 episode of 205 Live, Metalik made his debut on the brand, defeating Drew Gulak. In September, Metalik competed in a number one contender's five-way elimination match for the title, but was the second person eliminated by Alexander.

==== Lucha House Party (2018–2021) ====
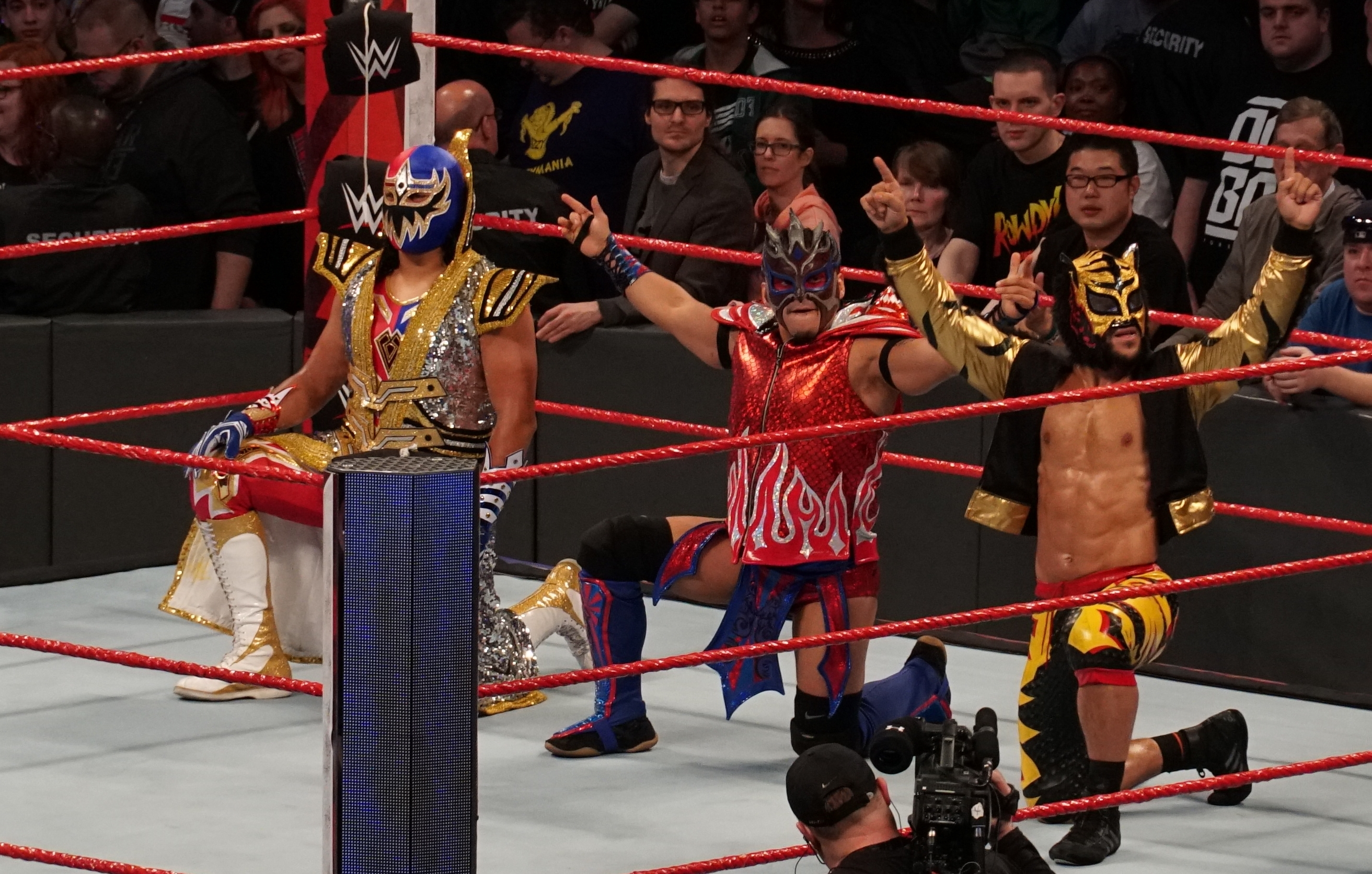
Lucha House Party – Metalik (left), Kalisto (middle), and Lince Dorado (right) in April 2018

In early 2018, Metalik formed a regular team with 205 Live's fellow masked luchadors Kalisto and Lince Dorado, later dubbed the Lucha House Party. They carried brightly colored noisemakers and vuvuzela horns to use for celebrating after a victory, as well as a brightly colored Piñata donkey, referred to as "Penelope". At Royal Rumble on January 28, they defeated Gulak, Gentleman Jack Gallagher and TJP. Two days later, Metalik lost to Alexander in the opening round of a tournament for the vacant WWE Cruiserweight Championship. At Survivor Series on November 18, Lucha House Party was part of Team Raw in a five on five team elimination match, which was won by Team SmackDown.

Following the event, Lucha House Party entered a storyline with The Revival (Dash Wilder and Scott Dawson), who objected to Lucha House Party being allowed to compete as a tag team when there was three of them. In subsequent weeks, they defeated The Revival in various three-on-two or three-on-one matches, billed as "Lucha House Rules" matches. On the February 4, 2019 episode of Raw, The Revival defeated Lucha House Party as part of a fatal four-way match to earn a future match for the WWE Raw Tag Team Championship. At Money in the Bank on May 19, Lucha House Party appeared for an unadvertised match, only to be attacked by Lars Sullivan, who defeated them in a three-on-one handicap match via disqualification on June 7 at Super ShowDown, and in a three-on-one handicap elimination match three days later on Raw.

As part of the 2019 WWE Draft, Lucha House Party was drafted to the SmackDown brand. At Crown Jewel on October 31, they participated in the World Cup Tag Team Turmoil match to determine "the best tag team in the world", but were the first team eliminated by Dolph Ziggler and Robert Roode. On November 24, they failed to win a tag team battle royal at the Survivor Series kickoff show. At Elimination Chamber on March 8, 2020, Lucha House Party were one of six teams in a tag team Elimination Chamber match for the SmackDown Tag Team Championship, but were eliminated by Heavy Machinery (Otis and Tucker). Metalik and Dorado failed to win the titles from The New Day (Big E and Kofi Kingston) in a fatal four-way match also involving The Forgotten Sons (Steve Cutler and Wesley Blake) and The Miz and John Morrison on May 10 at Money in the Bank. On the July 24 episode of SmackDown, Metalik won a fatal four-way match for an Intercontinental Championship match against AJ Styles, but failed to win the title the following week.

In October, Metalik and Dorado were drafted to the Raw brand in the 2020 Draft, splitting them from Kalisto, who remained on the SmackDown brand. On the December 30 episode of NXT, Metalik and Dorado made a surprise appearance, confronting NXT Cruiserweight Champion Santos Escobar before defeating Legado del Fantasma (Joaquin Wilde and Raul Mendoza). At NXT: New Year's Evil on January 6, 2021, Metalik unsuccessfully challenged Escobar for the title due to their interference. On January 20, he and Dorado entered the 2021 Dusty Rhodes Tag Team Classic, defeating Imperium (Fabian Aichner and Marcel Barthel) in the first round. On the February 1 episode of Raw, they failed to win the Raw Tag Team Championship from The Hurt Business (Alexander and Shelton Benjamin). Two days later, Metalik and Dorado lost to Legado del Fantasma in the tournament quarterfinals. On September 22, it was reported that Metalik requested for his release from the company due to a "lack of opportunities". On November 4, Metalik was officially released from WWE.

=== Independent circuit (2022–present) ===
After his WWE release, Game Changer Wrestling (GCW) announced that Metalik, as Máscara Dorada, would make appearances for them throughout February 2022. He wrestled his first post-WWE match on February 4, losing to Blake Christian in a four-way match also involving ASF and Gringo Loco. On April 16, 2023, Metalik defeated Rey Horus to win the Mucha Lucha Atlanta (MLA) Global Championship. At The Crash Lucha Libre's 12th anniversary show on November 3, he lost to Andrade El Idolo in a three-way match also involving Galeno del Mal.

=== Return to NJPW (2022–2023) ===
On February 17, 2022, Dorada made his return to NJPW after a six-year absence. In his return match, he defeated TJP on March 20 during a taping of Strong Style Evolved. At Lonestar Shootout on April 1, Dorada, Clark Connors, Karl Fredericks and Yuya Uemura defeated FinJuice (David Finlay and Juice Robinson), Daniel Garcia and Kevin Knight. At The Night Before Rumble on 44th Street on October 27, he lost to Mike Bailey in a four-way match also involving Mantequilla and Smiley. On the January 7, 2023 episode of Strong, Dorada competed in a Strong Survivor match to determine the number one contender for the Strong Openweight Championship, but was the seventh wrestler eliminated by Wheeler Yuta in the battle royal portion of the match. Dorada made his final NJPW appearance on February 18, teaming with Josh Alexander, Adrian Quest and Rocky Romero in a loss to Kushida, Knight, The DKC and Volador Jr. at Battle in the Valley.

=== Impact Wrestling (2022) ===
Dorada made his Impact Wrestling debut on the September 1 episode of Impact! (taped August 26), where he defeated Alex Zayne. On the September 15 episode, he unsuccessfully challenged Bailey for the Impact X Division Championship.

=== All Elite Wrestling / Ring of Honor (2022–2024) ===
On September 14, 2022, Dorada made his debut for All Elite Wrestling (AEW) on Dark: Elevation, defeating Serpentico. He debuted for their sister promotion Ring of Honor (ROH) in a loss to Jeff Cobb on the Final Battle pre-show on December 10.

In early 2023, Dorada reverted to using the Metalik ring name. At Supercard of Honor on March 31, Metalik, AR Fox and Blake Christian unsuccessfully challenged The Embassy (Bishop Kaun, Brian Cage and Toa Liona) for the ROH World Six-Man Tag Team Championship. On the April 13 episode of Ring of Honor Wrestling, he failed to win the ROH World Championship from Claudio Castagnoli. The trio challenged House of Black (Brody King, Buddy Matthews and Malakai Black) for the AEW World Trios Championship on the May 24 episode of Dynamite, but were defeated. Metalik also failed to win the NJPW World Television Championship from Zack Sabre Jr. on the August 31 episode of Ring of Honor Wrestling. His last AEW/ROH appearance was on the July 4, 2024 episode, where he and Komander lost to Undisputed Kingdom (Matt Taven and Mike Bennett) in a ROH World Tag Team Championship Proving Ground match.

=== Return to CMLL (2023) ===
On June 14, 2023, it was announced that Metalik would return to CMLL on July 14 at Atlantis' 40th Anniversary Show, where he teamed with Máscara Dorada 2.0 and Titán to defeat Bárbaro Cavernario, Templario and Virus. On July 21, Metalik participated in the semi-final torneo cibernetico of the Leyenda de Plata, where he eliminated Titán before being the last wrestler eliminated by Romero. Metalik continued to appear for CMLL, but failed to reach a deal with the promotion and lost to Titán in his final date on July 28.

== Professional wrestling style ==
As Metalik or Máscara Dorada, he generally portrays a face, the professional wrestling term for the protagonists of the storylines. He is known for performing a high-risk, high-flying version of lucha libre, exemplified by his frequent use of dives out of the wrestling ring, including the Brillo Metalik, a somersault suicide senton where he leaps through the top rope and flips onto an opponent on the floor. During his time in Mexico, he used a variation of the dive known as the Brillo Dorada, where he would springboard off the second rope and jump over the top onto an opponent on the floor. His finishing move is a Samoan driver (referred to as the Metalik Driver in WWE and previously the Dorada Screwdriver), where he lifts an opponent up on his shoulders before slamming them down to the ground.

== Other media ==
As Gran Metalik, he made his video game debut as a playable character in WWE 2K18. He has since appeared in WWE SuperCard, WWE 2K19, WWE 2K20, WWE 2K Battlegrounds, and WWE 2K22.

== Personal life ==
He was born on August 24, 1988, in Guadalajara, Jalisco. During a 2016 interview with Lucha World, he revealed that he was the father of two young girls. His immediate family still resides in Guadalajara. He has relatives living in Los Angeles, while Dorada himself lived in Mexico City. He welcomed his third daughter on November 4, 2018.

== Championships and accomplishments ==
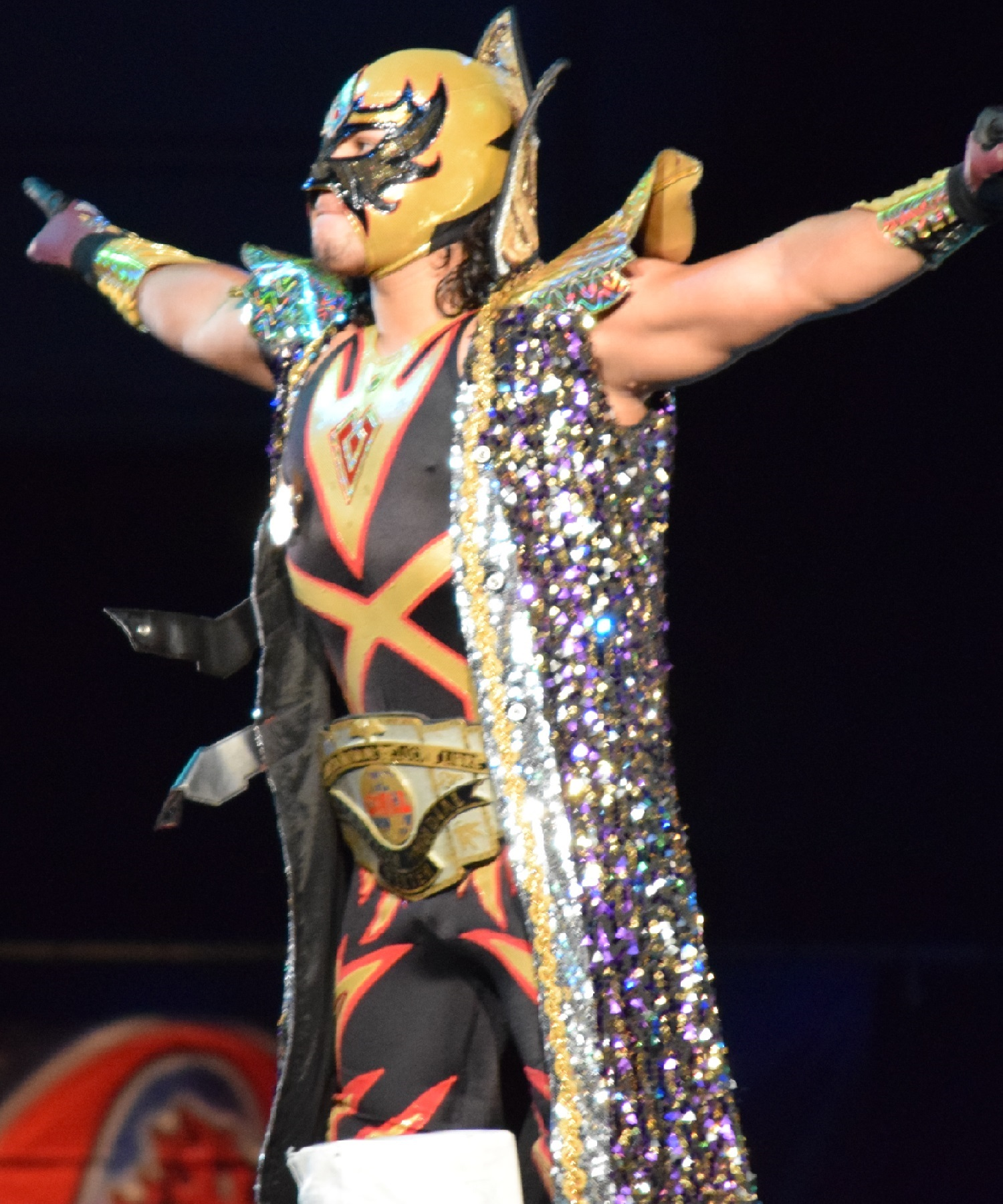
Dorada is a four-time CMLL World Welterweight Champion

- Consejo Mundial de Lucha Libre
  - CMLL World Super Lightweight Championship (1 time)
  - CMLL World Trios Championship (2 times) – with La Sombra and La Máscara (1) and Místico and Valiente (1)
  - CMLL World Welterweight Championship (4 times)
  - Mexican National Trios Championship (1 time) – with Metro and Stuka Jr.
  - NWA World Historic Welterweight Championship (1 time)
  - Occidente Welterweight Championship (1 time)
  - CMLL Torneo Nacional de Parejas Increíbles (2010, 2011) – with Atlantis
  - Torneo Corona – with La Sombra
  - CMLL Trio of the Year (2010) – with La Sombra and La Máscara
- Mucha Lucha Atlanta
  - MLA Global Championship (1 time)
- New Japan Pro-Wrestling
  - Fantastica Mania Tag Tournament (2015) – with Atlantis
- Pro Wrestling Illustrated
  - Ranked No. 130 of the top 500 singles wrestlers in the PWI 500 in 2018
- WWE
  - WWE 24/7 Championship (1 time)

== Luchas de Apuestas record ==
Winner (wager)	Loser (wager)	Location	Event	Date	Notes
Metalik (mask)	Jeque (hair)	Guadalajara, Jalisco	CMLL show	May 18, 2008	
