= Atlantis (wrestler) =

Mexican professional wrestler

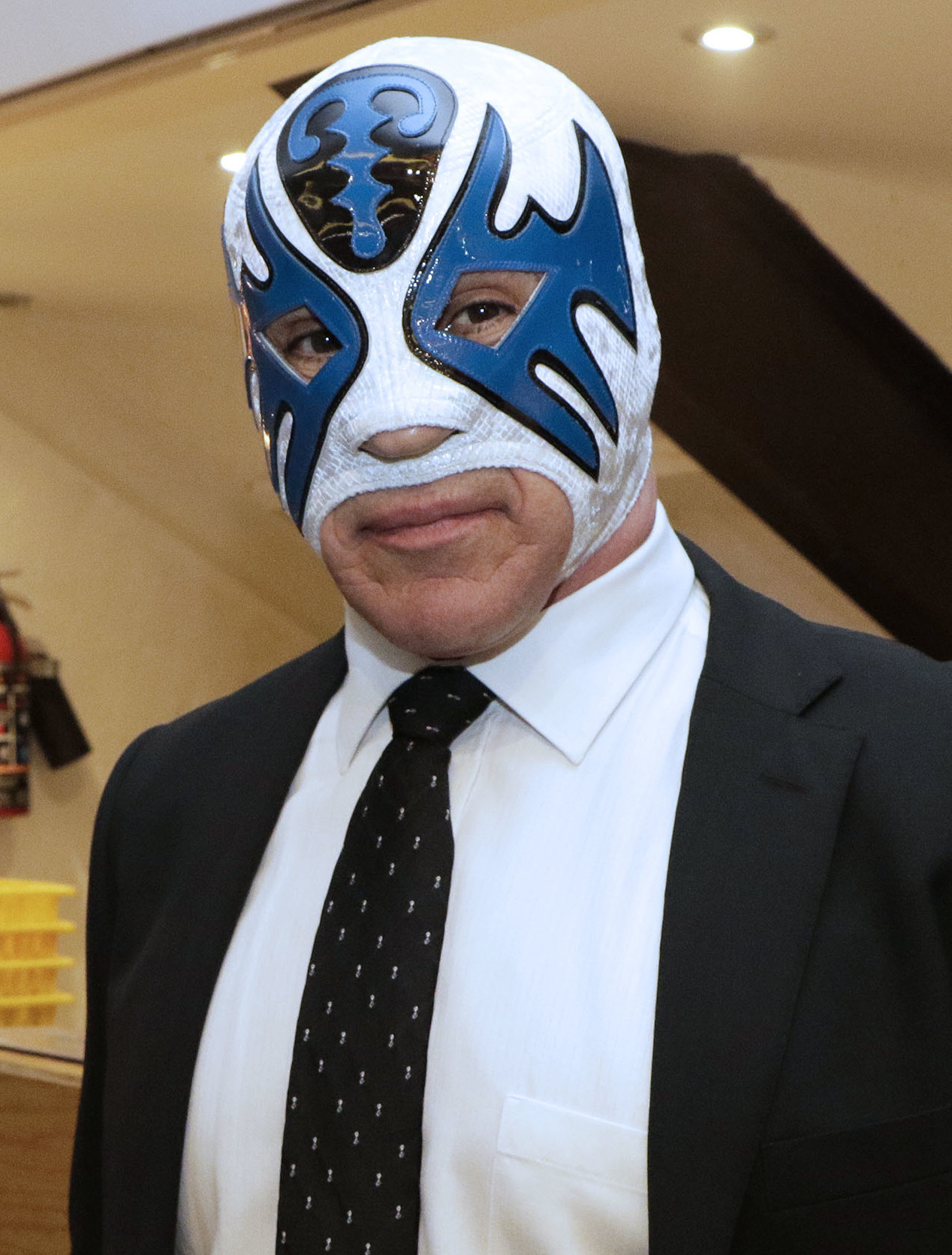
- Atlantis in November 2018

Personal information
- Born: September 28, 1962 (age 64) Los Altos, Jalisco, Mexico

Professional wrestling career
- Ring name: Atlantis
- Billed height: 1.73 m (5 ft 8 in)
- Billed weight: 82 kg (181 lb)
- Billed from: Guadalajara, Jalisco, Mexico
- Trained by: Diablo Velazco
- Debut: June 12, 1983

Atlantis (born September 28, 1962) is a Mexican professional wrestler signed to Consejo Mundial de Lucha Libre (CMLL). One of the longest-tenured wrestlers in CMLL history, his ring name is derived from the fabled city. His real name is not a matter of public record, as is often the case with masked wrestlers in Mexico, where their private lives are kept a secret from the wrestling fans.

Trained by Diablo Velasco, Atlantis made his in-ring debut in 1983 and has since held a large number of professional wrestling championships, including the CMLL World Light Heavyweight Championship, CMLL World Tag Team Championship, CMLL World Trios Championship, Mexican National Light Heavyweight Championship, Mexican National Middleweight Championship, Mexican National Tag Team Championship, Mexican National Trios Championship, NWA World Light Heavyweight Championship and NWA World Middleweight Championship. He has also won the masks of several prominent wrestlers including Talismán, Kung Fu, Villano III, Último Guerrero and La Sombra. Outside of CMLL, Atlantis has wrestled in Japan for New Japan Pro-Wrestling (NJPW) and Michinoku Pro Wrestling, where he won the Tohoku Junior Heavyweight Championship, and in the United States for World Championship Wrestling (WCW), Chikara, Ring of Honor (ROH) and Major League Wrestling (MLW).

Atlantis earned the nickname El idolo de los Niños (the "Children's Idol") as he was always a favorite with the younger fans. He even retained the nickname when he worked as a rudo (heel or "bad guy" character) for several years as part of Los Guerreros de la Atlantida. He starred in several lucha films in the 1990s, including one in which he co-starred with Octagón: Octagón y Atlantis, la revancha ("Octagón and Atlantis, the rematch").

== Professional wrestling career ==
=== Consejo Mundial de Lucha Libre (1983–present) ===
==== El idolo de los Niños (1983–2005) ====
He made his professional wrestling debut on June 12, 1983, after training for under a year with world-renowned Mexican wrestling trainer Diablo Velasco. He adopted the masked tecnico (face) ring persona of "Atlantis", a supposed warrior from the lost city of Atlantis, donning a mask with an image of two fish, becoming a regular for Empresa Mexicana de Lucha Libre (EMLL). On November 30, 1984, he defeated Jerry Estrada to win the Mexican National Middleweight Championship, the first title of his career, holding it for 457 days until losing to Talismán on March 2, 1986. By 1988, Atlantis had formed a regular tag team with Ángel Azteca, defeating Los Infernales (Masakre and MS-1) to win the Mexican National Tag Team Championship on March 6. Three months later, he became a double champion, defeating Kung Fu for the NWA World Middleweight Championship, the highest championship in the middleweight division; he lost it to Emilio Charles Jr. 37 days later. He regained the title on July 20, losing it back to Charles two weeks later. On May 25, 1990, after 811 days, Atlantis and Azteca lost their championship to Bestia Salvaje and Pierroth Jr., leading to a storyline where Azteca attacked Atlantis, turning rudo (heel). The feud between the two continued off and on over the years until Azteca's death in 2007; they remained close friends backstage.

Atlantis was one of the key figures in the "rebranding" of EMLL to Consejo Mundial de Lucha Libre (CMLL) in 1990. In 1991, Atlantis starred in the movie La Fuerza Bruta ("The Brute Power") and subsequently featured in another with Octagón, Octagón y Atlantis, la revancha ("Octagón and Atlantis, the revenge"), which premiered in 1992. On April 4, 1991, Atlantis, Octagón, and Máscara Sagrada, nicknamed "Los Movie Stars", defeated Los Thundercats (Leono, Panthro and Tigro) to win the Mexican National Trios Championship, but lost it to Los Hermanos Dinamita (Cien Caras, Máscara Año 2000 and Universo 2000) on August 11. Not long after, Octagón and Sagrada left CMLL to join the recently formed Asistencia Asesoría y Administración (AAA) before the "Atlantis y Octagón" movie premiered in theaters. Atlantis was also offered an AAA contract, but chose to stay with CMLL. On March 3, 1993, Atlantis lost the NWA World Middleweight Championship to Mano Negra, later unmasking Negra by defeating him in a Lucha de Apuestas ("bet match") in the main event of the CMLL 60th Anniversary Show on October 1. On March 2, 1994, Atlantis moved to the light heavyweight division, defeating Dr. Wagner Jr. to win the CMLL World Light Heavyweight Championship, which he held for 655 days.

On November 3, 1995, Atlantis and Rayo de Jalisco Jr. won the CMLL World Tag Team Championship from The Headhunters. Despite losing the title in August 1996, Atlantis and Lizmark won it from La Ola Blanca (El Hijo del Gladiador and Gran Markus Jr.), which was vacated twelve days later after an inconclusive match with the Headhunters. In 1997, they and Mr. Niebla formed La Ola Azul ("The Blue Wave"), defeating Charles, El Satánico and Rey Bucanero for the CMLL World Trios Championship on April 29, holding it until an injury to Mr. Niebla forced them to give up the title in October 1998. On May 10, 1999, Atlantis defeated Wagner for his second CMLL World Light Heavyweight Championship, losing it to Villano III, whom he had a long-running feud with, on November 22. The feud culminated in a Lucha de Apuestas at Juicio Final ("Final Judgment") on March 17, 2000, where Atlantis unmasked Villano III in a match that was voted the Wrestling Observer Newsletter's 2000 Match of the Year. On June 16, 2002, Atlantis, Mr. Niebla and Black Warrior defeated Blue Panther, Fuerza Guerrera and Wagner to win the trios championship, holding it for 278 days. On June 25, 2004, Atlantis and Blue Panther defeated Los Guerreros del Infierno (Último Guerrero and Bucanero) to win the CMLL World Tag Team Championship. By this time, Atlantis was stagnating as a tecnico, prompting him to turn on Panther during a title match, ending their reign at 280 days and turning rudo for the first time in his career.

==== Los Guerreros de la Atlantida (2005–2011) ====
The rudo Atlantis subsequently joined Los Guerreros del Infierno, which was renamed Los Guerreros de la Atlantida ("The Warriors of the Atlantis") out of respect for their new co-leader. 2005 turned out to be Atlantis' strongest and most successful year, as he won the International Gran Prix , the NWA World Light Heavyweight Championship, and that year's Leyenda de Plata ("The Silver Legend") tournament. On September 29, 2009, Los Guerrero de la Atlantida won the vacant CMLL World Trios Championship by defeating Aguayo Jr., Héctor Garza and Shocker in a tournament final. On November 2, Atlantis won his fourth CMLL World Tag Team Championship, this time teaming with Último Guerrero to defeat Místico and Negro Casas.

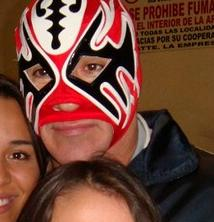
Atlantis often wore a red mask as a rudo

On January 22, 2010, Atlantis and Máscara Dorada participated in the Torneo Nacional de Parejas Increibles ("National Incredible Pairs Tournament"), where a tecnico is paired with a rudo. They defeated Dragón Rojo Jr. and La Sombra in the first round, Mr. Niebla and Máximo in the quarter-finals and Místico and Averno in the semi-finals. On February 5, Atlantis (wrestling as a tecnico and donning his old white mask) and Dorada defeated Casas and La Máscara in the finals to win the tournament. On July 12, at the Promociones Gutiérrez 1st Anniversary Show, Atlantis participated in a match where ten men from five parejas increibles teams put their mask on the line, with the losing team being forced to wrestle each other for their masks. Olímpico was his partner, facing off against the teams of Místico and El Oriental, La Sombra and Histeria, El Alebrije and Volador Jr., and Averno and Guerrero. They were ultimately the last team to escape the match. At the CMLL 77th Anniversary Show on September 3, Atlantis was one of fourteen men putting their mask on the line in a steel cage Lucha de Apuestas, keeping it safe as the ninth man to leave the cage.

On November 2, Atlantis was scheduled to challenge for the CMLL World Tag Team Championship alongside Guerrero, but could not partake in the match due to injury and was replaced by Dragón Rojo Jr., who won the title and was made an official member of Los Guerreros de la Atlantida. On February 25, 2011, Atlantis and Dorada defeated Blue Panther and Dragón Rojo Jr. to win the Torneo Nacional de Parejas Increíbles for the second year in a row. In June, Atlantis replaced an injured Shocker and won the Forjando un Ídolo ("Forging an Idol") tournament with Delta and Guerrero Maya Jr. On July 31, Atlantis and Bucanero made an unadvertised appearance for American promotion Chikara, losing to F.I.S.T. (Chuck Taylor and Johnny Gargano) via disqualification, when Gargano faked taking a low blow from Atlantis. After weeks of tension between Atlantis and Guerrero, CMLL held a press conference on August 11, where Atlantis officially turned tecnico and left Los Guerreros de la Atlantida.

==== Los Reyes de la Atlantida (2011–2018) ====
In their grudge match on September 23, Atlantis defeated Guerrero. On November 16, Atlantis announced that he was officially forming a stable named Los Reyes de la Atlantida ("The Kings of the Atlantis") with Delta and Guerrero Maya Jr. At Sin Piedad ("No Mercy") on December 16, they defeated Los Invasores (Olímpico, Psicosis and Volador Jr.) for the Mexican National Trios Championship. At Homenaje a Dos Leyendas on March 2, 2012, Atlantis won his third Torneo Nacional de Parejas Increíbles in a row with Mr. Niebla. On June 22, Los Reyes de la Atlantida lost the Mexican National Trios Championship to Los Depredadores del Aire (Black Warrior, Mr. Águila and Volador Jr.). On August 3, Atlantis and Diamante Azul defeated Dragón Rojo Jr. and Guerrero to win the CMLL World Tag Team Championship. On October 30, Los Reyes de la Atlantida regained their title. On November 13, Atlantis and Azul lost the title to El Terrible and Tama Tonga. On December 16, Los Reyes de la Atlantida lost their title to Los Invasores' Kraneo, Mr. Águila and Psicosis II.

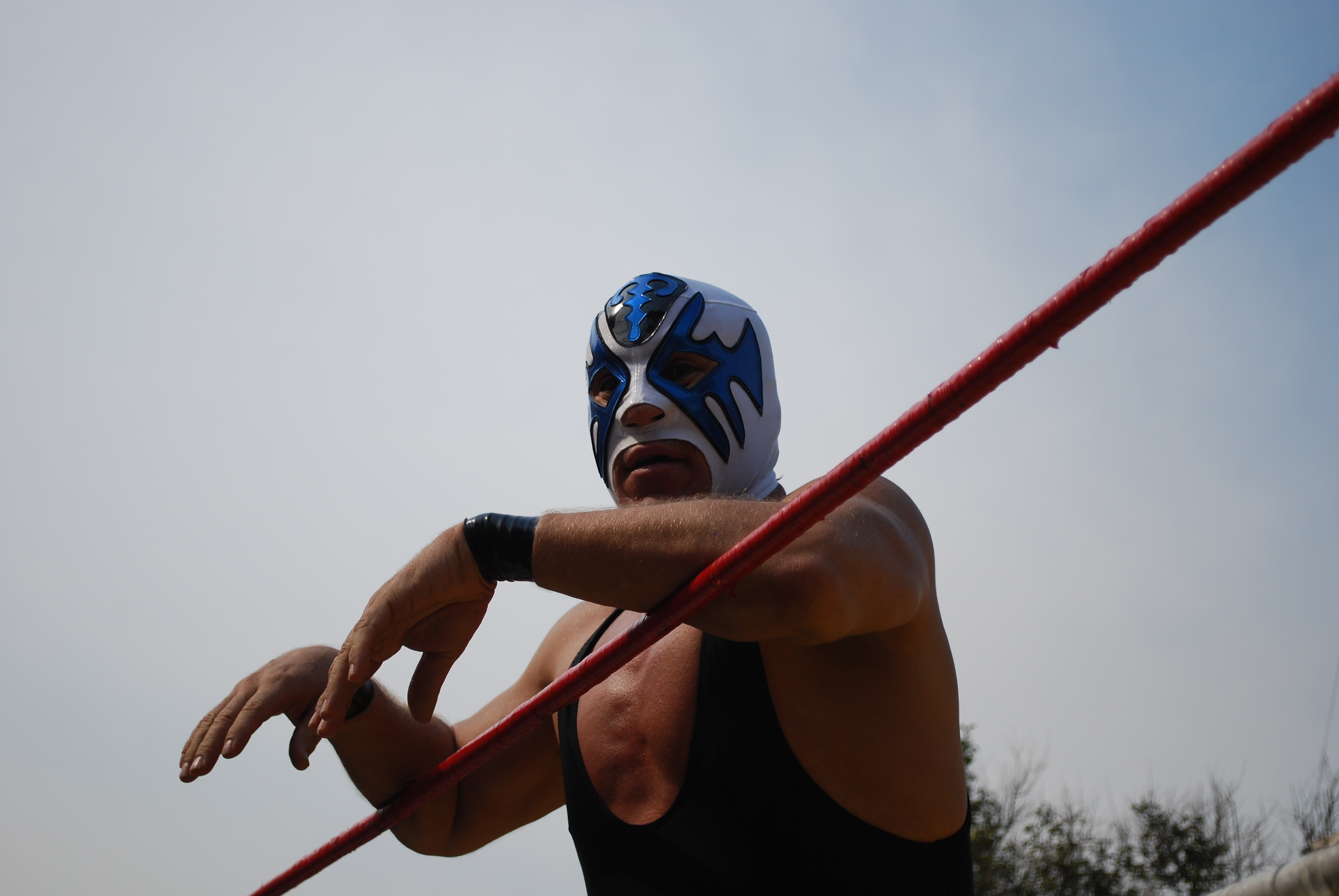
Atlantis in January 2013

In early 2013, Atlantis and Guerrero were forced to put their differences aside for the Torneo Nacional de Parejas Increibles. They defeated Valiente and Pólvora, Azul and Euforia and Dragón Rojo Jr. and Niebla Roja en route to the finals, which they lost to La Sombra and Volador Jr. at Homenaje a Dos Leyendas on March 15. After the loss, Atlantis attacked Guerrero and tore his mask apart. He then challenged Guerrero to a Lucha de Apuestas, which was not immediately accepted. They officially signed a contract for the mask vs. mask match on March 21, albeit with no date announced. On April 12, Atlantis teamed with Hombre Bala Jr. for the Torneo Gran Alternativa ("Great Alternative Tournament"); they defeated Akuma and Mephisto in the first round, Averno and Taurus in the quarter-finals and Guerrero and Guerrero Negro Jr. in the semi-finals, but lost to Boby Zavala and Rey Escorpión in the finals on April 26. During the celebration of Atlantis' 30th anniversary as a wrestler on May 3, Guerrero appeared after a match to berate him, only for a second Último Guerrero to attack Atlantis from behind. The two identically dressed Guerreros proceeded to beat up Atlantis and tear his mask apart. Following the match, Último Guerrero introduced his brother "Gran Guerrero". At the CMLL 80th Anniversary Show on September 13, Atlantis and Guerrero teamed in a Relevos Suicidas match for the mask vs. mask match opportunity, but lost to La Sombra and Volador Jr., who advanced to the Lucha de Apuestas against each other.

On March 21, 2014, Atlantis won the Torneo Nacional de Parejas Increibles for the fourth time with Euforia. On June 20, Atlantis won the Leyenda de Azul ("The Blue Legend") tournament, scoring the last elimination over Guerrero, whom he defeated in their highly anticipated Lucha de Apuestas in the main event of the CMLL 81st Anniversary Show on September 19, forcing Guerrero to unmask after the match. On April 26, Los Reyes de la Atlantida won their record-breaking third Mexican National Trios Championship from La Peste Negra (Casas, El Felino and Mr. Niebla), but lost it to Los Hijos del Infierno (Ephesto, Mephisto and Lucifierno) on August 9. On August 24, Atlantis defeated Mephisto to win the Mexican National Light Heavyweight Championship. During this time, Atlantis faced off against Los Ingobernables on multiple occasions, with La Sombra targeting Atlantis and tearing his mask apart. This led to a Lucha de Apuestas at the CMLL 82nd Anniversary Show on September 18, where Atlantis defeated La Sombra and forced him to unmask afterwards. On October 16, Atlantis defeated Guerrero to win the champion-designated Universal Championship tournament.

In March 2016, Atlantis was paired with Flyer for the Torneo Gran Alternativa, but they were eliminated by Escorpión and Fujin. The following month, Atlantis was paired with Gran Guerrero for the Torneo Nacional de Parejas Increibles, defeating Brazo de Plata and Kraneo in the first round and Dragon Lee and La Máscara in the quarter-finals, before losing to Caristico and Cibernético in the semi-finals. At the CMLL 83rd Anniversary Show on September 2, Atlantis, Caristico and Dorada defeated Bárbaro Cavernario, Casas and El Felino. He and Euforia rejoined forces for the Torneo Nacional de Parejas Increibles in February 2017, but ultimately lost to Último Guerrero and Valiente. At Homenaje a Dos Leyendas on March 17, Atlantis, Caristico and Corleone lost to Kraneo, La Máscara and Rush. On June 20, he unsuccessfully challenged Hechicero for the NWA World Historic Light Heavyweight Championship. At the CMLL 85th Anniversary Show on September 14, 2018, he, Místico and Soberano Jr. lost to Nueva Generación Dinamita (El Cuatrero, Forastero and Sansón). On November 6, Atlantis lost the Mexican National Light Heavyweight Championship to Cavernario.

==== Teaming with Atlantis Jr. (2018–present) ====
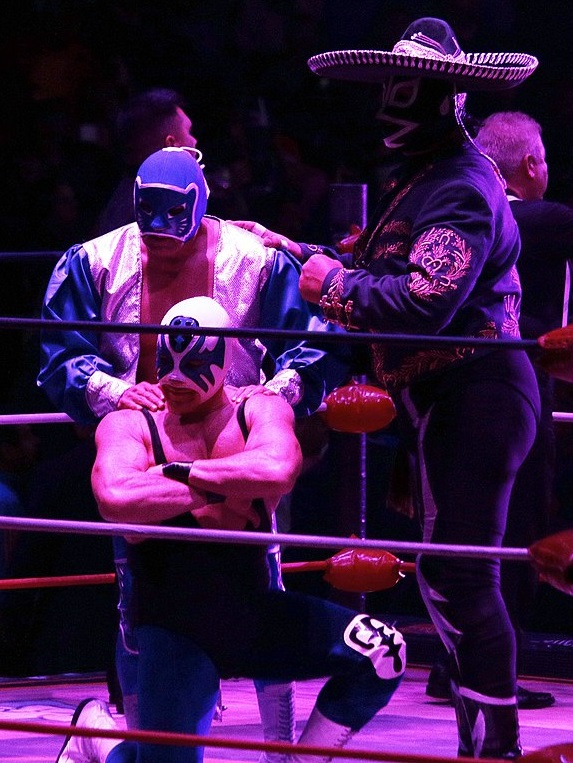
Atlantis (kneeling) with Blue Panther and Rayo de Jalisco Jr. at Leyendas Mexicanas in November 2018

In November 2018, Atlantis Jr., the legitimate son of Atlantis, was introduced into CMLL. Their first match as a team in CMLL took place on January 29, 2019, as they and Caristico defeated Cavernario, El Hijo del Villano III and Templario. Later that year, Atlantis suffered an injury that kept him out of action for the entirety of 2020, until making his return on April 24, 2021. In early 2022, Atlantis and Los Guerreros Laguneros (Último Guerrero and Gran Guerrero) made it to the finals of a tournament for the vacant CMLL World Trios Championship, but were defeated on March 18 at Homenaje a Dos Leyendas by Los Malditos (El Sagrado, Gemelo Diablo I and Gemelo Diablo II). At the CMLL 89th Anniversary Show on September 16, Atlantis and Fuerza Guerrera retained their masks when Averno and Último Guerrero defeated them in the semi-finals of the Cuadrangular Eliminatorio de Parejas Increíbles, where the winners advanced to a Lucha de Apuesta in the main event. On 16 December, Atlantis and Arkalis lost to Panterita del Ring Jr. and Volador Jr. in the first round of the Torneo Gran Alternativa.

At Homenaje a Dos Leyendas on March 17, 2023, Atlantis, his son and Místico defeated Dragón Rojo Jr., Niebla Roja and Templario. At the CMLL 90th Anniversary Show on September 16, he teamed with Blue Panther and the returning Octagón to defeat El Satánico, Guerrera and Virus. On June 15, 2025, Atlantis and Atlantis Jr. won the Copa Dinastia by defeating Blue Panther and El Hijo de Blue Panther in the finals. On March 20, 2026, Atlantis was involved in El Satánico's retirement match at Homenaje a Dos Leyendas, a three-way elimination match also involving Blue Panther, where he was the first wrestler eliminated by Satánico.

=== New Japan Pro-Wrestling (2011–present) ===
In November 2010, it was announced that Atlantis would debut for New Japan Pro-Wrestling (NJPW) in January 2011 as part of the two-night CMLL and NJPW co-promoted Fantastica Mania 2011 tour. During the first night on January 22, he and Okumura unsuccessfully challenged Bad Intentions (Giant Bernard and Karl Anderson) for the IWGP Tag Team Championship. The next night, he, Dragón Rojo Jr. and Taichi lost to Bad Intentions and Jushin Thunder Liger. Atlantis returned at Wrestle Kingdom VI in the Tokyo Dome on January 4, 2012, teaming with Taichi, TAKA Michinoku and Valiente in a loss to Liger, KUSHIDA, Máscara Dorada and Tiger Mask. In January 2013, Atlantis, as a late replacement for an injured Místico II, took part in the three-day Fantastica Mania 2013 tour. During the first night on January 18, he, Liger and Tiger Mask lost to Gedo, Jado and Mephisto. The following night, Atlantis defeated Euforia. During the third and final night, Atlantis, IWGP Heavyweight Champion Hiroshi Tanahashi and IWGP Junior Heavyweight Champion Prince Devitt defeated Euforia, Kazuchika Okada and Mephisto.

Atlantis returned to Japan during the Fantastica Mania 2015 tour in January 2015, where he and Dorada won the Fantastica Mania 2015 Tag Team Tournament. During the Fantastica Mania 2016 tour the following year, he was part of the losing side against Los Ingobernables de Japón (Tetsuya Naito, Bushi and Evil) on most nights. He and various partners also faced the stable during the Fantastica Mania 2017 and Fantastica Mania 2018 tours. On January 11, 2019, Atlantis teamed with Atlantis Jr. in his in-ring debut during the first night of the Fantastica Mania 2019 tour, where they were defeated by Sansón and Okumura, who stole their masks afterwards. Five nights later, they lost to El Cuatrero and Sansón in the semi-finals of the Family Tag Tournament. On January 21, the final night of the tour, Atlantis, Ángel de Oro and Titán unsuccessfully challenged Nueva Generación Dinamita for the Mexican National Trios Championship.

At Fighting Spirit Unleashed on October 28, 2023, Atlantis, Atlantis Jr., Tanahashi and Místico defeated Adrian Quest, Rocky Romero, Soberano Jr. and Tiger Mask. On November 10, at Lonestar Shootout, he, Máscara Dorada and Tiger Mask defeated Hechicero, Romero and Último Guerrero. During the Fantastica Mania 2026 tour in February 2026, Atlantis and his son competed in the Fantastica Mania 2026 Tag Team Tournament, defeating CozyMax (Okumura and Satoshi Kojima) in the first round before losing to Averno and Magnus in the semi-finals.

=== Ring of Honor (2018, 2025) ===
On June 15, 2018, Atlantis made his Ring of Honor (ROH) debut at State of the Art, teaming with Guerrero Maya Jr. and Stuka Jr. as "Team CMLL" to defeat SoCal Uncensored (Christopher Daniels, Frankie Kazarian and Scorpio Sky). The next night, they unsuccessfully challenged The Kingdom (Matt Taven, TK O'Ryan and Vinny Marseglia) for the ROH World Six-Man Tag Team Championship. Atlantis next appeared on the February 27, 2025 episode of ROH Wrestling, teaming with Esfinge and Fuego to defeat Euforia, Gran Guerrero and Rocky Romero.

== Championships and accomplishments ==
- Empresa Mexicana de Lucha Libre / Consejo Mundial de Lucha Libre
  - CMLL World Light Heavyweight Championship (2 times)
  - CMLL World Tag Team Championship (5 times) – with Rayo de Jalisco Jr. (1), Lizmark (1), Blue Panther (1), Último Guerrero (1), and Diamante Azul (1)
  - CMLL World Trios Championship (4 times) – with Mr. Niebla and Lizmark (1), Mr. Niebla and Black Warrior (1), and Último Guerrero and Tarzan Boy (1), Último Guerrero and Negro Casas
  - Mexican National Light Heavyweight Championship (1 time) (Note: the Mexico City Boxing and Wrestling commission sanctions the championship but it is promoted by CMLL.)
  - Mexican National Middleweight Championship (1 time)
  - Mexican National Tag Team Championship (1 time) – with Ángel Azteca
  - Mexican National Trios Championship (4 times) – with Octagón and Máscara Sagrada (1) and Delta and Guerrero Maya Jr. (3) (Note: the Mexico City Boxing and Wrestling commission sanctions the championship but it was promoted by CMLL at the time.)
  - NWA World Light Heavyweight Championship (1 time) (Note: CMLL has not been a member of the National Wrestling Alliance since the 1980s, though the promotion still uses the NWA initials for the NWA World Light Heavyweight Championship. However, the NWA no longer recognizes or sanctions any CMLL championship that still uses the NWA initials.)
  - NWA World Middleweight Championship (3 times)
  - Torneo Gran Alternativa (2005) – with La Máscara
  - Copa Salvador Lutteroth (1996)
  - Copa Victoria (1997)
  - La Copa Diablo Velazco (2007)
  - Copa Bobby Bonales (2011)
  - Copa Express (2014) - with Titán
  - Copa Dinastia (2025) – with Atlantis Jr.
  - Forjando un Ídolo: Guerra Continúa (2011) – with Delta and Guerrero Maya Jr.
  - International Gran Prix (2005)
  - Leyenda de Azul (2014)
  - Leyenda de Plata (2005)
  - Torneo Nacional de Parejas Increibles (2010, 2011, 2012, 2014) – with Máscara Dorada (2010, 2011), Mr. Niebla (2012) and Euforia (2014)
  - Torneo Increibles de Parejas, Arena Puebla – with Volador Jr.
  - Torneo de Parejas Increibles Internacionales (2016) - with Ultimo Guerrero
  - Universal Championship (2015)
  - CMLL Tag Team of the Year (2010) – with Último Guerrero
  - Torneo Cibernetico De Leyendas (2023)
- Lucha Libre Azteca
  - Azteca Championship (1 time)
- Michinoku Pro Wrestling
  - Tohoku Junior Heavyweight Championship (1 time)
  - Fukumen World League (2003)
- New Japan Pro-Wrestling
  - Fantastica Mania 2015 Tag Tournament – with Máscara Dorada
- Pro Wrestling Illustrated
  - PWI ranked him #34 of the top 500 singles wrestlers in the PWI 500 in 2006
  - PWI ranked him #225 of the top 500 singles wrestlers of the PWI Years in 2003
- Universal Wrestling Entertainment
  - UWE Tag Team Championship (1 time) – with Último Guerrero
- World Wrestling Association
  - WWA Light Heavyweight Championship (1 time, current)
- Wrestling Observer Newsletter
  - Match of the Year: 2000 (Atlantis vs. Villano III in Mexico City on March 17)
  - Wrestling Observer Newsletter Hall of Fame (Class of 2013)

== Luchas de Apuestas record ==
Winner (wager)	Loser (wager)	Location	Event	Date	Notes
Atlantis (mask)	Talismán (mask)	Mexico City	EMLL 51st Anniversary Show	September 21, 1984	
Atlantis (mask)	Hombre Bala (mask)	Mexico City	Juicio Final	December 5, 1986	
Atlantis (mask) and El Satánico (hair)	Tierra Viento y Fuego (mask) and MS-1 (hair)	Mexico City	EMLL 56th Anniversary Show	September 22, 1989	
Atlantis (mask)	Kung Fu (mask)	Mexico City	Live event	October 26, 1990	
Lizmark and Atlantis (mask)	The Animals (masks) (Animal I and II)	Mexico City	Live event	November 25, 1990	
Atlantis (mask)	Mano Negra (mask)	Mexico City	CMLL 60th Anniversary Show	October 1, 1993	
Atlantis (mask)	Rey Pirata (mask)	León, Guanajuato	Live event	March 22, 1999	
Atlantis (mask)	Gran Markus Jr. (hair)	Guadalajara, Jalisco	Live event	July 19, 1999	
Atlantis (mask)	Villano III (mask)	Mexico City	Juicio Final	March 17, 2000	
Atlantis (mask)	Silver Fox (mask)	Guadalajara, Jalisco	Live event	June 18, 2000	
Atlantis (mask)	El Boricua (mask)	Nuevo Laredo, Tamaulipas	Live event	August 13, 2001	(Note: Unmasked as Big Von Hamemberg, a fake name)
Atlantis (mask)	El Boricua (mask)	Celaya, Guanajuato	Live event	August 15, 2001	
Atlantis (mask)	El Hijo de Gran Markus (mask)	N/A	Live event	2003	
Atlantis (mask)	Fidel Sierra (hair)	Woodburn, Oregon	Live event	October 23, 2004	
Atlantis (mask)	El Padrino (mask)	Guatemala City	Live event	June 10, 2012	(Note: This was a four-way match, that also involved Voltron and Último Guerrero.)
Atlantis (mask)	Último Guerrero (mask)	Mexico City	CMLL 81st Anniversary Show	September 19, 2014	
Atlantis (mask)	La Sombra (mask)	Mexico City	CMLL 82nd Anniversary Show	September 18, 2015	

== Filmography ==
- La Fuerza Bruta ("The Brute Power") – 1991
- Octagón y Atlantis, la revancha ("Octagón and Atlantis, the revenge") – 1992
- Atlantis al rescate ("Atlantis to the rescue") – 2007
