= List of Mexican magazines =

List of magazines published in Mexico

The following is an incomplete list of current and defunct magazines published in Mexico. These publications are issued in Spanish and other languages, covering a wide range of topics such as culture, politics, entertainment, lifestyle, and business.

== 0–9 ==
- 15 a 20
- 24xSegundo
- 4 Ruedas Magazine

== A ==
- A Quien Corresponda
- Actual
- ¡Alarma!
- Almas
- Alto Nivel
- Arqueología Mexicana
- Arquine
- Artes de México
- Atomix
- Automóvil Panamericano

== B ==
- Bazar Gráfico
- Bitácora
- Box y Lucha
- Buenhogar

== C ==
- Caballero
- Cabo Living
- Los Cabos Magazine
- Campo Bravo
- Casas & Gente
- Chilango
- Cine Premiere
- Cinemanía
- Clara
- Club Nintendo
- Contenido
- La Correa Feminista
- Creativa

== D ==
- Debate Feminista
- Día Siete
- Drik
- DYN

== E ==
- El Hijo del Ahuizote
- Electrónica y Servicio
- Entorno
- Época
- Eres
- Eres Novia
- eSemanal
- Etcétera
- Expansión

== F ==
- Fahrenheit
- Fem
- Fotozoom
- Furia Musical

== G ==
- Gatopardo
- Gefao

== H ==
- H Para Hombres
- Haz Negocio
- Hoy

== I ==
- Inkubo Magazine

== J ==
- Jueves de Excélsior

== L ==
- Letras Libres
- Luchas

== M ==
- Matiz
- Max
- Maxim en Español
- Men's Health
- MEOW Magazine
- México Desconocido
- México Volitivo
- Mujer Ejecutiva
- Mujer Nueva
- Mundo Ejecutivo
- Mundo Minero
- Muy Interesante

== N ==
- Neo
- Nexos
- Noche
- La Nota México
- Notas Fiscales
- Notas Para Ti

== O ==
- Observer Magazine
- Open
- Ocean Blue Magazine

== P ==
- Papel de Literatura
- Planeta X
- Proceso
- El Publicista

== Q ==
- Quién
- Quo

== R ==
- Radiador Magazine
- Raíces
- Rebelde
- Red
- Replicante
- Revista Adhoc
- Revista Telemundo

== S ==
- Salud Mental
- Ser Mamá
- Siempre!
- Soy Entrepreneur
- Súper Luchas
- Switch

== T ==
- Tiempo Libre
- Todo
- Transportes y Turismo
- Tritón
- TV Notas
- TV y Novelas

== U ==
- Undo magazine
- Usa-Mex Infobusiness

== V ==
- Veintitantos
- Vértigo
- Vuelta

== W, X, Y, Z ==
- Zeta

== See also ==
- List of Mexican newspapers
- Media of Mexico
- Culture of Mexico
- Television in Mexico
- Mexican literature
- List of Mexican journalists
