= En Busca de un Ídolo =

Consejo Mundial de Lucha Libre event series

- The logo for the 2012 tournament as shown on the official website

Details
- Promotion: Consejo Mundial de Lucha Libre
- Date established: April 25, 2012
- Current champion: Cavernario
- Date won: June 20, 2014
Statistics
- First champion: Titán
- Most reigns: No multiple tournament winners
- Oldest champion: Vangelis (44 years, 63 days)
- Youngest champion: Cavernario (32 years, 3 days)
- Heaviest champion: Vangelis (95 kilograms (209 lb)
- Lightest champion: Titán (85 kilograms (187 lb)

En Busca de un Ídolo (Spanish for "In search of an idol") is an annual professional wrestling tournament promoted by the Mexican professional wrestling promotion Consejo Mundial de Lucha Libre (CMLL) since 2012 with the purpose of identifying which of the "Rookies" in the tournament would move up the ranks of the promotion. Replacing Forjando un Ídolo from the previous year, the tournament format contained two rounds, first a round-robin tournament group round, with the top four-point earners competing in for a spot in the finals. Wrestlers could earn points in three ways, match results, judges points and points from an online poll available on the 'En Busca de un Ídolo website. Through 2014, no one has participated in more than 1 En Busca de un Ídolo tournament and it has featured 24 wrestlers in total. On May 12, 2015 CMLL announced that the tournament would return for 2015.

== En Busca de un Ídolo winners ==
Year	Winner	Runner up	Date	Reference
2012	Titán	Euforia	May 25, 2012	
2013	Vangelis	Valiente	July 12, 2013	
2014	Cavernario	Hechicero	June 20, 2014	
2015	Boby Zavala	Guerrero Maya Jr.	August 21, 2015	

== Tournament point system and format ==
Wrestlers can earn points in three ways each week during the first and second round of the tournament.

- Match results

- 20 Points for a victory
- 10 Points for a draw
- 0 points for a loss

- Judging

- The tournament also include four judges, referee El Tirantes, ring announcer Miguel Linares and wrestlers Maximo and Negro Casas. The judges could award up to 10 points each based on the way they portray their character, their personality, their charisma, and how much of a fan response they get during their matches.

- Fan poll

- The third way to earn points for the tournament was through an online poll conducted after each match on the En Busca de un Ídolo website. The online poll could give a wrestler a maximum of 40 additional points in the tournament each week.

The tournament featured eight professional wrestlers or luchadors. Still, it was not always split equally between tecnicos (the Lucha Libre term for someone who portrays a "good guy" character) and rudos ("Bad Guys"). Being a professional wrestling tournament, the matches were not won legitimately through athletic competition; it is instead won via predetermined outcomes to the matches that is kept secret from the general public. The teams were not generally divided by their rudo/tecnico status in later years and outside of the first year everyone fought everyone regardless of their rudo or tecnico status. Once the first round was completed, the top four-point earners would move on to round two. Round two was a round-robin tournament between all four wrestlers. At the end of round two the top two point earners would face off in the finals of the tournament with the winner of the match winning the tournament as well.

== En Busca de un Ídolo Participants ==
Name	Year	Rank
Cachorro	2014	4th
Cavernario	2014	1st
Diamante	2012	4th
Dragon Lee	2012	3rd
Dragon Lee (II)	2014	3rd
Euforia	2012	2nd
Fuego	2013	4th
Guerrero Negro Jr.	2014	8th
Hechicero	2014	2nd
El Hijo del Fantasma	2013	5th
Misterioso Jr.	2013	8th
Niebla Roja	2012	5th
Puma King	2012	6th
Tiger	2013	6th
Titán	2012	1st
Tritón	2012	7th
Pólvora	2012	8th
Vangelis	2013	1st
Valiente	2013	2nd
Sangre Azteca	2013	7th
Soberano Jr.	2014	6th
Star Jr.	2014	5th
Stuka Jr.	2013	3rd
Super Halcón Jr.	2014	7th
