= CMLL Torneo Nacional de Parejas Increíbles (2019) =

Mexican professional wrestling tournament

- Poster for the April 26 finale
- Promotion: Consejo Mundial de Lucha Libre
- Date: April 12, 2019; April 19, 2019; April 26, 2019
- City: Mexico City, Mexico
- Venue: Arena México

Event chronology
| ← Previous; Homenaje a Dos Leyendas | Next →: 63. Aniversario de Arena México |

Torneo Nacional de Parejas Increíbles tournaments chronology
| ← Previous; 2018 | Next → 2020 |

The CMLL Torneo Nacional de Parejas Increíbles (2019) or the National Incredible Pairs Tournament (2019) was a tag team Lucha Libre tournament held by the Mexican wrestling promotion Consejo Mundial de Lucha Libre (CMLL). The tournament is based on the Lucha Libre Parejas Increíbles match concept, which pairs two wrestlers of opposite allegiance, one portraying a villain, referred to as a "rudo" in Lucha Libre wrestling terminology, and one portraying a fan favorites, or "técnico".

The 2019 version of the tournament was the tenth year in a row that CMLL held the tournament since the first tournament in 2010. The winners are presented with a trophy but not given any other tangible reward for the victory. The team of Titán (tecnico) and Bárbaro Cavernario (rudo) defeated Volador Jr. and Último Guerrero in the finals of the tournament, after Volador Jr. hit Guerrero by accident, only for Último Guerrero to retaliate against Volador Jr., allowing the unified opponents to win the match.

== History ==
The Mexican professional wrestling promotion Consejo Mundial de Lucha Libre (CMLL; "World Wrestling Council") held their first Torneo Nacional de Parejas Increíbles ("National Incredible Pairs Tournament") in 2010, from January 22 through February 5, marking the beginning of what became an annual tournament. CMLL has previous held Parejas Increíbles tournaments on an irregular basis and often promoted individual Parejas Increíbles and Relevos Increíbles ("Incredible Relay", with teams of three or more wrestlers). The Parejas Increíbles concept is a long-standing tradition in lucha libre and is at times referred to as a "strange bedfellows" match in English speaking countries, because a Pareja Increible consists of a face (referred to as a técnico in Lucha Libre, or a "good guy") and a heel (a rudo, those that portray "the bad guys") teamed up for a specific match, or in this case for a tournament. The 2018 tournament was the ninth annual Parejas Increíbles tournament, and like its predecessors held as part of CMLL's regular Friday night CMLL Super Viernes ("Super Friday") shows.

== Tournament background ==
The tournament featured 15 professional wrestling matches with different wrestlers teaming up, some of whom were involved in pre-existing scripted feuds or storylines while others were simply paired up for the tournament. For the Torneo Nacional de Parejas Increíbles tournaments, CMLL often teamed up a técnico (those that portray the "good guys" in wrestling, also known as faces) and a rudo (the "bad guy" or heels). who are involved in a pre-existing storyline feud at the time of the tournament so that the tournament itself can be used as a storytelling device to help tell the story of escalating confrontations between two feuding wrestlers. The tournament format followed CMLL's traditional tournament formats, with two qualifying blocks of eight teams that competed during the first and second week of the tournament and a final match between the two block winners. The qualifying blocks were all one-fall matches while the tournament final was a best two-out-of-three-falls tag team match.

=== Tournament participants ===
Block A

- Ángel de Oro (T) and La Bestia del Ring (R)
- Blue Panther (T) and Máscara Año 2000 (R)
- Carístico (T) and Mephisto (R)
- Flyer (T) and Forastero (R)
- Guerrero Maya Jr. (T) and Euforia (R)
- Soberano Jr. (T) and Sansón (R)
- Titán (T) and Bárbaro Cavernario (R)
- Tritón (T) and Rey Bucanero (R)

Block B

- Atlantis (T) and Negro Casas (R)
- Audaz (T) and Templario (R)
- Místico (T) and El Cuatrero (R)
- Niebla Roja (T) and El Terrible (R)
- Rush (T) and Vangellys (R)
- Stuka Jr. (T) and Hechicero (R)
- Valiente (T) and Gran Guerrero (R)
- Volador Jr. (T) and Último Guerrero (R)

== Tournament results ==
For the first block of the tournament, the eight tecnico participants started out by competing in a battle royal to determine the brackets for the matches that night. Carístico and Flyer were the first two to be eliminated, which meant that they would wrestle in the first actual tournament match. The winners of the match were Soberano Jr. and Tritón, earning them the longest rest of any of the competitors. The team of Titán and Bárbaro Cavernario came to the ring wearing ring gear that was a mix of both wrestlers' normal style, Cavernario wore one of Titán's masks while Titán wore a leopard print singlet to show their unity. The teams of Carístico and Mephisto, Guerrero Maya Jr. and Euforia, Titán and Bárbaro Cavernario and finally Soberano Jr. and Sansón all qualified for the quarterfinals of the tournament. Carístico and Mephiston defeated Guerrero Maya Jr. and Euforia, while Titán and Bárbaro Cavernario defeated Soberano Jr. and Sansón to set up the semi-final match. The finals, which was also the longest match on the show, saw Titán and Bárbaro Cavernario win the match to qualify for the finals.

The other bracket of the tournament took place the following Friday night. For this block, it was the rudo competitors who participated in the seeding battle royal. Vangellys and Gran Guerrero won the battle royal in 3:14 to earn the longest rest before their tournament match. In the first round Místico and El Cuatrero defeated Stuka Jr. and Hechicero, Atlantis and Negro Casas defeated Audaz and Templario, Último Guerrero and Volador Jr. defeated Niebla Roja and El Terrible, and finally Rush and Vangellys defeated Gran Guerrero and Valiente. The second round saw the teams of Último Guerrero and Volador Jr., and Rush and Vangellys qualify for the semi-final match. While Último Guerrero and Volador Jr. had often been on opposite sides over the years in CMLL, they worked together without any problems as they defeated Rush and Vangelly to earn the second spot in the finals the following week.

The final was the main event of CMLL's 63. Aniversario de Arena México show held on April 26. For the finals, the two teams faced off under best-two-out-of-three falls rules. Guerrero and Volador Jr. took the first fall, while Titán and Bárbaro Cavernario tied it up by winning the second fall shortly after. During the third fall, Volador Jr. accidentally kicked Último Guerrero when their opponent moved, which visibly upset Guerrero. Later when Volador Jr. dove onto an opponent on the floor Guerrero attacked his own partner, slamming him on the floor. The fall out between the two later resulted in Titán and Bárbaro Cavernario taking the third and final fall to win the tournament.

== Tournament brackets ==
Round of 16
Carístico and Mephisto | W
Flyer and Forastero
Ángel de Oro and La Bestia del Ring
Guerrero Maya Jr. and Euforia | W
Titán and Bárbaro Cavernario | W
Blue Panther and Máscara Año 2000
Soberano Jr. and Sansón | W
Tritón and Rey Bucanero
Místico and El Cuatrero | W
Stuka Jr. and Hechicero
Audaz and Templario
Atlantis and Negro Casas | W
Niebla Roja and El Terrible
Volador Jr. and Último Guerrero | W
Rush and Vangellys | W
Valiente (T) and Gran Guerrero

Quarterfinals
Carístico and Mephisto | W
Guerrero Maya Jr. and Euforia
Titán and Bárbaro Cavernario | W
Soberano Jr. and Sansón
Místico and El Cuatrero | W
Atlantis and Negro Casas
Volador Jr. and Último Guerrero | W
Rush and Vangellys

Semifinals
Carístico and Mephisto
Titán and Bárbaro Cavernario | W
Místico and El Cuatrero
Volador Jr. and Último Guerrero | W

Finals
Titán and Bárbaro Cavernario | W
Volador Jr. and Último Guerrero
