= Tritón =

Tritón may refer to:

- Tritón (magazine)
- Tritón (wrestler)
