= Carla Ossa =

Colombian model (born 1985)

- Born: 28 June 1985 (age 41); Medellín, Antioquia, Colombia
- Modeling information
- Height: 5 ft 10.5 in (1.79 m)
- Hair color: Brown
- Eye color: Brown
- Agency: MC2 Model Management; INforma models

Carla Ossa (born June 28, 1985) is a Colombian model.

== Background ==
Ossa was born in Medellín, Colombia in 1985. Ossa started out as a child model, but at the age of 12, had to leave modelling as she had grown out of children's clothes.

== Career ==
When Ossa returned to the world of modelling, she was represented by Elite Model Management, and made numerous appearances on the front covers of magazines, especially in South America, including Self, Veintitantos, Vanidades, and Ocala. Ossa has also enjoyed success in Germany, appearing on the front covers of Für Sie, and Freundin. Ossa has also appeared in campaigns for the fashion chains Bonprix, Burger King, Nair. She also works for the fashion labels and clothing companies Cubavera, Cato Fashions, Magram, Metrostyle, Alloy and Venus Swimwear. She also appeared in the music video for the song Vivir by the pop singer Juan Escobar.
