= En Busca de un Ídolo 2012 =

2012 Mexican professional wrestling tournament

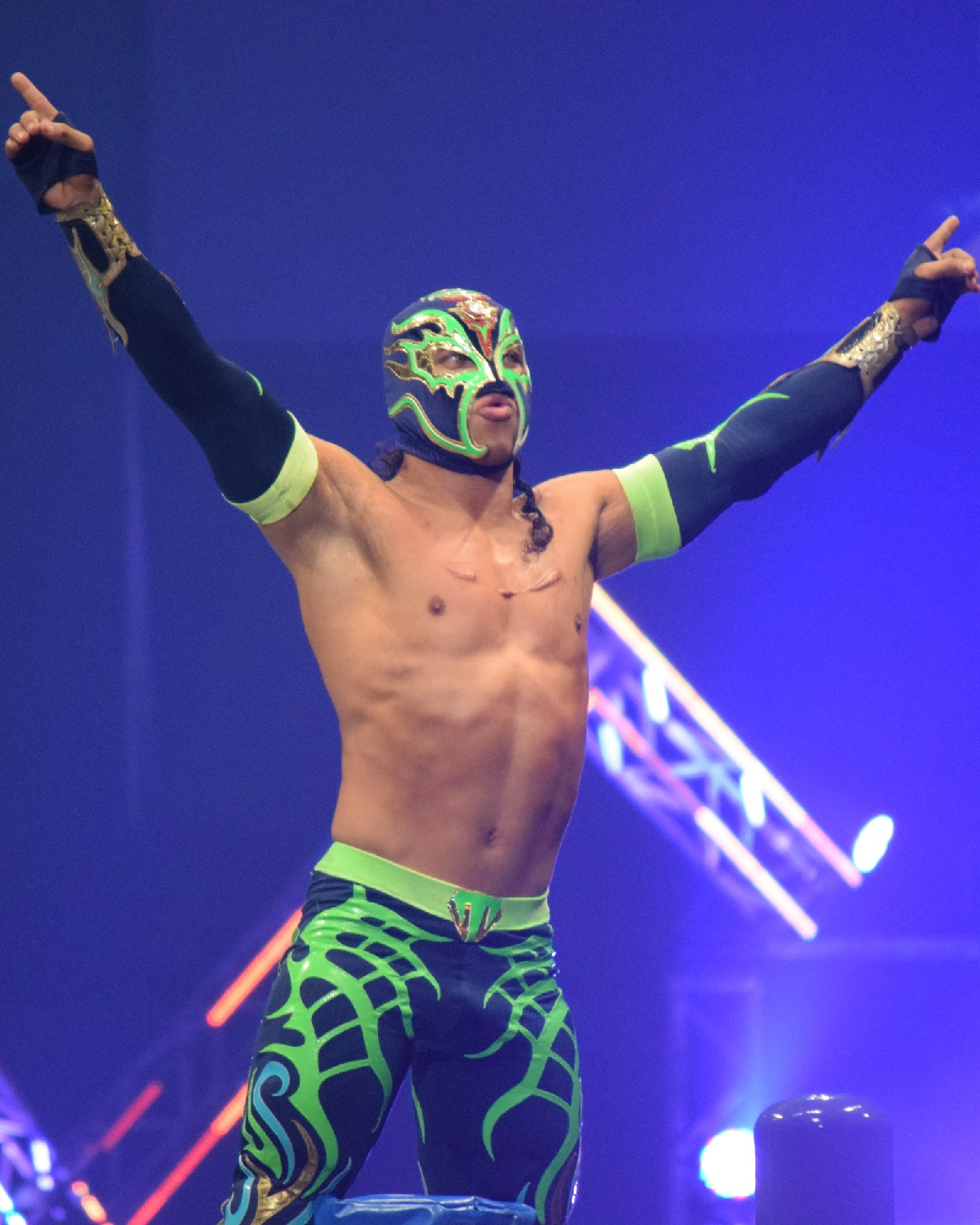
- Titán, winner of the tournament
- Promotion: Consejo Mundial de Lucha Libre
- Date: April 27, 2012 to May 25, 2012
- City: Mexico City, Mexico
- Venue: Arena México
- Tagline: "In search of an idol 2012"

Event chronology
| ← Previous; Torneo Gran Alternativa | Next →: 56. Aniversario de Arena México |

En Busca de un Ídolo chronology
| ← Previous; First | Next → 2013 |

The 2012 En Busca de un Ídolo (Spanish for "In search of an idol") was a professional wrestling tournament held by Mexican professional wrestling promotion Consejo Mundial de Lucha Libre (CMLL) and was the first tournament in what would become an annual tournament in CMLL. The purpose of the first tournament was to identify which of the 8 "Rookies" in the tournament would move up the ranks of the promotion. The tournament consisted of two rounds, first a round-robin tournament group round, with the top four point earners competing in an elimination tournament. Wrestlers could earn points in three ways, match results, judges points and points from an online poll available on the 'En Busca de un Ídolo website. The tournament ran from April 27 until May 25, 2012 and saw Titán win the tournament, partially due to a high number of fan votes.

== Tournament participants ==
The tournament featured eight professional wrestlers or luchadors, four of whom were tecnicos (the Lucha Libre term for someone who portrays a "good guy" character) and four who were rudos ("Bad Guys"). Being a professional wrestling tournament, the matches were not won legitimately through athletic competition; it is instead won via predetermined outcomes to the matches that is kept secret from the general public. Consejo Mundial de Lucha Libre (CMLL) held a press conference in early April, 2012 to announce the creation of the En Busca de un Ídolo, a tournament designed to focus on younger wrestlers, or in some cases masked wrestlers who had only worked under that ring persona for a relative short time. This was the third "Young wrestler" focused tournament CMLL had held within a year, with previous tournaments Forjando un Ídolo ("Forging an Idol") and Torneo Sangre Nueva ("New Blood") tournaments having a similar focus. The teams were divided by their rudo/tecnico status and the rudos only faced the tecnicos and vice versa. The technico team consisted of Diamante, Dragon Lee, Titán and Tritón, the team was coached by Atlantis and assisted by CMLL trainer Franco Colombo. The Rudo team consisted of Euforia, Niebla Roja, Pólvora and Puma King, the team was trained by Último Guerrero, assisted by CMLL trainer Tony Salazar. The top two point earners on each team would move on to the elimination part of the tournament. Initially the tournament matches were not shown on TV, they could only be seen on radiocmll.com and on CMLL's official YouTube channel. The matches were all taped and shown as part of a special "tournament/reality show" on Fox Sports International, starting September 29, 2012.

== Point system ==
Wrestlers could earn points in one of three ways

- Match results

- 20 Points for a victory
- 10 Points for a draw
- 0 points for a loss

- Judging

- The tournament also include four judges, referee El Tirantes, ring announcer Miguel Linares and wrestlers Maximo and Negro Casas. The judges could award up to 10 points each based on the way they portray their character, their personality, their charisma, and how much of a fan response they get during their matches.

- Online Poll

- The third way to earn points for the tournament was through an online poll conducted after each match on the En Busca de un Ídolo website. The online poll could give a wrestler a maximum of 40 additional points in the tournament each week.

== Prize ==
The winner of the tournament would be given the opportunity to main event the first CMLL Super Viernes show after the tournament ended to showcase their skills, they would also get the opportunity to work on the 2013 Fantastica Mania show, an event co-promoted by CMLL and New Japan Pro-Wrestling (NJPW) that takes place in Japan once a year, they would also receive a one-year membership to a Fitness club. Finally the winner would receive a title match for the CMLL World Middleweight Championship against champion Dragón Rojo Jr. at a later date. The top four finalists would get an all-expense-paid trip to Cancun.

== Tournament results ==
=== First round ===
Final score

| # | Wrestler: | Won | Loss | Draw | Total Points |
|---|---|---|---|---|---|
| 1 | Titán | 1 | 2 | 1 | 293 |
| 2 | Diamante | 3 | 1 | 0 | 238 |
| 3 | Eurforia | 3 | 1 | 0 | 236 |
| 4 | Dragon Lee | 3 | 1 | 0 | 229 |
| 5 | Niebla Roja | 1 | 2 | 1 | 226 |
| 6 | Puma King | 1 | 3 | 0 | 206 |
| 7 | Triton | 1 | 3 | 0 | 196 |
| 8 | Polvora | 2 | 2 | 0 | 165 |

=== Second round ===
The top four wrestlers moved on to the second round of the tournament, a round robin tournament where each competitor would wrestle in three matches, with the same point system in place as the first round. The matches took place exclusively on the Friday night Super Viernes shows and as the first round they could only be seen on radiocmll.com and on CMLL's official YouTube channel. CMLL held a special Trios team match where the coaches would team up with the four second round competitors on the May 25, 2012 Super Viernes show. Atlantis teamed up with Diamante and Dragon Lee to defeat Último Guerrero, Euforia and Titán. After the match Guerrero and Euforia attacked Titán, giving everyone a preview of their match in the second round.

The final matches of the second round took place on June 15, 2012. The first match saw Dragon Lee actually cost himself the match by disqualification when he did not release a submission hold when told to do so. Losing the match cost him 20 points. The other match was more notable for the change to the mask and trunk design change of Diamante than anything else. Diamante debut a new silver and black mask and trunks very reminiscent of Lucha libre legends El Santo and El Hijo del Santo.

Final score

| # | Wrestler: | Won | Loss | Draw | Match Points | Judges | Public Poll | Total Points |
|---|---|---|---|---|---|---|---|---|
| 1 | Titán | 3 | 2 | 0 | 40 points | 106 points | 120 points | 266 points |
| 2 | Euforia | 3 | 2 | 0 | 40 points | 88 points | 79 points | 207 points |
| 3 | Dragon Lee | 3 | 1 | 0 | 20 points | 97 points | 39 points | 156 points |
| 4 | Diamante | 3 | 1 | 0 | 20 points | 87 points | 20 points | 127 points |

=== Finals ===
The final of the En Busca de un Ídolo tournament came down to Titán and Euforia facing off in a one fall match with no time limit on the June 2, 2012 Super Viernes Show. Titán had coach Atlantis and trainer Franco Colombo in his corner while Eurforia had coach (and Los Guerreros del Infierno teammate) Último Guerrero and trainer Tony Salazar in his corner. Euforia started the match before Titán, trying to cheat his way to an easy victory. The two competitors worked a very high impact match, with Titán's mask being torn open in one place and the top of Euforia's mask being torn off completely. Titán pinned Euforia to win both the mask and the tournament. After the match All four finalist were awarded with trophies and flowers.

== Aftermath ==
CMLL held a Torneo cibernetico (Multi-man elimination match) on the July 6, 2012 Super Viernes Show that involved the En Busca de un Ídolo coaches Atlantis and Último Guerrero and seven of the eight participants, with Rey Cometa replacing Dragon Lee in the match. Último Guerrero was the last man standing in the match, lastly eliminating Titán with the help of Euforia.

Torneo Cibernetico order of elimination

| Order | Wrestler | Eliminated by |
|---|---|---|
| 1 | Rey Cometa | Puma King |
| 2 | Tritón | Euforia |
| 3 | Pólvora | Diamante |
| 4 | Puma King | Atlantis |
| 5 | Niebla Roja | Diamante |
| 6 | Diamante | Último Guerrero |
| 7 | Euforia | Titán |
| 8 | Atlantis | Último Guerrero |
| 9 | Titán | Último Guerrero |
| 10 | Último Guerrero | Winner |

One of the prizes that Titán won was a match for the CMLL World Middleweight Championship against champion Dragón Rojo Jr. Titán cashed in his prize on the July 21 Super Viernes Show, but was unsuccessful in the match. Titán would later defeat En Busca de un Ídolo rival Pólvora to win the Mexican National Welterweight Championship Titán also wrestled on all three of the Fanstatica Mania shows, winning one of his three matches.

Third place contestant Dragon Lee was announced as taking the ring character Místico ("The Mystic"), the successor of the original Místico who left CMLL to work in World Wrestling Entertainment as Sin Cara in 2011. Dragon Lee was referred to as Místico, La Nueva Era ("The new era").
