= Dralístico =

Mexican professional wrestler

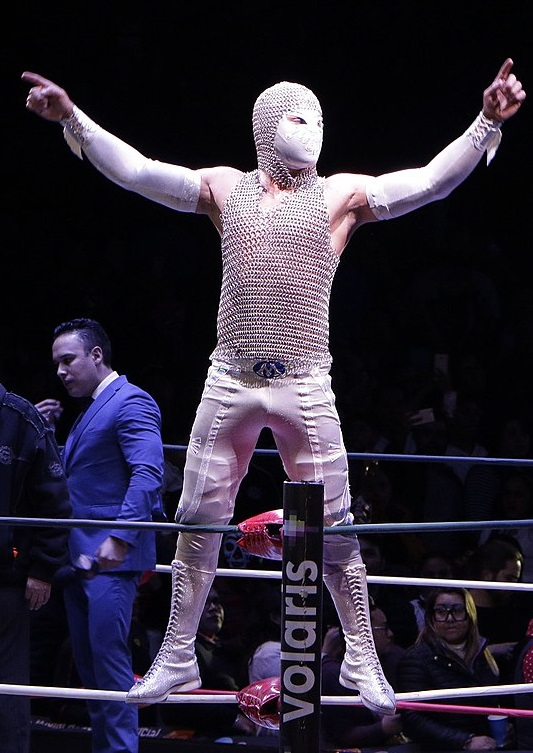
- Dralístico, as Místico, posing before a match in November 2018

Personal information
- Born: Carlos Muñoz González; 1991 (age 34–35) Tala, Jalisco, Mexico
- Parent: La Bestia del Ring (father)
- Family: Rush (brother); Dragon Lee (brother); Franco Columbo (uncle); Pitbull #1 (uncle); Pitbull #2 (uncle)

Professional wrestling career
- Ring names: Dragon Lee (I); Dralístico; Místico (II)
- Billed height: 1.75 m (5 ft 9 in)
- Billed weight: 76 kg (168 lb)
- Trained by: Arturo Beristain; Franco Columbo; Pitbull I; Pitbull II; Rush; Tony Salazar; La Bestia del Ring
- Debut: November 25, 2010

Carlos Muñoz González (born 1991), better known by his ring name Dralístico, (Note: The name is a portmanteau of his previous ring names "Dragon Lee" and "Místico".) is a Mexican professional wrestler. He is signed to American promotion All Elite Wrestling (AEW), where he is a member of La Facción Ingobernable. He also makes appearances for AEW's sister promotion Ring of Honor (ROH).

He is best known for his tenure with Consejo Mundial de Lucha Libre (CMLL), originally working as Dragon Lee before he was given the ring name and mask of Místico, after the original Místico left CMLL to work for WWE. He is a one-time CMLL World Tag Team Champion, two-time CMLL World Trios Champion, one-time CMLL World Welterweight Champion and the winner of the 2012 Torneo Sangre Nueva (as Dragon Lee) and 2016 Torneo Nacional de Parejas Increibles (with Mephisto). He has also wrestled for Lucha Libre AAA Worldwide (AAA), where he is a one-time AAA World Tag Team Champion, and the Japanese promotions New Japan Pro-Wrestling (NJPW) and Pro Wrestling Noah.

His father, Arturo Muñoz, is also a professional wrestler, known under the ring name La Bestia del Ring. Místico's older brother is better known under the ring name Rush. Místico and Rush's younger brother debuted in November 2013, the latter taking over the Dragon Lee ring name.

== Early life ==
Carlos Muñoz González was born in 1991 in Tala, in the Mexican state of Jalisco, the son of Arturo Muñoz Sánchez, a professional wrestler who used various ring names, including Toro Blanco, Poder Boriqua, Poder Mexico, Comandante Pierroth and La Bestia del Ring. Both Muñoz's older and younger brother would also grow up to become professional wrestlers, with the oldest of the brothers, William, making his wrestling debut in 2007 and later becoming known as "Rush". His younger brother made his debut in November 2013, adopting the name Dragon Lee that he had used early in his career. Muñoz's uncles are also professional wrestlers, known as Franco Columbo, Pit Bull I and Pit Bull II, and all had a hand in training him prior to his debut.

== Professional wrestling career ==
=== Consejo Mundial de Lucha Libre (2010–2021) ===
==== Dragon Lee (2010–2012) ====
Muñoz was originally trained in professional wrestling by his father Arturo Muñoz, brother Rush and uncles Franco Columbo, Pit Bull I and Pit Bull II. After two years of training, he moved to Mexico City to join Consejo Mundial de Lucha Libre (CMLL), undergoing further training under Arturo Beristain and Tony Salazar. Under a mask and the ring name Dragon Lee, he made his public debut on November 25, 2010, winning the beginner's category of CMLL's annual bodybuilding contest. He made his in-ring debut as a técnico on January 4, 2011, teaming with Fabián el Gitano and Starman in a loss to Arkangel de la Muerte, Boby Zavala and Skándalo. He was a member of the informal Generación 2011 group, which included wrestlers making their CMLL debuts around the same time.

On April 1, Lee was paired with veteran Volador Jr. in the Torneo Gran Alternativa ("Great Alternative Tournament"); they defeated Hombre Bala Jr. and La Máscara in the first round, but lost to Máscara Dorada and Metal Blanco in the quarter-finals. Lee then participated in the Forjando un Ídolo ("Forging an Idol") tournament, finishing fourth in his block with one win and two losses. On May 31, Lee participated in the semi-final torneo cibernetico of a tournament to determine the new CMLL World Super Lightweight Champion, eliminating Pegasso and Super Halcón Jr. before being eliminated by Tiger Kid. At the CMLL 78th Anniversary Show on September 30, he and Stuka Jr. lost to Euforia and Misterioso II. Lee unsuccessfully challenged Virus for the title on November 28. On March 20, 2012, Lee defeated Raziel to win the Torneo Sangre Nueva ("New Blood Tournament"). Ten days later, he and his brother Rush entered that year's Torneo Gran Alternativa, defeating Zavala and Rey Bucanero in the first round and Niebla Roja and Último Guerrero in the quarter-finals, but lost to El Terrible and Euforia in the semi-finals. Lee also finished third in the En Busca de un Ídolo ("In Search of an Idol") tournament/reality television show.

==== Místico (2012–2021) ====
Lee's tournament performance impressed wrestling priest Fray Tormenta who, on June 20, announced that he wanted Lee to take over the highly successful character of Místico, his storyline protégé. He immediately accepted the offer and became the second incarnation of Místico, embarking on a six-week publicity tour to promote the upcoming "new era" of Místico. Místico's in-ring debut occurred on August 3, as he, Ángel de Oro and Valiente defeated Euforia, Ephesto and Mephisto. The match caused a spike in attendance, drawing 12,600 fans to Arena México. At the CMLL 79th Anniversary Show on September 14, he, Atlantis and Prince Devitt lost to Dragón Rojo Jr., Guerrero and Negro Casas. On November 12, Místico was sidelined with an injury after failing to properly execute a shooting star press, landing on his shoulder. He returned to the ring on January 8, 2013, but suffered another shoulder injury the next day after a failed springboard dive. After returning on February 18, Místico and Averno won a ten-man torneo cibernetico on April 19 to determine who would face each other for the vacant Mexican National Welterweight Championship, with Averno defeating Místico for the title the following week.

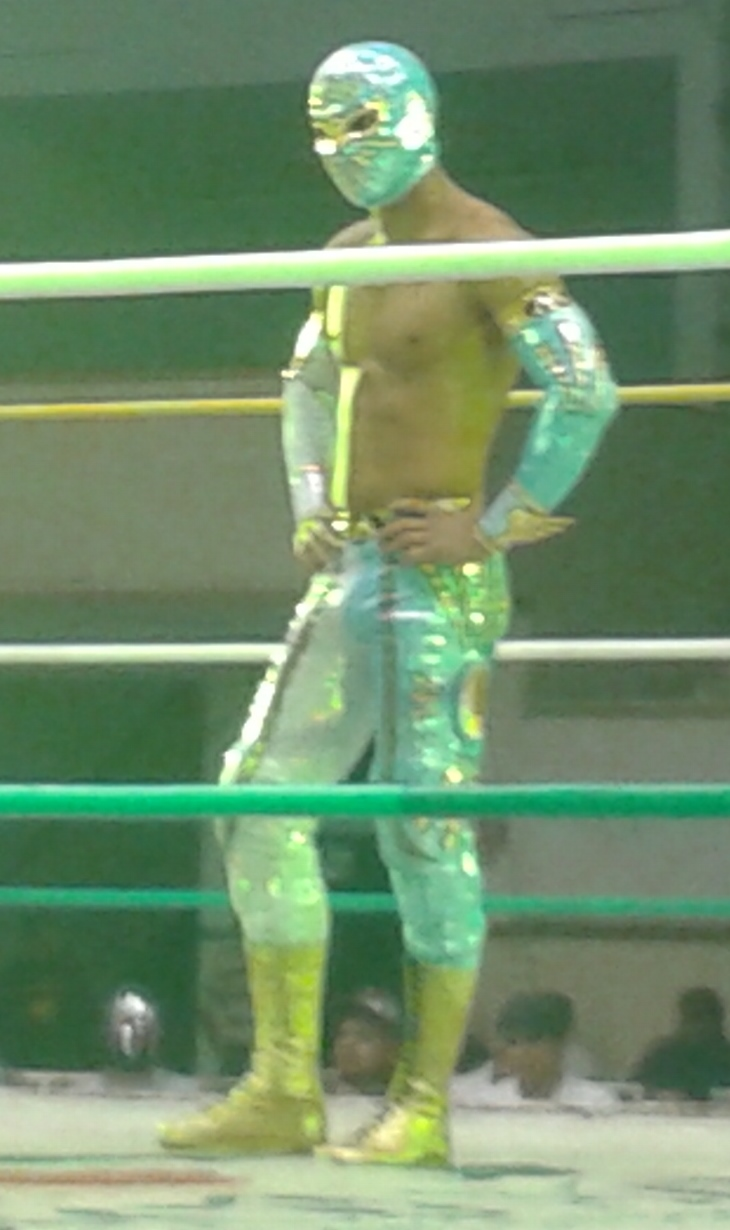
Místico in May 2013

In May, Místico, Dorada and Valiente formed the Los Estetas del Aire ("The Air Aesthetes") stable, defeating Los Guerreros Laguneros (Guerrero, Euforia and Roja) in a tournament final on June 9 to win the vacant CMLL World Trios Championship. This allowed Místico to compete in the Universal Championship tournament on August 23, defeating Pólvora in the first round before losing to Rey Escorpión in the quarter-finals. At the CMLL 80th Anniversary Show on September 13, they successfully defended the championship against Los Revolucionarios del Terror (Dragón Rojo Jr., Escorpión and Pólvora). On February 16, 2014, Místico defeated Pólvora for the CMLL World Welterweight Championship. He was forced to team with Psyco Ripper for the Torneo Nacional de Parejas Increíbles ("National Incredible Pairs Tournament") on March 7, defeating El Felino and Titán in the first round, but lost to Escorpión and Máximo in the quarter-finals. At Homenaje a Dos Leyendas ("Homage to Two Legends") on March 21, Los Estetas del Aire lost a non-title match to Los Guerreros Laguneros, who defeated them for the championship seven days later. On April 8, Místico successfully defended his title against Averno. On May 2, Místico broke both the fibula and tibia in his right leg in a motorcycle accident, forcing him to undergo surgery the following day. The injury was expected to sideline him for four months, leading to Místico vacating his championship on November 19.

Místico on the way to the ring for a match

On February 7, 2015, Místico, Valiente and Volador Jr. formed the new stable Sky Team, defeating Los Guerreros Laguneros the following week to win the CMLL World Trios Championship. At the CMLL 82nd Anniversary Show on September 18, he, Dragon Lee and Valiente defeated Casas, El Felino and Mr. Niebla. On March 18, 2016, he, Dorada, Lee and Valiente defeated Fujin, Kamaitachi, Okumura and Raijin at Homenaje a Dos Leyendas. Four days later, Místico and Tritón were paired for the Torneo Gran Alternativa, defeating Bucanero and El Cuatrero in the first round and Guerrero and Magia Blanca in the quarter-finals, before losing to Escorpión and Fujin in the semi-finals. Místico and Mephisto entered the Torneo Nacional de Parejas Increíbles on April 15, defeating Ángel de Oro and Pólvora, Marco Corleone and Rush and Mr. Niebla and Volador Jr. en route to the finals, which they won on April 29, defeating Carístico (the original Místico) and Cibernético. On July 11, he unsuccessfully challenged for Mephisto's CMLL World Welterweight Championship. At the CMLL 83rd Anniversary Show on September 2, Sky Team successfully defended their title against Los Guerreros Laguneros. On September 19, Místico and Volador Jr. unsuccessfully challenged Casas and Shocker for the CMLL World Tag Team Championship. He lost to Guerrero in the first round of that year's Universal Championship tournament on October 14. On November 1, he, Diamante Azul and Dorada failed to win the Mexican National Trios Championship from Los Hijos del Infierno (Ephesto, Luciferno and Mephisto).

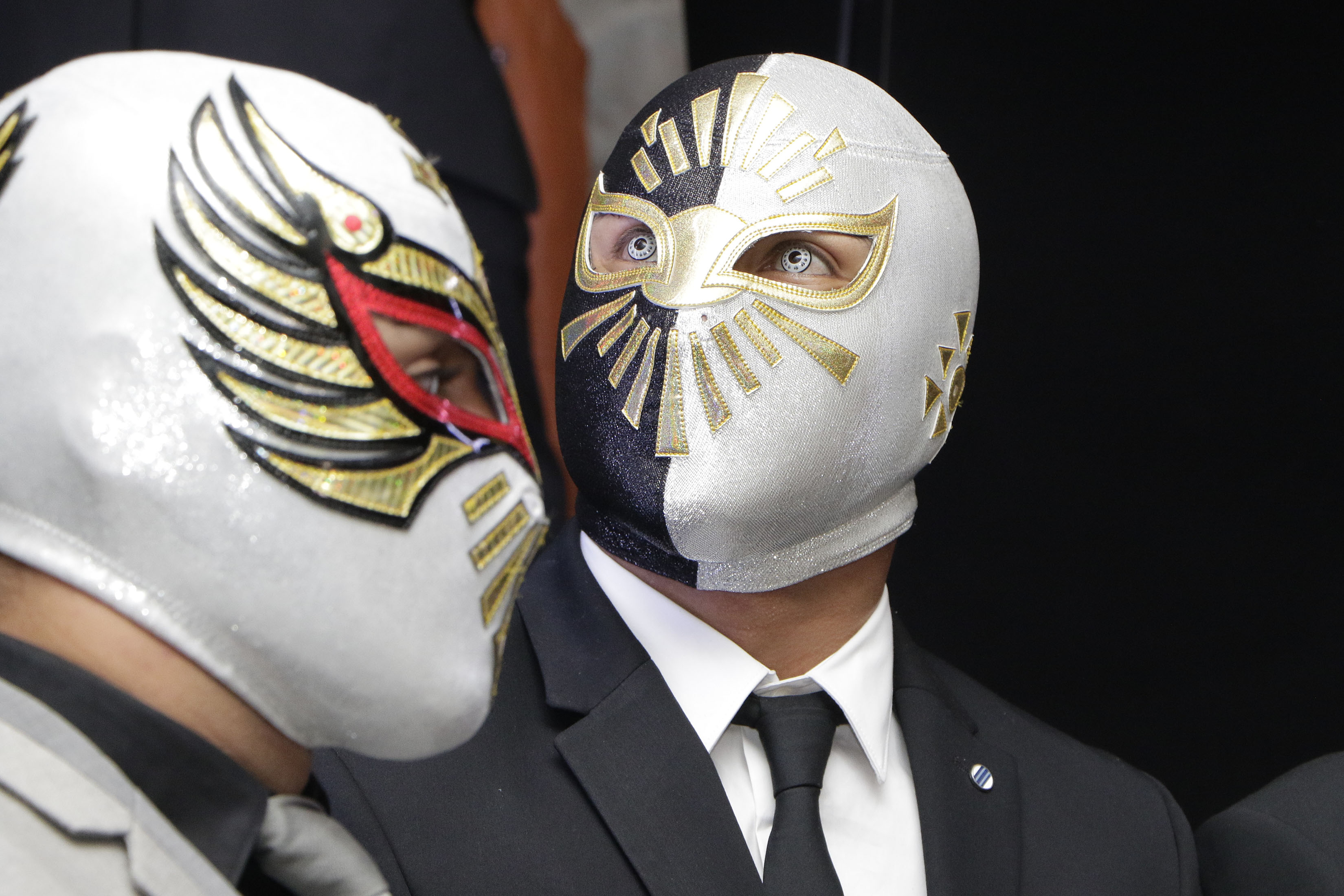
The original Místico (left) and then-current Místico (right), 2018

For the 2017 Torneo Nacional de Parejas Increíbles on February 17, Místico and Casas defeated Ripper and Titán in the first round, but lost to Guerrero and Valiente in the quarter-finals. Sky Team retained their title against Hechicero, Mephisto and Luciferno at Homenaje a Dos Leyendas on March 17. In that year's Universal Championship tournament on July 7, he defeated Mephisto in the first round, but lost to Roja in the quarter-finals. On November 24, Místico, Lee and Pierroth lost in the finals of the Copa Dinastías ("Dynasties Cup") tournament to Nueva Generación Dinamita (El Cuatrero, Forastero and Sansón). He and Mephisto reunited for the Torneo Nacional de Parejas Increíbles on February 2, 2018, defeating Hechicero and Soberano Jr. and Gran Guerrero and Roja before losing to Último Guerrero and Volador Jr. in the semi-finals. At Homenaje a Dos Leyendas on March 16, he, Lee and Rush defeated Forastero, Máscara Año 2000 and Sansón. Sky Team lost the CMLL World Trios Championship to Los Guerreros Laguneros on July 1. At the CMLL 85th Anniversary Show on September 14, he, Atlantis and Soberano Jr. lost to Nueva Generación Dinamita. Místico and rival El Cuatrero were paired for the Torneo Nacional de Parejas Increíbles on April 19, 2019, defeating Hechicero and Stuka Jr. in the first round and Atlantis and Casas in the quarter-finals, before losing to Guerrero and Volador Jr. in the semi-finals. At the CMLL 86th Anniversary Show on September 27, he, Carístico and Valiente unsuccessfully challenged Nueva Generación Dinamita for the Mexican National Trios Championship. Místico and Fugaz entered the Torneo Gran Alternativa on October 4; they defeated Arkalis and Stuka Jr. in the first round, Difunto and Guerrero in the quarter-finals and Dulce Gardenia and Volador Jr. in the semi-finals, but lost to Star Jr. and Valiente in the finals on October 18.

At Día de Muertos ("Day of the Dead") on November 1, Mistico and Carístico defeated Euforia and Gran Guerrero for the CMLL World Tag Team Championship, successfully defending it against El Cuatrero and Forastero at Sin Piedad ("No Mercy") on January 1, 2020. At the CMLL 87th Anniversary Show on September 25, they retained the title against Espíritu Negro and Rey Cometa. Mistico and Guerrero teamed in the Torneo Nacional de Parejas Increíbles on June 11, 2021, defeating Atlantis and Casas in the first round, but lost to Dragón Rojo Jr. and Titán in the quarter-finals. He participated in the Leyenda de Plata ("The Silver Legend") tournament on July 16, defeating Negro in the first round and Mephisto in the quarter-finals, but lost to Templario in the semi-finals. On August 25, Místico announced his departure from CMLL and would be known as Dralístico going forward (a portmanteau of his previous ring names).

=== New Japan Pro-Wrestling (2013–2019) ===
On November 12, 2012, New Japan Pro-Wrestling (NJPW) announced that Místico would be making his Japanese debut at Fantastica Mania 2013 in January 2013. On January 15, NJPW announced that Místico would be unable to wrestle at the Fantastica Mania events due to a dislocated shoulder, but would still attend them to sign autographs. Three nights later, Místico appeared on the first show of the weekend, greeting the fans in attendance at Korakuen Hall.

During the opening event of the Fantastica Mania 2014 tour on January 14, 2014, Místico made his Japanese in-ring debut, teaming with El Desperado and Hiroshi Tanahashi to defeat Kazuchika Okada, Mephisto and Rey Escorpión. Four days later, he unsuccessfully challenged Mephisto for the Mexican National Light Heavyweight Championship. Following an injury, Místico returned to the ring during the first show of the Fantastica Mania 2015 tour on January 13, 2015, working the entire tour opposite Pólvora. Four days later, he and Tritón lost to Mephisto and Pólvora in the first round of a tag team tournament. He concluded the tour by defeating Pólvora in a singles match on January 19. In January 2016 and 2017, Místico respectively wrestled on the Fantastica Mania 2016 and Fantastica Mania 2017 tours. During the Fantastica Mania 2018 tour in January 2018, he and Dragon Lee competed in the "brothers tag team tournament", defeating El Cuatrero and Sansón in the first round before losing to Último Guerrero and Gran Guerrero in the finals. The following year, during the Fantastica Mania 2019 tour, Místico and Lee, after defeating Flyer and Volador Jr., defeated El Cuatrero and Sansón to win the family tag team tournament.

=== Ring of Honor (2017) ===
In August 2017, Místico made his Ring of Honor (ROH) debut for the CMLL/NJPW/ROH/RevPro-promoted War of the Worlds UK tour. During the first event on August 18, Místico, Delirious and Jushin Thunder Liger unsuccessfully challenged Dalton Castle and The Boys for the ROH World Six-Man Tag Team Championship.

=== Lucha Libre AAA Worldwide (2021–2023) ===
Dralístico celebrating with a fan in April 2024

After leaving CMLL, Dralístico joined La Facción Ingobernable alongside his father and brothers. Dralístico made his debut for Lucha Libre AAA Worldwide (AAA) on October 9, 2021, at Héroes Inmortales XIV, where he and Dragon Lee challenged Los Lucha Bros (Fénix and Pentagón Jr.) for the AAA World Tag Team Championship. At Triplemanía Regia II on December 4, they defeated Laredo Kid and Willie Mack. Dralístico lost to Pentagón Jr. at Rey de Reyes ("King of Kings") on February 19, 2022. At Triplemanía XXX on October 15, they defeated the teams of Arez and Mack, Komander and Myzteziz Jr. and Los Vipers (Látigo and Toxin) to become the number one contenders for the title.

On December 28, at Noche de Campeones ("Night of Champions"), Dralístico and Lee defeated FTR (Cash Wheeler and Dax Harwood) to win the AAA World Tag Team Championship, but vacated it in January 2023 upon Lee's signing with WWE. At Triplemanía XXXI on August 12, Dralístico was involved in a four-way match for the vacant AAA Latin American Championship, which was won by Q. T. Marshall. At Héroes Inmortales on October 1, he and La Bestia del Ring defeated El Hijo del Vikingo and Myzteziz Jr. Dralístico unsuccessfully challenged El Hijo del Vikingo for the AAA Mega Championship at Guerra de Titanes ("War of the Titans") on November 19. On December 5, Dralístico announced that he had left AAA and would be working as an independent talent in Mexico.

=== All Elite Wrestling / Ring of Honor (2022–present) ===
Dralístico returned to ROH, now the sister promotion of AAA's U.S. partner promotion All Elite Wrestling (AEW), at Final Battle on December 10, 2022, where he and La Facción Ingobernable stablemate Rush lost to AR Fox and Blake Christian. At Supercard of Honor on March 31, 2023, they took part in a "Reach for the Sky" ladder match for the vacant ROH World Tag Team Championship, which was won by the Lucha Brothers. On April 7, at Battle of the Belts VI, he unsuccessfully challenged Orange Cassidy for the AEW International Championship. Dralístico failed to win El Hijo del Vikingo's AAA Mega Championship on the April 22 and May 26 (in a three-way match also involving Komander) episodes of Rampage. In November, Dralístico officially signed with AEW to a four-year deal. At Full Gear on November 18, he and Rush failed to win a four-way tag team ladder match for the AEW World Tag Team Championship.

On September 28, 2024, on the Collision edition of Grand Slam, Dralístico and The Beast Mortos lost to Hologram in a three-way match. After the match, he, Mortos and Rush attacked Hologram, with Mortos subsequently joining LFI. On the April 26, 2025 episode of Collision, he unsuccessfully challenged Bandido for the ROH World Championship. At Death Before Dishonor Zero Hour on August 29, he defeated Adam Priest, Angélico and Fox in a $50,000 four-way match. Dralístico and his LFI stablemates unsuccessfully challenged The Opps (Katsuyori Shibata, Powerhouse Hobbs and Samoa Joe) for the AEW World Trios Championship on the October 15 episode of Dynamite. The following month, it was reported that Dralístico had suffered an ear injury in two different matches, forcing him to undergo surgery. He returned from injury on the March 7, 2026 episode of Collision. At Revolution on March 15, Dralístico participated in a Blackjack Battle Royal for the AEW National Championship, but was eliminated by Shibata. On the June 6 episode of Collision, LFI failed to win the AEW World Trios Championship from The Conglomeration (Kyle O'Reilly, Cassidy and Roderick Strong).

=== Pro Wrestling Noah (2023) ===
Dralístico made his Pro Wrestling Noah debut at Great Voyage in Osaka on February 12, 2023, defeating Atsushi Kotoge. At Green Journey in Sendai on April 16, he, Alejandro and Dragon Bane defeated Alpha Wolf and Lanzeloth in a 3-on-2 handicap match. After defeating Rey Escorpión at Majestic on May 4, Dralístico made his final appearance on July 15, as he, AMAKUSA and Ninja Mack defeated Dante Leon, Escorpión and HAYATA.

== Other media ==
In 2011, as Místico, he was featured in the second season of a A&E Latinoamericano documentary series titled El Luchador, alongside fellow CMLL wrestlers El Felino, Rey Bucanero and Shocker.

== Championships and accomplishments ==
- Consejo Mundial de Lucha Libre
  - CMLL World Tag Team Championship (1 time) – with Carístico
  - CMLL World Trios Championship (2 times) – with Máscara Dorada and Valiente (1) and Valiente and Volador Jr. (1)
  - CMLL World Welterweight Championship (1 time)
  - CMLL Bodybuilding Contest – Beginners (2010)
  - Copa 60 Aniversario de la Arena Puebla (2013)
  - Torneo Nacional de Parejas Increíbles (2016) – with Mephisto
  - Torneo Sangre Nueva (2012)
- Kaoz Lucha Libre
  - Kaoz Tag Team Championship (1 time) - with Dragon Lee
- Lucha Libre Azteca
  - Azteca Championship (1 time)
- Lucha Libre AAA Worldwide
  - AAA World Tag Team Championship (1 time) - with Dragon Lee
- New Japan Pro-Wrestling
  - Torneo de Parejas Familiares (2019) – with Dragon Lee
- Pro Wrestling Illustrated
  - Ranked No. 119 of the top 500 singles wrestlers in the PWI 500 in 2021
- Pro Wrestling Revolution
  - PWR Tag Team Championship (1 time) - with Dragon Lee
- The Crash Lucha Libre
  - The Crash Tag Team Championship (1 time) - with Dragon Lee
