= En Busca de un Ídolo 2014 =

2014 Consejo Mundial de Lucha Libre event

- Poster advertising the June 20 finale
- Promotion: Consejo Mundial de Lucha Libre (CMLL)
- Date: March 25, 2014 to June 20, 2014
- City: Mexico City, Mexico
- Venue: Arena México
- Tagline: "In search of an idol 2014"

Event chronology
← Previous; Homenaje a Dos Leyendas	Next → Reyes del Aire

En Busca de un Ídolo chronology
← Previous; 2013	Next → 2015

CMLL held their third annual En Busca de un Ídolo ("In Search of an Idol") in 2014 starting on March 25 and running until June 20. All tournament matches took place in CMLL's main building, Arena México on Tuesdays and Fridays for the first round and exclusively on Fridays during CMLL's Super Viernes for the second round. Like the first tournament the 2014 version focused on a group of young wrestlers trying to prove themselves to both CMLL and the fans. The first round of the tournament was a Round-robin tournament format between eight wrestlers, scoring points based on victories, judges assessments and an online poll. The second round included the top four winners of round one, once again in a round-robin tournament with points. The final match featured the top two point earners in a match against each other, with the winner taking the trophy and prize. In the end Cavernario defeated Hechicero to win the entire tournament.

== Tournament Prize ==
The winner of the tournament would be given the opportunity to work on the 2015 Fantastica Mania show, an event co-promoted by CMLL and New Japan Pro-Wrestling (NJPW) that takes place in Japan once a year. The winner would also receive a title match for the Mexican National Welterweight Championship against champion Titán at a later date.

== Participants ==
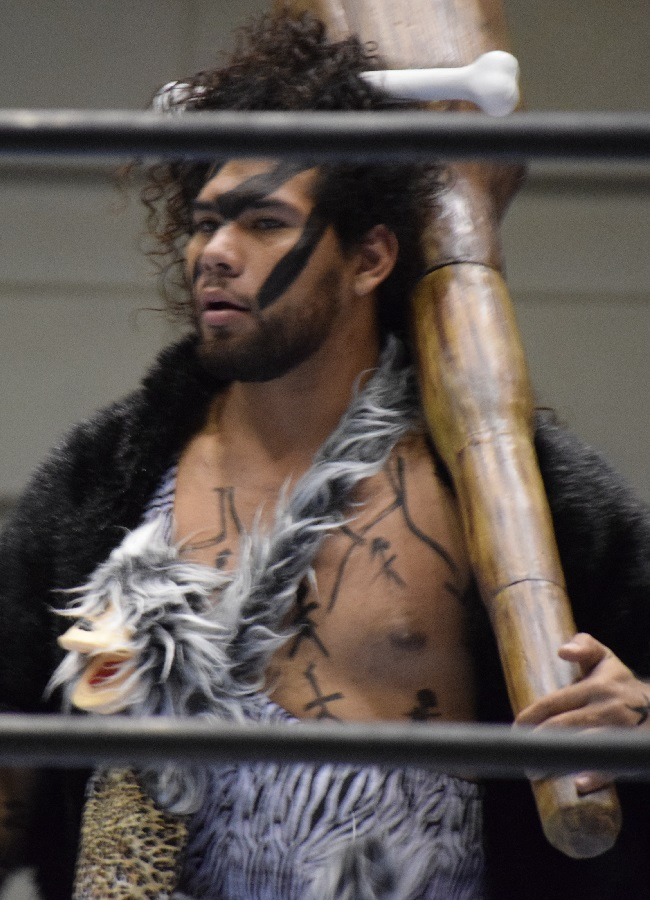
Bárbaro Cavernario, won the 2014 version of the tournament.

The 2014 tournament began with a 16-man Torneo cibernetico elimination match, where the first 8 wrestlers eliminated from the match would not move on to the Round-robin tournament portion of the show. The match took place on March 25, 2014 and saw Black Panther, Canelo Casas, El Rebelde, Espiritu Negro, Flyer, Herodes Jr., Metálico and Oro Jr. from the tournament. The eight finalist were randomly split into two teams, each given their own coach, Negro Casas and Virus.

Team Negro Casas

- Cachorro
- Cavernario
- Dragon Lee
- Soberano Jr.

Team Virus

- Guerrero Negro Jr.
- Hechicero
- Star Jr.
- Super Halcón Jr.

Judges

- Mr. Niebla
- Shocker
- El Tirantes
- 4th Judge changed from week to week

== Round one ==
Round 1	Cachorro	Cavernario	Dragon Lee	Guerrero Negro Jr.	Hechicero	Soberano Jr.	Star Jr.	Super Halcón Jr.
Cachorro	X	Cachorro	Dragon Lee	Guerrero Negro Jr.	Cachorro	Soberano Jr.	Cachorro	Cachorro
Cavernario	Cachorro	X	Cavernario	Cavernario	Hechicero	Cavernario	Cavernario	Cavernario
Dragon Lee	Dragon Lee	Cavernario	X	Dragon Lee	Draw	Dragon Lee	Star Jr.	Dragon Lee
Guerrero Negro Jr.	Guerrero Negro Jr.	Cavernario	Dragon Lee	X	Guerrero Negro Jr.	Guerrero Negro Jr.	Star Jr.	Super Halcón Jr.
Hechicero	Cavernario	Hechicero	Draw	Guerrero Negro Jr.	X	Soberano Jr.	Hechicero	Hechicero
Soberano Jr.	Soberano Jr.	Cavernario	Dragon Lee	Guerrero Negro Jr.	Soberano Jr.	X	Star Jr.	Super Halcón Jr.
Star Jr.	Cachorro	Cavernario	Star Jr.	Star Jr.	Hechicero	Star Jr.	X	Super Halcón Jr.
Super Halcón Jr.	Cachorro	Cavernario	Dragon Lee	Super Halcón Jr.	Hechicero	Super Halcón Jr.	Super Halcón Jr.	X

Overall standings

Rank	Name	Points
1	Hechicero	565
2	Cavernario	451
3	Cachorro	433
4	Dragon Lee	423
5	Star Jr.	406
6	Soberano Jr.	395
7	Super Halcón Jr.	339
8	Guerrero Negro Jr.	336

== Round two ==
On May 23, 2014 the four finalists and their trainers faced off in a six-man tag team match. Since Virus only had one of his team members advance CMLL moved Cachorro to his team with Virus, Cachorro and Hechicero defeating Negro Casas, Cavernario and Dragon Lee in a preview of the second round.

Round 2	Cachorro	Cavernario	Dragon Lee	Hechicero
Cachorro	X	Cachorro	Dragon Lee	Hechicero
Cavernario	Cachorro	X	Cavernario	Cavernario
Dragon Lee	Dragon Lee	Cavernario	X	Hechicero
Hechicero	Hechicero	Cavernario	Hechicero	X

Overall standings

Rank	Name	Points
1	Hechicero	250
2	Cavernario	202
3	Dragon Lee	198
4	Cachorro	195

== Finals and aftermath ==
The finals took place on June 20, 2014 between the two top point earners, Hechicero and Cavernario. Hechicero had been the point leader throughout both rounds of the tournament, largely due to the fan votes, lost to Cavernario two falls to one. The following week Negro Casas, Virus and the 8 tournament competitors faced off in a Torneo cibernetico elimination match that saw Negro eliminate Virus to win the match. On July 27, 2014 Cavernario cashed in one of his tournament prizes as he faced Titán for the Mexican National Welterweight Championship, but lost.
