= Ángel de Oro =

Mexican professional wrestler (born 1988)

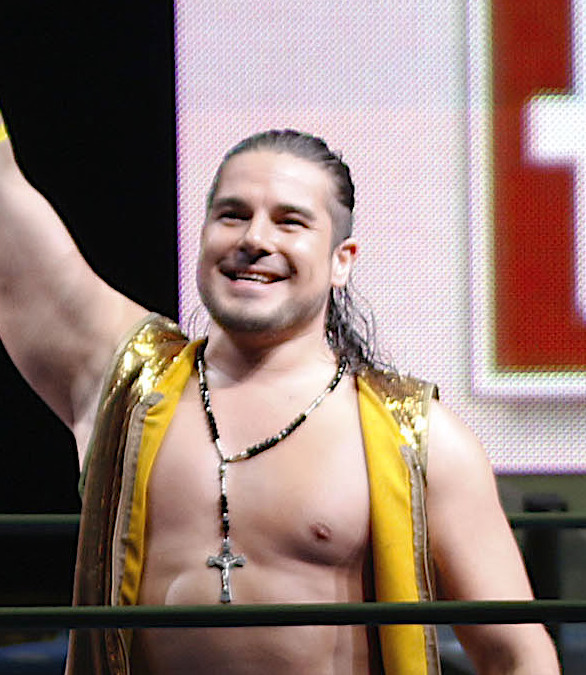
- Ángel de Oro in July 2020

Personal information
- Born: Miguel Ángel Chávez Velasco; August 18, 1988 (age 38) Torreón, Coahuila, Mexico
- Family: Apolo Chávez (father); Niebla Roja (brother)

Professional wrestling career
- Ring name: Ángel de Oro
- Billed height: 1.76 m (5 ft 9 1/2 in)
- Billed weight: 82 kg (181 lb)
- Billed from: Gómez Palacio, Durango, Mexico
- Trained by: Gran Cochisse; El Satánico; Franco Columbo; Diabólico; Corsario Rojo
- Debut: 2005

Miguel Ángel Chávez Velasco (born August 18, 1988), better known by his ring name Ángel de Oro (Spanish for "Angel of Gold" or "Golden Angel"), is a Mexican professional wrestler. He is signed to Consejo Mundial de Lucha Libre (CMLL), where he is one-half of the current CMLL World Tag Team Champions in his first reign.

A second-generation wrestler, Chávez is the son of retired wrestler Apolo Chávez, and the brother of Sergio Raymundo Chávez Velasco, who is also a professional wrestler under the ring name Niebla Roja. His accolades in CMLL include being a former CMLL World Middleweight Champion, CMLL World Light Heavyweight Champion, Mexican National Trios Champion, Mexican National Light Heavyweight Champion and Strong Openweight Tag Team Champion. He has won several tournaments, including the Reyes del Aire three times, the 2011 Forjando un Ídolo, the 2020 Leyenda de Azul, the 2021 La Copa Junior VIP and the 2022 Copa Independencia. Through CMLL's partnerships, has also wrestled in Japan for New Japan Pro-Wrestling (NJPW), and in the United States for Ring of Honor (ROH).

== Professional wrestling career ==
=== Early career (2005–2008) ===
Chávez and his older brother, Niebla Roja, are the sons of professional wrestler Apolo Chávez and grew up idolizing their father. Ángel de Oro was trained for his professional wrestling debut by Dibólico and Corsario Rojo, receiving further training from Gran Cochisse, El Satánico and Franco Columbo later in his career. He initially worked mainly for independent promotions around the Gómez Palacio, Durango area, often while feuding with his brother who, at the time, wrestled as Guerrero Inca ("Incan Warrior"). It was the feud between the two brothers that got Ángel de Oro noticed by Consejo Mundial de Lucha Libre (CMLL) talent scouts, landing him a contract with CMLL. His brother changed his ring character to Ángel de Plata ("Silver Angel") to complement his younger brother's ring character, and together they began training at CMLL's wrestling school in Guadalajara, Jalisco.

=== Consejo Mundial de Lucha Libre (2008–present) ===
==== Early years (2008–2011) ====
The duo made their CMLL debut on July 4, 2008, wrestling as a team dubbed Los Angeles Celestiales ("The Celestial Angels"). They became a trio after being joined by Ángel Azteca Jr., who used a similar ring character. On April 7, 2009, Ángel de Oro participated in a ten-man torneo cibernetico for the vacant CMLL World Super Lightweight Championship, involving Ángel Azteca Jr., Rey Cometa, Pegasso, Tiger Kid, Pólvora, Inquisidor, Súper Comando, Angel de Plata and eventual winner Máscara Dorada. Later that year, Ángel de Oro was paired with Místico, CMLL's most popular wrestler at the time, for the Torneo Gran Alternativa ("Great Alternative Tournament"), where an experienced wrestler teams up with a newcomer; they were considered the favorite for the tournament. After defeating Atlantis and Camorra and Mr. Niebla and Tiger Kid, they lost in the finals to Okumura and Yujiro. On October 18, Ángel de Oro was one of twelve wrestlers risking their mask in a steel cage Lucha de Apuestas ("bet match"), but kept it safe as the tenth and last person to escape the cage. Los Ángeles Celestiales then lost in the first round to Los Cancerberos del Infierno (Euforia, Pólvora and Virus) in a tournament to crown new Mexican National Trios Champions, beginning a rivalry between the two groups, who faced off on various CMLL shows, including Super Viernes.

In early 2010, Ángel de Oro was voted "Newcomer of the year" by CMLL and Súper Luchas Magazine. On March 19, he, Fuego and Stuka Jr. lost to Poder Mexica (Dragón Rojo Jr., Misterioso II and Sangre Azteca) in the opening match of Homenaje a Dos Leyendas ("Homage to Two Legends"). He was one of twelve men who put their mask on the line in a steel cage match in the main event of Infierno en el Ring ("Inferno in the Ring") on July 18, which saw his brother, Ángel de Plata, trick him in order to escape the cage. Eventually, Ángel de Oro and Fabián were the last two wrestlers in the ring, with Ángel de Oro winning his first Lucha de Apuestas by pinning Fabián, forcing him to unmask and reveal his name, per lucha libre traditions. On August 15, Ángel de Oro represented Mexico City in a "Mexico City vs. Guadalajara" torneo cibernetico between young wrestlers trained at CMLL's wrestling school in Mexico and young wrestlers trained at CMLL's facility in Guadalajara. Ángel de Oro won the match for Mexico City after Guadalajara-trained Ángel del Mal (not related to Ángel de Oro and Ángel de Plata) betrayed his "home town" by costing Metal Blanco the match. On September 3, Ángel de Oro, Delta and Stuka Jr. defeated Los Guerreros Tuareg (Arkangel de la Muerte and Skándalo) and Pólvora at the CMLL 77th Anniversary Show. Up until the end of 2010, CMLL rarely promoted the fact that Ángel de Oro and Ángel de Plata were second-generation wrestlers, but acknowledged it when they both competed in the La Copa Junior ("The Junior Cup") tournament on December 25; Ángel de Oro lost to Negro Casas in the first round.

==== Championship reigns (2011–2018) ====
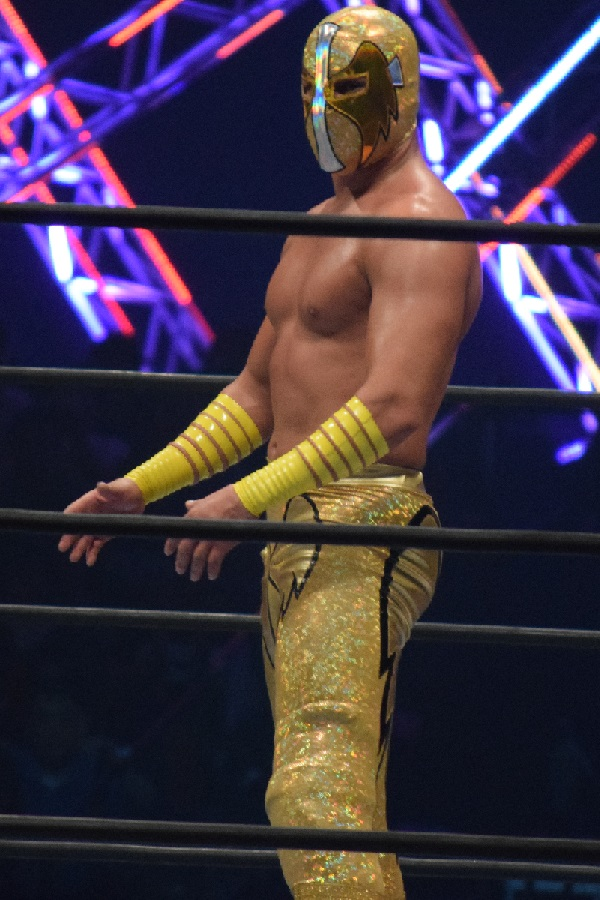
Ángel de Oro in November 2016

On January 1, 2011, Ángel de Oro won the Reyes del Aire ("Kings of the Air") tournament, lastly eliminating Virus. Eight days later, he, Diamante and Rush defeated Delta, Metro and Stuka Jr. to win the Mexican National Trios Championship. The following month, he was forced to team with rudo Último Guerrero in the Torneo Nacional de Parejas Increibles ("National Incredible Pairs Tournament"), where they defeated El Terrible and Toscano in the first round, but lost to Blue Panther and Dragón Rojo Jr. in the quarter-finals. Over the spring, Ángel de Oro was one of sixteen competitors in the inaugural Forjando un Ídolo ("Forging an Idol") tournament, designed to showcase some of CMLL's younger, lower ranked wrestlers and elevate one or more of them up the ranks. In the first round, he defeated Rey Escorpión, Palacio Negro and Cometa to earn nine points and win for his group, qualifying for the second round, where he defeated Fuego and Guerrero Maya Jr. to qualify for the finals; he then defeated Pólvora to win the tournament. On July 29, he was the third wrestler eliminated by Rey Bucanero in the Leyenda de Azul ("The Blue Legend") tournament.

By virtue of holding a championship, Ángel de Oro competed in the Universal Championship tournament, but lost to La Sombra in the opening round on September 2. On September 20, he, Diamante and Rush lost their championship to Los Invasores (Olímpico, Psicosis II and Volador Jr.). On February 3, 2012, Ángel de Oro won the Reyes del Aire back-to-back, becoming the first wrestler to ever do so. For the Torneo Nacional de Parejas Increibles later that month, he and Psicosis defeated El Felino and Bucanero in the first round, but lost to El Terrible and Rush in the quarter-finals. On April 29 and September 2, Ángel de Oro unsuccessfully challenged Casas for the NWA World Historic Welterweight Championship. Casas also eliminated him during the La Copa Junior on November 30, leading to a third title match on December 11, where Casas again defeated Ángel de Oro. In early 2013, he failed to win the Torneo Nacional de Parejas Increibles with Ephesto. In December of that year, Ángel de Oro suffered a severe knee injury during a six-man tag team match, requiring him to have surgery and spend several months out of the ring rehabilitating his knee.

Ángel de Oro returned from injury on June 2, 2014, defeating Escorpión on October 28 to win the CMLL World Light Heavyweight Championship. On February 7, 2015, as part of the Torneo Nacional de Parejas Increibles, Ángel de Oro was paired with Hechicero, who had been requesting a title match in the weeks before the tournament, but lost to Atlantis and Guerrero in the opening round. Throughout the year, he successfully defended the title against the likes of Gran Guerrero, Ripper and Pólvora. On October 2, Ángel de Oro lost to Shocker in the first round of the Universal Championship tournament. At Homenaje a Dos Leyendas on March 18, 2016, he, Cometa and Titán lost to Los Hijos del Averno (Ephesto, Luciferno and Mephisto). On April 8, Ángel de Oro lost the title to La Máscara, ending his reign at 528 days. The following week, he and Pólvora lost to Mephisto and Místico in the first round of the Torneo Nacional de Parejas Increíbles. On May 21, Ángel de Oro entered a torneo cibernetico to determine the first Lucha Libre Elite Middleweight Champion, which was won by Caristico.

On March 25, 2017, Ángel de Oro defeated Dragón Rojo Jr. to win the CMLL World Middleweight Championship, ending his over five-year long reign as champion. The following month, he won his third Reyes del Aire. On June 29, he and Oro Jr. lost to Carístico and Soberano Jr. in the first round of that year's Torneo Gran Alternativa. On January 19, 2018, at Fantastica Mania 2018, Ángel de Oro lost the championship to El Cuatrero, as part of an ongoing storyline feud between the two. They were paired for the Torneo Nacional de Parejas Increíbles, losing to Atlantis and Mr. Niebla in the first round on February 9. Their storyline culminated in a mask vs. mask Lucha de Apuestas at Homenaje a Dos Leyendas on March 16, where Ángel de Oro lost to El Cuatrero, being forced to remove his mask and publicly reveal his birth name, Miguel Ángel Chávez Velasco. On June 1 and July 16, he unsuccessfully challenged El Cuatrero for the championship.

==== Los Hermanos Chavez and Los Nuevos Ingobernables (2018–present) ====
During the feud with El Cuatrero, Ángel de Oro resumed his partnership with Niebla Roja as Los Hermanos Chavez. At the CMLL 86th Anniversary Show on September 14, they teamed with Audaz to defeat La Peste Negra (El Felino and Casas) and Mephisto. The Universal Championship was the start of a storyline between Los Hermanos Chavez and Los Ingobernables (El Terrible and La Bestia del Ring), as El Terrible cheated to defeat Roja with La Bestia del Ring's help. Eventually, they all signed a contract for a Lucha de Apuestas in the main event of Homenaje a Dos Leyendas on March 15, 2019, where Los Hermanos Chavez defeated Los Ingobernables, forcing both El Terrible and La Bestia del Ring to have all their hair shaved off. On April 12, Ángel de Oro and La Bestia del Ring lost to Euforia and Guerrero Maya Jr. in the first round of the Torneo Nacional de Parejas Increíbles. He, Roja and Mephisto defeated Los Guerreros Laguneros (Euforia and Gran Guerrero) and Soberano Jr. at the CMLL 86th Anniversary Show on September 27.

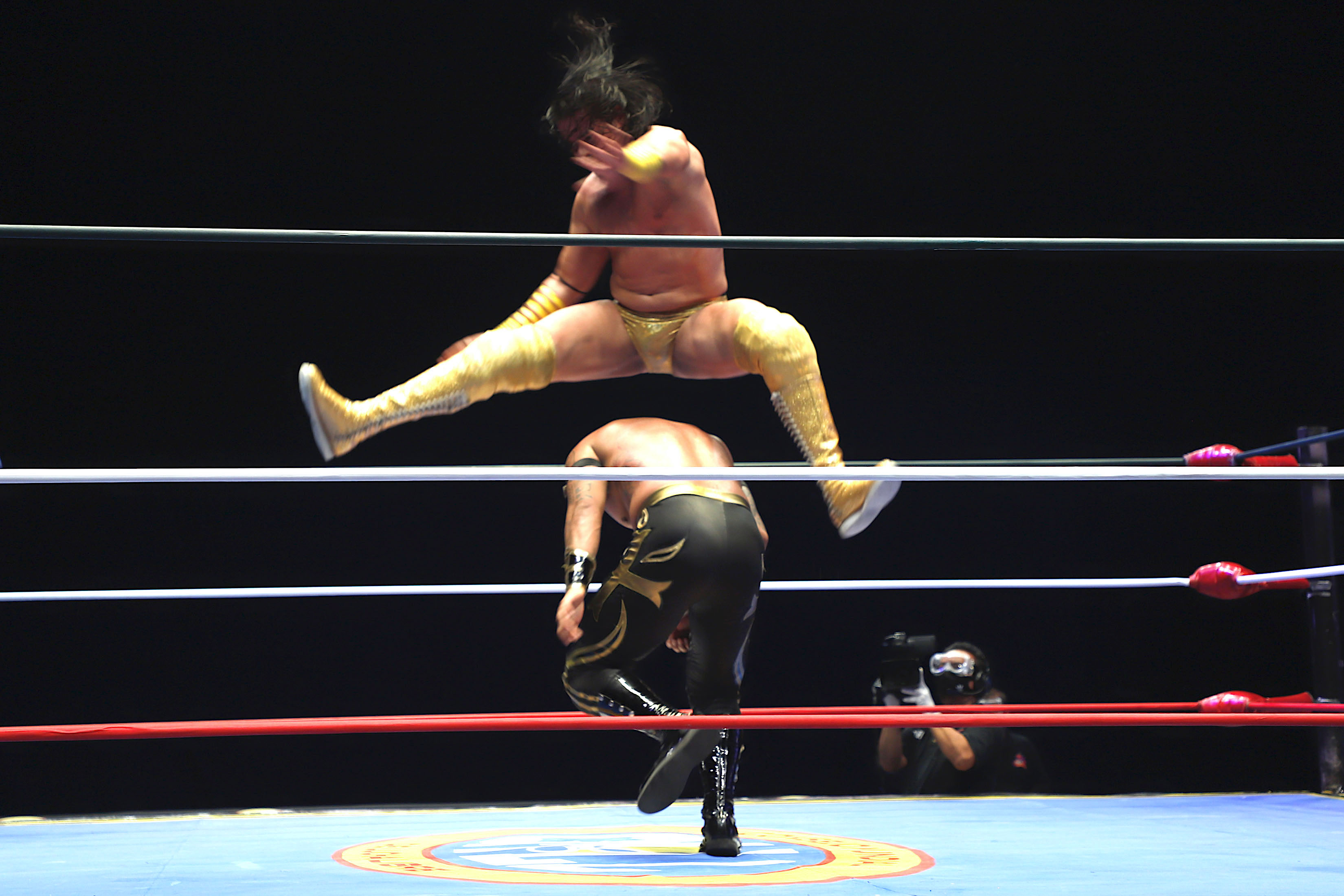
Ángel de Oro leaping over Templario during a match in 2020

In late 2020, Ángel de Oro and Roja began showing rudo tendencies, despite being booked as tecnicos. On November 27, Ángel de Oro won that year's Leyenda de Azul by lastly eliminating Diamante Azul, who was hit with a low blow by El Terrible. Afterwards, they continued to work together under the name Terriblemente Chavez, although he and his brother were still referred to as tecnicos. On March 24, 2021, they cemented their rudo turn and joined El Terrible to form Los Nuevos Ingobernables. On October 12, Ángel de Oro defeated El Felino to win the Mexican National Light Heavyweight Championship. He became a double champion on January 23, 2022, as Los Hermanos Chavez defeated Titán and Volador Jr. for the CMLL World Tag Team Championship. At the CMLL 89th Anniversary Show on September 16, he defeated Místico and Volador Jr. in a three-way match to win the Copa Independencia ("Independence Cup") tournament.

At Homenaje a Dos Leyendas on March 17, 2023, Ángel de Oro was the first wrestler eliminated in a four-way elimination match, where the two remaining wrestlers fought in a hair vs. hair Lucha de Apuestas. On May 23, he lost the Mexican National Light Heavyweight Championship to Esfinge. At the CMLL 90th Anniversary Show on September 16, Ángel de Oro lost to Volador Jr. in a Lucha de Apuestas, forcing him to have his hair shaved off. He lost to Star Jr. in the finals of the La Copa Junior VIP on May 31, 2024, but defeated him on July 26 to win his first Leyenda de Plata ("The Silver Legend") tournament. At the CMLL 91st Anniversary Show on September 13, Los Hermanos Chavez and Soberano Jr. defeated Neón, Star Jr. and Templario. On February 28, 2025, he unsuccessfully challenged Konosuke Takeshita for the NEVER Openweight Championship. At the CMLL 92nd Anniversary Show on September 19, they retained the title against El Hijo del Villano III and Villano III Jr. On November 14, Los Hermanos Chavez defeated Templario and TJP to win the Strong Openweight Tag Team Championship.

In early 2026, Ángel de Oro began a feud with the debuting Johnny Consejo, culminating in a hair vs. hair Lucha de Apuestas on February 27, where he defeated Consejo and forced him to be shaved bald after the match. On April 16, Ángel de Oro participated in CMLL's first standalone event in the United States at Palms Slam Fest, where he and Hechicero lost to Místico and Templario in the main event. At Lucha Kingdom on November 16, they lost the Strong Openweight Tag Team Championship to Unbound Co. (Taiji Ishimori and Titán) in a three-way match also involving Francesco Akira and Templario.

=== New Japan Pro-Wrestling (2012–2020) ===
In April 2012, Ángel de Oro was announced to be making his debut for New Japan Pro-Wrestling (NJPW) in May, as part of the 2012 Best of the Super Juniors tournament. Ángel de Oro opened the round-robin tournament with four back-to-back wins, defeating Taichi, Gedo, Jushin Thunder Liger, and Pac. However, he lost all four of his remaining matches to Prince Devitt, Bushi, Rocky Romero, and Kushida, failing to advance to the semi-finals with an eight point record. In January 2015, Ángel de Oro returned to Japan to take part in the Fantastica Mania 2015 tour, during which he successfully defended the CMLL World Light Heavyweight Championship against Okumura.

Ángel de Oro returned to NJPW on October 21, 2016, taking part in the 2016 Super Jr. Tag Tournament with Titán; they were eliminated in the first round by Roppongi Vice (Beretta and Romero). At Power Struggle on November 5, he, Fuego, Ryusuke Taguchi and Titán lost to David Finlay, Liger, Ricochet and Tiger Mask. On January 21, 2019, during the final night of the Fantastica Mania 2019 tour, Ángel de Oro, Atlantis and Titán unsuccessfully challenged Nueva Generación Dinamita (El Cuatrero, Forastero and Sansón) for the Mexican National Trios Championship. In January 2020, during the Fantastica Mania 2020 tour, Ángel de Oro and Niebla Roja participated in a family tag team tournament, defeating Negro Casas and Tiger in the first round, before losing to El Cuatrero and Sansón in the finals. At the end of the tour, they and Titán failed to win the Mexican National Trios Championship from Nueva Generación Dinamita.

=== Ring of Honor (2016) ===
On October 14 and 15, 2016, Ángel de Oro made his debut in the United States for Ring of Honor (ROH), through their working relationship with CMLL, for the two-night Glory by Honor event. He lost to Kamaitachi in a four-way match also involving ACH and Nick Jackson on the first night, as well as in a singles match the following night.

== Championships and accomplishments ==
- Consejo Mundial de Lucha Libre
  - CMLL World Light Heavyweight Championship (1 time)
  - CMLL World Middleweight Championship (1 time)
  - CMLL World Tag Team Championship (1 time, current) – with Niebla Roja
  - Mexican National Light Heavyweight Championship (1 time)
  - Mexican National Trios Championship (1 time) – with Diamante and Rush
  - Forjando un Ídolo (2011)
  - Mexican National Trios Championship #1 Contender's Tournament (2011) – with Diamante and Rush
  - Leyenda de Azul (2020)
  - Leyenda de Plata (2024)
  - Reyes del Aire (2011, 2012, 2017)
  - Copa Dinastías (2019) – with Niebla Roja
  - Copa Junior VIP (2021)
  - Copa Independencia (2022)
  - CMLL Newcomer of the Year (2009)
  - CMLL "Revelation" of the Year (2010)
  - Copa Halcón Suriano
  - Copa 70 Aniversario de la Arena Mexico (with Mistico, Ultimo Guerrero, & Barbaro Cavernario)
- New Japan Pro Wrestling
  - Strong Openweight Tag Team Championship (1 time) - with Niebla Roja
- Pro Wrestling Illustrated
  - PWI ranked him #113 of the top 500 singles wrestlers in the PWI 500 in 2022
- Súper Luchas Magazine
  - Newcomer of the Year (2009)

== Luchas de Apuestas record ==
Winner (wager)	Loser (wager)	Location	Event	Date	Notes
Ángel de Oro (mask)	Fabián el Gitano (mask)	Mexico City	Infierno en el Ring	July 18, 2010	(Note: The last two participants in a 12 man steel cage match that also included Ángel de Plata, Ángel Azteca Jr., Diamante, Sensei, Hooligan, Monster, Puma King, Tiger Kid, Doctor X and Histeria)
El Cuatrero (mask)	Ángel de Oro (mask)	Mexico City	Homenaje a Dos Leyendas	March 16, 2018	
Los Hermano Chavez (hair) (Ángel de Oro and Niebla Roja)	Los Ingobernables (hair) (El Terrible and La Bestia del Ring)	Mexico City	Homenaje a Dos Leyendas	March 15, 2019	
Volador Jr. (hair)	Ángel de Oro. (hair)	Mexico City	CMLL 90th Anniversary Show	September 16, 2023	
Ángel de Oro (hair)	Johnny Consejo (hair)	Mexico City	Viernes Espectacular	February 27, 2026	
