= En Busca de un Ídolo 2013 =

2013 Consejo Mundial de Lucha Libre tournament

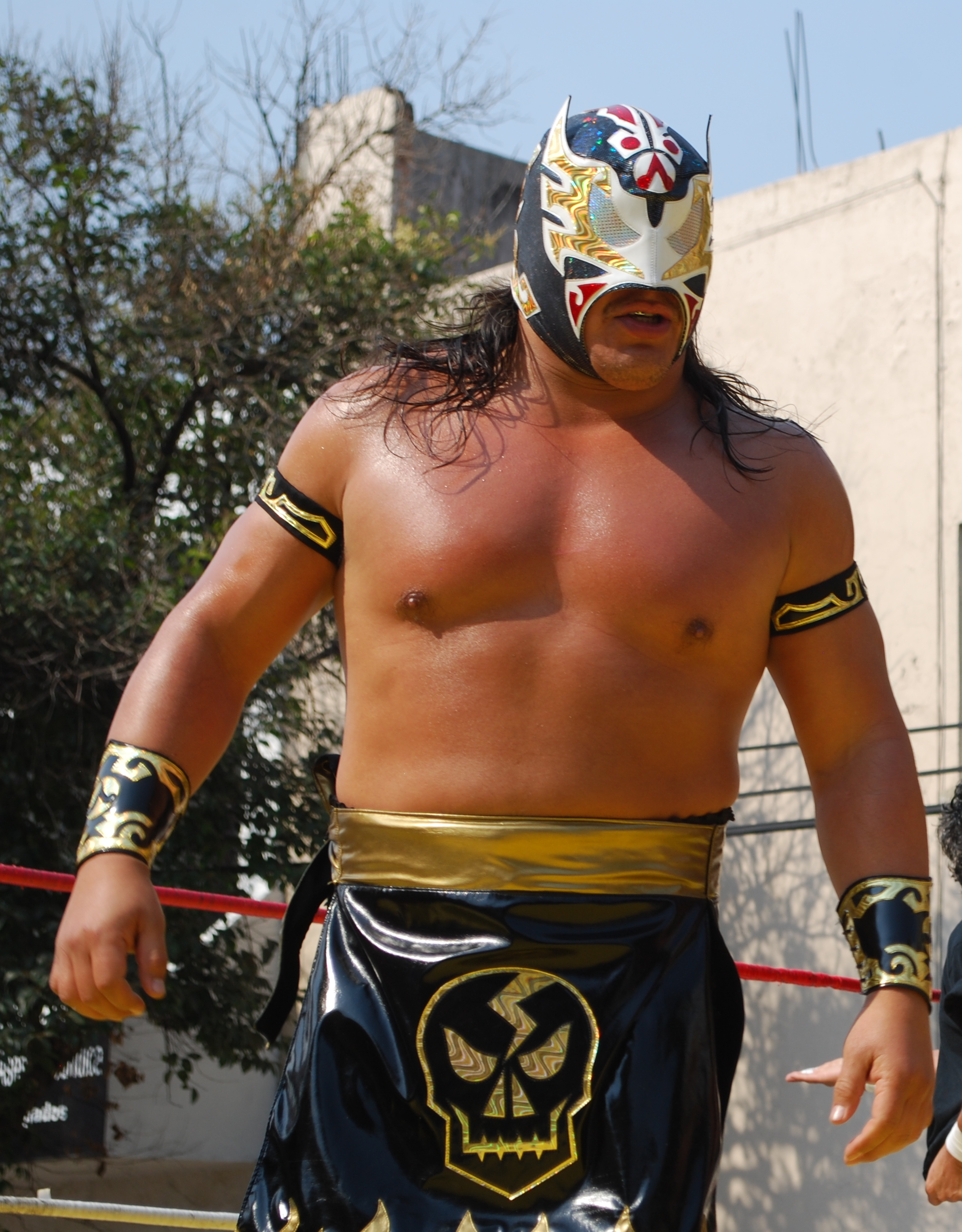
- Último Guerrero judge in the 2013 tournament.
- Promotion: Consejo Mundial de Lucha Libre
- Date: May 17, 2013 – July 21, 2013
- City: Mexico City, Mexico
- Venue: Arena México
- Tagline(s): "Ahora o Nunca!" ("Now or Never")

Event chronology
← Previous; Arena Mexico 57th Anniversary Show	Next → Sin Salida

En Busca de un Ídolo chronology
← Previous; 2012	Next → 2014

The 2013 En Busca de un Ídolo (Spanish for "In search of an idol") was a professional wrestling tournament held by Mexican professional wrestling promotion Consejo Mundial de Lucha Libre (CMLL). CMLL held their second annual En Busca de un Ídolo tournament in 2013, from May 17 until July 21, 2013 with all matches taking place in CMLL's main building, Arena México. Unlike the 2012 tournament where most of the participants were rookies, most of the 2013 En Busca de un Ídolo had been active wrestlers longer than most of the 2012 contestants, shifting the focus from "youth" to where wrestlers generally work on CMLL shows. None of the 2012 participants were included in the 2013 tournament. The "Theme" of the 2013 show was "Ahora o Nunca!" ("Now or Never"). The first round of the tournament involved a Round-robin tournament format where each member of the tecnico (wrestlers who portray the good guys) team will face all four members of the rudo (bad guy) team between May 21 and June 11. The top two point earners from each group then faced off in the second round between June 21 and July 5. The finals of the tournament took July 12, 2013 and saw Vangelis defeat Valiente to win the tournament.

== Participants ==
Tecnico team

- Director: Rush
- Trainer: Negro Casas
- Valiente
- Fuego
- Stuka Jr.
- El Hijo del Fantasma

Rudo team

- Director: El Terrible
- Trainer: Virus
- Misterioso Jr.
- Vangelis
- Sangre Azteca
- Tiger

== Point system ==
Wrestlers could earn points in a couple of ways during the tournament.

- Match results

- 20 Points for a victory
- 10 Points for a draw
- 0 points for a loss

- Judging

- The tournament also included four judges, referee El Tirantes, Tony Salazar, Último Guerrero and Brazo de Plata. The judges awarded up to 10 points each based on a wrestlers performance, including the way they portray their character, their personality, their charisma, and how much of a fan response they get during their matches.

- Online Poll

- The third way to earn points for the tournament was through an online poll conducted after each match on the En Busca de un Ídolo website. The online poll could give a wrestler a maximum of 40 additional points in the tournament each week.

== Round one ==
Final score

No.	Wrestler:	Match	Judging	Poll	Total Points
1	Valiente	60	121	152	333
2	Vangelis	60	84	136	280
3	Stuka Jr.	40	100	138	278
4	Fuego	40	86	80	206
5	El Hijo del Fantasma	60	114	28	202
6	Tiger	40	102	22	164
7	Sangre Azteca	0	95	45	140
8	Misterioso Jr.	20	53	42	115

== Round two ==
Final score

No.	Wrestler:	Match	Judging	Poll	Total Points
1	Vangelis	60	117	83	260
2	Valiente	40	104	106	250
3	Stuka Jr.	20	91	114	225
4	Fuego	0	93	63	156

== Finals and aftermath ==
On July 12, 2013 Vangelis defeated Valiente to win the tournament. Following his tournament victory Vangelis was invited to join El Terrible and Rey Bucanero in La Fuerza TRT, pushing Tiger out of the group.
