= Forjando un Ídolo =

Consejo Mundial de Lucha Libre tournament

- The official logo for the tournament
- Promotion: Consejo Mundial de Lucha Libre
- Date: April 11, 2011 to May 20, 2011
- City: Mexico City, Mexico
- Venue: Arena México

Event chronology
← Previous; Torneo Gran Alternativa	Next →: 55. Aniversario de Arena México

Forjando un Ídolo (Spanish for "Forging an idol") was a professional wrestling tournament held by Mexican professional wrestling promotion Consejo Mundial de Lucha Libre (CMLL) in 2011 with the purpose of identifying which of the 16 "Rookies" in the tournament would move up the ranks of the promotion. The tournament consisted of two rounds, first a round robin group round, with the top 2 in each of the four groups competing in an elimination tournament. Wrestlers would earn points based on match results and points from a weekly online poll. The tournament ran from April 11 until May 20, 2012 and saw Ángel de Oro win the tournament. The top two from each group would team up with their mentor for a trios tournament called Forjando un Ídolo: La Guerra Continúa ("Forging an Idol: The war continues"), won by Atlantis, Guerrero Maya Jr. and Delta.

== Background ==
The event featured sixteen professional wrestlers some of whom were técnicos (the Mexican Spanish term for someone who portrays a "good guy" character) and some who were rudos ("Bad Guys"). Being a professional wrestling tournament, the matches were not won legitimately through athletic competition; it is instead won via predetermined outcomes to the matches that is kept secret from the general public.

== Tournament ==
The tournament was divided into two rounds, in the first round wrestlers were divided into groups of four for a round-robin style tournament where a wrestler scores points for winning matches or draws. A wrestler would earn 3 points for a victory, 1 point in case of a draw. each week of the first round one additional point would be awarded based on an online poll. Each group was also assigned a "Coach", an experienced wrestler with the storyline being that they were actually training everyone in their group between events. The four groups were

Grupo Alfa

- Diamante
- Hijo del Signo
- Hombre Bala Jr.
- Puma King
- Coach: Negro Casas

Grupo Bravo

- Ángel de Oro
- Palacio Negro
- Rey Cometa
- Rey Escorpión
- Coach: Último Guerrero

Grupo Charly

- Delta
- Dragon Lee
- Guerrero Maya Jr.
- Metal Blanco
- Coach: Shocker

Grupo Delta

- Ángel de Plata
- Fuego
- Magnus
- Pólvora
- Coach: Blue Panther

Metal Blanco received an extra point from the online polls in the first week (April 11 - April 18), Guerrero Maya Jr. received an extra point in the second week (April 18 - April 25) and Rey Escorpión received the extra point in the third week of voting (April 25 - May 2). Due to both Metal Blanco and Guerrero Maya. Jr. receiving an extra point they were tied for second in Grupo Charly and had to face off in a decision match, which saw Guerrero Maya Jr. earn the right to advance to the second round. The second round of the tournament was a single elimination tournament, which saw eight wrestlers face off, in the end Ángel de Oro defeated Pólvora to win the tournament.

=== Tournament Overview ===
Final standings
Group Alpha		Group Bravo		Group Charly		Group Delta	
Diamante	9	Ángel de Oro	9	Delta	9	Pólvora	6
El Hijo del Signo	6	Rey Escorpión	7	Guerrero Maya Jr.	4	Fuego	6
Hombre Bala Jr.	3	Palacio Negro	3	Metal Blanco	4	Magnus	3
Puma King	0	Rey Cometa	0	Dragon Lee	3	Ángel de Plata	3

Round Robin Tournament
Group Alpha	Diamante	El Hijo del Signo	Hombre Bala Jr.	Puma King
Diamante	X	Diamante (09:08)	Diamante (04:45)	Diamante (10:15)
El Hijo del Signo	Diamante (09:08)	X	Hijo del Signo (10:36)	Hijo del Signo (10:35)
Hombre Bala Jr.	Diamante (04:45)	Hijo del Signo (10:36)	X	Hombre Bala Jr. (12:31)
Puma King	Diamante (10:15)	Hijo del Signo (10:35)	Hombre Bala Jr. (12:31)	X
Group Bravo	Ángel de Oro	Palacio Negro	Rey Cometa	Rey Escorpión
Ángel de Oro	X	Ángel de Oro (10:18)	Ángel de Oro (07:23)	Ángel de Oro (10:12)
Palacio Negro	Ángel de Oro (10:18)	X	Palacio Negro (11:10)	Rey Escorpión (08:48)
Rey Cometa	Ángel de Oro (10:18)	Palacio Negro (11:10)	X	Rey Escorpión (05:53)
Rey Escorpión	Ángel de Oro (10:18)	Rey Escorpión (08:48)	3 (11:13)	X
Group Charly	Delta	Dragon Lee	Guerrero Maya Jr.	Metal Blanco
Delta	X	Delta (12:02)	Delta	Delta (10:58)
Dragon Lee	Delta (12:02)	X	Dragon Lee (09:24)	Metal Blanco
Guerrero Maya Jr.	Delta	Dragon Lee (09:24)	X	3 (11:13)
Metal Blanco	Delta (10:58)	Metal Blanco	Dragon Lee (09:24)	X
Group Delta	Ángel de Plata	Fuego	Magnus	Pólvora
Ángel de Plata	X	Fuego (09:28)	Magnus (09:37)	Ángel de Plata (10:47)
Fuego	Fuego (09:28)	X	Fuego (07:23)	Pólvora (08:45)
Magnus	Magnus (09:37)	Fuego (07:23)	X	Pólvora (07:16)
Pólvora	Ángel de Plata (10:47)	Pólvora (08:45)	3 Pólvora (07:16)	X

=== Playoffs ===
Quarterfinals
Diamante
Fuego	W
Ángel de Oro	W
Guerrero Maya Jr.
El Hijo del Signo
Pólvora	W
Rey Escorpión
Delta	W

Semifinals
Fuego
Ángel de Oro	W
Pólvora	W
Delta

Final
Ángel de Oro	W
Pólvora

== Forjando un Ídolo: La Guerra Continúa ==
CMLL kept the Forjando un Ídolo concept going with a four team Trios tournament, which saw the coach of each group team up with the two finalist for the groups. Like the original Forjando un Ídolo tournament it would start with a Round-Robin tournament with the top two point earners meeting in the finale. Shocker, the coach for Groupo Charly was injured at the time and had to be replaced with Atlantis, with Shocker still accompanying them to the ring. In the finals Groupo Charly (Atlantis, Guerrero Maya Jr. and Delta) defeated Grupo Bravo (Negro Casas, Diamante and Hijo del Signo).

=== Trios tournament brackets ===
Final standings
Team	Points
Team Charly (Atlantis, Delta and Guerrero Maya Jr.)	6
Team Alpha (Negro Casas, Diamante and El Hijo del Signo)	6
Team Bravo (Último Guerrero, Ángel de Oro and Rey Escorpión)	3
Team Delta (Blue Panther, Fuego, Pólvora)	3

Round Robin Tournament
	Team Alpha	Team Bravo	Team Charly	Team Delta
Team Alpha	X	Team Alpha	Team Charly	Team Alpha
Team Bravo	Team Alpha	X	Team Charly	Team Bravo
Team Charly	Team Charly	Team Charly	X	Team Delta
Team Delta	Team Alpha	Team Bravo	Team Charly	X

== Aftermath ==
After the tournament was over CMLL offered Ángel de Oro the opportunity to use the Místico mask and name that had been vacated when the original Místico left to work as Sin Cara in WWE. Ángel de Oro turned the offer down for unknown reasons, causing CMLL to give the mask and ring character to Dragon Lee instead, who made his debut as Místico La Nueva Era ("The New Era") in June, 2012.

On November 16, Atlantis announced that he was officially forming a stable named Los Reyes de la Atlantida ("The Kings of Atlantis") with Delta and Guerrero Maya Jr. During the press conference to announce the new group the announcement was interrupted by Shocker, angry that his team had turned to Atlantis instead of him and introduced his own trio, consisting of himself and two new characters Titán (formerly Palacio Negro) and Tritón (formerly Metal Blanco). The storyline with Los Reyes was dropped only a few weeks later when Shocker was taken off the shows for personal reasons. On December 16, Los Reyes de la Atlantida defeated Los Invasores (Olímpico, Psicosis II and Volador Jr.) to win the Mexican National Trios Championship at CMLL's Sin Piedad show.

The following year, the tournament was essentially repackaged as En Busca de un Ídolo.
