= CMLL Universal Championship (2011) =

Mexican professional wrestling tournament

- Official poster for the Universal Championship finale, depicting La Sombra (left) and Averno (right)
- Promotion: Consejo Mundial de Lucha Libre
- Date: September 2, 2011; September 9, 2011; September 16, 2011
- City: Mexico City, Mexico
- Venue: Arena México

Event chronology
← Previous; Mini-Estrellas Torneo de Parejas Increibles	Next → Leyenda de Plata

CMLL Universal Championship tournaments chronology
← Previous; 2010	Next → 2012

The CMLL Universal Championship 2011 (Campeonato Universal in Spanish) was a professional wrestling tournament produced by the Consejo Mundial de Lucha Libre (CMLL) promotion, which took place over three shows between September 2, 2011, and September 16, 2011, in Arena México, Mexico City, Mexico. The CMLL Universal Championship is an annual tournament of CMLL Champions that was first held in 2009. The 2011 tournament was the first one to include a non-CMLL Champion as New Japan Pro-Wrestling's IWGP Heavyweight Champion Hiroshi Tanahashi also took part in the tournament.

== Background ==
The tournament featured 15 professional wrestling matches under single-elimination tournament rules, which means that wrestlers were eliminated when they lose a match. There were no specific storylines that build to the tournament, which has been held annually since 2009. All male "non-regional" CMLL champions at the time of the tournament were involved in the tournament with the exception of the reigning CMLL World Mini-Estrella and Mexican National Lightweight Champions, who have never taken part in the tournament. Regionally promoted championships such as the CMLL Arena Coliseo Tag Team Championship and the Occidente championships promoted in Guadalajara, Jalisco were not included in the tournament; only titles that have been defended in CMLL's main venue Arena Mexico were included. The tournament was divided into two qualifying blocks, which took take place on September 2 and September 9, while the finals took place on September 16, 2011.

== 2011 Universal Championship tournament ==
When CMLL announced the 2011 tournament the following champions were eligible to participate:

Participant	Championship held
Ángel de Oro	Mexican National Trios Championship
Averno	CMLL World Trios Championship; NWA World Historic Middleweight Championship
Diamante	Mexican National Trios Championship
Dragón Rojo Jr.	CMLL World Tag Team Championship
Ephesto	CMLL World Trios Championship
Héctor Garza	CMLL World Heavyweight Championship
Jushin Thunder Liger	CMLL World Middleweight Championship; CMLL Universal Championship
La Máscara	Mexican National Light Heavyweight Championship
Máscara Dorada	CMLL World Welterweight Championship
Mephisto	CMLL World Trios Championship
Pólvora	Mexican National Welterweight Championship
Rey Bucanero	NWA World Historic Light Heavyweight Championship
Rush	CMLL World Light Heavyweight Championship; Mexican National Trios Championship
La Sombra	NWA World Historic Welterweight Championship
Último Guerrero	CMLL World Tag Team Championship
Virus	CMLL World Super Lightweight Championship

- Reigning Universal Champion Jushin Thunder Liger did not take part in the tournament; instead, his spot was filled by fellow New Japan Pro-Wrestling representative and reigning IWGP Heavyweight Champion Hiroshi Tanahashi.

Block A

Block A took place on September 2, 2011, and featured eight champions wrestling for a place in the finals.

Quarterfinals
Diamante	Pin
Pólvora
Ángel de Oro
La Sombra	Pin
Héctor Garza
Rey Bucanero	Pin
Ephesto
Mephisto	Pin

Semifinals
Diamante
La Sombra	Pin
Rey Bucanero	Pin
Mephisto

Finals
La Sombra	Pin
Rey Bucanero

Block B

Block B took place on September 9, 2011, and featured eight champions wrestling for a place in the finals.

Quarterfinals
Rush
Último Guerrero	Pin
Tanahashi	Pin
Máscara Dorada
Averno	Pin
Virus
Dragón Rojo Jr.
La Máscara	Pin

Semifinals
Último Guerrero	Pin
Tanahashi
Averno	Sub
La Máscara

Finals
Último Guerrero
Averno	Pin

Finals

The finals of the tournament took place on September 16, 2011, and saw La Sombra defeat Averno two falls to one to become the 2011 Universal Champion.
