= Los Cabos Magazine =

Lifestyle and tourism magazine in Mexico

Los Cabos Magazine is a Mexican lifestyle and tourism magazine with a special reference to Los Cabos. The magazine was founded in 1993. From 2007 it is published on a quarterly basis.

The magazine is published in English and provides information about Los Cabos targeting tourists as well as local residents. Its headquarters is in Cabo San Lucas. It also has offices in San Diego, United States.
