= Vangelis (wrestler) =

Mexican professional wrestler

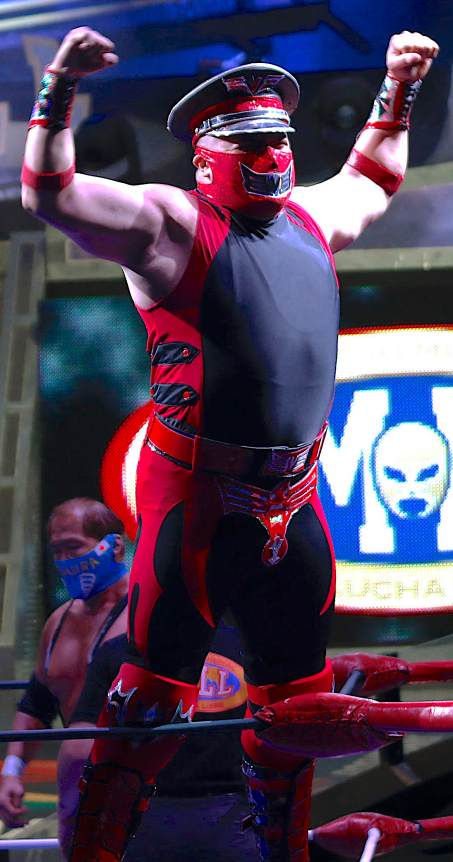
- Vangelis in July 2020

Personal information
- Born: September 7, 1981 (age 45) Mexico

Professional wrestling career
- Ring name(s): Vangelis/Vangellys; Espantapájaros I or III
- Billed height: 1.82 m (5 ft 11 1/2 in)
- Billed weight: 95 kg (209 lb)
- Trained by: El Torero; Dick Angelo; Huracán González
- Debut: 1999

Vangelis (sometimes spelled Vangellys; born September 7, 1981) is the ring name of a Mexican professional wrestler, known for his work for the Mexican promotion Consejo Mundial de Lucha Libre (CMLL). He portrays a rudo ("bad guy") wrestling character. He has formerly worked for Lucha Libre AAA World Wide (AAA) in Mexico, Dragon Gate in Japan and extensively on the Mexican independent circuit. Vangelis is the winner of the 2013 En Busca de un Ídolo tournament and a former holder of the Mexican National Light Heavyweight Championship.

== Professional wrestling career ==
Vangelis trained under El Torero, Dick Angelo and Huracán González, before making his professional wrestling debut in 1999.

=== AAA (1999–2004, 2006) ===
He quickly began working for AAA, training at their school while only occasionally wrestling on their television shows. Vangelis was teamed up with Jimmy Boy and Billy to form a boy band inspired group called Los Spice Boys. At Triplemanía VII, Jimmy Boy, Billy and Vangelis defeated Los Payasos (Coco Amarillo, Coco Rojo and Coco Verde) in one of the undercard matches. At the 2000 Guerra de Titanes event Los Spice Boys lost to Los Vatos Locos (Espiritu, Nygma, Picudo and Silver Cat). In 2001, Vangelis was given a new ring character, that of a Nazi soldier, complete with swastika armband and the Nazi salute that naturally made him a rudo, a heel or "bad guy" character. Vangelis formed a group known as Los Warriors along with Kevin (a sailor), Brandon (an Aztec warrior) and Uri (a viking), although Uri only worked with the group for a few months. Los Warriors had a long running storyline feud against Los Barrio Boys, former partners Billy Boy and Alan (Jimmy Boy using a new name) as well as Decnis. The feud between the two factions saw Vangelis win his first ever Luchas de Apuestas, or bet match, when he defeated Alan in a Steel cage match that involved all members of Los Warriors and Los Barrio Boys.

In 2005, Vangelis traveled to Japan to work for an extended period of time in the Japanese Dragon Gate promotion. While in Japan, he often wrestled against the comedy duo known as "The Florida Brothers" (Michael Iwasa and Daniel Mishima) as well as competing in the 2005 "Survival Gate" battle royal, won by Susumu Yokosuka. He returned to Mexico and AAA in 2006 where he was given a masked character as part of Los Espantapájaros ("The Scarecrows"). As the three Espantapájaros all wore identical masks and outfits, it was never completely verified if he worked as Espantapájaros I or Espantapájaros III for those matches. He would later leave AAA and work on the Mexican independent circuit, including El Dandy's short lived ENSEMA wrestling promotion. During his stint with ENSEMA, he seemingly won the Mexican National Light Heavyweight Championship from El Dandy. However, no records were ever found of the show where the match took place, making it possible that the title was bought by Vangelis instead. (Note: From time to time promotions will award a title to a wrestler and then publicise results of a match that did not actually take place.)

=== Consejo Mundial de Lucha Libre (2007–2021) ===
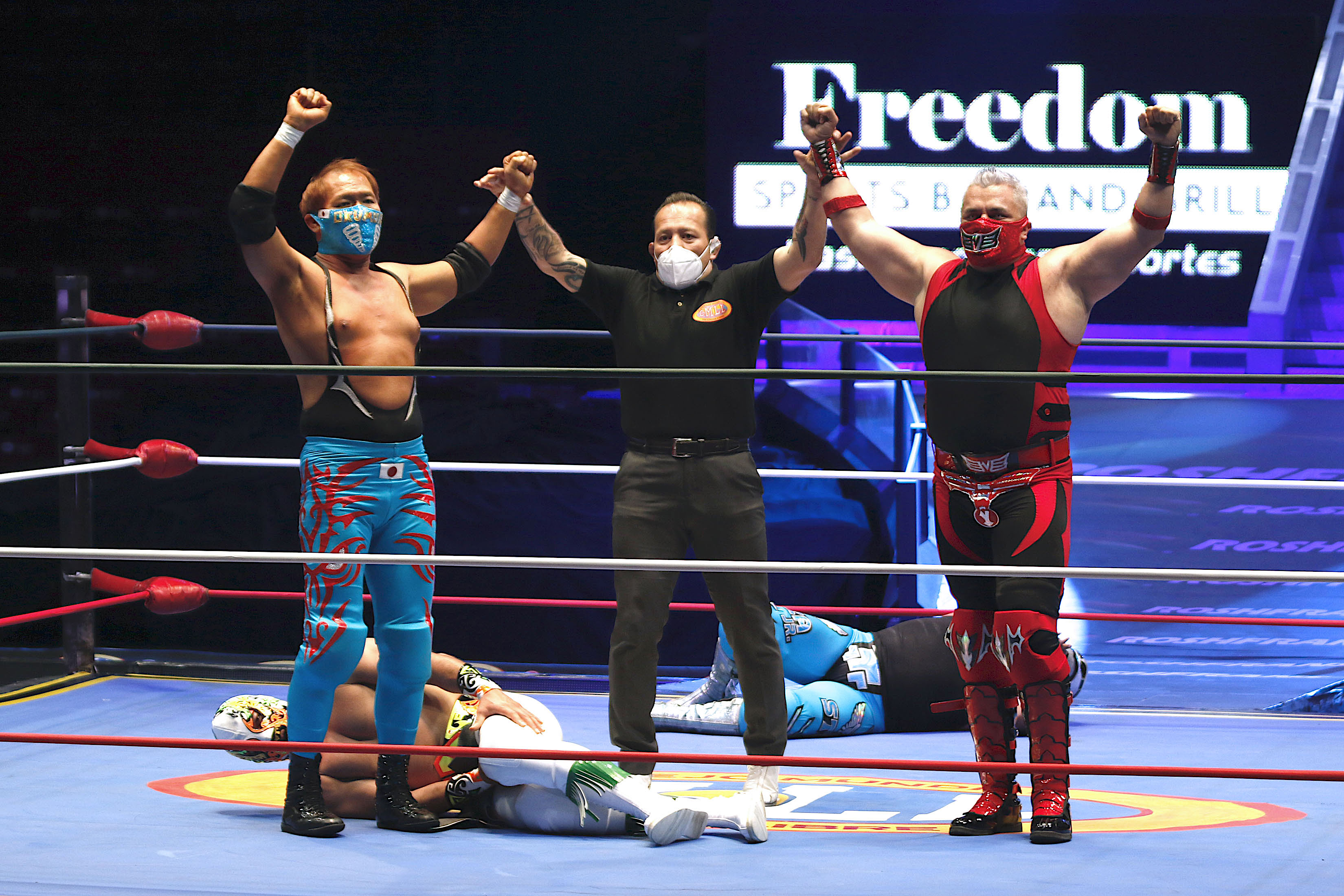
Vangelis (right) in July 2020, celebrating a fall with Okumura

On December 4, 2007, Vangelis worked his first match for Consejo Mundial de Lucha Libre (CMLL) and he lost the Light Heavyweight Championship to Místico in a match where Místico's CMLL World Welterweight Championship also being on the line. This marked the beginning of Vangelis' stint in CMLL. In CMLL he worked mainly on the lower half of the card in trios matches with mixed success. In 2008, he was named as a member of "Generación del 75", a group of young wrestlers who exemplified the "CMLL future" in CMLL's 75th anniversary year. The group also included Flash, Mictlán, Tiger Kid, Hijo del Faraón, Axxel, El Hijo del Fantasma, Bronco, Metalik, Puma King, Skándalo, Súper Nova and Ángel Azteca Jr. CMLL held a tournament for the vacant CMLL Arena Coliseo Tag Team Championship, and had Vangelis team up with Loco Max to form one of the 16 teams that participated. The team lost to Bronco and Diamante Negro in the first round of the tournament. On June 27, 2008 Vangelis competed for the Trofeo Generacion del 75 (Generation of 75 Trophy), a tournament for young wrestlers who had joined CMLL during their 75th year of operation. El Hijo del Fantasma won the match but Ángel Azteca Jr. was able to make a good showing for himself. In 2009, he began to regularly appear in the corner of El Terrible and El Texano Jr. at times replacing La Comandante, who had a similar Nazi gimmick. He was in the corner of Terrible and Texano Jr. at CMLL's 2009 Sin Salida event as they won the main event match. In March 2013, Vangelis was announced as participating in the 2013 En Busca de un Ídolo ("In search of an Idol") tournament that would take place from May to July 2013 as one of eight competitors. On July 12, Vangelis defeated Valiente in the finals to win the tournament. On August 11, Vangelis joined El Terrible's and Rey Bucanero's La Fuerza TRT stable, which was as a result renamed TRT: La Máquina de la Destrucción ("TRT: The Machine of Destruction").

On January 14, 2014, Vangelis made his debut for New Japan Pro-Wrestling (NJPW), when he worked the NJPW and CMLL co-produced Fantastica Mania 2014 tour, which lasted until January 19. In March, Vangelis teamed up with tecnico wrestler Valiente for CMLL's annual Torneo Nacional de Parejas Increibles, or "National Incredible Teams tournament" where a rudo and a tecnico are forced to team up for a tag team tournament. The two lost to La Sombra and Último Guerrero in the opening round of the tournament.

In June 2017, Vangelis became involved in a storyline feud with Los Ingobernables, especially Pierroth. It was initiated on June 2, when he turned on his tag team partners Negro Casas and Rey Bucanero to allow Los Ingobernables and Hechicero to win the match. Afterward, he asked to join Los Ingobernables, but was rejected and then beaten up. The following week, he attacked Pierroth during the Gran Alternativa tournament, hitting him with a bat in the shoulder. The attack was sold as injuring Pierroth so that he was eliminated from the tournament without actually losing. In subsequent months, Vangelis and Pierroth would face off on opposite sides in numerous matches as the storyline tension escalated. The feud ended in a Lucha de Apuestas ("bet match") between the two on July 14, in the semi-main event of the Universal Championship finals show. Vangelis lost the match two falls to one, and subsequently had all his hair shaved off as a result. In December 2017, he competed in that year's Leyenda de Azul ("Blue Legend") tournament, but was eliminated before the finals.

Vangelis injured his right knee during a match on January 22, 2018, when he caught Valiente on a dive out of the ring. It was later revealed that he ruptured his patella tendon and required surgery to repair the injury. At the time, his recovery time was expected to be between six and nine months. In late 2020, Vangelis formed a new stable, Los Embajadores del Mal (The Ambassadors of Evil), alongside Okumura and Dark Magic. They made their first appearance on October 30, at Día de Muertos, in a loss to the team of Audaz, Espíritu Negro and Rey Cometa. He left the promotion on September 7, 2021.

== Championships and accomplishments ==
- Comisión de Box y Lucha Libre Mexico D.F.

- Mexican National Light Heavyweight Championship (1 time)

- Consejo Mundial de Lucha Libre

- En Busca de un Ídolo (2013)

- International Wrestling Revolution Group
  - IWRG Rey del Ring (1 time, current)

== Luchas de Apuestas record ==
Winner (wager)	Loser (wager)	Location	Event	Date	Notes
Vangelis (hair)	Alan (hair)	Huamantla	AAA show	August 13, 2002	(Note: This was a steel cage match with Los Warriors (Kevin, Brandon, Vangelis) vs Los Barrio Boys (Alan, Decnis, Billy Boy))
Pierroth (hair)	Vangellys (hair)	Mexico City	Universal Championship finals	July 14, 2017	
