= Open (Mexican magazine) =

Monthly Mexican lifestyle magazine

- Cover of the August 2017 issue featuring Mexican telenovela actress and singer María León

Open is a monthly Mexican lifestyle magazine published by Editorial Metrosexual. Founded in 2005, the magazine covers different topics in each issue, such as art, cars, travel, restaurants, sex, gadgets and every other subject related to trendy men.

The editor-in-chief is Gabriel Bauducco.

== Covers ==
The covers of the magazine have always been portrayed by the most "in" men in the arts, business, sports and culture such as Diego Torres, Alfredo Harp Calderoni, David Bisbal, Hugh Jackman and soccer player Rafael Márquez. The April's issue cover portrayed Alejandra Guzmán dressed as a man.
