= Fabián el Gitano =

Mexican professional wrestler

Fabián El Gitano
- Fabián el Gitano during a match in 2010

Personal information
- Born: Emilio Fabián Fernandez de Leon; January 24, 1972 Mexico City, Mexico
- Died: March 17, 2011 (aged 39) Mexico City, Mexico

Professional wrestling career
- Ring names: Fabian El Gitano; Metro
- Billed height: 1.80 m (5 ft 11 in)
- Billed weight: 98 kg (216 lb)
- Trained by: Blue Demon; Shocker; El Satánico; El Solar
- Debut: 1994

Emilio Fabián Fernandez de Leon (January 24, 1972 – March 17, 2011) was a Mexican professional wrestler who worked under the ring names Fabián El Gitano ("Fabian the Gypsy") and Metro, sponsored by the Mexican newspaper "Metro and featuring the newspaper's logo on his tights. He spent most of his career for Consejo Mundial de Lucha Libre (CMLL).

== Professional wrestling career ==
Early in his career he teamed up with Marco Rivera and Star Boy in International Wrestling Revolution Group (IWRG), known as Los Strippers, a group of male exotic dancers, in part playing off the fact that Fernandez did at some point work as a male stripper.

Wrestled in many 6 man tag team matches. From 2005-2006 he wrestled under the mask Metro. On July 18, 2010, Fabián el Gitano lost his mask to Ángel de Oro as part of the 2010 Infierno en el Ring show.

== Personal life ==
Fernandez was one of the featured wrestlers that were the subject of the 2016 documentary "Lucha Mexico", showing his life outside of the ring, running a local gym in addition to his in-ring work.

== Death ==
On March 17, 2011, Fernandez was found dead in his home with beer bottle surrounding him. He died of pancreatic hemorrhage due to blunt trauma to the head. It was first believed to be either suicide, or murder. The official cause of death was later established as Hemorrhagic Pancreatitis.

== Metro: A shared identity ==
Several CMLL wrestlers have worked under the sponsored ring name "Metro", the most recent Metro was generally referred to as "Metro (III)" in writing but none of them are officially numbered nor promoted as separate wrestlers.

- Metro (I) – The first Metro who used the name in 2005 and 2006. Fabián el Gitano.
- Metro (Guadalajara) – Worked as Metro around the same time as Metro I, but only worked in CMLL's Farm league in Guadalajara, Jalisco. Now works under the ring name Azazel.
- Metro (II) – Worked as Metro in 2006 and 2007. Currently wrestles as Neutrón.
- Metro (III) – The final Metro, who used the name from 2009 to 2012. Current wrestled as Diamante Azul

== Luchas de Apuestas record ==
Winner (wager)	Loser (wager)	Location	Event	Date	Notes
Ángel de Oro (mask)	Fabián el Gitano (mask)	Mexico City	Infierno en el Ring	July 18, 2010	(Note: The last two participants in a 12 man steel cage match that also included Ángel de Plata, Ángel Azteca Jr., Diamante, Sensei, Hooligan, Monster, Puma King, Tiger Kid, Doctor X and Histeria)

== See also ==
- List of premature professional wrestling deaths
