= Alto Nivel =

Mexican business magazine

- Categories: Business magazine
- Frequency: Monthly
- Founded: 1998
- Country: Mexico
- Based in: Mexico City
- Language: Spanish
- Website: www.altonivel.com.mx

Alto Nivel is a monthly business and finance magazine based in Mexico City, Mexico. The magazine has been in circulation since 1998.

== History and profile ==
Alto Nivel was started in 1998. The magazine is published monthly by Iasa Comunicación. The company was acquired by a Monterrey based investor group in early 2014. Its headquarters is in Mexico City. The magazine covers articles concerning economics, finance and business. Its target audience is business executives.

As of 2020 Alto Nivel is one of ten influential finance publications in Mexico. The magazine won several awards such as CANIEM National Award for Editorial Art, UIA Award for Management Activity, National Award for Editorial Excellence and CCE for Editorial Excellence.
