= Tritón (magazine) =

Tritón is a Mexican magazine dedicated to news, books and information on swimming, diving and water polo.

== See also ==
- List of Mexican magazines
