= Veintitantos =

Mexican women's fashion magazine

Veintitantos is a Mexican women's fashion magazine that was first published in June 1994. It has features on relationships, work, sex and other issues that appeal to women ages 18 to 40. The magazine is published monthly by Editorial Notmusa, S.A. DE C.V. The headquarters is in Mexico City.

When the magazine was first released, its price was 6.00 pesos (around US$2.00 in June 1994). After 1994's great Mexican crisis, the magazine tried its best to keep price and quality at the same level but could not manage to do it. 10 years later, you can buy Veintitantos magazine for 29 pesos (around US$2.8 in 2007).
