= Luis Mante =

Mexican luchador enmascarado

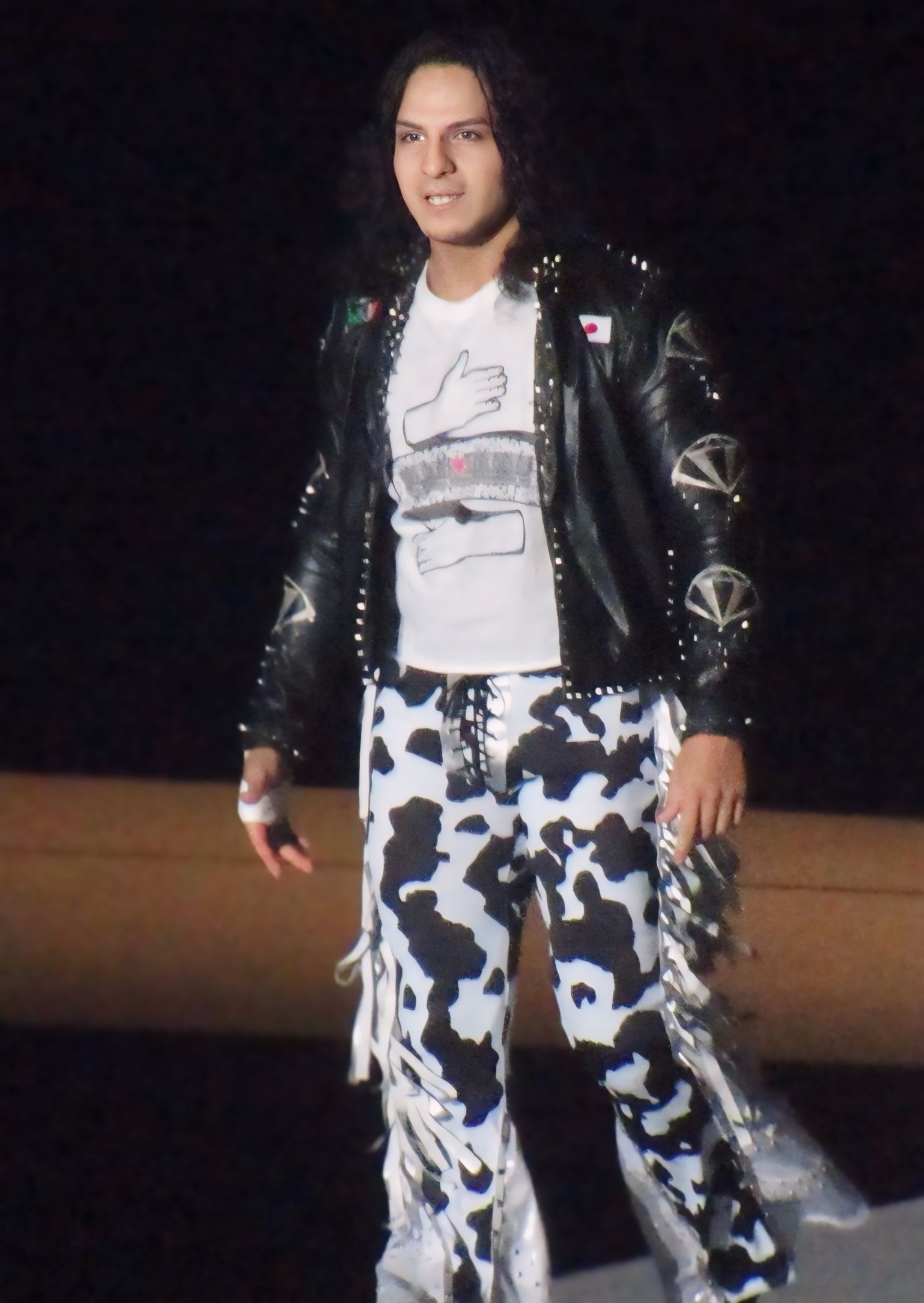
- Mante in July 2024

Personal information
- Born: February 14, 1992 (age 34) Monclova, Coahuila, Mexico
- Family: Negro Casas (father-in-law)

Professional wrestling career
- Ring name(s): Charly Meza; Aereo Boy; As Charro; As de Diamantes; As Charro jr. Chamaco Meza; Diamante; El Diamante; Luís Mante; Príncipe Diamante
- Billed height: 1.83 m (6 ft 0 in)
- Billed weight: 96 kg (212 lb)
- Billed from: Monclova, Mexico
- Trained by: Rubén el Águila sureña El Astuto; El Satánico; Franco Colombo; Último Dragón
- Debut: April 17, 2005

Luis Meza (born February 14, 1992), better known by his ring name Diamante (Spanish: "Diamond"), is a Mexican professional wrestler. He predominantly works for Dragongate under the ring name Luis Mante. He is best known for his work with Consejo Mundial de Lucha Libre (CMLL), where he portrayed a tecnico ("good guy") wrestling character.

On July 2, 2023, at Dragongate's Kobe Pro-Wrestling Festival, Diamante was unmasked, following the event's Luchas de Apuestas five-way main event. Prior to the match, he had been teased to lose his mask by former Z-Brats partner and stable leader Shun Skywalker, and this transpired when Skywalker escaped the cage in the final fall of the match.

== Professional wrestling career ==
=== Early career ===
Luis Meza made his debut at a very early age, initially working as Chamaco Meza ("Kid" Meza) and also worked as Aero Boy early on, working primarily in Nuevo León. Later on, he adopted a new ring name and image as Príncipe Diamante ("Prince Diamond"). He worked for Lucha Libre AAA Worldwide at the age of just 16, wrestling at the 2008 Rey de Reyes show teaming with Street Boy and Tigre Cota to defeat Black Mamba, Rio Bravo and Tito Santana.

=== Consejo Mundial de Lucha Libre (2009–2013; 2017–2018) ===
==== As Jr. ====
Príncipe Diamante signed a contract with Consejo Mundial de Lucha Libre (CMLL) in the summer of 2009 and initially worked under the name "As Jr." (Ace Junior), although it was never clear which "Ace" he was supposed to be the son of.

==== Diamante ====
After working as As Jr. for a few months he had his ring name changed to "Diamante", not revealing that he worked as As Jr. until years later. As Diamante he made his in-ring debut for CMLL on August 17, 2009. The first sign of Diamante's potential in CMLL came on June 16, 2010, when he entered in the 2010 torneo Gran Alternativa, where a rookie and a "veteran" wrestler teamed up for a tag team tournament. Diamante teamed with La Sombra for the tournament; together they defeated Cancerbero and Mephisto in the first round, Inquisidor and Atlantis in the second round, but lost to the team of Hector Garza and Pólvora in the semi-final round. The following month Diamante was one of 12 wrestlers to risk their match in CMLL's Infierno en el Ring main event, a steel cage match where the last man would be forced to unmask. Diamante was the 8th man to leave the ring and watched as Ángel de Oro defeated Fabián el Gitano, forcing him to unmask. Diamante teamed up with Ángel de Oro and Rush to defeat Metal Blanco, Palacio Negro and Sagrado in the finals of a two-week-long tournament to become the number one contenders to the Mexican National Trios Championship. On January 9, the trio defeated Delta, Metro and Stuka Jr. to become the new champions. Weeks after winning the Trios championship Diamante entered the annual Torneo Nacional de Parejas Increibles, a tournament that featured teams of wrestlers who do not usually team up, in fact most of the teams are on opposite sides of the Tecnico/Rudo (Fan favorite/villain) divide. Diamante teamed with the rudo Volador Jr. and made it into the semi-finals of the tournament by defeating Stuka Jr. and Ephesto as well as La Sombra and Misterioso Jr., but were defeated by eventual tournament winners Máscara Dorada and Atlantis in the semi-finals. At the 2011 Homenaje a Dos Leyendas ("Homage to Two Legends") show Diamante teamed up with two-thirds of the team he won the Trios title from as he, Metro and Stuka Jr. defeated Los Cancerberos del Infierno (Raziel and Euforia) and Okumura in one of the mid card matches on the show.

CMLL held a Forjando un Ídolo (Spanish for "Forgin an idol") tournament in April and May 2011, with the purpose of identifying which of the 16 "Rookies" in the tournament would move up the ranks of the promotion. The tournament consisted of two rounds, first a round-robin group round, with the top 2 in each of the four groups competing in an elimination tournament. Diamante won his block by defeating all three opponents (Hijo del Signo, Hombre Bala Jr., Puma King), advancing to the second round. Diamante lost in the first match of the second round to Fuego and was eliminated from the tournament. Afterwards CMLL kept the Forjando un Ídolo concept going with a four team Trios tournament called Forjando un Ídolo: La Guerra Continúa (Forging an Idol: The War Continues"), which saw the coach of each group team up with the two finalist for the groups. Diamante and Hijo del Signo teamed up with Negro Casas (called Grupo Bravo) and made it all the way to the finals, only to lose to Grupo Charly (Atlantis, Guerrero Maya Jr. and Delta). Being a reigning CMLL Champion, Diamante was one of 16 champions who competed for the 2011 CMLL Universal Championship in September 2011. Diamante defeated Pólvora in the first round, but lost to La Sombra in the second. Diamante, Ángel de Oro and Rush's Mexican National Trios reign came to an end after 254 days, when Los Invasores (Olímpico, Psicosis and Volador Jr.) defeated them for the championship. Diamante entered the 2011 Torneo Gran Alternativa, teaming up with La Sombra again, the first team to enter two years in a row. In the first round they defeated Atlantis and Fuego, in the second round they defeated Hijo del Signo and Mr. Niebla, before losing to eventual tournament winners Escorpión and Último Guerrero in the semi-final match. He also appeared on the CMLL 78th Anniversary Show, CMLL's biggest show of the year, in an unsuccessful bid to win the 2011 Leyenda de Plata ("Silver Legend") tournament. Diamante made his first trip to Japan in January, 2012 appearing on two jointly promoted shows between CMLL and Japanese based New Japan Pro-Wrestling (NJPW) called Fantastica Mania. On the first night Diamante teamed up with Japanese natives Jushin Thunder Liger and Tetsuya Naito defeated Mephisto, Shinsuke Nakamura, Yujiro Takahashi. On the second night Diamante, Hiroshi Tanahashi and Naito lost to Mephisto, Takahashi and Kazuchika Okada. In March 2012, CMLL repackaged Metro, giving him a new blue and white mask and outfit, and changing his name to "Diamante Azul", which led to some confusion since CMLL already had a wrestler using the ring name "Diamante" on their roster. After being unsuccessful in the Forjando un Ídolo tournament in 2011, Diamante entered CMLL's En Busca de un Ídolo ("In search of an Idol") in early 2012, a tournament with a similar concept, this time with eight wrestlers contending for the trophy. Diamante qualified for the second round of the tournament with three wins and one loss. The second round was less successful for Diamante as he ended last, with two losses, but the major development took place in his last tournament match where he debut a new mask and trunk design, a silver and black scheme very reminiscent of Lucha libre legends El Santo and El Hijo del Santo and Axxel, one of El Santo's grandsons. Diamante participated in the 2012 Leyenda de Azul tournament, but was outlasted by tournament winner Diamante Azul. On July 12, 2012, Diamante and Misterioso Jr. were the last two survivors in a torneo cibernetico, qualifying for a match for the vacant Occidente Heavyweight Championship. The following week Diamante defeated Misterioso Jr. to win his first singles championship. Diamante held the title for just under two months, losing it to Olímpico on September 18, 2012. In January 2013, Diamante returned to Japan to take part in the three-day Fantastica Mania 2013 event. During the first night on January 18, he teamed with Bushi and Ryusuke Taguchi in a six-man tag team match, where they were defeated by Rey Escorpión, Tomohiro Ishii and Yujiro Takahashi. The following night, Diamante and Máscara Dorada were defeated in a tag team match by Mephisto and Okumura. During the third and final night, Diamante took part in a twelve-man torneo cibernetico, from which he was the sixth man eliminated by Okumura and which was eventually won by Tomohiro Ishii. Diamante was one of 16 wrestlers to compete for a spot in the finale of the 2013 Reyes del Aire tournament in a torneo cibernetico elimination match. He was the seventh math eliminated as he was pinned by Niebla Roja. By the end of 2013, Diamante stopped working for CMLL, either in general or under that name. He made a brief return in 2017 and 2018, with each time wrestling three matches for the promotion, either under the Diamante or Príncipe Diamante ring name.

=== Mexican independent circuit (2015–2017) ===
After either not wrestling at all from the winter of 2013 and all of 2014, or working under a different masked identity that has not been revealed, Diamante resurfaced on the Mexican independent circuit in 2015, working a couple of matches under the "Diamante" name before taking the name "As Charro" ("Ace Horseman"), not to be mistaken for the original As Charro who was active from 1963 to 1994. On May 15, 2016, he won his first title under the "As Charro" name, teaming with El Hijo de Máscara Sagrada to defeat Los Nuevos Asesinos del Ring (El Canek Jr. and El Hijo de Fishman) for the CWF Tag Team Championship. On July 3, he and El Hijo de Máscara Sagrada made their first defence of the title, in a three-way match, defeating the pairings of Histeria and Infector and Psicosis and Psicosis Jr. Their second defence of the title was on September 3 against Bandido and Emperador Azteca, but As Charro was absent, and was replaced by Golden Magic. The title has not been defended since, but As Charro and El Hijo de Máscara Sagrada remain the tag team champions.

=== All Japan Pro Wrestling (2017–2018) ===
Diamante began touring with All Japan Pro Wrestling (AJPW) in August 2017. On August 27, at the AJPW 45th Anniversary show, he was defeated in a showcase match against Carístico. He returned in November 2018, working tag team matches alongside Sam Adonis and Dylan James, and of the four matches he wrestled, he was on the winning side twice.

=== Dragon Gate (2019–present) ===
In August 2019, Diamante began touring with Dragongate. He was announced as being the newest member of the heel stable R.E.D. He made his debut on August 7, during The Gate Of Adventure tour, alongside Kazma Sakamoto and Takashi Yoshida, defeating MaxiMuM (Dragon Kid, Jason Lee and Kaito Ishida). On December 15, at Final Gate, Diamante, Yoshida and H.Y.O defeated Strong Machine Gundan (Strong Machine J, Strong Machine F and Strong Machine G) and Natural Vibes (Kzy, Genki Horiguchi and Susumu Yokosuka) in a three-way match to win the Open the Triangle Gate Championship. Shortly afterwards, Diamante was involved in a "Generation War" storyline, when following on from Último Dragón's ongoing feud with R.E.D, the wrestlers who were trained by Dragón joined him to fight against the stable. This led to wrestlers who were trained in the Dragon Gate dojo to band together and suspend the stables they were in as well, in order to establish the superior generation. On February 7, during the Truth Gate tour, Diamante, Yoshida and H.Y.O were defeated by Team Toryumon (Dragon Kid, Kenichiro Arai and Ryo Saito) in a three-way match, also involving Team Dragon Gate (Keisuke Okuda, Strong Machine J and Yosuke♥Santa Maria), ending their reign at 55 days. At King of Gate, he defeated Dragon Kid in the first round, Yosuke♥Santa Maria in the second round, before being defeated by Yamato in the quarter-finals.

== Championships and accomplishments ==
- Caution Wrestling Federation
  - CWF Tag Team Championship (1 time) – with El Hijo de Máscara Sagrada
- Consejo Mundial de Lucha Libre
  - Mexican National Trios Championship (1 time) – with Ángel de Oro and Rush
- CMLL Guadalajara
  - Occidente Heavyweight Championship (1 time)
- Dragongate
  - Open the Dream Gate Championship (1 time)
  - Open the Twin Gate Championship (1 time) – with Shun Skywalker
  - Open the Triangle Gate Championship (3 times, current) – with H.Y.O and Takashi Yoshida (1), Takashi Yoshida and Kazma Sakamoto (1), Bendito and Flamita (1)
  - Rey de Parejas (2026) – with El Cielo
- Pro Wrestling Illustrated
  - Ranked No. 74 of the top 500 singles wrestlers in the PWI 500 in 2024
- Pro Wrestling Noah
  - GHC National Championship (1 time, current)

== Luchas de Apuestas record ==
Winner (wager)	Loser (wager)	Location	Event	Date	Notes
Diamante (mask)	Bokutimo Dragon (mask)	Tokyo, Japan	The Gate of Passion 2021	April 9, 2021	
Diamante (mask)	Dragon Dia (mask)	Tokyo, Japan	Fantastic Gate 2021	December 1, 2021	(Note: This was a tag team match where Diamante was teamed with Dia Inferno and Dragon Dia was teamed with Shun Skywalker.)
Shun Skywalker (mask)	Diamante (mask)	Kobe, Japan	Kobe Pro-Wrestling Festival 2023	July 2, 2023	(Note: This was a five-way steel cage match also involving Dragon Kid, Strong Machine J, and Último Dragón.)
