= Franco Columbo =

Mexican professional wrestler and booker (1953–2026)

Personal information
- Born: Javier Esparza Coronado; August 11, 1953 Guadalajara, Jalisco, Mexico
- Died: September 20, 2026 (aged 73)

Professional wrestling career
- Ring name: Franco Columbo
- Billed height: 1.73 m (5 ft 8 in)
- Billed weight: 84 kg (185 lb)
- Trained by: Diablo Velasco
- Debut: September 1975
- Retired: 1990s

Javier Esparza Coronado (August 11, 1953 – September 20, 2026) was a Mexican professional wrestler, who also worked as a match maker and trainer for promotion Consejo Mundial de Lucha Libre (CMLL). Esparza is best known under the ring name Franco Columbo, a name he used even after retiring from wrestling.

== Professional wrestling career ==
Esparza was trained for his professional wrestling career by legendary Mexican wrestling trainer Diablo Velazco before making his debut in 1975 as "Franco Columbo". Due to Velazco's connections to Empresa Mexicana de Lucha Libre (EMLL), Mexico's largest and the world's oldest professional wrestling promotion, Columbo landed job with EMLL only a few years after making his debut. On November 1, 1980 Columbo defeated Américo Rocca to win the Mexican National Welterweight Championship, holding it for 92 days before El Supremo won it on February 1, 1981. Throughout the late 1980s and 1990s Columbo began working as a trainer for EMLL (later renamed Consejo Mundial de Lucha Libre; CMLL) helping improve young wrestlers under EMLL/CMLL contract. After retiring from active competition in the late 1990s, Columbo began being more involved in the booking aspects of CMLL, moving up the ranks to being second in charge along with Juan Manuel Mar. The two were responsible for planning CMLL's weekly shows in Arena México and Arena Coliseo, CMLL's two most popular venues, until Columbo's retirement in 2021.

== Death ==
Columbo died on September 20, 2026, at the age of 73.

== Championships and accomplishments ==
- Empresa Mexicana de Lucha Libre
  - Mexican National Welterweight Championship (2 times)
- Regional championships
  - Occidente Welterweight Championship (1 time)

== Luchas de Apuestas record ==
Winner (wager)	Loser (wager)	Location	Event	Date	Notes
Dr. O'Borman (hair)	Franco Colombo (hair)	N/A	Live event	N/A	
Gran Cochisse (hair)	Franco Colombo (hair)	Mexico City	Live event	N/A	
Franco Colombo (hair)	Guerrero Negro (hair)	Puebla, Puebla	Live event	January 10, 1982	
Águila Solitaria (mask) and Franco Colombo (hair)	Cid Campeador (mask) and Ari Romero (hair)	Mexico City	Live event	June 19, 1982	
Franco Colombo (hair)	Divino Roy (hair)	Mexico City	Live event	July 30, 1982	
Faisán (mask) and Franco Colombo (hair)	Pánico (mask) and Manuel Robles (hair)	Mexico City	Live event	August 17, 1982	
Jerry Estrada (hair)	Franco Colombo (hair)	Mexico City	Live event	July 1, 1983	
Hombre Verde (hair)	Franco Colombo (hair)	Mexico City	Live event	March 24, 1984	
Ari Romero and Franco Colombo (hair)	Los Destructores (hair) (Vulcano and Tony Arce)	Mexico City	Live event	August 26, 1984	
Javier Cruz (hair)	Franco Colombo (hair)	Mexico City	Live event	December 16, 1984	
Javier Cruz (hair)	Franco Colombo (hair)	Cuernavaca, Morelos	Live event	August 1, 1985	
Javier Cruz (hair)	Franco Colombo (hair)	Mexico City	Live event	March 23, 1986	
