= Tritón (wrestler) =

Mexican professional wrestler

Personal information
- Born: March 23, 1987 (age 39) Guadalajara, Jalisco, Mexico

Professional wrestling career
- Ring name(s): Metal Blanco; Rey Tritón; Tritón; Trittón
- Billed height: 1.68 m (5 ft 6 in)
- Billed weight: 81 kg (179 lb)
- Trained by: Cesar Dantes; Máscara Mágica; Gran Cochisse; El Satánico; Franco Colombo; Shocker
- Debut: November 20, 2006

Ernesto Ramirez Aceves (born March 23, 1987) better known by his ring name Tritón, is a Mexican professional wrestler, best known for his work in the Mexican promotion Consejo Mundial de Lucha Libre (CMLL) portraying a tecnico ("Good guy") wrestling character. Up until 2026 Tritón was an Enmascarado (masked wrestler), whose real name was not a matter of public record. He previously worked under the ring name Metal Blanco from 2005 to 2011.

== Personal life ==
Tritón is the son of professional wrestler Flash, although he is no relation to Fuego, who used to work as "Flash" as well. Outside of his date and place of birth not much personal information has been revealed about Tritón, which is not uncommon in Mexico where they place a high degree of importance in keeping masked wrestler's identities private.

== Professional wrestling career ==
In Mexico, it is traditional to keep the true identify of a masked professional wrestler a secret, not revealing their real names and often not revealing what previous ring names they have competed under, at times the officially listed debut date indicates when a wrestler began wearing a specific mask and using a name, not the professional wrestling debut, thus it is possible Tritón has been wrestling longer than since 2006 and used a different name and mask before that.

=== Consejo Mundial de Lucha Libre (2006–2019) ===
The wrestler later known as Tritón made his debut on November 20, 2006, under the ring name Metal Blanco ("White Metal") incorporating white and metallic fabric in both his mask and wrestling trunks. Initially he worked in Guadalajara, Jalisco home of one of Consejo Mundial de Lucha Libre's main wrestling schools. Metal Blanco formed a tag team known as Los Metales ("The Metals"), sometimes referred to as La Fuerza M ("The Power of M") alongside Metatron and Metalik in the early part of his career. In 2007 Metal Blanco was given his first notable victory as he defeated Jeque in a Luchas de Apuestas ("Bet Match") where Jeque was forced to have his hair shaved after the loss. He would later gain a similar Luchas de Apuestas win over Vaquero. In 2008 Metalik was made a part of the main CMLL roster and was given a new name and image, working as Máscara Dorada instead, which ended the Los Metales team. During mid-2010 Metal Blanco and Stuka, Jr. started a storyline feud against Máscara Mágica and Exterminador, that played out on CMLL's weekly shows in Guadalajara, Jalisco. On July 27, 2010, Stuka, Jr. and Metal Blanco won a Lucha de Apuesta, masks vs. hair match. Stuka, Jr. and partner originally looked like they would have to unmask after losing the third fall, but the local wrestling commission voided the results of the third fall due to cheating by Máscara Mágica and Extreminador, restarting the match. In the end Stuka, Jr. and Metal Blanco won the third and deciding fall, forcing their opponents to be shaved bald per lucha libre (the professional wrestling style originary from Mexico) traditions. In April 2010 Metal Blanco defeated Ángel del Mal to win the local Occidente Welterweight Championship

By the end of 2010 Metal Blanco, along with Palacio Negro made their wrestling debut in Mexico City, appearing at CMLL's main arena Arena Mexico. The duo teamed up with Sagrado in a tournament to determine the number one contenders for the Mexican National Trios Championship. The team was successful, advancing to the finals by defeating Los Guerreros Tuareg (Arkangel de la Muerte, Loco Max and Skándalo) and Los Cancerberos del Infierno (Euforia, Nosferatu and Pólvora). In the finals the team lost to Ángel de Oro, Diamante and Rush, who went on to win the championship. From this point forward Metal Blanco began making regular appearances in Arena Mexico. Palacio Negro was teamed up with the former Los Metals partner Máscara Dorada to participate in the 2011 Gran Alternativa tournament, where a rookie and a veteran teams up. The team won their qualification block with victories over teams such as Mephisto and Tiger Kid, Volador Jr. and Dragon Lee, Averno and Palacio Negro. They lost to Escorpión and Último Guerrero in the finals of the tournament. Following the Gran Alternativa tournament Metal Blanco was entered in CMLL's Forjando un Ídolo ("Forging an Idol") tournament along with a number of other young wrestlers, all trying to make a name for themselves. Metal Blanco defeated Dragon Lee, but lost to Guerrero Maya, Jr. and Delta, due to fan voting Metal Blanco earned an additional point, forcing a tie between himself and Guerrero Maya, Jr. for who would advance. Guerrero Maya, Jr. defeated Metal Blanco in the tiebreaker match, eliminating him from the tournament. In late 2011 Metal Blanco entered CMLL's most prestigious annual tournament the Leyenda de Plata ("Silver Legend"), he eliminated his longtime tag team partner Palacio Negro early in the match, but did was in turn eliminated around the halfway mark.

Metal Blanco and Palacio Negro stopped appearing in Mexico City in early November 2011 in preparation for being repackaged with new masks and ring names. The two were reintroduced as Titán (Palacio Negro) and Tritón (Metal Blanco), presented as new versions of characters used in the early 1990s in CMLL. The two were teamed up with Shocker, backing him up in a storyline feud against Atlantis, Guerrero Maya, Jr. and Delta, collectively known as Los Reyes de la Atlantida ("The Kings of the Atlantis"). Metro was originally announced as part of the group, but did not appear with the team outside of a press conference. The storyline with Los Reyes was dropped only a few weeks later when Shocker was taken off the shows for personal reasons. CMLL held a Torneo Sangre Nueva ("New Blood Tournament"), similar in concept of the Forjando un Ídolo tournament, and Tritón was the last man eliminated in the first round by finalist Raziel. Tritón teamed up with Atlantis to enter the 2012 Gran Alternativa tournament. The aquatic themed team defeated Hombre Bala Jr. and Marco Corleone in the opening round, Bronco and Mr. Niebla in the second round and Raziel and Volador Jr. in the semi-final. In the final they were defeated by El Terrible and Euforia. In the tradition of the Forjando un Ídolo and the Sangre Nueva tournaments CMLL created the En Busca de un Ídolo ("In search of an Idol") to highlight young wrestlers, with Tritón being one of 8 entrants. He finished second to last in the first round, winning only one match while losing three and was eliminated from the tournament. In January 2015, Tritón made his New Japan Pro-Wrestling (NJPW) debut, when he worked the Fantastica Mania 2015 tour, co-produced by CMLL and NJPW. On December 25, 2015, as part of CMLL's annual Infierno en el Ring show Tritón was one of twelve men risking their mask in the main event steel cage match. He was the fifth man to leave the cage, keeping his mask safe in the process.

On August 26, 2019, Tritón announced his departure from the CMLL from his social networks, so that the CMLL Arena Coliseo Tag Team Championship who had together with Esfinge, would be vacant.

=== Independent circuit (2019–present) ===
After his departure from the CMLL, Triton would change the name of Rey Tritón, because there was another independent luchador that is also called Tritón (Indy). On August 27, 2019, he announced on his social networks that he will accept reservations in the independent circuit as of August 28.

On October 19, Tritón made his debut at the promotion Lucha Libre AAA Worldwide (AAA) in Héroes Inmortales XIII for the Copa Antonio Peña where he was eliminated by Taurus.

On March 21, 2026, Triton lost his mask in a Lucha de Apuestas in his home city of Guadalajara to fellow Jalisco native Magnum (the father of Esfinge).

== The name Triton in Lucha libre ==
Several professional wrestlers have used the name Tritón in professional wrestling in addition to the current CMLL wrestler.

- La Pantera, was the first man to use the name in CMLL in 1993.
- Tritoncito, a Mini-Estrella version of the original Tritón.
- Neutron, worked as Tritón for a short period of time.
- Tritón, used the ring name before the current Tritón was given it by CMLL, mostly works for International Wrestling Revolution Group (IWRG) and claimed that he was the only wrestler officially licensed to use the name, while CMLL claims they had the rights due to La Pantera working under that name in CMLL in the early 1990s.

== Championships and accomplishments ==
- Consejo Mundial de Lucha Libre
  - CMLL Arena Coliseo Tag Team Championship (1 time) – with Esfinge
  - Occidente Welterweight Championship (1 time) (Note: Won the title while working as Metal Blanco, the title has not officially been vacated.)
- Desastre Total Ultraviolento
  - DTU Nexo Championship (1 time) - with Titán

== Luchas de Apuestas record ==
Winner (wager)	Loser (wager)	Location	Event	Date	Notes
Metal Blanco (mask)	Jeque (hair)	CMLL show	June 24, 2007	Guadalajara, Jalisco	
Metal Blanco (mask)	Vaquero (hair)	CMLL show	April 5, 2008	Guadalajara, Jalisco	
Stuka Jr. and Metal Blanco (masks)	Máscara Mágica and Exterminador (hair)	Guadalajara, Jalisco	CMLL show	July 27, 2010	
Magnum (mask)	Tritón (mask)	Guadalajara, Jalisco	Promociones Chaman 3rd Aniversario	March 21, 2026	
