= Homenaje a Dos Leyendas (2015) =

Mexican professional wrestling supercard show

- Official poster for the 2015 show.
- Promotion: Consejo Mundial de Lucha Libre
- Date: March 20, 2015
- City: Mexico City, Mexico
- Venue: Arena México

Pay-per-view chronology
← Previous; Torneo Nacional de Parejas Increíbles	Next →: 59. Aniversario de Arena México

Homenaje a Dos Leyendas chronology
← Previous; 2014	Next → 2016

Homenaje a Dos Leyendas (2015) (Spanish for "Homage to Two Legends") was a professional wrestling supercard show event, scripted and produced by Consejo Mundial de Lucha Libre (CMLL; "World Wrestling Council"). The Dos Leyendas show took place on March 20, 2015 in CMLL's main venue, Arena México, Mexico City, Mexico. The event was to honor and remember CMLL founder Salvador Lutteroth, who died in March 1987. Starting in 1999 CMLL honored not just their founder during the show, but also a second lucha libre legend, making it their version of a Hall of Fame event. For the 2015 show CMLL commemorated the life and career of wrestler El Faraón. This was the 17th March show held under the Homenaje a Dos Leyendas name, having previously been known as Homenaje a Salvador Lutteroth from 1996 to 1998. The 2015 Dos Leyendas show was broadcast live in 60 Cinépolis theaters in Mexico, which was the first time this format was offered in Mexico.

The main event was a tag team Lucha de Apuestas, or bet match, where each team bet their hair on the outcome of the match as the team of Máximo and Volador Jr. defeated the team known as TRT: La Máquina de la Destrucción ("TRT: The Destruction Machine"; El Terrible and Rey Bucanero). As a result of the Lucha de Apuesta stipulation both El Terrible and Rey Bucanero had their hair shaved off. The fourth match of the night was also fought under Lucha de Apuestas rules, this time with both mexican wrestler Dragon Lee and Japanese wrestler Kamaitachi both risked their mask on the outcome of the match. Dragon Lee defeated Kamaitachi, two-falls-to-one, forcing Kamaitachi to unmask and reveal his real name, Hiromu Takahashi.

== Production ==
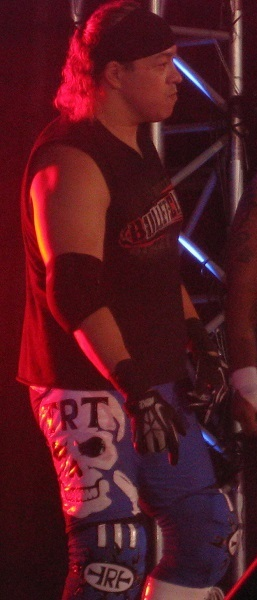
Rey Bucanero, teamed up with El Terrible for the Dos Leyendas main event match.

=== Background ===
Since 1996 the Mexican wrestling company Consejo Mundial de Lucha Libre (Spanish for "World Wrestling Council"; CMLL) has held a show in March each year to commemorate the passing of CMLL founder Salvador Lutteroth who died in March 1987. For the first three years the show paid homage to Lutteroth himself, from 1999 through 2004 the show paid homage to Lutteroth and El Santo, Mexico's most famous wrestler ever and from 2005 forward the show has paid homage to Lutteroth and a different leyenda ("Legend") each year, celebrating the career and accomplishments of past CMLL stars. Originally billed as Homenaje a Salvador Lutteroth, it has been held under the Homenaje a Dos Leyendas ("Homage to two legends") since 1999 and is the only show outside of CMLL's Anniversary shows that CMLL has presented every year since its inception. All Homenaje a Dos Leyendas shows have been held in Arena México in Mexico City, Mexico, which is CMLL's main venue, its "home". Traditionally CMLL holds their major events on Friday Nights, which means the Homenaje a Dos Leyendas shows replace their regularly scheduled Super Viernes show. The 2015 show was the 20th overall Homenaje a Dos Leyendas show.

=== Storylines ===
The Homenaje a Dos Leyendas show featured six professional wrestling matches with different wrestlers involved in pre-existing scripted feuds, plots and storylines. Wrestlers were portrayed as either heels (referred to as rudos in Mexico, those that portray the "bad guys") or faces (técnicos in Mexico, the "good guy" characters) as they followed a series of tension-building events, which culminated in a wrestling match or series of matches.

In late 2014 Consejo Mundial de Lucha Libre (CMLL) began building the storyline that would eventually lead to a 10-man steel cage elimination match where the loser would be shaved bald. During the build Volador Jr., Máximo, Rey Bucanero and El Terrible started to interact on multiple occasions as they were four of the ten wrestlers involved in the cage match. As part of the build to the 2014 Infierno en el Ring event Rey Bucanero outlasted all other competitors to win a torneo cibernetico elimination match. At Infierno en el Ring El Terrible was one of the first wrestlers to leave the cage, Máximo escaped minutes later without much interaction with Bucanero. In the end Rey Bucanero defeated El Felino, forcing Felino to have his hair shaved off as dictated by the Lucha de Apuestas, or bet match, rules. In the weeks following the Infierno en el Ring show Rey Bucanero and Volador Jr. found themselves on opposite sides of the ring repeatedly developing a more personal in-ring rivalry between the two. At the same time Máximo started to make challenges against El Terrible, looking for Terrible to put the CMLL World Heavyweight Championship on the line against him.

On January 30, 2015 Máximo finally got a championship match and ended El Terrible's 1,125 day long reign as champion when he pinned him during a CMLL Super Viernes match. In the weeks following the title change the two storylines converged as TRT teammates Rey Bucanero and El Terrible joined forces to combat the tecnico challenges of Máximo and Volador Jr. On February 10 CMLL held a press conference to announce the 2015 Homenaje a Dos Leyendas show as well as do the official contract signing for a tag team Luchas de Apuestas match where both members of the losing team would have their hair shaved off after the match. CMLL decided to team the rivals up for the 2015 Torneo Nacional de Parejas Increibles ("The National Incredible Pairs Tournament"), a tag team tournament where all teams were composed of rivals. In Block A Volador Jr. and Rey Bucanero defeated the teams of Titán and Bárbaro Cavernario, La Sombra and Negro Casas and finally La Máscara and Mephisto to qualify for the finals. For Block B of the tournament Máximo and El Terrible were teamed up and despite not getting along they defeated the teams of Dragón Rojo Jr. and Niebla Roja, Stuka Jr. and Gran Guerrero and Atlantis and Último Guerrero to earn their way to the finals, pairing the Dos Leyendas finalists against each other only a few weeks before the Dos Leyendas show. Only 2 days later Volador Jr. and Rey Bucanero outlasted Atlantis, Blue Panther, Dragón Rojo Jr., Ephesto, Misterioso Jr., Mr. Águila, Niebla Roja, Stuka Jr., Último Guerrero and Valiente to earn the right to compete for the vacant NWA World Historic Light Heavyweight Championship the following week. The tournament finals saw Máximo and El Terrible win in two straight falls as Volador Jr. and Rey Bucanero failed to get along for the match.

Dragon Lee, younger brother of CMLL wrestlers Místico and Rush made his in-ring debut on January 1, 2014, competing in the 2014 La Copa Junior tournament. This marked the debut of the wrestler voted the 2014 Rookie of the Year in the Wrestling Observer Newsletter awards. A month later Japanese wrestler Hiromu Takahashi made his CMLL debut as the enmascarado (masked) character Kamaitachi. Takahashi was the most recent young wrestler from CMLL's partner promotion New Japan Pro-Wrestling (NJPW) to travel to CMLL to gain international experience as part of his development as a wrestler. Early on Takahashi, as Kamaitachi teamed up with Okumura under the team name La Fievre Amarilla ("The Yellow Fever"). In late 2014 Dragon Lee and Kamaitachi began to face off on opposite teams leading to the two meeting in a singles match. Kamaitachi won the match by pulling Dragon Lee's mask off and using the distraction to defeat him. Unmasking a Mexican wrestler is viewed as disrespective and signalled that the storyline between the two was not over. During the following month the pattern continued with Kamaitachi pulling Dragon Lee's mask on more than one occasion. Both men were present for a CMLL press conference on February 10 where it was announced that the two would put their masks on the line in a Luchas de Apuestas match as part of the Homenaje a Dos Leyendas show. During the press conference Kamaitachi pulled out one of Dragon Lee's masks that he had stolen, angering both his opponent and the fans in attendance over the disrespectful behavior. The two were forced to team up for the 2015 Parejas Increibles tournament but lost to La Máscara and Mephisto as the two were unable to get along for even one match.

=== Homage to Salvador Lutteroth and El Faraón ===
In September 1933 Salvador Lutteroth González founded Empresa Mexicana de Lucha Libre (EMLL), which would later be renamed Consejo Mundial de Lucha Libre. Over time Lutteroth would become responsible for building both Arena Coliseo in Mexico City and Arena Mexico, which became known as "The Cathedral of Lucha Libre". Over time EMLL became the oldest wrestling promotion in the world, with 2018 marking the 85th year of its existence. Lutteroth has often been credited with being the "father of Lucha Libre", introducing the concept of masked wrestlers to Mexico as well as the Luchas de Apuestas match. Lutteroth died on September 5, 1987. EMLL, late CMLL, remained under the ownership and control of the Lutteroth family as first Salvador's son Chavo Lutteroth and later his grandson Paco Alonso took over ownership of the company.

The 2015 Homenaje a Dos Leyendas show is set to honor not only CMLL founder Salvador Lutteroth as it always does but also pay homage to retired wrestler José Luis Barajas Fernández, better known under the ring name El Faraón ("the Phaero"). Barajas began wrestling in the 1960s as the enmascarado, or masked character, El Faraón an Egyptian inspired character. In 1973 he lost his mask in a match against Fishman but had a long and successful career after his mask loss. During his active career Barajas won a number of championships including the Mexican National Middleweight Championship, NWA Intercontinental Heavyweight Championship, NWA World Light Heavyweight Championship twice and the NWA World Middleweight Championship three times. After 1983 El Faraón's career did not focus on winning championships, instead it centered around a long-running, intense storyline feud against Sangre Chicana that saw the two face off in a series of very bloody matches. The brutal brawls between the two wrestlers drew high attendance figures all over Mexico and continued on and off for several years. Barejas retired in the mid 1990s due to injuries and age. In 2007 Barejas endorse a wrestler called El Hijo de Faraon ("The Son of the Phaero"), who was later revealed to be his god son.

=== Results ===
No.	Results	Stipulations
1	Dark Angel, Goya Kong and Marcela defeated La Amapola, Dalys la Caribeña and Tiffany – Two falls to none: First fall: Dark Angel, Goya Kong and Marcel won the first fall (1-0); Second fall: Marcela pinned Dalys, Dark Angel forced Amapola to submit, Goya Kong pinned Tiffany (2-0)	Best two-out-of-three falls six-woman tag team match
2	Hechicero, Vangellys and Virus defeated Blue Panther Jr., Stuka Jr. and The Panther – Two falls to one: First fall: Virus forces Stuka Jr. to submit (1-0); Second fall: Stuka Jr. pinned Virus (1-1); Third fall: Hechicero and Vangelis pinned both Panthers (2-1)	Best two-out-of-three falls six-man tag team match
3	Titán and Sky Team (Místico and Valiente) defeated La Peste Negra (Bárbaro Cavernario, El Felino and Negro Casas) – Two falls to one: First fall: Titán, Místico and Valiente defeated La Peste Negra (1-0); Second fall: La Peste Negra defeated Titán, Místico and Valiente; Third fall: Místico forced Negro Casas to submit	Best two-out-of-three falls six-man tag team match
4	Dragon Lee defeated Kamaitachi – Two falls to one: First fall: Kamaitachi pinned Dragon Lee (1-0); Second fall: Dragon Lee pinned Kamaitachi (1-1); Third fall: Dragon Lee pinned Kamaitachi (2-1)	Best two-out-of-three falls Lucha de Apuesta, mask vs. mask match
5	Thunder and Los Guerreros Lagunero (Euforia and Último Guerrero) defeated Los Ingobernables (La Máscara, Rush and La Sombra) by disqualification – Two falls to none: First fall: Los Ingorbernables were disqualified (1-0); Second fall: Rush was disqualified for unmasking Thunder (2-0)	Best two-out-of-three falls six-man tag team match
6	Máximo and Volador Jr. defeated TRT: La Máquina de la Destrucción (El Terrible and Rey Bucanero) – Two falls to one: First fall: Rey Bucanero pinned Máximo, El Terrible pinned Volador Jr. (1-0); Second fall: Volador Jr. pinned Terrible, Máximo pinned Rey Bucanero (1-1); Third fall: Volador Jr. pinned El Terrible, Rey Bucanero pinned Volador Jr., Máximo pinned Rey Bucanero (2-1)	Best two-out-of-three falls Lucha de Apuesta, hair vs. hair, tag team match
