= Dragon Lee (wrestler) =

Mexican professional wrestler (born 1995)

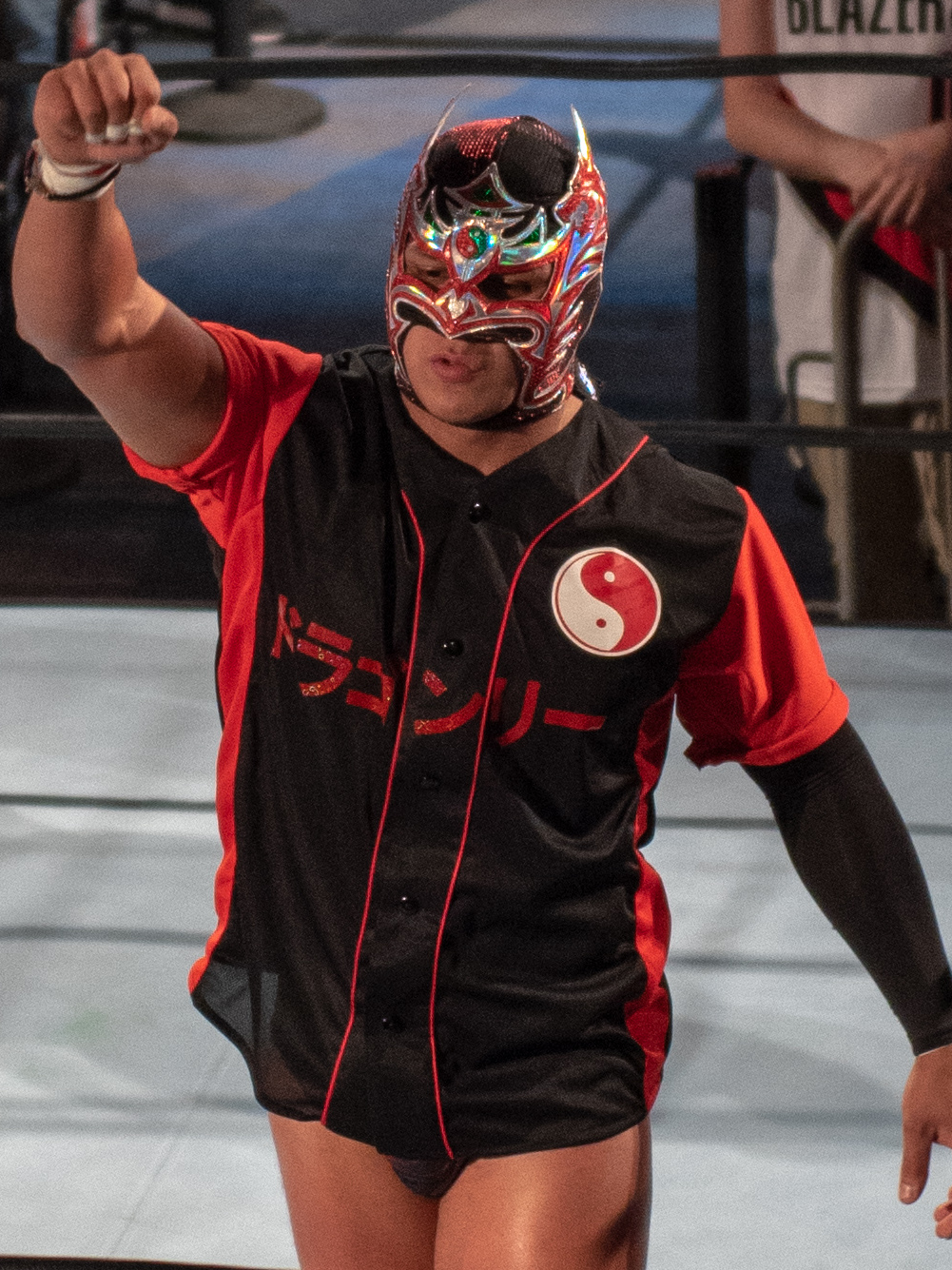
- Lee in 2019

Personal information
- Born: Emmanuel Muñoz González; May 15, 1995 (age 31) Tala, Jalisco, Mexico
- Spouse: Lupita Orozco (m. 2019)
- Children: 2
- Parent: La Bestia del Ring (father)
- Family: Dralístico (brother); Rush (brother)

Professional wrestling career
- Ring name(s): Drago; Dragon Lee (II); Ryu Lee
- Billed height: 1.71 m (5 ft 7 1/2 in)
- Billed weight: 75 kg (165 lb)
- Trained by: Alfredo Pineda; Franco Columbo; Pierrothito; Pit Bull I Arturo Muñoz
- Debut: January 1, 2014

Emmanuel Muñoz González (born May 15, 1995) is a Mexican professional wrestler. As of December 2022, he is signed to WWE, where he performs on the Raw brand under the ring name Dragon Lee, and is a member of the Latino World Order.

A second-generation wrestler, he is best known for his work for the Mexican promotion Consejo Mundial de Lucha Libre (CMLL), where he is a two-time CMLL World Lightweight Champion and a one-time CMLL World Welterweight Champion. Lee is also known for his work in Ring of Honor (ROH), where he is a two-time ROH World Television Champion and ROH World Tag Team Champion with La Faccion Ingobernable teammate Kenny King, and New Japan Pro-Wrestling (NJPW), latterly wrestling under the name Ryu Lee (リュウ・リー, Ryū Rī), where he is a former IWGP Junior Heavyweight Champion. He joined WWE in December 2023, where he wrestled on the NXT brand, and within a year, had become the NXT North American Champion.

Muñoz is the son of professional wrestler Arturo Muñoz, known under the ring name La Bestia del Ring. He is the second person to use the Dragon Lee ring persona and mask, the first Dragon Lee being his older brother, Carlos, who now wrestles under the ring name Dralístico. He also has another brother, William, who works under the ring name Rush.

== Early life ==
Emmanuel Muñoz González was born on May 15, 1995, in Tala, in the Mexican state of Jalisco, son of professional wrestler Arturo Muñoz, who had worked as Toro Blanco, Poder Boriqua, Poder Mexico, and Comandante Pierroth over the years. His two older brothers grew up to become professional wrestlers as well, with the oldest of the brothers, William, making his wrestling debut in 2008 and would later become known as "Rush". Another of his brothers, Carlos, became a professional wrestler in 2011, adopting the masked character Dragon Lee initially. In 2012, the original Dragon Lee was offered the opportunity to take over the Místico character after the original wrestler under the Místico mask left Mexico. It was public knowledge that Dragon Lee had taken over the Místico character, leaving the mask and character of Dragon Lee behind. Muñoz's uncles are also professional wrestlers, known as Franco Columbo, Pit Bull I, and Pit Bull II; they all had a hand in training Muñoz prior to his professional wrestling debut. At the age of 14, his father took him to Mexico City to start training in amateur wrestling, participating in several wrestling events. He would also participate in boxing; as Muñoz recalls in a 2015 interview, he was disqualified during his first match for performing a suplex (a wrestling throw) on his opponent. At that point, he realized that his future was in professional wrestling.

== Professional wrestling career ==
=== Consejo Mundial de Lucha Libre (2013–2019) ===
==== Generacion 2014 (2013–2014) ====
Muñoz began training in Consejo Mundial de Lucha Libre's (CMLL) gym in 2013, making his first public appearance as Dragon Lee on November 20, winning the beginners category of CMLL's 2013 Bodybuilding Contest. He made his in-ring debut on January 1, 2014, in the La Copa Junior ("The Junior Cup") tournament, eliminating Herodes Jr. before being the third man eliminated by Cachorro. Lee was referred to as part of CMLL's Generacion 2014, a group of wrestlers who all made their debut around January 2014, also including Black Panther, Cachorro, Espiritu Negro, Flyer, Hechicero, El Rebelde and Star Jr. A month later, he was paired with older brother Rush in the Torneo Gran Alternativa ("Great Alternative Tournament"), an annual tag team tournament where a rookie teams up with an experienced wrestler. They defeated Negro Casas and Canelo Casas in the first round and Herodes Jr. and Shocker in the quarter-finals, before losing to Bárbaro Cavernario and Mr. Niebla in the semi-finals.

On March 25, Lee was one of sixteen wrestlers in a torneo cibernetico elimination match, hoping to qualify for one of eight spots in CMLL's annual En Busca de un Ídolo ("In Search of an Idol") tournament. Lee, alongside Cachorro, Cavernario, Guerrero Negro Jr., Hechicero, Star Jr., Soberano Jr. and Super Halcón Jr., survived and qualified. The first round consisted of a round-robin tournament where he wrestled against all other participants, after which each wrestler was given points by a panel of judges and from an online poll. The first round saw Lee in fourth place with 423 points following victories over Cachorro, Guerrero Negro Jr. and Soberano Jr., qualifying him for the second round along with Cavernario, Hechicero and Cachorro. Lee ended in third place with 198 points by only defeating Cachorro. At the CMLL 81st Anniversary Show on September 19, Lee teamed with Cachorro and Blue Panther to defeat Felino, Puma and Tiger. On December 9, he unsuccessfully challenged Virus for the CMLL World Lightweight Championship.

==== Feuds with Kamaitachi and La Máscara (2015–2017) ====
In early 2015, Lee started a storyline rivalry with Japanese wrestler Kamaitachi after having faced each other many times the previous year. They were paired for the Torneo Nacional de Parejas Increíbles ("National Incredible Pairs Tournament"), where rivals team together, but lost in the first round to Mephisto and La Máscara on February 20, after which Kamaitachi stole Lee's mask. The rivalry culminated on March 20 at Homenaje a Dos Leyendas ("Homage to Two Legends") in a mask vs. mask Lucha de Apuestas ("bet match"), where Lee defeated Kamaitachi, forcing him to unmask. On April 5, Lee defeated Virus for the CMLL World Lightweight Championship, his first professional wrestling championship. On May 15, Lee outlasted Cavernario, Fuego, Kamaitachi, Luciferno, Mephisto, Místico, Niebla Roja, The Panther, Titán, Virus and Volador Jr. to win the first round torneo cibernetico of the Leyenda de Plata ("The Silver Legend") tournament, but lost to Negro Casas in the finals on May 22. Over the following months, Lee successfully defended the title against Kamaitachi on four occasions. On September 18, Lee, Místico and Valiente defeated Casas, Cavernario and Mr. Niebla at the CMLL 82nd Anniversary Show. By virtue of holding a title, he participated in the Universal Championship tournament on October 2, defeating Luciferno in the first round, but lost to Shocker in the quarter-finals.

At Homenaje a Dos Leyendas on March 18, 2016, Lee, Máscara Dorada, Místico and Valiente defeated Fujin, Kamaitaichi, Okumura and Raijin. Lee and La Máscara were paired for the Torneo Nacional de Parejas Increibles on April 22, defeating El Terrible and Máximo in the first round before losing to Atlantis and Gran Guerrero in the quarter-finals. They began a feud in the summer, which sprung from La Máscara's feud with the entire Muñoz family after the dissolution of he and Rush's stable, Los Ingobernables ("The Ungovernables"); the feud initially focused on Rush and La Máscara before shifting from Rush to Lee. On September 2, at the CMLL 83rd Anniversary Show, Lee defeated La Máscara in a Lucha de Apuestas to win the second mask of his career. On October 21, Lee participated in that year's Universal Championship tournament, defeating Luciferno in the first round, before losing to La Máscara in the quarter-finals. They were again paired for the Torneo Nacional de Parejas Increíbles on February 17, 2017, losing to Último Guerrero and Valiente in the first round.

==== Final storylines and departure (2017–2019) ====
Lee, Stuka Jr. and Titán defeated Los Guerreros Laguneros (Euforia, Guerrero and Niebla Roja) at Homenaje a Dos Leyendas on March 17. He competed in the Reyes del Aire ("Kings of the Air") tournament, but was eliminated from the torneo cibernetico on April 7 by Hechicero. Nine days later, he successfully defended the CMLL World Lightweight Championship against Cavernario. On November 24, Lee, Místico and Pierroth participated in the family-oriented Copa Dinastías ("Dynasties Cup") tournament, but lost to Nueva Generación Dinamita (El Cuatrero, Forastero and Sansón) in the finals. As part of their slowly developing feud, Lee and Sansón participated in the Torneo Nacional de Parejas Increíbles on February 9, 2018, losing to Carístico and Euforia in the first round. He, Místico and Rush defeated Forastero, Sansón and Máscara Año 2000 on March 16 at Homenaje a Dos Leyendas.

At Sin Piedad ("No Mercy") on January 1, 2019, Lee, Penta 0M and King Phoenix defeated El Cuatrero, Forastero and Templario. Lee then participated in that year's Universal Championship on February 2, where he defeated Forastero in the first round and Carístico in the quarter-finals, before losing to El Terrible in the semi-finals. On March 15, at Homenaje a Dos Leyendas, Lee, Caristico and Volador Jr. unsuccessfully challenged Los Guerreros Laguneros for the CMLL World Trios Championship. Four days later, Lee became a double champion, defeating Mephisto for the CMLL World Welterweight Championship. On August 5, he received the opportunity to become a triple champion, but failed to defeat Volador Jr. for the NWA World Historic Welterweight Championship. On September 27, CMLL announced that they had fired both Lee and Rush for not following guidelines set by the programming department. According to Dave Meltzer, CMLL was not happy with Lee, who participated in Pro Wrestling Guerrilla (PWG)'s Battle of Los Angeles after they told him to not work in the tournament.

=== New Japan Pro-Wrestling (2016–2020) ===
In January 2016, Dragon Lee made his Japanese debut by taking part in the CMLL and New Japan Pro-Wrestling (NJPW) co-produced Fantastica Mania 2016 tour. On the fifth show of the tour, he successfully defended the CMLL World Lightweight Championship against Virus. After the match, Lee was attacked by Kamaitachi, which led to a match the following day, where Lee lost the CMLL World Lightweight Championship. Lee regained the championship from Kamaitachi on March 4 when the two had a rematch in Mexico City.

On January 5, 2017, Lee made a surprise return to NJPW at New Year Dash!!, attacking Hiromu Takahashi (the former Kamaitachi) and Tetsuya Naito during their match against Kushida and Michael Elgin. Following the match, Dragon Lee posed with Takahashi's IWGP Junior Heavyweight Championship belt. He also took part in the Fantastica Mania 2017 tour, successfully defending the CMLL World Lightweight Championship against Bárbaro Cavernario on January 20. Lee unsuccessfully challenged Takahashi for the Junior Heavyweight Championship on February 11 at The New Beginning in Osaka. In May, Lee realized one of his goals in professional wrestling, when he was announced as a participant in the 2017 Best of the Super Juniors tournament. In his opening match of the tournament on May 17, Lee handed Takahashi his first singles loss since returning to Japan at the end of 2016. Lee finished the tournament on May 31 with a record of four wins and three losses, failing to advance to the finals. Lee returned to NJPW in October, teaming with Titán in the 2017 Super Jr. Tag Tournament, from which they were eliminated in the first round by Bushi and Takahashi. At Power Struggle on November 5, he and Titán lost to The Young Bucks. In May 2018, NJPW announced Lee as a participant in the 2018 Best of the Super Juniors tournament. He finished the tournament with three wins and four losses, failing to advance to the finals. At G1 Special in San Francisco on July 7, Lee again unsuccessfully challenged Takahashi for the Junior Heavyweight Championship.

At G1 Supercard on April 6, 2019, Lee defeated Taiji Ishimori and Bandido in a triple threat match to win the Junior Heavyweight Championship for the first time, and in the process, became the third Mexican to hold the title (behind Juventud Guerrera and Místico, who were the first and second, respectively). He successfully defended the title against Ishimori on Night 1 of Wrestling Dontaku on May 3, but lost it to Will Ospreay on June 9 at Dominion 6.9 in Osaka-jo Hall. In August, he participated in the Super J-Cup tournament, defeating Yoh in the first round, Ryusuke Taguchi in the quarter-finals and Caristico in the semi-finals, before losing to El Phantasmo in the finals. On December 8, Dragon Lee, now having changed his ring name to Ryu Lee, reportedly signed a one-year deal with NJPW and challenged Jyushin Thunder Liger to a match at Wrestle Kingdom 14. At the event on January 5, 2020, he teamed with Takahashi to defeat Liger and Naoki Sano in Liger's retirement match. On February 9, Lee, in his final NJPW appearance, failed to win the Junior Heavyweight Championship from Takahashi at The New Beginning in Osaka.

=== Ring of Honor (2016–2021) ===
Dragon Lee made his Ring of Honor (ROH) debut on September 30, 2016, at All Star Extravaganza VIII, defeating Kamaitachi. On December 2, at Final Battle, Lee unsuccessfully challenged Marty Scurll in a three-way match for the ROH World Television Championship also involving Will Ospreay. At Manhattan Mayhem VI on March 4, 2017, he defeated Ospreay. On April 1, Lee and Jay White lost to Ospreay and Volador Jr. at Supercard of Honor XI. At Final Battle on December 15, Lee, Flip Gordon and Titán unsuccessfully challenged Adam Page and The Young Bucks for the ROH World Six-Man Tag Team Championship. After G1 Supercard, Dalton Castle (who lost to Rush at the event) challenged Lee to a match at Best in the World on June 28, 2019, which Lee lost. He was a surprise entrant in a four-way match for Shane Taylor's ROH World Television Championship on September 27 at Death Before Dishonor XVII, where Taylor retained the title. On December 13, at Final Battle, Dragon Lee defeated Taylor to win the title.

Following the event, he joined his brother Rush, Amy Rose and Kenny King in forming La Faccion Ingobernable, turning heel. Their first match saw them defeat Villain Enterprises (Brody King, Marty Scurll and PCO) at Honor Reigns Supreme on January 12, 2020. At Bound By Honor on February 28, Lee unsuccessfully challenged PCO for the ROH World Championship. At Final Battle on December 18, he successfully defended his title against Tony Deppen. On February 26, 2021, Lee and King defeated The Foundation (Jay Lethal and Jonathan Gresham) to win the ROH World Tag Team Championship, making Lee a dual champion. He was scheduled to defend the ROH World Television Championship against Foundation member Tracy Williams on March 26 at the ROH 19th Anniversary Show, but was pulled from the show due to a broken eardrum. King lost the title on Lee's behalf to Williams, as well as dropping the tag team championship to Williams and Rhett Titus. At Best in the World on July 11, Lee defeated Deppen to regain the Television title. On September 10, he and King defeated Chris Dickinson and Homicide to regain the tag team championship, but lost it to The OGK (Matt Taven and Mike Bennett) at Honor for All on November 14. Five days later, he lost the Television title to Dalton Castle. Lee made his final appearance on December 11 at Final Battle, defeating Rey Horus.

=== Independent circuit (2018–2022) ===
On June 8, 2018, Dragon Lee appeared at PCW Ultra's Opposites Attack pay-per-view, unsuccessfully challenging Shane Strickland for the PCW Ultra Light Heavyweight Championship. On July 6, Lee competed in the All Pro Wrestling/Pro Wrestling Revolution jointly promoted "King of Indies" tournament, defeating Ryusuke Taguchi in the first round, Brody King in the semi-finals and Flip Gordon in the finals to win the tournament. In September 2019, Lee participated in PWG's Battle of Los Angeles tournament, defeating Rey Horus in the first round and Jake Atlas in the second round, before losing to Bandido in the third round. He also won the 2022 "King of Indies" tournament by defeating his brother Dralístico and SB KENTo in the three-way finals.

=== Lucha Libre AAA Worldwide (2019, 2021–2022) ===
On November 7, 2019, Lucha Libre AAA Worldwide (AAA) announced that Lee would challenge Kenny Omega for the AAA Mega Championship at Triplemanía Regia on December 1, where he was defeated in his debut.

Lee, accompanied by his brother Dralístico, returned to AAA on October 9, 2021, at Héroes Inmortales XIV, challenging Los Lucha Bros (Fénix and Pentagón Jr.) for the AAA World Tag Team Championship. At Triplemanía Regia II on December 4, they defeated Laredo Kid and Willie Mack. At Triplemanía XXX on October 15, 2022, they defeated the teams of Arez and Mack, Komander and Myzteziz Jr. and Los Vipers (Látigo and Toxin) to become the number one contenders for the titles. On December 28, at Noche de Campeones ("Night of Champions"), Lee and Dralístico defeated FTR (Cash Wheeler and Dax Harwood) to win the AAA World Tag Team Championship. The title was eventually vacated in January 2023.

=== All Elite Wrestling (2022) ===
Lee made his All Elite Wrestling (AEW) debut on the August 17 edition of Dynamite, participating in the first round of the AEW World Trios Championship tournament, where he teamed with La Facción Ingobernable members Andrade El Idolo and his brother Rush to face The Young Bucks and their mystery partner, Kenny Omega, who pinned Lee. After the match, El Idolo and Rush attacked Lee and removed his mask.

=== WWE (2022–present) ===
==== NXT North American Champion (2022–2024) ====
On December 28, 2022, immediately after he and Dralístico won the AAA World Tag Team Championship at Noche de Campeones, Lee announced that he had signed a contract with WWE, and that he expected to start working with them in January 2023. He made his on-screen debut on March 7, 2023, at NXT Roadblock. Lee was chosen as one of Wes Lee's opponents in a fatal five-way match for the NXT North American Championship at NXT Stand & Deliver on April 1, which he lost. At NXT Battleground on May 28, Lee unsuccessfully challenged Noam Dar for the NXT Heritage Cup due to interference from Jakara Jackson and Lash Legend.

From August to December, his first storyline in WWE was a feud with NXT North American Champion Dominik Mysterio, who Lee faced several times for the title on NXT and Raw in a losing effort. Lee began to appear on SmackDown in September and was quietly drafted to the brand. He replaced Carlito in his match against Santos Escobar at Survivor Series: WarGames on November 25, but was defeated. At NXT Deadline on December 9, Lee defeated Dominik to win the NXT North American Championship, marking his first title win in WWE. On the following episode of NXT, Lee made his first successful title defense against Tyler Bate. On the January 9, 2024 episode of NXT, Lee successfully retained his title against Lexis King. After the match, Oba Femi cashed in his NXT Breakout Tournament contract and defeated Lee to win the title, ending his reign at 31 days. On February 4, at Vengeance Day, Lee failed to win back the title from Femi in his rematch.

==== Latino World Order (2024–present) ====
The following month, Lee became an official member of the Latino World Order and was scheduled to team up with Rey Mysterio against Escobar and Dominik at WrestleMania XL. However, Lee was found attacked backstage, which rendered him unable to compete in the match; he was replaced by Andrade. On the April 26 episode of SmackDown, Lee made his return from the attack and teamed with Mysterio to defeat Los Lotharios (Angel and Berto). After the match, Escobar revealed that it was Carlito who had attacked Lee. Carlito then proceeded to attack both Lee and Mysterio after Escobar's revelation.

At Night 2 of the 2024 WWE Draft, LWO were drafted to the Raw brand. In October, Lee entered the Speed Championship #1 contender's tournament, defeating Tavion Heights and Akira Tozawa in the quarter-finals and semi-finals, respectively. He then received a bye to the championship match, where he defeated Andrade to win the WWE Speed Championship during the November 15 tapings of Speed, which aired on November 20. He lost the title on May 5, 2025, to El Grande Americano. On July 25, Lee made his return to AAA (now the sister promotion of WWE), where he, Dominik and El Grande Americano accepted the open challenge of AAA Mega Champion El Hijo del Vikingo, leading to a four-way match for the title at Triplemanía XXXIII on August 16, which was won by Vikingo. On September 27, he defeated Vikingo and Americano in a triple threat match to become the number one contender for the title at Héroes Inmortales XVII. On the October 20 episode of Raw, Lee and AJ Styles won the World Tag Team Championship by defeating The Judgment Day (Finn Bálor and JD McDonagh). Five days later, at Héroes Inmortales XVII, he failed to win the AAA Mega Championship from Dominik. At Saturday Night's Main Event XLII on December 13, Lee and Styles defeated Je'Von Evans and Leon Slater. They lost the titles to The Usos (Jey Uso and Jimmy Uso) on the December 29 episode of Raw, ending their reign at 70 days.

At Royal Rumble on January 31, 2026, Lee entered the titular match at number 19 and was eliminated by Bronson Reed. He unsuccessfully challenged Penta for the Intercontinental Championship on the March 16 episode of Raw and in a ladder match on Night 2 of WrestleMania 42 on April 19.

On the August 31 episode of Raw, Lee defeated Ethan Page to become Number One Contender for the Intercontinental Championship. At Raw at Mexico City on September 14, Lee failed to win the title from Chad Gable.

== Personal life ==
In December 2019, Muñoz married his fiancée, Lupita Orozco; the wedding was officiated by Fray Tormenta. The couple have two daughters together.

== In other media ==
In the late summer of 2018, Dragon Lee was one of the participants in the Mexican version of the Exathlon sports reality show. He was part of the "celebrity/athlete" Exathlon team, competing against a team of amateurs that was shown several days a week on the Mexican Azteca Uno television station. Due to the show, Dragon Lee did not wrestle between August 15 and December 13, 2018. He was eliminated from the show on November 20, for medical reasons, as he was suffering from a severe ear infection that threatened his hearing. He later revealed that he had been advised that he may need surgery on his ear and nose. He also revealed that he had lost 19 kg (42 lb) during the show as he was not allowed to eat the same amount of food as he did while staying in wrestling shape.

Dragon Lee made his video game debut in WWE 2K24 as downloadable content.

== Professional wrestling style and persona ==
Muñoz's "Dragon Lee" ring character is that of a tecnico or the good guy; in lucha libre, the traditional good guy/bad guy divide is still maintained much stricter than most other countries in the 21st century. His wrestling style, which earned him the nickname "El Niño Maravilla" ("The Boy Wonder"), is a high speed, high flying version of lucha libre, where he will take higher risks than a lot of wrestlers when executing moves off the top rope or from inside the ring to the outside. One of his signature finishing moves is the "Dragon Driver", also known as the "Phoenix-Plex" – a bridging package fallaway powerbomb where he lifts his opponent up, hooks his legs in a "package" position and then falls backwards so the opponent is slammed to the ground, holding them there for a pinfall. He also often uses a running frankensteiner throw where he leaps over the top rope and executes the leg scissor takedown on an opponent standing on the apron, sending him to the floor. The Phoenix-Plex is one of the riskier professional wrestling moves, designed to look like it hurts the opponent without actually inflicting too much pain, but can go wrong when the person executing or the person taking the move makes a mistake. That risk was highlighted in a match between Dragon Lee and Hiromu Takahashi at G1 Special in San Francisco, where Lee released Takahashi too early, causing him to land on his neck and break it. After the retirement of tag team partner AJ Styles, Lee paid homage to Styles by using his "Styles Clash" as a finisher.

== Championships and accomplishments ==
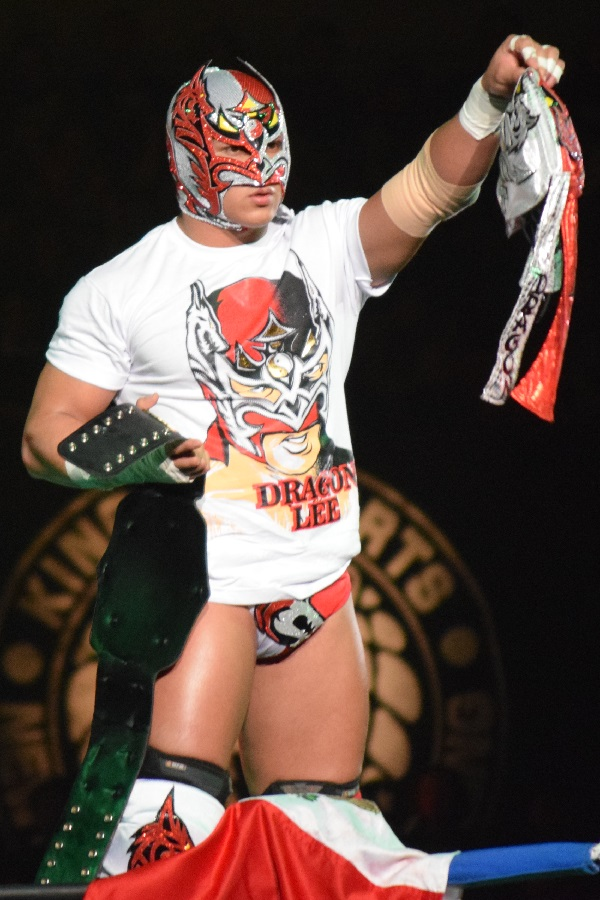
Lee is a two-time CMLL World Lightweight Champion.

- All Pro Wrestling
  - King of the Indies tournament (2018, 2019)
- Mas Lucha
  - Mas Lucha Supremo Tournament (2022)
- Consejo Mundial de Lucha Libre
  - CMLL World Lightweight Championship (2 times)
  - CMLL World Welterweight Championship (1 time)
  - CMLL Bodybuilding Contest: Beginners Category (2013)
  - CMLL Bodybuilding Contest: Intermediate Category (2014, 2015)
- ESPN
  - Ranked No. 17 of the 30 best Pro Wrestlers Under 30 in 2023
- Lucha Libre AAA Worldwide
  - AAA World Tag Team Championship (1 time) – with Dralístico
- The Crash Lucha Libre
  - The Crash Tag Team Championship (1 time) – with Dralístico
- Kaoz Lucha Libre
  - Kaoz Tag Team Championship (1 time) – with Dralístico
- Mucha Lucha Atlanta
  - MLA Heavyweight Championship (1 time)
- New Japan Pro-Wrestling
  - IWGP Junior Heavyweight Championship (1 time)
  - Torneo de Parejas Familiares (2019) – with Místico
- Pro Wrestling Illustrated
  - Ranked No. 41 of the top 500 singles wrestlers in the PWI 500 in 2021
- Pro Wrestling Revolution
  - PWR Tag Team Championship (1 time) – with Dralístico
  - King of Indies (2022)
- Ring of Honor
  - ROH World Television Championship (2 times)
  - ROH World Tag Team Championship (2 times) – with Kenny King
- Wrestling Observer Newsletter
  - Rookie of the Year (2014)
- WWE
  - WWE Speed Championship (1 time)
  - NXT North American Championship (1 time)
  - World Tag Team Championship (1 time) – with AJ Styles
  - WWE Speed Championship #1 Contender Tournament (October 16–November 20, 2024)

== Luchas de Apuestas record ==
Winner (wager)	Loser (wager)	Location	Event	Date	Notes
Dragon Lee (mask)	Kamaitachi (mask)	Mexico City	Homenaje a Dos Leyendas	March 20, 2015	
Dragon Lee (mask)	La Máscara (mask)	Mexico City	CMLL 83rd Anniversary Show	September 2, 2016	
