= CMLL Torneo Nacional de Parejas Increíbles (2017) =

2017 Consejo Mundial de Lucha Libre event

- Promotion: Consejo Mundial de Lucha Libre
- Date: February 10, 2017; February 17, 2017; February 24, 2017
- City: Mexico City, Mexico
- Venue: Arena México

Event chronology
← Previous; Fantastica Mania	Next → Homenaje a Dos Leyendas

CMLL Torneo Nacional de Parejas Increibles tournaments chronology
← Previous; 2016	Next → 2018

The CMLL Torneo Nacional de Parejas Increíbles 2017 or "National Incredible Pairs Tournament 2017" was a tag team Lucha Libre tournament held by the Mexican wrestling promotion Consejo Mundial de Lucha Libre (CMLL). The tournament is based on the Lucha Libre Parejas Increíbles match concept, which pairs two wrestlers of opposite allegiance, one portraying a villain, referred to as a "rudo" in Lucha Libre wrestling terminology, and one portraying a fan favorites, or "técnico". The 2017 version of the tournament was the eight time in a row that CMLL held the tournament since the first tournament in 2010. The winners are presented with a trophy but not given any other tangible reward for the victory.

Sixteen teams competed in the three night tournament, with Volador Jr. and Bárbaro Cavernario winning Block A held on February 10, 2017, and the team of Último Guerrero and Valiente winning Block B a week later on February 17, 2017. Finally Volador Jr. and Bárbaro Cavernario won the finals on February 24, 2017 to take the entire tournament. It was Bárbaro Cavernario's first Torneo Nacional de Parejas Increíbles victory while Volador Jr. previously won the 2013 tournament with La Sombra.

== History ==
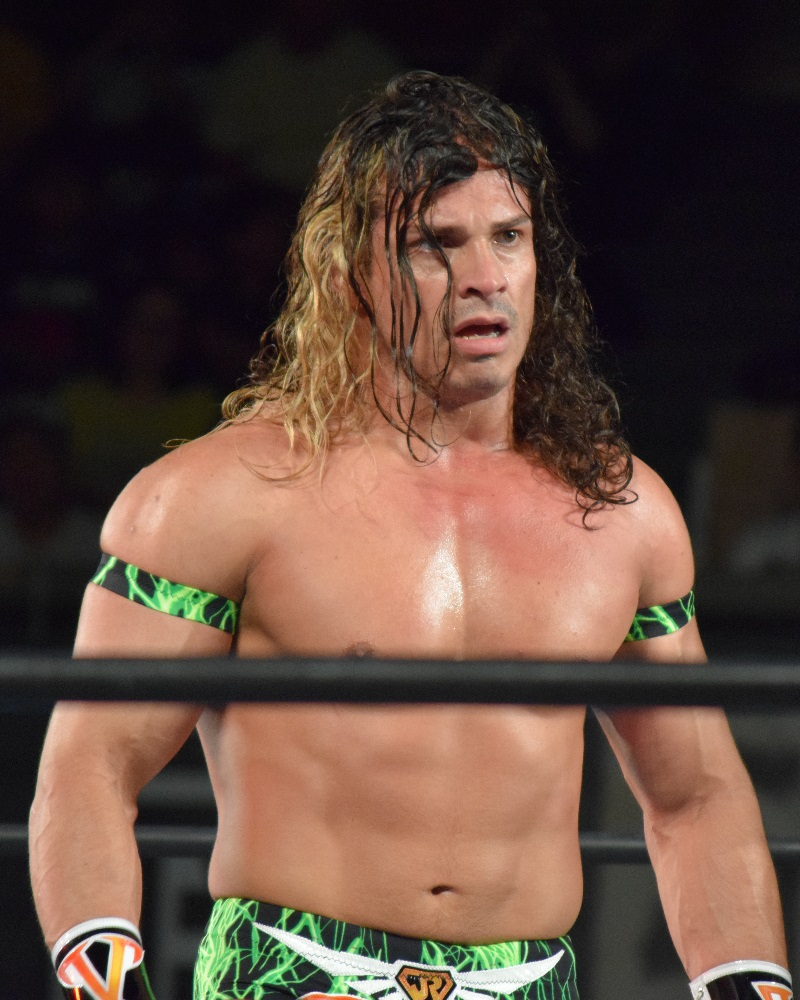
Volador Jr., the tecnico winner of the 2017 tournament.

The Mexican professional wrestling promotion Consejo Mundial de Lucha Libre (CMLL; "World Wrestling Council") held their first Torneo Nacional de Parejas Increíbles ("National Incredible Pairs Tournament") in 2010, from January 22 through February 5, marking the beginning of an annual tournament. CMLL has previous held Parejas Increíbles tournaments on an irregular basis and often promoted individual Parejas Increíbles and Relevos Increíbles ("Incredible Relay", with teams of three or more wrestlers). The Parejas Increíbles concept is a long-standing tradition in lucha libre and is at times referred to as a "strange bedfellows" match in English speaking countries, because a Pareja Increible consists of a face (referred to as a técnico in Lucha Libre, or a "good guy") and a heel (a rudo, those that portray "the bad guys") teamed up for a specific match, or in this case for a tournament. The 2017 tournament will be the eight annual Parejas Increíbles tournament, and like its predecessors will be part of CMLL's regular Friday night CMLL Super Viernes ("Super Friday") shows to be held in Arena México, CMLL's main venue in Mexico City, Mexico.

== Tournament ==
The tournament featured 15 professional wrestling matches with different wrestlers teaming up, some of whom were involved in pre-existing scripted feuds or storylines while others were simply paired up for the tournament. For the Torneo Nacional de Parejas Increíbles tournaments, CMLL often teamed up a técnico (those that portray the "good guys" in wrestling, also known as faces) and a rudo (the "bad guy" or heels) who are involved in a pre-existing storyline feud at the time of the tournament so that the tournament itself can be used as a storytelling device to help tell the story of escalating confrontations between two feuding wrestlers. The tournament format followed CMLL's traditional tournament formats, with two qualifying blocks of eight teams that competed during the first and second week of the tournament and a final match between the two block winners. The qualifying blocks were all one-fall matches while the tournament final was a best two-out-of-three-falls tag team match.

=== Tournament participants ===
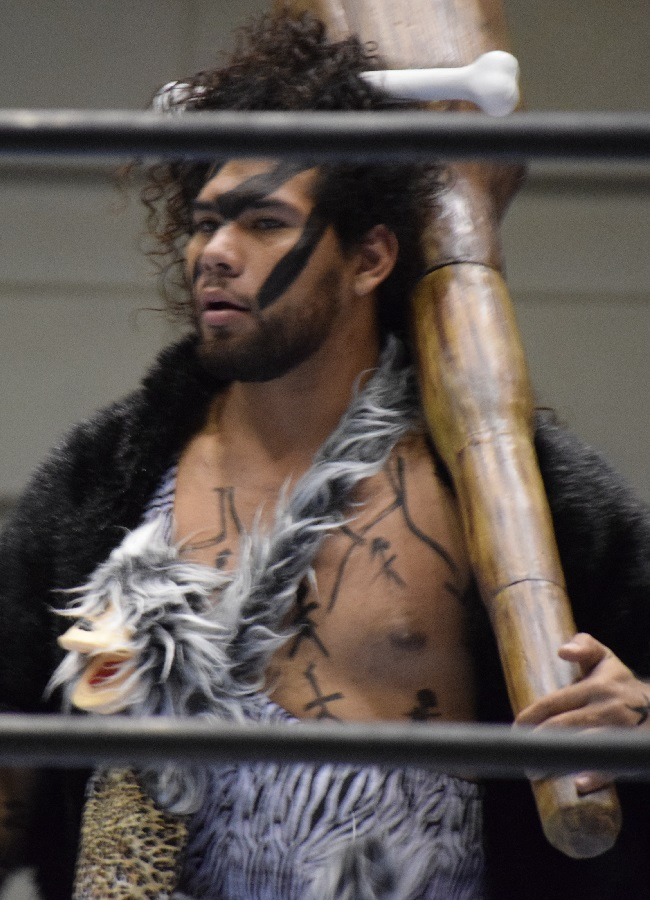
Bárbaro Cavernario, the rudo winner of the 2017 tournament.

Block A

- Ángel de Oro (T) and Rey Bucanero (R)
- Blue Panther (T) and Tiger (R)
- Carístico (T) and Mephisto (R)
- Marco Corleone (T) and Kráneo (R)
- Máximo Sexy (T) and Máscara Año 2000 (R)
- Diamante Azul (T) and Pierroth (R)
- Rey Cometa (T) and Puma (R)
- Volador Jr. (T) and Bárbaro Cavernario (R)

Block B

- Atlantis (T) and Euforia (R)
- Dragon Lee (T) and La Máscara (R)
- Guerrero Maya Jr. (T) and Dragón Rojo Jr. (R)
- Místico (T) and Negro Casas(R)
- Stuka Jr. (T) and Hechicero (R)
- Titán (T) and Ripper (R)
- Rush (T) and El Terrible (R)
- Valiente (T) and Último Guerrero (R)

=== Ongoing storylines ===
One of the main CMLL feuds at the time of the 2017 Parejas Increibles tournament was the ongoing rivalry between Diamante Azul and Pierroth, a feud that at the time of the tournament was expected to be the main event of the 2017 Homenaje a Dos Leyendas ("Homage to two legends") show. The feud often saw Pierroth, with help from his Los Ingobernables partners Rush and La Máscara, leave Diamante Azul beaten up and with his mask either torn or completely removed during matches.

While Atlantis and Euforia were not directly involved in a feud the team had some history prior to the 2017 tournament. Originally Atlantis was part of Los Guerreros del Infierno, which also included EUforia. He would later leave the team, turning tecnico to feud with Último Guerrero, the leader of Los Guerreros. Atlantis teamed with Euforia to win the 2014 tournament.

While some of the teams were put together because of ongoing storylines others were teamed up based on previous feuds. The team of Rey Cometa and Puma, played off a storyline rivalry between the two from 2012. During the fall of 2012 the two masked mid-card wrestlers developed a rivalry that led to both wrestlers putting their mask on the line as part of CMLL's 79th Anniversary Show. Rey Cometa was defeated by Puma and thus had to take off his mask and reveal his birth name. Following the mask loss Rey Cometa and Puma moved off in different directions, only crossing path on occasions. Another dormant story-line was the feud between Dragon Lee and La Máscara that carried the main event match of the CMLL 83rd Anniversary Show, which saw Dragon Lee defeating and unmasking La Máscara at the end of the night. Following the match La Máscara and Dragon Lee's brother Rush, reformed Los Ingobernables and actually attacked Dragon Lee.

The team of Rush and El Terrible had teamed together in two previous Parejas Increibles tournaments, both as part of a long, heated storyline feud between the two that ran from 2011 through 2012. The storyline saw El Terrible defeat Rush to win the vacant CMLL World Heavyweight Championship, The two were teamed up for the 2012 Torneo Nacional de Parejas Increibles as CMLL continued to build the feud. The two were able to work together well enough to make it to the finals of the tournament but lost to Atlantis and Euforia in the finals when they were unable to get along. After the loss Rush made a Lucha de Apuestas challenge to El Terrible. The storyline culminated on September 14 in the main event of CMLL's 79th Anniversary Show, where El Terrible lost and as a result, shaved bald. In March, 2013 El Terrible and Rush teamed up for the 2013 Torneo de Parejas Increibles like they had for the 2012 tournament, but the team lost in the first round to Dragón Rojo, Jr. and Niebla Roja.

=== Tournament brackets ===
Round of 16
Máximo Sexy and Máscara Año 2000	W
Blue Panther and Tiger
Volador Jr. and Bárbaro Cavernario	W
Rey Cometa and Puma
Diamante Azul and Pierroth	W
Marco Corleone and Kráneo
Ángel de Oro and Rey Bucanero
Carístico and Mephisto	W
Atlantis and Euforia	W
Guerrero Maya Jr. and Dragón Rojo Jr.
Stuka Jr. and Hechicero
Rush and El Terrible	W
Dragón Lee and La Máscara
Valiente and Último Guerrero	W
Místico and Negro Casas	W
Titán and Ripper

Quarterfinals
Máximo Sexy and Máscara Año 2000
Volador Jr. and Bárbaro Cavernario	W
Diamante Azul and Pierroth
Carístico and Mephisto	W
Atlantis and Euforia	W
Rush and El Terrible
Último Guerrero and Valiente	W
Místico and Negro Casas

Semifinals
Volador Jr. and Bárbaro Cavernario	W
Carístico and Mephisto
Atlantis and Euforia
Último Guerrero and Valiente	W

Finals
Volador Jr. and Bárbaro Cavernario	W
Último Guerrero and Valiente

== Aftermath ==
The rivalry between Pierroth and Diamante Azul reached its peak only a few weeks later as the two faced off in a Lucha de Apuestas', or "bet match" on March 17, 2017 in the main event of the 2017 Homenaje a Dos Leyendas show. Diamante Azul won the match and forced Pierroth to unmask afterwards per lucha libre traditions.
