= TRT: La Máquina de la Destrucción =

Professional wrestling stable

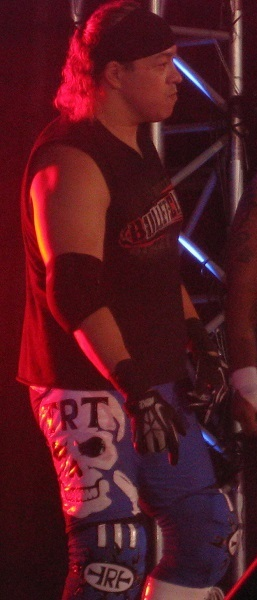
- TRT member Rey Bucanero

Stable
- Members: El Terrible; Rey Bucanero; Shocker
- Names: La Fuerza TRT; Bullet Club Latinoamerica; TRT: La Máquina de la Destrucción; TGR
- Billed heights: El Terrible: 1.85 m (6 ft 1 in); Rey Bucanero: 1.78 m (5 ft 10 in); Vangelis: 1.82 m (5 ft 11 1/2 in)
- Combined billed weight: El Terrible: 106 kg (234 lb); Rey Bucanero: 94 kg (207 lb); Vangelis: 95 kg (209 lb)
- Former members: El Texano Jr.; Tiger; Tama Tonga; Vangelis
- Debut: April 2011
- Years active: 2011–2015

TRT: La Máquina de la Destrucción (Spanish for "TRT: The Machine of Destruction") was a Mexican professional wrestling group, also known as a "stable" in wrestling terms, that has been active in promotion Consejo Mundial de Lucha Libre (CMLL) since April, 2011. The group consisted of El Texano, Rey Bucanero and Vangelis. The group was originally known as La Fuerza TRT consisting of El Terrible, Rey Bucanero and El Texano, Jr. In 2013 the group was briefly billed as Bullet Club Latinoamerica when El Terrible and Rey Bucanero teamed up with New Japan Pro-Wrestling Bullet Club member Tama Tonga. For a while Tiger was a member of the group but was kicked out in 2013. The group has always worked as Rudos (term for the "bad guys") and often in the main event of some of CMLL's major shows.

== La Fuerza TRT (2011–2013) ==
In early 2011 Rey Bucanero decided to leave the La Peste Negra ("The Black Plague") stable, wanting to get away from the more comedic ring characters that La Peste Negra portrayed. In April of that year El Terrible and El Texano Jr. broke away from the stable Los Hijos del Averno ("The Sons of Hell") and began teaming regularly with Rey Bucanero. The following month, the group was named La Fuerza TRT. The following month, the group was named La Fuerza TRT ("TRT Power"), after the initials of the three team members. On June 21 Bucanero defeated El Hijo del Fantasma to win the NWA World Historic Light Heavyweight Championship, the first championship victory as a part of Fuerza TRT. On September 30 at CMLL's 78th Anniversary Show all three members were part of the main event multi-man steel cage match that also included Rush, Mr. Águila, El Felino, Héctor Garza, Máximo, Blue Panther and Negro Casas. The match came down to Rey Bucanero and El Felino in the cage, with El Felino pinning Bucanero. Due to the loss Rey Bucanero had all his hair shaved off due to the Luchas de Apuestas ("Bet match") traditions. On November 22, 2011 El Texano, Jr. left CMLL to pursue a wrestling career outside of CMLL, leaving TRT a man short, A week later, Tiger was introduced as the new third member of La Fuerza TRT, chosen because of his initial and not because he had previously worked with El Terrible and Rey Bucanero, in fact he normally worked lower level matches than TRT. On December 25, El Terrible and Rush survived a torneo cibernetico match used to determine the two competitors in a match for the vacant CMLL World Heavyweight Championship. On January 1, 2012, El Terrible defeated Rush to win the CMLL World Heavyweight Championship for the first time. The following April, El Terrible and Euforia won the 2012 Gran Alternativa. On August 31, El Terrible defeated New Japan Pro-Wrestling representative Hiroshi Tanahashi to become the 2012 Universal Champion. El Terrible's rivalry with Rush culminated on September 14 in the main event of CMLL's 79th Anniversary Show, where El Terrible was defeated in a Lucha de Apuesta Hair vs. Hair match and, as a result, shaved bald.

== Bullet Club Latinoamerica (2013) ==
On November 13, 2012 El Terrible and Tama Tonga won the CMLL World Tag Team Championship from Atlantis and Diamante Azul. In early 2013 Tama Tonga returned to Japan to work for NJPW, putting the status of the CMLL World Tag Team Championship in the air, leaving El Terrible and Tonga as the champions but not able to defend the championship. On April 7 at NJPW's Invasion Attack show in Tokyo, El Terrible and Tonga successfully defended the CMLL World Tag Team Championship against La Máscara and Valiente. On June 4, 2013, Bucanero's near two-year reign as the NWA World Historic Light Heavyweight Champion ended, when he lost the title to Diamante Azul. On July 5, 2013 El Terrible returned for another two-week tour with New Japan and, during the first night, he and Tonga lost the CMLL World Tag Team Championship to Hiroshi Tanahashi and Jushin Thunder Liger. El Terrible worked the rest of the tour, which lasted until July 20, as a member of the villainous Bullet Club stable, forming a sub group called Bullet Club Latinoamerica with Tama and Rey Bucanero. On September 14, 2013 Rey Bucanero and Tama Tonga won the CMLL World Tag Team Championship from Tanahashi and Liger.

== TRT: La Máquina de la Destrucción (2013–2015) ==
In the summer of 2013 El Terrible and Bucanero kicked Tiger out of La Fuerza TRT and gave his spot over to Vangelis who had gained the team's attention by winning the 2013 En Busca de un Ídolo ("In Search of an Idol") tournament. With Vangelis joining the group, the stable was renamed TRT: La Máquina de la Destrucción ("TRT: The Machine of Destruction"). On October 18, Bucanero suffered an injury and was unable to compete for several months. As a result of the injury CMLL stripped the CMLL World Tag Team Championship, which was the end of Bullet Club Latinoamerica as a group.

Bucanero returned to the ring in 2014 and was one of 10 men in a Steel Cage Match in the main event of the 2014 Infierno en el Ring ("Inferno in the Ring"), a match that also included El Terrible, Bárbaro Cavernario, Blue Panther, Marco Corelone, El Felino Máximo, Shocker, Último Guerrero and Volador Jr. In the end Rey Bucanero pinned El Felino, reversing the result of the 78th Anniversary Show as Felino was shaved bald afterwards. After the cage match the rivalry between Rey Bucanero and Volador Jr. continued. El Terrible's three-year reign as the CMLL World Heavyweight Champion ended on January 30, 2015, when he lost the title to Máximo as part of a developing storyline feud between those two wrestlers. CMLL combined the two storylines as El Terrible and Rey Bucanero faced off against Máximo and Volador Jr. on a number of occasions. On March 6, El Terrible and Máximo won the 2015 Torneo Nacional de Parejas Increibles, defeating Rey Bucanero and Volador Jr. in the finals. On March 8, 2015, Bucanero defeated La Sombra in a tournament final to win the vacant NWA World Historic Light Heavyweight Championship for the second time.

== TGR (2015–2018) ==
On April 3, 2015, El Terrible and Rey Bucanero formed a new trio with Shocker named TGR (Terriblemente Guapo el Rey, "Terribly Handsome King").

== Championships and accomplishments ==
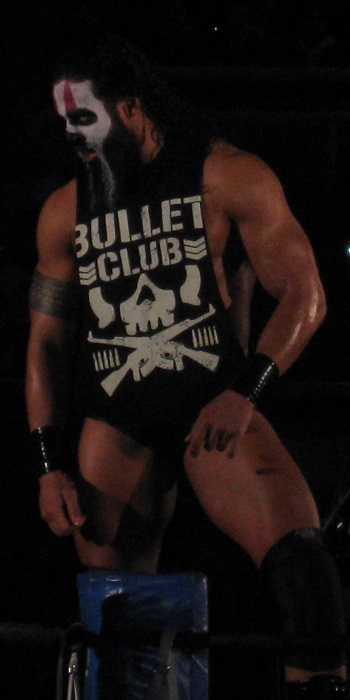
Tama Tonga held the CMLL World Tag Team Championship with two different TRT members

Note that only championships won while members of TRT are listed.

- Consejo Mundial de Lucha Libre
  - CMLL World Heavyweight Championship (1 time) – El Terrible
  - CMLL World Tag Team Championship (2 times) – El Terrible (with Tama Tonga), Rey Bucanero (with Tama Tonga)
  - CMLL Universal Championship (2012) – El Terrible
  - Copa Dos Leyendas (2012) – El Terrible
  - Copa Pachuca (2012) – El Terrible (with Rush)
  - NWA World Historic Light Heavyweight Championship (2 times)
  - Torneo Gran Alternativa (2012) – with El Terrible (with Euforia)
  - Torneo Nacional de Parejas Increibles (2015) – with El Terrible (with Máximo)

== Lucha de Apuesta record ==
Note that only Luchas de Apuestas won or lost while members of TRT are listed.

Winner (wager)	Loser (wager)	Location	Event	Date	Notes
El Felino (hair)	Rey Bucanero (hair)	Mexico City	CMLL 78th Anniversary Show	September 30, 2011	(Note: This was a 10-man steel cage match that also included Rush, Mr. Águila, El Terrible, El Texano, Jr., Héctor Garza, Máximo, Blue Panther and Negro Casas)
Rush (hair)	El Terrible (hair)	Mexico City	CMLL 79th Anniversary Show	September 14, 2012	
Rey Bucanero (hair)	El Felino (hair)	Mexico City	Infierno en el Ring	December 5, 2014	(Note: This was a 10-man steel cage match that also included Bárbaro Cavernario, Blue Panther, Marco Corelone, Máximo, Shocker, El Terrible, Último Guerrero and Volador Jr.)
Máximo and Volador Jr. (hair)	TRT: La Máquina de la Destrucción (hair) (El Terrible and Rey Bucanero)	Mexico City	Homenaje a Dos Leyendas	March 20, 2015	
