= Homenaje a Dos Leyendas (2017) =

Mexican professional wrestling supercard show

- Official poster for the event
- Promotion: Consejo Mundial de Lucha Libre
- Date: March 17, 2017
- City: Mexico City, Mexico
- Venue: Arena México

Pay-per-view chronology
| ← Previous; CMLL Torneo Nacional de Parejas Increíbles | Next → Reyes del Aire |

Homenaje a Dos Leyendas chronology
| ← Previous; 2016 | Next → 2018 |

Homenaje a Dos Leyendas (2017) (Spanish for "Homage to Two Legends") was a professional wrestling pay-per-view event, scripted and produced by Consejo Mundial de Lucha Libre (CMLL; "World Wrestling Council"). The Dos Leyendas show took place on March 17, 2017 in CMLL's main venue, Arena México, Mexico City, Mexico. The event was to honor and remember CMLL founder Salvador Lutteroth, who died in March 1987. Starting in 1999 CMLL honored not just their founder during the show, but also a second lucha libre legend, making it their version of a Hall of Fame event. For the 2017 show CMLL commemorated the life and career of Arturo Díaz Mendoza, better known under the ring name Villano III. This was the 19th March show held under the Homenaje a Dos Leyendas name, having previously been known as Homenaje a Salvador Lutteroth from 1996 to 1998.

The main event of the show was a Lucha de Apuestas, or bet match, where Diamante Azul defeated Pierroth, forcing Pierroth to unmask after the loss and state his birth name, Arturo Muñoz Sánchez. The Sky Team (Místico, Valiente and Volador Jr) successfully defend the CMLL World Trios Championship against Los Hijos del Infierno (Luciferno and Mephisto) and Hechicero. Último Guerrero successfully defended the NWA World Historic Middleweight Championship against Matt Taven in the fourth match of the night.

== Production ==
=== Background ===
Since 1996 the Mexican wrestling company Consejo Mundial de Lucha Libre (Spanish for "World Wrestling Council"; CMLL) has held a show in March each year to commemorate the passing of CMLL founder Salvador Lutteroth who died in March 1987. For the first three years the show paid homage to Lutteroth himself, from 1999 through 2004 the show paid homage to Lutteroth and El Santo, Mexico's most famous wrestler ever and from 2005 forward the show has paid homage to Lutteroth and a different leyenda ("Legend") each year, celebrating the career and accomplishments of past CMLL stars. Originally billed as Homenaje a Salvador Lutteroth, it has been held under the Homenaje a Dos Leyendas ("Homage to two legends") since 1999 and is the only show outside of CMLL's Anniversary shows that CMLL has presented every year since its inception. All Homenaje a Dos Leyendas shows have been held in Arena México in Mexico City, Mexico, which is CMLL's main venue, its "home". Traditionally CMLL holds their major events on Friday Nights, which means the Homenaje a Dos Leyendas shows replace their regularly scheduled Super Viernes show. The 2017 show was the 23rd overall Homenaje a Dos Leyendas show produced by CMLL.

=== Storylines ===
The Homenaje a Dos Leyendas show featured six professional wrestling matches with different wrestlers involved in pre-existing scripted feuds, plots and storylines. Wrestlers were portrayed as either heels (referred to as rudos in Mexico, those that portray the "bad guys") or faces (técnicos in Mexico, the "good guy" characters) as they followed a series of tension-building events, which culminated in a wrestling match or series of matches.

=== Homage to Salvador Lutteroth and Villano III ===
In September 1933 Salvador Lutteroth González founded Empresa Mexicana de Lucha Libre (EMLL), which would later be renamed Consejo Mundial de Lucha Libre. Over time Lutteroth would become responsible for building both Arena Coliseo in Mexico City and Arena Mexico, which became known as "The Cathedral of Lucha Libre". Over time EMLL became the oldest wrestling promotion in the world, with 2018 marking the 85th year of its existence. Lutteroth has often been credited with being the "father of Lucha Libre" introducing the concept of masked wrestlers to Mexico as well as the Luchas de Apuestas match. Lutteroth died on September 5, 1987. EMLL, late CMLL, remained under the ownership and control of the Lutteroth family as first Salvador's son Chavo Lutteroth and later his grandson Paco Alonso took over ownership of the company.

The life and achievements of Salvador Lutteroth is always honored at the annual Homenaje a Dos Leyendas show, since 1999 CMLL has also honored a second person, a Leyenda of lucha libre, in some ways CMLL's version of their Hall of Fame. In 2017 CMLL chose to honor Arturo Díaz Mendoza, best known under the ring name Villano III ("Villain 3") for his life and career in Lucha Libre. Arturo Mendoza was the middle son of wrestler/promoter Ray Mendoza, following José de Jesús Díaz Mendoza (a.k.a. Villano I) and José Alfredo Díaz Mendoz (Villano II) and younger brothers Raymundo Díaz Mendoza Jr. (Villano V) and Tomas Díaz Mendoza (Villano V). His career really took off when Ray Mendoza, Francisco Flores and Benjamin Mora Jr. broke away from CMLL to form the Universal Wrestling Association (UWA) where Arturo became one of the stars of their lighter weight divisions holding the UWA World Junior Heavyweight Championship, the UWA World Junior Light Heavyweight Championship, the UWA World Light Heavyweight Championship twice, the UWA World Welterweight Championship and the WWF Light Heavyweight Championship 7 times. (Note: Though Villano III won the title seven times, none of the reigns are officially recognized by the WWE. No reign prior to December 1997 is officially recognized by the WWE.) Over the years Villano III defended his mask in a multitude of Luchas de Apuestas matches, with more than 30 mask wins on his record, including unmasking Super Astro and Pegasus Kid. In late-1999/early-2000 Villano III started a storyline feud with Atlantis that led to both wrestlers putting their mask on the line at the 2000 Juicio Final. Villano III lost the match and his mask in what was voted as the Wrestling Observer Match of the Year for 2001. In subsequent years Arturo's career slowed down as age and injuries took a toll on him. He finally retired in 2015 due to diminishing eyesight and deteriorating knees.

== Aftermath ==
After his mask loss, Muñoz adopted the ring name "La Bestia del Ring", ("The Beast of the Ring" in English) and became an official member of Los Ingobernables. In the months after his mask loss, Muñoz became involved in a storyline feud with Vangelys, where Muñoz defeated Vangelys in a Lucha de Apuestas match, with Vangelys being shaved bald as a result.

Sky Team's run as CMLL World Trios Champions ended the following year on July 1 as they lost the championship to Los Guerreros del Infierno (Euforia, Gran Guerrero and Último Guerrero). Último Guerrero's NWA World Historic Middleweight Championship reign lasted for over a year, 522 days, until Carístico won the championship on August 21, 2018. His challenger, Matt Taven returned to CMLL for several tours over the following years, including winning and losing the NWA World Historic Welterweight Championship 1 time from Volador Jr., as well as team up with Volador Jr. to lose in the main event of the CMLL 85th Anniversary Show to Rush and Bárbaro Cavernario in a lucha de apuestas match.

== Results ==
| No. | Results | Stipulations |
|---|---|---|
| 1 | La Amapola, Tiffany and Zeuxis defeated Estrellita, Marcela and Princesa Sugehit | Six-woman "Lucha Libre rules" tag team match |
| 2 | Dragón Lee, Stuka Jr. and Titán defeated Los Guerreros Lagunero (Euforia, Gran Guerrero and Niebla Roja) | Six-man "Lucha Libre rules" tag team match |
| 3 | Los Ingobernables (La Máscara and Rush) and Kráneo defeated Atlantis, Carístico and Marco Corleone | Six-man "Lucha Libre rules" tag team match |
| 4 | Último Guerrero (c) defeated Matt Taven | Best two-out-of-three falls match for the NWA World Historic Middleweight Championship |
| 5 | Sky Team (Místico, Valiente and Volador Jr) (c) defeated Los Hijos del Infierno (Luciferno and Mephisto) and Hechicero | Six-man "Lucha Libre rules" tag team match for the CMLL World Trios Championship |
| 6 | Diamante Azul defeated Pierroth | Best two-out-of-three falls Lucha de Apuestas, mask vs. mask match |
(c) / – the champion(s) heading into the match
