= Volador Jr. =

Mexican professional wrestler (born 1981)

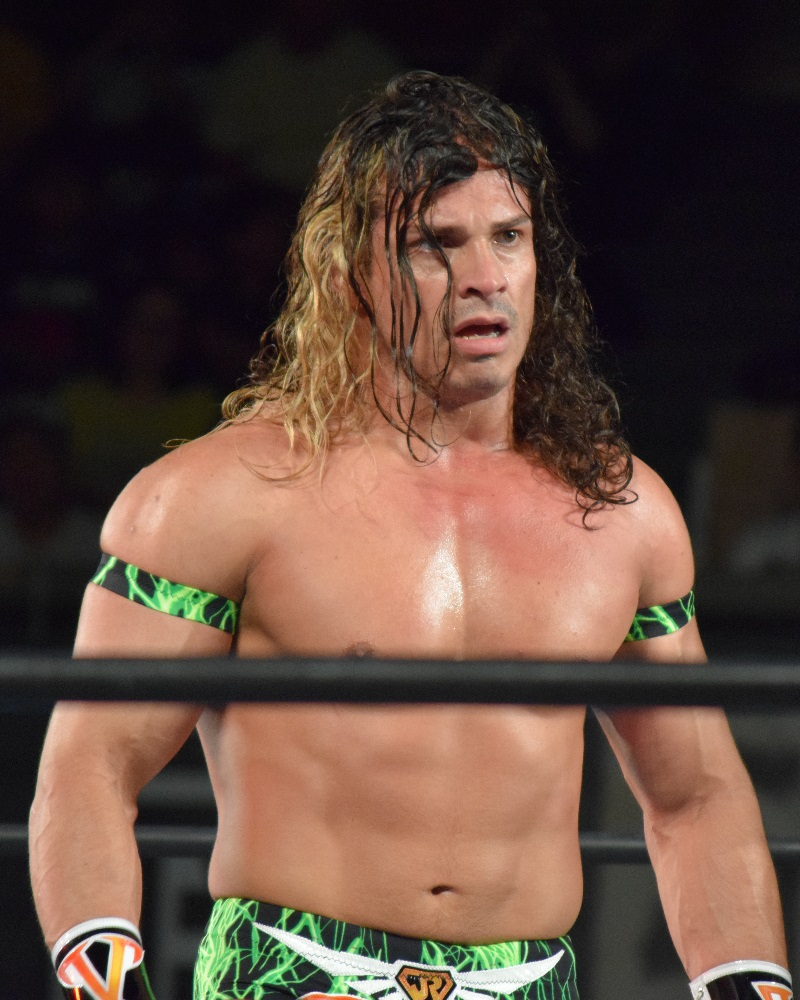
- Volador Jr. in May 2016

Personal information
- Born: Ramón Ibarra Rivera; January 26, 1981 (age 45) Monclova, Coahuila, Mexico
- Spouse: Bruni Sagnite (m. 2013)
- Children: 1

Professional wrestling career
- Ring name(s): Volador Jr. Volador; Komachi
- Billed height: 1.72 m (5 ft 8 in)
- Billed weight: 80 kg (180 lb)
- Billed from: Monclova, Coahuila, Mexico
- Trained by: Super Parka; El Satánico
- Debut: February 1996

Ramón Ibarra Rivera (born January 26, 1981), better known by his ring name Volador Jr., is a Mexican professional wrestler. He is signed to Consejo Mundial de Lucha Libre (CMLL), where he is the current NWA World Historic Middleweight Champion in his second reign and a member of The Don Callis Family. He portrays a rudo ("bad guy") wrestling character. He is the son of Super Parka, and his ring name refers to his father's previous gimmick, Volador. Ibarra is the cousin of the original La Parka, the cousin of El Hijo de L.A. Park and the uncle of Flyer; he is also related to a number of other luchadors in the Ibarra family.

Ibarra has also worked outside his native Mexico on multiple occasions, with his highest profile work being for Total Nonstop Action Wrestling (TNA) in the United States, and New Japan Pro-Wrestling (NJPW) in Japan. Volador Jr. originally worked under a mask, but was forced to unmask when he lost his mask to long-time friend turned rival, La Sombra, in September 2013.

Over the years, he has held a number of CMLL championships including the CMLL World Tag Team Championship, the CMLL World Trios Championship, the Mexican National Light Heavyweight Championship, Mexican National Trios Championship, the NWA World Historic Middleweight Championship and the NWA World Historic Welterweight Championship. He has won CMLL's Torneo Gran Alternativa, Leyenda de Plata and Torneo Nacional de Parejas Increibles tournaments.

== Professional wrestling career ==
=== Early career (1996–2000) ===
After training with his father and El Satánico, Volador Jr. made his professional wrestling debut in February 1996. He primarily worked for the Naucalpan-based International Wrestling Revolution Group (IWRG) until 2000.

=== Consejo Mundial de Lucha Libre (2000–present) ===
==== Early years (2000–2010) ====
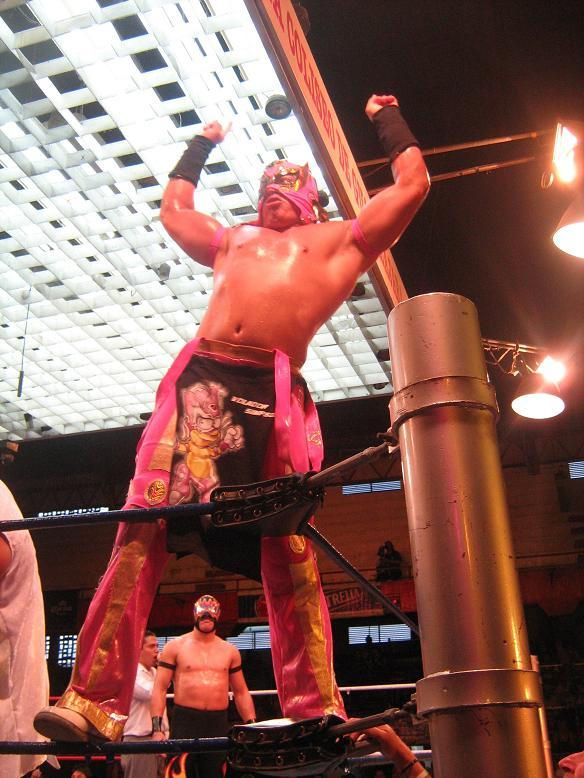
Volador Jr. in 2007

Volador Jr. began working for Consejo Mundial de Lucha Libre (CMLL) in 2000. He was paired with veteran Atlantis in the Torneo Gran Alternativa ("Great Alternative Tournament") on August 14, 2001, defeating Enemigo Publico and Máscara Año 2000 in the first round before losing to Black Warrior and Sangre Azteca in the semi-finals. On December 14, he, Tigre Blanco and Tony Rivera lost to Doctor X, El Hijo de Pierroth and Veneno in the opening match of the Sin Piedad ("No Mercy") pay-per-view. On September 12, 2003, Volador Jr. lost to Rocky Romero in a tournament final for the vacant CMLL World Lightweight Championship. Seven days later, at the CMLL 70th Anniversary Show, he, Ricky Marvin and Virus defeated Los Havana Brothers (Romero, Ricky Reyes and Pinoy Boy). On December 5, Volador Jr., El Felino and Safari defeated Alan Stone, Super Crazy and Zumbido for the vacant Mexican National Trios Championship, but lost it on March 25, 2005, to Pandilla Guerrera ("Gang of Warriors"; Azteca, Doctor X and Nitro). That same year, Volador Jr. won the inaugural Reyes del Aire ("Kings of the Air") tournament.

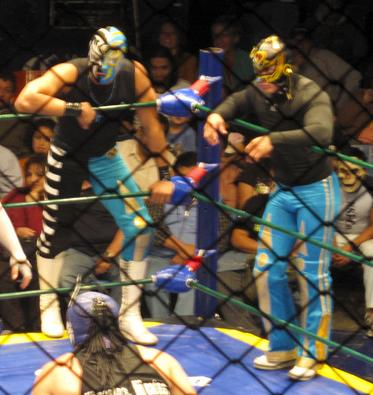
The team of La Sombra (left) and Volador Jr. (right) during a match

On August 13, 2007, Volador Jr., El Sagrado and La Sombra defeated Los Perros del Mal (Damián 666, Halloween and Mr. Águila) to win the title. At the CMLL 74th Anniversary Show on September 28, he, La Máscara and Último Dragón defeated Misterioso Jr., Texano Jr. and Virus. On January 16, 2009, Volador Jr. and La Sombra, dubbed "Super Sky Team", defeated Averno and Mephisto to win the CMLL World Tag Team Championship. However, he, El Sagrado and La Sombra lost the Mexican National Trios Championship to Poder Mexica ("Mexican Power"; Azteca, Black Warrior and Dragón Rojo Jr.) on February 3. At Sin Salida ("No Escape") on December 4, Super Sky Team successfully defended the title against Ephesto and Mephisto. CMLL fans voted them as the 2009 "CMLL Tag Team of the year", with Volador Jr. being voted "Most popular wrestler of the year" in the same poll.

==== Feuds with Místico and La Sombra (2010–2014) ====
Volador Jr., a técnico ("good guy"), was paired with rúdo ("bad guy") El Terrible for the Torneo Nacional de Parejas Increíbles ("National Incredible Pairs Tournament") on January 22, 2010. During the quarter-finals against Averno and Místico, Místico seemingly developed a rúdo attitude, attacking Volador Jr. and going so far as to ripping up his mask, performing an illegal low blow on him for the win. Afterwards, Místico took the microphone and commented that "all was fair in war and defending Mexico City", drawing many boos from the crowd. During a match between the two on February 5, Místico was clearly a rúdo, tearing so viciously at Volador's mask that a new one had to be brought to the ring between falls. In the second fall, he pulled his mask off and threw it to Volador Jr. in an attempt to get him disqualified. Volador Jr. won the match when he reversed Místico's La Mística and applied the same move to him. On February 12, Volador Jr. defeated Místico to win the Mexican National Light Heavyweight Championship. He, Felino, La Sombra and Místico fought in a four-way Lucha de Apuestas ("bet match") in the main event of Homenaje a Dos Leyendas on March 19; he was not one of the first two pinned, keeping his mask safe. In April, Volador Jr. and Delta competed in the Torneo Gran Alternativa, defeating Felino and Tiger Kid in the first round, Averno and Raziel in the quarter-finals and Puma King and Último Guerrero in the semi-finals, before losing to Héctor Garza and Pólvora in the finals.

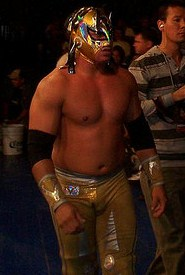
Volador Jr. in December 2010

Místico then announced that he was done being a rúdo and returned to the técnico side, although Volador Jr. remained suspicious. At Sin Salida on June 6, Místico, Máscara Dorada and Mr. Águila defeated Averno, Negro Casas and Volador Jr., who worked a rúdo style and was caught cheating by the referee. On July 12, at the Promociones Gutiérrez 1st Anniversary Show, Volador Jr. participated in a match where ten men from five pareja increibles teams put their mask on the line, with the losing team being forced to wrestle each other for their masks. His partner in the match was El Alebrije, facing off against the teams of Atlantis and Olímpico, Místico and El Oriental, Histeria and La Sombra and Averno and Guerrero. Volador Jr. and El Alebrije were the second team to escape the match. Volador Jr. and La Sombra lost the CMLL World Tag Team Championship to Los Invasores ("The Invaders"; Mr. Águila and Garza) on July 16. On August 6, during the Universal Championship tournament, Volador Jr. defeated Valiente in the first round. In the second round, Volador Jr. cemented his status as a rúdo when he was disqualified for excessive violence against La Máscara. He kept attacking La Máscara after the match ended, leaving him an easy victim for his next round opponent, Jushin Thunder Liger. Three days later, Volador Jr. attacked La Sombra and ripped off his mask after a six-man tag team match with the two on opposite sides, ending their partnership. The feud between the two led both wrestlers to be booked in the Lucha de Apuestas main event of the CMLL 77th Anniversary Show on September 3, a 14-man steel cage match, where Volador Jr. was the tenth man to leave the cage. On October 5, Volador Jr. lost the Mexican National Light Heavyweight Championship to La Máscara, ending his reign at 236 days.

Volador Jr. was paired with Diamante for the Torneo Nacional de Parejas Increíbles on February 18, 2011, defeating Ephesto and Stuka Jr. in the first round and La Sombra and Misterioso Jr. in the quarter-finals, before losing in the semi-finals to Atlantis and Dorada. He took over the Los Invasores stable in July after Garza, the leader, turned técnico. On September 20, Volador Jr. and stablemates Olímpico and Psicosis II defeated Ángel de Oro, Diamante and Rush for the Mexican National Trios Championship. On October 7, he defeated Liger to win the Leyenda de Plata ("The Silver Legend") tournament. At Sin Piedad on December 16, Los Invasores lost the title to Atlantis, Delta and Guerrero Maya Jr. On February 14, 2012, Volador Jr. defeated La Máscara to win the NWA World Historic Middleweight Championship for the first time. Three days later, he and Dorada participated in that year's Torneo Nacional de Parejas Increíbles, defeating Euforia and Guerrero Maya Jr. in the first round before losing to La Sombra and Mr. Águila in the quarter-finals. On March 30, Volador Jr. lost his title to Prince Devitt. On June 20, Volador Jr. formed the Los Depredadores del Aire ("The Predators of the Air") group alongside Black Warrior and Mr. Águila. Two days later, they defeated Los Reyes de la Atlantida ("The Kings of the Atlantis; Atlantis, Delta and Guerrero Maya Jr.) to win the Mexican National Trios Championship. In August, Volador Jr. started a rivalry with Mr. Niebla, for which he was positioned as a técnico despite being a part of Los Invasores. During that year's Leyenda de Azul ("The Blue Legend") tournament on October 12, Volador Jr. was disqualified for unmasking Azul. On October 30, Los Depredadores del Aire lost the title in a rematch.

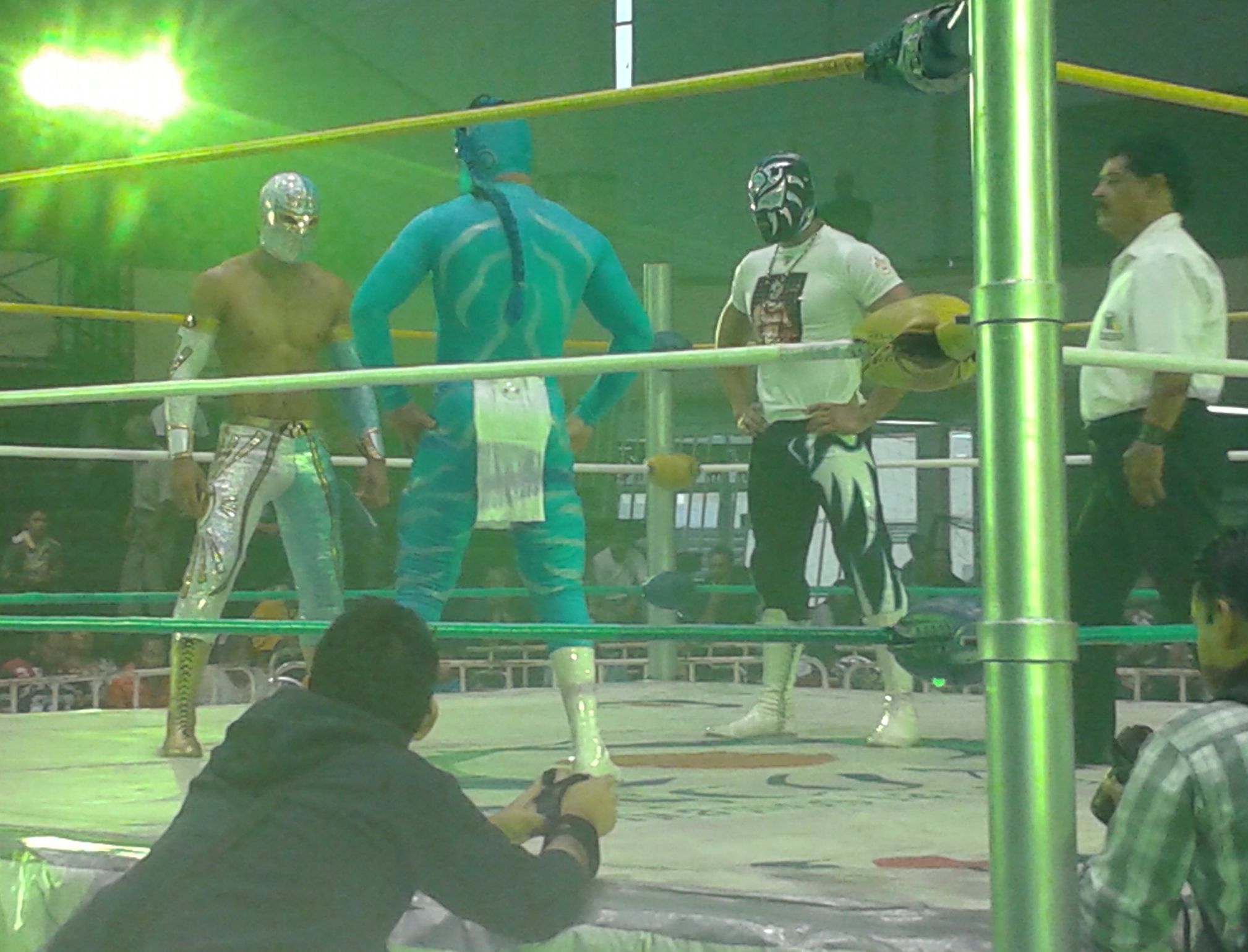
Volador Jr. (center) in the ring with Místico II (left) and La Sombra (right) in May 2013

On January 22, 2013, Volador Jr. and Rey Escorpión survived a torneo cibernetico to face each other for the vacant CMLL World Light Heavyweight Championship, which Escorpión won the following week. He was also defeated by La Sombra in the finals of the Reyes del Aire on February 15. As such, the following month, they were paired for the Torneo Nacional de Parejas Increibles, the same tournament that, in 2010, was the impetus for Volador Jr.'s rúdo turn. The rivals put their issues aside, defeating the teams of Guerrero Maya Jr. and Negro Casas, Averno and La Máscara and Mr. Niebla and Shocker to qualify for the finals, where they defeated Atlantis and Guerrero on March 15 at Homenaje a Dos Leyendas. Their brief truce ended two days later, when La Sombra teamed with Marco Corleone and Místico II against Volador Jr., Euforia and Último Guerrero. During the match, Volador Jr. attacked both La Sombra and the referee, causing a disqualification before leaving the ring and his confused partners behind. On June 28, he seemingly defeated La Sombra for the IWGP Intercontinental Championship after unmasking him. However, the decision was overturned when the referee noticed Volador Jr. holding La Sombra's mask, disqualifying him in the process. On September 13, at the CMLL 80th Anniversary Show, Volador Jr. and La Sombra defeated Atlantis and Guerrero in a Relevos Suicidas match, thus advancing to a mask vs. mask Lucha de Apuestas against each other. In the end, Volador Jr. was defeated and forced to unmask and reveal his real name, Ramón Ibarra Rivera.

On November 19, Volador Jr. defeated Dorada to win the NWA World Historic Welterweight Championship. Three days later, Volador Jr. began showing signs of a técnico turn by shaking hands with Místico and trying to save him from Los Guerreros Laguneros ("The Warriors of the Lagoon"; Euforia and Guerrero). His turn was finalized on November 29, when Los Invasores attacked him following a torneo cibernetico between Los Invasores and CMLL representatives. On January 31, 2014, he and Soberano Jr. entered the Torneo Gran Alternativa, defeating Espanto Jr. and Mephisto in the first round, El Terrible and Guerrero Negro Jr. in the quarter-finals and La Sombra and Oro Jr. in the semi-finals, before losing to Bárbaro Cavernario and Mr. Niebla in the finals on February 14. On June 6, due to outside interference from La Máscara and Rush, Volador Jr. lost the NWA World Historic Welterweight Championship to now-rúdo La Sombra in a match also contested for the NWA World Historic Middleweight Championship, but regained it on August 1 at El Juicio Final ("Final Judgment"). At the CMLL 81st Anniversary Show on September 19, he, Dorada and Valiente defeated Euforia, Mr. Niebla and Thunder by disqualification. On October 6, Volador Jr. successfully defended his title against La Sombra.

==== Sky Team (2015–2021) ====
In early 2015, Volador Jr., Místico and Valiente formed a new Sky Team, defeating Los Guerreros Laguneros (Euforia, Guerrero and Niebla Roja) on February 13 to win the CMLL World Trios Championship. Shortly after, Volador Jr. and Rey Bucanero were paired for that year's Torneo Nacional de Parejas Increíbles, defeating Cavernario and Titán in the first round, Casas and La Sombra in the quarter-finals and La Máscara and Mephisto in the semi-finals, before losing to El Terrible (Bucanero's partner at the time) and Máximo in the finals on March 6. Their feud led to a hair vs. hair Lucha de Apuestas at Homenaje a Dos Leyendas on March 20, where Volador Jr. and Máximo defeated Bucanero and El Terrible, forcing them both to have their hair shaved off after the match. On September 18, Volador Jr., Guerrero and Shocker defeated Corleone, Rush and Thunder by disqualification at the CMLL 82nd Anniversary Show. He also defeated Casas to get his hair shaved off at Homenaje a Dos Leyendas on March 18, 2016. The following month, Volador Jr. and Esfinge defeated Escorpión and Fujin to win the Torneo Gran Alternativa. On July 1, Volador Jr. won his first International Gran Prix, lastly eliminating Tama Tonga. Sky Team successfully defended their championship against Los Guerreros Laguneros at the CMLL 83rd Anniversary Show on September 6. On October 28, Volador Jr. lost to Sky Team partner Valiente in the finals of the Universal Championship tournament.

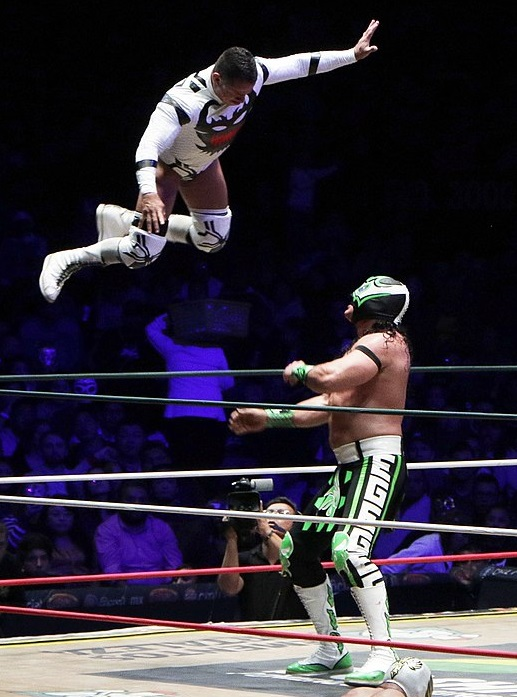
Volador Jr. diving onto Euforia in a match on November 30, 2018

On February 10, 2017, for that year's Torneo Nacional de Parejas Increíbles, he and Cavernario defeated the teams of Puma and Rey Cometa, Máscara Año 2000 and Máximo and Carístico and Mephisto to advance to the finals, ultimately defeating Guerrero and Valiente on February 24. On March 17, at Homenaje a Dos Leyendas, Sky Team successfully defended the trios championship against Hechicero and Los Hijos del Infierno ("The Sons of Hell"; Luciferno and Mephisto). Volador Jr. and his nephew, Flyer, were defeated by Carístico and Soberano Jr. in the quarter-finals of the Torneo Gran Alternativa on June 9. On July 14, he defeated Guerrero in the finals of that year's Universal Championship tournament. At the CMLL 84th Anniversary Show on September 16, he teamed with Carístico and Flip Gordon to defeat Guerrero, Mephisto and Satoshi Kojima. He defeated Carístico on October 20 to win the Leyenda de Plata. On November 3, Volador Jr. turned on Carístico, attacking him with help from Rush, who stated that Volador Jr. had everything it took to join Los Ingobernables ("The Ungovernables"). Despite this, Volador Jr. never joined the group, insisting that he would remain a técnico and continue his feud with Carístico due to a lack of empathy towards his new character. He retained the NWA World Historic Welterweight Championship against Carístico on December 29.

For the 2018 Torneo Nacional de Parejas Increíbles, Volador Jr. and Guerrero defeated Cavernario and Titán, Diamante Azul and Pierroth and Mephisto and Místico en route to the finals, where they lost to El Terrible and Rush. Following this, Volador Jr. and Valiente won a tournament for the CMLL World Tag Team Championship, defeating Euforia and Kraneo in the first round, Dragon Lee and Místico in the quarter-finals, Gran Guerrero and Último Guerrero in the semi-finals and Bucanero and El Terrible in the finals on March 16 at Homenaje a Dos Leyendas. On March 30, Volador Jr. lost the NWA World Historic Welterweight Championship to Matt Taven. In May, he and Flyer defeated Templario and Último Guerrero to win the Torneo Gran Alternativa. Sky Team lost the CMLL World Trios Championship to Los Guerreros Laguneros on July 1, followed by he and Valiente losing the tag team championship to El Terrible and Rush on July 13. On August 3, he defeated Taven to regain the NWA World Historic Welterweight Championship at the Negro Casas 40th Anniversary Show. They subsequently joined forces after being attacked by the two. The storyline culminated in the main event of the CMLL 85th Anniversary Show on September 14, where Rush and Cavernario (who replaced El Terrible due to injury) defeated Volador Jr. and Taven in a Lucha de Apuestas after Taven turned on Volador Jr., causing them both to have their hair shaved off. During the International Grand Prix on August 8, Volador Jr. eliminated Taven before being eliminated by Gilbert el Boricua.

Volador Jr., Carístico and Místico unsuccessfully challenged Los Guerreros Laguneros for the CMLL World Trios Championship at Leyendas Mexicanas ("Mexican Legends") on November 30. He, Carístico and Lee failed to win the same title on March 15, 2019, at Homenaje a Dos Leyendas. Volador Jr. and Guerrero were paired for the Torneo Nacional de Parejas Increíbles for the second year in a row in April, however, Guerrero betrayed him in the finals against Cavernario and Titán. On August 31, Volador Jr. won his second International Grand Prix, lastly eliminating Casas. By this time, he was involved in a multi-man storyline including Big Daddy, Casas, Cavernario, Ciber the Main Man, Guerrero and Gilbert el Boricua, all of whom fought in a steel cage match at the CMLL 86th Anniversary Show on September 27, where Volador Jr. was the fourth to escape the cage. At the CMLL 87th Anniversary Show on September 25, 2020, Volador Jr. successfully defended his NWA World Historic Welterweight Championship against Templario. The following year, he and Templario defeated Carístico and Virus to win the Torneo Nacional de Parejas Increíbles.

==== Los Depradores (2021–2026) ====
In September 2021, Volador Jr. introduced his new stable of young wrestlers called Los Depradores ("The Predators"), consisting of Diamond, Magnus, Magia Blanca, Rugido and an unknown fifth wrestler. At the CMLL 88th Anniversary Show on September 24, Volador Jr. and Titán defeated Los Gemelos Diablo ("The Devil Twins") to win the CMLL World Tag Team Championship, but lost it to Ángel de Oro and Niebla Roja on January 23, 2022. Months later, the unknown wrestler was revealed as Mercurio, and Volador Jr. recruited Dark Silueta as the first female member of the stable. On August 8, Volador Jr. won his third International Grand Prix, last eliminating Tiger Mask. At the CMLL 89th Anniversary Show on September 16, he lost to Ángel de Oro in the three-way finals of the Copa Independencia ("Independence Cup") tournament, which also involved Místico. On December 16, Volador Jr. teamed with Panterita del Ring Jr. for the Torneo Gran Alternativa, defeating Arkalis and Atlantis in the first round and Suicida and Titán in the semi-finals. However, Volador Jr. pulled out of the tournament before the finals after testing positive for COVID-19; he was replaced by Místico.

Volador Jr. celebrating a fall with KeMonito, Stuka Jr. and Titán in June 2022

On January 20, 2023, Volador Jr. lost the NWA World Historic Welterweight Championship to Rocky Romero. They were forced to team together for the Torneo Nacional de Parejas Increibles, defeating Ángel de Oro and Oraculo in the first round before losing to Averno and Místico in the semi-finals. At Homenaje a Dos Leyendas on March 17, Volador Jr. pinned Romero in a four-way hair vs. hair match, forcing him to have all of his hair shaved off. On June 2, Volador Jr., Atlantis Jr. and Star Jr. defeated Los Infernales ("The Infernals"; Euforia, Hechicero and Mephisto) to win the CMLL World Trios Championship. At Fantastica Mania Mexico on June 30, he failed to regain the NWA World Historic Welterweight Championship from Romero. At the CMLL 90th Anniversary Show on September 16, he defeated Ángel de Oro in a Lucha de Apuestas, which saw the latter's hair shaved off in the process. On February 5, 2024, Volador Jr., Atlantis Jr. and Star Jr. lost the trios championship to Los Bárbaros ("The Barbarians"; Cavernario, Dragón Rojo Jr. and El Terrible). At Homenaje a Dos Leyendas on March 29, he, Blue Panther, Místico and Último Guerrero defeated Bryan Danielson, Claudio Castagnoli, Jon Moxley and Matt Sydal. On September 13, at the CMLL 91st Anniversary Show, he, Atlantis Jr. and Guerrero defeated Orange Cassidy, Romero and Satoshi Kojima. At Noche de Campeones ("Night of Champions") on September 27, he unsuccessfully challenged Templario for the CMLL World Middleweight Championship.

In December 2024, Volador Jr. began working as a rúdo for the first time in ten years. On March 5, 2025, he kicked Blanca out of Los Depradores. At Homenaje a Dos Leyendas on March 21, he and former rival Romero unsuccessfully challenged Ángel de Oro and Roja for the CMLL World Tag Team Championship. On July 22, he failed to win the NWA World Historic Middleweight Championship from Flip Gordon. At the CMLL 92nd Anniversary Show on September 19, Volador Jr., Hechicero and Zandokan Jr. lost to Atlantis Jr., Máscara Dorada and Neón.

==== Don Callis Family (2026–present) ====
On March 30, 2026, Volador Jr. joined the Don Callis Family. The next day, he again failed to win Gordon's title. He and new stablemates El Clon and Hechicero unsuccessfully challenged JetSpeed (Kevin Knight and "Speedball" Mike Bailey) and Místico for the AEW World Trios Championship on April 3. On May 22, he failed to win the ROH World Championship from Bandido. On July 3, Volador Jr. defeated Gordon to win his second NWA World Historic Middleweight Championship.

=== Total Nonstop Action Wrestling (2008) ===
In 2008, Volador Jr. traveled to the United States to compete for the Florida-based Total Nonstop Action Wrestling (TNA) as part of their World X Cup tournament, representing Team Mexico alongside Averno, Rey Bucanero and Último Guerrero. TNA dropped the "Junior" part of his name and promoted him as "Volador". He made his debut in an Ultimate X match at the Victory Road pay-per-view on July 13, defeating Daivari, Kaz and Naruki Doi to score four points for his team, allowing Team Mexico to win the tournament by one point. On the October 30 episode of Impact!, Volador returned to TNA, teaming with Hiroshi Tanahashi in a loss to Motor City Machine Guns (Alex Shelley and Chris Sabin). On the November 6 episode, Volador and Tanahashi took part in a ladder match involving Abyss and Matt Morgan, Team 3D (Brother Devon and Brother Ray) and Latin American Xchange (Hernandez and Homicide) to determine the number one contenders for the TNA World Tag Team Championship, which Abyss and Morgan won. Three days later, at Turning Point, Volador participated in a ten-man X Division elimination rankings match, but was the second man eliminated by Jimmy Rave.

=== New Japan Pro-Wrestling (2012–present) ===
On January 21 and 22, 2012, Volador Jr. took part in the CMLL and New Japan Pro-Wrestling (NJPW) co-produced Fantastica Mania 2012 events in Tokyo. On the first night, he teamed with Kazuchika Okada to defeat Hiroshi Tanahashi and La Sombra. In the main event of the second night, Volador Jr. unsuccessfully challenged La Sombra for the NWA World Historic Welterweight Championship. He returned on July 29 at the NJPW 40th Anniversary Show, unsuccessfully challenging Prince Devitt for the NWA World Historic Middleweight Championship in the main event. During the third and final night of Fantastica Mania 2013 in January 2013, he unsuccessfully challenged La Máscara for the Mexican National Light Heavyweight Championship. On January 17, 2014, the third event of the five-night Fantastica Mania 2014 tour was headlined by the first interaction between Volador Jr. and long-time rival La Sombra after the former's técnico turn. The match, wrestled under Match Relampago VIP rules, ended in a ten-minute time limit draw. Two days later, in the final match of the tour, Volador Jr. successfully defended the NWA World Historic Welterweight Championship against Máscara Dorada.

In January 2015, Volador Jr. took part in the Fantastica Mania 2015 tour, where he and Stigma lost to Gran Guerrero and Último Guerrero in the first round of a tag team tournament. He also successfully defended the NWA World Historic Welterweight Championship against Gran Guerrero. In January 2016, Volador Jr. took part in the Fantastica Mania 2016 tour, successfully defending the championship against Mephisto in the main event of its final show. Volador Jr. was invited back to Japan in May to participate in NJPW's annual Best of the Super Juniors tournament. After four wins and two losses, Volador Jr. headed to his final round-robin match leading his block, but was eliminated after losing to Will Ospreay. A year later, after wrestling on the Fantastica Mania 2017 tour, Volador Jr. was announced as a returning participant in that year's Best of the Super Juniors. He finished the tournament with a record of three wins and four losses, failing to advance to the finals. He also wrestled on both days of the G1 Special in USA tour on July 1 and 2, where he lost to, and then defeated, members of Los Ingobernables de Japón ("The Ungovernables of Japan"; L.I.J.) with various partners.

During the Fantastica Mania 2018 tour in January 2018, Volador Jr. successfully defended his NWA World Historic Welterweight Championship against Bárbaro Cavernario. On October 9, it was announced that Volador Jr. would be teaming with Soberano Jr. in NJPW's annual Super Junior Tag League. They defeated the teams of ACH and Ryusuke Taguchi and Taiji Ishimori and Robbie Eagles, but lost their five remaining matches, failing to advance to the finals. At Power Struggle on November 3, he, Jushin Thunder Liger, Soberano Jr. and Tiger Mask lost to ACH, Chris Sabin, Taguchi and Toa Henare. In January 2019, Volador Jr. and Flyer participated in a family tag team tournament during Fantastica Mania 2019, losing in the first round to Dragon Lee and Místico. Nine months later, Volador Jr. and Titán teamed up for that year's Super Junior Tag League, but failed to advance to the finals with a record of four wins and three losses. On November 3, he, Clark Connors, Titán and TJP defeated Liger, Taguchi, Tiger Mask and Yuya Uemura at Power Struggle.

Volador Jr. returned to NJPW at Battle in the Valley on February 18, 2023, teaming with Kevin Knight, KUSHIDA and The DKC to defeat Adrian Quest, Josh Alexander, Máscara Dorada and Rocky Romero. Shortly after, during the revived Fantastica Mania 2023 tour, Volador Jr. and Los Depredadores stablemate Magia Blanca participated in a faction tag team tournament, losing to Los Guerreros Increíbles de la Atlántida ("The Incredible Warriors of Atlantis"; Atlantis Jr. and Último Guerrero) in the first round, but defeating Los Dulces Atrapasueños ("The Sweet Dreamcatchers"; Dulce Gardenia and Rey Cometa) in the third place match. At Battle in the Valley on January 13, 2024, he and Dorada defeated Romero and Soberano Jr. Volador Jr. and Magnus competed in the same tournament during the Fantastica Mania 2024 tour, defeating La Fuerza Poblana ("The Puebla Force"; Pegasso and Stigma) in the first round before losing to Stuka Jr. and Último Guerrero in the finals.

=== Ring of Honor (2017–2019, 2025) ===
Due to CMLL's partnership with Ring of Honor (ROH), Volador Jr. appeared at Supercard of Honor XI on April 1, 2017, where he teamed with Will Ospreay to defeat Dragon Lee and Jay White. He returned at Manhattan Mayhem on March 3, 2018, where he and Dalton Castle defeated Jay Lethal and Último Guerrero. From September 6 to 8, 2019, Volador Jr. competed in all three nights of the Global Wars Espectacular tour, unsuccessfully challenging Matt Taven for the ROH World Championship during the second. He returned on the February 27, 2025 episode of Ring of Honor Wrestling, where he, Magnus and Soberano Jr. lost to Atlantis Jr., Máscara Dorada and Templario.

=== Major League Wrestling (2025) ===
Volador Jr. made his debut for Major League Wrestling (MLW) at Fightland on September 13, 2025, defeating Titán in the first round of the Opera Cup tournament during a taping for Fury Road. After defeating Star Jr. in the quarter-finals and Satoshi Kojima in the semi-finals, he lost to Místico in the finals on November 20 at MLW x Don Gato Tequila: Lucha de los Muertos.

=== All Elite Wrestling (2024–present) ===
In January 2024, it was announced the CMLL stars, Volador Jr., Máscara Dorada, Hechicero and Místico would represent their home promotion, in American partner promotion All Elite Wrestling (AEW). The four men made their debut on the January 31 edition of AEW Dynamite, appearing ringside during Jon Moxley's singles match against Jeff Hardy. After being taunted by Moxley during the match, the four men attacked him after his victory, before being chased off by members of the AEW roster. The four men made their AEW in-ring debut during the February 2 edition of AEW Rampage, defeating Christopher Daniels, Matt Sydal, Angelo Parker and Matt Menard, in an 8-man tag-team match. On June 18, 2025 at Grand Slam Mexico, Volador Jr. teamed with members of the Don Callis Family in a 14-man tag team match, but were defeated. On March 30, 2026, Volador Jr. joined the Don Callis Family.

== Personal life ==
Ibarra is a part of an extended family of wrestlers, including his father Ramón Ibarra Banda, who wrestled as Super Parka and previously as Volador; this is the inspiration for Volador Jr., Ibarra's ring name. His uncles wrestle as Johnny Ibarra and El Desalmado, and he is the cousin of lucha libre legend L.A. Park and wrestler El Hijo de Cien Caras. He is also the great cousin of L.A. Park's son, who wrestles as El Hijo de L.A. Park. Ibarra's nephew, a grandson of Ramón Ibarra Banda, began working for CMLL in 2014 under the ring name Flyer.

In 2013, Ibarra married CMLL Edecanes ("ring girl") Bruni Sagnite. The couple have a son together, born in 2014.

== Championships and accomplishments ==
- Consejo Mundial de Lucha Libre
  - CMLL World Tag Team Championship (3 times) – with La Sombra (1), Valiente (1) and Titán (1)
  - CMLL World Trios Championship (2 times) – with Místico and Valiente (1) and Atlantis Jr. and Star Jr. (1)
  - Mexican National Light Heavyweight Championship (1 time)
  - Mexican National Trios Championship (4 times) – with Safari and El Felino (1), La Sombra and El Sagrado (1), Olímpico and Psicosis II (1), and Black Warrior and Mr. Águila (1)
  - NWA World Historic Middleweight Championship (2 times, current)
  - NWA World Historic Welterweight Championship (3 times)
  - Copa Homenaje A Dos Leyendas
  - Copa 53 Aniversario de la Arena Coliseo de Guadalajara (2012)
  - Copa Bicentenario
  - Copa Bobby Bonales
  - International Gran Prix (2016, 2019, 2022)
  - Torneo Gran Alternativa: 2016 – with Esfinge
  - Torneo Gran Alternativa: 2018 – with Flyer
  - Leyenda de Plata (2011, 2017)
  - Reyes del Aire (2005, 2007, 2009)
  - Torneo Nacional de Parejas Increibles (2013, 2017, 2021) – with La Sombra, Bárbaro Cavernario, Templario
  - Torneo Increibles de Parejas, Arena Puebla – with Atlantis
  - CMLL Universal Championship (2017)
  - CMLL Most Popular Wrestler of the Year (2009)
  - CMLL Tag Team of the Year (2009) – with La Sombra
- Lucha Libre Azteca
  - Azteca Championship (1 time)
- Promociones El Cholo
  - Promociones El Cholo Cruiserweight Championship (1 time, current)
- Pro Wrestling Illustrated
  - Ranked No. 81 of the top 500 singles wrestlers in the PWI 500 in 2010
- Total Nonstop Action Wrestling
  - TNA World X Cup (2008) – with Rey Bucanero, Último Guerrero and Averno
- Union Independent Pro Wrestling
  - UIPW Heavyweight Championship (1 time)

== Luchas de Apuestas record ==
Winner (wager)	Loser (wager)	Location	Event	Date	Notes
Volador Jr. (mask)	Cowboy (mask)	Naucalpan, State of Mexico	Live event	1998	
Volador Jr. (mask)	Diablo (mask)	N/A	Live event	2001	
Volador Jr. (mask)	El Demolodor (mask)	Cuernavaca, Morelos	Live event	April 18, 2002	
Volador Jr. (mask)	Tony Tijuana (mask)	Nezahualcoyotl, State of Mexico	Live event	April 28, 2002	(Note: Relevos suicida match: Lost to Arkange and Mano Negra Jr.)
Volador Jr. and Místico (masks)	Anthrax and Ebola (hair)	Guadalajara, Jalisco	Live event	October 7, 2004	
Volador Jr. (mask)	Misterioso (hair)	Reynosa, Tamaulipas	Live event	November 30, 2008	(Note: Volador Jr. teamed with Volador and Misterioso teamed with Misterioso, Jr., Volador Jr. pinned Misterioso to force him to be shaved bald.)
La Sombra (mask)	Volador Jr. (mask)	Mexico City	CMLL 80th Anniversary Show	September 13, 2013	(Note: The team lost a Relevos suicida match to Atlantis and Último Guerrero.)
Máximo and Volador Jr. (hair)	TRT: La Máquina de la Destrucción (hair) (El Terrible and Rey Bucanero)	Mexico City	Homenaje a Dos Leyendas	March 20, 2015	
Volador Jr. (hair)	Negro Casas (hair)	Mexico City	Homenaje a Dos Leyendas	March 18, 2016	
Bárbaro Cavernario and Rush (hair)	Matt Taven and Volador Jr. (hair)	Mexico City	CMLL 85th Anniversary Show	September 14, 2018	
Volador Jr. (hair)	Rocky Romero (hair)	Mexico City	Homenaje a Dos Leyendas	March 17, 2023	
Volador Jr. (hair)	Ángel de Oro (hair)	Mexico City	CMLL 90th Anniversary Show	September 16, 2023	
