= CMLL Torneo Nacional de Parejas Increíbles (2015) =

2015 Consejo Mundial de Lucha Libre tournament

- Official poster for the finals of the tournament
- Promotion: Consejo Mundial de Lucha Libre (CMLL)
- Date: February 20, 2015; February 27, 2015; March 6, 2015
- City: Mexico City, Mexico
- Venue: Arena México

Event chronology
← Previous; Fantastica Mania	Next → Homenaje a Dos Leyendas

CMLL Torneo Nacional de Parejas Increibles tournaments chronology
← Previous; 2014	Next → 2016

The CMLL Torneo Nacional de Parejas Increíbles 2015 or "National Incredible Pairs Tournament 2015" was a Lucha Libre or professional wrestling, tournaments for Tag Teams held by the Mexican wrestling promotion Consejo Mundial de Lucha Libre (CMLL). The tournament was based on the Lucha Libre Parejas Increíbles match concept where two wrestlers of opposite allegiance, portraying either villains, referred to as "Rudos" in Lucha Libre wrestling terminology or fan favorites, or "tecnicos". At times some of the team members were part of a pre-existing scripted feuds or storylines with each other. The tournament was won by rivals Máximo and El Terrible, who at the time of the tournament had already signed a contract to face off in a Luchas de Apuestas at the upcoming 2015 Homenaje a Dos Leyendas. The 2015 version of the tournament was the sixth overall time CMLL has held such a tournament, starting in 2010 and always held early in the year.

== Tournament ==
Consejo Mundial de Lucha Libre (CMLL) started their sixth annual Torneo Nacional De Parejas Increíbles tournament on February 20 and it will continue on the two subsequent shows of CMLL's Friday night CMLL Super Viernes shows. Being a professional wrestling tournament, it is not won legitimately to combat; it is instead won via a scripted ending to wrestling matches, often incorporating storylines between two or more of the competitors.

Místico was originally announced as part of the tournament, teaming with Ripper in the first block, but on the night of the tournament he was replaced by Guerrero Maya Jr. with no official explanation. Most of the teams in the tournament were actively engaged in storyline feuds at the time the tournament was announced. The team of Dragon Lee and Kamaitachi had already signed a contract for a Luchas de Apuestas, mask vs. mask match at the upcoming 2015 Homenaje a Dos Leyendas show; while Block A winners Volador Jr. and Rey Bucanero are slated to be on opposite sides of the tag team main event match of Dos Leyendas. The tournament is supposed to mark the return of Rush who suffered a broken leg in 2014. He was originally announced as making his return for the tournament on February 20, but when the card was announced Rush was not included in Group A of the tournament but later booked in Bock B instead. The finals of the tournament will be Volador Jr. and Rey Bucanero facing off against the team of Máximo and El Terrible pitting the four men in the main event of the 2015 Homenaje a Dos Leyendas show. In the end the team of Máximo and El Terrible defeated Volador Jr. and Rey Bucanero to win the entire tournament.

=== Tournament Participants ===
Key

Symbol	Meaning
(T)	This wrestler is a Tecnico
(R)	This wrestler is a Rudo

Block A

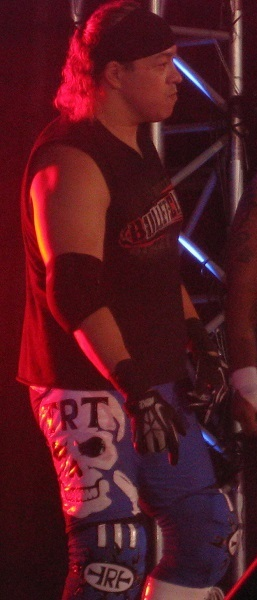
Half of the Block A winning team Rey Bucanero

- Delta (T) and Misterioso Jr. (R)
- Dragon Lee (T) and Kamaitachi (R)
- La Máscara (T) and Mephisto (R)
- Guerrero Maya Jr. (T) and Ripper (R)
- Titán (T) and Bárbaro Cavernario (R)
- Valiente (T) and Euforia (R)
- Volador Jr. (T) and Rey Bucanero (R)
- La Sombra (T) and Negro Casas (R)

Block B

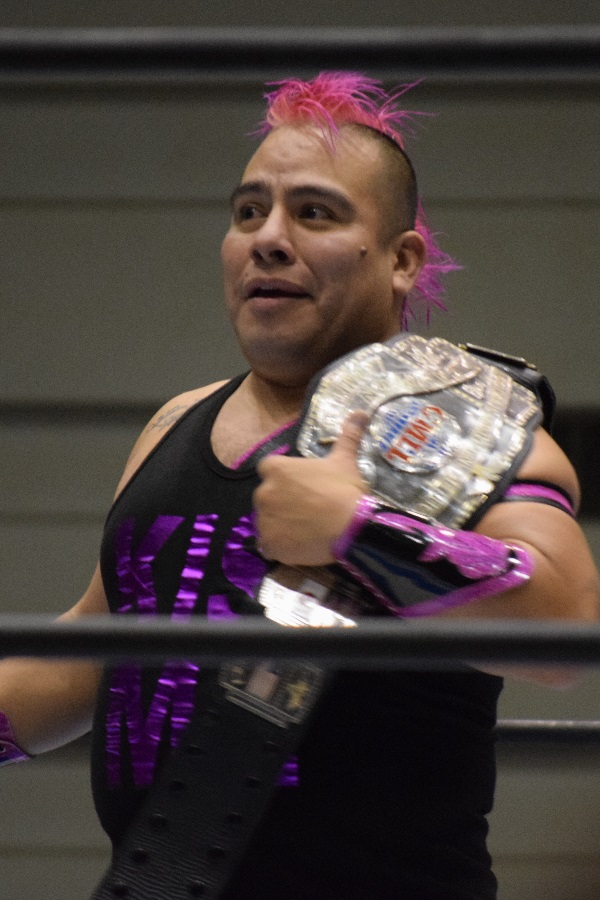
Half of the Block B winning team Máximo.

- Ángel de Oro (T) and Hechicero (R)
- Atlantis (T) and Último Guerrero (R)
- Blue Panther (T) and El Felino (R)
- Marco Corleone (T) and Thunder (R)
- Dragón Rojo Jr. (T) and Niebla Roja (R)
- Máximo (T) and El Terrible (R)
- Rush (T) and Shocker (R)
- Stuka Jr. (T) and Gran Guerrero (R)

=== Tournament results ===
First round
La Máscara and Mephisto	W
Dragon Lee and Kamaitachi
Delta and Misterioso Jr. (R)
Guerrero Maya Jr. and Ripper	W
Titán and Bárbaro Cavernario
Volador Jr. and Rey Bucanero	W
Valiente and Euforia
La Sombra and Negro Casas	W
Stuka Jr. and Gran Guerrero	W
Blue Panther and El Felino
Máximo and El Terrible	W
Dragón Rojo Jr. and Niebla Roja
Rush and Shocker	W
Marco Corleone and Thunder
Atlantis and Último Guerrero	W
Ángel de Oro and Hechicero

Second round
La Máscara and Mephisto	W
Guerrero Maya Jr. and Ripper
Volador Jr. and Rey Bucanero	W
La Sombra and Negro Casas
Stuka Jr. and Gran Guerrero
Máximo and El Terrible	W
Rush and Shocker
Atlantis and Último Guerrero	W

Semifinals
La Máscara and Mephisto
Volador Jr. and Rey Bucanero	W
Máximo and El Terrible	W
Atlantis and Último Guerrero

Finals
Volador Jr. and Rey Bucanero
Máximo and El Terrible	W
