= Thunder (luchador) =

Australian professional wrestler (1981 – 2016)

Personal information
- Born: Luke Fordward; October 7, 1981 Malabar, New South Wales, Australia
- Died: 30 June 2016 (aged 34)
- Cause of death: Stomach cancer

Professional wrestling career
- Ring name(s): Taipan; Thunder; Thunderbird
- Billed height: 1.95 m (6 ft 5 in)
- Billed weight: 133 kg (293 lb)
- Trained by: Tony Salazar; Franco Colombo; El Satánico; Demus 3:16
- Debut: 2007

Luke Fordward (October 7, 1981 – June 30, 2016) better known by his ring name Thunder, was an Australian masked professional wrestler (referred to as a luchador enmascarado in Mexico) best known for his work in the Mexican professional wrestling promotion Consejo Mundial de Lucha Libre (CMLL). He made his Mexican debut in early 2013 portraying a tecnico ("good guy") wrestling character. After a lengthy absence due to injury, he returned in August 2014 as a rudo ("bad guy"). He was one of only a few Australian wrestlers to work in Mexico.

== Professional wrestling career ==
=== Early career (2007–2012) ===
Forward started his wrestling career in 2007 in Australia. From 2010 to 2011, He worked as Taipan for Okinawa Pro Wrestling in Okinawa, Japan.

=== Consejo Mundial de Lucha Libre (2012–2015) ===
In late 2012, the Mexican professional wrestling promotion Consejo Mundial de Lucha Libre (CMLL) began showing videos of an unidentified masked wrestler, simply referred to as "Mr. 2013". Later on the promos revealed that the man in question was an Australian wrestler called Thunderbird. It was originally believed that Thunderbird was someone who had already worked for CMLL and appeared on TV under a different name and mask and others believed it was Chris Masters coming to CMLL under a new persona. In later promos Thunderbird's Australian accent confirmed that this was someone who had not worked for CMLL before, making him the first Australian to wrestle for CMLL. When he finally made his in-ring debut on 28 January 2013 his name was shortened to simply "Thunder". Thunder teamed up with Rush and La Mascara to defeat the trio of Averno, Mephisto and El Terrible. On 18 March, Thunder teamed up with El Terrible for a Torneo Increibles de Parejas (incredible pairs tournament) in Puebla, Puebla, the tournament featured tag teams made up of a tecnico ("good guy") and a rudo ("Bad guy") wrestler specifically for the tournament. Thunder and rudo El Terrible defeated the team of Ángel de Oro and Rey Escorpión in the first round, but lost to La Sombra and Mr. Águila in the second round and was eliminated from the tournament. In October 2013, Thunder teamed up with Tritón to compete for a shot at the CMLL World Tag Team Championship, but the team lost in the first round to Los Invasores (Morphosis and Kraneo). On 25 October Thunder made his debut on CMLL's Super Viernes ("Super Friday") show, the promotion's main show, teaming up with Rush and La Sombra as the team lost to El Terrible, Vangelis and Tama Tonga. In early 2014 Thunder stopped making wrestling appearances for CMLL, with no official explanation given for why he stopped working for CMLL. He later revealed that he suffered a leg injury that forced him to not compete while recuperating.

After an almost seven-month absence, Thunder returned to the ring during the 5 September 2014, Super Viernes show, entering the ring after the semi-main event match was over. To the surprise of the crowd, Thunder turned rudo by attacking Volador Jr., throwing him outside the ring. To underscore the severity of the attack, CMLL organized to have Volador Jr. taken from the arena on a stretch afterwards. The following day it was announced that Thunder would appear at the CMLL 81st Anniversary Show, teaming with Mr. Niebla and Euforia to fight Volador Jr., Máscara Dorada, and Valiente. The following week Thunder attacked Máscara Dorada after Dorada finished competing in a match, targeting his 81st Anniversary Show opponent.

On 5 June 2015, Thunder joined Dragón Rojo Jr., Pólvora, and Rey Escorpión as the fourth member of Los Revolucionarios. In June 2016 it was revealed that Thunder had been diagnosed with an unidentified form of cancer, which explained his disappearance from CMLL near the end of 2015.

== Death ==
On 30 June 2016, Fordward died from stomach cancer; he was 34 years old.
