= El Terrible =

Mexican professional wrestler

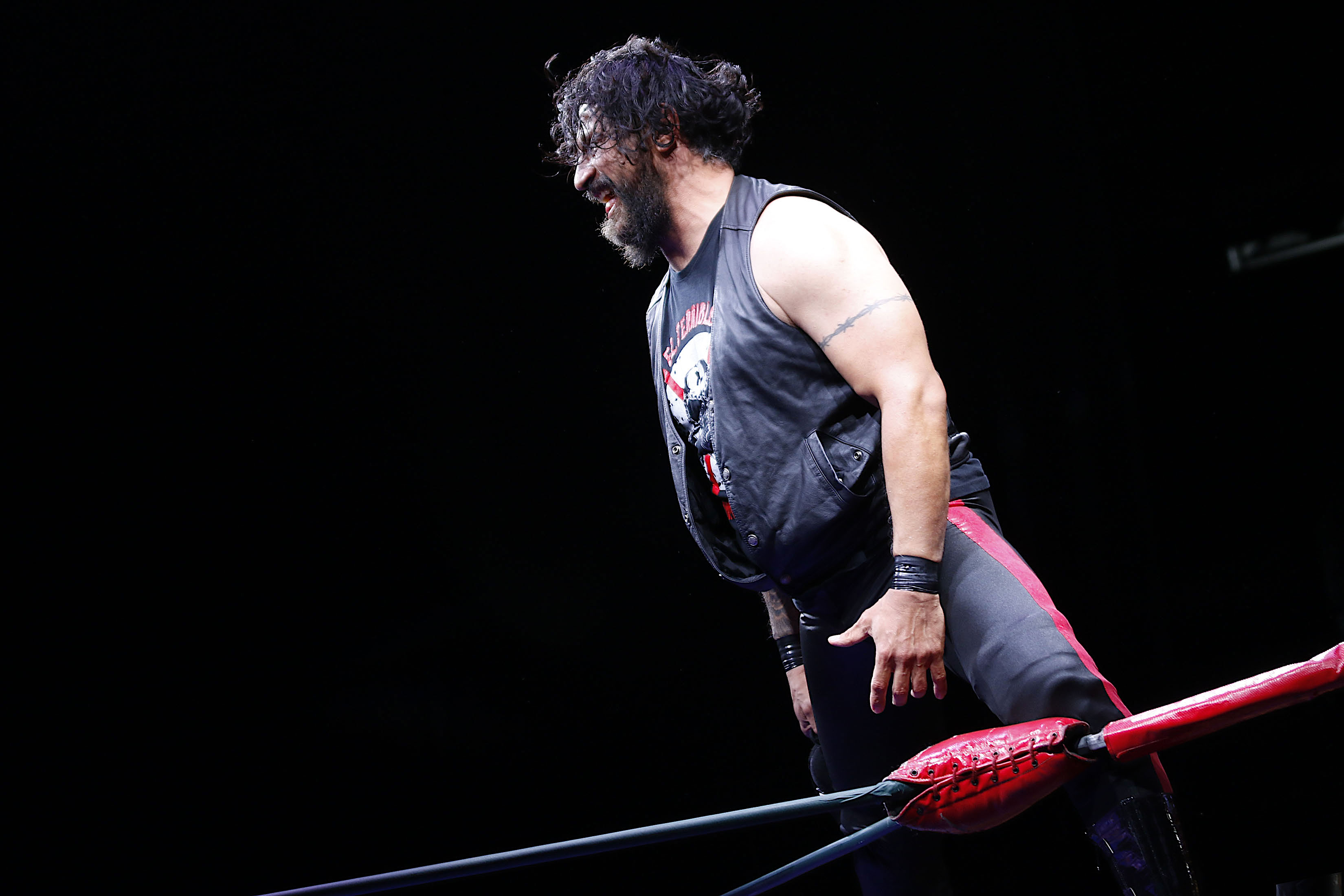
- El Terrible in July 2020

Personal information
- Born: Damián Gutiérrez Hernández; April 12, 1976 (age 50) Monterrey, Nuevo León

Professional wrestling career
- Ring names: Damián el Terrible; El Terrible; Engendro del Mal
- Billed height: 1.85 m (6 ft 1 in)
- Billed weight: 105 kg (231 lb)
- Trained by: Relámpago Ramírez; Viento Negro; El Satánico; Shu el Guerrero
- Debut: 1992

Damián Gutiérrez Hernández (born April 12, 1976), better known by his ring name El Terrible, is a Mexican professional wrestler who works for the Mexican promotion Consejo Mundial de Lucha Libre (CMLL). He portrays a rudo ("bad guy") wrestling character. He started out under the ring name Engendro del Mal ("Spawn of Evil") and later adopted the name Damián El Terrible, before being shortened to his current name.

His CMLL career started in 2002 and included winning the CMLL World Heavyweight Championship, the Mexican National Heavyweight Championship, the CMLL World Tag Team Championship twice, with Tama Tonga and Rush, the CMLL World Trios Championship with Héctor Garza and Tarzan Boy. During his time in CMLL, he has also won several major tournaments, including the 2008 Leyenda Azul, the 2012 and 2019 Universal Championship, the 2012 Gran Alternativa with Euforia and the 2015 and 2018 Torneo Nacional de Parejas Increíbles with Máximo and Rush respectively.

Gutiérrez is currently the leader of Los Nuevos Ingobernables, alongside Ángel de Oro and Niebla Roja; he was the last remaining member of Los Ingobernables ("The Ungovernables") following the departure of leader Rush and his father La Bestia del Ring from the promotion. He was originally brought into CMLL as part of Los Guapos ("The Handsome Ones"), then later joined CMLL's main rudo faction Los Perros del Mal. When Los Perros del Mal left CMLL El Terrible was put together with Rey Bucanero and Texano Jr. to form La Fuerza TRT.

== Professional wrestling career ==
Gutiérrez began professional wrestling in his native Monterrey and elsewhere for smaller independent promotions under a mask as El Engendro del Mal (Spawn of Evil).

=== Consejo Mundial de Lucha Libre (2002–current) ===
In 2002, he debuted in Consejo Mundial de Lucha Libre without a mask as Damián El Terrible but later the "Damián" part of his name was dropped, possibly to alleviate any confusion with Damián 666.

==== Los Guapos (2002–2004) ====
He was part of Shocker's first "University of 1000% Guapos," a group of undercarders competing for a spot in Shocker's Los Guapos group. El Terrible was chosen to be the third of the trio with Shocker and Máscara Mágica and the group feuded with Los Talibanes (Emilio Charles Jr., Bestia Salvaje and Scorpio Jr.), who were previously known as "Los Guapos". The two groups faced off in a cage match in August 2003 where Terrible and Bestia Salvaje were the last two left in the cage. Terrible pinned Salvaje, meaning Salvaje would have his head shaved. Over the winter, Los Guapos started feuding with Los Capos leading to Terrible teaming with Perro Aguayo Jr. against Cien Caras and Máscara Año 2000 on CMLL's Homenaje a Dos Leyendas: El Santo y Salvador Lutteroth show in 2004 in a double hair vs hair match. Terrible and Aguayo won but Terrible started breaking off from Los Guapos. He fully turned into a rudo (villain) and feuded with Máscara Mágica, taking his hair the following month in a main event match in Arena México.

==== La Furia del Norte / Los Perros del Mal (2004–2008) ====
The natural feud with Shocker never really took off as expected and Terrible ended up joining Perro Aguayo's La Furia del Norte group. He formed a trio with Héctor Garza and Tarzan Boy that won the CMLL World Trios Championship by defeating titleholders Canek, Black Warrior and Rayo de Jalisco Jr. in November. Terrible joined Aguayo's new Los Perros del Mal group in early 2005 but suffered an orbital fracture while wrestling in Puerto Rico for the World Wrestling Council. He returned in September and immediately became involved in Los Perros' feud with Los Guerreros del Infierno.

On May 11, 2008, he and Damian 666 lost to The Hell Warriors (Animal and Power) in Mexico City in a match for the then recently vacated UWA World Tag Team Championship.

==== Los Hijos del Averno (2008–2011) ====
In the fall of 2009 El Terrible and El Texano Jr. became involved in a long running "Mexico vs. Japan" storyline that had been going on since the summer as they began working with the Japanese duo No Limit (Yujiro and Naito). On December 4, 2009 Terrible and Texano Jr. defeated No Limit in a Luchas de Apuesta hair vs. hair match that was the main event of CMLL's Sin Salida show. After the match both members of No Limit had their heads shaved completely bald per Lucha libre traditions. On February 14, 2010 Terrible and Texano Jr. travelled to Japan to challenge No Limit for the IWGP Tag Team Championship, but were not able to defeat No Limit in their home country. In October and November 2010, Terrible and Texano Jr. took part in New Japan Pro-Wrestling's 2010 G1 Tag League. After victories over Takashi Iizuka and Toru Yano and No Limit, Terrible and Texano Jr. finished fifth in their block and did not advance to the semi-finals of the tournament.

==== La Fuerza TRT (2011–2018) ====
In April 2011, El Terrible and El Texano Jr. left Los Hijos del Averno to form a new group with Rey Bucanero. The following month, the group was named La Fuerza TRT. On November 22, 2011, El Terrible's longtime tag team partner El Texano Jr. left CMLL. A week later, Tiger was introduced as the new third member of La Fuerza TRT. On December 25, El Terrible and Rush survived a torneo cibernetico match used to determine the two competitors in a match for the vacant CMLL World Heavyweight Championship. On January 1, 2012, El Terrible defeated Rush to win the CMLL World Heavyweight Championship for the first time.

The following April, El Terrible and Euforia won the 2012 Gran Alternativa. On August 31, El Terrible defeated New Japan Pro-Wrestling representative Hiroshi Tanahashi to become the 2012 Universal Champion. El Terrible's rivalry with Rush culminated on September 14 in the main event of CMLL's 79th Anniversary Show, where El Terrible was defeated in a Lucha de Apuesta Hair vs. Hair match and, as a result, shaved bald. On November 13, 2012 El Terrible and Tama Tonga won the CMLL World Tag Team Championship from Atlantis and Diamante Azul. In early 2013 Tama Tonga returned to Japan to work for NJPW, putting the status of the CMLL World Tag Team Championship in the air, leaving El Terrible and Tonga as the champions but no current plans for the two to even work in the same country.

In March 2013 El Terrible and Rush teamed up for the 2013 Torneo Nacional de Parejas Increibles like they had for the 2012 tournament, but the team lost in the first round to Dragón Rojo Jr. and Niebla Roja. Two weeks later they were on opposite sides of a six-man tag team match on the 2013 Homenaje a Dos Leyendas show where Rayo de Jalisco Jr., Shocker and Rush defeated Universo 2000, El Terrible and Mr. Niebla by disqualification. On April 7 at Invasion Attack, El Terrible and Tonga successfully defended the CMLL World Tag Team Championship against La Máscara and Valiente at New Japan's Invasion Attack event in Tokyo. On July 5, El Terrible returned for another two-week tour with New Japan and, during the first night, he and Tonga lost the CMLL World Tag Team Championship to Hiroshi Tanahashi and Jushin Thunder Liger. El Terrible worked the rest of the tour, which lasted until July 20, as a member of the villainous Bullet Club stable.

Upon his return to CMLL, Terrible and Bucanero kicked Tiger out of La Fuerza TRT on August 11 and gave his spot over to Vangelis. With Vangelis joining the group, the stable was renamed TRT: La Máquina de la Destrucción ("TRT: The Machine of Destruction"). In October, El Terrible, Bucanero and Tama Tonga formed the TRT and Bullet Club sub-group "Bullet Club Latinoamerica".

El Terrible's three-year reign as the CMLL World Heavyweight Champion ended on January 30, 2015, when he lost the title to Máximo in his first title defense in fourteen months. On March 6, El Terrible and Máximo won the 2015 Torneo Nacional de Parejas Increibles. On April 3, El Terrible, Rey Bucanero and Shocker formed a new trio named TGR (Terriblemente Guapo y un Rey, "Terribly Handsome King").

On October 29, 2017 El Terrible defeated Diamante Azul to win the Mexican National Heavyweight Championship.

==== Los Ingobernables (2018–2019) ====
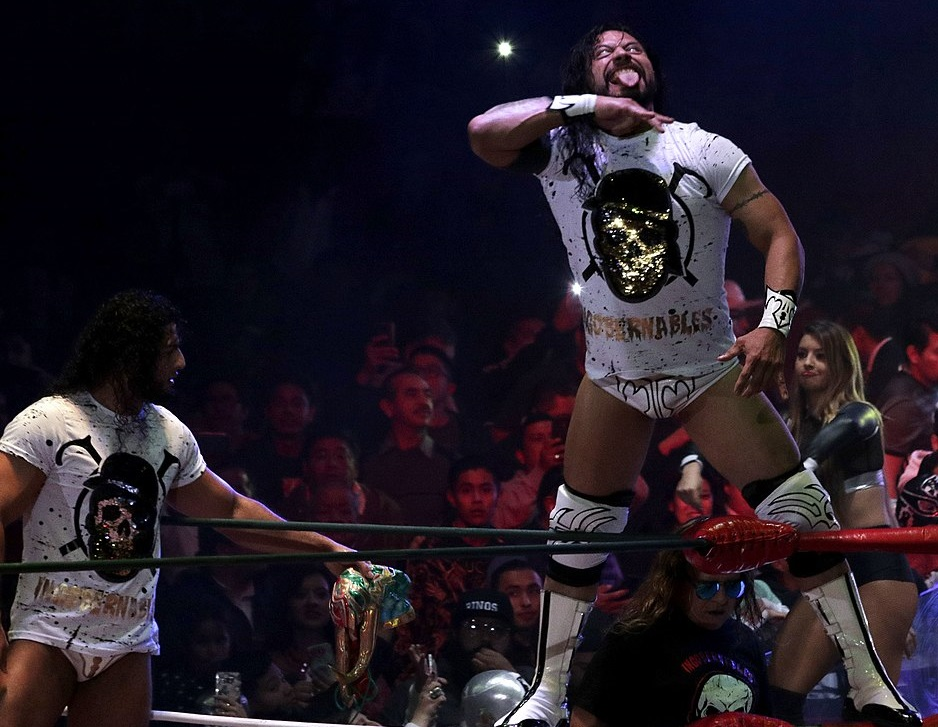
El Terrible (right) and Rush (left) wearing Los Ingobernables t-shirts in November 2018

On February 23, 208, El Terrible joined Los Ingobernables. The Universal Championship was the start of a storyline between Los Ingobernables and Los Hermanos Chavez (Ángel de Oro and Niebla Roja), as El Terrible cheated to defeat Niebla Roja with the help of La Bestia del Ring. After several matches between the two sides, they all signed a contract for a Luchas de Apuestas match as the main event of CMLL's 2019 Homenaje a Dos Leyendas event. On March 15, 2019 Los Hermanos Chavez defeated Los Ingobernables two falls to one, forcing both El Terrible and La Bestia del Ring to have all their hair shaved off. On September 27, Rush and La Bestia del Ring announced their departures from CMLL, effectively putting an end to the original stable.

==== Los Nuevos Ingobernables (2020–present) ====
On September 25, 2020, El Terrible was defeated by Diamante Azul for the Mexican National Heavyweight Championship, ending his reign at 1,062 days. At the 2020 Leyenda de Azul, El Terrible worked with Los Hermanos Chavez, which resulted in Ángel de Oro winning the cibernetico match. Afterwards, they continued to work together under the name Terriblemente Chavez, although Ángel de Oro and his brother were still referred to as tecnicos. On March 24, 2021, Los Hermanos Chavez cemented their rudo turn and joined El Terrible, forming Los Nuevos Ingobernables.

== Personal life ==
During a match in 2009 or 2010, Gutiérrez was accidentally kicked in the face during a match which caused him to have a 90% detached retina. He finished the match and would continue to wrestle without consulting a doctor until he felt the eye swell up. The doctor told him that he would lose his vision of it and offered to remove the eye, but Gutiérrez wanted to keep the eye even if he became totally blind in that eye. He later explained that he opted to keep the eye so he would not have to wear an eye patch.

== Championships and accomplishments ==
- Consejo Mundial de Lucha Libre
  - Mexican National Heavyweight Championship (2 times)
  - CMLL World Heavyweight Championship (1 time)
  - CMLL World Tag Team Championship (2 times) – with Tama Tonga, Rush
  - CMLL World Trios Championship (2 times) – with Héctor Garza and Tarzan Boy (1) and Dragón Rojo, Jr. and Bárbaro Cavernario (1)
  - CMLL Universal Championship: 2012, 2019
  - Copa Lutteroth-Bonales
  - Copa Pachuca: 2012 – with Rush
  - CMLL Torneo Gran Alternativa: 2012 – with Euforia
  - CMLL Torneo Nacional de Parejas Increíbles: 2015 (with Máximo), 2018 (with Rush)
  - Leyenda de Azul: 2008
  - Rey del Inframundo (2020, 2021)
  - Copa Bobby Bonales 2021
- CMLL Guadalajara
  - Occidente Tag Team Championship (1 time) – with El Texano Jr.
- Pro Wrestling Illustrated
  - PWI ranked him #20 of the top 500 singles wrestlers of the PWI 500 in 2014
- Other titles
  - Estado de México Trios Championship (1 time) – with El Hijo del Diablo and Bombero Infernal

== Luchas de Apuestas record ==
Winner (wager)	Loser (wager)	Location	Event	Date	Notes
Engendro del Mal (mask)	Baby Cameleón (mask)	N/A	Live event	N/A	
El Terrible (hair)	Bestia Salvaje (hair)	Mexico City	CMLL Live event	January 8, 2003	(Note: This was a Steel cage match that also included Shocker, Máscara Mágica, Scorpio Jr. and Emilio Charles Jr.)
El Terrible and Perro Aguayo Jr. (hair)	Cien Caras and Máscara Año 2000 (hair)	Mexico City	Homenaje a Dos Leyendas	March 19, 2004	
El Terrible (hair)	Máscara Mágica (hair)	Mexico City	48. Aniversario de Arena México	April 30, 2004	
El Texano Jr. and El Terrible (hair)	No Limit (hair) (Yujiro and Naito)	Mexico City	Sin Salida	December 4, 2009	
La Fuerza TRT (hair); El Texano Jr. and El Terrible	La Dinastia Alvarado (hair) (Brazo de Plata and Máximo)	Mexico City	Homenaje a Dos Leyendas	March 18, 2011	
Rush (hair)	El Terrible (hair)	Mexico City	CMLL 79th Anniversary Show	September 14, 2012	
Máximo and Volador Jr. (hair)	TRT: La Máquina de la Destrucción (hair) (El Terrible and Rey Bucanero)	Mexico City	Homenaje a Dos Leyendas	March 20, 2015	
Los Hermano Chavez (hair) (Ángel de Oro and Niebla Roja)	Los Ingobernables (hair) (El Terrible and La Bestia del Ring)	Mexico City	Homenaje a Dos Leyendas	March 15, 2019	
