= CMLL Universal Championship (2017) =

Mexican professional wrestling tournament

- Poster for the 2017 finals
- Promotion: Consejo Mundial de Lucha Libre
- Date: June 30, 2017 - July 14, 2017
- City: Mexico City, Mexico
- Venue: Arena México

Event chronology
← Previous; Torneo Gran Alternativa	Next → International Gran Prix

CMLL Universal Championship tournaments chronology
← Previous; 2016	Next → 2019

The CMLL Universal Championship (2017) (Spanish: Campeonato Universal) was a professional wrestling tournament produced and scripted by Consejo Mundial de Lucha Libre (CMLL; "World Wrestling Council"). The tournament started on June 30, 2017 and ran for three Super Viernes shows with the finals taking place on July 14, 2017 at Arena México in Mexico City, Mexico. The CMLL Universal Championship is an annual tournament exclusively for wrestlers who hold a CMLL-recognized championship at the time of the tournament. The tournament was first held in 2009, making the 2017 version the ninth overall tournament. Being a professional wrestling tournament, it is not won legitimately; it is instead won via predetermined outcomes to the matches that is kept secret from the general public.

The finals saw NWA World Historic Welterweight Champion Volador Jr. defeat NWA World Historic Middleweight Champion Último Guerrero to win the tournament for the first time. On the Universal Championship finals show Pierroth defeated Vangellys in a Lucha de Apuestas match, forcing Vangellys to have his hair shaved off. Atlantis was originally scheduled to participate in the match but was injured in the weeks leading up to the tournament. Atlantis was replaced by Diamante Azul, who held the Occidente Heavyweight Championship at the time, although he had not defended it since 2014.

== Background ==
The tournament featured 15 professional wrestling matches under single-elimination tournament rules, which means that wrestlers would be eliminated from the tournament when they lose a match. All male "non-regional" CMLL champions at the time of the tournament were eligible to participate in the tournament. The CMLL World Mini-Estrella Championship and Mexican National Lightweight Championship are both exclusively for CMLL's Mini-Estrella division and thus not eligible for the tournament. Regionally promoted championships such as the CMLL Arena Coliseo Tag Team Championship and the Occidente championships promoted in Guadalajara, Jalisco have not been included in the tournament in the past; only titles that have been defended in CMLL's main venue Arena Mexico, although exceptions have been made to allow New Japan Pro-Wrestling (NJPW) champions to compete if they were in Mexico at the time. Reigning Mexican National Light Heavyweight Champion was originally scheduled to participate in the Universal Championship tournament, but suffered a serious knee injury prior to the tournament and had to undergo surgery. CMLL replaced Atlantis with Diamante Azul, who held the Occidente Heavyweight Championship, although he had not defended it since 2015. This marked the first time an Occidente champion participated in the Universal Championship tournament.

For the 2017 version of the tournament 14 out of the 16 participants had competed in at least one Universal Championship tournament before. Soberano Jr. had won the Mexican National Welterweight Championship from Rey Cometa on May 13, 2017 to qualify for his first Universal Championship tournament. Hechicero was the other first-time competitor, having won the NWA World Light Heavyweight Championship from Rey Bucanero, winning his first CMLL championship.

=== Eligible champions ===
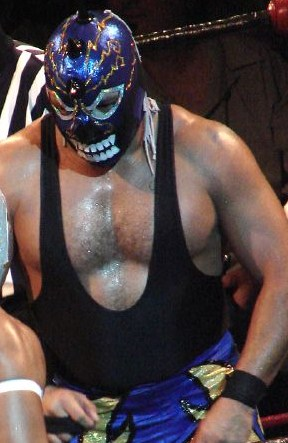
Mephisto, the only 8 time tournament participant

Champion	Championship held	Block	Ref(s)
Ángel de Oro	CMLL World Middleweight Championship	Block A	
Negro Casas	CMLL World Tag Team Championship	Block A	
Marco Corleone	CMLL World Heavyweight Championship	Block B	
Diamante Azul	Occidente Heavyweight Championship	Block B	
Dragon Lee	CMLL World Lightweight Championship	Block A	
Ephesto	Mexican National Trios Championship	Block B	
Hechicero	NWA World Historic Light Heavyweight Championship	Block A	
Luciferno	Mexican National Trios Championship	Block A	
Mephisto	Mexican National Trios Championship	Block B	
Místico	CMLL World Trios Championship	Block B	
Niebla Roja	CMLL World Light Heavyweight Championship	Block B	
Shocker	CMLL World Tag Team Championship	Block A	
Soberano Jr.	Mexican National Welterweight Championship	Block B	
Último Guerrero	NWA World Historic Middleweight Championship	Block B	
Valiente	CMLL World Trios Championship	Block A	
Volador Jr.	CMLL World Trios Championship; NWA World Historic Welterweight Championship	Block A	

== Tournament ==
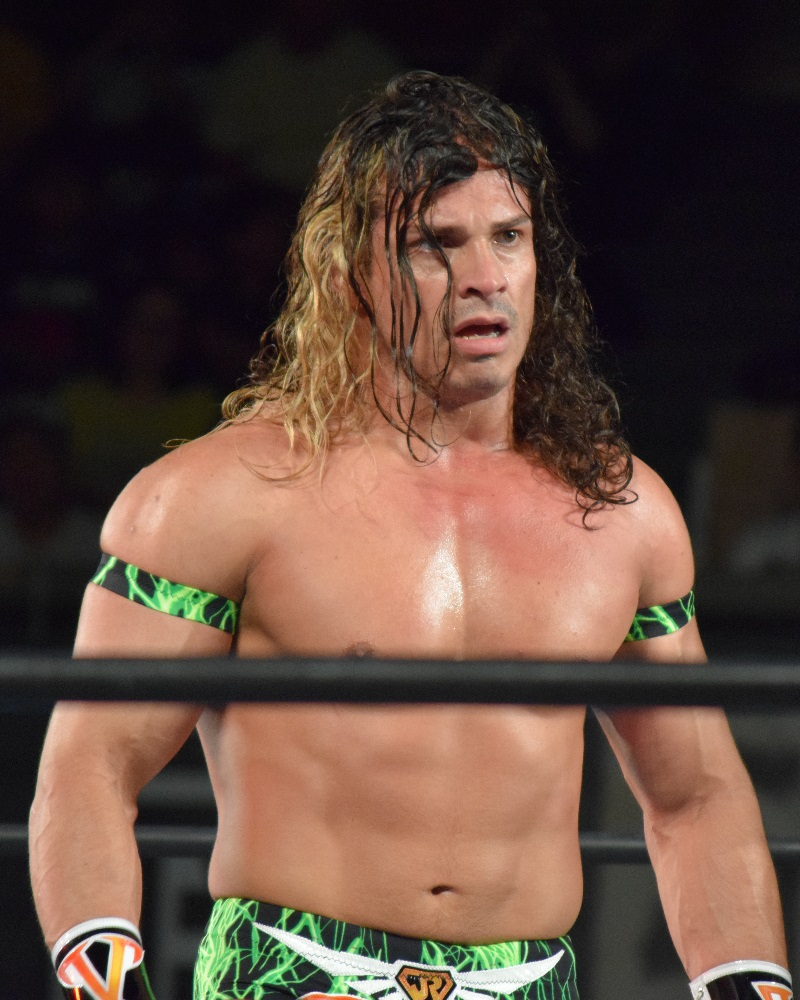
Volador Jr., tournament winner

First round
Shocker	W
Valiente	03:52
Volador Jr.	W
Hechicero	06:58
Negro Casas	W
Ángel de Oro	02:21
Dragon Lee	W
Luciferno	05:51
Diamante Azul	W
Ephesto	03:28
Último Guerrero	W
Marco Corleone	01:58
Místico	W
Mephisto	07:28
Niebla Roja	W
Soberano Jr.

Second round
Shocker	04:28
Volador Jr.	W
Dragon Lee	03:55
Negro Casas	W
Diamante Azul	03:22
Último Guerrero	W
Místico	05:31
Niebla Roja	W

Semifinals
Volador Jr.	W
Negro Casas	05:54
Último Guerrero	W
Niebla Roja

Finals
Volador Jr.	W
Último Guerrero	22:42

== Tournament shows ==
Super Viernes June 30, 2017
No.	Results	Stipulations	Times
1	La Sangre Dinamita (El Cuatrero, Forastero and Sansón) defeated Drone, Pegasso and The Panther	Best two-out-of-three falls six-man "Lucha Libre rules" tag team match	14:09
2	Guerrero Maya Jr., Rey Cometa and Titán defeated Pólvora, Ripper and Virus	Best two-out-of-three falls six-man "Lucha Libre rules" tag team match	15:47
3	Dragón Rojo Jr., Mephisto and Sam Adonis defeated Atlantis, Blue Panther and Soberano Jr.	Best two-out-of-three falls six-man "Lucha Libre rules" tag team match	15:19
4	Rey Bucanero, El Terrible and Vangellys defeated Misterioso Jr. and Los Ingobernables (Pierroth and Rush) by disqualification	Best two-out-of-three falls six-man Relevos increíbles tag team match	—
5	Dragon Lee and Luciferno defeated Volador Jr., Ángel de Oro, Valiente, Negro Casas, Shocker and Hechicero	2017 Universal Championship block A seeding battle royal	03:12
6	Shocker defeated Valiente	2017 Universal Championship first round match	03:52
7	Volador Jr. defeated Hechicero	2017 Universal Championship first round match	06:58
8	Negro Casas defeated Ángel de Oro	2017 Universal Championship first round match	02:21
9	Dragon Lee defeated Luciferno	2017 Universal Championship first round match	05:51
10	Volador Jr. defeated Shocker	2017 Universal Championship quarter final match	04:28
11	Negro Casas defeated Dragon Lee	2017 Universal Championship quarter final match	03:55
12	Volador Jr. defeated Negro Casas	2017 Universal Championship semi-final match	05:54

Super Viernes July 7, 2017
No.	Results	Stipulations	Times
1	La Jarochita, Princesa Sugehit and Silueta defeated Dalys, La Seductora and Zeuxis	Best two-out-of-three falls six-man "Lucha Libre rules" tag team match	12:58
2	Blue Panther, Pegasso and Rey Cometa defeated Sam Adonis, Misterioso Jr. and Virus	Best two-out-of-three falls six-man "Lucha Libre rules" tag team match	—
3	Ripper and Los Ingobernables (Pierroth and Rush) defeated Shocker, El Terrible and Vangellys	Best two-out-of-three falls six-man Relevos increíbles tag team match	—
4	Niebla Roja and Soberano Jr. defeated Último Guerrero, Diamante Azul, Mephisto, Marco Corleone and Místico and Ephesto	2017 Universal Championship block B seeding battle royal	02:56
5	Diamante Azul defeated Ephesto	2017 Universal Championship first round match	03:28
6	Último Guerrero defeated Marco Corleone	2017 Universal Championship first round match	01:58
7	Místico defeated Mephisto	2017 Universal Championship first round match	07:28
8	Niebla Roja defeated Soberano Jr.	2017 Universal Championship first round match	03:22
9	Último Guerrero defeated Diamante Azul	2017 Universal Championship quarter final match	03:36
10	Niebla Roja defeated Místico	2017 Universal Championship quarter final match	05:31
11	Último Guerrero defeated Niebla Roja	2017 Universal Championship semi-final match	07:31

Super Viernes July 14, 2017
No.	Results	Stipulations	Times
1	Akuma, Arkángel de la Muerte and Metálico defeated Astral, Sensei and Star Jr.	Best two-out-of-three falls six-man "Lucha Libre rules" tag team match	18:17
2	La Amapola, Dalys and Zeuxis defeated Marcela, La Vaquerita and Silueta	Best two-out-of-three falls six-man "Lucha Libre rules" tag team match	15:17
3	Sam Adonis, Negro Casas and Dragón Rojo Jr. defeated Blue Panther, Diamante Azul and Soberano Jr.	Best two-out-of-three falls six-man "Lucha Libre rules" tag team match	10:39
4	Pierroth defeated Vangellys	Best two-out-of-three falls Lucha de Apuestas, hair vs.hair match.	06:41
5	Carístico, Místico and Dragon Lee defeated Los Hijos del Infierno (Ephesto, Mephisto and Luciferno)	Best two-out-of-three falls six-man "Lucha Libre rules" tag team match	15:47
6	Volador Jr. defeated Último Guerrero	2017 Universal Championship final match. Best two-out-of-three falls match	22:42
