= La Bestia del Ring =

Mexican professional wrestler

Personal information
- Born: Arturo Muñoz Sánchez; April 7, 1969 (age 57) Tala, Jalisco, Mexico
- Children: Rush (son); Dralístico (son); Dragon Lee (son)

Professional wrestling career
- Ring name(s): Dr. Kent; Poder Indio; Poder Boricua; Poder Mexica; Toro Blanco; Comandante Pierroth; Pierroth; La Bestia; La Bestia del Ring
- Billed height: 180 cm (5 ft 11 in)
- Billed weight: 105 kg (231 lb)
- Billed from: Puerto Rico; Tala, Jalisco, Mexico
- Trained by: Diablo Velasco; El Hijo del Gladiador
- Debut: 1994

Arturo Muñoz Sánchez (born April 7, 1969), better known by his ring name La Bestia del Ring, is a Mexican professional wrestler working on the Mexican independent circuit as a member of La Facción Ingobernable. He is best known for his time in Consejo Mundial de Lucha Libre (CMLL). Muñoz is the father of wrestlers William Arturo Muñoz González (better known as Rush) and masked wrestlers Dralístico and Dragon Lee.

Muñoz has worked under various ring names during his career, most notably as Comandante Pierroth (or simply Pierroth), a successor to the original Pierroth Jr. He previously worked as Dr. Kent, Poder Indio, Poder Boricua, Poder Mexica and Toro Blanco. He initially joined CMLL in 2001 as a part of Los Boricuas, using the masked character Poder Boricua. When he returned to CMLL in 2013 as "Comandante Pierroth", he led his own version of Los Boricuas called La Comando Caribeño with Pierrothito, Pequeño Violencia, La Comandante and Zeuxis. As La Bestia del Ring, Muñoz was part of the Los Ingobernables ("The Ungovernables") stable with his son Rush and El Terrible until late 2019.

== Personal life ==
Three of Muñoz' sons have followed in his footsteps and became professional wrestlers; the oldest works under the ring name Rush, his younger son works as Dralístico (formerly known as the second Místico), and his youngest son debuted in 2014 as Dragon Lee. Three of Muñoz' brothers have also been involved with professional wrestling for a number of years; his brother Javier Descalza Coronado wrestled as Franco Columbo and then became one of the lead trainers for CMLL, while his younger brothers work under the names "Pit Bull I" and "Pit Bull II".

== Professional wrestling career ==
=== Early career (1994–2001) ===
Muñoz trained under world-renowned lucha libre trainer Diablo Velasco before making his in-ring debut in 1994. He first used the ring name "Dr. Kent", a generic doctor character in a white mask, white trunks and white tights in the tradition of Dr. Wagner. In subsequent years, he would work as "Toro Blanco" ("White Bull") and later joined Consejo Mundial de Lucha Libre (CMLL) as "Poder Indio" ("Indian Power"), another enmascarado character.

=== Consejo Mundial de Lucha Libre (2001–2019) ===
==== Los Boricuas (2001–2004) ====
In 2001, Pierroth Jr. formed a new group in CMLL called Los Boricuas, where all members either actually were from Puerto Rico or pledged their allegiance to Puerto Rico. Muñoz adopted the new name "Poder Boricua" ("Puerto Rican Power"), a new storyline nationality and ring gear adorned with the Puerto Rican flag. At the CMLL 68th Anniversary Show on September 28, Poder Boricua and stablemates Gran Markus Jr. and Violencia unsuccessfully challenged Mr. Niebla, Olímpico and Safari for the Mexican National Trios Championship. In early 2002, Poder Boricua and Gran Markus Jr. turned tecnico (wrestlers who portray the good guys), leaving Los Boricuas and feuding with them. Muñoz then changed his ring name to "Poder Mexica" ("Mexican Power"), complete with ring gear adorned with the Mexican flag. On July 14, he teamed with Mr. Mexico for a Lucha de Apuestas ("bet match"), where Poder Mexica put his mask on the line and Mr. Mexico risked his hair on the outcome; they were defeated by Veneno and Violencia, forcing Poder Mexica to unmask and reveal his real name, whereas Mr. Mexico's hair was shaved off.

==== Toro Blanco (2004–2013) ====
Muñoz dropped the "Poder Mexica" character in 2004, reverting to "Toro Blanco"; he subsequently left CMLL and worked under the name on the Mexican independent circuit. Over the following years, Muñoz shifted his focus from wrestling to raising and training his sons for a professional wrestling career. His oldest son, William Arturo Muñoz, made his debut in 2008; when he signed with CMLL in 2009, Muñoz accompanied his son for his introduction, making it clear that Rush (Wiliam's ring name) was his son. Rush wore ring gear similar to his father and earned the nickname "Toro Blanco". He would later be acknowledged as the father of Dragon Lee, later known as Místico, as well as the second Dragon Lee.

==== Pierroth (2013–2017) ====
In 2013, CMLL introduced a version of Pierroth, paying the original, retired owner of the character for the use of the mask and name. Muñoz was introduced as the masked "Comandante Pierroth", leader of La Comando Caribeño ("The Caribbean Commando"), consisting of himself, Pierrothito, Pequeno Violeñcia, La Comandante and Zeuxis. The group existed more in name than as an actual team, there were no regular size male competitors for Comandante Pierroth to team up with for matches. During 2014, Comandante Pierroth, sometimes billed simply as Pierroth, began teaming on a regular basis with Misterioso Jr. and Sagrado. In early 2015, the trio was officially acknowledged as working under the name La Comando Caribeno, adopting the imagery of the Puerto Rican flag in their ring gear. On March 18, 2016, Pierroth joined his son Rush's Los Ingobernables stable by helping him defeat Máximo Sexy in a hair vs. hair Lucha de Apuestas. On March 17, 2017, at Homenaje a Dos Leyendas, Pierroth lost his mask to Diamante Azul in a Lucha de Apuestas.

==== La Bestia del Ring (2017–2019) ====
After unmasking, Muñoz began using the name La Bestia del Ring ("The Beast of the Ring"). He became involved in a storyline feud with fellow rudo Vangelly over Vangelly's desire to join Los Ingobernables, which was rejected by both Bestia del Ring and Rush. The storyline built to a "hair vs. hair" Lucha de Apuestas between the two as part of the 2017 Universal Championship finals show, which ended with Vangellys both defeated and shaved bald as a result. On February 23, 2018 El Terrible joined Los Ingobernables, teaming with Bestia del Ring and Rush for trios matches. The Universal Championship was the start of a storyline between Los Ingobernables (El Terrible and La Bestia del Ring) and Los Hermanos Chavez (Ángel de Oro and Niebla Roja), as El Terrible cheated to defeat Niebla Roja with the held of La Bestia. After several matches between the two sides, they all signed a contract for a Luchas de Apuestas match as the main event of Homenaje a Dos Leyendas. On March 15, 2019 Los Hermanos Chavez defeated Los Ingobernables, forcing both El Terrible and La Bestia del Ring to have all their hair shaved off.

On September 29, Muñoz announced that he had left CMLL and was now independent alongside his two sons, Rush and Dragon Lee, who had been fired by CMLL.

=== Lucha Libre AAA Worldwide (2019–2023) ===
On October 31, 2019, Rush and La Bestia would appear for Nación Lucha Libre, reuniting with former stablemate La Máscara. The trio dubbed themselves La Facción Ingobernable (based on the Los Ingobernables name from CMLL). On December 14 at AAA's Guerra de Titanes, it was announced that Rush, La Bestia del Ring, Killer Kross, L.A. Park and Konnan were forming a new version of La Facción Ingobernable. On June 10, 2023, it was announced that both La Bestia and Rush had departed AAA.

== Championships and accomplishments ==
- Kaoz Lucha Libre

- Kaoz Trios Championship (1 time) – with El Hijo de L.A. Park and L.A. Park Jr.

- Pro Wrestling Illustrated
  - Ranked No. 368 of the top 500 singles wrestlers in the PWI 500 in 2020

== Luchas de Apuestas record ==
Winner (wager)	Loser (wager)	Location	Event	Date	Notes
El Charro II (hair)	Toro Blanco (hair)	Guadalajara, Jalisco,	Live event	1990s	
Veneno (mask) and Violencia (hair)	Poder Mexica (mask) and Mr. Mexico (hair)	Mexico City	Live event	July 14, 2002	
Bestia Salvaje (hair)	Toro Blanco (hair)	Guadalajara, Jalisco	Live event	January 18, 2004	
Diamante Azul (mask)	Pierroth (mask)	Mexico City	Homenaje a Dos Leyendas	March 17, 2017	
Pierroth (hair)	Vangellys (hair)	Mexico City	Universal Championship finals	July 14, 2017	
Los Hermano Chavez (hair) (Ángel de Oro and Niebla Roja)	Los Ingobernables (hair) (El Terrible and La Bestia del Ring)	Mexico City	Homenaje a Dos Leyendas	March 15, 2019	
