= Los Ingobernables =

Professional wrestling stable

- Logo of Los Ingobernables

Stable
- Members: See below
- Name(s): Los Indeseables; Los Ingobernables; La Facción Ingobernable (AAA/ROH/AEW); Los Nuevos Ingobernables (CMLL)
- Billed heights: Corleone: 1.97 m (6 ft 5 1/2 in); Escorpión: 1.75 m (5 ft 9 in); Máscara: 1.75 m (5 ft 9 in); Naito: 1.80 m (5 ft 11 in); Pierroth/Bestia: 1.80 m (5 ft 11 in); Rush: 1.83 m (6 ft 0 in); Sombra: 1.80 m (5 ft 11 in); Terrible: 1.85 m (6 ft 1 in)
- Debut: April 25, 2014
- Years active: 2014–2019; 2021–2023 (CMLL); 2019–present (AAA/ROH/AEW)

Los Ingobernables (Spanish for "The Ungovernables") was a Mexican professional wrestling stable based in the Consejo Mundial de Lucha Libre (CMLL) promotion. It was formed in April 2014 by La Máscara, Rush and La Sombra, and has since become renowned as one of the top antagonistic groups in CMLL history. As members of the group, La Máscara has held the CMLL World Light Heavyweight Championship and the CMLL World Tag Team Championship alongside Rush, while La Sombra has held the NWA World Historic Middleweight and Welterweight Championships. Through CMLL's working relationship with New Japan Pro-Wrestling (NJPW), Tetsuya Naito joined the stable in 2015, eventually forming an offshoot group named Los Ingobernables de Japón in the Japanese promotion.

On September 27, 2019, founding member Rush and his father La Bestia del Ring announced their departures from CMLL. On December 14, Rush announced that he would be forming a new group, La Facción Ingobernable (Spanish for "The Ungovernable Faction"), which has since been featured in Lucha Libre AAA Worldwide (AAA), Ring of Honor (ROH), and All Elite Wrestling (AEW).

On March 24, 2021, CMLL announced the re-establishment of the group, dubbed Los Nuevos Ingobernables (Spanish for "The New Ungovernables"), led by El Terrible. By July 2023, Terrible had stopped teaming with Ángel de Oro and Niebla Roja, who were later billed as Los Hermanos Chávez in the promotion.

== History ==
=== Los Ingobernables ===
Throughout his career in Consejo Mundial de Lucha Libre (CMLL), Rush had been presented as a técnico or a "hero" character, but who had also occasionally showed villainous rudo tendencies during his matches. In mid-2013, this part of Rush's storyline was once again brought to the forefront as the crowd reaction to him grew more and more negative, leading to him eventually being dubbed "the most hated wrestler in CMLL", despite still officially being a técnico. Rush then formed a partnership with La Máscara, with whom he went on to win the Mexican National Trios Championship and the CMLL World Tag Team Championship. Rush then started storyline rivalries with Negro Casas and Shocker, as part of which Rush, La Máscara and Titán lost the Mexican National Trios Championship to Casas' La Peste Negra stable. Meanwhile, longtime técnico La Sombra also began experiencing negative fan reactions due to his rival Volador Jr.'s recent turn to the técnico side. The two storylines came together on April 25, 2014, when Rush, La Máscara and La Sombra first attacked Volador Jr. and then the trio of Casas, Shocker and Mr. Niebla. Though the three effectively became rudos, with CMLL dubbing Rush and La Sombra in particular as the two most hated men in the promotion's recent history, they refused to acknowledge themselves as such, instead calling themselves "técnicos diferentes". The trio was originally dubbed Los Indeseables ("The Undesirables"), before being renamed Los Ingobernables ("The Ungovernables"). Officially Los Ingobernables had no leader with the members billed as equals, however, CMLL fans perceived Rush as the leader of the group.

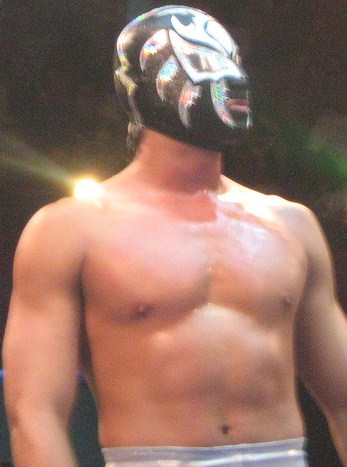
Founding member La Sombra

Following the official formation of Los Ingobernables, members of the trio continued their rivalries with Casas, Shocker and Volador Jr. On June 6, La Sombra faced Volador Jr. in a double title match, where the former's NWA World Historic Middleweight Championship and the latter's NWA World Historic Welterweight Championship were both on the line. In the end, following outside interference from both La Máscara and Rush, La Sombra was victorious, becoming a double champion. On June 13, Rush and La Máscara lost the CMLL World Tag Team Championship to Casas and Shocker. The rivalries both culminated on August 1 at El Juicio Final, where La Sombra lost the NWA World Historic Welterweight Championship back to Volador Jr., while Rush defeated Casas in a Lucha de Apuestas ("bet match"), forcing him to have his head shaved. In late 2014, Rush began sporadically teaming with his former El Bufete del Amor stablemate Marco Corleone. When Rush broke two bones in his ankle in November, Corleone took his place by La Máscara and La Sombra's side, becoming the fourth member of Los Ingobernables. Corleone remained a member of Los Ingobernables even after Rush's February 2015 return.

While he was touring CMLL in May and June 2015, La Sombra's New Japan Pro-Wrestling (NJPW) tag team partner Tetsuya Naito was made the fifth member of Los Ingobernables. Upon his return to NJPW, Naito formed his own Los Ingobernables offshoot group, named Los Ingobernables de Japón. On September 18, La Sombra was unmasked after losing to Atlantis in a Lucha de Apuestas at the 82nd Anniversary Show. In early November, Rush and La Sombra began having issues with each other, which led to a singles match between the two on November 13, where Rush was victorious. After the match, the two founding members of Los Ingobernables made peace with each other. It later turned out that this was La Sombra's final CMLL match as on November 19 it was announced that he had signed with WWE.

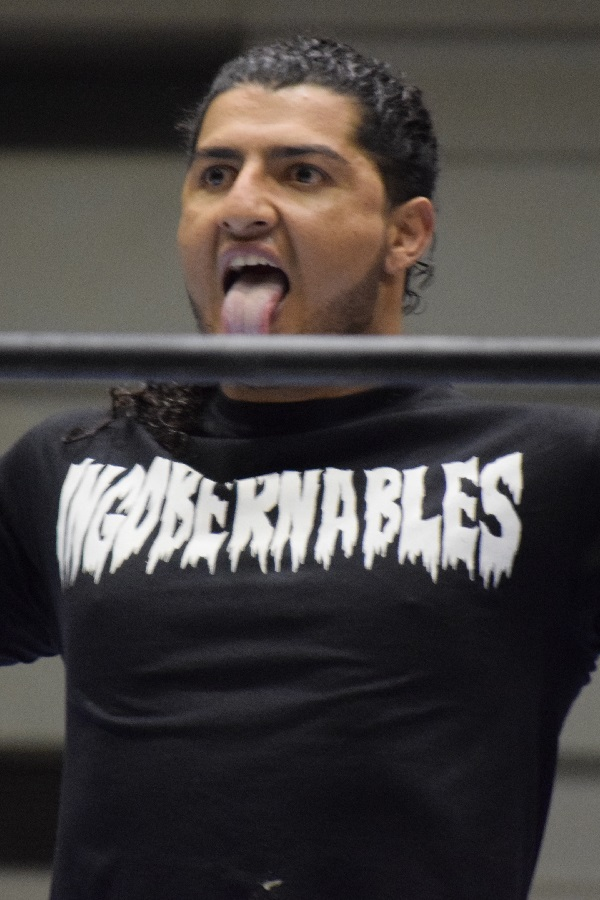
Founding member Rush representing Los Ingobernables in January 2017

During the February 19 Super Viernes show, Rush, La Máscara and Corleone faced Atlantis, Valiente and Rush and Corleone's former Bufete del Amor partner Máximo Sexy in a six-man tag team match. After failing to get along with his partners throughout the match, Corleone stood up for Máximo as he was being brutalized by Rush and La Máscara, leading the two to turn on him and kick him out of Los Ingobernables. On March 18 at the 2016 Homenaje a Dos Leyendas, Rush defeated Máximo Sexy in a Hair vs. Hair Lucha de Apuestas with help from his real-life father Pierroth, who became the newest member of Los Ingobernables. On April 8, La Máscara defeated Ángel de Oro to win the CMLL World Light Heavyweight Championship. On May 13, the three Los Ingobernables members were defeated by TGR (Rey Bucanero, Shocker and El Terrible) in a six-man tag team match, after which Rush and Pierroth turned on La Máscara and attacked him. After being saved by TGR, La Máscara announced he was quitting Los Ingobernables and challenged Rush to a Lucha de Apuestas. Afterwards, Rush announced Los Ingobernables would continue with him and his father as its only two members. On June 27, after weeks of teasing an alliance between Rush and Rey Escorpión, Escorpión abandoned his Los Revolucionarios del Terror stable and officially joined Los Ingobernables. On September 2, Rush and La Máscara reconciled, after the latter had lost his mask to Rush's real-life brother Dragon Lee. Though it was initially left unclear as to what this meant for Los Ingobernables, La Máscara eventually rejoined the stable, once again becoming its third member, following Rey Escorpión's departure from CMLL. On March 17, 2017, at Homenaje a Dos Leyendas, Pierroth lost his mask to Diamante Azul in a Lucha de Apuestas.

On May 22, CMLL publicly fired La Máscara because of an incident, where his family had destroyed Último Guerrero's car over backstage politics. With CMLL owning the rights to the Los Ingobernables name, La Máscara went on to form his own unofficial version of the stable on the Mexican independent circuit, dubbed Ingober Independientes, with his cousin Máximo, who had been fired alongside him, and former Los Ingobernables member Rey Escorpión. Shortly thereafter, Rush and Pierroth began teasing a new third member of Los Ingobernables. At the same time, the two began being accompanied by a man wearing a La Sombra mask. In September, Rush and Pierroth, with CMLL's blessing, began taking independent bookings with The Crash promotion, where they reunited with former stablemate La Máscara.

On February 23, 2018, El Terrible joined Los Ingobernables. The Universal Championship was the start of a storyline between Los Ingobernables (El Terrible and La Bestia del Ring) and Los Hermanos Chavez (Ángel de Oro and Niebla Roja), as El Terrible cheated to defeat Niebla Roja with the held of La Bestia. After several matches between the two sides, they all signed a contract for a Luchas de Apuestas match as the main event of CMLL's 2019 Homenaje a Dos Leyendas event. On March 15, 2019 Los Hermanos Chavez defeated Los Ingobernables two falls to one, forcing both El Terrible and La Besia del Ring to have all their hair shaved off.

On September 27, Rush and La Bestia del Ring announced their departures from CMLL, effectively putting an end to the original stable.

=== La Facción Ingobernable ===
On October 31, 2019, Rush and La Bestia would appear in Nación Lucha Libre, reuniting with former stablemate La Máscara. The trio dubbed themselves La Facción Ingobernable (often abbreviated as LFI - based on the Los Ingobernables name from Consejo Mundial de Lucha Libre). On December 14 at AAA's Guerra de Titanes, Rush El Toro Blanco teamed with Blue Demon Jr. and Rey Escorpión to defeat Psycho Clown, Dr. Wagner Jr., and Drago. After the match, it was announced that Rush, La Bestia del Ring, Killer Kross, L.A. Park and Konnan were forming a new version of LFI. The following day on December 15 at ROH's Final Battle Fallout, Rush introduced the American branch of LFI, including himself, Dragon Lee, Kenny King and Amy Rose.

Early 2020 saw two members leave the stable. La Máscara left in January, after Nación Lucha Libre closed down. Killer Kross ended up not representing LFI in the ring, and left in February when he accepted a contract with WWE. The AAA branch was further affected by Mexico's handling of the COVID-19 pandemic, so Rush El Toro Blanco and L.A. Park resumed their long-running feud on Twitter over the next couple of months, potentially setting up a hair vs. mask match. However, this was ignored by AAA, and L.A. Park represented the stable at Triplemanía XXVIII. In a match initially scheduled for Rey de Reyes, he partnered El Hijo de L.A. Park and Blue Demon Jr. (as Rush El Toro Blanco and Bestia del Ring were unable to work the event), where they were defeated by Los Psycho Circus (Psycho Clown, Monster Clown and Murder Clown). Post-match, L.A. Park and Blue Demon Jr. brawled with each other, continuing their feud from earlier in the year. Rush also began teasing a new member of the ROH branch, and at Final Battle, this was revealed to be La Bestia del Ring.

On September 4, 2021, it was announced that Dralístico had joined La Facción Ingobernable, alongside his father and his brothers. On October 9, at Héroes Inmortales XIV, Dralístico and Dragon Lee challenged Los Lucha Bros (Fénix and Pentagón Jr.) for the AAA World Tag Team Championship, after they had retained the title over Jinetes del Aire (Hijo del Vikingo and Laredo Kid). On October 27, ROH announced that they would be releasing all talent from their contracts and going on hiatus following their Final Battle event on December 11. This marked the end of the group's ROH branch.

On April 28, 2022, Vangellys joined the group. On May 29, 2022, Rush made his All Elite Wrestling (AEW) debut during the promotion's Double or Nothing pay-per-view, aligning with his former partner Andrade El Idolo and José the Assistant, starting a branch of LFI in AEW. In late 2022, Dralístico began to appear in AEW and Preston Vance was recruited to join LFI. Around the same time, Andrade quietly left LFI during recovery from an injury.

On June 10, 2023, both Rush and La Bestia departed AAA, ending the branch of LFI in the promotion.

In April 2024, José was released from AEW, ending his tenure with the group. From July to September 2024, Rush left LFI and joined the Don Callis Family, but would later rejoin LFI with Dralístico and The Beast Mortos with Jake "The Snake" Roberts as their manager. Preston would also quietly leave the group as well. Roberts would remain with the group until November, where they were taken off television and returned in February 2025 without Roberts. On August 29 at Death Before Dishonor, Sammy Guevara joined LFI after teaming with Rush to defeat The Outrunners (Turbo Floyd and Truth Magnum) to win the vacant ROH World Tag Team Championships. On November 28, Guevara and Rush were forced to vacate their titles due to Rush suffering a knee injury, ending their reign at 91 days. On December 5 at Final Battle, Guevara and The Beast Mortos defeated Adam Priest and Tommy Billington to win the vacant titles, giving Guevara his third ROH World Tag Team Championship reign. On June 26, 2026 at partner promotion CMLL's Viernes Espectaular event, Guvera and Mortos lost their titles to Místico and Máscara Dorada, ending their reign at 203 days.

=== Los Nuevos Ingobernables ===
On March 24, 2021, CMLL announced the formation of a new version of Los Ingobernables, dubbed Los Nuevos Ingobernables, which would see Ángel de Oro and Niebla Roja join El Terrible. As part of the stable, Ángel de Oro won La Copa VIP in 2021 and Ángel de Oro and Niebla Roja together won the CMLL World Tag Team Championship in January 2022.

On July 1, 2023, at CMLL, Los Nuevos Ingobernables would face the team of Tetsuya Naito, Bushi, and Titán representing Los Ingobernables de Japón in a 2 out of 3 falls match. Los Ingobernables de Japón would be victorious, kindling a rivalry between both splinter groups. The following week on July 7, Los Nuevos Ingobernables would lose in the main event to Los Guerreros Laguneros, marking the final time that Terrible teamed with Oro and Roja. On August 18, the CMLL Grand Prix saw Oro on Team Mexico and Hiromu Takahashi on Team Rest of the World. The rivaling Ingobernables members fought in the match and Takahashi would pin Oro, eliminating him from the match. This would essentially mark the end of the stable, as Oro and Roja reverted to simply billing themselves as Los Hermanos Chavez for their tag title defenses.

== Reception ==
In April 2016, Dave Meltzer of the Wrestling Observer Newsletter wrote that the Los Ingobernables concept of having Rush, once a babyface rejected by Arena México crowds, turn heel and "embrace the negative", had made him a "far more effective headliner".

== Current branches ==
*	Founding member
L	Leader

=== La Facción Ingobernable ===
This branch of the group primarily perform in the United States with All Elite Wrestling and Ring of Honor, while also appearing on the Mexican independent circuit.

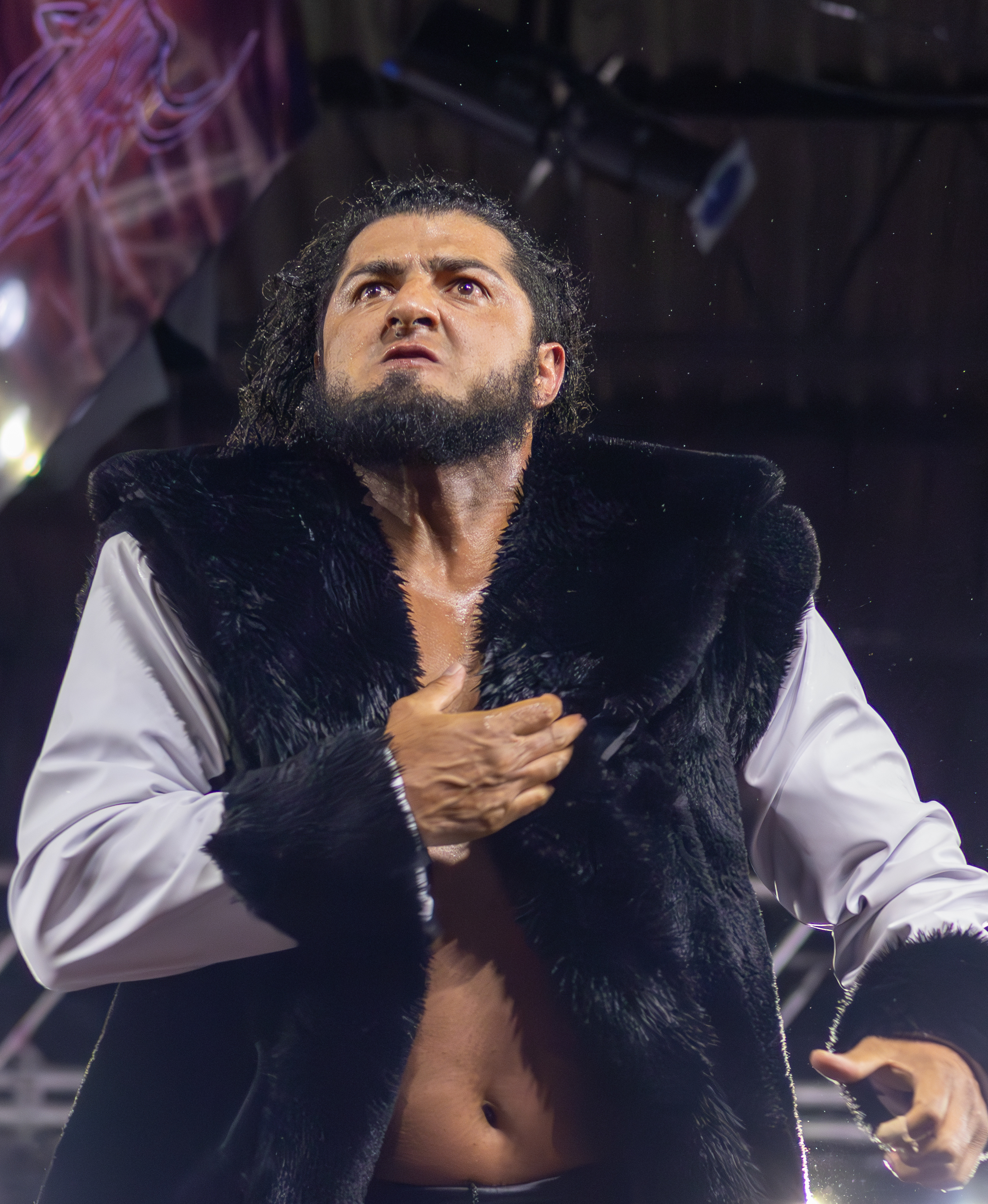
Rush (L)

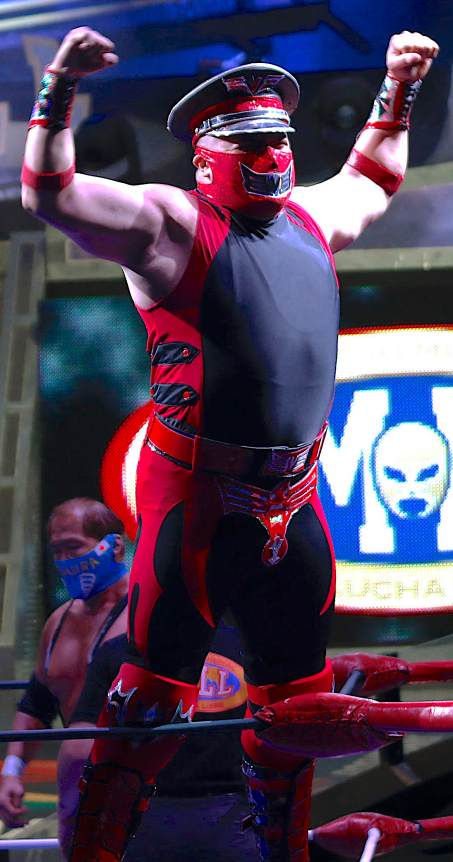
Vangellys

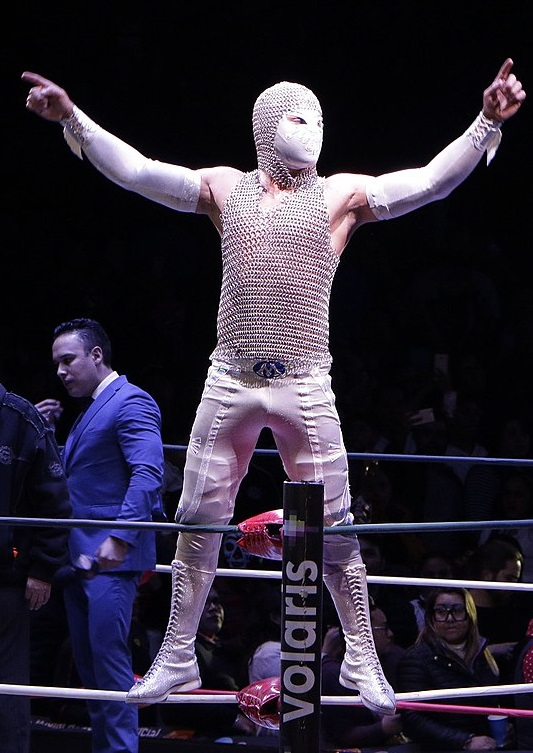
Dralístico

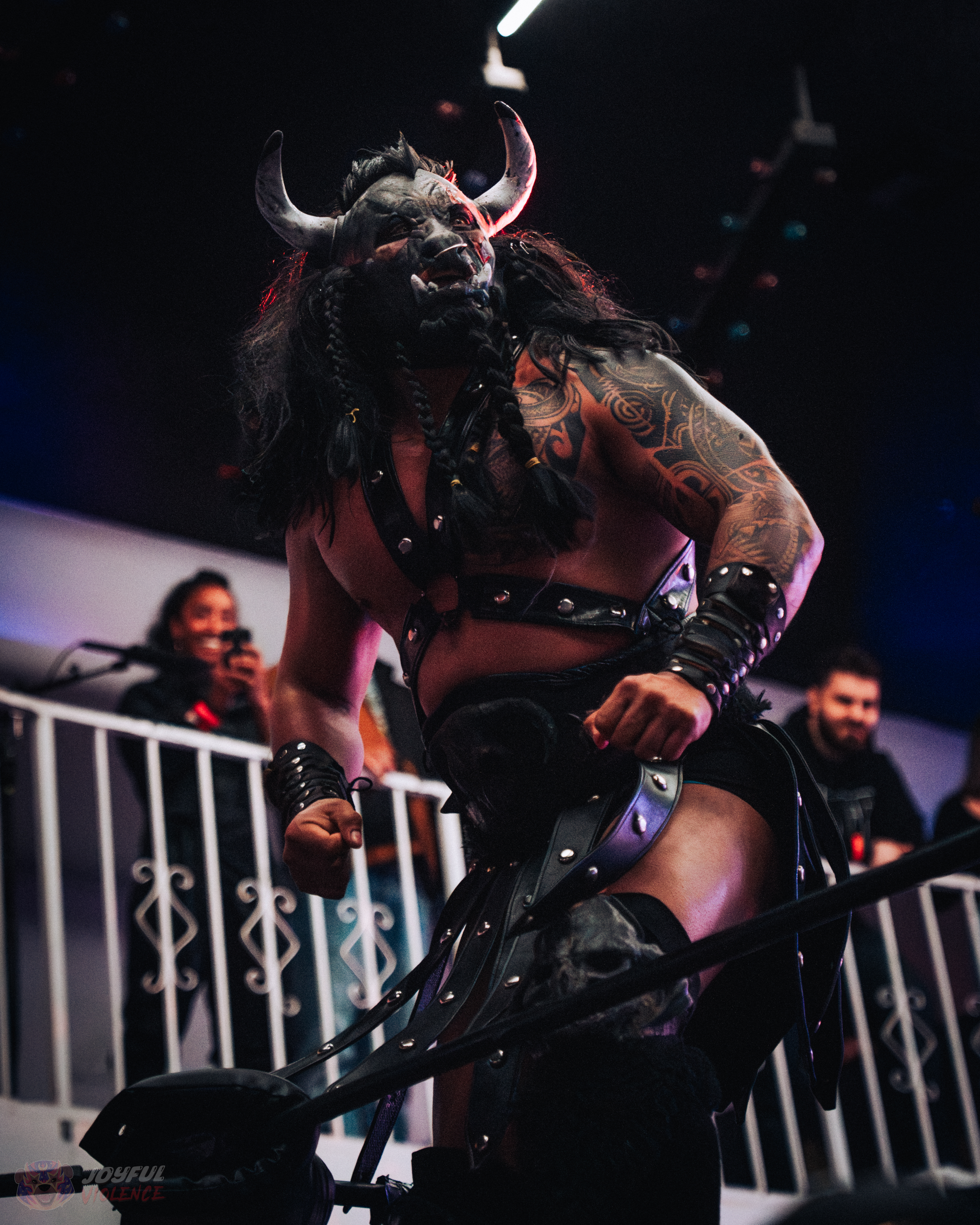
The Beast Mortos

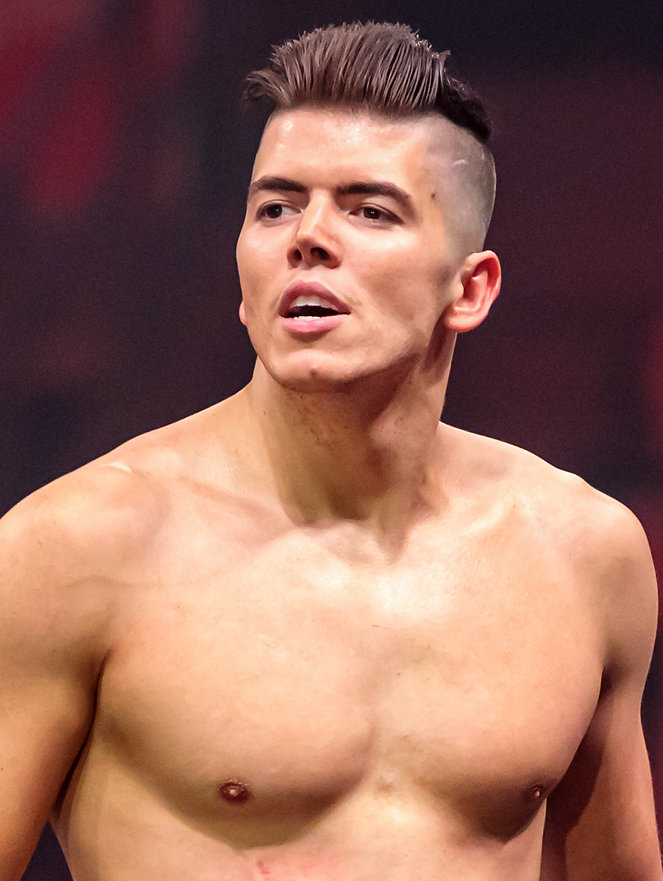
Sammy Guevara

==== Current members ====
Member	Tenure	Promotion(s)
Rush/Rush El Toro Blanco *(L)	October 31, 2019 – July 5, 2024; September 28, 2024 – present	Lucha Libre AAA Worldwide; Ring of Honor; Nación Lucha Libre; Independent Circuit; All Elite Wrestling
La Bestia del Ring *(L)	October 31, 2019 – present	Lucha Libre AAA Worldwide; Ring of Honor; Nación Lucha Libre; Independent Circuit
Dralístico	September 4, 2021 – present	Lucha Libre AAA Worldwide; Independent Circuit; All Elite Wrestling; Ring of Honor
Vangellys	April 28, 2022 – present	Independent Circuit
The Beast Mortos	September 28, 2024 – present	All Elite Wrestling; Independent Circuit; Ring of Honor; Consejo Mundial de Lucha Libre
Sammy Guevara	August 29, 2025 – present	All Elite Wrestling; Ring of Honor; Consejo Mundial de Lucha Libre

==== Former members ====
Member	Tenure	Promotion(s)
La Máscara *	October 31, 2019 – January 8, 2020	Nación Lucha Libre; Independent Circuit
Konnan	December 14, 2019 – May 30, 2021	Lucha Libre AAA Worldwide
Killer Kross	December 14, 2019 – February 5, 2020	Lucha Libre AAA Worldwide
Scarlett Bordeaux	December 14, 2019 – February 5, 2020	Lucha Libre AAA Worldwide
L.A. Park	December 14, 2019 – May 30, 2021	Lucha Libre AAA Worldwide
Kenny King	December 15, 2019 – December 11, 2021	Ring of Honor
Dragon Lee	December 15, 2019 – August 18, 2022	Ring of Honor; Lucha Libre AAA Worldwide; Independent Circuit; All Elite Wrestling
Amy Rose	December 15, 2019 – March 26, 2021	Ring of Honor
Andrade El Idolo	June 22, 2022 – September 28, 2022	All Elite Wrestling; Independent Circuit
José the Assistant	June 22, 2022 – April 1, 2024	All Elite Wrestling; Ring of Honor
Preston Vance	November 25, 2022 – September 12, 2024	All Elite Wrestling; Ring of Honor
Jake "The Snake" Roberts	October 8, 2024 – November 11, 2024	All Elite Wrestling

== Former branches ==
*	Founding member
L	Leader

=== Los Ingobernables ===
This branch of the group primarily performed in Mexico with Consejo Mundial de Lucha Libre.

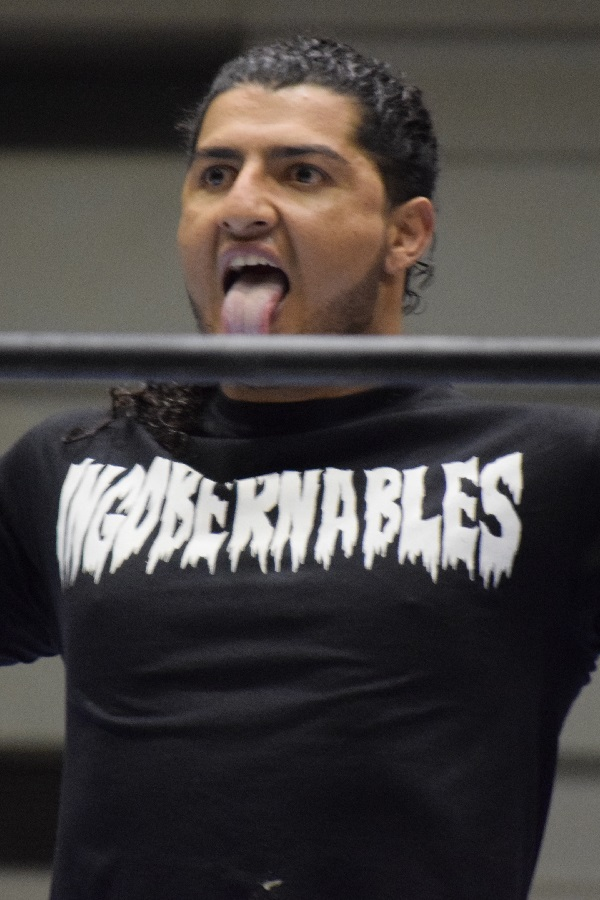
Rush (L)

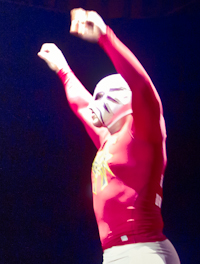
La Máscara

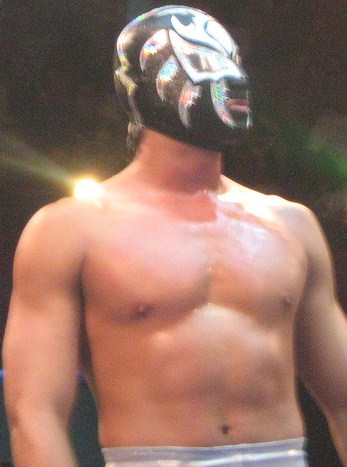
La Sombra

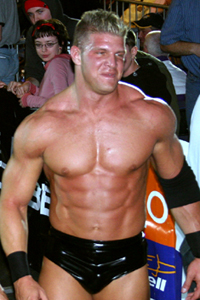
Marco Corleone

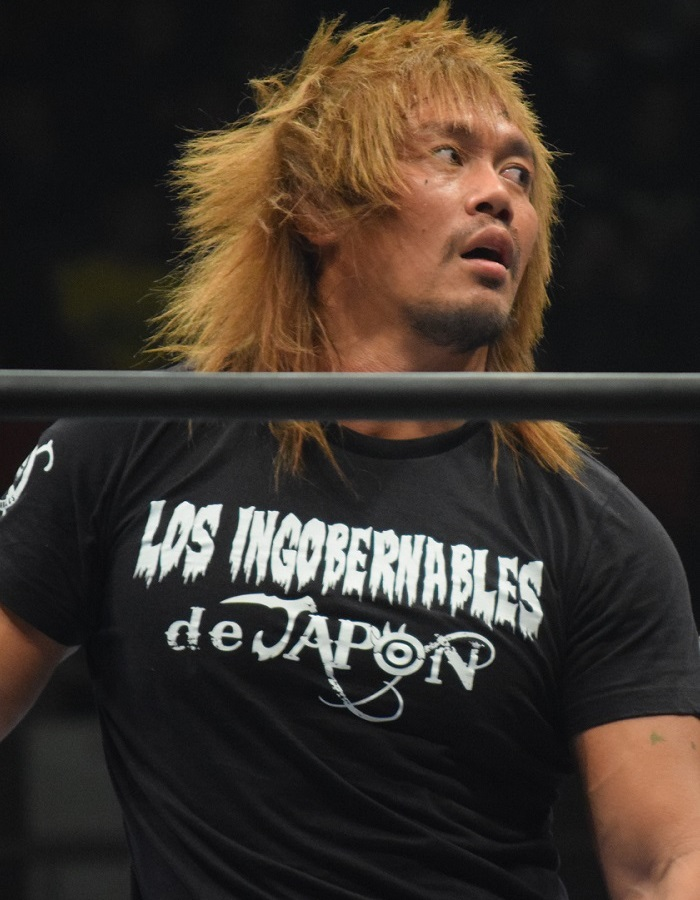
Naito

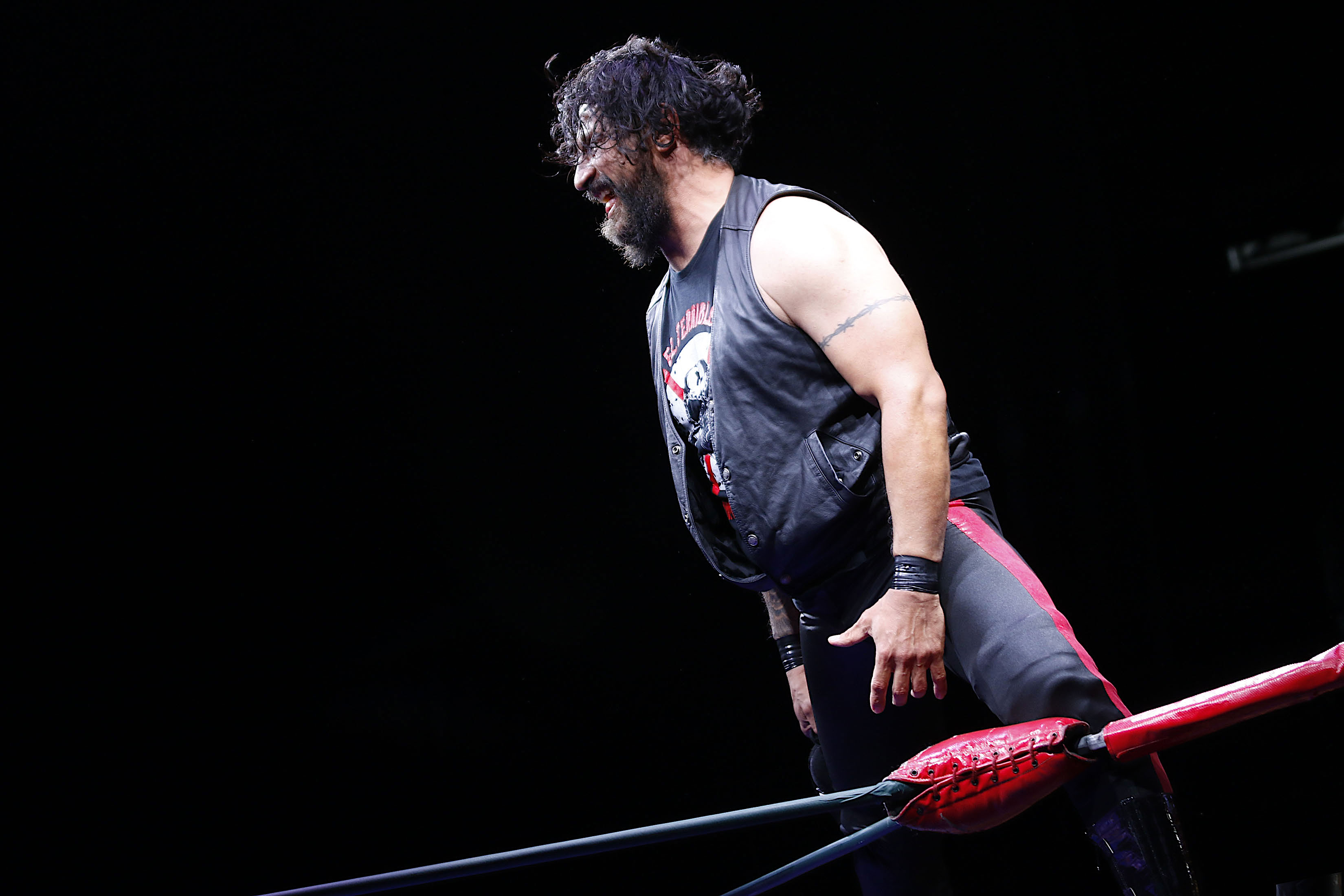
El Terrible

Member	Tenure
Rush *(L)	April 25, 2014 – September 27, 2019
La Máscara *	April 25, 2014 – May 13, 2016; September 2, 2016 – May 22, 2017
La Sombra *	April 25, 2014 – November 13, 2015
Marco Corleone	November 14, 2014 – February 19, 2016
Naito	May 27, 2015 – September 27, 2019
Pierroth/La Bestia del Ring	March 18, 2016 – September 27, 2019
Rey Escorpión	June 27, 2016 – September 18, 2016
El Terrible	February 23, 2018 – September 27, 2019

=== Los Ingobernables de Japón ===
This branch of the group primarily performed in Japan with New Japan Pro-Wrestling.

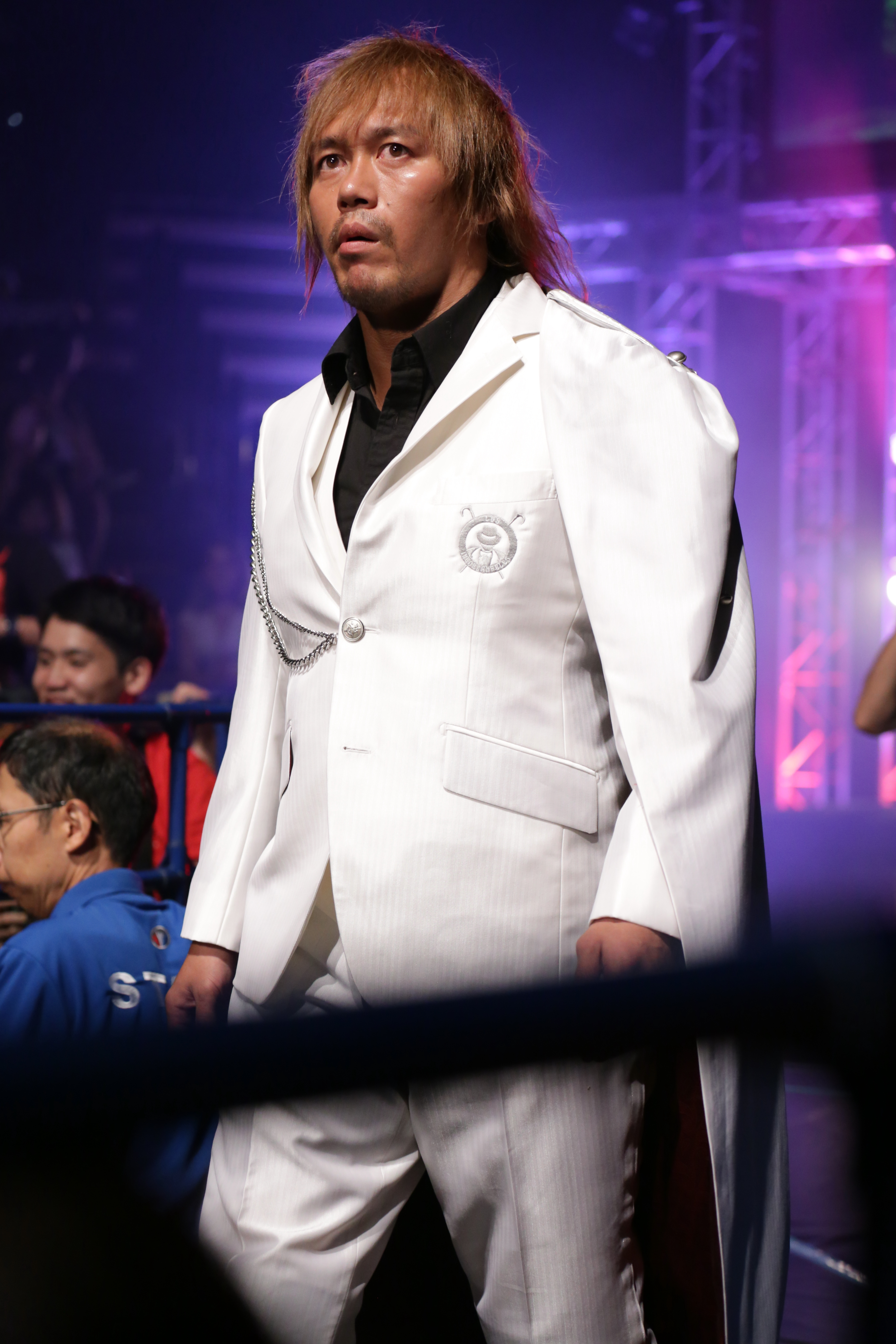
Tetsuya Naito (L)

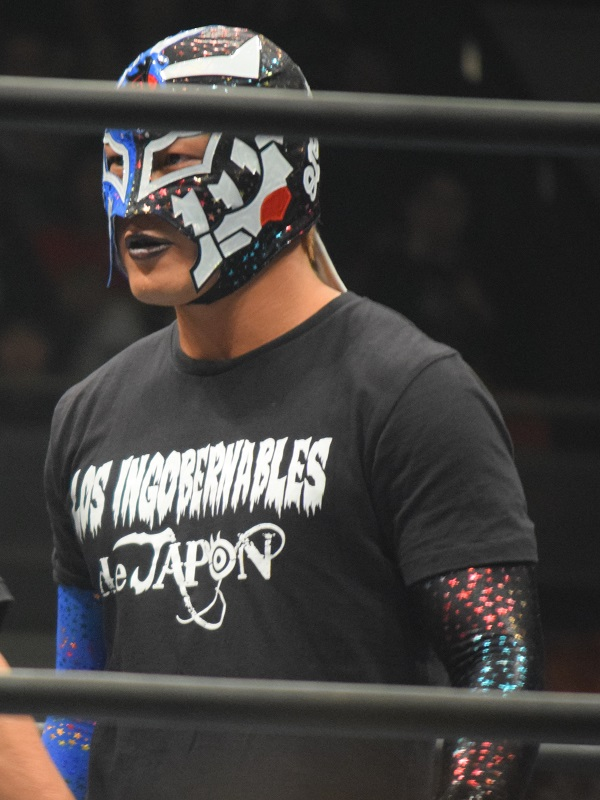
Bushi

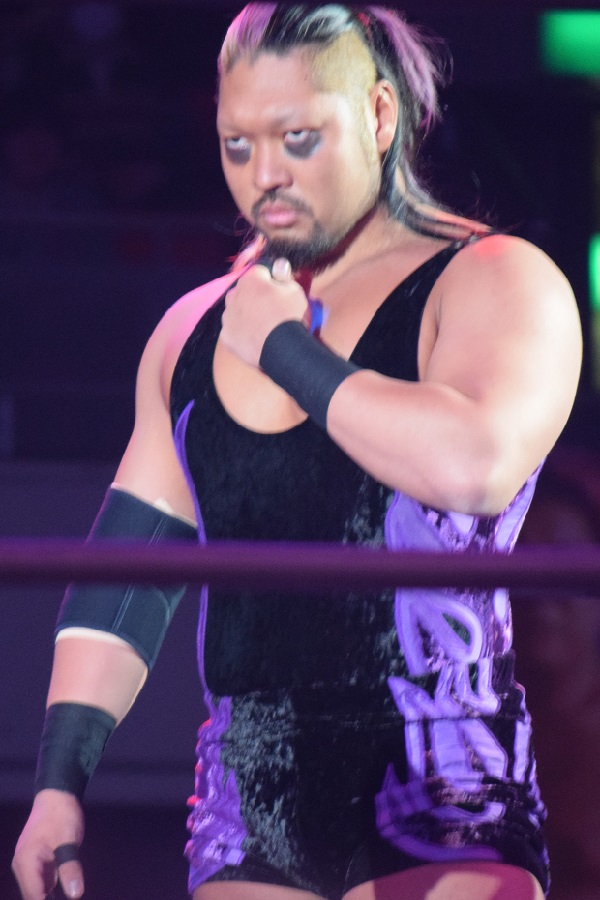
Evil

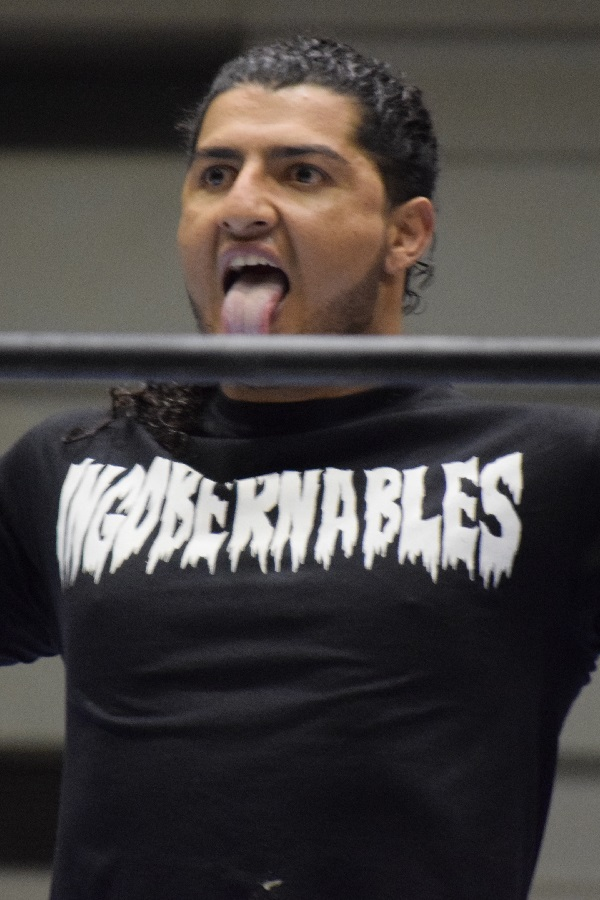
Rush

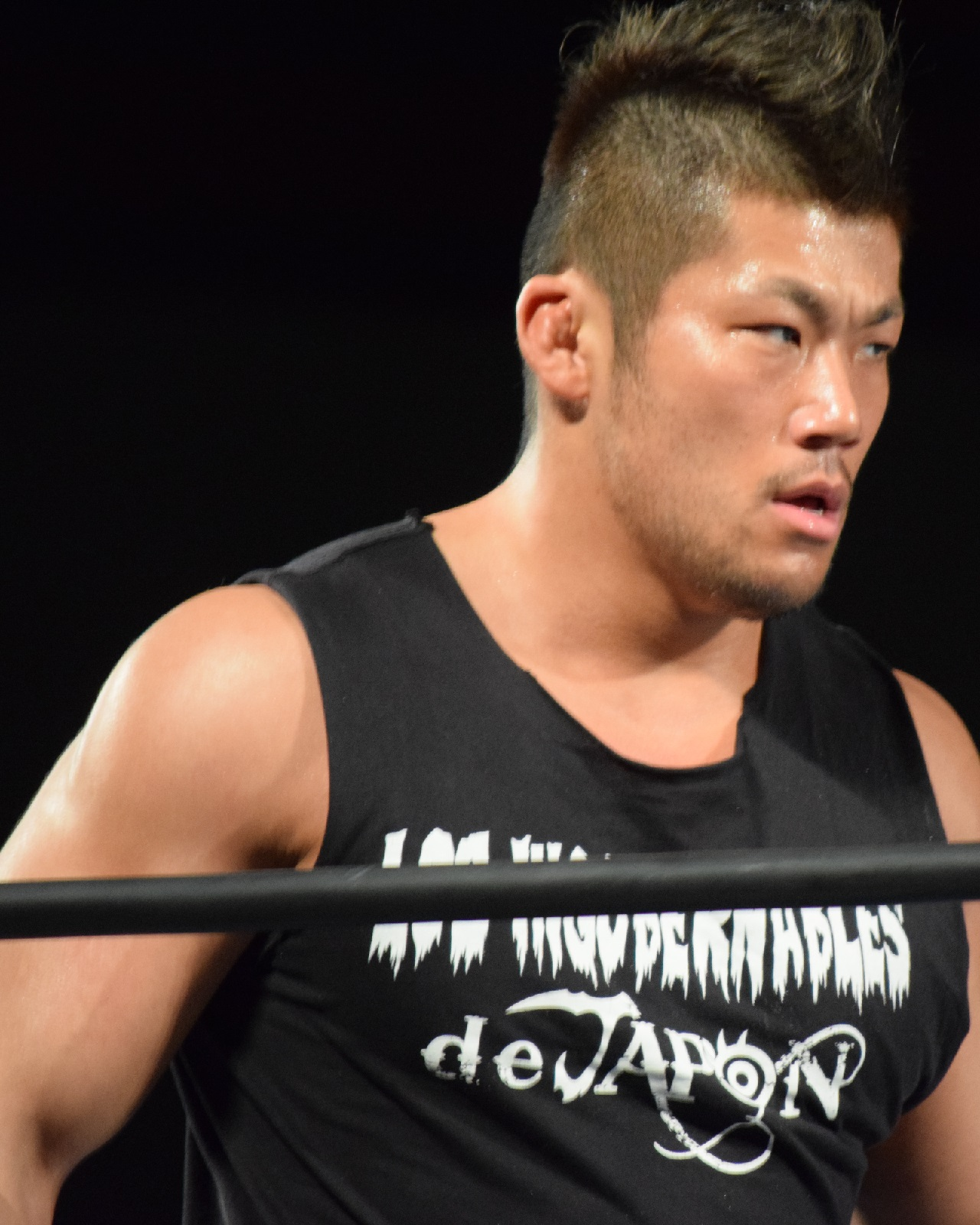
Sanada

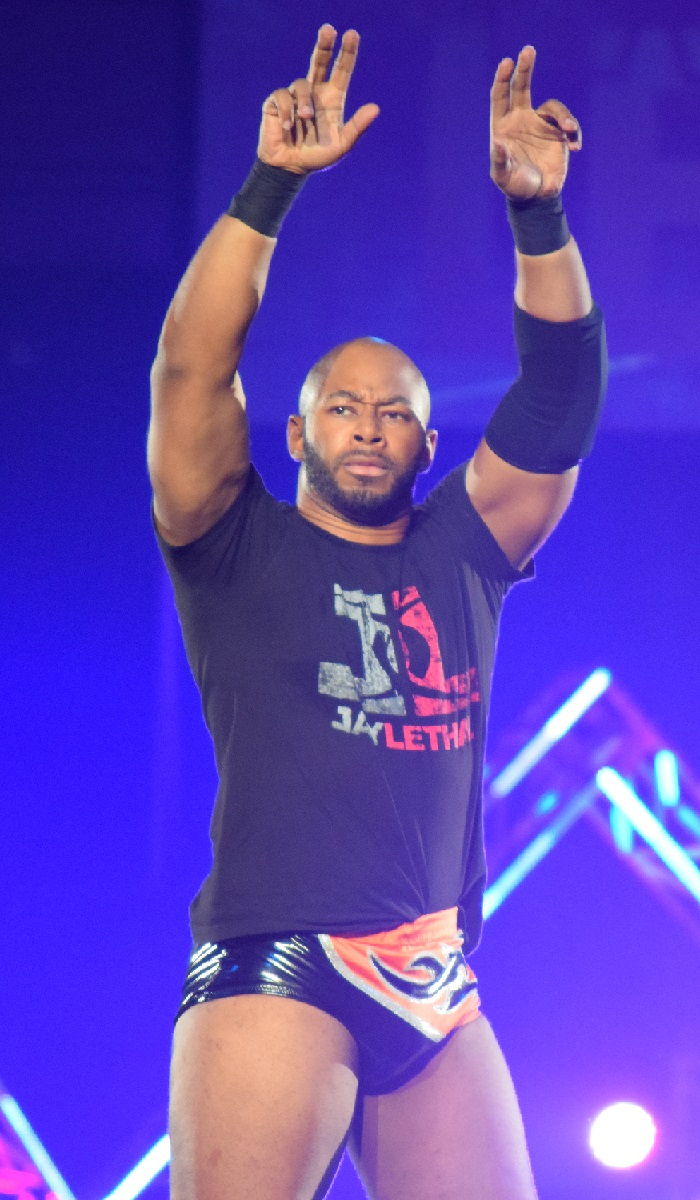
Jay Lethal

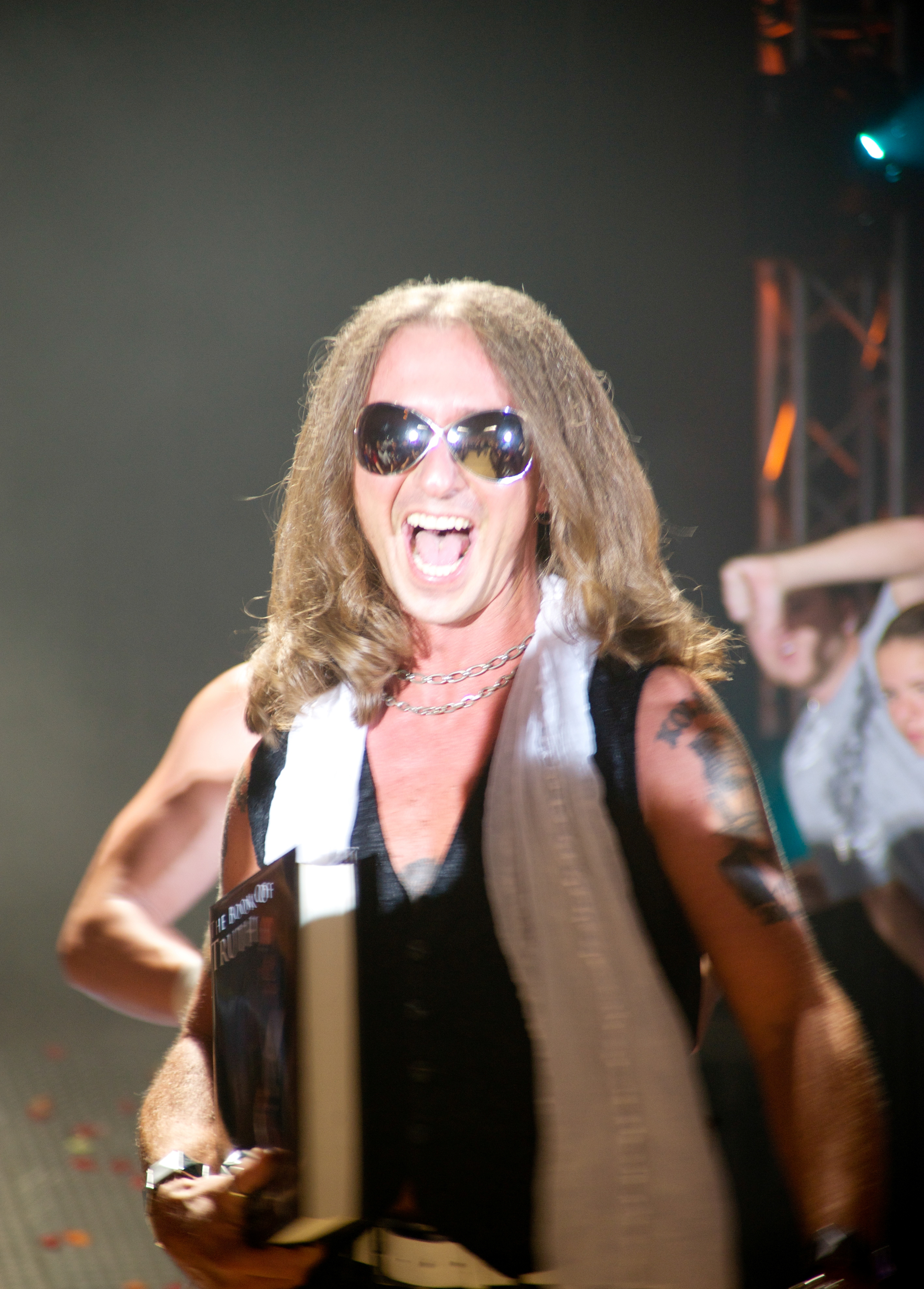
Truth Martini

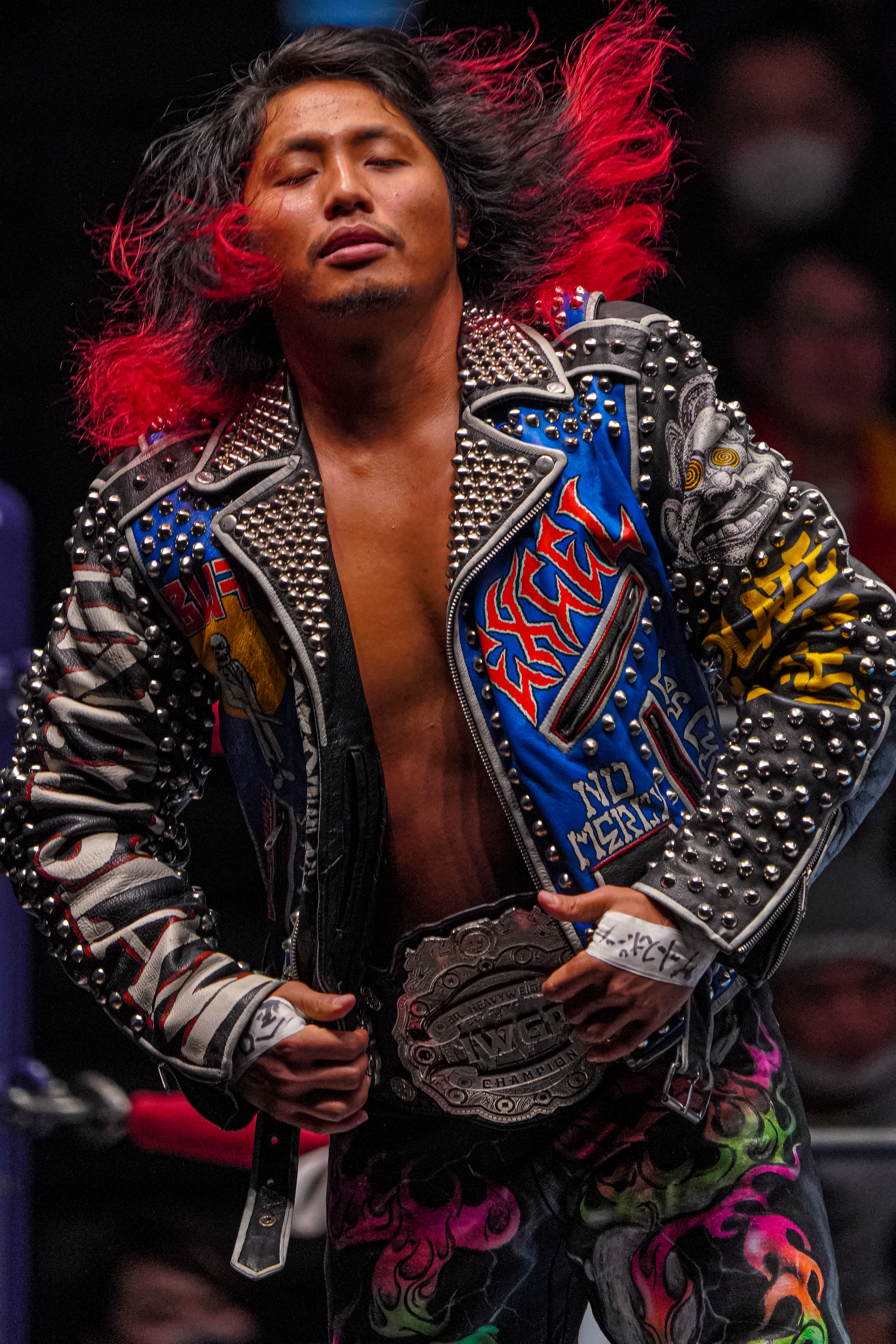
Hiromu Takahashi

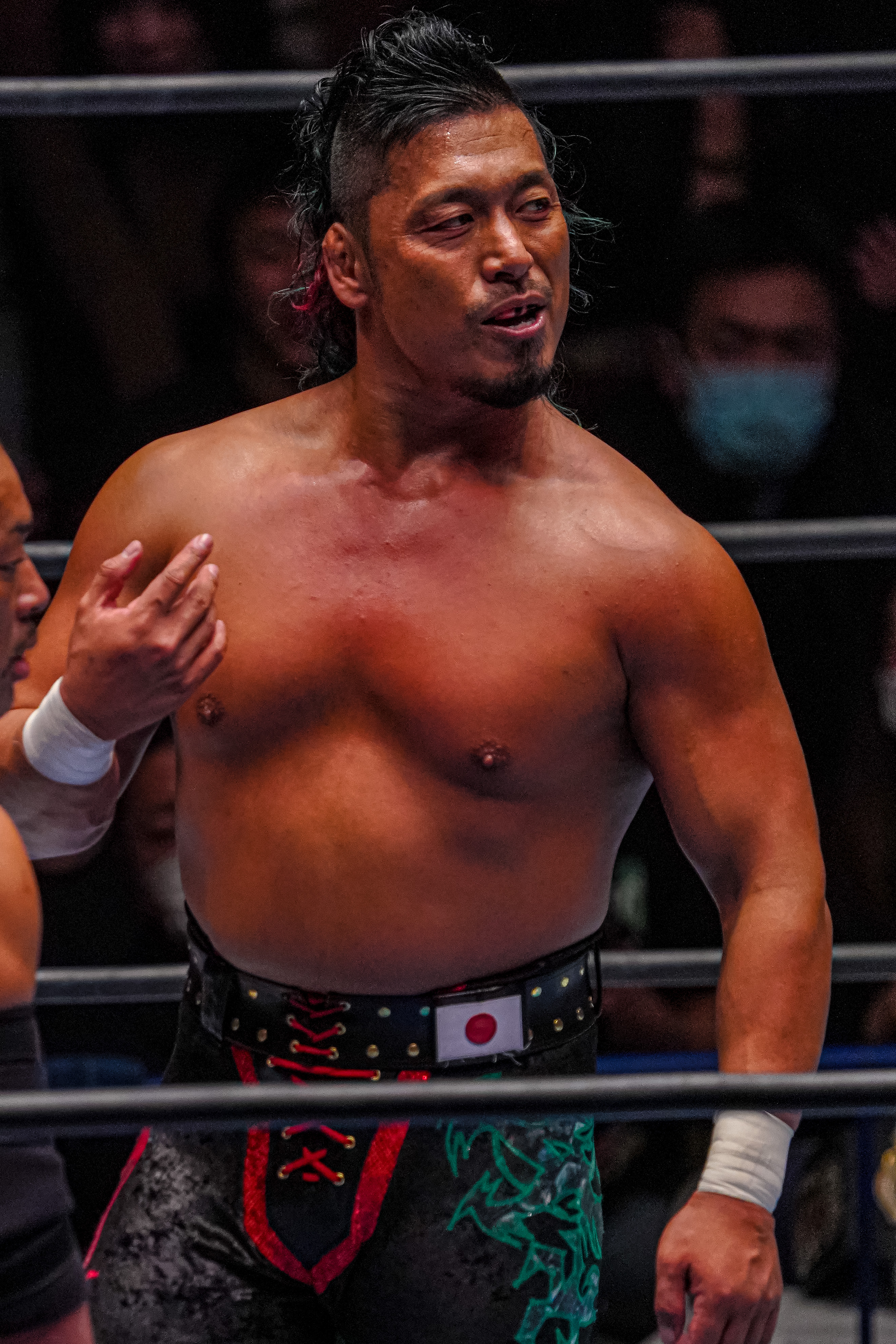
Shingo Takagi

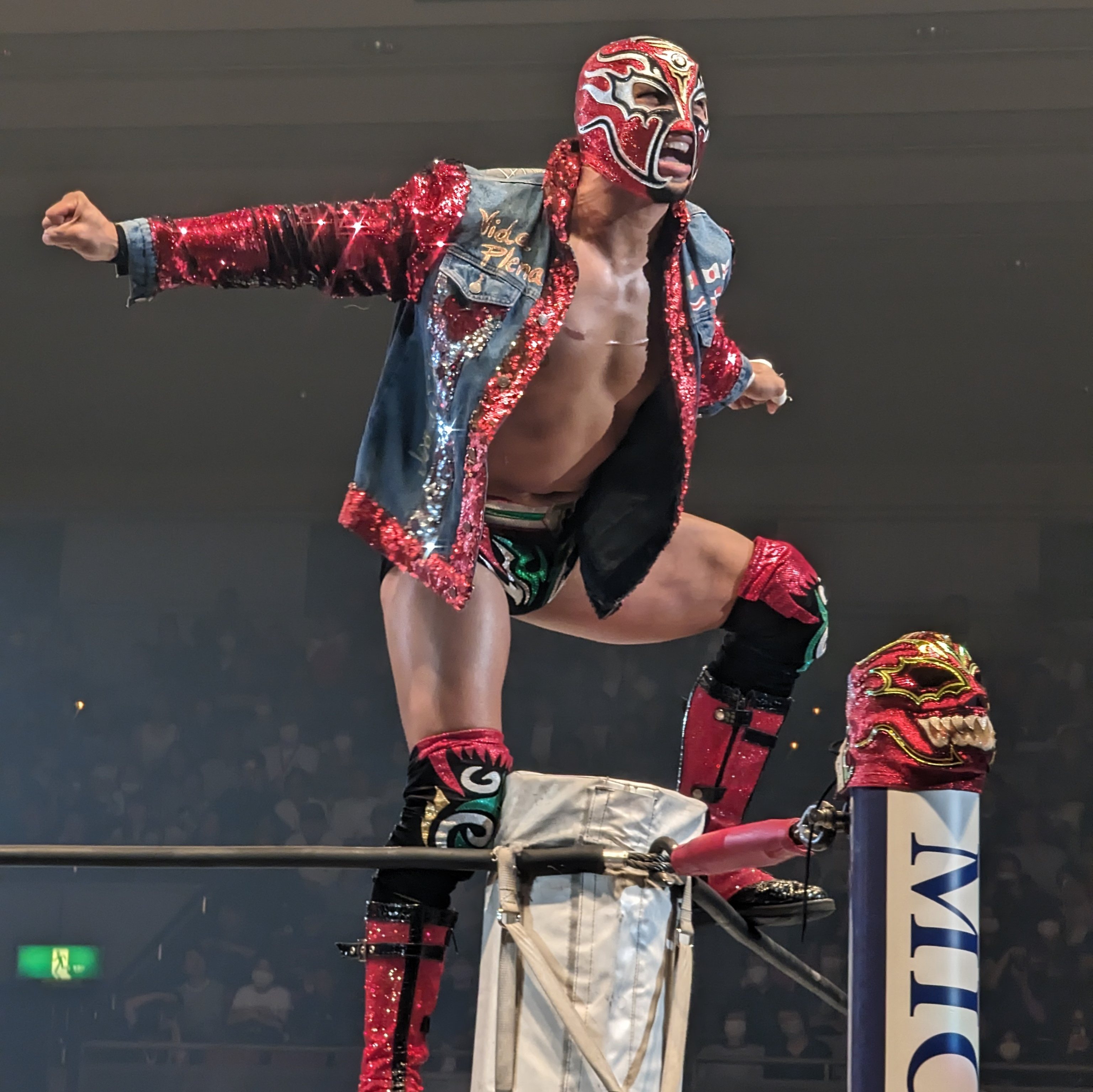
Titán

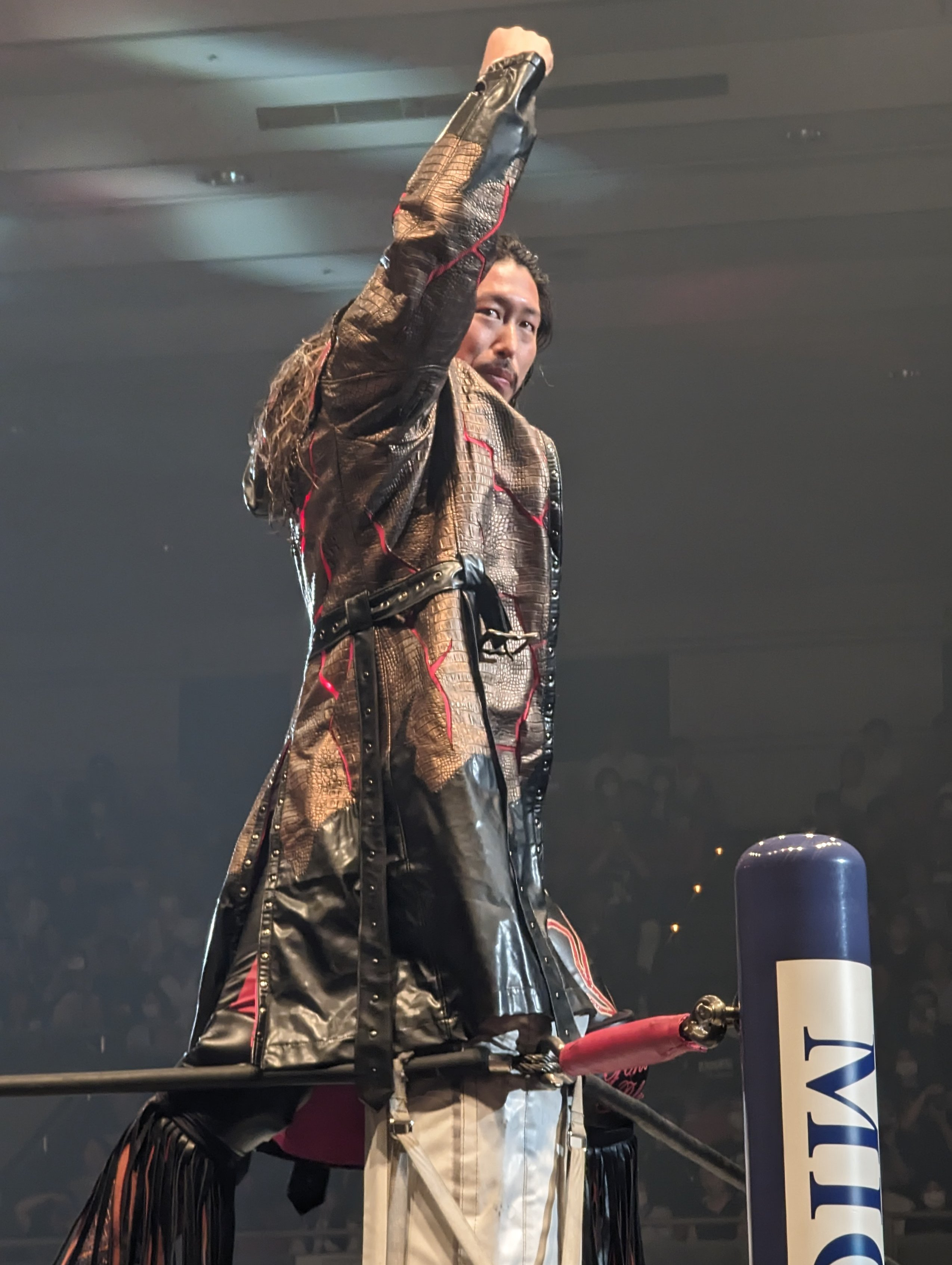
Yota Tsuji

Member	Tenure	Notes
Tetsuya Naito *(L)	November 21, 2015 – May 4, 2025	^{Note}
Bushi *	November 21, 2015 – May 4, 2025	^{Note}
Evil *	November 21, 2015 – July 11, 2020	^{Note}
Rush	November 21, 2015 – September 27, 2019	^{Note}
Sanada	April 10, 2016 – March 17, 2023	^{Note}
Jay Lethal	February 20, 2016 – August 20, 2016	^{Note}
Truth Martini	February 20, 2016	^{Note}
Hiromu Takahashi	December 10, 2016 – May 4, 2025	^{Note}
Shingo Takagi	October 8, 2018 – May 4, 2025	^{Note}
Titán	October 10, 2022 – May 4, 2025	^{Note}
Yota Tsuji	June 3, 2023 – May 4, 2025	^{Note}

=== Los Nuevos Ingobernables ===
This branch of the group primarily performed in Mexico with Consejo Mundial de Lucha Libre.

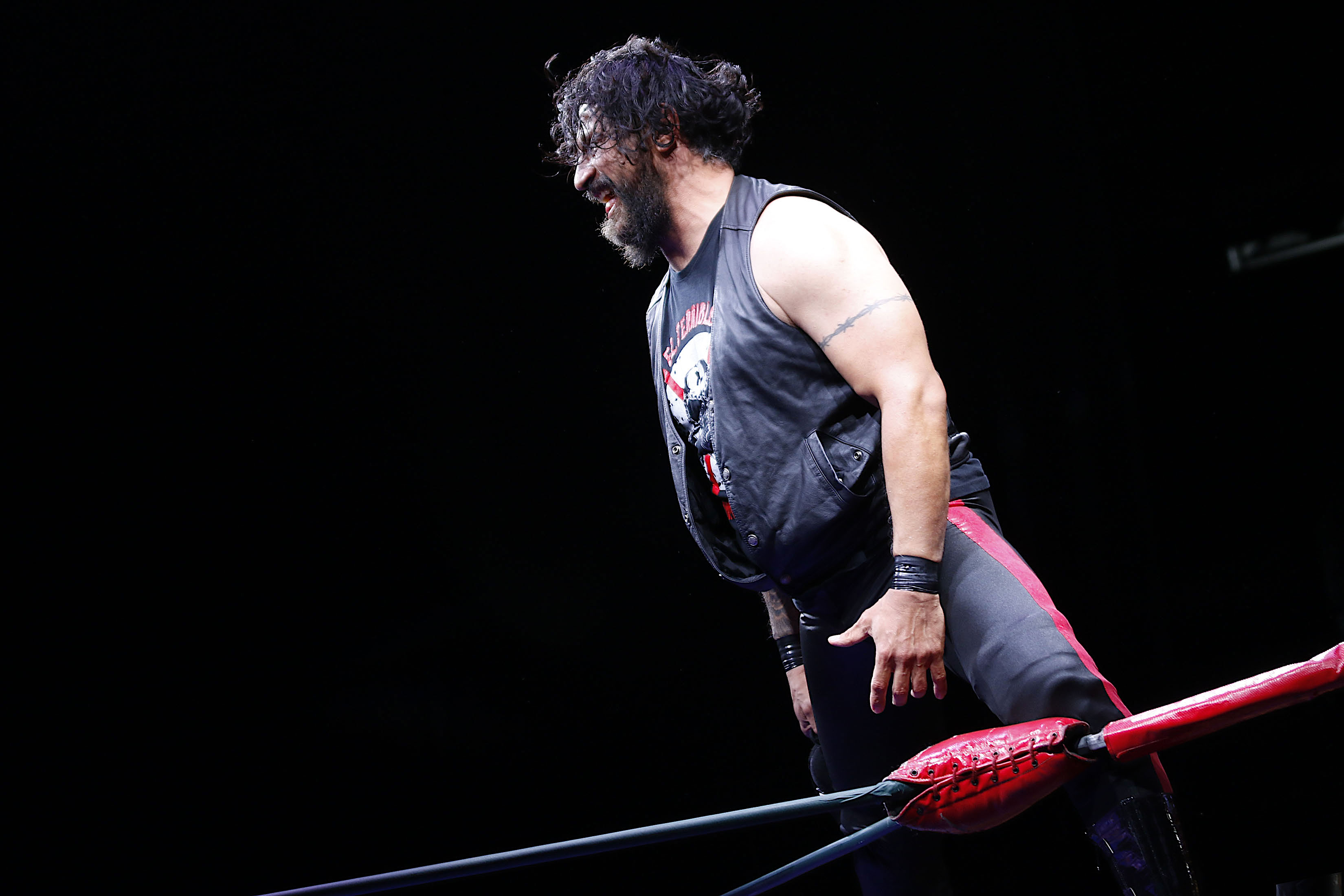
El Terrible

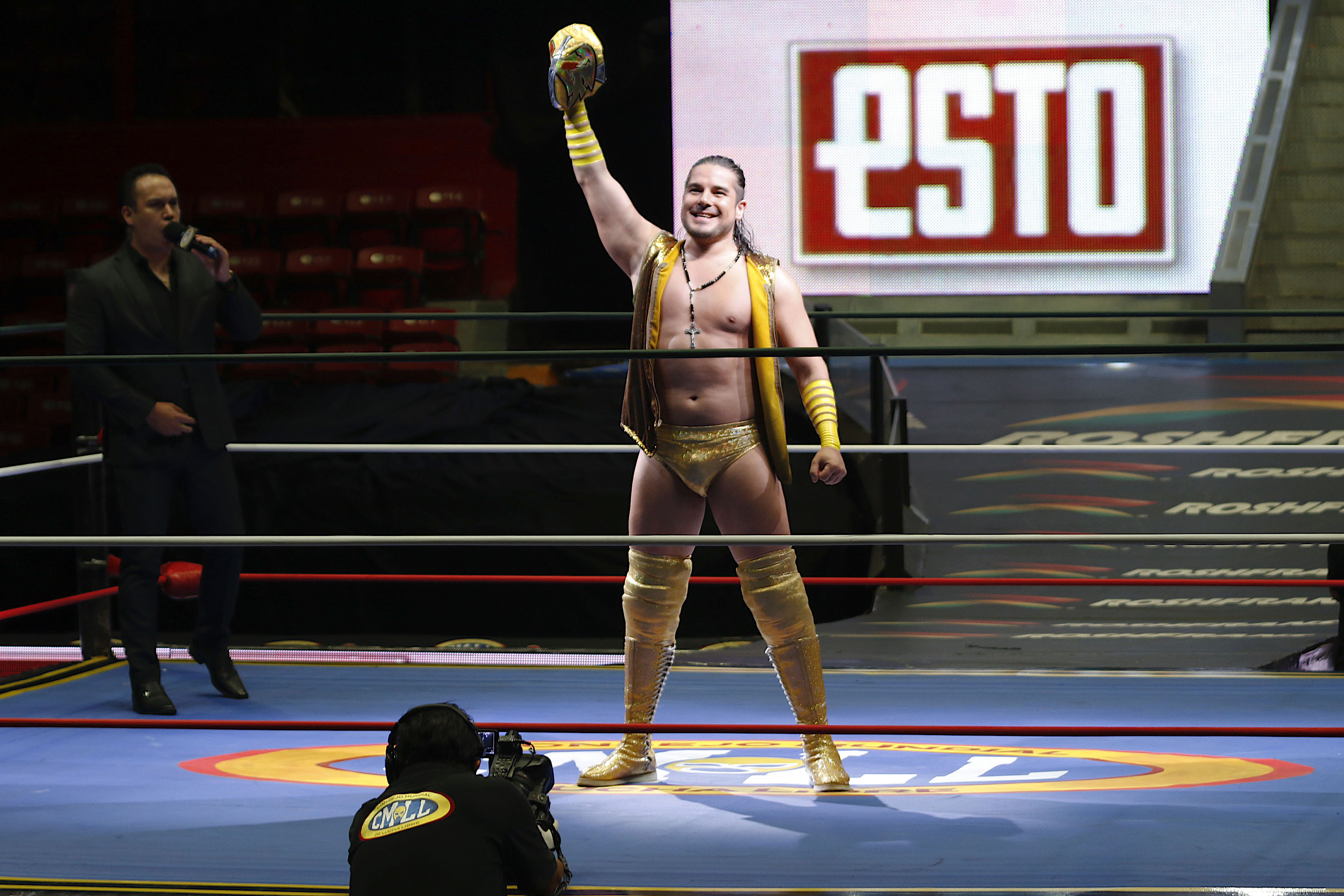
Ángel de Oro

Member	Tenure
El Terrible * (L)	March 24, 2021 – July 7, 2023
Ángel de Oro *	March 24, 2021 – August 18, 2023
Niebla Roja *	March 24, 2021 – August 18, 2023

== Championships and accomplishments ==
=== Los Ingobernables ===
- Consejo Mundial de Lucha Libre
  - CMLL World Light Heavyweight Championship (1 time) – La Máscara
  - CMLL World Tag Team Championship (2 times) – La Máscara and Rush, Rush and El Terrible
  - NWA World Historic Middleweight Championship (1 time) – La Sombra
  - NWA World Historic Welterweight Championship (1 time) – La Sombra
  - Mexican National Heavyweight Championship (1 time) – El Terrible
  - Leyenda Azul (2017) – Rush
  - Reyes del Aire (2015) – La Sombra
  - Torneo Nacional de Parejas Increíbles (2018) – Rush and El Terrible

=== La Facción Ingobernable ===
- The Crash Lucha Libre
  - The Crash Tag Team Championship (1 time) - Dragon Lee and Dralístico
- Ring of Honor
  - ROH World Championship (2 times) – Rush
  - ROH World Tag Team Championship (4 times) – Dragon Lee and Kenny King (2), Sammy Guevara and Rush (1), Sammy Guevara and The Beast Mortos (1)
  - ROH World Television Championship (2 times) – Dragon Lee

=== Los Nuevos Ingobernables ===
- Consejo Mundial de Lucha Libre
  - CMLL World Tag Team Championship (1 time, current) – Ángel de Oro and Niebla Roja
  - CMLL World Light Heavyweight Championship (1 time) – Niebla Roja
  - CMLL Mexican National Light Heavyweight Champion (1 time) – Ángel de Oro
  - Copa Junior VIP (2021) – Ángel de Oro

== Luchas de Apuestas record ==
Winner (wager)	Loser (wager)	Location	Event	Date	Notes
Rush (hair)	Negro Casas (hair)	Mexico City	El Juicio Final	August 1, 2014	
Atlantis (mask)	La Sombra (mask)	Mexico City	CMLL 82nd Anniversary Show	September 18, 2015	
Rush (hair)	Máximo Sexy (hair)	Mexico City	Homenaje a Dos Leyendas	March 18, 2016	
Diamante Azul (mask)	Pierroth (mask)	Mexico City	Homenaje a Dos Leyendas	March 17, 2017	
Pierroth (hair)	Vangellys (hair)	Mexico City	Universal Championship finals	July 14, 2017	
Los Hermano Chavez (hair) (Ángel de Oro and Niebla Roja)	Los Ingobernables (hair) (El Terrible and La Bestia del Ring)	Mexico City	Homenaje a Dos Leyendas	March 15, 2019	

== Notes ==
- Both CMLL and NJPW have referred to the members of Los Ingobernables de Japón as being part of Los Ingobernables when teaming with Rush in tag team matches.

== See also ==
- Los Ingobernables de Japón
- Los Mercenarios
- Consejo Mundial de Lucha Libre
- Professional wrestling in Mexico
- Lucha libre
