= Rush (wrestler) =

Mexican professional wrestler

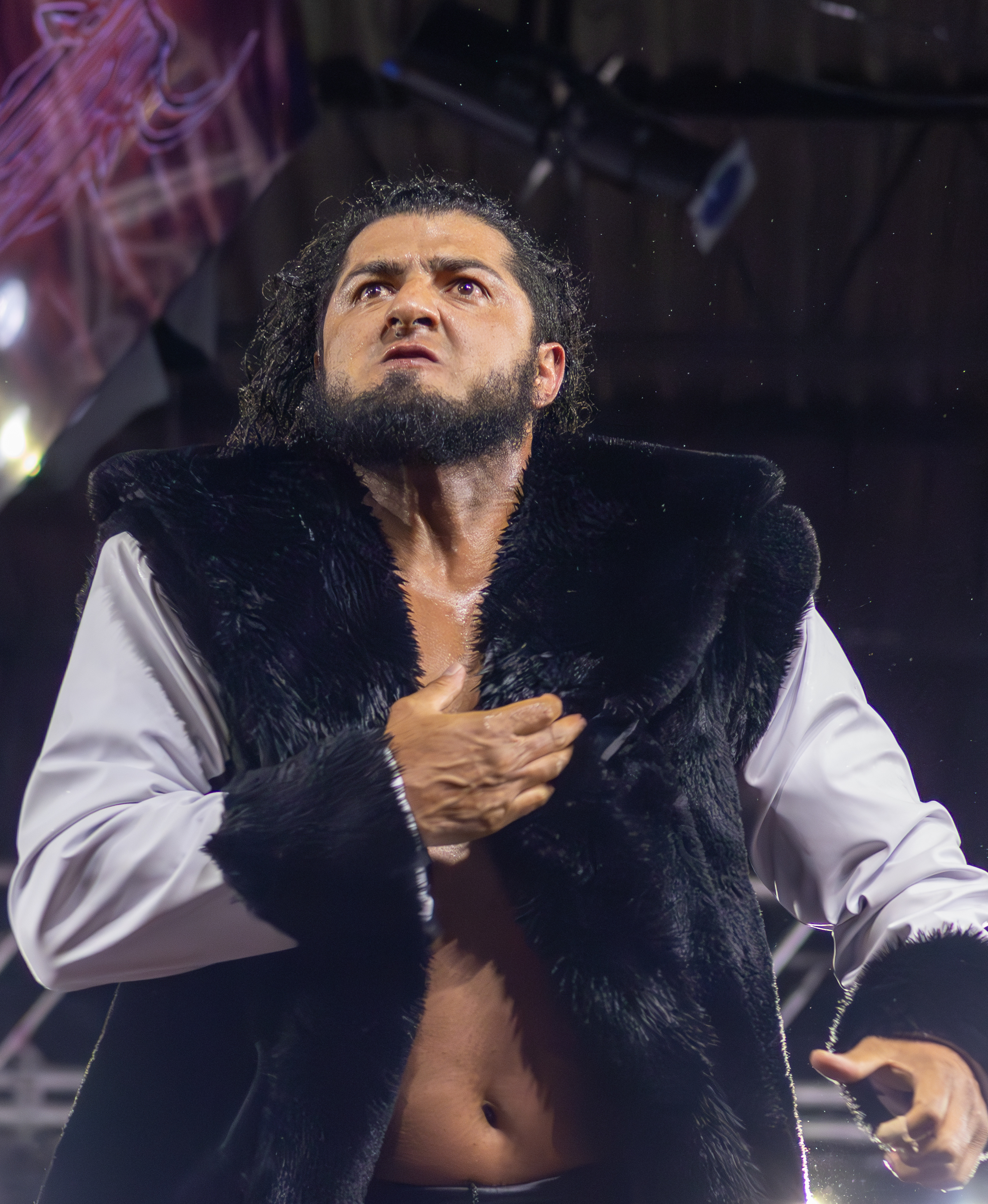
- Rush in August 2025

Personal information
- Born: William Arturo Muñoz González; September 29, 1988 (age 38) Tala, Jalisco, Mexico
- Relatives: La Bestia del Ring (father); Dragon Lee (brother); Dralístico (brother); Franco Columbo (uncle); Pitbull I (uncle); Pitbull II (uncle)

Professional wrestling career
- Ring name(s): Latino; Rouge; Rush; Rush El Toro Blanco; Rush Toro Blanco
- Billed height: 1.83 m (6 ft 0 in)
- Billed weight: 102 kg (225 lb)
- Billed from: Tala, Jalisco
- Trained by: Franco Columbo; Arturo Muñoz Sánchez; Los Pitbulls
- Debut: July 29, 2007

William Arturo Muñoz González (born September 29, 1988), better known by his ring name Rush (/ˈruːʃ/ ROOSH), is a Mexican professional wrestler. He is signed to American promotion All Elite Wrestling (AEW), where he is the leader of La Facción Ingobernable. He is best known for his time performing for the Mexican promotion Consejo Mundial de Lucha Libre (CMLL) as well as the U.S. based Ring of Honor (ROH). Muñoz's father, Arturo Muñoz, is also a professional wrestler, most recently known under the ring name La Bestia del Ring. William's younger brothers are also professional wrestlers, using the ring names Dralístico and Dragon Lee. While most professional wrestlers portray clear faces or heels in the ring, Rush portrays a character that straddles that divide; his in-ring actions are often chaotic or brawling, with tendencies to cheat, but he is still popular with fans.

Muñoz made his in-ring debut in 2007, working under the name Latino until he started working for CMLL in 2009, where he was given the name "Rush". He is a former CMLL World Light Heavyweight Champion, multiple time CMLL World Tag Team Champion, CMLL World Trios Champion and two-time Mexican National Trios Champion. Rush, along with La Sombra and La Máscara, created the group Los Ingobernables ("the unruly") and he was the only original member to remain part of the group in CMLL before departing the promotion in 2019. The success of Los Ingobernables led to the formation of the Los Ingobernables de Japón (LIJ) group in New Japan Pro-Wrestling (NJPW), of which Rush was a part-time member when he was touring Japan or when LIJ toured Mexico. Through CMLL's business partnerships, Rush additionally appeared for both NJPW and the U.S. based ROH, and his CMLL contract allowed him to work dates for other companies as well, most notably Major League Wrestling in the U.S., and The Crash Lucha Libre and International Wrestling Revolution Group in Mexico.

== Professional wrestling career ==
=== Independent circuit (2007–2009) ===
William Arturo Muñoz was initially trained for his professional wrestling career by his father Arturo Muñoz Sánchez and his uncles, who worked under the ring names Pit Bull I and Pit Bull II. He made his in-ring debut on July 29, 2007.

Muñoz made his debut for International Wrestling Revolution Group (IWRG) in October 2008, performing under the ring name Latino. He would wrestle midcard matches for IWRG for eight months, before making his final appearance on June 7, 2009.

=== Consejo Mundial de Lucha Libre (2009–2019) ===
==== Early years (2009–2011) ====
During the summer of 2009, Muñoz was signed by one of Mexico's top promotions, Consejo Mundial de Lucha Libre (CMLL), and given the new ring name Rouge, which was soon afterwards tweaked to its current form, Rush. He would make his debut for the promotion on August 9, teaming with Mictlán and Stuka Jr. to defeat Hooligan, Loco Max and Pólvora in a six-man tag team match. Rush would spend his first year in the promotion wrestling tag team and six-man tag team matches, often teaming with Máximo, Mictlán, Metro and Toscano. Despite being booked as a técnico ("Face", or those that portray the good guys), Rush would often show rudo ("heel" or those that portray the bad guys) tendencies during his matches. During the summer of 2010, Rush entered a feud with Loco Max, which culminated on August 15 in a Hair vs. Hair Lucha de Apuestas match, where Rush was victorious, thus forcing his adversary to have his hair shaved off.

On November 25, Rush won CMLL's Bodybuilding Contest in the advanced category. With his win, Rush gained the new nickname "Mr. CMLL". On January 2, 2011, Rush, Ángel de Oro and Diamante defeated Metal Blanco, Palacio Negro and El Sagrado in the finals of a two-week-long tournament to become the number one contenders to the Mexican National Trios Championship. On January 9, the trio defeated Delta, Metro and Stuka Jr. to become the new champions.

On February 15, Rush teamed with Máscara Dorada and La Sombra against the team of Averno, Dragón Rojo Jr. and Ephesto and managed to win the match for his team by pinning the CMLL World Light Heavyweight Champion Ephesto, afterwards challenging him to a match for the title. The title match took place on February 22 and saw Rush defeat Ephesto to become the new CMLL World Light Heavyweight Champion. In response to the backlash over his sudden push, Rush acknowledged his many detractors by posting a list of the various moves he could do in the ring, while also promoting his youth, strength and physique. After successfully defending the CMLL World Light Heavyweight Championship against Rey Bucanero and Psicosis, Rush was granted a shot at the CMLL World Heavyweight Championship, held by Último Guerrero. The title match took place on June 12 and saw Guerrero retain his title two falls to one. Afterwards, Rush began feuding with Japanese wrestler Yoshihashi, which led to the two agreeing to face each other in a Hair vs. Hair Lucha de Apuestas. On August 1, Rush defeated Yoshihashi two falls to one to win his second Hair vs. Hair match.

On August 23, 2012, Rush made his third successful defense of the CMLL World Light Heavyweight Championship by defeating Mr. Águila. On September 20, Rush, Ángel de Oro and Diamante lost the Mexican National Trios Championship to Los Invasores (Olímpico, Psicosis and Volador Jr.).

==== El Bufete del Amor (2011–2013) ====
On November 13, Rush successfully defended the CMLL World Light Heavyweight Championship against El Terrible. The following month, Rush teamed up with Máximo and the returning Marco Corleone to form La Tercia Sensación, later renamed El Bufete del Amor.

On December 25, Rush and El Terrible survived a torneo cibernetico match used to determine the two competitors in a match for the vacant CMLL World Heavyweight Championship. On January 1, 2012, El Terrible defeated Rush two falls to one to win the CMLL World Heavyweight Championship. On January 21 and 22, Rush took part in the CMLL and New Japan Pro-Wrestling (NJPW) co-produced Fantastica Mania 2012 events in Tokyo, teaming with Máscara Dorada losing to the team of Hirooki Goto and Kushida on the first night and losing to Goto in a singles match on the second night. On February 19, El Bufete del Amor defeated Los Hijos del Averno (Averno, Ephesto and Mephisto) to win the CMLL World Trios Championship. Also in February, Rush teamed with El Terrible in the National Parejas Increibles tournament, where teams were made up of rivals. Rush and El Terrible eventually made it to the finals of the tournament on March 2, 2012, at Homenaje a Dos Leyendas, where they were defeated by the team of Atlantis and Mr. Niebla. Two days later, Rush successfully defended the CMLL World Light Heavyweight Championship against El Terrible, the reigning CMLL World Heavyweight Champion.

In May, Rush started feuding with New Japan Pro-Wrestling representative Yujiro Takahashi, which built to a match on June 5, where Rush successfully defended the CMLL World Light Heavyweight Championship against Takahashi. On July 8, New Japan Pro-Wrestling announced Rush as a participant in the 2012 G1 Climax tournament. Rush returned to the promotion on July 29 at Last Rebellion, where he, Karl Anderson, MVP and Shelton Benjamin defeated Suzuki-gun (Minoru Suzuki, Lance Archer, Taichi and Taka Michinoku) in an eight-man tag team match. Rush opened his G1 Climax tournament on August 1 with a win over Hirooki Goto, avenging his loss from Fantastica Mania. After three wins, one over IWGP Heavyweight Championship contender Tetsuya Naito, and five losses, Rush was eliminated from the tournament on August 11, eventually finishing last in his block. Upon Rush's return to CMLL, he continued his rivalry with El Terrible going into the 2012 Universal Championship tournament, where he made it to the finals of his block, before losing to El Terrible, after which he was attacked by both El Terrible and his stablemate Rey Bucanero. On September 9, Rush defeated Bucanero in a steel cage match to retain the CMLL World Light Heavyweight Championship. Rush's rivalry with El Terrible culminated five days later in the main event of CMLL's 79th Anniversary Show, where Rush was victorious in a Hair vs. Hair Lucha de Apuestas, forcing his rival to have his head shaved.

In late 2012 Rush and Diamante Azul participated in NJPW's 2012 World Tag League under the name CMLL Asesino (CMLL Assassins). Rush and Diamante ended the tournament on November 28, 2012, with just four points after victories over Tencozy (Hiroyoshi Tenzan and Satoshi Kojima) and Complete Players (Masato Tanaka and Yujiro Takahashi), finishing in the last place in Group B, after losses to the teams of Chaos (Takashi Iizuka and Toru Yano), K.E.S. (Lance Archer and Davey Boy Smith Jr.), Muscle Orchestra (Manabu Nakanishi and Strong Man), and finally Black Dynamite (MVP and Shelton Benjamin). Rush scored both of his team's pinfall wins and was not pinned or submitted in any of the losses. (Note: World Tag League 2012 tournament results: "NJPW 40ｔｈ anniversary Tour World Tag League 2012". New Japan Pro-Wrestling (in Japanese). Archived from the original on December 2, 2012.; "NJPW 40ｔｈ anniversary Tour World Tag League 2012". New Japan Pro-Wrestling (in Japanese). Archived from the original on November 29, 2012.; "NJPW 40ｔｈ anniversary Tour World Tag League 2012". New Japan Pro-Wrestling (in Japanese). Archived from the original on November 30, 2012.; "NJPW 40ｔｈ anniversary Tour World Tag League 2012". New Japan Pro-Wrestling (in Japanese). Archived from the original on December 5, 2012.; Dark Angelita (November 21, 2012). "NJPW: Resultados "World Tag League 2012" – Día 2 – Triunfan Rush y Diamante Azul" [NJPW: Results "World Tag League 2012"]. Súper Luchas (in Spanish).; Dark Angelita (November 23, 2012). "NJPW: Resultados "World Tag League 2012" – Día 3 – Rush y Diamante Azul sufren su primera derrota" [NJPW: Results "World Tag League 2012" – day 3 – Rush and Diamante Azul suffer their first defeat]. Súper Luchas (in Spanish).; Dark Angelita (November 24, 2012). "NJPW: Resultados "World Tag League 2012" – Día 4 – Rush y Diamante Azul se recuperan" [NJPW: Results "World Tag League 2012" – day 4 – Rush and Diamante Azul recover]. Súper Luchas (in Spanish).; Dark Angelita (November 25, 2012). "NJPW: Resultados "World Tag League 2012" – Día 5 – Rush y Diamante tropiezan por segunda ocasión" [NJPW: Results "World Tag League 2012" – day 5 – Rush and Diamante Azul stumble for the second time]. Súper Luchas (in Spanish).; Dark Angelita (November 27, 2012). "NJPW: Resultados "World Tag League 2012" – Día 6 – Tercera derrota del equipo del CMLL" [NJPW: Results "World Tag League 2012" – day 6 – Third loss for team CMLL]. Súper Luchas (in Spanish).; Dark Angelita (November 28, 2012). "NJPW: Resultados "World Tag League 2012" – Día 7 – Cuarta derrota de Rush y Diamante Azul" [NJPW: Results "World Tag League 2012" – day 5 – fourth loss for Rush and Diamante Azul]. Súper Luchas (in Spanish).) Rush and Azul finished their tour with a pay-per-view on December 2, losing to Jado and Yoshi-Hashi in a tag team match, with Azul once again being the one pinned for the win. On January 15, 2013, Rush gave up the CMLL World Light Heavyweight Championship to get another shot at El Terrible's CMLL World Heavyweight Championship. On January 18, Rush returned to Japan to take part in the three-day Fantastica Mania 2013 event. During the first night, he defeated former rival Yoshi-Hashi in a singles match. The following night, Rush was pinned for the win by Rey Escorpión in a six-man tag team match, where he, Hiroshi Tanahashi and La Máscara faced Escorpión, Kazuchika Okada and Volador Jr. During the third and final night, Rush defeated Escorpión in a singles match.

Back in Mexico on January 22, Rush failed in his CMLL World Heavyweight Championship challenge against El Terrible, after being struck with a kick to the groin. In March, Rush and El Terrible teamed up for the 2013 Torneo Nacional de Parejas Increibles like they had for the 2012 tournament, but the team lost in the first round to Dragón Rojo Jr. and Niebla Roja. Two weeks later they were on opposite sides of a six-man tag team match at the 2013 Homenaje a Dos Leyendas show, where Rush, Rayo de Jalisco Jr. and Shocker defeated El Terrible, Mr. Niebla and Universo 2000 by disqualification. In May, Rush, Marco Corleone and Máximo were stripped of the CMLL World Trios Championship, when Corleone was sidelined with a knee injury. On June 9, Rush earned a big win over NJPW representative Shinsuke Nakamura in a main event singles match. On June 30, Rush won the Mexican National Trios Championship for the second time, when he, La Máscara and Titán defeated Los Invasores (Kráneo, Mr. Águila and Psicosis) for the title. On August 23, Rush entered the 2013 Universal Championship tournament, defeating El Terrible, La Máscara and Rey Escorpión to win his block and advance to the finals, to be held two weeks later. On September 6, Rush was defeated in the finals of the tournament by NJPW representative Tanahashi.

==== "The most hated wrestler in CMLL" (2013–2014) ====
In mid-2013, Rush once again began teasing a possible rudo turn as the crowd reaction to him grew more and more negative. Despite officially being a técnico, Rush was now referred to as "the most hated wrestler in CMLL". On September 13 at CMLL's 80th Anniversary Show, Rush pinned Negro Casas to win a six-man tag team match, while holding the ring ropes, a move commonly associated with rudos. On October 8, Rush and La Máscara defeated Atlantis and La Sombra in the finals of a tournament to become the number one contenders to the CMLL World Tag Team Championship. On October 18, Rush and La Máscara were awarded the CMLL World Tag Team Championship, when Rey Bucanero, one half of the previous champions, was unable to defend the title due to an injury. Rush then began feuding with one half of the previous champions, NJPW representative Tama Tonga. After losing to Tonga in a singles match on November 1, Rush and La Máscara successfully defended the CMLL World Tag Team Championship against Tonga and El Terrible on November 8, after Rush faked taking a low blow from Tonga.

On November 12, 2013, Rush received another shot at the CMLL World Heavyweight Championship, but once again failed in his attempt to dethrone longtime rival El Terrible. Rush then resumed his rivalry with Negro Casas, pinning him following a low blow in a six-man tag team match on November 15, after which he accepted Casas' challenge for a Hair vs. Hair match between the two. In January 2014, Rush returned to Japan to take part in the five-day Fantastica Mania 2014 tour. For the entire tour, Rush feuded with Shinsuke Nakamura, culminating in a singles rematch between the two at the fourth event on January 18, where Nakamura was victorious. Back in CMLL, Rush started another rivalry with Shocker, a longtime técnico, who turned rudo just so he could go up against Rush. On February 18, Rush, La Máscara and Titán lost the Mexican National Trios Championship to La Peste Negra (El Felino, Mr. Niebla and Negro Casas). Rush, Casas and Shocker had agreed to a three-way Lucha de Apuestas, but Casas was forced to pull out of the match, set for March 21, declaring that he would face the winner at a later date. On March 21 at Homenaje a Dos Leyendas, Rush defeated Shocker for his fourth Lucha de Apuestas win.

==== Los Ingobernables (2014–2019) ====
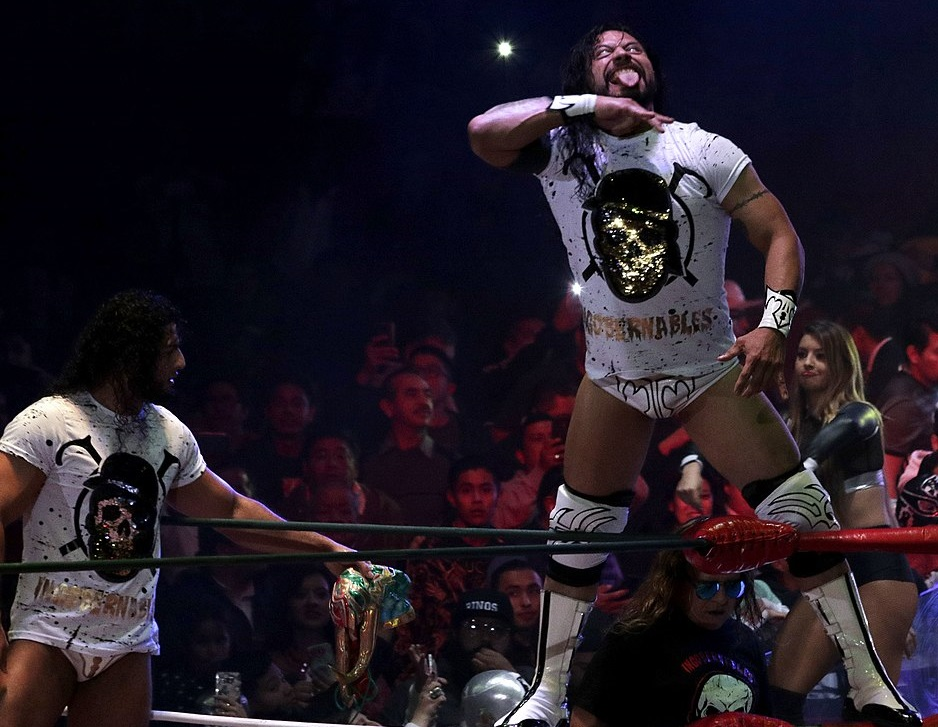
Rush and El Terrible in November 2018

The following month, Rush formed a new partnership with La Sombra. Now referred to as the two most hated men in CMLL's recent history, the two effectively became rudos, though they refused to acknowledge themselves as such, instead calling themselves "técnicos diferentes". The two were eventually also joined by La Máscara, who adopted their técnico diferente attitude, forming a stable originally called Los Indeseables ("The Undesirables"), but later renamed Los Ingobernables ("The Ungovernables"). On June 13, Rush and La Máscara lost the CMLL World Tag Team Championship to Negro Casas and Shocker. On August 1 at El Juicio Final, Rush defeated Negro Casas for his fifth Lucha de Apuestas win. Rush announced Casas' hair as the last hair he wanted to take, saying that he now wanted to wage his hair against masks. In November, Rush was sidelined from in-ring action, after breaking two bones in his ankle during a match. He made his return from the injury on February 27, 2015.

In May, it was reported that Muñoz was in legal trouble after allegedly punching an Arena México security guard, who had denied his wife entry to the arena. The security guard reportedly received a third degree cervical sprain, a concussion and a possible fractured vertebra in the incident, which took place on April 7. Afterwards, CMLL reportedly tried to keep the security guard from releasing the story to the media, while pulling Muñoz from all Mexico City events for three weeks. Following the story going public, Muñoz was also pulled from that week's CMLL events. On July 21, Rush and La Sombra were involved in an incident in Guadalajara, where the two attacked fans who were throwing beers at them. The following day, Jalisco's Boxing and Wrestling Commission suspended the two from wrestling in the state for three months. While the commission only suspended them from wrestling in Jalisco, CMLL decided to pull both Rush and La Sombra from their Super Viernes show three days later. CMLL did not offer an official explanation for the change. In early November, Rush and La Sombra began having issues with each other, which led to a singles match between the two on November 13, where Rush was victorious. After the match, the two founding members of Los Ingobernables made peace with each other. It later turned out that this was La Sombra's final CMLL match as on November 19 it was announced that he had signed with WWE. On March 18, 2016, at Homenaje a Dos Leyendas, Rush won his sixth Lucha de Apuestas, when he defeated Máximo Sexy with help from Pierroth. On May 13, Rush and Pierroth, now acknowledged as his real-life father, turned on La Máscara. Rush and La Máscara eventually reconciled the following September. On November 18, Rush returned to CMLL's Japanese partner New Japan Pro-Wrestling as the surprise tag team partner of Los Ingobernables de Japón's Tetsuya Naito in the 2016 World Tag League. Rush and Naito finished the tournament on December 7 with a record of four wins and three losses, failing to advance to the finals due to losing to block winners Tama Tonga and Tanga Loa in their final round-robin match. On December 22, 2017, Rush won the 2017 Leyenda Azul tournament.

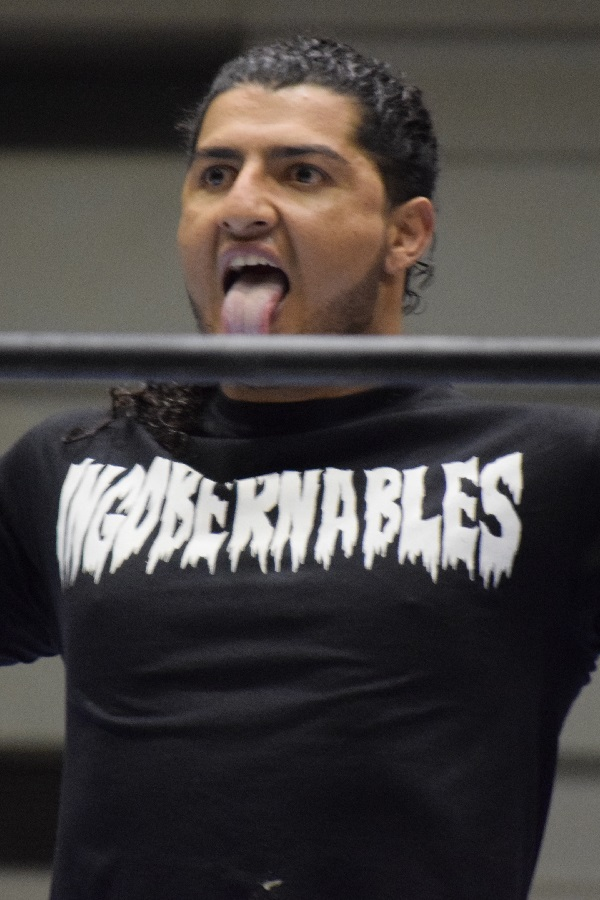
Rush at Fantastica Mania 2017.

In February 2018, Rush and former rival El Terrible were teamed up for the 2018 Torneo Nacional de Parejas Increíbles, defeating the teams of Forastero/Stuka Jr., Atlantis/Mr. Niebla, Carístico/Euforia and finally Volador Jr. and Último Guerrero to win the tournament. After the victory El Terrible became an official member of Los Ingobernables. After Volador Jr. and Flyer won the 2018 Gran Alternativa, they were attacked by Los Ingobernables. Moments later Volador Jr,'s uncle L.A. Park and cousin El Hijo de L.A. Park made their surprise return to CMLL by running to the ring and chasing off Los Ingobernables, bringing the rivalry between Rush and L.A. Park to the CMLL ring for the first time. Over the summer Los Ingobernables and "La Familia Real ("The Royal Family"; L.A. Park, Volador Jr., Flyer and El Hijo de L.A. Park) main evented many Friday night shows in CMLL. The main focus was building a rivalry between Rush and L.A. Park, believed to be leading to a Lucha de Apuestas, at the CMLL 85th Anniversary Show. As part of the storyline Rush and El Terrible defeat Volador Jr. and Valiente to win the CMLL World Tag Team Championship on July 13, 2018. the feud between Rush and L.A. Park was not confined to CMLL, with Rush and Dragon Lee losing to L.A. Park and El Hijo de L.A. Park in the main event of IWRG's 2018 Festival de las Máscaras show, In the late summer, CMLL shifted focus from Rush vs. Parka to Rush and Bárbaro Cavernario against Volador Jr. and Matt Taven as the main event of the 85th Anniversary Show. In the main event of the anniversary show Rush and Cavernario won a tag team lucha de apuestas, forcing Volador Jr. and Taven to have their hair shaved off for the first time in their careers. On November 18, 2018, Diamante Azul and Valiente defeated Los Ingobernables, taking the CMLL World Tag Team Championship from them in the process. While the feud between Rush and L.A. Park was downplayed by CMLL it continued on the independent circuit, including the main event of IWRG's Triangular en Jaula ("triangle in a cage") show, which saw Rush defeat L.A. Park and Penta 0M in a steel cage match.

In January 2019, Rush signed a contract with Ring of Honor, becoming a regular wrestler of their roster. On September 27, 2019, Rush wrestled on ROH's Death Before Dishonor event and not at the CMLL 86th Anniversary Show. That same day, he announced on his Twitter he would become independent, leaving CMLL. Shortly afterwards CMLL announced that they had fired both Muñoz and his brother Dragon Lee for not following guidelines set by the promotion's programming department.

=== Major League Wrestling (2018–2019) ===
On November 8, 2018, Rush made his debut for the US-based Major League Wrestling (MLW) as he defeated Sammy Guevara in a match MLW taped for their weekly television show MLW Fusion. After the initial appearance MLW announced that 2019 would be "the year of El Toro Blanco", revealing that they have plans for him in 2019. He returned to MLW on December 13 and 14 for their television tapings, during which he interacted with long time rival L.A. Park who is also a MLW regular, leading to MLW announcing that Rush and L.A. Park would face off on April 4, as part of MLW's WrestleMania weekend show. However, it was later announced that Rush had been pulled from the match due to signing with Ring of Honor in the United States. His final match for MLW was a match pitting him against Shane Strickland. The match aired on the January 18, 2019 episode of MLW Fusion, where Rush was the winner of the contest. Rush left the promotion when he signed an exclusive contract with Ring of Honor.

=== Ring of Honor (2018–2021) ===
Through CMLL's partnership with the US-based Ring of Honor (ROH) Rush made his debut for ROH on December 15, 2018, defeating T. K. O'Ryan in his first match for the group. After the match, he was attacked by the rest of The Kingdom (Matt Taven and Vinny Marseglia) building on Rush and Taven's feud in Mexico. On January 15, 2019, it was announced that Rush had signed an exclusive contract with Ring of Honor. Rush defeated Vinny Marseglia in first ROH match under full contract on February 9, 2019. The following month Rush made his ROH pay-per-view (PPV) debut, as he defeated Bandido as part of the ROH 17th Anniversary Show.

On September 27, 2019, at the Death Before Dishonor XVII PPV, Rush won the ROH World Championship from Matt Taven. At Final Battle, he lost the championship to PCO.

On December 15 at Final Battle Fallout, Rush introduced the ROH branch of Los Ingobernables, known as La Facción Ingobernable (LFI), including himself, Dragon Lee, Kenny King, and Amy Rose. La Facción Ingobernable's first match as a team saw them defeat Villain Enterprises (Marty Scurll, Brody King, and PCO). At "Gateway to Honor", held on February 29, 2020, Rush regained the ROH World Heavyweight Championship in a match against PCO and Mark Haskins. During the match Nick Aldis attacked PCO during the match, allowing Rush to get the pin fall.

ROH halted operations in March 2020 due to the COVID-19 pandemic, resuming that August. Rush would then make his return on December 10 of that year, defending the ROH World Title against Brody King at Final Battle, where his father La Bestia Del Ring would attack King, assisting Rush in retaining the title, and subsequently joining his sons in LFI. In September 2021 Rush Revealed that his contract is scheduled to expire in January 2022. On October 27, 2021, Rush, along with the rest of the Ring of Honor roster and All personnel would be released from their contracts and would not be renewed.

=== Lucha Libre AAA Worldwide (2019–2023) ===
On December 1, 2019, at Triplemanía Regia, Rush made his AAA debut, defeating Pagano and L.A. Park in a three-way match. On December 14 at Guerra de Titanes, the now-renamed "Rush El Toro Blanco" teamed with Blue Demon Jr. and Rey Escorpión to defeat Psycho Clown, Dr. Wagner Jr., and Drago. After the match, it was announced that Rush, La Bestia del Ring, Killer Kross, L.A. Park and Konnan were forming a new group called La Facción Ingobernable (based on Rush's Los Ingobernables group from CMLL).

In June 2023, Rush announced his departure from AAA.

=== All Elite Wrestling / Return to ROH (2022–present) ===
Rush in June 2024

On May 29, 2022, during the promotion's Double or Nothing pay-per-view, Rush was revealed as a new member of All Elite Wrestling (AEW), aligning with his former partner Andrade El Idolo as part of La Facción Ingobernable (LFI). On the June 24, 2022 episode of AEW Rampage, Rush made his televised debut in AEW, helping El Idolo defeat Rey Fenix. Rush wrestled his first match for AEW, on the June 29 episode of Rampage competing in the Royal Rampage Battle Royal, but failed to win. On the July 6 edition of Dynamite, Rush made his singles debut defeating Fenix's brother Penta Oscuro. On the July 27 at Fight for the Fallen, Rush faced Jon Moxley in an AEW Interim World Championship eliminator match, but lost. After AEW owner Tony Khan purchased Ring of Honor, Rush, who had been appearing for AEW, made his return to Ring of Honor on July 23, defeating his brother Dragon Lee at Death Before Dishonor. The feud between the duos of El Idolo and Rush and Oscuro and Fenix ended when Rush and El Idolo defeated The Lucha Brothers in a tornado tag team match, on the August 10 episode of Dynamite. The following week, Rush, El Idolo and Dragon Lee, competed in the first round of the tournament to crown the inaugural AEW World Trios Champions, but were defeated in the first round by The Elite, after the loss Rush and El Idolo attacked and unmasked Lee, ending their alliance with him. On September 4 at All Out, Rush and El Idolo competed in the Casino Ladder match, but both men failed to win. On September 30, 2022, Rush was signed to a full-time contract with AEW. On the October 21 edition of Rampage, Rush competed in a three-way match for the AEW All-Atlantic Championship involving 10 and champion Orange Cassidy. The match ended with Cassidy retaining the championship. In November, Rush was announced as a participant in the AEW World Championship Eliminator Tournament, but was defeated in the first round by Bandido. In the same month, Rush recruited Preston Vance to join LFI.

On March 31, 2023 at Supercard of Honor, Rush and Dralístico took part in a "Reach for the Sky" ladder match for the vacant ROH World Tag Team Championship, which was won by the Lucha Brothers. On July 24, 2023, Rush announced that he re-signed with AEW. On November 18 at Full Gear, Rush with his stablemate and brother Dralístico competed in a four-way tag team ladder match for the AEW World Tag Team Championship, but failed to win. On November 22, Rush was announced as a participant in the very first Continental Classic, where he was placed in the Gold block. Rush finished with a total of 6 points and failed to advance to the semi-finals.

On January 4, 2024, Rush revealed he had suffered a torn hamstring during the Continental Classic and would be out of action. Rush returned from injury on the April 27 episode of AEW Collision, defeating Martin Stone in a squash match. In the summer, Rush briefly joined the Don Callis Family, but would quickly rejoin LFI with Dralístico and newest member The Beast Mortos at the Collision edition of Grand Slam on September 28. On August 29, 2025 at Death Before Dishonor, Rush teamed with newest LFI member Sammy Guevara to defeat The Outrunners (Turbo Floyd and Truth Magnum) to win the vacant ROH World Tag Team Championships. On November 28, Rush and Guevara were forced to vacate their titles due to Rush suffering a knee injury, ending their reign at 91 days.

== Professional wrestling persona ==
Over the years William Muñoz has cultivated the Rush persona into one of the top level wrestlers in Mexico, as he is often involved in main event matches when he wrestles for CMLL or on the Mexican independent circuit. Starting out he was simply a "tecnico", a generic good guy who showed little personality, but over time developed a more laid-back, arrogant "rudo" character that was portrayed by all members of Los Ingobernables, the gimmick was so successful that it also spawned Los Ingobernables de Japón, voted the "best gimmick" in the annual Wrestling Observer awards for 2017. Rush's "Tranquilo" ("Relax") persona is often expressed in a lack of interest in most opponents as if they are not worth his time. This is often expressed by Rush, and other members of Los Ingobernables engaging in a game of invisible futbol during matches to mock their opponents. His catchphrase "No pasa Nada!", or "Nothing happened", basically dismisses any opponent as not being worth his time. In April 2016, Dave Meltzer of the Wrestling Observer Newsletter wrote that the Los Ingobernables concept of having Rush, once a face (hero) rejected by Arena México crowds, turn heel (villain) and "embrace the negative", had made him a "far more effective headliner".

While Rush remains "Tranquilo" against most opponents, his explosive temper causes him to brawl with certain rivals such as L.A. Park or Volador Jr., at times leading to disqualifications when Rush or his teammates ignore the rules. Over the years Rush has earned the nickname "Mr. CMLL", being one of CMLL's most popular stars in recent years, despite acting like a rudo during matches. He will often refer to himself as "El Toro Blanco" (Spanish for "The White Bull"), a name his father wrestled under many years ago.

Rush's style of wrestling focuses on high-impact moves, such as a running corner dropkick to a seated opponent, that often looks like he makes full impact with the opponent. As part of his mind games he will often fake the corner drop kick early in the match, berate his opponent and then land dropkick later in the match. For years Rush's main finishing move was La Lanza ("The Spear"), a diving double foot stomp. In recent years he has changed his finishing move to the Martillo Negro ("Black Hammer"), a double underhook piledriver that is also referred to as the "Rush Driver" outside of Mexico and a corner shotgun dropkick which he refers to as "Bull's Horns".

== Personal life ==
William Arturo Muñoz González was born on September 29, 1988, in Tala, Jalisco, Mexico, the oldest son of Arturo Muñoz Sánchez, a luchador, or professional wrestler, who is best known under the ring names "Comandante Pierroth", "La Bestia del Ring" ("The beast of the ring") and "Toro Blanco" ("white bull"), the latter of which Rush later adopted as one of his own nicknames.

He has at least two younger brothers who also became professional wrestlers, Carlos (born 1991), better known as Dralístico, and Emmanuel (born 1995), better known as Dragon Lee.

== Championships and accomplishments ==
- Consejo Mundial de Lucha Libre
  - CMLL World Light Heavyweight Championship (1 time)
  - CMLL World Tag Team Championship (2 times) – with La Máscara (1) and El Terrible (1)
  - CMLL World Trios Championship (1 time) – with Marco Corleone and Máximo
  - Mexican National Trios Championship (2 times) – with Ángel de Oro and Diamante (1) and La Máscara and Titán (1)
  - Leyenda Azul (2017)
  - CMLL Torneo Nacional de Parejas Increíbles (2018) – with El Terrible
  - Copa CMLL (2014) – with Marco Corleone
  - Copa Pachuca (2012) – with El Terrible
  - CMLL Bodybuilding Contest – Advanced (2010)
  - CMLL World Tag Team Championship #1 Contender's Tournament (2013) – with La Máscara
  - Mexican National Trios Championship #1 Contender's tournament (2011) – with Ángel de Oro and Diamante
- Kaoz Lucha Libre
  - Kaoz Heavyweight Championship (1 time)
- Mucha Lucha Atlanta
  - MLA Heavyweight Championship (1 time)
- Pro Wrestling Illustrated
  - Ranked No. 18 of the top 500 wrestlers in the PWI 500 in 2020
- Ring of Honor
  - ROH World Championship (2 times)
  - ROH World Tag Team Championship (1 time) – with Sammy Guevara
- Wrestling Observer Newsletter
  - Best Gimmick (2017) as part of Los Ingobernables de Japón

== Luchas de Apuestas record ==
Winner (wager)	Loser (wager)	Location	Event	Date	Notes
Rush (hair)	Loco Max (hair)	Mexico City	CMLL Domingos Arena Mexico	August 15, 2010	
Rush (hair)	Yoshihashi (hair)	Puebla, Puebla	CMLL Lunes Arena Puebla	August 1, 2011	
Rush (hair)	El Terrible (hair)	Mexico City	CMLL 79th Anniversary Show	September 14, 2012	
Rush (hair)	Shocker (hair)	Mexico City	CMLL Homenaje a Dos Leyendas	March 21, 2014	
Rush (hair)	Negro Casas (hair)	Mexico City	CMLL El Juicio Final	August 1, 2014	
Rush (hair)	Máximo Sexy (hair)	Mexico City	CMLL Homenaje a Dos Leyendas	March 18, 2016	
Bárbaro Cavernario and Rush (hair)	Matt Taven and Volador Jr. (hair)	Mexico City	CMLL 85th Anniversary Show	September 14, 2018	
