= La Peste Negra =

Professional wrestling stable

Stable
- Members: Bárbaro Cavernario; El Felino
- Former members: Herodes, Jr. Heavy Metal; Mr. Niebla; Princesa Blanca; Rey Bucanero; Negro Casas
- Debut: July 2008
- Disbanded: January 2020

La Peste Negra (Spanish for "The Black Plague") was a Mexican professional wrestling rudo (villainous) stable in the Consejo Mundial de Lucha Libre (CMLL) promotion. The core of the group is the Casas wrestling family, which includes members Negro Casas and El Felino and former members Heavy Metal and Princesa Blanca. The group is rounded out by Mr. Niebla and rookies Bárbaro Cavernario and Herodes, Jr. The group was founded in July 2008 when Mr. Niebla returned to CMLL after working for Asistencia Asesoría y Administración (AAA). The group has consistently been used at the main event and semi-main event level in CMLL. Their motto is "be heinous and stinky"

== History ==
In July 2008 Mr. Niebla returned to Consejo Mundial de Lucha Libre (CMLL) after working for its rival Asistencia Asesoría y Administración (AAA) for over a year. Upon his return to CMLL he formed a group with Negro Casas and Heavy Metal called La Peste Negra (Spanish for "the Black Plague). The group was a rudo (bad guy) group that had a more comical approach to wrestling. The trio started wearing large afro wigs, painting their faces black and dancing during their entrances and generally worked a less serious style of match than unusual, especially for a serious wrestler like Negro Casas. On September 2, 2008 the last Casas brother, El Felino turned rudo as well and joined La Peste Negra. After Felino joined the group Heavy Metal was quietly phased out as he was not comfortable working the comedic style. Felino's wife Princesa Blanca joined the group in January 2009, turning rudo to work with La Peste Negra, the turn led to Princesa Blanca winning the Mexican National Women's Championship from Marcela on January 30, 2009.

La Pesta Negra's main storyline was a feud with CMLL's top tecnico (fan favorite) Místico, a storyline that began in late 2008. At the 2009 Homenaje a Dos Leyendas show Negro Casas defeated Místico to win the CMLL World Welterweight Championship The storyline continued over the summer, with La Peste Negra facing Místico and his various allies. The feud led to Místico and Negro Casas facing off in a Lucha de Apuesta, mask vs. hair match, at the CMLL 76th Anniversary Show, where Casas lost two falls to one and had his hair shaved off as a result. After the match Místico challenged El Felino, Casas' corner man, to a Lucha de Apuesta with their masks on the line, although nothing came of it at the time. Negro Casas would later win the CMLL World Middleweight Championship from El Hijo del Fantasma on February 14, 2010.

In early 2010 El Felino began a storyline feud with La Sombra. The feud began on February 2, 2010 with a singles match between El Felino and La Sombra, after each wrestler won a fall a Puma King, El Felino's son, showed up wearing an El Felino outfit and mask, distracting both the referee and La Sombra long enough for El Felino to land a low blow on La Sombra to win the match. The two met in a Lightning match (a one fall, 10 minute time limit match) on the February 19 CMLL Super Viernes show. Once again Puma King tried to help his father, but this time the referee disqualified El Felino for the transgression. After the main event of the February 20's show between Místico, La Máscara and Negro Casas against Volador Jr., Último Guerrero and Héctor Garza Místico challengede Volador, Jr. to a Lucha de Apuesta, or bet match, between the two with their masks on the line. During the main event La Sombra came to Volador Jr's aid while El Felino helped Místico. In the aftermath of the February 20 Super Viernes it was announced that Volador Jr. and La Sombra would team up and face El Felino and Místico at Homenaje a Dos Leyendas, in a Relevos Suicida match where the first two wrestlers pinned would have to wrestle each other for their masks. At Homenaje a Dos Leyendas El Felino was the first man pinned, followed by La Sombra. After a quick match between the two La Sombra pinned El Felino and forced him to unmask, per lucha libre traditions. Following his mask loss El Felino enjoyed a bit of a resurgence with the fans, cheering him on as he began targeting Místico. The two even wrestled in a singles match which El Felino won, but the storyline was dropped after that.

=== Peste Con Amour ===
In early 2010 Mr. Niebla was entered in the first ever Torneo Nacional de Parejas Increibles tournament a tournament where CMLL teams up a Tecnico and a Rudo for a tournament where the teams represent the region they trained in. Mr. Niebla teamed up with the tecnico Máximo, forming a team that was quickly nicknamed La Peste con Amour ("the Love Plague") born from Mr. Niebla being part of La Peste Negra and Máximo's Exótico ring character. In the first round Niebla and Máximo defeated the team of Blue Panther and Misterioso II. La Peste con Amour won when Máximo kissed Panther, distracting him long enough for Mr. Niebla to sneak up behind him to roll him up for the pin fall. In the second round the team faced Atlantis and Máscara Dorada but were defeated when Máximo tried to kiss Atlantis to distract him, but ended up kissing Mr. Niebla instead, making him susceptible to a roll-up and pin fall. Following their exit from the Parejas Incredibles tournament Máximo and Mr. Niebla continued to team up blending their comedic styles for a very entertaining team. The team was originally scheduled to work the 2010 Homenaje a Dos Leyendas show but the booking was reshuffled as Mr. Niebla was forced to take some time off due to a knee injury.

=== Rey Bucanero ===
Negro Caras travelled to Japan to work an extended tour for New Japan Pro-Wrestling in April and May 2010. During the tour he wrestled several tag team matches against Jushin Thunder Liger, ending the tour with a singles match against Liger on May 3, 2010 where he lost the CMLL Middleweight Championship to Liger. In July and August 2010 Rey Bucanero filled in for Mr. Niebla while he was out with a knee injury and teamed up with Negro Casas and El Felino. When he teamed with La Peste Negra Bucanero wore ring gear that looked more like Jack Sparrow from the Pirates of the Caribbean movie series and less like his fellow Guerreros del Atlantia members. He was also given a mascot, a Mini-Estrella wearing a parrot outfit that accompanied him to the ring. In August, 2010 Rey Bucanero announced that he had left Los Guerreros and joined La Peste Negra because his old group was more interested in teaming with Olímpico than him. Over the summer months La Peste Negra began targeting a group known as Los Invasores, with the two groups clashing several times, with focus on La Peste Negra facing the CMLL World Tag Team Champions Mr. Águila and Héctor Garza, in a storyline that may lead to a title match between the two groups in the future. In the aftermath of the August 13, 2010 Super Viernes Mr. Niebla was added to the cage match main event of the CMLL 77th Anniversary Show, opposite the masked members of Los Invasores, Psicosis II, Histeria, El Alebrije and 10 others. Subsequently CMLL announced a "Trios Match" between the remaining members of La Peste Negra and the co-leaders of Los Invasores (Mr. Águila and Héctor Garza) and Charly Manson for the 77th Anniversary Show as well. Casas made a Lucha de Apuesta, hair vs. hair, challenge to Los Invasores After a match on the August 10, 2010 Súper Luchas, which was accepted by Los Invasores. On October 15, 2010, Los Invasores member Charly Manson defeated Negro Casas in a Lucha de Apuesta to take his hair. The loss was avenged on December 3 at Sin Piedad 2010, where Rey Bucanero defeated Los Invasores leader Mr. Águila in another Lucha de Apuesta. In April 2011 Bucanero left La Peste Negra to form a new group with El Texano, Jr. and El Terrible.

=== La Nueva Peste Negra ===
In January 2014, the Casas began teaming with El Felino's sons Puma King and Tiger, leading to Niebla launching a new Peste Negra with rookie wrestlers Bárbaro Cavernario and Herodes, Jr. Though it initially seemed that the original La Peste Negra had broken into two, El Felino and Negro Casas resumed teaming with Mr. Niebla the following month, forming a new five-man version of the stable. On February 14, Niebla and Cavernario defeated Soberano Jr. and Volador Jr. in the finals to win the 2014 Torneo Gran Alternativa. On February 18, Casas, El Felino and Niebla defeated La Máscara, Rush and Titán to win the Mexican National Trios Championship. On August 6, Herodes, Jr. announced his departure from CMLL. On April 26, 2015, La Peste Negra lost the Mexican National Trios Championship to Los Reyes de la Atlantida (Atlantis, Delta and Guerrero Maya Jr.).

The stable disbanded following the untimely death of Mr. Niebla in December 2019. Bárbaro Cavernario & El Felino entered into a heated feud as a result of differing stances on the decision, intended to culminate in a hair vs hair Apuestas match at the 2020 Homenaje a Dos Leyendas event. It was delayed until September 2021 as a result of the COVID-19 pandemic.

== Championships and accomplishments ==
- Consejo Mundial de Lucha Libre
  - CMLL World Middleweight Championship (1 time) – Casas
  - CMLL World Welterweight Championship (1 time) – Casas
  - Mexican National Trios Championship (1 time) – Casas, Felino and Niebla
  - Mexican National Welterweight Championship (1 time, – Cavernario
  - Mexican National Women's Championship (1 time) – Blanca
  - NWA World Historic Welterweight Championship (1 time) – Casas
  - CMLL Torneo Gran Alternativa (2014) – Cavernario and Niebla
  - CMLL Torneo Nacional de Parejas Increibles (2012) – Niebla and Atlantis
  - Leyenda de Plata (2014, 2015) – Casas

== Luchas de Apuestas record ==
Winner (wager)	Loser (wager)	Location	Event	Date	Notes
Místico (mask)	Negro Casas (hair)	Mexico City	CMLL 76th Anniversary Show	September 19, 2008	
La Sombra (mask)	El Felino (mask)	Mexico City	Homenaje a Dos Leyendas	March 19, 2010	(Note: First two wrestlers pinned in a Relevos Suicida match that also included Místico and Volador Jr.)
Charly Manson (hair)	Negro Casas (hair)	Mexico City	CMLL Entre el Cielo y el Infierno	October 15, 2010	
Rey Bucanero (hair)	Mr. Águila (hair)	Mexico City	Sin Piedad	December 3, 2010	
