= Sin Piedad (2010) =

Mexican professional wrestling supercard show

- Official poster for the event
- Promotion: Consejo Mundial de Lucha Libre (CMLL)
- Date: December 3, 2010
- City: Mexico City, Mexico
- Venue: Arena México
- Attendance: 8.400

Pay-per-view chronology
← Previous; Entre el Cielo y el Infierno	Next → La Copa Junior

Sin Piedad chronology
← Previous; 2008	Next → 2011

Sin Piedad (2010) (Spanish for "No Mercy") was a professional wrestling major show produced by Consejo Mundial de Lucha Libre (CMLL) that took place on December 3, 2010 in CMLL's home arena Arena México in Mexico City, Mexico. The 2010 Sin Piedad was the eight event under that name that CMLL promoted as their last major show of the year, always held in December. The main event of the evening featured a Lucha de Apuestas, hair vs. hair match, that was a continuation of the "CMLL vs. Los Invasores" storyline as CMLL representative Rey Bucanero defeated Invasore Co-Captain Mr. Águila, forcing him to have his hair shaved off after the match. The show also featured an additional Lucha de Apuestas, this time with both participants' masks on the line. The match saw Mini-Estrella wrestler Eléctrico defeat Pequeño Black Warrior, forcing him to unmask after the match. The show featured four additional matches, three Best two out of three falls Six-man tag team matches and an Eight-man tag team match.

== Production ==
=== Background ===
The Mexican wrestling company Consejo Mundial de Lucha Libre (Spanish for "World Wrestling Council"; CMLL) has held a number of major shows over the years using the moniker Sin Piedad ("No Pity" or "No Mercy"). CMLL has intermittently held a show billed specifically as Sin Piedad since 2000, primarily using the name for their "end of the year" show in December, although once they held a Sin Piedad show in August as well. CMLL has on occasion used a different name for the end-of-year show but Sin Piedad is the most commonly used name. All Sin Piedad shows have been held in Arena México in Mexico City, Mexico which is CMLL's main venue, its "home". Traditionally CMLL holds their major events on Friday Nights, which means the Sin Piedad shows replace their regularly scheduled Super Viernes show. The 2010 Sin Piedad show was the ninth show to use the name.

=== Storylines ===
The event featured six professional wrestling matches with different wrestlers involved in pre-existing scripted feuds, plots and storylines. Wrestlers were portrayed as either heels (referred to as rudos in Mexico, those that portray the "bad guys") or faces (técnicos in Mexico, the "good guy" characters) as they followed a series of tension-building events, which culminated in a wrestling match or series of matches.

The feature event and main selling point of the 2012 Sin Piedad event was the result of the storyline feud between CMLL and a group of wrestlers primarily associated with CMLL's main rival AAA known as Los Invasores. The Invasores storyline began on April 12, 2010 when a contingent of former AAA wrestlers including Psicosis, Histeria, Maniaco, El Alebrije and Cuije appeared during a CMLL show in Puebla, Puebla. The group drown into the arena in a black SUV and attacked La Sombra, El Hijo del Fantasma and La Máscara after they had just finished a match. In the following months the storyline became the main focus of CMLL's storylines and involved a number of different wrestlers. In the months leading up to the CMLL 77th Anniversary Show Rey Bucanero and the rest of La Peste Negra (El Felino and Negro Casas) facing off the Invasores trio of Charly Manson, Héctor Garza and the recently returned Mr. Águila. At the show La Peste Negra won the match, with Bucanero taking the deciding fall for his team. It was originally believed that Bucanero would face off against Charly Manson from Los Invasores, but instead Bucanero and Mr. Águila began focusing their efforts on each other, usually on opposite sides of various six-man tag team matches. In the weeks leading up to Sin Piedad Bucanero challenged Mr. Águila to put his hair on the line in a Lucha de Apuestas, or bet match between the two. Águila agreed and the two signed the contract for the main event a few weeks before the Sin Piedad event.

For years Victor Resendiz, better known as Latin Lover, had worked for AAA, making a name for himself. He had also been quite successful in other television appearances and broke away from AAA to handle his own match bookings. Following his departure AAA sought an injunction against him using the name "Latin Lover", claiming they owned the copyright to the name. In November 2010 he sat at ringside for a Friday night CMLL Super Viernes show, causing quite a stir with his appearance as he fought against Los Invasores, especially co-captain Héctor Garza who had been a rival of Latin Lover in AAA. Los Invasores attacked Rezendiz before he was saved by Shocker. Days later he was announced as using the ring name Latino in CMLL. It was later announced that Latino would team up with Guapos Internacional (Shocker and Jon Strongman) and CMLL's top tecnico Místico for Sin Piedad. The team would face Invasores co-captain Héctor Garza, teaming with CMLL rudos Atlantis and La Peste Negra (El Felino and Negro Casas).

In the fall of 2010 CMLL's Mini-Estrellas division began to focus on the storyline feud between the two enmascarados Pequeño Black Warrior and Eléctrico. The experienced Pequeño Black Warrior, a smaller version of Black Warrior started to target the tecnico Eléctrico during a number of matches, stating after one of the matches that he wanted the young, much less experienced Eléctrico to "pay his dues" in the ring. The feud started out during a six-man tag team match where Pequeño Warrior began targeting Eléctrico, often tearing his young opponent's mask open, at times even pulling it off at times to gain an unfair advantage in the match. After being the victim for a number of weeks Eléctrico fought back, at least once winning the match by pulling Pequeño Black Warrior's mask off. After several inconclusive matches the two masked wrestlers agreed to wrestle for the ultimate prize in Lucha Libre, their masks.

The third match of the night centered around the developing rivalry between the tecnico El Hijo del Fantasma ("Son of Fantasma") and Mephisto, both second generation wrestlers. The rivalry had begun months earlier during a six-man tag team match in Guadalajara, Jalisco where a wrongly executed move by Hijo del Fantasma led to Mephisto accidentally being injured. Once the rudo returned to the ring he targeted Hijo del Fantasma to get his revenge. For the match Mephisto had back up from his fellow Los Hijos del Averno ("Sons of Hell") members Averno and Ephesto, while Hijo del Fantasma teamed with two thirds of La Generacion Oro ("The Golden Generation") La Sombra and La Mascara.

One wrestling magazine described the second match as Las futuras estrellas en accion (Spanish for "The future stars in action"), with six wrestlers who were all looking to establish themselves as a top name in the promotion in the future. On one side two of the five Los Cancerberos del Infierno ("The Infernal Cerberus), Euforia and Pólvora would be teamed up with the most experienced wrestler in the match, Sangre Azteca. While Azteca was the most experienced he was still looking for an opportunity to "break through" and move up the ranks of CMLL past his current mid-card position. Their opponents was a team that did not usually team up as CMLL decided to team up three of their young tecnicos, Delta, Stuka Jr. and Valiente for the second match of the night, giving all six men the opportunity to perform on a high-profile show to demonstrate their skills in the ring.

When Los Invasores originally appeared many people speculated that both female and Mini-Estrella Invasores would follow them to CMLL. Tiffany had originally worked for AAA for a number of years, but in mid-2010 she appeared on the CMLL affiliated Promociones Gutiérrez 1st Anniversary Show along with a number of other non-CMLL wrestlers. Weeks later she made her official CMLL debut becoming the first Invasora. She would soon be joined by Estrellita, who had been a tecnico in AAA but as part of Los Invasoras she played the rudo part instead. The two were often joined by another "Outsider", Mima Shimoda, who was a CMLL regular but from Japan and thus fit the "Outsider" image. The three "Outsiders" were matched up against two of CMLL's top female tecnicas, Dark Angel and Marcela as well as relative newcomer Luna Mágica, none of them had a specific storyline reason for being in the match beyond "defending CMLL".

== Event ==
In the opening match Las Invasoras lost the first fall when Marcela pinned Mima Shimoda, putting the CMLL side up by a fall in quick order. The outsiders fought back in the second fall, tying the match between the two teams. In the third and final match the least experienced member of the tecnico team, Luna Mágica, forced Estrellita to submit. The submission gave the CMLL team the victory in the opening match of the night. In the second match the tecnico team of Delta, Stuka Jr. and Valiente faced Sangre Azteca, Eurforia and Pólvora in a six-man tag team match. In the first fall Valiente displayed his high flying skills with what was described as a "Spectacular flight" by one source. The first fall went to the tecnico team, while the rudo team took the second fall in quick order. In the third and final fall problems between Sangre Azteca and Pólvora caused enough dissension on the team for the tecnicos to take advantage of it and gain the third and final fall for their team. Following the match Azteca and Pólvora began arguing and almost got into a fight.

The fact that the driving storyline behind the third match was between Hijo del Famtasma and Mephisto was made obvious early on as Mephisto tore Hijo del Fantasma's mask apart in the first fall. La Mascara managed to secure the first fall for the tecnico team when he applied La Campana ("The Bell" a reverse Boston Crab submission hold) on Averno. In the second fall Hijo del Fantasma pays Mephisto back by ripping Mephisto's mask apart in several places, but in the end Mephisto retaliates and tears Hijo del Fantasma's mask totally off, which is an automatic disqualification in Lucha Libre. With the DQ the team of Hijo del Fantasma, La Mascara and La Sombra won the match, but Mephisto left the arena with Hijo del Fantasma's mask as a trophy. For the fourth match of the night, the first Luchas de Apuesta, Eléctrico was accompanied by Ángel de Oro while Pequeño Black Warrior had fellow Mini-Estrella rudo Pequeño Olímpico in his corner for the high-profile match. The first fall quickly went to Pequeño Warrior, putting the tecnico Eléctrico behind and forcing him to claw and fight back to win the second fall of the match. The third fall saw both wrestlers turn up the intensity as they fought for their masked identity, but in the end the younger Eléctrico won the fall and the match by submission. Following the match Pequeño Black Warrior unmasked in the middle of the ring as lucha libre traditions dictate and revealed that his real name was Humberto Sánchez Medorio and had been a professional wrestler for 20 years. With the unmasking it was confirmed that he was the same wrestler who had originally played the original Mini Psicosis in AAA as many people had suspected.

During the introduction of the participants of the fifth match the rudos, who had entered first, jumped Guapos Internacional (Shocker and Strongman) with La Peste Negra attacking Strongman while Atlantis jumped on Shocker as he entered the ring. When Latino entered the ring rival Héctor Garza attacked him from behind. The arrival of Místico drew a standing ovation from the crowd, but it did not turn the advantage as the rudos kept beating down their opponents even before the bell. Once the bell rang the rudos ignored the referee's instructions and were disqualified for excessive violence against the tecnico team. In the second fall Latino ended up with Garza in a pinning predicament, and despite the intentionally slow count from crooked referee El Titantes Latino won the second fall, taking the match in two straight falls for his side. The main event was refereed by El Tirantes, a rudo referee that especially took the side of Los Invasores since he also worked for AAA for many years. Mr. Águila was the first, followed by Rey Bucanero who was accompanied by Perico the parrot, his mascota. The crowd was solidly behind the "home team" of Rey Bucanero, voicing their support even before the opening bell rang. During the first fall El Tirantes allowed Mr. Águila to blatantly cheat to take the first fall. Following the match Jose Luis Mendieta, a representative of the Mexico City boxing and wrestling commission, removed El Tirantes as referee of the match and replaced him with Baby Richards, an impartial referee. With his advantage gone Mr. Águila was on the defensive from the beginning and Bucanero managed to tie up the match with one fall apiece only minutes later. The third fall saw the advantage shift between the two with Mr. Águila looking like he was about to take Rey Bucanero's hair on several occasions, but in the end Bucanero pinned Mr. Águila to win the match. The crowd showed their vocal appreciation while Mr. Águila had his long mohawk shaved off in the middle of the ring.

== Aftermath ==
While the Los Invasores storyline continued after Sin Piedad the issue between Rey Bucanero and Mr. Águila was settled. Bucanero broke away from La Peste Negra to form La Fuerza TRT along with El Texano Jr. and El Terrible. Latino only made one more appearance for CMLL before leaving the company, dropping the storyline. On December 14, 2010, Shocker defeated El Texano Jr. to win the NWA World Historic Light Heavyweight Championship. However, just five days later he suffered a patellar tendon rupture and a meniscal tear in his knee that required surgery and would sideline him for 12 to 16 weeks. When Shocker returned no mention was made of Guapos Internacional, nor did Shocker team with Jon Strongman on a regular basis. It was believed that the Hijo del Fantasma and Mephisto storyline would lead to a Luchas de Apuestas match, but the storyline was dropped in early 2011 when CMLL learned that Hijo del Fantasma had a try-out with the World Wrestling Entertainment (WWE) along with other CMLL wrestlers such as Místico. While Hijo del Fantasma did not get to WWE, Místico did leave CMLL to work under the ring name Sin Cara, leading to CMLL punishing those that participated in the try out that cost CMLL their main tecnico worker. After teasing a turn for weeks Sangre Azteca finally turned to the tecnico side in the weeks following Sin Piedad. Estrellita only remained with Las Invasoras for a short time after Sin Piedad, turning tecnica while Tiffany remained on the Rudo side but with no emphasis on her AAA past or any link to Los Invasores.

=== Results ===
No.	Results	Stipulations
1	Dark Angel, Luna Mágica and Marcela defeated Mima Shimoda and Las Invasoras (Estrellita and Tiffany) – two falls to one	Best two-out-of-three falls six-woman "Lucha Libre rules" tag team match
2	Delta, Stuka Jr. and Valiente defeated Los Cancerberos del Infierno (Euforia and Pólvora) and Sangre Azteca – two falls to one	Best two-out-of-three falls six-man "Lucha Libre rules" tag team match
3	El Hijo del Fantasma, La Mascara and La Sombra defeated Los Hijos del Averno (Averno, Ephesto and Mephisto) – two falls to none	Best two-out-of-three falls six-man "Lucha Libre rules" tag team match
4	Eléctrico defeated Pequeño Black Warrior – two falls to one	Best two-out-of-three falls Lucha de Apuestas, mask vs. mask match
5	Guapos Internacional (Jon Strongman and Shocker), Latino and Místico defeated Atlantis, Héctor Garza and La Peste Negra (El Felino and Negro Casas) – two falls to none	Best two-out-of-three falls eight-man "Lucha Libre rules" tag team match
6	Rey Bucanero defeated Mr. Águila – two falls to one	Best two-out-of-three falls Lucha de Apuestas, hair vs. hair match
