= Torneo Gran Alternativa (2014) =

Mexican professional wrestling tournament

- Promotion: Consejo Mundial de Lucha Libre
- Date: January 31, 2014 – February 14, 2014
- City: Mexico City, Mexico
- Venue: Arena Mexico
- Tagline(s): Poster advertising the Gran Alternativa finale on February 14

Event chronology
← Previous; Fantastica Mania	Next → Torneo Nacional de Parejas Increíbles

Torneo Gran Alternativa chronology
← Previous; 2013	Next → 2016

The Torneo Gran Alternativa (2014) was a professional wrestling tournament event produced by Consejo Mundial de Lucha Libre (CMLL) that took place from January 31 until February 14, 2014, over the course of two CMLL Super Viernes shows, with the finals on the Arena Mexico 57th Anniversary Show. The Torneo Gran Alternativa (Spanish for "the Great Alternative tournament) concept sees a Novato or rookie team up with an experienced wrestler for a tag team tournament. The rookie winner has often been elevated up the ranks of CMLL as a result of winning the tournament, but there is no specific "prize" for winning the tournament beyond a symbolic trophy. The tournament was won by rookie Cavernario and veteran Mr. Niebla, the success of the tournament led to Cavernario being added to Mr. Niebla's group La Peste Negra

== Tournament background ==
The tournament featured 15 professional wrestling matches with different wrestlers teaming up, some of which may be involved in pre-existing scripted feuds or storylines while others are simply paired up for the tournament. Wrestlers portray either villains (referred to as Rudos in Mexico) or fan favorites (Técnicos in Mexico) as they compete in wrestling matches with pre-determined outcomes. The tournament format follows CMLL's traditional tournament formats, with two qualifying blocks of eight teams that compete on the first and second week of the tournament and a final match between the two block winners. The qualifying blocks were one-fall matches while the tournament finals will be a best two-out-of-three falls tag team match. Each qualifying block started with all 8 Novatos competing in a "seeding" battle royal to determine the brackets for the block. The team of Cavernario and Mr. Niebla defeated Soberano Jr. and Volador Jr. in the finals on February 14. Out of all the Novato participants seven of them had participated in the Gran Alternativa tournament before, primarily the 2013 tournament; Soberano Jr., Oro Jr., Guerrero Negro Jr., Herodes Jr., Espanto Jr., Akuma and Hombre Bala Jr.

2014 Gran Alternativa participants

Block	Rookie	Veteran
Block A	Akuma	Rey Bucanero
Block A	Cachorro	Blue Panther
Block A	Espanto, Jr.	Mephisto
Block A	Guerrero Negro, Jr.	El Terrible
Block A	Hombre Bala, Jr.	Maximo
Block A	Oro, Jr.	La Sombra
Block A	Soberano Jr.	Volador Jr.
Block A	El Rebelde	Averno
Block B	Black Panther	Diamante Azul
Block B	Canelo Casas	Negro Casas
Block B	Cavernario	Mr. Niebla
Block B	Dragon Lee	Rush
Block B	Espiritu Negro	Reapper
Block B	Hechicero	Último Guerrero
Block B	Herodes, Jr.	Shocker
Block B	Star, Jr.	Atlantis

== Tournament results ==
First round
1	El Rebelde and Averno
16	Cachorro and Blue Panther	W
8	Akuma and Rey Bucanero
9	Oro, Jr. and La Sombra	W
5	Guerrero Negro, Jr. and El Terrible	W
12	Hombre Bala, Jr. and Maximo
4	Espanto, Jr. and Mephisto
13	Soberano Jr. and Volador Jr.	W
6	Herodes, Jr. and Shocker	W
11	Espiritu Negro and Reapper
3	Canelo Casas and Negro Casas
14	Dragon Lee and Rush	W
7	Black Panther and Diamante Azul
10	Cavernario and Mr. Niebla	W
2	Hechicero and Último Guerrero	W
15	Star, Jr. and Atlantis

Quarter-finals
Cachorro and Blue Panther
Oro, Jr. and La Sombra	W
Guerrero Negro, Jr. and El Terrible
Soberano Jr. and Volador Jr.	W
Herodes, Jr. and Shocker
Dragon Lee and Rush	W
Cavernario and Mr. Niebla	W
Hechicero and Último Guerrero

Semi-finals
Oro, Jr. and La Sombra
Soberano Jr. and Volador Jr.	W
Dragon Lee and Rush
Cavernario and Mr. Niebla	W

Final
Soberano Jr. and Volador Jr.
Cavernario and Mr. Niebla	W
