= Los Invasores =

Professional wrestling stable

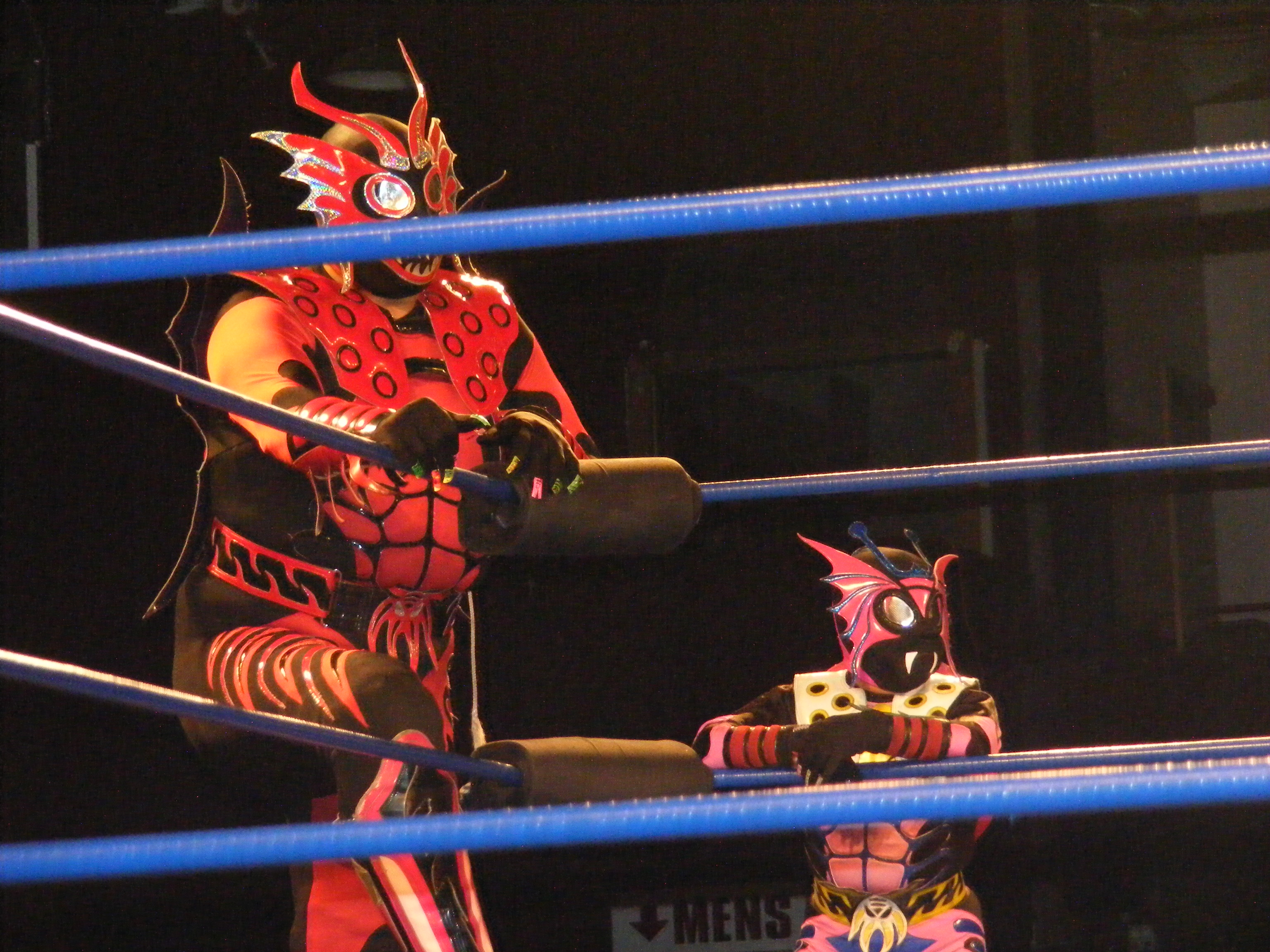
- El Alebrije (left) and Cuije (right) members of Los Invasores

Stable
- Members: Mr. Águila (Leader); Kraneo; Mije; Morphosis; Olímpico; Reapper; Black Warrior; Charly Manson; Estrellita; Héctor Garza; Máscara Año 2000; Monster; El Oriental; Maniaco; Universo 2000; Tiffany; Volador Jr.
- Name(s): Los Independientes; Los Super Libres; Los Invasores
- Debut: April 12, 2010

Los Invasores (Spanish for "The Invaders") was a Mexican professional wrestling group, referred to as a stable in wrestling terms, working for Consejo Mundial de Lucha Libre (CMLL). The group was portrayed as a group of "outsiders" invading CMLL, but in fact they all worked full-time for CMLL. The group was composed mainly of former Asistencia Asesoría y Administración (AAA) wrestlers and was led by Mr. Águila.

== History ==
On April 12, 2010 a contingent of former Asistencia Asesoría y Administración (AAA) wrestlers including Psicosis II, Histeria, Maniaco, El Alebrije and Cuije showed up during a Consejo Mundial de Lucha Libre (CMLL) show in Puebla, Puebla. The group drove into the arena driving a black SUV and attacked La Sombra, El Hijo del Fantasma and La Máscara after they just finished a match. Brazo de Plata, Místico and Jon Strongman tried to help the technicos (good guys), but were kept away from the ring by the CMLL rudos (villains) Averno, El Texano, Jr. and El Terrible. Following the attack the former AAA wrestlers returned to the SUV and left the arena. The attack was the first appearance of a group that would quickly be dubbed "Los Independientes" (Spanish for "The Independents"), referring to the fact that they all worked on the independent circuit and claimed to be better than the CMLL wrestlers. During the next run in the group included Monster and his companion Chucky in addition to the other Independientes. After weeks of run-ins the group wrestled their first match for CMLL on April 26, 2010. In their debut El Alebrije, Histeria and Psicosis defeated El Hijo del Fantasma, La Mascara and La Sombra. Since the beginning of the "Los Independientes" storyline neither Psicosis nor Histeria have worked on Perro del Mal events. On May 10, 2010, during a match between Los Independientes and CMLL wrestlers former CMLL and AAA wrestlers Universo 2000 and Máscara Año 2000 ran in to help Los Independientes beat up on their opponents, taking their side in the storyline between independent wrestlers and CMLL. Psicosis would be the first wrestler to face off against a CMLL wrestler in singles competition as he faced and lost to El Hijo del Fantasma by disqualification. The group's name was subsequently changed to "LosSúper Luchas", before they finally settled on the name "Los Invasores" (Spanish for "the Invaders"). On May 16, 2010 Psicosis wrestled in the first ever Independiendes singles match against La Sombra. The match saw the surprise appearance of both Mr. Águila and Rayo de Jalisco, Jr. Mr. Águila returned to CMLL to side with Los Independientes while Rayo de Jalisco, Jr. ended up siding with the CMLL workers in their war against the outsider group. During a trios match against Los Invasores (represented by Alebrije, Histeria and Maniaco) Héctor Garza turned on his partners, Brazo de Plata and Toscano, and joined sides with Los Invasores. On May 20, 2010 CMLL held a press conference to announce that they would be holding a special Sin Salida event on June 6, 2010 and that that event would center around the "Los Invasores vs. CMLL" storyline. It was also announced that Garza and Mr. Águila were the co-leaders of Los Invasores. During the press conference Olímpico was revealed as part of the Invasores group, making him the only member to have never worked for AAA before.

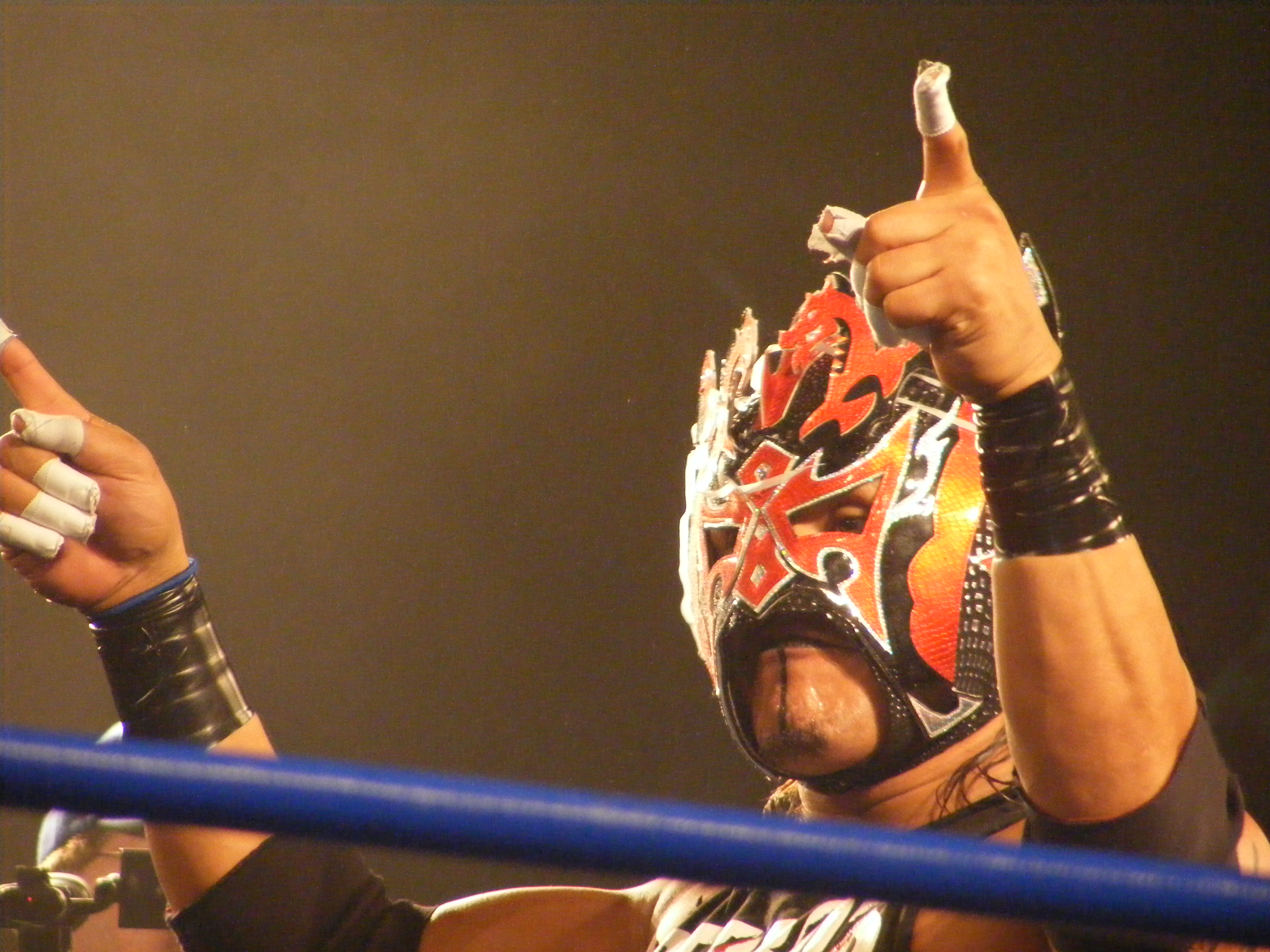
El Oriental before he was unmasked

Los Invasores featured in four of the six matches at CMLL's 2010 Sin Salida show. In the second match of the night Metro, Rush and Stuka, Jr. defeated Histeria, Maniaco and Monsther. The third match saw Shocker, Hijo del Fantasma and La Máscara defeat Psicosis II, Olímpico and |El Alebrije by disqualification when Los Invasores were disqualified for excessive violence. The four match saw Invasor Mr. Águila team up with CMLL wrestlers Místico and Mascara Dorada for a Relevos Increibles to defeat Volador Jr., Averno and Negro Casas by disqualification when Volador Jr. pulled Místico's mask off. The semi-final match featured Máscara Año 2000, Universo 2000 and Giant Bernard who defeated Rayo de Jalisco, Jr., Strongman and Brazo de Plata two falls to one. The following month the Promociones Gutiérrez 1st Anniversary Show featured a series of "CMLL vs. outsiders" matches, some featuring fully fledged Los Invasores members and some featuring wrestlers who did not regularly work for CMLL making a special appearance. One of the wrestlers who had not worked for CMLL up until that point was Charly Manson, who would parlay his appearance at the anniversary show into a full-time contract with CMLL as part of Los Invasores. The main event was a 5 team Ruleta de la Muerte elimination match that came down to Místico and El Oriental (representing Los Invasores) wrestling in a Lucha de Apuesta, mask vs. mask match which Místico won, forcing El Oriental to unmask. At the July 16, 2010 Super Viernes Héctor Garza and Mr. Águila defeated the team of La Sombra and Volador Jr. to win the CMLL World Tag Team Championship, Garza's third reign and Mr. Águila's first reign with the title. Two days later Invasores Monster and Histeria risked their masks, the second in less than a week that Histeria risked his (he participated in the Ruleta de la Muerte), when they put their masks on the line in the steel cage match main event of the 2010 Infierno en el Ring where the last man in the cage would be unmasked. In the end both Invasores escaped the cage, leaving Ángel de Oro to defeat and unmask Fabián el Gitano. Over the summer of 2010 Psicosis II began to develop a feud with Místico, which was used as the driving force behind booking a 14-man steel cage Lucha de Apuesta match that was the main event of the CMLL 77th Anniversary Show on September 4, 2010. El Alebrije, Histeria, Olímpico and Psicosis represented Los Invasores in the cage. The unmasked members of Los Invasores, specially Mr. Águila, Garza, Manson and El Oriental began a feud with La Peste Negra, which quickly led to a Lucha de Apuesta, a hair vs. hair match. The 14-man steel cage saw Histeria and El Alebrije leave the cage in the early parts of the match and Psicosis II escaping the cage as the 12th and las tman, all keeping their masks safe. The match came down to La Sombra pinning Olímpico to unmask him. On October 15 Charly Manson defeated La Peste Negra's leader Negro Casas in a Lucha de Apuesta to take his hair. On November 2, 2010, Águila and Garza lost the CMLL World Tag Team Championship to Dragón Rojo, Jr. and Último Guerrero. On December 3 at CMLL's end of the year show Sin Piedad 2010, Mr. Águila had his trademark hair shaved off after being defeated by Rey Bucanero in a Lucha de Apuesta. Two days later one of the main members of Los Invasores, Charly Manson, made a surprise jump from CMLL back to AAA. In July 2011, Garza turned technico and left the group, which was then taken over by Volador Jr. On September 20, Volador Jr., Olímpico and Psicosis II defeated Ángel de Oro, Diamante and Rush to win the Mexican National Trios Championship. They lost the title to Los Reyes de la Atlantida (Atlantis, Delta and Guerrero Maya, Jr.) on December 16, 2011. In January 2012, El Alebrije, Cuije and Histeria were repackaged as Kraneo, Mije and Morphosis, respectively. The following June, Black Warrior, Mr. Águila and Volador Jr. formed their own Los Invasores sub-group named Los Depredadores del Aire, before regaining the Mexican National Trios Championship from Los Reyes de la Atlantida.

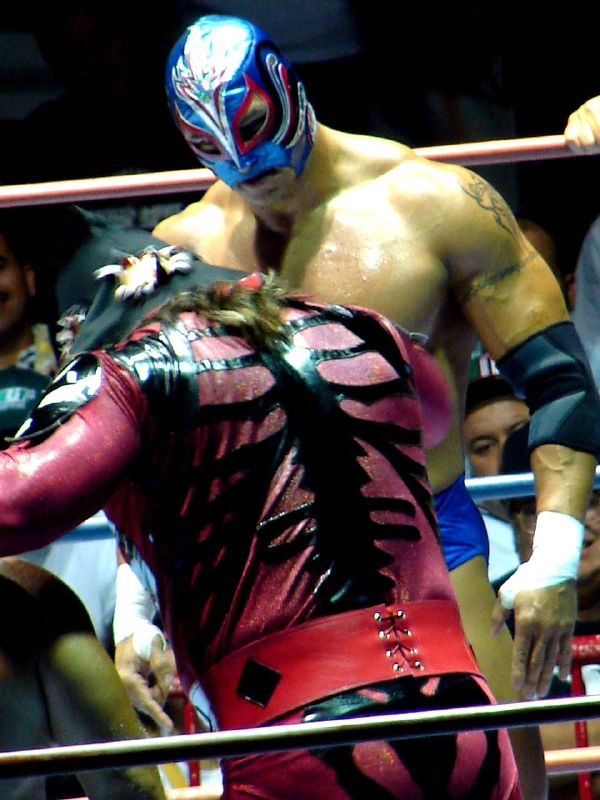
Olímpico before he was unmasked.

== Championships and accomplishments ==
- Consejo Mundial de Lucha Libre

- CMLL World Tag Team Championship (1 time) – Mr. Águila and Héctor Garza
- Mexican National Trios Championship (3 times) – Olímpico, Psicosis II and Volador Jr. (1), Black Warrior, Mr. Águila and Volador Jr. (1), and Kraneo, Mr. Águila and Psicosis II (1)
- Occidente Heavyweight Championship (1 time) – Olímpico

== Luchas de Apuestas record ==
Winner (wager)	Loser (wager)	Location	Event	Date	Notes
Místico (mask)	El Oriental (mask)	Nuevo Laredo, Tamaulipas	Promociones Gutiérrez 1st Anniversary Show	July 12, 2010	(Note: Lost a Ruleta de la Muerte elimination match that also included Atlantis and Olímpico, Averno and Último Guerrero, El Alebrije and Volador Jr., Histeria and La Sombra.)
La Sombra (mask)	Olímpico (mask)	Mexico City	CMLL 77th Anniversary Show	September 3, 2010	(Note: Last two men in a steel cage match that also included Atlantis, Último Guerrero, Jushin Thunder Liger, Mr. Niebla, Averno, Mephisto, Ephesto, Místico, Volador Jr., Psicosis II, Histeria and El Alebrije.)
Charly Manson (hair)	Negro Casas (hair)	Mexico City	CMLL Entre el Cielo y el Infierno	October 15, 2010	
Rey Bucanero (hair)	Mr. Águila (hair)	Mexico City	Sin Piedad	December 3, 2010	
La Sombra (mask)	Volador Jr. (mask)	Mexico City	CMLL 80th Anniversary Show	September 13, 2013	
