= CMLL 77th Anniversary Show =

Mexican Professional wrestling show

CMLL 77h Anniversary show
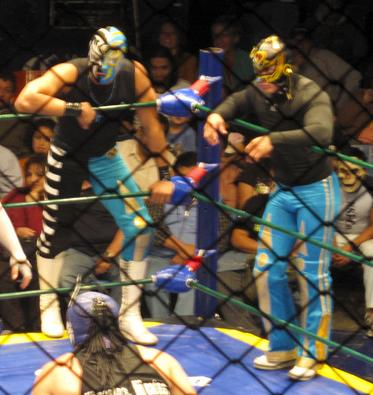
- La Sombra (left) and Volador Jr. (right) two of the 14 participants in the main event.
- Promotion: Consejo Mundial de Lucha Libre (CMLL)
- Date: September 3, 2010
- City: Mexico City, Mexico
- Venue: Arena México
- Attendance: 17,500

Event chronology
← Previous; Torneo Bicentenario de Mini-Estrellas	Next → Entre el Cielo y el Infierno

CMLL Anniversary Shows chronology
← Previous; 76th Anniversary	Next → 78th Anniversary

The 'CMLL 77th Anniversary Show (Spanish: 77. Aniversario de CMLL)' was a professional wrestling major show produced by Consejo Mundial de Lucha Libre (CMLL) that took place on September 3, 2010 in CMLL's home arena Arena México in Mexico City, Mexico. The event commemorates the 77th anniversary of CMLL, the oldest professional wrestling promotion. in the world. The Anniversary show is CMLL's biggest show of the year, their Super Bowl event. The CMLL Anniversary Show series is the longest-running annual professional wrestling show, starting in 1934. The event was also billed as Juicio Final, or "Final Justice", an event that CMLL has held previously in 1990, 1991, 2000, 2001 and 2005.

The main event of the show was a 14-man Lucha de Apuestas mask vs. mask, steel cage match contested under CMLL's Infierno en el Ring rules which meant that one man would be unmasked as a result of the match. The 14 competitors in the match were: Místico, La Sombra, Volador Jr., Averno, Mephisto, Ephesto, Jushin Thunder Liger, Último Guerrero, Atlantis, Mr. Niebla, El Alebrije, Histeria, Olímpico and Psicosis II. The match came down to La Sombra defeating Olímpico to unmask him. The show also featured five additional matches, all Best two out of three falls Six-man tag team matches.

== Production ==
=== Background ===
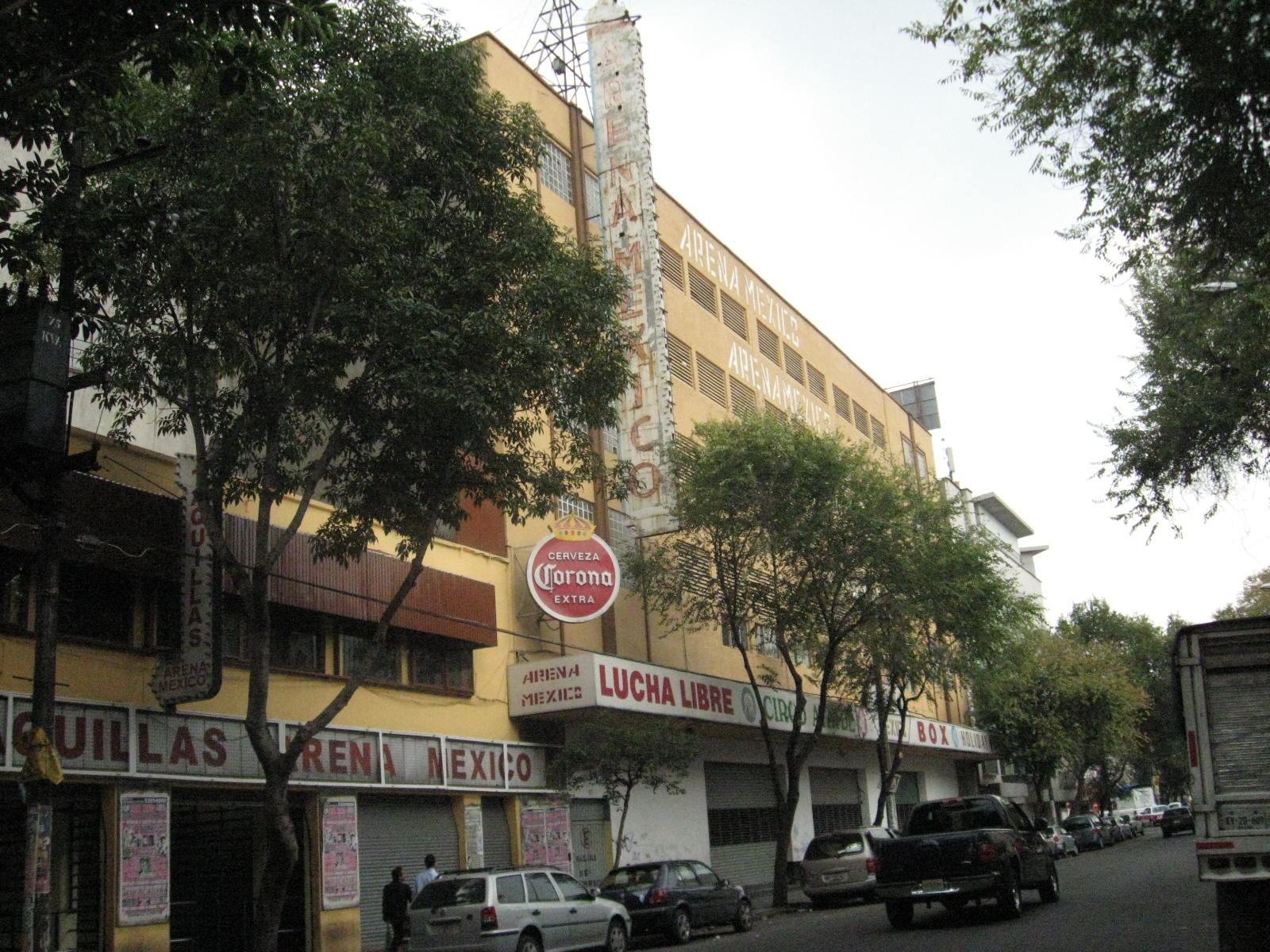
Arena México, CMLL's main venue and location of the Anniversary Show

The Mexican Lucha libre (professional wrestling) company Consejo Mundial de Lucha Libre (CMLL) started out under the name Empresa Mexicana de Lucha Libre ("Mexican Wrestling Company"; EMLL), founded by Salvador Lutteroth in 1933. Lutteroth, inspired by professional wrestling shows he had attended in Texas, decided to become a wrestling promoter and held his first show on September 21, 1933, marking what would be the beginning of organized professional wrestling in Mexico. Lutteroth would later become known as "the father of Lucha Libre" . A year later EMLL held the EMLL 1st Anniversary Show, starting the annual tradition of the Consejo Mundial de Lucha Libre Anniversary Shows that have been held each year ever since, most commonly in September.

Over the years the anniversary show would become the biggest show of the year for CMLL, akin to the Super Bowl for the National Football League (NFL) or WWE's WrestleMania event. The first anniversary show was held in Arena Modelo, which Lutteroth had bought after starting EMLL. In 1942–43 Lutteroth financed the construction of Arena Coliseo, which opened in April 1943. The EMLL 10th Anniversary Show was the first of the anniversary shows to be held in Arena Coliseo. In 1956 Lutteroth had Arena México built in the location of the original Arena Modelo, making Arena México the main venue of EMLL from that point on. Starting with the EMLL 23rd Anniversary Show, all anniversary shows except for the EMLL 46th Anniversary Show have been held in the arena that would become known as "The Cathedral of Lucha Libre". On occasion EMLL held more than one show labelled as their "Anniversary" show, such as two 33rd Anniversary Shows in 1966. Over time the anniversary show series became the oldest, longest-running annual professional wrestling show. In comparison, WWE's WrestleMania is only the fourth oldest still promoted show (CMLL's Arena Coliseo Anniversary Show and Arena México anniversary shows being second and third). EMLL was supposed to hold the EMLL 52nd Anniversary Show on September 20, 1985 but Mexico City was hit by a magnitude 8.0 earthquake. EMLL canceled the event both because of the general devastation but also over fears that Arena México might not be structurally sound after the earthquake.

When Jim Crockett Promotions was bought by Ted Turner in 1988 EMLL became the oldest still active promotion in the world. In 1991 EMLL was rebranded as "Consejo Mundial de Lucha Libre" and thus held the CMLL 59th Anniversary Show, the first under the new name, on September 18, 1992. Traditionally CMLL holds their major events on Friday Nights, replacing their regularly scheduled Super Viernes show.

=== Storylines ===
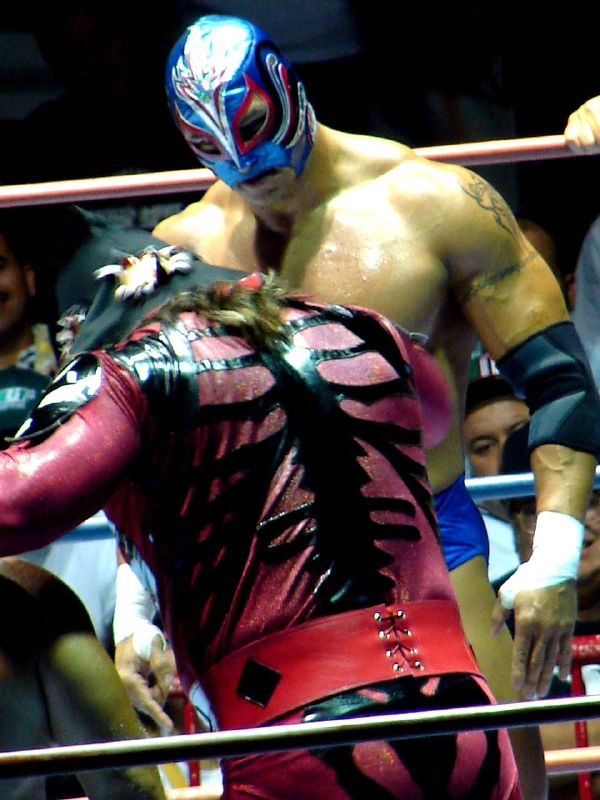
Olímpico (in blue), unmasked after the main event.

The event featured five professional wrestling matches with different wrestlers involved in pre-existing scripted feuds, plots and storylines. Wrestlers were portrayed as either heels (referred to as rudos in Mexico, those that portray the "bad guys") or faces (técnicos in Mexico, the "good guy" characters) as they followed a series of tension-building events, which culminated in a wrestling match or series of matches.

The main event match of the 77th Anniversary Show came about as a result of several concurrent and in some cases unrelated storylines, that amalgamated into one multi-man match on September 4, 2010. The oldest and longest-running storyline leading into the main event began on January 22, 2010, when Místico teamed up with Averno to participate in CMLL's "Torneo Nacional de Pareja Increíbles" ("National Amazing Pairs tournament"), a tournament where CMLL teams up a tecnico (Místico) and a Rudo (Averno) for a tournament. On the night of the tournament, Místico and Averno showed a surprising team unity by wearing outfits that mixed the style of each wrestler. In the second round of the tournament, Místico's attitude seemingly changed as he began attacking his opponent Volador Jr., someone he usually teams with. Místico even went so far as to ripping up Volador's mask, a rudo move, and won the match after an illegal low blow to Volador Jr. After the match Místico took the microphone and claimed that "all was fair in war and defending Mexico City", a comment that drew a lot of boos from the crowd. Subsequently Volador Jr. defeated Místico to win the Mexican National Light Heavyweight Championship as Místico continued to skirt the tecnico/rudo divide. Later a few months later Místico returned to the tecnico side, with the storyline between Místico and Volador Jr. downplayed for the time being. At the 2010 Sin Salida, it looked like the feud was reignited as Volador Jr. began showing rudo traits, especially when wrestling against Místico, but once again the storyline was subsequently downplayed. After teasing a rudo turn for over a month Volador Jr. and La Sombra lost the CMLL World Tag Team Championship to Los Invasores without any obvious signs of dissention between the two. During a later show Volador Jr. finally turned rudo when he attacked La Sombra, tore his former partner's mask off and beat him up. Volador Jr. sided with Los Hijos del Averno, especially Averno, Mephisto and Ephesto who were all included in the cage match along with Volador Jr., La Sombra and Místico Over the summer of 2010, La Sombra traveled to Japan to participate in New Japan Pro-Wrestling's 2010 Best of the Super Juniors tournament. During the tournament La Sombra defeated Jushin Thunder Liger, scoring an upset over the veteran. In July 2010 Liger came to Mexico to tour with CMLL, teasing a rematch with La Sombra. In August 2010 both Liger and La Sombra qualified for the finals of the 2010 Universal Championship tournament, marking the first time the two had faced off in singles competition since the BOSJ. Liger got revenge for his BOSJ loss against La Sombra when he, with help from Okumura at ringside, defeated La Sombra to claim the tournament trophy. In the week following his Universal Championship victory Liger was added to the steel cage match.

Another major storyline that led up to the cage match was the Los Invasores, a group of former AAA wrestlers "invading" CMLL. It began on April 12, 2010 when a contingent of former AAA wrestlers including Psicosis II, Histeria, Maniaco, El Alebrije and Cuije appeared during a CMLL (CMLL) show in Puebla, Puebla. The group drown into the arena in a black SUV and attacked La Sombra, El Hijo del Fantasma and La Máscara after they just finished a match. In subsequent weeks Los Invasores struck again and again, expanding the group with Universo 2000 and Máscara Año 2000, Mr. Águila, Olímpico, Monster, El Oriental and Héctor Garza. During the Promociones Gutiérrez 1st Anniversary Show Místico defeated El Oriental in a match under Lucha de Apuestas, mask vs. mask, rules and forced him to unmask. At the following week's Super Viernes show Místico held El Oriental's mask as a trophy, something which Invasor Psicosis II did not take too kindly to, setting off a feud between the two wrestlers. The Místico vs. Psicosis II storyline was rumored to be the main event of the 77th Anniversary show, but instead they ended up as two of the 14 men in the cage.

Olímpico returned to CMLL in June 2010 as part of Los Invasores, even though he never worked for AAA. On June 7, during the Promociones Gutiérrez 1st Anniversary Show Olímpico teamed up with his former Los Guerreros del Atlantida partner Atlantis for the main event. Subsequently, Olímpico began teaming with both Atlantis and Último Guerrero again for a number of matches. During a trios tournament on the August 13, 2010 Super Viernes Olímpico caused his team to be disqualified and then attacked his former teammates, ending their tentative relationship. As a result of his actions after the match Olímpico, Último Guerrero and Atlantis were all added to the main event of the 77th Anniversary Show.

== Results ==
No.	Results	Stipulations	Times
1	Dark Ángel, Luna Mágica and Marcela defeated La Amapola, Princesa Blanca and Princesa Sugey	Best two out of three falls Six-man tag team match	10:03
2	Ángel de Oro, Delta and Stuka Jr. defeated Los Guerreros Tuareg (Arkangel de la Muerte and Skándalo) and Pólvora	Best two out of three falls Six-man tag team match	15:33
3	Blue Panther, La Máscara and Máscara Dorada defeated Poder Mexica (Dragón Rojo Jr., Misterioso II and Sangre Azteca)	Best two out of three falls Six-man tag team match	17:42
4	La Peste Negra (Negro Casas, El Felino and Rey Bucanero) defeated Los Invasores (Charly Manson, Mr. Águila and Héctor Garza)	Best two out of three falls Six-man tag team match	11:10
5	La Sombra defeated Olímpico; Also in the match: Místico, Volador Jr., Averno, Mephisto, Ephesto, Jushin Thunder Liger, Último Guerrero, Atlantis, Mr. Niebla, El Alebrije, Histeria and Psicosis	14-man elimination steel cage match	33:50
