= Mr. Niebla =

Mexican professional wrestler (1973–2019)

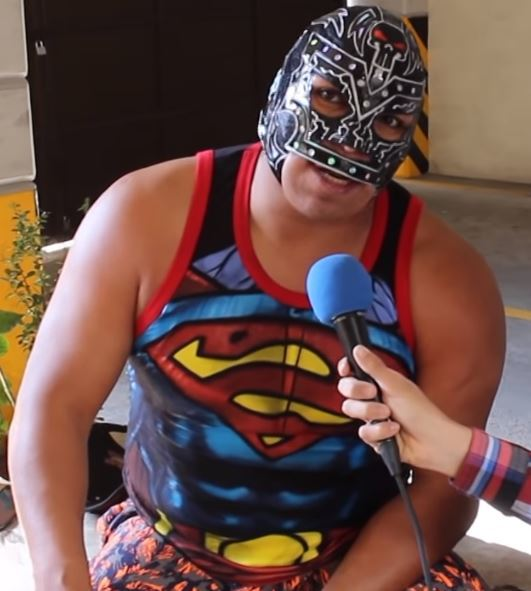
- Mr. Niebla in 2015

Personal information
- Born: Efrén Tiburcio Márquez; February 22, 1973 Mexico City, Mexico
- Died: December 23, 2019 (aged 46) Mexico City, Mexico
- Cause of death: Septic arthritis
- Spouse: Mariela Rodríguez
- Children: 2 (son and daughter)
- Parent: Paulino Tiburcio (father)

Professional wrestling career
- Ring names: Batman; Chamaco Audaz; Chico Veloz; El Marquez; El Pupilo; Mr. Niebla; Shadow 2000
- Billed height: 1.78 m (5 ft 10 in)
- Billed weight: 98 kg (216 lb)
- Billed from: Gómez Palacio, Durango
- Trained by: Scaramouche I; Chaparrito de Oro
- Debut: November 11, 1990

Efrén Tiburcio Márquez (February 22, 1973 – December 23, 2019), better known under the ring name Mr. Niebla (Spanish for "Mr. Fog") was a Mexican professional wrestler best known for his work with Consejo Mundial de Lucha Libre (CMLL) from 1995 until 2007, and again from 2008 until his death in 2019. In between, he worked for rival promotion AAA, where he was part of the stable Los Vipers.

Mr. Niebla's in-ring style focused more on comedy, which often included pratfalls (a form of physical comedy based on falling on the buttocks), dancing and mocking his opponents during matches. Alongside Negro Casas, he was a founding member of the group La Peste Negra ("The Black Plague"), which also included El Felino and Bárbaro Cavernario. Mr. Niebla won several championships in CMLL, including the CMLL World Heavyweight Championship, Mexican National Trios Championship, CMLL World Tag Team Championship and CMLL World Trios Championship. He also won several tournaments, including the Torneo Gran Alternativa, Torneo Nacional de Parejas Increíbles and Leyenda de Azul. He also wrestled in Japan for New Japan Pro-Wrestling (NJPW).

== Professional wrestling career ==
Márquez made his professional wrestling debut on November 11, 1990, under the ring name Chamaco Audaz ("The Audacious Kid"). Eventually, he worked under various ring names and masks as El Pupilo ("The Pupil"), El Marquez, Shadow 2000, Chico Veloz ("Fast Boy") and even "Batman" for a brief period. In March 1992, he came up with the name "Mr. Niebla", which he used for the rest of his career, subsequently earning the nickname El Caballero del Estilo Diferente ("The Gentleman of the Different Style").

=== Consejo Mundial de Lucha Libre (1995–2007) ===
Mr. Niebla began working for Mexico's largest professional wrestling promotion, Consejo Mundial de Lucha Libre (CMLL), in 1995, initially for one of the local CMLL-affiliates, winning both the Distrito Federal Welterweight Championship and Distrito Federal Tag Team Championship. On November 15, 1996, he was paired with Héctor Garza for the Torneo Gran Alternativa ("Great Alternative Tournament"), losing in the finals to Emilio Charles Jr. and Rey Bucanero. In 1997, Mr. Niebla formed a trio with fellow técnicos ("good guys") Lizmark and Atlantis called La Ola Azul ("The Blue Wave"), defeating Bucanero, Charles and El Satánico to win the CMLL World Trios Championship on April 29. On January 23, 1998, Mr. Niebla and Shocker defeated Charles and Dr. Wagner Jr. for the CMLL World Tag Team Championship. However, in October, Mr. Niebla suffered a severe injury during a match that forced him to vacate both championships.

In early 1998, a International Wrestling Revolution Group (IWRG) wrestler began working as "Mr. Niebla", adopting the same style mask and trunks as the original. IWRG clarified that the original Mr. Niebla did not hold the naming rights, and permission was given by a trainer for the impostor to use the name; CMLL brought in the second Mr. Niebla to wrestle as the original was injured. When the original Mr. Niebla returned to the ring, he immediately attacked the impostor, eventually defeating him in a mask vs. mask Lucha de Apuestas ("bet match") for the name rights, forcing the impostor to unmask and change his name to Mr. Mexico. On September 24, 1999, at the CMLL 66th Anniversary Show, Mr. Niebla and Shocker faced Atlantis and Villano III in a Relevos Suicidas, where the losing team would fight each other for their mask. After Atlantis and Villano III defeated them, Mr. Niebla defeated Shocker to unmask him. On March 30, 2001, Mr. Niebla, Olímpico and Safari defeated Blue Panther, El Signo and Fuerza Guerrera to win the Mexican National Trios Championship, but lost it to Los Infernales (Satanico, Averno and Mephisto) on June 23, 2002.

The week prior, Mr. Niebla, Atlantis and Black Warrior won the CMLL World Trios Championship from Blue Panther, Dr. Wagner Jr. and Guerrera, losing it to Dr. Wagner Jr., Universo 2000 and Black Tiger III on March 31, 2003. The loss was part of a long-running storyline between Mr. Niebla and Universo 2000, who defeated Mr. Niebla the previous year to retain his CMLL World Heavyweight Championship. On April 18, Mr. Niebla defeated Universo 2000 to become the CMLL World Heavyweight Champion. After retaining the title against the likes of Universo 2000, Apolo Dantés, Shocker, Bucanero and Tinieblas Jr., he lost it back to Universo 2000 after 543 days on October 12, 2004. Around late 2006 to early 2007, Mr. Niebla left CMLL; he would later explain the decision to leave as a desire for him not to "go backward" down the rankings of the promotion, stating that he felt he would get better opportunities elsewhere.

=== Asistencia Asesoría y Administración (2007–2008) ===
In late 2007, Mr. Niebla left CMLL and debuted for their main rival, Asistencia Asesoría y Administración (AAA), as a member of the rudo ("bad guy") faction Los Vipers. By early 2008, he began challenging Los Vipers leader Abismo Negro in a series of matches over the leadership. Each time Negro won, however, AAA head booker Joaquín Roldan announced that he did not lead Los Vipers; the rest of the group turned on and ejected him from the group after the second match. The storyline, planned to end in a Lucha de Apuestas between Mr. Niebla and Negro at Triplemanía XVI, was changed to a multi-man steel cage match including Negro and all of Los Vipers (Mr. Niebla, Black Abyss, Histeria and Psicosis II), with the last person in the cage being forced to unmask. A few days prior, the match was cancelled after Negro sustained a neck injury. On the night of Triplemanía, Mr. Niebla quit AAA, opting to return to CMLL since Negro's injury caused a major mask vs. mask match he was promised to fall through, and that he came back to CMLL looking to make his mark unmasking a "big name" like Dr. Wagner Jr. or Místico. He also apologized to AAA if they were unhappy with the method he used, but he believed he handled everything in a professional manner and that he was upfront about his ambitions for a "big name" mask vs. mask match.

=== Return to CMLL (2008–2019) ===
Upon his CMLL return in July 2008, Mr. Niebla formed a rudo group with a less serious and more comical approach to wrestling, La Peste Negra ("The Black Plague"), with Negro Casas and Heavy Metal. They wore large afro wigs, painted their faces black and danced during their entrances. The following year, now-rudo El Felino and his wife Princesa Blanca joined La Peste Negra, while Heavy Metal, not comfortable with working the comedic style, was quietly phased out. Starting in March 2010, Mr. Niebla did not work any matches for three months; by early June, it was announced that he was ready to return to the ring. After making only a few in-ring appearances, Mr. Niebla disappeared from the CMLL booking sheets once again, being replaced by Bucanero. It was later revealed that his body had rejected the implant he had been given during his previous time off, and it had to be replaced, putting him out of action for approximately a month.

On August 16, it was announced that Mr. Niebla would be one of fourteen men putting their mask on the line in a steel cage Lucha de Apuestas in the main event of the CMLL 77th Anniversary Show on September 3. He was the sixth man to leave the cage, keeping his mask safe. On July 29, 2011, Mr. Niebla defeated fifteen other men to win the Leyenda de Azul ("The Blue Legend") tournament. At Homenaje a Dos Leyendas ("Homage to Two Legends") on March 2, 2012, Mr. Niebla and Atlantis defeated Rush and El Terrible to win the Torneo Nacional de Parejas Increíbles ("National Incredible Pairs Tournament"), where rivals teamed together. In late 2012, the long-dormant rivalry between Mr. Niebla and former tag team partner Shocker was resumed as the two began working on opposite sides, leading to their participation in the Torneo Nacional de Parejas Increíbles on March 1, 2013. They defeated Kraneo and Marco Corleone and Máscara Dorada and Mephisto to qualify for the semi-finals, where they lost to La Sombra and Volador Jr.; both men then argued and almost came to blows over who was responsible for the loss.

In January 2014, Mr. Niebla introduced new Peste Negra members Bárbaro Cavernario and Herodes Jr. On February 14, he and Cavernario defeated Soberano Jr. and Volador Jr. to win the Torneo Gran Alternativa. Four days later, he, Casas and El Felino defeated La Máscara, Rush and Titán for the Mexican National Trios Championship. Mr. Niebla departed CMLL in February 2015, but returned on April 5. On April 26, La Peste Negra lost the championship to Los Reyes de la Atlantida (Atlantis, Delta and Guerrero Maya Jr.). They lost to Dragon Lee, Místico and Valiente at the CMLL 82nd Anniversary Show on September 18. For the Torneo Gran Alternativa on March 29, 2016, Mr. Niebla and rookie Warrior Steel lost to Rush and Golden Magic in the first round. Mr. Niebla was also programmed with Volador Jr. in a feud that saw them team for the Torneo Nacional de Parejas Increíbles on April 15, defeating Blue Panther and Ephesto in the first round and Bobby Z and Dorada in the quarter-finals, before losing to Mephisto and Místico in the semi-finals. On June 6, 2017, Mr. Niebla participated in a torneo cibernetico for the vacant CMLL World Heavyweight Championship, eliminating La Bestia del Ring before being eliminated by eventual winner Corleone. On February 9, 2018, Mr. Niebla and Atlantis were paired for that year's Torneo Nacional de Parejas Increíbles, overcoming Ángel de Oro and El Cuatrero before losing to Rush and El Terrible. Mr. Niebla was suspended by CMLL after working a match in August he was clearly not in any condition to wrestle in, but returned on March 12, 2019.

=== New Japan Pro-Wrestling (2015) ===
In January 2015, Mr. Niebla made his New Japan Pro-Wrestling (NJPW) debut, working the Fantastica Mania 2015 tour co-produced by CMLL and NJPW. However, he did not wrestle on the last two stops of the tour. According to the Wrestling Observer Newsletter, Niebla disappeared on the third night and was found passed out in his hotel room the following morning, after which he was rushed to a local hospital for the next three days. NJPW, reportedly furious at the event, made CMLL pay for the hospital bill, causing them to fire Niebla after his return to Mexico.

== Personal life ==
Efrén Tiburcio Márquez was born on February 22, 1973, the son of Paulino Tiburcio. He later married Mariela Rodríguez, and together the couple have a son and a daughter. At one point, his son was training for a professional wrestling career, but did not complete his training.

Mr. Niebla publicly acknowledged that he was an alcoholic in a 2018 interview, stating that his drinking problem had cost him a lot over the years in regards to his career and prosperity. In the same interview, he claimed that he was not a "drunken fighter" notwithstanding his alcoholism. Notwithstanding Mr. Niebla's claims, there were incidents over the years where he was wrestling despite being in no condition to perform. During the Fantastica Mania 2015 tour in Japan, Mr. Niebla was taken off the shows and later had to be hospitalized, after which CMLL fired him. He was later rehired by CMLL. On August 28, 2018, Mr. Niebla worked a Tuesday night show for CMLL where he was visibly impaired, falling off the ropes during his entrance. He was not involved in the first fall, while a visibly upset Volador Jr. removed Mr. Niebla's mask at the beginning of the second fall to draw a disqualification. Volador Jr. left the ring before the announcement was made. Mr. Niebla subsequently stated he was injured and the swift conclusion was to shield those in the ring from further problems. After the incident, CMLL announced that Mr. Niebla had been removed from the CMLL 85th Anniversary Show, followed by the Mexico City wrestling commission announcing that they had indefinitely suspended his wrestling license. Prior to his CMLL return in 2019, CMLL officials informed him that he would be fired if he worked drunk again.

== Death and legacy ==
Mr. Niebla died from complications of a septic arthritis on December 23, 2019. CMLL had announced that they were holding a benefit show for Mr. Niebla on January 4 to help pay for his latest medical expenses, but with his death, it became a tribute show, El Ultimo Vuelo del Rey del Guaguanco ("The last flight of the King of Guaguanco"), with the money collected going to his family. As part of the show, Drone won the Copa Mr. Niebla trophy. Micro-Estrella Zacarias, who often accompanied Mr. Niebla to the ring, worked as a small version of Mr. Niebla instead of his normal mask and outfit. CMLL also announced that they were holding a special show, La Noche de Mr. Niebla, on January 24.

== Name confusion ==
Over the years at least four different wrestlers have used the ring name "Mr. Niebla":

- Guadalupe Tovar Hernández (1938–2014) — the first wrestler to use the name
- José Guadalupe Gutiérrez Álvarez (1949–2017) — wrestled as "Mr. Niebla" from 1978 to 1994
- Efrén Tiburcio Márquez (1973–2019) — wrestled as "Mr. Niebla" from 1992 to 2019
- Miguel Ángel Guzmán Velázquez (b. 1970) — wrestled as "Mr. Niebla" from 1998 to 1999

== Championships and accomplishments ==
- Consejo Mundial de Lucha Libre
  - CMLL World Heavyweight Championship (1 time)
  - CMLL World Tag Team Championship (1 time) – with Shocker
  - CMLL World Trios Championship (2 times) – with Atlantis and Lizmark, Atlantis and Black Warrior
  - Carnaval Increible Tournament (2000) – with Último Guerrero and Rey Bucanero
  - CMLL Torneo Gran Alternativa (2014) – with Bárbaro Cavernario
  - CMLL Torneo Nacional de Parejas Increíbles (2012) – with Atlantis
  - Salvador Lutteroth Singles Tournament (1998)
  - Mexican National Trios Championship (2 times) – with Safari and Olímpico (1), and El Felino and Negro Casas (1)
  - Distrito Federal Welterweight Championship (1 time)
  - Distrito Federal Tag Team Championship (1 time) – unknown partner
  - Leyenda de Azul (2011)
- International Wrestling Revolution Group
  - Copa Higher Power (1998) – with El Pantera, Shocker, El Solar, Star Boy, and Mike Segura
- Pro Wrestling Illustrated
  - PWI ranked him #208 of the top 500 singles wrestlers in the PWI 500 in 2010
- Other promotions
  - WFS Tag Team Championship (1 time) – with Vertigo

== Luchas de Apuestas record ==
Winner (wager)	Loser (wager)	Location	Event	Date	Notes
Mr. Niebla (mask)	MS-1 (hair)	Mexico City	Live event	N/A	
Mr. Niebla (mask)	Bestia Negra (hair)	Mexico City	Live event	N/A	
Mr. Niebla (mask)	Popitekus (hair)	Mexico City	Live event	N/A	
Mr. Niebla (mask)	Estrella de Plata (mask)	Mexico City	Live event	March 20, 1995	
Mr. Niebla (mask)	Súper Brazo (mask)	Naucalpan, Mexico State	Live event	July 16, 1995	
Mr. Niebla (mask)	Ébola (mask)	Naucalpan, Mexico State	Live event	1996	
Mr. Niebla (mask)	Cavernícola II (hair)	Naucalpan, Mexico State	Live event	February 2, 1996	(Note: Finals of a campal de la muerte tournament where the loser of the final loses his hair or mask.)
Mr. Niebla (mask, name)	Mr. Niebla II (mask, name)	Mexico City	Live event	August 20, 1999	
Mr. Niebla (mask)	Shocker (mask)	Mexico City	CMLL 66th Anniversary Show	September 24, 1999	(Note: Lost a Relevos suicida match: Atlantis and Villano III defeated the team to force them to fight for their mask.)
Mr. Niebla (mask)	Lizmark Jr. (hair)	Juárez, Chihuahua	CMLL show	July 20, 2019	(Note: The two lost a triangle Relevos Suicida match to the teams of Volador Jr. and Místico, Euforia and Gran Guerrero; were forced to wrestle each other as a result.)
