= Rey Bucanero =

Mexican professional wrestler

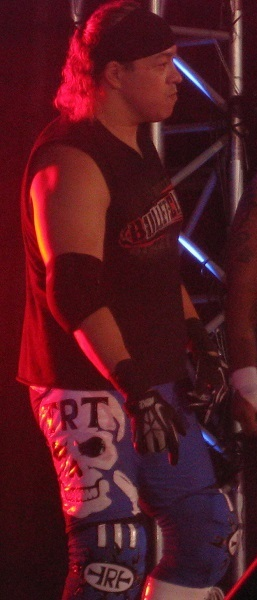
- Rey Bucanero on his way to the ring, September 2013.

Personal information
- Born: Arturo García Ortiz; July 19, 1974 (age 52) Mexico City, Distrito Federal

Professional wrestling career
- Ring name(s): El Hijo del Pirata Morgan; Rey Bucanero; Rey Bucanero, Jr. Rey "Pirata" Ortiz
- Billed height: 1.78 m (5 ft 10 in)
- Billed weight: 94 kg (207 lb)
- Billed from: Mexico City, Mexico
- Trained by: Pirata Morgan; Hombre Bala; Verdugo; El Satánico; Franco Colombo
- Debut: November 18, 1991

Arturo García Ortiz (born July 19, 1974), better known under the ring name Rey Bucanero, is a Mexican professional wrestler. He is best known for his time in Consejo Mundial de Lucha Libre (CMLL) from 1992 to 2026. His ring name is Spanish for "Buccaneer King", which was originally reflected in his mask that featured a skull face and an eye patch. Ortiz was unmasked in 1999 and has worked unmasked ever since.

He is the nephew of Pirata Morgan, from whom he took the Pirate character, as well as the nephew of Hombre Bala and El Verdungo. While he has primarily worked for CMLL for most of his career, he has made appearances in the United States, most notably for the World Wrestling Federation (WWF) and Total Nonstop Action Wrestling (TNA), as well as in Japan for New Japan Pro-Wrestling (NJPW).

Rey Bucanero, along with Último Guerrero and Tarzan Boy, were the founders of the long running Los Guerreros del Infierno ("The Infernal Warriors") group in 2001. Bucanero later left the group to become a member of La Peste Negra and eventually help found La Fuerza TRT with El Terrible and El Texano Jr., as well as the trio TGR (Terriblemente Guapo el Rey, "Terribly Handsome King"; with El Terrible and Shocker). For the majority of the first decade of the 21st century, Bucanero and Guerrero formed a very popular and successful tag team that was voted "Best Tag Team of the Decade (2000–2009)" in the Wrestling Observer Newsletter awards.

In CMLL, Bucanero has held the CMLL World Tag Team Championship four times, the NWA World Historic Light Heavyweight Championship twice, and the CMLL World Light Heavyweight Championship and CMLL World Trios Championship once. He has also won CMLL's Torneo Gran Alternativa and Leyenda de Azul tournaments.

== Personal life ==
Arturo García Ortiz was born on July 19, 1974, in Mexico City. Three of Ortiz's uncles were professional wrestlers and often took him to wrestling shows when he was younger. He is the nephew of Aurelio Ortiz (better known under the ring names Hombre Bala and later "The Monster"), Pedro Ortiz (best known as Pirata Morgan) and Francisco Ortiz (best known under the name "El Verdungo"), all of whom inspired him to become a wrestler. García is the cousin of professional wrestlers El Hijo de Pirata Morgan (Antheus Ortiz Chávez), Pirata Morgan Jr. (real name not revealed), Hombre Bala Jr. (real name not revealed) and the most recent wrestler to work as "The Monster" (real name not revealed). García moved in with his uncle Pedro Ortiz when his parents divorced. From that point on, his uncle brought him to Arena México, the home of Empresa Mexicana de Lucha Libre (EMLL), for whom Ortiz worked at the time. While spending time backstage, he would be introduced to the other side of professional wrestling, being trained from a very early age by all three of his uncles.

Ortiz was formerly married to fellow wrestler La Diabólica. They divorced in 2007 following an incident concerning the custody of their children. A son of theirs' wrestles with a combination of his parents names as Rey Diablo.

== Professional wrestling career ==
Ortiz made his in-ring debut on November 18, 1991, at the age of 17, as the wrestling masked character "Rey Bucanero Jr." ("Buccaneer King Jr."). Records are unclear if there was a wrestler known as "Rey Bucanero".

=== Consejo Mundial de Lucha Libre (1992–2026) ===
==== Early years (1992–1999) ====
After initially working for the Universal Wrestling Federation (UWF) in Japan, he made his debut for Consejo Mundial de Lucha Libre (CMLL) on September 20, 1992, teaming with El Acma in a loss to Olímpico and Olímpus. He performed as "Rey Bucanero Jr." until 1994, working primarily smaller shows in Puebla and other smaller venues. In 1995, he briefly wrestled as "El Hijo de Pirata Morgan" and "Pirata Morgan Jr.", but that stint did not last long, leaving those names behind him in case his uncle Pedro Ortiz's sons wanted to follow in his footsteps when they got older and wanted to wrestle as Pirata Morgan Jr. and El Hijo de Pirata Morgan; he instead shortened his ring name to "Rey Bucanero".

In 1996, CMLL paired Bucanero with Emilio Charles Jr. for that year's Torneo Gran Alternativa ("Great Alternative Tournament"), in which a rookie teams with a more experienced wrestler. The duo was victorious, defeating Héctor Garza and Mr. Niebla in the finals. They were subsequently joined by El Satánico and, at Homenaje a Salvador Lutteroth ("Homage to Salvador Lutteroth") on March 21, 1997, the trio defeated Apolo Dantés, Black Warrior and Dr. Wagner Jr. in a tournament to win the vacant CMLL World Trios Championship. Their reign only lasted 39 days, as they lost the championship to Atlantis, Lizmark and Mr. Niebla on April 29. On July 17, 1999, he was one of eight competitors in a Ruleta de la Muerte ("Roulette of Death") or "losers advance" tournament. After losing the first two matches, he faced Shocker in the finals, with both wrestlers putting their mask on the line under Lucha de Apuestas ("bet match") rules. Shocker pinned Rey Bucanero, forcing him to remove his mask and never wear it again.

==== Los Infernales (1999–2001) ====
In 1999, El Satánico reformed the group Los Infernales, recruiting Bucanero and Último Guerrero; Rey's uncle Pirata Morgan had been part of the original Los Infernales. In the summer of 2000, he and Guerrero outlasted sixteen teams in a tournament to win the vacant CMLL World Tag Team Championship, lastly defeating Villano IV and Mr. Niebla. At the same time, Satánico had been working a storyline against Tarzan Boy, which was used to turn both Bucanero and Guerrero against Satánico. Bucanero, Guerrero and Tarzan Boy claimed that they deserved the name Los Infernales and that Satánico was holding them back. In response, Satánico recruited two other wrestlers to even the numbers, which on TV was presented as if he used his "Satanic powers" to turn wrestler Rencor Latino into Averno ("Hell") and Astro Rey Jr. into a character known as Mephisto. When Tarzan Boy was injured and unable to wrestle, Bucanero and Guerrero recruited Máscara Mágica to even the numbers. The storyline between the two factions reached its high point at the CMLL 68th Anniversary Show on September 28, 2001, where all seven wrestlers faced off in a steel cage match. The stipulation of the match was that the winning side would gain the rights to use the name Los Infernales, while the loser on the opposite side would be forced to unmask or have their hair shaved off. In the end, El Satánico pinned Máscara Mágica, forcing him to unmask. After losing the match, Guerrero, Bucanero and Tarzan Boy became known collectively as Los Guerreros del Infierno ("The Infernal Soldiers").

==== Los Guerreros del Infierno (2001–2010) ====
Bucanero and Guerrero entered their next feud with Negro Casas and El Hijo del Santo over the CMLL World Tag Team Championship. After a match with an inconclusive finish in October, Los Guerreros lost to Santo and Casas on November 2, 2001. On May 31, 2002, Guerrero and Bucanero regained their tag team title from Santo and Casas, becoming three-time champions. Los Guerreros del Infierno then began feuding with Vampiro Canadiense and Shocker, whom they successfully defended their title against; however, Bucanero lost his hair to Vampiro in a Luchas de Apuestas in December. In 2003, they retained the championship against Vampiro and Lizmark Jr. and Casas and Perro Aguayo Jr., but were defeated in December by the team of Shocker and the newly arrived L.A. Park. Los Guerreros regained the tag team championship in early 2004, but Bucanero suffered a knee injury and was temporarily replaced by Black Warrior; Los Guerreros lost the tag team title to Atlantis and Blue Panther on June 25.

Bucanero and new Los Guerreros member Olímpico challenged Atlantis and Panther for the title at the first Arena México show of 2005, but lost when Olímpico injured his neck while attempting a dive. After Atlantis turned heel and joined the group, they became known as Los Guerreros de la Atlántida; it was teased that Bucanero would break up with Guerrero, but Bucanero stayed with the group and Los Guerreros feuded with Perro Aguayo Jr.'s Los Perros del Mal faction into 2006. At the end of April, he teamed with Tarzan Boy to win a double hair vs. hair match against Mr. Águila and Damián 666 in the main event of 50. Aniversario de Arena México. The following week, he and Atlantis lost to Último Dragón and Keiji Mutoh after Atlantis hit Bucanero by accident. In the following weeks, Bucanero kept having trouble with his teammates, and magazines hinted at a possible face turn. Later that month, Averno and Mephisto turned on him during a match, which Tarzan Boy and Guerrero also did shortly after, ripping his tights and signifying he was no longer a member of Los Guerreros. On July 14, he defeated Guerrero for his CMLL World Light Heavyweight Championship, ending Guerrero's three-and-a-half-year title reign. By early 2010, Bucanero returned to Los Guerreros del Atlantida.

==== La Peste Negra (2010–2011) ====
In July and August 2010, Rey Bucanero filled in for Mr. Niebla while he was out with a knee injury and teamed up with La Peste Negra ("The Black Plague") members Negro Casas and El Felino. When he began teaming with La Peste Negra, Bucanero wore ring gear that looked more like Jack Sparrow from the Pirates of the Caribbean movie series and less like his fellow Guerreros de la Atlantida members. He was also given a mascot, a Mini-Estrella wearing a parrot outfit that accompanied him to the ring, which was later named Zacarias. In August, Bucanero announced that he had left Los Guerreros and joined La Peste Negra because Los Guerreros were more interested in teaming with Olímpico than him. On December 3, at Sin Piedad ("No Mercy"), Bucanero defeated Los Invasores ("The Invaders") leader Mr. Águila in a Lucha de Apuestas, forcing Mr. Águila to have his orange mohawk shaved off. On January 29, 2011, Bucanero lost to Mr. Águila at a show for American promotion Pro Wrestling Guerrilla (PWG), during the WrestleReunion 5 weekend.

==== TRT / TGR (2011–2018) ====
In April 2011, Bucanero left La Peste Negra to form a new group with El Texano Jr. and El Terrible, abandoning Zacarias in the process. The following month, the group was named La Fuerza TRT. On June 21, Bucanero defeated El Hijo del Fantasma to win the NWA World Historic Light Heavyweight Championship. At the CMLL 78th Anniversary Show on September 30, Bucanero took part in a ten-man hair vs. hair steel cage match, which came down to Bucanero and former Peste Negra partner El Felino. In the end, El Felino managed to pin Bucanero, forcing Bucanero to have all his hair shaved off. When El Texano Jr. left CMLL in late November, Bucanero and El Terrible chose Tiger as the new third member of La Fuerza TRT. On June 4, 2013, Bucanero's near two-year reign as the NWA World Historic Light Heavyweight Champion ended, losing the title to Diamante Azul. Bucanero and Terrible removed Tiger from the La Fuerza TRT group on August 11, replacing him with Vangelis. The stable was subsequently renamed TRT: La Máquina de la Destrucción ("TRT: The Machine of Destruction"). Soon after, Bucanero and Tama Tonga began teaming with El Terrible as "Bullet Club Latinoamerica". On October 18, Bucanero was sidelined with an injury, and both he and Tonga were stripped of the CMLL World Tag Team Championship, which they had won in Japan.

On March 8, 2015, Bucanero defeated La Sombra in a tournament final to win the NWA World Historic Light Heavyweight Championship for the second time. On April 3, Bucanero, El Terrible and Shocker formed a new trio named TGR (Terriblemente Guapo el Rey, "Terribly Handsome King"). By virtue of holding a CMLL title, Bucanero competed in the Universal Championship tournament on October 2, but lost to Último Guerrero in the first round. He was paired with El Cuatrero for the Torneo Gran Alternativa on March 22, 2016, but lost to Tritón and Místico in the first round. He then feuded with Super Crazy, culminating in a hair vs. hair match at the CMLL 83rd Anniversary Show on September 3, which Bucanero won to force Crazy to be shaved bald. Bucanero participated in that year's Universal Championship tournament on October 21, losing to Atlantis in the first round. On November 1, Bucanero lost his NWA World Historic Light Heavyweight Championship to Hechicero.

Bucanero and Ángel de Oro lost to Carístico and Mephisto in the first round of the Torneo Nacional de Parejas Increíbles on February 10, 2017. He competed in a torneo cibernetico for the vacant CMLL World Heavyweight Championship on June 6, where he eliminated Gran Guerrero before being eliminated by Rush. On August 1, he unsuccessfully challenged Ángel de Oro for the CMLL World Middleweight Championship. On February 2, 2018, Bucanero was paired with then-rival Valiente for that year's Torneo Nacional de Parejas Increíbles, losing to Azul and Pierroth in the first round. He and El Terrible subsequently entered a tournament for the CMLL World Tag Team Championship, defeating the teams of Okumura and Sam Adonis in the first round, Marco Corleone and Niebla Roja in the quarter-finals and Azul and Stuka Jr. in the semi-finals. At Homenaje a Dos Leyendas on March 16, they lost to Valiente and Volador Jr. in the finals. By this time, TRT disbanded as each member had pursued a singles career.

==== Final storylines (2018–2026) ====
On June 19, Bucanero unsuccessfully challenged Atlantis for the Mexican National Light Heavyweight Championship. He was then involved in a feud with Niebla Roja, often cheating to gain supremacy in their rivalry. However, he lost to Roja in a hair vs. hair match on November 18, being shaved bald as a result. For the 2019 Torneo Nacional de Parejas Increíbles, Bucanero was paired with Tritón, being defeated in the first round on April 12 by Sansón and Soberano Jr. At the CMLL 86th Anniversary Show on September 27, Bucanero, Hechicero and El Hijo del Villano III were defeated by Dulce Gardenia, Azul and Titán via disqualification. On November 5, he faced Stuka Jr. for the NWA World Historic Light Heavyweight Championship in a losing effort. On February 24, 2020, he and Drone took part in the Torneo de Parejas Familiares ("Family Team Tournament"), losing to El Cuatrero and Sansón in the quarter-finals. Bucanero and Shocker participated in a tournament for the Mexican National Tag Team Championship on March 6, defeating Audaz and Fugaz in the first round, but lost to El Felino and Tiger in the quarter-finals.

On November 1, 2022, Bucanero participated in a torneo cibernetico to determine the number one contender for the Rey del Inframundo ("King of the Underworld") championship, but was the second wrestler eliminated by El Sagrado. Later that month, on November 25, he was the first wrestler eliminated by Volcano in the Leyenda de Azul ("The Blue Legend") tournament. Bucanero unsuccessfully challenged El Sagrado for the Mexican National Heavyweight Championship on March 6, 2023. During this time, Bucanero continued his long-running feud with El Felino, as the two constantly issued challenges for retirement matches. Their feud culminated in what was their third hair vs. hair match at the CMLL 92nd Anniversary Show on September 19, 2025, where both men fought to a double disqualification, thus forcing both Bucanero and El Felino to be shaved bald as a result. At Homenaje a Dos Leyendas on March 20, 2026, Bucanero was the first wrestler eliminated in a torneo cibernetico for the Copa Infernal. Bucanero wrestled his last match for CMLL in May and announced his departure from the promotion on July 6, ending his 34-year tenure.

=== World Wrestling Federation (1998–1999) ===
In late 1998, Ortiz was one of many Mexican wrestlers who began working for the World Wrestling Federation (WWF, now known as WWE) as part of WWF Super Astros, WWF's attempt at a show to expand into the Latin American markets. There, Ortiz was known under the ring name Rey "Pirata" Ortiz and wrestled without his mask on. He later stated that he wished the WWF had more respect for the mask, but that a paycheck was a paycheck so he did not complain about it. His stint on Super Astros ended in early 1999, with Ortiz scoring his only victory over Pantera on February 28.

=== New Japan Pro-Wrestling (2003, 2013) ===
Rey Bucanero made his debut for New Japan Pro-Wrestling (NJPW) as part of the "Strong Energy" tour in April 2003, teaming with Último Guerrero and facing the likes of Jado & Gedo, AKIRA, Heat and Super Crazy. In August 2013, it was announced that Bucanero would return to NJPW as part of the "Road to Destruction" tour, where he and Bullet Club's Tama Tonga would challenge for the CMLL World Tag Team Championship. He wrestled his first match back in Japan on September 5, teaming with Tonga and his Bullet Club stablemate Karl Anderson in a loss to Jushin Thunder Liger, Manabu Nakanishi and Tiger Mask. On September 4, Bucanero and Tonga defeated Liger and Hiroshi Tanahashi to win the titles. Bucanero's tour of Japan ended at Destruction on September 29, where he, Tonga, Anderson and Bad Luck Fale lost to Captain New Japan, Great Bash Heel (Togi Makabe and Tomoaki Honma) and Máscara Dorada.

=== Total Nonstop Action Wrestling (2008) ===
In 2008, Bucanero participated in Total Nonstop Action Wrestling (TNA)'s World X Cup tournament as part of Team Mexico. On the June 26 episode of Impact!, he and Guerrero defeated Team Japan's Masato Yoshino and Naruki Doi in the first round. The following week, Bucanero defeated Team International's Alex Koslov in the second round. Team Mexico was eliminated in a 12-man elimination match at Victory Road on July 13, however, Volador Jr. won an Ultimate X match later that night, earning enough points for Team Mexico to win the entire tournament, becoming the 2008 World X Cup holders.

=== Chikara (2011, 2018) ===
On July 31, 2011, Bucanero and Atlantis made an appearance for American promotion Chikara, losing to F.I.S.T. ("Friends In Similar Tights"; Chuck Taylor and Johnny Gargano) via disqualification, when Gargano faked taking a low blow from Atlantis. Bucanero returned to Chikara in late 2018 to participate in that year's King of Trios tournament, where he was paired with Jean-Pierre LaFitte and Katarina Leigh as "The Ohnaka Gang", a pirate-based team. They defeated Cajun Crawdad, Hermit Crab and Merlok in the first round, but lost to Adam Hoffman, Jack Bonza and Mick Moretti in the quarter-finals.

=== Ring of Honor (2017–2019) ===
In August 2017, Bucanero participated in the War of the Worlds UK tour, promoted by CMLL, NJPW, Ring of Honor (ROH) and Revolution Pro Wrestling (RevPro). On the first night, he and Guerrero lost to The Addiction (Christopher Daniels and Frankie Kazarian). They then defeated Místico and Titán on the second night and The Briscoes (Jay Briscoe and Mark Briscoe) on the third. Bucanero returned for the Global Wars Espectacular tour on September 6, 2019, where he, Bárbaro Cavernario, Hechicero and Okumura lost to Villain Enterprises (Brody King, Flip Gordon, Marty Scurll and PCO). The next night, he and Hechicero unsuccessfully challenged The Briscoes for the ROH World Tag Team Championship in a three-way match also involving The Bouncers (Brian Milonas and Beer City Bruiser).

== Other media ==
In October 2011, Bucanero was one of four CMLL wrestlers featured in an A&E Latinoamericano documentary series titled El Luchador.

== Championships and accomplishments ==
- Consejo Mundial de Lucha Libre

- CMLL World Light Heavyweight Championship (1 time)
- CMLL World Tag Team Championship (4 times) – with Último Guerrero (3) and Tama Tonga (1)
- CMLL World Trios Championship (1 time) – with El Satánico and Emilio Charles, Jr.
- NWA World Historic Light Heavyweight Championship (2 times)
- Carnaval Incredible Tournament (2000) – with Último Guerrero and Mr. Niebla
- Copa de Arena Mexico (1999) – with El Satánico and Último Guerrero
- Torneo Gran Alternativa (1996 (II)) – with Emilio Charles, Jr.
- Leyenda de Azul: 2006
- Copa Herdez (2010) - with Último Guerrero

- Federación Universitaria de Lucha Libre

- FULL World Championship (1 time)

- International Wrestling Revolution Group

- Copa Higher Power (1999) – with Astro Rey Jr., Máscara Mágica, El Satánico and Último Guerrero

- Pro Wrestling Illustrated

- PWI ranked him #39 of the 500 best singles wrestlers of the PWI 500 in 2005

- Total Nonstop Action Wrestling

- TNA World X Cup (2008) – with Volador Jr., Último Guerrero and Averno

- Wrestling Observer Newsletter awards

- Best Tag Team of the Decade (2000–2009) – with Último Guerrero

== Luchas de Apuestas record ==
Winner (wager)	Loser (wager)	Location	Event	Date	Notes
Rey Bucanero (mask)	Pegasso I (mask)	N/A	Live event	1995	(Note: Not the same wrestler who works as Pegasso in the 21st century.)
Rey Bucanero (mask)	Black Machine (mask)	N/A	Live event	1995	
Shocker (mask)	Rey Bucanero (mask)	Mexico City	Ruleta de la Muerte	July 17, 1999	(Note: This was the finals of a "losers advance" tournament.)
Rey Bucanero (hair)	Brazo de Platino (hair)	Mexico City	Live event	August 22, 2002	
Vampiro Canadiense (hair)	Rey Bucanero (hair)	Mexico City	Sin Piedad	December 13, 2002	
Los Guerreros del Infierno (hair) (Rey Bucanero and Tarzan Boy)	Los Perros del Mal (hair) (Damián 666 and Mr. Águila)	Mexico City	50. Aniversario de Arena México	April 28, 2006	
Rey Bucanero (hair)	Shigeo Okumura (hair)	Mexico City	CMLL show	July 18, 2006	(Note: Match also included Tarzan Boy, El Terrible, Negro Casas, Heavy Metal, Universo 2000 and Máximo)
Rey Bucanero (hair)	Máscara Año 2000 (hair)	León, Guanajuato	Live event	August 7, 2006	
Lizmark Jr. and Shocker (hair)	Rey Bucanero and Black Warrior (hair)	Mexico City	Sin Piedad	December 12, 2007	
Rey Bucanero (hair)	Mr. Águila (hair)	Mexico City	Sin Piedad	December 3, 2010	
El Felino (hair)	Rey Bucanero (hair)	Mexico City	CMLL 78th Anniversary Show	September 30, 2011	(Note: This was a 10-man steel cage match that also included Rush, Mr. Águila, El Terrible, El Texano, Jr., Héctor Garza, Máximo, Blue Panther and Negro Casas.)
Máximo and Volador Jr. (hair)	TRT: La Máquina de la Destrucción (hair) (El Terrible and Rey Bucanero)	Mexico City	Homenaje a Dos Leyendas	March 20, 2015	
Rey Bucanero (hair)	Super Crazy (hair)	Mexico City	CMLL 83rd Anniversary Show	September 2, 2016	
Niebla Roja (hair)	Rey Bucanero (hair)	Mexico City	Domingo Arena Mexico	November 18, 2018	
	Rey Bucanero (hair) and Felino (hair)	Mexico City	CMLL 92nd Anniversary Show	September 19, 2025	(Note: The match ended in a double disqualification, thus both men got their head shaved.)
