= Olímpico =

Mexican professional wrestler

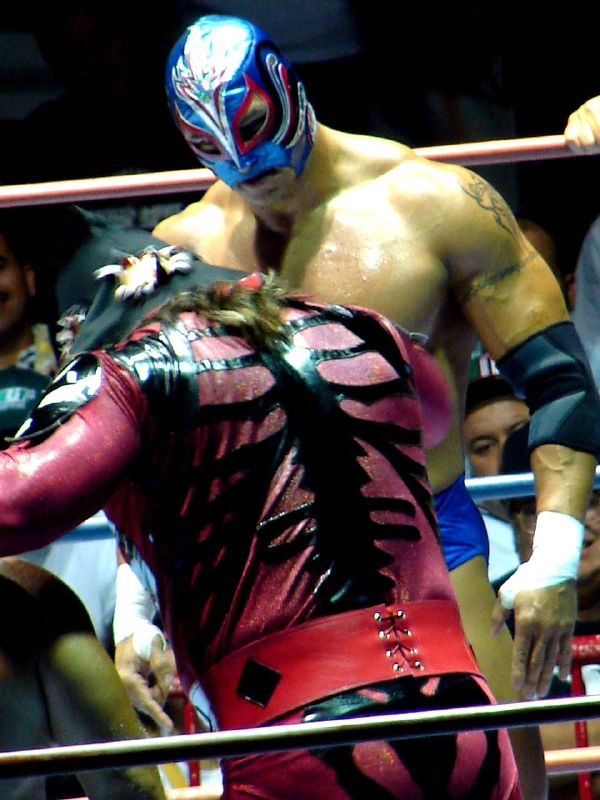
- Olímpico (before he was unmasked) against Super Parka (with his back turned)

Personal information
- Born: Joel Bernal Galicia; December 6, 1965 (age 60) Mexico City, Mexico

Professional wrestling career
- Ring names: Olímpico; Popoca, Jr.; Super Popular
- Billed height: 1.80 m (5 ft 11 in)
- Billed weight: 92 kg (203 lb)
- Billed from: Mexico City, Mexico
- Trained by: Roy Aguirre; Franco Colombo; Hijo del Gladiador
- Debut: September 1992
- Retired: September 4, 2020

Joel Bernal Galicia (born December 6, 1965) is a Mexican retired professional wrestler, better known under the ring name Olímpico. Olímpico is sometimes Anglicised as "Olympico", and means "Olympian" in Spanish. From his debut in 1992 until late 2008 Olímpico worked for Consejo Mundial de Lucha Libre (CMLL); since then he has worked for promotions including Perros del Mal, International Wrestling Revolution Group (IWRG), World Wrestling Association (WWA) and other promotions on the Mexican independent circuit before returning to CMLL in mid-2010 as part of Los Invasores. For many years Olimpico's real name was not a matter of public record, as is often the case with masked wrestlers in Mexico where their private lives are kept a secret from the wrestling fans. He was unmasked on September 3, 2010, and had to reveal his real name as is traditional.

== Professional wrestling career ==
=== Consejo Mundial de Lucha Libre (1992–2008) ===
Bernal Galicia grew up watching his father, Roy Aguirre, wrestle and wanted to follow in his father's footsteps. After training with his father he made his professional wrestling debut in Mexico City, Mexico for Consejo Mundial de Lucha Libre (CMLL). It was rare for CMLL to have a wrestler actually made his debut on in their "home venue", but they were in need of young talent after a large number of young wrestlers had left CMLL for rival promotion Asistencia Asesoría y Administración (AAA) in early 1992. In his first match he used the ring name Popoca, Jr. but after the match it was decided that he needed a different ring persona. CMLL owner Paco Alonso came up with the concept of "Olímpico", "the Olympian", inspired by the 1992 Summer Olympics in Barcelona, Spain. (Note: Another luchador - Julio Díaz Adame - used the "El Olímpico" name in EMLL prior to Galicia, having debuted in 1970s and seemingly retired by 1988 (before Galicia even began wrestling himself)) Olímpico wore a white mask with the Olympic Rings on it, a white Olympic wrestling style singlet and white boots. Later on he changed the Olympic rings to five lines with the colors of the Olympic rings as CMLL had not gotten permission to use the official Olympic symbol. Initially Olímpico worked in the first and second matches of the show, improving his skills while continuing to train under Hijo del Gladiador at the CMLL Gym. In 1996 he was given a chance to stand out from the other low card wrestlers when he was placed in a storyline feud with Damián El Guerrero. The feud saw Olímpico win his first Luchas de Apuestas match (a "bet match" where both competitors put their mask on the line), unmasking Damián El Guerrero.

On September 16, 1998, Olímpico won the CMLL World Welterweight Championship from Karlof Lagarde, Jr., the first singles title of his career. On October 23, 1998, Olímpico headlined his first CMLL show, losing the CMLL Welterweight title to Halcón Negro. A week later Olímpico once again faced Halcón Negro in the main event, this time defeating Negro in a Luchas de Apuesta, winning the mask of his opponent. On February 27, 1999, Olímpico made his first trip to Japan, losing the CMLL Welterweight title to Super Delfin. Back in Mexico Olímpico worked a feud against Rey Bucanero, a feud that involved mask ripping every time the two were in the same ring, building to a Luchas de Apuesta between the two. The match never happened however; instead Rey Bucanero lost his mask to Shocker leaving the Olímpico / Bucanero storyline unfinished. On March 30, 2000, Olímpico, Mr. Niebla, and Safari defeated the team of Blue Panther, Fuerza Guerrera, and El Signo to win the Mexican National Trios Championship. In 2002, CMLL decided to create a Mini-Estrella version of Olímpico called Pequeño Olímpico, a short wrestler who wore an outfit patterned after Olímpico's outfit at the time. On June 23, 2003, Olímpico, Mr. Niebla, and Safari lost the Trios title to Los Nuevo Infernales, the team of Averno, Mephisto, and Satánico. After working as a tecnico (a good guy character, called a face in wrestling) since 1992, Olímpico turned rudo (villain or Heel) on February 20, 2004 as he turned on his tag team partners El Felino and Virus during a match, allowing the team of Zumbido, Violencia and Veneno to win the match. Following his turn he joined a group called Los Guerreros del Infierno with Último Guerrero, Rey Bucanero, and Tarzan Boy. While his rudo turn was surprising, it was soon overshadowed when Atlantis turned rudo and joined Los Guerreros in early 2005, relegating Olímpico to the secondary trios teams, working with Tarzan Boy and other Los Guerrero's associates while the team Último Guerrero, Rey Bucanero, and Atlantis was the main Guerreros del Infierno team. On September 30, 2005, Olímpico and Atlantis were chosen to challenge Hiroshi Tanahashi and Shinsuke Nakamura for the IWGP Tag Team Championship, when the Japanese duo made a trip to Mexico; Tanahashi and Nakamura successfully defended the title. Over the next three years Olímpico worked the semi-main and sometimes main event Trios matches but never got the "big" match or won any championships.

=== Independent circuit (2008–2010) ===
In late 2008 Perro Aguayo, Jr. and his group Los Perros del Mal left CMLL, citing their unhappiness with their position in the promotion and the lack of attention they were given. Aguayo formed his own professional wrestling promotion called Perros del Mal Producciones; one of the first "Non-Perro" wrestlers they announced was Olímpico, who had left CMLL for the same reason as Aguayo. Olímpico became a regular on Perros del Mal shows, as well as working for International Wrestling Revolution Group and various Independent wrestling promotions all over Mexico. On March 20, 2009, Olímpico defeated Angel Blanco, Jr. to win the vacant WWA Middleweight Championship, although some confusion exists as a different WWA Middleweight Championship is used around the Monterrey area. Olímpico later stated that he was never actually given the championship belt after the match, putting the legitimacy of the title victory further in doubt.

=== Return to CMLL ===
==== Los Invasores and Super Popular (2010–2020) ====
On May 17, 2010, Olímico returned to CMLL, running in during the main event of the show to attack Máximo. Five days later CMLL held a press conference where Olímpico was presented as part of the Los Invasores group, a group portrayed as an "invading force" from the independent scene to fight against CMLL wrestlers. On July 12, 2010, at the Promociones Gutiérrez 1st Anniversary Show Olímpico participated in a match where 10 men put their mask on the line in a match that featured five pareja incredibles teams, with the losing team being forced to wrestle each other with their mask on the line. His partner in the match was Atlantis, facing off against the teams of Místico and El Oriental, La Sombra and Histeria, El Alebrije and Volador Jr., and Último Guerrero and Averno. Olímpico and Atlantis were the last team that escaped the match, leaving El Oriental and Místico to wrestle for their masks, which ended with Místico defeating El Oriental. A few months after returning to CMLL Olímpico teamed up with his old Guerreros de la Atlantida partners Atlantis and Último Guerrero for a number of matches. During a trios tournament on the August 13, 2010 Super Viernes show Olímpico caused his team to be disqualified and then attacked his former teammates, ending their tentative relationship. As a result of his actions after the match Olímpico, Último Guerrero and Atlantis were all added to the main event of the CMLL 77th Anniversary Show, a 14-man steel cage Lucha de Apuesta, mask vs. mask match. The match came down to Olímpico and La Sombra after the other 12 men had escaped the cage; La Sombra pinned Olímpico to force him to unmask. After the match Olímpico announced that his name was Joel Bernal Galicia from Mexico City, that he was 44 years old and had been wrestling for 19 years.

On September 20, 2011, Olímpico, Psicosis II and the new leader of Los Invasores, Volador Jr., defeated Ángel de Oro, Diamante and Rush to win the Mexican National Trios Championship. They lost the title to Atlantis, Delta and Guerrero Maya, Jr. on December 16, 2011. During mid-2013, Olímpico began working in Guadalajara under a mask as "Super Popular", which he would continue until the final Guadalajara show of the year.

==== Referee Career ====
On September 4, 2020, Olímpico announced his retirement as a professional wrestler, dedicating himself as a full-time referee.

Olímpico suddenly disappeared from CMLL cards in mid-2026, refereeing his last match on May 5 and not returning until October 13. Olímpico later revealed that he had almost collapsed after refereeing the opening match on that May show, and was sent home by management. It was discerned by doctors that he had sustained a subdural hematoma from accidentally being hit in the head by a door earlier in the year, which was subsequently drained and necessitated his break to recover.

== Championships and accomplishments ==
- Consejo Mundial de Lucha Libre
  - CMLL World Welterweight Championship (2 times)
  - Mexican National Trios Championship (2 times) – with Safari and Mr. Niebla (1), and Psicosis II and Volador Jr. (1)
  - Occidente Heavyweight Championship (1 time)
  - Occidente Tag Team Championship (1 time) – with Bobby Zavala
  - Torneo Gran Alternativa (2001) – with Sicodelico, Jr.
  - CMLL Bodybuilding Contest (2006 - Advanced)
- World Wrestling Association
  - WWA Middleweight Championship (1 time)

== Luchas de Apuestas record ==
Winner (wager)	Loser (wager)	Location	Event	Date	Notes
Olímpico (mask)	Damián El Guerrero (hair)	Mexico City	Live event	1996	
Olímpico (mask)	Halcón Negro (mask)	Mexico City	Live event	October 30, 1998	
Olímpico (mask)	Brazo de Platino (mask)	Cuernavaca, Morelos	Live event	July 27, 2000	
Olímpico (mask)	Brazo de Platino (hair)	Acapulco, Guerrero	Live event	Unknown	
Olímpico (mask)	Bestial (mask)	Acapulco, Guerrero	Live event	May 16, 2001	
Olímpico (mask)	Bestial (hair)	Cuernavaca, Morelos	Live event	July 26, 2001	
Olímpico (mask)	Fuerza Boricua (mask)	Querétaro, Querétaro	Live event	September 3, 2002	
La Sombra (mask)	Olímpico (mask)	Mexico City	CMLL 77th Anniversary Show	September 3, 2010	(Note: Last two men in a steel cage match that also included Atlantis, Último Guerrero, Jushin Thunder Liger, Mr. Niebla, Averno, Mephisto, Ephesto, Místico, Volador Jr., Psicosis II, Histeria and Ell Alebrije.)
