= El Alebrije =

Mexican professional wrestler

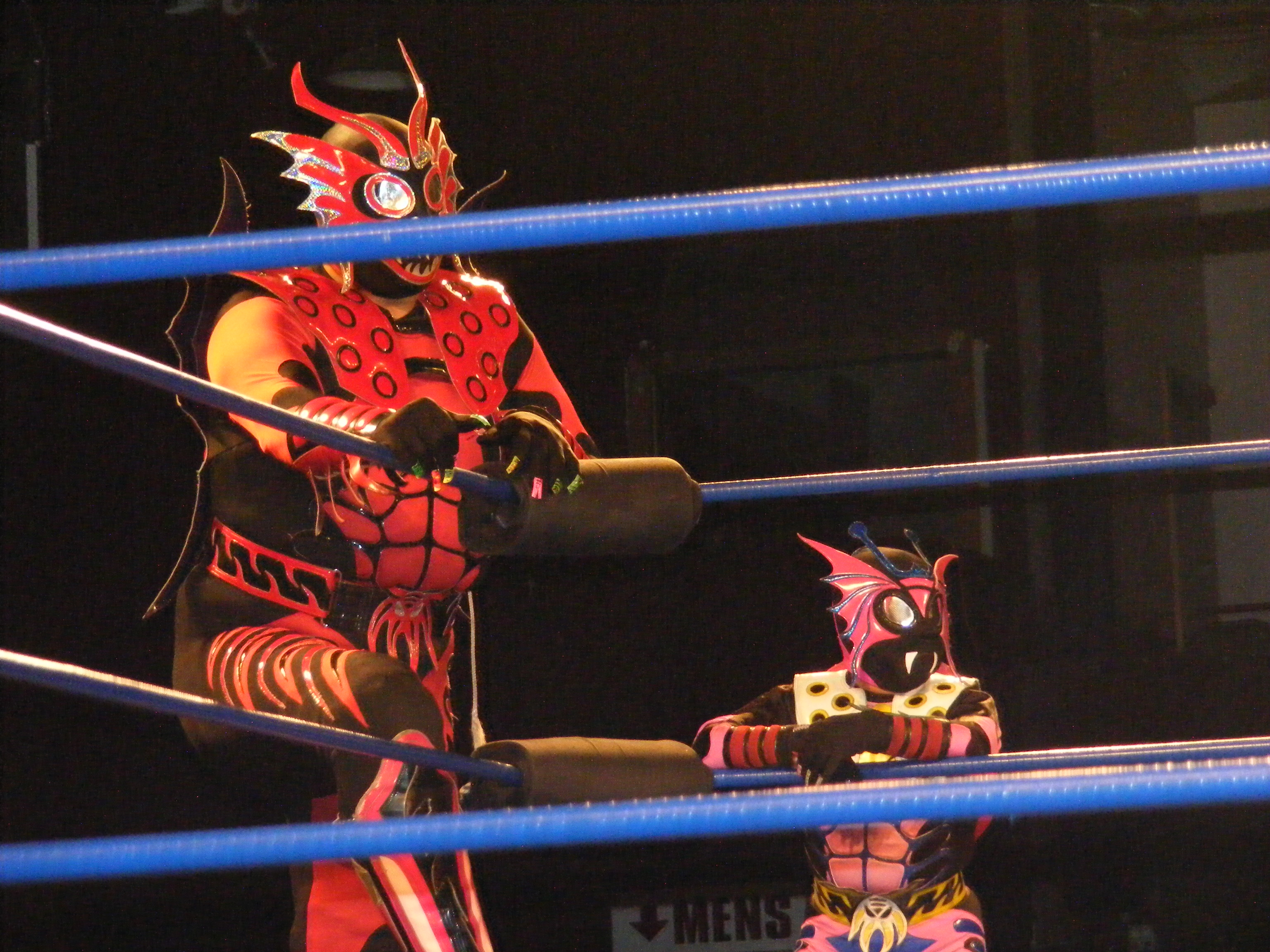
- El Alebrije (left) and Cuije in April 2010

Personal information
- Born: July 12, 1972 (age 54) Mexico
- Spouse: Tiffany (wife)

Professional wrestling career
- Ring name(s): El Alebrije; King Imperio; Kraneo; Máscara Sagrada (II); Máscara de Oro
- Billed height: 1.85 m (6 ft 1 in)
- Billed weight: 100 kg (220 lb)
- Trained by: Ojo Diabólico; El Magno
- Debut: 1988

El Alebrije (born July 12, 1972) is a Mexican professional wrestler best known for his time in Consejo Mundial de Lucha Libre (CMLL) under the ring name Kraneo. He is also known for his work in Asistencia Asesoría y Administración, where he worked for 12 years as El Alebrije, along with his Mini-Estrella companion Cuije. He has also played the role of Máscara Sagrada II after the Original Máscara Sagrada left AAA. El Alebrije's real name is not a matter of public record, as is often the case with masked wrestlers in Mexico where their private lives are kept a secret from the wrestling fans.

== Professional wrestling career ==
He made his debut under the ring name King Imperio, before switching to another character called Máscara de Oro ("Gold Mask"). Later on, he changed his gimmick to Kraneo before going to Asistencia Asesoría y Administración (AAA).

=== Asistencia Asesoría y Administración ===
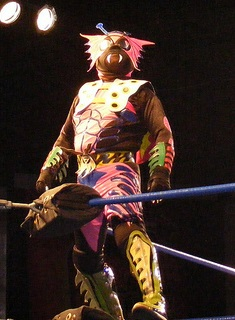
El Alebrije's Mini-Estrella companion Cuije

He was brought to AAA because of the original Máscara Sagrada's departure and was used to replace him as Máscara Sagrada II, a role he played for approximately one year. During that year, he won the Mexican National Light Heavyweight Championship, defeating Pierroth Jr. to win the title. The reign only lasted for less than a week because he would lose it to Sangre Chicana. In 1998 he was regimmicked as El Alebrije, a more comedic ring character, teamed up with Cuije, a Mini-Estrella version of the El Alebrije character. The two would feud with Monsther and Chucky for a long period of time. He also worked as a road agent behind the scenes of AAA. His first title as El Alebrije was the UWA World Junior Heavyweight Championship. On August 20, 2004, El Alebrije and Cuije won the AAA Mascot Tag Team Championship. They both made history by being the third champions and having it for the longest reign. The title was vacated on April 7, 2009, due to both of them leaving AAA. They only defended the AAA Mascot Tag Team Title a limited number of times in the 1,691 days they held the title.

=== The independent circuit ===
After leaving AAA Alebrije and Cuije began working on the Mexican independent circuit, especially for International Wrestling Revolution Group (IWRG) and Perros del Mal Producciones. El Alebrije and Cuije made their first appearance for the Philadelphia, Pennsylvania based Chikara as part of the 2010 King of Trios tournament that ran from April 23 to 25 at The Arena in Philadelphia. For the tournament Cuije wrestled alongside Alebrije and their partner El Oriental as Team Perros del Mal. After defeating "Team Delicioso" (Curry Man, El Hijo del Ice Cream and Ice Cream Jr.) in their opening round match, Team Perros del Mal was eliminated from the tournament in the quarterfinals by Der Bruderschaft des Kreuzes (Ares, Claudio Castagnoli and Tursas).

=== Consejo Mundial de Lucha Libre (2010-2026) ===
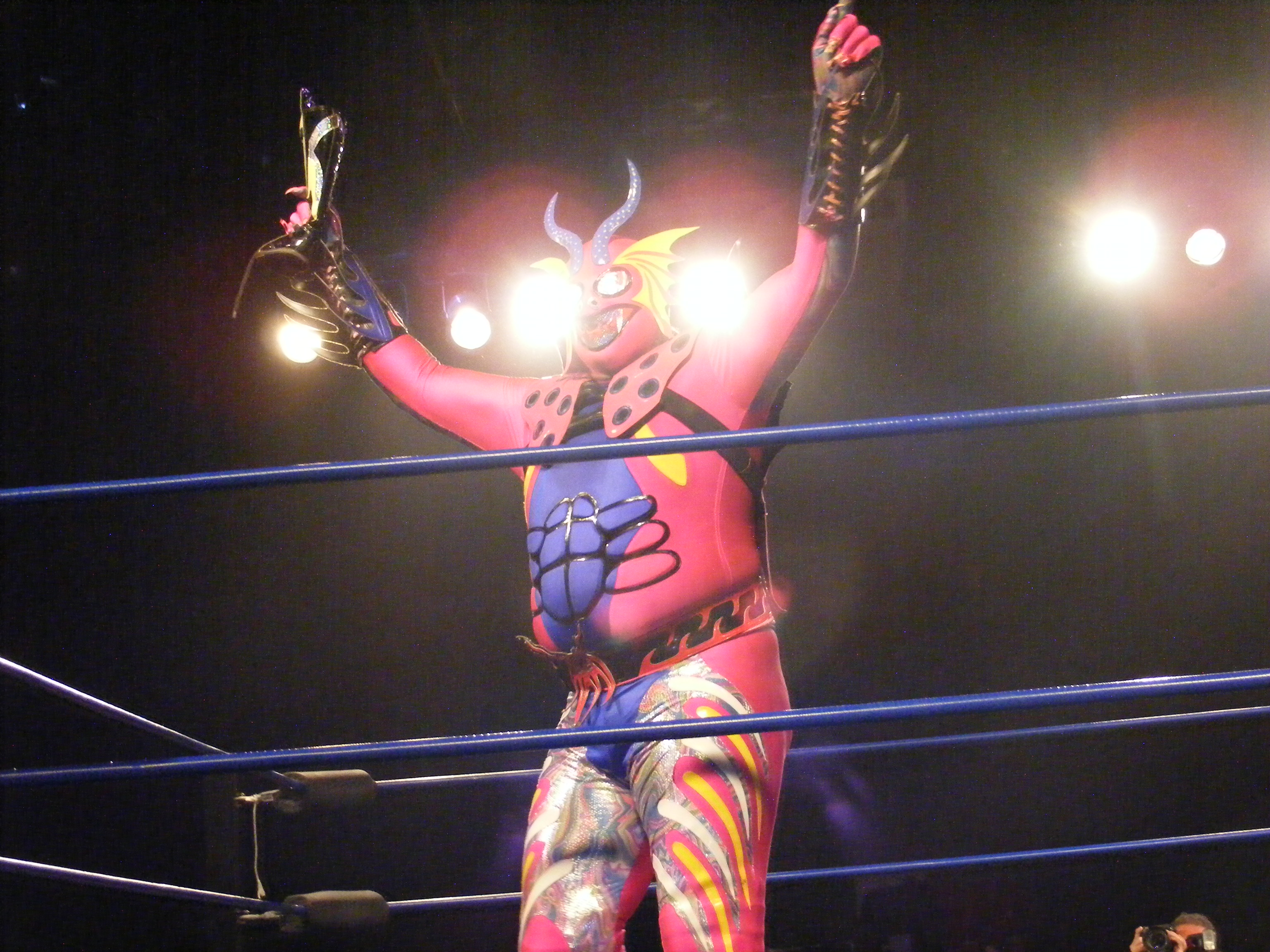
El Alebrije's Alebrije inspired fullbody suit.

On April 12, 2010, a contingent of former AAA wrestlers including El Alebrije, Cuije, Histeria, Psicosis II and Maniaco appeared on a Consejo Mundial de Lucha Libre (CMLL) show in Puebla, Puebla. The group drown into the arena in a black SUV and attacked La Sombra, El Hijo del Fantasma and La Máscara after they just finished wrestling. Brazo de Plata, Místico and Jon Strongman tried to help out but were kept away by CMLL rudos Averno, El Texano Jr. and El Terrible. Following the attack the former AAA wrestlers returned to the SUV and left the arena. The group made several subsequent attacks during CMLL shows, including running in during their Sunday Night Arena México show, indicating that the storyline was not limited to just the Puebla area. After weeks of run-ins the group, dubbed Los Independientes or "The Independents" after the Independent circuit, wrestled their first match for CMLL. In their debut for CMLL on April 26, 2010, El Alebrije, Histeria and Psicosis defeated El Hijo del Fantasma, La Máscara and La Sombra. On May 10, 2010, during a match between Los Independientes and CMLL wrestlers former CMLL and AAA wrestlers Universo 2000 and Máscara Año 2000 ran in to help Los Independientes beat up on their opponents, taking their side in the storyline between independent wrestlers and CMLL. The team was later renamed Los Invasores ("The Invaders"). During a trios match between El Alebrije, Histeria II and Maniaco and the team of Héctor Garza, Brazo de Plata and Toscano, Garza turned on his teammates and joined Los Invasores. On May 16, 2010, Psicosis wrestled against La Sombra in a match that saw the surprise appearance of both Mr. Águila and Rayo de Jalisco Jr. Mr. Águila returned to CMLL to side with Los Independientes while Rayo de Jalisco Jr. ended up siding with CMLL in their war against the outsider group. The following day in Arena Coliseo Olímpico returned to CMLL and attacked Máximo during the main event of the show, at the time it was not clear if he had actually joined the group of outsiders or not. CMLL later held a press conference announcing that they would hold a special Sin Salida event on June 6, 2010, that would center around the Los Invasores vs. CMLL storyline. During the press conference Olímpico was part of the Invasores group. It was also announced that Garza and Mr. Águila were the co-leaders of the group. On July 12, 2010, at the Promociones Gutiérrez 1st Anniversary Show El Alebrije participated in a match where 10 men put their mask on the line in a match that featured five pareja incredibles teams, with the losing team being forced to wrestle each other with their mask on the line. His partner in the match was Volador Jr., facing off against the teams of Atlantis and Olímpico, Místico and El Oriental, Histeria and La Sombra, Último Guerrero and Averno. Volador Jr. and El Alebrije was the second team to escape the match. In the end Místico defeated El Oriental to unmask him. On August 16, 2010, it was announced that El Alebrije was one of 14 men putting their mask on the line in a Luchas de Apuestas steel cage match, the main event of the CMLL 77th Anniversary Show. El Alebrije was the fourth man to leave the steel cage at the same time as his fellow Invasor Histeria, keeping both their masks safe. Both El Alebrije and Histeria returned to the cage to help their partners but were eventually removed by officials. The match came down to La Sombra pinning Olímpico to unmask him. On December 16, 2012, Alebrije, now working under his new ring name of Kraneo, won his first title in CMLL, when he and fellow Invasores Mr Águila and Psicosis defeated Los Reyes de la Atlantida (Atlantis, Delta and Guerrero Maya Jr. for the Mexican National Trios Championship. In the months following their Mexican National Trios championship victory Los Invasores began a storyline feud with the holders of the CMLL World Trios Championship, El Bufete del Amor ("The Law of Love"; Marco Corleone, Maximo and Rush), including a couple of matches for La Bufete's CMLL title, but not for Los Invasores Mexican National Trios title. Kraneo was forced to team up with rival Marco Corleone for the 2013 Torneo Nacional de Parejas Increibles ("National Incredible Pairs Tournament") where the concept was that rivals would team up for a tag team tournament. Kraneo and Corleone lost in the first round of the tournament to Shocker and Mr. Niebla as the two were unable to get along. On June 30, Los Invasores lost the Mexican National Trios Championship to La Máscara, Rush and Titán. He last wrestled for CMLL on March 7, 2026, before leaving the promotion on May 4.

=== Legal action ===
In early April 2010, El Alebrije and Histeria sought legal action against AAA over the issues of name and ring character ownership as well as unfair termination by AAA. The two claimed that they have wrestled for 13 years to create the characters and thus owned them. The parties met in Mexico City's Board of Conciliation and Arbitration to see if a settlement could be reached or if the matter would have to be taken to court. The parties met for a second arbitration meeting in late April 2010. This time the plaintiff group was joined by Latin Lover who, like Alebrije, Histeria and the others, claimed that he should be allowed to use the name since he's worked as Latin Lover for 18 years and thus should be allowed to continue using it. After the meeting it was stated that all parties involved were cooperating over the matter. In January 2012, CMLL repackaged both Alebrije and Histeria with new ring characters. Alebrije returned to performing under the Kraneo gimmick, while Cuije was renamed Mije. On June 21, 2012, AAA announced it was bringing back the El Alebrije and Cuije characters under new performers.

== Championships and accomplishments ==
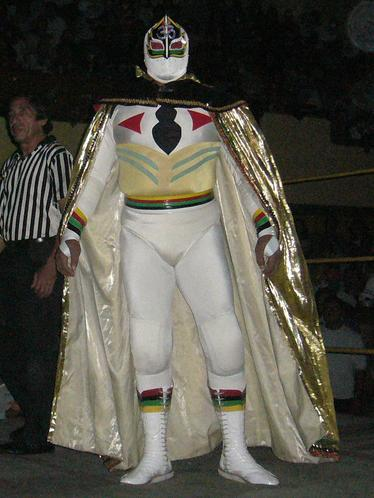
The original Máscara Sagrada, El Alebrije wore an identical outfit when he played the part.

- Asistencia Asesoría y Administración
  - AAA Mascot Tag Team Championship (1 time) – with Cuije
  - Mexican National Light Heavyweight Championship (1 time)
- Consejo Mundial de Lucha Libre
  - Mexican National Trios Championship (1 time) – with Mr. Águila and Psicosis II
- Pro Wrestling Illustrated
  - PWI ranked him # 176 of the 500 best singles wrestlers of the PWI 500 in 2005
- Universal Wrestling Association
  - UWA World Junior Heavyweight Championship (1 time)
- Regional Championships
  - Naucalpan Middleweight Championship (1 time)

== Luchas de Apuestas record ==
Winner (wager)	Loser (wager)	Location	Event	Date	Notes
Kraneo (mask)	Tormenta Negra (mask)	Naucalpan, State of Mexico	Live event	August 6, 1995	
Kraneo (mask)	Sable (mask)	Naucalpan, State of Mexico	Live event	December 17, 1995	
Máscara Sagrada (mask)	Popitekus (hair)	Tlalnepantla, State of Mexico	Live event	August 23, 1998	
Abismo Negro (hair)	El Alebrije (hair)	Tijuana, Baja California	Live event	January 9, 2007	(Note: This was a Lucha del reves, hair vs. hair match between masked wrestlers.)
Monster (hair)	El Alebrije (hair)	Tijuana, Baja California	Live event	April 14, 2008	
El Alebrije (mask)	Mr. Infierno (mask)	Mazatlan, Sinaloa	Live event	June 6, 2008	
