= Mr. Águila =

Mexican professional wrestler (born 1977)

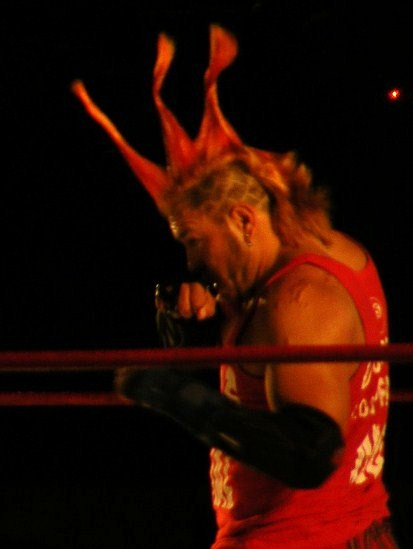
- Aguila in 2007

Personal information
- Born: José Delgado Saldaña; December 10, 1977 (age 48) Guadalajara, Jalisco, Mexico

Professional wrestling career
- Ring name(s): Águila; Essa Ríos; Mr. Águila; Papí Chulo
- Billed height: 5 ft 10 in (178 cm)
- Billed weight: 215 lb (98 kg)
- Billed from: Guadalajara, Jalisco, Mexico
- Trained by: Diablo Velasco; Flash I
- Debut: January 3, 1994

José Delgado Saldaña (born December 10, 1977) is a Mexican professional wrestler best known by his ring name Mr. Águila in Mexican wrestling promotions CMLL and AAA. Outside Mexico, Saldaña is best known for his work as Essa Ríos in the WWF.

During his time in the WWF, Rios became the first Mexican wrestler to have a match at WrestleMania, the promotion's most important event.

== Professional wrestling career ==
=== Early career (1994–1997) ===
Saldaña debuted on January 3, 1994. In May 1997, he began wrestling for Consejo Mundial de Lucha Libre (CMLL). In August 1997, he began wrestling for Promo Azteca.

=== World Wrestling Federation (1997–2001) ===
Delgado made his debut in the World Wrestling Federation (WWF) on the November 3, 1997 episode of Raw is War as part of its newly relaunched Light Heavyweight division at the age of 19, wrestling under the ring name Águila. This period included a match with Taka Michinoku at WrestleMania XIV for the WWF Light Heavyweight Championship. On the May 9, 1998 edition of Shotgun Saturday Night Delgado re-debuted under the name Papi Chulo, this time wrestling without a mask.

He won the WWF Light Heavyweight Championship from Gillberg on his 'debut' as Essa Ríos during the February 13, 2000 edition of Sunday Night Heat. His reign was a short-lived one, as he would lose the title to Dean Malenko a few weeks later. During his time as Essa Ríos, he was managed by Lita who would often repeat Ríos's finishing moves on wrestlers he had just beaten after a match. He and Lita had a feud with Eddie Guerrero and Chyna which led to a European title match between Ríos and then-champion Guerrero at Backlash, which Ríos lost. Ríos' partnership with Lita ended during the May 25, 2000 edition of Smackdown! after an angry Ríos attacked Lita because he had lost a match. It was there that the Hardy Boyz came to Lita's rescue and feuded with him briefly, with Lita becoming their protégé. Ríos lapsed into obscurity by late 2000 but did have a brief feud with Kurt Angle that culminated in a main event match on Sunday Night Heat.

He also had a small involvement in the Invasion angle, most notably unsuccessfully challenging Chris Kanyon for the WCW United States Championship on an episode of WWF Metal, which would be his last televised match with the company on August 27 (aired September 1). Having been off television for months, Ríos was released from the WWF and started accepting Japanese bookings in December 2001.

=== Extreme Championship Wrestling (1999) ===
He had a high-flying match with Taka Michinoku during Extreme Championship Wrestling's 1999 Cyberslam event. This would be his only match in ECW.

=== AAA (2001–2008) ===
After being released in September 2001, he returned to Mexico for several years before working in AAA as part of the LLL storyline. He soon returned to Mexico, however, continuing his feud with El Zorro and forming "X-team" with Juventud Guerrera and Charly Manson. In 2005, he jumped to Consejo Mundial de Lucha Libre as a member of Los Perros del Mal which was led by Héctor Garza and Perro Aguayo, Jr. who had jumped from AAA in the past. When Perro Aguayo, Jr. left CMLL in the fall of 2008, Mr. Águila left the promotion with him to help form the Perros del Mal Producciones.

=== Total Nonstop Action Wrestling (2004) ===
Águila made a comeback to the United States in 2004 as part of Team AAA/Mexico in Total Nonstop Action Wrestling with Abismo Negro, Juventud Guerrera, Héctor Garza and Heavy Metal. He competed in TNA as part of the X Division.

=== Consejo Mundial de Lucha Libre (2010–2017) ===
On May 16, 2010, Mr. Águila returned to CMLL, interfering in a match between Psicosis II and La Sombra, siding with Psicosis II and a group called Los Invasores, the match also saw the return of Rayo de Jalisco, Jr. who ended up siding with CMLL in their war against the outsider group. CMLL later held a press conference announcing that they would hold a special Sin Salida event on June 6, 2010, that would center around the Los Invasores vs. CMLL storyline. During the press conference it was revealed that Mr. Águila and Héctor Garza were the co-leaders of Los Invasores. At the July 16, 2010 Super Viernes, Mr. Águila and Héctor Garza defeated the team of La Sombra and Volador Jr. to win the CMLL World Tag Team Championship. By virtue of holding the CMLL World Tag Team Championship, Mr. Águila participated in the 2010 Universal Championship tournament. He was part of "Block B" that competed on the August 6, 2010 Super Viernes show where he was eliminated from the tournament when he lost to La Máscara in the first round. On November 2, 2010, Águila and Garza lost the CMLL World Tag Team Championship to Dragón Rojo, Jr. and Último Guerrero. On December 3, 2010, at Sin Piedad 2010 Águila had his trademark hair shaved off after being defeated by Rey Bucanero in a Lucha de Apuesta.

On June 20, 2012, Águila formed the Los Depredadores del Aire ("The Flying Predators") stable with Black Warrior and Volador Jr. Two days later, Los Depredadores del Aire defeated Los Reyes de la Atlantida (Atlantis, Delta and Guerrero Maya, Jr.) to win the Mexican National Trios Championship. They lost the title back to Los Reyes de la Atlantida on October 30, 2012. Águila, this time teaming with Los Invasores members Kraneo and Psicosis II, regained the title from Los Reyes de la Atlantida on December 16, 2012. In the fall of 2012 Los Invasores began a feud against the CMLL World Trios Champions El Bufete del Amor ("The Law of Love"; Marco Corleone, Máximo and Rush). The two teams fought several occasions with El Bufete's CMLL World Trios Championship on the line, while Los Invasores Mexican National Trios Championship being passed over compared to the more prestigious CMLL title. Mr. Águila was forced to team up with Máximo for the 2013 Torneo Nacional de Parejas Increibles ("National Incredible Pairs Tournament"), a tag team tournament teaming up wrestlers who would never team up otherwise, often because they are rivals, would be forced to work together. Mr. Águila and Máximo lost to the team of Máscara Dorada and Mephisto even though they were able to put their differences aside for one night. On June 30, Los Invasores lost the Mexican National Trios Championship to La Máscara, Rush and Titán. On July 19 at Infierno en el Ring, Águila lost his hair to Shocker in a ten-man steel cage Lucha de Apuestas.

=== Return to AAA (2017–present) ===
In November 2017, Mr. Águila made a surprise appearance at Lucha Libre AAA Worldwide.

== Championships and accomplishments ==
- AAA
  - Mexican National Heavyweight Championship (1 time)
- Consejo Mundial de Lucha Libre
  - CMLL World Tag Team Championship (1 time) – with Héctor Garza
  - CMLL World Trios Championship (1 time) – with Héctor Garza and Perro Aguayo, Jr.
  - Mexican National Trios Championship (3 times) – with Damian 666 and Halloween (1) and Black Warrior and Volador Jr. (1), and Kraneo and Psicosis II (1)
- International Wrestling Association
  - IWA World Junior Heavyweight Championship (1 time)
- International Wrestling Revolution Group
  - Copa Higher Power (1997) – with Dr. Cerebro, Fantasy, Mr. Águila, Neblina and Tony Rivera
- Pro Wrestling Illustrated
  - PWI ranked him #446 of the 500 best singles wrestlers during the "PWI Years" in 2003
- Total Nonstop Action Wrestling
  - America's X Cup (2004) – with Juventud Guerrera, Abismo Negro, Héctor Garza and Heavy Metal
- Universal Wrestling Association
  - UWA World Light Heavyweight Championship (2 times)
- World Wrestling Federation
  - WWF Light Heavyweight Championship (1 time)
- Wrestling Observer Newsletter awards
  - Rookie of the Year (1997)

== Luchas de Apuestas record ==
Winner (wager)	Loser (wager)	Location	Event	Date	Notes
Mr. Águila (mask)	Torbellino Negro (hair)	unknown	Live event	unknown	
Último Guerrero (mask)	Mr. Águila (mask)	Mexico City	CMLL 65th Anniversary Show	September 11, 1998	
Mr. Águila (hair)	MS-2 (mask)	Tijuana, Baja California	Live event	December 5, 2003	
Mr. Águila (hair)	Blade (hair)	Guadalajara, Jalisco	Live event	January 23, 2005	
Los Guerreros del Infierno (hair) (Rey Bucanero and Tarzan Boy)	Los Perros del Mal (hair) (Damián 666 and Mr. Águila)	Mexico City	50. Aniversario de Arena México	April 28, 2006	
Rey Bucanero (hair)	Mr. Águila (hair)	Mexico City	Sin Piedad	December 3, 2010	
Shocker (hair)	Mr. Águila (hair)	Mexico City	Infierno en el Ring	July 19, 2013	(Note: This was a 10-man steel cage match, which also included Averno, Blue Panther, Máximo, Negro Casas, Rey Bucanero, Rey Escorpión, Rush and Brazo de Plata.)
Mr. Águila (hair)	Black Steel (hair)	Guadalajara, Jalisco	Live event	November 29, 2015	
Mr. Águila (hair)	Dark Ozz (hair)	Zamora, Michoacán	Promotora Zamorana show	October 19, 2019	
