= Leyenda de Plata (1999) =

Mexican professional wrestling tournament

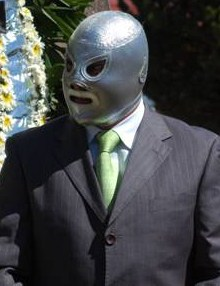
- El Hijo del Santo, 1999 tournament winner and son of the man the tournament was in honor of
- Promotion: Consejo Mundial de Lucha Libre
- Date: November 26, 1999; December 2, 1999
- City: Mexico City, Mexico
- Venue: Arena México

Event chronology
| ← Previous; CMLL 66th Anniversary Show | Next → Copa de Arena México |

Leyenda de Plata chronology
| ← Previous; 1998 | Next → 2000 |

The Leyenda de Plata (1999) was professional wrestling tournament produced by the Mexican wrestling promotion Consejo Mundial de Lucha Libre (CMLLl; Spanish "World Wrestling Council") that ran from November 26, 1999, over the course of two of CMLL's Friday night shows in Arena México with the finals on December 2, 1999. The annual Leyenda de Plata tournament is held in honor of lucha libre legend El Santo and is one of CMLL's most important annual tournaments.

The qualifying Cibernetico took place on November 26, 1999 and saw El Hijo del Santo outlast a field of 15 other wrestlers including Antifaz del Norte, Bestia Salvaje, BlacK warrior, Blue Panther, Emilio Charles Jr., El Felino, Fuerza Guerrera, Negro Casas, Olímpico, Rey Bucanero, Satánico, Tarzan Boy, Tony Rivera, Último Guerrero and Zumbido. El Hijo del Santo only eliminated one wrestler in the match, Último Guerrero to qualify for the final. Like in 1998 the 1999 Leyenda de Plata cibernetico winner went straight to the final, a rematch from the 1998 tournament, only this time El Hijo del Santo defeated Scorpio Jr. to win the tournament named after his father.

== Production ==
=== Background ===
The Leyenda de Plata (Spanish for "the Silver Legend") is an annual lucha libre tournament scripted and promoted by the Mexican professional wrestling promotion Consejo Mundial de Lucha Libre (CMLL). The first Leyenda de Plata was held in 1998 and was in honor of El Santo, nicknamed Enmáscarado de Plata (the Silver mask) from which the tournament got its name. The trophy given to the winner is a plaque with a metal replica of the mask that El Santo wore in both wrestling and lucha films.

The Leyenda de Plata was held annually until 2003, at which point El Santo's son, El Hijo del Santo left CMLL on bad terms. The tournament returned in 2004 and has been held on an almost annual basis since then. The original format of the tournament was the Torneo cibernetico elimination match to qualify for a semi-final. The winner of the semi-final would face the winner of the previous year's tournament in the final. Since 2005 CMLL has held two cibernetico matches and the winner of each then meet in the semi-final. In 2011, the tournament was modified to eliminate the final stage as the previous winner, Místico, did not work for CMLL at that point in time

=== Storylines ===
The events featured a total of number of professional wrestling matches with different wrestlers involved in pre-existing scripted feuds, plots and storylines. Wrestlers were portrayed as either heels (referred to as rudos in Mexico, those that portray the "bad guys") or faces (técnicos in Mexico, the "good guy" characters) as they followed a series of tension-building events, which culminated in a wrestling match or series of matches.

== Tournament overview ==
=== Cibernetico ===
| # | Eliminated | Eliminated by |
|---|---|---|
| 1 | Tony Rivera | Bestia Salvaje |
| 2 | Antifaz del Nortre | El Satánico |
| 3 | Bestia Salvaje | Tarzan Boy |
| 4 | Zumbido | Negro Casas |
| 5 | Rey Bucanero | Olímpico |
| 6 | Negro Casas | Fuerza Guerrera |
| 7 | El Felino | Emilio Charles Jr. |
| 8 | El Satánico | Blue Panther |
| 9 | Emilio Charles Jr. | Blue Panther |
| 9 | Blue Panther | Emilio Charles Jr. |
| 11 | Fuerza Guerrera | Olímpico |
| 12 | Olímpico | Tarzan Boy |
| 13 | Tarzan Boy | Black Warrior |
| 14 | Black Warrior | Último Guerrero |
| 15 | Último Guerrero | El Hijo del Santo |
| 16 | Winner | El Hijo del Santo |

== Results ==
=== November 26, 1999 ===
| No. | Results | Stipulations |
|---|---|---|
| 1 | Astro Rey Jr. and Starman defeated Dr. O'Borman Jr. and Rencor Latino | Best two-out-of-three falls tag team match |
| 2 | El Hijo del Santo defeated Antifaz del Norte, Olímpico, Tarzan Boy, Tony Rivera, El Felino, Negro Casas, Emilio Charles Jr., Rey Bucanero, Último Guerrero, Black Warrior, El Satánico, Bestia Salvaje, Blue Panther, Fuerza Guerrera, and Zumbido | 1999 Leyenda de Plata semi-final, 16-man torneo cibernetico elimination match |
| 3 | Jushin Liger defeated Shocker | Singles match for the IWGP Junior Heavyweight Championship |
| 4 | Pierroth Jr. defeated Brazo de Plata | "Loser advances" singles match |
| 5 | Pierroth Jr. defeated Apolo Dantés | "Loser advances" singles match |
| 6 | Brazo de Plata defeated Apolo Dantés | Lucha de Apuestas, hair vs. hair match |

=== December 3, 1999 ===
| No. | Results | Stipulations |
|---|---|---|
| 1 | Ángel Azteca, Pantera, and Tigre Blanco defeated Rencor Latino, Valentin Mayo, and Virus | Best two-out-of-three falls six-man tag team match |
| 2 | Bestia Salvaje, Shocker, and Zumbido defeated Emilio Charles Jr., Negro Casas, and Tarzan Boy by disqualification | Best two-out-of-three falls six-man tag team match |
| 3 | Giganté Silva, Rayo de Jalisco Jr., and Tinieblas Jr. defeated Apolo Dantés, Cien Caras, Último Guerrero, and Universo 2000 | Best two-out-of-three falls four-versus-thee man tag team match |
| 4 | El Hijo del Santo defeated Scorpió Jr. | 1999 Leyenda de Plata final match |
| 5 | Pierroth Jr. defeated Brazo de Plata | Lucha de Apuestas, hair vs. hair match |
