= Leyenda de Plata (2006) =

Mexican professional wrestling tournament

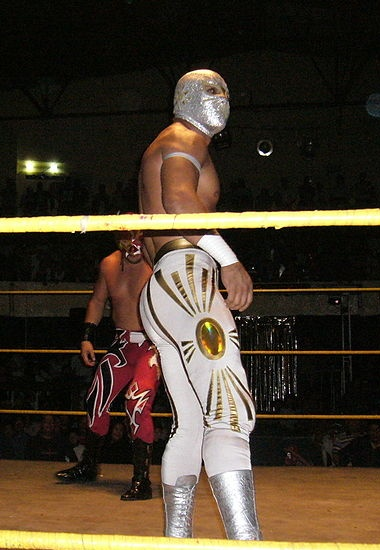
- Tournament winner Místico in the ring.
- Promotion: Consejo Mundial de Lucha Libre
- Date: August 25, 2006; September 1, 2006; September 8, 2006; September 15, 2006
- City: Mexico City, Mexico
- Venue: Arena México

Event chronology
← Previous; Reyes del Aire	Next → CMLL 73rd Anniversary Show

Leyenda de Plata chronology
← Previous; 2005	Next → 2007

The Leyenda de Plata (2006) was professional wrestling tournament produced by the Mexican wrestling promotion Consejo Mundial de Lucha Libre (CMLLl; Spanish "World Wrestling Council") that ran from August 25, 2006 over the course of four of CMLL's Friday night shows in Arena México with the finals on September 15, 2006. The annual Leyenda de Plata tournament is held in honor of lucha libre legend El Santo and is one of CMLL's most important annual tournaments.

The torneo cibernetico elimination match saw Black Warrior eliminate Rey Bucanero as the last man in a match that also included Heavy Metal, Metro, La Máscara, Último Guerrero, Mephisto and Misterioso Jr. With Black Warrior winning the first cibernetico it was not too surprising that Místico won the second cibernetico as the two had been involved with a long-running storyline feud throughout 2006. Místico outlasted Mr. Águila, Negro Casas, El Sagrado, Volador Jr., Averno and Alex Koslov. The semi-final on September 8, 2006, saw Místico defeat Black Warrior, followed by a "mask vs. mask", Luchas de Apuesta challenge from Black Warrior that Místico accepted for the CMLL 73rd Anniversary Show. On September 15, 2006 Místico defeated Atlantis to win the Leyeda de Plata, overcoming interference from Atlantis' corner-man Black Warrior. After the match Black Warrior stole the Leyenda de Plata trophy and ran off with it, furthering their feud.

== Production ==
=== Background ===
The Leyenda de Plata (Spanish for "the Silver Legend") is an annual lucha libre tournament scripted and promoted by the Mexican professional wrestling promotion Consejo Mundial de Lucha Libre (CMLL). The first Leyenda de Plata was held in 1998 and was in honor of El Santo, nicknamed Enmáscarado de Plata (the Silver mask) from which the tournament got its name. The trophy given to the winner is a plaque with a metal replica of the mask that El Santo wore in both wrestling and lucha films.

The Leyenda de Plata was held annually until 2003, at which point El Santo's son, El Hijo del Santo left CMLL on bad terms. The tournament returned in 2004 and has been held on an almost annual basis since then. The original format of the tournament was the Torneo cibernetico elimination match to qualify for a semi-final. The winner of the semi-final would face the winner of the previous year's tournament in the final. Since 2005 CMLL has held two cibernetico matches and the winner of each then meet in the semi-final. In 2011, the tournament was modified to eliminate the final stage as the previous winner, Místico, did not work for CMLL at that point in time The 2006 edition of La Leyenda de Plata was the eighth overall tournament held by CMLL.

=== Storylines ===
The events featured a total of number of professional wrestling matches with different wrestlers involved in pre-existing scripted feuds, plots and storylines. Wrestlers were portrayed as either heels (referred to as rudos in Mexico, those that portray the "bad guys") or faces (técnicos in Mexico, the "good guy" characters) as they followed a series of tension-building events, which culminated in a wrestling match or series of matches.

== Tournament overview ==
=== Cibernetico 1 ===
#	Eliminated	Eliminated by
1	La Máscara	N/A
2	Metro	N/A
3	Mephisto	N/A
4	Misterioso Jr.	N/A
5	Último Guerrero	N/A
6	Heavy Metal	N/A
7	Rey Bucanero	Black Warrior
8	Winner	Black Warrior

=== Cibernetico 2 ===
#	Eliminated	Eliminated by
1	El Sagrado	Mr. Águila
2	Alex Koslov	Damián 666
3	Negro Casas	Volador Jr.
4	Averno	Volador Jr.
5	Volador Jr.	Damián 666
6	Damián 666	Mr. Águila & Místico
7	Mr. Águila	Místico
8	Winner	Místico

== Results ==
=== August 25, 2006 ===
No.	Results	Stipulations
1	Tigre Blanco and Tigre Metálico defeated Arkángel de la Muerte and Hooligan	Best two-out-of-three falls tag team match
2	Blue Panther, Dos Caras Jr., and Lizmark Jr. defeated Alex Koslov, Máscara Año 2000, and Universo 2000	Best two-out-of-three falls six-man tag team match
3	Atlantis, Olímpico, and Tarzan Boy defeated Dr. Wagner Jr., Místico, and Volador Jr.	Best two-out-of-three falls six-man tag team match
4	Black Warrior defeated Heavy Metal, Rey Bucanero, Metro, La Máscara, Último Guerrero, Mephisto, and Misterioso Jr.	2006 Leyenda de Plata qualifier, 8-man torneo cibernetico elimination match
5	El Hijo del Santo defeated el Hijo del Perro Aguayo	Best two-out-of-three falls match

=== September 1, 2006 ===
No.	Results	Stipulations
1	Tigre Blanco and Tigre Metálico defeated Los Hombres del Camuflaje (Artillero and Súper Comando)	Best two-out-of-three falls tag team match
2	El Felino, Máximo, and Metro defeated Mephisto, Misterioso Jr., and Sangre Azteca	Best two-out-of-three falls six-man tag team match
3	Kenzo Suzuki, Pierroth Jr., and Universo 2000 defeated Lizmark Jr., La Máscara, and Lizmark	Best two-out-of-three falls six-man tag team match
4	Místico defeated Negro Casas, El Sagrado, Volador Jr., Damián 666, Mr. Águila, Averno, and Alex Koslov	2006 Leyenda de Plata qualifier, 8-man torneo cibernetico elimination match
5	el Hijo del Perro Aguayo, Héctor Garza, and El Terrible defeated Blue Panther, Dr. Wagner Jr., and Heavy Metal	Best two-out-of-three falls six-man tag team match

=== September 8, 2006 ===
No.	Results	Stipulations
1	Texano Jr. and Trueno defeated Apocalipsis and Ramstein	Best two-out-of-three falls tag team match
2	India Sioux, Lady Apache, and Marcela defeated Hiroka, Medussa, and Rosa Negra	Best two-out-of-three falls six-woman tag team match
3	Averno, Eclipse, and Mephisto defeated Blue Panther, La Máscara, and El Sagrado	Best two-out-of-three falls six-man tag team match
4	Atlantis, Kenzo Suzuki, and Último Guerrero defeated Dr. Wagner Jr., Rey Bucanero, and Último Dragón	Best two-out-of-three falls six-man tag team match
5	el Hijo del Perro Aguayo, Mr. Águila, and Shocker defeated Heavy Metal, Lizmark Jr., and Negro Casas	Best two-out-of-three falls six-man tag team match
6	Místico defeated Black Warrior	2006 Leyenda de Plata semi-finals

=== September 15, 2006 ===
No.	Results	Stipulations
1	Pequeño Damian 666 and Pequeño Halloween defeated Pequeño Olímpico and Último Dragóncito	Best two-out-of-three falls tag team match
2	Dark Angel, India Sioux, and Lady Apache defeated Hiroka, La Nazi, and Princesa Sugehit	Best two-out-of-three falls six-woman tag team match
3	La Máscara, Máximo, and Volador Jr. defeated Hombre Sin Nombre, Ohara, and Okumura	Best two-out-of-three falls six-man tag team match
4	Dos Caras Jr., Rey Bucanero, and Último Dragón defeated Alex Koslov, Kenzo Suzuki, and Marco Corleone by disqualification	Best two-out-of-three falls six-man tag team match
5	el Hijo del Perro Aguayo, Héctor Garza, and Shocker defeated Olímpico, Tarzan Boy, and Último Guerrero	Best two-out-of-three falls six-man tag team match
6	Místico defeated Atlantis	2006 Leyenda de Plata finals
