= Festival de las Máscaras (2017) =

2017 International Wrestling Revolution Group event

- Official poster of the event
- Date: July 2, 2017
- City: Naucalpan, State of Mexico
- Venue: Arena Naucalpan

Event chronology
← Previous; 3 Cabelleras vs. 3 Cabelleras	Next → Prisión Fatal

IWRG Festival de las Máscaras chronology
← Previous; 2016	Next → 2018

The Festival de las Máscaras (2017) (Spanish for "Festival of the Masks") was a major annual lucha libre event produced and scripted by the Mexican International Wrestling Revolution Group (IWRG) professional wrestling promotion held on July 2, 2017. The show was held in Arena Naucalpan, Naucalpan, State of Mexico, which is IWRG's primary venue. For the 2017 event Bombero Infernal, Black Warrior, Cerebro Negro, Demonio Infernal, El Hijo del Diablo, Máscara Año 2000 Jr., Oficial 911, Oficial AK-47, Oficial Fierro, Veneno, and Villano IV all wore their masks again after having lost Luchas de Apuestas, or "bet matches", in the past and thus lost the rights to wear their mask. Others worked under a previous ring name, wearing the mask of their former alter ego such as Freelance (working as "Panterita"), Black Terry (as "Guerrero Maya Sr."), Oficial Factor and Oficial Spartan (as "Mega" and "Súper Mega") and Mike Segura (as "Orito")

Lucha libre legends Villano III and Villano V were honored prior to the main event, where Villano V Jr. was officially introduced. The son of Villano V had previously worked under the ring name "Kortiz" but was officially given the "Villano" name at this event. Afterwards Villano V Jr. teamed up with his cousin Villano III Jr. and his uncle Villano IV to defeat the trio of Negro Navarro, El Texano Jr., and Trauma II by disqualification. On the undercard Black Warrior defeated Carístico, the very man who had won Warrior's mask years prior. The show featured five additional matches.

== Production ==
=== Background ===
The wrestling mask has always held a sacred place in lucha libre, carrying with it a mystique and anonymity beyond what it means to wrestlers elsewhere in the world. The ultimate humiliation a luchador can suffer is to lose a Lucha de Apuestas, or bet match. Following a loss in a Lucha de Apuesta match the masked wrestler would be forced to unmask, state their real name and then would be unable to wear that mask while wrestling anywhere in Mexico. Since 2007 the Mexican wrestling promotion International Wrestling Revolution Group (IWRG; Sometimes referred to as Grupo Internacional Revolución in Spanish) has held a special annual show where they received a waiver to the rule from the State of Mexico Wrestling Commission and wrestlers would be allowed to wear the mask they previously lost in a Lucha de Apuestas.

The annual IWRG Festival de las Máscaras ("Festival of the Masks") event is also partly a celebration or homage of lucha libre history with IWRG honoring wrestlers of the past at the events similar to Consejo Mundial de Lucha Libre's (CMLL) Homenaje a Dos Leyendas ("Homage to Two Legends") annual shows. The IWRG's Festival de las Máscaras shows, as well as the majority of their major IWRG shows in general, are held in Arena Naucalpan, owned by the promoters of IWRG and is their main venue. The 2018 Festival de las Máscaras show was the eleventh year in a row IWRG held the show.

=== Storylines ===
The Festival de las Máscaras event featured eight professional wrestling matches with different wrestlers involved in pre-existing scripted feuds, plots and storylines. Wrestlers were portrayed as either heels (referred to as rudos in Mexico, those that portray the "bad guys") or faces (técnicos in Mexico, the "good guy" characters) as they followed a series of tension-building events, which culminated in a wrestling match or series of matches.

The semi-main event of the show was built off a decade old rivalry, dating back to 2006 where Black Warrior and Carístico (then known as Místico) were embroiled in a major storyline feud for Consejo Mundial de Lucha Libre (CMLL). As part of the feud Black Warrior defeated Carístico to win the NWA World Middleweight Championship on May 12, 2006. The feud culminated in a Lucha de Apuestas, or "bet match", between the two. Both wrestlers put their mask on the line on in the main event of the CMLL 73rd Anniversary Show. Carístico defeated Black Warrior, forcing Black Warrior to unmask as a result and, according to lucha libre tradition, never wrestle wearing the Black Warrior mask again. On April 29, 2007 Carístico regained the NWA World Middleweight Championship to put an end to their storyline feud at the time. IWRG promoted the match between the two as a feature match, placing it in the semi-main event sport for the Festival de las Máscaras, pushing the angle that this would be Black Warrior's chance for revenge, while wearing the mask he had lost in 2006.

The "Trios" match type (three versus three men tag team matches) became incredibly popular in Mexico in the early 1980s, to the point where the trios match is the most common match on wrestling shows. Two of the teams that helped popularize the Trios matches was Los Misioneros de la Muerte (El Texano, Negro Navarro and El Signo) and Los Villanos (Villano III, Villano IV and Villano V). IWRG's "Festival de las Máscaras" shows is normally their way of paying homage to lucha libre history, which for 2017 meant that they booked versions of those two factions in the main event. El Texano died in 2006, and El Signo retired in 2010, leaving only Negro Navarro as an active competitor. For the Festival de las Máscaras show IWRG brought in El Texano's son, El Texano Jr. and Negro Navarro's son Trauma II to represent the Los Misionero side of the match. Both Villano III and V had retired by 2017, but IWRG had Villano III Jr. represent his father, while Villano V's son Kortiz would fill out the other side for the match.

== Main Event ==
Prior to the main event of the show, Villano V introduced Villano V Jr., marking the first time that Kortiz had officially wrestled under that name. During the main event, Los Misioneros would isolate Villano III Jr. for long periods of time. tearing up his mask and making him bleed profusely. The Villanos won the match when El Texano Jr. was caught breaking the rules, causing a disqualification after a low blow to Villano III Jr. After the match, Los Villanos gained a measure of revenge by chasing off their opponents when they brought folding chairs into the ring.

== Aftermath ==
Following his loss to long-time rival Black Warrior in the semi-main event, Carístico to another Lucha de Apuestas match, putting his mask on the line against the hair of Black Warrior. The storyline between the two was one of the focal points for the build to IWRG's next major event, the 2017 Prisión Fatal ("Deadly Prison") show. That feud, and an ongoing feud between IWRG Intercontinental Heavyweight Champion Mr. Electro and Trauma II was combined for the eponymous Prisión Fatal steel cage match main event. The match ended with Carístico once againd defeating his rival Black Warrior, this time forcing Black Warrior to have all his hair shaved off as a result of the loss.

== Results ==
No.	Results	Stipulations
1	Black Dragón, Dinamic Black, and Dragón Fly defeated Hip Hop Man, La Mosca, and Pibe Alfajor	Six-man tag team match
2	Aramís, Orito, and Panterita defeated Atomic Star, Demonio Infernal, and Eterno	Six-man tag team match
3	Cerebro Negro and Veneno defeated Bombero Infernal and El Hijo del Diablo	tag team match
4	Los Oficiales (Oficial 911, Oficial AK-47, and Oficial Fierro) defeated Los Megas (Mega, Omega, and Súper Mega)	Six-man tag team match
5	Imposible (c) vs. Súper Nova ended in a draw	Singles match for the IWRG Rey del Ring Championship
6	Internacional Pantera, Mr. Electro, and Trauma I defeated Groon XXX, Guerrero Maya Sr., and Máscara Año 2000 Jr.	Six-man tag team match
7	Black Warrior defeated Carístico	Singles match
8	Villano III Jr., Villano IV, and Villano V Jr. defeated Los Nueva Misioneros de la Muerte (Negro Navarro, El Texano Jr., and Trauma II) by disqualification	Six-man tag team match
(c) / – the champion(s) heading into the match
