= Leyenda de Plata (1998) =

Mexican professional wrestling tournament

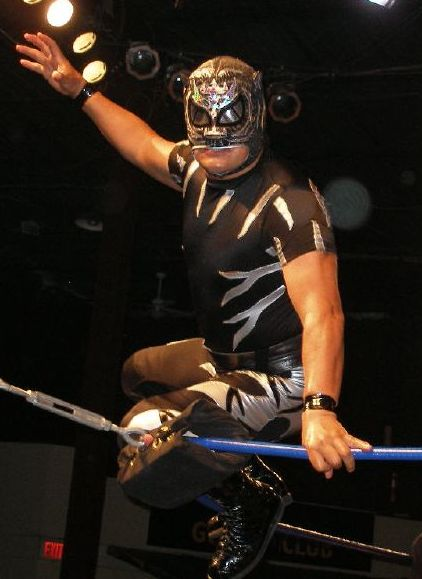
- El Pantera (depicted in 2008), one of the participants in the first version of Leyenda de Plata
- Promotion: Consejo Mundial de Lucha Libre
- Date: July 24, 1998; July 31, 1998
- City: Mexico City, Mexico
- Venue: Arena México

Event chronology
← Previous; Ruleta de la Muerte	Next → International Gran Prix

Leyenda de Plata chronology
← Previous; First	Next → 1999

The Leyenda de Plata (1998) was professional wrestling tournament produced by the Mexican wrestling promotion Consejo Mundial de Lucha Libre (CMLLl; Spanish "World Wrestling Council") that ran from July 24, 1998, over the course of two of CMLL's Friday night shows in Arena México with the finals on July 31, 1998. The annual Leyenda de Plata tournament is held in honor of lucha libre legend El Santo and is one of CMLL's most important annual tournaments.

The first ever Leyenda de Plata tournament was held to commemorate the 15 year anniversary of El Santo's death in 1983. Unlike later tournaments there was no final match against the previous winner, instead El Santo's son, El Hijo del Santo, faced the winner of the Cibernetico to determine the first winner. Scorpio Jr. won the cibernetico, outlasting Atlantis, Shocker, Olímpico, Pantera, El Felino, Negro Casas, Tony Rivera, La Fiera, Dr. Wagner Jr., Blue Panther, Satánico, Karloff Lagarde Jr., Black Warrior, Último Guerrero and Violencia. Scorpio Jr. defeated El Hijo del Santo by count-out to win the Leyenda de Plata.

== Production ==
=== Background ===
The Leyenda de Plata (Spanish for "the Silver Legend") is an annual lucha libre tournament scripted and promoted by the Mexican professional wrestling promotion Consejo Mundial de Lucha Libre (CMLL). The first Leyenda de Plata was held in 1998 and was in honor of El Santo, nicknamed Enmáscarado de Plata (the Silver mask) from which the tournament got its name. The trophy given to the winner is a plaque with a metal replica of the mask that El Santo wore in both wrestling and lucha films.

The Leyenda de Plata was held annually until 2003, at which point El Santo's son, El Hijo del Santo left CMLL on bad terms. The tournament returned in 2004 and has been held on an almost annual basis since then. The original format of the tournament was the Torneo cibernetico elimination match to qualify for a semi-final. The winner of the semi-final would face the winner of the previous year's tournament in the final. Since 2005 CMLL has held two cibernetico matches and the winner of each then meet in the semi-final. In 2011, the tournament was modified to eliminate the final stage as the previous winner, Místico, did not work for CMLL at that point in time

=== Storylines ===
The events featured a total of twelve professional wrestling matches with different wrestlers involved in pre-existing scripted feuds, plots and storylines. Wrestlers were portrayed as either heels (referred to as rudos in Mexico, those that portray the "bad guys") or faces (técnicos in Mexico, the "good guy" characters) as they followed a series of tension-building events, which culminated in a wrestling match or series of matches.

== Results ==
=== July 24, 1998 ===
No.	Results	Stipulations
1	Flor Metálica and Lady Apache defeated La Amapola and La Diabólica	Best two-out-of-three falls tag team match
2	Brazo de Plata, El Fantasma, and Lizmark. defeated Black Magic and Los Hermanos Dinamita (Máscara Año 2000, and Universo 2000) by disqualification	Best two-out-of-three falls six-man tag team match
3	Scorpió Jr. defeated El Felino, Dr. Wagner Jr., Último Guerrero, Black Warrior, Violencia, Negro Casas, Shocker, La Fiera, Olímpico, Tony Rivera, El Satánico, Atlantis, Karloff Lagarde Jr., Pantera, and Blue Panther	1998 Leyenda de Plata, 16-man torneo cibernetico elimination match

=== July 31, 1998 ===
No.	Results	Stipulations
1	Rencor Latino and Reyes Veloz defeated Filoso and Kid Guzman	Best two-out-of-three falls tag team match
2	Mr. Águila, Olímpico, and Súper Kendo vs. Arkangel de la Muerte, Halcón Negro, and Último Guerrero ended in a double count-out	Best two-out-of-three falls six-man tag team match
3	Apolo Dantés, Villano IV, and Villano V defeated and Ángel Azteca, Emilio Charles Jr., and Shocker	Best two-out-of-three falls six-man tag team match
4	Atlantis, Brazo de Plata, and Rayo de Jalisco Jr. defeated Los Hermanos Dinamita (Cien Caras, Máscara Año 2000, and Universo 2000)	Best two-out-of-three falls six-man tag team match
5	Scorpió Jr. defeated El Hijo del Santo	1998 Leyenda de Plata finals, best two-out-of-three falls match
