= Ruleta de la Muerte (1998) =

Mexican Professional wrestling show

- Promotion(s): Consejo Mundial de Lucha Libre; Ocesa Teatro
- Date: July 18, 1998
- City: Mexico City, Mexico
- Venue: Palacio de los Deportes
- Attendance: 21,000

Pay-per-view chronology
← Previous; Torneo Gran Alternativa	Next → Leyenda de Plata

Ruleta de la Muerte chronology
← Previous; First	Next → 1999

Ruleta de la Muerte (1998) was a professional wrestling pay-per-view event produced by Consejo Mundial de Lucha Libre (CMLL) that took place on July 18, 1998 in Palacio de los Deportes, Mexico City, Mexico. The show featured the Ruleta de la Muerte¨(Spanish for "Roulette of Death") tournament, in which tag teams face off in a single elimination tournament, but unlike traditional tournaments it is the losing team that advances in the tournament. The losing team in the final match must wrestle each other in a Lucha de Apuestas match, where either their mask or their hair is on the line. The Tournament featured 16 teams, most of them created for the tournament. The show featured no additional matches outside the 15 tournament matches and the Lucha de Apuesta match.

== Background ==
The event featured 16 professional wrestling matches with different wrestlers involved in pre-existing scripted feuds or storylines. Wrestlers portray either villains (referred to as Rudos in Mexico) or fan favorites (Técnicos in Mexico) as they compete in wrestling matches with pre-determined outcomes.

== Results ==
No.	Results	Stipulations
1	Tinieblas Jr. and Universo 2000 defeated Mr. Niebla and Black Warrior	Ruleta de la Muerte first round match
2	Shu el Guerrero and Rey Bucanero defeated Máscara Sagrada and Ángel Azteca	Ruleta de la Muerte first round match
3	El Solar and El Fantasma defeated Scorpio Jr. and La Morgue	Ruleta de la Muerte first round match
4	El Hijo del Gladiator and Tormenta Star defeated Dr. Wagner Jr. and Super Astro	Ruleta de la Muerte first round match
5	Tinieblas. and El Sagrado defeated Blue Panther and El Felino	Ruleta de la Muerte first round match
6	Rey Piratita and Zapatista defeated Violencia and Abdul el Eslavo	Ruleta de la Muerte first round match
7	Rayo de Jalisco Jr. and Mil Mascaras defeated Shocker and Villaño III	Ruleta de la Muerte first round match
8	Fishman and Lizmark defeated El Hijo del Santo and Guerrero del Futuro	Ruleta de la Muerte first round match
9	Máscara Sagrada and Ángel Azteca defeated Mr. Niebla and Black Warrior	Ruleta de la Muerte quarter final match
10	Scorpio Jr. and La Morgue defeated Dr. Wagner Jr. and Super Astro	Ruleta de la Muerte quarter final match
11	Violencia and Abdul el Eslavo defeated Blue Panther and El Felino	Ruleta de la Muerte quarter final match
12	Shocker and Villaño III defeated El Hijo del Santo and Guerrero del Futuro	Ruleta de la Muerte quarter final match
13	Dr. Wagner Jr. and Super Astro defeated Mr. Niebla and Black Warrior	Ruleta de la Muerte semi-final match
14	Blue Panther and El Felino defeated El Hijo del Santo and Guerrero del Futuro	Ruleta de la Muerte semi-final match
15	Mr. Niebla and Black Warrior defeated El Hijo del Santo and Guerrero del Futuro	Ruleta de la Muerte final match
16	El Hijo del Santo defeated Guerrero del Futuro	Lucha de Apuesta, mask vs. hair match
