= Prisión Fatal (July 2017) =

2017 International Wrestling Revolution Group event

- Official poster of the event
- Promotion: International Wrestling Revolution Group
- Date: July 23, 2017
- City: Naucalpan, State of Mexico
- Venue: Arena Naucalpan

Event chronology
| ← Previous; Festival de las Máscaras | Next → Legado Final |

IWRG Prisión Fatal chronology
| ← Previous; January 2017 | Next → — |

Prisión Fatal (July 2017) was a professional wrestling major event, produced by the Mexico based International Wrestling Revolution Group (IWRG) professional wrestling promotion. The event took on July 23, 2017, at "Arena Naucalpan" in Naucalpan, State of Mexico, IWRG's main venue and was the fourth show promoted under that name. The main event was the eponymous Prisión Fatal (Spanish for "Deadly Prison") Steel cage match where the last person remaining in the cage was forced to unmasked or shaved bald as per the match stipulation. The July 2017 version of the show was the eight overall Prisión Fatal held by IWRG since the first show held in 2000.

In the main event both Mr. Electro and Trauma II escaped the cage before the end, allowing Carístico to defeat Black Warrior, forcing Black Warrior to have his hair shaved off afterward. The show featured six additional matches.

== Production ==
=== Background ===
Starting as far back as at least 2000, the Mexican wrestling promotion International Wrestling Revolution Group (IWRG; Sometimes referred to as Grupo Internacional Revolución in Spanish) has held several annual events where the main event was a multi-man steel cage match where the last wrestler left in the cage would be forced to either remove their wrestling mask or have their hair shaved off under Lucha de Apuestas, or "bet match", rules. From 2012 IWRG has promoted a variation of the steel cage match under the moniker Prisión Fatal ("Deadly Prison") at least once a year since its inception. The Prisión Fatal has the added twist that each competitor is chained by the wrist to the cage with a long steel chain and to escape they fight have to get a key to unlock their chain before they are able to escape. The added chain helps to distinguish it from other Steel cage matches held throughout the year such as the IWRG Guerra del Golfo ("Gulf War"), IWRG Guerra de Sexos ("War of the Sexes") or IWRG El Castillo del Terror ("The Tower of Terror") shows. The Prisión Fatal shows, as well as the majority of the IWRG shows in general, are held in "Arena Naucalpan", owned by the promoters of IWRG and their main arena. The July 2017 Prisión Fatal show was the eight time that IWRG promoted a show under that name and the second time in 2017, after a Prisión Fatal show in January.

=== Storylines ===
The event featured seven professional wrestling matches with different wrestlers involved in pre-existing scripted feuds, plots and storylines. Wrestlers were portrayed as either heels (referred to as rudos in Mexico, those that portray the "bad guys") or faces (técnicos in Mexico, the "good guy" characters) as they followed a series of tension-building events, which culminated in a wrestling match or series of matches.

The main event, the eponymous Prisión Fatal match, saw several separate storylines intersect in the match between Carístico, Black Warrior, Trauma II and Mr. Electro. In 2006 Black Warrior and Carístico, then known as Místico, were embroiled in a major storyline for Consejo Mundial de Lucha Libre (CMLL) that saw Black Warrior win the NWA World Middleweight Championship on May 12, 2006. The storyline led to the two meeting in a Lucha de Apuestas, or "bet match", in the main event of the CMLL 73rd Anniversary Show. Místico defeated Black Warrior, forcing Black Warrior to unmask as a result. On April 29, 2007 Místico regained the NWA World Middleweight Championship to put an end to their storyline feud at the time. On July 2, 2017 Black Warrior and Místico, now working under the ring name Carístico, faced off in one of the featured matches of the 2017 Festival de las Máscaras show where Black Warrior cheated to defeat Carístico to win the match and reignite the feud between the two.

Black Warrior made his first IWRG appearance at the 2017 Rey del Ring show, participating in the main event 30-man match. On subsequent shows Black Warrior worked opposite Mr. Electro as Black Warrior, Trauma I and Trauma II lost to Mr. Electro, Danny Casas and Imposibe. On July 16 Mr. Electro successfully defended the IWRG Intercontinental Heavyweight Championship against Black Warrior. Trauma II and Mr. Electro had been feuding off-and-on ever since the summer of 2016. The storyline started as Trauma defeated Mr. Electro II for the IWRG Intercontinental Heavyweight Championship on August 8, 2016. The two faced off on multiple times, leading up to Mr. Electro regaining the championship on December 18, 2016.

== Results ==
| No. | Results | Stipulations |
|---|---|---|
| 1 | Demonio Infernal defeated Lunatik Xtreme | Best two-out-of-three falls match |
| 2 | Dragon Yuki and Warrior Jr. defeated Kaving and Takle | Tag Team match |
| 3 | Bombero Infernal defeated Eterno | Best two-out-of-three falls match |
| 4 | Argos, Kempo Jr. and Monaguillo defeated Black Dragon, Dinamic Black and Gallo Frances | Tag Team match |
| 5 | El Hijo del Pantera defeated Emperador Azteca | Best two-out-of-three falls match |
| 6 | El Zorro, Villano III Jr. and Villano V Jr. defeated Sharly Rockstar, Imposible and International Pantera | Best two-out-of-three falls match for the Distrito Federal Trios Championship |
| 7 | Carístico defeated Black Warrior; Match also included Trauma II and Mr. Electro | Prisión Fatal Steel cage match |
