= IWRG 3 Cabelleras vs. 3 Cabelleras =

2017 International Wrestling Revolution Group event

- Official poster for the event listing Pirata Morgan Jr. as a participant
- Date: June 25, 2017
- City: Naucalpan, State of Mexico
- Venue: Arena Naucalpan

Event chronology
| ← Previous; Rey del Ring | Next → Festival de las Máscaras |

IWRG Lucha de Apuestas chronology
| ← Previous; February 2017 | Next → August 2017 |

The IWRG 3 Caballera vs. 3 Caballera (Spanish for "3 Hair vs. 3 Hair") show was a major lucha libre event produced and scripted by Mexican professional wrestling promotion International Wrestling Revolution Group (IWRG), that took place on June 25, 2017 in Arena Naucalpan, Naucalpan, State of Mexico, Mexico. The focal point of the Caballera vs. Caballera series of shows is one or more traditional Lucha de Apuestas, or "Bet matches", where all competitors in the match risk their hair on the outcome of the match. The Lucha de Apuestas is considered the most prestigious match type in lucha libre, especially when a wrestlers mask is on the line, but the "hair vs. hair" stipulation is held in almost as high regard.

The main event was planned and advertised as Los Piratas (Pirata Morgan, Pirata Morgan Jr. and El Hijo de Pirata Morgan) taking on Los Oficiales (Oficial 911, Oficial AK-47 and Oficial Fierro) in a Lucha de Apuestas, or hair vs. hair match, where all three members of the losing team would be shaved bald. For unexplained reasons, IWRG had Black Warrior replace Pirata Morgan Jr. on the night of the show. Black Warrior and the remaining Los Piratas won the match, forcing all three Oficiales to have their hair shaved off afterward as lucha libre traditions dictate. The show included six additional matches.

== Background ==
In Lucha libre the wrestling mask holds a sacred place, with the most anticipated and prestigious matches being those where a wrestler's mask is on the line, a so-called Lucha de Apuestas, or "bet match" where the loser would be forced to unmask in the middle of the ring and state their birth name. Winning a mask is considered a bigger accomplishment in lucha libre than winning a professional wrestling championship and usually draws more people and press coverage. Losing a mask is often a watershed moment in a wrestler's career, they give up the mystique and prestige of being an enmascarado (masked wrestler) but usually come with a higher than usual payment from the promoter. By the same token a wrestler betting his hair in a Lucha de Apuestas is seen as highly prestigious, usually a step below the mask match.

== Event ==
The event featured seven professional wrestling matches with different wrestlers involved in pre-existing scripted feuds, plots and storylines. Wrestlers were portrayed as either heels (referred to as rudos in Mexico, those that portray the "bad guys") or faces (técnicos in Mexico, the "good guy" characters) as they followed a series of tension-building events, which culminated in a wrestling match or series of matches.

Due to the absence of Pirata Morgan Jr. for the scheduled main event match several matches had to be changed around. For the fourth match Látigo replaced Cerebro Negro, who was moved up to the semi-main event spot. Látigo, Eterno and Tyson La Bestia proceeded to lose to Dinamic Black, Gallo Frances, and Pantera del Japon in two straight falls. Cerebro Negro replaced Black Warrior, and teamed with Máscara Año 2000 Jr. and Trauma I, to defeat El Hijo de Dos Caras, Imposible, and Veneno by disqualification. During the match, El Hijo de Dos Caras became so frustrated with their opponents' repeated use of underhanded tactics that he wrapped a small steel chain around his hand and hit Máscara Año 2000 Jr., an illegal move that was seen by the referee and thus caused the team to be disqualified.

Rearranging the competitors in the fourth and sixth match allowed IWRG to free up Black Warrior to move him into the main event alongside Pirata Morgan and El Hijo de Pirata Morgan. While not originally advertised for the six-man Lucha de Apuestas, or "bet match", he put his hair on the line along with the two Piratas. The trio faced off against long-time rivals of Los Piratas, a trio known as Los Oficiales ("The Officials", three wrestlers whom all use a "Policeman" ring character; Oficial 911, Oficial AK-47 and Oficial Fierro). In the end El Hijo de Pirata Morgan pinned Oficial AK-47 to take the victory for his team. After the match ended all three Oficiales subjected themselves to have all their hair shaved off by the IWRG barber as dictated by lucha libre traditions.

== Results ==
| No. | Results | Stipulations |
|---|---|---|
| 1 | Tentáculo defeated Power Bull | Singles match |
| 2 | Atomic Star and Lunatic Xtreme defeated Climax Jr. and Shaolin | Tag team match |
| 3 | Alas de Acero and Aramís defeated Metaleón and Picudo Jr. | Tag team match |
| 4 | Dinamic Black, Gallo Frances, and Pantera del Japon defeated Eterno, Látigo, and Tyson La Bestia by disqualification | Six-man tag team match |
| 5 | Heddi Karaoui, Trauma II, and Villano III Jr. defeated Emperador Azteca, El Hijo del Pantera, and Pantera I | Six-man tag team match |
| 6 | Cerebro Negro, Máscara Año 2000 Jr., and Trauma I defeated ElHijo de Dos Caras, Imposible, and Veneno by disqualification | Six-man tag team match |
| 7 | Black Warrior and Los Piratas (Pirata Morgan and El Hijo de Pirata Morgan) defeated Los Oficiales (Oficial 911, Oficial AK-47 and Oficial Fierro) | Six-man Lucha de Apuestas, hair vs. hair match |
