= Ricky Marvin =

Mexican professional wrestler

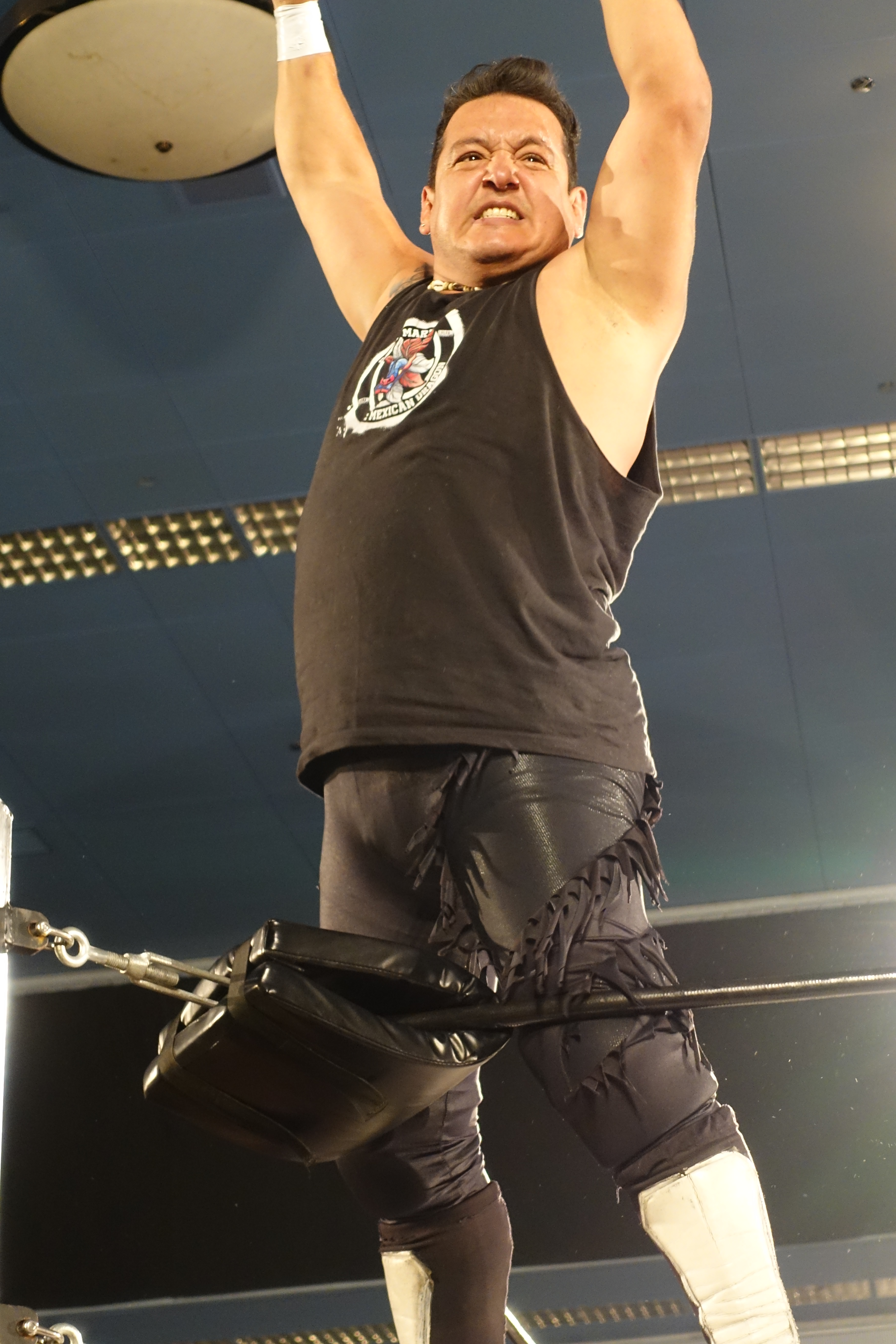
- Marvin in 2023

Personal information
- Born: Ricardo Fuentes Romero; January 8, 1980 (age 46) Veracruz, Veracruz, Mexico

Professional wrestling career
- Ring name(s): Bengala; Black Emperor; Mushiking Joker; Ricky Marvin; White Demon
- Billed height: 1.69 m (5 ft 7 in)
- Billed weight: 79 kg (174 lb)
- Trained by: Aries Ringo Mendoza Negro Casas Memo Diaz
- Debut: April 9, 1995

Ricardo Fuentes Romero (born January 8, 1980) is a Mexican professional wrestler, better known by his ring name Ricky Marvin. He is signed to Lucha Libre AAA Worldwide (AAA) as a trainer and occasional producer. He is most known for his work in the Japanese promotion Pro Wrestling Noah. Between 2005 and 2007, he also wrestled as the masked Mushiking Joker character, a storyline arch-enemy of "Mushiking Terry", who was played by his then-tag team partner Kotaro Suzuki. He also worked as the masked character Bengala in AAA and Lucha Underground between 2013 and 2016.

Suzuki and Ricky Marvin were the first Japanese/foreigner team to win the GHC Junior Heavyweight Tag Team Championship, one of three reigns with that championship. Marvin is also a former GHC Junior Heavyweight Champion in Pro Wrestling Noah, a former CMLL Japan Super Lightweight Champion and Mexican National Lightweight Champion in Consejo Mundial de Lucha Libre (CMLL) and one third of the AAA World Trios Champions in AAA. A second generation wrestler, he is the son of retired professional wrestler Ricardo Fuentes and brother of Rolando Romero.

== Professional wrestling career ==
Ricardo Fuentes was trained for his professional wrestling career by his father Ricardo Fuentes, a professional wrestler known by the ring name Aries, and later on by Ringo Mendoza, Negro Casas and Memo Diaz when he began working for Consejo Mundial de Lucha Libre (CMLL). Fuentes made his debut in 1995, using the ring name White Demon, an enmascarado ("masked") character.

=== Consejo Mundial de Lucha Libre (1998–2003) ===
In 1998, Fuentes began training in the CMLL wrestling school under Mendoza and Casas, where he came up with a new ring name, "Ricky Marvin", combining his first name, Ricky, with his favorite cartoon character, Marvin the Martian. On July 16, 1999, Marvin teamed with Sombra de Plata in a loss to Fugaz and Sangre Azteca; the success of the match earned all four men a standing ovation from the crowd. It also led to a rematch at the CMLL 66th Anniversary Show on September 24, where Marvin and Sombra de Plata were victorious. He took part in the Torneo Gran Alternativa ("Great Alternative Tournament") in December, teaming with his mentor Ringo Mendoza. In the first round, they defeated Apolo Dantés and Alan Stone, but lost to eventual winners El Felino and Tigre Blanco in the second round. On March 17, 2000, Marvin defeated Azteca on the undercard of the Juicio Final ("Final Judgment") pay-per-view. On November 29, Marvin defeated Virus to win the Mexican National Lightweight Championship, holding it until he lost to Loco Max on December 3, 2001.

In 2003, the CMLL group Los Guapos created Guapos U, a "reality show"-inspired storyline in which young hopefuls competed to earn a spot in the Los Guapos group. Marvin was one of the wrestlers selected for the first class of Guapos U. During the storyline, fellow "classmate" Zumbido developed a rivalry with Marvin, which got Zumbido kicked out of the group for fighting. Zumbido and Marvin met in a Lucha de Apuestas ("bet match"), in which both wrestlers put their hair on the line. The match ended in a draw and, as a result, both wrestlers had their hair shaved off after the match. Marvin was the last wrestler eliminated in the Guapos U contest, losing the membership to El Terrible. At the CMLL 70th Anniversary Show on September 19, Marvin teamed with Virus and Volador Jr. to defeat "The Havana Brothers" (Rocco Quance, Puma Boy and Rocky Romero).

=== Japan (1999–2003) ===
Marvin made his Japanese debut on November 21, 1999, defeating Sangre Azteca. While working for CMLL Japan, Marvin defeated Virus to win the CMLL Japan Super Lightweight Championship on August 6, 2000. He held the title once more before the organization ceased operations in early 2001. Marvin returned to Japan on several tours, even after CMLL Japan folded, often working for Último Dragón's Toryumon Japan promotion. In Toryumon, Marvin defeated Super Nova on July 7, 2002, to win the NWA World Welterweight Championship, but lost it to Genki Horiguchi after a 17-day reign. The title win helped convince Marvin that his future lay in Japan.

=== Pro Wrestling Noah (2003–2015) ===
Marvin began working for Pro Wrestling Noah in 2003, often appearing at Pro Wrestling SEM events, Noah's league for younger, inexperienced wrestlers. Over time, Marvin began teaming regularly with Kotaro Suzuki. They wrestled at Departure on July 10, 2004, in a loss to Donovan Morgan and Michael Modest. While teaming with Suzuki, Marvin also began a storyline feud with Suzuki's masked alter ego, "Mushiking Terry", while he wrestled as the masked Mushiking Joker character himself. The two masked characters wrestled off and on between 2005 and 2007, with both men occasionally wrestling unmasked as well.

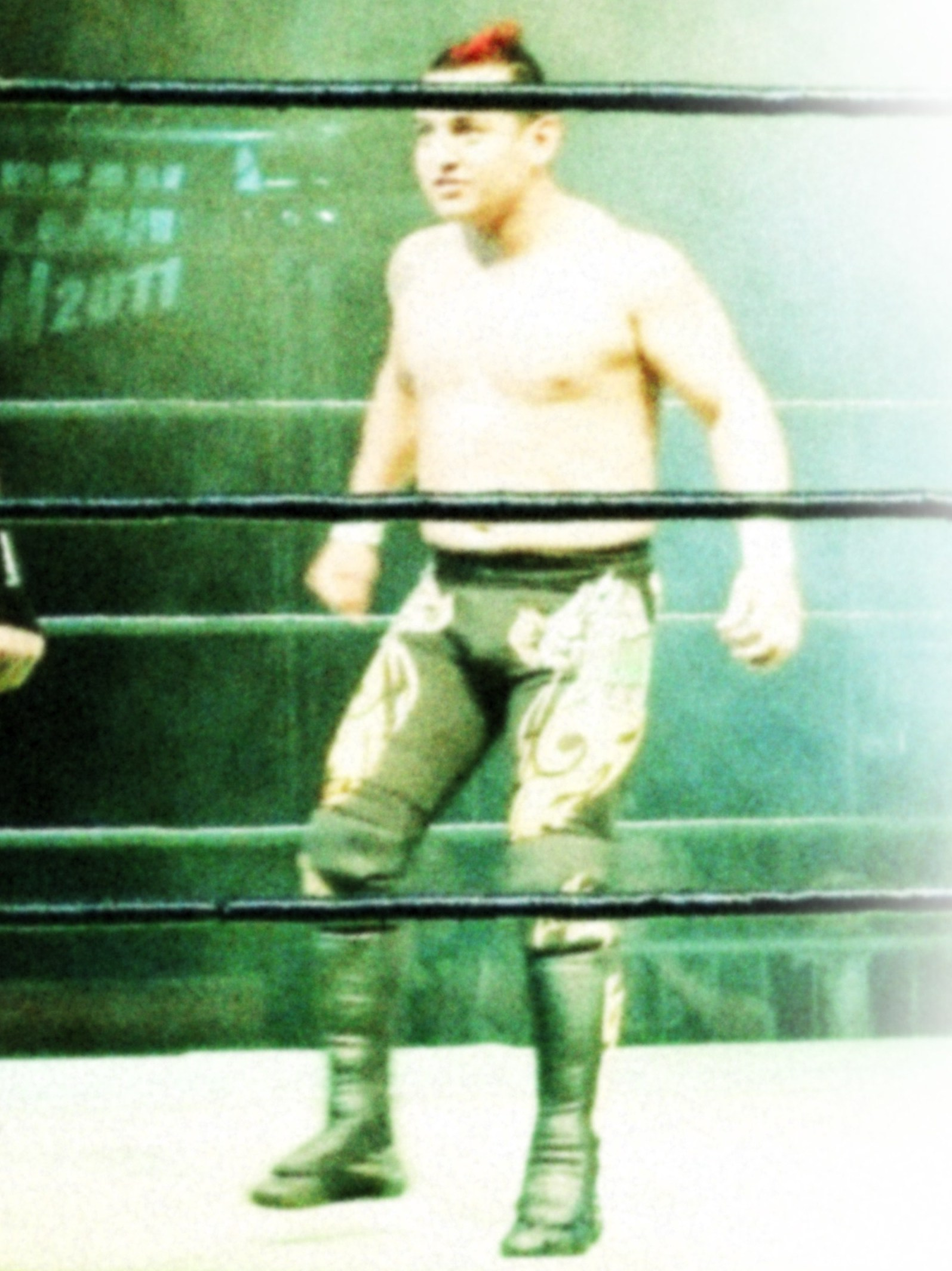
Marvin at a Pro Wrestling Noah event in May 2011

On January 21, 2007, Marvin and Suzuki defeated The Briscoe Brothers (Jay Briscoe and Mark Briscoe) to win the GHC Junior Heavyweight Tag Team Championship, which they lost on November 24 to Naruki Doi and Masato Yoshino. On September 3, Marvin main evented the joint Lucha Libre AAA Worldwide (AAA)/Noah show TripleSEM, where he, Terry and Naomichi Marufuji faced Los Hell Brothers (Cibernético, Charly Manson and Chessman) in a match that ended in a no-contest due to outside interference. In August 2008, Marvin teamed with AAA's Laredo Kid and El Oriental against Histeria, Antifaz and Rocky Romero. In early 2010, after the GHC Junior Heavyweight Tag Team Championship was vacated when Suzuki suffered a knee injury, Marvin and Taiji Ishimori entered a tournament to determine the next champions. They defeated Bobby Fish and Eddie Edwards in the first round and Genba Hirayanagi and Yoshinobu Kanemaru in the finals to win the championship. On August 22, Marvin and Ishimori lost the championship to New Japan Pro-Wrestling (NJPW) representatives Koji Kanemoto and Tiger Mask.

In July 2011, Marvin reunited with his brother Rocky Marvin to take part in the 2011 Nippon TV Cup Jr. Heavyweight Tag League. After one victory and three losses, the team finished last in their block of the tournament. On October 16, Marvin defeated Satoshi Kajiwara to win the vacant GHC Junior Heavyweight Championship for the first time. Immediately after the match, Marvin vacated the title, declaring that he wanted to earn it by defeating Katsuhiko Nakajima, who had been forced to vacate the title due to injury. Nakajima returned on November 27 and defeated Marvin for the vacant GHC Junior Heavyweight Championship. On July 22, 2012, Marvin and Super Crazy, known as Los Mexitosos, defeated Atsushi Aoki and Kotaro Suzuki to win the GHC Junior Heavyweight Tag Team Championship, but lost it to Genba Hirayanagi and Maybach Taniguchi Jr. on March 10, 2013. In July 2013, Los Mexitosos entered the NTV G+ Cup Junior Heavyweight Tag League for the vacant GHC Junior Heavyweight Tag Team Championship. The team won three of their four matches, failing to advance to the finals.

Marvin, under the masked Bengala persona, returned to Noah on July 18, 2015, entering the 2015 Global Junior Heavyweight League. He finished the tournament with a record of three wins and three losses, failing to advance to the finals.

=== Ring of Honor (2007, 2013) ===
Marvin made his Ring of Honor (ROH) debut at Live in Tokyo on July 16, 2007, where he teamed with Atsushi Aoki and Matt Sydal in a loss to Naomichi Marufuji and The Briscoe Brothers. In August 2013, it was announced that he would return to ROH to face Roderick Strong at Death Before Dishonor XII on September 20, as well as Davey Richards the next day. Marvin was defeated in both matches.

=== Lucha Libre AAA Worldwide (2007–2008, 2013–2017) ===
Two weeks after TripleSEM, on September 16, 2007, Marvin traveled to Mexico to team with Latin Lover and La Parka, defeating La Legión Extranjera (Abismo Negro, Kenzo Suzuki, Ron Killings and X-Pac) at Verano de Escandalo ("Summer of Scandal"). Marvin made a further AAA appearance on June 13, 2008, wrestling at Triplemanía XVI as part of the Mexican Powers alongside Crazy Boy and Último Gladiador, defeating La Legión Extranjera (Bryan Danielson, Jack Evans and Teddy Hart) and La Familia de Tijuana (Extreme Tiger, Halloween, and T.J. Xtreme) in a three-way tag team elimination match. On April 15, 2013, Marvin returned to AAA, joining Los Perros del Mal.

On May 2, 2014, Marvin again returned to AAA, working under a mask as the tecnico character "Bengala", with no public acknowledgement that it was Marvin under the mask. He won his first match as Bengala by pinning Los Perros del Mal leader El Hijo del Perro Aguayo in a six-man tag team main event. On June 7, at Verano de Escándalo, Bengala won an eight-way match to advance to the finals of a tournament to determine the number one contender for the AAA Cruiserweight Championship. Bengala received his title shot with eight other challengers on August 17 at Triplemanía XXII, but failed to capture the title, which was won by El Hijo del Fantasma.

In 2016, the Bengala gimmick was taken over by Super Nova, while Fuentes began working as Ricky Marvin once more. He was then paired with Averno and Chessman, forming a new trio called Los OGT. Los OGT won the AAA World Trios Championship on November 4 by defeating Los Xinetes ("The Horsemen"; El Zorro, Dark Cuervo and Dark Scoria). They lost the title to El Apache, Faby Apache and Mary Apache on March 5, 2017, when Marvin was defeated by Faby in a singles match. On October 30, Marvin left AAA.

=== Independent circuit (2018–present) ===
After leaving AAA, Ricky Marvin continued competing on the independent circuit across Mexico and internationally. On March 25, 2018, he headlined the International Wrestling Revolution Group's (IWRG) "Cabellera vs. Cabellera" ("Hair vs. Hair") event in Naucalpan, defeating Dr. Cerebro in a Lucha de Apuestas that resulted in Cerebro being shaved bald. In December, Marvin participated in a WWE tryout in Chile. Marvin made his Major League Wrestling (MLW) debut during a Fusion taping in Tijuana on October 5, 2019, losing to Oraculo and Black Danger in a three-way match that aired on October 12.

Marvin appeared for Game Changer Wrestling (GCW) on May 15, 2021, losing to Jordan Oliver. The following month, Marvin began working as a promoter and launched his own promotion, La Cueva del Dragon ("The Dragon's Cave"), with its first show scheduled to be held on July 31; he would face Bandido in the main event. On August 26, 2022, Bandido defeated Marvin in the finals of a tournament for the Big Lucha World Championship. At Westside Xtreme Wrestling (wXw)'s Drive of Champions event in Oberhausen on June 14, 2025, he lost to Aigle Blanc.

=== Return to AAA (2026–present) ===
On October 26, 2026, it was reported that Marvin signed with AAA as a trainer and occasional producer.

== Personal life ==
Ricardo Fuentes is a second-generation wrestler; his father, Ricardo Fuentes, worked under the ring name "Aries" for many years and had a hand in training Fuentes. His brother, Rolando Fuentes Romero, is also a wrestler; he originally worked as the Mini-Estrella Rocky Marvin, playing off family connection between them, but currently wrestles as Mini Histeria for AAA.

== Championships and accomplishments ==
- Lucha Libre AAA Worldwide
  - AAA World Trios Championship (1 time) – with Averno and Chessman
- Consejo Mundial de Lucha Libre
  - CMLL Japan Super Lightweight Championship (2 times)
  - Mexican National Lightweight Championship (1 time)
- Estudio Wrestling Association
  - EWA World Championship (1 time)
- Imperio Lucha Libre
  - Campeonato Sudamericano de Imperio (1 time)
- Powerslam Wrestling
  - PW Heavyweight Championship (1 time)
- Pro Wrestling Illustrated
  - PWI ranked him #107 of the 500 best singles wrestlers of the PWI 500 in 2007
- Pro Wrestling Noah
  - GHC Junior Heavyweight Championship (1 time)
  - GHC Junior Heavyweight Tag Team Championship (3 times) – with Kotaro Suzuki (1), Taiji Ishimori (1), and Super Crazy (1)
- Toryumon
  - NWA World Welterweight Championship (1 time)
- Universal Wrestling Entertainment
  - UWE Tag Team Championship (1 time) – with Super Crazy
- Xplosion Nacional de Lucha
  - XNL Championship (1 time)
- Xtreme Mexican Wrestling
  - XMW Junior Heavyweight Championship (1 time)

== Luchas de Apuestas record ==
Winner (wager)	Loser (wager)	Location	Event	Date	Notes
Ricky Marvin (hair)	Super Cacao (hair)	Mexico City	Live event	May 28, 2000	(Note: Ricky Marvin and Super Cacao lost a Relevos Suicidas tag team match to Fugaz and Tony Rivera and were forced to wrestle each other)
Ricky Marvin (hair)	El Fiero (hair)	Mexico City	Live event	May 30, 2000	
Ricky Marvin (hair)	El Koreano (hair)	Nezahualcoyotl, Mexico State	Live event	October 15, 2000	
Ricky Marvin (hair)	Américo Rocca (hair)	Mexico City	Live event	May 27, 2001	
Tony Rivera and Ricky Marvin (hair)	El Diablo and Bestia Negra I (hair)	Cuernavaca, Morelos	Live event	August 2001	
Ricky Marvin (hair)	El Hijo del Gladiador (hair)	Mexico City	Live event	October 14, 2001	
Ricky Marvin (hair)	Tony Tijuana (hair)	Nezahualcoyotl, Mexico State	Live event	May 19, 2002	
Ricky Marvin (hair)	Zumbido (hair)	Mexico City	CMLL show	February 14, 2003	(Note: Marvin and Zumbido wrestled to a draw; both wrestlers had their hair shaved off as a result.)
Ricky Marvin (hair)	Gran Bardo (hair)	Acapulco, Guerrero	Live event	November 19, 2003	
Ricky Marvin (hair)	Inazuma Nihon (hair)	Aguascalientes, Aguascalientes	Live event	August 5, 2004	
Tiger Emperor (mask)	Ricky Marvin (hair)	Tokyo, Japan	Encountering Navigation	April 2, 2005	
Ricky Marvin (hair)	Dr. Cerebro (hair)	Naucalpan, State of Mexico	Cabellera vs. Cabellera	March 25, 2018	
