= Ruleta de la Muerte (1999) =

Mexican Professional wrestling show

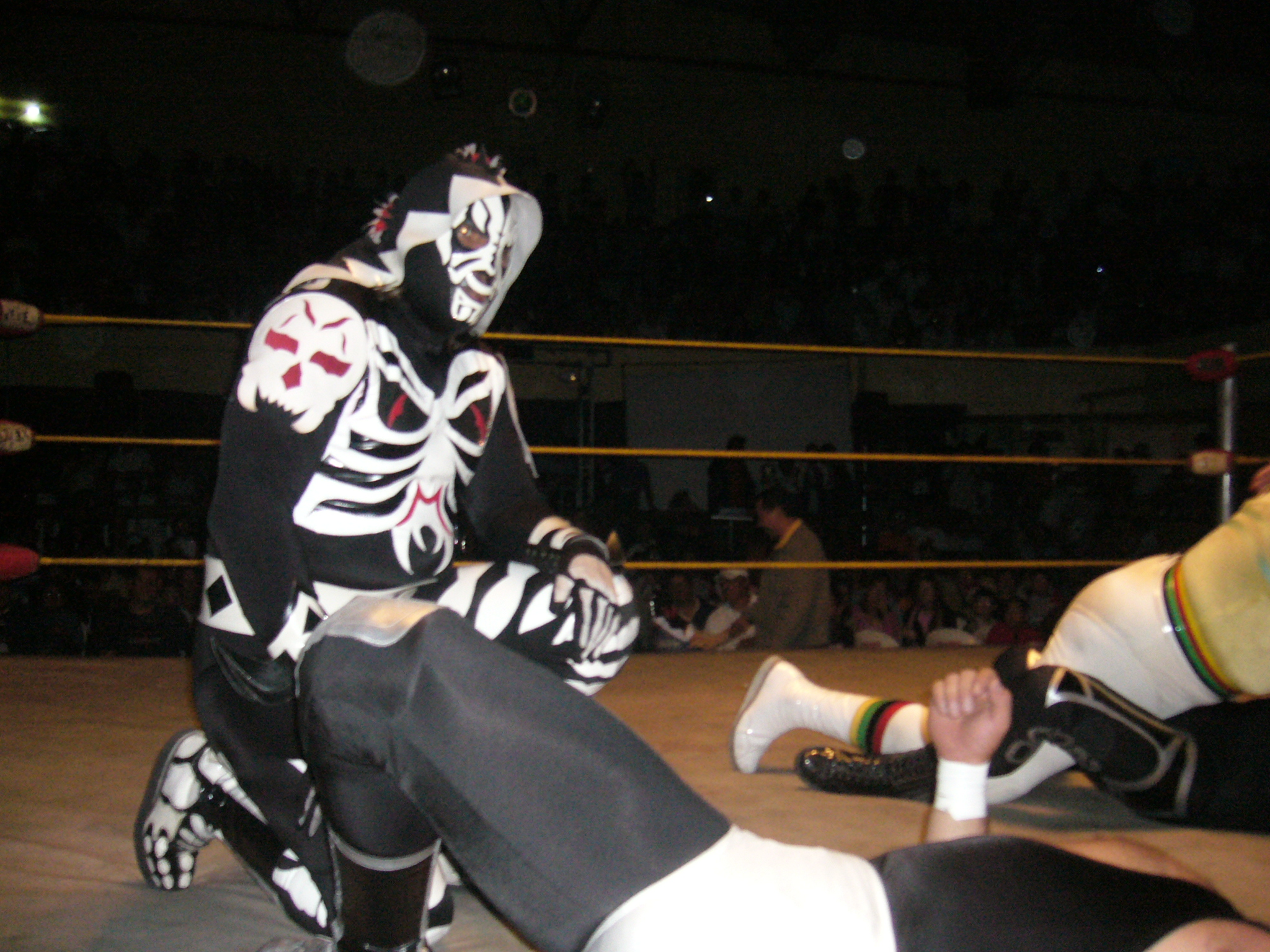
- La Parka, one of 16 men risking their mask at this event
- Promotion: Consejo Mundial de Lucha Libre
- Date: July 18, 1999
- City: Mexico City, Mexico
- Venue: Palacio de los Deportes
- Attendance: 8,000

Pay-per-view chronology
← Previous; 43. Aniversario de Arena México	Next → CMLL 66th Anniversary Show

Ruleta de la Muerte chronology
← Previous; 1998	Next → Last

Ruleta de la Muerte (1999) was a professional wrestling pay-per-view event produced by Consejo Mundial de Lucha Libre (CMLL) that took place on July 18, 1999 in Palacio de los Deportes, Mexico City, Mexico. The show featured the Ruleta de la Muerte¨(Spanish for "Roulette of Death") tournament, in which tag teams face off in a single elimination tournament, but unlike traditional tournaments it is the losing team that advances in the tournament. The losing team in the final match must wrestle each other in a Lucha de Apuestas match, where either their mask or their hair is on the line. The Tournament featured 8 teams, all of them randomly paired the tournament through the elimination order of a battle royal involving all 16 participants. In addition to the battle royal, seven tournament matches and the Lucha de Apuesta match the show also featured two five vs. five elimination matches on the under card.

== Background ==
The event featured 11 professional wrestling matches with different wrestlers involved in pre-existing scripted feuds or storylines. Wrestlers portray either villains (referred to as Rudos in Mexico) or fan favorites (Técnicos in Mexico) as they compete in wrestling matches with pre-determined outcomes.

== Results ==
No.	Results	Stipulations
1	Battle royal ended with elimination order determining teams and first round matches	16-man Battle royal for the Ruleta de la Muerte tournament
2	El Satánico, Zumbido, Valentin Mayo, Virus, and Rencor Latino defeated Starman, Astro Rey Jr., El Oriental, Tigre Blanco and Mr. Águila	10-man torneo cibernetico elimination match
3	Scorpio Jr. and Los Capos (Apolo Dantés, Máscara Año 2000 and Cien Caras) defeated Negro Casas, Super Astro, Emilio Charles Jr., and Brazo de Plata	Best two-out-of-three falls eight-man "Lucha Libre rules" tag team match
4	Villaño III and El Hijo del Santo defeated Shocker and Rey Bucanero	Ruleta de la Muerte quarter final match
5	Mr. Niebla and Tinieblas Jr. defeated La Parka and Fishman	Ruleta de la Muerte quarter final match
6	Fuerza Guerrera and Tinieblas defeated Atlantis and Violencia	Ruleta de la Muerte quarter final match
7	Máscara Sagrada and Último Guerrero defeated Olímpico and Blue Panther	Ruleta de la Muerte quarter final match
8	La Parka and Fishman defeated Shocker and Rey Bucanero	Ruleta de la Muerte semi-final match
9	Atlantis and Violencia defeated Olímpico and Blue Panther	Ruleta de la Muerte semi-final match
10	Olímpico and Blue panther defeated Shocker and Rey Bucanero	Ruleta de la Muerte final match
11	Shocker defeated Rey Bucanero via submission	Lucha de Apuestas, mask vs. mask match
