= Zumbido =

Mexican professional wrestler

Personal information
- Born: José Angel Gracia Paz; November 4, 1974 (age 51) Ciudad Obregón, Sonora, México

Professional wrestling career
- Ring name(s): Águila Negra; Zumbido
- Billed height: 1.73 m (5 ft 8 in)
- Billed weight: 90 kg (198 lb)
- Trained by: Huichol; Tapatio III; Super Astro; El Texano
- Debut: January 1990

José Angel García Paz (born November 4, 1974) is a Mexican professional wrestler, best known under the ring name Zumbido (Spanish for "Buzz"). He has worked for both Consejo Mundial de Lucha Libre (CMLL) and Lucha Libre AAA Worldwide (AAA) throughout his career, but currently works on the Mexican independent circuit. Zumbido is closely associated with the group Los Guapos ("The Handsome Ones"), a group he has been part of both in CMLL and AAA.

== Professional wrestling career ==
José García trained under Huichol, Tapatio III, Super Astro and El Texano before making his professional wrestling debut in 1990. He started out working under the ring name "Águila Negra" ("The Black Eagle"), an enmascarado character. His run as a masked wrestler ended on June 14, 1992, when he lost a Lucha de Apuesta, or bet match, to Magnum. In 1994 he worked a couple of tours for International Wrestling Association of Japan.

=== Consejo Mundial de Lucha Libre (1996–2005) ===
In 1996 Garcia signed on with Consejo Mundial de Lucha Libre (CMLL) and adopted the name "Zumbido" along with a bee-striped black and orange mask and tights. He quickly lost the Zumbido mask in a Lucha de Apuesta against Love Machine II within months of signing with CMLL. A few months after his unmasking he participated in a 16-man tournament for the vacant CMLL World Light Heavyweight Championship, but was defeated in the first round by Ángel Azteca. Over the following years Zumbido worked in the lower half of the rankings, training at CMLL's wrestling school while gaining invaluable in-ring experience. In late 1998 Zumbido teamed up with Bestia Salvaje and Scorpio, Jr. to participate in a tournament for the vacant CMLL World Trios Championship. The team made it all the way to the finals but lost to Black Warrior, Blue Panther and Dr. Wagner, Jr. He made his first "major show" appearance when he teamed up with |El Satánico, Valentin Mayo, Virus, and Rencor Latino to defeat Starman, Astro Rey, Jr., El Oriental, Tigre Blanco and Mr. Águila on the undercard of CMLL's 1999 Ruleta de la Muerte Pay-Per-View event. In 1999 he also participated in his very first Leyenda de Plata tournament, CMLL's most prestigious annual tournament. While he did not win it was an indicator that CMLL had hopes of pushing him up the card.

In 2001 Shocker, Scorpio, Jr. and Bestia Salvaje formed a stable known as Los Guapos ("The Handsome Ones") and invited Zumbido to join the group, but he suffered an injury before he could actually team up with Los Guapos. Upon his return to the ring he teamed up with Violencia, Doctor X, losing to Safari, Olímpico and La Fiera on the undercard of the CMLL Apocalypsis PPV. In 2003 Los Guapos created Guapos U, a "reality show" inspired storyline where young hopefuls competed to earn a spot in the Los Guapos group. During the storyline Zumbido developed a rivalry with fellow Guapo U member Ricky Marvin, a rivalry that got Zumbido kicked out of the group for fighting. Zumbido and Rivera met in a Lucha de Apuesta match where both wrestlers put their hair on the line. The match ended in a draw and as a result both wrestlers had their hair shaved off after the match. Once the storyline with Ricky Marvin ended Zumbido began teaming with Super Crazy, forming a regular tag team. The two teamed up with Alan Stone to participate in a tournament for the vacant Mexican National Trios Championship but lost in the finals to El Felino, Safari and Volador Jr. In early 2004 Zumbido turned on his partner, attacking him after a match to signal his transition to being a Rudo (bad guy). The feud between the two saw Zumbido defeat Super Crazy in a Lucha de Apuesta on April 30, 2004, after which he shaved the hair off Super Crazy's head.

=== AAA (2005–2008) ===
After leaving CMLL Zumbido began working for AAA in 2005, using his ring name since he owned the copyrights to the name. In AAA Zumbido teamed up with Shocker, Scorpio, Jr. and Mini-Estrella El Guapito to form Guapos VIP, a new incarnation of Los Guapos. Zumbido's first appearance at an AAA Pay-Per-View was at the 2005 Verano de Escandalo where he teamed with Hator and Nosawa only to lose to El Ángel, Antifaz del Norte and Estrella Dorada, Jr. On January 26, 2006, Zumbido won a tournament to become the next Mexican National Middleweight Champion. defeating Histeria in the finals.

At the 2006 Rey de Reyes Guapos VIP represented by Shocker, Scorpio, Jr. and Zumbido, participated in the main event of the evening, a 12-man Elimination match for the Rey de Reyes trophy. Guapos VIP were the first team eliminated when Shocker was counted out. Not long after the Rey de Reyes event Guapos VIP added Alan Stone to the group. At Triplemanía XIV Guapos VIP lost to the team of El Ángel, El Intocable, Octagón and Vampiro, after which Shocker left AAA. After Shocker left Guapos VIP began a feud with Brazo de Plata, also known as "Super Porky" as they considered him "too hideous to touch", that feud, saw Guapos VIP defeat Brazo de Plata, El Intocable, El Oriental and El Zorro) at the 2006 Verano de Escandalo PPV. In early 2007 Zumbido and Alan Stone teamed up to participate in a tournament to determine the first ever AAA World Tag Team Champions. The team qualified for the finals at the 2007 Rey de Reyes show, but lost to The Black Family (Dark Cuervo and Dark Ozz)) in a match that also included The Mexican Powers (Crazy Boy and Joe Líder) and Real Fuerza Aérea (Pegasso and Super Fly). Over the summer of 2007 Alan Stone turned on Guapos VIP and formed his own group Los Bello Stones along with his brothers Chris Stone and Super Caló, forming a group with a similar "metrosexual" gimmick as Guapos VIP. Los Guapos brought in Decnnis to even the sides between the two groups. At Verano de Escandalo 2007 Guapos VIP defeated Los Bello Stones in one of the featured matches of the night. The highlight of the feud between Guapos VIP and Los Bello Stone came at the 2007 Guerra de Titanes where the two groups clashed in a Steel Cage Match under Lucha de Apuesta rules. Zumbido was the first man to escape the cage and was forced to watch as Scorpio, Jr. had to have his hair shaved off as a result of losing the match for Guapos VIP.

=== Independent circuit (2008–present) ===
In 2008 Zumbido and Scorpio, Jr. left AAA in 2008 as they were unhappy with how little they got paid. Originally both Decnnis and El Guapito left AAA as well, announcing that Los Guapos was now an independent grup. Within a few days of announcing that they were leaving AAA Decnnis and Guapito returned to AAA. Following the return to AAA of Decnnis and Guapito and an injury to Scorpio, Jr. Los Guapos disbanded with both Zumbido and Scorpio, Jr. focusing on their singles careers. Zumbido has stated that he would like to return to CMLL and has been in negotiations with the company but nothing has come of it yet. While on the Independent circuit Zumbido has worked both for International Wrestling Revolution Group (IWRG) and Perros del Mal Producciones, On March 20, 2009, Zumbido promoted his own wrestling event called Zumbimania where he lost a Lucha de Apuesta to El Intocable in the main event.

== Championships and accomplishments ==
- AAA

- Mexican National Middleweight Championship (1 time)

- Costa del Pacifico

- Costa del Pacifico Middleweight Championship (1 time)

- North Area Wrestling Association

- NAWA Middleweight Championship (1 time)

- Pro Wrestling Illustrated

- PWI ranked him # 148 of the 500 best singles wrestlers of the PWI 500 in 1999

== Luchas de Apuestas record ==
Winner (wager)	Loser (wager)	Location	Event	Date	Notes
Magnum (mask)	Águila Negra (mask)	Tijuana, Baja California	Live event	June 14, 1992	
Transformer (mask) and The King (hair)	Águila Negra (mask) and Siniestro (hair)	Naucalpan, Mexico State	Live event	December 19, 1993	
Zumbido (mask)	Johnny Bayoni (hair)	Tijuana, Baja California	Live event	Unknown	
Zumbido (mask)	Yago (hair)	N/A	Live event	N/A	
Zumbido (mask)	El Renegado (hair)	Mexico City	Live event	November 1995	
Love Machine II (mask)	Zumbido (mask)	Mexico City	Live event	March 14, 1996	
Zumbido (hair)	Mosco de la Merced (hair)	Aguascalientes, Aguascalientes	Live event	July 6, 2001	
Damián 666 (hair)	Zumbido (hair)	Tijuana, Baja California	Live event	September 28, 2001	(Note: Last two men in a cage match that also included La Familia de Mexicali, Halloween, Rey Misterio, Scorpio, Jr. and Bestia Salvaje.)
Zumbido (hair)	Bobby Jack (hair)	Puebla, Puebla	Live event	January 20, 2003	
Draw	Zumbido (hair); Ricky Marvin (hair)	Mexico City	Live event	February 14, 2003	(Note: They wrestled to a draw, both wrestlers lost their hair.)
Zumbido (hair)	Super Crazy (hair)	Mexico City	48. Aniversario de Arena México	April 30, 2004	
Zumbido and Super Brazo (hair)	Brazo de Platino and Crazy 33 (hair)	Cuernavaca, Morelos	Live event	July 1, 2004	
Zumbido (hair)	Tony Rivera (hair)	Cuernavaca, Morelos	Live event	November 4, 2004	
Alan Stone and Zumbido (hair)	Loco Max and Mr. México (hair)	Mexico City	Live event	November 19, 2004	
El Intocable (hair)	Zumbido (hair)	N/A	Live event	2009	(Note: This was a Ruleta en Jaula match with El Intocable and Zumbido as the last two men in the cage.)
El Intocable (hair)	Zumbido (hair)	San Juan Pantitlan	Live event	March 20, 2009	
