= Shocker (wrestler) =

Mexican professional wrestler (born 1971)

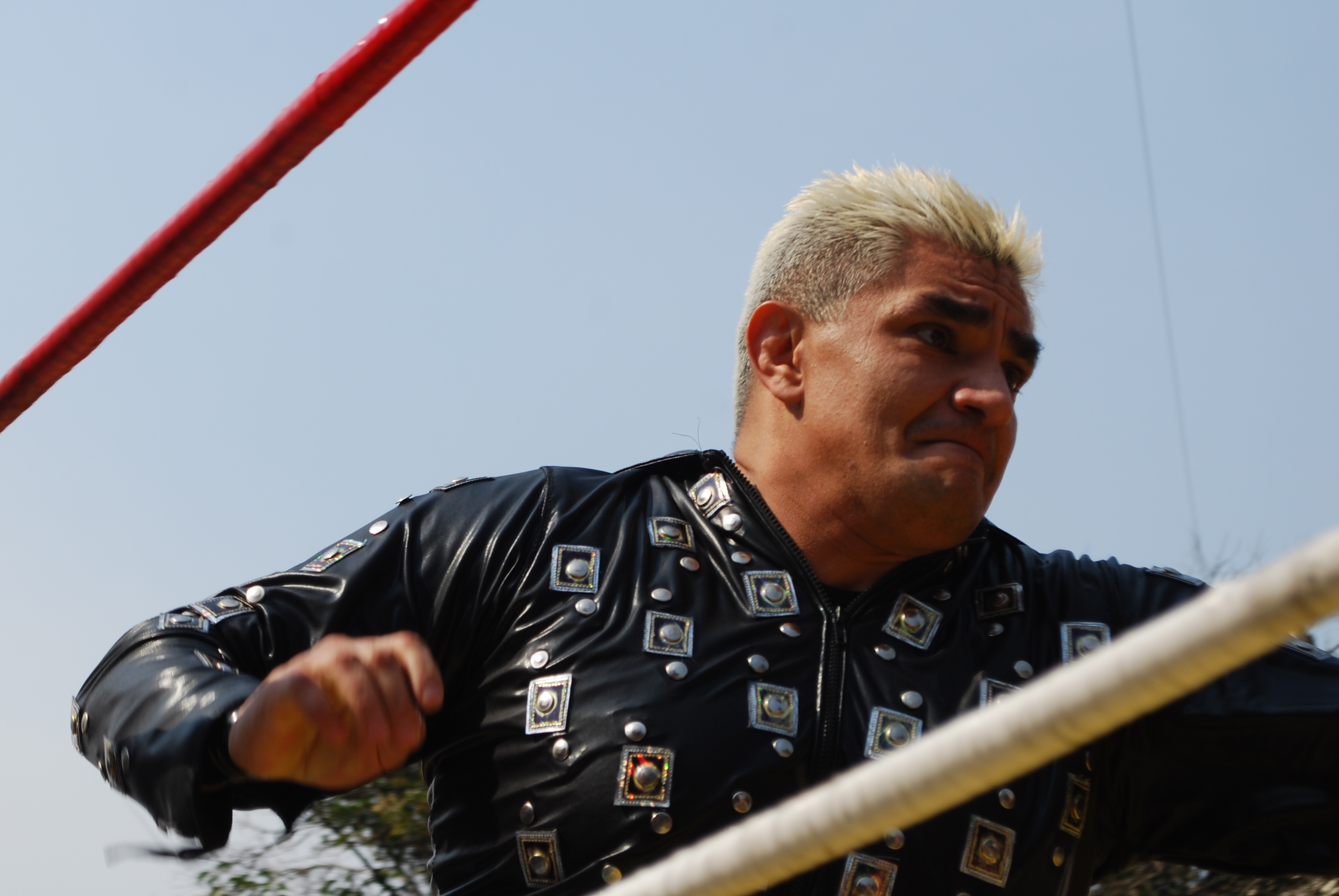
- Shocker during an outdoor event in 2013

Personal information
- Born: José Luis Jair Soria; September 12, 1971 (age 55) Guadalajara, Jalisco, Mexico

Professional wrestling career
- Ring name(s): Shocker; Super Shocker
- Billed height: 1.80 m (5 ft 11 in)
- Billed weight: 98 kg (216 lb)
- Billed from: Los Angeles, California
- Trained by: Diablo Velasco; Flash; El Satánico; Rubén Soria
- Debut: October 16, 1992
- Retired: February 1, 2023

José Luis Jair Soria (born September 12, 1971), best known under the ring name Shocker, is a Mexican retired professional wrestler. He is best known for his tenure with Consejo Mundial de Lucha Libre (CMLL). He has previously worked for AAA in Mexico, Total Nonstop Action Wrestling (TNA) in the United States and New Japan Pro-Wrestling (NJPW) in Japan. Soria is a second-generation professional wrestler; his father, Rubén Soria, was an active wrestler from 1963 to the 1970s.

Working as Shocker, he has held the CMLL World Tag Team Championship on three occasions with Negro Casas, Mr. Niebla and L.A. Park. He is also a former holder of the CMLL World Light Heavyweight Championship, the NWA World Light Heavyweight Championship (twice) and the NWA World Historic Light Heavyweight Championship. He has won the Gran Alternativa tournament in 1995, the Copa de Arena México in 2001, La Copa Junior in 2005 and the Copa Revolución Mexicana in 2011. Shocker holds several Luchas de Apuestas ("bet match") victories over Máscara Año 2000, Tarzan Boy, Vampiro Canadiense, Halloween, Kenzo Suzuki, Marco Corleone, Emilio Charles Jr., Bestia Salvaje, Mazada, Nosawa, Sangre Chicana, Rey Bucanero and Black Warrior.

He is talked about in the Netflix movie Lucha Mexico. He appears in the first season of An Idiot Abroad, where Karl Pilkington was sent by show producers Ricky Gervais and Stephen Merchant to Mexico to see one of the Seven Wonders of the World, Chichen Itza. While he was there, he was tasked with learning how to wrestle; Soria was his trainer.

== Professional wrestling career ==
José Luis Jair received his initial professional wrestling training from highly respected trainer Diablo Velasco, as well as his father, Ruben Soria, prior to his in-ring debut. He worked his first match on October 16, 1992, using the ring name Shocker, an masked wrestler. He later trained under then-Consejo Mundial de Lucha Libre (CMLL) lead trainer El Satánico.

=== Consejo Mundial de Lucha Libre (1994–2005) ===
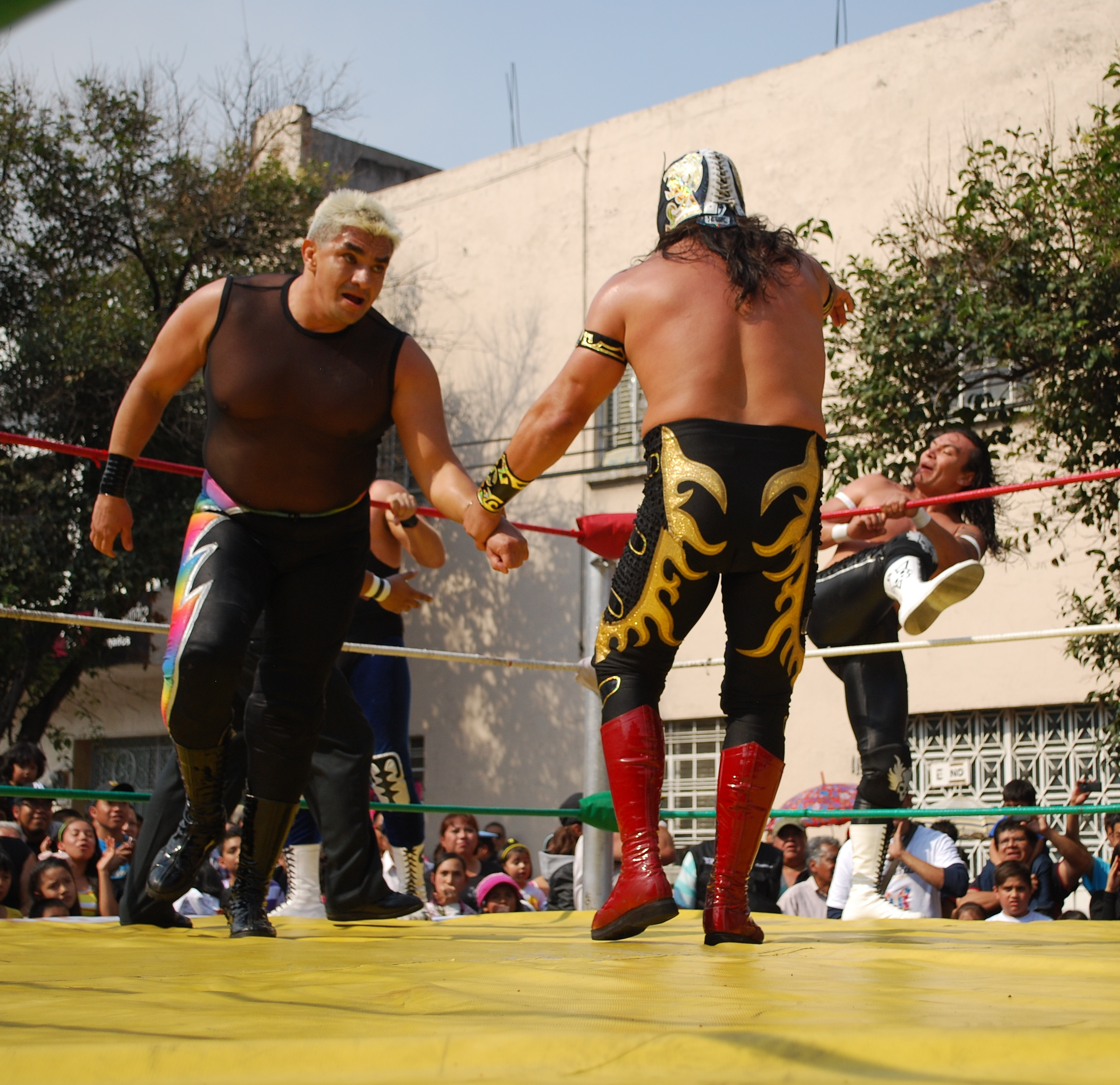
Shocker with Último Guerrero at a community event in Colonia Obrera sponsored by Fundación Expresa

Shocker began working for CMLL in 1994 and slowly received a push from the promoters, who paired him with Silver King for the 1995 Gran Alternativa ("Great Alternative") tournament, which they won. He capped off the year by defeating veteran Kahoz for his mask in a Lucha de Apuestas ("bet match") on December 15. The push continued in 1997, as he defeated Black Warrior on May 4 to capture the NWA World Light Heavyweight Championship. On January 23, 1998, Shocker and Mr. Niebla defeated Emilio Charles Jr. and Dr. Wagner Jr. to win the CMLL World Tag Team Championship. The two later had the championship taken away from them when Mr. Niebla suffered a severe injury. The following year, Shocker's career was further elevated when he turned heel and began a storyline feud with Mr. Niebla. The feud culminated in a match at the CMLL 66th Anniversary Show on September 24, 1999, where Shocker and Mr. Niebla were paired up for a Parejas Suicidas ("Suicide Pairs") match against another pair of feuding partners, Atlantis and Villano III. The rules were that the losing team had to face each other immediately after losing the match in a mask vs. mask match. Shocker and Niebla lost the match, and Shocker lost the subsequent Lucha de Apuesta match, losing his mask as a result.

After losing his mask, Shocker was pushed even more, capitalizing on his good looks and being nicknamed "1000% Guapo" or "1000% Handsome". He paired with Bestia Salvaje and Scorpio Jr. to form Los Guapos ("The Handsome Ones") in 2000. Shocker later had a falling out with his tag team partners, and he had a heel vs. heel feud along with partners like Los Capos (Cien Caras, Universo 2000 and Máscara Año 2000) and El Satánico. In 2003, he started a new version of Los Guapos with frequent tag team partner Máscara Mágica and El Terrible, feuding with original Guapos members Bestia Salvaje, Scorpio Jr. and Emilio Charles Jr., who were now wrestling as Los Talibanes ("The Taliban"). The feud peaked in a six-man cage match where El Terrible defeated Bestia Salvaje, forcing him to be shaved bald as a result. By 2004, Shocker was a full-time babyface, teaming with L.A. Park and trading the CMLL World Tag Team Championship with Último Guerrero and Rey Bucanero. In June of that year, El Terrible broke away from Los Guapos and won the hair of Máscara Mágica. Terrible's replacement, Alan Stone, hardly teamed with Shocker and Máscara Mágica afterward, and Los Guapos was effectively ended by the end of 2004. For most of the summer, he joined Perro Aguayo Jr. and Negro Casas in a feud against Pierroth Jr., Vampiro Canadiense and Tarzan Boy, which ended in a steel cage match that saw Perro Aguayo Jr. defeat Casas for his hair. In 2005, Shocker won the La Copa Junior ("The Junior Cup"), a trophy for second-generation wrestlers, by defeating Dr Wagner Jr. in the finals.

=== New Japan Pro-Wrestling (1999–2001) ===
Working as Super Shocker, he traveled to Japan for the first time and made his debut for New Japan Pro-Wrestling (NJPW) on April 13, 1999, teaming with Koji Kanemoto to defeat Gran Hamada and Kendo Kashin. The following month, he competed in the Best of the Super Juniors tournament as part of Block A. He finished the tournament at the bottom of his block, scoring only two points after four losses and one win over Tatsuhito Takaiwa, failing to advance to the finals. Super Shocker returned to NJPW in May 2001 to compete in that year's edition of the Best of the Super Juniors. He scored six points after three wins and two losses, again failing to advance to the finals.

=== Total Nonstop Action Wrestling (2005–2006) ===
On March 13, 2005, Shocker made his debut for the Orlando, Florida-based Total Nonstop Action Wrestling (TNA) at the Destination X pay-per-view, saving Chris Sabin from an attack by Chris Candido and The Naturals (Andy Douglas and Chase Stevens). At Lockdown on April 24, he defeated Sabin, Matt Bentley and Sonjay Dutt in TNA's inaugural Xscape match, earning a TNA X Division Championship match against Christopher Daniels at Hard Justice on May 15, where he failed to win the title. At Slammiversary on June 19, he defeated Alex Shelley. Shocker then participated in the 2005 TNA Super X Cup Tournament, but lost to Shelley in the first round on the July 29 episode of Impact!, as well as in a rematch at Sacrifice on August 14. Following the event, he teamed with Sabin as part of the Chris Candido Memorial Tag Team Tournament, defeating Mikey Batts and Simon Diamond in the first round and Ron Killings and Dutt in the semi-finals, before losing to Shelley and Sean Waltman in the finals.

Shocker was scheduled to wrestle Sabin at Unbreakable on September 11, but was pulled from the event due to an AAA booking commitment and was replaced by Petey Williams. In early 2006, TNA brought back Shocker as the captain of Team Mexico, which also included Puma, Magno and Incognito, for the 2006 TNA World X Cup Tournament. Shocker and Magno defeated Team Canada's Eric Young and Johnny Devine, but in the end, the team came in third in the standings after being unsuccessful in the World X Cup finals at Sacrifice on May 14.

=== AAA (2005–2006) ===
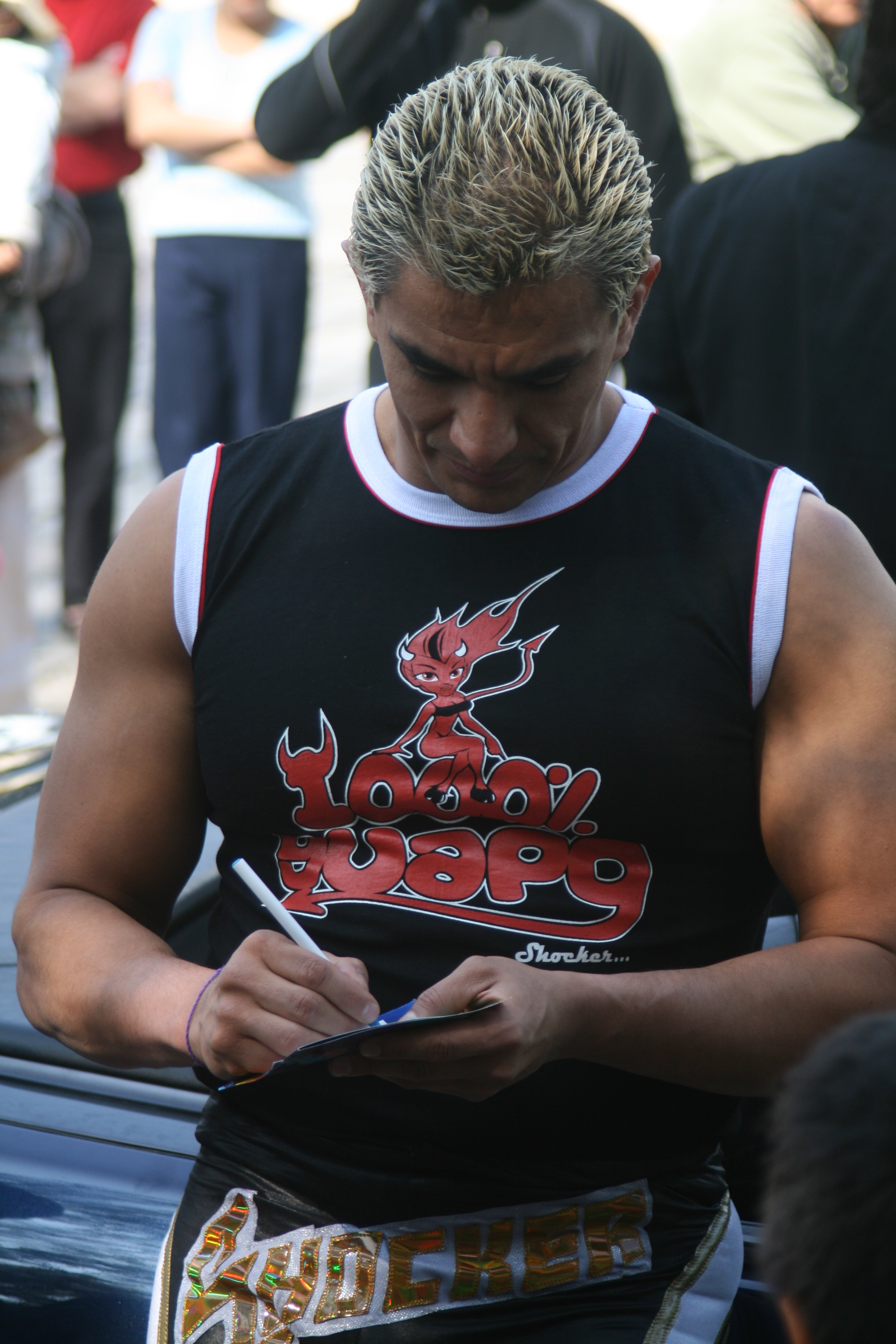
Shocker signing an autograph.

While working for TNA, Shocker left CMLL to work for their Mexican rival promotion, AAA. He began a feud with Cibernético, who attacked Shocker's father when he was at ringside for one of Shocker's matches. The feud reached its high point in the main event of Verano de Escándalo ("Summer of Scandal") on September 18, a four-way Lucha de Apuestas that included Shocker, Cibernético, Latin Lover and Chessman; the match was a steel cage match with the added stipulation that the cage was supposedly electrified. Chessman lost the match to Latin Lover, while Shocker escaped without losing his hair. Shocker subsequently turned rudo by attacking veteran Sangre Chicana, claiming that he was the real Amo de Escandalo ("Master of Scandal"), which was Chicana's nickname at that point. On December 10, at Guerra de Titanes ("War of the Titans"), Shocker defeated Chicana in a hair vs. hair match.

In 2006, Shocker formed Los Guapos VIP with Scorpio Jr. and Zumbido. They participated in a four-way trios match on March 10 at Rey de Reyes ("King of Kings"), but were eliminated before the end of the match. Los Guapos later expanded with Alan Stone, allowing them to unsuccessfully challenge The Black Family (Chessman, Dark Ozz, Dark Cuervo and Dark Escoria) for the Mexican National Atómicos Championship on March 19. In August, Shocker left AAA.

=== Return to CMLL (2006–2022) ===
Shocker returned to CMLL in September 2006, a month after his AAA departure. At the CMLL 73rd Anniversary Show on September 29, he and Los Perros del Mal (Perro Aguayo Jr. and Héctor Garza) failed to win the vacant CMLL World Trios Championship, losing to Atlantis, Tarzan Boy and Último Guerrero. In early 2007, he entered a tournament for the vacant NWA International Junior Heavyweight Championship, but lost to Hirooki Goto in the finals on March 4. He and Dr. Wagner Jr. lost to Perro Aguayo Jr. and Garza in a match for the vacant WWA World Tag Team Championship on January 31, 2008. On December 14, 2010, Shocker defeated El Texano Jr. to win the NWA World Historic Light Heavyweight Championship. However, just five days later, he suffered a patellar tendon rupture and a meniscal tear in his knee that required surgery and would sideline him for 12 to 16 weeks. On May 26, 2011, Shocker was stripped of the title.

After making his in-ring return on July 24, Shocker briefly formed a new group with Metro, Titán and Tritón on November 16. In late 2012, the long-dormant rivalry between Shocker and his former tag-team partner Mr. Niebla rose to the surface again as the two began to work on opposite sides in a number of matches. As such, the two were paired up for the 2013 Torneo Nacional de Parejas Increibles ("National Incredible Pairs Tournament"). In the initial rounds, they defeated the teams of Marco Corleone and Kraneo and Máscara Dorada and Mephisto to qualify for the semi-finals, where they lost to eventual tournament winners La Sombra and Volador Jr. Following the loss, Shocker and Mr. Niebla argued and almost came to blows over who was responsible for losing the match. On July 19, at Infierno en el Ring ("Inferno in the Ring"), Shocker won Mr. Águila's hair in a ten-man steel cage Lucha de Apuestas.

In early 2014, Shocker turned rudo, just so he could feud with Rush. On March 21, at Homenaje a Dos Leyendas, Shocker lost his hair for the first time after being defeated by Rush in a Lucha de Apuestas. On June 13, Shocker and Negro Casas defeated Rush and La Máscara to win the CMLL World Tag Team Championship. On April 3, 2015, Shocker, El Terrible and Rey Bucanero formed a new trio named TGR (Terriblemente Guapo y un Rey, "Terribly Handsome King"). In early 2016, Shocker suffered an injury that would require surgery and keep him out of the ring for almost six months. CMLL opted to not strip Shocker and Casas of the tag team championship during the long period of inactivity, which meant that there was eight months between the team defending the championship. Shocker and Casas successfully defended the championship against Atlantis and Diamante Azul (the former Metro) on June 5, La Máscara and Sharlie Rockstar on July 18, and Místico and Volador Jr. on September 19. During a press conference on February 7, 2018, CMLL announced that the CMLL World Tag Team Championship were vacated due to a lack of defences since 2016.

On March 6, 2020, Shocker and Bucanero participated in a tournament for the Mexican National Tag Team Championship, defeating Audaz and Fugaz in the first round, but lost to El Felino and Tiger in the quarter-finals. Shocker wrestled his final match in CMLL on November 20 and, after a year of inactivity, announced his departure from the promotion on January 30, 2022.

== Personal life ==
Shocker has struggled extensively with alcoholism and substance abuse problems, having been arrested multiple times.

== Championships and accomplishments ==
- Arena Pista

- Arena Pista Revolucion New Wave Tournament (1994)

- Comisión de Box y Lucha de Guadalajara

- Occidente Light Heavyweight Championship (1 time)
- Occidente Trios Championship (1 time) – with León Dorado and Ídolo I

- Consejo Mundial de Lucha Libre

- CMLL World Light Heavyweight Championship (1 time)
- CMLL World Tag Team Championship (3 times) – with Mr. Niebla (1), L.A. Park (1), and Negro Casas (1)
- NWA World Light Heavyweight Championship (2 times) (Note: Despite not being a member of the National Wrestling Alliance since 1990 CMLL promotes three "NWA-Branded" titles that are not officially recognized by the NWA.)
- NWA World Historic Light Heavyweight Championship (1 time)
- Copa de Arena México (2001) – with Black Warrior and Apolo Dantés
- La Copa Junior (2005)
- Copa Revolución Mexicana (2011) / Trofeo Revolucion 101 (2011)
- Torneo Gran Alternativa (1995) – with Silver King

- International Wrestling Revolution Group

- Copa Higher Power (1998) – with Mr. Niebla, El Pantera, El Solar, Star Boy and Mike Segura

- Pro Wrestling Illustrated

- PWI ranked him # 16 of the 500 best singles wrestlers of the PWI 500 in 2002

== Luchas de Apuestas record ==
Winner (wager)	Loser (wager)	Location	Event	Date	Notes
Shocker (mask)	Valentin Mayo (hair)	Guadalajara, Jalisco	house show	1994	
Shocker (mask)	Cain (hair)	Guadalajara, Jalisco	house show	January, 1995	
Shocker (mask)	Kahoz (mask)	Mexico City	house show	December 15, 1995	
Shocker (mask)	Rey Bucanero (mask)	Mexico City	Ruleta de la Muerte	July 17, 1999	(Note: Finals of a Ruleta de la Muerte, losers advance tournament)
Mr. Niebla (mask)	Shocker (mask)	Mexico City	CMLL 66th Anniversary Show	September 24, 1999	(Note: Lost a Relevos suicidas match to Atlantis and Villano III and had to wrestle each other.)
Shocker (hair)	Rambo (hair)	Obregón, Sonora	house show	2000	
Shocker (hair)	Emilio Charles Jr. (hair)	Mexico City	Sin Piedad	December 14, 2001	
Los Guapos (hair) (Shocker and Máscara Mágica)	Tokyo Gurentai (hair) (Takemura and Masada)	Mexico City	house show	May 21, 2002	
Shocker (hair)	Vampiro (hair)	Mexico City	47. Aniversario de Arena México	April 4, 2003	
Shocker (hair)	Máscara Año 2000 (hair)	Puebla, Puebla	house show	July 14, 2003	
Shocker (hair)	Tarzan Boy (hair)	Mexico City	CMLL 70th Anniversary Show	September 19, 2003	
Shocker (hair)	Scorpio Jr. (hair)	Guadalajara, Jalisco	house show	March 21, 2004	(Note: Last two men in a Los Guapos vs. Scorpio Jr., Emilio Charles Jr. and Bestia Salvaje cage match.)
Shocker (hair)	Scorpio Jr. (hair)	Toluca, Mexico State	house show	July 3, 2004	(Note: Finals of a Torneo cibernetico that also featured Pierroth Jr., Rey Bucanero, El Terrible, Héctor Garza, Tarzan Boy and Emilio Charles Jr.)
Shocker (hair)	Bestia Salvaje (hair)	Ciudad Madero, Tamaulipas	house show	September 25, 2004	(Note: Last two men in a cage match that also included Zumbido, Negro Casas, El Terrible and Máscara Mágica.)
Shocker (hair)	Halloween (hair)	Tijuana, Baja California	house show	September 10, 2004	
Shocker (hair)	Violencia (hair)	N/A	house show	March 31, 2005	
Shocker (hair)	Sangre Chicana (hair)	Guadalajara, Jalisco	Guerra de Tianes	December 10, 2005	
Shocker and Universo 2000 (hair)	Marco Corleone and Kenzo Suzuki (hair)	Mexico City	Sin Piedad	December 15, 2006	
Lizmark Jr. and Shocker (hair)	Rey Bucanero and Black Warrior (hair)	Mexico City	Sin Piedad	December 12, 2007	
Shocker (hair)	Mr. Águila (hair)	Mexico City	Infierno en el Ring	July 19, 2013	(Note: Ten-man steel cage match, which also included Averno, Blue Panther, Máximo, Negro Casas, Rey Bucanero, Rey Escorpión, Rush and Brazo de Plata.)
Rush (hair)	Shocker (hair)	Mexico City	Homenaje a Dos Leyendas	March 21, 2014	
