= Black Warrior (wrestler) =

Mexican professional wrestler (1969–2023)

Personal information
- Born: Jesús Toral López; January 7, 1969 Torreón, Coahuila, Mexico
- Died: January 10, 2023 (aged 54)

Professional wrestling career
- Ring name(s): Bali; Black Panther; Black Warrior; Bronce; Camorra; Destroyer; Dragón de Oro; La Máscara; Super Star; Vegas (I)
- Billed height: 1.75 m (5 ft 9 in)
- Billed weight: 85 kg (187 lb)
- Billed from: Gómez Palacio, Durango, Mexico
- Trained by: Asterión; Halcón Suriano; Blue Panther
- Debut: January 22, 1984

Jesús Toral López (January 7, 1969 – January 10, 2023) was a Mexican professional wrestler, who worked almost exclusively in his country. López achieved his most success under the ring name Black Warrior. He was best known for his work for Consejo Mundial de Lucha Libre (CMLL) between 1995 and 2013, as well for his work in some independent promotions, highlighting his time at the Arena Mamá Lucha-S. Being a coach of this sport, he served as a teacher in the Arena Mamá Lucha-S promotion.

Over the years Black Warrior had played both the rudo (the Spanish term used for the villains in wrestling) and técnico (the Spanish term used for the good guys in wrestling). Before assuming the "Black Warrior" ring persona, López worked for almost a decade under various ring personas, generally with little success. His only previous ring persona of note was that of "Bronce" (Spanish for Bronze) where he was a part of the "Los Metalicos" team, a team that was popular in the early 1990s, teaming with Oro and Plata. López was the nephew of Luchador Blue Panther, the son-in-law of Mano Negra and the brother-in-law of Mano Negra Jr.

== Life and career ==
=== Beginnings and first gimmicks (1984–1996) ===
López made his professional wrestling debut In January 1984 in Gómez Palacio, Durango under the masked ring persona "Destroyer". In 1985 López began working for Empresa Mexicana de la Lucha Libre (EMLL, later renamed Consejo Mundial de Lucha Libre, CMLL) where he worked as "Camorra", another masked persona. He worked for EMLL from 1985 until 1988 without achieving much success. In 1988 he left EMLL and joined the Universal Wrestling Association (UWA), EMLL's main Mexican competitor, where he worked as La Máscara (Spanish for "the Mask") for three years, still with limited success. (Note: Many wrestlers have worked under the generic name of "La Máscara", López is not related to the current La Máscara.) In 1991 he returned to EMLL, now renamed CMLL, where he got his first big break; López was given the ring persona of Bronze (Bronce) and teamed up with the popular duo of Oro and Plata to form a trio called Los Metalicos (the Metals). Teaming with Oro and Plata, López won his first wrestling championship when they won the Distrito Federal Trios Championship early in 1992. The trio held the title for almost a year before being defeated by Los Guerreros del Futuro (Damain El Guerrero, Guerrero Del Futuro, and Guerrero Maya). When then CMLL booker Antonio Peña left CMLL to form his own promotion Asistencia Asesoría y Administración (AAA) López was one of the wrestlers who left CMLL with him. Peña had hoped to sign all three Metalicos but in the end only López jumped so Peña was forced to "repackage" him with a new ring persona. From 1992 to 1995 López worked for AAA under various gimmicks such as "Super Star", "Drágon de Oro" (Golden Dragon), "Bali" and "Vegas", but did not achieve the same success as he had as "Bronce". In 1995 he returned to CMLL, in a deal brokered by his uncle who wrestled for CMLL as Blue Panther. López became "Black Panther" and teamed up with his uncle and other "Lagunero" area wrestlers laying the foundation for a group that would later become known as "Ola Lagunero" (the Lagunero Wave).

=== Success as Black Warrior (1996–2008) ===
In May 1996 López changed ring personas once again as he became "Black Warrior", a bad guy (called a rudo in Spanish) who teamed with his uncle Blue Panther and other Lagunero workers such as Dr. Wagner Jr. With the new image came success, as on October 15, Black Warrior defeated El Dandy to win the NWA World Light Heavyweight Championship, his first singles championship. In 1997 Warrior, Panther, and Dr. Wagner Jr. almost won the CMLL World Trios Championship, but lost in the finals of the tournament to crown new champions. Warrior briefly parted with the NWA World Light Heavyweight Title when Shocker beat him in May 1997 but regained it in March 1998. On December 18, 1998, the team of Warrior, Panther, and Wagner, Jr. finally won the CMLL World Trios Championship after several attempts when they defeated Bestia Salvaje, Scorpio Jr., and Zumbido to win the vacant title. The team, billed as Ola Lagunero held the Trios title for over 1,140 days. On March 6, 2000, Black Warrior lost the NWA World Light Heavyweight title to Tarzan Boy after a reign lasting 727 days. In subsequent months Black Warrior began to hear cheers, especially because of his high risk "Tope of death" move, a (high-speed dive out of the ring). In 2001 Black Warrior entered the Leyenda de Plata (the silver legend) tournament, still a rudo but hearing the cheers of the crowd more and more. In the semi-final Warrior faced Black Tiger III and the two did a "double turn" where Black Warrior became a fan favourite (called a técnico in Mexico) while Black Tiger III became a rudo. Warrior won the tournament when he defeated previous year's winner Negro Casas to claim the 2001 "Leyenda de Plata" trophy. In February 2002, Ola Lagunero vacated the trios title when Panther and Wagner kicked Black Warrior out of the group. On March 17, 2002, the new Ola Lagunero (Panther, Dr. Wagner Jr., and Fuerza Guerrera) defeated Warrior, Mr. Niebla, and Antifaz del Norte in a match for the vacant championship. Three months later Warrior, Mr. Niebla, and Atlantis won the CMLL trios title from the new Ola Lagunera. The trio lost the title March 2003 but Warrior regained it on July 9, 2004, with El Canek and Rayo de Jalisco, Jr., beginning a 133-day reign.

After losing the trios title Black Warrior had a hard time finding any direction, at one point he publicly pleaded with CMLL to turn him rudo via an interview for Box y Lucha magazine. In early 2006 Warrior began working with Místico and the two quickly earned a shot at the CMLL World Tag Team Championship, held by Averno and Mephisto. During the third fall of the match, Místico accidentally collided with Black Warrior causing their team to lose. Weeks later, during a rematch, Black Warrior turned on Místico, attacking him during the match and then walking out. The storyline with Místico was further intensified when Black Warrior defeated Místico for the NWA World Middleweight Championship on May 12, 2006. After months of scripted hostility between Warrior and Místico the two faced off in a Luchas de Apuestas (bet fight), mask versus mask match at CMLL's 73rd Anniversary show. The match saw Místico defeat Black Warrior, two falls to one, to win Black Warrior's mask. For the first time in his career Warrior was forced to unmask and show his face in public. Following the loss of his mask Black Warrior made several successful title defenses against Místico until finally losing the NWA World Middleweight Title back to him on April 29, 2007. After the feud with Místico ended Black Warrior worked as an upper-card rudo although not with any major storylines. In late 2007 Black Warrior became involved in a storyline that saw Warrior and Rey Bucanero team up to take on Shocker and Lizmark Jr. in a tag team Luchas de Apuestas with the hair of the losing team on the line. On December 7, 2007 Warrior and Bucanero lost and had their heads shaved completely bald as a result of the stipulation, in the main event of CMLL's pay-per-view Sin Piedad (Without Mercy).

=== Poder Mexica (2008–2009) ===
After a draw between Sangre Azteca and Dragón Rojo Jr. the two began teaming together regularly and soon added Black Warrior as the third man to form a trio called Poder Mexica. The group saw mixed success around Mexico but remained undefeated in Arena Mexico, CMLL's main venue, earning the group a shot at the Mexican National Trios Championship held by Sagrado, La Sombra, and Volador Jr. Poder Mexicana won the title in their first attempt, defeating the champions on February 3, 2009. Shortly after winning the Championship Black Warrior was suspended from working in Mexico City, forcing Poder Mexica to draft Misterioso, Jr. to take the place of Black Warrior when they worked in Mexico City, making him an unofficial a member of Poder Mexicana. In mid-April 2009 Warrior returned to Arena Mexico to reunite Poder Mexico.

On July 10, 2009, Black Warrior teamed with No Limit (Naito and Yujiro) to defeat the team of Héctor Garza, Toscano, and Sagrado, After the match Black Warrior made a challenge on behalf of Yujiro for a "hair vs. hair" match with Garza. This led to all men being involved in a 15-man steel cage Luchas de Apuestas match at Infierno en el Ring that Naito won by pinning Toscano. After not teaming with the other members of Poder Mexica during mid-2009, Black Warrior left the group. Black Warrior's feud with No Limit continued through the fall, leading to a Luchas de Apuesta, hair vs. hair match between Black Warrior and Yujiro on October 16, 2009, a match which Black Warrior lost and subsequently had his hair shaved off after the match.

=== Later career (2010–2023) ===
On June 20, 2012, Black Warrior turned rudo and formed the Los Depredadores del Aire ("The Flying Predators") stable with Mr. Águila and Volador Jr. Two days later, Los Depredadores del Aire defeated Los Reyes de la Atlantida (Atlantis, Delta, and Guerrero Maya Jr.) to win the Mexican National Trios Championship. They lost the title back to Los Reyes de la Atlantida on October 30, 2012.

On February 21, 2014, Black Warrior made a surprise return to AAA as the newest member of Los Perros del Mal. He then defeated Psicosis, Psycho Clown, and El Texano, Jr. to advance to the final of the 2014 Rey de Reyes tournament. On March 16 at Rey de Reyes, Black Warrior was defeated in the finals of the tournament by La Parka.

After leaving AAA, Black Warrior made his debut for Lucha Libre Elite on November 15, 2015.

In his last years, he won the Arena Mamá Lucha-S Cruiserweight Championship, which he successfully defended against Coyote Azteca in his last match held on January 1, 2023.

== Personal life and death ==
López was the nephew of wrestlers Blue Panther (real name Genaro Vásquez Nevares) and Héctor López. He was married to the daughter of Mano Negra (real name Jesús Reza Rosales), and had two sons who became wrestlers; Black Warrior Jr. and Hijo de Black Warrior. Warrior Jr. (real name Ramses de Jesús Toral) suffered a severe spinal injury whilst training for a CMLL debut in August 2021, and died March 17, 2022. His brother subsequently adopted the "Black Warrior Jr." name in homage to him.

López died on January 10, 2023, at the age of 54, three days following his birthday.

== Championships and accomplishments ==
- Arena Mamá Lucha-S
  - Arena Mama Lucha-S Cruiserweight Championship (1 time)
- Consejo Mundial de Lucha Libre
  - CMLL World Trios Championship (3 times) – with Blue Panther and Dr. Wagner Jr. (1), Atlantis and Mr. Niebla (1), Rayo de Jalisco Jr. and El Canek (1)
  - Mexican National Trios Championship (2 times) – with Dragón Rojo, Jr. and Sangre Azteca (1), and Mr. Águila and Volador Jr. (1)
  - NWA World Light Heavyweight Championship (2 times)
  - NWA World Middleweight Championship (1 time)
  - Leyenda de Plata: 2001
  - Copa de Arena Mexico: 2001 – with Shocker, and Apolo Dantés, 2002 with Lizmark, Jr., and Rayo de Jalisco, Jr.
- International Wrestling Revolution Group
  - IWRG Intercontinental Tag Team Championship (1 time) – with Warrior Jr.
- Other titles
  - Distrito Federal Trios Championship (1 time) – with Oro and Plata

== Luchas de Apuestas record ==
Winner (wager)	Loser (wager)	Location	Event	Date	Notes
Black Warrior (mask)	Impala (hair)	N/A	Live event	N/A	
Black Warrior (mask)	Bronco (mask)	Mexico City	Live event	July 19, 1996	
Black Warrior (mask)	Super Elektra (mask)	Los Angeles, California	Live event	1997	
Black Warrior (mask)	Brazo de Platino (mask)	San Luis Potosí, San Luis Potosí	Live event	September 30, 2000	
Místico (mask)	Black Warrior (mask)	Mexico City	CMLL 73rd Anniversary Show	September 29, 2006	
Lizmark Jr. and Shocker (hair)	Rey Bucanero and Black Warrior (hair)	Mexico City	Sin Piedad	December 12, 2007	
Yujiro (hair)	Black Warrior (hair)	Mexico City	Live event	October 16, 2009	
Rey Escorpión (hair)	Black Warrior (hair)	Mexico City	Live event	June 1, 2012	
Carístico (mask)	Black Warrior (hair)	Naucalpan, State of Mexico	Prisión Fatal	July 23, 2017	(Note: They were the last two wrestlers in a steel cage match that also included Trauma II and Mr. Electro)
