= Leyenda de Plata (2011) =

Mexican professional wrestling tournament

- Official poster for the finals, depicting Volador Jr. (left) and Jushin Thunder Liger (right)
- Promotion: Consejo Mundial de Lucha Libre
- Date: September 23, 2011; September 30, 2011; October 7, 2011
- City: Mexico City, Mexico
- Venue: Arena México

Event chronology
← Previous; Universal Championship	Next → CMLL 78th Anniversary Show

Leyenda de Plata chronology
← Previous; 2008	Next → 2014

The Leyenda de Plata (2011) was professional wrestling tournament produced by the Mexican wrestling promotion Consejo Mundial de Lucha Libre (CMLLl; Spanish "World Wrestling Council") that ran from September 23, 2011, over the course of three of CMLL's Friday night shows in Arena México with the finals on October 7, 2011. The annual Leyenda de Plata tournament is held in honor of lucha libre legend El Santo and is one of CMLL's most important annual tournaments.

After a two-year hiatus, the eleventh Leyenda de Plata returned in 2011. With the winner of the three previous Leyenda de Plata's, Místico, having signed a contract with WWE in January 2011, CMLL eliminated the final stage of the tournament, meaning that the winners of the torneo cibernetico elimination match qualified straight for the finals. The first cibernetico took place on September 23 and was won by Volador Jr., who outlasted Delta, Guerrero Maya Jr., La Máscara, Metal Blanco, Palacio Negro, Pólvora, Puma King, Shigeo Okumura, Stuka Jr., Tiger and Valiente. The second cibernetico took place on September 30 at CMLL's 78th Anniversary Show and was won by Jushin Thunder Liger, who outlasted Diamante, Dragón Rojo Jr., Fuego, Hijo del Signo, Olímpico, Máscara Dorada, Mephisto, Metro, Rey Escorpión, Sangre Azteca and Virus. On October 7, Volador Jr. defeated Jushin Thunder Liger to win the 2011 Leyenda de Plata.

== Production ==
=== Background ===
The Leyenda de Plata (Spanish for "the Silver Legend") is an annual lucha libre tournament scripted and promoted by the Mexican professional wrestling promotion Consejo Mundial de Lucha Libre (CMLL). The first Leyenda de Plata was held in 1998 and was in honor of El Santo, nicknamed Enmáscarado de Plata (the Silver mask) from which the tournament got its name. The trophy given to the winner is a plaque with a metal replica of the mask that El Santo wore in both wrestling and lucha films.

The Leyenda de Plata was held annually until 2003, at which point El Santo's son, El Hijo del Santo left CMLL on bad terms. The tournament returned in 2004 and has been held on an almost annual basis since then. The original format of the tournament was the Torneo cibernetico elimination match to qualify for a semi-final. The winner of the semi-final would face the winner of the previous year's tournament in the final. Since 2005 CMLL has held two cibernetico matches and the winner of each then meet in the semi-final. In 2011, the tournament was modified to eliminate the final stage as the previous winner, Místico, did not work for CMLL at that point in time The 2011 edition of La Leyenda de Plata was the 11th overall tournament held by CMLL.

=== Storylines ===
The events featured a total of number of professional wrestling matches with different wrestlers involved in pre-existing scripted feuds, plots and storylines. Wrestlers were portrayed as either heels (referred to as rudos in Mexico, those that portray the "bad guys") or faces (técnicos in Mexico, the "good guy" characters) as they followed a series of tension-building events, which culminated in a wrestling match or series of matches.

== Tournament overview ==
=== Cibernetico 1 ===
#	Eliminated	Eliminated by
1	Tiger	Stuka Jr.
2	Shigeo Okumura	Guerrero Maya Jr.
3	Puma King	Palacio Negro
4	Palacio Negro	Metal Blanco
5	Delta	Stuka Jr.
6	Stuka Jr.	Delta
7	Metal Blanco	Pólvora
8	Guerrero Maya Jr.	Valiente
9	Pólvora	Volador Jr.
10	Valiente	La Máscara
11	La Máscara	Volador Jr.
12	Winner	Volador Jr.

=== Cibernetico 2 ===
#	Eliminated	Eliminated by
1	El Hijo del Signo	Fuego
2	Diamante	Rey Escorpión
3	Fuego	Sangre Azteca
4	Rey Escorpión	Olímpico
5	Virus	Metro
6	Sangre Azteca	Máscara Dorada
7	Olímpico	Dragón Rojo Jr.
8	Metro	Mephisto
9	Máscara Dorada	Jushin Thunder Liger
10	Dragón Rojo Jr.	Mephisto
11	Mephisto	Jushin Thunder Liger
12	Winner	Jushin Thunder Liger

== Results ==
=== September 23, 2011 ===
No.	Results	Stipulations
1	Lady Apache and Marcela defeated Princesa Blanca and Princesa Sugehit	Best two-out-of-three falls tag team match
2	Volador Jr. defeated La Máscara, Valiente, Stuka Jr., Delta, Guerrero Maya Jr., Metal Blanco, Palacio Negro, Pólvora, Okumura, Puma King, and Tiger	2011 Leyenda de Plata qualifier, 16-man torneo cibernetico elimination match
3	Jushin Liger, La Sombra, and Máscara Dorada defeated Averno, Dragón Rojo Jr., and Mephisto	Best two-out-of-three falls six-man tag team match
4	El Felino, Mr. Niebla, and Negro Casas defeated Rey Bucanero, El Terrible, and Texano Jr.	Best two-out-of-three falls six-man tag team match
5	Atlantis defeated Último Guerrero	Best two-out-of-three falls match

=== September 30, 2011 ===
No.	Results	Stipulations
1	Ángel Azteca Jr. and Hombre Bala Jr. defeated Los Rayos Tapatío (Rayo Tapatío I and Rayo Tapatío II)	Best two-out-of-three falls tag team match
2	Euforia and Misterioso Jr. defeated Dragon Lee and Stuka Jr.	Best two-out-of-three falls tag team match
3	Jushin Liger defeated Diamante, Dragón Rojo Jr., Fuego, Hijo del Signo, Olímpico, Máscara Dorada, Mephisto, Metro, Rey Escorpión, Sangre Azteca and Virus	2011 Leyenda de Plata qualifier, 16-man torneo cibernetico elimination match
4	El Felino defeated Rey Bucanero; Also in the match: Rush, Mr. Águila, El Terrible vs. Texano Jr., Héctor Garza, Máximo, Blue Panther, Negro Casas	10-man steel cage elimination match Lucha de Apuestas, "hair vs. hair" match.

=== October 7, 2011 ===
No.	Results	Stipulations
1	Hombre Bala Jr., Starman, and Súper Halcón, Jr. defeated Bobby Zavala, El Cholo, and Disturbio	Best two-out-of-three falls six-man tag team match
2	La Amapola, Mima Shimoda, and Princesa Sugehit defeated Lady Apache, Marcela, and Ray	Best two-out-of-three falls six-man tag team match
3	Mephisto, Rey Bucanero, and El Terrible defeated Héctor Garza, Máscara Dorada, and Toscano by disqualification	Best two-out-of-three falls six-man tag team match
4	Atlantis, Blue Panther, and Shocker defeated El Felino, Mr. Niebla, and Negro Casas	Best two-out-of-three falls six-man tag team match
5	Volador Jr. defeated Jushin Liger	2011 Leyenda de Plata finals
