= Sin Piedad (2011) =

Mexican professional wrestling supercard show

- Poster for the 2011 Sin Piedad event
- Promotion: Consejo Mundial de Lucha Libre
- Date: December 16, 2011
- City: Mexico City, Mexico
- Venue: Arena México
- Attendance: 6,000 – 7,000

Pay-per-view chronology
← Previous; CMLL 78th Anniversary Show	Next → Fantastica Mania

Sin Piedad chronology
← Previous; 2010	Next → 2012

Sin Piedad (2011) (Spanish for "No Mercy") was an annual professional wrestling major event produced by Consejo Mundial de Lucha Libre (CMLL), which took place on December 16, 2011, in Arena México, Mexico City, Mexico and replaced CMLL's regular Friday night show Super Viernes ("Super Friday"). The 2011 Sin Piedad was the tenth event under that name that CMLL promoted as their last major show of the year, always held in December. The main event of the show centered around a long running storyline between Blue Panther and the Casas wrestling family, represented by El Felino in this instance. The two wrestled in a Lucha de Apuesta, hair vs. hair match where the loser of the match would be forced to have all his hair shaved off. The show featured four two out of three falls six-man tag team match and one tag team match with representatives from CMLL's Mini-Estrella division.

== Production ==
=== Background ===
The Mexican wrestling company Consejo Mundial de Lucha Libre (Spanish for "World Wrestling Council"; CMLL) has held a number of major shows over the years using the moniker Sin Piedad ("No Pity" or "No Mercy"). CMLL has intermittently held a show billed specifically as Sin Piedad since 2000, primarily using the name for their "end of the year" show in December, although once they held a Sin Piedad show in August as well. CMLL has on occasion used a different name for the end-of-year show but Sin Piedad is the most commonly used name. All Sin Piedad shows have been held in Arena México in Mexico City, Mexico which is CMLL's main venue, its "home". Traditionally CMLL holds their major events on Friday Nights, which means the Sin Piedad shows replace their regularly scheduled Super Viernes show. The 2011 Sin Piedad show was the tenth show to use the name.

=== Storylines ===
The event featured six professional wrestling matches with different wrestlers involved in pre-existing scripted feuds, plots and storylines. Wrestlers were portrayed as either heels (referred to as rudos in Mexico, those that portray the "bad guys") or faces (técnicos in Mexico, the "good guy" characters) as they followed a series of tension-building events, which culminated in a wrestling match or series of matches.

The storyline culminating in the main event match was not just between Blue Panther and El Felino but the entire Casas wrestling family that stretched back to the middle of the year as they built towards the Lucha de Apuesta hair vs. hair match between the two. In Lucha Libre the Luchas de Apuestas match is the ultimate payoff to a storyline and more often than not results in the conclusion of the storyline between the two. Panther and both Negro Casas and El Felino had all been part of a Luchas de Apuestas, multi-man cage match at the CMLL 78th Anniversary Show in September, but all three had escaped the cage without losing their hair, instead El Felino defeated Rey Bucanero. The build to Sin Piedad originally focused on Panther and Negro Casas or at times hinting at Panther teaming up with Shocker to face Negro Casas and El Felino in a Tag Team match with everyone wagering their hair on the outcome. The storyline played out in a way that it looked like the match was set between Negro Casas and Blue Panther, but on the night of the contract signing El Felino signed the contract instead and took his older brother's place in the match. A week prior to the match taking place, Panther was disqualified in a tag team match, after giving El Felino a Martinete (a piledriver), which is considered an illegal move in Lucha Libre and deemed "outlawed". The incident led to the Distrito Federal Box y Lucha Commission announcing that Panther was suspended for two weeks, but that the suspension would not start until after the Sin Piedad event.

The semi-main event saw the CMLL return of Marco Corleone who had worked for CMLL a few years previously, but had competed for some time for CMLL's Mexican rival Lucha Libre AAA World Wide (AAA) as well as the American based Lucha Libre USA Professional wrestling promotions. When the match was announced for Sin Piedad it was assumed that Corleone was randomly paired up with Rush and Maximo, two wrestlers who had never teamed with Corleone nor each other on a regular basis. The trio would face an experienced team in La Peste Negra (Negro Casas and Mr. Niebla) who would team up with Rey Bucanero, former member of La Peste Negra. The fact that Casas' brother El Felino had forced Rey Bucanero to be shaved bald after September's 78th Anniversary Show built the notion that perhaps the Rudo team was not going to co-exist without problems.

The fourth match of the night was the continuation of Atlantis Tecnico turn that had started earlier in the year. Atlantis had taken over as the mentor of a group of young wrestlers in the Forjando un Ídolo when Shocker was injured. Atlantis would team regularly with Guerrero Maya Jr. and Delta, the top two wrestlers in his group and formed a team called Los Reyes de la Atlantida ("The Kings of the Atlantis"). The trio was awarded a match for the Mexican National Trios Championship, the second highest Trios championship in CMLL after the CMLL World Trios Championship. The then reigning Mexican National Trios Champions were Los Invasores, represented by Volador Jr., Psicosis and Olímpico who had held the title since September 20, 2011. The last three matches on the card did not build on any specific pre-existing story lines.

== Event ==
The opening match was a tag team match featuring CMLL's Mini-Estrella division as Demus 3:16 and the Mexican National Lightweight Champion Pierrothito faced off against the Tecnico team of Electrico and Último Dragóncito. Último Dragóncito won the first fall when he pinned Demus in just a few moments. The Rudo team surged back in the second round as Demus 3:16 pinned Electrico after executing an Asai Moonsault. The Rudo team secured the third and final fall over Electrico.

The second match of the night was a Best two-out-of-three falls Six-man tag team match with the Tecnica team of Dalys la Caribeña, Lady Apache and Marcela faced off against Princesa Sujei and Princesa Blanca, who often wrestle under the team name "Las Ladies de Polanco" and their partner Tiffany. The females split the first two falls with Dalys, Apache and Marcela winning the first fall and Los Ladies and Tiffany winning the second fall. In the third fall Princesa Blanca accidentally kicked the referee, which led to her team being disqualified in the third fall and thus losing the match. Brazo de Plata replaced Máscara Dorada who had to miss the event due to an injury. Brazo de Plata teamed up with Ángel de Oro and Valiente as they lost to Los Hijos del Averno (Ephesto and Mephisto) and Rey Escorpión, two falls to one.

CMLL held an in-ring contract signing after the third match concluded, to publicly confirm that Los Rayos Tapatio would face the team of Hombre Bala Jr. and Super Halcón Jr. on January 1, 2012, in a tag team Luchas de Apuestas where both team members put their masks on the line. The fourth match of the evening was one of the most anticipated matches on the card as the newly formed trio of Atlantis, Delta and Guerrero Maya Jr. received a championship opportunity against Los Invasores ("The Invaders") as Volador Jr., Psicosis and Olímpico defended the Mexican National Trios Championship, the second title defense for the team since becoming champions on September 20, 2011. During the first fall referee El Tirantes, who portrays a referee that supports the rudo team, refused to count a pinfall on Los Invasores despite all three men being pinned by Los Reyes. When Delta complains to El Tirantes, Volador Jr. snug up on him from behind, applied his signature Ataque Depredador move, a Double knee backbreaker and got the pinfall.

Following the unfair actions of the referee Rambo, acting as a representative of the Mexico City Boxing and Wrestling Committee declared that El Tirantes was relieved of his duties and an unbiased referee took over the officiating duties for the match. Taking advantage of the confusion Atlantis throws Volador Jr. out of the ring and then leaps over the top rope onto his opponent. Meanwhile, Delta executed a Moonsault from the top rope onto the prone Psicosis while Guerrero Maya Jr. used his signature move Sacrifica Maya ("Mayan Sacrifice", an over the shoulder back-to-belly piledriver). A replacement referee ran to the ring as Delta and Guerrero Maya Jr. pinned their opponents and counted to three to give the challengers the second fall. The third fall of the match came down to the two "Captains" (Atlantis and Volador Jr.) with everyone else being eliminated. Atlantis managed to gain the upper hand after a high flying move from Volador Jr. misses the mark, allowing him to get the pin to make Los Reyes de la Atlantida the new Mexican National Trios Champions.

Moments before the fifth match of the night CMLL held a short ceremony to honor the memory of Blue Demon, one of the most famous luchadors ever, commemorating that Friday December 16 was the 11th anniversary of Blue Demon's death. The fifth match of the evening featured the CMLL return of Marco Corleone, who had last worked for the company in early 2009. He left the company to work for their main rival in Mexico Lucha Libre AAA World Wide (AAA). Corleone returned to team up with fellow tecnicos Maximo and Rush against the team of Negro Casas, Mr. Niebla and Rey Bucanero. The match only goes two falls as the tecnicos quickly win the first fall and then Corleone ensures that his return would be memorable by running down the ramp towards the ring, leaping clean over the top rope and taking Mr. Niebla to the mat with Corleone's signature Air Italianam a Diving crossbody that gave his team a two to nothing victory.

El Felino was accompanied by his brother, Negro Casas, for the main event match while Blue Panther had Rey Bucanero in his corner to even the odds for the night. Felino would quickly win the first fall of the night, putting Blue Panther on the defensive as he did everything in his power to even the match between them. With the second fall coming in quick succession the two worked a much longer third fall, alternating between who had control of the match. The final fall of the match came to a confusing end with a finish that upset a lot of the fans in the arena. At one point Blue Panther had El Felino in position for a Martinete, but was warned by a representative of the Mexico City boxing and wrestling commission that Panther would be disqualified if he even tried to do use this move again in the match. Later in the content Rey Bucanero made an appearance and tried to distract the referee so El Felino could try to apply a Martinete on Blue Panther instead, only to be interrupted by Negro Casas who jumped in the ring to stop his brother from losing the match that way. At this point the referee called for the disqualification, giving the match to Blue Panther. After the match El Felino sat in the middle of the ring as all his hair was shaved off to close the show. This event marked the first time El Felino had lost his hair in a Luchas de Apuestas match.

== Aftermath ==
Following the tainted victory in the main event Negro Casas stepped in and targeted Blue Panther, with the storyline explanation being that he wanted revenge for the "humiliation" of his brother at the hands of Blue Panther. Casas and Panther faced off extensively in the months prior to Homenaje a Dos Leyendas, most often on opposite sides of six-man tag team matches, the most common match form in CMLL. When the two finally wrestled in a one-on-one match the two went to a time limit draw with no clear winner of the match, giving neither man a clear advantage going into the Luchas de Apuestas match. As part of the build up to the event Panther and Casas engaged in a fight during the press conference for the contract signing, an event common in wrestling shows from the United States, but rare in Mexico. Blue Panther was rumored to have been injured during the press conference altercation, putting the main event in question, but ultimately the match took place as scheduled. Blue Panther and Negro Casas wrestled to a draw, which meant that both men were forced to have their hair off. Despite comments from both Casas and Blue Panther that their draw was not the end of their rivalry no significant developments took place between the two in the months following Dos Leyendas.

The trio of Corleone, Rush and Maximo would later be named El Bufete del Amor ("The Law of Love"), a trio that would go on to defeat Los Hijos del Averno (Averno, Ephesto and Mephisto) on February 15, 2012 to win the CMLL World Trios Championship. Los Guerreros de la Atlantida held the Mexican National Trios Championship until June 22, 2010, when they lost the title to Los Depredadores del Aire (Black Warrior, Mr. Águila and Volador Jr.).

On January 1, 2012, the rookies Hombre Bala Jr. and Super Halcón Jr. would defeat the veteran team of Los Rayos Tapatio, who then had to unmask as per the Luchas de Apuestas stipulation the two teams agreed on during the Sin Piedad event.

== Reception ==
The main event, especially the finish received a lot of criticism from various sources, the Lucha Blog explained that the problem was that "CMLL did give the fans a head shaving. They did not even slightly give them one guy proving they were better than the other". In one instance the main event match was described as "being a film seen countless times". The first three matches were described as being "below expectations" and that they had a hard time connecting with the fans in attendance, but on the other hand the fourth, fifth and sixth match got the crowd on their feet and the tribute was described as "emotional".

== Results ==
No.	Results	Stipulations
1	Demus 3:16 and Pierrothito defeated Electrico and Último Dragóncito	Best two-out-of-three falls Tag Team match
2	Dalys la Caribeña, Lady Apache and Marcela defeated Princesa Sujei, Princesa Blanca and Tiffany by disqualification	Best two-out-of-three falls six-woman "Lucha Libre rules" tag team match
3	Los Hijos del Averno (Ephesto and Mephisto) and Rey Escorpión defeated Ángel de Oro, Brazo de Plata and Valiente	Best two-out-of-three falls six-man "Lucha Libre rules" tag team match
4	Los Reyes de la Atlantida (Atlantis, Delta and Guerrero Maya Jr.) defeated Los Invasores (Volador Jr., Psicosis and Olímpico) (c)	Best two-out-of-three falls six-man "Lucha Libre rules" tag team match for the Mexican National Trios Championship
5	Marco Corleone, Maximo and Rush defeated La Peste Negra (Negro Casas and Mr. Niebla) and Rey Bucanero	Best two-out-of-three falls six-man "Lucha Libre rules" tag team match
6	Blue Panther defeated El Felino by disqualification	Best two-out-of-three falls Lucha de Apuestas, hair vs. hair match
(c) / – the champion(s) heading into the match
