= CMLL 78th Anniversary Show =

Mexican Professional wrestling show

CMLL 78h Anniversary show
- The official poster for the 78th Anniversary show
- Promotion: Consejo Mundial de Lucha Libre (CMLL)
- Date: September 30, 2011
- City: Mexico City, Mexico
- Venue: Arena México
- Attendance: 8,400

Event chronology
← Previous; Leyenda de Plata	Next → Sin Piedad

CMLL Anniversary Shows chronology
← Previous; 77th Anniversary	Next → 79th Anniversary

The CMLL 78th Anniversary Show (Spanish: 78. Aniversario de CMLL) was a professional wrestling major show scripted and produced by Consejo Mundial de Lucha Libre (CMLL) that took place on September 30, 2011, in CMLL's home arena Arena México in Mexico City, Mexico. The event commemorated the 78th anniversary of CMLL, the oldest professional wrestling promotion in the world. CMLL's anniversary show is their biggest, most important show of the year, comparable to the Super Bowl for the National Football League or WrestleMania for WWE. The CMLL Anniversary Show series is the longest-running annual professional wrestling show, starting in 1934.

The main event of the show was a steel cage where all ten competitors put their hair on the line, with the stipulation that the last man in the cage would be shaved bald as a result. The match came down to El Felino and Rey Bucanero after Rush, Mr. Águila, El Terrible vs. El Texano Jr., Héctor Garza, Máximo, Blue Panther and Negro Casas had left the cage. El Felino pinned Rey Bucanero, forcing Rey Bucanero to stand in the middle of the ring as his hair was shaved off. The show featured three additional matches, including the first round of 2011 Leyenda de Plata tournament.

== Production ==
=== Background ===
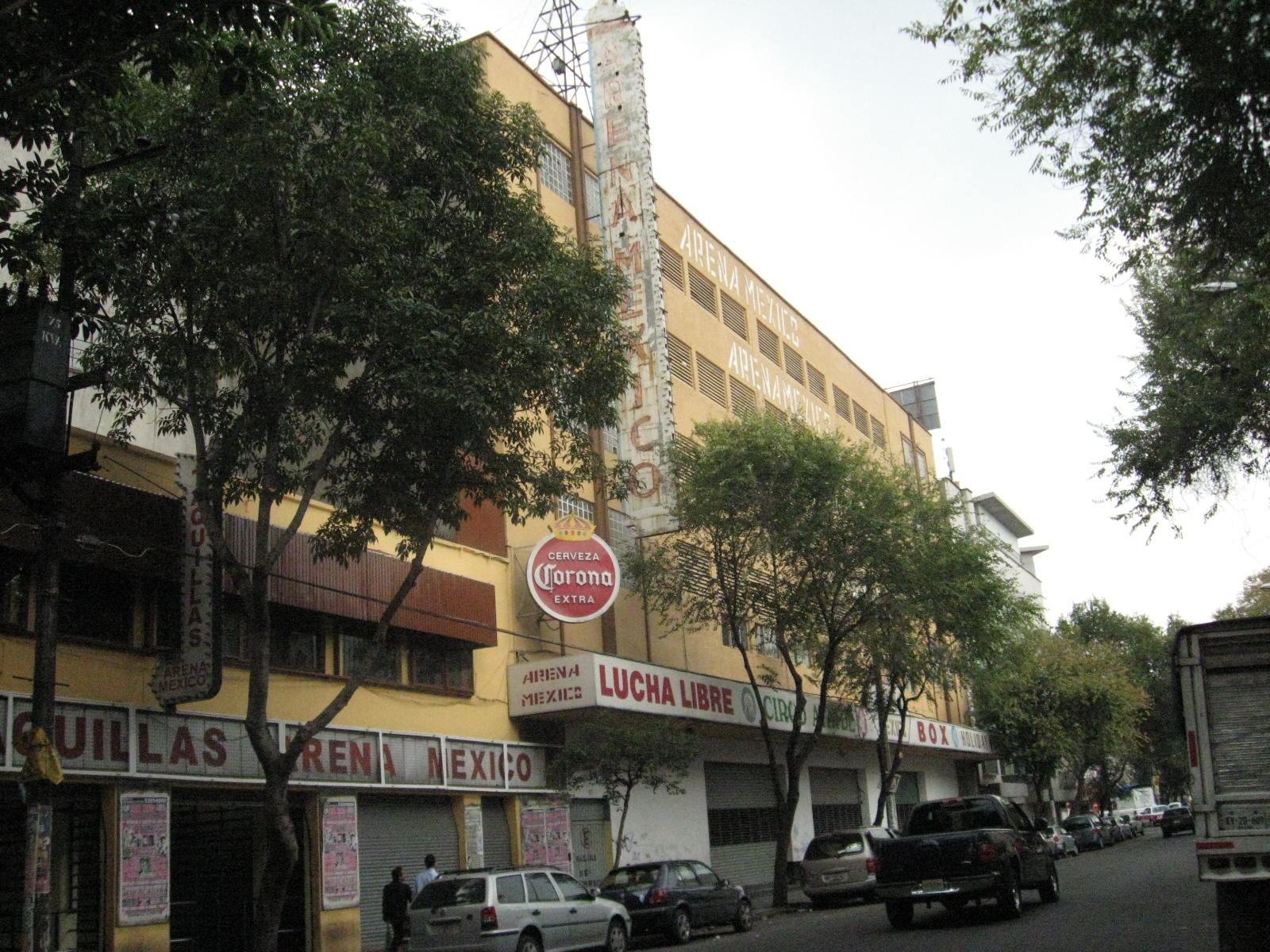
Arena México, CMLL's main venue and location of the Anniversary Show

The Mexican Lucha libre (professional wrestling) company Consejo Mundial de Lucha Libre (CMLL) started out under the name Empresa Mexicana de Lucha Libre ("Mexican Wrestling Company"; EMLL), founded by Salvador Lutteroth in 1933. Lutteroth, inspired by professional wrestling shows he had attended in Texas, decided to become a wrestling promoter and held his first show on September 21, 1933, marking what would be the beginning of organized professional wrestling in Mexico. Lutteroth would later become known as "the father of Lucha Libre" . A year later EMLL held the EMLL 1st Anniversary Show, starting the annual tradition of the Consejo Mundial de Lucha Libre Anniversary Shows that have been held each year ever since, most commonly in September.

Over the years the anniversary show would become the biggest show of the year for CMLL, akin to the Super Bowl for the National Football League (NFL) or WWE's WrestleMania event. The first anniversary show was held in Arena Modelo, which Lutteroth had bought after starting EMLL. In 1942–43 Lutteroth financed the construction of Arena Coliseo, which opened in April 1943. The EMLL 10th Anniversary Show was the first of the anniversary shows to be held in Arena Coliseo. In 1956 Lutteroth had Arena México built in the location of the original Arena Modelo, making Arena México the main venue of EMLL from that point on. Starting with the EMLL 23rd Anniversary Show, all anniversary shows except for the EMLL 46th Anniversary Show have been held in the arena that would become known as "The Cathedral of Lucha Libre". On occasion EMLL held more than one show labelled as their "Anniversary" show, such as two 33rd Anniversary Shows in 1966. Over time the anniversary show series became the oldest, longest-running annual professional wrestling show. In comparison, WWE's WrestleMania is only the fourth oldest still promoted show (CMLL's Arena Coliseo Anniversary Show and Arena México anniversary shows being second and third). EMLL was supposed to hold the EMLL 52nd Anniversary Show on September 20, 1985 but Mexico City was hit by a magnitude 8.0 earthquake. EMLL canceled the event both because of the general devastation but also over fears that Arena México might not be structurally sound after the earthquake.

When Jim Crockett Promotions was bought by Ted Turner in 1988 EMLL became the oldest still active promotion in the world. In 1991 EMLL was rebranded as "Consejo Mundial de Lucha Libre" and thus held the CMLL 59th Anniversary Show, the first under the new name, on September 18, 1992. Traditionally CMLL holds their major events on Friday Nights, replacing their regularly scheduled Super Viernes show.

The 78th Anniversary Show was the fourth time CMLL held a steel cage match as the main event of their Anniversary Shows, previously holding them on their 68th, 74th and 77th Anniversary Shows.

=== Storylines ===
The event featured four professional wrestling matches with different wrestlers involved in pre-existing scripted feuds, plots and storylines. Wrestlers were portrayed as either heels (referred to as rudos in Mexico, those that portray the "bad guys") or faces (técnicos in Mexico, the "good guy" characters) as they followed a series of tension-building events, which culminated in a wrestling match or series of matches.

== Event ==
For the Leyenda de Plata (Spanish for "The Silver Legend") tournament the 12 men were split into two teams for a torneo cibernetico elimination match. One side consisted of Mephisto, Máscara Dorada, Diamante, Virus, Fuego and Olímpico facing off against the team of Jushin Liger, Hijo del Signo, Dragón Rojo Jr., Metro, Rey Escorpión and Sangre Azteca. The first wrestler was eliminated about seven minutes into the match when Fuego pinned Hijo del Signo. He was soon followed by Diamante, Fuego and Rey Escorpión who were all eliminated in quick succession. For the next elimination Metro had help from Sangre Azteca to pin Virus, giving their team the numbers advantage. Moments later Máscara Dorada pinned Sangre Azteca, evening the sides. Next followed the eliminations of Olímpico, Metro and Máscara Dorada. Facing off against both Dragón Rojo Jr. and Jushin Liger, Mephisto cheated to eliminate Dragón Rojo Jr. but could not overcome the veteran Jushin Linger who pinned Mephisto after he performed a Brainbuster on Mephisto, winning the match.

For the main event steel cage match CMLL imposed a five minute period where no one would be allowed to climb out of the cage, forcing them to fight it out. During the ten minute grace period Mr. Águila leaped off the top of the 20 foot tall cage, diving onto several of the wrestlers in the ring. Once the referee signaled that the time limit was up Rush was the first wrestler to climb up the side of the cage and straddle the top, officially escaping the cage the moment his leg was over the side. Next out were Mr. Águila and then El Terrible and El Texano Jr., tag team partners who helped each other escape the cage. Héctor Garza was the fifth man out of the cage, followed moments later by Máximo. then Blue Panther and finally Negro Casas climbed over the top. This left El Felino and Rey Bucanero as the last two wrestlers in the match. At this point the rules changed so that it was no longer escaping the cage that mattered, but defeating their opponent by pinfall or submission. Near the end of the match Bucanero tried to perform a top rope Huracarrana move, but El Felino managed to reverse it, performing a super power bomb slam on Rey Bucanero instead. Moments later El Felino pinned Rey Bucanero while illegally putting his feet on the bottom rope to increase his leverage. Afterwards Rey Bucanero stood in the middle of the ring. allowing the official CMLL barber to shave all of Rey Bucanero's hair off as the cage was disassembled.

== Aftermath ==
After the main event Rey Bucanero stated that he felt like he was the moral winner of the main event since El Felino had to cheat to defeat him, vowing that it was not over between the two. For his part El Felino stated that after pinning Rey Bucanero he should now get a match for the NWA World Historic Light Heavyweight Championship that Bucanero held at the time. Despite pinning Bucanero, El Felino was never given a match for the NWA World Historic Light Heavyweight Championship.

After winning the torneo cibernetico portion of the 2011 Leyenda de Plata tournament Jushin Liger faced Volador Jr., who had also won a torneo cibernetico, on the following week's Super Viernes. In the end Volador Jr. pinned Jushin Liger to win their match two falls to one and claim the Leyenda de Plata tournament.

The undercard feud between Los Rayos Tapatío and Hombre Bala Jr. and Super Halcón Jr. continued throughout the fall and winter, ending with Los Rayos Tapatío losing a Lucha de Apuestas on January 1, 2012 after which they were forced to unmask.

== Results ==
No.	Results	Stipulations
1	Ángel Azteca Jr. and Hombre Bala Jr. defeated Los Rayos Tapatío (Rayo Tapatío I and Rayo Tapatío II)	Best two-out-of-three falls tag team match
2	Euforia and Misterioso Jr. defeated Dragon Lee and Stuka Jr.	Best two-out-of-three falls tag team match
3	Jushin Liger defeated Diamante, Dragón Rojo Jr., Fuego, Hijo del Signo, Olímpico, Máscara Dorada, Mephisto, Metro, Rey Escorpión, Sangre Azteca and Virus	Leyenda de Plata torneo cibernetico elimination match
4	El Felino defeated Rey Bucanero; Also in the match: Rush, Mr. Águila, El Terrible vs. El Texano Jr., Héctor Garza, Máximo, Blue Panther, Negro Casas	10-man steel cage elimination match Lucha de Apuestas, "hair vs. hair" match.

Cage match order of escape

#	Name
1	Rush
2	Mr. Águila
3	El Terrible
4	El Texano Jr.
5	Héctor Garza
6	Máximo
7	Blue Panther
8	Negro Casas
