= UWA World Featherweight Championship =

Professional wrestling championship

UWA World Featherweight Championship (Campeonato Mundial peso Pluma de UWA)

Details
- Promotion: Universal Wrestling Association (UWA)
- Date established: April 30, 1983
- Date retired: 1995
Statistics
- First champion(s): Pequeño Solin
- Final champion(s): Coralillo
- Longest reign: Flama Dorada II (560 days)
- Shortest reign: Super Archie (195 days)

The UWA World Featherweight Championship (Campeonato Mundial peso Pluma de UWA in Spanish) was a professional wrestling championship promoted by the Mexican wrestling promotion Universal Wrestling Association (UWA) from 1983 until the promotion closed in 1995. The official definition of the Featherweight weight class in Mexico is between 57 kg (126 lb) and 63 kg (139 lb), but is not always strictly enforced. (Note: The most recent case of this is Mephisto, holding the CMLL World Welterweight Championship, a belt with a 78 kg (172 lb) upper limit despite weighing 90 kg (200 lb).) the UWA World Featherweight Championship was not among the UWA titles that were kept active even after the UWA closed, like the UWA World Heavyweight Championship, but was abandoned when the UWA closed down.

As it was a professional wrestling championship, the championship was not won not by actual competition, but by a scripted ending to a match determined by the bookers and match makers. (Note: Hornbaker (2016) p. 550: "Professional wrestling is a sport in which match finishes are predetermined. Thus, win–loss records are not indicative of a wrestler's genuine success based on their legitimate abilities – but on now much, or how little they were pushed by promoters") On occasion the promotion declares a championship vacant, which means there is no champion at that point in time. This can either be due to a storyline, (Note: Duncan & Will (2000) p. 271, Chapter: Texas: NWA American Tag Team Title [World Class, Adkisson] "Championship held up and rematch ordered because of the interference of manager Gary Hart") or real life issues such as a champion suffering an injury being unable to defend the championship, (Note: Duncan & Will (2000) p. 20, Chapter: (United States: 19th Century & widely defended titles – NWA, WWF, AWA, IW, ECW, NWA) NWA/WCW TV Title "Rhodes stripped on 85/10/19 for not defending the belt after having his leg broken by Ric Flair and Ole & Arn Anderson") or leaving the company. (Note: Duncan & Will (2000) p. 201, Chapter: (Memphis, Nashville) Memphis: USWA Tag Team Title "Vacant on 93/01/18 when Spike leaves the USWA.")

== Title history ==
Key
No.	Overall reign number
Reign	Reign number for the specific champion
Days	Number of days held

No.	Champion	Championship change			Reign statistics		Notes	Ref.
No.	Champion	Date	Event	Location	Reign	Days	Notes	Ref.
1	Pequeño Solin	April 30, 1983	UWA Live event	Apatlaco, Morelos	1	Unknown	Defeated Lasser to become first champion.	(Note: Duncan & Will (2000) pp. 398–399, Chapter: MEXICO: UWA World Featherweight Title [Flores, Mora])
—	Vacated	1984	—	—	—	—	Championship vacated when Pequeño Solin failed to make the weight limit.	
2	Romano Garcia	October 17, 1987	UWA Live event	Apatlaco, Morelos	1	301	Defeated Lasser in tournament final to win the vacant title.	
3	Flama Dorada II	August 13, 1988	UWA Live event	Apatlaco, Morelos	1	560		
4	Rodolfo Ruiz	February 24, 1990	UWA Live event	Xochimilco, Mexico	1	323		
5	Super Archie	January 13, 1991	UWA Live event	Mexico City	1	195		
6	Bird Boy	July 27, 1991	UWA Live event	Apatlaco, Morelos	1	420		
7	Coralillo	September 19, 1992	UWA Live event	San Lorenzo, Oaxaca, Mexico	1	Unknown		
—	Deactivated	November 1995	—	—	—	—	Championship abandoned as the UWA Closes in November 1995	
