= Puma King =

Mexican professional wrestler

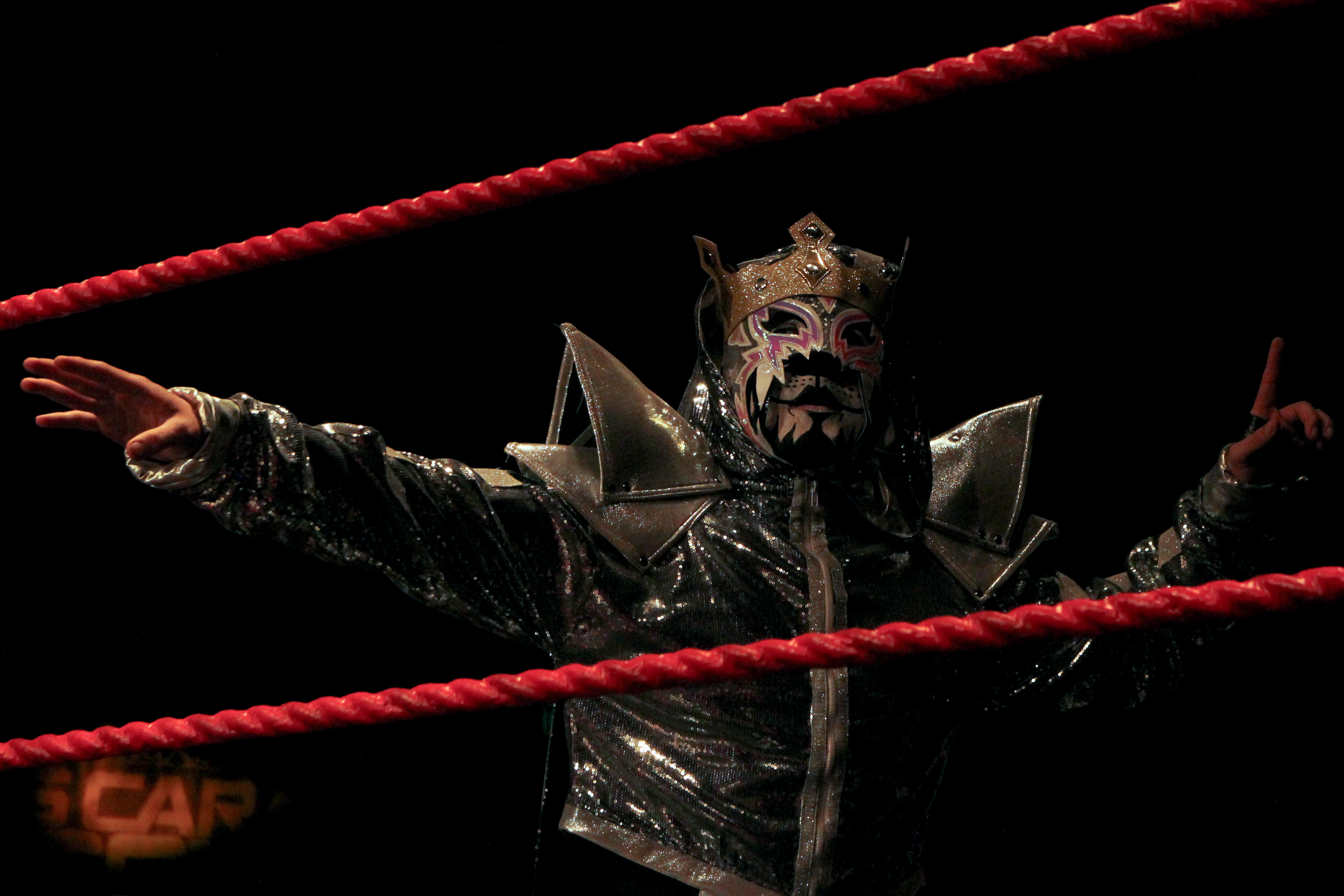
- Puma King in 2020

Personal information
- Born: July 6, 1990 (age 36) Mexico City, Mexico
- Family: Casas

Professional wrestling career
- Ring name(s): Puma King; Puma
- Billed height: 1.72 m (5 ft 7 1/2 in)
- Billed weight: 92 kg (203 lb)
- Trained by: Hijo del Gladiador; Ringo Mendoza; Rambo; El Satánico; Franco Colombo; Virus; Arkangel de la Muerte
- Debut: 2006

Puma King (born July 6, 1990) is a Mexican professional wrestler working with Lucha Libre AAA Worldwide (AAA), but also as a freelancer in many Mexican promotions such as Lucha Memes, MexaWrestling and many more.

He is best known for his time working for the Mexico City-based promotion Consejo Mundial de Lucha Libre (CMLL). Puma frequently teams with his brother, professional wrestler Tiger. Puma's real name is not a matter of public record, as is often the case with masked wrestlers in Mexico where their private lives are kept a secret from the wrestling fans. He is part of the Casas wrestling family, son of El Felino, using a ring character and a mask very similar to his father and has been trained by his uncle, professional wrestler Negro Casas.

== Professional wrestling career ==
=== Early years (2006–2008) ===
Puma is part of the Casas wrestling family, the son of Jorge Luis Casas (El Felino) and nephew of Negro Casas and Erick Casas. Originally he claimed not to be the son of Jorge Luis, but claimed to be the son of another Casas sibling that is not involved with wrestling. He made his wrestling debut in 2006 at the age of just 16, wrestling under the ring name Puma King. Neither Puma King, nor his older brother Tiger Kid, hid the fact that they were part of the Casas family, and with the use of the feline inspired names and mask that closely resembled the mask worn by El Felino it was speculated that they were the sons of El Felino. This was later denied by Puma King and Tiger Kid, claiming that they chose their names and masks as a tribute to their favorite uncle. In an interview with Súper Luchas published in early June 2010 El Felino finally revealed that he was indeed the father of both Tiger Kid and Puma King, but had kept it a secret to allow his children to succeed or fail on their own merits and not because of their family relationship to El Felino.

=== Consejo Mundial de Lucha Libre (2008–2018) ===
Puma King worked for International Wrestling Revolution Group (IWRG) not long after his debut, and although Tiger Kid also worked for IWRG the promotion only rarely used them as a team. In 2008 Puma King joined Tiger Kid in Consejo Mundial de Lucha Libre (CMLL), the same promotion their uncles worked for. Both Puma King and Tiger Kid participated in the Trofeo Generacion Del 75 torneo cibernetico match, a tournament for wrestlers signifying the "future of CMLL during their 75th year", but lost as El Hijo del Fantasma won the trophy. Puma King teamed up with Villano V to participate in the 2008 Gran Alternativa tournament. The Gran Alternativa tournament is an annual CMLL tournament that teams a veteran and a rookie (Novato) up for a tag team tournament. Villano V was originally scheduled to team with El Brujo, but due to an injury Puma King was chosen to replace him. Puma King and Villano V lost to Axxel and Blue Panther in the opening round of the tournament.

In CMLL Puma King and Tiger Kid frequently wrestle as a tag team, usually low on the card but they have made several appearances on CMLL Super Viernes, CMLL's biggest show of the week. In February, 2010 both Puma King and Tiger Kid became involved in El Felino's ongoing feud against La Sombra. It all began on February 2, 2010, where Puma King dressed up like his uncle El Felino to distract La Sombra during a match. A later doubleganger act backfired though and saw El Felino lose to La Sombra, which saw the end of the Tiger Kid/Puma King aid in the storyline. On April 23, 2010, Puma King participated in the 2010 Gran Alternativa, this time teaming with Último Guerrero. The team defeated Pegasso and Toscano in the first round and Durango Kid and El Texano, Jr. in the second round. In the finals of Block B Puma King and Último Guerrero were defeated by Delta and Volador Jr. Puma King was one of 12 men who put their mask on the line as part of a 12-man steel cage match in the main event of the 2010 Infierno en el Ring. Early in the match his own brother, Tiger Kid, had betrayed his brother in order to escape the cage. Later on Puma King feigned an alliance with rival Ángel de Oro so they could both escape, only to turn on him and escape while Ángel de Oro remained in the cage. In the end Ángel de Oro defeated Fabián el Gitano in the Lucha de Apueta (bet match) portion of the match to unmask him. Puma King competed in CMLL's first ever En Busca de un Ídolo ("In search of an Idol") tournament, but did not qualify for the semi-final part of the tournament. On September 14, 2012, at CMLL's 79th Anniversary Show, Puma King defeated Rey Cometa in a Lucha de Apuestas, forcing his rival to unmask himself.

On December 25, 2015, as part of CMLL's annual Infierno en el Ring show Puma was one of twelve men risking their mask in the main event steel cage match. He was the second man to leave the cage, keeping his mask safe in the process. On July 17, 2018, Puma announced his departure from CMLL.

=== Lucha Libre AAA Worldwide (2018–present) ===
On July 22, 2018, Puma made his debut for Lucha Libre AAA Worldwide, working the main event of their AAA vs. Elite show. He was billed as King Puma and teamed up with L.A. Park and Electroshock as representatives of Liga Elite. The trio defeated Team AAA (Psycho Clown, El Hijo del Fantasma and Rey Wagner). Puma King, El Hijo de L.A. Park, and Black Taurus represented Elite in a three-way match for the AAA World Trios Championship at Triplemanía XXVI. Team Elite and Team AAA (Mamba, Máximo, and Pimpinela Escarlata) lost to defending champions El Nuevo Poder del Norte (Carta Brava Jr., Mocho Cota Jr., and Tito Santana). In the fall of 2018 Puma King was one of 18 wrestlers competing in the Lucha Capital tournament, losing to Drago and Pentagón Jr. to be eliminated from the competition. On August 10, 2019, Taurus lost a title match for the AAA Mega Championship to champion Fénix, the match also included Laredo Kid and Taurus.

=== Independent circuit (2018–present) ===
In addition to working for AAA, Puma King began working for various Mexico, U.S. and Japan based independent wrestling promotions after leaving CMLL. His first match in the U.S. was on September 7, 2018, for PCW Ultra, defeating Jake Atlas and Maxx Stardom. In addition he has also worked matches for Impact Wrestling, All Pro Wrestling, Game Changer Wrestling and Major League Wrestling in addition to making regular appearances for Pro Wrestling Guerrilla (PWG) based in Southern California.

Having previously only worked in Japan as part of CMLL's Fantastica Mania tours, Puma King returned to Japan in late 2018 to compete for DDT Pro-Wrestling. He was one of 14 wrestlers to compete in the D-Oh Grand Prix 2019 tournament. He failed to advance from the opening round as he only defeated Daisuke Sasaki and Akito and lost the remaining four first-round matches.

On August 25, 2019, King returned to DDT Pro-Wrestling in the Summer Vacation Memories 2019 event, winning the Ironman Heavymetalweight Championship after defeating Yuki Ueno being his first title in his career after leaving the CMLL.

=== Pro Wrestling Guerrilla (2018–present) ===
Puma King made his PWG debut on September 14, 2018, as he competed in their annual Battle of Los Angeles. He lost to fellow luchador Flamita in the first round, then returned for the third day of the tournament where he, PCO, Jody Fleisch, Darby Allin and Dan Barry defeated Adam Brooks, David Starr, DJ Z, T-Hawk and Timothy Thatcher in a non-tournament match. The following month, at PWG's "Smokey and the Bandido" show, Puma King defeated Flamita and Rey Horus.

=== Impact Wrestling (2018, 2019) ===
Puma made a cameo appearance on the October 4, 2018 airing of IMPACT Wrestling during Scarlett Bordeaux's The Smoke Show, talent search edition, which also featured Jack Evans, Trevor Lee and Petey Williams. This set up an X Division match between these four the following week, which Williams won by pinning Lee. Both editions of IMPACT were taped September 13–14 at Mexico City's Frontón México Entertainment Center.

Due to AAA's alliance with American promotion Impact Wrestling, King made a special appearance on the January 12, 2019 edition of Impact Wrestling, which was taped January 11–12, 2019 at Mexico City's Frontón México Entertainment Center, was defeated by Sami Callihan. The next day, King teamed up with Aero Star, El Hijo del Vikingo and Psycho Clown in an Elimination Match where they defeated Eddie Edwards, Eli Drake, Fallah Bahh and Sami Callihan winning the Impact World Cup.

== Championships and accomplishments ==
- Consejo Mundial de Lucha Libre
  - Occidente Light Heavyweight Championship (1 time)
- DDT Pro-Wrestling
  - Ironman Heavymetalweight Championship (8 times)
- Impact Wrestling
  - Impact World Cup of Wrestling (2019) – with Aero Star, El Hijo del Vikingo and Psycho Clown
- Lucha Libre AAA Worldwide
  - AAA World Trios Championship (1 time) – with DMT Azul and Sam Adonis
- Pro Wrestling Illustrated
  - Ranked No. 406 of the top 500 singles wrestlers in the PWI 500 in 2019

== Luchas de Apuestas record ==
Winner (wager)	Loser (wager)	Location	Event	Date	Notes
Puma King (mask)	Karissma (mask)	Puebla, Puebla	Live event	May 28, 2012	(Note: Twelve-man steel cage match, also involving Dragon Lee, Espiritu Maligno, Pegasso, Stigma, Hombre Bala Jr., Skándalo, Asturiano, Súper Comando, Lestat and Milenium.)
Puma King (mask)	Rey Cometa (mask)	Mexico City	CMLL 79th Anniversary Show	September 14, 2012	
