= El Felino =

Mexican professional wrestler (born 1964)

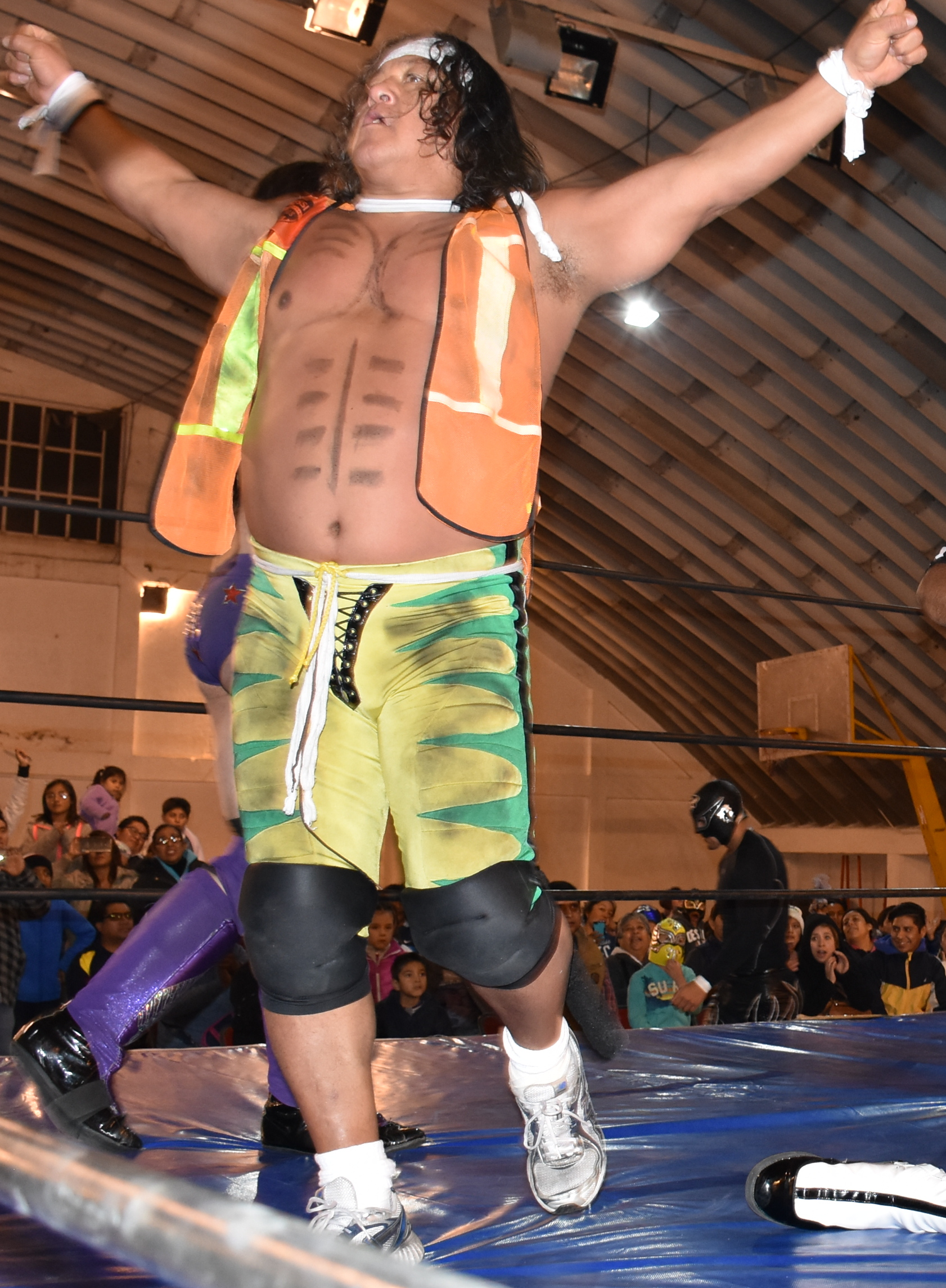
- El Felino in 2017

Personal information
- Born: Jorge Luis Casas Ruiz; March 22, 1964 (age 62) Mexico City, Mexico
- Spouse: Princesa Blanca (Note: PWI Almanac (2008) p. 71, "Son of wrestlers-turned-referee Pepe "Tropi" Casas, and married to Prinesa Blanca")
- Children: Puma King (son); Tiger (son)
- Parent: Pepe Casas (father)
- Family: Casas

Professional wrestling career
- Ring names: Babe Casas (Note: PWI Almanac (2008) p. 71, "Originally wrestled under the name "Babe Casas"."); El Felino (Note: PWI Almanac (2008) p. 71, "El Felino (5'7", 190 lb) from Mexico City"); Felino
- Billed height: 1.70 m (5 ft 7 in)
- Billed weight: 86 kg (190 lb)
- Billed from: Mexico City, Mexico
- Trained by: Pepe Casas; Raúl Reyes
- Debut: 1982

Jorge Luis Casas Ruiz (born March 22, 1964), better known by his ring name El Felino (Note: Sometimes shortened to just "Felino") (Spanish for "The Feline"), is a Mexican professional wrestler working for Mexican promotion Consejo Mundial de Lucha Libre (CMLL). Casas started his professional wrestling career under the name Babe Casas, working for the Universal Wrestling Association (UWA). In 1989, he adopted the "Felino" ring character, wearing an orange full body suit and cat inspired mask. With the exception of a short stint in AAA in 1999, Casas has worked for CMLL since adopting the "El Felino" ring character. El Felino was originally an masked wrestler, but was forced to unmask in March 2010 due to losing a match.

He is a second-generation professional wrestler, as he is the son of wrestler-turned-referee Pepe Casas and a part of the Casas wrestling family. His siblings include his older brother Negro Casas and younger brother Heavy Metal. He is also the uncle of wrestlers Canelo Casas, Danny Casas, Black Star, Destroyer and Nanyzh Rock. His sons are both wrestlers under the names of Felino Jr. (formerly Tiger) and Puma King respectively. Up until mid-2014, his wife, Blanca Rodríguez wrestled under the ring name "Princesa Blanca" but has since retired.

He was a member of the group La Peste Negra ("The Black Plague") from 2008 to 2020, with whom he has held the Mexican National Trios Championship. He has also won the CMLL World Welterweight Championship three times in his career, the Mexican National Welterweight Championship once, and the Mexican National Light Heavyweight Championship once. He has also won several major CMLL tournaments, including the 1999 Torneo Gran Alternativa, the 2001 Copa Ovaciones and the 2002 Leyenda de Plata.

== Personal life ==
Jorge Luis Casas Ruiz was born on March 22, 1964, son of professional wrestler Pepe Casas, best known as wrestling referee Pepe "Tropi" Casas later on, and part of the Casas wrestling family, spanning three generations of wrestlers. (Note: Mondo Lucha Libre (2007) p. 129 Chapter: Okay... what is Lucha Libre?) Jorge Casas' older brother José would later become known under the ring name Negro Casas, while his younger brother, Erick Francisco Casas, would be known as Heavy Metal.

For years, Casas was married to Blanca Rodríguez, who is known as professional wrestler Princesa Blanca. Prior to his relationship with Rodríguez, Casas had three children with his previous wife, known as Rocky Casas, Puma King and Tiger. (Note: Traditionally Mexican sources will not report on the birth name of a masked wrestler who has never been unmasked in the ring.) His sister-in-law, wife of José, is a professional wrestler known as Dalys la Caribeña; through that marriage, he is related to Rafael Ernesto Medina Baeza, known as Veneno. His nephews and niece, Canelo Casas, Danny Casas, Destroyer and Nanyzh Rock are also second-generation professional wrestlers. Rodríguez and Casas separated in the summer of 2014, which ultimately contributed to her retirement.

== Professional wrestling career ==
=== Early career (1982–1989) ===
After training under his father and Raúl Reyes, he made his in-ring debut in 1982, using the ring name "Babe Casas". Early in his career, he worked for the Universal Wrestling Association (UWA). His first recorded professional wrestling championship was the Naucalpan Lightweight Championship, which he lost to El Pantera I on January 27, 1985. Around the same time, Casas lost a Lucha de Apuestas ("bet match") to him on two different occasions, meaning that he was shaved bald as a result. On January 29, 1989, he pinned Mario Prado Jr. for his first Lucha de Apuestas victory, forcing Prado to have his hair shaved off.

=== Consejo Mundial de Lucha Libre (1989–1999) ===
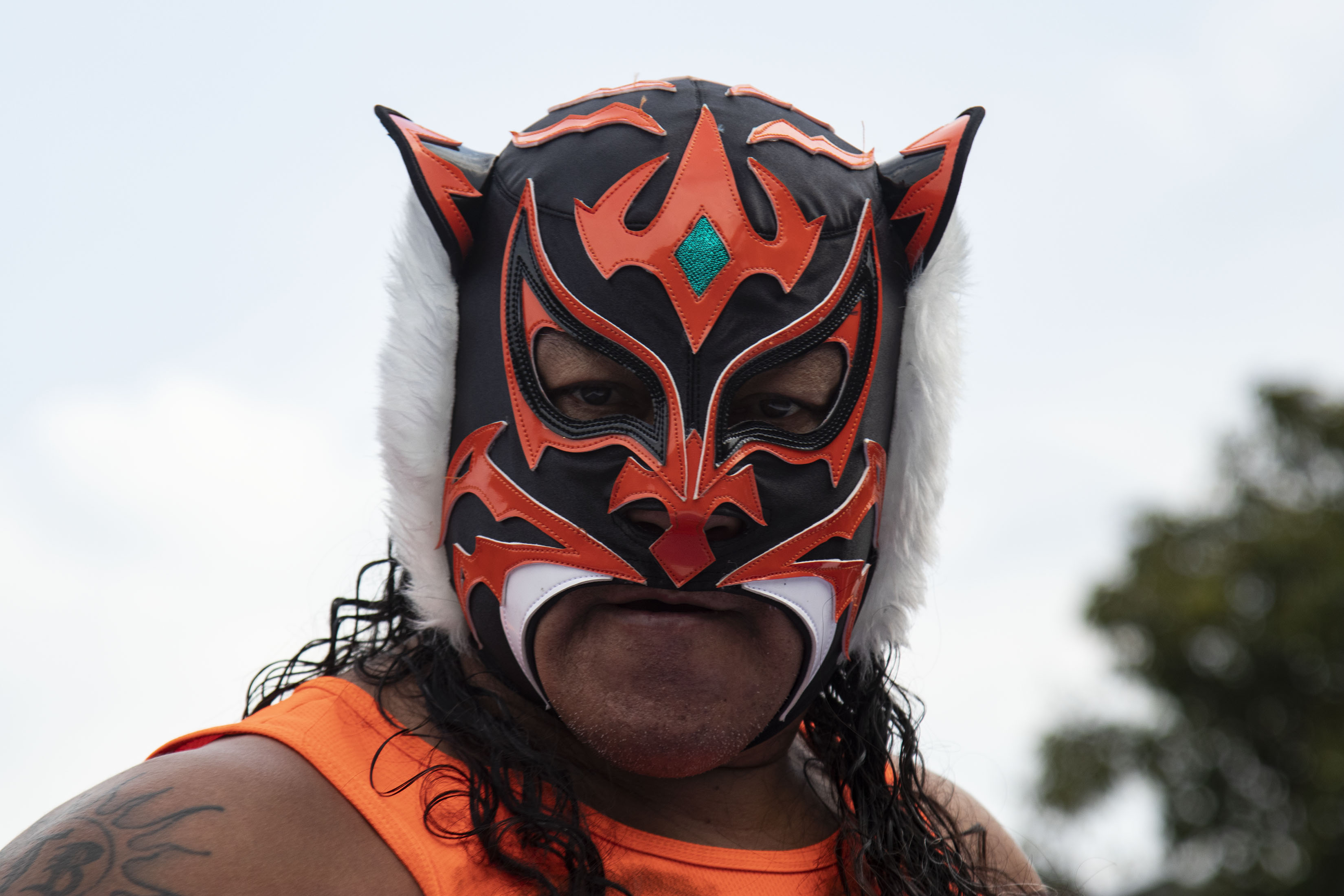
The mask Casas wore until 2010.

Casas debuted for Consejo Mundial de Lucha Libre (CMLL) in 1989 as the masked tecnico (Note: A tecnico, also known as a face, are the people who portray the "good guys" in professional wrestling.) "El Felino" (The Feline"), wearing an orange mask with black tiger stripes and a full body suit. On July 5, 1992, as part of a long-running storyline, El Felino defeated Ciclón Ramírez to win the Mexican National Welterweight Championship. (Note: Duncan & Will (2000) p. 392, Chapter Mexico: Mexican National Welterweight Title [Lutteroth] Felino 1992/07/05 Mexico City (Vacant on 92/07/16 upon winning CMLL World Title.)) He vacated the title after winning the CMLL World Welterweight Championship on July 16, (Note: Duncan & Will (2000) p. 396, Chapter Mexico: EMLL World Welterweight Title [Lutteroth] Felino 1992/07/17 Cuernavaca) which he lost to Ramírez on May 21, 1993. (Note: Duncan & Will (2000) p. 396, Chapter Mexico: EMLL World Welterweight Title [Lutteroth] Ciclon Ramirez 1993/05/21) The storyline between the two led to a Lucha de Apuestas on July 9, which saw El Felino pin Ramírez, forcing him to remove his mask and state his name afterwards. El Felino regained the title from Ramírez on March 30, 1994, conclusively ending their storyline, (Note: Duncan & Will (2000) p. 396, Chapter Mexico: EMLL World Welterweight Title [Lutteroth] Felino [3] 2001/09/21 Mexico City) before relinquishing it to El Pantera II on June 21. (Note: Duncan & Will (2000) p. 396, Chapter Mexico: EMLL World Welterweight Title [Lutteroth] El Pantera (II) [2] 1994/06/21 Cuernava/ca)

In October 1995, El Felino was paired with Emilio Charles Jr. for the Copa de Oro ("Gold Cup"), held in honor of Oro, who died during a match in 1993. They defeated Blue Demon Jr. and Silver King in the first round and Máscara Mágica and Ringo Mendoza in the semi-finals, before losing to Chicago Express and Pierroth Jr. in the finals. Shortly after, El Felino was one of sixteen wrestlers placed in a tournament to determine a new NWA World Welterweight Champion, but was eliminated near the end by El Hijo del Santo. In May 1996, during a tournament for the vacant CMLL World Welterweight Championship, he defeated Alacran de Durango, Ángel Azteca and Ramírez to advance to the finals, where he lost to Mágica.

On February 21, 1997, El Felino defeated El Hijo del Santo for the WWA World Welterweight Championship, which he had started defending in CMLL. (Note: Duncan & Will (2000) p. 400, Chapter Mexico: WWA Welterweight Title [Mora] Felino [2] 1998/01/31 Mexico City) He lost it on October 8, (Note: Duncan & Will (2000) p. 400, Chapter Mexico: WWA Welterweight Title [Mora] El Hijo del Santo [5] 1997/10/08 Leon) but regained it on January 31, 1998. (Note: Duncan & Will (2000) p. 400, Chapter Mexico: WWA Welterweight Title [Mora] Felino [2] 1998/01/31 Mexico City) However, the championship ended up vacant after a match on March 8 ended without a conclusive winner. (Note: Duncan & Will (2000) p. 400, Chapter Mexico: WWA Welterweight Title [Mora] Title held up after a match between Felino and El Hijo del Santo on 98/03/08 in Monterrey.) Four months later, El Hijo del Santo defeated El Felino to claim the title once more. (Note: Duncan & Will (2000) p. 400, Chapter Mexico: WWA Welterweight Title [Mora] El Hijo del Santo [6] 1998/07/13 Puebla Defeats Felino in rematch.) El Felino competed in the semi-final torneo cibernetico of the Leyenda de Plata ("The Silver Legend") tournament on July 24, but was eliminated by Scorpió Jr. On April 2, 1999, he was paired with Starman for the Torneo Gran Alternativa ("Great Alternative Tournament"), in which a rookie teams with a more experienced wrestler; they lost to Mr. Niebla and Atlantico in the first round.

=== New Japan Pro-Wrestling (1998, 2005, 2012) ===
El Felino debuted for New Japan Pro-Wrestling (NJPW) in 1998 to compete in the Best of the Super Juniors tournament, which he finished with only one point, losing all but one match. He returned at the Toukon Souzou New Chapter pay-per-view on October 8, 2005, where he and Negro Casas unsuccessfully challenged Hirooki Goto and Minoru Tanaka for the IWGP Junior Heavyweight Tag Team Championship. In September 2012, he again returned as part of the Tokyo Game Show tour.

=== AAA (1999) ===
In 1999, El Felino left CMLL to join their rival promotion, AAA, being introduced as support for his younger brother Heavy Metal and their father in an ongoing storyline. The storyline peaked in the semi-main event of Triplemanía VII on June 11, where El Felino and Heavy Metal defeated Kick Boxer and Thai Boxer in a match where Pepe Casas' hair was on the line if the Casas brothers had lost. As a result of their victory, referee El Tirantes' hair was shaved off instead. In October, El Felino left AAA following a reported dispute with AAA president Antonio Peña.

=== Return to CMLL (1999–present) ===
==== Championship reigns (1999–2008) ====
That same month, El Felino returned to CMLL. On December 17, he and Tigre Blanco (who had a similar "wild cat" character) defeated Máscara Año 2000 and Sangre Azteca to win the Torneo Gran Alternativa. He won his third CMLL World Welterweight Championship by defeating Nosawa on September 21, 2001. On August 9, 2002, El Felino defeated Black Warrior to win that year's Leyenda de Plata. He lost the championship to El Satánico on November 25, 2003, but rebounded by winning the vacant Mexican National Trios Championship alongside Safari and Volador Jr. on December 5, defeating Alan Stone, Super Crazy and Zumbido in a tournament final. (Note: ''Lucha 2000 (2004) p. 12, Numero 23 – Felino, Safari y Volador, Jr. 12 diciembre 2003 en Arena México [Eng: Number 23 – Felino, Safari and Volador, Jr. December 12, 2003 in Arena México]) At Homenaje a Dos Leyendas ("Homage to Two Legends") on March 19, 2004, they successfully defended the championship against Olímpico, Super Crazy and Zumbido. The reign lasted 476 days, as they lost it on March 25, 2005, to Pandilla Guerrera ("Gang of Warriors"; Azteca, Dr. X and Nitro). (Note: ''Lucha 2000 (2004) p. 12, Numero 24 – Dr. X, Nitro y Safari (Pandila Guerrera) 25 marzo 2005 en Arena México [Eng: Number 24 – Dr. X, Nitro y Safari (Pandila Guerrera) March 24, 2005 in Arena México])

==== La Peste Negra (2008–2020) ====
In July 2008, Mr. Niebla returned to CMLL, forming the rudo group La Peste Negra ("The Black Plague") with Negro Casas and Heavy Metal, which had a more comical approach to wrestling. They wore large afro wigs, painted their faces black and danced during their entrances, generally working a less serious style of match. On September 2, El Felino turned rudo and joined La Peste Negra. At the CMLL 76th Anniversary Show on September 18, 2009, after Místico defeated Casas in a Lucha de Apuestas, he challenged El Felino, Casas' cornerman, to a future Lucha de Apuestas, although nothing came of it. On January 29, 2010, he was paired with Azteca for the Torneo Nacional de Parejas Increibles ("National Incredible Pairs Tournament"), which paired rudos with tecnicos, but lost to Héctor Garza and Toscano in the first round.

During a singles match against La Sombra on February 2, when tied at one fall each, El Felino's son Puma King appeared in an El Felino outfit and mask, distracting both the referee and La Sombra long enough for El Felino to land a low blow on and pin La Sombra. On February 19, he lost to La Sombra in a lightning match (a one fall, 10 minute time limit match) by disqualification after Puma King interfered. In the main event of Homenaje a Dos Leyendas on March 19, El Felino, Místico, La Sombra and Volador Jr. fought in a four-way Lucha de Apuestas. La Sombra was the first man pinned, and El Felino was the second, forcing the two to put their masks on the line. In the end, La Sombra pinned El Felino, forcing him to unmask and announce his real name, Jorge Luis Casas Ruiz. On October 3, El Felino defeated El Gallo to win the Occidente Light Heavyweight Championship. On December 10, he lost to La Máscara in the first round of the La Copa Junior ("The Junior Cup") tournament. He lost the title back to El Gallo on January 30, 2011.

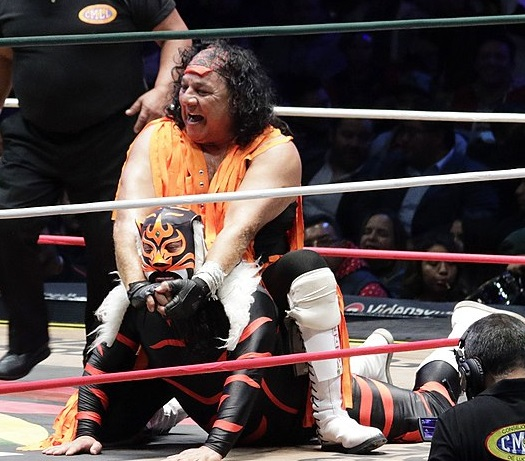
El Felino (masked) and Jerry Estrada in November 2018

As part of their feud, El Felino and La Máscara were paired for the Torneo Nacional de Parejas Increibles on February 18, defeating Psicosis and Valiente in the first round, before losing to Atlantis and Máscara Dorada in the quarter-finals. On September 30, at the CMLL 78th Anniversary Show, El Felino won the hair of Rey Bucanero in a ten-man steel cage match. In late 2011, El Felino began feuding with Blue Panther, which led to a hair vs. hair match on December 16 at Sin Piedad ("No Mercy"). A week prior, Panther was disqualified in a tag team match after giving El Felino a Martinete, leading to the Distrito Federal Box y Lucha Commission announcing that Panther was suspended for two weeks, starting after the event. At Sin Piedad, El Felino was disqualified and ultimately shaved bald after the referee caught him going for a Martinete on Panther in an act of revenge. On March 1, 2013, El Felino and El Hijo del Fantasma lost in the first round of the Torneo Nacional de Parejas Increibles to La Máscara and Averno. On March 15, El Felino and his sons, Tiger and Puma, defeated Delta, Guerrero Maya Jr. and Tritón at Homenaje a Dos Leyendas.

On February 18, 2014, La Peste Negra defeated La Máscara, Rush and Titán to win the Mexican National Trios Championship. Being a champion allowed El Felino to participate in the Universal Championship tournament on August 15, where he lost in the first round to Shocker. They lost the title to Los Reyes de la Atlantida (Atlantis, Delta and Guerrero Maya Jr.) on April 26, 2015. El Felino, Casas and Mr. Niebla lost to Dragon Lee and Sky Team (Místico and Valiente) on September 18 at the CMLL 82nd Anniversary Show. In late 2015 into early 2016, El Felino became involved in a storyline feud with Super Crazy, which was split between CMLL and Lucha Libre Elite shows. On February 28, El Felino was forced to be shaved bald after losing to Super Crazy in a Lucha de Apuestas. The rivals reluctantly joined forces in the Torneo Nacional de Parejas Increíbles on April 15, losing to Boby Z and Dorada in the first round.

At the CMLL 84th Anniversary Show on September 16, 2017, La Peste Negra defeated Kraneo, Rush and Sam Adonis by disqualification. Afterwards, CMLL held a tournament for family teams called Copa Dinastia ("Dynasties Cup"); El Felino, Tiger and Puma lost to Lee, Mistico and Pierroth in the semi-finals on November 24. On December 1, Lee eliminated El Felino in the La Copa Junior VIP ("The Junior VIP Cup") tournament. At the CMLL 85th Anniversary Show on September 14, 2018, he, Casas and Mephisto lost to Ángel de Oro, Audaz and Niebla Roja. The 2019 version of the tournament saw El Felino and Casas lose to Flyer and Volador Jr. in the opening round on June 7. On June 24, he and Tiger unsuccessfully challenged Esfinge and Tritón for the CMLL Arena Coliseo Tag Team Championship.

==== Feud with Bárbaro Cavernario (2020–2021) ====
On January 24, 2020, at La Noche de Mr. Niebla ("The Night of Mr. Niebla"), El Felino and Bárbaro Cavernario faced each other on opposite sides in a Relevos Increíbles six-man tag team match between members of La Peste Negra. They would repeatedly attack each other throughout the match, which ended in a disqualification when Cavernario cheated to win the final fall over El Felino. Afterwards, he hoped that La Peste Negra would continue, but Cavernario announced that, without Mr. Niebla (who died the month prior), the stable should be disbanded. In the weeks that followed, El Felino and Cavernario were involved in multiple confrontations, leading to them both agreeing to a hair vs. hair match at Homenaje a Dos Leyendas. Meanwhile, El Felino was paired with Niebla Roja for the Torneo Nacional de Parejas Increíbles on February 14, defeating Dulce Gardenia and Okumura in the first round before losing to Carístico and Forastero in the quarter-finals. On February 28, El Felino caused Cavernario to lose the finals of the tournament, distracting him long enough that he was pinned for the third and final fall. On March 6, El Felino and Tiger participated in a 16-team tournament for the revived Mexican National Tag Team Championship, defeating Drone and Esfinge in the first round and Rey Bucanero and Shocker in the quarter-finals, before losing to Atlantis Jr. and Flyer in the semi-finals.

In August, the hair vs. hair match was postponed in the wake of the COVID-19 pandemic. On March 6, 2021, El Felino was the second wrestler eliminated in the La Copa Junior VIP. On April 17, in a tournament for the Mexican National Trios Championship, Esfinge, Flyer and Titán defeated El Felino, Felino Jr. and Casas in the quarter-finals. El Felino and Cavernario revived their feud on June 18 when they were paired for that year's Torneo Nacional de Parejas Increíbles, in which they were unable to get along and lost to Ángel de Oro and Mephisto in the first round. On June 29, El Felino defeated Cavernario for the Mexican National Light Heavyweight Championship, hitting him with a low blow as the referee was dealing with Casas. At the rescheduled Homenaje a Dos Leyendas on September 17, El Felino was defeated by Cavernario in the hair vs. hair match, thus being shaved bald afterwards and ending their feud. On October 12, he lost the championship to Ángel de Oro, ending his reign at 105 days.

==== Teaming with Felino Jr. (2021–present) ====
Following the event, El Felino began teaming regularly with his son Felino Jr. On October 16, 2022, they participated in a tournament to determine the number one contenders for the CMLL World Tag Team Championship, defeating Arkalis and Pegasso in the quarter-finals before losing to Los Gemelos Diablos (Gemelo Diablo I and Gemelo Diablo II) in the semi-finals. On May 24, 2024, El Felino competed in the semi-final torneo cibernetico of that year's La Copa Junior VIP, where he scored the first elimination over El Hijo del Villano III before being the third wrestler eliminated by Atlantis Jr. Heading into the following year, El Felino feuded with Rey Bucanero, with the two constantly issuing challenges for retirement matches. Their feud culminated in what was their third hair vs. hair match at the CMLL 92nd Anniversary Show on September 19, 2025, where both men fought to a double disqualification, thus forcing both Bucanero and El Felino to be shaved bald as a result.

=== Ring of Honor (2019) ===
Through CMLL's working relationship with Ring of Honor (ROH) in the United States, El Felino made his ROH debut at Saturday Night At Center Stage on August 24, teaming with Okumura and Silas Young to defeat The Shinobi Shadow Squad (Cheeseburger, Eli Isom and Ryan Nova). The next night, as part of the Honor for All supercard, he and Okumura lost to The Bouncers (Brian Milonas and Beer City Bruiser).

== Other media ==
In October 2011, El Felino was one of four CMLL wrestlers featured in an A&E Latinoamericano documentary series titled El Luchador.

== Championships and accomplishments ==
- Consejo Mundial de Lucha Libre
  - CMLL World Welterweight Championship (3 times) (Note: Duncan & Will (2000) p. 396, Chapter Mexico: EMLL World Welterweight Title [Lutteroth] Felino [2] 1994/03/30 Acapulco)
  - CMLL Torneo Gran Alternativa (December 1999) – with Tigre Blanco
  - Leyenda de Plata (2002)
  - Mexican National Light Heavyweight Championship (1 time)
  - Mexican National Welterweight Championship (1 time)
  - Mexican National Trios Championship (2 times) – with Volador Jr. and Safari (1), and Mr. Niebla and Negro Casas (1)
  - Occidente Light Heavyweight Championship (1 time)
  - Copa Ovaciones: 2001 – with Fuerza Guerrera
  - Copa Bobby Bonales 2019
- Distrito Federal
  - Distrito Federal Trios Championship (1 time) – with Arkangel and Guerrero de la Muerte (Note: Duncan & Will (2000) p. 401, Chapter Mexico: Distrito Federal Trios Title […] Arkangel, Felino & Guerrero de la Muerte ?? […])
- International Wrestling Revolution Group
  - IWRG Intercontinental Tag Team Championship (1 time) – with El Pantera
  - IWRG Intercontinental Trios Championship (1 time) - Negro Casas and Heavy Metal
- Pro Wrestling Illustrated
  - PWI ranked him # 58 of the 500 best singles wrestlers in the PWI 500 in 1999.
- Universal Wrestling Association
  - Naucalpan Lightweight Championship (1 time)
- World Wrestling Association
  - WWA Welterweight Championship (2 times)

== Luchas de Apuestas record ==
Winner (wager)	Loser (wager)	Location	Event	Date	Notes
Pantera (Note: The original Pantera, not Pantera, who originally worked as "Pantera II") (mask)	Babe Casas (hair)	N/A	UWA show	N/A	
Pantera (mask)	Babe Casas (hair)	N/A	UWA show	N/A	
Babe Casas (hair)	Mario Prado Jr. (hair)	N/A	UWA show	January 29, 1989	
El Felino (mask)	Guerrero Imperial (mask)	N/A	CMLL show	N/A	
El Felino (mask)	Guerrero Águila (mask)	N/A	CMLL show	N/A	
El Felino (mask)	El Comandante (mask)	N/A	CMLL show	N/A	
El Felino (mask)	El Predicador (mask)	N/A	CMLL show	N/A	
El Felino (mask)	Negro Navarro (hair)	N/A	CMLL show	N/A	
El Felino (mask)	El Signo (hair)	N/A	CMLL show	N/A	
El Felino (mask)	Ciclón Ramírez (mask)	Mexico City	CMLL show	July 9, 1993	
El Felino (mask)	Justiciero (mask)	Guadalajara, Jalisco	CMLL show	October 28, 1994	
El Felino and Heavy Metal (hair of Pepe Casas)	Kick Boxer and Thai Boxer (hair of El Tirantes)	Tamaulipas	Triplemanía VII	June 11, 1999	(Note: El Felino and Heavy Metal defeated Kick Boxer and Thai Boxer in a match where the hair of their seconds (Pepe Casas and Tirantes) was on the line, not the wrestlers' hair itself.)
El Felino (mask)	Brazo de Plata (hair)	Tijuana, Baja California	Indy show	June 23, 2000	(Note: El Felino and Brazo de Plata lost a Relevos suicida match to El Hijo del Santo and Pierroth, Jr. and had to wrestle each other right away.)
El Felino (mask)	Bestia Negra (mask)	Tamaulipas	Indy show	April 21, 2002	
El Felino (mask)	Perro Ruso (hair)	Los Angeles, California	Indy show	June 3, 2007	
La Sombra (mask)	El Felino (mask)	Mexico City	Homenaje a Dos Leyendas	March 19, 2010	(Note: They were the first two men eliminated in a Relevos suicida match that also included Místico and Volador Jr., as a result they had to wrestle each other.)
El Felino (hair)	Rey Bucanero (hair)	Mexico City	CMLL 78th Anniversary Show	September 30, 2011	(Note: The last two men in a 10-man steel cage match that also included Rush, Mr. Águila, El Terrible, El Texano, Jr., Héctor Garza, Máximo, Blue Panther and Negro Casas.)
Blue Panther (hair)	El Felino (hair)	Mexico City	Sin Piedad	December 16, 2011	
Rey Bucanero (hair)	El Felino (hair)	Mexico City	Infierno en el Ring	December 5, 2014	(Note: The last two men in a 10-man steel cage match that also included Bárbaro Cavernario, Blue Panther, Marco Corelone, Máximo, Shocker, El Terrible, Último Guerrero and Volador Jr.)
Super Crazy (hair)	El Felino (hair)	Mexico City	Lucha Elite show	February 28, 2016	
Bárbaro Cavernario (hair)	Felino (hair)	Mexico City	Homenaje a Dos Leyendas	September 17, 2021	
	Rey Bucanero (hair) and Felino (hair)	Mexico City	CMLL 92nd Anniversary Show	September 19, 2025	(Note: The match ended in a double disqualification, thus both men got their head shaved.)
