= Los Rayos Tapatío =

Professional wrestling tag team

Tag team
- Members: Rayo Tapatío I Rayo Tapatío II
- Name: Los Rayos Tapatío
- Billed heights: 1.72 m (5 ft 7 1/2 in) (Rayo Tapatío I); 1.78 m (5 ft 10 in) (Rayo Tapatío II)
- Combined billed weight: 76 kg (168 lb) (Rayo Tapatío I); 87 kg (192 lb) (Rayo Tapatío II); 163 kg (359 lb) (Combined)
- Billed from: Guadalajara, Mexico
- Debut: February 18, 1983 (Rayo Tapatío I); October 16, 1988 (Rayo Tapatío II); 1990–1991 (Los Rayos Tapatío)

Los Rayos Tapatío (Spanish for "The Lightning bolts from Guadalajara") is a Mexican sibling professional wrestling tag team consisting of Jesús González Monroy and Víctor Manuel González Monroy, better known under their ring names Rayo Tapatío I and Rayo Tapatío II. The team is the longest, continuously active tag team in Mexico today, possibly in professional wrestling in general. Los Rayos Tapatío worked for many years for the Mexican professional wrestling promotion Consejo Mundial de Lucha Libre (CMLL) portraying both rudos ("Bad guys") and tecnico ("Good guy") wrestling characters. They originally worked for the now defunct Universal Wrestling Association (UWA) and now primarily works for various Mexican Regional promotions.

== Personal life ==
Jesús González Monroy was born on May 24, 1968 and Víctor Manuel González Monroy was born on August 16, 1971, both in Mexico City, Mexico The older brother Jesús González began training for his professional career in the early 1980s by El Indio Yoko, Tony Camargo, Jose Luis Feliciano and Guillermo Dìaz His younger brother began training after Jesús González began wrestling, working with the same trainers as his older brother as well as Gran Petroneo.

== Professional wrestling career ==
Jesús González Monroy made his in-ring debut on February 18, 1983, adopting the ring name El Rayo Tapatío (The Lightning from Guadalajara). A few years later his younger brother Víctor Manuel González began wrestling as Principe Delfin ("Prince Dolphin"), but would later join his brother as a regular tag team around 1990/1991, adopting the moniker Rayo Tapatío II, with his brother modifying his name to Rayo Tapatío I. After their debut they began working regularly for the Universal Wrestling Association (UWA), which at the time was one of the two biggest professional wrestling promotions in Mexico. Records are unclear on who Los Rayos Tapatío defeated, but they show that the team won the Distrito Federal Tag Team Championship for the first time out of five in 1992. Los Rayos would lose, then regain the titles as part of an ongoing storyline with a team known as Los Diamicos in early 1993. UWA held a one night, 16 team tag team tournament with Los Rayos competing for the rights to challenge for the UWA World Tag Team Championship, the team lost to Black Jack and Enrique Vera in the first round. The UWA closed down in 1995 and briefly worked for Lucha Libre AAA World Wide (AAA) who was rapidly growing, soon becoming the second biggest promotion in Mexico. During this time period Los Rayos would hold the Distrito Federal Tag Team Championship for a third time.

=== Consejo Mundial de Lucha Libre (1998–2012) ===
The brothers began working for Consejo Mundial de Lucha Libre (CMLL), Mexico's biggest and the world's oldest still active wrestling promotion in 1998. CMLL also allowed Los Rayos to still work on the Independent circuit, allowing them to still compete for the Distrito Federal Tag Team Champion as well as defend the UWA Tag Team Championship in 2000. This was either the physical UWA championship belts that Los Rayos were in possession off or the Distrito Federal title belts, just billed as the UWA titles to allow them to defend them outside of Mexico City. (Note: In Mexico championships on the independent circuit are more of a propaganda tool, using them even after the promotion they represented had closed.) At one point Los Rayos lost the "UWA World Tag Team Championship" to the Japanese team of NOZAWA and MAZADA, allowing them to claim the title for their home promotion, or at least that is what the Japanese team claimed when they started defending the titles in the El Dorado Wrestling promotion in 2008. On Los Rayos lost a set of tag team championships to El Endeivor and Vuelo Especial, which was more likely the Distrito Federal Tag Team championship, a title they would regain later on. Los Rayos entered a tournament for the newly reactivated CMLL Arena Coliseo Tag Team Championship, taking part in an 8-team tournament. The duo lost to Virus and Fugaz in the first round. Over the years the seasoned tecnicos ("good guys") became a low to mid-card team, whose primary role was to work with various CMLL rudo ("bad guys") rookies, helping them gain invaluable in-ring experience and help them prepare for higher profile storylines. in 2008 Los Rayos Tapatío entered a tournament where the winning team would get a chance to challenge for the CMLL Arena Coliseo Tag Team Championship, but the experienced team lost to Los Infernales (Euforia and Nosferatu) in the opening round.

In 2011 CMLL decided to turn Los Rayos Tapatío from tecnico to rudo, changing their alignment to allow them to work an extended storyline against CMLL's Generacion 2011, a group of CMLL newcomers who joined the company in 2011. Los Rayos Tapatío and a number of low or mid-card Rudos such as Inquisidor and Apocalipsis fought Generacion 2011, Dragon Lee, Magnus, Hombre Bala Jr. and Super Halcón Jr. Originally the focus was on Los Rayos and Dragon Lee, playing off Los Rayos feeling that Dragon Lee was an arrogant rookie who had not "paid his due", but when Dragon Lee was injured plans had to be changed. The focus shifted towards Hombre Bala Jr. and included Los Rayos wrestling on the CMLL 78th Anniversary Show losing to Hombre Bala Jr. and Ángel Azteca, Jr. in the opening match of the show. Soon CMLL added Super Halcón, Jr., focusing the Generacion 2011 vs. veteran rudos on those two teams. The two sides faced off several matches where the two teams would focus more on each other than the other men in the matches. As the storyline escalated the four wrestlers involved would tear at each other's masks, at times winning by pulling the mask off the other one to gain an unfair advantage, escalating the conflict. After months of escalating the storyline CMLL finally announced that the two teams would face off in a Lucha de Apuesta ("Bet Match") where both teams would put their masks on the line and would be forced to unmask if they lost the match. The Luchas de Apuestas match took place on CMLL's first show of 2012 in Arena Mexico. The young team defeated the veterans, earning them their first major victory in CMLL. Following the match Los Rayos discussed possibly leaving CMLL, humiliated by the loss of their masks. This would indeed mark their last appearance for CMLL.

=== Mexican Independent Circuit ===
After the mask loss Los Rayos Tapatío left CMLL and only worked occasionally on the Mexican independent circuit. One commentator speculated that Los Rayos Tapatío were in the waning part of their career after losing their masks. After being active as a team since 1990 or 1991 Los Rayos Tapatío have become the longest continuously team, still active tag team in Mexico, perhaps even in all of wrestling.

== Championships and accomplishments ==
- Comisión de Box y Lucha Libre Mexico Distrito Federal
  - Distrito Federal Tag Team Championship (5 times)
- Comisión de Box y Lucha Libre Oaxaca
  - Oaxaca State Tag Team Championship (1 time)
- Mexican Independent Circuit
  - UWA World Tag Team Championship (1 time)

== Luchas de Apuestas record ==
Winner (wager)	Loser (wager)	Location	Event	Date	Notes
Rayo Tapatío I (mask)	Fuerza Negra (mask)	N/A	Live event	N/A	
Rayo Tapatío I (mask)	Razama (mask)	Ciudad Nezahualcóyotl, Mexico State	Live event	Unknown	
Rayo Tapatío I (mask)	Charcalo (mask)	N/A	Live event	N/A	
(mask)	Muerto del Ring (mask)	Ciudad Nezahualcóyotl, Mexico State	Live event	September 16, 1992	
Rayo Tapatío II (mask)	Mensajo de la Muerte (mask)	Ciudad Nezahualcóyotl, Mexico State	Live event	May 1, 1994	
Rayo Tapatío I (mask)	Gran Petronero (mask)	Ciudad Nezahualcóyotl, Mexico State	Live event	December 4, 1994	
Rayo Tapatío I (mask)	Fugaz (hair)	Ciudad Nezahualcóyotl, Mexico State	Live event	December 8, 1996	(Note: Lost a Relevos Suicidas match against Gran Petroneo and Rayo Tapatío I)
Draw	Rayo Tapatío I (mask); Darketo (mask)	Iztapalapa, Mexico City	Live event	October 23, 2004	(Note: Match ended in a draw, the two agreed to a rematch that never took place.)
Rayo Tapatío I (mask)	Angel Negro (mask)	Ciudad Nezahualcóyotl, Mexico State	Live event	February 19, 2006	
Los Rayos Tapatío (mask) (Rayo Tapatío I and Rayo Tapatío II)	Los Mohicanos (hair) (Mohicano I and Mohicano II)	Ciudad Nezahualcóyotl, Mexico State	Live event	January 14, 2007	
Rayo Tapatío I (mask)	Ciclon Furia (mask)	Ciudad Nezahualcóyotl, Mexico State	Live event	April 6, 2008	
Super Halcón Jr. and Hombre Bala Jr. (mask)	Los Rayos Tapatío (mask) (Rayo Tapatío I and Rayo Tapatío II)	Mexico City	CMLL show	January 1, 2012	
