= Felino Jr. =

Mexican professional wrestler

Personal information
- Born: February 12, 1987 (age 39) Mexico City, Mexico
- Family: Casas

Professional wrestling career
- Ring name(s): Felino Jr. Kid Tiger; Tiger Kid/Kidd; Tiger
- Billed height: 1.78 m (5 ft 10 in)
- Billed weight: 79 kg (174 lb)
- Trained by: El Hijo del Gladiador; Franco Columbo; Satánico; Ringo Mendoza; El Felino; Negro Casas; Virus
- Debut: May 2006

Felino Jr. (born February 12, 1987) is a Mexican professional wrestler, who works for Consejo Mundial de Lucha Libre (CMLL). He was previously known by the ring name Tiger, and before that, as Tiger Kid (sometimes spelled Tiger Kidd). He frequently teams with his brother, fellow masked wrestler Puma King.

He is a member of the Casas wrestling family, and is a son of El Felino. He uses a ring character and a mask very similar to his father and has been trained by his uncle, professional wrestler Negro Casas. His real name is not a matter of public record, as is often the case with masked wrestlers in Mexico where their private lives are kept a secret from the wrestling fans.

== Professional wrestling career ==
Felino Jr. is part of the Casas wrestling family as he is the son of Jorge Luis Casas (El Felino) and the nephew of José Casas and Erick Casas. He made his debut in February 2006, wrestling as "Kid Tiger". Neither he, nor his younger brother Puma King, hid the fact that they were part of the Casas family, and with the use of the feline inspired names and mask that closely resembled the mask worn by El Felino, it was speculated that they were the sons of El Felino. This was later denied by Tiger Kid, claiming that they chose their names and masks as a tribute to their favorite uncle. In an interview with SuperLuchas, published in early June 2010, El Felino finally revealed that he was indeed the father of both Tiger Kid and Puma King, but had kept it a secret to allow his children to succeed or fail on their own merits and not because of their family relationship.

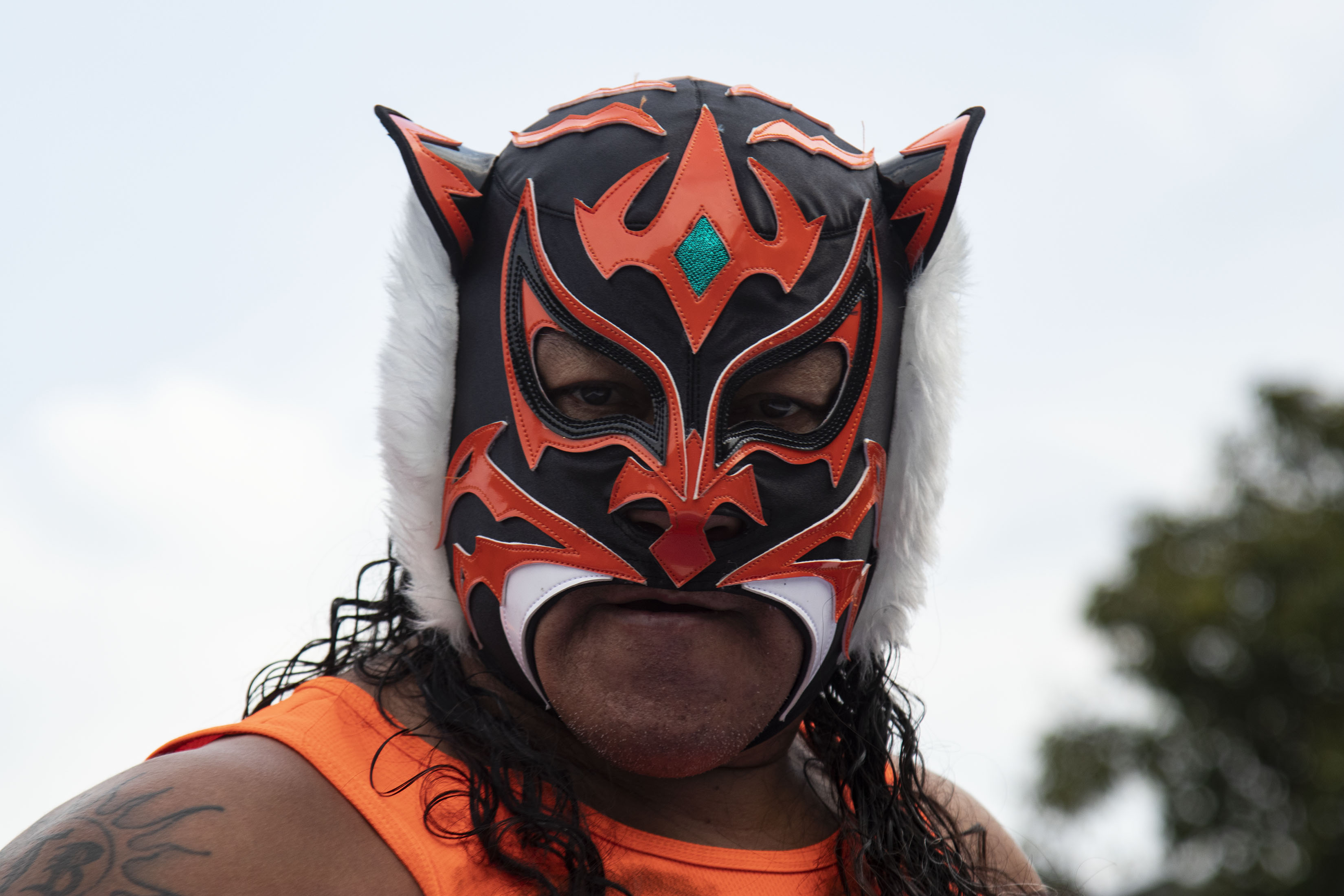
His father, while wearing the El Felino mask which Felino Jr.'s mask is based on.

Initially, Tiger Kid worked for International Wrestling Revolution Group (IWRG), but by 2007, began making appearances in Consejo Mundial de Lucha Libre (CMLL). He also trained at their wrestling school in Guadalajara, Jalisco, under CMLL trainers El Hijo del Gladiador, Franco Columbo, Satánico, Ringo Mendoza and Virus. In IWRG, he competed in both the 2005 and 2007 Rey del Ring tournaments, but was too low in the rankings and too inexperienced to do more than just make up the numbers in the tournament. By mid 2007, he worked regularly for CMLL, using the name "Tiger Kid", considered to be one of the heirs to the "Casas legacy". In 2008, his brother Puma King began working for CMLL as well, which meant that the brothers often teamed up for low-card matches.

On April 7, 2009, Tiger Kid participated in a 10-man Torneo cibernetico for the vacant CMLL World Super Lightweight Championship. The other participants included Rey Cometa, Pegasso, Pólvora, Ángel Azteca Jr., Inquisidor, Súper Comando, Ángel de Oro, Ángel de Plata and eventual winner Máscara Dorada. Tiger Kid teamed up with Mr. Niebla, a member of La Peste Negra along with his uncles Negro Casas and El Felino, to participate in the 2009 Gran Alternativa tournament. The Gran Alternativa tournament is an annual CMLL tournament that teams a veteran and a rookie (Novato) up for a tag team tournament. In the first round, Tiger Kid and Mr. Niebla defeated Blue Panther and Rey Cometa, but lost in the semi-final to Místico and Ángel de Oro. On October 18, 2009, Tiger Kid was one of 12 wrestlers who put his mask on the line in a 12-man Luchas de Apuestas cage match. He was the third person to escape the cage keeping his mask safe, the final saw Pólvora pin Tigre Blanco to unmask him.

In February 2010, both Tiger Kid and Puma King became involved in El Felino's ongoing feud against La Sombra. It all began on February 2, where Puma King dressed up like his uncle El Felino to distract La Sombra during a match. A later doppelganger act backfired though and saw El Felino lose to La Sombra, which saw the end of the Tiger Kid/Puma King aid in the storyline. Tiger Kid was one of 12 men who put their mask on the line as part of a 12-man steel cage match in the main event of the 2010 Infierno en el Ring. During the match, he pulled his own brother down off the cage, sacrificing him in order for Tiger Kid to escape the cage and keep his mask safe. In the end, Ángel de Oro defeated Fabián el Gitano in the Lucha de Apuestas ("bet match") portion of the match to unmask him. In June 2011, Tiger Kid's ring name was shortened to just "Tiger". On November 30, Tiger was introduced as the new third member of Rey Bucanero and El Terrible's rudo stable La Fuerza TRT, replacing El Texano Jr., who had left CMLL a week earlier. In March 2013, Tiger was forced to team up with Delta to compete in the 2013 Torneo Nacional de Parejas Increibles ("National Incredible Pairs Tournament") where the concept was that rivals, or at least wrestlers on opposite sides of the rudo/técnico divide would team up for a tag team tournament. Tiger and Delta had no previous rivalry and in fact wore matching colored outfits for the tournament as a sign of team unity. Despite their unity, the team was eliminated by the team of Blue Panther and Rey Escorpión in the first round of the tournament. On August 11, Terrible and Bucanero kicked Tiger out of La Fuerza TRT and gave his spot over to Vangelis.

On December 25, 2015, as part of CMLL's annual Infierno en el Ring show, Tiger was one of twelve men risking their mask in the main event steel cage match. He was the sixth man to leave the cage, keeping his mask safe in the process.

In December 2020, Tiger changed his ring name to "Felino Jr."

== Championships and accomplishments ==
- Comisión de Box y Lucha Libre Mexico D.F.
  - Mexican National Tag Team Championship (1 time) – with Pólvora
  - Mexican National Trios Championship (1 time, current) – with El Cobarde and Hijo de Stuka Jr.
- Consejo Mundial de Lucha Libre
  - Torneo Parejas Increíbles Puebla (2019) – with Diamante Azul

== Luchas de Apuestas record ==
Winner (wager)	Loser (wager)	Location	Event	Date	Notes
Tiger Kid (mask)	La Flecha (hair)	N/A	Live event	N/A	
Tiger Kid (mask)	Chamaco Àvila (hair)	N/A	Live event	N/A	
Tiger (mask)	El Hijo del Rambo (mask)	Mexico City	Expo Museo Lucha Libre	15 September 2018	(Note: Last two competitors in a Ruleta de la Muerte tournament that also included Warrior Jr., Blue Panther Jr., Dragón Rojo Jr., Gallo Tapado Jr., El Hijo del Fishman, El Hijo del Solar, El Hijo del Villano III, Magnus, Sansón, Soberano Jr., Star Jr., Stuka Jr., Trauma II and Ultramán Jr.)
