= Casas wrestling family =

Family of Mexican professional wrestlers

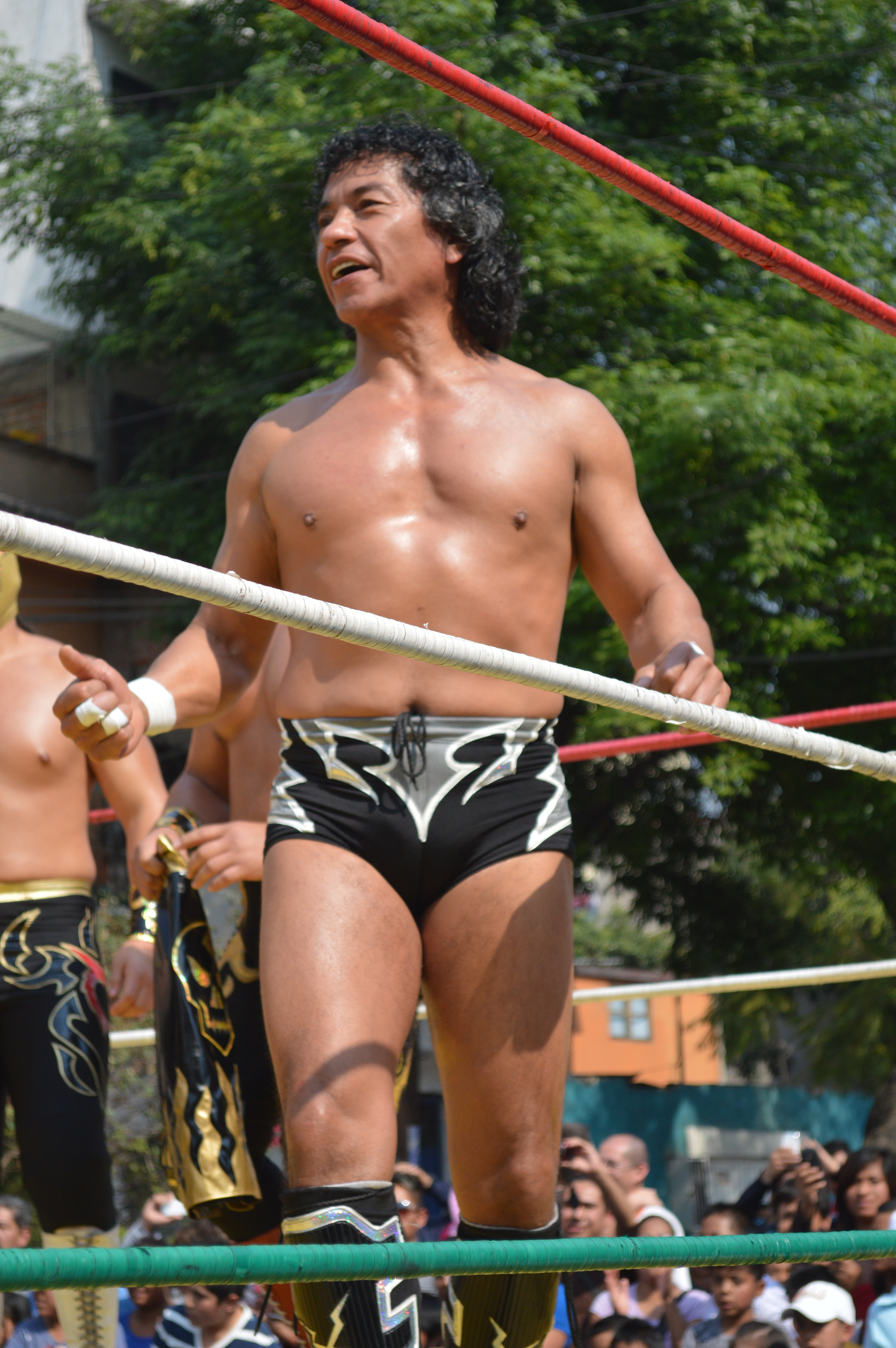
Second generation Casas, Negro Casas

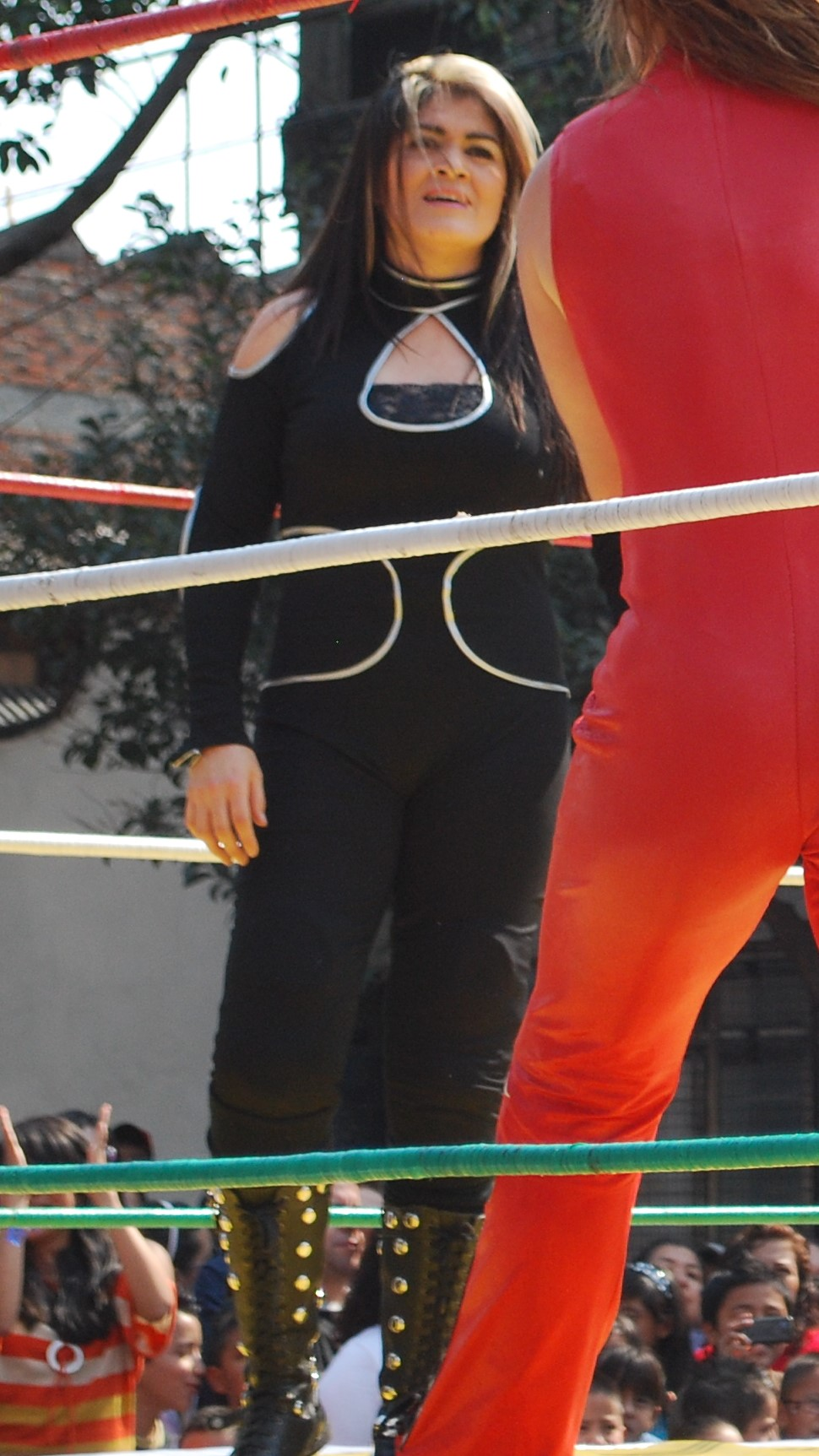
wife of Jorge Casas, Blanca Rodriguez (in black)

The Casas wrestling family, at times called La Dinastia Casas ("The Casas Dynasty") in Spanish, is a Mexican family of professional wrestlers. The Casas family perform primarily in Mexico but have made appearances in the United States, Canada, Europe and Japan over the years.

== History ==
The Casas family started in professional wrestling in 1964 when José Casas Granados started wrestling under the ring name Pepe Casas. A second-generation of Casas brothers is also active wrestlers starting with Pepe Casas' oldest son José Casas works under the ring name Negro Casas, younger siblings Jorge Luiz works as El Felino and Erick Casas is better known as Heavy Metal. Pepe Casas has at least one other son, a son who is not involved in wrestling at all but whose children are also third-generation Casas wrestlers. Jorge Luiz' sons are also professional wrestlers, working as masked wrestlers Tiger and Puma, while sons and daughters of another Casas brother (or brothers) are wrestlers are working under the ring names Canelo Casas, Danny Casas, Destroyer and Nanyzh Rock. A cousin on Pepe Casas has worked under the ring name "Black Star", one of multiple Luchadors to use that name. José Casas is married to Panamanian professional wrestler Dalys la Caribeña, whom he also trained for her in-ring career and he is the brother-in-law of Rafael Ernesto Medina Baeza, better known under the ring name Veneno ("Venum"). Jorge Luiz Casas is married to Blanca Rodriguez, who until the summer of 2014 wrestled as Princesa Blanca; Blanca Rodriquez is not the mother of Tiger and Puma. In Lucha Libre it is not uncommon for some wrestlers, especially masked wrestlers, to pay for the rights to use a well-established name and play a character that is supposedly a family member of a well known luchador family. This practice does not appear to apply to the Casas family as far as evidence suggests. but it is possible that the true parents of some of the third-generation wrestlers is not entirely accurate, for years Tiger and Puma claimed to be the nephews of Jorge Luiz (El Felino), but later revealed that they were indeed his sons but wanted to make a name for themselves instead of being "Felino Jr." or "El Hijo del Felino" ("The Son of Felino").

== Members ==
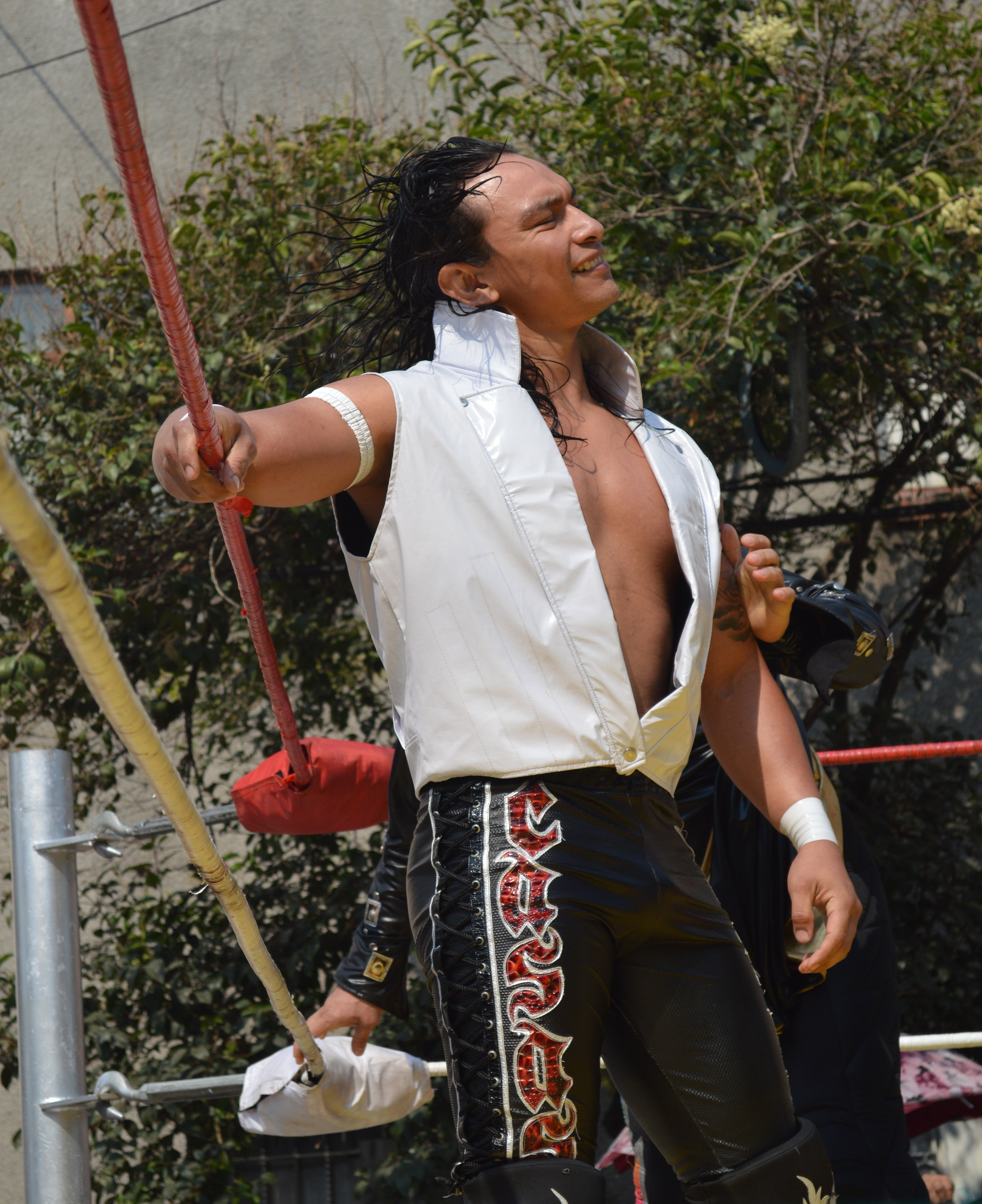
Third generation Casas, Canelo Casas.

First generation

- José Casas Granados (May 14, 1943) – Retired wrestler & referee, worked under the ring name "Pepe Casas".
- José's wife - (? - September 2025)

Second generation

- José Casas Ruiz (January 1, 1960) – Professional wrestler, works under the ring name Negro Casas.
- Jorge Luis Casas Ruiz (March 22, 1964) – Professional wrestler, works under the ring name El Felino.
- Erick Francisco Casas Ruiz (October 4, 1970) – Professional wrestler, works under the ring name Heavy Metal.
- Black Star - Real name not confirmed.
- Five unnamed sisters, who did not become wrestlers.

Third generation

- Felino Jr. (February 12, 1987) – Professional wrestler, real name not revealed.
- Puma King (July 6, 1990) – Professional wrestler, real name not revealed.
- Jorge Casas - Professional wrestler, works under the ring name Rocky Casas.
- Canelo Casas (1982) – Professional wrestler, real name not confirmed.
- Carlos Daniel Rodríguez Casas (July 13, 1986) – Professional wrestler, works under the ring name Danny Casas. Previously wrestled as Rush (not the CMLL version).
- Destroyer – Professional wrestler, birth name not revealed.
- Nanyzh Rock – Professional wrestler, birth name not revealed.
- Noris, Omaraida & Zaraida Casas Medina - daughters (eldest, middle & youngest respectively) of Negro Casas & Dalys. Trained to wrestled for over two years in the late '00s, seemingly never debuted.

Related through marriage

- Blanca Rodriguez (August 26, 1974) – Retired professional wrestler, formerly married to Jorge Luis Casas (separated in summer 2014); worked under the ring name Princesa Blanca. Not the mother of Tiger and Puma.
- Dalys la Caribeña (February 20, 1975) – Professional wrestler, married to José Casas Ruiz; Last name Medina Baeza, first name not revealed.
- Rafael Ernesto Medina Baeza (December 7, 1970) – Professional wrestler, brother-in-law of José Casas Granados; works under the ring name Veneno.
- Psycho Clown (December 16, 1985) - Professional wrestler, birth name not revealed, married to Zaraida Casas Medina. This union links the Casas family to the Alvarado wrestling family.
- Ramses de Jesús Toral (June 1, 1997 - March 17, 2022) - Professional wrestler, married to Omaraida "Omii" Casas Medina, worked under the ring name Black Warrior Jr.. This union linked the Casas family to the "Los Divinos Laguneros" wrestling family.
- Luis Meza - Professional wrestler, formerly married to one of the Casas Medina sisters (divorced by 2014), worked under the ring name Luis Mante (Diamante at the time).

Unconfirmed family relationship

- Delta - Professional wrestler (birth name not revealed); supposedly married one of the Casas Medina sisters pre-2012.

Fourth generation

Each of Negro Casas' daughters have 2 children of their own. These include Jose Giovanni, Luis Jose, Maila Aurora, Isabella and Yoani.

== Family tree ==
"Father"
Cacho Medina	José Casas Granados (Pepe Casas)	"Brother"
Alvarado wrestling family	Rafael Medina (Veneno)	Dalys la Caribeña	José Casas (Negro Casas)	Blanca Rodriguez (Princesa Blanca)	Jorge Casas (El Felino)	Erick Casas (Heavy Metal)	Casas Sibling	Black Star
Psycho Clown	Zaraida Casas	Black Warrior Jr.	Omaraida Casas	"Daughter"	Diamante /Delta	Felino Jr.	Puma King	Rocky Casas	Canelo Casas	Danny Casas	Destroyer	Nanyzh Rock

== See also ==
- List of family relations in professional wrestling
- Lucha libre
