= Virus (wrestler) =

Mexican professional wrestler

Personal information
- Born: Ricardo Amezquita Cardeño; December 9, 1968 (age 57) Mexico City, Mexico
- Website: Twitter

Professional wrestling career
- Ring name(s): Bird Boy I Bird Boy; Piratita Morgan; Damiancito El Guerrero; Damiancito; Virus
- Billed height: 1.65 m (5 ft 5 in)
- Billed weight: 79 kg (174 lb)
- Trained by: El Fuerza Aérea
- Debut: April 20, 1986

Ricardo Amezquita Carreño (born December 9, 1968), better known by his ring name Virus, is a Mexican professional wrestler. He is working for promotion Consejo Mundial de Lucha Libre (CMLL), and portrays a rudo ("Bad guy") wrestling character. Amezquita originally worked in CMLL's Minis division as Piratita Morgan, and held the CMLL World Mini-Estrella Championship under the name Damiancito El Guerrero, but was later moved into the regular division and given the name "Virus". He has served as one of the main trainers for CMLL's wrestling school, having had a hand in training hundreds of students at the CMLL school since 2008 either to some degree.

As Virus, Amezquita has held the CMLL Japan Super Lightweight Championship, CMLL World Super Lightweight Championship and the Mexican National Lightweight Championship as well as winning CMLL's annual Reyes del Aire tournament in 2007. In the Mini-Estrellas division he won the CMLL World Mini-Estrella Championship. He is the leader of Los Cancerberos del Infierno, a stable consisting of himself and Cancerbero.

== Professional wrestling career ==
=== Universal Wrestling Association (1986–1992) ===
Ricardo Amezquita made his professional wrestling debut on April 20, 1986, under the ring name "Bird Boy", an masked wrestler with a bird inspired ring persona. He briefly teamed with Bird Boy II, but due to his small size, he mainly worked on the low end of the card in the Universal Wrestling Association (UWA). On July 27, 1991, Bird Boy defeated Super Archie to win the UWA World Featherweight Championship, as a part of a storyline feud between the two. The storyline culminated in Bird Boy defeating Super Archie in a Lucha de Apuestas, or "bet match", after which Super Archie had to remove his mask. As Bird Boy, he held the Featherweight title for over a year, losing it on August 25, 1992, to El Coralillo.

=== Consejo Mundial de Lucha Libre (1992–present) ===
==== Piratita Morgan and Damiancito El Guerrero (1992–1998) ====
Amezquita had already begun working with Consejo Mundial de Lucha Libre (CMLL) before he lost the UWA World Featherweight Championship, becoming exclusive to CMLL after dropping the title. in 1992, then-CMLL booker Antonio Peña left CMLL to form his own promotion, Asistencia Asesoría y Administración (AAA); Peña had been the mastermind behind the CMLL Minis division, and most of the Minis in CMLL decided to leave with Peña. Amezquita and a number of other wrestlers were brought in to replenish the division. Working in the Mini division does not mean that Amezquita has dwarfism, it is not uncommon for very short wrestlers to work in the "Mini" division in Mexico. Ricardo Amezquita was one of the wrestlers brought into CMLL to replenish the division after losing most of their workers and was given the ring persona of Piratita Morgan, a mini version of Pirata Morgan who worked in CMLL at the time and replaced the original Piratita Morgan that had left CMLL to join AAA. He often accompanied members of Los Bucaneros (Pirata Morgan and Rey Bucanero) to the ring, and would interfere on their behalf. Due to CMLL's policy of not having regular sized and Mini-Estrellas compete in the same match, Piratita Morgan never officially teamed up with the rest of the "Bucaneros". In 1994, Pirata Morgan left CMLL to join AAA as well, negating the need to have the smaller version of the character working for CMLL.

While trying to figure out a new ring character, Amezquita was offered the name "Damiancito El Guerrero" by Alfonso Lira, who worked as Damian El Guerrero at that time. He worked his first match under that name on November 6, 1994, when he and Ultratumbita lost to Orito and Ultimo Dragoncito. When he became Damiancito, Amezquita began working unmasked without losing a Lucha de Apuestas match. In 1995, Amezquita toured Japan and worked for W*ING, where he was billed simply as "Damiancito", a mini version of Damián 666 who worked for W*ING at the time. Subsequently, he has mistakenly been described as working as "Damiancito" or "Damiancto 666" in CMLL as well, but it was only in Japan that he worked as a mini of Damián 666 and is not related to Pequeño Damián 666.

After returning from Japan, Damiancito El Guerrero defeated Máscarita Mágica to win the CMLL World Mini-Estrella Championship on February 27, 1996. The storyline between the two Mini-Estrellas later led to Damiancito defeating Mascarita Mágica in a Lucha de Apuestas bet match, where Mascarita Mágica was forced to have all his hair shaved off as a result of losing the match. In late 1997, CMLL booked an eight-man elimination match where the winner would earn the right to tag team with "regular sized" wrestlers. Damiancito El Guerrero defeated Cicloncito Ramírez, Tritoncito, Pequeño Cochisse, Platita, Guerrerito del Future, Pequeño Sayama and Fierito to earn the right to work with "regular sized" wrestlers.

==== Virus (1998–present) ====
In early 1998, he made his debut as part of the regular-sized division under the name "Virus"; no mention was made that Virus used to work as Damiancito El Guerrero or that he still held the CMLL World Mini-Estrella Championship. On May 7, 1998, Virus defeated El Oriental to win the vacant Mexican National Lightweight Championship, a title CMLL had brought back to help showcase smaller workers like Virus. He began a storyline feud against El Oriental, which centered around Virus' Mexican Lightweight title and Orientál's Districto Federatl Lightweight title. Despite several title matches, neither belt changed hands during the course of the storyline. By 1999, CMLL decided that it was time to crown a new World Mini-Estrella Champion, as Virus was still technically the champion despite not having worked as a mini for more than a year. Instead of making Virus return to the Minis division to lose the title, CMLL decided to give the championship to Ultimo Dragoncito and announced that Ultimo Dragoncito had "won" the title on an undisclosed day in October 1999. In 1999 and 2000, CMLL made several tours of Japan to establish a 'CMLL Japan' branch; Virus was one of the workers who regularly toured Japan and captured the CMLL Japan Super Lightweight Championship on November 25, 1999. On August 6, 2000, Virus lost the CMLL Japan Super Lightweight title to Ricky Marvin, who also defeated Virus for the Mexican National Lightweight title on November 29. Virus continued to show that while he may not have had the size to be a headliner, he had a knack for helping young wrestlers improve by working with them in the ring.

On August 21, 2001, Virus participated in his first major CMLL tournament, the Torneo Gran Alternativa ("Great Alternative Tournament"), where he was teamed up with Blue Panther. In the first round, they defeated the team of Alan Stone and Mr. Niebla, but lost to Olímpico and Sicodelico Jr., who would go on to win the entire tournament. After having been a rudo (a heel, or bad guy) his entire career, Virus was turned tecnico ( aface or good guy) in 2002. In 2003, he took part in a series of matches between CMLL tecnicos, himself, Ricky Marvin and Volador Jr., and a group called "the Havana Brothers" based out of southern California that consisted of Rocky Romero, Ricky Reyes and T. J. Perkins. The well received series of matches between the six led CMLL to create the CMLL World Super Lightweight Championship. Romero became the first champion but lost the title to Virus on November 14. Virus held the title for 392 days before losing it back to Romero. In 2005, Virus was turned rudo once more and generally used to help young, high-flying tecnicos gain more experience. Over the summer of 2006, Virus represented CMLL in All Japan Pro Wrestling (AJPW)'s Junior Heavyweight League tournament. He ended up winning only one match, defeating MAZADA, but lost to Katsuhiko Nakajima and Katsushi Takemura, failing to advance in the tournament. On October 2, 2007, Virus won CMLL's recurring Reyes del Aire ("Kings of the Air") tournament, outlasting 11 other competitors in a torneo cibernetico, lastly eliminating Valiente to win the match.

When El Satánico started working a reduced schedule in late 2008, Virus became the unofficial leader of Los Infernales, teaming with Euforia and Nosferatu. With Satánico's reduced schedule, Virus also took over a large portion of the training that El Satánico had been responsible for earlier. In a later interview, he commented that he always wanted to become a trainer and was surprised at how quickly it happened.

===== Los Cancerberos del Infierno (2009–present) =====
At a CMLL press conference on November 19, 2009, it was officially announced that Virus was the leader of a new CMLL group called Los Cancerberos del Infierno (Spanish for "the Infernal Cerberos"), a group that, beyond Virus, consisted of Euforia and Pólvora, as well as two new characters, Cancerbero and Raziel. Cancerbero and Raziel previously worked under the ring names Messala and Caligula, otherwise known as Los Romanos, a low card rudo tag team. On April 15, 2010, Virus was one of eight wrestlers to compete in a steel cage match where the last man in the cage would be unmasked. The match came down to Virus and Super Brazo after Texano Jr., Máximo, Okumura, Rush, Taichi and Tony Rivera had left the cage. In the end, Virus was able to climb out of the cage as well, forcing Super Brazo to have his hair shaved off as per the Lucha de Apuestas stipulations. In late 2010, Mini-Estrella Demus 3:16 won a tournament to earn the right to work in the regular male division. Once promoted, Demus 3:16 joined Los Cancereros and almost immediately started to develop friction with Virus, as Demus 3:16 tried to take over as the leader of the group. The storyline came to a conclusion on March 11, 2011, when Virus defeated Demus 3:16 in a Luchas de Apuestas match, which let Virus keep his position as the leader of Los Cancerberos del Infierno and send Demus back into the Mini-Estrellas division.

On June 7, Virus defeated Guerrero Maya Jr. in a tournament final to regain the World Super Lightweight Championship. As a result, Virus participated in the 2011 Universal Championship tournament, but lost to Averno in the first round. In early 2012, Virus began working an extended storyline against fellow rudo Loco Max, as part of an ongoing rivalry between Los Cancerberos and Los Guerreros Tuareg. On March 12, Virus defeated Loco Max in a Lucha de Apuestas match, forcing Loco Max to have his hair shaved off. Over the summer of 2012, Euforia left Los Cancerberos to join the Los Guerreros del Infierno group, with Pólvora also leaving the group in late 2012 to team with Rey Escorpión and Dragón Rojo Jr., forming a new trio known as Los Revolucionarios del Terror. After a four-year reign, including eight successful championship defenses, Virus lost the title to Dragon Lee on April 5, 2015. At the CMLL 82nd Anniversary Show on September 18, he, Disturbio and Puma defeated Esfinge, Fuego and The Panther. On January 1, 2016, at Sin Piedad ("No Mercy"), Los Cancerberos defeated Blue Panther Jr., Esfinge and The Panther. In early 2018, Virus and Disturbio participated in a tournament for the vacant CMLL Arena Coliseo Tag Team Championship, defeating Arkangel de la Muerte and Espanto Jr. in the first round, Flyer and The Panther in the semi-finals and Magnus and Sensei in the quarter-finals, before losing to Esfinge and Tritón in the finals on March 10. In early 2019, Virus feuded with Metálico, who challenged him to a hair vs. hair match. However, Virus, frustrated by his recent losses to him, instead suggested a career vs. career match, which was made official for Juicio Final ("Final Judgement") on May 31. At the event, Virus defeated Metálico to end his 29-year career. At the CMLL 86th Anniversary Show on September 27, Virus, Misterioso Jr. and Tiger lost to Audaz, Stigma and Rey Cometa.

In February 2020, Virus and Disturbio entered a 16-team tournament for the reintroduced Mexican National Tag Team Championship, defeating Pegasso and Stigma in the first round before losing to El Hijo del Villano III and Templario in the quarter-finals. At the CMLL 87th Anniversary Show on September 25, Los Cancerberos unsuccessfully challenged Nueva Generación Dinamita (El Cuatrero, Forastero and Sansón) for the Mexican National Trios Championship. They won the now-vacant titles on April 24, 2021, defeating Guerrero Maya Jr., Star Jr. and Stuka Jr. in a tournament final. On June 25, Virus and Caristico lost to Templario and Volador Jr. in the finals of the Torneo Nacional de Parejas Increíbles. The following month, Caristico defeated Virus in the first round of the Leyenda de Plata. On May 11, 2022, Los Cancerberos vacated the championship after Raziel's sudden death the month prior and introduced Luciferno as a new member of the group. At Homenaje a Dos Leyendas on March 17, 2023, Virus lost to Titán. On September 16, at the CMLL 90th Anniversary Show, Virus, El Satánico and Fuerza Guerrera lost to Atlantis, Blue Panther and Octagón. At Noche de Campeones ("Night of Champions") on September 29, he unsuccessfully challenged Mistico for the NWA World Historic Middleweight Championship.

At Sin Salida ("No Escape") on January 2, 2026, Virus was part of a 16-man steel cage match where the last man in the cage lost his hair or mask; he managed to escape the cage and keep his hair. Virus again saved his hair by submitting Calavera Jr. I in the Octagonal Infernal, an eight-man reverse elimination match, on March 20 at Homenaje a Dos Leyendas.

=== New Japan Pro-Wrestling (2016–2024) ===
In January 2016, Virus made his debut for New Japan Pro-Wrestling (NJPW) by taking part in the CMLL and NJPW co-produced Fantastica Mania 2016 tour. On the fifth show, he unsuccessfully challenged Dragon Lee for the CMLL World Lightweight Championship.

On December 3, 2022, Virus returned to NJPW on Strong, teaming with Atlantis Jr. in a loss to Adrian Quest and Rocky Romero. At the Resurgence pay-per-view on March 21, 2023, he and Bárbaro Cavernario defeated TMDK (Bad Dude Tito and Zack Sabre Jr.). On August 30, 2024, at Capital Collision, Virus and Hechicero unsuccessfully challenged TMDK's Mikey Nicholls and Shane Haste for the Strong Openweight Tag Team Championship.

=== Major League Wrestling (2024–2025) ===
Virus made his debut for Major League Wrestling (MLW) during a taping of War Chamber II on March 29, 2024 (aired on April 20), losing to Star Jr. via submission. On April 5, 2025, at Battle Riot VII, he participated in the 40-man Battle Riot match for the MLW World Heavyweight Championship, but was eliminated by Raj Dhesi. At Symphony of Horrors on October 25, he unsuccessfully challenged Templario for the MLW World Middleweight Championship.

== Working as a trainer ==
Over the years. Amezquita has worked as one of the main trainers for CMLL's wrestling school in Mexico City and thus has had a hand in training a number of men, women and Mini-Estrellas that work for CMLL or other Mexican professional wrestling promotions. Beyond running the school during the day, his training continues on CMLL's shows where he uses his rudo role to help younger, inexperienced or lower ranked wrestlers gain more in-ring experience and further their training. Some of the wrestlers he has a significant hand in training includes Mini-Estrellas Acero, Aéreo, Mercurio and Pentagoncito, as well as female wrestlers Goya Kong, Lady Afrodita and Skadi. He also helped train several male wrestlers including Blue Panther Jr., El Cuatrero, Disturbio, Flyer, Gran Guerrero, Black Panther, Pólvora, Puma, Sansón, Soberano Jr., Star Jr., Tiger and more.

Through his behind-the-scenes role as a trainer, Amequita also got the opportunity to act as the on-screen coach a team of participants for CMLL's En Busca de un Ídolo tournament in 2013, 2014 and 2015, helping them not only improve their wrestling skills but also their stamina, wrestling characters and interactions with the crowd. In 2013, his team consisted of Misterioso Jr., Vangelis, Sangre Azteca and Tiger. For 2014, his group consisted of Guerrero Negro Jr., Hechicero, Star Jr. and Super Halcón Jr., and in 2015, he trained a group consisting of Boby Zavala, Disturbio, Esfinge, and Flyer. Vangelis won the tournament in 2013, as well as Zavala in 2015.

Wrestlers trained

- Acero
- Aéreo
- Akuma
- Andros de Plata
- Arceus
- Audaz
- Atlantis Jr.
- Ave Rez
- Black Panther
- Black Thunder
- Blue Panther Jr.
- Bugambilia
- El Cholo
- El Cuatrero
- Disturbio
- Dranser
- Flyer
- Goya Kong
- Gran Guerrero
- Guerrero Negro Jr.
- Hiroshi Yamato
- Horus
- KAI
- Lady Afrodita
- Mercurio
- Mircoman
- Nahual
- Pentagoncito Black
- Pequeño Cisne
- Pólvora
- Principe Diamante
- Psicosis Jr.
- Puma King
- Rene Guajardo III
- Sansón
- Scravos
- Skadi
- Soberano Jr.
- Star Jr.
- Súper Astro Jr.
- La Tormenta
- Tiger
- Ultraman Jr.
- Volcano

== Championships and accomplishments ==
- Consejo Mundial de Lucha Libre

- CMLL Japan Super Lightweight Championship (2 times)
- CMLL World Mini-Estrella Championship (1 time)
- CMLL World Super Lightweight Championship / CMLL World Lightweight Championship (2 times)
- Mexican National Lightweight Championship (1 time)
- Reyes del Aire (2007)
- Mexican National Trios Championship (1 time) – with Cancerbero and Raziel
- Copa Bobby Bonales 2021

- Pro Wrestling Illustrated
  - PWI ranked him #242 of the top 500 wrestlers in the PWI 500 in 2012
- Universal Wrestling Association

- UWA World Featherweight Championship (1 time)

== Luchas de Apuestas record ==
Winner (wager)	Loser (wager)	Location	Event	Date	Notes
Super Archie (mask)	Bird Boy I (mask)	Apatlaco, Mexico State	Live event	Unknown	
Damiancito El Guerrero (hair)	Mascarita Mágica (hair)	Mexico City	Live event	1996	
Virus (hair)	El Mariachi (hair)	N/A	Live event	2000	
Virus (hair)	Kato Kung Lee (hair)	Oaxaca, Oaxaca	Live event	September 2, 2001	
Virus (hair)	Tony Rivera (hair)	Mexico City	Live event	August 5, 2007	
Virus (hair)	Brazo de Platino (hair)	Acapulco de Juárez, Guerrero	Live event	December 30, 2009	(Note: Ruleta de la Muerte match)
Virus (hair)	Super Brazo (hair)	Xalapa, Veracruz	Promociones Azteca	April 15, 2010	(Note: This was a steel cage match that also included Texano Jr., Máximo, Okumura, Rush, Taichi and Tony Rivera.)
Virus (hair, leadership) (Note: If he lost Demus 3:16 would become leader of Los Cancerberos.)	Demus 3:16 (hair, division) (Note: If Demus lost he would return to the Mini-Estrellas division.)	Mexico City	Live event	March 11, 2011	
Virus (hair)	Loco Max (hair)	Puebla, Puebla	Live event	March 12, 2012	
Virus (career)	Metálico (career)	Mexico City	Juicio Final	May 31, 2019	
