= List of CMLL Super Viernes shows in 2010 =

List of Super Viernes professional wrestling shows in 2010

2010
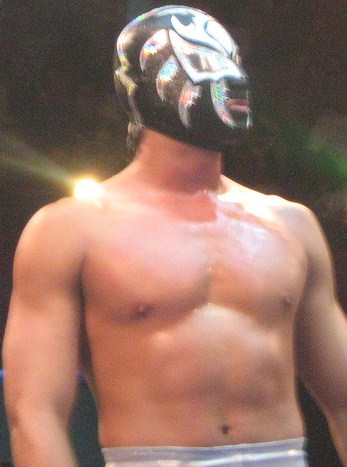
- Luchador La Sombra who wrestled the most Super Viernes matches in 2010, a total of 46 matches.

CMLL Super Viernes shows chronology
← Previous; 2009	Next → 2011

CMLL Super Viernes is professional wrestling promotion Consejo Mundial de Lucha Libre's (CMLL) Friday night wrestling show that takes place in Arena México every Friday night unless a Pay-Per-View or a major wrestling event is scheduled to take place on that night. CMLL began holding their weekly Friday night "Super Viernes" shows as far back as 1938, with 2012 being no exception. Some of the matches from Super Viernes are taped for CMLL's weekly shows that air in Mexico the week following the Super Viernes show. The Super Viernes show was replaced by four major CMLL events in 2010, Homenaje a Dos Leyendas, Infierno en el Ring, CMLL 77th Anniversary Show, Sin Piedad.

The CMLL World Heavyweight Championship (January 22), Mexican National Welterweight Championship (June 11), Mexican National Trios Championship (June 18), CMLL World Women's Championship (October 29) and the CMLL World Trios Championship (October 29) were successfully defended by the champions. Only one Lucha de Apuesta was held on a Super Viernes show in 2010, which featured Charly Manson defeating Negro Casas for the right to shave Warrior's hair off. The show traditionally hosts all the major tournaments, for 2011 that included the 2011 version of CMLL Torneo Nacional de Parejas Increibles, Torneo Gran Alternativa, Campeon Universal Del CMLL, Pequeños Reyes del Aire, La Copa Junior and the male version of the Copa Bicentenario tournaments. It also featured a one-night Trios tag-team tournament.

The shows featured 343 matches in total, 299 for the male division, 17 featuring the female division and 27 featuring the Mini-Estrellas. In 2009 148 different wrestlers appeared in matches during CMLL's Super Viernes shows. Of those 148 wrestlers 18 were Mini-Estrellas and 15 were women. La Sombra wrestled in 46 matches in total, the most of any individual wrestler, which meant that he appeared on in 15.4% of all matches. Marcela was the woman most often featured on Super Viernes with 10 matches, appearing in 58.8% of all women's matches booked for Super Viernes. Pequeño Black Warrior was the Mini-Estrella who had the most appearances, wrestling 21 times in total, or in 77.77% of all Mini-Estrella matches. Apolo Estrada Jr., Cholo, Latino, Nosferatu, Príncipe, Tony Rivera, Universo 2000, Villano IV, Ayumi, Dalys la Caribeña, Zeuxis and Tzuki all wrestled only on one Super Viernes during 2010. (Note: The statistics are supported by the source for each show.)

== Super Viernes shows of 2010 ==
#	Date	Main Event	Ref(s).
1	January 1	Brazo de Plata, Máscara Dorada and Místico defeated Los Hijos del Averno (El Terrible, El Texano Jr. and Mephisto)	
2	January 8	Héctor Garza, Jon Strongman and Místico defeated Los Guerreros de la Atlantida (Atlantis, Rey Bucanero and Último Guerrero)	
3	January 15	Héctor Garza defeated Último Guerrero	
4	January 22	Último Guerrero defeated Héctor Garza to retain the CMLL World Heavyweight Championship	
5	January 29	La Máscara and Negro Casas defeated Héctor Garza and Toscano	
6	February 5	Volador Jr. defeated Místico	
7	February 12	Volador Jr. defeated Místico to win the Mexican National Light Heavyweight Championship	
8	February 19	Héctor Garza, Último Guerrero and Volador Jr. defeated Místico, La Máscara and Negro Casas	
9	February 26	Volador Jr., La Sombra and Máscara Dorada defeated Místico and La Peste Negra (Negro Casas and El Felino)	
10	March 5	Volador Jr., La Sombra and Máscara Dorada defeated Místico and La Peste Negra (El Felino and Negro Casas)	
11	March 12	Místico and La Peste Negra (El Felino and Negro Casas) defeated Volador Jr., La Sombra and La Máscara	
–	March 19	Event replaced with Homenaje a Dos Leyendas	
12	March 26	La Sombra, Volador Jr. and Shocker defeated La Peste Negra (Negro Casas and El Felino) and Último Guerrero	
13	April 2	Brazo de Plata, La Sombra and Volador Jr. defeated Místico and La Peste Negra (Negro Casas and El Felino)	
14	April 9	La Sombr, Máscara Dorada and Místico defeated Peste Negra (Negro Casas and El Felino) and Dragón Rojo Jr.	
15	April 16	El Felino defeated Místico	
16	April 23	Blue Panther, Místico and Jon Strongman defeated Los Guerreros del Infierno (Atlantis and Rey Bucanero) and Dragón Rojo Jr.	
16	April 30	Último Guerrero, Dragón Rojo Jr. and La Ola Amarilla (Okumura and Taichi) defeated El Hijo del Fantasma, La Máscara, Jon Strongman and Místico	
17	May 7	La Ola Amarilla (Hiroshi Tanahashi, Okumura and Taichi) defeated Héctor Garza, El Hijo del Fantasma and La Máscara to win the CMLL World Trios Championship	
18	May 14	Místico and Los Guapos Internacional (Shocker and Jon Strongman) defeated Último Guerrero and La Peste Negra (Negro Casas and El Felino)	
19	May 21	Máscara Dorada, La Máscara and La Sombra defeated La Ola Amarilla (Hiroshi Tanahashi, Okumura and Taichi) to win the CMLL World Trios Championship	
20	May 28	Giant Bernard, Strongman and Shocker defeated Héctor Garza, El Terrible and El Texano Jr.	
21	June 4	Los Guerros de la Atlantida (Atlantis and Último Guerrero) and Gigante Bernard defeated Guapos International (Shocker and Jon Strongman) and Toscano	
22	June 11	Héctor Garza, Olímpico and Volador Jr. defeated Hijo del Fantasma, Místico and Negro Casas	
–	June 18	Event replaced with the 2010 Infierno en el Ring	
23	June 25	Místico, La Sombra and Shocker defeated La Peste Negra (El Felino, Mr. Niebla and Negro Casas)	
24	July 2	Místico, Shocker and La Sombra defeated La Peste Negra (Mr. Niebla, Negro Casas and El Felino)	
25	July 9	Los Invasores (Héctor Garza, Mr. Águila and Olímpico) defeated Volador Jr., La Sombra and La Máscara	
26	July 16	Los Invasores (Héctor Garza and Mr. Águila) defeated La Sombra and Volador Jr. to win the CMLL World Tag Team Championship	
27	July 23	Los Invasores (Héctor Garza, Mr. Águila and Psicosis) defeated Místico and Los Guapos International (Shocker and Jon Strongman)	
28	July 30	Místico defeated Psicosis	
29	August 6	Místico, Shocker and La Sombra defeated Los Invasores (El Alebrije, Olímpico and Psicosis)	
30	August 13	Jushin Thunder Liger defeated La Sombra	
31	August 20	La Sombra, Máscara Dorada and Místico defeated Jushin Thunder Liger, Mr. Niebla and Volador Jr.	
32	August 27	La Sombra, Místico and Shocker defeated El Terrible, Jushin Thunder Liger and Psicosis by disqualification	
–	September 3	Super Viernes replaced with the CMLL 77th Anniversary Show	
33	September 10	Los Invasores (Charly Manson, Olímpico and Psicosis) defeated La Peste Negra (Mr. Niebla, Negro Casas and Rey Bucanero)	
34	September 17	Volador Jr. defeated Místico to win the Copa Bicentenario	
35	September 24	La Sombra, Místico and Jon Strongman defeated Jushin Thunder Liger, Último Guerrero and Volador Jr.	
36	October 1	La Peste Negra (Mr. Niebla, Negro Casas and Rey Bucanero) (w/Perico) defeated Los Invasores (Charly Manson, Mr. Águila and Volador Jr.)	
37	October 8	La Sombra, Máscara Dorada and Místico defeated Los Guerreros del Infierno (Atlantis, Dragón Rojo Jr. and Último Guerrero)	
38	October 15	Show replaced with Entre el Cielo y el Infierno	
39	October 22	Los Invasores (El Alebrije, Olímpico and Psicosis) defeated La Mascara, La Sombra and Máscara Dorada	
40	October 29	La Mascara, La Sombra and Máscara Dorada defeated Los Invasores (El Alebrije, Olímpico and Psicosis) to retain the CMLL World Trios Championship	
41	November 5	Los Guerreros del Infierno (Atlantis, Dragón Rojo Jr. and Último Guerrero) defeated La Mascara, La Sombra and Místico	
42	November 12	Blue Panther, Místico and Shocker defeated Los Guerreros del Infierno (Atlantis, Dragón Rojo Jr. and Último Guerrero)	
43	November 19	Negro Casas, Rey Bucanero and Último Guerrero defeated Los Invasores (Charly Manson, El Alebrije and Mr. Águila)	
44	November 26	Los Invasores (Charly Manson, Héctor Garza and Mr. Águila) defeated Los Guerreros del Infierno (Atlantis and Último Guerrero) and Rey Bucanero	
–	December 3	Super Viernes show replace by the 2010 Sin Piedad show.	
45	December 10	Latino, Místico and Jon Strongman defeated El Terrible and Los Invasores (Héctor Garza and Mr. Águila)	
46	December 17	La Sombra, Máscara Dorada and Shocker defeated Los Invasores (Mr. Águila, Olímpico and Psicosis)	
47	December 25	Blue Panther, La Mascara and Místico defeated Atlantis, El Terrible and El Texano Jr.	
