= Homenaje a Dos Leyendas (2010) =

Mexican professional wrestling supercard show

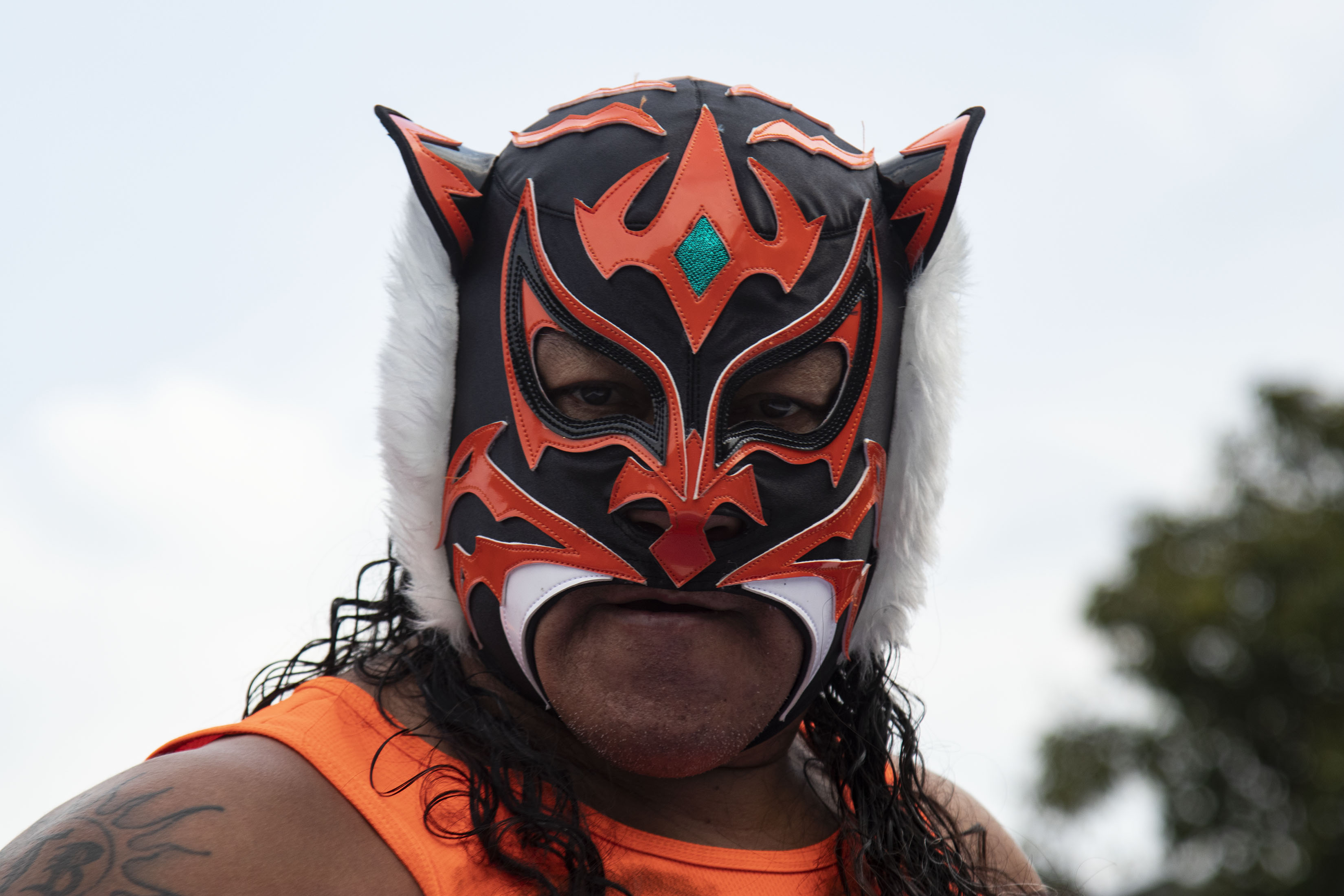
- El Felino, who lost his mask in the main event.
- Promotion: Consejo Mundial de Lucha Libre
- Date: March 19, 2010
- City: Mexico City, Mexico
- Venue: Arena México

Pay-per-view chronology
← Previous; Pequeños Reyes del Aire	Next → Torneo Gran Alternativa

Homenaje a Dos Leyendas chronology
← Previous; 2009	Next → 2011

Homenaje a Dos Leyendas (2010) (Spanish for "Homage to Two Legends") was a professional wrestling supercard show event, scripted and produced by Consejo Mundial de Lucha Libre (CMLL; "World Wrestling Council"). The Dos Leyendas show took place on March 19, 2010 in CMLL's main venue, Arena México, Mexico City, Mexico. The event was to honor and remember CMLL founder Salvador Lutteroth, who died in March 1987. Starting in 1999 CMLL honored not just their founder during the show, but also a second lucha libre legend, making it their version of a Hall of Fame event. For the 2010 show CMLL commemorated the life and career of wrestler Ray Mendoza, the father of Los Villanos (I, II, III, IV and V). This was the 12th March show held under the Homenaje a Dos Leyendas name, having previously been known as Homenaje a Salvador Lutteroth from 1996 to 1998.

The main event of the Dos Leyendas show was a Relevos Suicida ("Suicide teams") tag team match, where the first two wrestlers to be pinned in the match were then forced to face off in a Lucha de Apuestas match with their masks on the line. The match saw Místico and La Sombra face off against Volador Jr. and El Felino. La Sombra and El Felino were both pinned during the match, which led to La Sombra defeating El Felino. After his loss, El Felino unmasked and revealed his real name, Jorge Luis Casas Ruiz. The show featured a further four matches, all featuring CMLL's traditional Best two out of three falls six-man tag team match format.

== Production ==
=== Background ===
Since 1996 the Mexican wrestling company Consejo Mundial de Lucha Libre (Spanish for "World Wrestling Council"; CMLL) has held a show in March each year to commemorate the passing of CMLL founder Salvador Lutteroth who died in March 1987. For the first three years the show paid homage to Lutteroth himself, from 1999 through 2004 the show paid homage to Lutteroth and El Santo, Mexico's most famous wrestler ever and from 2005 forward the show has paid homage to Lutteroth and a different leyenda ("Legend") each year, celebrating the career and accomplishments of past CMLL stars. Originally billed as Homenaje a Salvador Lutteroth, it has been held under the Homenaje a Dos Leyendas ("Homage to two legends") since 1999 and is the only show outside of CMLL's Anniversary shows that CMLL has presented every year since its inception. All Homenaje a Dos Leyendas shows have been held in Arena México in Mexico City, Mexico, which is CMLL's main venue, its "home". Traditionally CMLL holds their major events on Friday Nights, which means the Homenaje a Dos Leyendas shows replace their regularly scheduled Super Viernes show. The 2010 show was the 15th overall Homenaje a Dos Leyendas show.

=== Storylines ===
The Homenaje a Dos Leyendas show featured six professional wrestling matches with different wrestlers involved in pre-existing scripted feuds, plots and storylines. Wrestlers were portrayed as either heels (referred to as rudos in Mexico, those that portray the "bad guys") or faces (técnicos in Mexico, the "good guy" characters) as they followed a series of tension-building events, which culminated in a wrestling match or series of matches.

The storyline featured in the main event started on January 22, 2010, during CMLL's "Torneo Nacional de Pareja Increíbles" tournament ("National Amazing Pairs tournament"). Místico and Averno faced off against Volador Jr. and El Terrible in the second round of the tournament. Místico usually wrestled as a técnico but during the match Místico's attitude seemingly changed as he began attacking Volador Jr., someone he usually teams with. Místico went so far as to ripping up Volador's mask, a rudo move, and won the match after an illegal low blow to Volador Jr. Further hints at Místico potentially turning Rudo came a few days later as Volador Jr. challenged Místico to a one on one match to settle the issue between the two. The two met in the main event of Super Viernes on February 5, 2010, and this time Místico was clearly a Rúdo, tearing so viciously at Volador's mask that a new mask had to be brought to the ring during falls. In the second fall Místico pulled his mask off and threw it to Volador Jr. in an attempt to get Volador Jr. disqualified. The end came when Volador Jr. reversed Místico's La Mística and won by applying the same move to Místico. Following the match, Místico angrily proclaimed “¡Yo soy la máxima figura de la lucha libre!”. ("I am the greatest figure in wrestling"). On February 12, 2010 Místico lost the Mexican National Light Heavyweight Championship to Volador Jr. losing two falls to one. After the match Místico beat up Volador Jr. and left the ring with the title belt. After a trios match between Místico, La Máscara and Negro Casas against Volador Jr., Último Guerrero and Héctor Garza Místico challengede Volador Jr. to a Lucha de Apuesta, or bet match, between the two with their masks on the line. During the night La Sombra came to Volador, Jr's aid while El Felino helped Místico. On March 4, 2010, it was announced that Místico and El Felino would team up to face Volador Jr. and La Sombra as the main event match of Homenaje a Dos Leyendas. The match was contested under Relevos Suicida rules, with the first two wrestlers eliminated by pinfall, submission, disqualification or count out would have to face each other in a Lucha de Apuesta match with their mask on the line.

The full card for Homenaje a Dos Leyendas, which beyond the main event did not focus on any of the current storylines in CMLL. The card featured four additional matches, all of them Best two out of three falls Six-man tag team matches.

=== Homage to Salvador Lutteroth and Ray Mendoza ===
In September 1933 Salvador Lutteroth González founded Empresa Mexicana de Lucha Libre (EMLL), which would later be renamed Consejo Mundial de Lucha Libre. Over time Lutteroth would become responsible for building both Arena Coliseo in Mexico City and Arena Mexico, which became known as "The Cathedral of Lucha Libre". Over time EMLL became the oldest wrestling promotion in the world, with 2018 marking the 85th year of its existence. Lutteroth has often been credited with being the "father of Lucha Libre", introducing the concept of masked wrestlers to Mexico as well as the Luchas de Apuestas match. Lutteroth died on September 5, 1987. EMLL, late CMLL, remained under the ownership and control of the Lutteroth family as first Salvador's son Chavo Lutteroth and later his grandson Paco Alonso took over ownership of the company.

The life and achievements of Salvador Lutteroth is always honored at the annual Homenaje a Dos Leyenda' show and since 1999 CMLL has also honored a second person, a Leyenda of lucha libre, in some ways CMLL's version of their Hall of Fame. For the 2010 show CMLL commemorated the life and career of José Díaz Velázquez, known under the ring name Ray Mendoza. While his 28-year long career saw him gain various accolades Mendoza is mostly remembered for being part of the creation of the Universal Wrestling Association (UWA) and his five sons who followed in his footsteps, working as Villano I, Villano II, Villano III, Villano IV, and Villano V. During his career, he won the NWA World Light Heavyweight Championship six times, the NWA World Middleweight Championship, the Mexican National Light Heavyweight Championship, and the UWA World Light Heavyweight Championship in Mexico as well as the NWA United National Championship and the NWA Americas Tag Team Championship four times with Mil Máscaras, Raul Mata and Raul Reyes in California.

== Results ==
No.	Results	Stipulations
1	Poder Mexica (Sangre Azteca, Dragón Rojo Jr. and Misterioso Jr.) defeated Ángel de Oro, Fuego and Stuka Jr.	Best two-out-of-three falls six-man tag team match
2	Los Hijos del Averno (Mephisto, El Texano Jr. and El Terrible) defeated El Hijo del Fantasma, Máscara Dorada and Valiente	Best two-out-of-three falls six-man tag team match
3	Blue Panther, Brazo de Plata and La Máscara defeated Ray Mendoza Jr. and La Ola Amarilla (Okumura and Taichi) by disqualification	Best two-out-of-three falls six-man tag team match
4	Héctor Garza, Negro Casas and Máximo defeated Los Guerreros del Atlantida (Atlantis, Rey Bucanero and Último Guerrero)	Best two-out-of-three falls six-man tag team match
5	Místico and Volador Jr. won the tag team match that also included El Felino and La Sombra	Relevos Suicida Tag Team match
6	La Sombra defeated El Felino	Best two-out-of-three falls Lucha de Apuestas mask vs. mask match.
