= CMLL Universal Championship (2010) =

Mexican professional wrestling tournament

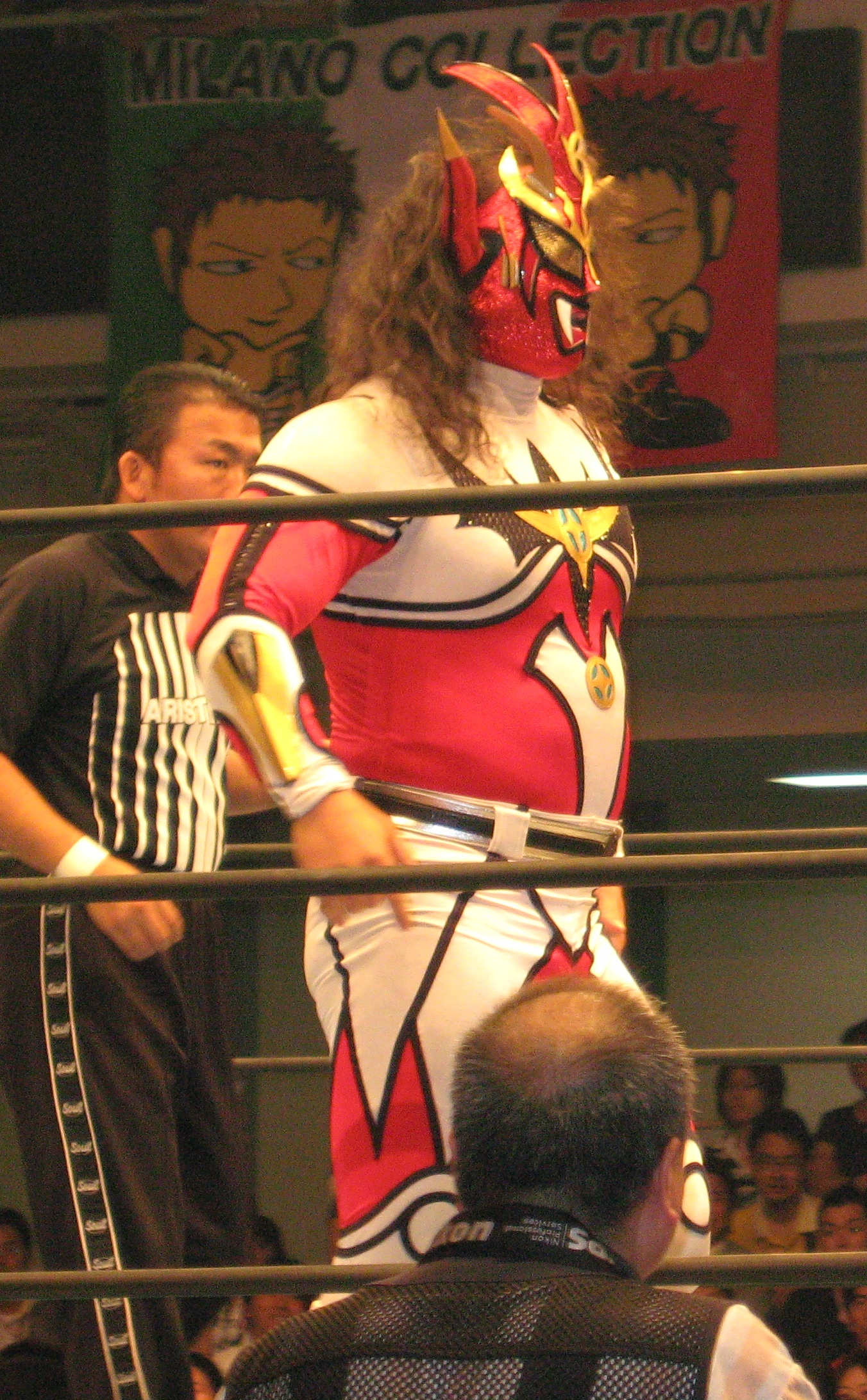
- The 2010 Universal Champion Jushin Thunder Liger
- Promotion: Consejo Mundial de Lucha Libre (CMLL)
- Date: July 30, 2010; August 6, 2010; August 13, 2010
- City: Mexico City, Mexico
- Venue: Arena México

Event chronology
← Previous; Infierno en el Ring	Next → Torneo Bicentenario de Mini-Estrellas

CMLL Universal Championship tournaments chronology
← Previous; 2009	Next → 2011

The CMLL Universal Championship 2010 (Campeonato Universal in Spanish) was a professional wrestling annual tournament produced by Consejo Mundial de Lucha Libre (CMLL) took take place over three CMLL Super Viernes shows between July 30, 2010 and August 13, 2010 in Arena México, Mexico City, Mexico. The CMLL Universal Championship is an annual tournament of CMLL Champions that was first held in 2009. All officially recognized male CMLL Champions participated in a 16-man tournament. In the finals CMLL World Middleweight Champion Jushin Thunder Liger defeated CMLL World Trios Champion La Sombra to win the tournament.

== Background ==
The tournament featured 15 professional wrestling matches under elimination rules, which means that wrestlers were eliminated when they lose a match. There were no specific storylines that build to the tournament, rather is an annual tournament held by CMLL since 2009, replacing their Leyenda de Plata tournament. All male "non-regional" CMLL Champions at the time of the tournament were involved in the tournament with the exception of the reigning CMLL World Mini-Estrella and Mexican National Lightweight Champions. Regionally promoted championships such as the CMLL Arena Coliseo Tag Team Championship and the Occidente championships promoted in Guadalajara, Jalisco were not included in the tournament, only titles that have been defended in CMLL's main venue Arena Mexico were included. The tournament was divided into two qualifying blocks, which took take place on the July 30, 2010 Super Viernes and the August 6, 2010 Super Viernes while the final took place on the August 13, 2010 Super Viernes.

== 2010 Universal Championship tournament ==
When CMLL announced the 2010 tournament the following champions were eligible to participate:

Participant	Championship held
Mr. Águila	CMLL World Tag Team Championship
Averno	NWA World Middleweight Championship
Negro Casas	CMLL World Welterweight Championship
Ephesto	CMLL World Light Heavyweight Championship
Héctor Garza	CMLL World Tag Team Championship
Jushin Thunder Liger	CMLL World Middleweight Championship
La Máscara	CMLL World Trios Championship
Máscara Dorada	CMLL World Super Lightweight Championship; CMLL World Trios Championship; Mexican National Trios Championship
Mephisto	NWA World Welterweight Championship
Metro	Mexican National Trios Championship
La Sombra	CMLL World Trios Championship
Stuka Jr.	Mexican National Trios Championship
El Texano Jr.	NWA World Light Heavyweight Championship
Último Guerrero	CMLL World Heavyweight Championship; CMLL Universal Championship
Valiente	Mexican National Welterweight Championship
Volador Jr.	Mexican National Light Heavyweight Championship

Block A

Block A took place on the July 30, 2010 Super Viernes, featuring eight champions wrestling for a place in the final.

Quarterfinals
Máscara Dorada	Winner
Stuka Jr.
Último Guerrero	Winer
Averno
La Sombra	Winner
Mephisto
El Texano Jr.	Winner
Ephesto

Semifinals
Mascara Dorada
Último Guerrero	Winner
La Sombra	Winner
El Texano Jr.

Finals
Último Guerrero
La Sombra	Winner

Block B

Block B took place on the August 6, 2010 Super Viernes, featuring eight champions wrestling for a place in the final.

Quarterfinals
Héctor Garza	Winner
Metro
Negro Casas
Jushin Thunder Liger	Winner
Volador Jr.	Winner
Valiente
La Máscara	Winner
Mr. Águila

Semifinals
Héctor Garza
Jushin Thunder Liger	Winner
Volador Jr.
La Máscara	Winner

Finals
Jushin Thunder Liger	Winner
La Mascara

Finals

The finals of the tournament took place on the August 13, 2010 Super Viernes and saw Jushin Thunder Liger defeat La Sombra two falls to one, after interference from Liger's cornerman Okumura.
