= List of CMLL Super Viernes shows in 2009 =

List of Super Viernes professional wrestling shows in 2009

2009
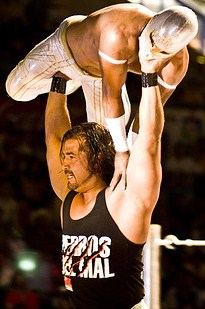
- Místico (Masked) and Héctor Garza, both wrestled on 31 Super Viernes shows in 2009

CMLL Super Viernes shows chronology
← Previous; 2008	Next → 2010

CMLL Super Viernes is professional wrestling promotion Consejo Mundial de Lucha Libre's (CMLL) Friday night wrestling show that takes place in Arena México every Friday night unless a Pay-Per-View or a major wrestling event is scheduled to take place on that night. CMLL began holding their weekly Friday night "Super Viernes" shows as far back as 1938, with 2010 continuing the trend. Some of the matches from Super Viernes are taped for CMLL's weekly shows that air in Mexico the week following the Super Viernes show. CMLL presented 46 Super Viernes shows during 2009, originally scheduled to be 48 but the Swine Influenza epidemic of 2009 forced the cancellation of two shows, one in April and one in May. During the year Super Viernes was replaced by the 2009 Homenaje a Dos Leyendas, Infierno en el Ring, CMLL 76th Anniversary Show and Sin Salida.

Super Viernes hosted both the first ever Campeon Universal tournament and the 2009 version of the Torneo Gran Alternativa. 2009 saw Super Viernes host eight championship matches in total, with only two title changes. The two title changes both occurred in January, 2009 as the CMLL World Tag Team Championship and the Mexican National Women's Championship changed hands.

The shows featured 298 matches in total, 259 for the male division, 20 featuring the female division and 19 featuring the Mini-Estrellas. In 2009 129 different wrestlers appeared in matches during CMLL's Super Viernes shows. Of those 129 wrestlers 14 were Mini-Estrellas and 16 were women. Héctor Garza and Místico wrestled on 31 shows in total, the most of any individual wrestler, which meant they appeared on 67,3% of all the shows. La Amapola was the woman most often featured on Super Viernes with 13 matches, appearing in 65% of the women's matches booked for Super Viernes. Mascarita Dorada was the Mini-Estrella who had the most appearances, wrestling 12 times in total, or in 63,1% of all Mini-Estrella matches. Astral, Pequeno Ninja, Mima Shimoda, Rosa Negra, Star Fire. As Jr., Bronco, Cholo, Nitro, Police Man, Rene Guajardo Jr. and Camaleon all wrestled only on one Super Viernes during 2009. (Note: The statistics are supported by the source for each show.)

== Super Viernes shows of 2009 ==
#	Date	Main Event	Ref(s).
1	January 1	La Sombra, Shocker and Volador Jr. defeated Black Warrior, El Terrible and El Texano Jr.	
2	January 8	La Sombra, Místico and Volador Jr. defeated Los Hijos del Averno (Averno, Ephesto and Mephisto)	
3	January 15	La Sombra and Volador Jr. defeated Los Hijos del Averno (Averno and Mephisto) (c)	
4	January 22	La Sombra, Místico and Volador Jr. defeated La Peste Negra (Heavy Metal, Mr. Niebla and Negro Casas)	
5	January 29	Atlantis, Mr. Niebla and Negro Casas defeated La Sombra, Místico and Volador Jr.	
6	February 5	Atlantis, Heavy Metal and Negro Casas defeated La Sombra, Místico and Volador Jr.	
7	February 12	La Sombra and Volador Jr. (C) defeated La Peste Negra (Heavy Metal and Negro Casas)	
8	February 19	Atlantis, Mr. Niebla and Rey Bucanero defeated Héctor Garza, Marco Corleone and Místico	
9	February 26	Atlantis, Negro Casas and Rey Bucanero defeated Héctor Garza, Marco Corleone and Místico	
10	March 5	Dos Caras Jr., Héctor Garza and Shocker defeated Black Warrior and La Peste Negra (Mr. Niebla and Negro Casas)	
11	March 12	La Peste Negra (Heavy Metal, Mr. Niebla and Negro Casas) defeated Dos Caras Jr., Místico and Shocker	
–	March 19	Event replaced with Homenaje a Dos Leyendas	
12	March 26	El Texano Jr., Ray Mendoza Jr. and Villano IV defeated Los Guerreros de la Atlantida (Atlantis, Rey Bucanero and Último Guerrero)	
13	April 2	Los Hijos del Averno (Averno, El Terrible and El Texano Jr.) defeated Blue Panther, Dos Caras Jr. and Shocker	
14	April 9	Los Hijos del Averno (Averno, El Terrible and Mephisto) defeated Dos Caras Jr., Héctor Garza and La Máscara	
15	April 16	El Terrible, Dos Caras Jr. and El Texano Jr. defeated Héctor Garza, Místico and Shocker	
–	April 23	Cancelled due to the Swine Influensa epidemic of 2009	
–	April 30	Cancelled due to the Swine Influensa epidemic of 2009	
–	May 2	Cancelled due to the Swine Influensa epidemic of 2009	
16	May 8	Blue Panther, La Máscara and Místico defeated La Peste Negra (El Felino, Mr. Niebla and Negro Casas)	
17	May 15	Blue Panther, Místico and Shocker defeated Averno, Dos Caras Jr. and Mephisto	
18	May 22	Dos Caras Jr., Negro Casas and Último Guerrero defeated Héctor Garza, Místico and Shocker	
19	May 29	Averno (c) defeated Blue Panther	
20	June 5	Héctor Garza, Shocker and Volador Jr. defeated Dos Caras Jr. and No Limit (Naito and Yujiro)	
21	June 12	Shocker defeated Dos Caras Jr.	
22	June 19	Último Guerrero defeated El Texano Jr.	
23	June 26	La Sombra, Místico and Volador Jr. defeated La Peste Negra (El Felino, Mr. Niebla and Negro Casas)	
24	July 3	La Sombra, Místico and Volador Jr. defeated Los Hijos del Averno (Averno, Ephesto and Mephisto)	
25	July 10	Místico, Shocker and Volador Jr. defeated Mr. Niebla, Negro Casas and Último Guerrero	
26	July 17	Héctor Garza, Místico and Shocker defeated Los Hijos del Averno (Averno, El Terrible and El Texano Jr.)	
27	July 24	El Texano Jr. (C) defeated Shocker	
–	July 31	Event replaced with Infierno en el Ring (2009)	
28	August 7	La Peste Negra (El Felino, Mr. Niebla and Negro Casas) defeated Héctor Garza, Místico and Shocker	
29	August 14	Atlantis, Mr. Niebla and Último Guerrero defeated Héctor Garza, Shocker and Toscano	
30	August 21	Blue Panther, La Sombra and Místico defeated La Peste Negra (El Felino, Heavy Metal and Negro Casas)	
31	August 28	La Sombra, Místico and Volador Jr. defeated Atlantis, El Felino and Mr. Niebla	
32	September 4	La Sombra, Shocker and Volador Jr. defeated Los Hijos del Averno (El Terrible, El Texano Jr. and Ephesto)	
33	September 11	La Ola Amarilla (Jushin Thunder Liger, Naito and Yujiro) defeated Los Guerreros de la Atlantida (Atlantis and Último Guerrero) and Black Warrior	
–	September 18	Event replaced with the CMLL 76th Anniversary Show	
34	September 25	Último Guerrero (c) defeated Jushin Thunder Liger	
35	October 2	Black Warrior, Místico and Último Guerrero defeated La Ola Amarilla (Naito, Yujiro and Okumura)	
36	October 9	Black Warrior, Jon Strongman and Shocker defeated La Ola Amarilla (Naito, Yujiro and Okumura)	
37	October 16	Yujiro defeated Black Warrior	
38	October 23	Jon Strongman, Místico and Shocker defeated Los Guerreros de Atlantida (Atlantis and Último Guerrero) and Negro Casas	
39	October 30	Brazo de Plata, Héctor Garza and Shocker defeated No Limit (Naito and Yujiro) and Ray Mendoza Jr.	
40	November 6	Los Guerreros de la Atlantida (Atlantis and Último Guerrero) and Negro Casas defeated Brazo de Plata, La Sombra and Shocker	
41	November 13	Héctor Garza, Jon Strongman and Místico defeated Los Guerreros de la Atlantida (Atlantis and Último Guerrero) and Negro Casas	
42	November 20	Jon Strongman, Místico and Shocker defeated Averno and La Peste Negra (El Felino and Negro Casas)	
43	November 27	Los Guerreros de la Atlantida (Atlantis and Último Guerrero) and Mr. Niebla defeated Héctor Garza, Jon Strongman and Shocker	
44	December 5	Event replaced with Sin Salida	
45	December 11	Héctor Garza, Jon Strongman and Volador Jr. defeated Los Hijos del Averno (Averno, Ephesto and Mephisto)	
46	December 18	La Sombra, Místico and Volador Jr. defeated Los Hijos del Averno (El Terrible, El Texano Jr. and Mephisto)	
47	December 25	Brazo de Plata, Místico and Volador Jr. defeated Los Guerreros de la Atlantida (Atlantis, Rey Bucanero and Último Guerrero)	
