= CMLL Super Viernes (August 2010) =

Mexican Professional wrestling show summary

In August 2010, the Mexican professional wrestling promotion Consejo Mundial de Lucha Libre (CMLL) will hold a total of four CMLL Super Viernes shows, all of which will take place Arena México on Friday nights. CMLL does not currently have plans to hold any special events on Fridays that would force a cancellation such as a pay-per-view (PPV). Some of the matches from Super Viernes are taped for CMLL's weekly shows that air in Mexico the week following the Super Viernes show. Super Viernes often features storyline feud between two wrestlers or group of wrestlers that develop from week to week, often coming to a conclusion at a major CMLL event or in a match on Friday nights between the individuals.

== August 6, 2010 ==
CMLL Super Viernes
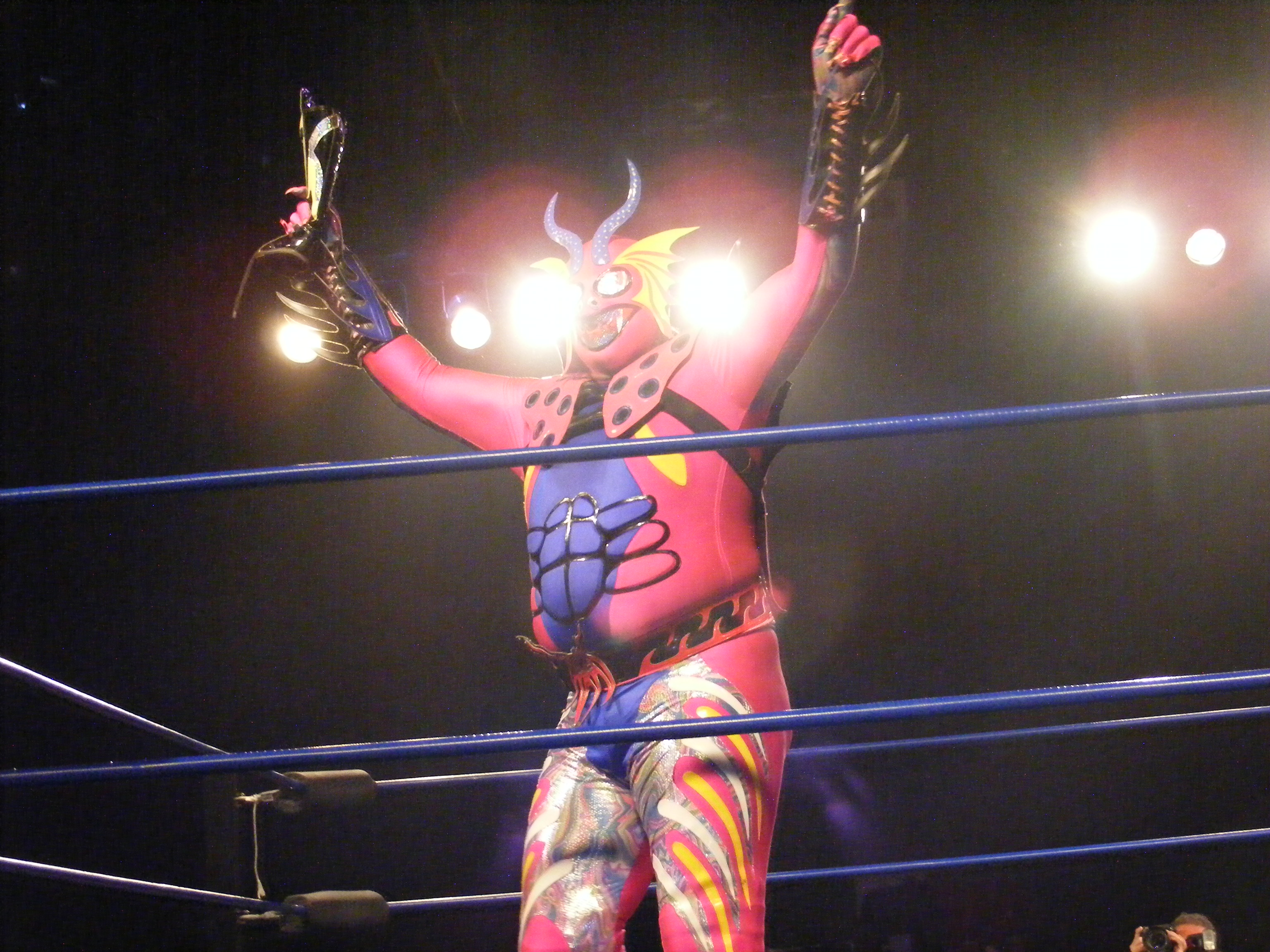
- Invasor El Alebrije
- Promotion: Consejo Mundial de Lucha Libre (CMLL)
- Date: August 6, 2010
- City: Mexico City, Mexico
- Venue: Arena México

CMLL Super Viernes chronology
← Previous; Super Viernes July 30, 2010	Next → Super Viernes August 13, 2010

The August 6, 2010 Super Viernes was a professional wrestling event held by Consejo Mundial de Lucha Libre (CMLL) in their home arena Arena Mexico. The show hosted the second block of the 2010 Universal Championship tournament, with seven tournament matches.the following champions were involved in Block B on Jushin Thunder Liger, Negro Casas, Héctor Garza, Mr. Águila, La Mascara, Volador Jr., Valiente, Metro.

No.	Results	Stipulations	Times
1	Starman and Bengala defeated Los Hombre del Camoflaje (Súper Comando and Artillero)	Best two out of three falls Tag team match	11:48
2	Eléctrico, Fantasy and Tzuki defeated Pequeño Nitro Pequeño Violencia and Pequeño Universo 2000	Six-man tag team match	11:09
3	Blue Panther, Sagrado and Toscano defeated El Felino, Okumura and Vangelis	Six-man tag team match	14:42
4	Mr. Águila and La Máscara defeated Metro, Héctor Garza, Jushin Thunder Liger, Negro Casas, Volador Jr. and Valiente	2010 Universal Championship Block A seeding Battle Royal	—
5	Héctor Garza defeated Metro	CMLL Universal Championship round one match	03:58
6	Jushin Thunder Liger defeated Negro Casas	CMLL Universal Championship round one match	04:41
7	Volador Jr. defeated Valiente	CMLL Universal Championship round one match	02:27
8	La Máscara defeated Mr. Águila	CMLL Universal Championship round one match	04:02
9	Jushin Thunder Liger defeated Héctor Garza	CMLL Universal Championship quarterfinal match	02:42
10	La Máscara defeated Volador Jr. by disqualifaction	CMLL Universal Championship quarterfinal match	03:53
11	Jushin Thunder Liger defeated La Máscara	CMLL Universal Championship semifinal match	04:21
12	Místico, Shocker and La Sombra defeated Los Invasores (El Alebrije, Olímpico and Psicosis)	Six-man tag team match	07:25

== August 13, 2010 ==
CMLL Super Viernes
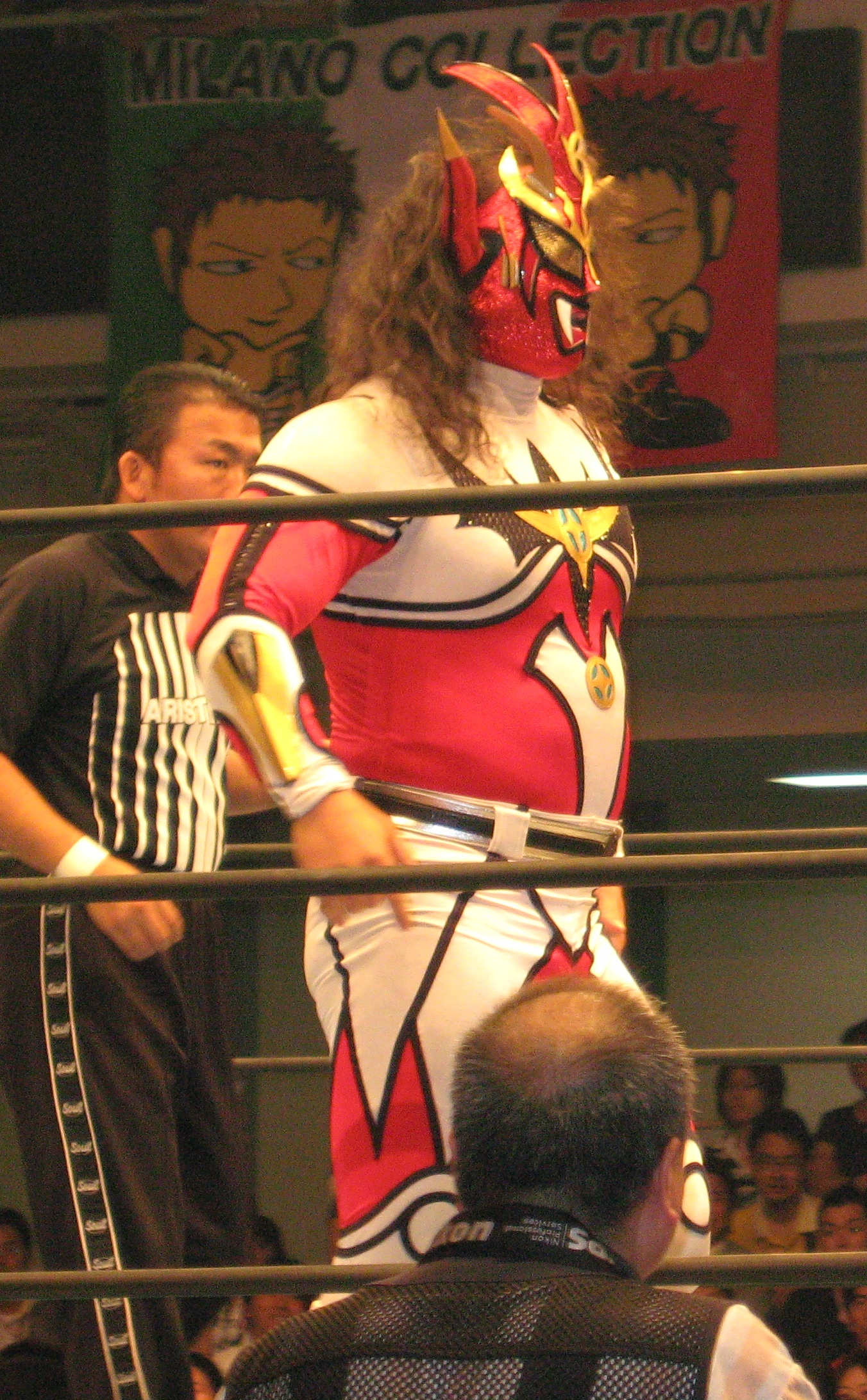
- the 2010 Universal Champion Jushin Thunder Liger
- Promotion: Consejo Mundial de Lucha Libre (CMLL)
- Date: August 13, 2010
- City: Mexico City, Mexico
- Venue: Arena México

CMLL Super Viernes chronology
← Previous; Super Viernes August 6, 2010	Next → Super Viernes August 20, 2010

The August 13, 2010 Super Viernes was a professional wrestling event held by Consejo Mundial de Lucha Libre (CMLL) in their home arena Arena Mexico. the show hosted the finals of the 2010 Universal Championship tournament which saw Jushin Thunder Liger defeated La Sombra to win the tournament.

No.	Results	Stipulations	Times
1	Sensei and Molotov defeated Disturbio and Durango Kid	Best two out of three falls Tag team match	12:12
2	Demus 3:16, Pierrothito and Pequeño Black Warrior defeated Mascarita Dorada, Ultimo Dragoncito and Astral	Six-man tag team match	13:27
3	Los Invasores (Héctor Garza, Mr. Águila and Charly Manson) defeated La Peste Negra (El Felino, Negro Casas and Rey Bucanero)	Six-man tag team match	14:12
4	Mr. Niebla, Volador Jr. and Dragón Rojo Jr. defeated Los Hijos del Averno (Averno, Mephisto and Ephesto)	Four team Trios tournament match	04:00
5	Místico, Máscara Dorada and La Máscara defeated Los Guerreros de la Atlantida (Último Guerrero, Atlantis and Olímpico) by disqualification	Four team Trios tournament match	03:26
6	Mr. Niebla, Volador Jr. and Dragón Rojo, Jr. defeated Místico, Mascara Dorada and La Máscara	Four team Trios tournament match	06:26
7	Jushin Thunder Liger defeated La Sombra	2010 Universal Championship tournament final	17:48
