= CMLL Super Viernes (July 2010) =

Mexican Professional wrestling show summary

In July 2010, the Mexican professional wrestling promotion Consejo Mundial de Lucha Libre (CMLL) held a total of five CMLL Super Viernes shows, all of which will take place Arena México on Friday nights. CMLL will not hold any special events on Fridays that would force a cancellation such as a pay-per-view (PPV). Some of the matches from Super Viernes are taped for CMLL's weekly shows that air in Mexico the week following the Super Viernes show. Super Viernes often features storyline feud between two wrestlers or group of wrestlers that develop from week to week, often coming to a conclusion at a major CMLL event or in a match on Friday nights between the individuals. SuperViernes featurede 36 matches in total, due to the July 30 event featuring 12 matches in total, including one Mini-Estrella and four matches from CMLL's women's division. Místico and La Sombra were the only wrestlers to work on four out of the five Super Viernes shows.

Part of July was spent focusing on the storylines that lead up to a 12-man steel cage match that took place on July 18, 2010 at CMLL's 2010 Infierno en el Ring event. The particular focus was on the feud between Fabián el Gitano and Doctor X as well as the developing tension between Los Ángeles Celestiales (Ángel de Oro and Ángel de Plata) and Los Gatos Negros (Tiger Kid and Puma King). Another feud that led up to the event, but did not culminate with the Infierno en el Ring match was the developing feud between Ángel Azteca, Jr. and Arkangel de la Muerte, playing off the fact that Arkangel was the wrestler that unmasked Ángel Azteca. July was also the month where the Los Invasores group really showed up on Super Viernes, including the co-leaders Mr. Águila and Héctor Garza winning the CMLL World Tag Team Championship from Volador Jr. and La Sombra. Another feud that began in July was between CMLL loyal Místico and Invasor Psicosis II, a feud that started on July 16, 2010 and featured on all subsequent Super Viernes shows in July. The July 30, 2010 hosted the first round of the 2010 CMLL Universal Championship tournament which La Sombra won to qualify for the finals on August 13, 2010.

== July 2, 2010 ==
CMLL Super Viernes
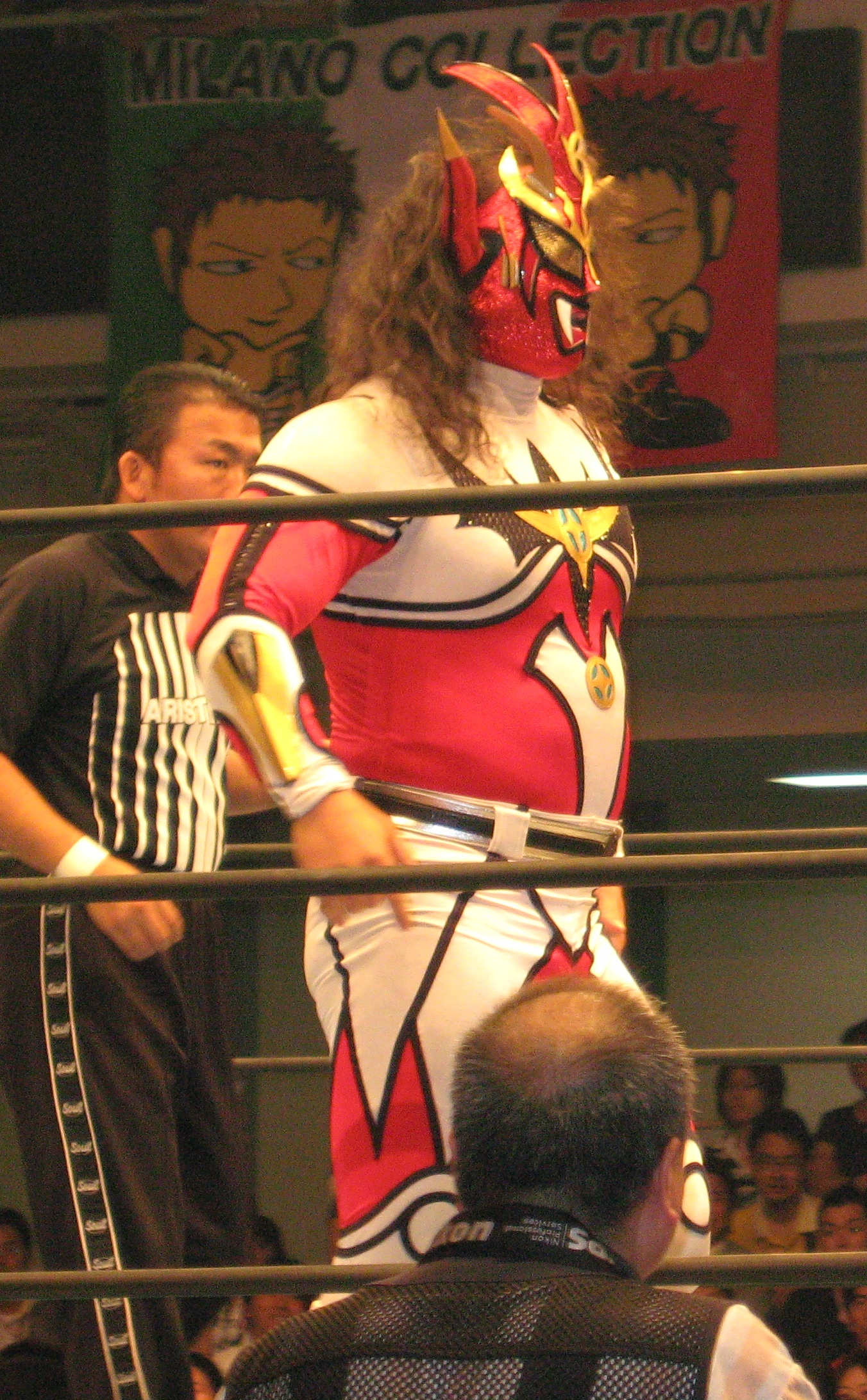
- Jushin Thunder Liger, part of La Ola Amarilla in the fifth match
- Promotion: Consejo Mundial de Lucha Libre (CMLL)
- Date: July 2, 2010
- City: Mexico City, Mexico
- Venue: Arena México

CMLL Super Viernes chronology
| ← Previous; Super Viernes June 25, 2010 | Next → Super Viernes July 9, 2010 |

The July 2 Super Viernes featured the traditional format of six matches including a Lighting match and an opening tag team match and four Best two out of three falls Six-man tag team matches. The main event was a re-match from the previous week's Super Viernes as La Peste Negra (Negro Casas, El Felino and Mr. Niebla) wrestled against Místico, La Sombra and Shocker. Místico and La Sombra came out wearing combined outfits and masks, putting their recent tension behind them. The previous week Mr. Niebla had faked a foul from La Sombra to earn the victory, this week Mr. Niebla and La Sombra picked up their rivalry where they left off the previous week. Niebla pinned La Sombra and El Felino forced Místico to submit to win the first fall. During the second fall the tecnico (good guy) team finally gained the advantage as Místico pinned El Felino and Shocker forced Negro Casas to submit after 4:50 seconds of wrestling. The last fall lasted just over six minutes, making the main event the longest match of the night at 16:11 and ended when Mr. Niebla intentionally yanked La Sombra's mask off in plain view of the referee to earn a disqualification loss. After the match Mr. Niebla celebrated with La Sombra's mask in his hands as a trophy of his cheating actions.

In the semi-main event New Japan Pro-Wrestling's Jushin Thunder Liger teamed up with La Ola Amarilla ("The Yellow Wave") team of Okumura and Nobuo Yoshihashi for the first time during his tour of Mexico. The Japanese trio's opponents were cousins La Máscara and Máximo teaming up with Toscano to represent Mexico. Liger won the first fall when he pinned La Máscara in just over 5 minutes. 3:19 later La Máscara evened the score when he forced Liger to submit to his Campana submission hold. In the final fall the long running feud between Máximo and Okumura took center stage as Máximo tried to get revenge from a hair vs. hair match loss from 2009. The Mexican team took the victory when Máximo pinned Okumura following a Powerbomb and Toscano pinned Yoshihashi to make it 2-1 in their advantage.

The fourth match of the night featured CMLL's women's division as CMLL World Women's Champion La Amapola teamed up with Las Zorras (PWR Women's Champion Princesa Sujei and Mexican National Women's Champion Princesa Blanca) to face three of CMLL's most experienced women in Lady Apache, Marcela and Luna Mágica. The championship team was too much for Lady Apache and her team as the rudas (villains) team defeated Lady Apache, Marcela and Luna Mágica in two straight falls.

Fuego, together with Stuka, Jr. were the current CMLL Arena Coliseo Tag Team Champions with members of Los Cancerberos del Infierno trying to earn a title match for some time. In the lightning match Fuego faced Los Cancerberos member Cancerbero, in a match with a one fall, 10 minute time limit. Fuego only needed 6 minutes and 26 seconds to defeat the experienced rudo, forcing him to submit to a Muta Lock.

The second match of the night continued the series of mid-card feuds that all centered around Lucha de Apuesta, mask vs. mask challenges that would later on lead to a 12-man cage match at Infierno en el Ring. Fabián el Gitano's feud with Doctor X continued this week with Dr. X's Guerreros Tuareg partner Arkangel de la Muerte played the antagonist role as he teamed up with Los Gatos Negros (Puma King and Tiger Kid) for the second week in a row. Los Gatos Negros focused on Fabián's partner Sensei, tearing his mask open during the match. In the end Fabián, Sensei and Molotov won the match in two falls when Arkangel and Los Gatos were disqualified for pulling the mask off Sensei.

In the opening match veteran Luchador tecnico Tigre Blanco teamed up with Metálico to take on the rudo team of Disturbio and Semental who have teamed up several times through 2010. After 10:53 of wrestling the tecnico team won two falls to one.

| No. | Results | Stipulations | Times |
|---|---|---|---|
| 1 | Tigre Blanco and Metálico defeated Disturbio and Semental | Best two out of three falls Tag team match | 10:53 |
| 2 | Fabián el Gitano, Sensei and Molotov defeated Arkangel de la Muerte and Los Gatos Negro (Puma King and Tiger Kid) | Six-man tag team match | 11:59 |
| 3 | Fuego defeated Cancerbero | Lightning match (One fall, 10 minute time-limit match) | 06:26 |
| 4 | La Amapola and Las Zorras (Princesa Sujei and Princesa Blanca) defeated Lady Apache, Marcela and Luna Mágica | Six-man tag team match | 11:27 |
| 5 | La Máscara, Toscano and Máximo defeated La Ola Amarilla (Jushin Thunder Liger, Okumura and Nobuo Yoshihashi) | Six-man tag team match | 12:59 |
| 6 | Místico, Shocker and La Sombra defeated La Peste Negra (Mr. Niebla, Negro Casas and El Felino) | Six-man tag team match | 16:11 |

== July 9, 2010 ==
CMLL Super Viernes
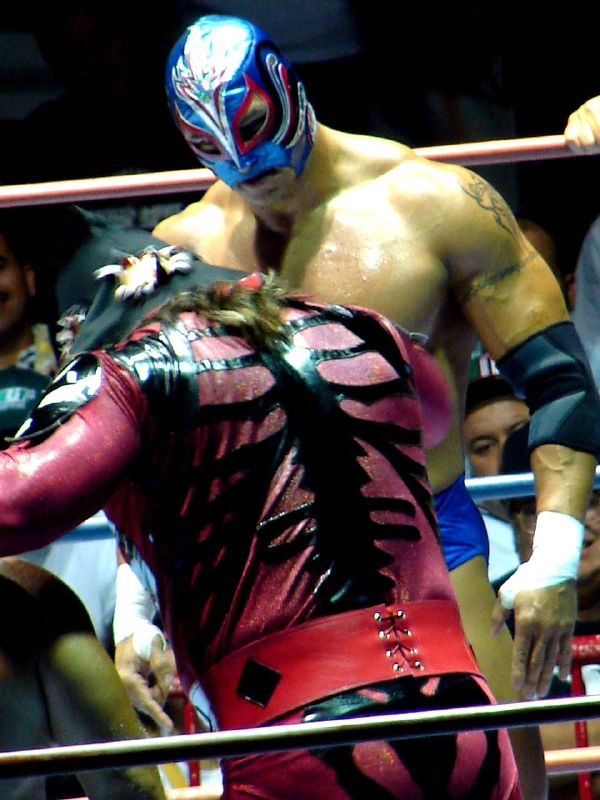
- Olímpico, one of Los Invasores
- Promotion: Consejo Mundial de Lucha Libre (CMLL)
- Date: July 9, 2010
- City: Mexico City, Mexico
- Venue: Arena México

CMLL Super Viernes chronology
| ← Previous; Super Viernes July 2, 2010 | Next → Super Viernes July 16, 2010 |

Mexico City suffered heavy rain-fall and some flooding in the aftermath of Hurricane Alex which affected the attendance for CMLL's Friday night show, estimated to be under 50% full. The July 9, 2010, Super Viernes saw former Perros del Mal members Mr. Águila and Héctor Garza team up for the first time since January 2008 in the main event of the show. With the addition of Olímpico to their side, the match also marked the first time Los Invasores (a group of former Asistencia Asesoría y Administración wrestlers) appeared on CMLL's Super Viernes show. Their opponents were the CMLL World Tag Team Champions Volador Jr. and La Sombra, teaming up with La Máscara. In early June, 2010 Volador Jr. had turned rudo (bad guy) and the tag team champions had not teamed up since then, leaving their status as a unit in question. Los Invasores dominated the first fall, cheating at every opportunity to keep the Tag Team champions under control. Olímpico scored the first pin-fall, pinning Volador Jr. after a Plancha. the tecnico (good guy) team took control of the second fall with their high-flying moves and superior speed, with La Máscara forcing Olímpico to submit to his La Campana Pendulum submission hold, tying the score one to one. In the third fall, the tecnico team kept relying on their high-flying moves, which ultimately resulted in their downfall as Mr. Águila caught La Sombra while trying to execute a flying move and Powerbombed him, followed by Garza raising his foot in the air, interrupting Volador Jr.'s Moonsault to gain a double pinfall on the tag team champions to win the match for Los Invasores. After the match, Mr. Águila and Garza laid out a challenge for the CMLL World Tag Team Championship, which Volador Jr. and La Sombra quickly accepted. The title match was announced as the following week's Super Viernes main event.

The semi-main event was a rare rudo vs rudo match as La Peste Negra (Negro Casas, El Felino and Mr. Niebla) wrestled New Japan Pro-Wrestling's (NJPW) Jushin Thunder Liger and Los Hijos del Averno (Averno and Mephstio). CMLL booked the match to further the feud between Negro Casas and Liger which had begun during Negro Casas' tour of Japan in April where he wrestled Liger on several occasions, including losing the CMLL World Middleweight Championship to him. Liger had gotten the better of Casas in Japan and continued to have the upper hand when they clashed in Mexico for the first time as Liger pinned both Negro Casas and El Felino to win the first fall. Mr. Niebla had Liger pinned for the second fall but Liger's teammate Averno distracted the referee, allowing Liger ample time to pull Mr. Niebla's mask off to distract him, followed by a low blow which allowed Liger to pin Mr. Niebla, winning the match for his team in two straight falls.

In the fourth match of the night, Mexican National Welterweight Champion Valiente teamed up with frequent partner El Sagrado and the Exótico Máximo to face La Ola Amarilla ("The Yellow Wave") consisting of Shigeo Okumura and NJPW rookie Nobuo Yoshihashi teaming up with Vangelis on the night. Máximo and Okumura has had a long running rivalry that included Máximo losing his hair to Okumura in 2009, a rivalry that continued on this night with Máximo looking for a hair vs. hair match down the line. On the night Valiente, Sagrado and Máximo turned out to be too much of a challenge as they won the match in 12:27.

That night's Lighting match featured the long-running rivalry between Mascarita Dorada and Pierrothito that has seen the two wrestle against each other in both Mexico and the United States of America and has been going on since 2008. The two being so accustomed to working with one another has reduced a series of high-speed match that the fans respond to and the Lighting match on July 9 was no different as the two worked a very competitive match that looked like it could go to the 10 minute time limit. Mascarita Dorada managed to win the match with just 14 seconds left on the clock as he pinned Pierrotitho at 9:46.

The second match of the evening featured four of the 12 wrestlers scheduled to wrestling in a 12-man Infierno en el Ring cage match on July 18, 2010, as Diamante and Sensei teamed up with Molotov (not in the match) to take on Sensei's main rivals Los Gatos Negros (Puma King and Tiger Kid) who teamed up with the Durango Kid (also not scheduled for the cage match). Diamante's team won the first fall by pinfall and was subsequently also awarded the second fall as Tiger Kid and Puma King pulled Sensei's mask off during the match.

In the opening match, Horus, grandson of luchador Ángel Blanco, teamed up with Bengala, defeating the brother duo known as Los Hombres del Camoflaje ("The Camouflage Men"), Súper Comando and Artillero. The opening match also was the longest match of the night as Horus and Bengala won the match in 13:55, 46 seconds longer than the second longest match.

| No. | Results | Stipulations | Times |
|---|---|---|---|
| 1 | Horus and Bengala defeated a Los Hombres del Camoflaje (Súper Comando and Artillero) | Best two out of three falls Tag team match | 13:55 |
| 2 | Molotov, Sensei and Diamante defeated Los Gatos Negro (Tiger Kid and Puma King) and Durango Kid | Six-man tag team match | 13:09 |
| 3 | Mascarita Dorada defeated Pierrothito | Lightning match (One fall, 10 minute time-limit match) | 09:45 |
| 4 | El Sagrado, Valiente and Máximo defeated La Ola Amarilla (Shigeo Okumura and Nobuo Yoshihashi) and Vangelis | Six-man tag team match | 12:27 |
| 5 | Jushin Thunder Liger and Los Hijos del Averno (Averno and Mephisto) defeated La Peste Negra (Mr. Niebla, El Felino and Negro Casas) | Six-man tag team match | 19:22 |
| 6 | Los Invasores (Héctor Garza, Mr. Águila and Olímpico) defeated Volador Jr., La Sombra and La Máscara | Six-man tag team match | 14:25 |

== July 16, 2010 ==
CMLL Super Viernes
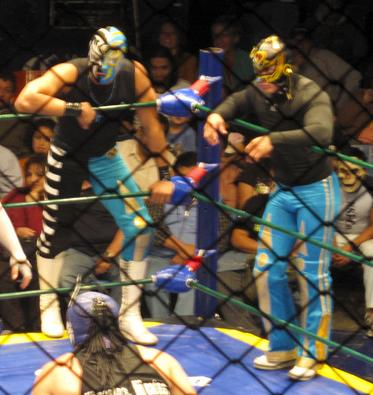
- La Sombra (left) and Volador Jr. (right) defending the CMLL World Tag Team Championship in the main event
- Promotion: Consejo Mundial de Lucha Libre (CMLL)
- Date: July 16, 2010
- City: Mexico City, Mexico
- Venue: Arena México

CMLL Super Viernes chronology
| ← Previous; Super Viernes July 9, 2010 | Next → Super Viernes July 23, 2010 |

The July 16, 2010 Super Viernes was a weekly professional wrestling event held by Consejo Mundial de Lucha Libre (CMLL) in their home arena Arena Mexico. The main event was a CMLL World Tag Team Championship match with Volador Jr. and La SOmbra defending against Héctor Garza and Mr. Águila, the co-leaders of Los Invasores. The match came about after Garza and Mr. Águila winning a trios match against Volador Jr. and La Sombra (and La Máscara) at the previous week's Super Viernes main event. Los Invasores took the first fall in quick fashion, pinning both of their opponents only 2:15 after the opening bell. Just as it looked like the champions would lose in two quick falls they turned the tables on their opponents when Volador Jr. powerbombed Garza and La Sombra applied a (Double knee backbreaker on Mr. Águila to take the second fall. During the third fall the biased refereeing of El Tirantes came into play repeatedly. At one point El Tirantes counted so slowly that what was supposed to take three seconds took over six seconds before Garza kicked out. When Volador Jr. complained to El Tirantes over the biased refereeing Garza took advantage of the distraction, knocking volador Jr. down with a Superkick and when he went to pin Volador Jr. El Tirantes counted what was described as a "supersonic" fast three count. After Garza and Mr. Águila were handed the belts Volador Jr. and La Sombra attacked El Tirantes for the biased refereeing during the match. With the victory Héctor Garza and Mr. Águila became the 30th CMLL World Tag Team Champions.

The semi-final match seemed to be the starting point of a new rivalry between CMLL's top tecnico (fan favorite) and Los Invasor representative Psicosis II as they faced off in a Best two out of three falls Six-man tag team match. In addition to the developing rivalry between Místico and Psicosis, it also continued the feud between Rayo de Jalisco, Jr., who teamed up with Místico, and Universo 2000 who sided with Psicosis. The trios were rounded out by Blue Panther on the tecnico side and New Japan Pro-Wrestling (NJPW) representative Jushin Thunder Liger joining the rudo team. Místico came out holding El Oriental's mask which he had won on Monday Night during the Promociones Gutiérrez 1st Anniversary Show, something which Psicosis, El Oriental's teammate, did not appreciate and the match quickly degenerated into a brawl between the two, with both trying to tear the mask off the other's head. While the two fought at ringside the rudo team won the first fall when Liger pinned Blue Panther and then joined up with Universo 2000 to pin Rayo de Jalisco, Jr. after a double suplex 9:16 into the match. With Místico and Psicosis focusing on each other the remaining four wrestlers carried the action in the second fall with Panther forcing Liger to submit, followed by Rayo de Jalisco, Jr. pinning Universo 2000 following a Topé en Reversa, taking the second fall for their team. In the third fall Místico and Psicosis took the spotlight with a long exchange of holds and moves with neither gaining the advantage. In the end Místico frustrated Psicosis to the extent that he landed a low blow on Místico in clear view of the referee, earning a disqualification for his team, leaving Místico, Rayo de Jalisco, Jr. and Blue Panther the victors in the longest match of the night at 22:45.

In the fourth match of the evening two-thirds of the current CMLL World Trios Champions, La Máscara and Máscara Dorada teamed up with former Trios champion El Hijo del Fantasma against the team known as Los Hijos del Averno ("The Sons of Hell"; Averno, Ephesto and Mephisto). Los Hijos proved that they had the better teamwork as they took the first fall after Averno drilled Hijo del Fantasma with his Devil Wings finishing move, a Spinning sitout double underhook facebuster. The second fall came when La Máscara forced Averno to submit when he applied La Campana ("The bell", a Pendulum submission hold). The third and deciding fall lasted only 4:44 and ended when Los Hijos used a triple powerbomb on La Máscara and then pinned him.

The Lightning match was originally scheduled to feature Marcela, but on the night Dark Angel wrestled against La Amapola without any explanation of why the replacement was made. The match was the definition of a lighting match as it lasted only 3:53, where La Amapola countered Dark Angel's La Reienera hold into a backcraker for the pinfall.

Diamante was the only wrestler out of the 12 wrestlers putting their masks on the line at the 2010 Infierno en el Ring cage match to appear on the Super Viernes three days before the event. Diamante teamed up with Pegasso and Rey Cometa to wrestle against Los Guerreros Tuareg (Arkangel de la Muerte and (Loco Max and Skándalo). Arkangel was a large part of the build to the Infierno en el Ring match, but was not included in the 12 men, although he continued to play the antagonist on behalf of his teammates Doctor X and Hooligan who are in the match. Diamante, Pegasso and Rey Cometa won the match in two straight falls, taking the second match by disqualification when Arkangel unmasked Diamante in full view of the referee.

In the opening match the rookie Metálico teamed up with seasoned wrestler Trueno to Camorra and Semental in a tag team match after 10:47 of wrestling, the shortest match of the night except for the lighting match.

| No. | Results | Stipulations | Times |
|---|---|---|---|
| 1 | Metálico and Trueno defeated Camorra and Semental | Best two out of three falls Tag team match | 10:47 |
| 2 | Diamante, Pegasso and Rey Cometa defeated Los Guerreros Tuareg (Arkangel de la Muerte, Loco Max and Skándalo) | Six-man tag team match | 12:23 |
| 3 | La Amapola defeated Dark Angel | Lightning match (One fall, 10 minute time-limit match) | 03:53 |
| 4 | Los Hijos del Averno (Averno, Ephesto and Mephisto) defeated El Hijo del Fantasma, La Máscara and Máscara Dorada | Six-man tag team match | 12:37 |
| 5 | Blue Panther, Místico and Rayo de Jalisco, Jr. defeated Jushin Thunder Liger, Psicosis II and Universo 2000 | Six-man tag team match | 22:45 |
| 6 | Los Invasores (Héctor Garza and Mr. Águila) defeated La Sombra and Volador Jr. (C) | Six-man tag team match for the CMLL World Tag Team Championship | 13:41 |

== July 23, 2010 ==
CMLL Super Viernes
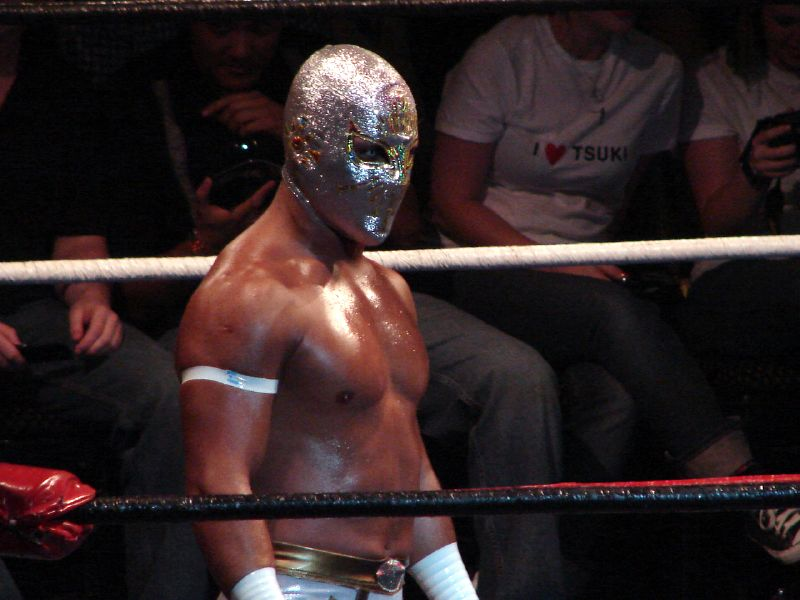
- Místico, one of the participants in the main event
- Promotion: Consejo Mundial de Lucha Libre (CMLL)
- Date: July 23, 2010
- City: Mexico City, Mexico
- Venue: Arena México

CMLL Super Viernes chronology
| ← Previous; Super Viernes July 16, 2010 | Next → Super Viernes July 30, 2010 |

The April 3, 2009 Super Viernes was a weekly professional wrestling event held by Consejo Mundial de Lucha Libre (CMLL) in their home arena Arena Mexico. In the main event of the night rivals Místico and Psicosis II each captained a team of three for a Best two out of three falls Six-man tag team match. While ostentatiously being billed as "CMLL vs. Los Invasores the match up focused more on the rivalry between Místico and Psicosis II than it did on Místico's partners Los Guapos International (Shocker and Jon Strongman) or the newly crowned CMLL World Tag Team Champions Héctor Garza, Mr. Águila. During the match Místico and Psicosis II fought outside the ring, all the way to the 12-foot-tall (3.7 m) video wall that CMLL uses for its shows. At one point Psicosis manages to knock Místico down long enough for him to climb up on the video wall and then leap off it while executing a Diving guillotine leg drop on Místico who was still on the ground. Los Invasores won the first fall by pinning first Strongman, then Shocker after a triple-team move. During the second fall Psicosis II employed the underhanded tactic of pulling his own mask off, then throwing it to Místico to make it appear like Místico had pulled Psicosis II's mask off. The tactic paid off as the referee disqualified Místico for the perceived transgression and awarded the second fall to Los Invasores, giving them the overall victory in two straight falls. After the match an incensed Místico challenged Psicosis II to put his mask on the line in a Lucha de Apuesta match. Psicosis II on his part declined, saying he was not going to take the challenge, instead wanted a one on one match against Místico to "prove that he was better". The agreed upon match was scheduled for the following week.

| No. | Results | Stipulations | Times |
|---|---|---|---|
| 1 | Astro Boy and Metálico defeated Mortiz and Semental | Best two out of three falls Tag team match | 14:04 |
| 2 | La Amapola, Princesa Blanca and Princesa Sujei defeated Dark Angel, Lluvia and Luna Mágica | Six-man tag team match | 09:39 |
| 3 | Ángel de Oro, Diamante and Rush defeated Los Cancerberos del Infierno (Cancerbero, Raziel and Virus) | Six-man tag team match | 15:42 |
| 4 | Marcela defeated Lady Apache | Lightning match (One fall, 10 minute time-limit match) | 05:27 |
| 5 | La Peste Negra (El Felino and Negro Casas) and Rey Bucanero defeated Delta, La Máscara and Blue Panther | Six-man tag team match | 10:16 |
| 6 | Los Invasores (Héctor Garza, Mr. Águila and Psicosis II) defeated Místico and Los Guapos International (Shocker and Jon Strongman) | Six-man tag team match | 18:28 |

== July 30, 2010 ==
CMLL Super Viernes
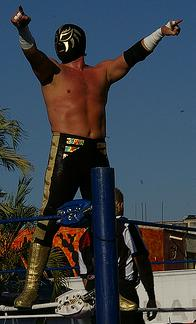
- La Sombra, winner of Block A of the 2010 Universal Championship
- Promotion: Consejo Mundial de Lucha Libre (CMLL)
- Date: July 30, 2010
- City: Mexico City, Mexico
- Venue: Arena México

CMLL Super Viernes chronology
| ← Previous; Super Viernes July 23, 2010 | Next → Super Viernes August 6, 2010 |

The July 30, 2010 Super Viernes was a weekly professional wrestling event held by Consejo Mundial de Lucha Libre (CMLL) in their home arena Arena Mexico. The show broke away from the traditional "6 match" format as it presented 12 matches in total, 8 of which were part of CMLL's 2010 Universal Championship tournament. The main event was a singles match between Místico and Psicosis II, a match that was a direct result of the main event six-man tag team match from the previous week's Super Viernes where the two had been on opposing sides of the match. The match between CMLL's top tecnico (fan favorite) and one of the main Los Invasores members was the longest match of the night, lasting eight minutes longer than the second longest match of the night. Tension was high between the two competitors even before the match as Místico demanded that El Tirantes should not be allowed to referee the match, citing his biased call that cost his team the victory the previous week. After a brief argument El Tirantes was removed from the ring and replaced with a more neutral referee. The match started off swiftly with the two wrestlers working a high paced match. The first fall was evenly split between the two in terms of moves, until Psicosis II used underhanded tactics to gain the advantage. The rudo Psicosis gained the first pin fall when he pinned Místico while grabbing the ropes for extra leverage. During the second fall Psicosis II began tearing at Místico's mask, ripping it open down the left side. Místico evened the score between the two when he rolled Psicosis II up after 05:49 of wrestling in the second fall. The third fall was 7 minutes and 17 seconds of all out action, with the two fighting both inside and outside the ring. The deciding fall came after 20:31 of total wrestling with Místico gaining the victory by submission. Following the match Místico repeated his Lucha de Apuesta, mask vs. mask match, challenge but once again Psicosis II declined, insisting that they needed to have a championship match before he would even think about putting his mask on the line. This was a stall tactic as Místico did not hold an officially recognized championship at the time of the show.

The 2010 Universal Championship tournament started with eight wrestlers, all championship holders, competing for a place in the finals. The competitors were:

- Averno (CMLL World Middleweight Championship)
- Ephesto (CMLL World Light Heavyweight Championship)
- Máscara Dorada (CMLL World Super Lightweight Championship, CMLL World Trios Championship, Mexican National Trios Championship)
- Mephisto (NWA World Middleweight Championship)
- La Sombra (CMLL World Trios Championship)
- Stuka, Jr. (Mexican National Trios Championship)
- El Texano, Jr. (NWA World Light Heavyweight Championship)
- Último Guerrero (CMLL World Heavyweight Championship)

The tournament started with an eight-man Battle Royal to determine the match order for the tournament. The first two men would face off in a singles match, then the third and fourth man eliminated and so forth. Ephesto and El Texano, Jr. were the last two men in the ring, which meant they would wrestle in the fourth first round match of the evening. The first match of the actual tournament saw fellow Mexican National Trios champions Mascara Dorada and Stuka, Jr. face off. The match between the two tecnicos was clean and swift with Mascara Dorada defeating his tag team partner in 3:57 after rolling him up to pin him. The second match saw the leader of Los Guerreros del Infierno, Último Guerrero, face off against the leader of Los Hijos del Averno, Averno in an all-rudo match. Guerrero came to the ring wearing the Universal Championship belt he won in 2009 and proved to be the better man as he defeated Averno in 3:55 to advance. The third match of the opening round was the only rudo/tecnico match up of the opening round with La Sombra fighting against Mephisto. La Sombra had previously won both the CMLL World Tag Team Championship and the NWA World Welterweight Championship from Mephisto and continued the streak as he defeated Mephisto in 3:53. The fourth and final first round match turned out to also be the shortest match of the first round as Los Hijos del Averno teammates El Texano, Jr. and Ephesto fought. El Texano, Jr. was a finalist in the 2009 tournament and advanced to the quarterfinals when he pinned Ephesto.

In the second round reigning Universal champion Último Guerrero defeated triple champion Mascara Dorada after applying his trademark "Guerrero Special" (Inverted superplex) move and pinning him in 4:24. In the other quarter final La Sombra made short work of El Texano, Jr. rolling him up for the pinfall at just 2:28, the shortest match of the entire tournament. The final match lasted almost nine minutes and saw Último Guerrero almost win the match on several occasions, including a very close call after applying the "Guerrero Special". La Sombra overcame the effects of the move and won with a Toque Universal to pin Guerrero at 8:51 to earn a place in the final on August 13, 2010.

In the third match of the night La Peste Negra members El Felino and Negro Casas teamed up with Rey Bucanero, replacing their regular partner Mr. Niebla. Bucanero was accompanied to the ring by a dwarf wearing a parrot suit which seemed to be his new "mascot" to go along with his Pirate character. The team took on the Los Invasores team of Charly Manson and the CMLL World Tag Team Champions Héctor Garza and Mr. Águila as a part of the ongoing "CMLL vs Los Invasores" storyline that has been running since April, 2010. Manson made his Super Viernes debut and took the first fall when he forced Rey Bucanero to submit to his El Pozo (Reverse figure four leglock) submission hold. In the second fall Negro Casas forced Mr. Águila to submit to a leglock while El Felino took out Charly Manson with a Moonsault and subsequent pin fall. The final fall lasted longer than the first two falls combined and saw copious amounts of cheating from all six competitors. In the end Garza pinned Rey Bucanero to earn a two to one victory for Los Invasores.

The second match of the night saw the continuation of the feud between Los Ángeles Celestiales (Ángel Azteca, Jr., Ángel de Oro and Ángel de Plata) and Los Guerreros Tuareg, represented by Arkangel de la Muerte Loco Max and Skándalo on the night. The feud mainly focused on Ángel Azteca, Jr. and Arkangel de la Muerte and played off the fact that Arkangel de la Muerte was the man to unmask Ángel Azteca many years ago. Los Ángeles won the match in two straight falls, taking the second fall by disqualification after the referee noticed Skándalo administer a low blow to Ángel de Oro. In the opening match the makeshift rudo team of Camorra and Súper Comando used underhanded tactics to defeat Leono and the grandson of Ángel Blanco, Horus in just over 12 minutes of wrestling.

| No. | Results | Stipulations | Times |
|---|---|---|---|
| 1 | Camorra and Súper Comando defeated Horus and Leono | Best two out of three falls Tag team match | 12:15 |
| 2 | Los Ángeles Celestiales (Ángel Azteca, Jr., Ángel de Oro and Ángel de Plata) defeated Los Guerreros Tuareg (Arkangel de la Muerte Loco Max and Skándalo) | Six-man tag team match | 12:21 |
| 3 | Los Invasores (Charly Manson Héctor Garza and Mr. Águila) defeated La Peste Negra (El Felino and Negro Casas) and Rey Bucanero | Six-man tag team match | 10:49 |
| 4 | Ephesto and El Texano, Jr. defeated Último Guerrero, Averno, Mephisto, Máscara Dorada, Stuka Jr. and La Sombra | 2010 Universal Championship Block A seeding Battle Royal | — |
| 5 | Mascara Dorada defeated Stuka Jr. | CMLL Universal Championship round one match | 03:57 |
| 6 | Último Guerrero defeated Averno | CMLL Universal Championship round one match | 03:55 |
| 7 | La Sombra defeated Mephisto | CMLL Universal Championship round one match | 03:53 |
| 8 | El Texano Jr. defeated Ephesto | CMLL Universal Championship round one match | 02:45 |
| 9 | Último Guerrero defeated Mascara Dorada | CMLL Universal Championship quarterfinal match | 04:24 |
| 10 | La Sombra defeated El Texano Jr. | CMLL Universal Championship quarterfinal match | 02:28 |
| 11 | La Sombra defeated Último Guerrero | CMLL Universal Championship semifinal match | 08:51 |
| 12 | Místico defeated Psicosis | Best two-out-of-three falls match | 20:31 |
